= Welcome sign =

Road sign at a border

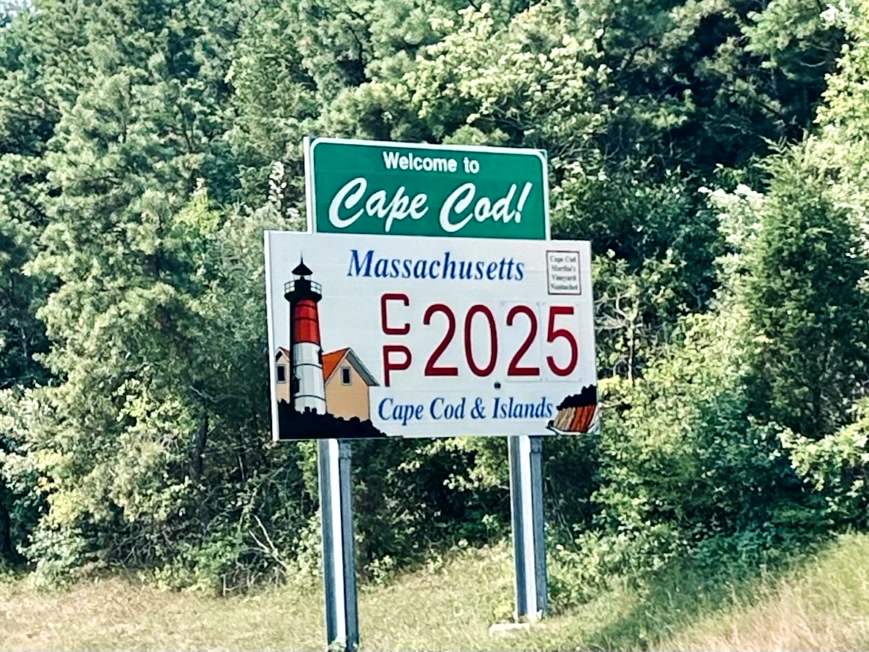
Welcome sign for Cape Cod, Massachusetts

A welcome sign (or gateway sign) is a road sign at the border of a jurisdiction or region that introduces or welcomes visitors to the place. Examples of welcome signs can be found near political borders, such as when entering a state, province, county, city, or town, and they are increasingly found in neighborhoods and private communities. In European countries under the Schengen Agreement, a welcome sign may be found at borders between countries. Its purpose is partly informational, to inform drivers where they are, and partly for tourism, as it affords an opportunity to advertise features within the region to people who are entering it. A welcome sign is a type of town sign—a sign placed at the entrance to and exit from a city, town, or village. In many jurisdictions, the format of town signs is standardized; in some, welcome signs may be distinct from the legally mandated town sign.

A municipality's welcome sign may give its population or date of foundation, list twinned towns or services within the town, or depict the town's crest, typical local products, or the logo of sponsor organizations which maintain the sign (such as the local Lions Club).

== Gallery ==
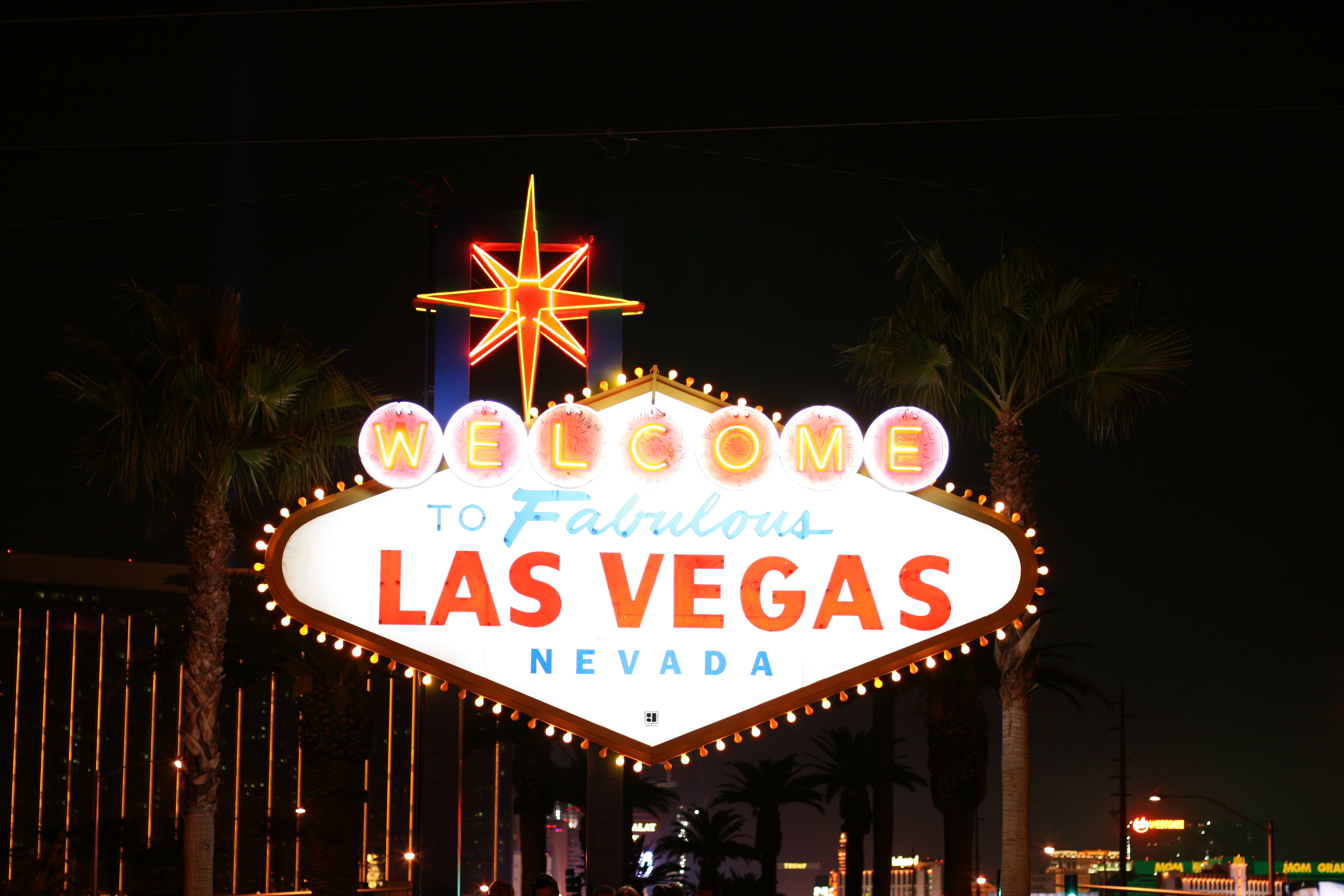
Welcome to Fabulous Las Vegas sign, Las Vegas, Nevada

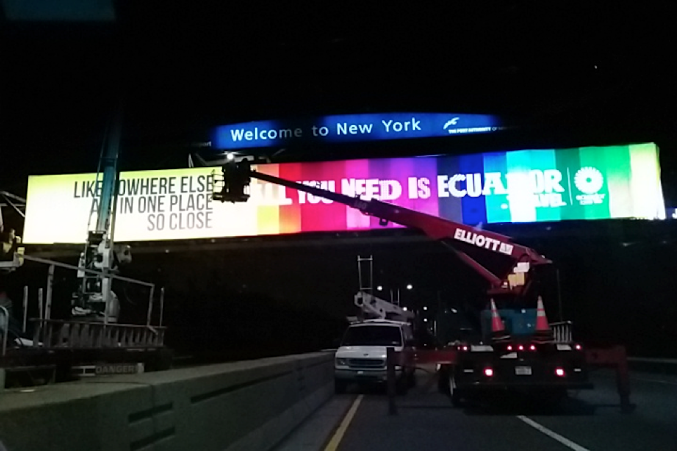
Welcome to New York City, New York

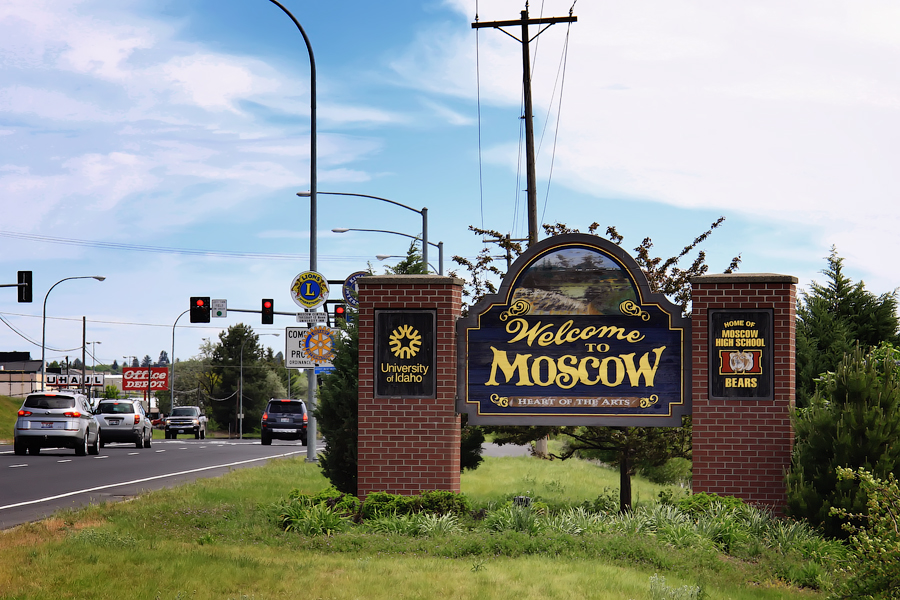
Welcome sign in Moscow, Idaho

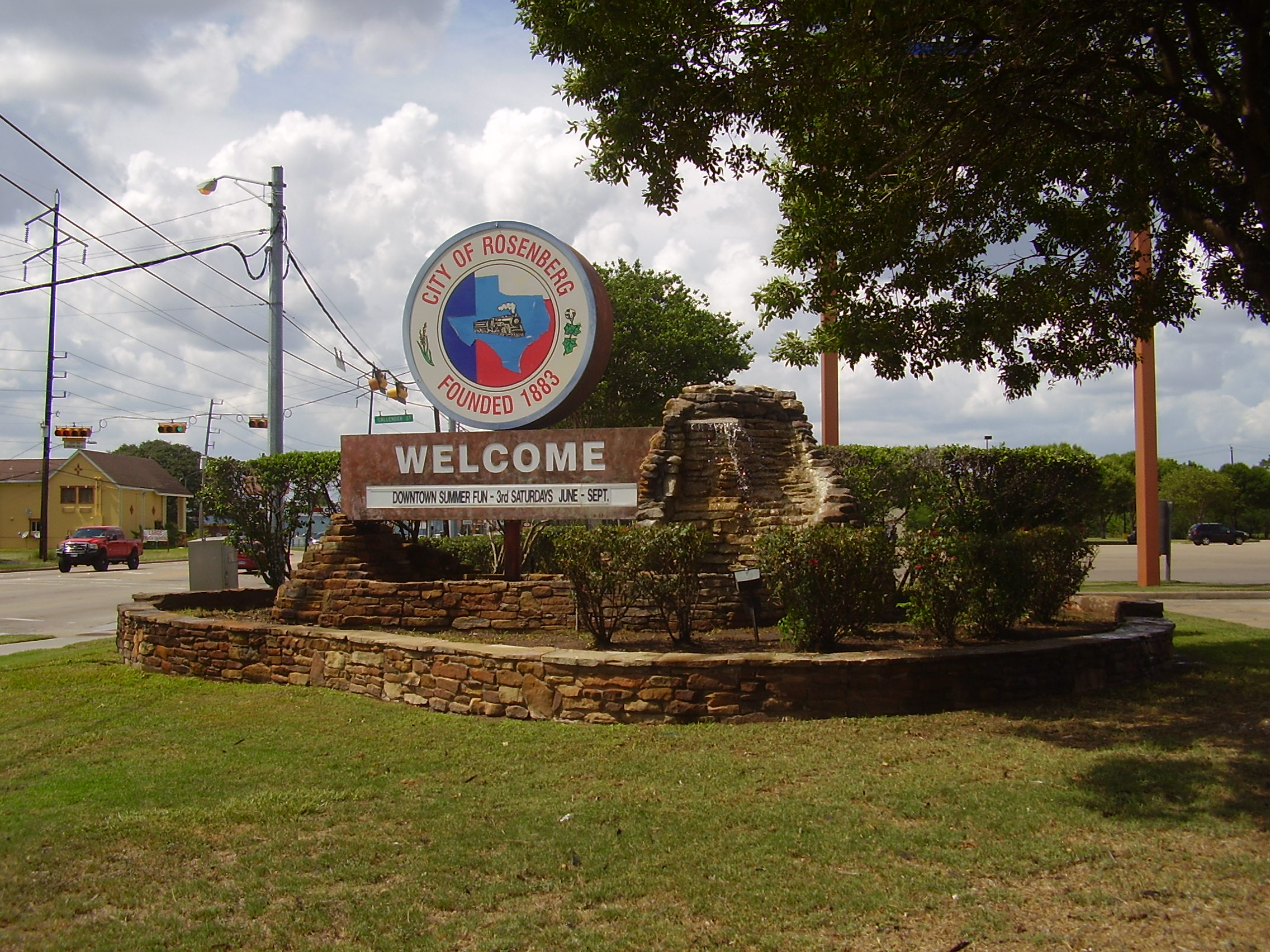
Welcome sign in Rosenberg, Texas

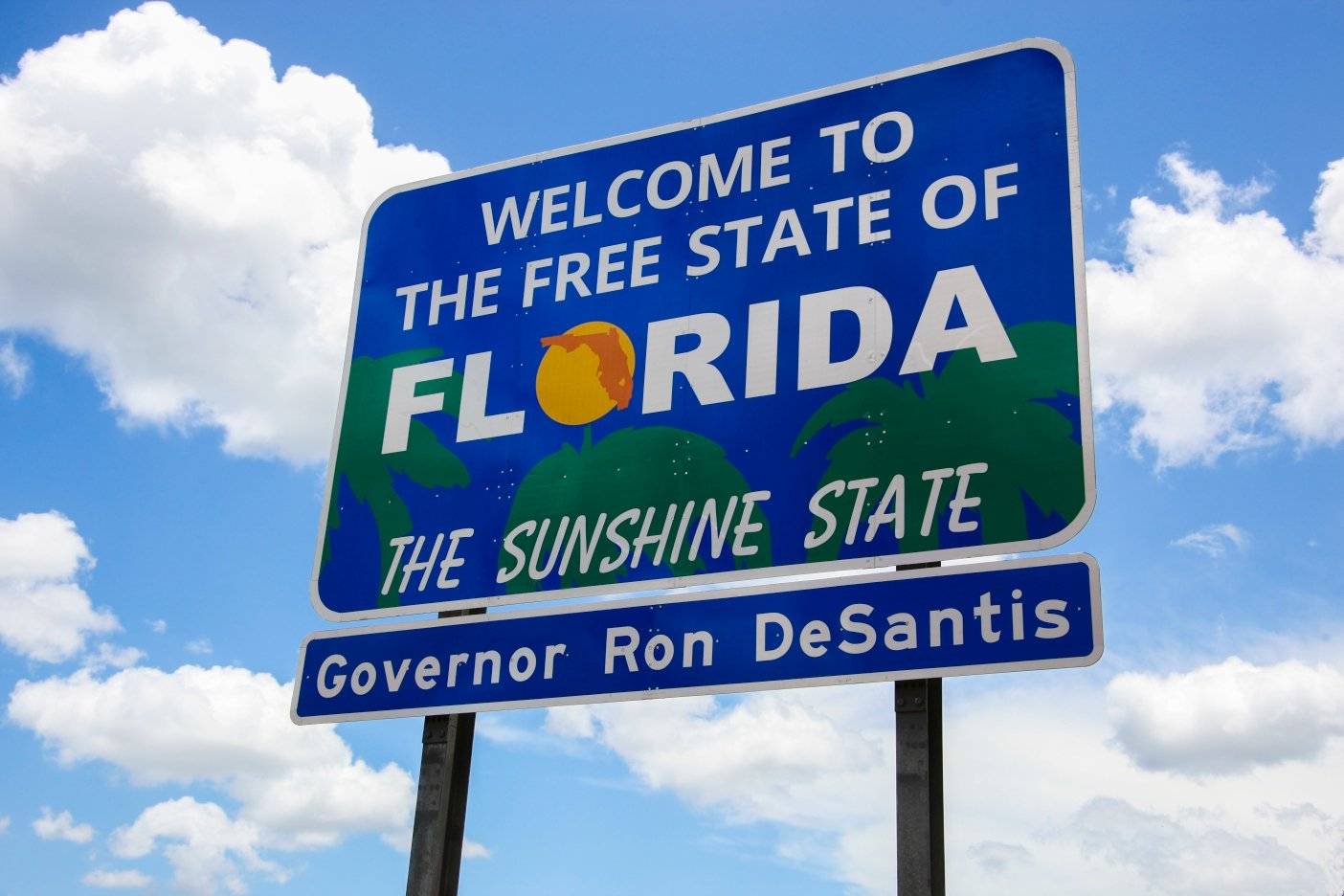
Welcome sign in Florida

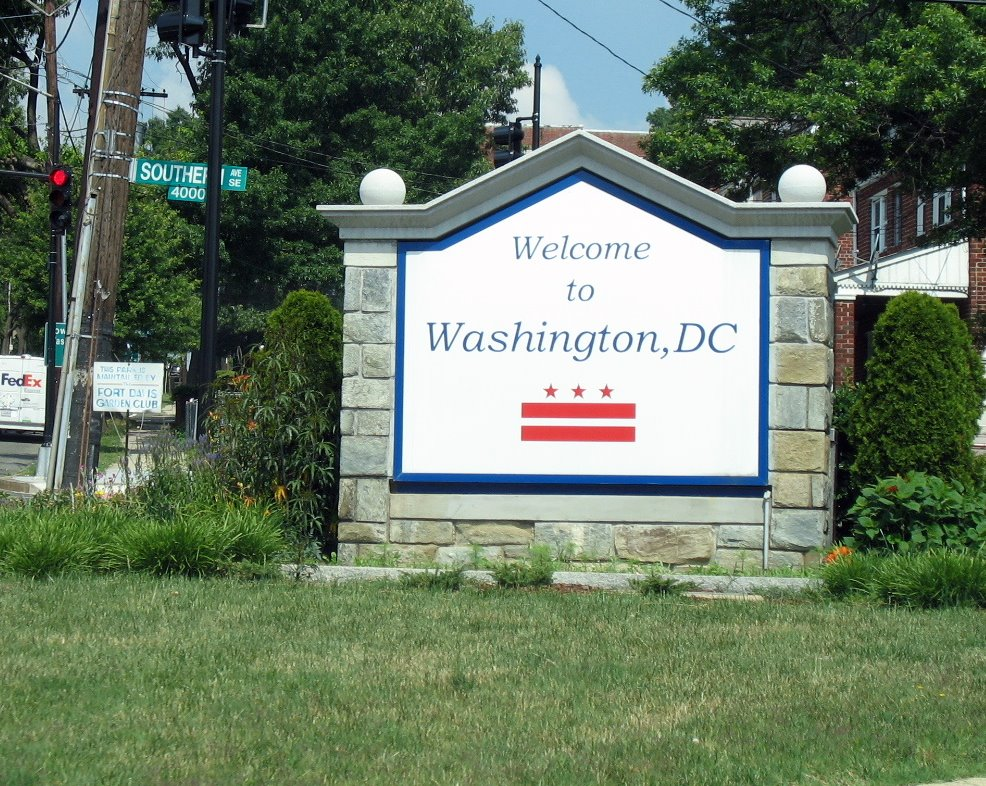
Washington, D.C.

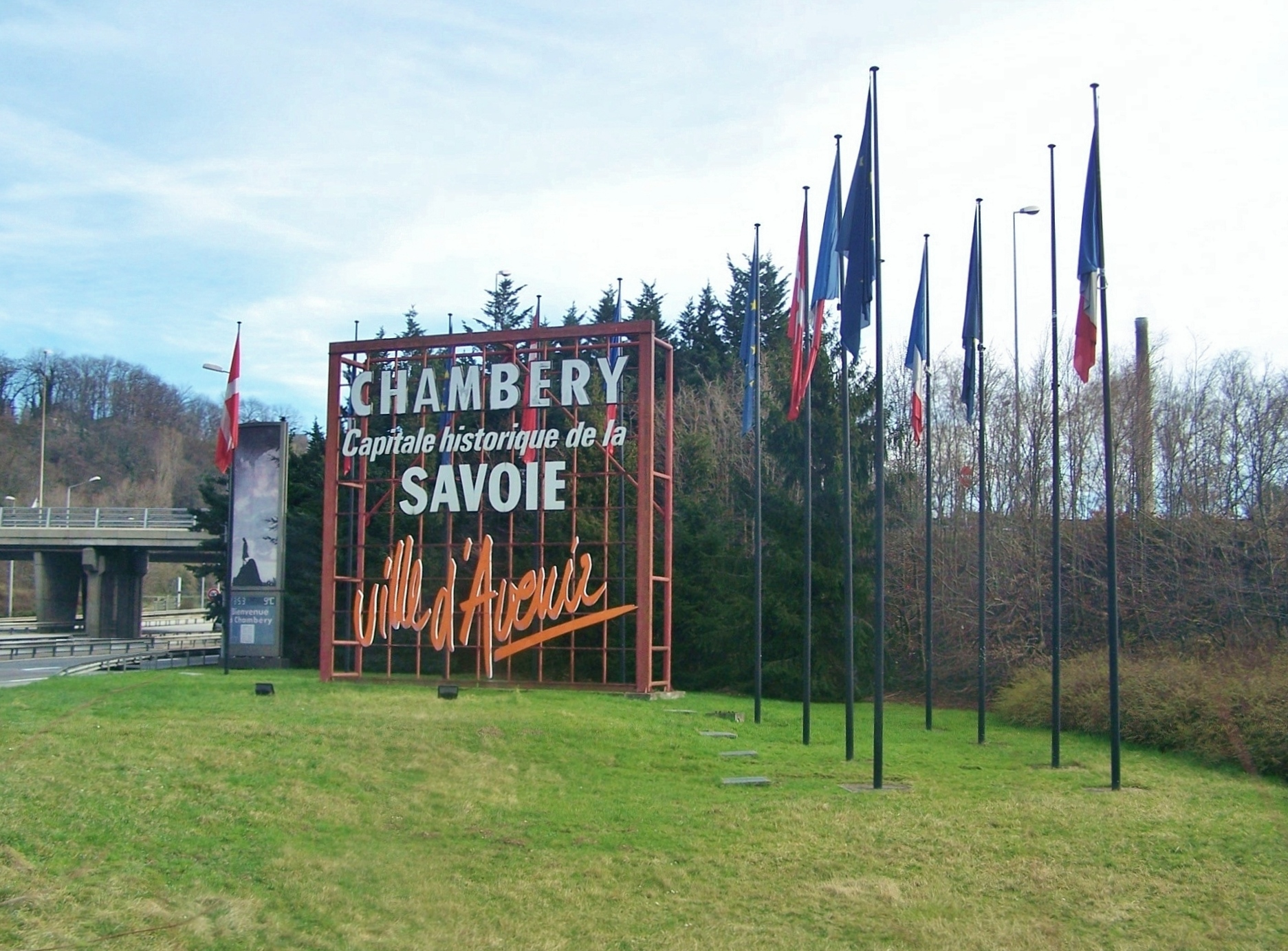
Chambéry, France

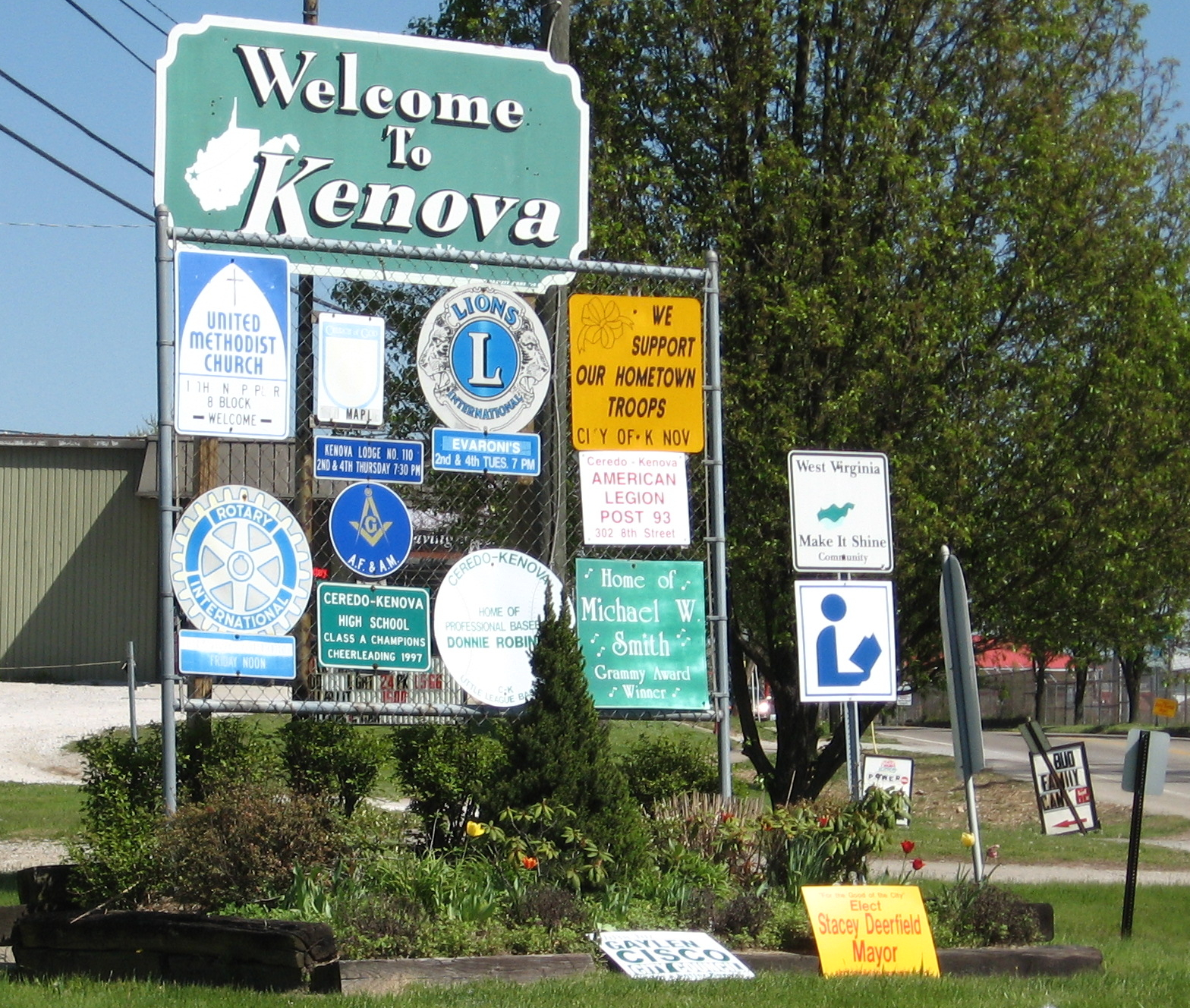
Kenova, West Virginia

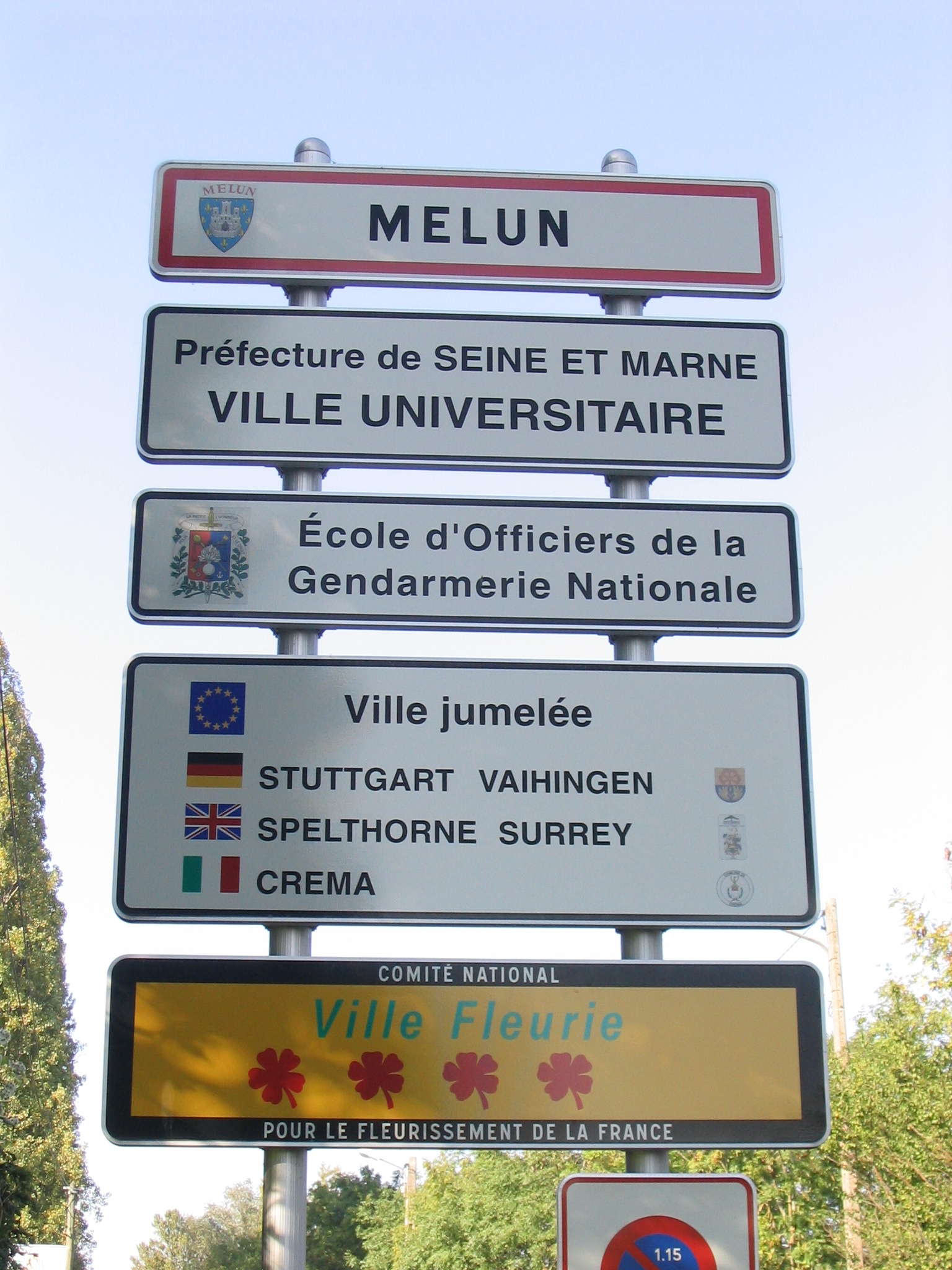
Melun, France

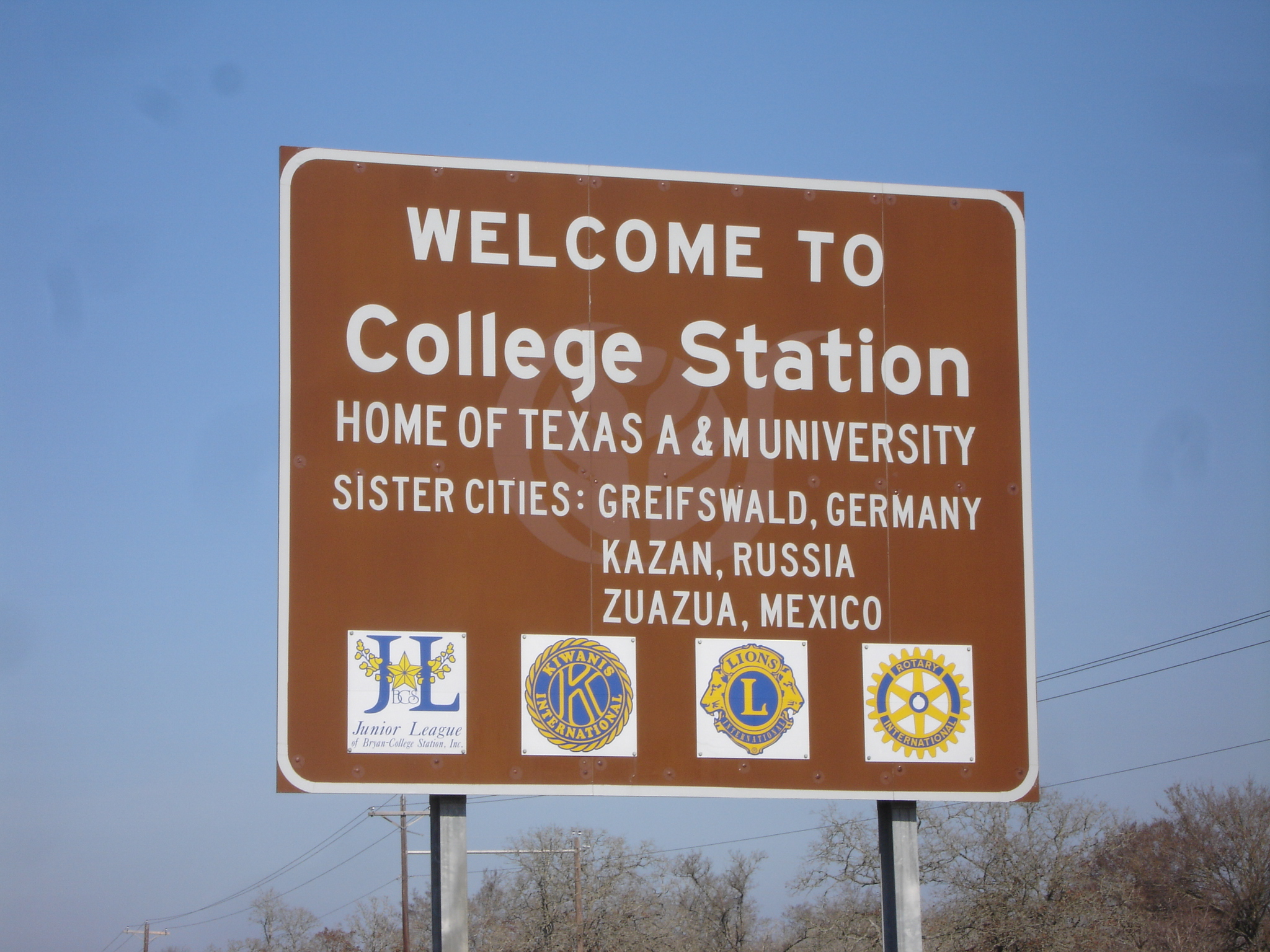
College Station, Texas

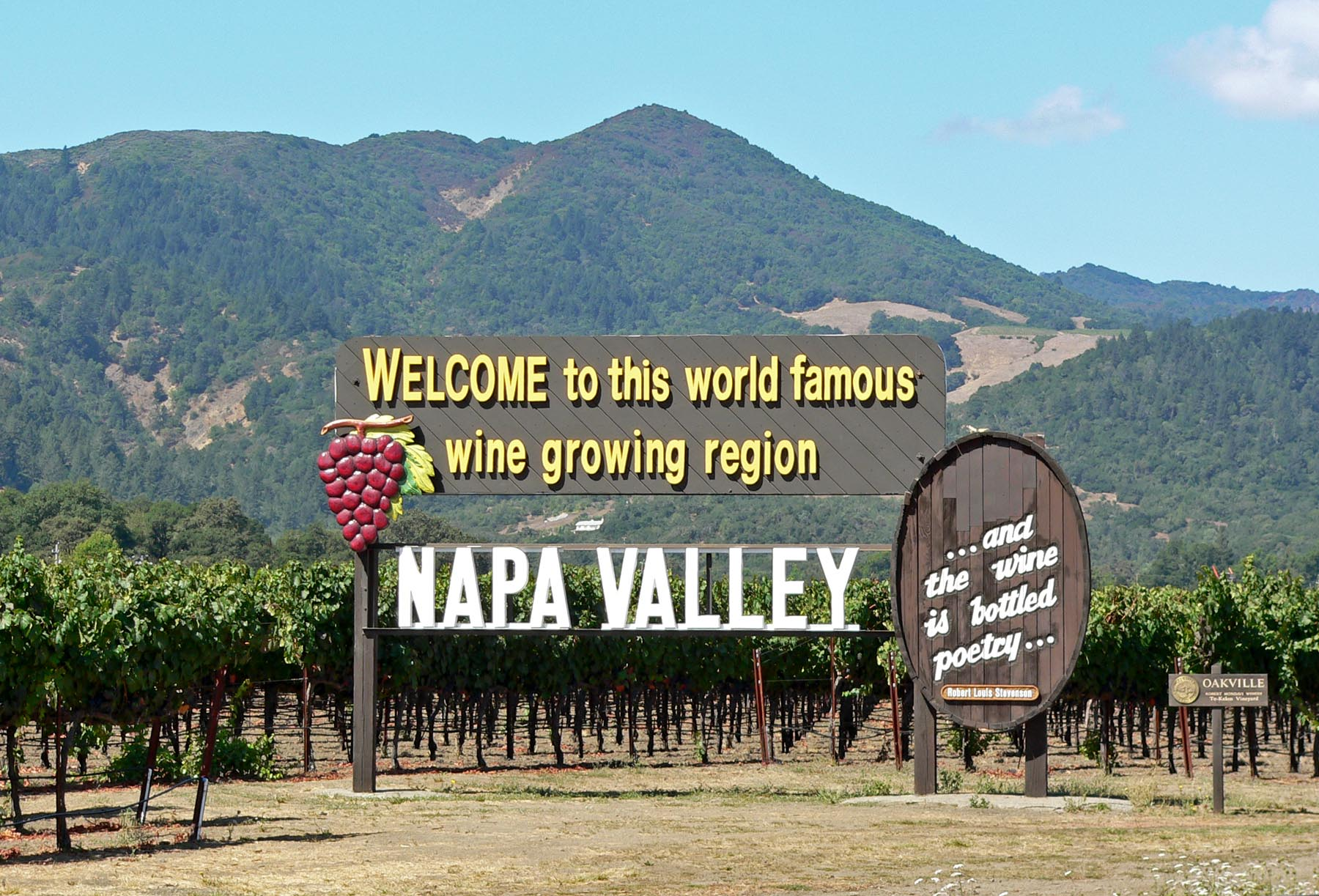
Napa Valley, California

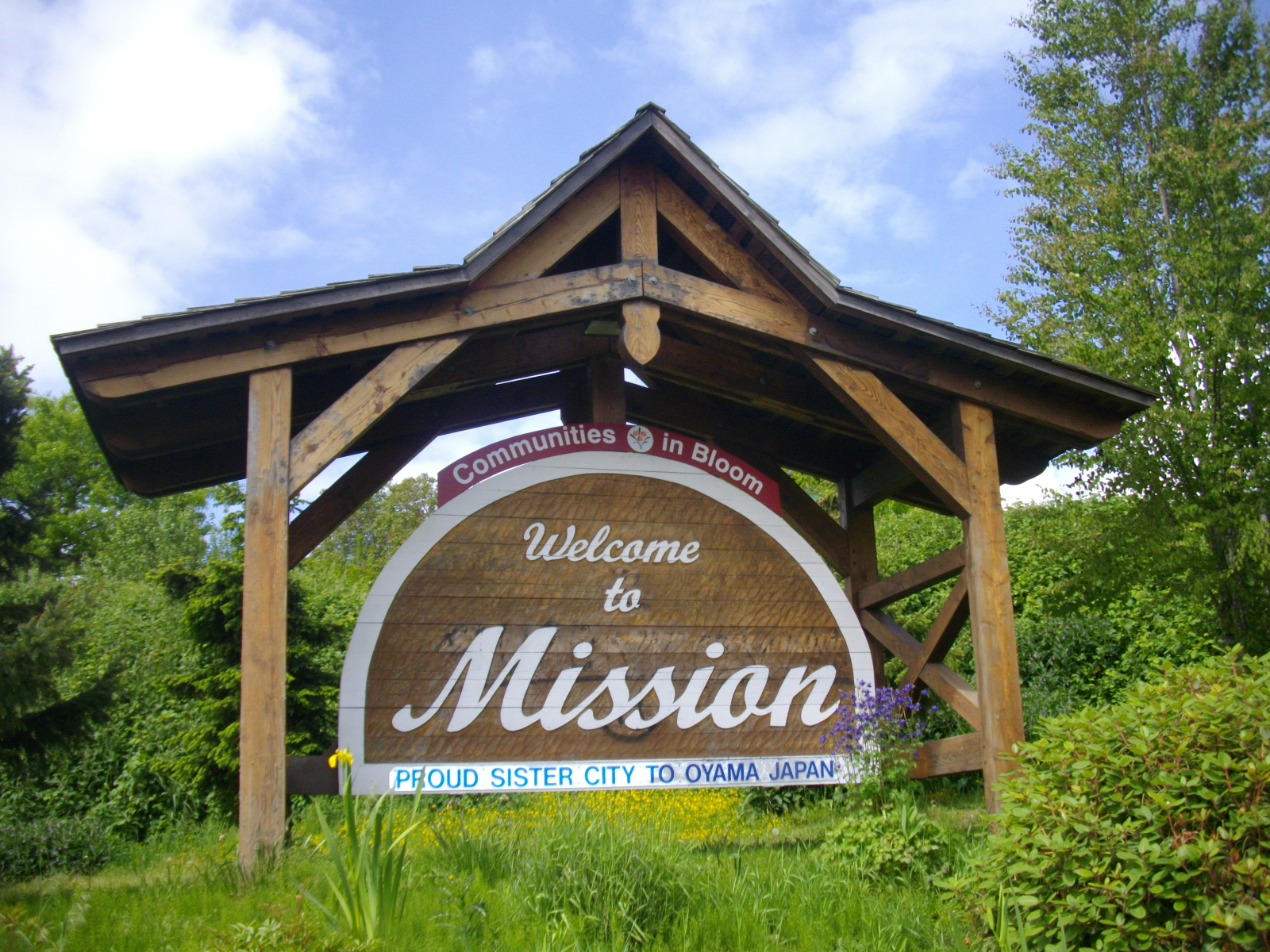
Mission, Canada

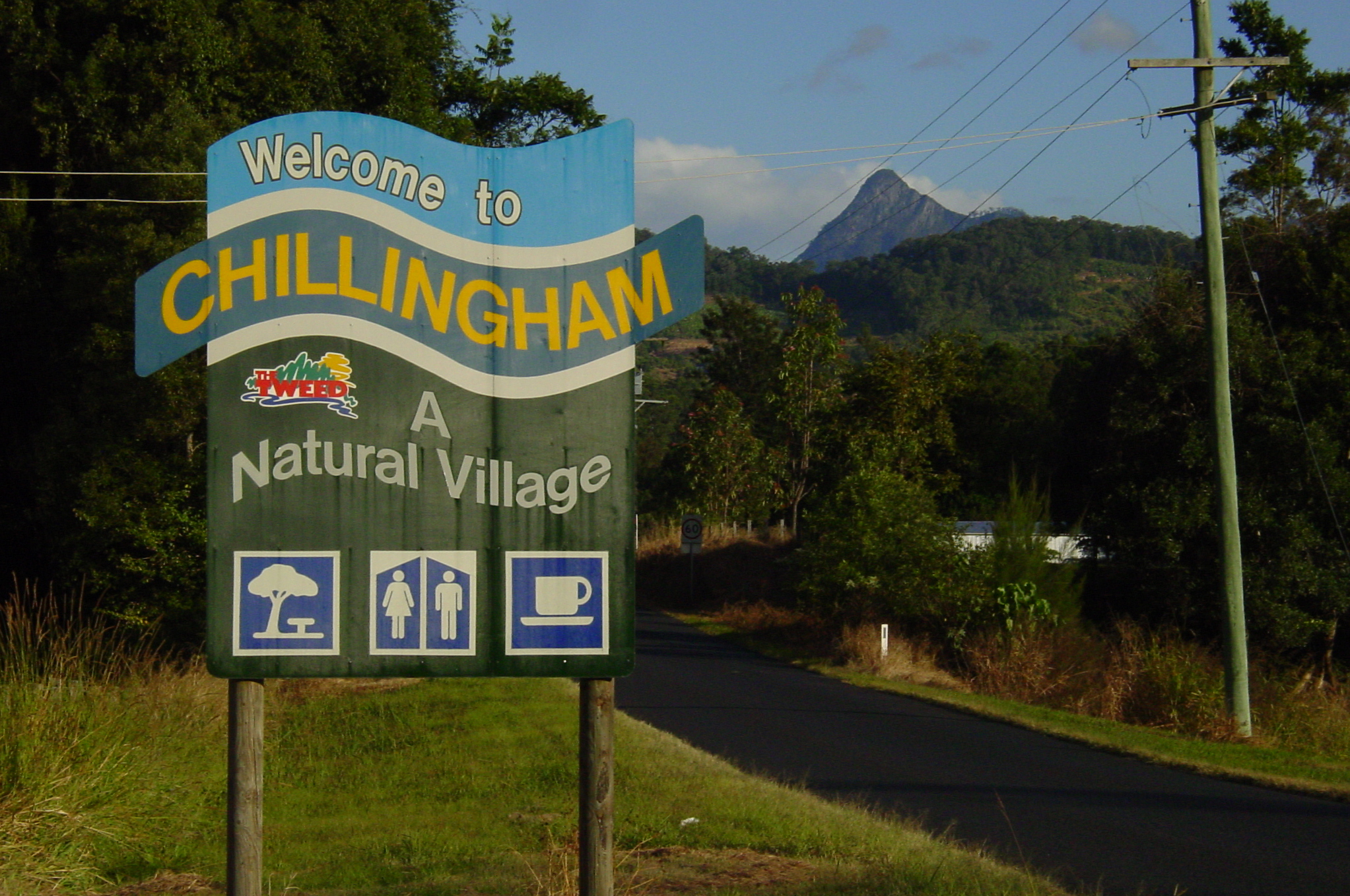
Chillingham, Australia

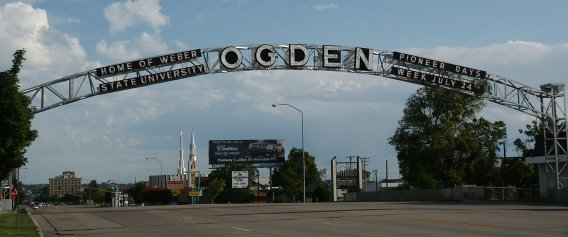
Ogden, Utah

Maryland welcome sign, c. 1980s

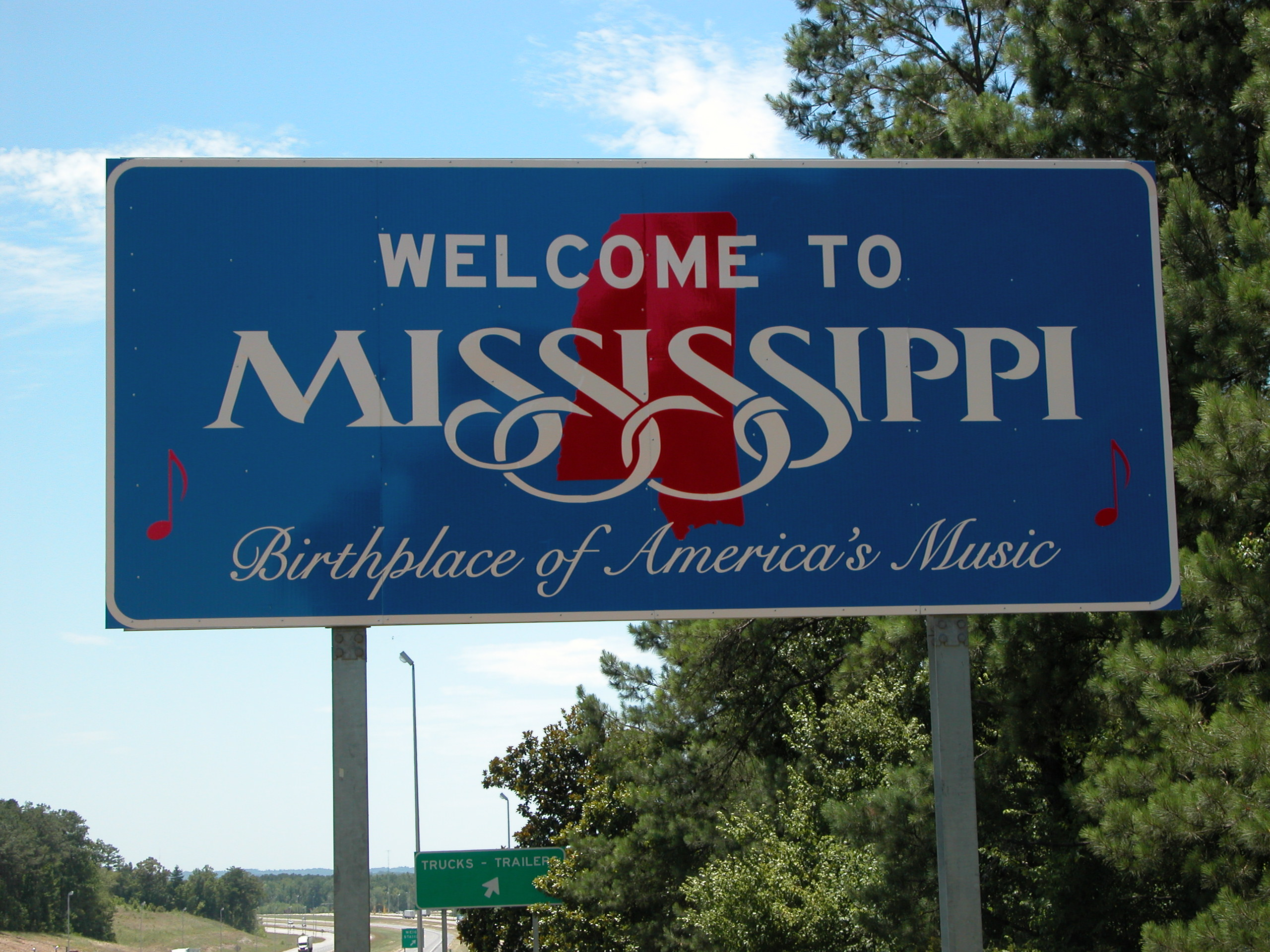
The Mississippi welcome sign

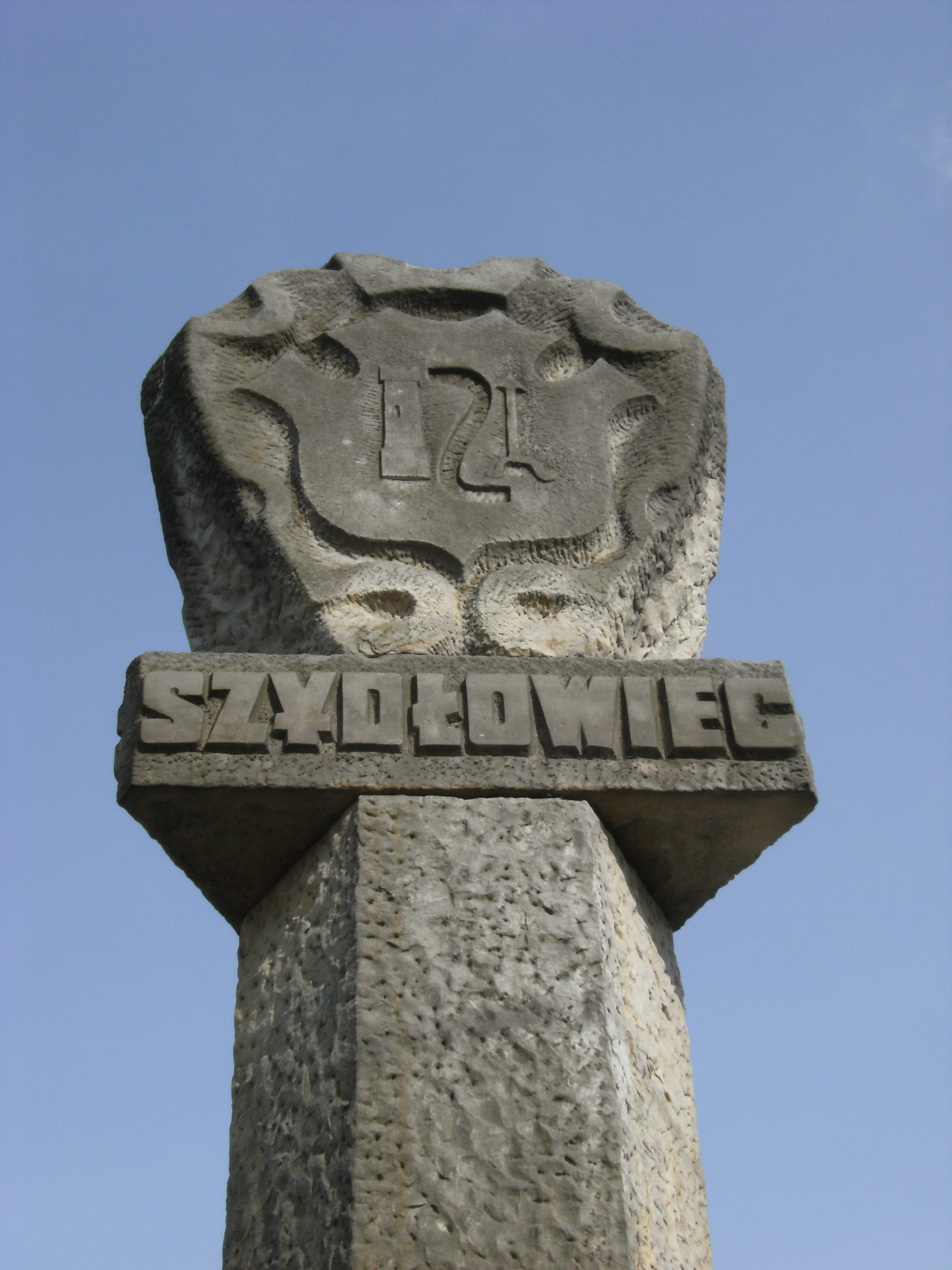
Szydłowiec, Poland

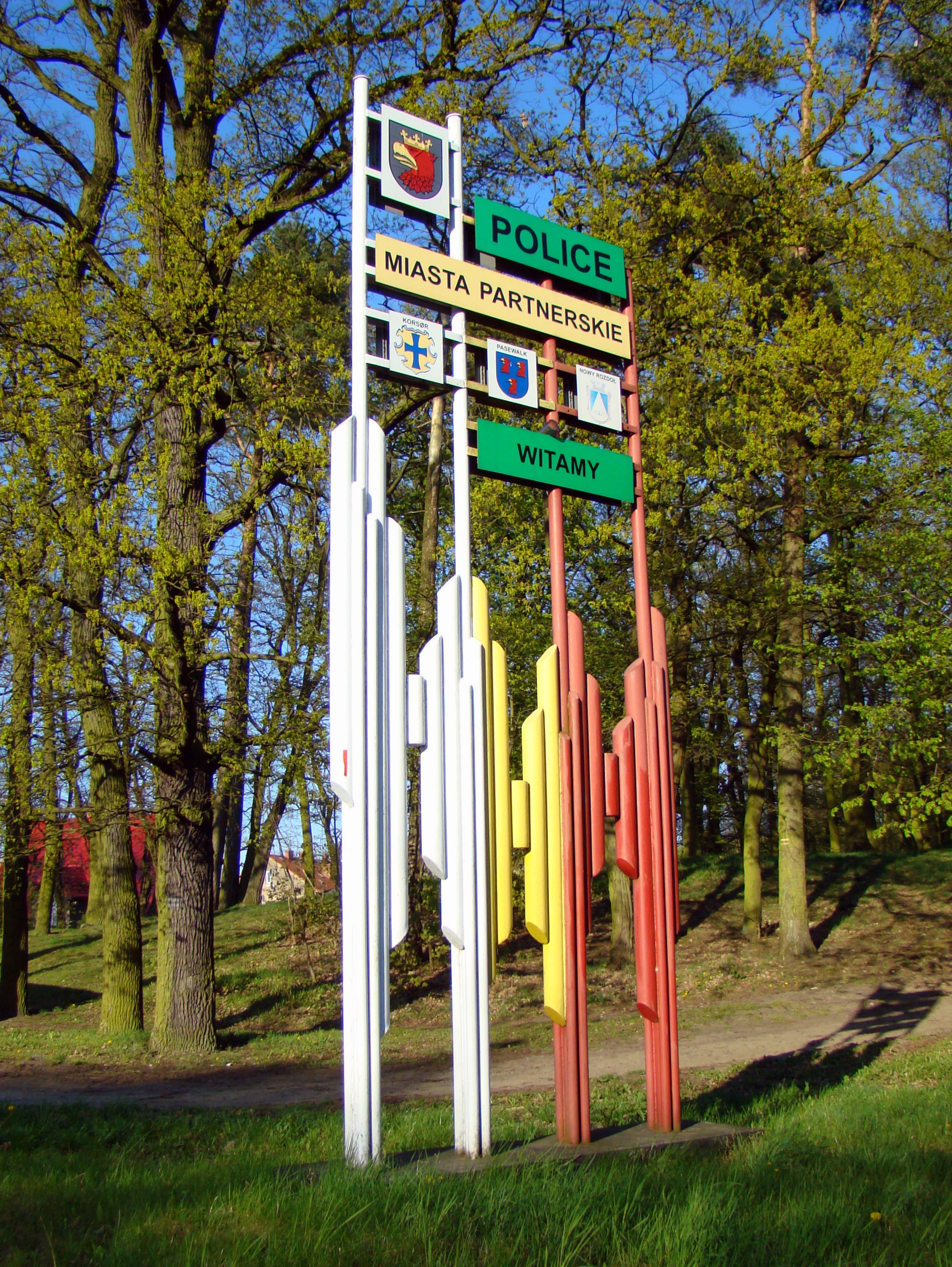
Police, Poland

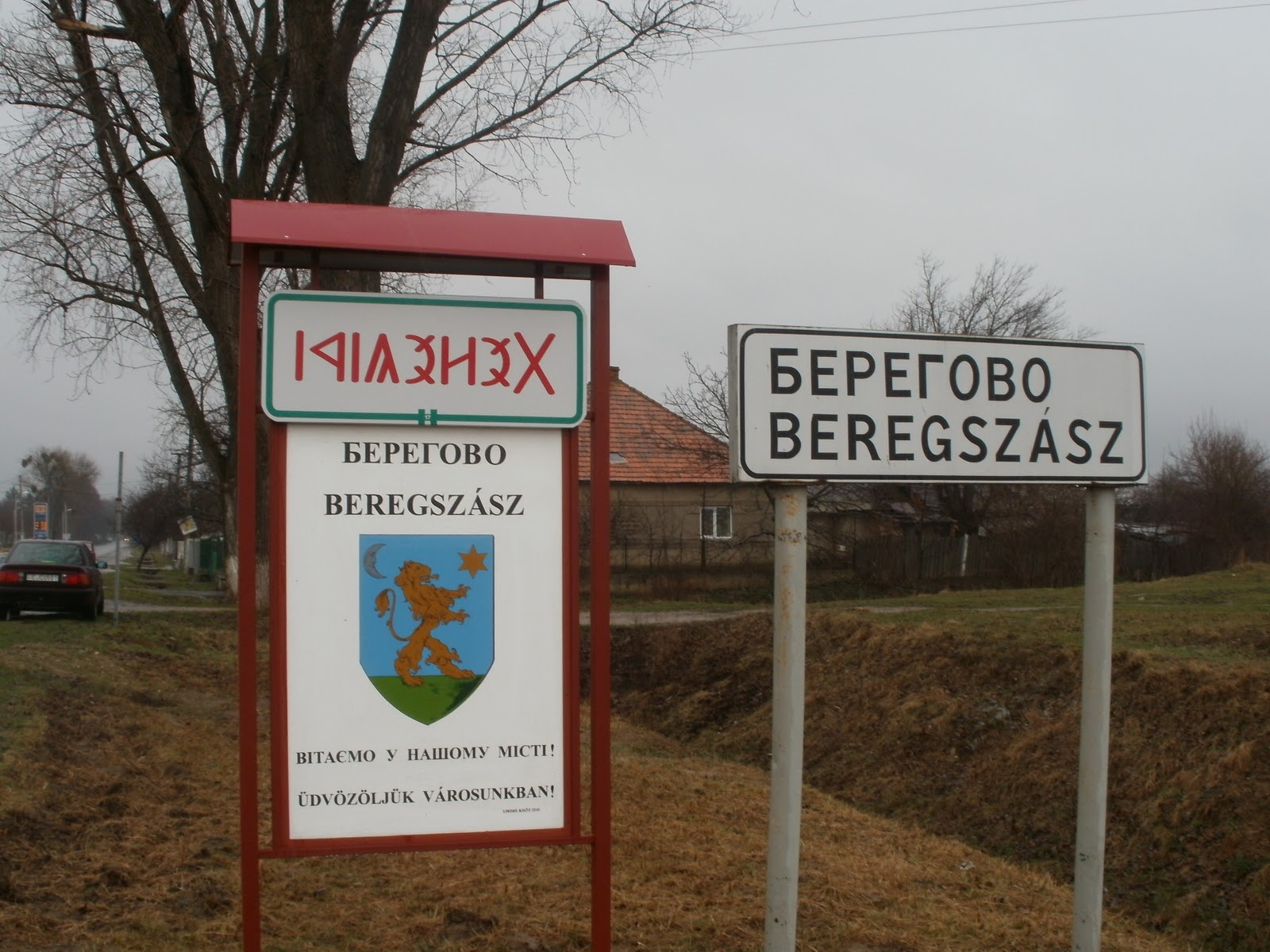
Bilingual entry signs in Beregszász / Berehove / Берегово (Ukraine) - with Cyrillic letters (for Ukrainian), Latin and rovas letters (for Hungarian).

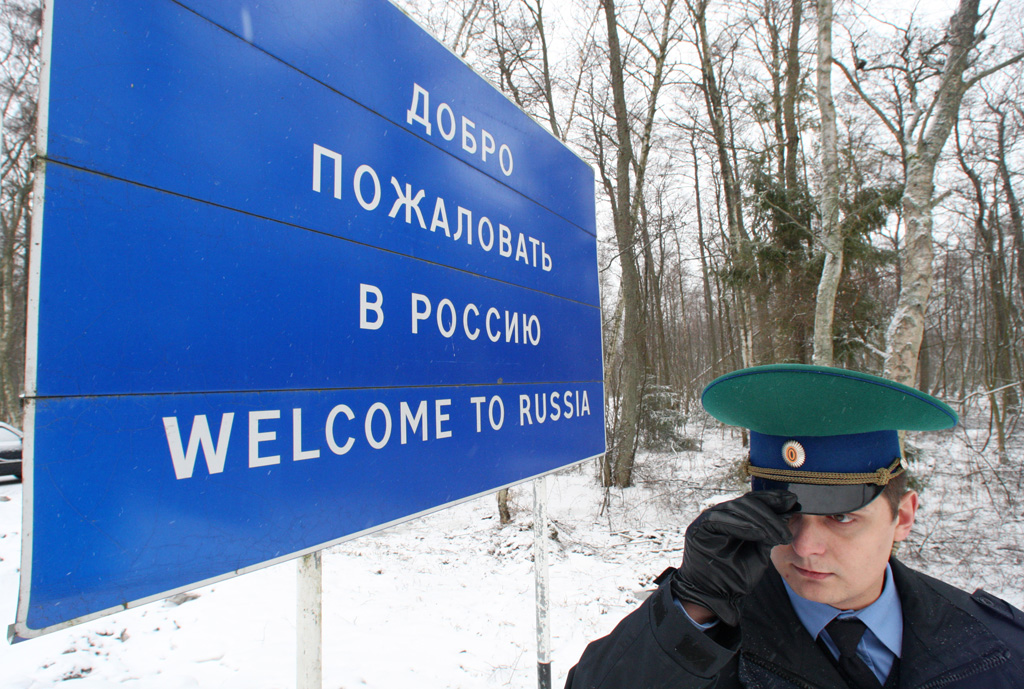
Bilingual welcome sign in Russian and English near the Lithuania–Russia border in Rybachy, Kaliningrad Oblast, Russia

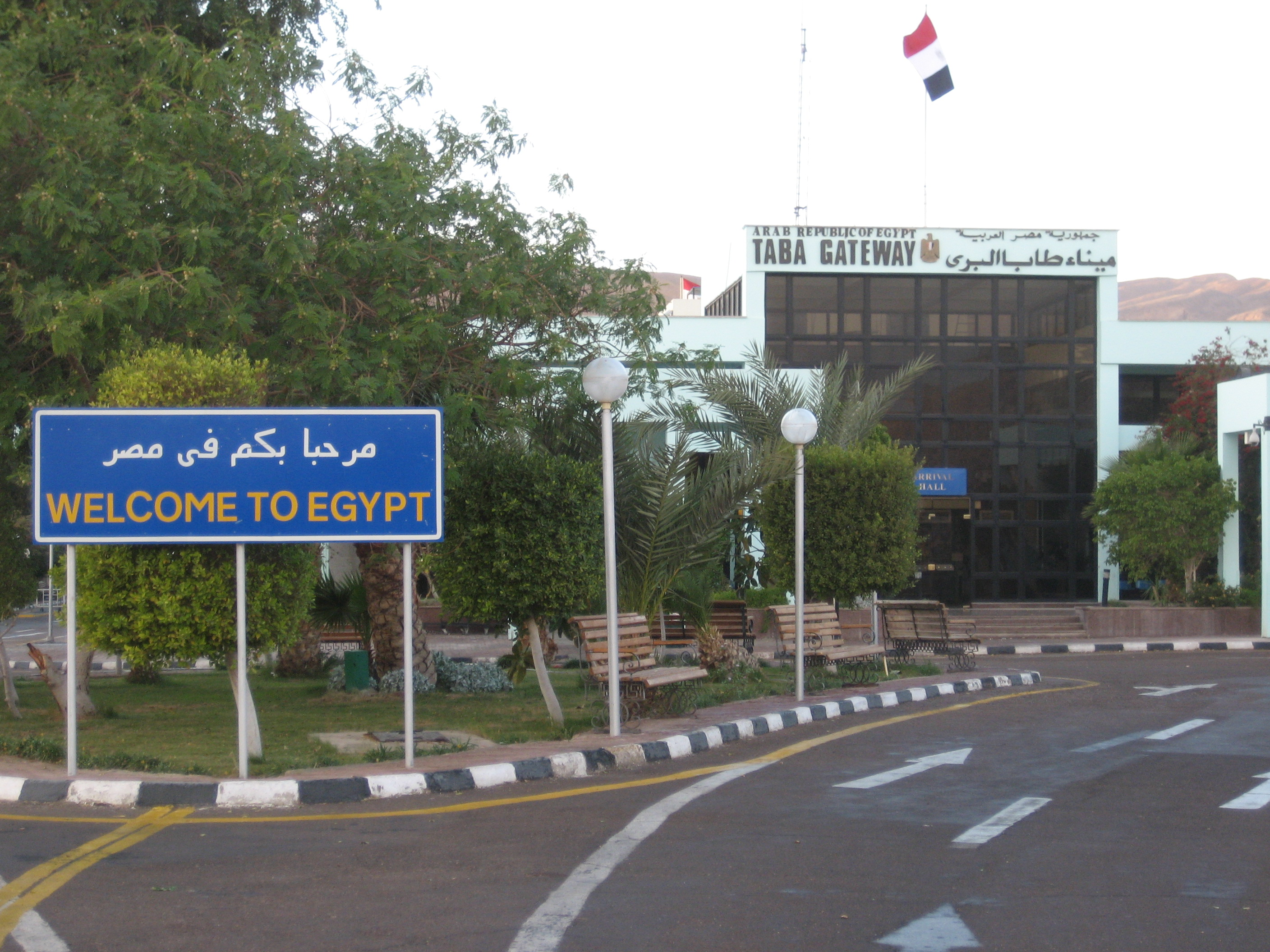
Bilingual welcome sign in Arabic and English on Egyptian-Israeli Taba Border Crossing, Egypt

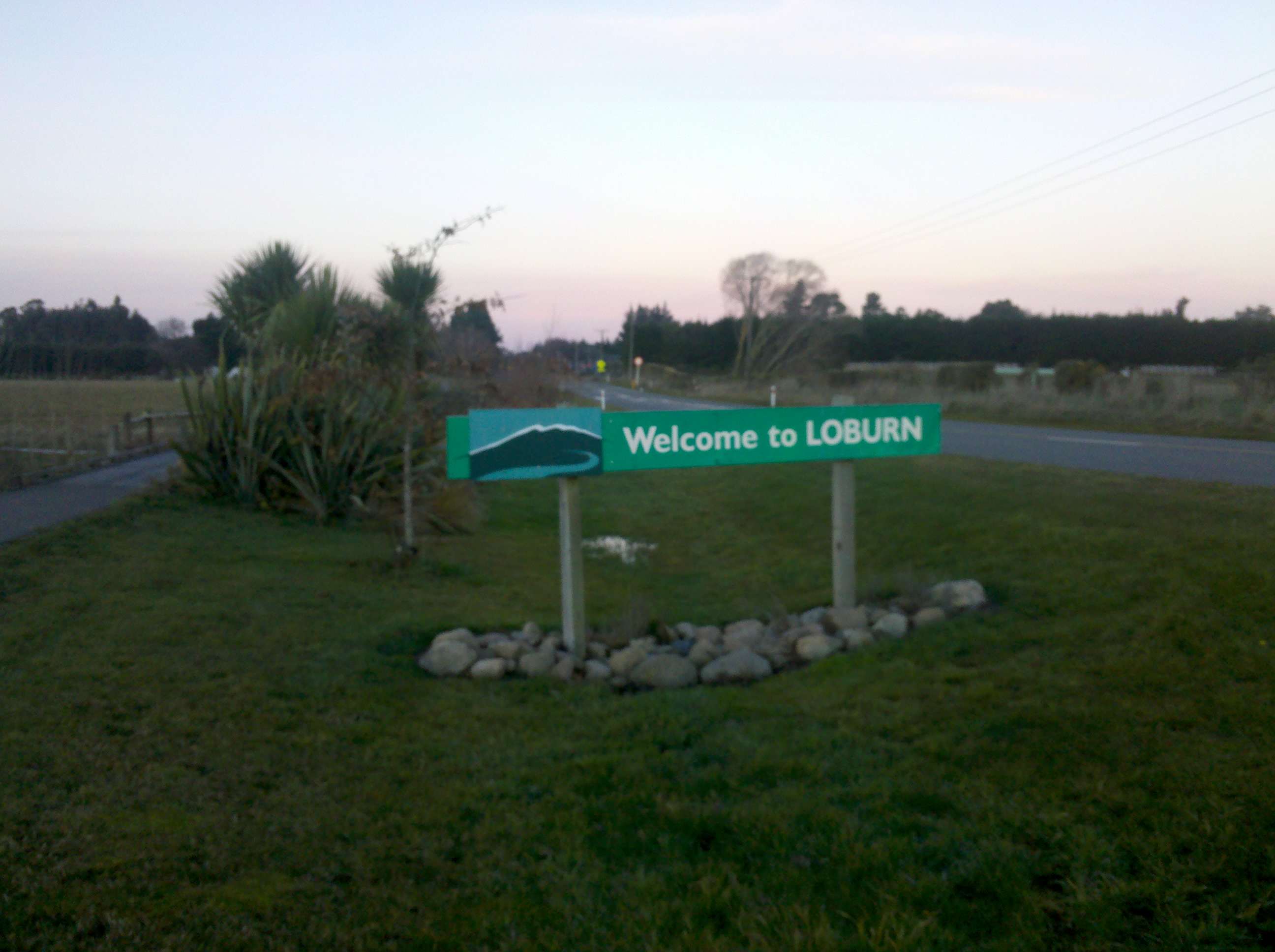
Welcome sign in Loburn, New Zealand.

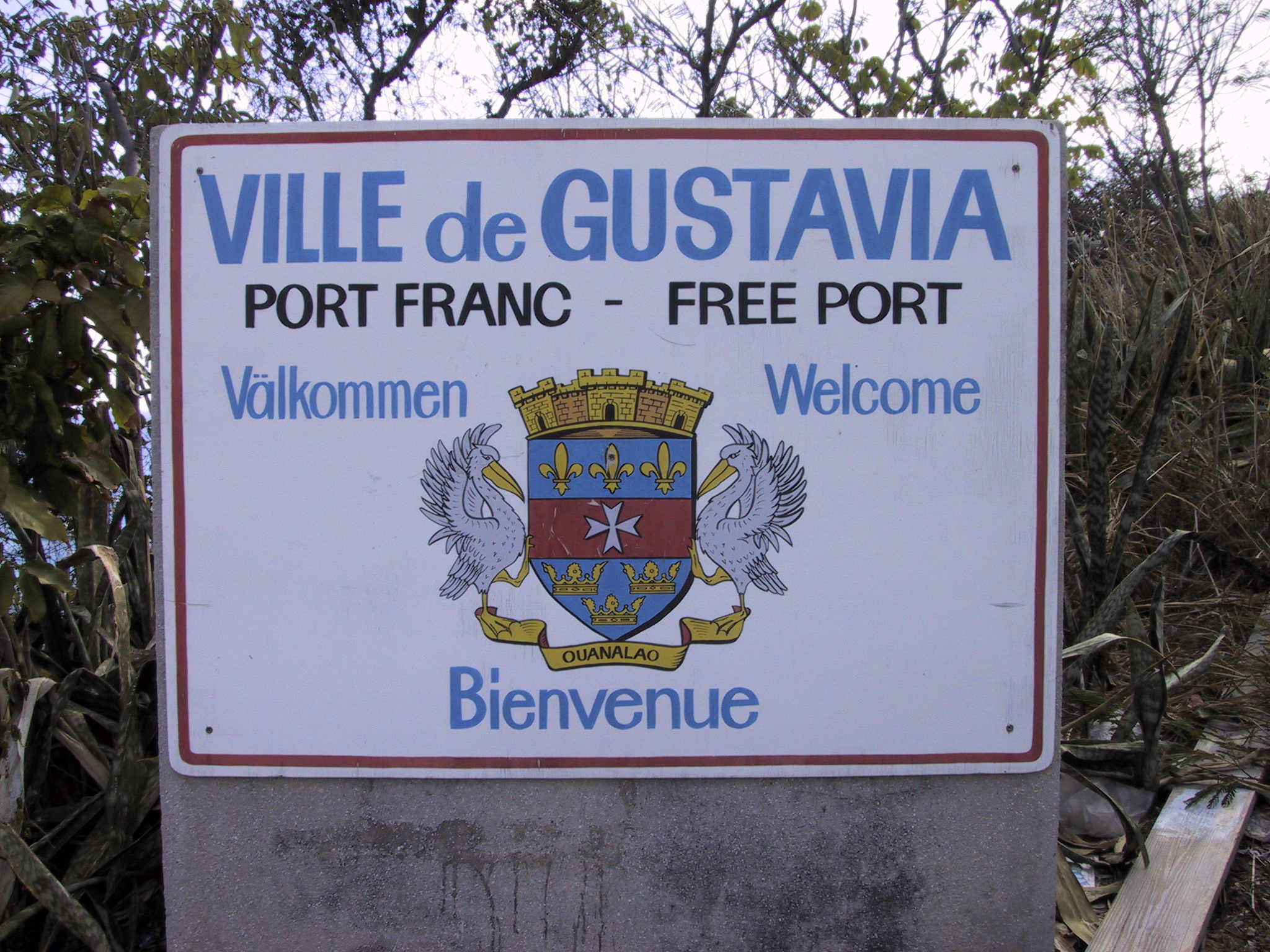
Swedish, French and English welcome sign in Gustavia, France.

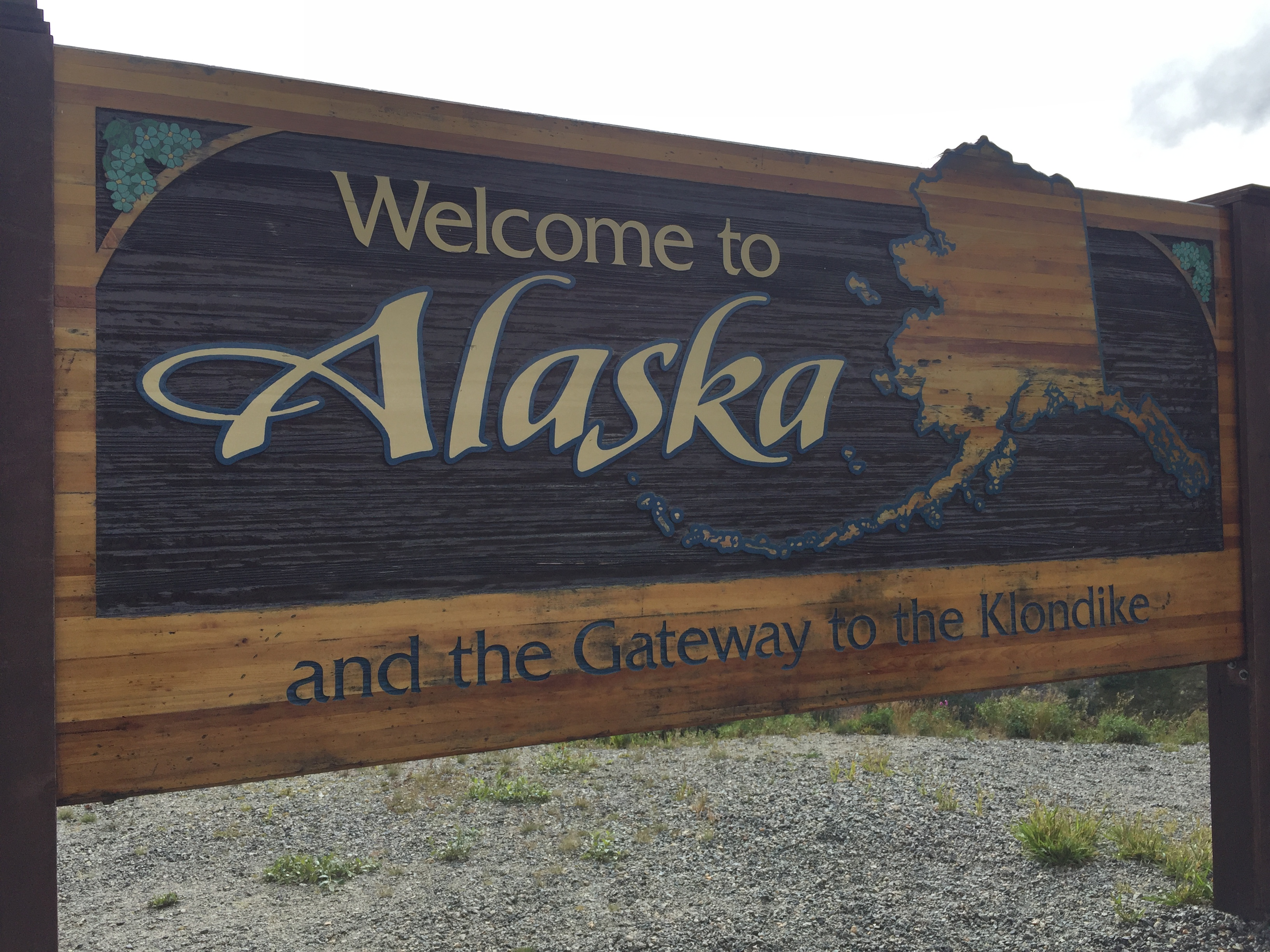
Alaska welcome sign

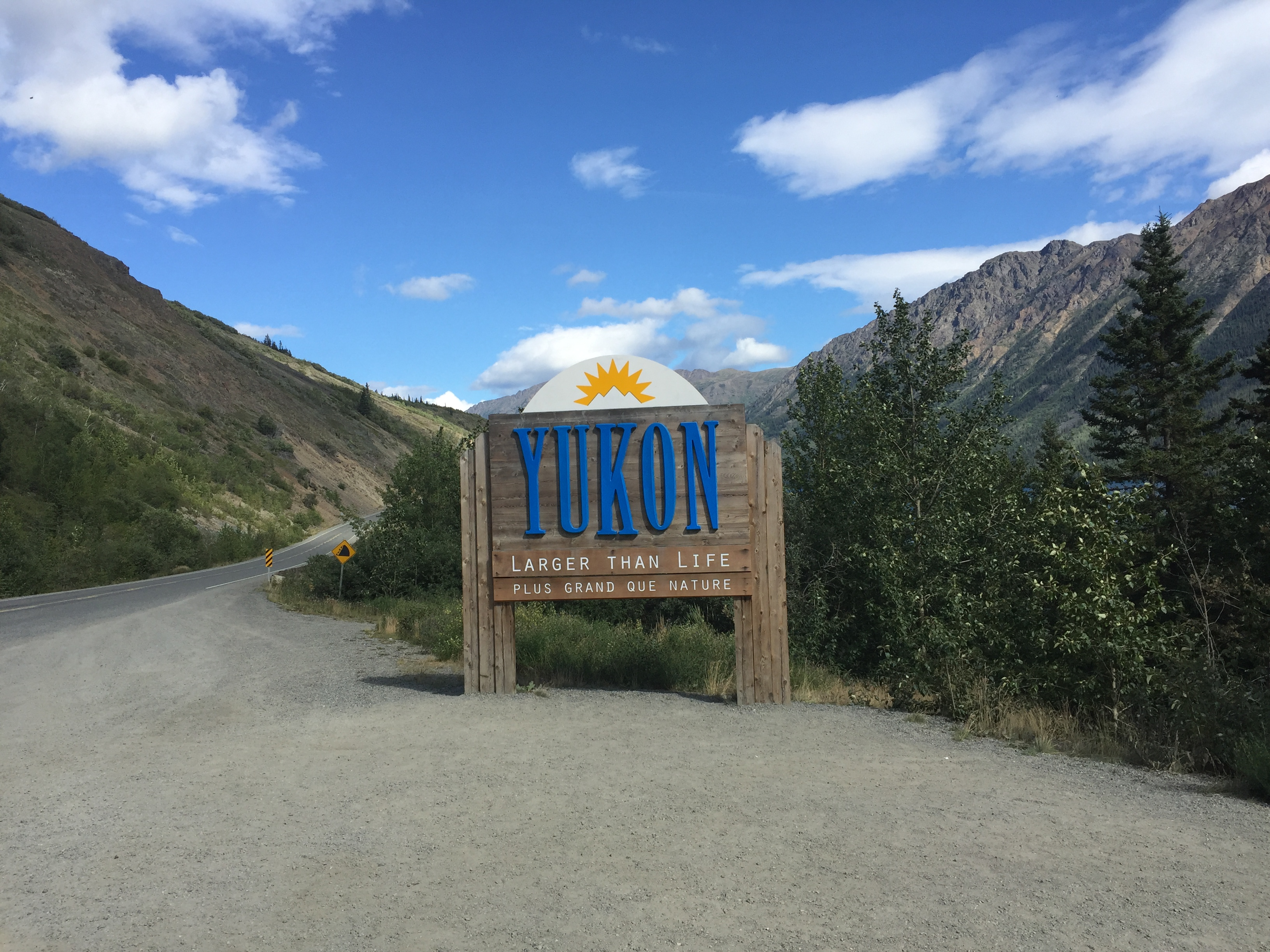
Yukon larger than life sign

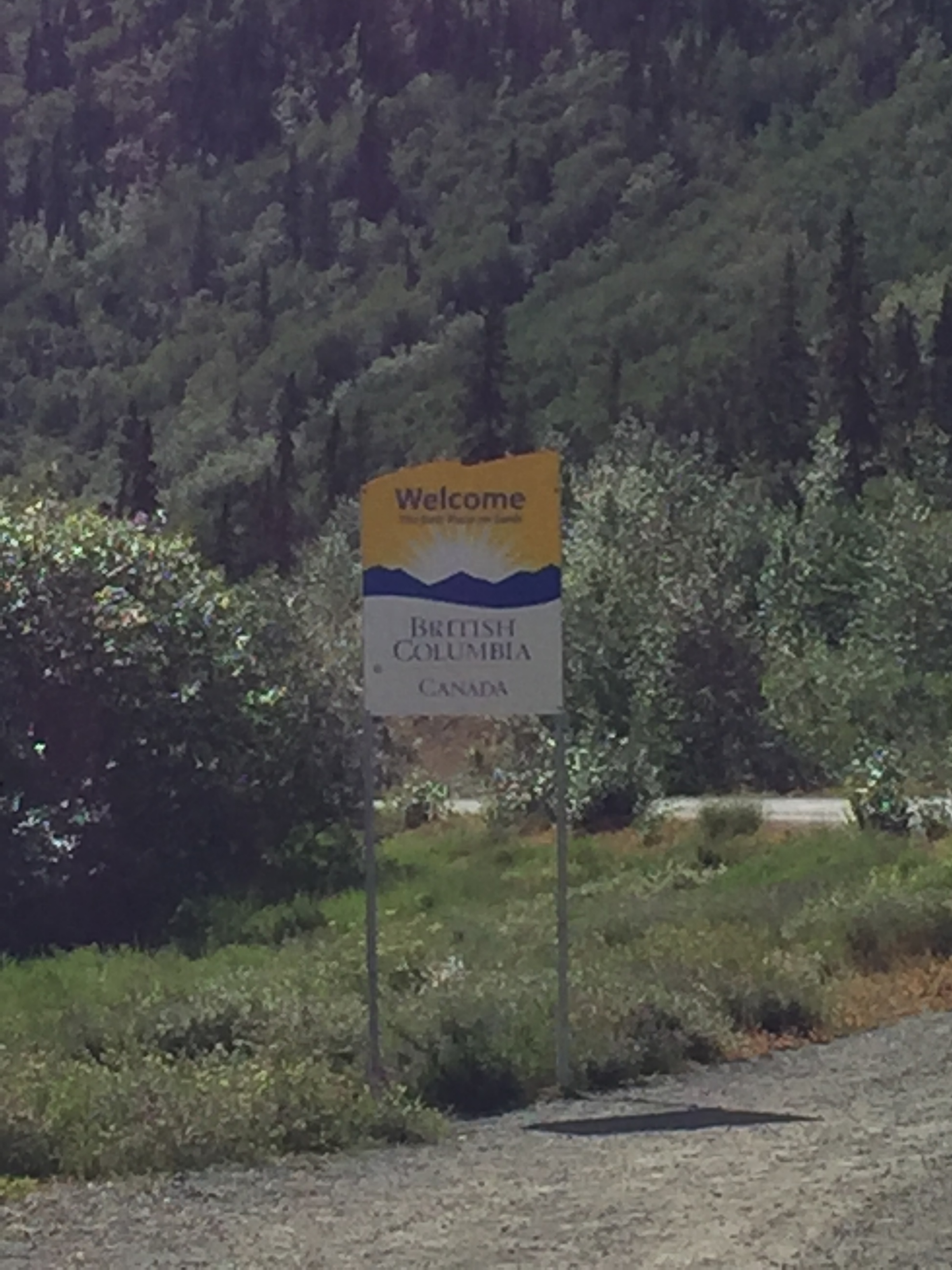
British Columbia sign along Klondike Highway, Canada

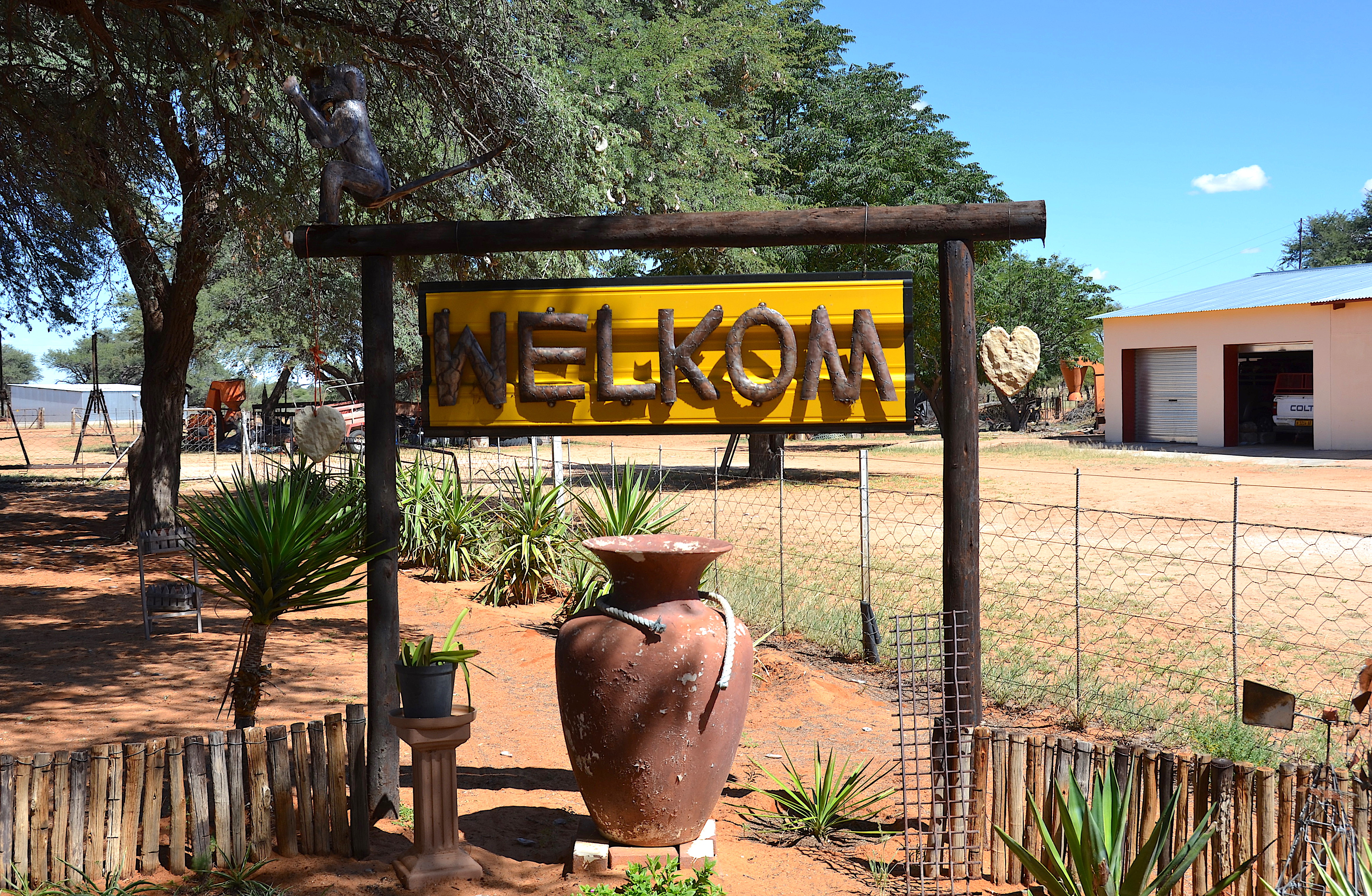
Welcome sign on Farm Gunsteling in Namibia, c. 2017

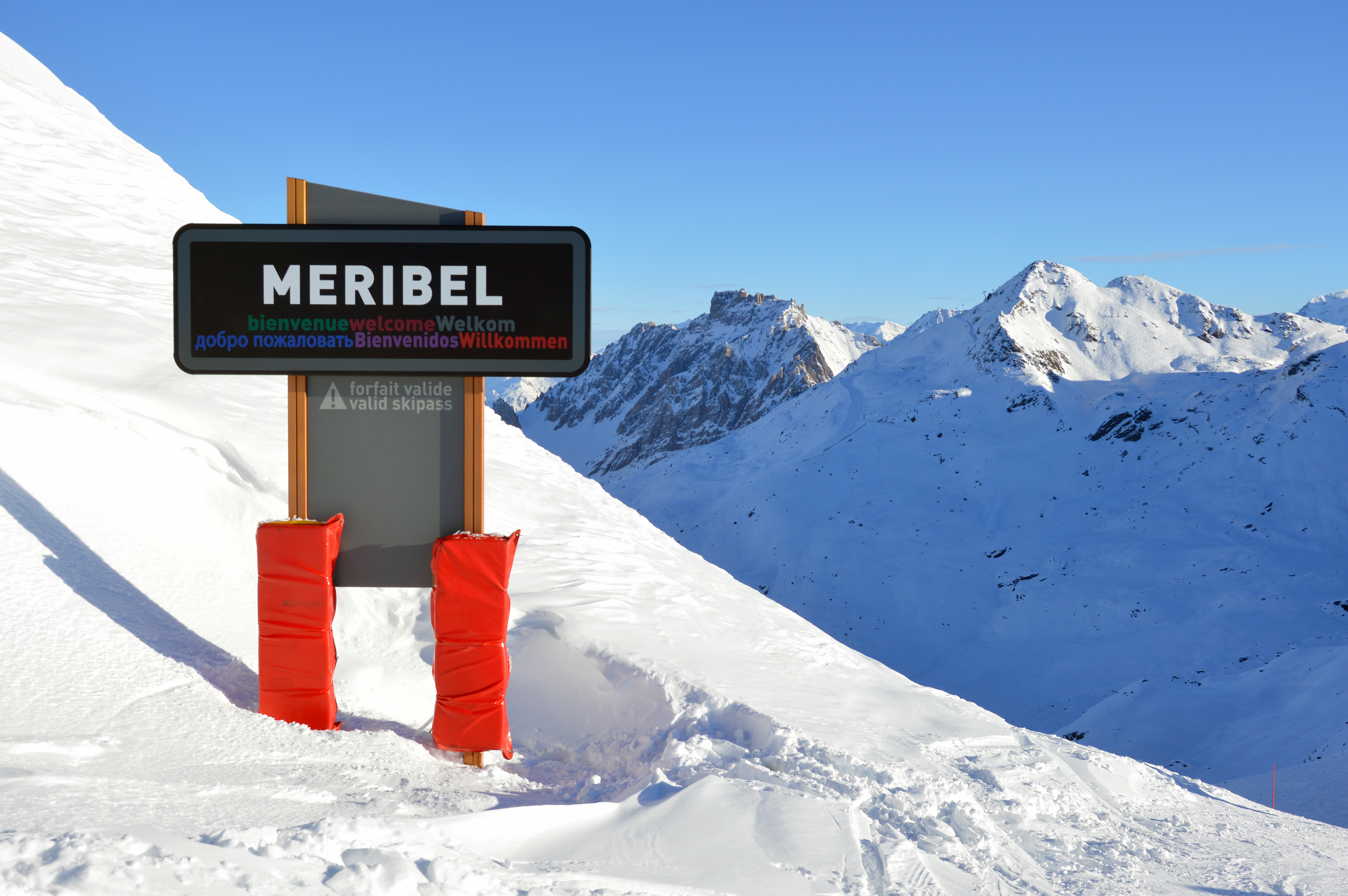
Méribel welcome sign, placed between different areas of the linked ski resort Les Trois Vallées

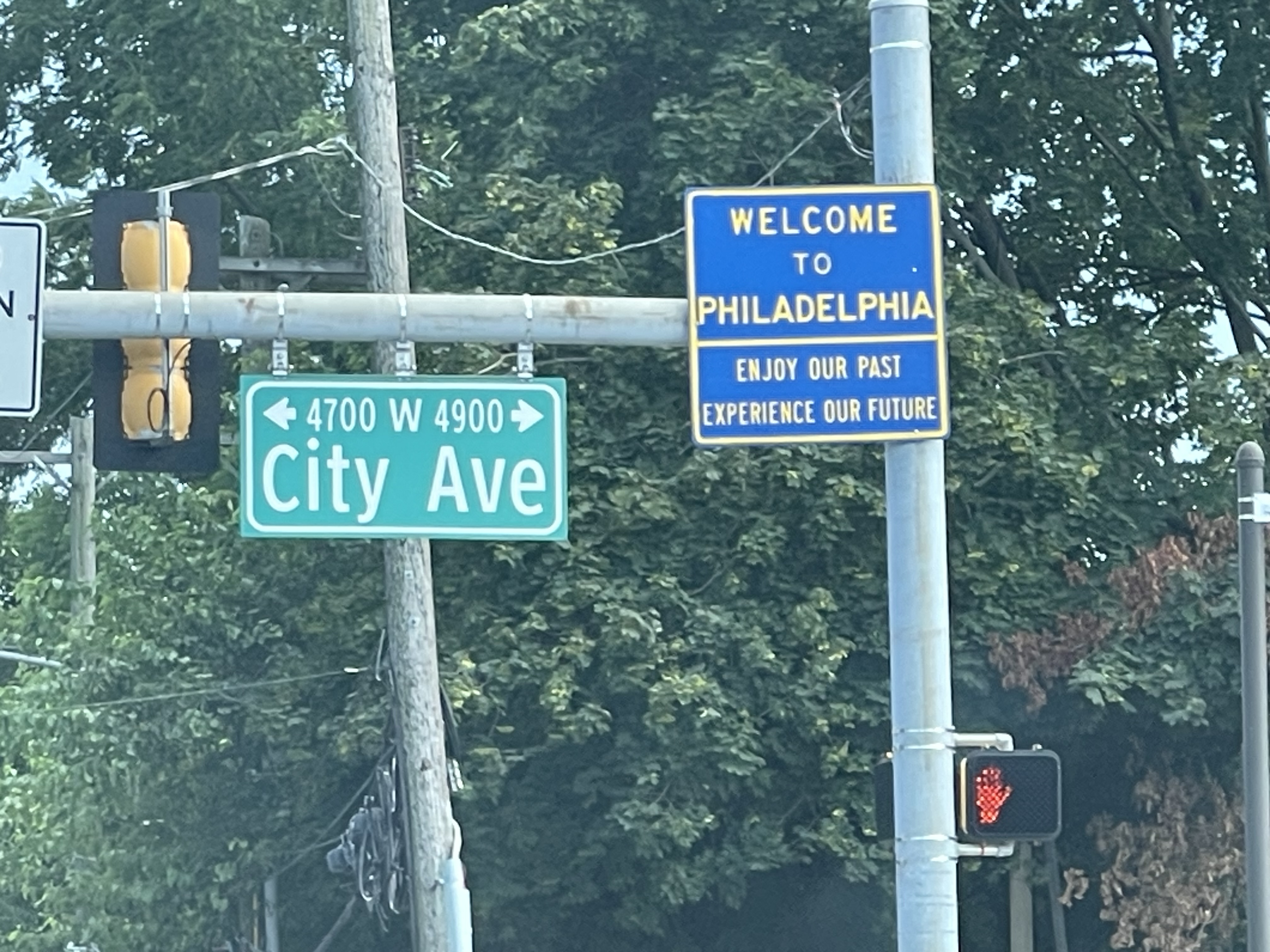
Philadelphia, Pennsylvania along its northern border on City Avenue

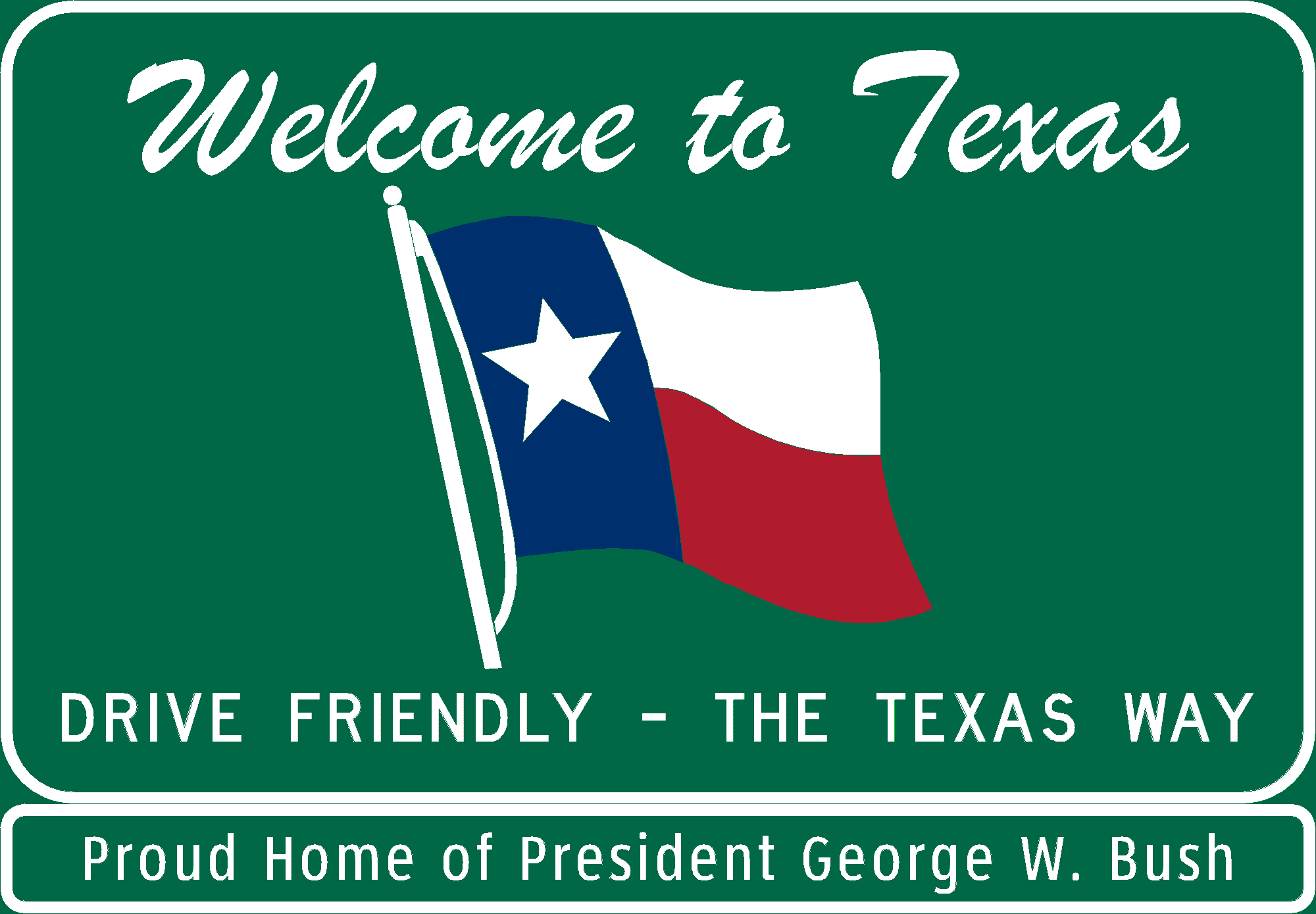
Texas state welcome sign, c. 2008

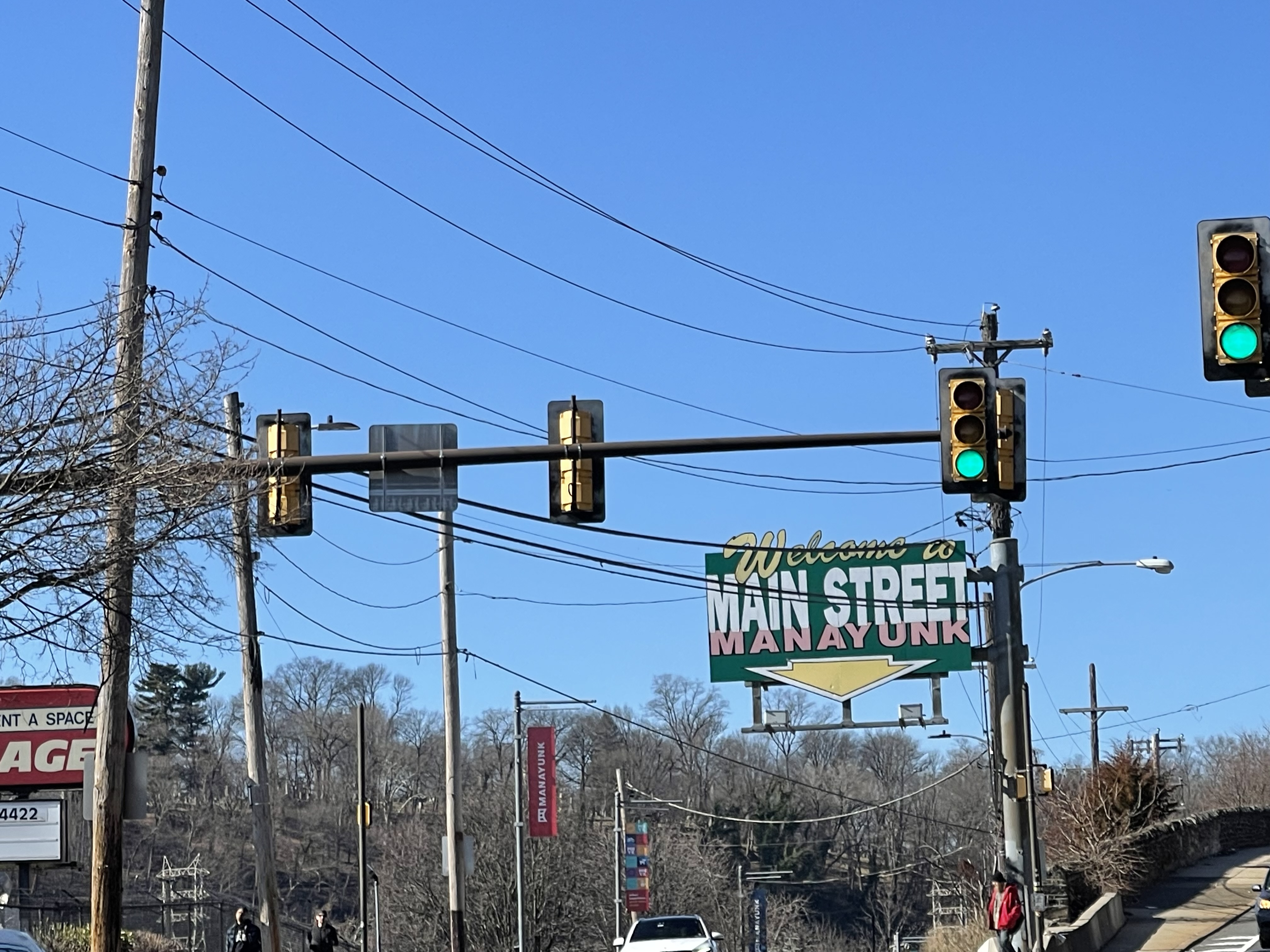
Welcome to Main Street Manayunk, Philadelphia sign

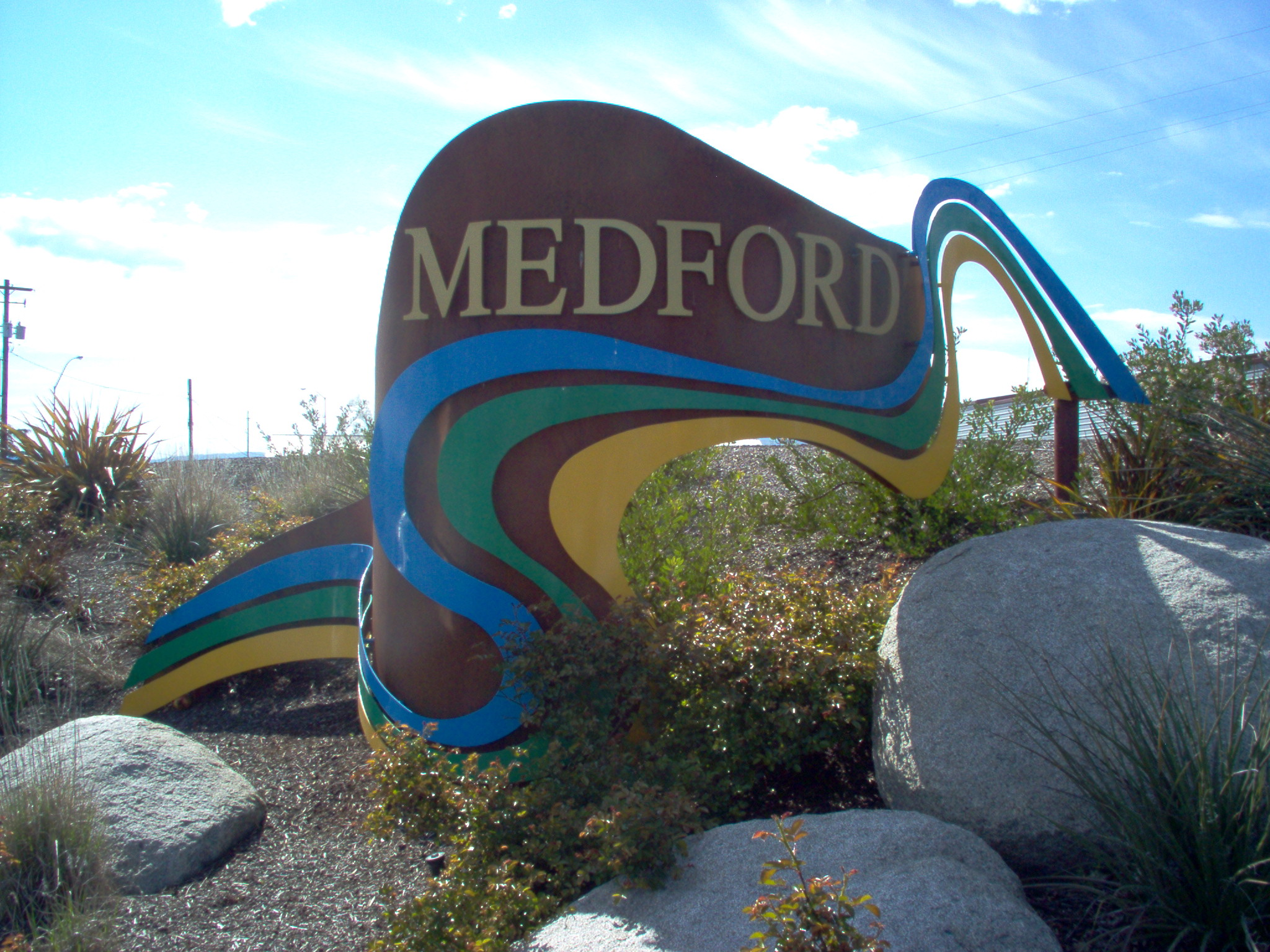
Welcome sign in Medford, Oregon
