= Byrrill Creek =

- Location within New South Wales

Location
- Country: Australia
- State: New South Wales
- Region: Northern Rivers
- Local government area: Tweed Shire

Physical characteristics
- Source: Bar Mountain
  - location: near Byrrill Creek
  - elevation: 213 m (699 ft)
- Mouth: confluence with the Tweed River
  - location: Terragon
  - coordinates: 28°26′24″S 153°16′56″E
  - elevation: 42.7 m (140 ft)
- Length: 17.9 km (11.1 mi)

Basin features
- River system: Tweed River catchment

The Byrrill Creek is a perennial stream located in Northern Rivers region in the state of New South Wales, Australia. It is the namesake of the locality of the same name.

== Course and features ==
Byrrill Creek rises below Bar Mountain on the eastern slopes of the Tweed Range, near Byrrill Creek, and flows generally northeast, and then east, before reaching its confluence with the Tweed River near Terragon. The river descends 171 metres (561 ft) over its 17.9 kilometres (11.1 mi) course.

In 2007, the federal government proposed damming the Rous River, Oxley River and Byrill Creek.

== See also ==
- Rivers of New South Wales
- List of rivers of New South Wales (A-K)
- List of rivers of Australia
