= Rous River =

Rous River North Arm Tweed River
- The mouth of the Rous River, located in New South Wales
- Etymology: In honour of Henry John Rous

Location
- Country: Australia
- State: New South Wales
- Region: NSW North Coast (IBRA), Northern Rivers
- LGA: Tweed
- City: Murwillumbah

Physical characteristics
- Source: Mount Hobwee, McPherson Range
  - location: near Numinbah
  - elevation: 217 m (712 ft)
- Mouth: confluence with the Tweed River
  - location: Tumbulgum
  - coordinates: 28°16′26″S 153°27′32″E
  - elevation: 0 m (0 ft)
- Length: 44 km (27 mi)

Basin features
- River system: Tweed River catchment
- Tributaries
  - left: Crystal Creek (Rous), Nobbys Creek
  - right: Hopkins Creek, Jacksons Creek (New South Wales)
- Nature reserve: Limpinwood Nature Reserve

Rous River, a perennial river of the Tweed River catchment, is located in the Northern Rivers region of New South Wales, Australia.

== Course and features ==
Rous River rises below Mount Hobwee on the southern slopes of the McPherson Range, near Numinbah on the New South Wales-Queensland border, and flows generally east by south, and then east, joined by four minor tributaries, before reaching its confluence with the Tweed River at Tumbulgum, northeast of Murwillumbah. The river descends 217 metres (712 ft) over its 44-kilometre (27 mi) course.

In its upper reaches, Rous River is fed by a minor tributary, Hopkins Creek, on the southern slopes of the McPherson Range, south of Mount Merino; and downriver of Numinbah near the small villages of Chillingham, Jacksons Creek enters the river. In its lower reaches, Rous River is fed by two minor tributaries, Nobbys Creek and Crystal Creek that emerge from the Numinbah Nature Reserve, south of Springbrook.

=== Adjustments to the natural flow of the river ===
In January 2006, partially treated sewerage entered the river from emergency tanks and ponds after storage at the Murwillumbah treatment plant, which had been off-line due to damage, was filled beyond capacity. Biological testing indicated the river water was hazardous which led to a temporary swimming ban.

In 2007, the federal government proposed damming the Rous River, Oxley River and Byrrill Creek. Local opposition to the plan was formed via the Save the Caldera Rivers Campaign, in an effort to stop the proposed dams from being built.

== See also ==
- List of rivers of Australia
