= Chillingham, New South Wales =

Village in New South Wales, Australia

Chillingham
- Town
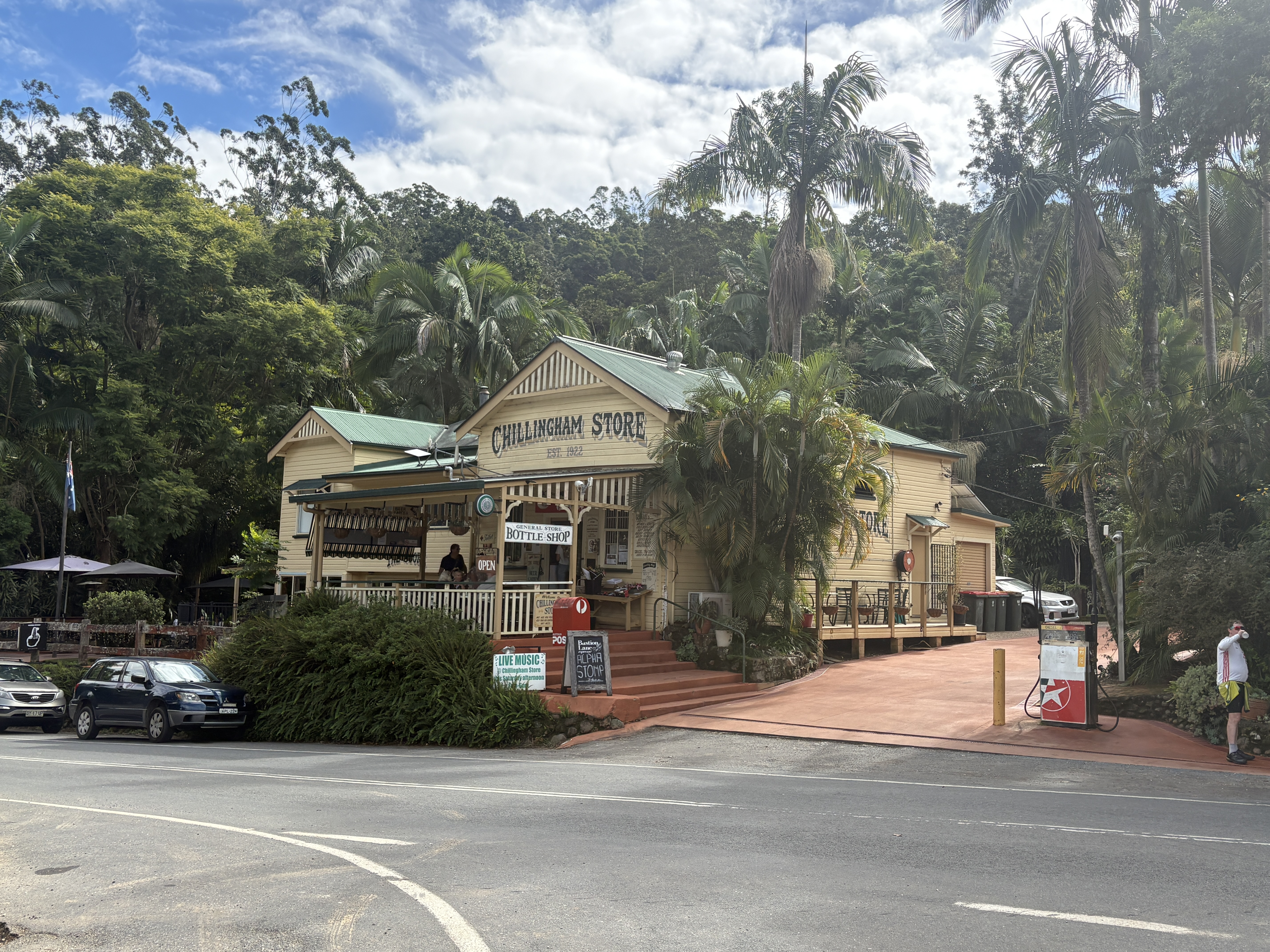
- The Chillingham Store, 2026

- Coordinates: 28.314°S 153.273°E
- Country: Australia
- State: New South Wales
- LGA: Tweed Shire
- Location: 14 km (8.7 mi) NW of Murwillumbah

Government
  - State electorate: Lismore
  - Federal division: Richmond

Population
  - Total: 228 (SAL 2021)
- Postcode: 2484

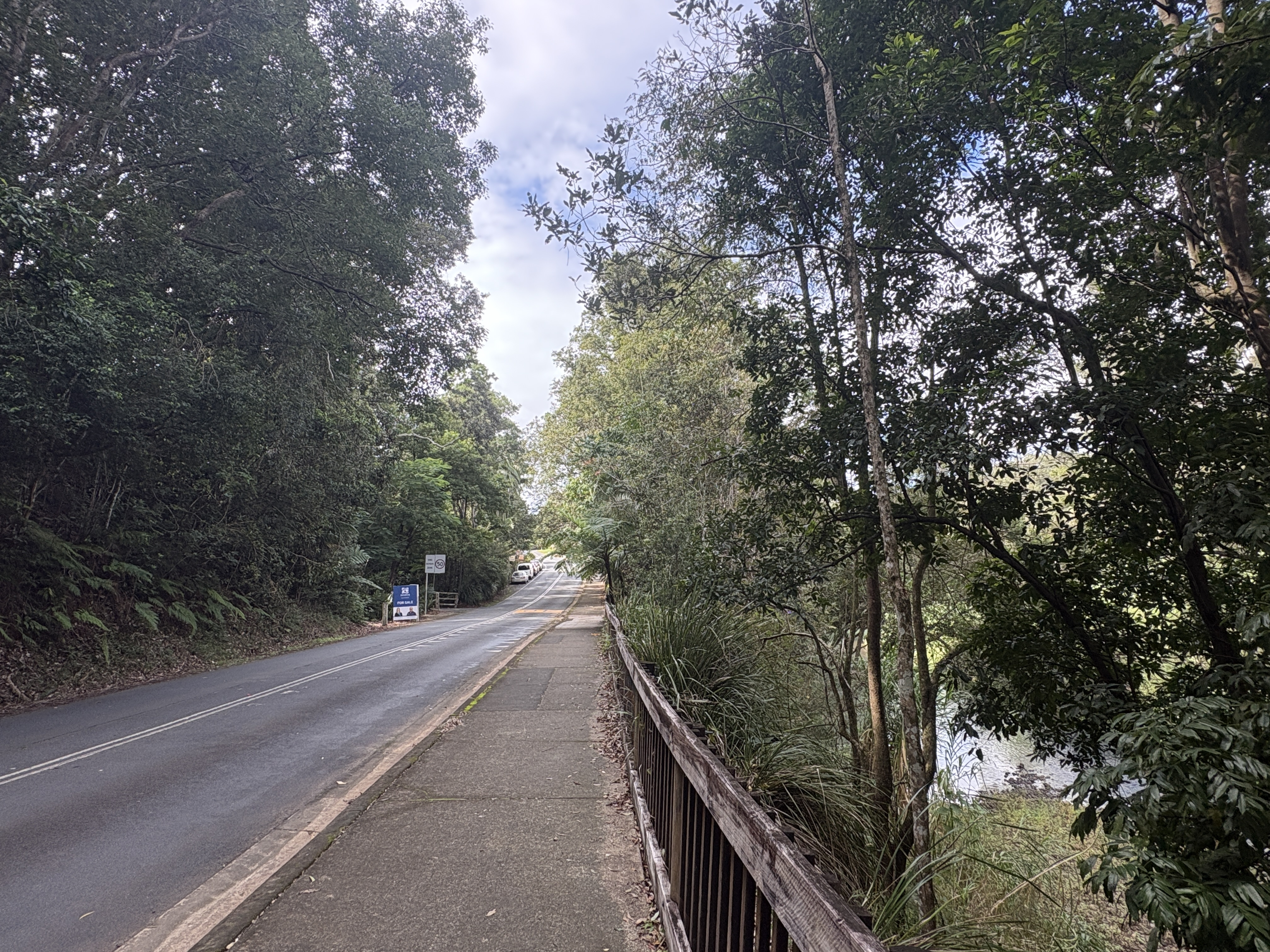
The main road through Chillingham, 2026

Chillingham is a small village approximately 14 kilometres (8.7 mi) northwest of Murwillumbah in the Tweed Valley, New South Wales, Australia. The Rous River, a tributary of the Tweed River, flows through the town.

The Ngandowal and Minyungbal speaking people of the Bundjalung people are the traditional owners of the Tweed region, including Chillingham, and the surrounding areas.

Chillingham Post Office opened on 28 May 1923. A Telegraph Office had been open since 1913, known for some months as Bean Tree.
