= Oxley River =

Oxley River Middle Arm Tweed River
- The mouth of the Oxley River, located in New South Wales
- Etymology: In honour of explorer, John Oxley

Location
- Country: Australia
- State: New South Wales
- Region: NSW North Coast (IBRA)
- LGA: Tweed
- City: Murwillumbah

Physical characteristics
- Source: Mount Durigan, McPherson Range
- Source confluence: Hopping Dicks Creek and Tyalgum Creek
  - location: near Tyalgum
  - elevation: 85 m (279 ft)
- Mouth: confluence with the Tweed River
  - location: Byangum, near Murwillumbah
  - coordinates: 28°21′20″S 153°21′38″E
  - elevation: 7 m (23 ft)
- Length: 23 km (14 mi)

Basin features
- River system: Tweed River catchment
- National park: Mount Warning NP

Oxley River, a perennial river of the Tweed River catchment, is located in the Northern Rivers region of New South Wales, Australia.

== Course and features ==
Formed by the confluence of the Hopping Dicks Creek and Tyalgum Creek, Oxley River rises below Mount Durigan on the southern slopes of the McPherson Range, near Tyalgum, and flows generally south by east, and then east, before reaching its confluence with the Tweed River near Murwillumbah. The river descends 78 metres (256 ft) over its 23 kilometres (14 mi) course.

In 2007, the federal government proposed damming the Rous River, Oxley River and Byrrill Creek. Local opposition to the plan was formed via the Save the Caldera Rivers Campaign, in an effort to stop the proposed dams from being built.

== See also ==
- List of rivers of Australia
