= Tweed River (New South Wales) =

River in northern New South Wales, Australia

Tweed River South Arm Tweed River, Jerrys Creek
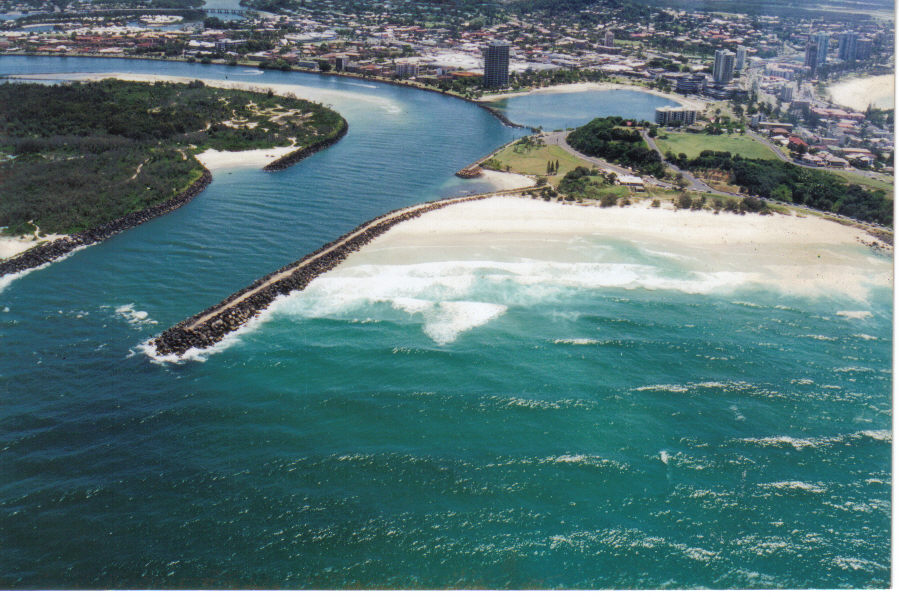
- View of Tweed River mouth and Duranbah Beach.

- Location of the Tweed River mouth in New South Wales
- Etymology: River Tweed

Location
- Country: Australia
- State: New South Wales
- Region: New South Wales North Coast (IBRA), Northern Rivers
- LGA: Tweed
- City: Murwillumbah, Tweed Heads

Physical characteristics
- Source: McPherson, Burringbar, Condong and Tweed ranges
  - location: near Lillian Rock
  - elevation: 169 m (554 ft)
- Mouth: Coral Sea, South Pacific Ocean
  - location: Point Danger
  - coordinates: 28°10′10″S 153°33′23″E
- Length: 78 km (48 mi)
- Basin size: 1,055 km^{2} (407 sq mi)
- Discharge
  - location: Near mouth
  - average: 24.8 m^{3}/s (780 GL/a)

Basin features
- Tributaries
  - left: Byrrill Creek, Korrumbyn Creek, Oxley River, Rous River
  - right: Doon Doon Creek, Smiths Creek (Tweed), Rolands Creek, Dunbible Creek
- National park: Wollumbin National Park

The Tweed River is a river situated in the Northern Rivers region of New South Wales, Australia. From the middle reaches of its course, the state boundary between New South Wales and Queensland is located approximately 10 kilometres (6.2 mi) north.

The river rises on the eastern slopes of the Great Dividing Range; with its watershed bordered by the McPherson, Burringbar, Condong and Tweed ranges and containing a catchment area of 1,055 km^{2} (407 sq mi). The river flows generally north east, joined by eight tributaries including the Oxley and Rous rivers before reaching its mouth at its confluence with the Coral Sea of the South Pacific Ocean, south of Point Danger, descending 173 metres (568 ft) over its 78-kilometre (48 mi) course.

On its journey, it passes through the major urban centres of Murwillumbah and Tweed Heads.

The river's drainage basin consists mostly of the erosion caldera of the Tweed Volcano, a huge extinct volcano of which Mount Warning is the volcanic plug. The Tweed River area has a fine subtropical climate, high rainfall and fertile volcanic soils. It was originally covered by rainforest, much of which has been cleared. Some remains in several national parks and reserves. The lowlands along the river are used for farming sugar cane and other crops.

The surrounding Tweed Shire is a local government area of New South Wales. Each year the river hosts a number of major aquatic events. The lower reaches of the Tweed River are a good recreational fishing site. Waterskiing, pleasure boating and rowing are other popular activities on the lower reaches of the river.

== History ==
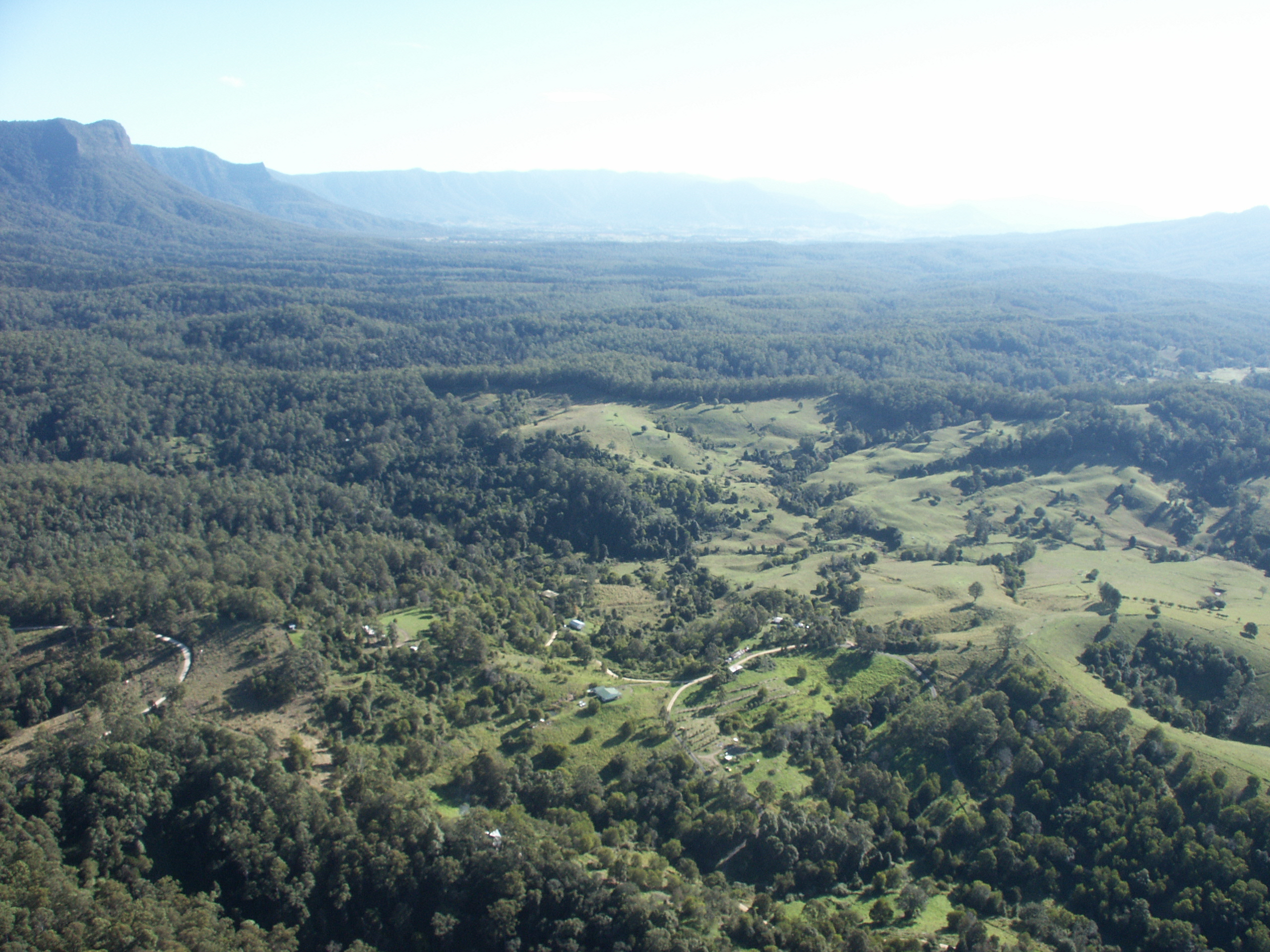
Upper Tweed Valley

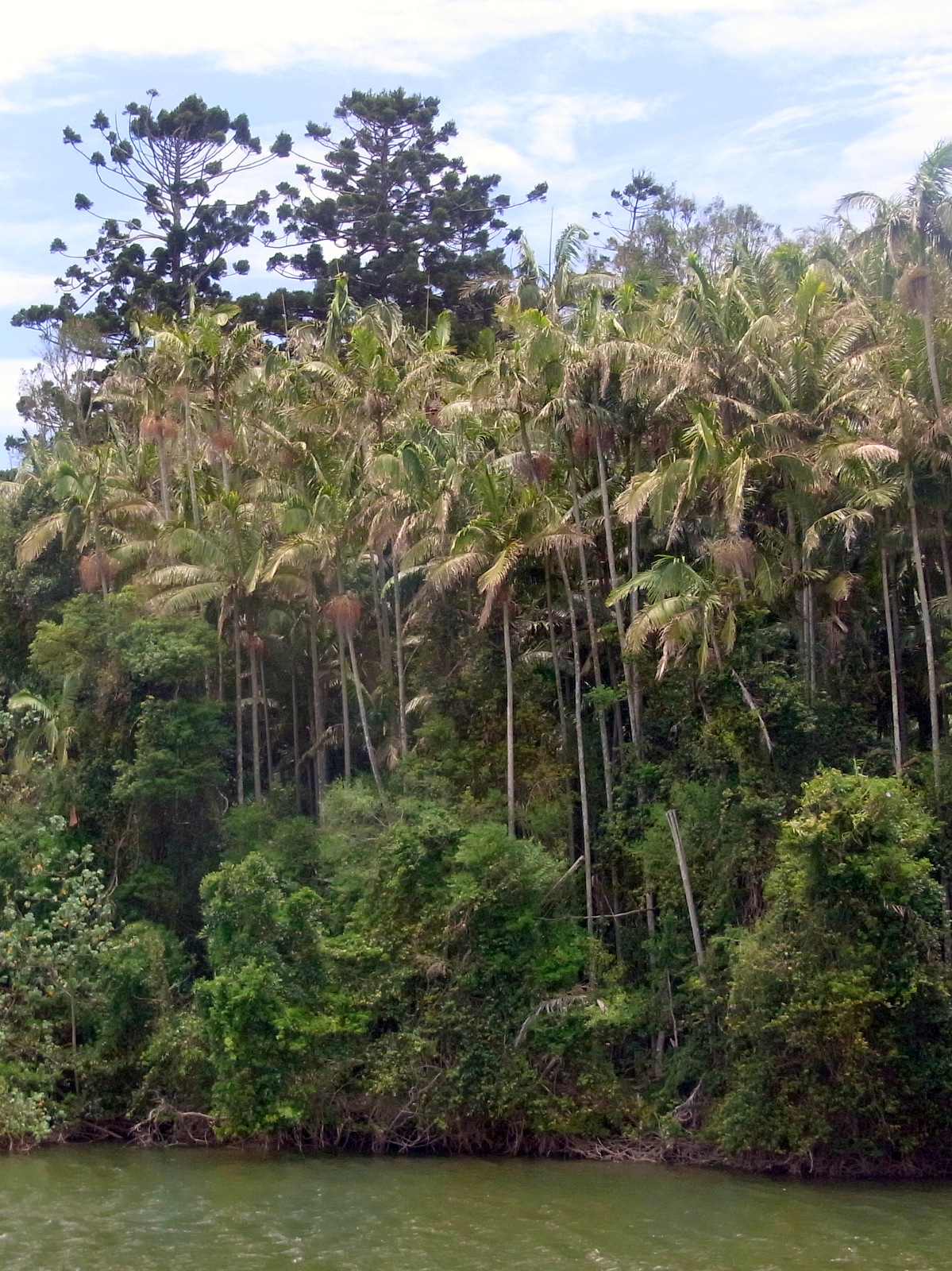
Stotts Island at Tumbulgum, 2012

=== Aboriginal history ===
The traditional custodians of the land surrounding the Tweed River are the Aboriginal people of the Minyungbul, Tulgi-gin, Cudgenburra, and Mooburra dialects. Yugembah (also known as Yugumbir, Jugambel, Jugambeir, Jugumbir, Jukam, Jukamba) is one of the Australian Aboriginal languages in areas that include the Tweed River Valley, Gold Coast, Logan, Scenic Rim, Albert River, Beaudesert, Beenleigh, Coolangatta, Coomera, Logan River, Pimpama and Tamborine, within the local government boundaries of the City of Gold Coast, City of Logan, Scenic Rim Regional Council and the Tweed River Valley.

=== European discovery and naming ===
The first European explorer to see the river was John Oxley, in 1823. As Surveyor General, Oxley made a close examination of the Tweed River and Port Curtis, and sources connected that investigation, principally the manuscript journal kept by Oxley, and the published Narrative of John Uniaeke, who accompanied Oxley. The following is an extract from Oxley's notebook entry for 31 October 1823:

Fri.31 October

At 3[PM] made sail intending to anchor to the South of Point Danger. At 5[PM] passed close to a Bold Headland [present-day Point Danger] about 3 Miles North of Pt. D. [Cook's Point Danger - Fingal Head] On the South Side of this headland we had the satisfaction to discover a considerable river with an apparent clear entrance. Hove on for the purpose of anchoring between the Island and the Main land [Fingal Head]. At ½ past 5 passing too close to the Island we shoaled our "water to 2 ½ fms but almost instantly deepened to 5 fms. Anchored under the lee of the Island in 7 fms sandy Bottom being tolerably sheltered from the SSE round by the w to NE - the distance between the Island and the Main is about 50 chains, the point of the Main as well as the Island composed of regular Basaltic Pillars. To the South extends a Sandy Beach of about 3 ½ miles ending in a low sandy Point off which brakers seem to extend about ¾ of a mile. Soundings between the Island and the Main and found the deepest water 6 fms in mid channel rather including to the Mainland. Observed the River from the Mast head take a SW direction running through a moderately elevated country towards the Base of Mt. Warning.

John Uniack made the following relevant observations.

Monday 27 October 1823: The wind being fair, we immediately got under way, and continued our course to the northward till Friday afternoon, when it shifted, and came on to blow so hard, that we determined to run in shore and look out for anchorage; this we found under the lee of a small island off Point Danger (so named by Captain Cook), about a mile from the land. While running down for this place, we perceived the mouth of a large river about a mile and a half to the northward; and next morning at daylight the master was dispatched in the whale-boat to ascertain the possibility of taking the vessel into it.

Shortly afterwards, Mr. Stirling and I landed on the island with our guns. The rocks which formed the base was evidently of volcanic origin: it was of dark colour, full of small holes and extremely hard, while on the western side many regular circular cavities, some of which were about four or five yards in diameter at top, and tapered down gradually towards the bottom, which was usually filled with round stones.

One of these holes, in particular, had a communication underneath with the sea, and at every returning surf threw up considerable quantities of water with a loud noise. The superincumbent rocks were basaltic, and those of a small rock to the N.W. of the island, as well as those of a bluff headland, immediately opposite on the main, were inferior only in extent to the Giant’s Causeway in the north of Ireland.

John Uniack also noted:

"The little island under which we lay received the name of Turtle Island, in gratitude for the abundant supply of that fish which we procured from it. We also gave the name of 'Tweed' to the river. The latitude of our anchorage is 28° 8' S. and its longitude 153° 31'"

Captain Phillip Parker King had previously surveyed that portion of the coast in the proximity of Point Danger, although adverse weather conditions prevented his examining that portion too closely. His observations, as recorded on 22 and 23 May 1819, are as follows:

22. The next evening, Mount Warning was seen from the deck, although we were at least seventy-eight miles from it. 23 on the 23d at noon, our latitude was 28°9' when the Mount bore S 58° W (Magnetic).

At sunset the wind died away; and, from the land in the vicinity of the mountain indicating every appearance of the existence of either a large sheet of water or an opening of consequence, I was induced to remain two days to examine the beach more narrowly; but, after beating about with a strong south-easterly current which prevented my tracing the beach to the northward of the Mount, and having only seen an inconsiderable opening that communicates by a shoal channel with a small lagoon at the back of the beach, I gave up the search; still without satisfying myself of the non-existence of an inlet, which, if there be one, probably communicates with the sea nearer to Point Danger.

Lieut Oxley has since (1823) discovered this to be the case, for he found a stream empting itself into the sea, by a bar harbour close to Point Danger. Lieutenant Oxley called it the Tweed.

In the Appendix to the second volume of that work, containing a description of the ports, islands and coast between Port Jackson and Breakesea Spit, the following description of the Tweed River confirms that Captain King clearly considered Point Danger to be the southernmost of the two points:

The Tweed is a river communicating with the sea by a bar, on which there is twelve feet of water, it is situated about a mile and a half to the north of a small island off Point Danger, which lies in latitude 28° 8'

Captain Henry Rous further examined the Tweed River in 1828, and incorrectly identified the present-day Point Danger, as the Point Danger of James Cook and recorded the name 'Cook's Island' rather than 'Turtle Island' of Oxley [Rous named Oxley's Tweed the Clarance River]:

The River Clarance, or more properly the Tweed, discovered by Mr. Oxley, but not explored, is in lat. 28° 9', long. 153° 34' bearing N.W.½ W. from Turtle Island distant 2 ½ miles – it is situated to the southward of a Bluff Head, connected with the Main by a flat sandy Isthmus, 250 yards wide from high water mark forming a boundary to the river on one side, and to capacious bay to the northward – affording good anchorage and shelter from East Southerly to North….There is a small river about 10 miles NW by W from the *north bluff of Point Danger inaccessible for boats.

The Tweed was named after the River Tweed in Scotland.

=== Mouth stabilization ===
The first training walls were built in 1891. Between 1898 and 1904, training walls were constructed from Chinderah to the entrance. In 1962, these walls were extended in order to maintain a deep channel. The order failed to stop the channel from shoaling and instead necessitated regular dredging and completely inhibited the longshore transport of sand northwards. The southern Gold Coast beaches were soon faced with intense erosion during storms which was not replenished.

By 1998 the river entrance was dredged clear of sand for navigable purposes. Three million cubic metres of sand had been removed from the river mouth. In 2001, an artificial sand bypass system was implemented, in part based on the successful operation of the Gold Coast Seaway. The level of sand on southern Gold Coast beaches soon returned to pre-1960s levels.

==== Colloquial use ====
Even though parts of the river are a few kilometres within the New South Wales side of the border, the expression "North of the Tweed" is used to refer to the people and places of Queensland; likewise, "South of the Tweed" is a term used by Queenslanders regarding the southern states of Australia. The term probably originates from southern Australians' summer vacation trips driving along the Pacific Highway through the scenic New South Wales North Coast. The highway crosses many rivers along its route, with the Tweed being the last one before reaching the holiday destinations of the Gold Coast, just on the other side of the Queensland border.

== Course ==
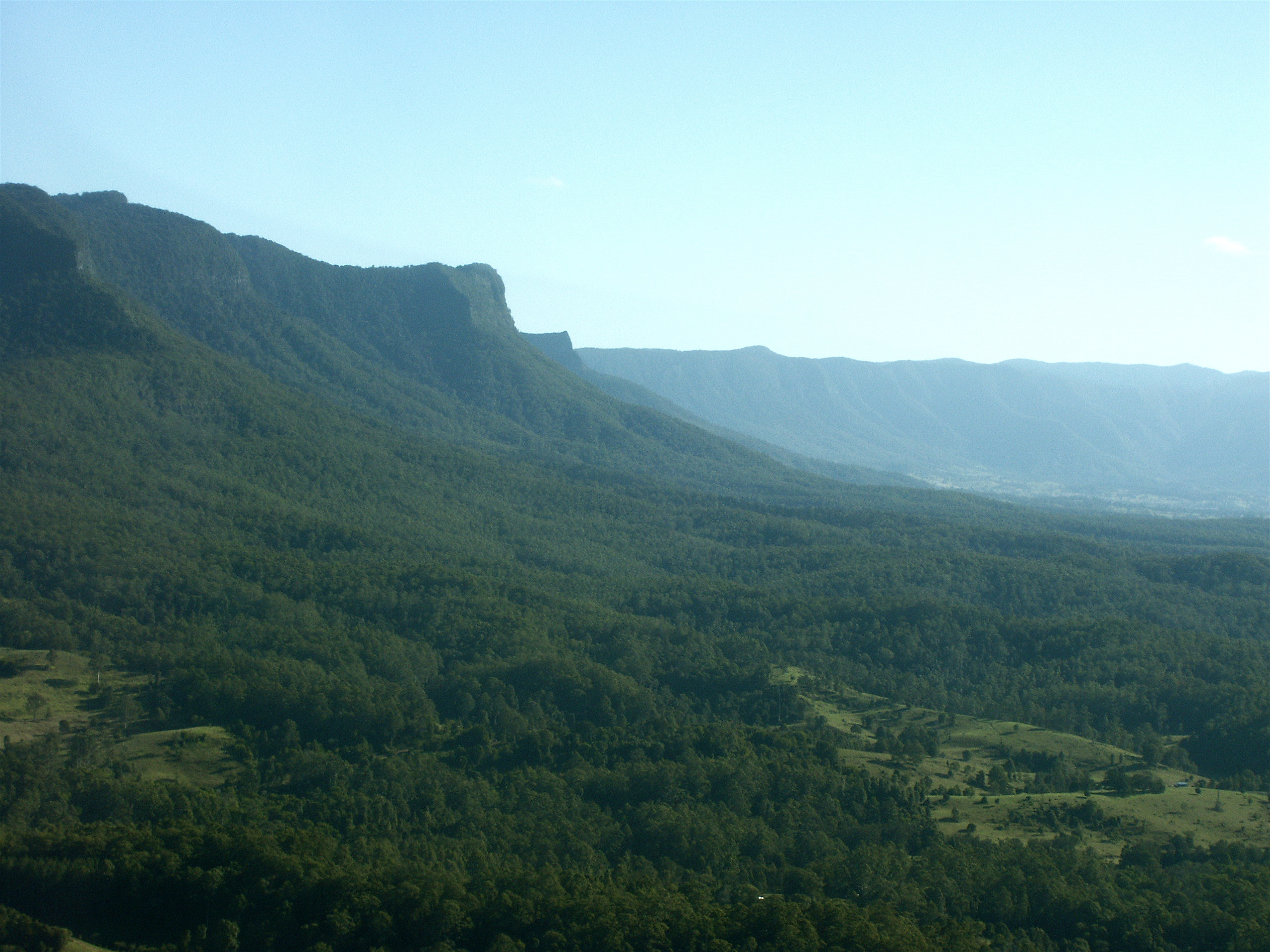
Upper Tweed Valley showing the caldera wall

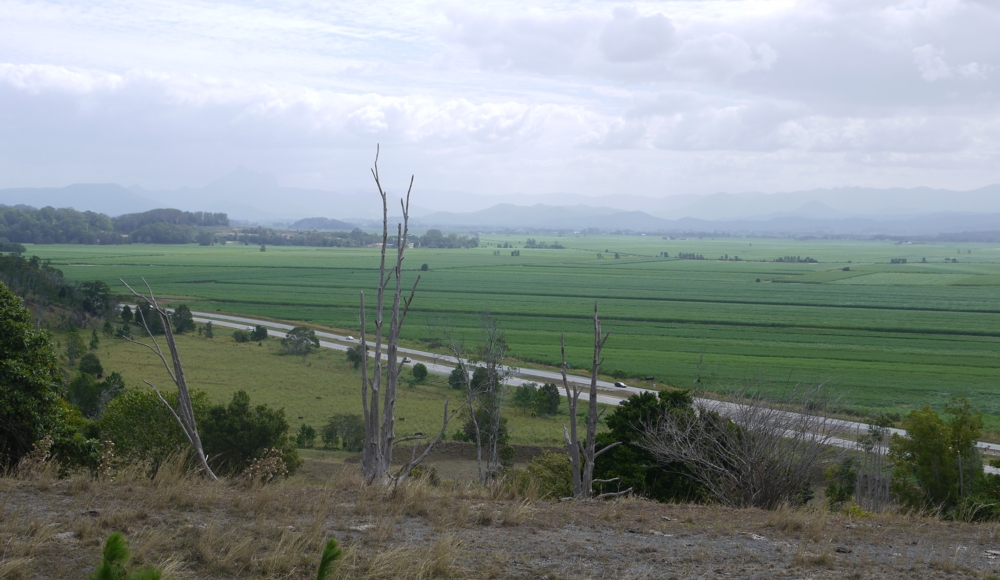
Lower Tweed Valley viewed from Duranbah

The river begins northwest of the village called Lillian Rock. The upper reaches pass through the small villages of Kunghur, Terragon and Uki. South of Mount Warning, Doon Doon Creek and Perch Creek enter the Tweed from its southern banks, and Byrill Creek joins on the northern side near Terragon. Downstream, Korumbyn Creek and then the Oxley River enters the river at Byangum, before it flows through Murwillumbah. At Tumbulgum, the Rous River joins the Tweed. The Terranora and Cobaki creeks enter the Tweed about 2 kilometres (1.2 mi) upstream from the mouth. South of Banora Point, the Pacific Highway crosses the river.

The river's tidal influence reaches beyond Murwillumbah to Bray Park Weir. The estuary of the Tweed River is an important shorebird habitat. Grey mangroves are the predominant mangrove species along the Tweed River.

=== Flooding ===
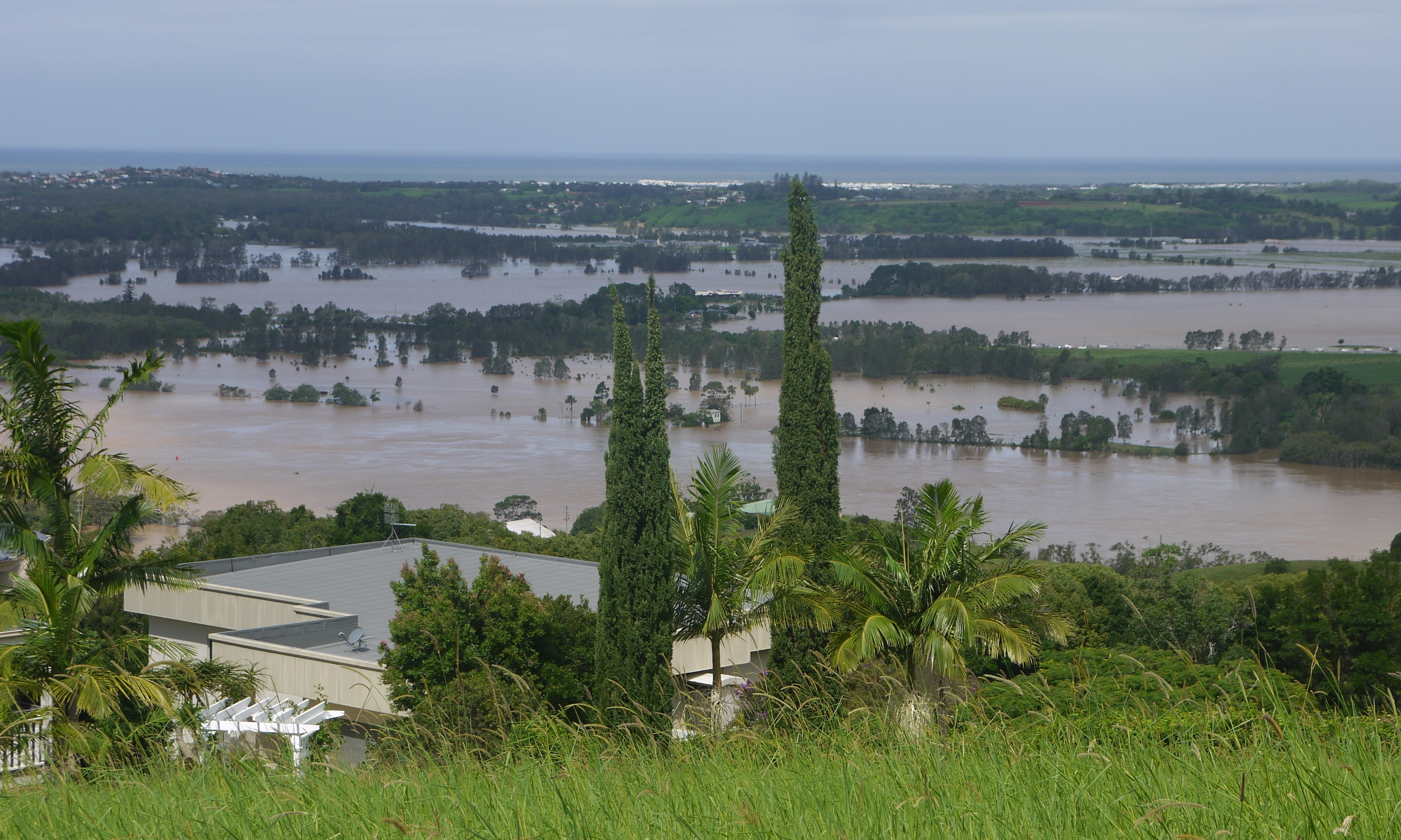
Flooding on the Tweed River. View from Terranora on 1 April 2017

During Cyclone Oswald, the Tweed River was subject to major flooding, brought about due to the storm's residual effects and associated monsoon trough that passed over parts of Queensland and New South Wales. The river peaked at 3.3 metres (11 ft), the highest level recorded in 30 years.

In late March 2017 rainfall from Ex-Tropical Cyclone Debbie caused major flooding in the Tweed Valley, the Murwillumbah gauge recording a peak of 6.2 metres.

=== Mouth ===
There is a sand bypassing system operating at the mouth of the Tweed River. A jetty on the northern end of Letitia Spit that collects sand and then pumps it under the Tweed River to beaches in the neighbouring state of Queensland. Outlets for the Tweed River Entrance Sand Bypassing System include Duranbah Beach, Snapper Rocks East, Snapper Rocks West, Greenmount and Kirra. Dredging of the navigation entrance is also undertaken regularly as part of the overall sand bypassing program. The width of the Tweed River mouth is about 150 metres (490 ft).

The Indo-Pacific humpback dolphin reaches its southern extent of its distribution at the river mouth.

== See also ==
- Rivers of New South Wales
- List of rivers of Australia
