= Byrrill Creek, New South Wales =

Byrrill Creek
- Town
- Coordinates: 28°26′24″S 153°14′4″E
- Country: Australia
- State: New South Wales
- Region: NSW
- LGA: Tweed Shire
- Location: 155.5 km (96.6 mi) S of Brisbane; 792 km (492 mi) N of Sydney

Government
  - State electorate: Tweed
  - Federal division: Richmond

Population
  - Total: 124 (2016 census)
- Time zone: UTC+10 (AEST)
  - Summer (DST): UTC+11 (AEDT)
- Postcode: 2484
- County: Australia

Byrrill Creek is a town in the Tweed Shire, in north-eastern New South Wales, Australia. At the 2016 census, it had a population of 124.

The Ngandowal and Minyungbal speaking people of the Bundjalung people are the traditional owners of the Tweed region, including Byrill Creek, and the surrounding areas.
