= South Murwillumbah =

Suburb of Tweed Heads, New South Wales, Australia

- Suburb
- Interactive map of South Murwillumbah
- Coordinates: 28.3402°S 153.4133°E
- Country: Australia
- State: New South Wales
- City: Murwillumbah
- LGA: Tweed Shire
- Location: 129 km (80 mi) SSE of Brisbane

Government
  - State electorate: Tweed
  - Federal division: Richmond

Population
  - Total: 1,064 (2011 census)
- Time zone: UTC+10 (AEST)
  - Summer (DST): UTC+11 (AEDT)
- Postcode: 2484
Suburbs around South Murwillumbah
Murwillumbah	Tygalgah	Condong
Murwillumbah	South Murwillumbah	Kielvale
Dunbible	Fernvale	Wardrop

South Murwillumbah is a locality located in north-eastern New South Wales, Australia, in the Tweed Shire.

== Demographics ==
In the 2011 census, South Murwillumbah recorded a population of 1,064 people, 49.2% female and 50.8% male.

The median age of the South Murwillumbah population was 41 years, 4 years above the national median of 37.

87.8% of people living in South Murwillumbah were born in Australia. The other top responses for country of birth were England 2.2%, New Zealand 1.7%, Scotland 0.7%, India 0.6%, Fiji 0.3%.

92.5% of people spoke only English at home; the next most common languages were 0.3% Punjabi, 0.3% French, 0.3% Hebrew, 0.3% Italian, 0.3% Mandarin.

== Heritage listings ==
Murwillumbah has a number of heritage-listed sites, including:

- Casino-Murwillumbah railway: Murwillumbah railway station
