= Eviron, New South Wales =

Suburb of Tweed Shire, New South Wales, Australia

Eviron New South Wales
- Coordinates: 28°18′19″S 153°28′58″E
- Population: 229 (SAL 2021)
- Postcode(s): 2484
- Elevation: 2 m (7 ft)
- Time zone: AEST (UTC+10)
  - Summer (DST): AEDT (UTC+11)
- Location: 12.9 km (8 mi) E of Murwillumbah; 22.5 km (14 mi) SW of Tweed Heads; 129 km (80 mi) SSE of Brisbane; 809 km (503 mi) N of Sydney
- LGA(s): Tweed Shire
- Region: Northern Rivers
- State electorate(s): Lismore
- Federal division(s): Richmond
Suburbs around Eviron:
Tumbulgum	Tumbulgum	Stotts Creek
Condong	Eviron	Duranbah
Nunderi	Farrants Hill	Tanglewood

Eviron is a small rural locality approximately 22 kilometres (14 mi) south-west of Tweed Heads in the Tweed Shire, part of the Northern Rivers region of New South Wales, Australia.

At the 2021 census, the town recorded a population of 229.
