= Duranbah, New South Wales =

Town in New South Wales, Australia

Duranbah
- Town
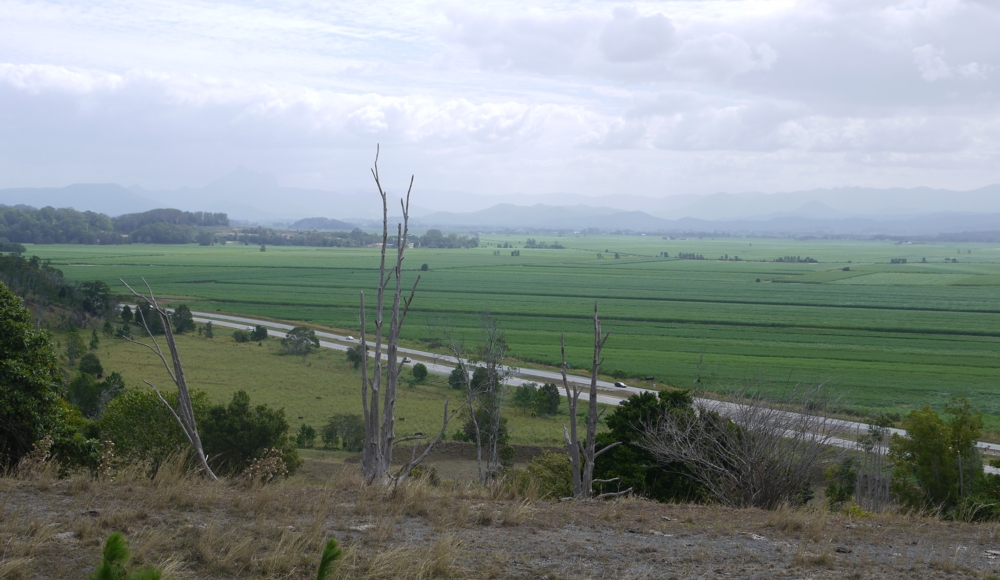
- Pacific Motorway and Tweed Valley viewed from Duranbah

- Coordinates: 28°18′18″S 153°31′21″E
- Country: Australia
- State: New South Wales
- LGA: Tweed Shire
- Location: 104 km (65 mi) SSE of Brisbane; 21 km (13 mi) S of Tweed Heads; 15 km (9.3 mi) E of Murwillumbah; 60 km (37 mi) N of Byron Bay; 805 km (500 mi) NNE of Sydney

Government
  - State electorate: Tweed
  - Federal division: Richmond
- Elevation: 65 m (213 ft)

Population
  - Total: 262 (2011 census)
- Time zone: UTC+10 (AEST)
  - Summer (DST): UTC+11 (AEDT)
Localities around Duranbah
Tumbulgum	Stotts Creek	Cudgen
Eviron	Duranbah	Kings Forest
Farrants Hill	Tanglewood	Cabarita Beach

Duranbah is a town in north-eastern New South Wales, Australia, in the Tweed Shire.

The Ngandowal and Minyungbal speaking people of the Bundjalung people are the traditional owners of the Tweed region, including Duranbah, and the surrounding areas.

== Demographics ==
In the 2011 census, Duranbah recorded a population of 262 people, 50.4% female and 49.6% male.

The median age of the Duranbah population was 36 years, 1 year below the national median of 37.

85.2% of people living in Duranbah were born in Australia. The other top responses for country of birth were England 3.8%, New Zealand 2.3%, Scotland 1.1%, United States of America 1.1%, Indonesia 1.1%.

95% of people spoke only English at home.

== Tropical Fruit World ==
Tropical Fruit World was established in 1972 in Duranbah and is a working farm and tourist attraction.
