= Casuarina, New South Wales =

Town in New South Wales, Australia

Casuarina
- Town
- Coordinates: 28°18′06″S 153°34′17″E
- Country: Australia
- State: New South Wales
- LGA: Tweed Shire
- Location: 117 km (73 mi) SSE of Brisbane; 17 km (11 mi) S of Tweed Heads; 51 km (32 mi) N of Byron Bay; 814 km (506 mi) N of Sydney

Government
  - State electorate: Tweed
  - Federal division: Richmond

Population
  - Total: 3,256 (2021 census)
- Time zone: UTC+10 (AEST)
  - Summer (DST): UTC+11 (AEDT)
- Postcode: 2487
Localities around Casuarina
Cudgen	Kingscliff	Pacific Ocean
Kings Forest	Casuarina	Pacific Ocean
Tanglewood	Cabarita Beach	Pacific Ocean

Casuarina is a town in north-eastern New South Wales, Australia, in the Tweed Shire.

The Ngandowal and Minyungbal speaking people of the Bundjalung people are the traditional owners of the Tweed region, including, Casuarina, and the surrounding areas.

== Demographics ==
In the 2021 Census Casuarina recorded a population of 3,256 people.

The median age of the Casuarina population was 41 years, 2 years above the national median of 38.

79% of people living in Casuarina were born in Australia. The other top responses for country of birth were England (4.5%), New Zealand (3.4%), South Africa (1.6%), United States of America (1.1%).

91% of people spoke only English at home. The next most common languages spoken at home were Portuguese (1%), Spanish (0.5%), German (0.4%), Italian (0.2%), Polish (0.2%).
