= Tanglewood, New South Wales =

Town in New South Wales, Australia

Tanglewood
- Town
- Coordinates: 28.337°S 153.536°E
- Country: Australia
- State: New South Wales
- LGA: Tweed Shire
- Location: 123 km (76 mi) SSE of Brisbane; 24 km (15 mi) S of Tweed Heads; 45 km (28 mi) N of Byron Bay; 805 km (500 mi) N of Sydney

Government
  - State electorate: Electoral district of Tweed
  - Federal division: Division of Richmond
- Elevation: 6 m (20 ft)

Population
  - Total: 97 (2016 census)
- Time zone: UTC+10 (AEST)
  - Summer (DST): UTC+11 (AEDT)
- Postcode: 2488
Localities around Tanglewood
Duranbah	Kings Forest	Cabarita Beach
Clothiers Creek	Tanglewood	Bogangar
Reserve Creek	Round Mountain	Hastings Point

Tanglewood is a town in north-eastern New South Wales, Australia, in the Tweed Shire.

The Ngandowal and Minyungbal speaking people of the Bundjalung people are the traditional owners of the Tweed region, including Tanglewood, and the surrounding areas.
