= Condong, New South Wales =

Village in New South Wales, Australia

Condong
- Town
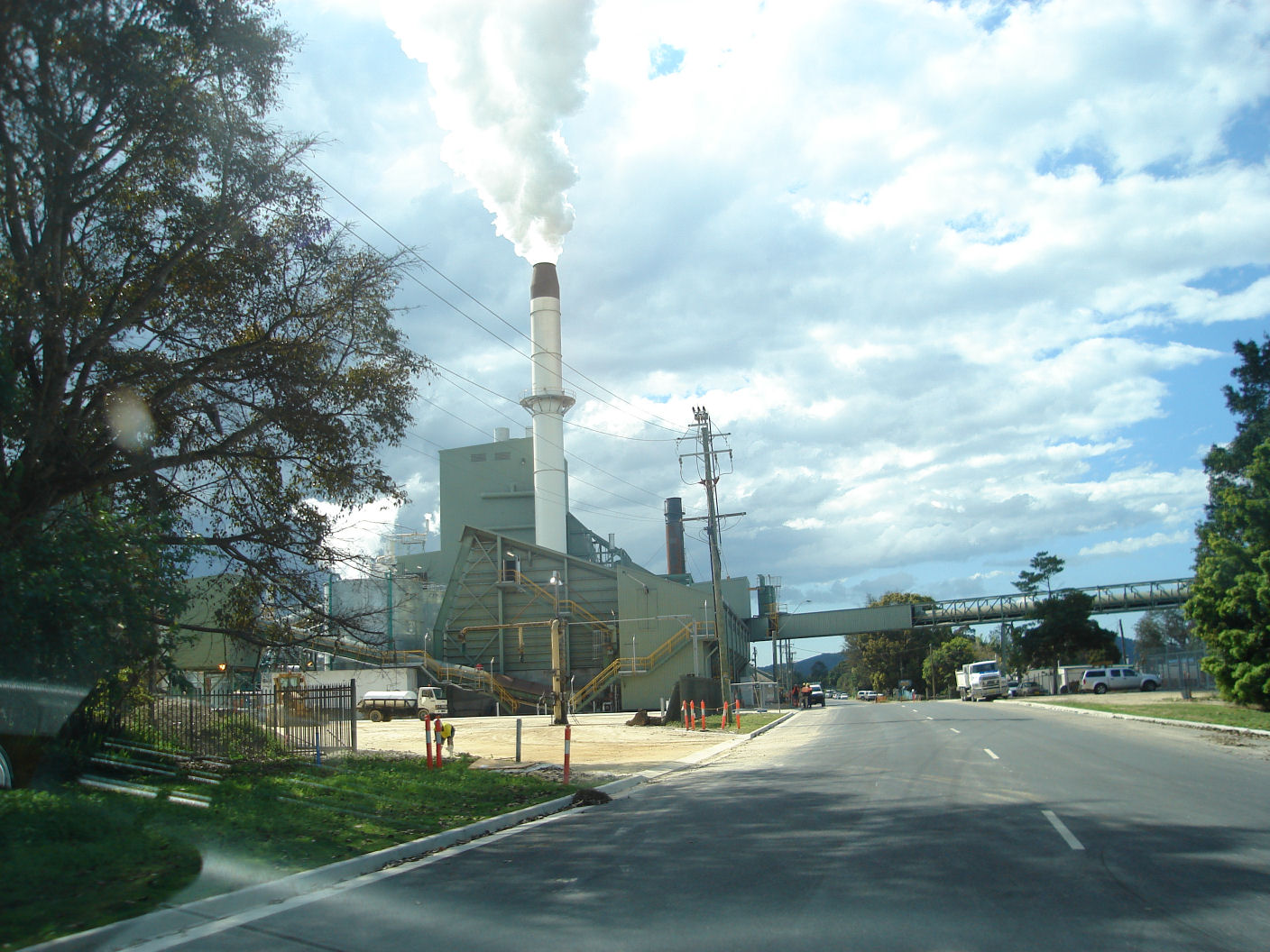
- Sugar mill at Condong

- Coordinates: 28°18′44″S 153°26′05″E
- Country: Australia
- State: New South Wales
- LGA: Tweed Shire
- Location: 4 km (2.5 mi) from Murwillumbah; 26 km (16 mi) from Tweed Heads; 54 km (34 mi) from Byron Bay; 800 km (500 mi) from Sydney

Government
  - State electorate: Tweed
  - Federal division: Richmond
- Elevation: 5 m (16 ft)

Population
  - Total: 298 (2011 census)
- Time zone: UTC+10 (AEST)
  - Summer (DST): UTC+11 (AEDT)
Localities around Condong
Dungay	Tumbulgum	Duranbah
Murwillumbah	Condong	Eviron
South Murwillumbah	Kielvale	Clothiers Creek

Condong is a village located in north-eastern New South Wales, Australia, in the Tweed Shire. It is 4.7 kilometres (2.9 mi) north-east of Murwillumbah.

One of the largest features of the village is a sugar cane crushing mill, first opened in 1880 by CSR Limited, which the village formed around. Since 1978 it has been operation by the NSW Sugar Milling Co-operative and sugar produced there is sold as Sunshine Sugar.

The Ngandowal and Minyungbal speaking people of the Bundjalung people are the traditional owners of the Tweed region, including Condong, and the surrounding areas.

== Origin of place name ==
The name Condong comes from the Bundjalung language and was taken from the name of a nearby hill. There are two major theories as to its origins, the first, recorded by linguist Margaret Sharpe, is that it means 'blue fig' and the other that it is taken from the chain word culgurrygum meaning 'big swamp'.

Alternatively JS Ryan believed that the origin of the place name was, by the early 1800s, already unknown to the people living there as it had come from an earlier group.

== Demographics ==
In the 2011 census, Condong recorded a population of 298 people, 50% female and 50% male.

The median age of the Condong population was 43 years, 6 years above the national median of 37.

88.4% of people living in Condong were born in Australia. The other top responses for country of birth were England 2%, Scotland 1%, India 1%, Spain 1%, New Zealand 1%.

93.3% of people spoke only English at home; the next most common languages were 1.3% Bandjalang, 1% Punjabi, 1% Indonesian, 1% Thai, 1% Spanish.
