= Hastings Point, New South Wales =

Town in New South Wales, Australia

Hastings Point
- Town
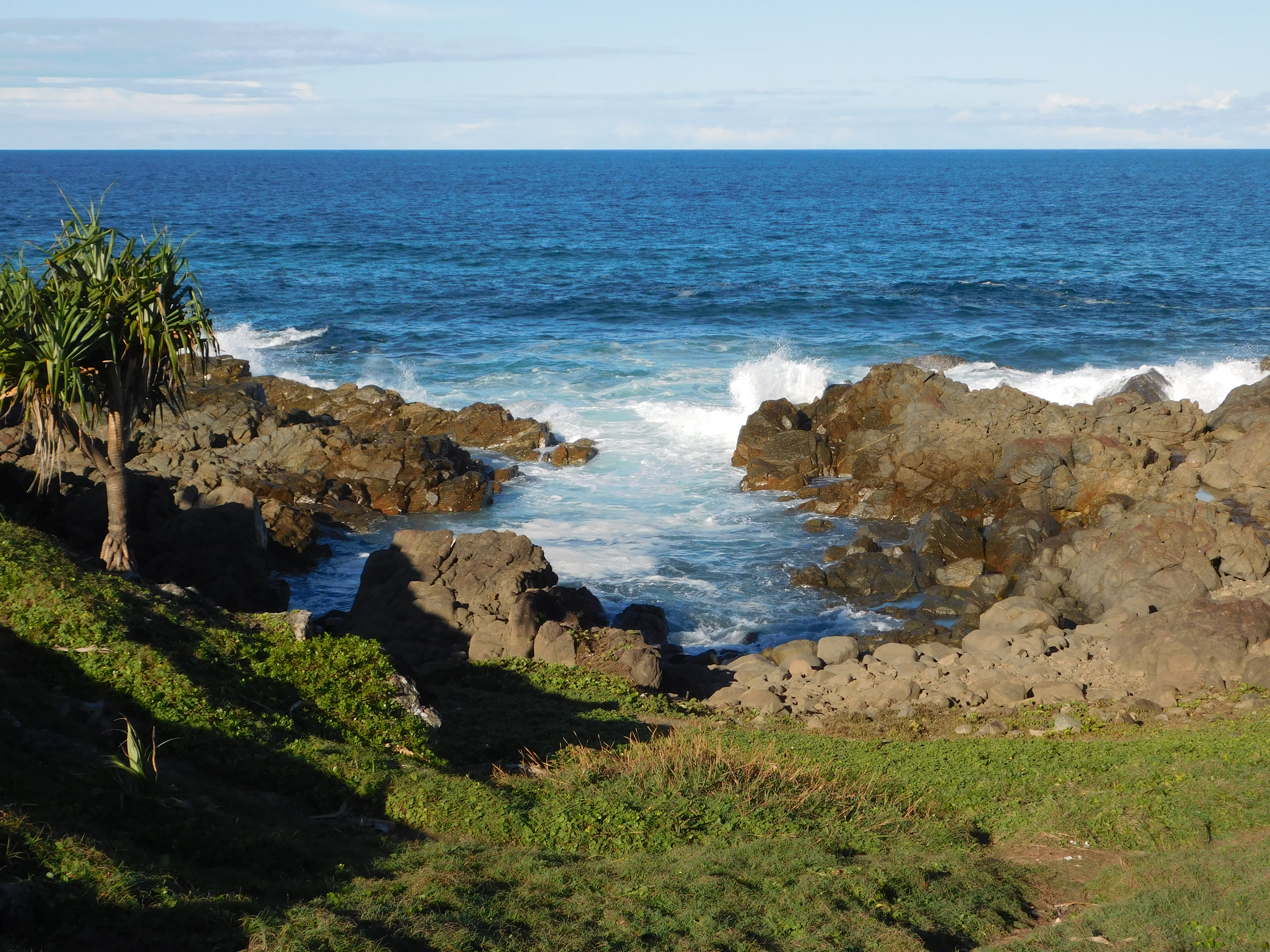

- Coordinates: 28°21′41″S 153°34′33″E
- Country: Australia
- State: New South Wales
- Region: Northern Rivers
- LGA: Tweed Shire
- Location: 124 km (77 mi) from Brisbane; 819 km (509 mi) from Sydney; 45 km (28 mi) from Byron Bay

Government
  - State electorate: Tweed
  - Federal division: Richmond

Population
  - Total: 582 (2011 census)
- Time zone: UTC+10 (AEST)
  - Summer (DST): UTC+11 (AEDT)
- Postcode: 2489
- County: Rous
Localities around Hastings Point
Round Mountain	Bongangar	South Pacific Ocean
Dum Dum	Hastings Point
Cudgera Creek	Pottsville	South Pacific Ocean

Hastings Point is a town in north-eastern New South Wales, Australia, in the Tweed Shire. From 1947 to 1962 aerial photography revealed foredunes up to 16 metres high in the area, which had been reduced to 6 to 9 metres high by 1977.

The Ngandowal and Minyungbal speaking people of the Bundjalung people are the traditional owners of the Tweed region, including Hasting Point, and the surrounding areas.

== Demographics ==
In the 2011 census, Hastings Point recorded a population of 582 people, 51.5% female and 48.5% male.

The median age of the Hastings Point population was 62 years, 25 years above the national median of 37.

77.8% of people living in Hastings Point were born in Australia. The other top responses for country of birth were England 8.1%, New Zealand 3.6%, Scotland 2.1%, Finland 0.7%, Germany 0.7%.

92.1% of people spoke only English at home; the next most common languages were 0.5% Finnish, 0.5% German, 0.5% Balinese, 0.5% Italian.
