= Kunghur, New South Wales =

Village in New South Wales, Australia

Kunghur
- Suburb
- Coordinates: 28°28′14″S 153°15′12″E
- Country: Australia
- State: New South Wales
- LGA: Tweed Shire

Government
  - State electorate: Lismore
  - Federal division: Richmond

Population
  - Total: 107 (2016 census)
- Postcode: 2484
- County: Rous, New South Wales
- Parish: Kunghur

Kunghur is a small rural village and suburb located in the Northern Rivers Region of New South Wales. The Tweed River runs through the middle of the suburb past the village. It sits close to the Queensland-New South Wales border.

== Demographics ==
As of the 2016 census, Kunghur had a population of 107, with a median age of 42. The population was made up of 57.4% men and 42.6% women. There were reportedly 44 private dwellings with an average of 2.8 people per household. There were 28 families living in Kunghur with an average of 0.6 children per family and an average of 1.8 children for households that have children. On average, there was 1.6 motor vehicles to each dwelling. The median monthly rent was $290 and the median monthly mortgage was $1,473. The median weekly household income was $924.

== History ==
The origin of the name “Kunghur” is believed to have evolved from the Aboriginal word “Kunghuh”, meaning to collect or gather. The most common variation of the story states that the name came about in 1863/4 when Joshua Bray and two Aboriginal boys tracked and mustered a group of missing cattle, in the bush, that they were leading down the South Arm route from Tunstall Station. According to the story, after the three mustered the cattle one of the boys exclaimed “We Kunghuh all now”.

This story is linked with an event of historical significance for the area. This was the first instance of cattle being imported into the Tweed via the inland route.

Kunghur was established when timber getters started harvesting the rainforests that eventually made way for dairy and beef cattle farmers which remain some of the primary industries to this day. These timber getters were most likely in search of red cedar trees, as is the case all over the Tweed Valley. Timber remained an important industry for Kunghur for many decades to follow.

Kunghur was opened for selection in 1904 and proclaimed a village in 1913.

The Kunghur Hall was built and opened in 1915. It was used to hold balls, dances, weddings, and other community functions.

Kunghur received a post office and telephone around the years 1917 and 1918.

A local school, Kunghur Public School, was erected in 1921 and ran until 1969.

In an article posted by the Tweed Daily in 1922, Kunghur reportedly had a store, butcher’s shop, and a bakery in addition to the aforementioned buildings and services.

In 1933, the Anglican St Paul's Church at Kunghur was established next door to the hall. The church is no longer in operation but still remains as a private residence.

The Kunghur Creek Mill was built in 1946 by Doug Cook, on property at the bottom of Blue Knob. A flying fox was established in 1949 to transport logs from the top of the Blue Knob range to the sawmill over 500 metres below. The flying fox reduced the six hour transport time to seven minutes. The flying fox stopped operating in 1955 but the remains can still be seen.

== Services ==
The Kunghur Community Pre-school has serviced the local area for over 50 years, residing in the Kunghur Hall.

The Hall was also, until recently, used as a polling booth for local and federal elections.

The Rural Fire Brigade serves the local area and also involves itself in community events. The Brigade has two category-seven light tankers.

== Sport ==
A variety of sports were played in and around Kunghur and by Kunghur teams. In 1917, a rifle club and range was established at Kunghur and in 1923, a tennis court was established for the pre-existing tennis club. A rugby league team existed that played in the local area along with a cricket team that played against small local teams in the area such as Uki, Chowan Creek, and Doon Doon. These local games were played on a pitch at Cram’s Farm, Doon Doon. Kunghur had been known to hold horse racing and mixed sports events, such as the Kunghur Bachelor’s Club, Goonebah Parents and Citizens' Association, and the Returned Soldiers and Sailors' Amusement Club.
