= Bogangar =

Town on Tweed Coast, New South Wales, Australia

Cabarita
- Suburb
- Coordinates: 28.3318°S 153.5596°E
- Country: Australia
- State: New South Wales
- LGA: Tweed Shire
- Location: 119 km (74 mi) SSE of Brisbane; 21 km (13 mi) S of Tweed Heads; 48 km (30 mi) N of Byron Bay; 811 km (504 mi) N of Sydney

Government
  - State electorate: Electoral district of Tweed
  - Federal division: Division of Richmond
- Elevation: 7 m (23 ft)

Population
  - Total: 3,313 (SAL 2021)
Suburbs around Cabarita
Kings Forest	Cabarita Beach	Pacific Ocean
Tanglewood	Cabarita	Pacific Ocean
Round Mountain	Hastings Point	Pacific Ocean

Bogangar (/boʊɡæŋɡər/) is a town in the Tweed Shire located in north-eastern New South Wales, Australia, and includes Cudgen Lake, Norries Headland and the locality of Cabarita Beach on the east. Locally, the names Bogangar and Cabarita Beach are interchangeable, with more residents choosing to use the latter. In the 2021 Census, Bogangar had a population of 3,313.

The Ngandowal and Minyungbal speaking people of the Bundjalung people are the traditional owners of the Tweed region, including Banora Point, and the surrounding areas.

== History ==
The namesake for Bogangar is uncertain, though several suggestions have been put forward. One interpretation is that it takes its origin from an Aboriginal term meaning literally "a place of many pippies". Another interpretation is that it takes its name from the Bandjalang-Yugambeh dialect chain word `bobingah' meaning a highland. It has also been suggested that it is from a Bandjalang-Yugambeh word for 'grass trees along a ridge', perhaps in reference to the promontory presently known as Norries Headland.

Bogangar Public School was opened on 16 February 2004.

== See also ==
- Cabarita Beach, New South Wales
- Northern Rivers
