= Bray Park, New South Wales =

Town in New South Wales, Australia

Bray Park
- Suburb
- Interactive map of Bray Park
- Coordinates: 28°20′25″S 153°22′32″E
- Country: Australia
- State: New South Wales
- City: Murwillumbah
- LGA: Tweed Shire

Government
  - State electorate: Tweed
  - Federal division: Richmond

Population
  - Total: 831 (2011 census)
- Time zone: UTC+10 (AEST)
  - Summer (DST): UTC+11 (AEDT)
- Postcode: 2484

Bray Park is a suburb of Murwillumbah located in north-eastern New South Wales, Australia, in the Tweed Shire.

The Ngandowal and Minyungbal speaking people of the Bundjalung people are the traditional owners of Bray Park and its surrounding areas. The following clans Goodjinburra, Tul-gi-gin and Moorung-Moobah are recognised as being of particular significance.

== Origin of place name ==
It is named after Joshua Bray, an early European settler in the region who played an important role in the early colonisation of the Tweed Valley.

== Demographics ==
In the 2011 census, Bray Park recorded a population of 831 people, 52.6% female and 47.4% male.

The median age of the Bray Park population was 40 years, 3 years above the national median of 37.

84.6% of people living in Bray Park were born in Australia. The other top responses for country of birth were New Zealand 2.3%, England 1.8%, India 0.7%, France 0.4%, China 0.4%.

90.5% of people spoke only English at home; the next most common languages were 0.7% Punjabi, 0.7% Bisaya, 0.6% Cantonese, 0.5% French, 0.4% Spanish.
