= Kings Forest, New South Wales =

Settlement in New South Wales, Australia

Kings Forest
- Town
- Coordinates: 28.2889°S 153.5493°E
- Country: Australia
- State: New South Wales
- Region: Northern Rivers
- LGA: Tweed Shire
- Location: 127 km (79 mi) S of Brisbane; 29 km (18 mi) S of Tweed Heads; 60 km (37 mi) N of Byron Bay; 820 km (510 mi) N of Sydney

Government
  - State electorate: Tweed
  - Federal division: Richmond
- Elevation: 4 m (13 ft)

Population
  - Total: 40 (SAL 2021)
- Time zone: UTC+10 (AEST)
  - Summer (DST): UTC+11 (AEDT)
- Postcode: 2487
- County: Rous
Localities around Kings Forest
Stotts Creek	Cudgen	Kingscliff
Duranbah	Kings Forest	Cabarita Beach
Tanglewood	Tanglewood	Bogangar

Kings Forest is a small settlement, which will become a master-planned community, located on the far north coast of New South Wales, Australia, in the Tweed Shire. It was acquired by Stockland in August 2025.

The Ngandowal and Minyungbal speaking people of the Bundjalung people are the traditional owners of the Tweed region, including Kings Forest, and the surrounding areas.

== Demographics ==
Due to the small population for this area, In the 2016 Census, there were 35 people in Kings Forest. Of these, 48.6% were male and 51.4% were female. The median age was 44 years and the average number of people per household was 2.6.
