= Brays Creek, New South Wales =

Town in Australia

Brays Creek
- Town
- Coordinates: 28°24′24″S 153°11′34″E
- Country: Australia
- State: New South Wales
- Region: NSW
- LGA: Tweed Shire
- Location: 163 km (101 mi) S of Brisbane; 789 km (490 mi) N of Sydney

Government
  - State electorate: Tweed
  - Federal division: Richmond

Population
  - Total: 71 (2016 census)
- Time zone: UTC+10 (AEST)
  - Summer (DST): UTC+11 (AEDT)
- Postcode: 2484
- County: Australia

Brays Creek is a town in the Tweed Shire, in north-eastern New South Wales, Australia. At the 2016 census, it had a population of 71. Brays Creek has a creek running through it named Brays Creek after itself.

The Ngandowal and Minyungbal speaking people of the Bundjalung people are the traditional owners of the Tweed region, including Brays Creek, and the surrounding areas.
