= Kynnumboon, New South Wales =

Kynnumboon
- Town
- Coordinates: 28°18′53″S 153°23′2″E
- Country: Australia
- State: New South Wales
- LGA: Tweed Shire

Government
  - State electorate: Tweed
  - Federal division: Richmond

Population
  - Total: 109 (2021 census)
- Postcode: 2484

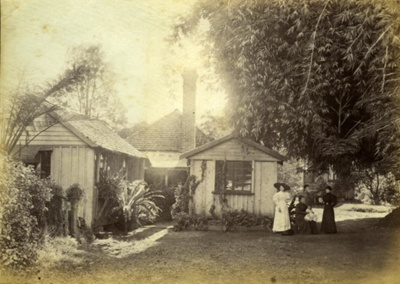
The Kynnumboon Homestead, home of the Bray family, c1890

Kynnumboon is a locality in the Tweed Shire of New South Wales, Australia. It had a population of 109 as of the 2021 census.

The Ngandowal and Minyungbal speaking people of the Bundjalung people are the traditional owners of Kynnumboon and its surrounding areas.

== Origin of place name and history ==
The name for this place is likely derived from the Bundjalung language a and is either taken from the word kinnonboon (a type of root) or kingimbon (rock). Alternatively it may have been taken from the Yugambeh dialect word guyahnambuhn which means 'the place of possums'.

One of the first European residents of this area, who built their home there, was Joshua Bray who was an early colonist of the region. It is Bray who gave this name to his home and it became the name for the locality. In 1866 he became the first post master in the region and the post office operated from his home their and was known as 'Wollumben Post Office'.

== Demographics ==
As of the 2021 Australian census, 109 people resided in Kynnumboon, down from 134 in the 2016 census. The median age of persons in Kynnumboon was 54 years. There were more males than females, with 51.8% of the population male and 48.2% female. The average household size was 2.5 people per household.
