= Pumpenbil, New South Wales =

Town in New South Wales, Australia

Pumpenbil
- Town
- Coordinates: 28°22′52″S 153°09′46″E
- Country: Australia
- State: New South Wales
- LGA: Tweed Shire

Government
  - State electorate: Tweed
  - Federal division: Richmond

Population
  - Total: 441 (2011 census)
- Time zone: UTC+10 (AEST)
  - Summer (DST): UTC+11 (AEDT)
- Postcode: 2484

Pumpenbil is a town in north-eastern New South Wales, Australia, in the Tweed Shire.

The Ngandowal and Minyungbal speaking people of the Bundjalung people are the traditional owners of the Tweed region, including Pumpenbil, and the surrounding areas.

== Demographics ==
In the 2011 census, Pumpenbil recorded a population of 441 people, 48.5% female and 51.5% male.

The median age of the Pumpenbil population was 49 years, 12 years above the national median of 37.

79.5% of people living in Pumpenbil were born in Australia. The other top responses for country of birth were England 4.5%, New Zealand 1.8%, Scotland 1.6%, Zimbabwe 0.9%, Belgium 0.7%, 9.5% other countries.

93.7% of people spoke only English at home; the next most common language was French with 0.9%.

The most commonly reported religious affiliation was "no religion" 28.9%, followed by Anglican 17.7%, and Catholic 15.0%.
