= Cabarita Beach, New South Wales =

Town in New South Wales, Australia

Cabarita Beach
- Town
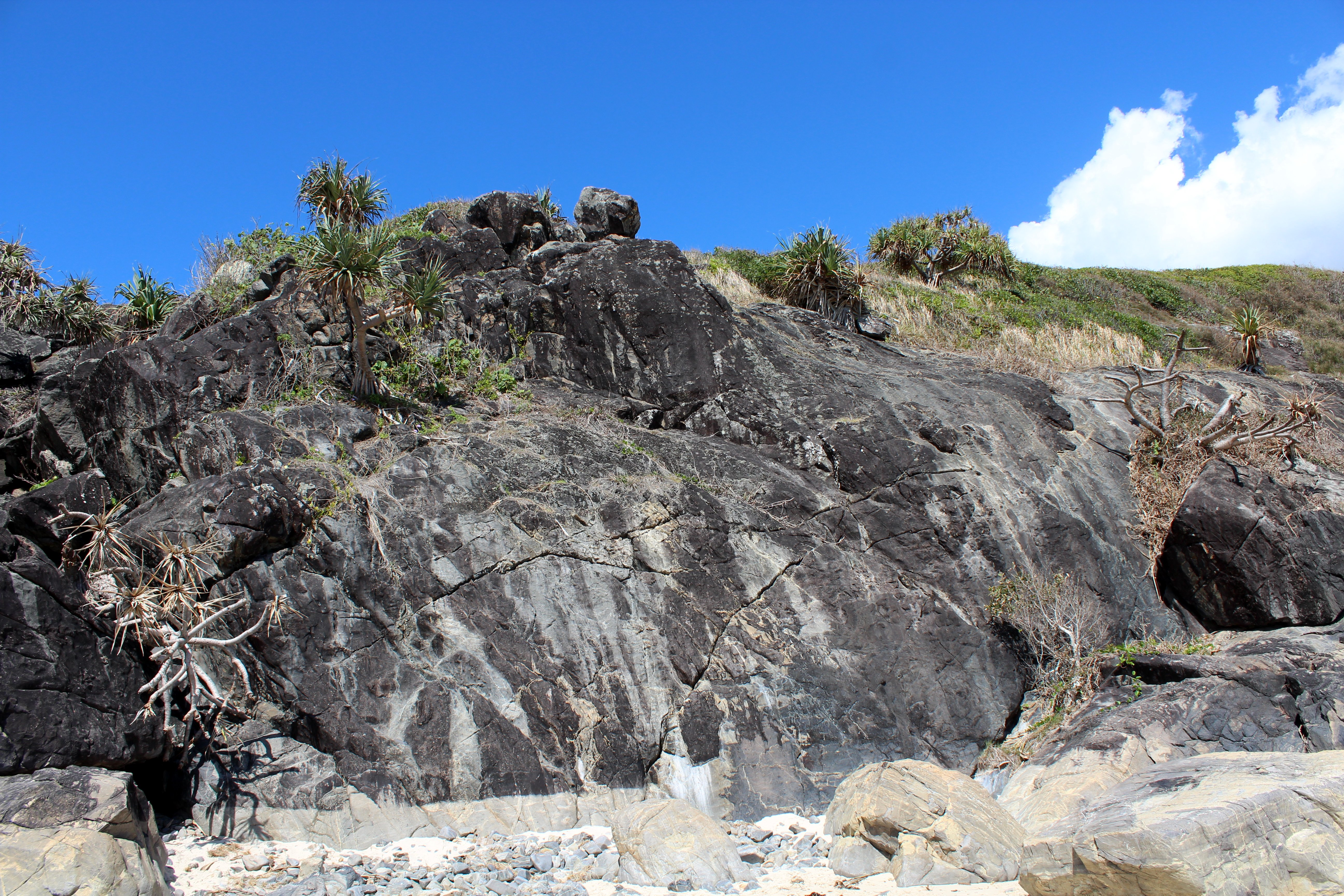
- Rocky cliffs at Cabarita Beach

- Coordinates: 28.3293°S 153.56979°E
- Country: Australia
- State: New South Wales
- Region: Northern Rivers
- LGA: Tweed Shire
- Location: 118 km (73 mi) SSE of Brisbane; 20 km (12 mi) S of Tweed Heads; 49 km (30 mi) N of Byron Bay; 812 km (505 mi) N of Sydney

Government
  - State electorate: Electoral district of Tweed
  - Federal division: Division of Richmond

Area
  - Total: 1.4 km^{2} (0.54 sq mi)
- Elevation: 8 m (26 ft)

Population
  - Total: 101 (SAL 2021)
Localities around Cabarita Beach
| Kings Forest | Casuarina | Pacific Ocean |
| Tanglewood | Cabarita Beach | Pacific Ocean |
| Round Mountain | Bogangar | Pacific Ocean |

Cabarita Beach is a town in northeastern New South Wales which occupies a thin strip of beach-side land along the Coral Sea coast, east of Tweed Coast Road, in the Tweed Shire town of Bogangar. Locally, the names Cabarita Beach and Bogangar are interchangeable; either may be used when referring to the whole settlement, with more people using the former. Hastings Point lies close to Cabarita Beach to the south and Casuarina to the north. At the 2016 census Cabarita Beach had a population of 103, Bogangar 3060. Cabarita Beach is located within the Tweed Shire Local Government Authority.

The beach itself, as well as the nearby Norries Headland, are popular tourist attractions. The surfing spot to the north of the headland is also very popular.

The first major development in Cabarita Beach was the original Cabarita Hotel, opened on 17 December 1960. The original Cabarita Hotel has since been replaced by a modern, glass, chrome, and concrete structure.

== See also ==
- Bogangar
- Northern Rivers
