= Eungella, New South Wales =

Town in New South Wales, Australia

Eungella
- Town
- Coordinates: 28.351°S 153.305°E
- Country: Australia
- State: New South Wales
- LGA: Tweed Shire

Government
  - State electorate: Tweed
  - Federal division: Richmond

Population
  - Total: 285 (2011 census)
- Time zone: UTC+10 (AEST)
  - Summer (DST): UTC+11 (AEDT)
- Postcode: 2484

Eungella is a town in north-eastern New South Wales, Australia, in the Tweed Shire. It is located on the Oxley River and on the Tyalgum Road from Murwillumbah to Tyalgum.

The Ngandowal and Minyungbal speaking people of the Bundjalung people are the traditional owners of the Tweed region, including Eungella, and the surrounding areas.

== Demographics ==
In the 2011 census, Eungella recorded a population of 285 people, 48.4% female and 51.6% male.

The median age of the Eungella population was 40 years, 3 years above the national median of 37.

81.8% of people living in Eungella were born in Australia. The other top responses for country of birth were New Zealand 3.8%, England 3.5%, Germany 1%, Croatia 1%, Myanmar (Burma) 1%.

93.4% of people spoke only English at home; the next most common languages were 1% Tamil, 1% Croatian, 1% French, 1% Bengali, 1% Greek.
