= Commissioners Creek, New South Wales =

Commissioners Creek New South Wales
- Coordinates: 28°29′54″S 153°19′55″E
- Population: 38 (2021 census)
- Postcode(s): 2484
- LGA(s): Tweed Shire
- State electorate(s): Tweed
- Federal division(s): Richmond

Commissioners Creek is a locality in the Tweed Shire of New South Wales, Australia. It had a population of 38 as of the 2021 census.

== Demographics ==
As of the 2021 Australian census, 38 people resided in Commissioners Creek, down from 65 in the 2016 census. The median age of persons in Commissioners Creek was 39 years. There were more males than females, with 56.1% of the population male and 43.9% female. The average household size was 2.3 people per household.
