= Upper Burringbar =

Town in New South Wales, Australia

Coordinates: 28°27′S 153°27′E

- Town
- Country: Australia
- State: New South Wales
- LGA: Tweed Shire

Government
  - State electorate: Tweed
  - Federal division: Richmond

Population
  - Total: 283 (2011 census)
- Time zone: UTC+10 (AEST)
  - Summer (DST): UTC+11 (AEDT)
- Postcode: 2483

Upper Burringbar is a town in north-eastern New South Wales, Australia, in the Tweed Shire.

The Ngandowal and Minyungbal speaking people of the Bundjalung people are the traditional owners of the Tweed region, including Upper Burringbar, and the surrounding areas.

== Demographics ==
In the 2011 census, Upper Burringbar recorded a population of 283 people, 42% female and 58% male.

The median age of the Upper Burringbar population was 43 years, 6 years above the national median of 37.

77.3% of people living in Upper Burringbar were born in Australia. The other top responses for country of birth were England 5%, Japan 2.1%, Italy 1.4%, New Zealand 1.4%, Switzerland 1.1%, 11.9% other countries.

85.5% of people spoke only English at home; the next most common languages were 2.1% Japanese, 1.1% Welsh, 1.1% Thai, 4.3% other languages.
