= Upper Crystal Creek =

Town in New South Wales, Australia

- Town
- Coordinates: 28°16′30″S 153°18′12″E
- Country: Australia
- State: New South Wales
- LGA: Tweed Shire

Government
  - State electorate: Tweed
  - Federal division: Richmond

Population
  - Total: 187 (2011 census)
- Time zone: UTC+10 (AEST)
  - Summer (DST): UTC+11 (AEDT)
- Postcode: 2484

Upper Crystal Creek is a town in north-eastern New South Wales, Australia, in the Tweed Shire.

The Ngandowal and Minyungbal speaking people of the Bundjalung people are the traditional owners of the Tweed region, including Upper Crystal Creek, and the surrounding areas.

== Demographics ==
In the 2011 census, Upper Crystal Creek recorded a population of 187 people, 51.9% female and 48.1% male.

The median age of the Upper Crystal Creek population was 46 years, 9 years above the national median of 37.

78.1% of people living in Upper Crystal Creek were born in Australia. The other top responses for country of birth were England 5.3%, Germany 3.2%, Zimbabwe 2.1%, New Zealand 2.1%, Italy 1.6%, 12.2% other countries.

88.2% of people spoke only English at home; the next most common languages were 2.1% Finnish, 1.6% German, 1.6% French, 1.6% Italian, 1.6% Spanish, 6.9% other languages.
