= Stokers Siding, New South Wales =

Town in New South Wales, Australia

Coordinates: 28°24′S 153°24′E

Stokers Siding
- Town
- Country: Australia
- State: New South Wales
- LGA: Tweed Shire

Government
  - State electorate: Tweed
  - Federal division: Richmond

Population
  - Total: 663 (2016 census)
- Time zone: UTC+10 (AEST)
  - Summer (DST): UTC+11 (AEDT)
- Postcode: 2484

Stokers Siding is a village located in the Tweed Shire in north-eastern New South Wales, Australia, near the Burringbar Range and Mount Warning. It has been described as an "idyllic village" and the Northern Rivers Rail Trail passes through it.

The Ngandowal and Minyungbal speaking people of the Bundjalung people are the traditional owners of the Tweed region, including Stokers Siding, and the surrounding areas.

== Demographics ==
In the 2016 census, there were 663 people in Stokers Siding, 52.2% male and 47.8% female. The median age was 46 years, 8 years above the state and national median. 78.2% of the population were born in Australia; the other top country of birth responses were England 3.5%, New Zealand 2.7%, Germany 1.1% and Papua New Guinea and India both 0.5%. 85.6% of people only spoke English at home; other languages spoken at home included Punjabi 2.3%, Spanish 1.1%, Finnish 0.6% and German and Greek both 0.5%.

== History ==
The original inhabitants of the area were the Bundjalung people. From 1861 to 1880, the Robertson Land Acts opened up large areas of NSW to farming, and in 1882 Joseph Stoker purchased 600 acres in what was then known as Dunbible Creek. The village developed with the coming of the train line to Murwillumbah and was originally known as Dunbible Siding, although this was eventually changed to Stokers Siding. In 1974, the NSW Government, as part of budget cuts, closed the railway station, with trains going directly to Murwillumbah. In recent years, the village has been home to a thriving arts community.
