= Byangum =

Town in New South Wales, Australia

- Town
- Coordinates: 28°21′23″S 153°21′39″E
- Country: Australia
- State: New South Wales
- LGA: Tweed Shire

Government
  - State electorate: Tweed
  - Federal division: Richmond

Population
  - Total: 335 (2011 census)
- Time zone: UTC+10 (AEST)
  - Summer (DST): UTC+11 (AEDT)
- Postcode: 2484

Byangum is a town in north-eastern New South Wales, Australia, in the Tweed Shire. It is a suburb of Murwillumbah and it sits 5 kilometres (3.1 mi) south west.

The Ngandowal and Minyungbal speaking people of the Bundjalung people are the traditional owners of Byangum and the surrounding area. The following clans Goodjinburra, Tul-gi-gin and Moorung-Moobah are recognised as being of particular significance.

== Origin of place name ==
The name Byangum is taken from the Bundjalung language and there a number of theories as to where it originated with some believing it is a corruption of the word bean-gum, meaning 'farther place' and others that it is taken from buyaugun which is 'a land curlew'. Other possible meanings including 'snail' and/or 'edible snail'.

== Demographics ==
In the 2011 census, Byangum recorded a population of 335 people, 46.6% female and 53.4% male.

The median age of the Byangum population was 50 years, 13 years above the national median of 37.

75.8% of people living in Byangum were born in Australia. The other top responses for country of birth were New Zealand 4.5%, England 3.6%, Germany 1.8%, Philippines 1.2%, Indonesia 1.2%.
