= Nobbys Creek, New South Wales =

Town in New South Wales, Australia

Coordinates: 28°18′S 153°20′E

Nobbys Creek
- Town
- Country: Australia
- State: New South Wales
- LGA: Tweed Shire

Government
  - State electorate: Tweed
  - Federal division: Richmond

Population
  - Total: 274 (2011 census)
- Time zone: UTC+10 (AEST)
  - Summer (DST): UTC+11 (AEDT)
- Postcode: 2486

Nobbys Creek is a town in north-eastern New South Wales, Australia, in the Tweed Shire.

The Ngandowal and Minyungbal speaking people of the Bundjalung people are the traditional owners of the Tweed region, including Nobbys Creek, and the surrounding areas.

== Demographics ==
In the 2011 census, Nobbys Creek recorded a population of 274 people, 48.9% female and 51.1% male.

The median age of the Nobbys Creek population was 46 years, 9 years above the national median of 37.

78.2% of people living in Nobbys Creek were born in Australia. The other top responses for country of birth were England 2.5%, France 1.8%, Egypt 1.8%, New Zealand 1.8%, South Africa 1.5%, 9.4% other countries.

87% of people spoke only English at home; the next most common languages were 1.8% Greek, 1.4% German, 1.1% Punjabi, 1.1% Danish, 5.4% other languages.
