= Palmvale, New South Wales =

Palmvale New South Wales
- Coordinates: 28°22′29″S 153°29′14″E
- Population: 95 (2021 census)
- Postcode(s): 2484
- LGA(s): Tweed Shire
- State electorate(s): Tweed
- Federal division(s): Richmond

Palmvale is a locality in the Tweed Shire of New South Wales, Australia. It had a population of 95 as of the 2021 census.

== Demographics ==
As of the 2021 Australian census, 95 people resided in Palmvale, up from 83 in the 2016 census. The median age of persons in Palmvale was 39 years. There were more males than females, with 57.6% of the population male and 42.4% female. The average household size was 3.1 people per household.
