= Crystal Creek, New South Wales =

Town in New South Wales, Australia

Crystal Creek
- Town
- Coordinates: 28.309°S 153.316°E
- Country: Australia
- State: New South Wales
- LGA: Tweed Shire

Government
  - State electorate: Tweed
  - Federal division: Richmond

Population
  - Total: 259 (2016 census)
- Time zone: UTC+10 (AEST)
  - Summer (DST): UTC+11 (AEDT)
- Postcode: 2484

Crystal Creek is a town in north-eastern New South Wales, Australia, in the Tweed Shire.

The Ngandowal and Minyungbal speaking people of the Bundjalung people are the traditional owners of the Tweed region, including Crystal Creek, and the surrounding areas.

== Demographics ==
In the 2016 census, Crystal Creek recorded a population of 259 people, a decrease from the 395 people recorded in 2011. 51.9% of residents are female and 48.1% male.

The median age of the Crystal Creek population was 44 years, six years above the national median of 38.

84.3% of people living in Crystal Creek were born in Australia. The other top responses for country of birth were Germany 2.7%, Netherlands 1.6%, Italy 1.2%, United Arab Emirates 1.2% and India 1.2%.

89.3% of people spoke only English at home; the only other response for language spoken at home was German 3.1%.
