= Glengarrie, New South Wales =

Glengarrie New South Wales
- Coordinates: 28°13′52″S 153°24′5″E
- Population: 102 (2021 census)
- Postcode(s): 2486
- LGA(s): Tweed Shire
- State electorate(s): Tweed
- Federal division(s): Richmond

Glengarrie is a locality in the Tweed Shire of New South Wales, Australia. It had a population of 102 as of the 2021 census.
