= Cudgera Creek =

Town in New South Wales, Australia

Coordinates: 28°23′S 153°31′E

- Town
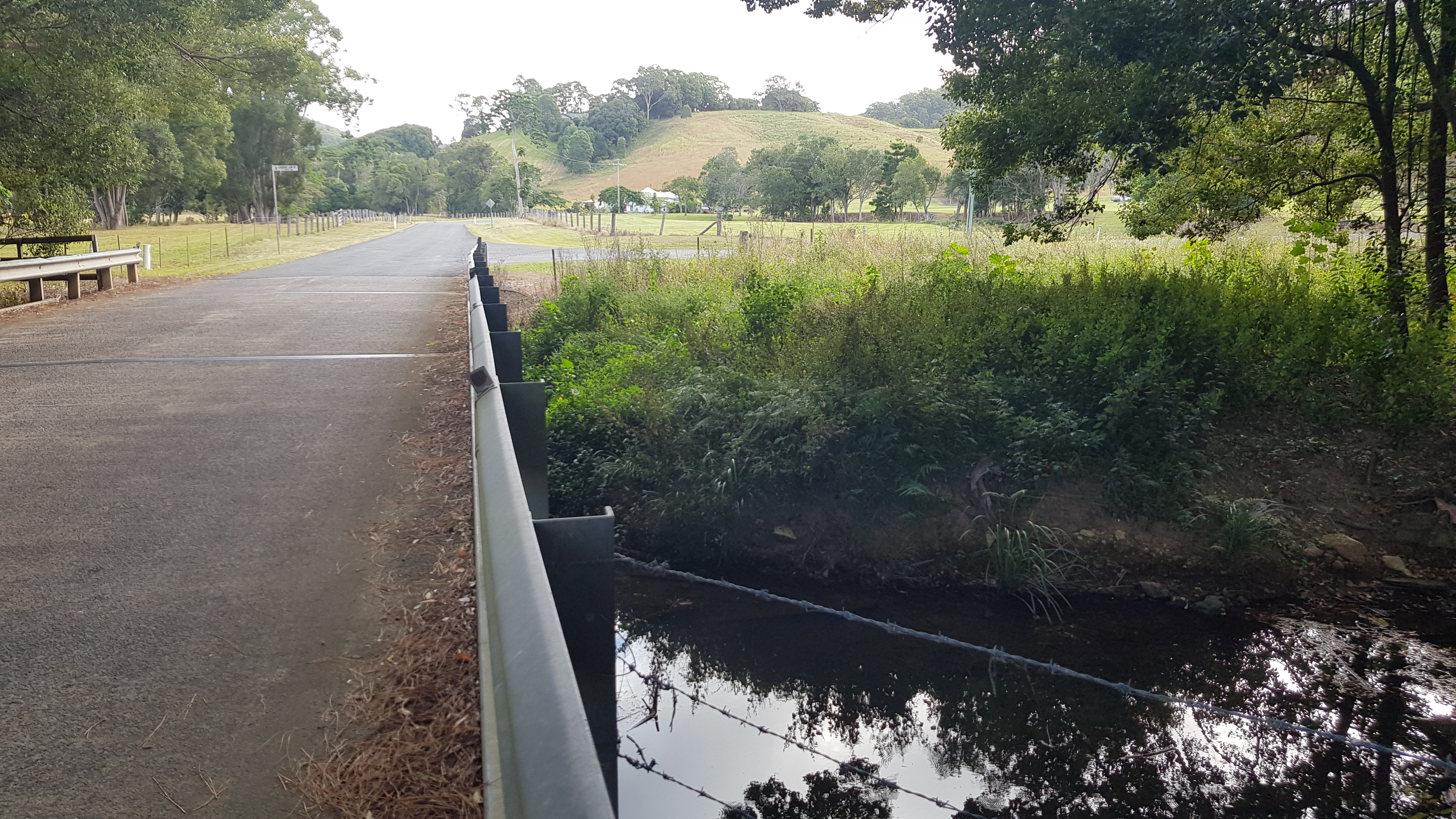
- Cudgera Creek, 2023
- Country: Australia
- State: New South Wales
- LGA: Tweed Shire

Government
  - State electorate: Tweed
  - Federal division: Richmond

Population
  - Total: 386 (2011 census)
- Time zone: UTC+10 (AEST)
  - Summer (DST): UTC+11 (AEDT)
- Postcode: 2484

Cudgera Creek is a town in north-eastern New South Wales, Australia, in the Tweed Shire.

The Ngandowal and Minyungbal speaking people of the Bundjalung people are the traditional owners of the Tweed region, including Cudgera Creek, and the surrounding areas.

== Origin of place name ==
The name Cudgera Creek comes from the Yugambeh–Bundjalung language and is taken from the word cudgera which is a type of tree.

== Demographics ==
In the 2011 census, Cudgera Creek recorded a population of 386 people, 53.1% female and 46.9% male.

The median age of the Cudgera Creek population was 36 years, 1 year below the national median of 37.

87.6% of people living in Cudgera Creek were born in Australia. The other top responses for country of birth were New Zealand 1.8%, England 1.6%, Italy 1%, Thailand 1%, Sweden 0.8%.

94.8% of people spoke only English at home; the next most common language was 0.8% Vietnamese.
