= Tomewin, New South Wales =

Rural locality in New South Wales, Australia

Tomewin
- Town
- Coordinates: 28°15′14″S 153°22′15″E
- Country: Australia
- State: New South Wales
- LGA: Tweed Shire

Government
  - State electorate: Tweed
  - Federal division: Richmond

Population
  - Total: 98 (2021 census)
- Postcode: 2484

Tomewin is a small rural locality located in the Northern Rivers Region of New South Wales.
