= Bungalora, New South Wales =

Bungalora New South Wales
- Coordinates: 28°14′49″S 153°28′34″E
- Population: 69 (2016 census)
- Postcode(s): 2486
- LGA(s): Tweed Shire
- State electorate(s): Tweed
- Federal division(s): Richmond

Bungalora is a small town located in the Northern Rivers Region of New South Wales. It had a population of 69 in the 2016 census.
