= Duroby, New South Wales =

Duroby New South Wales
- Coordinates: 28°14′34″S 153°27′34″E
- Population: 74 (2021 census)
- Postcode(s): 2486
- LGA(s): Tweed Shire
- State electorate(s): Tweed
- Federal division(s): Richmond

Duroby is a locality in the Tweed Shire of New South Wales, Australia. It had a population of 74 as of the 2021 census.
