= Reserve Creek =

Town in New South Wales, Australia

Coordinates: 28°21′S 153°31′E

- Town
- Country: Australia
- State: New South Wales
- LGA: Tweed Shire

Government
  - State electorate: Tweed
  - Federal division: Richmond

Population
  - Total: 213 (2011 census)
- Time zone: UTC+10 (AEST)
  - Summer (DST): UTC+11 (AEDT)
- Postcode: 2484

Reserve Creek is a town in north-eastern New South Wales, Australia, in the Tweed Shire.

The Ngandowal and Minyungbal speaking people of the Bundjalung people are the traditional owners of the Tweed region, including Reserve Creek, and the surrounding areas.

== Demographics ==
In the 2011 census the population of Reserve Creek was 213, 48.4% female and 51.6% male.

The median age of the Reserve Creek population was 45 years of age, 8 years above the Australian median.

83.9% of people living in Reserve Creek were born in Australia. The other top responses for country of birth were India 2.8%, New Zealand 2.4%, England 1.4%, Italy 1.4%, Netherlands 1.4% and 9.4% other countries.

91.1% of people spoke only English at home; the next most common languages were 2.8% Punjabi, 1.4% Italian and 4.2% other languages.
