= Urliup, New South Wales =

Urliup New South Wales
- Coordinates: 28°15′9″S 153°24′22″E
- Population: 193 (2021 census)
- Postcode(s): 2484
- LGA(s): Tweed Shire
- State electorate(s): Tweed
- Federal division(s): Richmond

Urliup is a locality in the Tweed Shire of New South Wales, Australia. It had a population of 193 as of the 2021 census.
