= Cudgen =

Town in New South Wales, Australia

- Town
- Coordinates: 28°17′0″S 153°33′0″E
- Country: Australia
- State: New South Wales
- Region: NSW
- LGA: Tweed Shire
- Location: 113 km (70 mi) S of Brisbane; 14 km (8.7 mi) S of Tweed Heads; 58 km (36 mi) N of Byron Bay; 823 km (511 mi) N of Sydney

Government
  - State electorate: Tweed
  - Federal division: Richmond
- Elevation: 32 m (105 ft)

Population
  - Total: 857 (2016 census)
- Time zone: UTC+10 (AEST)
  - Summer (DST): UTC+11 (AEDT)
- Postcode: 2487
- County: Australia
Localities around Cudgen
Terranora	Chinderah	Kingscliff
Stotts Creek	Cudgen	Kingscliff
Duranbah	Kings Forest	Casuarina

Cudgen (/kʌdʒən/) is a town in north-eastern New South Wales, Australia. It sits within the Tweed Shire local government area and it is 14 kilometres (8.7 mi) from the regional centre of Tweed Heads.

It is built on the land of the Coodjingburra clan of the Minyungbal people of the Yugambeh nation. The name Cudgen is derived from the Yugambe language word kidhin which means 'red clay'.

== Demographics ==
In the 2016 Census, Cudgen recorded a population of 857 people, 50% female and 50% male.

The median age of the Cudgen population was 39 years, 2 years above the national median of 37.

85.4% of people living in Cudgen were born in Australia. The other top responses for country of birth were England 3.1%, New Zealand 1.5%, Thailand 0.6%, Scotland 0.5%, Japan 0.5%.

94.1% of people spoke only English at home; the next most common languages were 0.9% Japanese, 0.4% Turkish, 0.4% Italian, 0.4% Thai, 0.4% Czech.

== Sport and recreation ==
The Cudgen Hornets is the local rugby league club that competes in the Northern Rivers Regional Rugby League competition.
