= Wardrop Valley, New South Wales =

Wardrop Valley New South Wales
- Coordinates: 28°21′46″S 153°27′16″E
- Population: 80 (2021 census)
- Postcode(s): 2484
- LGA(s): Tweed Shire
- State electorate(s): Tweed
- Federal division(s): Richmond

Wardrop Valley is a locality in the Tweed Shire of New South Wales, Australia. It had a population of 80 as of the 2021 census.

== Demographics ==
As of the 2021 Australian census, 80 people resided in Wardrop Valley, down from 89 in the 2016 census. The median age of persons in Wardrop Valley was 39 years. There were more males than females, with 57.3% of the population male and 42.7% female. The average household size was 2.5 people per household.
