= Cedar Creek, New South Wales (Tweed) =

Town in New South Wales, Australia

Cedar Creek
- Town
- Coordinates: 28°25′11″S 153°15′33″E
- Country: Australia
- State: New South Wales
- LGA: Tweed Shire
- Location: 56 km (35 mi) SW of Tweed Heads; 791 km (492 mi) N of Sydney

Government
  - State electorate: Lismore
  - Federal division: Richmond

Population
  - Total: 20 (2016 census)
- Time zone: UTC+10 (AEST)
  - Summer (DST): UTC+11 (AEDT)
- Postcode: 2484

Cedar Creek is a small village located in the Tweed Shire in the Northern Rivers region of New South Wales, Australia.

The Ngandowal and Minyungbal speaking people of the Bundjalung people are the traditional owners of the Tweed region, including Cedar Creek, and the surrounding areas.
