= Wooyung =

Town in New South Wales, Australia

- Town
- Coordinates: 28°27′20″S 153°32′34″E
- Country: Australia
- State: New South Wales
- LGA: Byron Shire Tweed Shire

Government
  - State electorate: Ballina
  - Federal division: Richmond

Population
  - Total: 139 (2021 census)
- Postcode: 2483

Wooyung is a small town located in the Northern Rivers Region of New South Wales.

The most recent census indicated a population of 139, with a median age of 49. Wooyung is thought to either mean 'slow' in the Githabul and Yugambeh dialects of the Bundjalung language; this is said to reflect the natural tranquillity of the area. Alternatively it is thought to be named for the grass that is present there or 'place of long grass'.

== History ==
In the 19th century, European settlers arrived at Wooyung and, the first permanent settlement there was known of 'O'Niel's Camp' and then, from 1882, as 'Billinudgel Camp'.

In 1919 a wooden school was built there and, in the lead up to its completion, the Education Department were petitioned by local people to name the school 'Newhaven' (also recorded as New Haven) following a community meeting in July 1918. They formed a Newhaven Progress Association and were disappointed when the school and area was named Wooyung in November 1919.

== Wooyung Nature Reserve ==
In March 1999, the Wooyung Nature Reserve was established, a protected area of 87 hectares, in the north of the Wooyung locality. The Reserve contains littoral rainforest and borders on the beach.

== Development controversy ==
In 2006, Tweed Shire Council administrator Lucy Turnbull approved a plan for a controversial $240 million resort at Wooyung, despite there being alleged legal, cultural, environmental and community concerns with the proposed development. As of 2019, funding for the project had still yet to be settled.

== Current usage ==
Wooyung is currently home to the Wooyung Beach Holiday Park, described in the official NSW Tourist website as "one of the few remaining bush camping sites on the east coast".

== Demographics ==
As of the 2021 Australian census, 139 people resided in Wooyung, up from 118 in the 2016 census. The median age of persons in Wooyung was 49 years. There were more males than females, with 51.8% of the population male and 48.2% female. The average household size was 2.5 people per household.
