= Nunderi, New South Wales =

Nunderi New South Wales
- Coordinates: 28°19′14″S 153°27′34″E
- Population: 696 (2021 census)
- Postcode(s): 2484
- LGA(s): Tweed Shire
- State electorate(s): Tweed
- Federal division(s): Richmond

Nunderi is a locality in the Tweed Shire of New South Wales, Australia. It had a population of 696 as of the 2021 census.

== Demographics ==
As of the 2021 Australian census, 696 people resided in Nunderi, up from 656 in the 2016 census. The median age of persons in Nunderi was 50 years. There were fewer males than females, with 49.9% of the population male and 50.1% female. The average household size was 2.7 people per household.
