= Upper Duroby, New South Wales =

Town in New South Wales, Australia

Upper Duroby New South Wales
- Coordinates: 28°15′6″S 153°26′11″E
- Population: 118 (2021 census)
- Postcode(s): 2486
- LGA(s): Tweed Shire
- State electorate(s): Tweed
- Federal division(s): Richmond

Upper Duroby is a locality in the Tweed Shire of New South Wales, Australia. It had a population of 118 according to the 2021 census.
