= Kielvale, New South Wales =

Town in New South Wales, Australia

Kielvale
- Town
- Country: Australia
- State: New South Wales
- LGA: Tweed Shire

Government
  - State electorate: Tweed
  - Federal division: Richmond

Population
  - Total: 325 (2011 census)
- Time zone: UTC+10 (AEST)
  - Summer (DST): UTC+11 (AEDT)
- Postcode: 2484

Kielvale is a town in north-eastern New South Wales, Australia, in the Tweed Shire.

The Ngandowal and Minyungbal speaking people of the Bundjalung people are the traditional owners of the Tweed region, including Kielvale, and the surrounding areas.

== Demographics ==
In the 2011 census, Kielvale recorded a population of 325 people, 48% female and 52% male.

The median age of the Kielvale population was 45 years, 8 years above the national median of 37.

85% of people living in Kielvale were born in Australia. The other top responses for country of birth were England 2.8%, Italy 1.2%, Colombia 0.9%, China 0.9%, Belgium 0.9%.

92% of people spoke only English at home; the next most common languages were 2.1% Spanish, 1.5% Italian, 0.9% Russian,
