= Brays =

Brays may refer to:

- Brays, Missouri, United States, an unincorporated community
- Brays Fork, Virginia, United States, an unincorporated community also known as Brays
- Brays Creek, New South Wales, Australia
