= Dunbible =

Town in New South Wales, Australia

- Town
- Coordinates: 28.377452°S 153.386748°E
- Country: Australia
- State: New South Wales
- LGA: Tweed Shire

Government
  - State electorate: Tweed
  - Federal division: Richmond

Population
  - Total: 329 (2011 census)
- Time zone: UTC+10 (AEST)
  - Summer (DST): UTC+11 (AEDT)
- Postcode: 2484

Dunbible is a town in north-eastern New South Wales, Australia, in the Tweed Shire and it is on the lands of the Bundjalung people or the Coodjingburra Clan.

The Northern Rivers Rail Trail passes through the village.

== Origin of place name ==
The name Dunbible is believed to have been derived from the Bundjalung language word djunbi, which means 'black apple tree'. The 'ible' suffix was to indicate that there were many trees.

The NSW Geographical Names Board has also suggested that the name could have came from a local lay pastor who fell off a log he was using to cross a river and dropped his bible resulting in it being 'done'.

== European history ==
From the late 1880s, Dunbible was home to a very small community and it was primarily made up of farm land for dairy, cattle and pigs. It was an isolated community until the opening of Dunbible Station, which was a part of the Murwillumbah railway line, on 24 December 1894. The addition of the railway helped develop the dairy industry as milk and other dairy products could be transported quickly and easily to larger markets via the Norco Co-operative.

1894 is also when the, now heritage, Dunbible Creek Bridge was constructed which is 65 metres (213 ft) in length; it is one of the few steel trussed bridges along the route. It was designed by the then NSW Railways Chief Engineer, Henry Deane. In 2022 major work was undertaken to preserve and update the bridge.

== Demographics ==
In the 2011 census, Dunbible recorded a population of 329 people, 49.5% female and 50.5% male.

The median age of the Dunbible population was 43 years, 6 years above the national median of 37.

83.3% of people living in Dunbible were born in Australia. The other top responses for country of birth were England 1.8%, India 1.8%, Taiwan 1.2%, Netherlands 1.2%, Germany 0.9%.

87.9% of people spoke only English at home; the next most common languages were 3.9% Punjabi, 1.2% Mandarin, 0.9% German.
