= Midginbil =

Midginbil New South Wales
- Coordinates: 28°29′49″S 153°15′34″E
- Population: 84 (2021 census)
- Postcode(s): 2484
- LGA(s): Tweed Shire
- State electorate(s): Lismore
- Federal division(s): Richmond

Midginbil is a locality in the Tweed Shire of New South Wales, Australia. It had a population of 84 as of the 2021 census.

== Demographics ==
As of the 2021 Australian census, 84 people resided in Midginbil, up from 72 in the 2016 census. The median age of persons in Midginbil was 50 years. There were fewer males than females, with 48.2% of the population male and 51.8% female. The average household size was 2.7 people per household.
