= Fernvale =

Fernvale may refer to:

== Australia ==
- Fernvale, New South Wales, a town
- Fernvale, Queensland, a town

== Singapore ==
- Fernvale, Singapore, a precinct of the Sengkang district, located in north-eastern Singapore
  - Fernvale LRT station, the light rail transit station that serves it

== United States ==
- Fernvale, Tennessee, an unincorporated community
