= Farrants Hill, New South Wales =

Suburb of Tweed Shire, New South Wales, Australia

Farrants Hill
- Suburb
- Coordinates: 28°19′4″S 153°29′8″E
- Country: Australia
- State: New South Wales
- Region: Northern Rivers
- LGA: Tweed Shire
- Location: 13.1 km (8.1 mi) SW of Murwillumbah; 29.3 km (18.2 mi) SW of Tweed Heads; 759.9 km (472.2 mi) NW of Sydney

Government
  - State electorate: Lismore
  - Federal division: Richmond

Population
  - Total: 124 (2016 census)
- Time zone: UTC+10 (AEST)
  - Summer (DST): UTC+11 (AEDT)
- Postcode: 2484

Farrants Hill is a small rural locality approximately 29 kilometres (18 mi) south-west of Tweed Heads in the Tweed Shire. It is part of the Northern Rivers region of New South Wales, Australia.

The Ngandowal and Minyungbal speaking people of the Bundjalung people are the traditional owners of the Tweed region, including Farrants Hill and the surrounding areas.

At the 2016 census, the town recorded a population of 124.
