= Murwillumbah railway station =

Historic site in New South Wales, Australia

Murwillumbah
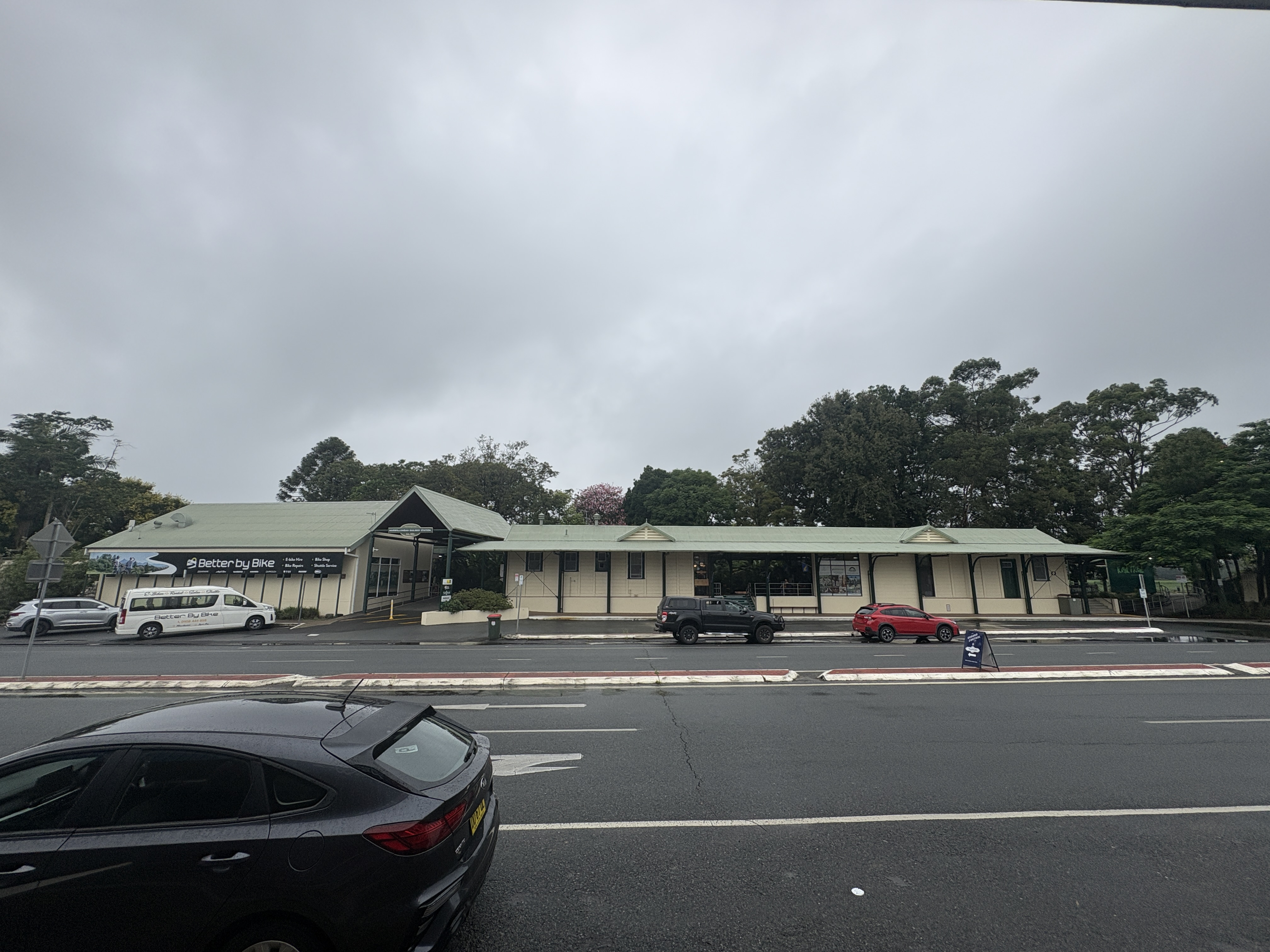
- Murwillumbah railway station, now the start of the Northern Rivers Rail Trail, in 2026

General information
- Location: Old Pacific Highway, South Murwillumbah, Australia
- Coordinates: 28°19′48″S 153°24′10″E
- Owner: Transport Asset Manager of New South Wales
- Operator: NSW TrainLink
- Line: Murwillumbah
- Distance: 934.91 km (580.93 mi) from Central
- Platforms: 1
- Tracks: 2

Construction
- Structure type: Ground
- Accessible: Yes

Other information
- Status: NSW TrainLink coach stop

History
- Opened: 24 December 1894

New South Wales Heritage Register
- Official name: Murwillumbah Railway Station and yard group
- Type: State heritage (complex / group)
- Designated: 2 April 1999
- Reference no.: 1206
- Type: Railway Platform/Station
- Category: Transport – Rail
Route map
Location

The Murwillumbah railway station is a heritage-listed former terminus railway station located on the Murwillumbah line in South Murwillumbah, in the Tweed Shire local government area of New South Wales, Australia. The former railway station is also known as the Murwillumbah Railway Station and yard group. The station opened on 24 December 1894 and closed on 16 May 2004 when the line from Casino was closed.

The station was added to the New South Wales State Heritage Register on 2 April 1999.

The station is located on the lands of the Bundjalung people who named the location where the station now stands Quinyumguinyum as quinyum plants, a variety of native belladonna, grew there.

== History ==
Beyond the station, the line continued for a few kilometres as a freight line to Condong. It served a sugar mill until 1972. Murwillumbah had a X200 shunter until the opening of a new motorail siding in August 1988 made it surplus.

Despite no longer being served by trains, the station remains open as a NSW TrainLink booking office. The station forecourt is served by NSW TrainLink coach services to Casino, Tweed Heads and Robina, and Premier Motor Service services to Brisbane, Lismore and Sydney. It is also currently used as the town's tourist information centre.

== Description ==
The complex comprises a type 12 station pre-cast concrete freight station, erected c. 1926; a goods shed being a side shed without awning with an end platform, erected in 1894. Other structures included a concrete/steel/brick platform face; a water tower with a round brick base with cast iron tank over, erected c. 1894; and a jib crane – T533, erected 1894.

Murwillumbah has one platform, with a passing loop and motorail siding at the northern end of the station. It was served by trains from Sydney including the North Coast Mail until 1973, when replaced by the Gold Coast Motorail which in February 1990 was replaced by a XPT service.

== Heritage listing ==
Murwillumbah is a good example of a station constructed in the 1920s from pre cast concrete, the predominant material of the period of which relatively little has survived. The building is a substantial structure which has maintained the form of the earlier building with the change of material. It forms part of a group that contains a very good goods shed example and a rare water tank on a round brick base, only three of these were built, all on the north coast line. The station building has had some recent additions of poor quality which detract from significance. The site is also significant because of its connection with the carrying of vehicles on the former Motorail service and the facilities connected with that activity.

Murwillumbah railway station was listed on the New South Wales State Heritage Register on 2 April 1999, having satisfied the following criteria:

- The place possesses uncommon, rare or endangered aspects of the cultural or natural history of New South Wales.
- This item is assessed as historically rare. This item is assessed as scientifically rare. This item is assessed as architecturally rare. This item is assessed as socially rare.

== Historical images ==
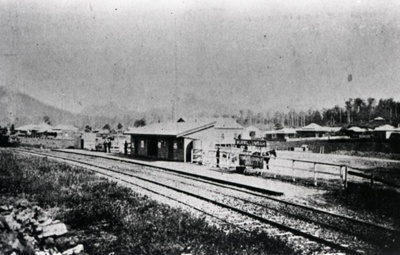
Murwillumbah Railway Station, 1905

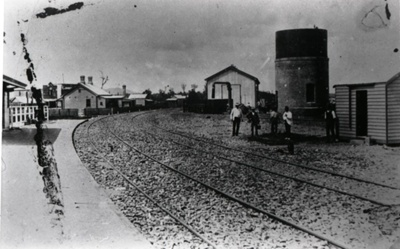
Murwillumbah Railway Station, 1905

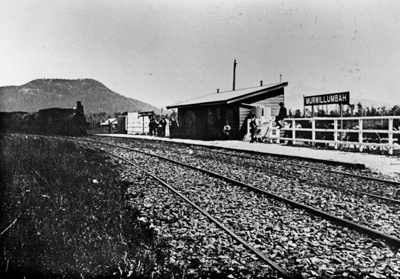
Steam train approaching Murwillumbah Railway Station, 1904

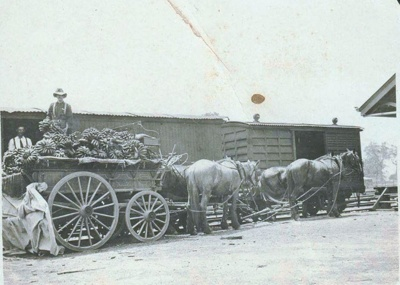
Four draft horses with wagon of unpacked bananas beside two railway wagons at Murwillumbah Railway Station, circa 1910

== See also ==
- List of railway stations in New South Wales
