= Mount Warning, New South Wales =

Wollumbin (formerly Mount Warning)
- Town
- Coordinates: 28°22′54″S 153°17′4″E
- Country: Australia
- State: New South Wales
- LGA: Tweed Shire

Government
  - State electorate: Lismore
  - Federal division: Richmond

Population
  - Total: 148 (2021 census)
- Postcode: 2484

Wollumbin (formerly Mount Warning) is a locality in the Tweed Shire of New South Wales, Australia. It had a population of 148 as of the 2021 census.
