= Chowan Creek, New South Wales =

Suburb of Tweed Shire, New South Wales, Australia

Chowan Creek New South Wales
- Coordinates: 28°27′3″S 153°22′20″E
- Population: 37 (2016 census)
- Postcode(s): 2484
- Time zone: AEST (UTC+10)
  - Summer (DST): AEDT (UTC+11)
- LGA(s): Tweed Shire
- Region: Northern Rivers
- State electorate(s): Lismore
- Federal division(s): Richmond

Chowan Creek is a small rural locality in the Tweed Shire, part of the Northern Rivers region of New South Wales, Australia.

At the 2016 census, the town recorded a population of 37.
