= Kingscliff, New South Wales =

Town in New South Wales, Australia

Kingscliff
- Town
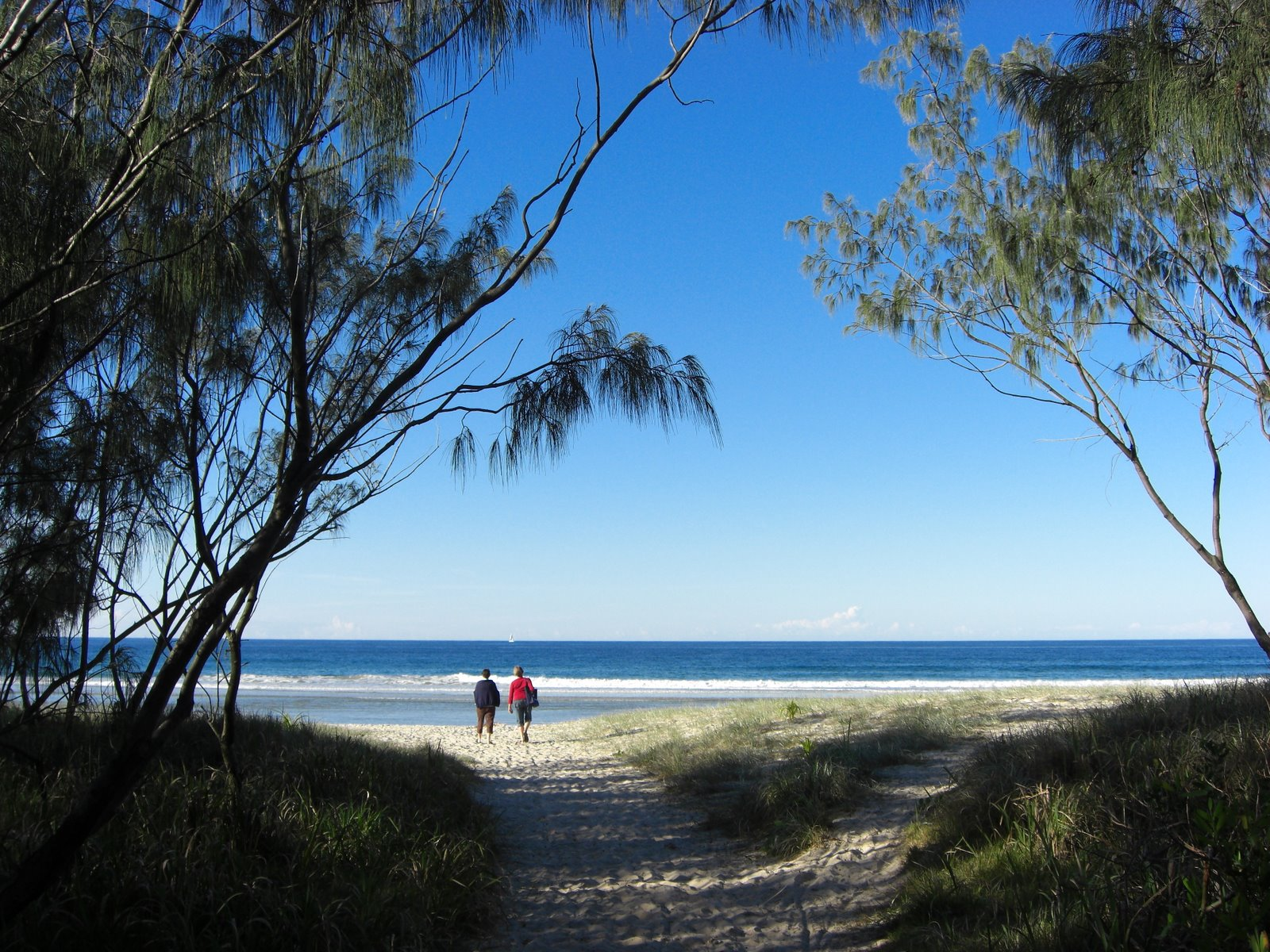
- Kingscliff Beach

- Coordinates: 28°15′23″S 153°34′41″E
- Country: Australia
- State: New South Wales
- Region: Northern Rivers
- LGA: Tweed Shire
- Location: 112 km (70 mi) SSE of Brisbane; 13 km (8.1 mi) SSE of Tweed Heads; 60 km (37 mi) N of Byron Bay; 805 km (500 mi) NNE of Sydney

Government
  - State electorate: Tweed
  - Federal division: Richmond
- Elevation: 5 m (16 ft)

Population
  - Total: 7,464 (2016 census)
- Postcode: 2487
Localities around Kingscliff
Chinderah	Fingal Head	Pacific Ocean
Cudgen	Kingscliff	Pacific Ocean
Cudgen	Casuarina	Pacific Ocean

Kingscliff is a coastal town 13 kilometres (8.1 mi) south of Tweed Heads in the Northern Rivers region of New South Wales, Australia.

It is a beach community offering a variety of holiday accommodations. Together with the villages of Chinderah and Fingal, it is a tourist destination that provides beach and estuary access for swimming, surfing, fishing and water sports.

The Ngandowal and Minyungbal-speaking people of the Bundjalung Nation are recognised as being the traditional owners of the Tweed region, including Kingscliff, and the surrounding areas.

== Origin of place name ==
The area now known as Kingscliff was first known to European settlers as Sutherland Point, as named by James Cook in 1770, and then Cudgen Headland. In 1926 it changed its name to Kingscliff after a nearby estate due to confusion with the nearby Cudgen.

== History ==
The first private owner of much of the land was Carl Hans Gaenshirt who purchased it around the 1870s. He established a vineyard on the land and built a cottage. After his death, starting from 1915, extensive land subdivision begun.

== Overview ==
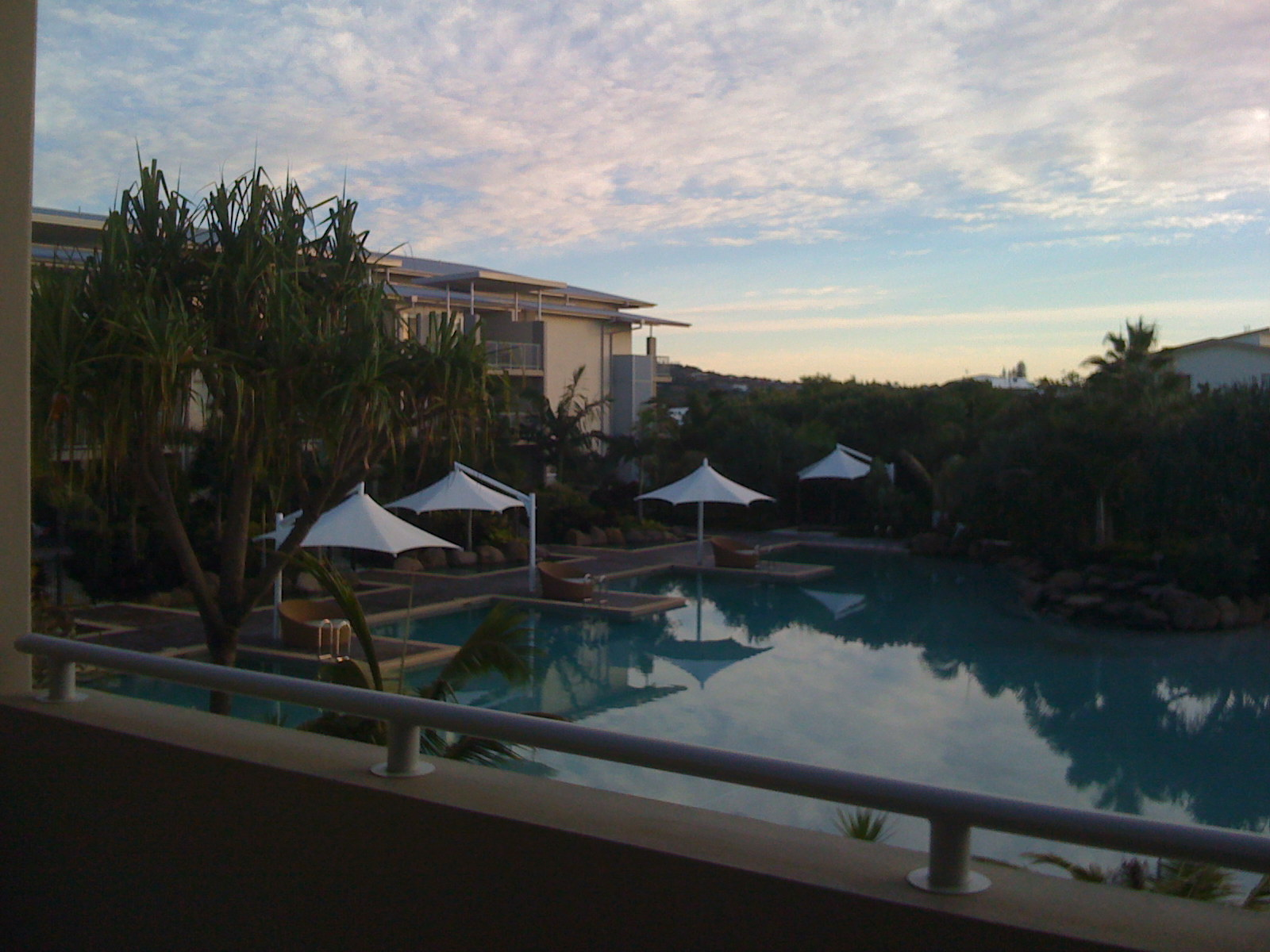
View of a holiday resort, Kingscliff, 2009

Its main street, Marine Parade, contains many cafes, shops and accommodation located directly across from Kingscliff beach and creek. The town also has two primary schools and a state high school.

An oceanway allows pedestrians and cyclists to move from the historic centre of town out to the emerging new communities along the Tweed Coast in a sustainable manner.

Kingscliff was the home to Peter and Jeremy Oxley who formed the 1980s band, the Sunnyboys.

A scene from the film Aquamarine was filmed on Marine Parade in late 2007.

The main Kingscliff beach has been severely affected by erosion, with portions of the caravan park and beachside carparks being threatened or reclaimed by the sea. In December 2014, the state environment ministry announced it would split with Tweed Shire the $300,000 cost of an environmental impact study for a plan to build a 500-metre seawall and fill in the beach with imported sand.

In March 2016 work began on the Kingscliff Foreshore Revitalisation Project which will be rolled out in 3 stages. Stage 1 involves building a new seawall to save the Cudgen Headland Surf Life Saving Club, Kingscliff Beach Holiday Park and Kingscliff Beach Bowls Club from erosion. Stage 2 is to refurbish Kingscliff Beach Holiday Park, meaning a rollback of camping facilities with a focus on cabins. Stage 3 will be focused on creating a more community oriented space for tourists and locals alike with the development of Kingscliff Central Park. The park is expected to become the new social hub of Kingscliff and make the transition from the main street to the beach more streamlined. It will also result in far better beach views for businesses on Marine Parade.

== Demographics ==
According to the 2016 census of Population, there were 7,464 people in Kingscliff.

- Aboriginal and Torres Strait Islander people made up 3.8% of the population.
- 78.9% of people were born in Australia. The next most common countries of birth were England 4.5% and New Zealand 2.6%.
- 90.3% of people spoke only English at home.
- The most common responses for religion were No Religion 29.0%, Catholic 24.7% and Anglican 19.7%.

== Sport and recreation ==
A number of well-known sporting teams represent the local area, including the Cudgen Hornets, the local rugby league club, who play their home games at Ned Byrne Field. In September 2009, Kingscliff hosted a stage of the World Rally Championship.

Kingscliff Wolves Soccer Club was founded in 1968. The club's home ground is the Walter Peate Oval. The club competes in the Gold Coast Premier League, where it has been one of the leading sides for the past few decades.

There are many bike paths for local cyclists through the parks along Kingscliff's beaches. The neighbouring locality of Salt, part of the small town of Casuarina, is accessible via a bike path.
