= Doon Doon, New South Wales =

Suburb of Tweed Shire, New South Wales, Australia

Doon Doon
- Suburb
- Coordinates: 28°29′36.6″S 153°17′57.4″E
- Country: Australia
- State: New South Wales
- Region: Northern Rivers
- LGA: Tweed Shire
- Location: 20 km (12 mi) SW of Murwillumbah; 40 km (25 mi) SW of Tweed Heads; 630 km (390 mi) NW of Sydney

Government
  - State electorate: Lismore
  - Federal division: Richmond

Population
  - Total: 97 (2016 census)
- Time zone: UTC+10 (AEST)
  - Summer (DST): UTC+11 (AEDT)
- Postcode: 2484

Doon Doon is a small rural locality approximately 40 kilometres (25 mi) south-west of Tweed Heads in the Tweed Shire. It is a part of the Northern Rivers region of New South Wales, Australia.

== Origin of place name ==
The place name Doon Doon comes from the Yugambeh–Bundjalung languages and it is thought to either be from the chain word doan doan, meaning 'black or dark' or from the word tooun meaning 'grave'.

== Demographics ==
At the 2016 census, the town recorded a population of 97, with a median age of 57.
