= Clothiers Creek =

Town in New South Wales, Australia

Coordinates: 28°20′S 153°30′E

- Town
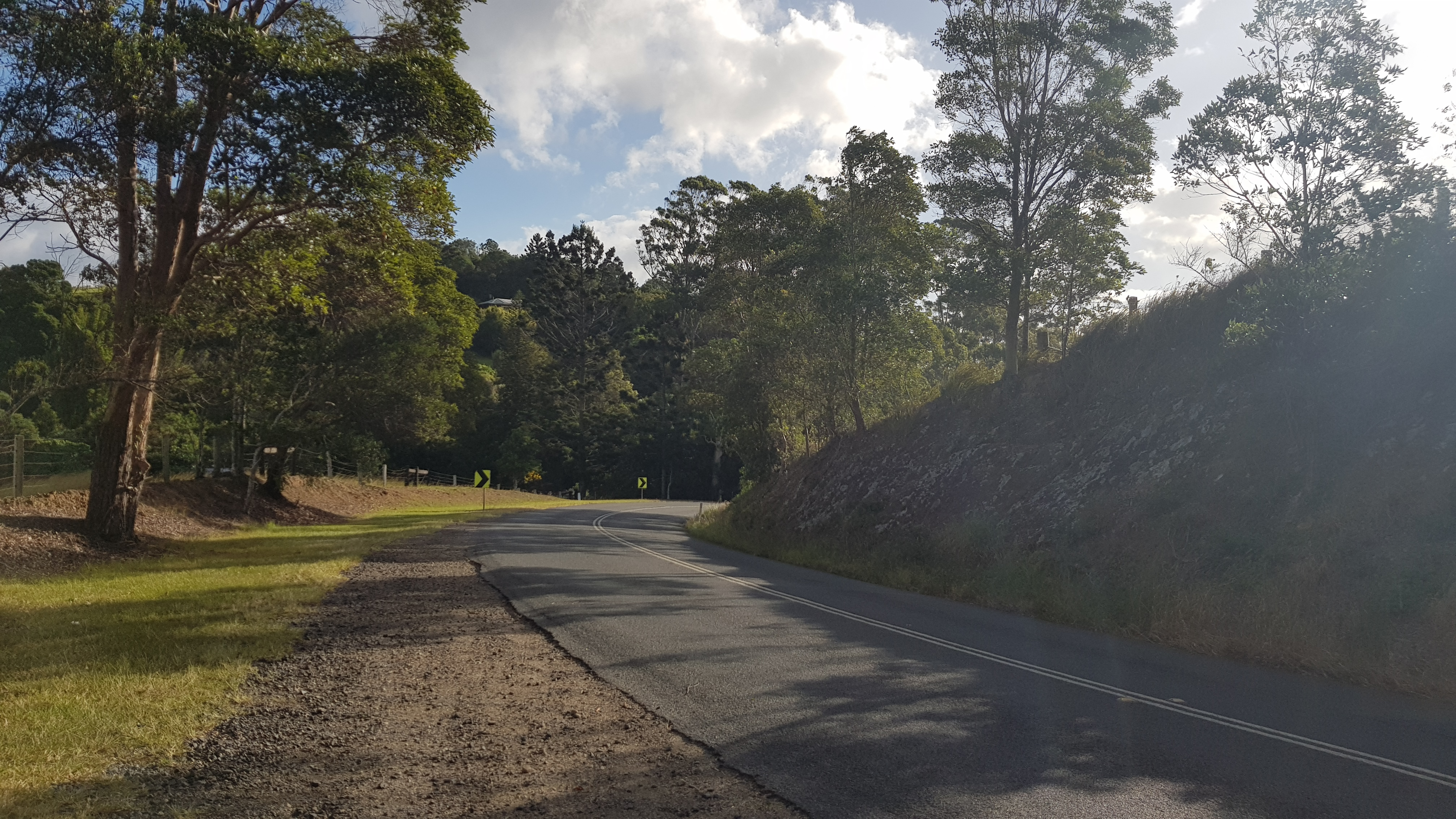
- Clothiers Creek Road, 2023
- Country: Australia
- State: New South Wales
- LGA: Tweed Shire

Government
  - State electorate: Tweed
  - Federal division: Richmond

Population
  - Total: 363 (2011 census)
- Time zone: UTC+10 (AEST)
  - Summer (DST): UTC+11 (AEDT)
- Postcode: 2484

Clothiers Creek is a town in north-eastern New South Wales, Australia, in the Tweed Shire and it is located 26 kilometres (16 mi) south of the regional centre of Tweed Heads and 11.5 kilometres (7.1 mi) east of Murwillumbah.

The traditional onwers of this place are the Ngandowal and Minyungbal speaking people of the Bundjalung Nation. This includes the Goodjinburra, Tul-gi-gin, and Moorung – Moobah clans.

== Demographics ==
In the 2011 census, Clothiers Creek recorded a population of 363 people, 50.1% female and 49.9% male.

The median age of the Clothiers Creek population was 48 years, 11 years above the national median of 37.

79.5% of people living in Clothiers Creek were born in Australia. The other top responses for country of birth were England 3.9%, New Zealand 2.2%, Thailand 1.7%, Germany 1.1%, Canada 0.8%.

94.2% of people spoke only English at home; the next most common languages were 1.1% Thai, 0.8% Dutch, 0.8% French.
