= Tygalgah =

- Town
- Coordinates: 28°17′53″S 153°25′35″E
- Country: Australia
- State: New South Wales
- LGA: Tweed Shire

Government
  - State electorate: Lismore
  - Federal division: Richmond

Population
  - Total: 116 (2021 census)
- Postcode: 2484

Tygalgah is a locality in the Tweed Shire of New South Wales, Australia. It had a population of 116 as of the 2021 census. As of 2021, the total population is 52.9% male, and 47.1% female.
