= Fernvale, New South Wales =

Town in New South Wales, Australia

Fernvale
- Town
- Coordinates: 28.36500°S 153.42611°E
- Country: Australia
- State: New South Wales
- LGA: Tweed Shire

Government
  - State electorate: Tweed
  - Federal division: Richmond

Population
  - Total: 238 (2011 census)
- Time zone: UTC+10 (AEST)
  - Summer (DST): UTC+11 (AEDT)
- Postcode: 2484

Fernvale is a town in north-eastern New South Wales, Australia, in the Tweed Shire.

== Demographics ==
In the 2011 census, Fernvale recorded a population of 238 people, with 49.2% female and 50.8% male residents.

The median age of the Fernvale population was 42 years, which is 5 years above the national median of 37.

The majority of people living in Fernvale, accounting for 81.2%, were born in Australia. Other notable countries of birth included England 6.3%, India 1.3%, Germany 1.3%, Belgium 1.3%, Japan 1.3%.

Regarding language spoken at home, 87.8% of residents spoke only English. The next most common languages spoken were Japanese, 1.3% Russian, 1.3% French, 1.3% Maltese, and 1.3% Thai.
