= Dum Dum, New South Wales =

Dum Dum New South Wales
- Coordinates: 28°22′54″S 153°21′34″E
- Population: 125 (2021 census)
- Postcode(s): 2484
- LGA(s): Tweed Shire
- State electorate(s): Lismore
- Federal division(s): Richmond

Dum Dum is a locality in the Tweed Shire of New South Wales, Australia. It had a population of 125 as of the 2021 census.
