= Pottsville, New South Wales =

Town in New South Wales, Australia

Pottsville
- Town
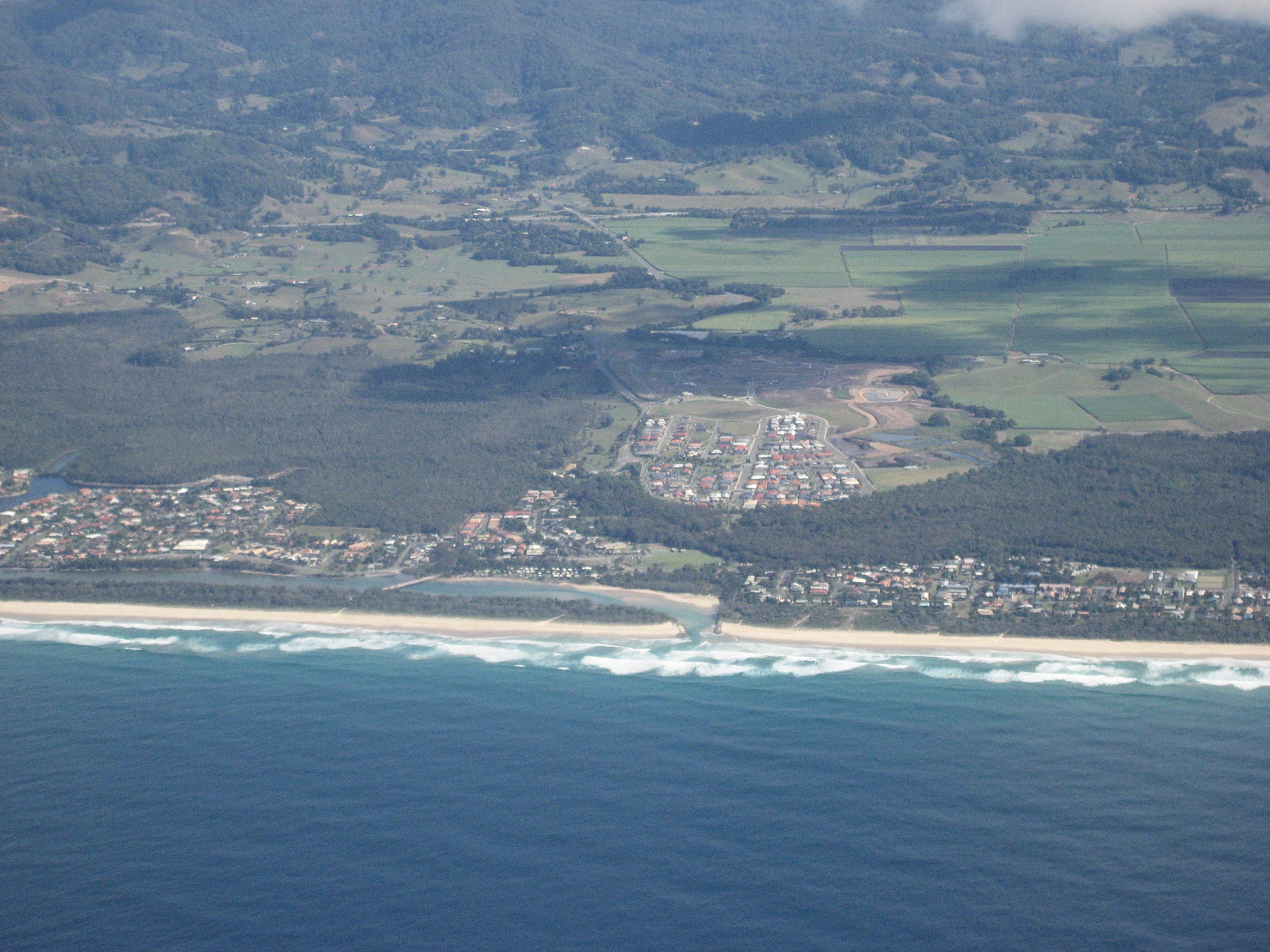
- Aerial photograph of Pottsville in 2007

- Coordinates: 28°23′S 153°34′E
- Country: Australia
- State: New South Wales
- Region: Northern Rivers
- LGA: Tweed Shire

Population
  - Total: 7,209 (2021 census)
- Postcode: 2489

Pottsville is a town in the Northern Rivers region of New South Wales, Australia in Tweed Shire. At the 2021 Census, Pottsville had a population of 7,209.

The Ngandowal and Minyungbal speaking people of the Bundjalung people are the traditional owners of the Tweed region, including Pottsville, and the surrounding areas.

== History ==
Bill Potts owned the first house in Pottsville and the location was initially named Potts Point. Soon though, the town was renamed Pottsville to alleviate any confusion with the place of the same name in Sydney.

Pottsville includes housing developments such as Pottsville Waters, Koala Beach, Seabreeze and Black Rocks Estate.

Pottsville is also home to Pottsville Beach Public School and St Ambrose Primary School.

== Demographics ==
In the 2021 census, Pottsville had a total population of 7,209.

Historical population
| Year | Pop. | ±% |
|---|---|---|
| 1971 | 245 | — |
| 1976 | 332 | +35.5% |
| 1981 | 673 | +102.7% |
| 1986 | 621 | −7.7% |
| 1991 | 1,293 | +108.2% |
| 1996 | 1,987 | +53.7% |
| 2001 | 2,576 | +29.6% |
| 2006 | 3,298 | +28.0% |
| 2011 | 5,735 | +73.9% |
| 2016 | 6,550 | +14.2% |
| 2021 | 7,209 | +10.1% |
Source: Australian Bureau of Statistics data.
