= Round Mountain, New South Wales =

Town in New South Wales, Australia

Round Mountain
- Town
- Coordinates: 28°21′33″S 153°32′02″E
- Country: Australia
- State: New South Wales
- LGA: Tweed Shire

Government
  - State electorate: Tweed
  - Federal division: Richmond

Population
  - Total: 143 (2016 census)
- Time zone: UTC+10 (AEST)
  - Summer (DST): UTC+11 (AEDT)
- Postcode: 2484

Round Mountain is a town in north-eastern New South Wales, Australia, in the Tweed Shire.

The Ngandowal and Minyungbal speaking people of the Bundjalung people are the traditional owners of the Tweed region, including Round Mountain, and the surrounding areas.

== Demographics ==
In the 2016 census, Round Mountain recorded a population of 143 (51.4% male).

The median age was 47, 9 years above the national median of 38.

81.8% of people living in Round Mountain were born in Australia. The other top responses for country of birth were England 7.0%, New Zealand 2.1% and Scotland 2.1%.

94.3% of people spoke only English at home. There were no other responses for language spoken at home.
