= Joshua Bray =

New South Wales colonist (1838–1918)

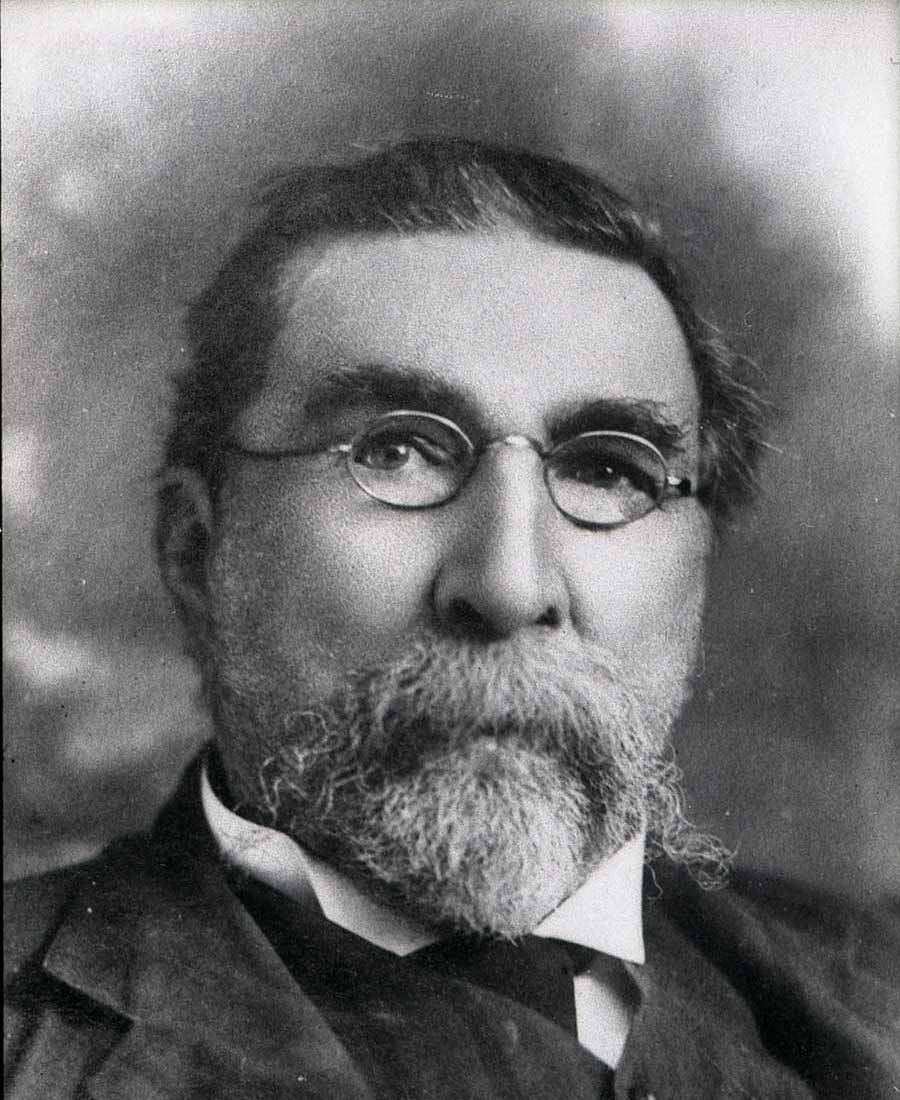
Joshual Bray, date unknown

Joshua Bray (3 September 1838 – 20 February 1918) was one of the early colonists who settled in the Tweed Region of New South Wales, Australia. He is credited as being one of the 'founders' of Murwillumbah and became that town's first magistrate, clerk of petty sessions and postmaster among numerous other roles.

He is often remembered as the 'King of the Tweed'.

== Early life ==
Bray was born in Appin, New South Wales and he was the sixth of ten children born to John and Charlotte Bray. He spend most of his early life, from the age of two, at the family property, called Denfield, just outside of Campbelltown. When he was 6 years old, his mother died and, in 1848, his father remarried to Elizabeth Rowland.

When Bray was 16, in 1855, his father took up land on the Tumut River, called Brungle (now Brungle, New South Wales) and Bray, alongside his brothers, ran the property. In around 1861 Bray met Rosalie Gertrude Nixon (known as Gertrude) who would later become his wife, and the two began to write letters to each other when apart.

In September 1862 Bray was appointed a Magistrate of the Colony.

== Life in the Tweed Region ==
In 1862 Bray went into partnership with Samuel Gray, who was one of his brothers-in-law, and they purchased the lease on a large property in the Tweed Region which they named Upper Walumban (also recorded as Wollumben and Walumbin Run) with a total land area of 16,000 acres (65 km^{2}). For this investment Bray moved to the region in 1863, sailing from Sydney to Ballina, and arriving on 24 June.

Once in the Tweed Bray began clearing and draining much of the land, with the help of Aboriginal labour, and begun planting crops including tobacco, sugar cane and corn. Bray was unlike many other settlers in the region in his willingness to work with local Aboriginal people, who were mostly Bundjalung, and he allowed all Aboriginal people working for him to have time off to hunt and conduct ceremonies. Bray took a keen interest in the local Aboriginal people and he immediately began to learn the Yugambeh–Bundjalung languages and was soon able to carry a conversation with people in their own language. He also studied Bundjalung customs and published a series of articles, including information about cultural beliefs and ceremonies, in the Science of man journal.

In July 1864, to stock the station, Bray became the first man to drove cattle across the Nightcap Range and, in a letter to his future wife, he described it as "very unpleasant". In this journey he was assisted by two Aboriginal men Grasshopper and Abraham and, during a period in which they were stranded, Grasshopper supplemented their limited supplies with yams and a snake which he caught and prepared for them.

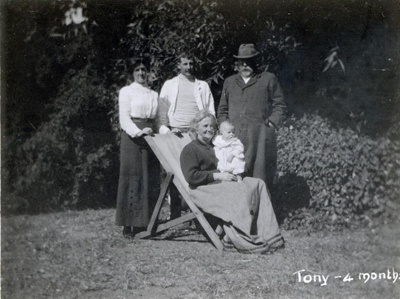
The Bray Family at Kynnumboon, 1913

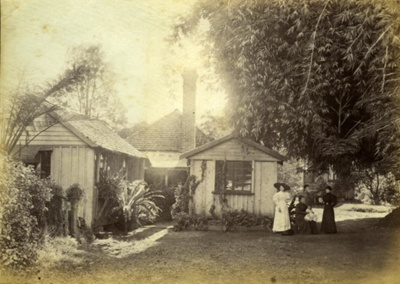
The Kynnumboon Homestead, c1890

In 1865 during a visit to his family, Bray became engaged to, and then married, Gertrude on 15 May 1866 and, together, they had 14 children of which 13 survived. On their arrival in the Tweed region together they were, soon after, able to move into the home he had built from them called Kynnumboon after the Bundjalung name for where it was built (this is now Kynnumboon, New South Wales), just outside of Murwillumbah which Bray also named. This was separate from the Gray's home (named Coolamon).

Throughout the remainder of the 1860s and beyond Bray became increasingly involved on public life in the Tweed and he became a prominent community leader. In 1866 he became the first postmaster when the first post office was established at his home and Gertrude served as the postmistress; it was known as 'Wollumben Post Office'. This appointment made official work that Bray had already been doing as, before the post office opened, Bray had already been organising Aboriginal men to carry mail from up from Ballina and Casino and also down from Queensland.

In 1870 Bray was appointed the Police and Stipendiary Magistrate of the region and, soon after, the Magistrate of the Court of Petty Sessions. In these roles he lobbied for a new court house to be erected at Murwillumbah which was successful by 1877. He was, among other roles, also the local justice of the peace, gold warden, coroner, Protector of Aborigines and de facto doctor and dentist.

== Later life and death ==
Bray started taking a step back from his government roles in the 1890s and he and Gertrude travelled extensively.

He died on 20 February 1918, after suffering two strokes, and is buried at Murwillumbah Old Cemetery (also known as Banner Street Memorial Park).
