= Stotts Creek, New South Wales =

Stotts Creek New South Wales
- Coordinates: 28°16′55″S 153°30′32″E
- Population: 10 (2021 census)
- Postcode(s): 2487
- LGA(s): Tweed Shire
- State electorate(s): Tweed
- Federal division(s): Richmond

Stotts Creek is a locality in the Tweed Shire of New South Wales, Australia. It had a population of 10 as of the 2021 census.
