= Tweed Shire =

Local government area in New South Wales, Australia

- Local government area
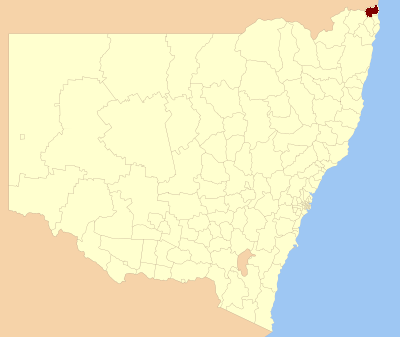
- Location in New South Wales

- Interactive map of Tweed Shire
- Coordinates: 28°20′S 153°23′E
- Country: Australia
- State: New South Wales
- Region: Northern Rivers
- Established: 1947
- Council seat: Murwillumbah

Government
  - Mayor: Chris Cherry
  - State electorates: Tweed; Lismore
  - Federal division: Richmond

Area
  - Total: 1,321 km^{2} (510 sq mi)

Population
  - Totals: 91,371 (2016); 96,108 (2018 est.)
  - Density: 69.168/km^{2} (179.14/sq mi)
- Website: Tweed Shire
LGAs around Tweed Shire
Scenic Rim (Qld)	Gold Coast (Qld)	Coral Sea (Pacific Ocean)
Kyogle	Tweed Shire	Coral Sea (Pacific Ocean)
Lismore	Byron	Coral Sea (Pacific Ocean)

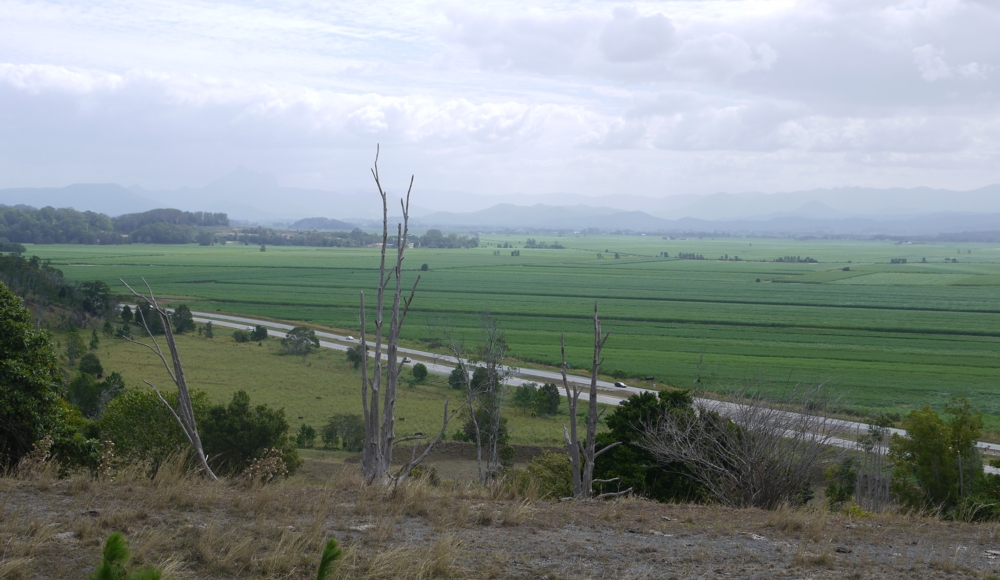
Pacific Motorway and Tweed Valley viewed from Duranbah

Tweed Shire is a local government area located in the Northern Rivers region of New South Wales, Australia. It is adjacent to the border with Queensland, where that meets the Coral Sea. Administered from the town of Murwillumbah, Tweed Shire covers an area of 1,321 square kilometres (510 sq mi), and has existed as a local government entity since 1947. It was named for the Tweed River.

The current mayor of Tweed Shire Council is Chris Cherry.

== History ==
The European history of the Tweed Shire began in 1823 when the Tweed River was explored by John Oxley. After sheltering on Cook Island (4 km from the river's mouth), Oxely travelled 11 kilometres (6.8 mi) up river. In 1828, Captain H. J. Rous explored 50 kilometres (31 mi) up the river. Settlers began to arrive in 1828, the first of which were the cedar getters, who came to harvest Great Red Cedars and send them back to England. During the height of the cedar logging industry, the Tweed Valley was one of the wealthiest districts in Australia.

The Municipality of Murwillumbah was created on 25 May 1902, and held its first meeting on 22 August 1902, at which Peter Street was elected its first mayor. The Shire of Tweed, with its primary centre of population at Tumbulgum on the Tweed River, came into being in the surrounding area on 7 March 1906 with the enactment of the Local Government Act 1906 (NSW). On 1 January 1947, the two amalgamated to form Tweed Shire.

== Heritage listings ==
The Tweed Shire has a number of heritage-listed sites, including:

- Murwillumbah, Casino-Murwillumbah railway: Murwillumbah railway station
- High Conservation Value Old Growth forest

== Towns and localities ==
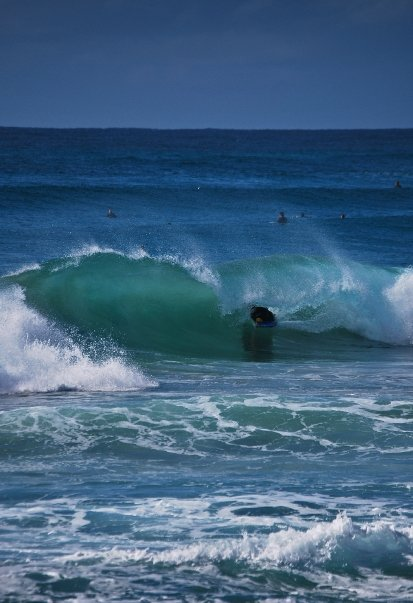
Duranbah Beach

Tweed Heads

- Tweed Heads
- Banora Point
- Bilambil
- Bilambil Heights
- Chinderah
- Fingal Head
- Kingscliff
- Piggabeen
- Terranora
- Tweed Heads South
- Tweed Heads West

Tweed Coast

- Bogangar
- Cabarita Beach
- Casuarina
- Cudgen
- Duranbah
- Hastings Point
- Kingscliff
- Pottsville
- Round Mountain
- Tanglewood
- Wooyung

Murwillumbah

- Murwillumbah
- Bray Park
- Byangum
- Fernvale
- South Murwillumbah

Villages

- Burringbar
- Chillingham
- Condong
- Kunghur
- Tomewin
- Tumbulgum
- Tyalgum
- Uki

Other localities

- Brays Creek
- Bungalora
- Cedar Creek
- Carool
- Clothiers Creek
- Cobaki
- Cobaki Lakes
- Crystal Creek
- Cudgera Creek
- Doon Doon
- Dum Dum
- Dunbible
- Dungay
- Duroby
- Eungella
- Glengarrie
- Kielvale
- Kings Forest
- Kynnumboon
- Limpinwood
- Midginbil
- Mooball
- Mount Burrell
- Mount Warning
- Nobbys Creek
- North Arm
- Numinbah
- Pumpenbil
- Reserve Creek
- Stokers Siding
- Stotts Creek
- Terragon
- Tygalgah
- Upper Burringbar
- Upper Crystal Creek
- Upper Duroby
- Urliup

Queensland

- Gold Coast Airport (Tweed Heads part)

== Demographics ==
At the 2011 census, there were 85,105 people in the Tweed local government area, of these 48.2 per cent were male and 51.8 per cent were female. Aboriginal and Torres Strait Islander people made up 3.5 per cent of the population, which was significantly higher than the national and state averages of 2.5 per cent. The median age of people in the Tweed Shire area was 45 years, which was significantly higher than the national median of 37 years. Children aged 0 to 14 years made up 17.8 per cent of the population and people aged 65 years and over made up 22.9 per cent of the population. Of people in the area aged 15 years and over, 47.5 per cent were married and 15.3 per cent were either divorced or separated.

Population growth in the Tweed Shire area between the 2001 census and the 2006 census was 7.45 per cent; and in the subsequent five years to the 2011 census, population growth was 7.29 per cent. When compared with total population growth of Australia for the same periods, being 5.78 per cent and 8.32 per cent, respectively, population growth in the Tweed local government area was marginally higher than the national average. The median weekly income for residents within the Tweed Shire area was significantly lower than the national average.

At the 2011 census, the proportion of residents in the Tweed local government area who stated their ancestry as Australian or Anglo-Celtic exceeded 80 per cent of all residents (national average was 65.2 per cent). In excess of 59 per cent of all residents in the Tweed Shire nominated a religious affiliation with Christianity at the 2011 census, which was slightly higher than the national average of 50.2 per cent. Meanwhile, as at the census date, compared to the national average, households in the Tweed local government area had a significantly lower than average proportion (5.5 per cent) where two or more languages are spoken (national average was 20.4 per cent); and a significantly higher proportion (91.6 per cent) where English only was spoken at home (national average was 76.8 per cent).

Selected historical census data for the Tweed Shire local government area
Census year		2001	2006	2011
Population	Estimated residents on Census night	73,821	79,321	85,105
Population	LGA rank in terms of size within New South Wales			26
Population	% of New South Wales population			1.23%
Population	% of Australian population	0.39%	▲0.40%	0.40%
Cultural and language diversity				
Ancestry, top responses	English			31.9%
Ancestry, top responses	Australian			30.0%
Ancestry, top responses	Irish			9.8%
Ancestry, top responses	Scottish			8.0%
Ancestry, top responses	German			3.2%
Language, top responses (other than English)	German	0.4%	0.4%	0.4%
Language, top responses (other than English)	Italian	0.3%	0.3%	0.3%
Language, top responses (other than English)	French	n/c	▲0.2%	0.2%
Language, top responses (other than English)	Japanese	n/c	▲0.2%	0.2%
Language, top responses (other than English)	Spanish	n/c	n/c	▲0.2%
Religious affiliation				
Religious affiliation, top responses	Catholic	24.9%	▼24.7%	24.7%
Religious affiliation, top responses	Anglican	29.0%	▼26.1%	▼24.2%
Religious affiliation, top responses	No Religion	13.8%	▲17.6%	▲21.6%
Religious affiliation, top responses	Presbyterian and Reformed	5.9%	▼5.1%	▼4.9%
Religious affiliation, top responses	Uniting Church	6.0%	▼5.2%	▼4.5%
Median weekly incomes				
Personal income	Median weekly personal income		A$364	A$442
Personal income	% of Australian median income		78.1%	▼76.6%
Family income	Median weekly family income		A$904	A$1,045
Family income	% of Australian median income		77.2%	▼70.6%
Household income	Median weekly household income		A$683	A$845
Household income	% of Australian median income		66.5%	▼68.5%

=== Population ===
Year	Population	References
1911	9,514	
1921	15,136	
1933	17,099	
1947	19,321	
1954	21,144	
1961	22,491	
1966	23,154	
1976	27,526	
1981	40,050	
1986	45,690	
1991	55,857	
1996	66,519	
2001	74,577	
2006	83,089	
2011	85,105	
2016	91,371	

== Council ==
In May 2005, the Governor of New South Wales dismissed the Tweed Shire Council of Mayor Warren Polglase, following a public inquiry which found that the council was improperly influenced by developers involved in a property boom in the area. The inquiry was commissioned by the Minister for Local Government, Tony Kelly, following community concern about the way planning decisions were made. The Minister appointed the director-general of the Department of Local Government, Garry Payne, former Sydney Lord Mayor Lucy Turnbull and former Tweed Shire councillor, Max Boyd as Administrators for the ensuing three years.

=== Shire Presidents and Mayors ===
Councillor	Term of office	Title
C E Cox	1947–1948	Provisional President
A Buckley	1948–1949	President
C E Cox	1949–1957	President
Harold Lundberg	1957–1958	President
Clarrie Hall	1958–1959	President
Harold Lundberg	1959–1961	President
Clarrie Hall	1961–1963	President
Harold Lundberg	1963–1964	President
Clarrie Hall	1964–1973	President
Charles Jarvis	1973–1975	President
Clarrie Hall	1975–1979 died in office	President
Max Boyd	1979–1981	President
Mrs Y A M Rowse	1981–1984	President
Max Boyd	1984–1999	President/Mayor
Lynne Beck	1999–2001	Mayor
Warren Polglase	2001–2005	Mayor
Garry Payne	2005–2006	Administrator
Frank Willan	2006–2008	Administrator
Max Boyd	2005–2008	Administrator
Lucy Turnbull	2005–2007	Administrator
Garry Payne	2007–2008	Administrator
Joan van Lieshout	2008–2009	Mayor
Warren Polglase	2009–2010	Mayor
Kevin Skinner	2010–2011	Mayor
Barry Longland	2011–2014	Mayor
Gary Bagnall	2014–2015	Mayor
Katie Milne	2015–2020	Mayor
Chris Cherry	2020–present	Mayor

== Election results ==
=== 2024 ===
2024 New South Wales local elections: Tweed
Party	Candidate	Votes	%	±%
Liberal	1. James Owen (elected 1); 2. Rhiannon Brinsmead (elected 4); 3. Thomas O'Connor; 4. Freda Wilding	14,262	28.5	+3.6
Community Independents	1. Chris Cherry (elected 2); 2. Lindy Smith; 3. Julie Boyd; 4. Trevor White	7,574	15.1	+2.8
Labor	1. Reece Byrnes (elected 3); 2. Judith Choat; 3. Russell Logan; 4. Marie-Antoinette Rogers	7,235	14.5	+2.9
Bring Back Balance	1. Kimberly Hone (elected 5); 2. Warren Polglase; 3. David Allen; 4. Hannah Easton	5,801	11.6	+2.7
Greens	1. Nola Firth (elected 6); 2. Mary-Jayne Johnston; 3. Hilary Green; 4. Julianne Sandison	5,252	10.5	+1.2
Independent (Group I)	1. Meredith Dennis (elected 7); 2. Jennifer Hayes; 3. Gillian Cooper; 4. Zachary Hoade; 5. Edna Gorton	3,530	7.1	+1.7
Turner 4 Tweed	1. Brady Turner; 2. Dirk Brouwer; 3. Peter Waver; 4. Susan Mole	2,502	5.0	
All 4 Tweed	1. Colin Usher; 2. Belinda Dinsey; 3. Jerami Grassi; 4. Peter Sibilant	2,265	4.5	
Pryceless Tweed	1. Pryce Allsop; 2. Bill Larkin; 3. Paul Pouloudis	856	1.7	−4.6
Independent (Group D)	1. Ned Wales; 2. Kim Lloyd	382	0.8	
Animal Justice	Susie Hearder	141	0.3	
Independent	Mitch Dobbie	98	0.2	
Independent	James McKenzie	69	0.1	0.0
Animal Justice	Nicola Stone	32	0.1	
Animal Justice	Sheraden Robins	15	0.3	
Animal Justice	Clelia Valdez	14	0.0	
Animal Justice	Cheryl Tompson	12	0.0	
Total formal votes		50,040	91.7	
Informal votes		4,549	8.3	
Turnout		54,589	76.3	

=== 2016 ===
Elected councillor	Party
Katie Milne	Greens
Warren Polglase	Independent (Group A)
Pryce Allsop	Independent (Group H)
James Owen	Liberal
Reece Byrnes	Country Labor
Chris Cherry	Independent (Group B)
Ron Cooper	No High-Rise

2016 Tweed Shire Council election
Party	Candidate	Votes	%	±%
Independent (Group A)		7,336	15.45	
Greens		7,279	15.33	
Liberal		5,525	11.63	
Independent (Group H)		5,053	10.64	
Country Labor		4,970	10.46	
Independent (Group B)		2,821	5.94	
No High-Rise		2,028	4.27	
Independent (Group I)		1,956	4.21	
Independent (Group K)		1,690	3.56	
Independent (Group C)		1,551	3.27	
Dot Holdom Group		1,524	3.21	
Carolyn Byrne Group		1,369	2.88	
Independent (Group E)		1,364	2.87	
Independent (Group O)		1,159	2.44	
Independent (Group J)		1,158	2.44	
Independent	Dion Andrews	466	0.98	
Independent	Suzy Hudson	106	0.22	
Independent	Mathuranath Das	73	0.15	
Independent	James McKenzie	69	0.15	
Total formal votes		47,497	93.17	
Informal votes		3,482	6.83	
Turnout		50,979		
