= Yugambeh language =

Australian Aboriginal language

Yugambeh
- Minjungbal, Yugam
- Mibanah
- Region: Queensland, Australia
- Ethnicity: Yugambeh
- Native speakers: 208 (2021)
- Language family: Pama–Nyungan: Southeastern; North Coast; Bandjalangic; Yugambeh
- Dialects: Mananjahli (Wangerriburra); Minyangbal; Ngahnduwal; Nerang Creek

Language codes
- ISO 639-3: xjb
- Glottolog: twee1234
- AIATSIS: E17
- ELP: Minjungbal

Yugambeh speaker, Shaun Davies.

Yugambeh (or Mibanah, from Mibanah gulgun, lit. 'language of men' or 'sound of eagles'), also known as Tweed-Albert Bandjalang, is an Australian Aboriginal language spoken by the Yugambeh living in South-East Queensland between and within the Logan River basin and the Tweed River basin, bounded to the east by the Pacific Ocean (including South Stradbroke Island) and in the west by the Teviot Ranges and Teviot Brook basin.

Yugambeh is a dialect cluster of two mutually intelligible dialects, one of four such clusters of the Bandjalangic branch of the Pama–Nyungan language family.

== Name ==
In the Yugambeh language, the word yugambeh means an emphatic 'no', 'never' i.e. 'very much no' and is a common exonym for the people and their language. Speakers of the language use the word miban which means 'man', 'human', 'wedge-tailed eagle' and is the preferred endonym for the people; they call their language Mibanah meaning 'of man', 'of human', 'of eagle' (the -Nah suffix forming the genitive of the word miban).

Yugambeh may also be referred to as:

- Yugambir, Yugambeh (not to be confused with Yugambal/Yugumbal, a distinct language located further west)
- Yubumbee
- Jugumbir, Jukamba
- Tweed-Albert language
- Nganduwal
- Ngarangwal
- Manaldjali (a variant of Mununjali, the name of a Yugambeh-speaking clan)
- Minjanbal (probably from Minjungbal, an alternate language term)

== Geographic distribution ==
Yugambeh is spoken within the Logan, Albert, Coomera, Nerang, and Tweed River basins.

== Dialects ==
Linguists such as Margaret Sharpe, relying on the previous work of others like Terry Crowley, described the Yugambeh language as having potentially upwards of 7 dialects. Recent analysis has found errors in these original studies and when corrected for these errors, two mutually intelligible dialects can be found; a western (freshwater) variety and an eastern (saltwater) variety with minor vocabulary differences.

Some differences between the dialects as noted by linguist Shaun Davies:

English	Eastern	Western
she	nyahn	nyulegan
girl	yahgari	jabuny

== App ==
The Yugambeh Museum in Beenleigh currently maintains a free dictionary app for the Yugambeh language, available on Android, iOS and a desktop version.

== Phonology ==
=== Vowels ===
Yugambeh has a vowel system of four vowels that also contrast in length, resulting in eight phonemic vowels in total. The letter "h" is used after the vowel to indicate a long vowel.

	Front	Back
High	i iː	u uː
Mid	e eː	u uː
Low	a aː	

==== Allophones ====
The low central vowel /a/ is fronted and raised between palatal consonants and a lateral/rhotic consonant.

=== Consonants ===
Compared to other Pama-Nyungan languages, Yugambeh has a smaller inventory of consonants. There are four places of articulation, with the consonants consisting of four obstruents, four nasals, two liquids, and two semivowels.

	Peripheral		Laminal	Apical
	Bilabial	Velar	Palatal	Alveolar
Obstruent	p ⟨p⟩	k ⟨k⟩	c ⟨ť⟩	t ⟨t⟩
Nasal	m ⟨m⟩	ŋ ⟨g⟩	ɲ ⟨ň⟩	n ⟨n⟩
Lateral				l ⟨l⟩
Rhotic				ɾ ⟨r⟩
Semivowel	w ⟨w⟩		j ⟨j⟩	

==== Obstruents ====
Obstruents do not have a voicing contrast, and can appear as fricative allophones. Obstruents are phonetically voiceless, except when following a homorganic consonant.

== Grammar ==
The grammar of the Yugambeh language is highly agglutinative, making use of over 50 suffixes on nouns, verbs, adjectives, and demonstratives.

=== Noun morphology ===
Nouns take a number of suffixes to decline for grammatical case.

==== Suffixes ====
Noun suffixes are placed into ten orders. A noun may not take more than one suffix from any order, and if more than one suffix is attached they must always be in the set order of the suffix orders, e.g., an order 7 suffix must always come after an order 5 suffix.

Orders
1	2	3	4	5	6	7#	8	9	10
-gali Typified by	-gan Feminine	-bur Diminutive	-Nah Possessive	-jam Abessive	-bah Allative	-Xu Ergative, Instrumental, Comitative	-jahng Intensive	-ga Query	-ban 'also'
			-Nahjil Past Possessive			-Ni Objective			-gur Respective
						-gaia Benefactive			
						-gu Purposive			
						-gi Desiderative			
						-Nu Ablative			
						-Xah Locative			
						-Xih Past Locative			
						-nyi Aversive			

'X' stands for a homorganic obstruent.

'N' stands for a homorganic nasal.

#The comitative, purposive, desiderative, ablative, and aversive suffixes are preceded by -bah on animate nouns.

1. 1st order suffixes
  - -gali (typified by) – used to indicate an association or link
    - Examples:
      - Jinanggali 'shoe' lit. 'typified by foot'
      - Dubaygali 'womaniser' lit. 'typified by women'
2. 2nd order suffixes
  - -gan (feminine) – used to form feminine nouns and some astrological terms
    - Examples:
      - Yarabilngingan 'female singer'
3. 3rd order suffixes
  - -bur (diminutive) – used to form the diminutive of a noun, referring to a smaller version
    - Examples:
      - Baraganbur 'toy boomerang'
4. 4th order suffixes
  - -Nah (possessive) – indicates current possession
    - Examples:
      - Ngalingah 'our'
      - Gibamah 'of the moon/moon's'
  - -Nahjil (past possessive) – indicates past possession
    - Examples:
      - Bilinahjil 'was of the parrot' (Billinudgel)

=== Verb morphology ===
Verbs are conjugated with suffixes. Yugambeh is an aspect-dominant language, as opposed to being tense-dominant like most Western languages. Suffixes mostly indicate aspect and mood.

==== Suffixes ====
Verb suffixes are placed in six orders. A verb may not take more than one suffix from a given order, and similar to nouns, suffixes are attached in a set order. Combinations of these suffixes express all possible conjugations of Yugambeh verbs, with only a small number of combinations possible. Yugambeh verb stems are commonly two syllables in length and always end in a vowel.

Orders
1	2	3	4	5	6
-ba 'Causative'	-ndi 'Carry whilst...'	-li 'reflexive/passive'	-ja 'Past tense'	-hn 'imperfective aspect'	-du 'habitual aspect'
			-wa 'Repetitive'	-hny 'potential mood'	-i 'preconditional'
			-ma 'Causative'	-h 'imperative'	-de 'preconditional'
				-hla 'continuous aspect'	
				-nah 'antechronous aspect'	
				-nyun 'synchronous aspect'	
				-luru 'historical past'	
				-yan	
				-yah 'purposive'	
				-jin 'synchronous aspect'	
				-n 'permissive'	
				-ni 'perfective'	

=== Adjective morphology ===
Adjectives can be marked with a suffix to indicate the gender of the noun they qualify.

==== Suffixes ====
Adjective suffixes
Gender	Suffix
Animate (male)	-bin
Animate (female)	-gan
Arboreal	-Nahn*
Neuter	-gay

*N stands for a homorganic nasal.

=== Demonstratives ===
Yugambeh possesses a complicated set of demonstratives which make a three-way distinction among proximal, medial, and distal sets. There is a further distinguishing of demonstrative adjectives and location demonstratives. The adjective set can be additionally suffixed to create demonstrative pronouns. The adjective set has three forms for "things in sight", "things hidden or not in sight", and "things not there anymore", while the location set has forms to indicate the general area and definite area, whether in sight or not in sight, and past and present forms.

==== Adjective set ====
Demonstrative adjectives
Demonstratives	Proximal (this)	Medial (that)	Distal (that over there)
In sight (sg)	gali	mali	gili
In sight (plrl)	gahny	mahny	gahm
Not in sight (sg)	gunah	munah	gilah
Not in sight (plrl)	gunyeh	munyeh	gilyeh

The above set can be suffixed with order 7 noun suffixes to form demonstrative pronouns that function like ordinary independent nouns. e.g. Yanindeh galini wungahbaia! 'Take this with you!'

The 'not in sight' and 'not here anymore' forms can take the order 2 noun suffix -gan to form time words. e.g. gunahgan 'recently'.

==== Location set ====
Demonstratives	Proximal (here)	Medial (there)	Distal (over there)
In sight (definite area)	gaji	maji	guh
In sight (general area)	gunu	munu	gundeh
Not in sight (present)	gayu	mayu	guhyu
Not in sight (past)	gaye	maye	guhye

=== Syntax ===
Syntax in the Yugambeh language is fairly free, with a tendency towards SOV (subject–object–verb). Within noun phrases, adjectives and demonstratives (e.g., that man, a red car) stay adjacent to the noun they qualify.

== Place names ==
Modern place names with roots in the Yugambeh language include:

- Billinudgel – from bilinahjil, 'was of the parrot'
- Canungra – from gungunga, 'a long flat or clearing'
- Coomera/Upper Coomera – from kumera, a species of wattle
- Jumpinpi – Pandanus root
- Mundoolun – from Mundheralgun, the local name for the Common death adder
- Nindooinbah – from ninduinba, 'the remains of a fire'
- Pimpama – from pimpimba, 'a place of soldier birds'
- Tabragalba – from dhaberigaba, 'a place of clubs'
- Tallebudgera – rotten or decayed logs
- Wongawallan – from the words wonga ('pigeon') and wallan ('water')
