= Electoral district of Tweed =

State electoral district of New South Wales, Australia

Tweed New South Wales—Legislative Assembly
- Interactive map of district boundaries from the 2023 state election
- State: New South Wales
- Dates current: 1894–1904; 1999–present
- MP: Geoff Provest
- Party: National Party
- Namesake: Tweed River
- Electors: 57,646 (2023)
- Area: 511.33 km^{2} (197.4 sq mi)
- Demographic: Provincial and rural
Electorates around Tweed:
Mudgeeraba (QLD)	Currumbin (QLD)	Pacific Ocean
Lismore	Tweed	Pacific Ocean
Lismore	Ballina	Pacific Ocean

Tweed is an electoral district of the Legislative Assembly in the Australian state of New South Wales. It is represented by Geoff Provest of The Nationals. It is located in the Tweed Valley and eastern Tweed Shire, including Tweed Heads, Kingscliff, Fingal Head, Chinderah, Cudgen, Bogangar, Pottsville and Burringbar.

== History ==
Tweed was first created with the end of multi-member districts in 1894. In 1904, it was abolished with the reduction in the size of the Legislative Assembly, after Federation. The region was part of Richmond from 1904 to 1913, Byron from 1913 until 1988 when the district was renamed Murwillumbah. In 1999 the district was renamed Tweed.

== Members for Tweed ==
First incarnation (1894—1904)
Member	Party	Term
John Willard	Labor	1894–1894
Joseph Kelly	Protectionist	1894–1898
Richard Meagher	Independent	1898–1904
Second incarnation (1999—present)
Member	Party	Term
Neville Newell	Labor	1999–2007
Geoff Provest	National	2007–present

== Election results ==
2023 New South Wales state election: Tweed
Party	Candidate	Votes	%	±%
National	Geoff Provest	20,494	43.89	−3.66
Labor	Craig Elliot	14,425	30.90	−0.07
Greens	Ciara Denham	5,517	11.82	−2.03
Legalise Cannabis	Marc Selan	2,534	5.43	+5.43
Sustainable Australia	Ronald McDonald	2,298	4.92	+1.11
Animal Justice	Susie Hearder	1,422	3.05	−0.79
Total formal votes		46,690	96.33	+0.32
Informal votes		1,777	3.67	−0.32
Turnout		48,467	84.08	−1.27
Two-party-preferred result
National	Geoff Provest	22,075	53.58	−1.39
Labor	Craig Elliot	19,125	46.42	+1.39
National hold		Swing	−1.39	
