= Division of Richmond =

Australian federal electoral division

Coordinates: 28.511°S 153.363°E

Richmond Australian House of Representatives Division
- Interactive map of electorate boundaries from the 2025 federal election
- Created: 1901
- MP: Justine Elliot
- Party: Labor
- Namesake: Richmond River
- Electors: 126,908 (2025)
- Area: 2,133 km^{2} (823.6 sq mi)
- Demographic: Rural
Electorates around Richmond:
Wright (QLD)	McPherson (QLD)	Pacific Ocean
Page	Richmond	Pacific Ocean
Page	Page	Pacific Ocean

The Division of Richmond is an Australian electoral division in the state of New South Wales. It is the northeasternmost division in New South Wales, comprising settlements such as Ballina, Byron Bay and Tweed Heads on the Pacific coast south of the Queensland border.

Since 2004, its MP has been Justine Elliot of the Labor Party.

== History ==
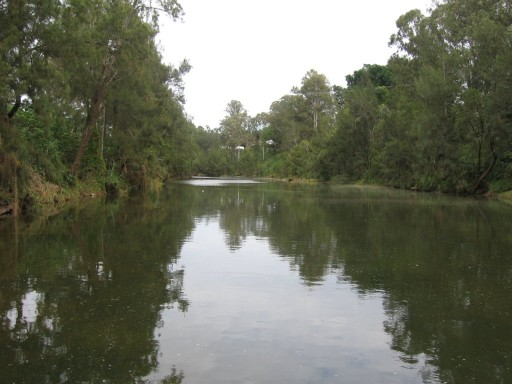
The Richmond River, the division's namesake

The division was proclaimed in 1900, and was one of the original 65 divisions to be contested at the first federal election. The division is named after the area in which it is located, namely the Richmond Valley and Richmond River, which was named in honour of Charles, the fifth Duke of Richmond.

Historically, the division has been a rural seat and fairly safe for the National Party (formerly called the Country Party), which held it for all but six years from 1922 to 2004. For 55 of those years, it was held by three generations of the Anthony family—Hubert Lawrence Anthony (a minister in the Fadden and Menzies governments), Doug Anthony (leader of the National Party from 1971 to 1984 and Deputy Prime Minister in the Gorton, McMahon and Fraser governments) and Larry Anthony (a minister in the Howard government)—the first three-generation dynasty in the Australian House of Representatives. However, it became far less safe for the Nationals from 1983 onward. It lost much of its territory to the new Division of Page in 1984, and strong population growth over the next three decades saw ot progressively lose almost all of its remaining rural territory and reduced it to a more coastal-based and urbanised division. Accompanying demographic change has made the seat friendlier to Labor since the 1990s. For most of the last 30 years, it has been one of the few areas of rural northern New South Wales where Labor usually does well.

The division's most notable member outside of the Anthony family was Charles Blunt, leader of the National Party from 1989 to 1990. His tenure was short-lived, however. Just months after becoming leader of the Nationals, he was defeated in the 1990 election when the preferences of anti-nuclear activist Helen Caldicott allowed Neville Newell to claim the seat for Labor for the first time ever, despite only winning 27 percent of first preferences. It was only the second time that a major party leader had lost his own seat in an election.

Larry Anthony (junior) regained the seat for the Nationals in 1996. However, despite his name recognition in the area, his hold on the seat was never as secure as those of his father and grandfather. He was defeated by Labor's Justine Elliot in 2004—the first time a member of the Anthony family had been unseated in an election. In 2007, Elliot picked up a large swing as Labor won government. She retained the seat at the 2010, 2013 and 2016 elections. The victory in 2013 came even as Labor lost government, marking the second time (her 2004 victory being the first) that the non-Labor parties have been in government without holding Richmond.

Richmond had the sixth highest vote for the Australian Greens, and saw the highest rural seat vote for the Greens in the nation. A redistribution ahead of the 2016 election pushed the seat to the south, into the area around Ballina. Much of this area is in the state seat of Ballina, which was taken by the Greens at the 2015 state election. At the 2019 election, the Greens won more booths on primary vote than Labor (Greens 20, Labor 9), although Labor won more total votes when including all booths.

== Boundaries ==
Since 1984, federal electoral division boundaries in Australia have been determined at redistributions by a redistribution committee appointed by the Australian Electoral Commission. Redistributions occur for the boundaries of divisions in a particular state, and they occur every seven years, or sooner if a state's representation entitlement changes or when divisions of a state are malapportioned.

The division is located in the far north-east of the state, adjacent to the Coral Sea. It adjoins the Queensland border to the north, and encompasses the towns of Ballina, Tweed Heads, Murwillumbah and Byron Bay.

== Members ==
Image	Member	Party	Term	Notes
	Sir Thomas Ewing (1856–1920)	Protectionist	29 March 1901 – 26 May 1909	Previously held the New South Wales Legislative Assembly seat of Lismore. Served as minister under Deakin. Retired
	Sir Thomas Ewing (1856–1920)	Liberal	26 May 1909 – 19 February 1910	Previously held the New South Wales Legislative Assembly seat of Lismore. Served as minister under Deakin. Retired
	Walter Massy-Greene (1874–1952)	Liberal	13 April 1910 – 17 February 1917	Served as Chief Government Whip in the House under Cook and Hughes. Served as minister under Hughes. Lost seat. Later appointed to the Senate in 1923
	Walter Massy-Greene (1874–1952)	Nationalist	17 February 1917 – 16 December 1922	Served as Chief Government Whip in the House under Cook and Hughes. Served as minister under Hughes. Lost seat. Later appointed to the Senate in 1923
	Roland Green (1885–1947)	Country	16 December 1922 – 23 October 1937	Lost seat
	Hubert Lawrence Anthony (1897–1957)	Country	23 October 1937 – 12 July 1957	Served as minister under Menzies and Fadden. Died in office. Son is Doug Anthony and grandson is Larry Anthony
	Doug Anthony (1929–2020)	Country	14 September 1957 – 2 May 1975	Served as minister under Menzies, Holt, McEwen, Gorton, McMahon and Fraser. Served as Deputy Prime Minister under Gorton, McMahon and Fraser. Resigned to retire from politics. Father was Hubert Lawrence Anthony and son is Larry Anthony
	Doug Anthony (1929–2020)	National Country	2 May 1975 – 16 October 1982	Served as minister under Menzies, Holt, McEwen, Gorton, McMahon and Fraser. Served as Deputy Prime Minister under Gorton, McMahon and Fraser. Resigned to retire from politics. Father was Hubert Lawrence Anthony and son is Larry Anthony
	Doug Anthony (1929–2020)	Nationals	16 October 1982 – 18 January 1984	Served as minister under Menzies, Holt, McEwen, Gorton, McMahon and Fraser. Served as Deputy Prime Minister under Gorton, McMahon and Fraser. Resigned to retire from politics. Father was Hubert Lawrence Anthony and son is Larry Anthony
	Charles Blunt (1951–)	Nationals	18 February 1984 – 24 March 1990	Served as leader of the National Party from 1989 to 1990. Lost seat
	Neville Newell (1952–)	Labor	24 March 1990 – 2 March 1996	Lost seat. Later elected to the New South Wales Legislative Assembly seat of Tweed in 1999
	Larry Anthony (1961–)	Nationals	2 March 1996 – 9 October 2004	Served as minister under Howard. Lost seat. Grandfather was Hubert Lawrence Anthony and father is Doug Anthony
	Justine Elliot (1967–)	Labor	9 October 2004 – present	Served as minister under Rudd and Gillard. Incumbent

== Election results ==
2025 Australian federal election: Richmond
Party	Candidate	Votes	%	±%
Labor	Justine Elliot	31,901	30.40	+1.60
Greens	Mandy Nolan	27,783	26.47	+1.20
National	Kimberly Hone	25,795	24.58	+1.23
One Nation	Ian Mye	5,709	5.44	+1.36
Legalise Cannabis	Vivian Mac McMahon	3,998	3.81	+3.81
People First	Richard Curtin	3,364	3.21	+3.21
Trumpet of Patriots	Phillip Peterkin	2,052	1.96	+1.96
Independent	Kevin Loughrey	1,754	1.67	+1.67
Libertarian	Ian Cherry Willis	1,619	1.54	−6.16
Independent	James Ian McKenzie	977	0.93	+0.93
Total formal votes		104,952	92.43	−0.65
Informal votes		8,600	7.57	+0.65
Turnout		113,552	89.54	+3.24
Two-party-preferred result
Labor	Justine Elliot	62,975	60.00	+1.77
National	Kimberly Hone	41,977	40.00	−1.77
Labor hold		Swing	+1.77	
