= Lynwood, New South Wales =

Rural locality in New South Wales, Australia

Lynwood New South Wales
- Coordinates: 28°52′14″S 153°26′34″E
- Population: 228 (2016 census)
- Postcode(s): 2477
- LGA(s): Ballina Shire
- State electorate(s): Ballina
- Federal division(s): Page
Localities around Lynwood:
	Alstonville	Teven
Rous	Lynwood	Uralba
Dalwood	Meershaum Vale	Coolgardie

Lynwood is a rural locality located in the Northern Rivers Region of New South Wales. It had a population of 228 in the 2016 census.
