= Tintenbar Shire =

Former local government area in New South Wales, Australia

Tintenbar Shire New South Wales
- Established: 7 March 1906
- Abolished: 1 January 1977
- Council seat: Alstonville
- Region: Northern Rivers

Tintenbar Shire was a local government area in the Northern Rivers region of New South Wales, Australia.

Tintenbar Shire was proclaimed on 7 March 1906, one of 134 shires created after the passing of the Local Government (Shires) Act 1905.

The shire offices were in Alstonville. Other towns and villages in the shire included Lennox Head, Tintenbar and Wardell.

Tintenbar Shire was amalgamated with the Municipality of Ballina to form Ballina Shire on 1 January 1977.
