= South Ballina, New South Wales =

South Ballina Ballina, New South Wales
- Coordinates: 28°53′6″S 153°34′12″E
- Population: 27 (2021 census)
- Postcode(s): 2478
- LGA(s): Ballina Shire
- State electorate(s): Ballina
- Federal division(s): Richmond

South Ballina is a locality located in the Northern Rivers Region of New South Wales - bounded by the Richmond River to the north, the Tasman Sea (Pacific Ocean) to the east, and Keith Hall to the south and west. Across the river to the north, is the town of Ballina and it is a popular spot for recreational fishing. It is on the lands of the Bundjalung Nation and it falls within the Jali Aboriginal Land Council.

A large part of South Ballina is made up of the Richmond River Nature Reserve which was created in June 1986 and covers a land area of 256 hectares. This reserve contains significant wetland and coastal vegetation communities and is a significant habitat for coastal birds with over 160 bird species being identified within the reserve, 22 of these shorebird species are protected under international conservation agreements. The reserve is of great significance to the Bundjalung people and contains middens and open campsites.

It is accessible directly to Ballina via the Burns Point Ferry, a vehicular cable ferry, which crosses the Richmond River from Burns Point Ferry Road in West Ballina and River Drive in South Ballina. This crossing is 300 metres in length and has been in operation since 1891.

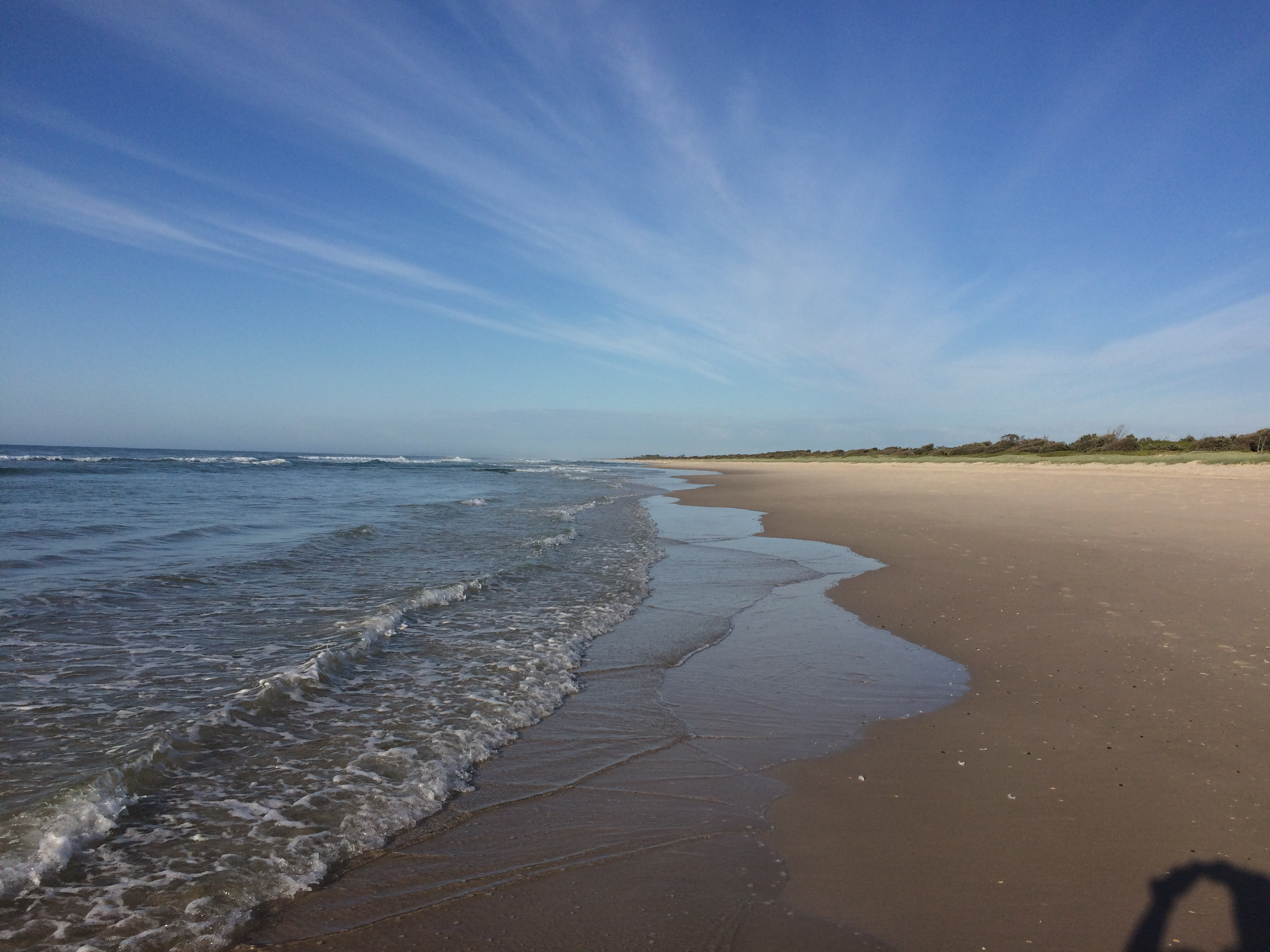
South Ballina Beach (looking south), April 2019

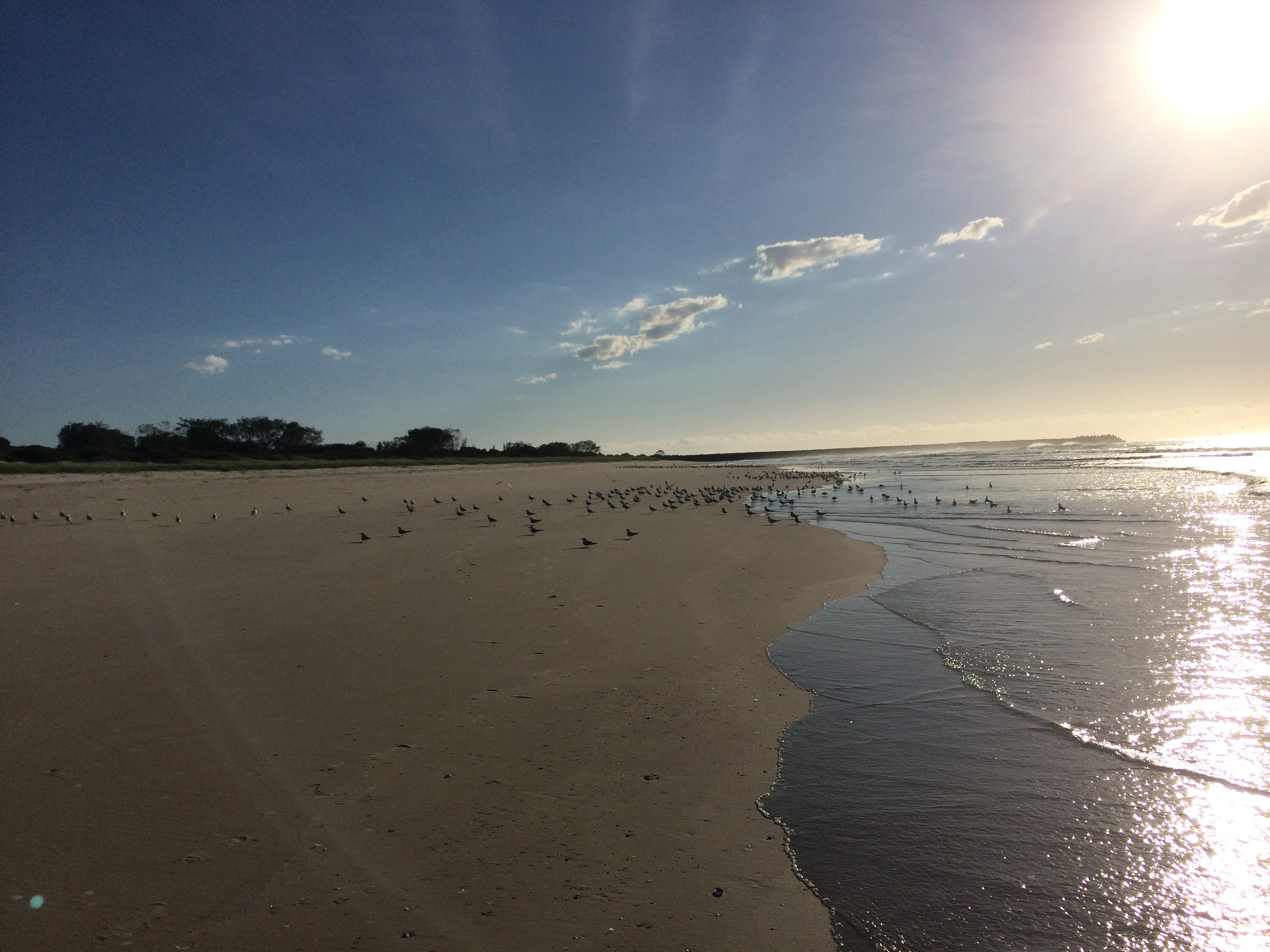
South Ballina Beach looking north, April 2019. The Southern Breakwall of the Richmond River can be seen in the distance.

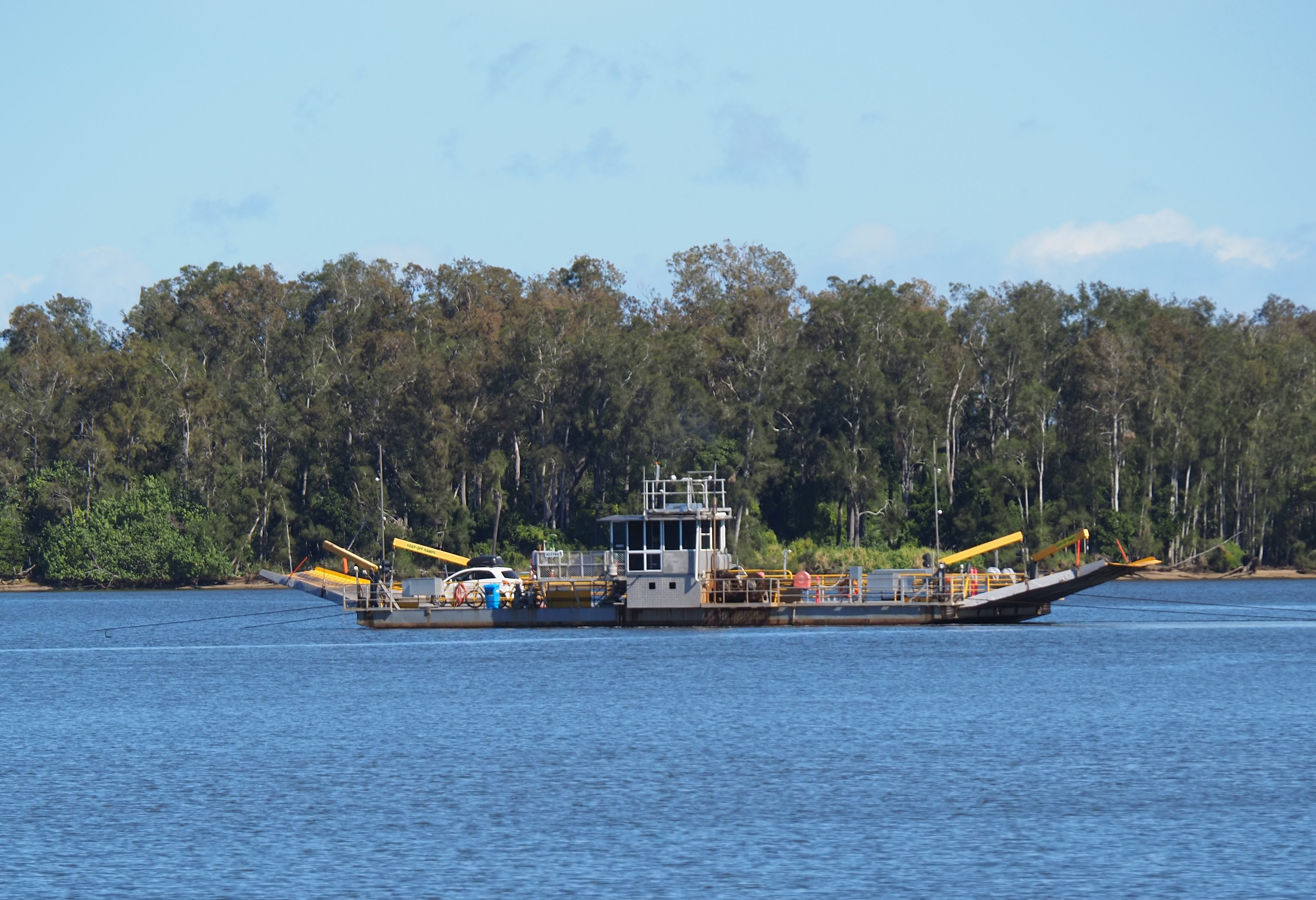
The Burns Point Ferry, Richmond River, NSW, August 2025

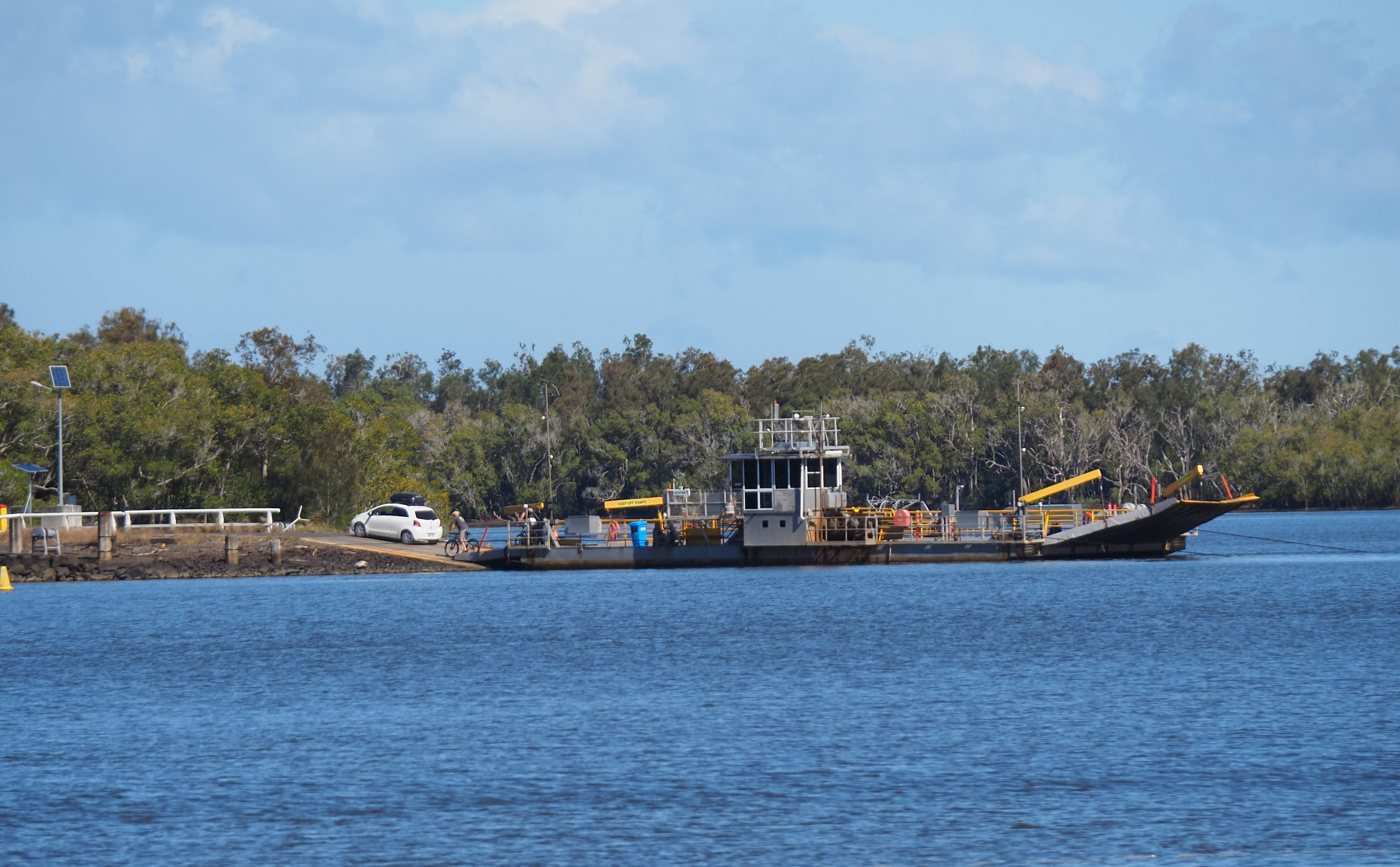
The Burns Point Ferry discharging vehicles at South Ballina, August 2025

== Demographics ==
As of the 2021 Australian census, 27 people resided in South Ballina, down from 37 in the 2016 census. The median age of persons in South Ballina was 56 years. There were more males than females, with 60.0% of the population male and 40.0% female. The average household size was 1.7 people per household.

== History ==
In the 1860s the sugar industry became established along the Richmond River and much of South Ballina was cleared and drained for sugar cane production, with the exception of the land which contains the reserve, From the 1960s there was also mineral sand mining in the area which severely modified the vegetation and landforms in the area. Sand mining is still taking place at the South Ballina Sand Quarry (which is still in operation).
