= Marom Creek, New South Wales =

Marom Creek New South Wales
- Coordinates: 28°54′11″S 153°22′27″E
- Population: 127 (2016 census)
- Postcode(s): 2480
- LGA(s): Ballina Shire; City of Lismore
- State electorate(s): Ballina
- Federal division(s): Page

Marom Creek is a small town located in the Northern Rivers Region of New South Wales, Australia and it sits within the Ballina Shire local government area. It is situated 32 kilometres (20 mi) from the regional centre of Ballina.

It is on the lands of the Bundjalung people, who are the traditional owners of this area.

== Origin of place name ==
The name Marom comes from the Bundjalung language word, which was also spelt 'Miram', which is both a word for the chest or stomach, or the word for alive or something like madam; a respectful for address when talking to an older woman. Marom is also similar to another Bundjalung ward 'Mahr' which means duck.
