= Teven, New South Wales =

Teven New South Wales
- Coordinates: 28°49′0″S 153°30′0″E
- Population: 250 (2011 census)
  - Density: 7.72/km^{2} (20.0/sq mi)
- Postcode(s): 2478
- Area: 32.4 km^{2} (12.5 sq mi)
- Location: 12 km (7 mi) from Ballina; 750 km (466 mi) from Sydney
- LGA(s): Ballina Shire
Localities around Teven:
	Tintenbar	Lennox Head
Alstonville	Teven	Ballina
Uralba	Pimlico	West Ballina

Teven is a village located on the Far North Coast of New South Wales (in Australia).

Administratively it is part of the Ballina Shire. It is located about 12 kilometres (7.5 mi) or 9 minutes car drive north-west from Ballina along the Pacific Highway. Sydney, the state capital, is located approximately 750 kilometres (470 mi) or 8.5 hours car drive south from Teven.

== Demographics ==
In the 2011 census, Teven is represented as a State suburb (SSC 12250). There were 250 usual residents living in Teven. Of this count, 130 (or 52%) were males and 120 (or 48%) were females. The median age for persons living in Teven was 44 years. By age, 20% of the population were under 15 years old, 75% were between 15 and 65, and 5% were over 65 years old. Most people living in Teven were born in Australia (85%).

=== Economy ===
According to the 2011 census, the median individual income was $510 per week. The median family income was $1,083 per week and the median household income in 2006 was $1,228 per week.

There were 134 people employed in 2011 (to give an employment to working age population ratio of 0.73), and 5 people unemployed. The most common occupations were Managers (21%); Technicians and Trade Workers (20%); and, Labourers (15%). The top 5 industries for employment were Fruit and Tree Nut Growing (12%), Sheep, Beef Cattle and Grain Farming (5%), Supermarket and Grocery Stores (4%), School Education (4%) and Adult, Community and Other Education (4%).

=== Housing ===
In the 2011 census, the median housing loan repayment was $1,517 per month. This equated to marginally under 29% of median household income. The median rent was $190 per week. This equated to just over 15% of median household income. The average household size was 3 persons.

== Recreation ==
Teven Valley Golf Course is located in Teven. Land at the confluence of Houghlahans Creek and Maguires Creek was purchased in 2016 by Ballina Shire Council to re-establish native riparian vegetation and provide for recreation.
