= McLeans Ridges, New South Wales =

McLeans Ridges New South Wales
- Coordinates: 28°47′54″S 153°23′04″E
- Population: 510 (2016 census)
- Postcode(s): 2480
- LGA(s): Ballina Shire
- State electorate(s): Ballina
- Federal division(s): Page

McLeans Ridges is a locality located in the Northern Rivers Region of New South Wales.
