= Tintenbar, New South Wales =

Tintenbar
- Town
- Coordinates: 28°48′0″S 153°31′0″E
- Country: Australia
- State: New South Wales
- LGA: Ballina Shire
- Location: 12 km (7.5 mi) from Ballina; 750 km (470 mi) from Sydney

Area
  - Total: 21.7 km^{2} (8.4 sq mi)
- Elevation: 16 m (52 ft)

Population
  - Total: 822 (2016 census)
  - Density: 36/km^{2} (93/sq mi)
- Postcode: 2478
Localities around Tintenbar
	Nashua
Eltham	Tintenbar	Brooklet
Wollongbar	Alstonville	Teven

Tintenbar is a village located on the Far North Coast of New South Wales, Australia.

Administratively it is part of the Ballina Shire. It is located about 12 kilometres (7.5 mi) or a 9-minute car drive north-west from Ballina on the Pacific Highway.

Over the past two decades the population of Tintenbar has increased dramatically. This has principally been the result of three large estates being constructed (Norfolk Park Estate, Oatley Park Estate, and Phoenix Park Estate). As of 2016 it has grown to 822 usual residents in an area of 21.7 kilometres^{2} – giving an average population density of 36 people per square kilometre.

== Demographics ==
In the 2011 census of Population and Housing, Tintenbar is represented as a "state suburb" (SSC12283). There were 822 usual residents living in Tintenbar. This was higher than the 587 population in the 2006 Census. Of this count, 422 were males and 402 were females (numbers don't sum to total). The median age for persons living in Tintenbar was 45 years, compared to the national median of 38. By age, 20% of the population were under 15 years old, 61% were between 15 and 65, and 19% were over 65 years old. Most people living in Tintenbar were born in Australia (74%).

=== Economy ===
According to the 2011 census of Population and Housing, the median individual income was $550 per week. The median family income was $1,608 per week. There were 383 people who reported as being in the labour force, of whom 18 were unemployed. The most common occupations were Professionals 21.3%, Managers 16.1%, Technicians and Trades Workers 16.1%. The top industries for employment were School Education (4.4%), Cafes, Restaurants and Takeaway Food Services (3.8%), Legal and Accounting Services (3.3%), Residential Building Construction (3.0%) and Architectural, Engineering and Technical Services (2.7%).

=== Housing ===
In the 2011 census of Population and Housing, the median housing loan repayment was $1,900 per month. The median rent was $300 per week. The average household size was 2.8 people.

== Commerce ==
Tintenbar has one general store (Tintenbar store), a restaurant (Che bon), a pharmacy (Tintenbar pharmacy), an art studio (David Lane's Studio), and a medical centre.

== Environment ==
Tintenbar is a rural area that has many environmental features. It is surrounded by the localities of Knockrow to the north, Fernleigh and Brooklet to the north-west, Teven to the South-West, Cumbalum to the South, and Lennox Head to the East.

There are several creeks that flow through Tintenbar. The major one is called Emigrant creek. This flows into Killen Falls which is a waterfall that is a popular tourist destination.

In February 2013 after a local survey of the community, Tintenbar declared itself Coal Seam Gas Free.

== Culture ==
Tintenbar has a multi-purpose hall, newly renovated, located just off the old Pacific Highway.

== Transport ==
Tintenbar has a major highway that crosses through it, called the Pacific Highway.

The Tintenbar-end of the Pacific Highway upgrade was completed in early 2011. An entrance and exit is now provided near the old Ross Lane entrance. The upgrade means the highway is now further east than the old highway (now renamed Tamarind Drive), is much straighter, and is dual carriageway with bicycle lanes on either side. The highway was upgraded due to sharp corners which led to several traffic accidents, particularly around Tintenbar Hill.

Previously the Pacific Highway ran along Bangalow Road to Tintenbar along Emigrant Creek. This was changed in 1939.

There is no public transport in Tintenbar. There are some bus routes that are run to transport children to primary and high schools.

== Sport and sporting amenities ==
Tintenbar has an oval and tennis courts. These are for hire from the General Store.

Tintenbar is a catchment area for the Tintenbar East Ballina Cricket Club.

== Education ==
There is one primary school in Tintenbar. It is named the Teven-Tintenbar public school. The school is located in Fredricks lane near the boundary with the village of Teven.

Teven-Tintenbar public school was created in 1988 and is the result of an amalgamation of the Tintenbar and the Teven public schools.

There are no high schools or higher education facilities in Tintenbar. The nearest high school is Ballina High School, and the closest university is the Southern Cross University.

== Communications ==
Tintenbar has a relatively good communications system. Almost every dwelling has access to the copper wire land-line network. Recently Digital Subscriber Line (DSL) was made available to the area by the upgrade of the Tintenbar exchange (located on the Pacific Highway).

The Telstra Next-G network has good signal near the Pacific Highway. Internet is typically faster than DSL but is generally more expensive per GigaByte downloaded.

== History ==
Tintenbar lies at the southern end of the Big Scrub rainforest, which attracted European settlers in the mid-1850s. It then emerged as a permanent settlement for timber-getting and in the 1880s, it was proclaimed a village.

=== History of Tintenbar Public School ===
The Tintenbar public school had a long history stretching back over 100 years. Initially the school was located near the centre of the village. In February 1884 that the school was opened, Miss Ellen Duffy was the first teacher. It was in the vicinity of a Church of England, a cooper's store, a hotel (Royal Hotel), and a blacksmith's shop.

== Opals ==
In 1901, opals were first discovered at Tintenbar. Mining for opals was conducted between 1919 and 1922.

== Notable residents ==
- William Gillies (Australian politician) – Former Premier of Queensland
- Susie Olive Kaylock (1892–1959), Local government official and community worker, was born here
