= Meerschaum Vale, New South Wales =

Town in Australia

Meerschaum Vale
- Town
- Coordinates: 28°44′21″S 153°30′10″E
- Country: Australia
- State: New South Wales
- LGA: Ballina Shire

Government
  - State electorate: Ballina
  - Federal division: Page

Population
  - Total: 397 (2016 census)
- Postcode: 2477

Meerschaum Vale is a town in the Northern Rivers region of New South Wales, Australia.
