= Newrybar, New South Wales =

Town in New South Wales, Australia

Newrybar
- Town
- Coordinates: 28°43′20″S 153°31′52″E
- Country: Australia
- State: New South Wales
- LGA: Ballina Shire Byron Shire

Government
  - State electorate: Ballina
  - Federal division: Richmond
- Elevation: 123 m (404 ft)

Population
  - Total: 532 (2021 census)
- Postcode: 2479

Newrybar is a small historic village located in the Northern Rivers Region of New South Wales; it is 16 kms south of Byron Bay. It is on the lands of the Bundjalung people.

The town's name appears to have been derived from a Yugambeh–Bundjalung words, "Nury" or "Nurybar", which mean 'climbing vine' or 'the places where vines grow'.

At the 2021 census, it had a permanent population of 532.

== History ==
Newrybar was first settled by Europeans in 1881 and many farmers moved to the area. Some of the first constructed buildings were a general store, a tinsmith and tailor, the Presbyterian Church and the Newrybar Public School. Some of these earliest buildings remain intact.

One of these buildings is the Newrybar Community Hall, previously the Newrybar School of Arts, which was built in 1899 and is used for community functions and events. Each Wednesday it hosts the Newyrbar Eats and Produce Markets.

== Demographics ==
As of the 2021 Australian census, 532 people resided in Newrybar, up from 444 in the 2016 census. The median age of persons in Newrybar was 47 years. There were more males than females, with 50.6% of the population male and 49.4% female. The average household size was 2.6 people per household.
