= Tuckombil, New South Wales =

Rural locality in New South Wales, Australia

Tuckombil
- Town
- Coordinates: 28°48′54″S 153°28′04″E
- Country: Australia
- State: New South Wales
- LGA: Ballina Shire

Government
  - State electorate: Ballina
  - Federal division: Richmond

Population
  - Total: 259 (2016 census)
- Postcode: 2477

Tuckombil is a locality located in the Northern Rivers Region of New South Wales. It is located in the Ballina Shire local government area and it is located 18.5 kilometres (11.5 mi) west of the regional centre of Ballina. and 5.5 kilometres (3.4 mi) north-west of Alstonville.

== Origin of place name ==
The name is derived from the Bundjalung language and either means 'junction of two creeks' or 'salt-water/creek'.
