= Bagotville, New South Wales =

Bagotville
- Town
- Coordinates: 28°58′30″S 153°24′23″E
- Country: Australia
- State: New South Wales
- LGAs: Ballina Shire; City of Lismore

Government
  - State electorate: Ballina
  - Federal division: Page

Population
  - Total: 60 (2021 census)
- Postcode: 2477

Bagotville is a small town located in the Northern Rivers Region of New South Wales. It sits within the Ballina Shire local government area and it is 27 kilometres (17 mi) south-west of the regional centre of Ballina and 5 kilometres (3.1 mi) from Wardell.

== Origin of place name ==
Bagotville is named after the Bagot brothers, including John Bagot, who built a sawmill in the locality. This later burnt down and was rebuilt in Wardell and later Ballina in around 1900.

== Demographics ==
As of the 2021 Australian census, 60 people resided in Bagotville, up from 49 in the 2016 census. The median age of persons in Bagotville was 50 years. There were more males than females, with 57.6% of the population male and 42.4% female. The average household size was 2.4 people per household.
