= Bruxner Highway =

State highway in New South Wales, Australia

Bruxner Highway Bruxner Way New South Wales
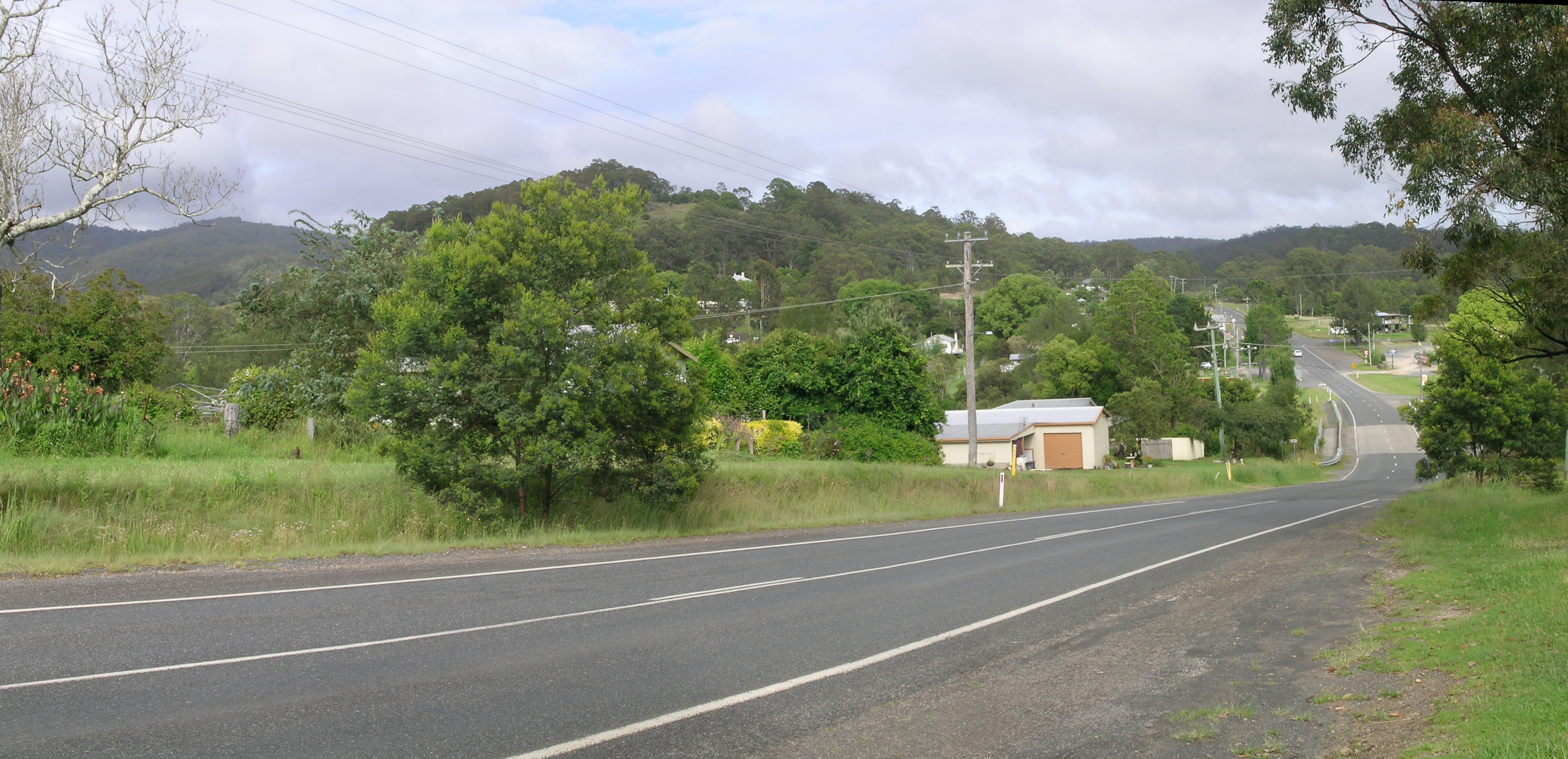
- Bruxner Highway at Drake, 2010

General information
- Type: Highway
- Length: 420 km (261 mi)
- Gazetted: August 1928 (as Main Road 64); March 1938 (as State Highway 16)
- Route number(s): B60 (2013–present) (Tenterfield–West Ballina)
- Former route number: National Route 44 (1974–2013) (Tenterfield–West Ballina)

Major junctions
Bruxner Way
- West end: Newell Highway; Boggabilla, New South Wales
- Warialda Road
- East end: New England Highway; Tenterfield, New South Wales
Bruxner Highway
- West end: New England Highway; Tenterfield, New South Wales
- Summerland Way; Bangalow Road
- East end: Pacific Highway; West Ballina, New South Wales

Location(s)
- Major settlements: Yetman, Bonshaw, Tenterfield, Drake, Tabulam, Casino, Lismore, Alstonville

Highway system
- Highways in Australia; National Highway • Freeways in Australia; Highways in New South Wales

The Bruxner Highway, and its former western alignment, now called Bruxner Way, are a 420-kilometre (260 mi) state highway and rural road respectively, located in New South Wales, Australia. The route forms an east–west link across the Northern Tablelands in northern New South Wales, close to the border with Queensland, to the Northern Rivers coast. It was named after Michael Bruxner, NSW Minister for Transport from 1932 to 1941.

== Route ==
Bruxner Way commences at the intersection with Newell Highway in Boggabilla and heads in a south-easterly direction, tracking close to the southern bank of the Macintyre River until it reaches Yetman, then heads east where it reaches the turn-off to Texas (just across the border in Queensland), then continues in an easterly direction, tracking close to the southern bank of the Dumaresq River and Tenterfield Creek until it eventually terminates at an intersection with New England Highway just north of Tenterfield. The Bruxner Highway commences at the intersection with Newell Highway in central Tenterfield and continues in an easterly direction through Tabulam until it reaches Casino, where it meets Summerland Way. The highway continues east through Lismore and Alstonville until eventually terminating at an interchange with Pacific Highway in West Ballina.

The speed limit along the Bruxner Highway is mostly 100 km/h, with 80 km/h limits on winding sections and 50 km/h limits in urban areas. The speed limit is 60 km/h through the Lismore urban area with a high volume of traffic. There is a speed camera in the 80 km/h section near the Lismore City and Ballina Shire boundary.

== History ==
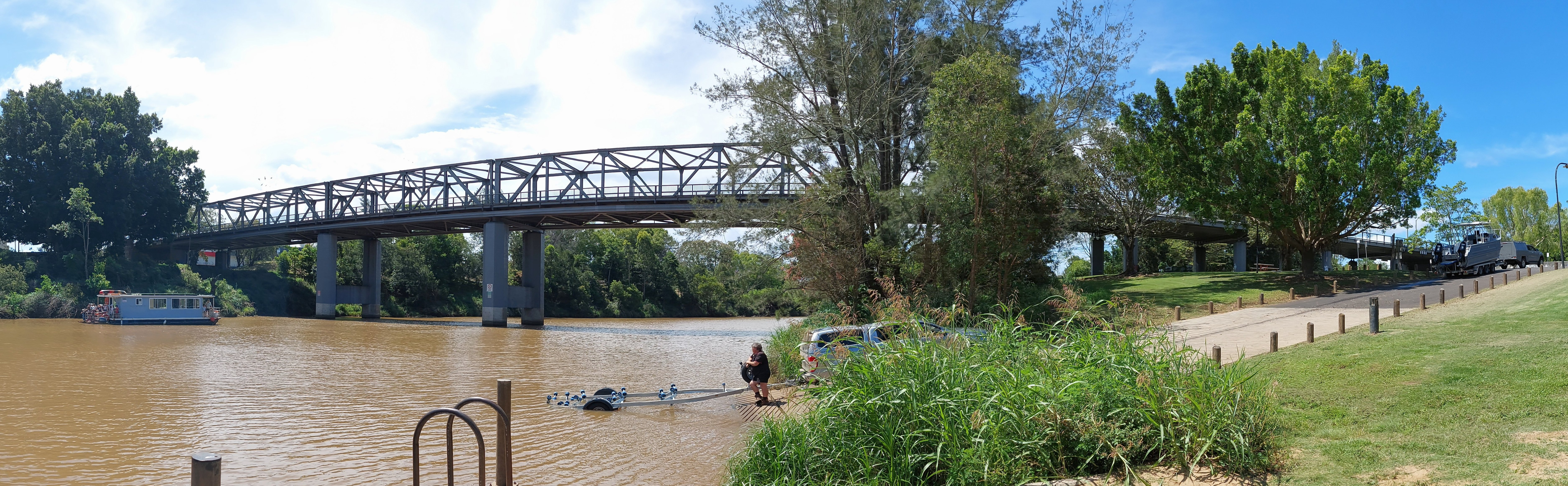
Ballina St. road bridge, carrying the Bruxner Highway across the Wilsons River at Lismore (panorama), 2023

The passing of the Main Roads Act of 1924 through the Parliament of New South Wales provided for the declaration of Main Roads, roads partially funded by the State government through the Main Roads Board (later Transport for NSW).

Main Road No. 63 was declared from Yetman to Boggabilla (and continuing northwards to the state border with Queensland at Goondiwindi, and southwards via Warialda and Bingara to the intersection with Great Northern Highway, today New England Highway, at Tamworth, Main Road No. 64 was declared from the intersection with North Coast Highway (today the Pacific Highway) at Ballina, via Lismore and Casino to the intersection with Great Northern Highway at Tenterfield, and Main Road No. 138 was declared from Tenterfield via Bonshaw to the state border with Queensland at Texas. With the passing of the Main Roads (Amendment) Act of 1929 to provide for additional declarations of State Highways and Trunk Roads, they were amended to Trunk Roads 63 and 64 and Main Road 138 on 8 April 1929. Main Road 138 was later extended westwards from Texas to meet Trunk Road 63 at Yetman, with a branch to the state border with Queensland at Texas, on 22 January 1935.

The Department of Main Roads, which had succeeded the MRB in 1932, declared State Highway 16 on 16 March 1938, from the intersection with the Pacific Highway at Ballina via Lismore, Casino, Tabluam, Tenterfield, Bonshaw, Yetman and Boggabilla to the state border with Queensland at Goondiwindi, subsuming Trunk Road 64, and most of Main Road 138 from Yetman to Tenterfield; the southern end of Trunk Road 63 was truncated to meet the Bruxner Highway at Yetman, and Main Road 138 was truncated from the bridge over the Dumaresq River at Texas to the intersection with the Bruxner Highway as a result. State Highway 16 was named Bruxner Highway on 2 November 1959, in honour of Sir Michael Bruxner, member for Northern Tablelands and Tenterfield from 1920 to 1962, leader of the New South Wales Country Party for almost all that period and Deputy Premier and Minister for Transport from 1932 to 1941.

The Roads Act of 1993 updated road classifications and the way they could be declared within New South Wales. Under the act, on 23 April 2010, the declaration of Highway 16 from West Ballina was truncated at Tenterfield, and Main Road 462 was declared along the former alignment from Tenterfield via Bonshaw and Yetman to Boggabilla. Main Road 462 was named Bruxner Way in 2011, but much of the road is still signed as the Bruxner Highway, and there are few signs denoting its new identity. The Bruxner Highway retains its declaration as Highway 16, from the intersection with New England Highway in Tenterfield to the intersection with Pacific Highway in West Ballina.

The Bruxner Highway between Ballina and Tenterfield was designated as National Route 44 in 1974. It was intended that National Route 44 would continue to Boggabilla to meet with the Newell Highway, but that part of the highway was never designated as National Route 44. With the conversion to the alphanumeric road identification system in 2013, that became route B60 between Ballina and Tenterfield.

=== Upgrades ===
At Alstonville, a 6.5km-long bypass was completed in 2010 at the cost of $44 million. There is a proposal for a fully duplicated highway from the interchange with Pacific Highway to Lismore Airport.

== Major intersections ==
LGA	Location	km	mi	Destinations	Notes
Moree Plains	Boggabilla	0	0.0	Newell Highway (A39) – Moree, Goondiwindi	Western terminus of Bruxner Way at T-intersection
Moree Plains	Boggabilla	7.9	4.9	Boggabilla–Warialda Road – North Star, Warialda	
Inverell	Yetman	60.4	37.5	Warialda Road – Warialda, Inverell	
Inverell	Bebo	101	63	Texas Road – Texas	
Inverell	Bonshaw	130	81	Inverell–Bonshaw Road – Ashford, Inverell	
Tenterfield	Tenterfield	230	140	New England Highway (A15 north) – Stanthorpe, Warwick	Eastern terminus of Bruxner Way
Gap in route
Tenterfield	Tenterfield	235	146	Rouse Street (New England Highway) (A15 south) – Glen Innes, Tamworth	Western terminus of highway and route B60
Clarence River		306	190	Tabulam Bridge	
Kyogle	Tabulam	314	195	Clarence Way – Baryulgil, Grafton	
Richmond Valley	Casino	361	224	Centre Street (Summerland Way) (B91 south) – Grafton	Roundabout; southern terminus of concurrency with route B91
Richmond River		362	225	Irving Bridge	
Richmond Valley	Casino	363	226	Johnston Street (Summerland Way) (B91 north) – Kyogle, Woodenbong	Roundabout; northern terminus of concurrency with route B91
Lismore	South Lismore	391	243	Union Street (north), to Nimbin Road – Nimbin; Elliot Road (west) – South Lismore	Roundabout
Wilsons River		392	244	Ballina Street Bridge	
Lismore	Lismore	393	244	Dawson Street, to Bangalow Road (B62) – Clunes, Bangalow, Byron Bay	Roundabout
Ballina	West Ballina	420	260	River Street – Ballina	Roundabout interchange
Ballina	West Ballina	420	260	Pacific Highway (A1) – Brisbane, Grafton, Coffs Harbour, Sydney	Eastern terminus of highway and route B60
1.000 mi = 1.609 km; 1.000 km = 0.621 mi: Concurrency terminus; Route transition

== See also ==
- Highways in Australia
- Highways in New South Wales
