= Ballina Byron Gateway Airport =

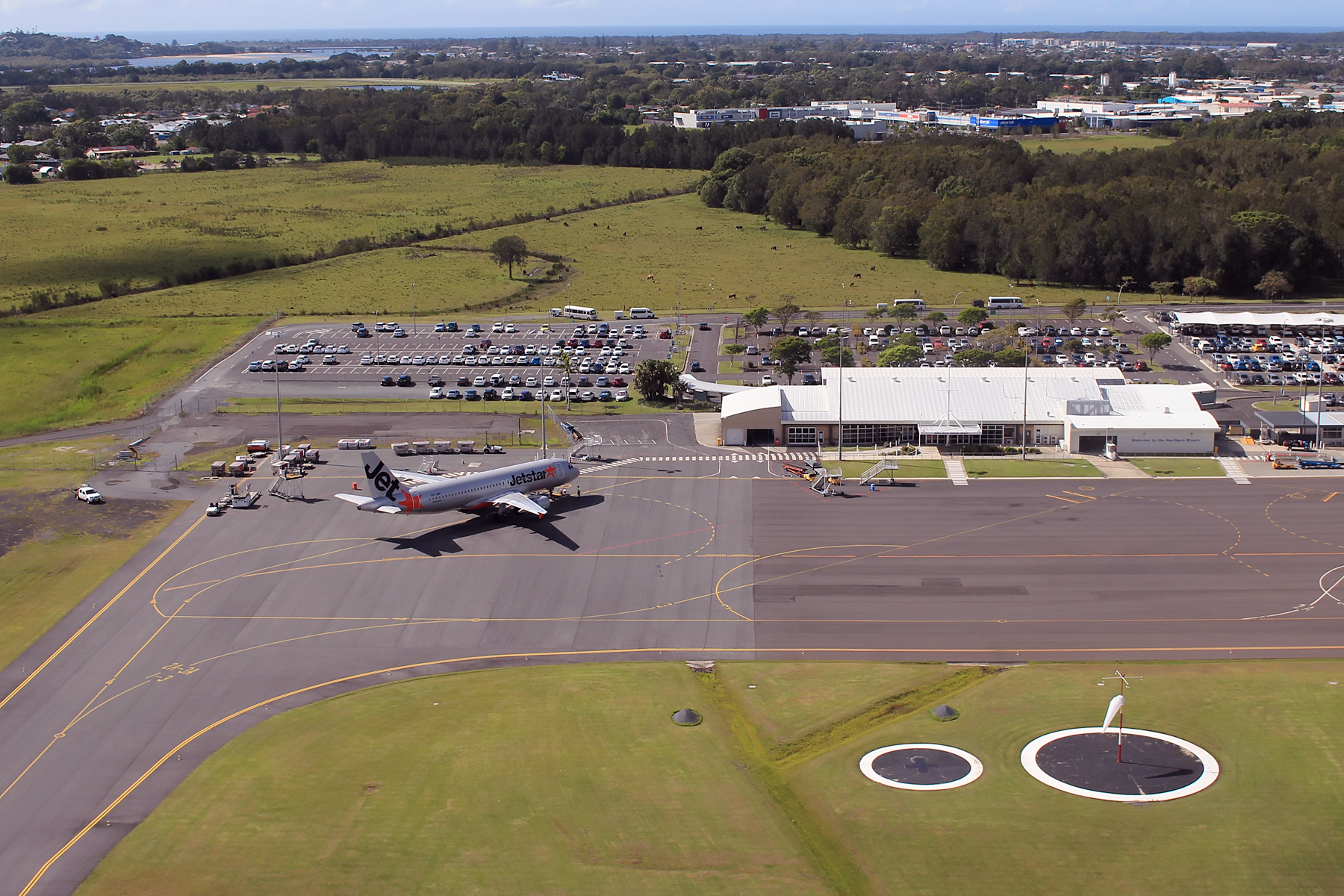
- IATA: BNK; ICAO: YBNA

Summary
- Airport type: Public
- Operator: Ballina Shire Council
- Location: Ballina, New South Wales
- Opened: October 1986
- Elevation AMSL: 7 ft / 2 m
- Coordinates: 28°50′00″S 153°33′42″E
- Website: ballinabyronairport.com.au

Map
- Location in New South Wales

Runways
Direction	Length		Surface
Direction	m	ft	Surface
06/24	1,900	6,234	Asphalt

Statistics (March 2022–23)
- Passengers: 650,323
- Aircraft movements: 6,831
- Sources: Airservices Australia, BITRE

Ballina Byron Gateway Airport (IATA: BNK, ICAO: YBNA) is a regional airport located at Ballina, New South Wales, Australia. It is owned and operated by Ballina Shire Council. It opened in October 1986.

The airport serves Ballina, Lismore, Byron Bay, and the Northern Rivers region.

Ballina Byron Airport handled 650,323 passengers between March 2022 and March 2023 making it the 16th busiest airport in Australia.

It is 5 km (3 mi) from the Ballina CBD, in Southern Cross Drive. An occasional bus service operates to and from the airport, except on Christmas Day.

In 2005, Ballina Airport was renamed Ballina Byron Gateway Airport in a bid to attract more people to the area.

In 2022, a new access road was constructed along with upgrades to the car parking and pedestrian access. Further upgrades are proposed in the short-medium term to support the increasing passenger volumes including expanding the check-in area, expanding the departure hall and providing additional retail facilities, expanding the baggage collection capacity and additional taxiways, private aircraft terminal, air control tower and additional jet parking bays.

== Airlines and destinations ==
Airlines	Destinations
Jetstar	Melbourne, Sydney
QantasLink	Sydney
Virgin Australia	Sydney

== Operations ==
Busiest domestic routes (year ending June 2019)
Rank	Airport	Passengers	% change	Carriers
1	New South Wales Sydney Airport	432,600	▲1.8	Virgin Australia, Jetstar, Rex Airlines

== Other users ==
The Ballina Aero club, which was established in 1928, has a club house located in the general aviation hangar area. Use of the club house is available to transiting pilots.

Air T&G operate a fleet of helicopters on sight seeing, fire bombing and training duties.

Black Swan Aviation is a general aviation aircraft maintenance facility carrying out all types of maintenance.

Classic Aero Adventure Flights operates a CAC Winjeel on warbird joy flights around the local district.

White Star Aviation provides flight training, Tecnam aircraft sales and FBO services. Cirrus Aircraft also operate an office inside White Star Aviation's facilities.

Australia's only Cirrus Vision SF50 (rego N755DS) is stored at Ballina Byron Gateway Airport.

== Gallery ==
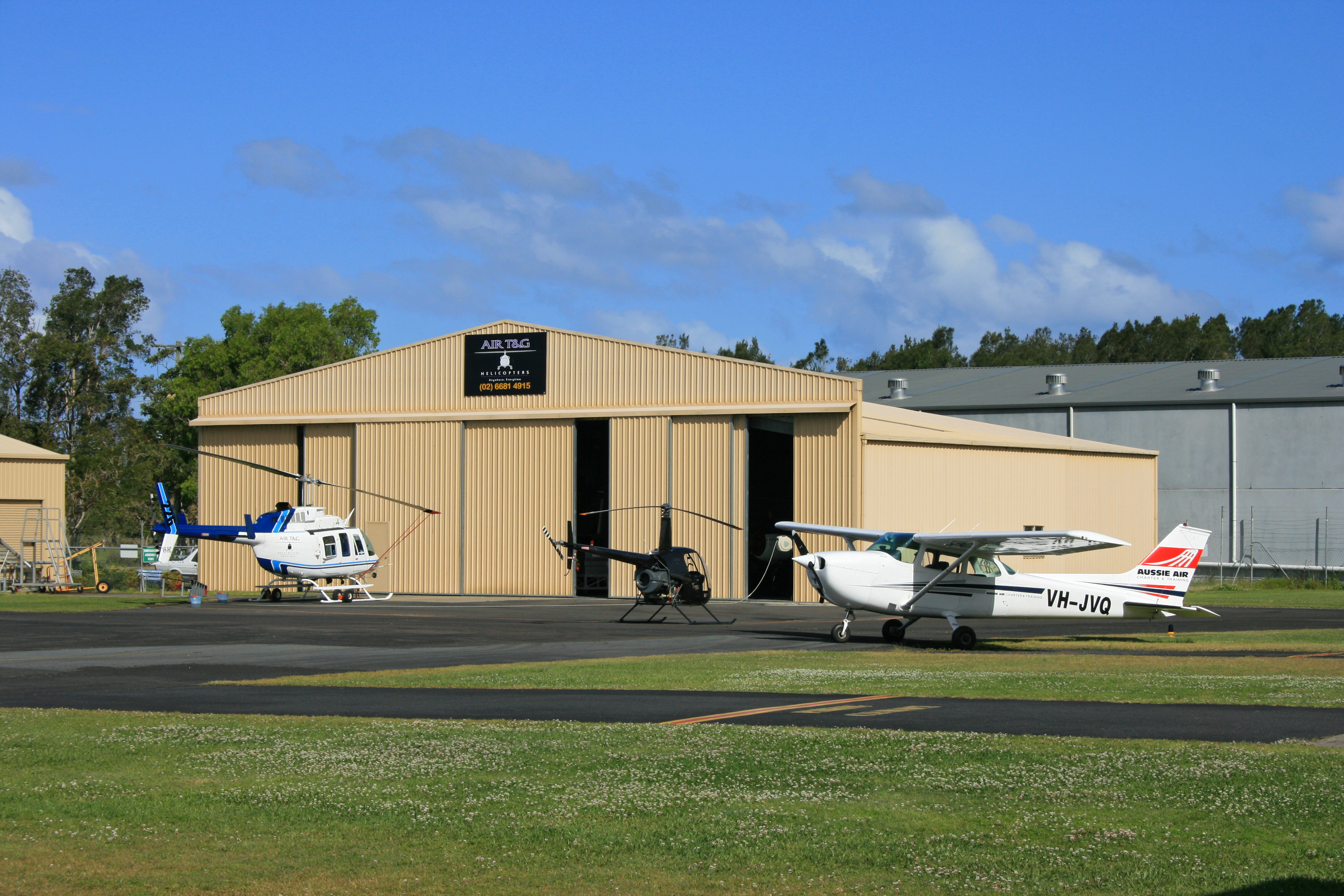
Air T&G hangar, Ballina Airport

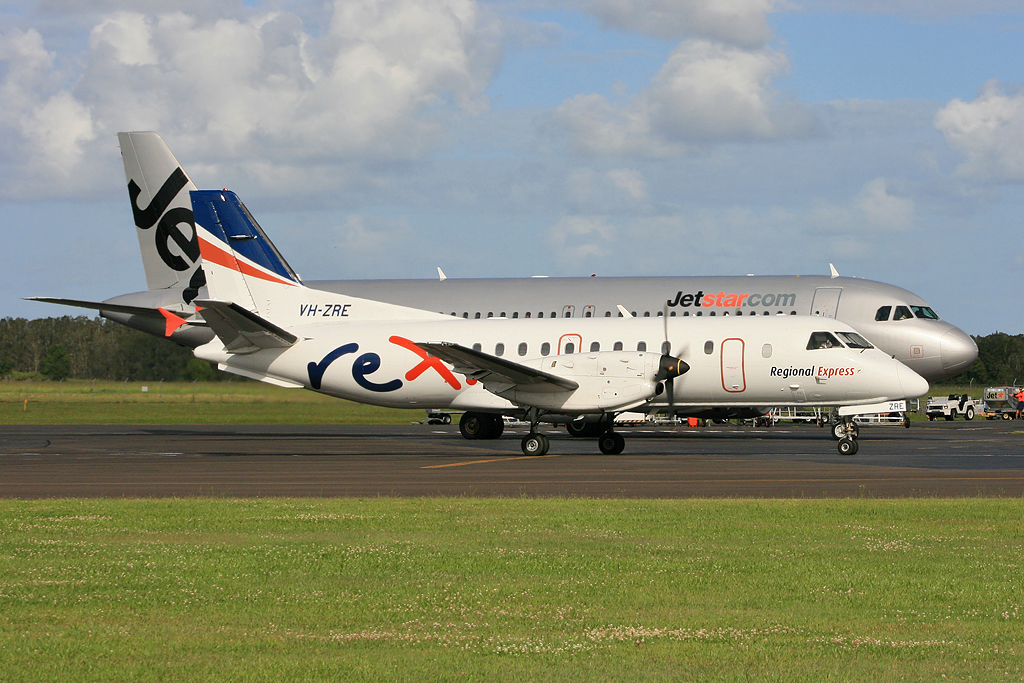
Rex Airlines SAAB 340 at Ballina Byron Gateway Airport

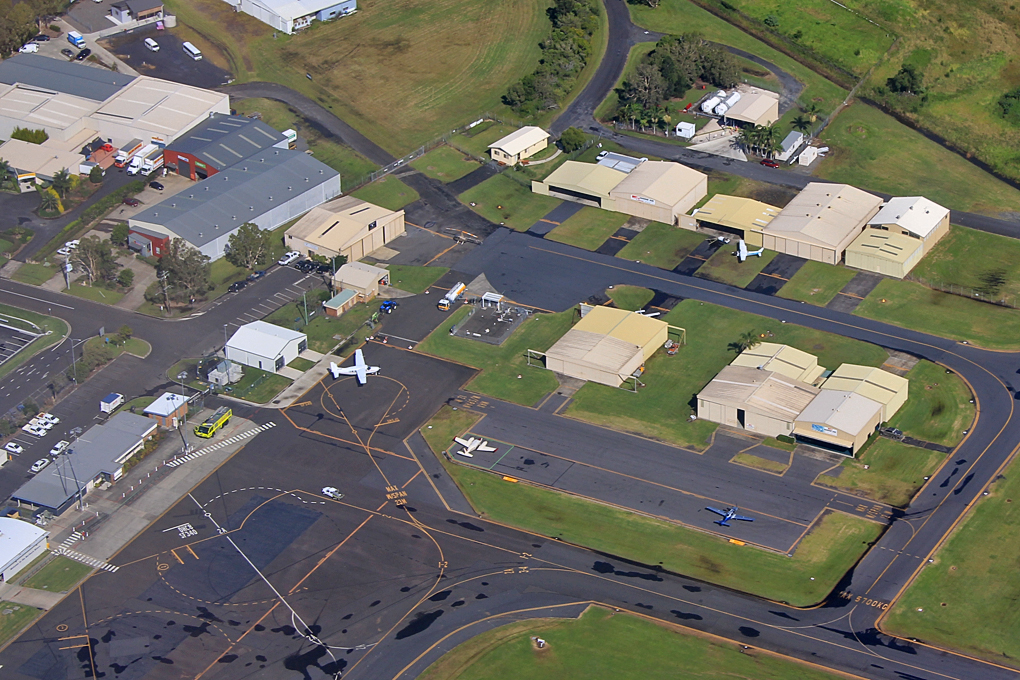
Ballina Airport general aviation hangars
