= Rous, New South Wales =

Rous New South Wales
- Coordinates: 28°52′6″S 153°24′11″E
- Population: 227 (2016 census)
- Postcode(s): 2477
- LGA(s): Ballina Shire
- State electorate(s): Ballina
- Federal division(s): Page

Rous is a small town located in the Northern Rivers Region of New South Wales.
