= Brooklet =

Brooklet may refer to the following places:

- Brooklet, New South Wales, Australia
- Brooklet, Georgia, United States
