= Alston =

Alston may refer to:

== People ==
- Alston (name)

== Places ==
=== Australia ===
- Alstonvale, New South Wales
- Alstonville, New South Wales

=== Canada ===
- Alstonvale, Quebec

=== England ===
- Alston, Cumbria
- Alston, East Devon, Devon
- Alston, South Hams, in Malborough, Devon
- Alston, Lancashire, formerly in the Amounderness registration district
- Alston, Suffolk
- Alston Moor, a civil parish in Cumbria

=== United States ===
- Alston, Georgia
- Alston, Michigan
- Alston, Oregon
- Alston, South Carolina
- Dresser, California, formerly Alston

== See also ==
- National Collegiate Athletic Association v. Alston, 2021 United States Supreme Court decision
- Alliston
- Allston
- Alstone (disambiguation)
