= Empire Vale =

- Town
- Coordinates: 28°54′54″S 153°31′4″E
- Country: Australia
- State: New South Wales
- LGA: Ballina Shire

Government
  - State electorate: Ballina
  - Federal division: Richmond Page

Population
  - Total: 185 (2021 census)
- Postcode: 2478

Empire Vale, formerly known as German Creek, is a locality in the Ballina Shire of New South Wales, Australia.

== History ==
Empire Vale was founded as German Creek. On 1 May 1915, the town was renamed Empire Vale due to racism against Germans during World War I.

== Demographics ==
As of the 2021 Australian census, 185 people resided in Empire Vale, up from 173 in the 2016 census. The median age of persons in Empire Vale was 48 years. There were more males than females, with 54.1% of the population male and 45.9% female. The average household size was 2.7 people per household.
