= Alstonvale, New South Wales =

Rural locality in New South Wales, Australia

Alstonvale
- Town
- Coordinates: 28°47′43″S 153°26′56″E
- Country: Australia
- State: New South Wales
- LGA: Ballina Shire

Government
  - State electorate: Ballina
  - Federal division: Page

Population
  - Total: 431 (2021 census)
- Postcode: 2477

Alstonvale is a rural locality in the Northern Rivers Region of New South Wales, Australia.
