= Knockrow, New South Wales =

Knockrow New South Wales
- Coordinates: 28°45′54″S 153°32′4″E
- Population: 186 (2021 census)
- Postcode(s): 2479
- LGA(s): Ballina Shire
- State electorate(s): Ballina
- Federal division(s): Richmond

Knockrow is a locality in the Ballina Shire of New South Wales, Australia and it is approximately 14 kilometres (8.7 mi) to the regional centre of Ballina.

== Demographics ==
As of the 2021 Australian census, 186 people resided in Knockrow, down from 192 in the 2016 census. The median age of persons in Knockrow was 53 years. There were fewer males than females, with 47.3% of the population male and 52.7% female. The average household size was 2.5 people per household.
