= Uralba, New South Wales =

Uralba
- Town
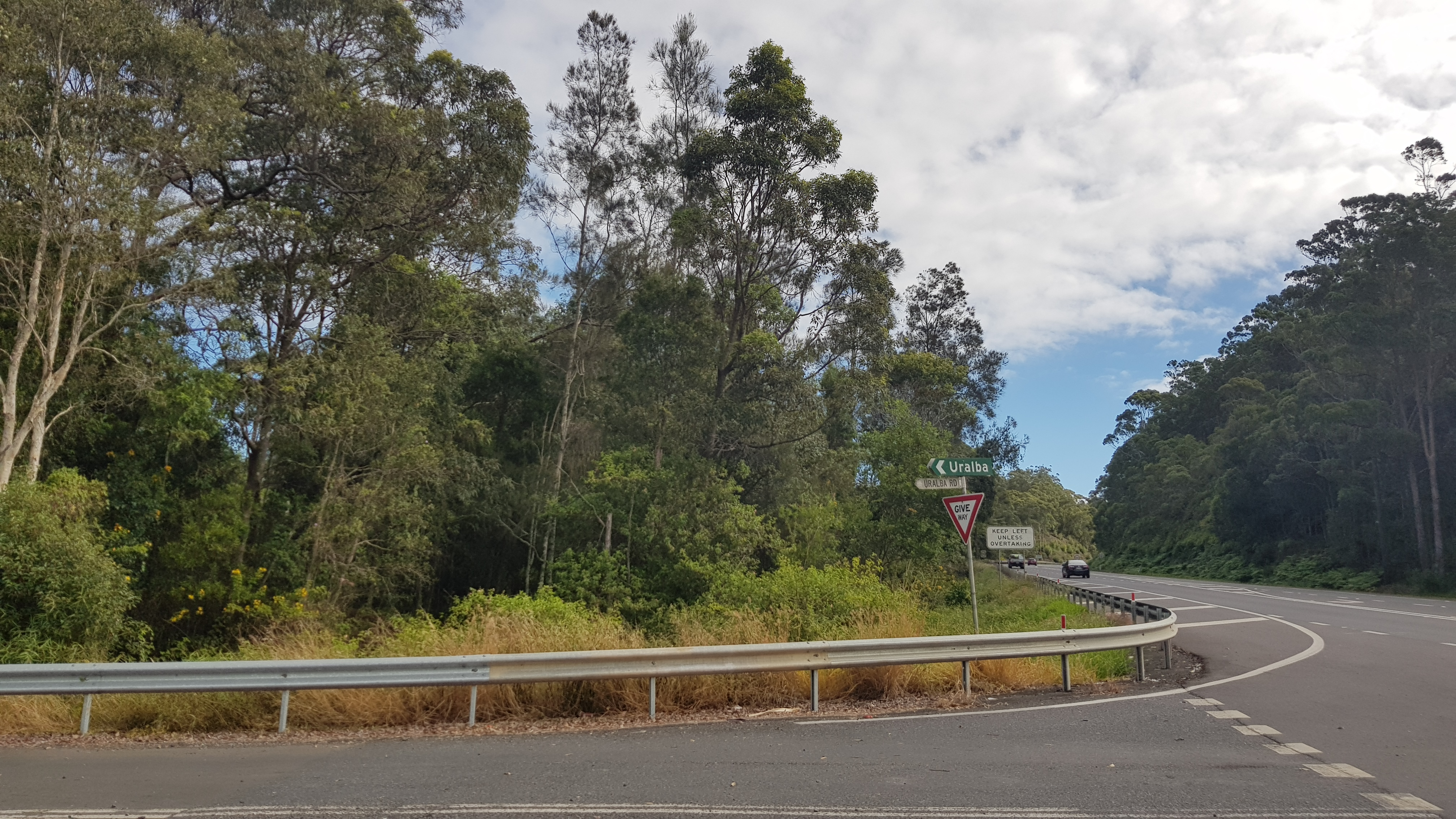
- Uralba Road, 2023

- Coordinates: 28°52′17″S 153°28′53″E
- Country: Australia
- State: New South Wales
- LGA: Ballina Shire
- Location: 14 km (8.7 mi) from Ballina; 736 km (457 mi) from Sydney

Population
  - Total: 266 (SAL 2021)
- Postcode: 2477
Localities around Uralba
Alstonville	Teven
Lynwood	Uralba	Ballina
Meershaum Vale	Coolgardie	Pimlico

Uralba is a rural locality located on the Far North Coast of New South Wales (in Australia). Its name means "place of plenteous quartz stones".

Administratively it is part of the Ballina Shire. It is located about 14 kilometres (8.7 mi) west from Ballina. Sydney, the state capital, is located approximately 736 kilometres (457 mi) or 8.5 hours car drive south.

== Demographics ==
In the 2016 census, Uralba was represented as a State suburb (SSC14050). It had a population 216 in 69 families. The median age was 54 years. Most people living in Uralba were born in Australia (84%). In the 2021 census, Uralba's population had increased to 266.

=== Economy ===
According to the 2016 census, the median household income was $1402 per week.

There were 99 people employed in 2016, and 10 people unemployed. The most common occupations were Professionals (30%); Managers (15%); Community and Personal Service Workers (11%); Sales Workers (11%) and Labourers(11%). The top 5 industries for employment were Fruit and Tree Nut Growing (9%), Local Government Administration (9%), Other Allied Health Services (7%), Road and Bridge Construction (5%) and Site Preparation Services (5%).

=== Housing ===
In the 2016 census, the median housing loan repayment was $1,967 per month. The median rent was $225 per week. This equated to just over 15% of median household income. The average household size was 2.5 persons.

== Environment ==
Uralba Nature Reserve, a 288 hectares (710 acres) nature reserve was gazetted as a State Forest in 1910 and as a nature reserve in 1975.

== See also ==
- HMAS Uralba was an auxiliary minefield tender and armament stores carrier operated by the Royal Australian Navy (RAN) during World War II.
