= Wollongbar, New South Wales =

Town in New South Wales, Australia

Wollongbar New South Wales
- Coordinates: 28°49′0″S 153°24′0″E
- Population: 2,988 (2021 census)
- Postcode(s): 2477
- Elevation: 166 m (545 ft)
- Time zone: AEST (UTC+10)
  - Summer (DST): AEDT (UTC+11)
- LGA(s): Ballina Shire
- State electorate(s): Ballina
- Federal division(s): Page
| Mean max temp | Mean min temp | Annual rainfall |
| 23.4 °C; 74 °F | 15.0 °C; 59 °F | 1,784.9 mm 70.3 in |

Wollongbar is a town (2021 population: 2,988) in the Northern Rivers region of New South Wales, Australia. The town is located on the Bruxner Highway between the towns of Lismore and Alstonville.

== Schools ==
Wollongbar Public School is at the centre of the Wollongbar community. It has a school motto of "Learning for Life". It is a member of The Plateau to the Sea Learning Community. School achievements include representation at regional and state levels of sporting competition and performing arts opportunities.

== Sport ==
Historical population
| Year | Pop. | ±% |
|---|---|---|
| 1981 | 477 | — |
| 1986 | 707 | +48.2% |
| 1991 | 1,266 | +79.1% |
| 1996 | 1,858 | +46.8% |
| 2001 | 1,953 | +5.1% |
| 2006 | 1,846 | −5.5% |
| 2011 | 2,116 | +14.6% |
| 2016 | 2,117 | +0.0% |
| 2021 | 2,998 | +41.6% |
Source: Australian Bureau of Statistics data.

Wollongbar's main sporting club is the Wollongbar Alstonville Rugby (W.A.R) which was founded in 1992. The club has teams from under 8s right through to under 19s and has 3 grade sides. The club has won numerous junior premierships and 5 straight first grade titles. WAR plays at Lyle Park, Wollongbar.
