= Nashua, New South Wales =

Town in New South Wales, Australia

Nashua
- Town
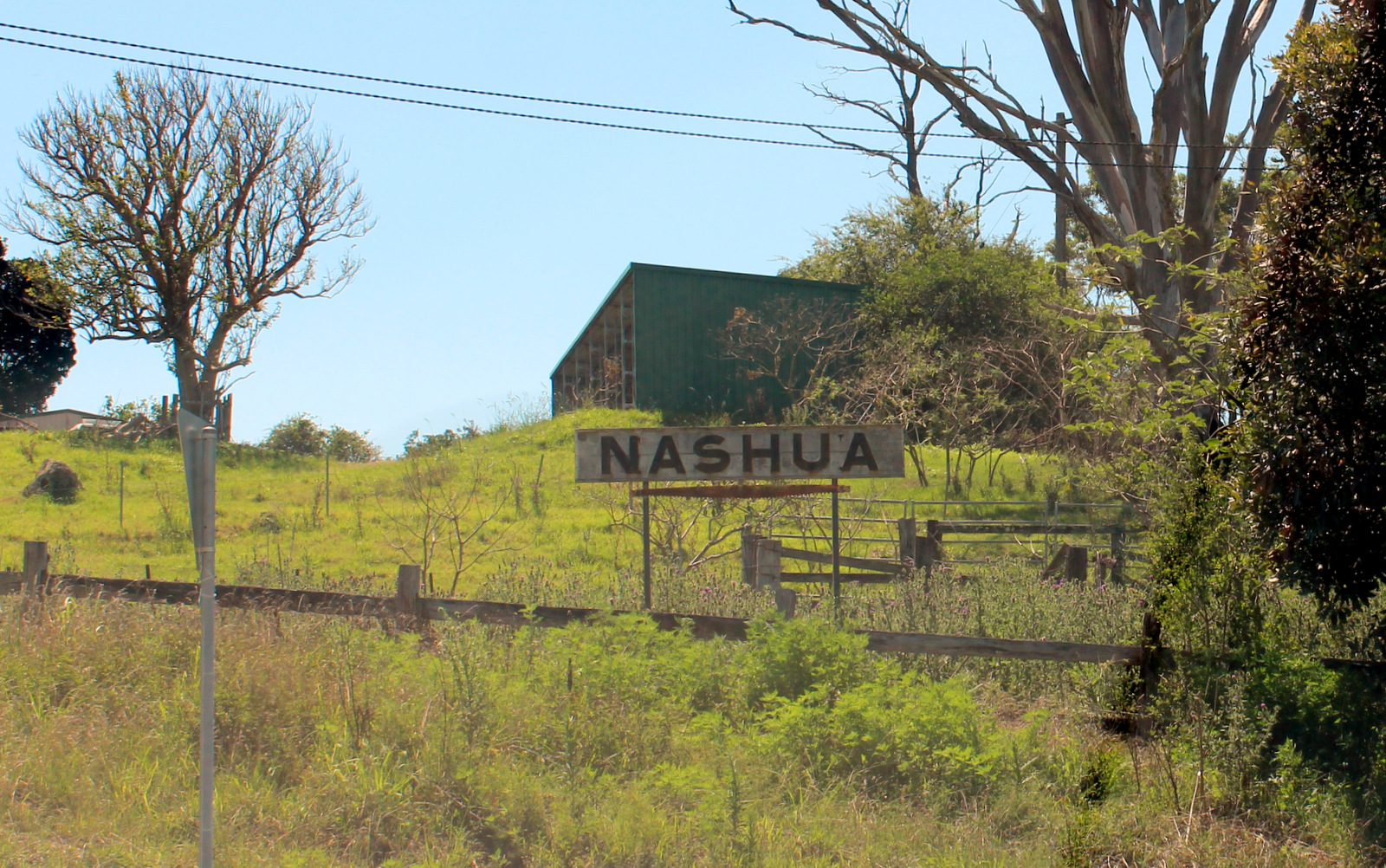
- old railway sign

- Coordinates: 28°43.629′S 153°28.017′E
- Country: Australia
- State: New South Wales

Government
  - State electorate: Ballina
  - Federal division: Richmond

Population
  - Total: 238 (2016 census)
- Postcode: 2479
- Mean max temp: 25.5 °C (77.9 °F)
- Mean min temp: 13.2 °C (55.8 °F)
- Annual rainfall: 1,400 mm (55 in)

Nashua is a former railway station and locality in the north-east of New South Wales, between Lismore and Byron Bay.

== Naming & Agriculture ==
Originally called Springvale. However, James and John Toohey named their property Nashua, a word borrowed from a tribe of New England American Indians, meaning "land between two rivers" or "river with the pebbled bottom". It is not well understood why the Irish brothers so named their property. The Tooheys planned to grow sugar cane at Nashua, however frost destroyed their crops. Today, the undulating countryside sustains dairy cattle, pecan nuts and other agriculture. The New South Wales government used the property name for the railway station, and the name has persisted to this day.

== Construction ==
Nashua Hall was built in 1909 for £149 10/-, but blown down by a storm in 1942 and not rebuilt. "Flower of the Forest", the 19th century hotel, the school and the General Store are also gone. The pub was popular during the days of the railway line construction. The Ballina-Booyong railway line was opened in 1930, but damaged by floods in 1948 and officially closed in 1953.

== Orientation ==
The area was subtropical rainforest, part of the Bundjalung nation, before the Big Scrub was cleared in the late 19th century. A remnant of the forest is at nearby Booyong Flora Reserve. The red-brown soil is derived from a basaltic flow from the nearby Mount Warning and later volcanic flows from the Nightcap Range. Average annual rainfall at Lismore is 1340 mm and 1733 mm at Byron Bay.
