= Pimlico, New South Wales =

Pimlico New South Wales
- Coordinates: 28°53′47″S 153°29′21″E
- Population: 297 (2016 census)
- Postcode(s): 2478
- LGA(s): Ballina Shire
- State electorate(s): Ballina
- Federal division(s): Page; Richmond

Pimlico is a small town located in the Northern Rivers Region of New South Wales.
