= Alstone =

Alstone may refer to:

- Alstone, Cheltenham, Gloucestershire, England
- Alstone, Somerset, England
- Alstone, Tewkesbury, Gloucestershire, England

== See also ==
- Alston (disambiguation)
