= Brooklet, New South Wales =

Brooklet New South Wales
- Coordinates: 28°44′21″S 153°30′10″E
- Population: 257 (2016 census)
- Postcode(s): 2479
- LGA(s): Ballina Shire
- State electorate(s): Ballina

Brooklet is a small town located in the Northern Rivers Region of New South Wales.
