= Dalwood, New South Wales (Ballina Shire) =

Dalwood New South Wales
- Coordinates: 28°53′39″S 153°24′39″E
- Population: 234 (2016 census)
- Postcode(s): 2477
- LGA(s): Ballina Shire
- State electorate(s): Ballina
- Federal division(s): Page

Dalwood is a locality in the Ballina Shire of New South Wales, Australia. It had a population of 234 as of the 2016 census.
