= West Ballina, New South Wales =

West Ballina New South Wales
- Coordinates: 28°51′51″S 153°32′6″E
- Population: 3,230 (2021 census)
- Postcode(s): 2478
- LGA(s): Ballina Shire
- State electorate(s): Ballina
- Federal division(s): Richmond

West Ballina is a suburb of Ballina located in the Northern Rivers Region of New South Wales.

== Demographics ==
As of the 2021 Australian census, 3,230 people resided in West Ballina, up from 3,023 in the 2016 census. The median age of persons in West Ballina was 54 years. There were fewer males than females, with 48.3% of the population male and 51.7% female. The average household size was 2.1 people per household.
