= South Lismore, New South Wales =

South Lismore is a locality in New South Wales and it is a suburb of the larger city of Lismore.

It is on the traditional lands of the Widjabul/Wia-bal people of the Bundjalung nation who are the traditional owners of the land.
