= Lennox Head, New South Wales =

Town in New South Wales, Australia

Lennox Head
- Town
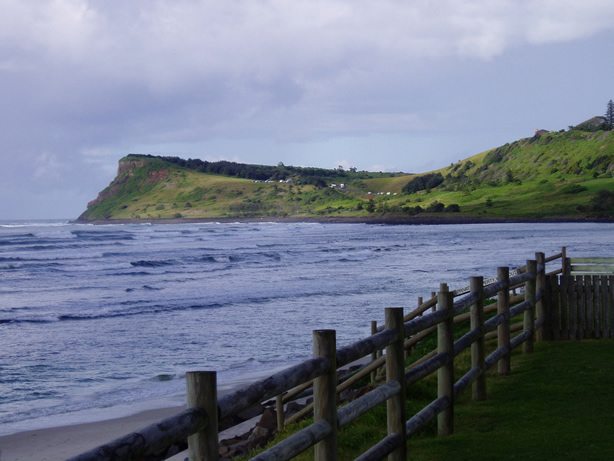
- Lennox Point

- Coordinates: 28°48′S 153°35′E
- Country: Australia
- State: New South Wales
- LGA: Ballina Shire
- Location: 11 km (6.8 mi) from Ballina; 186 km (116 mi) from Brisbane; 20 km (12 mi) from Byron Bay

Government
  - State electorate: Ballina
  - Federal division: Richmond

Population
  - Total: 7,741 (2016 census)
- Postcode: 2478

Lennox Head is a seaside village in the Northern Rivers region of New South Wales, Australia, situated on the stretch of coast between Byron Bay and Ballina in Ballina Shire local government area. It had a population of 7,741 in the 2016 Australian census.

It is on the lands of the Bundjalung people, who are the traditional owners of this region.

Captain Henry John Rous, on the survey ship Rainbow, named Lennox Head after his friend, Charles Gordon-Lennox, 5th Duke of Richmond in 1828. From 1842, freed convicts who now worked as loggers, formed small colonies in the area which would eventually become the town.

== Geology ==
The headland was created in the Cenozoic era as part of one of the lava flows from the Tweed Volcano, a shield volcano, centred on what is now Mount Warning. The basaltic lava spread south and east from the volcano in a succession of flows which covered to varying depths an older landform uplifted from the ocean bed in the Mesozoic era.

== Significant events ==
In 1957, a major bushfire which had burned for several days in swamp behind Lennox Head changed direction and swept through the town. Local residents had some warning and sheltered in the space between the lake and the ocean. No houses were lost.

On 3 June 2010, the village was hit by a small Tornado, which severely damaged thirty homes, a number of people were injured and seven vans overturned at the Lake Ainsworth Caravan Park.

In January 2014, a major bushfire broke out just north of the town, igniting heathland all the way north to Suffolk Park. The blaze was started by a lightning strike and continued for another month due to underground peat fires.

== Population ==
Historical population
| Year | Pop. | ±% |
|---|---|---|
| 1971 | 437 | — |
| 1976 | 843 | +92.9% |
| 1981 | 1,199 | +42.2% |
| 1986 | 1,854 | +54.6% |
| 1991 | 3,036 | +63.8% |
| 1996 | 4,511 | +48.6% |
| 2001 | 5,809 | +28.8% |
| 2006 | 6,618 | +13.9% |
| 2011 | 5,764 | −12.9% |
| 2016 | 6,096 | +5.8% |
| 2021 | 7,483 | +22.8% |
Source: Australian Bureau of Statistics data.

According to the 2016 census of Population, there were 7,741 people in the Lennox Head - Skennars Head area.

- Aboriginal and Torres Strait Islander people made up 1.9% of the population.
- 82.0% of people were born in Australia. The most next common countries of birth were England 4.1% and New Zealand 1.8%.
- 91.0% of people only spoke English at home.
- The most common responses for religion were No Religion 35.8%, Catholic 25.1% and Anglican 16.0%.

== Tourism ==
The headland, also known as Lennox Point, is used by surfers, who come for the noted righthand break. Hang-gliders too visit the headland to launch off its 65m cliff. The point is also used for watching dolphins surfing and the annual whale migration.

The Pat Morton lookout on the headland, which named for Pat Morton, has views of the village and of Seven Mile Beach extending north towards Broken Head.

The town is known for its pub, caravan park, as well as Lake Ainsworth, a freshwater lake that has distinctive tannin-stained waters from the surrounding tea trees and is in contrasts with the white sands of Seven Mile Beach. Over the warmer summer months the lake is subject to blue green algal bloom.

Lennox Head markets are held on the second and fifth Sunday of the month, at the community centre.

There is one primary school, Lennox Head Public School.

== Lennox Head Aboriginal Area ==
Lennox Head is home to the Lennox Head Aboriginal Area which is a small reserve, approximately 0.3 hectares in size, which was gazetted in 1972. It was created to protect The Ceremonial Ring which is of great significance to the local Bundjalung Tribe and it is also listed on the (now closed) Register of the National Estate.

The Ceremonial Ring is a Bora ring which was used by the Bundjalung people to initiate boys of the tribe an it consists of a raised ring on sandy ground, around 32 metres in diameter, and it is one of the best preserved coastal ceremonial grounds in New South Wales

== Sport and recreation ==
Lennox Head Dolphins is a rugby league club that competes in the Northern Rivers Regional Rugby League competition.

Lennox Head Rugby Union Club is a rugby union club that competes in the Far North Coast Rugby zone. Known as The Trojans, it was established in 1999. The club’s home ground is Williams Reserve, Lennox Head.

== Notable residents ==
- Pat Rafter – professional tennis player
- Sam Cromack – lead vocalist of Australian indie rock band Ball Park Music, record producer
- Simon Baker – actor

== Gallery ==
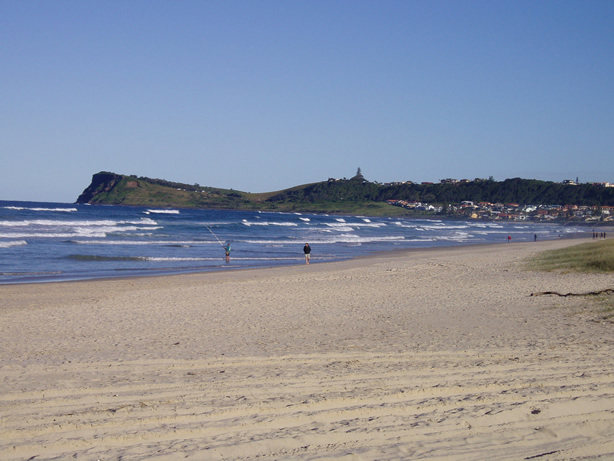
Lennox Point

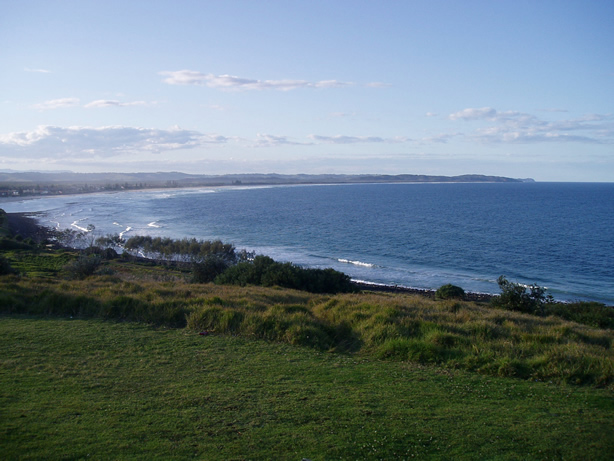
Looking towards Byron Bay from Lennox Point

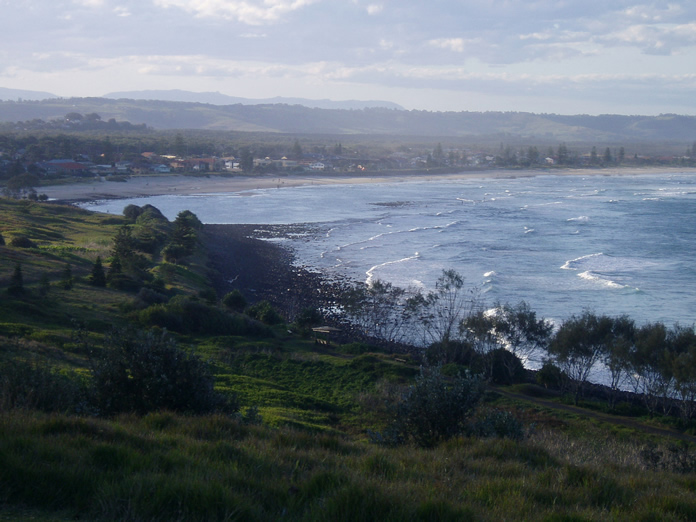
Looking at Seven Mile Beach from Lennox Point

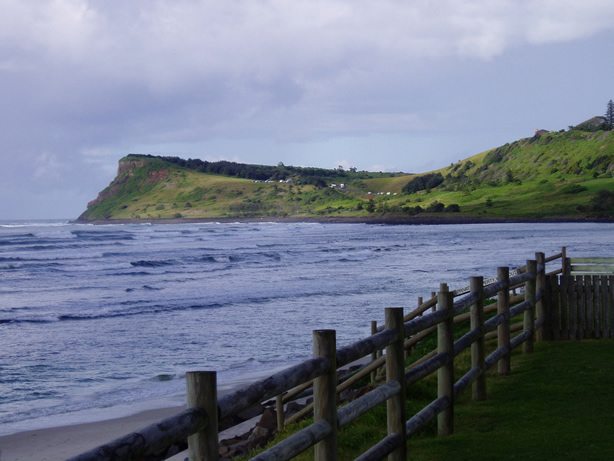
Lennox Point

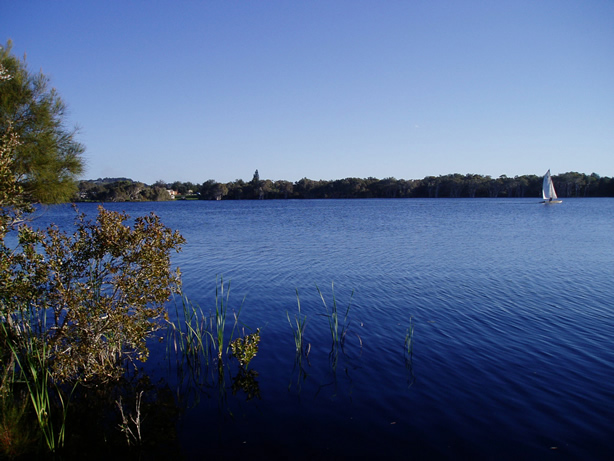
Fresh Water Lake - Lake Ainsworth

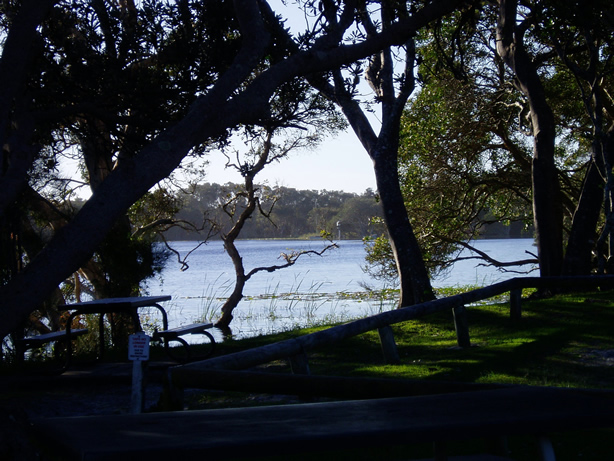
Lake Ainsworth

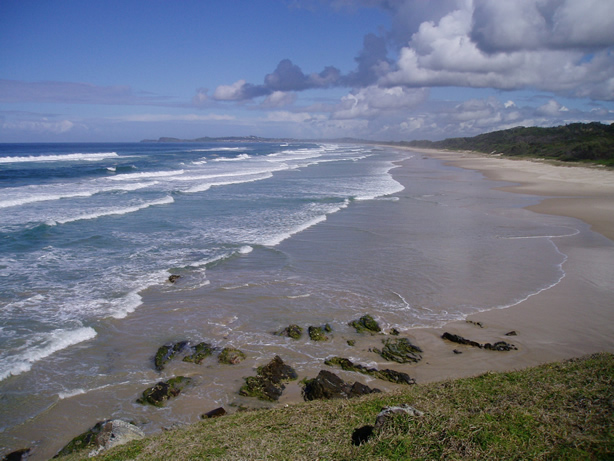
Looking toward Lennox Head from the northern end of Seven Mile Beach

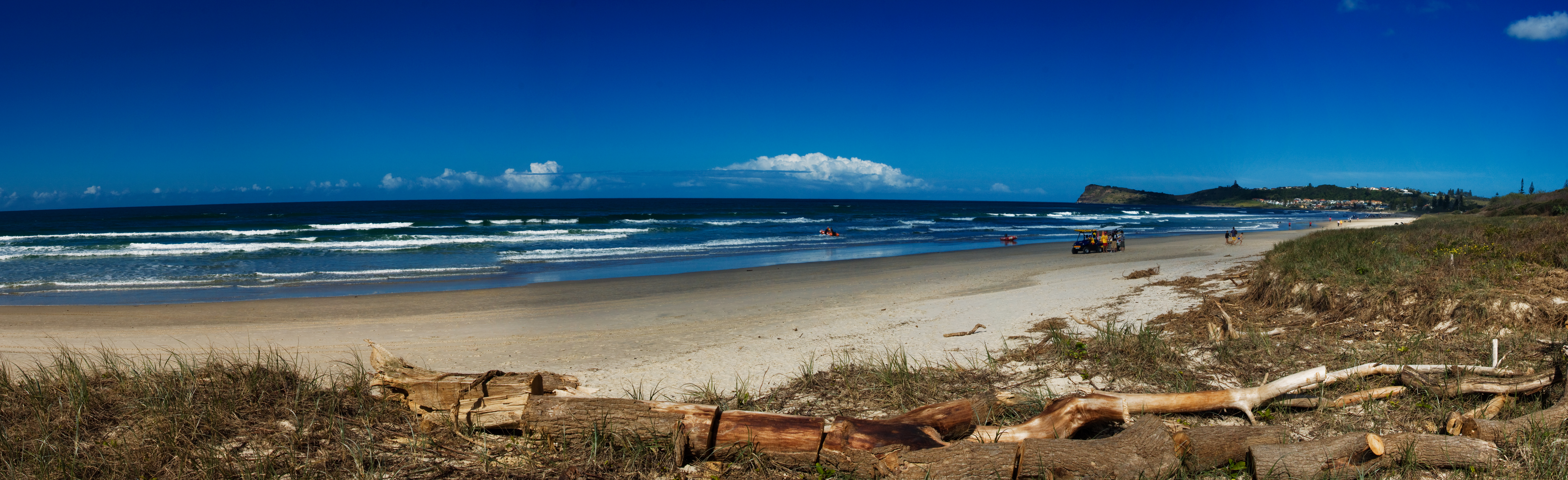
Panorama Showing Lennox Point and Training Surf Lifesavers

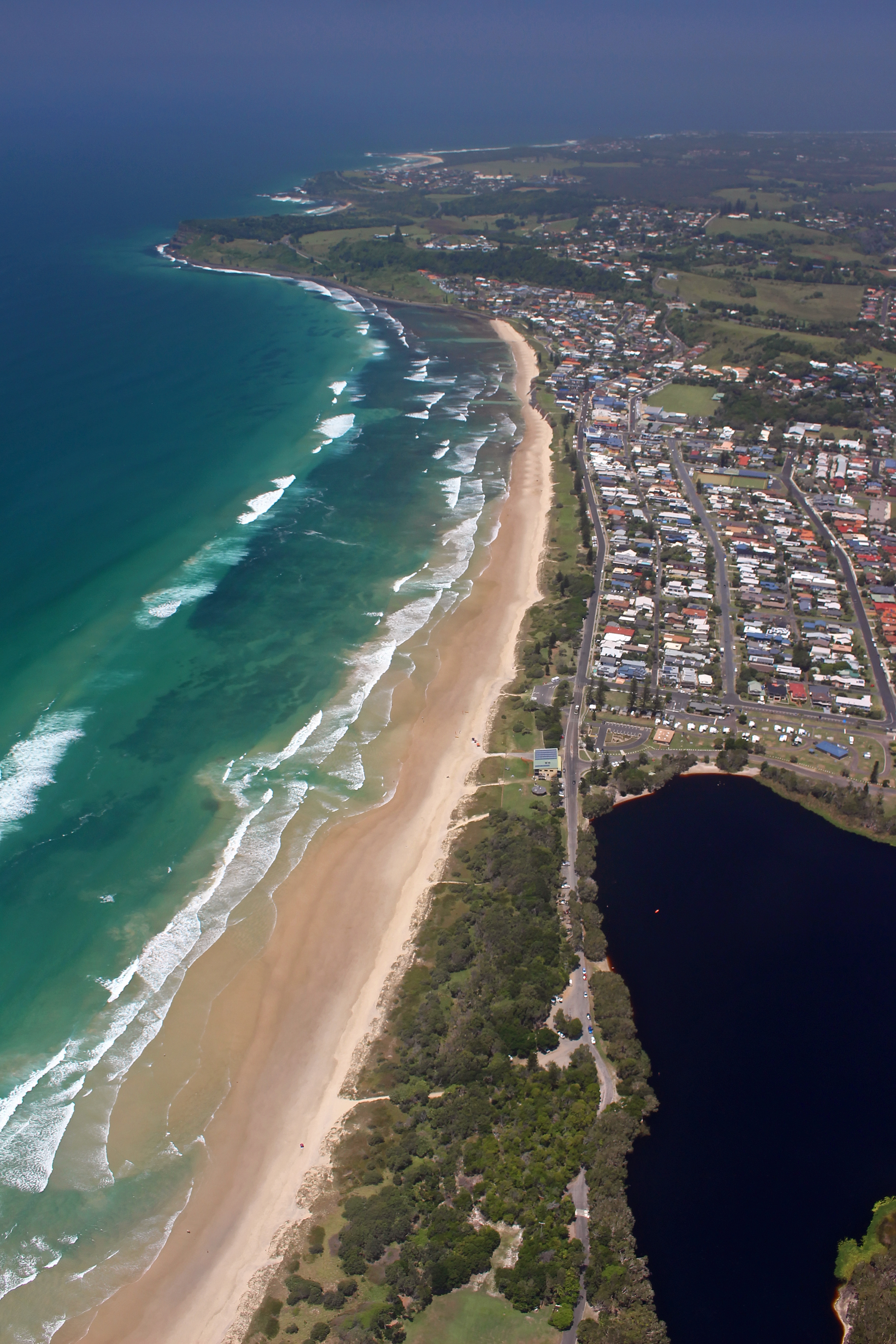
Seven Mile Beach and Lennox Head

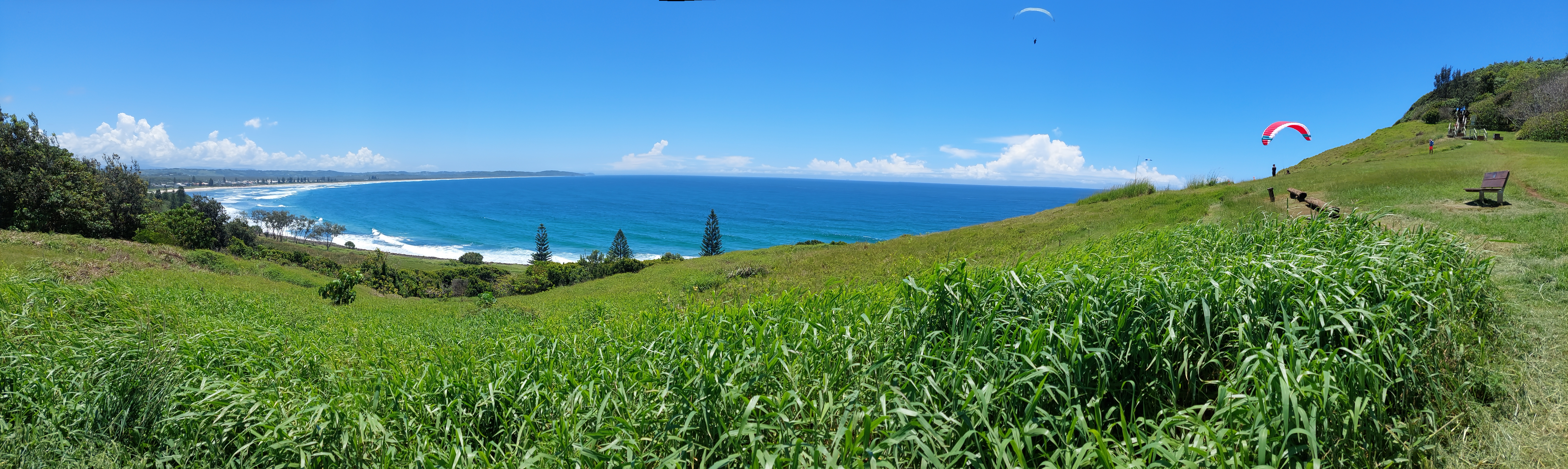
Lennox Head from Pat Morton Lookout (panorama)

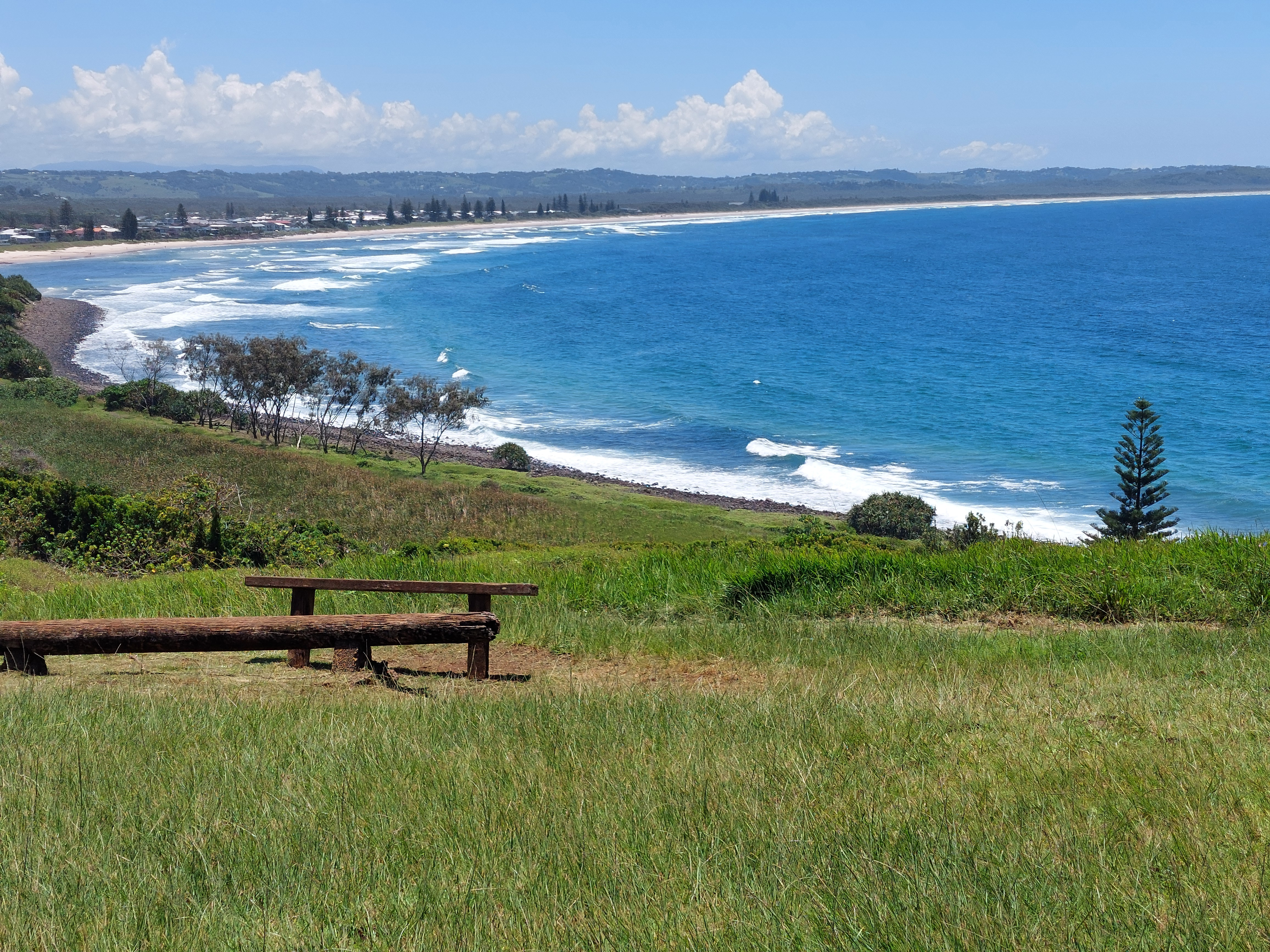
Lennox Head from Pat Morton Lookout

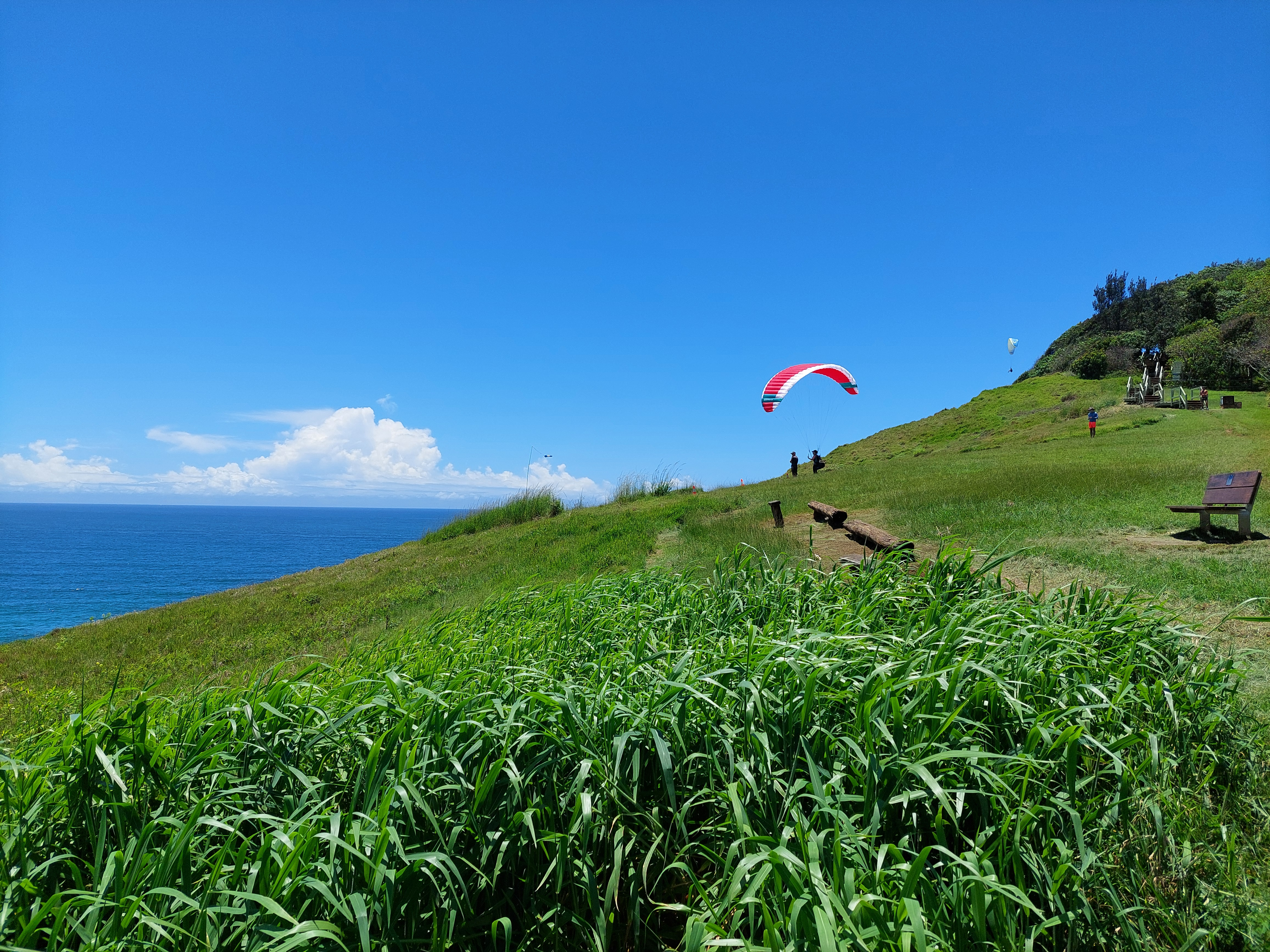
Paragliders at Pat Morton Lookout
