= Ballina Shire =

Local government area in New South Wales, Australia

- Local government area
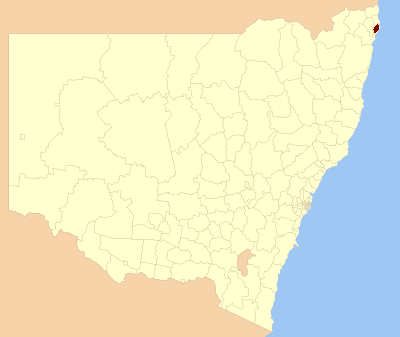
- Location in New South Wales

- Interactive map of Ballina Shire
- Coordinates: 28°50′S 153°32′E
- Country: Australia
- State: New South Wales
- Region: Northern Rivers
- Established: 1 January 1977
- Council seat: Ballina

Government
  - Mayor: Sharon Cadwallader
  - State electorate: Ballina
  - Federal divisions: Richmond; Page

Area
  - Total: 485 km^{2} (187 sq mi)

Population
  - Total: 46,850 (2022)
  - Density: 96.60/km^{2} (250.19/sq mi)
- Website: Ballina Shire
LGAs around Ballina Shire
Lismore	Byron	Tasman Sea
Lismore	Ballina Shire	Tasman Sea
Richmond Valley	Richmond Valley	Tasman Sea

Ballina Shire is a local government area in the Northern Rivers region of New South Wales, Australia. The Shire was formed on 1 January 1977 by the amalgamation of the Municipality of Ballina and Tintenbar Shire. The Shire is located adjacent to the Tasman Sea and the Pacific Highway. The council seat is located in the town of Ballina. The population of the Ballina Shire area was 46,850 in 2022.

The mayor of Ballina Shire Council is Sharon Cadwallader.

== Towns and localities ==
=== Other localities ===
- Alstonvale
- Alstonville
- Bagotville (shared with Lismore)
- Brooklet
- Cabbage Tree Island
- Dalwood
- Empire Vale
- Fernleigh
- Knockrow
- Lennox Head
- Lynwood
- Marom Creek (shared with Lismore)
- McLeans Ridges
- Meerschaum Vale
- Newrybar (shared with Byron)
- Pimlico
- Rous
- South Ballina
- Teven
- Tintenbar
- Tuckombil
- Uralba
- Wardell
- Wollongbar

== Heritage listings ==
The Ballina Shire has a number of heritage-listed sites, including:

- High Conservation Value Old Growth forest

== Demographics ==
At the 2016 census, there were 41,790 people in the Ballina local government area; of these 48.2 per cent were male and 51.8 per cent were female. Aboriginal and Torres Strait Islander people made up 3.3 per cent of the population, which was higher than the national (2.9%) and state averages (2.8%). The median age of people in the Ballina Shire area was 48 years, which was significantly higher than the national median of 38 years. Children aged 0–14 years made up 16.7 per cent of the population and people aged 65 years and over made up 25.0 per cent of the population. Of people in the area aged 15 years and over, 48.9 per cent were married and 14.4 per cent were either divorced or separated.

Population growth in the Ballina Shire area between the 2001 census and the 2006 census was 3.89 per cent; and in the subsequent five years to the 2011 census, population growth was 2.11 per cent. When compared with total population growth of Australia for the same periods, being 5.78 per cent and 8.32 per cent respectively, population growth in the Ballina local government area was significantly lower than the national average. Growth increased to a 9.2% increase between 2011 and 2016, compared to a national average of 8.8%. The median weekly income for residents within the Ballina Shire area was significantly lower than the national average.

At the 2016 census, the proportion of residents in the Ballina local government area who stated their ancestry as Australian or English exceeded 60 per cent of all residents (national average was 48.3 per cent). Nearly 60% of all residents in the Ballina nominated a religious affiliation with Christianity at the 2011 census. Ballina Shire had a significantly higher proportion of households (89.1 per cent) where English only was spoken at home (national average was 72.7 per cent).

Selected historical census data for the Ballina Shire local government area
Census year		2001	2006	2011	2016
Population	Estimated residents on census night	37,017	▲38,461	▲39,274	▲41,790
Population	LGA rank in terms of size within New South Wales			50th	50th
Population	% of New South Wales population			0.56%	
Population	% of Australian population	0.20%	0.19%	0.18%	
Cultural and language diversity					
Ancestry, top responses	English			32.0%	31.5%
Ancestry, top responses	Australian			31.2%	28.8%
Ancestry, top responses	Irish			10.5%	10.5%
Ancestry, top responses	Scottish			8.1%	8.7%
Ancestry, top responses	German			3.1%	3.2%
Language, top responses (other than English)	Italian	0.3%	▲0.4%	0.4%	▼0.3%
Language, top responses (other than English)	German	0.3%	0.3%	0.3%	0.3%
Language, top responses (other than English)	Dutch	0.2%	0.2%	0.2%	0.2%
Language, top responses (other than English)	Spanish	n/c	n/c	▲0.2%	0.2%
Language, top responses (other than English)	Japanese	n/c	n/c	▲0.2%	n/c
	French				0.2%
Religious affiliation					
Religious affiliation, top responses	Catholic	25.1%	▲25.5%	▼25.1%	▼21.9%
Religious affiliation, top responses	Anglican	28.4%	▼26.1%	▼24.2%	▼19.1%
Religious affiliation, top responses	No Religion	13.4%	▲17.4%	▲21.4%	▲30.2%
Religious affiliation, top responses	Uniting Church	7.4%	▼6.3%	▼5.6%	▼4.3%
Religious affiliation, top responses	Presbyterian and Reformed	6.4%	▼5.6%	▼5.2%	
Median weekly incomes					
Personal income	Median weekly personal income		A$397	A$496	A$601
Personal income	% of Australian median income		85.2%	▲86.0%	▲90.8%
Family income	Median weekly family income		A$1,017	A$1,153	A$1426
Family income	% of Australian median income		86.8%	▼77.9%	▲82.2%
Household income	Median weekly household income		A$779	A$930	A$1156
Household income	% of Australian median income		75.9%	▼75.4%	▲80.4%

== Council ==
=== Current composition and election method ===
Ballina Shire Council is composed of ten councillors, including the mayor, for a fixed four-year term of office. The mayor is directly elected while the nine other councillors are elected proportionally as three separate wards, each electing three councillors. The most recent election was held on 5 August 2024, and the makeup of the council, including the mayor, is as follows:

Party	Councillors
Sharon Cadwallader Team	4
Independents	3
Greens	2
Nationals	1
Total	9
Party	Mayor
Sharon Cadwallader Team	Sharon Cadwallader

The current Council, elected in 2021, in order of election by ward, is:

Ward	Councillor	Party
Mayor	Sharon Cadwallader	Sharon Cadwallader Team
Ward A	Damian Loone	Sharon Cadwallader Team
Ward A	Erin Karsten	Greens
Ward A	Phil Meehan	Independent
Ward B	Kiri Dicker	Greens
Ward B	Michelle Bailey	Sharon Cadwallader Team
Ward B	Eva Ramsey	Independent
Ward C	Simon Chate	Greens
Ward C	Simon Kinny	Sharon Cadwallader Team
Ward C	Therese Crollick	Independent Labor

== Election results ==
=== 2024 ===
2024 New South Wales local elections: Ballina
Party	Votes	%	Swing	Seats	Change
Sharon Cadwallader Team	10,369	40.28	+11.68	3	▲1
Greens	6,706	26.05	+9.55	3	▲2
Independents	5,307	20.61	−19.79	2	▼3
Labor	1,950	7.57	−6.93	0	Steady
Independent Labor	1,410	5.47	+5.47	1	Steady
Formal votes	25,742	88.49			
Informal votes	3,349	11.51			
Total	29,091			9	
Registered voters / turnout					

=== 2021 ===
2021 New South Wales local elections: Ballina
Party	Votes	%	Swing	Seats	Change
Independent	1,0195	40.4		4	▲1
Sharon Cadwallader Team	7,227	28.6		3	
Greens	4,173	16.5	+16.5	2	▲2
Labor	3,676	14.5	+14.5	0	Steady
Formal votes	25,271	90.94			
Informal votes	2,517	9.06			
Total	27,788	100.00		9	
Registered voters / turnout	32,830	84.64			
