= Northern Rivers =

Region in New South Wales, Australia

- Region
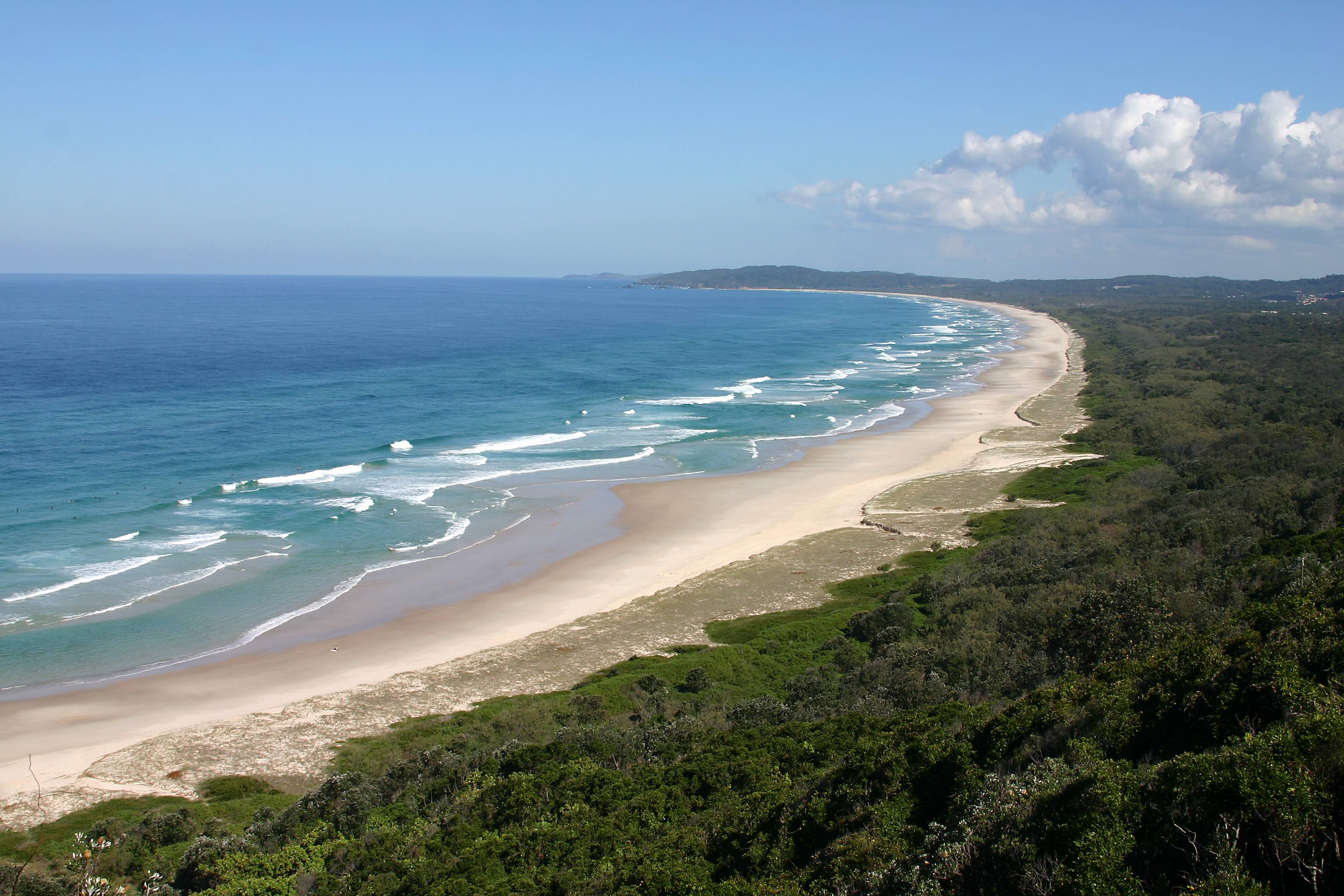
- View south from Byron Bay, the most easterly point on mainland Australia

- Coordinates: 29°09′S 153°07′E
- Country: Australia
- State: New South Wales
- LGA: Ballina Shire; Byron Shire; Clarence Valley Council; Kyogle Council; City of Lismore; Richmond Valley Council; Tweed Shire

Government
  - State electorates: Tweed; Ballina; Lismore; Clarence
  - Federal divisions: Richmond; Page; Cowper

Area
  - Total: 20,732.6 km^{2} (8,004.9 sq mi)

Population
  - Total: 313,422 (2022)
  - Density: 15.11735/km^{2} (39.15376/sq mi)
- Time zone: UTC+10 (AEST)
  - Summer (DST): UTC+11 (AEDT)
Regions around Northern Rivers
Darling Downs (QLD)	South East Queensland	Coral Sea
New England	Northern Rivers	Coral Sea
New England	Mid North Coast	Tasman Sea

The Northern Rivers is the most northeasterly region of the Australian state of New South Wales, located between 590 and 820 kilometres (370 and 510 mi) north of the state capital, Sydney, and encompasses the catchments and fertile valleys of the Clarence, Richmond, and Tweed rivers. It extends from Tweed Heads in the north (adjacent to the Queensland border) to the southern extent of the Clarence river catchment which lies between Grafton and Coffs Harbour, and includes the main towns of Tweed Heads, Byron Bay, Ballina, Kyogle, Lismore, Casino and Grafton. At its most northern point, the region is 102 kilometres (63 mi) south-southeast of the Queensland capital, Brisbane.

As with all regions of New South Wales, it has no official status, although state government department offices and local governments in the area work together for purposes such as tourism, education, water catchment management and waste management. This area has a mild, sub-tropical climate. Major industries are agriculture, fisheries, public services (particularly health) and tourism; the region is also popular for niche crops, hobby farmers, and retirees from life in the larger cities.

== Geography ==
The Northern Rivers region is bounded by the Coral Sea and the Tasman Sea to the east and the New England region to the west, where the Great Dividing Range forms a mountainous boundary. To the north is the border between New South Wales and Queensland, where the Darling Downs are located to the north-west and South East Queensland directly to the north. The southern boundary is the Dorrigo ranges, which also mark the southern boundary for the Clarence River Basin.

The defining characteristic of the region are the fertile valleys of the Clarence, Richmond and Tweed rivers and their sources, hence the region's name; and the region's white sandy beaches.

=== Demography and area ===
The following local government areas are contained within the region:

Population by Local Government Area
Richmond Tweed rank	Local government area	Population 2022	10 year growth rate	Population density (people/km^{2})
1	Tweed Shire	97,969	9.7	74.2
3	Ballina Shire	46,850	13.9	96.6
4	City of Lismore	44,276	-0.3	34.3
5	Byron Shire	36,510	17.0	65.6
6	Richmond Valley Council	23,702	3.7	7.8
7	Kyogle Council	9,453	0.4	2.6
Richmond Tweed		258,760	8.6	25.1
2	Clarence Valley Council	54,662	6.4	5.2
Northern Rivers		313,422	8.2	10.7

The region is traversed by the Pacific Highway, Bruxner Highway, Clarence Way, Summerland Way and the North Coast railway line which links Sydney to Brisbane.

=== Characteristics ===
The northernmost part of the region contains Mount Warning and the surrounding remnants of the long-extinct Tweed Volcano, portions of which extend into southern Queensland. Immediately to the south was formerly the "Big Scrub", an extensive area of subtropical rainforest that was largely cleared for timber-getting and subsequently dairy farming in the nineteenth century. The major towns of the area developed at the navigable heads of the local river systems (Murwillumbah on the Tweed, Lismore on the Wilsons – a tributary of the Richmond – and Grafton on the Clarence) rather than on the coast, in order to be able to transport the valuable timber products (in particular the Australian red cedar, Toona ciliata) to markets interstate and overseas. Dairy production in the region was extensive up until the 1970s and many towns in the area retain their dairy processing plants ("butter factories") from that era, now largely re-purposed for other uses; dairy cattle were then largely replaced with beef cattle for economic reasons, although some dairy production remains. The north of the region is an important sugarcane growing area with smaller contributions from coffee, bananas and assorted tropical fruit and vegetables. The hills with their red volcanic soils inland from Byron Bay provide Australia's main region for the cultivation of macadamia trees which are used for their production of both raw nuts and macadamia oil. Ballina is a fishing port and was a centre for Australia's east coast offshore prawn industry, although boat numbers have declined in recent years, while additional vessels operate out of Iluka and Yamba. Byron Bay was at one time a centre for commercial whaling as well as mineral extraction via sand mining. Further south, the rural portions of the Clarence river catchment are predominantly used for forestry, agriculture and grazing.

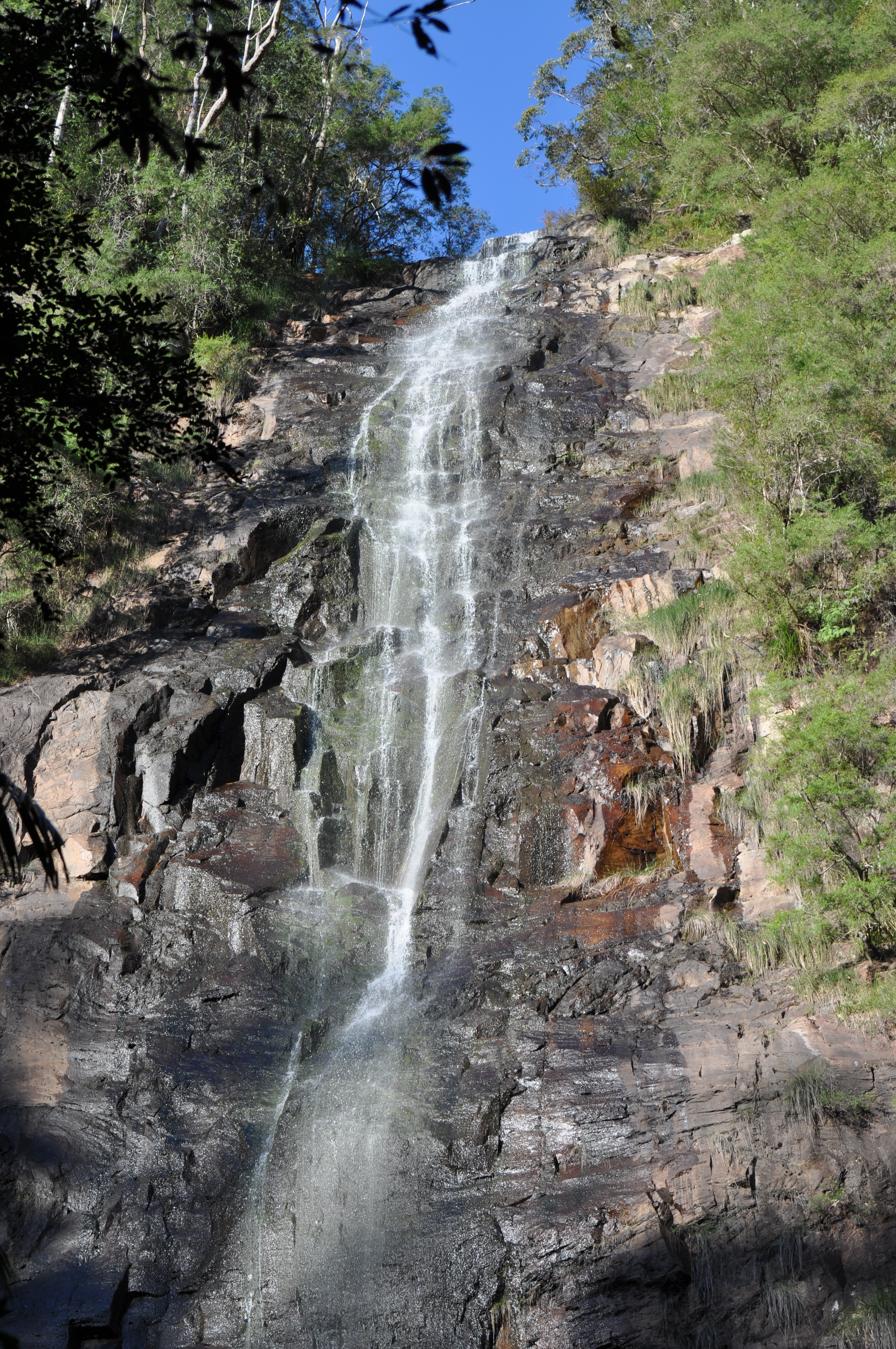
Protestors Falls in Nightcap National Park, 2013

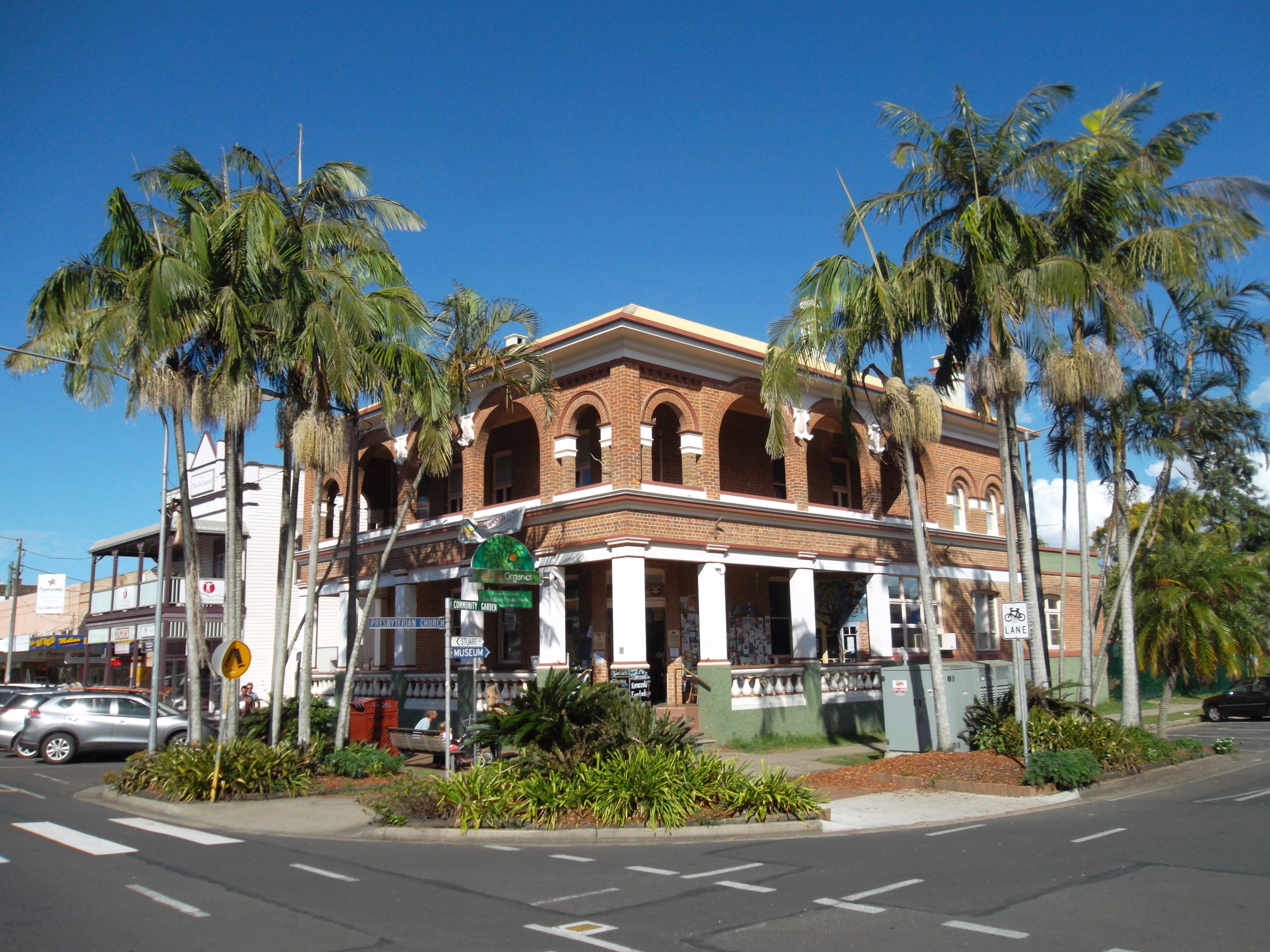
Old NSW Bank building in Mullumbimby, 2014

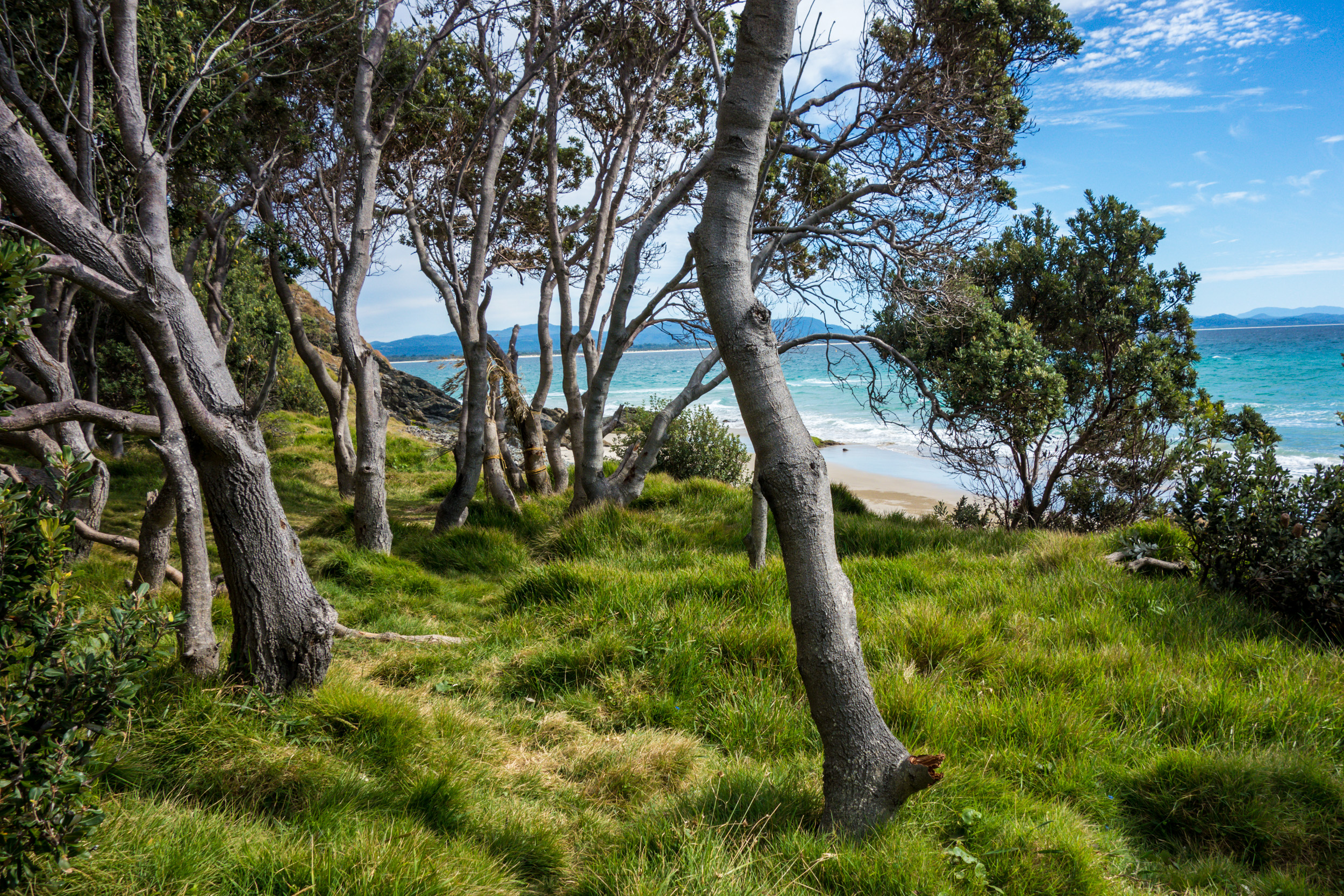
Coastal vegetation at Byron Bay, 2016

The region as a whole includes a significant component of New South Wales' state forests and national parks, and tourism is important in the north of the region in particular, especially in Tweed Heads, which is effectively a southern extension of the Gold Coast, and Byron Bay, which has developed a reputation as both a centre for relaxation and "alternative" health practices such as yoga, and at certain times of the year, a convenient out-of-town recreation area for partygoers from the major urban centres of south-east Queensland. The village of Nimbin, in the Lismore area, also attracts tourists interested in its reputation for environmental and alternative living initiatives such as permaculture, sustainability, and self-sufficiency, as well as its often-cited counterculture which includes lobbying for the decriminalisation of recreational and medicinal cannabis, as evidenced by its annual MardiGrass celebration. Following some decades of population decline with the reduction of certain primary industry (in particular dairying), the area is now seeing a population increase, in part because of the availability of ex-dairy land for newer niche crops and hobby farms along with an influx of "sea change" and "tree change" families, as well as retirees attracted by the region's subtropical climate and unique combination of lifestyle attributes.

From the 1970s onwards, the northern portion of the region has also been the scene of successful environmental protests aimed at preventing the destruction of the area's significant natural assets, including the 1979 Terania Creek anti-logging protest in the Nightcap National Park which led to the then Wran State Government gazetting remaining rainforest in New South Wales as National Parks, the 2014 Bentley blockade, which protested against exploratory drilling for gas at that location, and flow-on community reaction which eventually led to the New South Wales State Government buying back a coal seam gas exploration licence covering more than 500,000 hectares across the region in October 2015.

Prior to European settlement in the nineteenth century, the region was home to the Aboriginal Bundjalung people (or Bandjalang) (including the Widjabul of the Lismore region, the Arakwal of the Byron Bay area, and the Kalibal and Minjungbal of the Tweed and Queensland border) and the Gumbaynggirr and Yaegl peoples to the south, which collectively still form a component of the local population, and have been successful in some native title land claims on behalf of local Bandjalang and Yaegl communities.

== Education ==
The region contains the Southern Cross University, which is headquartered at Lismore and has campuses in Tweed Heads and Coffs Harbour. The North Coast Institute of TAFE has campuses at Lismore, Ballina, Casino, Grafton, Kingscliff, Maclean, Trenayr, Wollongbar and Yamba.

== Sport and recreation ==
There are several local sporting competitions, including:

- Association football – Football Far North Coast
- Baseball – Far North Coast Baseball Association
- Cricket – LJ Hooker League
- Rugby league – Northern Rivers Regional Rugby League
- Rugby union – Far North Coast Rugby Union

The region has also produced several famous sportspeople, including:

- Association football player Craig Foster
- Association football player Lisa Casagrande
- Association football player Terry Greedy
- Athlete Kerry Saxby-Junna
- Cricketers Adam Gilchrist, Lyn Larsen, Matthew Phelps, Sam Trimble, and Georgia Redmayne
- Rugby league player Ken Nagas
- Rugby union player Kane Douglas
- Rugby union player Justin Harrison
- Rugby 7s player Alex Gibbon
- Rugby union player Izack Rodda
- Rugby union player Rory Arnold
- Rugby union player Richie Arnold
- Hockey player Brent Livermore

== Sporting venues ==
Some sporting venues on the Northern Rivers includes:

- Albert Park International Baseball Stadium, Lismore
- Oakes Oval, Lismore
- Crozier Field, Lismore
- Lismore City Rugby Ground, Lismore
- Lyle Park, Wollongbar
- Don Gulley Oval, Kyogle
- Stan Paine Oval, Evans Head
- Kingsford Smith Park, Ballina
- Geoff Watt Oval, Alstonville
- Red Devil Park, Byron Bay
- Williams Reserve, Lennox Head

== Culture ==
The Northern Rivers has its own orchestras, the Northern Rivers Symphony Orchestra based in Tweed Heads and the Lismore Symphony Orchestra based in Lismore. Many of the regional centres, including Murwillumbah, Lismore and Grafton all have regional art galleries. The art gallery at Murwillumbah (the Tweed Regional Gallery) includes the Margaret Olley Art Centre named after the prominent locally-born Australian artist Margaret Olley and it includes examples of her work plus a recreation of areas of Olley's famous home studio, principally the Hat Factory and the Yellow Room.

=== History of settlement ===
The region has a history of Italian settlement. The locality of New Italy was settled in 1882 by Italian pioneers who attempted to cultivate the area's difficult interior, while additional phases of migration followed in the 1920s and again with the post-World War II influx of European migrants anxious to escape their war-ravaged country. They typically leased hilly land from local farmers on which they cultivated bananas, moving to other trades when the local banana industry declined when refrigeration and better transport links facilitated the supply of cheaper competition from Queensland.

== Transport ==
The Northern Rivers was served for over a century by the Murwillumbah railway line, although, amidst some ongoing controversy, services were suspended in 2004. Much of the former railway line has been converted into the Northern Rivers Rail Trail, a cycle path which, when complete, will connect Casino to Murwillumbah.

There are two major airports in the region including:

- The Ballina Byron Gateway Airport is the main regional airport that serves the Northern Rivers region, it is located 5 km (3 mi) north west of Ballina.
- The Gold Coast Airport which is approximately 3.6 km (2 mi) west of Tweed Heads which services the northern part of the region.

== Principal towns ==
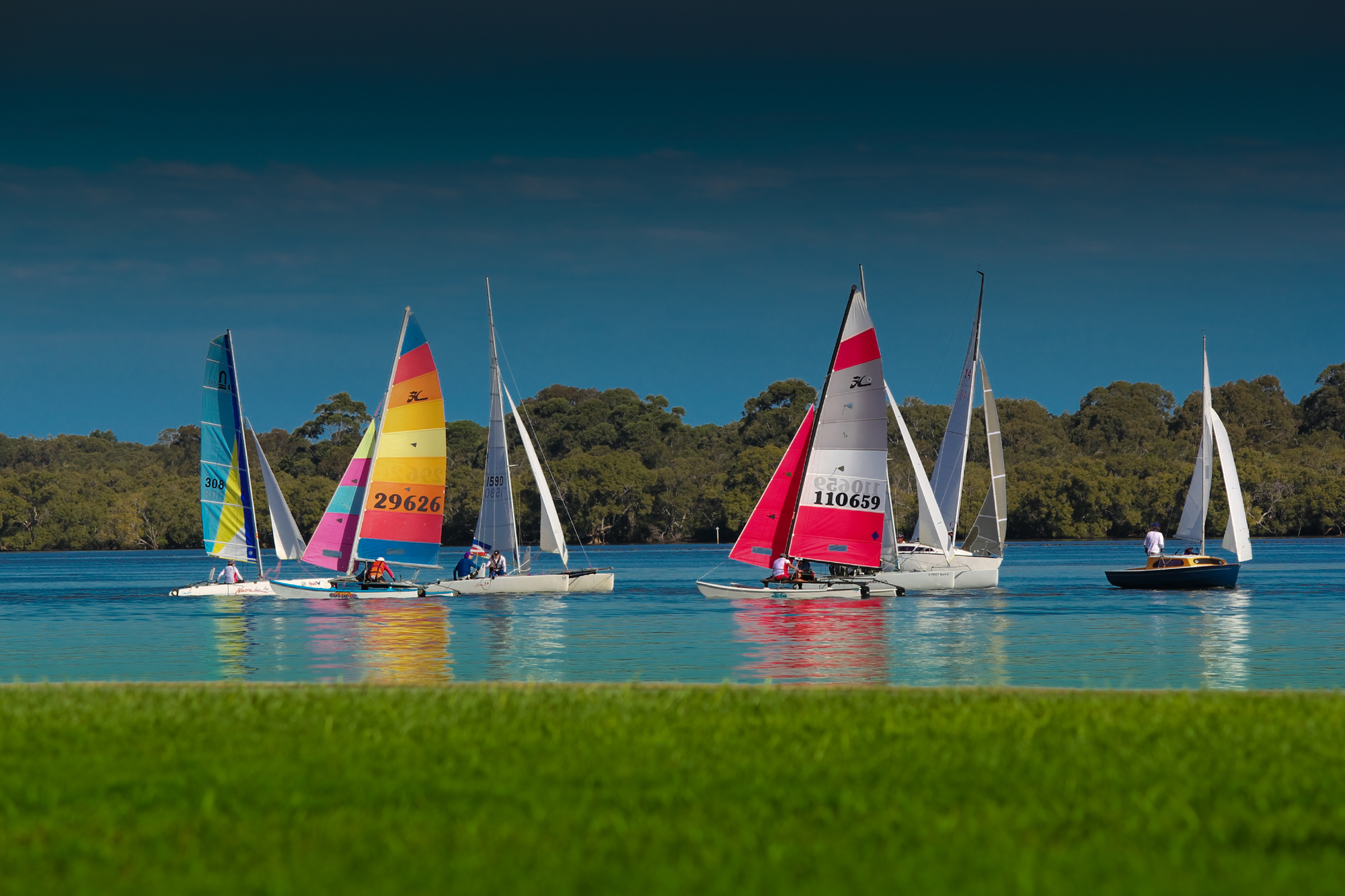
Boats on the Richmond River at Ballina

- Alstonville
- Ballina
- Bangalow
- Bogangar
- Brunswick Heads
- Byron Bay
- Casino
- Drake
- Evans Head
- Grafton
- Iluka
- Kingscliff
- Kyogle
- Lennox Head
- Lismore
- Maclean
- Mullumbimby
- Murwillumbah
- New Brighton
- Nimbin
- Nymboida
- Ocean Shores
- Pottsville
- Suffolk Park
- Tweed Heads
- Whiporie
- Wollongbar
- Yamba

== See also ==
- Regions of New South Wales
