= Electoral district of Ballina =

State electoral district of New South Wales, Australia

Ballina New South Wales—Legislative Assembly
- Interactive map of district boundaries from the 2023 state election
- State: New South Wales
- Dates current: 1894–1904; 1988–present
- MP: Tamara Smith
- Party: Greens
- Namesake: Ballina, New South Wales
- Electors: 58,971 (2023)
- Area: 1,059.16 km^{2} (408.9 sq mi)
- Demographic: Rural
Electorates around Ballina:
Lismore	Tweed	Pacific Ocean
Lismore	Ballina	Pacific Ocean
Lismore	Clarence	Pacific Ocean

Ballina is an electoral district of the Legislative Assembly in the Australian state of New South Wales.

== History ==
Ballina was originally created in 1894, when the three-member electorate of Richmond was divided into Richmond, Lismore and Ballina. In 1904, Ballina was replaced by Byron. In 1988, a recreated Ballina and Murwillumbah replaced Byron.

The 2004 redistribution of electoral districts estimated that the electoral district would have 47,246 electors on 29 April 2007. At the 2007 election it encompassed all of Ballina Shire (including Ballina, Alstonville, Lennox Head and Wollongbar) and most of the populated areas of Byron Shire (including Byron Bay, Mullumbimby, Ocean Shores, Suffolk Park, Brunswick Heads, South Golden Beach and Bangalow).

The 2013 NSW state electoral redistribution once again changed the boundaries of the electorate, so at the next election it would comprise the entire shires of Ballina and Byron.

The Greens won the seat of Ballina at the 2015 state election, bringing their lower house representation to three seats. It became the first rural seat in any Australian parliament outside Tasmania to be won by the Greens.

== Members for Ballina ==
First incarnation (1894–1904)
Member	Party	Term
John Perry	Protectionist	1894–1901
John Perry	Progressive	1901–1904
Second incarnation (1988–present)
Member	Party	Term
Don Page	National	1988–2015
Tamara Smith	Greens	2015–present

== Election results ==
2023 New South Wales state election: Ballina
Party	Candidate	Votes	%	±%
Greens	Tamara Smith	16,792	35.2	+4.0
National	Josh Booyens	14,535	30.4	−7.0
Labor	Andrew Broadley	10,880	22.8	−2.2
Independent	Kevin Loughrey	3,710	7.8	+7.8
Sustainable Australia	Peter Jenkins	1,822	3.8	+1.6
Total formal votes		47,739	97.0	−0.3
Informal votes		1,455	3.0	+0.3
Turnout		49,194	83.4	−3.7
Notional two-party-preferred count
Labor	Andrew Broadley	22,445	56.2	+2.3
National	Josh Booyens	17,492	43.8	−2.3
Two-candidate-preferred result
Greens	Tamara Smith	23,897	57.7	+2.9
National	Josh Booyens	17,506	42.3	−2.9
Greens hold		Swing	+2.9	
