= List of schools in the Northern Rivers and Mid North Coast =

This is a list of schools in the Northern Rivers and Mid North Coast regions of New South Wales, Australia. The New South Wales education system traditionally consists of primary schools, which accommodate students from Kindergarten to Year 6 (ages 5–12), and high schools, which accommodate students from Years 7 to 12 (ages 12–18).

== Public schools ==
=== Primary schools (K–6) ===
Name	Suburb	LGA	Opened
Afterlee Public School	Afterlee	Kyogle	1919
Albert Park Public School	Albert Park	Lismore	1942
Aldavilla Public School	Yarravel	Kempsey	1871
Alstonville Public School	Alstonville	Ballina	1875
Ballina Public School	Ballina	Ballina	1861
Bangalow Public School	Bangalow	Byron	1884
Banora Point Public School	Banora Point	Tweed	1893
Barkers Vale Public School	Barkers Vale	Kyogle	1933
Baryulgil Public School	Baryulgil	Clarence Valley	1917
Beechwood Public School	Beechwood	Port Macquarie	1869
Bellbrook Public School	Bellbrook	Kempsey	1883
Bellingen Public School	Bellingen	Bellingen	1870
Bexhill Public School	Bexhill	Lismore	1882
Bilambil Public School	Bilambil	Tweed	1898
Blakebrook Public School	Blakebrook	Lismore	1868
Boambee Public School	Boambee	Coffs Harbour	1902
Bobin Public School	Bobin	Greater Taree	1883
Bogangar Public School	Bogangar	Tweed	2004
Bonville Public School	Bonville	Coffs Harbour	1888
Booral Public School	Booral	Great Lakes	1865
Broadwater Public School	Broadwater	Ballina	1881
Brunswick Heads Public School	Brunswick Heads	Byron	1888
Bungwahl Public School	Bungwahl	Great Lakes	1876
Burringbar Public School	Burringbar	Byron	1894
Byron Bay Public School	Byron Bay	Byron	1892
Cabbage Tree Island Public School	Cabbage Tree Island	Ballina	1908
Caniaba Public School	Caniaba	Lismore	1912
Carool Public School	Carool	Tweed	1922
Casino Public School	Casino	Richmond Valley	1861
Casino West Public School	Casino	Richmond Valley	1952
Centaur Public School	Banora Point	Tweed	1994
The Channon Public School	The Channon	Lismore	1909
Chatham Public School	Taree	Greater Taree	1952
Chatsworth Island Public School	Chatsworth	Clarence Valley	1868
Chillingham Public School	Chillingham	Tweed	1904
Clunes Public School	Clunes	Lismore	1883
Coffee Camp Public School	Coffee Camp	Lismore	1910
Coffs Harbour Public School	Coffs Harbour	Coffs Harbour	1885
Collins Creek Public School	Collins Creek	Kyogle	1918
Comboyne Public School	Comboyne	Port Macquarie	1922
Condong Public School	Condong	Tweed	1888
Coolongolook Public School	Coolongolook	Great Lakes	1884
Coopernook Public School	Coopernook	Greater Taree	1877
Coorabell Public School	Coorabell	Byron	1891
Copmanhurst Public School	Copmanhurst	Clarence Valley	1891
Coraki Public School	Coraki	Richmond Valley	1868
Coramba Public School	Coramba	Coffs Harbour	1888
Corindi Public School	Corindi	Coffs Harbour	1884
Corndale Public School	Corndale	Lismore	1889
Coutts Crossing Public School	Coutts Crossing	Clarence Valley	1913
Cowper Public School	Cowper	Clarence Valley	1874
Crabbes Creek Public School	Crabbes Creek	Byron	1899
Crescent Head Public School	Crescent Head	Kempsey	1921
Crossmaglen Public School	Crossmaglen	Coffs Harbour	1936
Crystal Creek Public School	North Arm	Tweed	1895
Cudgen Public School	Cudgen	Tweed	1882
Cundletown Public School	Cundletown	Greater Taree	1857
Dorrigo Public School	Dorrigo	Bellingen	1895
Doubtful Creek Public School	Doubtful Creek	Kyogle	1930
Dundurrabin Public School	Dundurrabin	Clarence Valley	1904
Dungay Public School	Dungay	Tweed	1893
Dunoon Public School	Dunoon	Lismore	1884
Duranbah Public School	Duranbah	Tweed	1892
Durrumbul Public School	Durrumbul	Byron	1900
Ebor Public School	Ebor	Armidale Dumaresq	1907
Elands Public School	Elands	Greater Taree	1916
Eltham Public School	Eltham	Lismore	1884
Empire Vale Public School	Empire Vale	Ballina	1877
Eungai Public School	Eungai Creek	Nambucca	1893
Eureka Public School	Eureka	Byron	1887
Fernleigh Public School	Fernleigh	Ballina	1894
Fingal Head Public School	Fingal Head	Tweed	1913
Forster Public School	Forster	Great Lakes	1872
Frank Partridge VC Public School	Nambucca Heads	Nambucca	1989
Frederickton Public School	Frederickton	Kempsey	1877
Gillwinga Public School	South Grafton	Clarence Valley	1971
Gladstone Public School	Gladstone	Kempsey	1877
Glenreagh Public School	Glenreagh	Clarence Valley	1887
Goolmangar Public School	Goolmangar	Lismore	1882
Goonellabah Public School	Goonellabah	Lismore	1879
Goonengerry Public School	Goonengerry	Byron	1899
Grafton Public School	Grafton	Clarence Valley	1852
Green Hill Public School	Greenhill	Kempsey	1890
Gulmarrad Public School	Gulmarrad	Clarence Valley	1891
Hallidays Point Public School	Hallidays Point	Greater Taree	1994
Hannam Vale Public School	Hannam Vale	Greater Taree	1892
Harrington Public School	Harrington	Greater Taree	1872
Harwood Island Public School	Harwood	Clarence Valley	1872
Hastings Public School	Port Macquarie	Port Macquarie	1982
Hernani Public School	Hernani	Clarence Valley	1897
Herons Creek Public School	Herons Creek	Port Macquarie	1893
Huntingdon Public School	Huntingdon	Port Macquarie	1868
Iluka Public School	Iluka	Clarence Valley	1879
Jiggi Public School	Jiggi	Lismore	1899
Johns River Public School	Johns River	Greater Taree	1883
Karangi Public School	Karangi	Coffs Harbour	1892
Kempsey East Public School	East Kempsey	Kempsey	1881
Kempsey South Public School	South Kempsey	Kempsey	1960
Kempsey West Public School	West Kempsey	Kempsey	1860
Kendall Public School	Kendall	Port Macquarie	1874
Kinchela Public School	Kinchela	Kempsey	1881
Kingscliff Public School	Kingscliff	Tweed	1957
Kororo Public School	Korora	Coffs Harbour	1914
Krambach Public School	Krambach	Greater Taree	1880
Kyogle Public School	Kyogle	Kyogle	1895
Lake Cathie Public School	Bonny Hills	Port Macquarie	2015
Lansdowne Public School	Lansdowne	Greater Taree	1902
Larnook Public School	Larnook	Lismore	1922
Laurieton Public School	Laurieton	Port Macquarie	1877
Lawrence Public School	Lawrence	Clarence Valley	1868
Leeville Public School	Leeville	Richmond Valley	1888
Lennox Head Public School	Lennox Head	Ballina	1882
Lismore Heights Public School	Lismore Heights	Lismore	1956
Lismore Public School	Lismore	Lismore	1862
Lismore South Public School	South Lismore	Lismore	1915
Long Flat Public School	Long Flat	Port Macquarie	1933
Lowanna Public School	Lowanna	Coffs Harbour	1912
Macksville Public School	Macksville	Nambucca	1875
Maclean Public School	Maclean	Clarence Valley	1865
Main Arm Upper Public School	Upper Main Arm	Byron	1927
Manifold Public School	Bentley	Lismore	1929
Manning Gardens Public School	Taree	Greater Taree	1984
Medlow Public School	Medlow	Nambucca	1903
Mitchells Island Public School	Mitchells Island	Greater Taree	1869
Modanville Public School	Modanville	Lismore	1928
Moorland Public School	Moorland	Greater Taree	1882
Mount George Public School	Mount George	Greater Taree	1874
Mullaway Public School	Mullaway	Coffs Harbour	1994
Mullumbimby Public School	Mullumbimby	Byron	1886
Mummulgum Public School	Mummulgum	Kyogle	1901
Murwillumbah East Public School	Murwillumbah	Tweed	1958
Murwillumbah Public School	Murwillumbah	Tweed	1872
Nabiac Public School	Nabiac	Great Lakes	1876
Nambucca Heads Public School	Nambucca Heads	Nambucca	1884
Nana Glen Public School	Nana Glen	Coffs Harbour	1896
Narranga Public School	Coffs Harbour	Coffs Harbour	1968
Newrybar Public School	Newrybar	Ballina	1890
North Haven Public School	North Haven	Port Macquarie	1957
Nymboida Public School	Nymboida	Clarence Valley	1879
Ocean Shores Public School	Ocean Shores	Byron	1893
Old Bar Public School	Old Bar	Greater Taree	1935
Old Bonalbo Public School	Old Bonalbo	Kyogle	1920
Orama Public School	Orama	Bellingen	1890
Orara Upper Public School	Upper Orara	Coffs Harbour	1891
Pacific Palms Public School	Boomerang Beach	Great Lakes	1937
Palmers Island Public School	Palmers Island	Clarence Valley	1866
The Pocket Public School	The Pocket	Byron	1900
Port Macquarie Public School	Port Macquarie	Port Macquarie	1852
Pottsville Beach Public School	Pottsville	Tweed	1944
Raleigh Public School	Raleigh	Bellingen	1887
Rappville Public School	Rappville	Richmond Valley	1908
Repton Public School	Repton	Bellingen	1915
The Risk Public School	The Risk	Kyogle	1908
Rollands Plains Upper Public School	Upper Rollands Plains	Port Macquarie	1937
Rosebank Public School	Rosebank	Lismore	1891
Rous Public School	Rous	Ballina	1881
Rukenvale Public School	Rukenvale	Kyogle	1930
Sandy Beach Public School	Sandy Beach	Coffs Harbour	1985
Sawtell Public School	Sawtell	Coffs Harbour	1924
Scotts Head Public School	Scotts Head	Nambucca	1945
Smithtown Public School	Smithtown	Kempsey	1891
South Grafton Public School	South Grafton	Clarence Valley	1867
Southern Cross Public School	Ballina	Ballina	1971
South West Rocks Public School	South West Rocks	Kempsey	1891
Stokers Siding Public School	Stokers Siding	Tweed	1917
Stratheden Public School	Stratheden	Richmond Valley	1914
Stroud Public School	Stroud	Great Lakes	1882
Stroud Road Public School	Stroud Road	Great Lakes	1919
Stuarts Point Public School	Stuarts Point	Kempsey	1891
Tabulam Public School	Tabulam	Kyogle	1879
Tacking Point Public School	Port Macquarie	Port Macquarie	1996
Taree Public School	Taree	Greater Taree	1864
Taree West Public School	Taree	Greater Taree	1953
Telegraph Point Public School	Telegraph Point	Port Macquarie	1876
Terranora Public School	Terranora	Tweed	1906
Teven-Tintenbar Public School	Tintenbar	Ballina	1884
Tinonee Public School	Tinonee	Greater Taree	1859
Toormina Public School	Toormina	Coffs Harbour	1979
Tregeagle Public School	Tregeagle	Lismore	1890
Tucabia Public School	Tucabia	Clarence Valley	1891
Tumbulgum Public School	Tumbulgum	Tweed	1985
Tuncurry Public School	Tuncurry	Great Lakes	1881
Tuntable Creek Public School	Tuntable Creek	Lismore	1923
Tweed Heads Public School	Tweed Heads	Tweed	1876
Tweed Heads South Public School	Tweed Heads South	Tweed	1958
Tyalgum Public School	Tyalgum	Tweed	1907
Tyalla Public School	Coffs Harbour	Coffs Harbour	1978
Uki Public School	Uki	Tweed	1895
Ulmarra Public School	Ulmarra	Clarence Valley	1891
Ulong Public School	Ulong	Coffs Harbour	1914
Upper Coopers Creek Public School	Upper Coopers Creek	Byron	1949
Upper Lansdowne Public School	Upper Lansdowne	Greater Taree	1895
Urunga Public School	Urunga	Bellingen	1882
Wardell Public School	Wardell	Ballina	1867
Wauchope Public School	Wauchope	Port Macquarie	1868
Westlawn Public School	Grafton	Clarence Valley	1955
Westport Public School	Port Macquarie	Port Macquarie	1970
Whian Whian Public School	Whian Whian	Lismore	1910
Wiangaree Public School	Wiangaree	Kyogle	1908
Willawarrin Public School	Willawarrin	Kempsey	1901
William Bayldon Public School	Sawtell	Coffs Harbour	1992
Wilsons Creek Public School	Mullumbimby	Byron	1908
Wingham Public School	Wingham	Greater Taree	1864
Wingham Brush Public School	Wingham	Greater Taree	1987
Wollongbar Public School	Wollongbar	Ballina	1900
Woodburn Public School	Woodburn	Lismore	1871
Woodford Dale Public School	Woodford Island	Clarence Valley	1867
Woolgoolga Public School	Woolgoolga	Coffs Harbour	1884
Wooli Public School	Wooli	Clarence Valley	1942
Wyrallah Public School	Wyrallah	Lismore	1867
Wyrallah Road Public School	East Lismore	Lismore	1955
Yamba Public School	Yamba	Clarence Valley	1868
Yarrowitch Public School	Yarrowitch	Armidale	

=== High schools ===
In New South Wales, a high school generally covers Years 7 to 12 in the education system, and a central or community school, intended to provide comprehensive education in a rural district, covers Kindergarten to Year 12. An additional class of high schools has emerged in recent years as a result of amalgamations which have produced multi-campus colleges consisting of Junior and Senior campuses.

While most schools are comprehensive and take in all students of high school age living within its defined school boundaries, some schools are either specialist in a given Key Learning Area, or selective in that they set examinations or other performance criteria for entrance. Grafton High School is the only selective school in the Northern Rivers region.

Name	Suburb	LGA	Opened
Alstonville High School	Alstonville	Ballina	1986
Ballina Coast High School	Ballina	Ballina	2018
Banora Point High School	Banora Point	Tweed	2004
Bellingen High School	Bellingen	Bellingen	1960
Bonalbo Central School	Bonalbo	Kyogle	1911
Bowraville Central School	Bowraville	Nambucca	1872
Bulahdelah Central School	Bulahdelah	Great Lakes	1878
Byron Bay High School	Byron Bay	Byron	1987
Camden Haven High School	Laurieton	Port Macquarie	2000
Casino High School	Casino	Richmond Valley	1945
Chatham High School	Taree	Greater Taree	1965
Coffs Harbour High School	Coffs Harbour	Coffs Harbour	1939
Coffs Harbour Senior College	Coffs Harbour	Coffs Harbour	1995
Dorrigo High School	Dorrigo	Bellingen	1968
Evans River Community School	Evans Head	Richmond Valley	1920
Grafton High School	Grafton	Clarence Valley	1912
Great Lakes College (Forster Campus)	Forster	Great Lakes	1978
Great Lakes College (Tuncurry Junior Campus)	Tuncurry	Great Lakes	2003
Great Lakes College (Tuncurry Senior Campus)	Tuncurry	Great Lakes	2003
Hastings Secondary College (Port Macquarie Campus)	Port Macquarie	Port Macquarie	1962
Hastings Secondary College (Westport Campus)	Port Macquarie	Port Macquarie	1981
Hunter River High School	Raymond Terrace	Port Stephens	
Irrawang High School	Raymond Terrace	Port Stephens	1983
Kadina High School	Goonellabah	Lismore	1977
Kempsey High School	Kempsey	Kempsey	1930
Kingscliff High School	Kingscliff	Tweed	1986
Kyogle High School	Kyogle	Kyogle	1955
Lismore High School	Lismore	Lismore	1920
Macksville High School	Macksville	Nambucca	1950
Maclean High School	Maclean	Clarence Valley	1961
Melville High School	South Kempsey	Kempsey	1983
Mullumbimby High School	Mullumbimby	Byron	1955
Murwillumbah High School	Murwillumbah	Tweed	1929
Nambucca Heads High School	Nambucca Heads	Nambucca	1992
Nimbin Central School	Nimbin	Lismore	1891
Orara High School	Coffs Harbour	Coffs Harbour	1971
Richmond River High School	North Lismore	Lismore	1958
South Grafton High School	South Grafton	Clarence Valley	1964
Taree High School	Taree	Greater Taree	1925
Toormina High School	Toormina	Coffs Harbour	1980
Tweed River High School	Tweed Heads South	Tweed	1961
Wauchope High School	Wauchope	Port Macquarie	1954
Wingham High School	Wingham	Greater Taree	1963
Wollumbin High School	Murwillumbah	Tweed	1995
Woodenbong Central School	Woodenbong	Kyogle	1908
Woolgoolga High School	Woolgoolga	Coffs Harbour	1981

=== Special schools ===
Special schools are public schools designed for children or youth with chronic disabilities or who for other reasons cannot be accommodated in the comprehensive school system.

Name	Suburb	LGA	Opened
Caldera School	Tweed Heads South	Tweed	2001
Cascade Environmental Education Centre	Cascade	Bellingen	1989
Coffs Harbour Learning Centre	Coffs Harbour	Coffs Harbour	2007
Induna School	South Grafton	Clarence Valley	1999
North East Public School of Distance Education	Port Macquarie	Port Macquarie	2004
Southern Cross Distance Education Centre	East Ballina	Ballina	2000
Wilson Park School	Lismore	Lismore	1978

=== Defunct primary schools ===
Name	Suburb/Town	LGA	Opened	Closed
Allworth Public School	Allworth	Great Lakes	1898	1943
Alumny Creek Public School	Alumy Creek	Clarence Valley	1872	1969
Angowrie Public School	Angourie	Clarence Valley	1895	1899
Backmede Public School	Backmede	Richmond Valley	1886	1969
Bagnoo Public School	Bagnoo	Port Macquarie	1916	1963
Bagotville Public School	Bagotville	Ballina	1914	1965
Batar Public School	Batar	Port Macquarie	1948	1965
Bellangry Public School	Bellangry	Port Macquarie	1904	1967
Bellimbopinni Public School	Bellimbopinni	Kempsey	1865	2014
Bellwood Aboriginal School	Nambucca Heads	Nambucca	1916	1966
Belmore River Public School	Belmore River	Kempsey	1867	1972
Belmore River Upper Public School	Belmore River	Kempsey	1889	1969
Billys Creek Public School	Billys Creek	Clarence Valley	1946	1963
Blackmans Point Public School	Blackmans Point	Port Macquarie	1877	1962
Blue Knob Public School	Blue Knob	Lismore	1914	1965
Boggumbil Public School	near Goolmangar	Lismore	1887	1945
Bohnock Public School	Bohnock	Greater Taree	1893	1968
Booerie Public School	Booerie	Lismore	1892	1955
Boolambayte Public School	Boolambayte	Great Lakes	1865	1957
Boorabee Park Public School	Boorabee Park	Richmond Valley	1904	1991
Bora Ridge Public School	Bora Ridge	Richmond Valley	1900	1974
Bostobrick Public School	Bostobrick	Bellingen	1918	1970
Bottle Creek Public School	Bottle Creek	Kyogle	1913	1958
Brays Creek Public School	Brays Creek	Tweed	1912	1977
Brierfield Public School	Brierfield	Bellingen	1894	1968
Brinawa Public School	Brinawa	Greater Taree	1930	1962
Broken Head Public School	Broken Head	Byron	1918	1975
Brombin Public School	Pappinbarra	Port Macquarie	1905	1965
Brooklana Public School	Brooklana	Coffs Harbour	1920	1949
Brooklet Public School	Brooklet	Ballina	1887	1964
Bucca Central Public School	Bucca	Coffs Harbour	1910	1963
Bucca Lower Public School	Bucca	Coffs Harbour	1896	1978
Buckendoon Public School	Buckendoon	Lismore	1882	1954
Bulingary Public School	Bulingary	Nambucca	1939	1968
Bundgeam Public School	Bundgeam	Kyogle	1912	1978
Bungawalbyn Public School	Bungawalbin	Richmond Valley	1877	1965
Burnt Bridge Aboriginal School	Burnt Bridge	Kempsey	1905	1968
Burraduc Public School	Burraduc	Great Lakes	1882	1894
Burrapine Public School	Burrapine	Nambucca	1901	1967
Burringbar Upper Public School	Burringbar	Byron	1924	1975
Busbys Flat Public School	Busbys Flat	Richmond Valley	1913	1965
Byabarra Public School	Byabarra	Port Macquarie	1895	2012
Byangum Public School	Byangum	Tweed	1885	1918
Calliope Public School	Calliope	Clarence Valley	1890	1983
Camira Creek Public School	Camira Creek	Richmond Valley	1910	1969
Capeen Public School	Capeen	Kyogle	1939	1972
Carcolla Public School	Carcolla	Kempsey	1942	1967
Carrs Creek Public School	Carrs Creek	Clarence Valley	1877	1964
Cascade Public School	Cascade	Bellingen	1926	1975
Casino North Public School	Casino	Richmond Valley	1913	1965
Cave Point School	Fingal Head	Tweed	1895	1899
Cawongla Public School	Cawongla	Kyogle	1911	1975
Cedar Butt Public School	Cedar Butt	Nambucca	1910	1958
Cedar Party Public School	Cedar Party	Greater Taree	1883	1968
Clarence Valley Special School	Grafton	Clarence Valley	1962	1988
Clearfield Public School	Clearfield	Richmond Valley	1921	1940
Clothiers Creek Public School	Clothiers Creek	Tweed	1939	1968
Clouds Creek Public School	Clouds Creek	Clarence Valley	1943	1964
Clovass Public School	Clovass	Richmond Valley	1900	1982
Clybucca Public School	Clybucca	Kempsey	1885	1970
Coalcroft Public School	Coaldale	Clarence Valley	1875	1971
Codrington Public School	Codrington	Richmond Valley	1872	1978
Coldstream Lower Public School	Coldstream	Clarence Valley	1873	1966
College Street Special School	East Lismore	Lismore	1956	1978
Collombatti Public School	Collombatti	Kempsey	1894	1951
Collombatti Rail Public School	Collombatti Rail	Kempsey	1909	2001
Comara Public School	Comara	Kempsey	1897	1983
Comboyne East Public School	Comboyne	Port Macquarie	1911	1968
Comboyne West Public School	Comboyne	Port Macquarie	1905	1975
Coombell Public School	Coombell	Richmond Valley	1920	1985
Copmanhurst Upper Public School	Copmanhurst	Clarence Valley	1866	1938
Coraki Aboriginal School	Coraki	Richmond Valley	1908	1945
Coralville Public School	Coralville	Greater Taree	1905	1965
Corindi Creek Public School	Corindi	Coffs Harbour	1920	1962
Cougal Public School	Cougal	Kyogle	1927	1962
Crabbes Creek Upper Public School	Crabbes Creek	Byron	1953	1966
Crawford River Public School	Crawford River	Great Lakes	1875	1954
Crowdy Head Public School	Crowdy Head	Greater Taree	1902	2014
Crystal Creek Upper Public School	North Arm	Tweed	1912	1968
Cudgera Public School	Cudgera Creek	Tweed	1907	1975
Dalwood Public School	Dalwood	Ballina	1891	1926
Deer Vale Public School	Deer Vale	Bellingen	1920	1965
Dellward Public School	near Lorne	Port Macquarie	1910	1975
Dobies Bight Public School	Dobies Bight	Richmond Valley	1907	1964
Dondingalong Public School	Dondingalong	Kempsey	1865	1965
Doon Doon Public School	Doon Doon	Tweed	1914	1969
Dorrigo North Public School	Dorrigo	Bellingen	1893	1970
Dorroughby Public School	Dorroughby	Lismore	1886	1973
Dumaresq Island Public School	Dumaresq Island	Greater Taree	1863	1973
Dunbible Public School	Dunbible	Tweed	1893	1943
Dungarubba Public School	Dungarubba	Lismore	1887	1988
Dyers Crossing Public School	Dyers Crossing	Greater Taree	1936	1969
Dyraaba Lower Public School	Dyraaba	Richmond Valley	1933	1966
Dyraaba Public School	Dyraaba	Richmond Valley	1925	1971
Eatonsville Public School	Eatonsville	Clarence Valley	1881	1961
Eden Creek Public School	Eden Creek	Kyogle	1913	1969
Eden Creek Upper Public School	Upper Eden Creek	Kyogle	1927	1969
Edenville Public School	Edenville	Kyogle	1918	1966
Ellangowan Public School	Ellangowan	Richmond Valley	1903	2014
Ellenborough Public School	Ellenborough	Port Macquarie	1912	1971
Ettrick Public School	Ettrick	Kyogle	1912	1968
Eungai Railway Public School	Eungai Creek	Nambucca	1922	1974
Eungella Public School	Eungella	Tweed	1896	1969
Euroka Public School	Euroka	Kempsey	1863	1968
Ewingsdale Public School	Ewingsdale	Byron	1895	1976
Failford Public School	Failford	Great Lakes	1886	1963
Fairy Hill Public School	Fairy Hill	Richmond Valley	1895	1979
Federal Public School	Federal	Byron	1896	1978
Fernmount Public School	Fernmount	Bellingen	1871	1963
Fernvale Public School	Fernvale	Tweed	1916	1976
Findon Creek Public School	Findon Creek	Kyogle	1953	1969
Five Day Creek Upper Public School	Five Day Creek Upper	Kempsey	1919	1962
Forbes River Public School	Forbes River	Port Macquarie	1928	1978
Georgica Public School	Georgica	Lismore	1912	1961
Ghinni Ghinni Public School	Ghinni Ghinni	Greater Taree	1861	2009
Gilletts Ridge Public School	Gilletts Ridge	Clarence Valley	1901	1971
Girvan Public School	Girvan	Great Lakes	1886	1957
Glenferneigh Public School	Glenferneigh	Clarence Valley	1928	1967
Glengarrie Public School	Glengarrie	Tweed	1949	1968
Gleniffer Public School	Gleniffer	Bellingen	1899	1969
Glenwarrin Public School	Glenwarrin	Greater Taree	1917	1969
Green Pigeon Public School	Green Pigeon	Kyogle	1928	1975
Greenridge Public School	Greenridge	Richmond Valley	1871	1974
Grevillia Public School	Grevillia	Kyogle	1922	2010
Gum Scrub Public School	Gum Scrub	Port Macquarie	1887	1962
Gundurimba Public School	Gundurimba	Lismore	1868	1963
Gundurimba South Public School	South Gundurimba	Lismore	1874	1967
Hacks Ferry Public School	Hacks Ferry	Port Macquarie	1929	1957
The Hatch Public School	The Hatch	Port Macquarie	1895	1967
Hibbard Public School	Hibbard	Port Macquarie	1893	1970
Hogarth Range Public School	Hogarth Range	Richmond Valley	1928	1967
Homeleigh Public School	Homeleigh	Kyogle	1917	1968
Horseshoe Creek Public School	Horseshoe Creek	Kyogle	1903	1969
Horseshoe Creek Upper Public School	Upper Horseshoe Creek	Kyogle	1932	1970
Huonbrook Public School	Huonbrook	Byron	1921	1962
Hydes Creek Public School	Hydes Creek	Bellingen	1914	1966
Innesview Public School	Innes View	Port Macquarie	1937	1961
Iron Pot Creek Public School	Iron Pot Creek	Kyogle	1922	1972
Irvington Public School	Irvington	Richmond Valley	1885	1933
Jerseyville Public School	Jerseyville	Kempsey	1883	1971
Jones Island Public School	Jones Island	Greater Taree	1863	1975
Keerrong Public School	Keerrong	Lismore	1897	1976
Ketelghay Public School	Ketelghay	Nambucca	1916	1965
Kew Public School	Kew	Port Macquarie	1883	1967
Killabakh Public School	Killabakh	Greater Taree	1888	1980
Kinchela Aboriginal School	Kinchela	Kempsey	1942	1962
Kinchela Creek Public School	Kinchela	Kempsey	1874	1963
Kindee Public School	Kindee	Port Macquarie	1901	1969
Kippax Public School	Kippax	Greater Taree	1917	1961
Knockrow Public School	Knockrow	Ballina	1901	1947
Kolodong Public School	Kolodong	Greater Taree	1859	1964
Konorigan Public School	Koonorigan	Lismore	1911	1975
Koorainghat Public School	Koorainghat	Greater Taree	1893	1956
Kundabung Public School	Kundabung	Kempsey	1909	1967
Kungala Public School	Kungala	Clarence Valley	1926	1977
Kunghur Public School	Kunghur	Tweed	1922	1969
Kyogle South Public School	Kyogle	Kyogle	1906	1964
Langley Vale Public School	Langley Vale	Greater Taree	1902	1965
Lansdowne Central Public School	Lansdowne	Greater Taree	1885	1971
Lawrence Lower Public School	Lawrence	Clarence Valley	1883	1955
Leigh Public School	Leigh	Bellingen	1909	1967
Leycester Public School	Leycester	Lismore	1954	1979
Lillian Rock Public School	Lillian Rock	Lismore	1924	1973
Limeburners Creek Public School	Limeburners Creek	Great Lakes	1877	1966
Limpinwood Public School	Limpinwood	Tweed	1910	1974
Lindendale Public School	Lindendale	Lismore	1890	1956
Loadstone Public School	Loadstone	Kyogle	1948	1967
Lorne Public School	Lorne	Port Macquarie	1885	1975
Lynchs Creek Public School	Lynchs Creek	Kyogle	1915	1965
Mallanganee Public School	Mallanganee	Kyogle	1906	2009
Manning Valley Special School	Taree	Greater Taree	1974	1983
Markwell Public School	Markwell	Great Lakes	1874	1962
Marlee Public School	Marlee	Greater Taree	1869	1974
Marom Creek Public School	Marom Creek	Ballina	1914	1975
McKees Hill Public School	McKees Hill	Lismore	1887	1976
McLeans Ridges Public School	McLeans Ridges	Ballina	1874	1969
Meerschaum Vale Public School	Meerschaum Vale	Ballina	1886	1975
Megan Public School	Megan	Bellingen	1913	1971
Middle Pocket Public School	Middle Pocket	Byron	1927	1968
Midginbil Public School	Midginbil	Tweed	1911	1969
Millbank Public School	Millbank	Kempsey	1891	2017
Millingarie Public School	near Marlee	Greater Taree	1906	1973
Minimbah Public School	Minimbah	Great Lakes	1925	1964
Missabotti Public School	Missabotti	Nambucca	1893	1963
Missabotti Upper Public School	Missabotti	Nambucca	1922	1962
Mongogarie Upper Public School	Upper Mongogarie	Richmond Valley	1936	1958
Mooball Public School	Mooball	Tweed	1912	1973
Mooral Creek Public School	Mooral Creek	Greater Taree	1914	1962
Mororo Public School	Mororo	Clarence Valley	1886	1939
Mortons Creek Public School	Mortons Creek	Port Macquarie	1929	1973
Mount Burrell Public School	Mount Burrell	Tweed	1915	1963
Mount Lion Public School	Mount Lion	Kyogle	1956	1975
Mount Seaview Public School	Mount Seaview	Port Macquarie	1955	1971
Mount Warning Public School	Mount Warning	Tweed	1918	1955
Mullumbimby Creek Public School	Mullumbimby Creek	Byron	1900	1964
Mungay Creek Public School	Mungay Creek	Kempsey	1898	1965
Murwillumbah South Infants School	Murwillumbah South	Tweed	1954	2017
Myall Upper Public School	Upper Myall	Great Lakes	1871	1964
Myocum Public School	Myocum	Byron	1903	1973
Nashua Public School	Nashua	Byron	1892	1976
Naughtons Gap Public School	Naughtons Gap	Richmond Valley	1896	1967
New Italy Public School	New Italy	Richmond Valley	1885	1933
Newee Creek Public School	Newee Creek	Nambucca	1943	1966
Nobbys Creek Public School	Nobbys Creek	Tweed	1917	1975
Nulla Creek Aboriginal School	Nulla Nulla	Kempsey	1904	1975
Nulla Nulla Public School	Nulla Nulla	Kempsey	1910	1966
Numinbah Public School	Numinbah	Tweed	1913	1962
Numulgi Public School	Numulgi	Lismore	1891	2005
Opossum Creek Public School	Possum Creek	Byron	1899	1963
Oxley Island Public School	Oxley Island	Greater Taree	1862	2018
Palmers Channel Public School	Palmers Channel	Clarence Valley	1869	1975
Pampoolah Public School	Pampoolah	Greater Taree	1852	1973
Pappinbarra Junction Public School	Pappinbarra	Port Macquarie	1932	1967
Pearces Creek Public School	Pearces Creek	Lismore	1884	2009
Pembrooke Public School	Pembrooke	Port Macquarie	1909	1975
Piggabeen Public School	Piggabeen	Tweed	1911	1974
Pimlico Public School	Pimlico	Ballina	1886	1967
Piora Public School	Piora	Richmond Valley	1908	1963
Pumpenbil Public School	Pumpenbil	Tweed	1910	1977
Rainbow Beach Public School	Rainbow Beach	Kempsey	1869	1967
Rawdon Island Public School	Rawdon Island	Port Macquarie	1876	1976
Rawson River Public School	Rawson River	Greater Taree	1884	1972
Repentance Creek Public School	Repentance Creek	Byron	1904	1964
Reserve Creek Public School	Reserve Creek	Tweed	1911	1973
Richmond Hill Public School	Richmond Hill	Lismore	1906	1969
Rileys Hill Public School	Rileys Hill	Richmond Valley	1893	1975
Rock Valley Public School	Rock Valley	Lismore	1889	1975
Rocks Crossing Public School	Rocks Crossing	Greater Taree	1936	1976
Rollands Plains Public School	Rollands Plains	Port Macquarie	1881	1965
Rosenthal Public School	Rosenthal	Great Lakes	1884	1947
Round Mountain Public School	Round Mountain	Tweed	1919	1975
Rous Mill Public School	Rous Mill	Ballina	1892	1960
Ruthven Public School	Ruthven	Lismore	1883	1974
Seelands Public School	Seelands	Clarence Valley	1889	1967
Shannon Brook Public School	Shannon Brook	Richmond Valley	1882	1975
Shark Creek Public School	Shark Creek	Clarence Valley	1877	1927
Sherwood Public School	Sherwood	Kempsey	1869	1968
Smalls Forest Public School	Lavadia	Clarence Valley	1885	1971
South Arm Public School	South Arm	Clarence Valley	1871	1967
South Ballina Public School	South Ballina	Ballina	1907	1946
Southgate Public School	Southgate	Clarence Valley	1867	1875
Spring Grove Public School	Spring Grove	Richmond Valley	1906	1958
Stewarts River Public School	Stewarts River	Greater Taree	1900	1969
Stockyard Creek Public School	Stockyard Creek	Clarence Valley	1882	1895
Stony Chute Public School	Stony Chute	Lismore	1922	1971
Swan Creek Public School	Swan Creek	Clarence Valley	1870	1994
Tabulam Aboriginal School	Tabulam	Kyogle	1938	1967
Talarm Public School	Talarm	Nambucca	1911	1960
Tarkeeth Public School	Tarkeeth	Bellingen	1923	1972
Taylors Arm Public School	Taylors Arm	Nambucca	1883	1975
Terania Creek Public School	Terania Creek	Lismore	1915	1965
Teven Public School	Teven	Ballina	1886	1988
Tewinga Public School	Tewinga	Nambucca	1915	1975
Theresa Creek Public School	Theresa Creek	Kyogle	1936	1969
Thora Public School	Thora	Bellingen	1885	1947
Thumb Creek Public School	Thumb Creek	Nambucca	1948	1960
Timmsvale Public School	Timmsvale	Coffs Harbour	1928	1970
Tomewin Public School	Tomewin	Tweed	1920	1926
Tomki Lower Public School	Tomki	Richmond Valley	1911	1926
Toms Creek Public School	Toms Creek	Port Macquarie	1939	1968
Tooloom Public School	Tooloom	Kyogle	1922	1961
Toonumbah Public School	Toonumbar	Kyogle	1938	1964
Topi Topi Public School	Topi Topi	Great Lakes	1895	1962
Trenayr Public School	Trenayr	Clarence Valley	1901	1970
Tucki Tucki Public School	Tucki Tucki	Lismore	1871	1985
Tuckombil Public School	Tuckombil	Ballina	1884	1966
Tuckurimba Public School	Tuckurimba	Lismore	1891	1975
Tullera Public School	Tullera	Lismore	1890	1945
Tullymorgan Public School	Tullymorgan	Clarence Valley	1886	1971
Tuncester Public School	Tuncester	Lismore	1875	1972
Tuncester Special School	Tuncester	Lismore	1973	1979
Tunglebung Public School	Tunglebung	Kyogle	1932	1973
Tuntable Falls Public School	Tuntable Creek	Lismore	1924	1956
Turners Flat Public School	Turners Flat	Kempsey	1870	1965
Tyalgum Creek Upper Public School	Tyalgum Creek	Tweed	1938	1963
Tyndale Public School	Tyndale	Clarence Valley	1868	1975
Ulgundahi Island Aboriginal School	near Maclean	Clarence Valley	1908	1951
Uralba Public School	Uralba	Ballina	1890	1967
Utungun Public School	Utungun	Nambucca	1894	1947
Valery Public School	Valery	Bellingen	1909	1960
Valla Beach Public School	Valla Beach	Nambucca	1960	1975
Valla Public School	Valla	Nambucca	1879	1969
Viewmont Public School	Viewmont	Nambucca	1914	1971
Waitui Public School	Waitui	Greater Taree	1933	1966
Wang Wauk Public School	Wang Wauk	Great Lakes	1892	1959
Warbro Public School	Warbro	Kempsey	1891	1972
Warrell Creek Public School	Warrell Creek	Nambucca	1889	1978
Wherrol Flat Public School	Wherrol Flat	Greater Taree	1862	1972
Whiporie Public School	Whiporie	Richmond Valley	1892	1971
Wittitrin Public School	Wittitrin	Kempsey	1901	1953
Woodenbong Aboriginal School	Woodenbong	Kyogle	1925	1964
Woodford Leigh Public School	Woodford Leigh	Clarence Valley	1869	1956
Woodview Public School	Woodview	Richmond Valley	1901	1975
Woolners Arm Public School	Woolners Arm	Kyogle	1923	1974
Woombah Public School	Woombah	Clarence Valley	1872	1953
Wootton Public School	Wootton	Great Lakes	1912	1978
Wooyung Public School	Wooyung	Tweed	1920	1972
Wyan Creek Public School	Wyan	Richmond Valley	1951	1958
Wyan Public School	Wyan	Richmond Valley	1904	1984
Yalbillinga Special School	Coffs Harbour	Coffs Harbour	1965	1993
Yarrahappini Public School	Yarrahapinni	Kempsey	1893	1972
Yarranbella Public School	Yarranbella	Nambucca	1911	1972
Yarras Public School	Yarras	Port Macquarie	1916	2004
Yeagerton Public School	Yeagerton	Lismore	1886	1968
Yelgun Public School	Yelgun	Byron	1947	1965
Yorklea Public School	Yorklea	Richmond Valley	1894	1972

== Private schools ==
=== Catholic primary schools ===
In New South Wales, Catholic primary schools are usually (but not always) linked to a parish. Prior to the 1970s, most schools were founded by religious institutes, but with the decrease in membership of these institutes, together with major reforms inside the church, lay teachers and administrators began to take over the schools, a process which completed by approximately 1995. The Lismore Diocese covers most schools in the two regions, with the Maitland-Newcastle-Diocese handling schools in the Greater Taree and Great Lakes LGAs. The Catholic Education Office (CEO) in each diocese is responsible for coordinating administration, curriculum and policy across the Catholic school system. Preference for enrolment is given to Catholic students from the parish or local area, although non-Catholic students are admitted if room is available.

Name	Suburb	LGA	Opened
Holy Family Catholic Primary School	Skennars Head	Ballina	1997
Holy Name Primary School	Forster	Great Lakes	1961
Mary Help of Christians Primary School	Toormina	Coffs Harbour	1978
Mount St John's Primary School	Dorrigo	Bellingen	1924
Mount St Patrick Primary School	Murwillumbah	Tweed	1904
Our Lady Help of Christians Primary School	South Lismore	Lismore	1917
St Agnes' Primary School	Port Macquarie	Port Macquarie	1982
St Ambrose's Primary School	Pottsville	Tweed	2015
St Anthony's Primary School	Kingscliff	Tweed	1968
St Augustine's Primary School	Coffs Harbour	Coffs Harbour	1913
St Brigid's Primary School	Kyogle	Kyogle	1906
St Carthage's Primary School	Lismore	Lismore	1886
St Finbarr's Primary School	Byron Bay	Byron	1913
St Francis Xavier's Primary School	Ballina	Ballina	1892
St Francis Xavier's Primary School	Woolgoolga	Coffs Harbour	1994
St James Primary School	Banora Point	Tweed	1994
St James Primary School	Yamba	Clarence Valley	1995
St John's Primary School	Mullumbimby	Byron	1910
St Joseph's Primary School	Alstonville	Ballina	1919
St Joseph's Primary School	Bulahdelah	Great Lakes	1955
St Joseph's Primary School	Coraki	Richmond Valley	1896
St Joseph's Primary School	Kempsey	Kempsey	1884
St Joseph's Primary School	Laurieton	Port Macquarie	1951
St Joseph's Primary School	Maclean	Clarence Valley	1897
St Joseph's Primary School	Murwillumbah South	Tweed	1970
St Joseph's Primary School	Port Macquarie	Port Macquarie	1913
St Joseph's Primary School	South Grafton	Clarence Valley	1888
St Joseph's Primary School	Taree	Greater Taree	1923
St Joseph's Primary School	Tweed Heads	Tweed	1917
St Joseph's Primary School	Wauchope	Port Macquarie	1928
St Joseph's Primary School	Wingham	Greater Taree	1901
St Joseph's Primary School	Woodburn	Richmond Valley	1912
St Mary's Primary School	Bellingen	Bellingen	1911
St Mary's Primary School	Bowraville	Nambucca	1904
St Mary's Primary School	Casino	Richmond Valley	1887
St Mary's Primary School	Grafton	Clarence Valley	1867
St Patrick's Primary School	Macksville	Nambucca	1918
St Peter's Primary School	Port Macquarie	Port Macquarie	1993

=== Catholic high schools ===
Name	Suburb	LGA	Opened
John Paul College	Coffs Harbour	Coffs Harbour	1983
Mackillop College	Port Macquarie	Port Macquarie	1988
McAuley Catholic College	Clarenza	Clarence Valley	1990
Mount Saint Patrick College	Murwillumbah	Tweed	1963
Newman Senior Technical College	Port Macquarie	Port Macquarie	1979
St Clare's High School	Taree	Greater Taree	1971
St John's College	Woodlawn	Lismore	1931
St Joseph's College	Banora Point	Tweed	1993
St Joseph's Regional College	Thrumster	Port Macquarie	1969
St Mary's High School	Casino	Richmond Valley	1946
St Paul's College	Kempsey	Kempsey	1980
Trinity Catholic College	Lismore	Lismore	1985
Xavier Catholic College	Skennars Head	Ballina	2000

=== Other private schools ===
Name	Suburb	LGA	Category
Aetaomah School	Terragon	Tweed	Steiner
Bhaktivedanta Swami Gurukula	Eungella	Tweed	Hare Krishna
Bishop Druitt College	North Boambee Valley	Coffs Harbour	Anglican
Blue Hills College	Goonellabah	Lismore	Adventist
Byron Community Primary School	Byron Bay	Byron	Independent
Cape Byron Rudolf Steiner School	Ewingsdale	Byron	Steiner
Casino Christian Community School	Casino	Richmond Valley	Presbyterian
Casuarina School for Steiner Education	Coffs Harbour	Coffs Harbour	Steiner
Chrysalis School for Steiner Education	Darkwood	Bellingen	Steiner
Clarence Valley Anglican School	Grafton	Clarence Valley	Anglican
Coffs Coast Alesco School	Coffs Harbour	Coffs Harbour	Alternative
Coffs Harbour Bible Church School	Toormina	Coffs Harbour	Baptist
Coffs Harbour Christian Community School	Bonville	Coffs Harbour	Baptist
Emmanuel Anglican College	Ballina	Ballina	Anglican
Heritage Christian School	Port Macquarie	Port Macquarie	Ind. Christian
Kempsey Adventist School	South Kempsey	Kempsey	Adventist
Lindisfarne Anglican Grammar School	Terranora	Tweed	Anglican
Lindisfarne Anglican Grammar School (Junior)	Tweed Heads South	Tweed	Anglican
Macksville Adventist School	Macksville	Nambucca	Adventist
Macleay Vocational College	Kempsey	Kempsey	Independent
Manning Adventist School	Tinonee	Greater Taree	Adventist
Manning Valley Anglican College	Cundletown	Greater Taree	Anglican
Mullumbimby Christian School	Mullumbimby	Byron	Presbyterian
Nautilus Senior College	Port Macquarie	Port Macquarie	Alternative
Nambucca Valley Christian Community School	Nambucca Heads	Nambucca	Presbyterian
Pacific Coast Christian School	Tweed Heads South	Tweed	Christian
Pacific Hope School	Tweed Heads South	Tweed	Christian
Pacific Valley Christian School	Townsend	Clarence Valley	Christian
Port Macquarie Adventist School	Port Macquarie	Port Macquarie	Adventist
Port Macquarie Steiner School	Port Macquarie	Port Macquarie	Steiner
Rainbow Ridge School	Lillian Rock	Lismore	Steiner
Sathya SAI School	Murwillumbah	Tweed	Sathya Sai Baba
Shearwater Steiner School	Mullumbimby	Byron	Steiner
Sherwood Cliffs School	Glenreagh	Clarence Valley	Christian
St Andrew's Christian School	Grafton	Clarence Valley	Christian
St Columba Anglican School	Port Macquarie	Port Macquarie	Anglican
Summerland Christian College	Goonellabah	Lismore	Ind. Christian
Tallowood Steiner School	Bowraville	Nambucca	Steiner
Taree Christian College	Taree	Greater Taree	Baptist
The Small School	Murwillumbah	Tweed	Independent
Tuntable Falls Community School	Tuntable Falls	Lismore	Independent
Tweed Valley Adventist College	Murwillumbah	Tweed	Adventist
Vistara Primary School	Richmond Hill	Lismore	Ananda Marga

=== Defunct private schools ===
Name	Suburb	LGA	Category	Opened	Closed
Holy Spirit College	Grafton	Clarence Valley	Catholic	?	1989
Little Flower School	Tumbulgum	Tweed	Catholic primary	1921	1969
Manning River Steiner School	Taree	Greater Taree	Steiner	1977	2012
Our Lady of Lourdes Infants School	East Lismore	Lismore	Catholic	1959	2015
Sisters of Mercy College	Casino	Richmond Valley	Catholic girls	1887	1977
St Aloysius College	Grafton	Clarence Valley	Catholic boys	1965	1989
St Brigid's Primary School	Burringbar	Tweed	Catholic primary	1921	1969
St Joseph's High School	Lismore	Lismore	Catholic boys	1911	1984
St Mary's College	Grafton	Clarence Valley	Catholic girls	1885	1987
St Mary's College	Lismore	Lismore	Catholic girls	1886	1984
St Michael's Infants School	Casino	Richmond Valley	Catholic primary	1960	2000
St Paul's College	Kempsey	Kempsey	Catholic boys	1965	1979
St Paul's High School	Port Macquarie	Port Macquarie	Catholic	1995	2014
St Pius X Regional High School	Kempsey	Kempsey	Catholic girls	1973	1979
Uki Convent School	Uki	Tweed	Catholic primary	1923	1967

== See also ==
- List of schools in Australia
- List of schools in New South Wales
- List of schools in Gold Coast, Queensland
