= Old Casino railway station =

Former railway station in New South Wales, Australia

Old Casino

General information
- Location: Dyraaba Street, Casino
- System: Former railway station ←Casino · Lismore→
- Owner: Transport Asset Manager of New South Wales
- Operator: NSW TrainLink
- Line: Murwillumbah
- Platforms: 1
- Tracks: 1

Construction
- Structure type: Ground

Other information
- Status: Preserved
- Website: https://mgnsw.org.au/organisations/old-casino-station-museum/

History
- Opened: 1903
- Closed: 1974
- Former names: Casino railway station
Route map
Location

Old Casino railway station
- Location within New South Wales
- 28.8553°S 153.0502°E
- Location: Murwillumbah railway line, Casino, Richmond Valley Council, New South Wales, Australia

History
- Built: 1903–

Site notes
- Owner: Transport Asset Holding Entity

New South Wales Heritage Register
- Official name: Old Casino Railway Station
- Type: state heritage (complex / group)
- Designated: 2 April 1999
- Reference no.: 1216
- Type: Railway Platform/Station
- Category: Transport – Rail

Old Casino railway station is a heritage-listed former railway station and now museum on the Murwillumbah railway line at Casino, Richmond Valley Council, New South Wales, Australia. It was built from 1903. The property was added to the New South Wales State Heritage Register on 2 April 1999.

It serves as the entry point for section 2 of the Northern Rivers Rail Trail which stretches 13.4 km from Casino to Bentley.

== History ==
The station opened as Casino railway station on 19 October 1903 with the extension of the Murwillumbah railway line to Casino.

When the North Coast railway line was extended from Kyogle to the Queensland border and then to Brisbane, it did not pass through the existing Casino station, so it was necessary to build a new Casino railway station on the new line. The original railway station was renamed Old Casino in 1930 when the new Casino station opened. The old station remained in operation as a branch line railway station until being closed c. 1974.

It was abandoned for many years, but has since been restored and now houses the Old Casino Station Museum.

The station platform was removed c. 1990. A rare example of a tripod crane survived for many years, but was destroyed in a storm in 2012.

== Description ==
The timber station building is of a type 16 pioneer design and was completed in 1903.

== Heritage listing ==
The Old Casino site is significant as the first railway station in the area opening in 1903 and changing to Old Casino with the opening of the new facilities when the main line was opened to Brisbane in 1930. It is a good example of a pioneer building at a large location. The crane is a rare and preserved example of this type of early timber and steel structure.

Old Casino railway station was listed on the New South Wales State Heritage Register on 2 April 1999 having satisfied the following criteria.

The place possesses uncommon, rare or endangered aspects of the cultural or natural history of New South Wales.

This item is assessed as historically rare. This item is assessed as arch. rare. This item is assessed as socially rare.

== See also ==
- List of disused regional railway stations in New South Wales
