= Cobaki =

Cobaki may refer to:

- Cobaki, New South Wales, town in Tweed Shire, NSW, Australia
- Cobaki, Afghanistan, location mentioned in connection with America's Response Monument INew York City
