= North Arm (disambiguation) =

North Arm is a settlement on East Falkland.

North Arm may also refer to:

- North Arm, New South Wales
- North Arm, Queensland, a town and locality in Australia
- North Arm and North Arm Creek, in Barker Inlet, South Australia
- North Arm Bridge, an extradosed bridge in Vancouver, British Columbia, Canada
- North Arm Cove, New South Wales

== See also ==
- North Bentinck Arm
- North West Arm
- Northern Arm
