= South Grafton High School =

Location
- Tyson Street, South Grafton, Mid North Coast region of New South Wales; Australia; 29°42′58″S 152°55′52″E

Information
- Type: Government-funded co-educational comprehensive secondary day school
- Motto: Latin: Sursum Spectantes (Looking upwards)
- Established: 1964
- School district: Grafton
- Educational authority: NSW Department of Education
- Principal: Daniel Moar
- Teaching staff: 65.1 FTE (2023)
- Years: 7–12
- Enrolment: 712 (2023)
- Campus type: Regional
- Colours: Green, yellow, red
- Slogan: Excellence and Innovation
- Website: sthgrafton-h.schools.nsw.gov.au

South Grafton High School (abbreviated as SGHS) is a government-funded co-educational comprehensive secondary day school, located in South Grafton, in the Mid North Coast region of New South Wales, Australia.

In 2023, the school enrolled approximately 712 students from Year 7 to Year 12, of whom 47 percent identified as Indigenous Australians and three percent were from a language background other than English. The school is operated by the NSW Department of Education.

== See also ==
- List of government schools in New South Wales
- List of schools in the Northern Rivers and Mid North Coast
- Education in Australia
- Grafton High School
