= Cobaki Lakes, New South Wales =

Town in New South Wales, Australia

Cobaki Lakes
- Suburb
- Coordinates: 28°11′4″S 153°28′11″E
- Country: Australia
- State: New South Wales
- LGA: Tweed Shire
- Location: 24 km (15 mi) SE of Surfers Paradise; 10 km (6.2 mi) W of Tweed Heads; 101 km (63 mi) SSE of Brisbane; 820 km (510 mi) N of Sydney

Government
  - State electorate: Tweed
  - Federal division: Richmond
- Elevation: 5 m (16 ft)

Population
  - Total: 42 (2016 census)
- Postcode: 2486
Suburbs around Cobaki Lakes
Currumbin Waters (QLD)	Tugun (QLD)	Bilinga (QLD)
Currumbin Waters (QLD)	Cobaki Lakes	Tweed Heads West
Piggabeen	Cobaki	Tweed Heads West

Cobaki Lakes is a suburb of Tweed Heads, located in the Northern Rivers Region of New South Wales, along the Queensland and New South Wales border.

== History ==
Cobaki Lakes is situated in the Bundjalung traditional Aboriginal country.

Cobaki Lakes was approved in May 2011 by the New South Wales Northern Joint Regional Planning Panel, appointed by the NSW Government and Tweed Shire.
