= Macleay River railway bridge, Kempsey =

Macleay River Railway Bridge
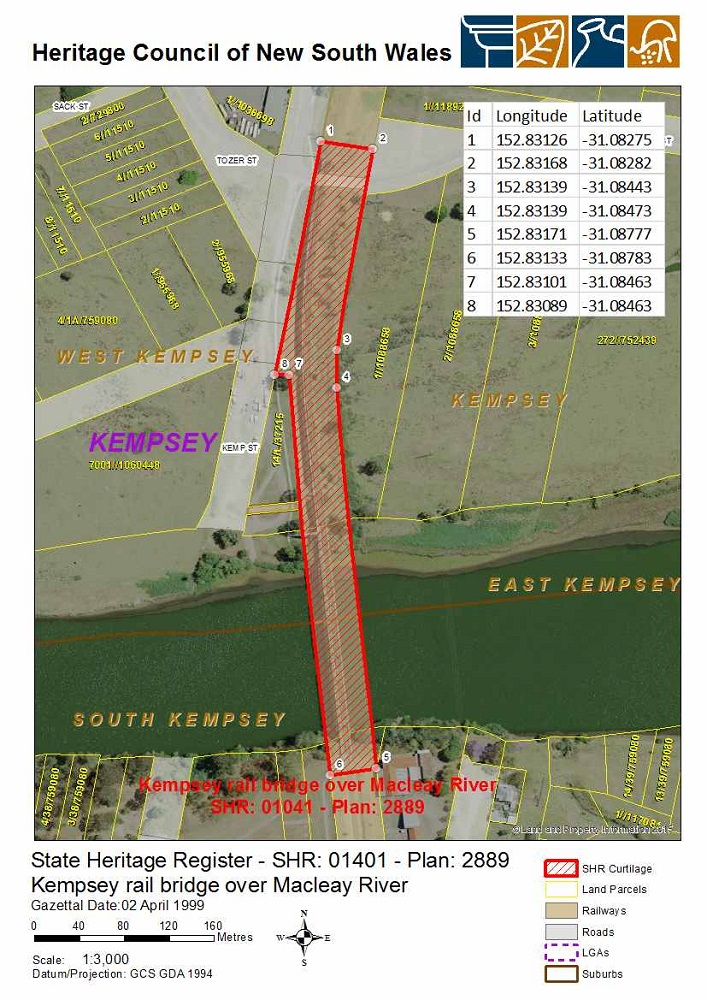
- Heritage boundaries
- Coordinates: 31°05′12″S 152°49′53″E
- Carries: North Coast railway line
- Crosses: Macleay River
- Locale: Kempsey, New South Wales, Australia
- Begins: Kempsey
- Ends: South Kempsey
- Owner: Transport Asset Manager of New South Wales
- Maintained by: Australian Rail Track Corporation

Characteristics
- Design: Truss bridge
- Material: Steel
- Pier construction: Steel & concrete
- No. of spans: 3

Rail characteristics
- No. of tracks: 1

History
- Fabrication by: Walsh Island Dockyard & Engineering Works
- Opened: 3 December 1917

New South Wales Heritage Register
- Official name: Kempsey rail bridge over Macleay River
- Type: State heritage (built)
- Designated: 2 April 1999
- Reference no.: 1041
- Type: Railway Bridge/Viaduct
- Category: Transport – Rail

Location
- Interactive map of Macleay River Railway Bridge

The Macleay River Railway Bridge is a heritage-listed railway bridge that carries the North Coast railway line across the Macleay River from Kempsey to South Kempsey in New South Wales, Australia.

== History ==
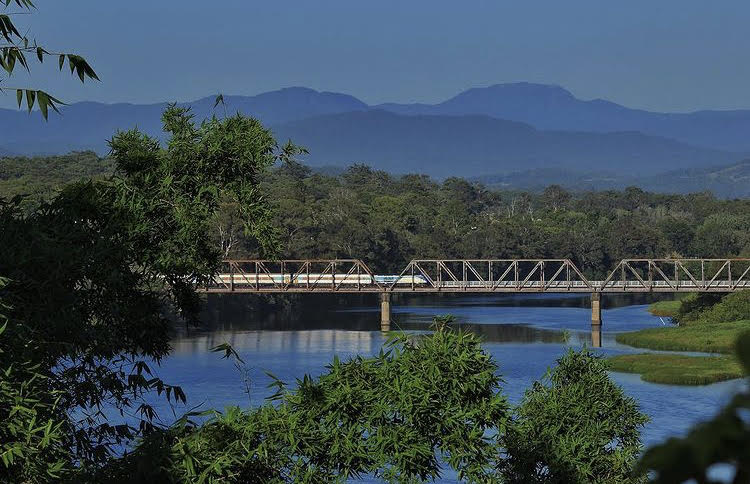
Southbound XPT crossing the Macleay River Railway Bridge with Mount Banda Banda to the upper right

The Macleay River Railway Bridge opened on 3 December 1917 with the extension of the North Coast railway line from Wauchope to Kempsey. The steelwork was made at the Walsh Island Dockyard & Engineering Works, Newcastle and transported to Kempsey by sea.

The bridge was damaged in floods in 1949 and 1950. It was repaired with the timber trestles replaced by 1880s vintage wrought iron Warren trusses formerly used on the Main Western railway line between Parramatta and Penrith. It was proposed to replace the entire bridge, but this proposal had been abandoned by 1953.

In 1966 the bridge spans were raised by one metre (three feet) due to the 1950s floods, with new pre-cast concrete approaches constructed.

== Description ==
The bridge is a steel Pratt truss bridge with consisting of three 61-metre (200 ft) steel spans and two 20-metre (66 ft) plate girder spans. It was built with steel approaches, with the pre-cast concrete approaches added later when the bridge was raised.

When opened in 1917, the crossing of the river was achieved by three 61-metre (200 ft) steel truss spans, approached by timber trestles. After two floods in 1949 and in 1950, the steel trusses were raised approximately one metre (three feet) and the approaches replaced by pre-stressed concrete spans. It was listed on the New South Wales State Heritage Register on 2 April 1999.
