= Piggabeen =

Town in New South Wales, Australia

- Town
- Coordinates: 28°11′S 153°28′E
- Country: Australia
- State: New South Wales
- LGA: Tweed Shire
- Location: 109 km (68 mi) SSE of Brisbane; 60 km (37 mi) S of Surfers Paradise; 31 km (19 mi) W of Tweed Heads; 830 km (520 mi) N of Sydney

Government
  - State electorate: Tweed
  - Federal division: Richmond
- Elevation: 35 m (115 ft)

Population
  - Total: 327 (2011 census)
- Time zone: UTC+10 (AEST)
  - Summer (DST): UTC+11 (AEDT)
- Postcode: 2486
Localities around Piggabeen
Elanora	Currumbin Waters	Cobaki Lakes
Currumbin Valley	Piggabeen	Cobaki
Carool	Carool	Bilambil

Piggabeen is a town in north-eastern New South Wales, Australia, in the Tweed Shire.

The Ngandowal and Minyungbal speaking people of the Bundjalung people are the traditional owners of the Tweed region, including Piggabeen, and the surrounding areas.

== Background ==
Piggabeen adjoins Cobaki Lakes that is situated 1.2 kilometres (0.75 mi) to the northeast, Cobaki to the South East and Currumbin Valley that is situated approximately 2 kilometres (1.2 mi) to the northwest and across the state border of Queensland.

Once predominantly a dairy farming town Piggabeen now mainly consists of acreage homesites and small hobby farms. Piggabeen has a valley that leads northwest towards the Queensland border. Piggabeen and its valley are part of the Tweed Shield Volcano and Caldera that is the largest erosion caldera in the southern hemisphere, with Mount Warning being the extinct volcano. Landmarks located in Piggabeen include the Old Piggabeen Hall and School that were both established in 1919, Piggabeen Creek, as well as Campbell Hill, (formerly Mount Campbell).

The Aboriginal meaning for Piggabeen (Valley of the Palms) is Bundjulung Piccabeen or bigibin for the Bangalow palms.

== Demographics ==
In the 2011 census, Piggabeen recorded a population of 327 people, 46.8% female and 53.2% male.

The median age of the Piggabeen population was 42 years, 5 years above the national median of 37.

78.9% of people living in Piggabeen were born in Australia. The other top responses for country of birth were England 6.4%, New Zealand 5.5%, United States of America 0.9%.

93% of people spoke only English at home; the next most common language was 0.9% Maltese.
