= Great Lakes College =

Location
- Forster/Tuncurry, Mid North Coast, New South Wales; Australia; 32°12′55″S 152°31′39″E

Information
- Type: Government-funded co-educational comprehensive secondary day school
- Motto: Tis the Game not the Prize
- Established: 1978; 48 years ago (as Forster High School); 2003; 23 years ago (as Great Lakes College)
- School district: Great Lakes; Regional North
- Educational authority: NSW Department of Education
- College Principal: Graeme Jennings
- Campus principals: Jennifer Miggins (Forster); Sally Chad (Tuncurry Junior); Davina Bowen (Tuncurry Senior)
- Teaching staff: 134.4 FTE (2018)
- Years: 7–12
- Enrolment: 1,556 (2018)
- Campuses: Cape Hawke Drive, Forster (Forster Junior Campus); The Northern Parkway, Tuncurry (Tuncurry Junior Campus and Senior Campus)
- Colours: Blue, red and white
- Website: greatlakes-c.schools.nsw.gov.au

Great Lakes College is a multi-campus government-funded co-educational comprehensive secondary day school, located in the dual-town of Forster/Tuncurry, in the Mid North Coast region of New South Wales, Australia.

Established initially in 1978 as Forster High School, in 2003 through division of Forster High School, the Great Lakes College was formed. The combined campuses enrolled approximately 1,410 students in 2022, from Year 7 to Year 12. As of 2022 the Senior Campus, a senior school located in Tuncurry that caters for students in Year 11 and Year 12 only, enrolled 344 students, of whom 9% identified as Indigenous Australians and 3% were from a language background other than English; and of the two junior high schools catering for Year 7 to Year 10, the one located on the same site in Tuncurry enrolled 505 students (13% indigenous, 4% non-English language background) and the one located in Forster enrolled 565 students (18% indigenous, 4% non-English language background).

The school is operated by the NSW Department of Education; and prepares students for the NSW Higher School Certificate and post school destinations. The College Principal is Graeme Jennings.

== Notable alumni ==
- Paul Carroll – international volleyball player
- Jamal Idris – former professional rugby league footballer
- Holly Rankin – singer-songwriter performing as Jack River (musician)
- Ellie Johnston – Professional sports person, NRL Women's Premiership Represented Australia

== See also ==
- List of government schools in New South Wales
- List of schools in the Northern Rivers and Mid North Coast
- Education in Australia
