= Orara High School =

Location
- Coffs Harbour, Mid North Coast, New South Wales; Australia; 30°16′56″S 153°6′45″E

Information
- Type: Government-funded co-educational comprehensive secondary day school
- Motto: Safe, Respectful, Inclusive
- Established: 1970; 56 years ago
- School district: Coffs Harbour; Regional North
- Educational authority: NSW Department of Education
- Principal: Laura McRae
- Teaching staff: 54.6 FTE (2018)
- Years: 7–12
- Enrolment: 593 (2018)
- Campus: Regional
- Colours: Green and white
- Website: orara-h.schools.nsw.gov.au

Orara High School is a government-funded co-educational comprehensive secondary day school, located in Coffs Harbour, in the Mid North Coast region of New South Wales, Australia.

Established in 1970, the school enrolled approximately 590 students in 2018, from Year 7 to Year 12, of whom 19 percent identified as Indigenous Australians and 15 percent were from a language background other than English. The school is operated by the NSW Department of Education; the principal is Laura McRae

== Overview ==
On 12 November 1969 approval was given for a new high school to be built on Joyce Street. In August 1970 positions at the new school were advertised. In 1972 Orara High opened at its present Joyce Street site. Current student enrolment is more than 780.

Orara High School is a comprehensive school that is known for the wide variety of cultural activities that its students are involved with. Every year Orara High School celebrates its diversity by participating in NAIDOC day celebrations, Harmony Day, Creative and Performing Arts evenings and other related activities.

== Notable incidents ==
=== 1991 Shooting ===
On 19 June 1991, a student entered the grounds of Orara High School and fired several shots. Three persons were injured, including 2 members of staff and 1 student. The gunman was apprehended by a number of students who managed to tackle him to the ground, successfully ending the ordeal. The incident marked the first recorded instance of a shooting within an Australian high school.

== Controversy ==
On 29 November 2013, the then Deputy Principal of Orara High School, Andrew Minisini, was charged with two counts of recruiting a child to engage in criminal activity, one count of malicious damage and one count of supplying a minor with alcohol. Minisini is alleged to have supplied and consumed alcohol with three female students who he had befriended, aged 16 and 17, before committing acts of vandalism against the home of the then school principal, Frank Stanton in Valla Beach. It is understood that Minisini was embroiled in a personal matter with Mr. Stanton at this time and is alleged to have recruited the girls to commit the malicious acts on his behalf. Minisini denied all accusations, appearing before the Coffs Harbour District Court in April 2014.

== Notable alumni ==
- Deborah Knight – television and news presenter and journalist
- Ben Newton – Australian wheelchair rugby player; represented Australia at the London Paralympics
- Melinda Pavey – Former politician, formerly a Member for Oxley, formerly a Member of the NSW Legislative Council

== See also ==
- List of government schools in New South Wales: G–P
- List of schools in the Northern Rivers and Mid North Coast
- Education in Australia
