= Cobaki, New South Wales =

Town in New South Wales, Australia

Coordinates: 28.133411°S 153.484840°E

Cobaki
- Town
- Country: Australia
- State: New South Wales
- LGA: Tweed Shire
- Location: 57 km (35 mi) SE of Surfers Paradise; 28 km (17 mi) W of Tweed Heads; 127 km (79 mi) SSE of Brisbane; 827 km (514 mi) N of Sydney

Government
  - State electorate: Tweed
  - Federal division: Richmond
- Elevation: 9 m (30 ft)

Population
  - Total: 225 (2011 census)
- Time zone: UTC+10 (AEST)
  - Summer (DST): UTC+11 (AEDT)
- Postcode: 2486
Localities around Cobaki
Currumbin Waters	Cobaki Lakes	Bilinga
Piggabeen	Cobaki	Tweed Heads West
Carool	Bilambil	Bilambil Heights

Cobaki (/koʊbəkaɪ/ KOH-bə-ky) is a town in north-eastern New South Wales, Australia, in the Tweed Shire.

The Ngandowal and Minyungbal speaking people of the Bundjalung people are the traditional owners of the Tweed region, including Cobaki, and the surrounding areas.

== Origin on place name ==
The name Cobaki is taken from the Yugambeh–Bundjalung languages although its exact derivation is unclear. It is thought to either be taken from the Budjalung word cobriki, meaning 'bush timber', or from the Githabul dialect words gabuga (corn or maize) or gubagan (blue-tongued lizard).

== Demographics ==
In the 2011 census, Cobaki recorded a population of 225 people, 48.4% female and 51.6% male.

The median age of the Cobaki population was 38 years, 1 year above the national median of 37.

89% of people living in Cobaki were born in Australia. The other top responses for country of birth were New Zealand 2.6%, China 2.2%, Scotland 1.3%, England 1.3%.

96.5% of people spoke only English at home; the next most common languages were 1.8% French, 1.8% Mandarin,
