= Northern Rivers Rail Trail =

Trail in New South Wales, Australia

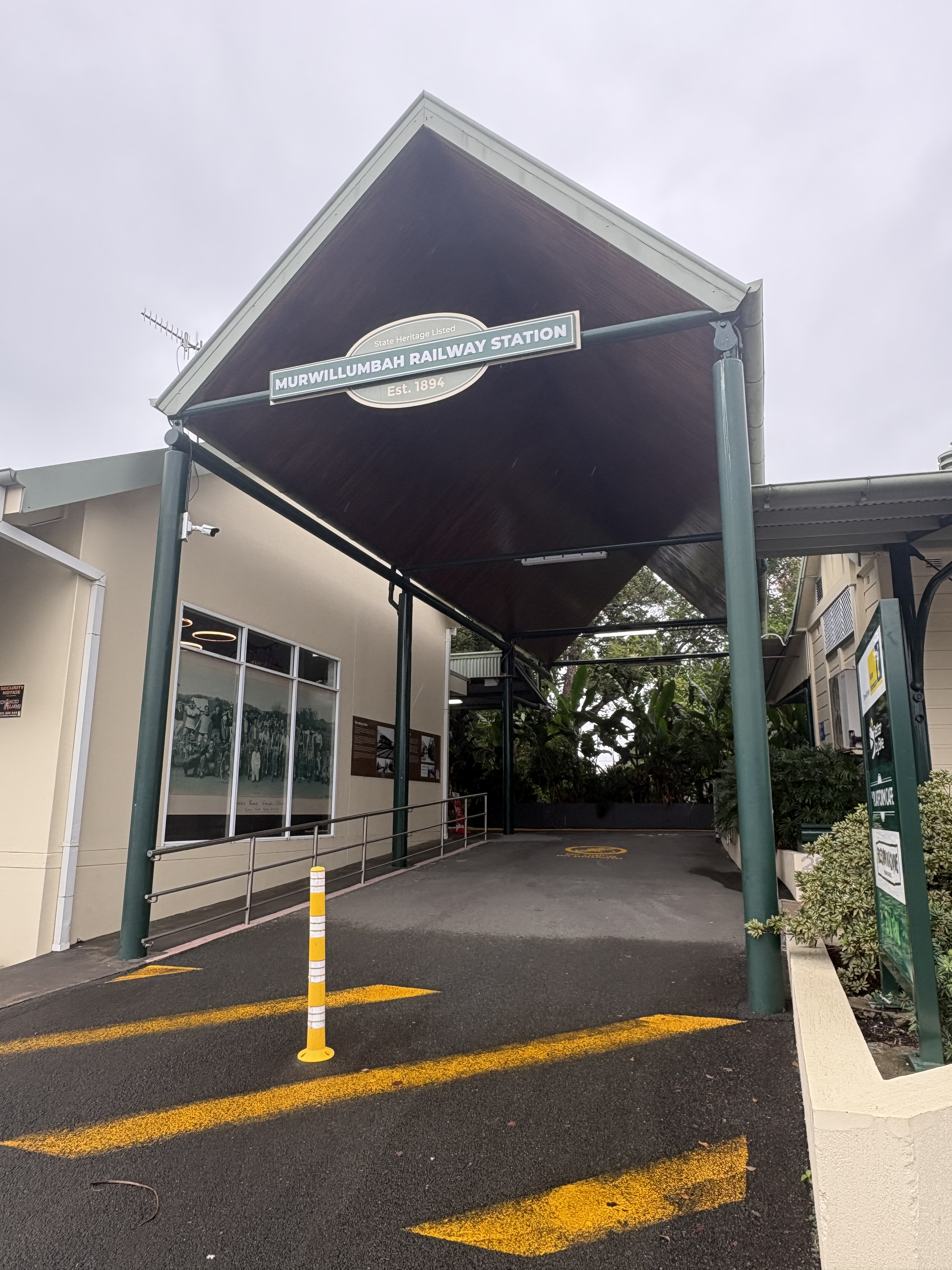
The start of the Northern Rivers Rail Trail at Murwillumbah railway station, 2026

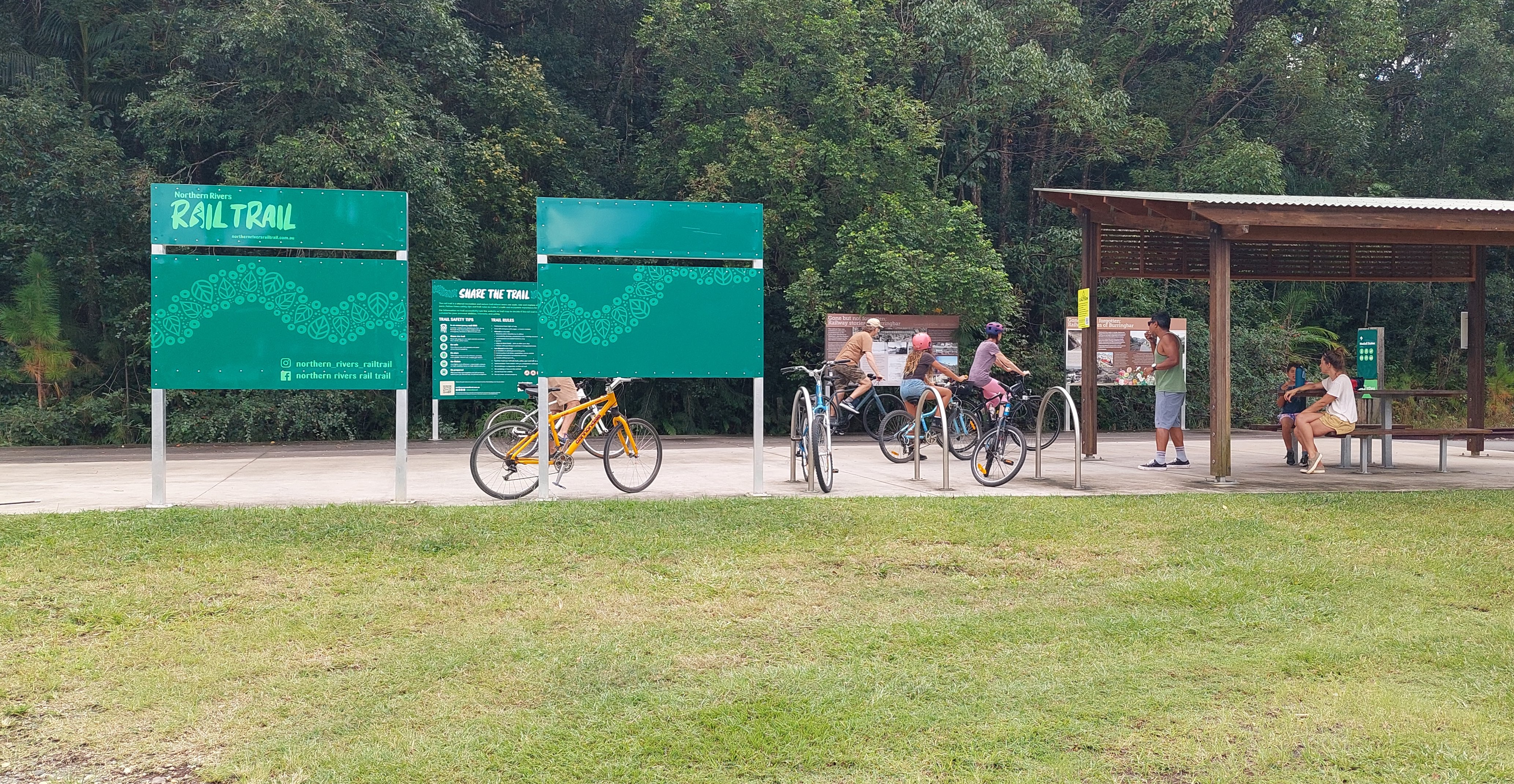
Burringbar, NSW Northern Rivers Rail Trail stop, 2025

The Northern Rivers Rail Trail is a multi-use rail trail in Northern Rivers region of New South Wales, which is a walking and cycling trail, with horses permitted on certain small sections. Completed sections runs through the Tweed and Richmond Valley local government areas, and as of June 2024, is undergoing further extension into areas of Byron Shire and Lismore. When completed, the trail will be 132 km long.

It follows the Murwillumbah railway line, which ceased train services in May 2004.

== Track details ==
=== Section 1: Murwillumbah to Crabbes Creek ===
This 23km section opened in 2023, passing through the following towns and villages in the Tweed Shire:

- Murwillumbah; where it starts at and incorporates the heritage listed Murwillumbah railway station.
- Dunbible
- Stokers Siding
- Burringbar
- Mooball
- Crabbes Creek

This section uses 18 railway bridges and passes through 2 railway tunnels; these are the Burringbar Range Tunnel and the Hulls Road Tunnel. These tunnels are a habitat for microbat and glowworms and are kept dark so as not to disturb them; visitors are asked to bring torches and dismount when passing through them.

Views of Mount Warning (Wollumbin) can be seen along long stretches of this track.

=== Section 2: Casino to Bentley ===
This 13.4km section opened in March 2024, connecting the following towns in the Richmond Valley Council area:

- Casino; where it starts at the Old Casino railway station.
- Bentley; where it ends at the historic Bentley Bridge.

=== Section 3: Bentley to Booyong ===
The section from Bentley to Lismore (16.3km) opened in December 2024.

A further 20.9km section from Lismore to Booyong, is at the planning and approval stage.

=== Section 4: Booyong to Crabbes Creek ===
Sections in the Byron Shire will complete the trail. Multiple sections have been approved in principle and are awaiting funding. Other sections, particularly between Byron Bay town to Mullumbimby have proven to be politically contentious. Part of the formation is in use by the Byron Bay Train.

In February 2026, Byron Council voted to complete the rail trail, and dropped their policy to consider the return of rail services on the line.
