= Tweed Valley Adventist College =

Location
- 9 hall drive Murwillumbah, New South Wales; Murwillumbah; NSW; Australia

Information
- Type: Independent co-educational primary and secondary day school
- Religious affiliation: Australian Union Conference of Seventh-day Adventists
- Denomination: Seventh-day Adventist
- Established: 1958; 68 years ago
- Principal: Michele Wilson
- Employees: 52 (2025)
- Years: K–12
- Enrolment: 381 (2025)
- Houses: Baits, Andrews and Haskel.
- Colours: Navy, black, blue and white
- Slogan: Nurture for today, Learning for tomorrow, Character for eternity
- Website: www.tvac.nsw.edu.au

The Tweed Valley Adventist College is an independent Seventh-day Adventist co-educational primary and secondary school, located in the Northern Rivers town of Murwillumbah, New South Wales, Australia. Established in 1958, the College offers education from Pre-Kindy to Year 12 and is owned by Seventh-day Adventist Schools (NNSW) Ltd.

According to the Australian Curriculum, Assessment and Reporting Authority, Tweed Valley Adventist College had an enrolment of 381 students and employed 34 teaching staff and 18 non-teaching staff as of 2025. In 2022, the school was one of the top performing in NAPLAN within the region.

== See also ==
- List of schools in Northern Rivers and Mid North Coast
- List of Seventh-day Adventist secondary schools
- Seventh-day Adventist education
