= Campbell Hill (New South Wales) =

Mountain in New South Wales, Australia

- Location within New South Wales

Highest point
- Elevation: 123 m (404 ft)
- Coordinates: 28°12′S 153°27′E

Geography
- Location: Tweed Shire, New South Wales, Australia

Campbell Hill (formerly Mount Campbell) is a mountain located in Piggabeen, New South Wales, Australia. It is located in the region of the Tweed Shire in the state of New South Wales, in the eastern part of the country, 900 kilometres (560 mi) north of the capital, Canberra, approximately 107 kilometres (66 mi) from Brisbane and 24 kilometres (15 mi) from Surfers Paradise. Campbell Hill is approximately 123 metres (404 ft) above sea level. Piggabeen is situated in the hinterland approximately 5 km behind the Gold Coast Highway and the Gold Coast Airport. Piggabeen and its valley adjoins Currumbin Valley in Queensland.

The terrain around Campbell Hill is flat to hilly and the mount faces to the northeast. From the top of Campbell Hill you can capture views of the Pacific Ocean, Surfers Paradise, the Gold Coast Airport, the township of Coolangatta that are all within Queensland and also Fingal Head in New South Wales. Campbell Hill is situated approximately 6 kilometres (3.7 mi) directly inland from Bilinga on the Gold Coast.

The nearest society, Tweed Heads, is 7.4 km east of Campbell Hill. Campbell Hill is approximately 10 minutes' drive from Coolangatta and Tweed Heads. Gold Coast swimming and surfing beaches such as Kirra, Greenmount, and Rainbow Bay are also close by.

The area around Campbell Hill consists mainly large acreage homesites. Campbell Hill is located approximately 1.2 km from the southern entrance of the recently approved (May 2011) Cobaki Lakes development. This is a large scale residential development that will eventually hold up 5,500 dwellings, and up to 12,000 people.

== Climate ==
The climate in the area is temperate. The average annual temperature in the area is approximately 20 °C. The warmest month is January, when the average temperature is 24 °C and the coldest is July, with 14 °C. The average annual rainfall is 1876 mm. The wettest month is January, with an average of 327 mm rainfall, and the driest is October, with 40 mm of rainfall.
