= Kingscliff High School =

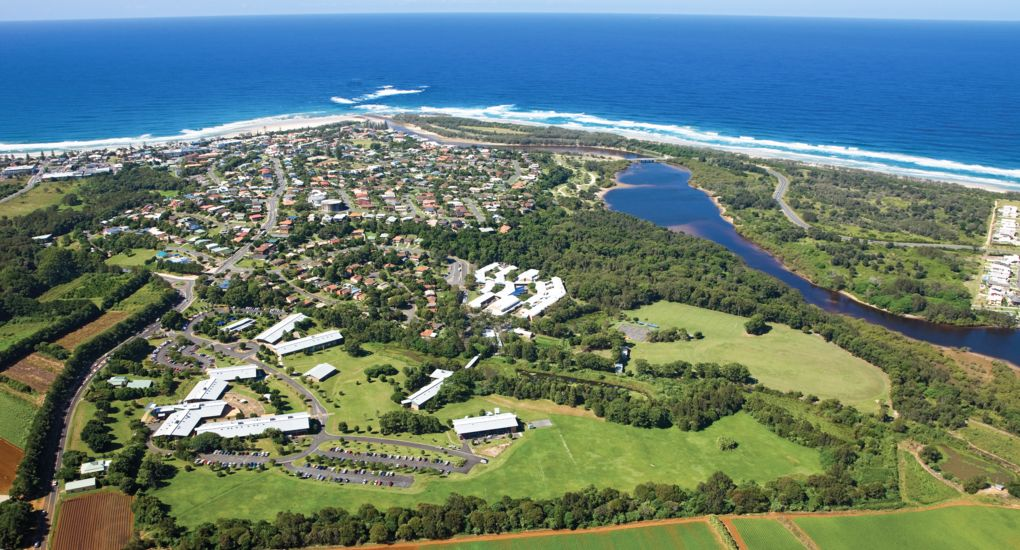

Location
- Kingscliff, Northern Rivers, New South Wales; Australia; 28°15′57″S 153°34′22″E

Information
- Type: Government-funded co-educational comprehensive secondary day school
- Motto: Achievement through Endeavour
- Established: 1986; 40 years ago
- School district: Tweed Coast; Regional North
- Educational authority: NSW Department of Education
- Principal: Michael Hensley
- Teaching staff: 73.8 FTE (2018)
- Years: 7–12
- Enrolment: 1,001 (2018)
- Campus type: Regional
- Website: kingscliff-h.schools.nsw.gov.au

Kingscliff High School, sometimes referred to as Kingy High is a government-funded co-educational comprehensive secondary day school, located in Kingscliff, in the Northern Rivers region of New South Wales, Australia.

Established in 1986, the school enrolled approximately 1,000 students in 2018, from Year 7 to Year 12, of whom 12 percent identified as Indigenous Australians and eight percent were from a language background other than English. The school is operated by the NSW Department of Education; the principal is Michael Hensley.

The school has close ties with the adjoining Kingscliff Institute of TAFE.

== See also ==
- List of government schools in New South Wales: G–P
- List of schools in the Northern Rivers and Mid North Coast
- Education in Australia
