= Woolgoolga High School =

School in New South Wales, Australia

Location
- Woolgoolga, Mid North Coast, New South Wales; Australia; 30°06′02″S 153°11′24″E

Information
- Type: Government-funded co-educational comprehensive secondary day school
- Motto: success crowns effort
- Established: 1981; 45 years ago (as Woolgoolga Central School)
- School district: Grafton; Regional North
- Educational authority: NSW Department of Education
- Principal: Lu Nickell
- Teaching staff: 63.7 FTE (2020)
- Years: 7–12
- Enrolment: 812 (2018)
- Campus type: Regional
- Colours: Sky blue, navy blue, grey and white
- Website: woolgoolga-h.schools.nsw.gov.au

Woolgoolga High School is a government-funded co-educational comprehensive secondary day school, located in Woolgoolga, in the Mid North Coast region of New South Wales, Australia.

Established in 1981 as Woolgoolga Central School, Woolgoolga High School enrolled approximately 810 students in 2020, from Year 7 to Year 12, of whom fourteen percent identified as Indigenous Australians and thirteen percent were from a language background other than English. The school is operated by the NSW Department of Education; the principal is Lu Nickell.

== Overview ==
Elective subjects are offered to students in Years 8 to 12. Also offered are a wide variety of extension courses.

Woolgoolga High School is located 2 kilometres (1 mi) north of the township of Woolgoolga. While the school does not have its own sporting facilities, it is over the road from the Wiigulga Sports complex and is within two hundred metres of Woolgoolga Sports Ground and Tennis Courts. The agricultural facilities are located off campus within the township of Woolgoolga.

== Notable alumni ==
- Cadel Evans – cyclist; first Australian to win the Tour de France
- Harley Ingleby – surfer; world champion longboard rider
- Emma Moffatt – triathlete; World Triathlon Champion and Australian Olympic Bronze Medallist
- Jessica Gentle – rugby league player

== See also ==
- List of government schools in New South Wales: Q–Z
- List of schools in the Northern Rivers and Mid North Coast
- Education in Australia
