= Grafton High School (New South Wales) =

Location
- Mary Street, Grafton, Northern Rivers, New South Wales; Australia
- Coordinates: 29°40′58″S 152°55′59″E

Information
- Type: Government-funded co-educational dual modality partially academically selective and comprehensive secondary day school
- Motto: Latin: Enitere ad finem (Strive to the end)
- Established: 1912; 114 years ago
- School district: Rural North
- Educational authority: NSW Department of Education
- Principal: Scott Dinham
- Teaching staff: 72.2 FTE (2018)
- Years: 7–12
- Enrolment: 905 (2018)
- Campus type: Regional
- Colours: Navy and white
- Website: grafton-h.schools.nsw.gov.au

Grafton High School (abbreviated as GHS) is government-funded co-educational dual modality partially academically selective and comprehensive secondary day school, located in Grafton, in the Northern Rivers region of New South Wales, Australia.

Established in 1912, the school enrolled approximately 900 students in 2018, from Year 7 to Year 12, of whom 15 percent identified as Indigenous Australians and four percent were from a language background other than English. The school is operated by the NSW Department of Education; the principal is Scott Dinham.

== History ==
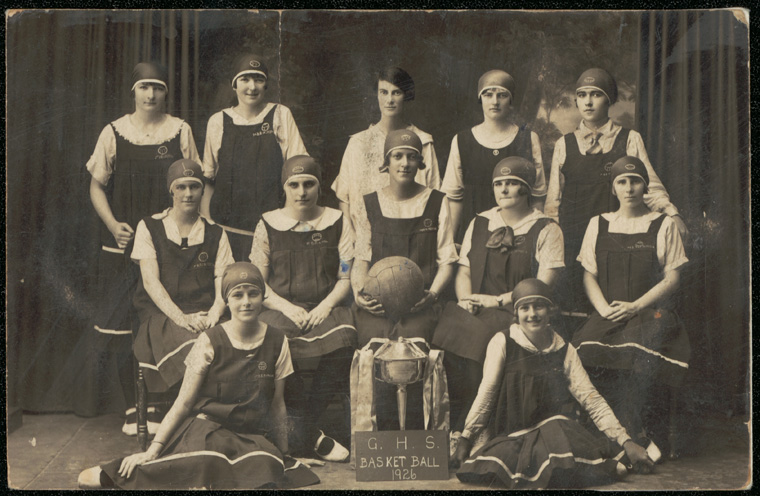
Grafton High basketball team, pictured in 1926

Grafton High School was established on 1 January 1912 and opened on 1 July of that year as a formal education system was being established in New South Wales. A new building opened on 17 May 1915.

Since at least the 1960s, but according to an attached note since 1915, the school has been home to the head of an Egyptian mummy.

== See also ==
- List of government schools in New South Wales: G–P
- List of selective high schools in New South Wales
- List of schools in the Northern Rivers and Mid North Coast
- Education in Australia
