= South Grafton, New South Wales =

South Grafton
- Suburb
- Interactive map of South Grafton
- Coordinates: 29.7069654°S 152.9413444°E
- Country: Australia
- State: New South Wales
- City: Grafton
- LGA: Clarence Valley Council
- Location: 616 km (383 mi) N of Sydney; 319 km (198 mi) S of Brisbane; 4 km (2.5 mi) S of Grafton; 78 km (48 mi) NW of Coffs Harbour

Government
  - State electorate: Clarence
  - Federal division: Page
- Elevation: 6 m (20 ft)

Population
  - Total: 6,288 (2021 census)
- Postcode: 2460
- County: Clarence County

South Grafton is a suburb of Grafton, New South Wales, taking in most of the area of the city south of the Clarence River. At the time of the 2021 Australian census, South Grafton had a population of 6288 people, about one-third of Grafton's total population.

== History ==
South Grafton was first settled around the same time as the main Grafton townsite. However, it was not until the opening of the Grafton Bridge in 1932 that a direct road connection was established between the two settlements – previously residents had relied upon a ferry service to cross the Clarence River. In 1896, South Grafton was given its own municipal government under the Municipalities Act 1867. It was known as the South Grafton Municipal District until 1906 and thereafter as the South Grafton Municipality. In 1956, the South Grafton Municipality was merged into the Grafton City Council. This was in turn merged with other local government areas in 2004 to form the current Clarence Valley Council.

== Facilities ==
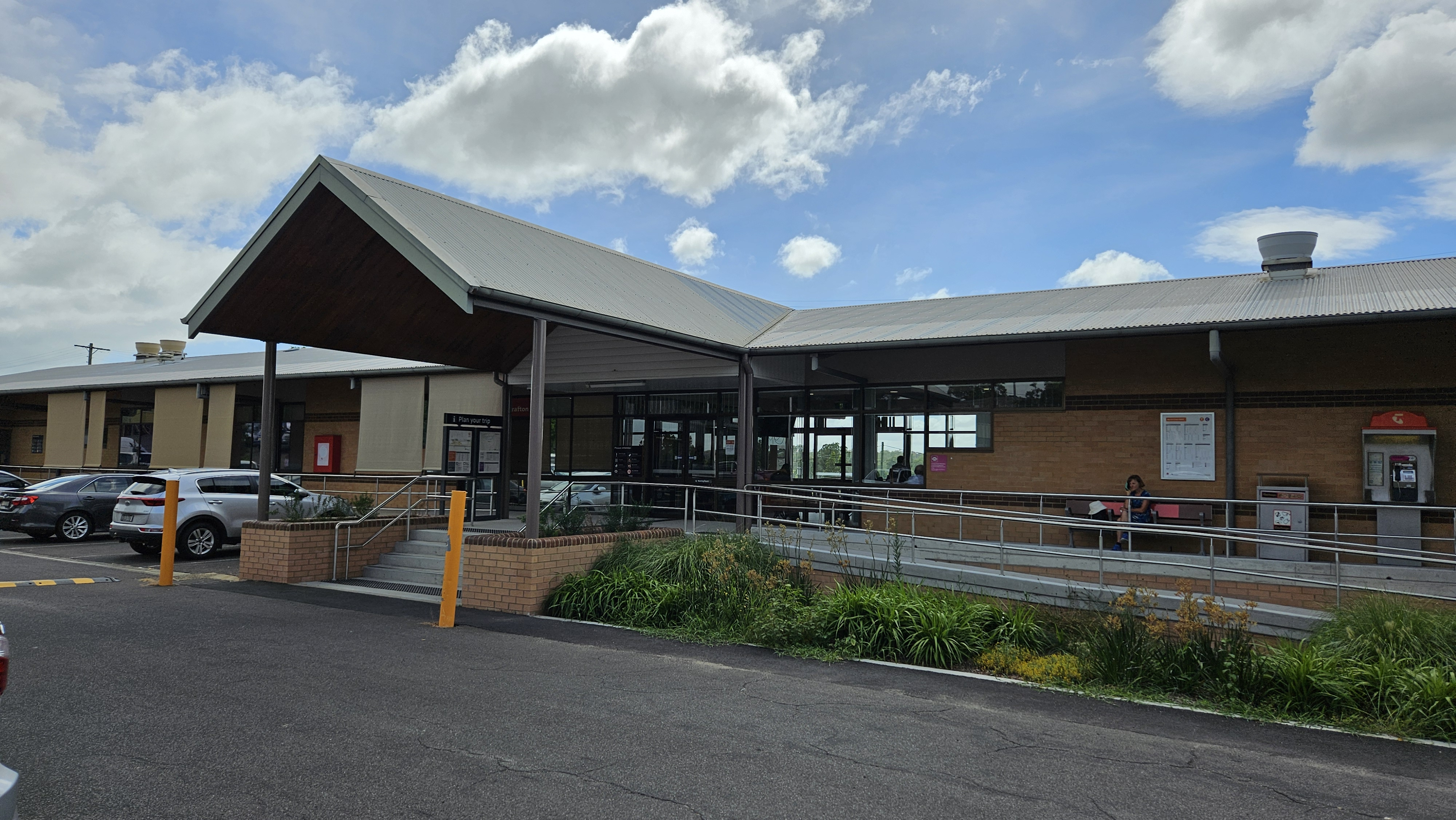
Railway station forecourt

The Grafton railway station is located in South Grafton. It was known as the South Grafton station until 1976, when the old Grafton station north of the river closed.

South Grafton has two schools: South Grafton High School and the primary school South Grafton Public School.

== Heritage listings ==
South Grafton has a number of heritage-listed sites, including:

- North Coast railway: Grafton railway station

== Notable residents ==
Earle Page, Prime Minister of Australia from 7 April 1939 to 26 April 1939, lived in South Grafton from 1904 to 1920, where he ran a private hospital. He was elected to the municipal council in 1914, and was twice elected as mayor, in 1918 and 1919.
