= South Kempsey =

- Suburb
- Interactive map of South Kempsey
- Coordinates: 31.12302000°S 152.83253000°E
- Country: Australia
- State: New South Wales
- City: Kempsey
- LGA: Kempsey Shire

Government
  - State electorate: Oxley
  - Federal division: Cowper

Population
  - Total: 2,604 (SAL 2021)
- Postcode: 2440

South Kempsey is a suburb of Kempsey in the Kempsey Shire, New South Wales, Australia. They are separated by the Macleay River.

The 2016 census listed 2302 persons within the South Kempsey area.

== Heritage listings ==
Kempsey has a number of heritage-listed sites, including:

- North Coast railway: Macleay River railway bridge
