= Port Macquarie Campus =

Port Macquarie Campus (part of Hastings Secondary College)

Location
- 16 Owen Street, Port Macquarie, Mid North Coast, New South Wales; Australia; 31°26′S 152°55′E

Information
- Type: Government-funded co-educational comprehensive secondary day school
- Established: 1962; 64 years ago (as Port Macquarie High School)
- School district: Port Macquarie; Regional North
- Educational authority: NSW Department of Education
- Principal: Meaghan Cook
- Teaching staff: 56.6 FTE (2018)
- Enrolment: 635 (2018)
- Campus type: Regional
- Colours: Royal blue, grey and white
- Website: Official website

The Port Macquarie Campus of Hastings Secondary College is a government-funded co-educational comprehensive secondary day school campus, located in Port Macquarie in the Mid North Coast region of New South Wales, Australia.

Established in 1962, the campus enrolled approximately 635 students in 2018, from Year 7 to Year 12, of whom 14 percent identified as Indigenous Australians and nine percent were from a language background other than English. The school is operated by the NSW Department of Education; the principal is Meaghan Cook.

== Notable alumni ==
- Scott Cain – singer and presenter
- Nabil Elderkin – film and music video director and photographer
- Allison Shreeve – windsurfer
