= Afterlee, New South Wales =

Afterlee New South Wales
- Coordinates: 28°34′54.2″S 152°49′3.9″E
- Population: 32 (2021 census)
- Time zone: AEST (UTC+10)
  - Summer (DST): AEDT (UTC+11)
- LGA(s): Kyogle Council
- Region: Northern Rivers
- State electorate(s): Lismore
- Federal division(s): Page

Afterlee is a village in the Northern Rivers region of New South Wales, Australia. It sits within the Kyogle Council local government area and is located 24.3 kilometres (15.1 mi) west Kyogle. In the 2021 census it had a population of 32 people.

The Traditional owners are the Gullibul, Githabul, Wahlubal and Bundjalung peoples.

In 2021 the Afterlee Ecovillage project was created 2 kilometres (1.2 mi) from the village to meet affordable housing needs in the region.
