= Goolmangar, New South Wales =

Coordinates: 28°45′S 153°13′E

Goolmangar (GOOL-man-gah) is a village in the northern part of the Australian state of New South Wales and it is 16 kilometres (9.9 mi) from the regional centre of Lismore and it is part of City of Lismore.

It is on the lands of the Widjabal people of the Bundjalung nation who are its traditional owners.

== Origin of place name ==
The name Goolmangar comes from the Bundjalung language word for water gum, which is also known as Tristaniopsis laurina, or the place of the water gum. However, it is also suggested that it is a descriptive word given for the junction of three creeks.
