= Burringbar, New South Wales =

Village in New South Wales, Australia

Burringbar
- Town
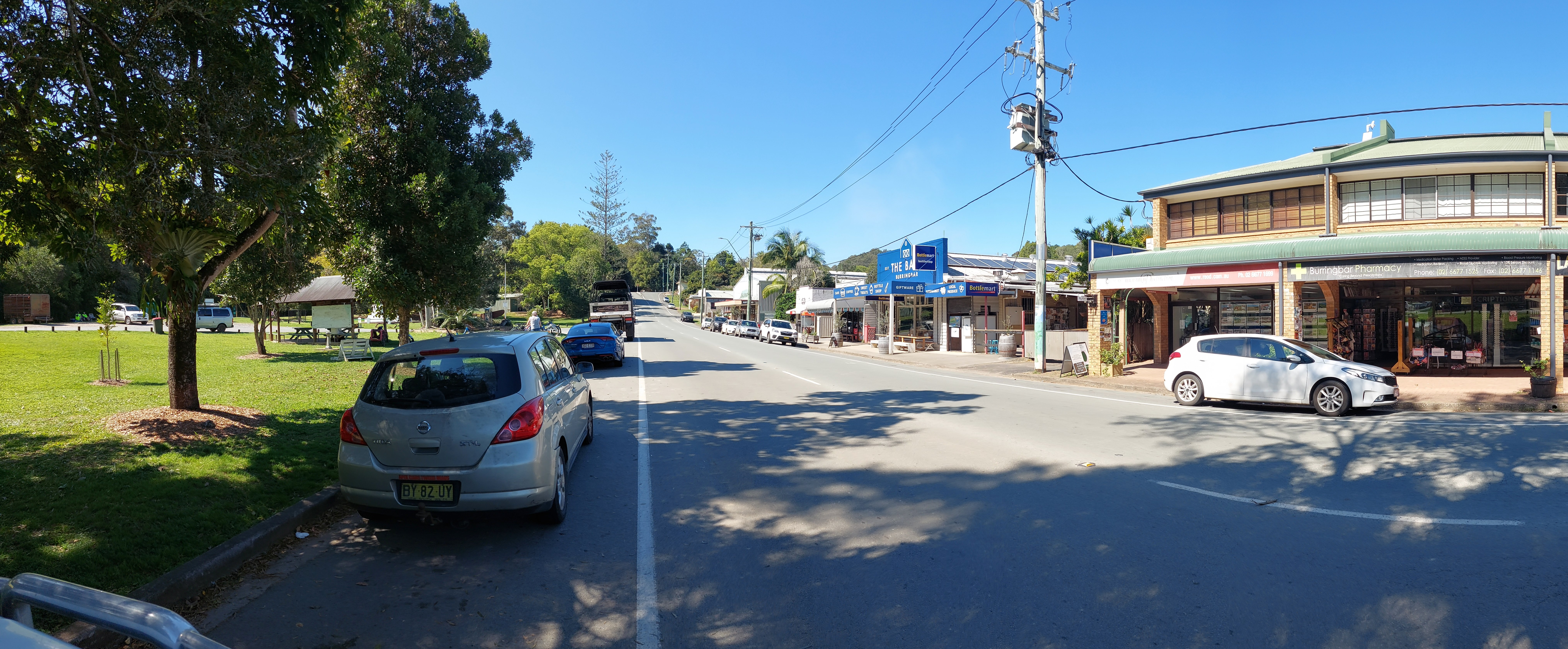
- Burringbar Broadway (main street) (2024)

- Coordinates: 28°25′S 153°20′E
- Country: Australia
- State: New South Wales
- LGA: Tweed Shire
- Location: 17 km (11 mi) SE of Murwillumbah

Government
  - State electorate: Tweed
  - Federal division: Richmond

Population
  - Total: 878 (2021 census)
- Postcode: 2483

Burringbar is a village 16 kilometres (9.9 mi) south-east of Murwillumbah in the Northern Rivers region of New South Wales, Australia. It sits within the Tweed Shire local government area and is 44 kilometres (27 mi) from the regional centre of Tweed Heads.

The traditional owners of this place are the Ngandowal and Minyungbal speaking people of the Bundjalung Nation, specifically the Goodjinburra, Tul-gi-gin, and Moorung-Moobah clans.

The Northern Rivers Rail Trail passes through it.

== History and origin of place name ==
Burringbar is named for the Yugambeh–Bundjalung language word Bunungban which is a long boomerang used in warfare and were used for striking opponents rather than throwing. It has been alternately suggested that it is taken from a combination of the words Burring (also meaning long boomerang) and the suffix '-bah' which means 'place of'.

The first European owner of the land here was Thomas Ewing who built the first colonial building there in 1888 and soon after, in 1894, Burringbar Station- part of the Murwillumbah railway line, was constructed there. With the station constructed Burringbar soon became an important stop for goods and, by the mid-1990s, up to 8 train travels through there a day; use of this railway line declined and the station was closed in 1967 and it was dismantled in the 1990s.

== Demographics ==
In the 2011 census, Burringbar recorded a population of 858 people, 48.6% female and 51.4% male.

The median age of the Burringbar population was 41 years, 4 years above the national median of 37.

81.2% of people living in Burringbar were born in Australia. The other top responses for country of birth were England 4.1%, New Zealand 1.5%, Scotland 0.9%, Germany 0.9%, Canada 0.7%.

90.4% of people spoke only English at home; the next most common languages were 1.4% Italian, 0.5% Lithuanian, 0.5% Spanish, 0.3% German, 0.3% Maltese.

The novelist Jessica Cole, otherwise known as Jessie Cole, comes from Burringbar, which is also the setting for many of her novels.

== Gallery ==
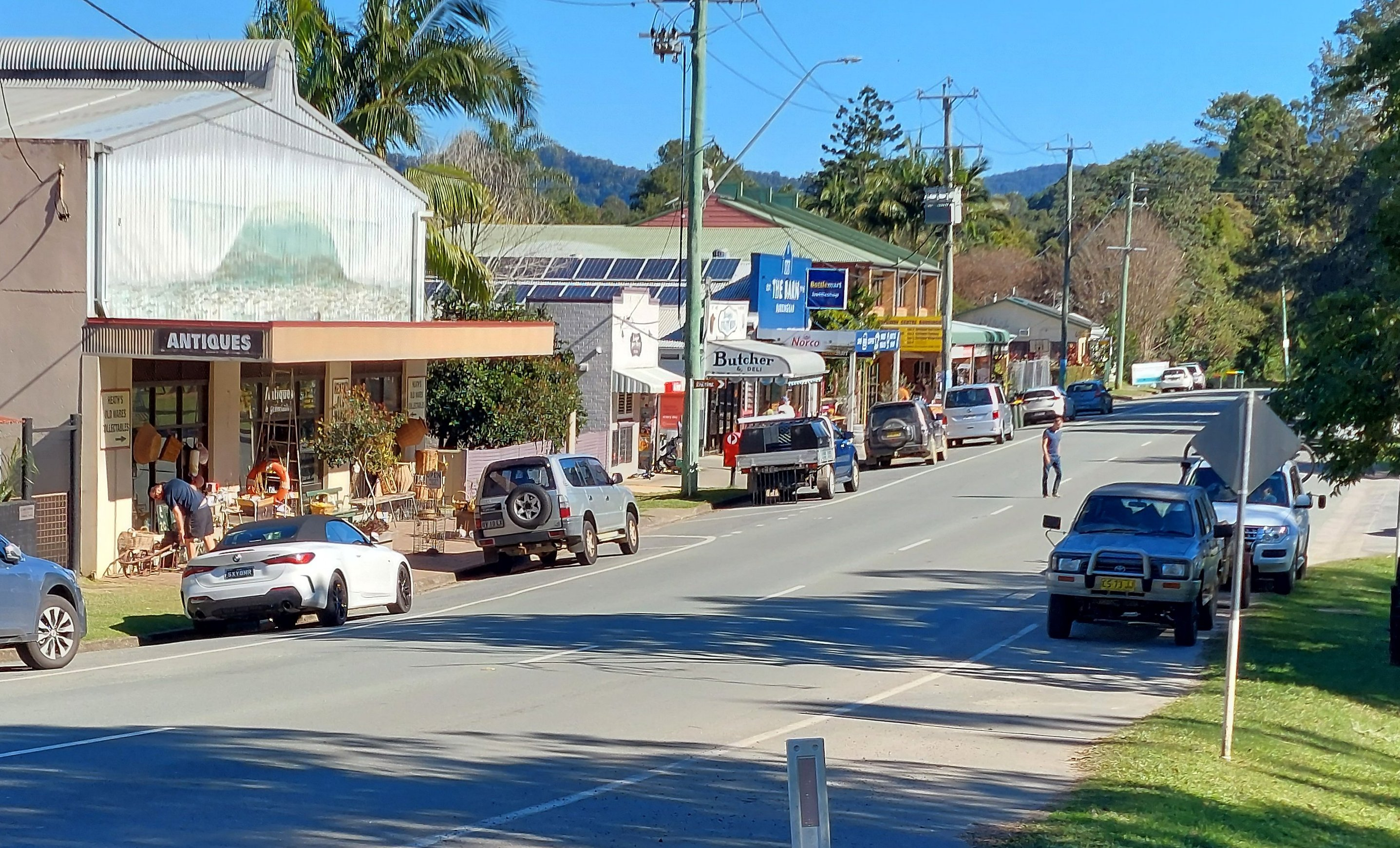
Main street of Burringbar, June 2024

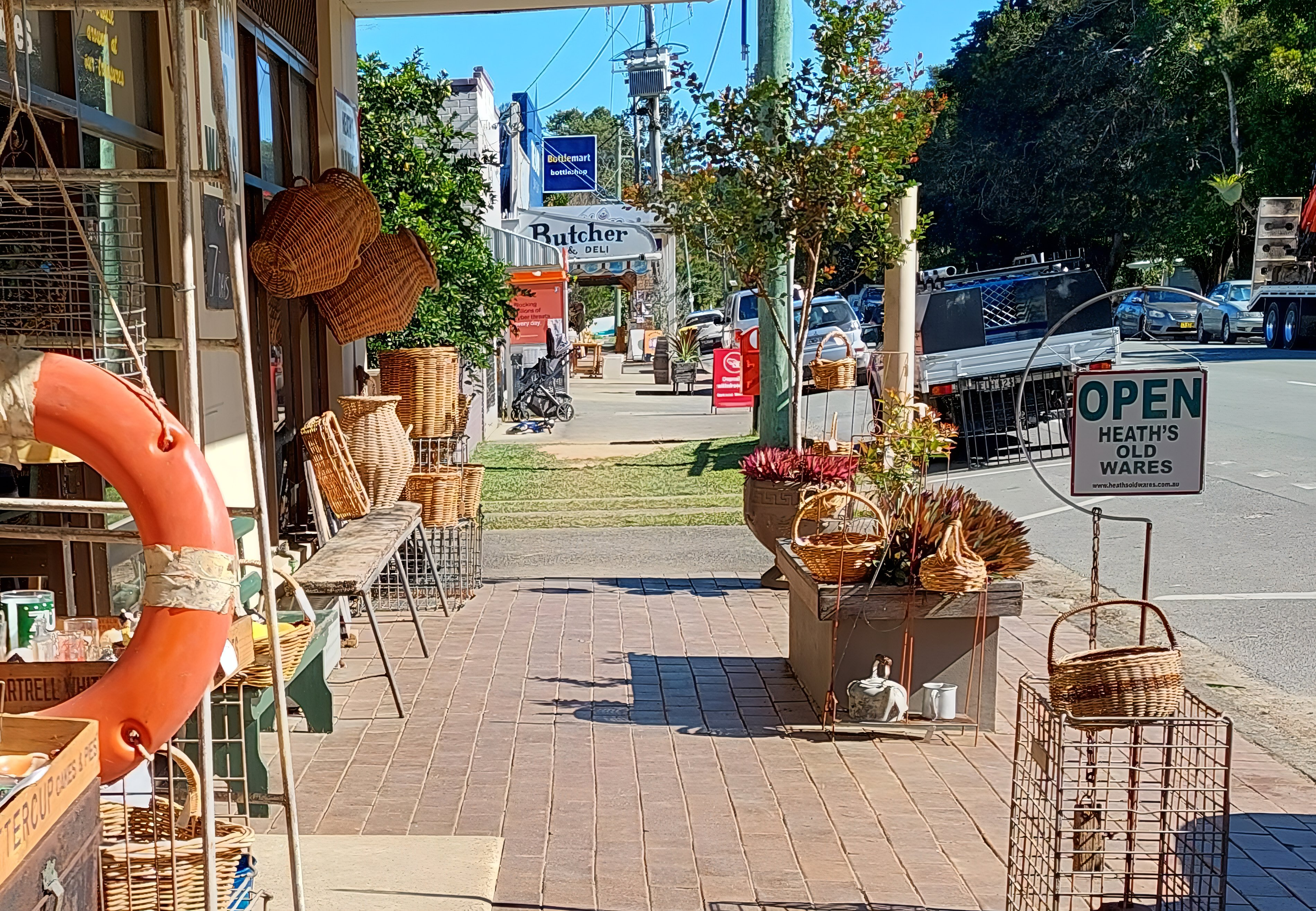
Main street of Burringbar, June 2024

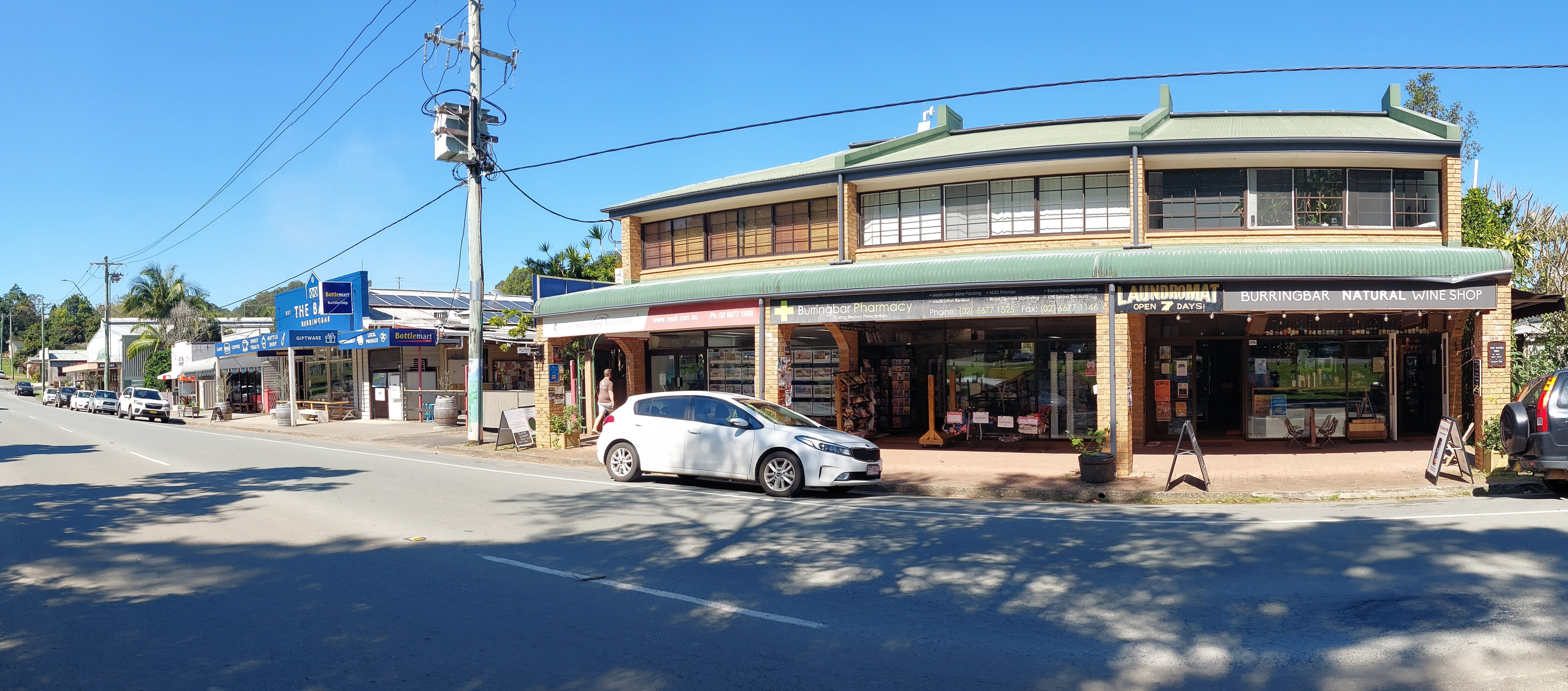
The shops at Burringbar Broadway, August 2024

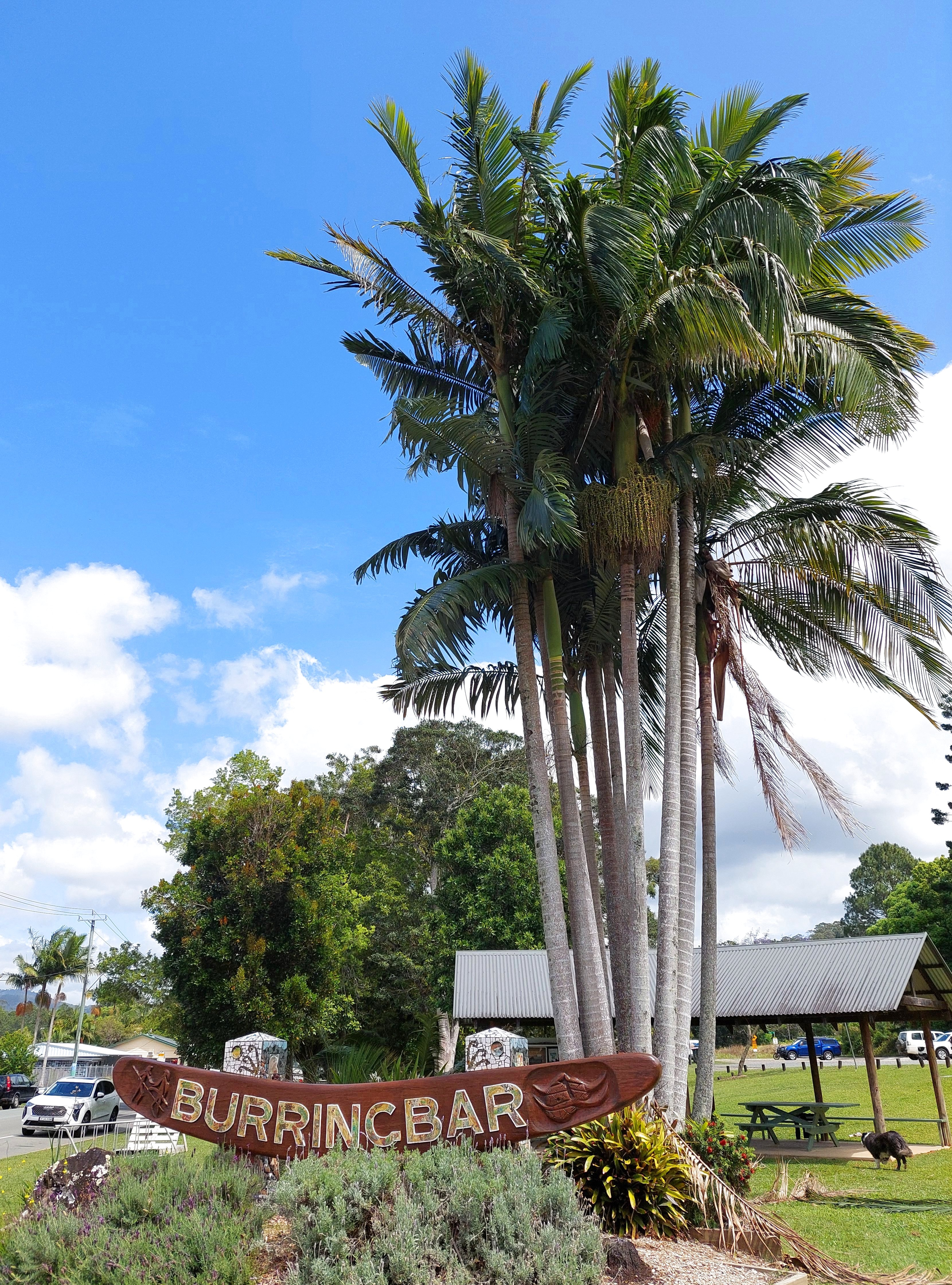
Entrance to Masterson Park, October 2024

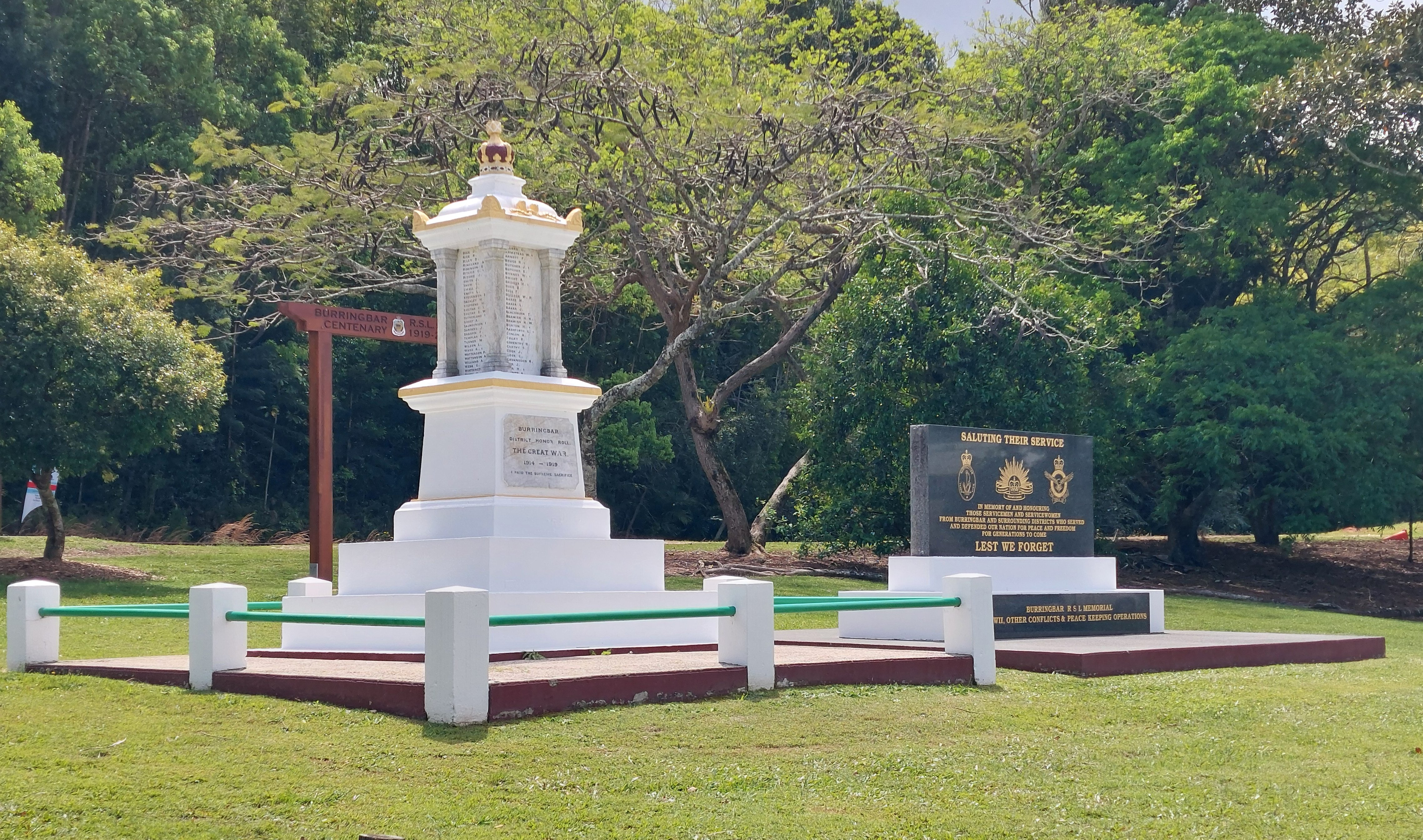
WWI and post-WWI memorials, October 2024

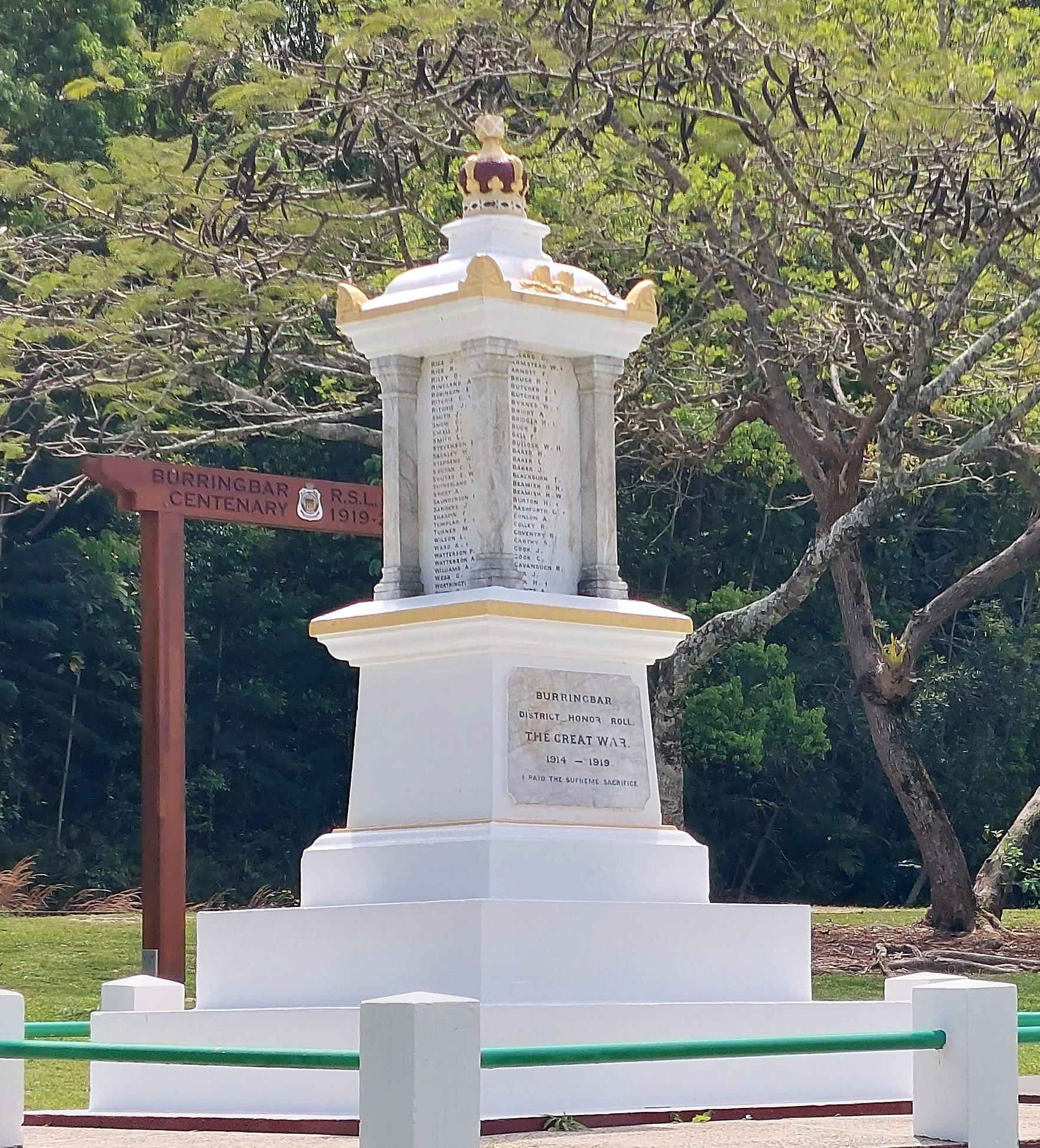
WWI memorial (detail), October 2024

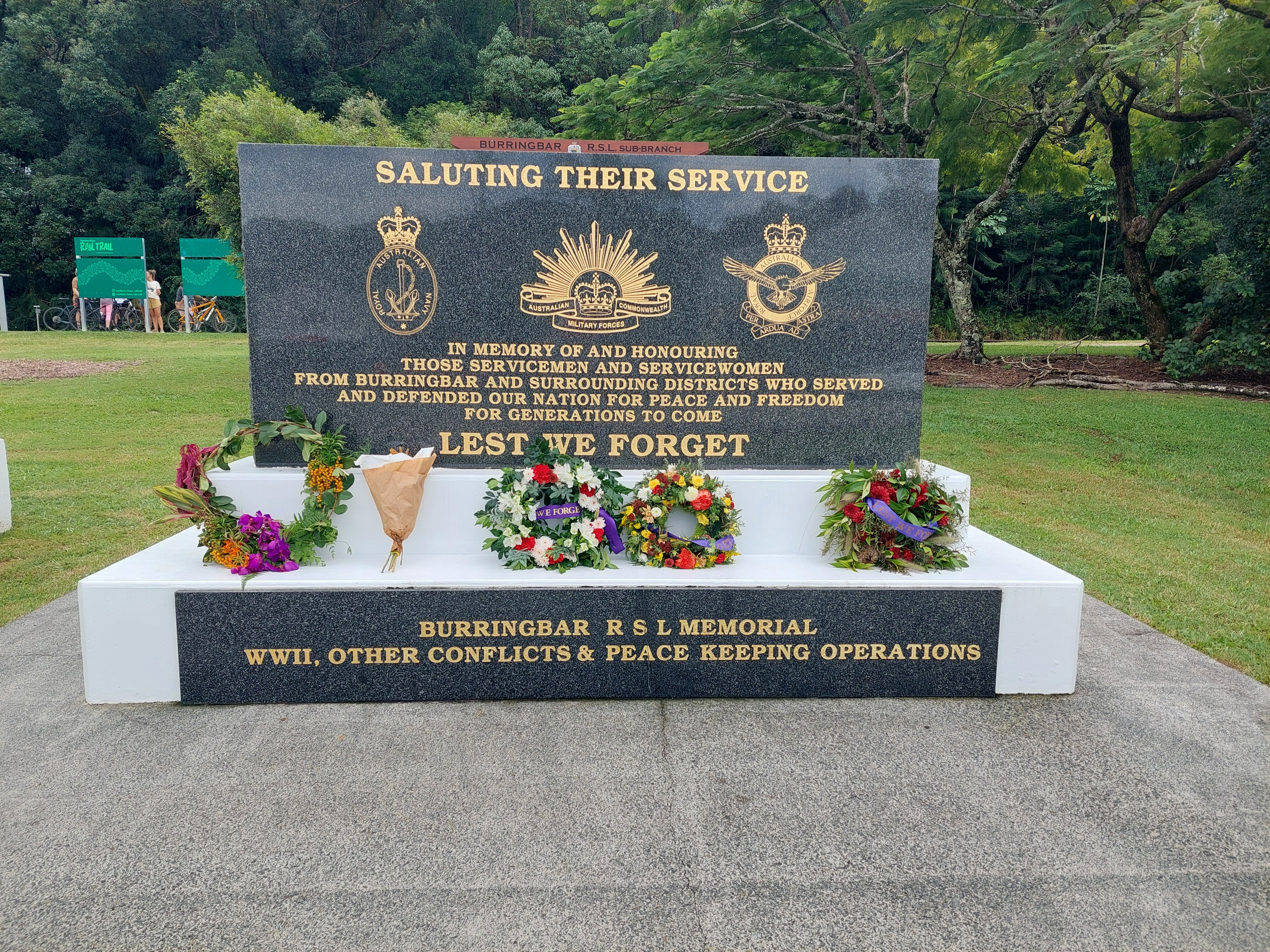
WWII memorial (detail), October 2024

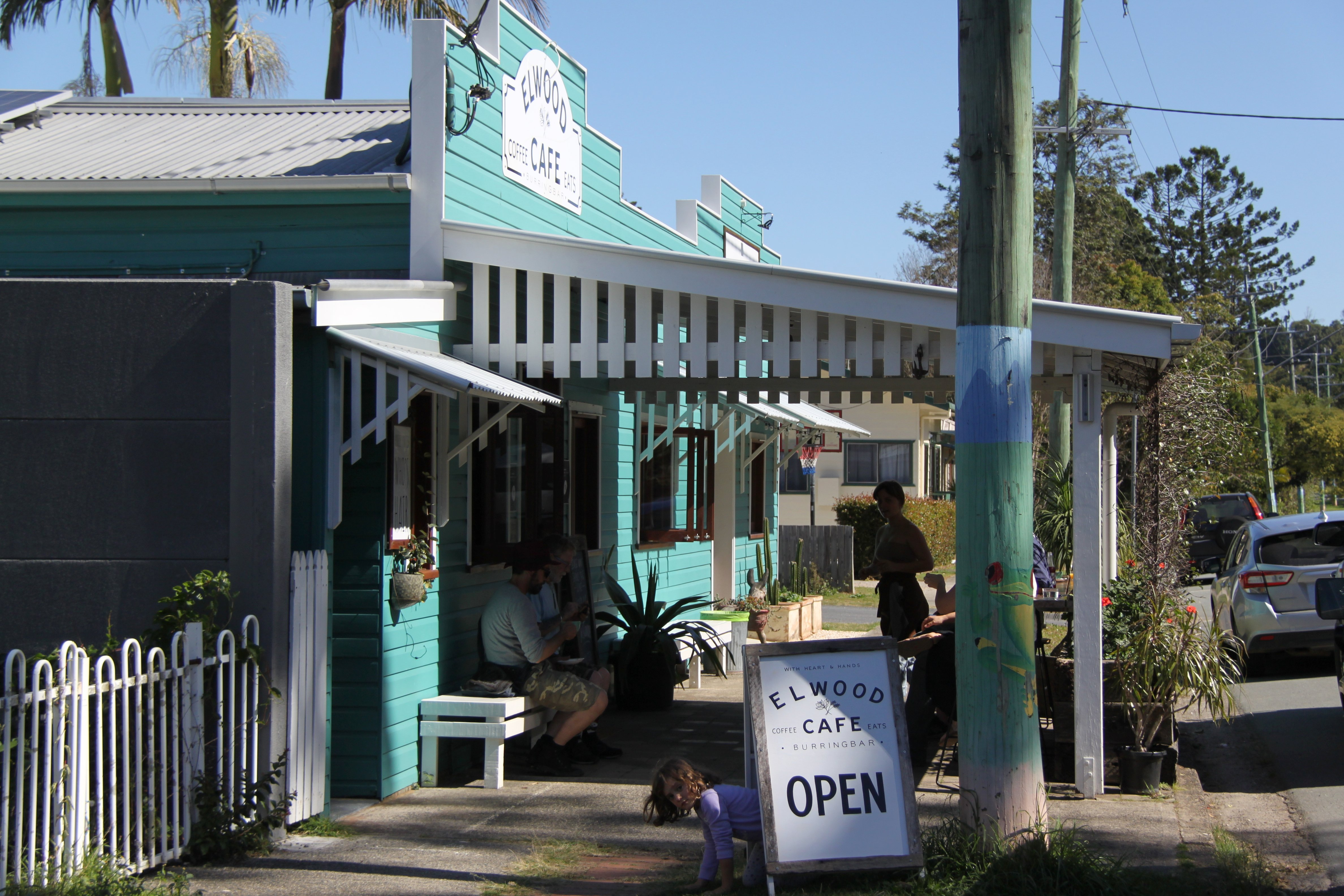
The former Elwood Cafe in Burringbar, 2020 (lost in fire 2022)

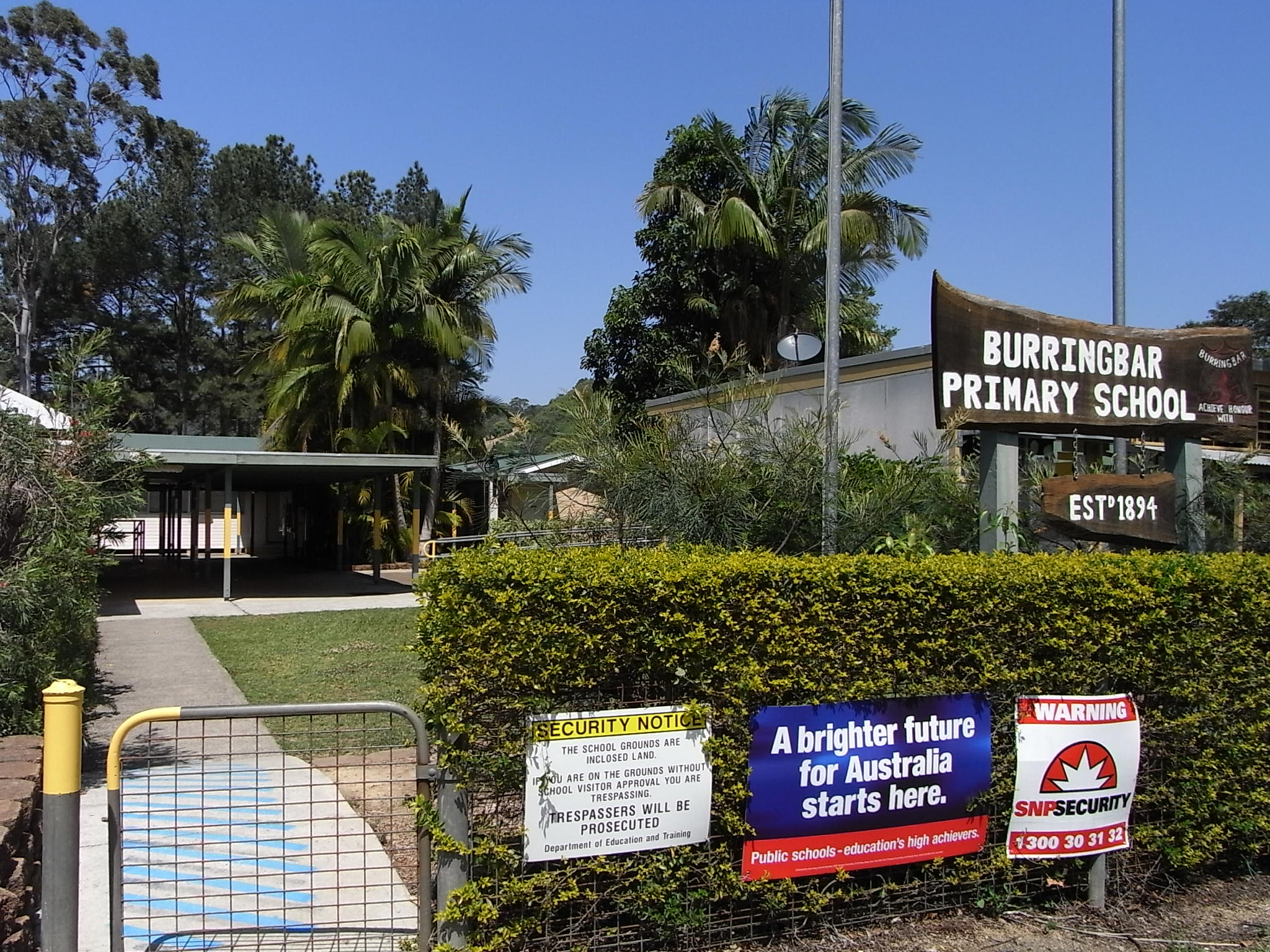
Burringbar Primary School, September 2009

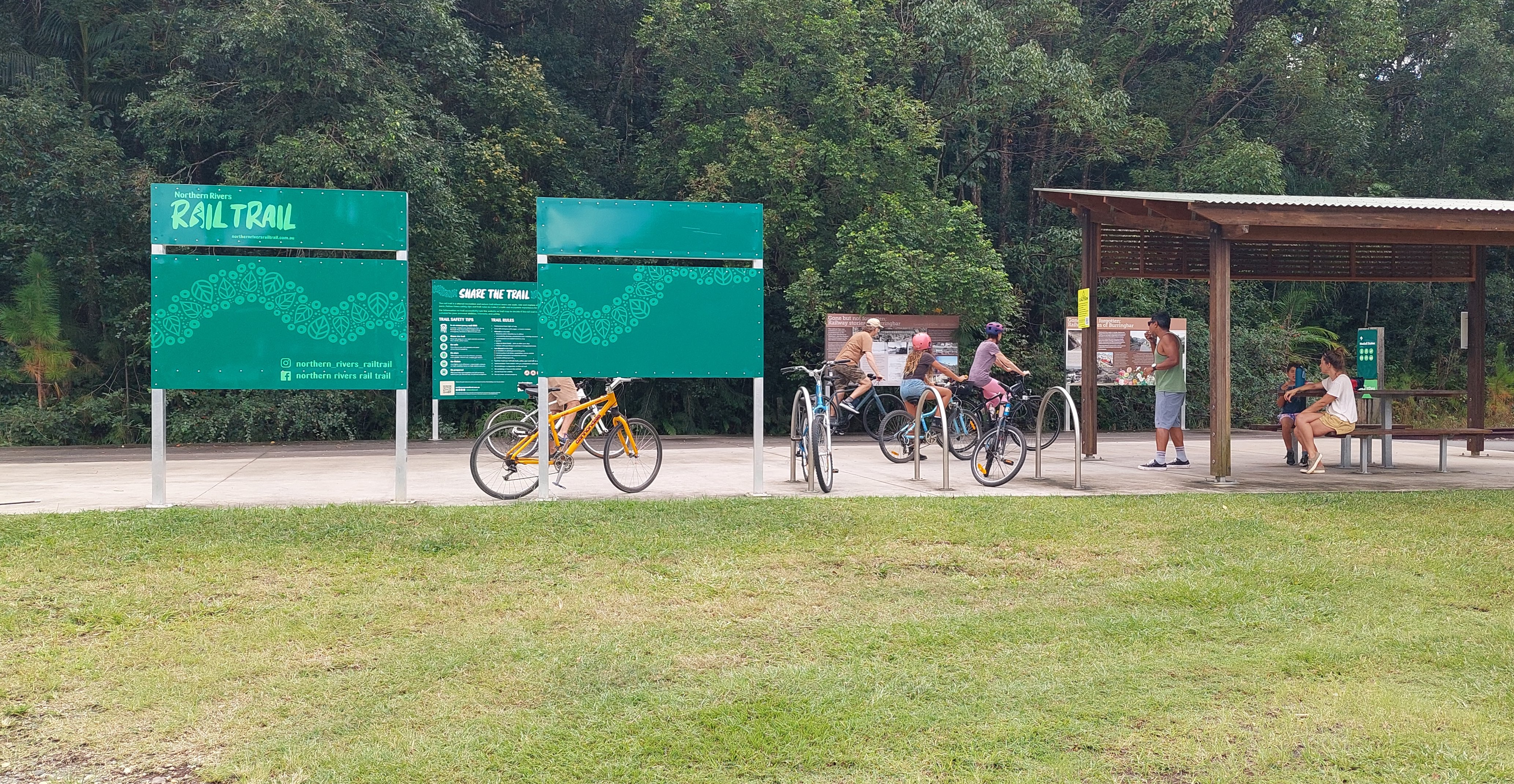
Burringbar, Northern Rivers Rail Trail stop, April 2025
