= Crabbes Creek =

Town in New South Wales, Australia

Crabbes creek
- Town
- Coordinates: 28.4554°S 153.4921°E
- Country: Australia
- State: New South Wales
- LGA: Tweed Shire

Government
  - State electorate: Tweed

Population
  - Total: 290 (2016 census)
- Time zone: +10
  - Summer (DST): +11
- Postcode: 2483

Crabbes Creek is a village located in north-eastern New South Wales, Australia, in the Tweed Shire. It is 43 kilometres (27 mi) from the regional centre of Tweed Heads and 20 kilometres (12 mi) to Mullumbimby.

The traditional owners of Crabbes Creek are the Bundjalung people, specifically the Ngandowal and Minyungbal speaking people, including the Goodjinburra, Tul-gi-gin, and Moorung-Moobah clans.

The Murwillumbah railway line used to have a station at Crabbes Creek, which opened in 1894, and the Northern Rivers Rail Trail now passes through the town.

== History and origin of place name ==
Crabbes Creek was originally known as Pymble or Pimble by the Bundjalung people living there; this meant 'stones in creek' or 'many stones' in the Bundjalung language and, after they first arrived the name Pimble Creek was adopted by many Europeans living in or around the area as an alternative to Crabbes Creek but its use faded by the 1940s.

The name Crabbes Creek was given in honour of Robert Morrison Crabbe who was a large land holder there in the 1880s.

The primary industries were, for many years, sand mining, cane and dairy farming and banana growing. Post World War II many Macedonian migrants settled in the area and it became one of the largest in New South Wales. Because of this the first Macedonian Orthodox Church in Australia was built there in 1949. This building still stands and now operates as a community hall.

== Demographics ==
In the 2016 census, Crabbes Creek recorded a population of 290 people, a decrease from the 294 people recorded in 2011. 48.8% of residents are female and 51.2% male.

The median age of the Crabbes Creek population was 48 years.

In Crabbes Creek 76.8% of people were born in Australia. The only other responses for country of birth were Germany 3.5%, England 2.5%, New Zealand 1.1% and Greece 1.1%.

In Crabbes Creek, 76.5% of people only spoke English at home. The only other responses for language spoken at home were German 3.0%, Spanish 1.0%, Italian 1.0% and Macedonian 1.0%.
