= Bentley, New South Wales =

Bentley
- Town
- Coordinates: 28°46′54″S 153°7′4″E
- Country: Australia
- State: New South Wales
- Region: Northern Rivers
- LGAs: City of Lismore; Kyogle

Government
  - State electorate: Lismore
  - Federal division: Page

Population
  - Total: 225 (2021 census)
- Time zone: UTC+10 (AEST)
  - Summer (DST): UTC+11 (AEDT)

Bentley is a locality in the Northern Rivers region of New South Wales and it is 23 kilometres (14 mi) north-west of the regional centre of Lismore. It sits within the local government area of Richmond Valley Council.

The traditional owners of this area are the Widjabul people of the Bundjalung nation.

Section 2 of the Northern Rivers Rail Trail ends here at the historic Bentley Bridge.

== Origin of place name ==
The name Bentley was first used as the name for the pastoral property of Robert Barrington Dawson, who was the former commissioner of Crown Lands for the region in the 1870s, who named it after his birthplace Great Bentley in Essex. He ran this property between 1881 and his death in 1891.

The Widjabul name for this place is Wombee which is thought to mean shack, hut, humpy or collection of huts.

== Demographics ==
As of the 2021 Australian census, 225 people resided in Bentley, up from 197 in the 2016 census. The median age of persons in Bentley was 53 years. There were more males than females, with 52.8% of the population male and 47.2% female. The average household size was 2.6 people per household.
