= North Arm, New South Wales =

North Arm New South Wales
- Coordinates: 28°19′49″S 153°20′32″E
- Population: 117 (2021 census)
- Postcode(s): 2484
- LGA(s): Tweed Shire
- State electorate(s): Lismore
- Federal division(s): Richmond

North Arm is a locality in the Tweed Shire of New South Wales, Australia. It had a population of 117 as of the 2021 census.
