= Carool, New South Wales =

Town in New South Wales, Australia

Coordinates: 28°14′S 153°25′E

Carool
- Town
- Country: Australia
- State: New South Wales
- LGA: Tweed Shire

Government
  - State electorate: Tweed
  - Federal division: Richmond

Population
  - Total: 459 (2011 census)
- Time zone: UTC+10 (AEST)
  - Summer (DST): UTC+11 (AEDT)
- Postcode: 2486

Carool is a town in the Tweed Shire in north-eastern New South Wales, Australia.

The Ngandowal and Minyungbal speaking people of the Bundjalung people are the traditional owners of the Tweed region, including Carool, and the surrounding areas.

== Demographics ==
In the 2011 census, Carool recorded a population of 459 people, 45.5% female and 54.5% male.

The median age of the Carool population was 42 years, 5 years above the national median of 37.

72.5% of people living in Carool were born in Australia. The other top responses for country of birth were New Zealand 2%, Scotland 1.3%, England 1.1%, Germany 0.7%, Barbados 0.7%.

79.6% of people spoke only English at home; the next most common languages were 1.1% Polish, 1.1% German.
