= Woodlawn, New South Wales =

Woodlawn New South Wales
- Coordinates: 28°45′58.3″S 153°19′5.8″E
- Population: 45 (2021 census)
- Time zone: AEST (UTC+10)
  - Summer (DST): AEDT (UTC+11)
- LGA(s): City of Lismore
- Region: Northern Rivers
- State electorate(s): Lismore
- Federal division(s): Page

Woodlawn is a locality in the Northern Rivers region of New South Wales, Australia. It sits within the City of Lismore local government area and is located 8 kilometres (5.0 mi) north-east of Lismorenearby to the village of Bexhill. In the 2021 census it had a population of 45 people.

The Traditional owners are the Widjabul and Wia-bal people of the Bundjalung Nation.

== Origin of place name ==
The name Woodlawn is a descriptive one as this area was once thick jungle and is now clear. It was known to early European settles as 'Calico Grass'.
