= Georgica =

Georgica may refer to:

- Georgica (film), a 1998 Estonian film directed by Sulev Keedus
- Georgica (journal), an academic journal specialized in the Kartvelian studies
- Georgica, New South Wales, a small rural locality within the bounds of the City of Lismore, New South Wales, Australia
- Georgica curiosa, a 17th-century, German agricultural encyclopedia compiled by Wolf Helmhardt von Hohberg
- Georgica Pond, a coastal lagoon in New York, United States
- A British tenpin bowling company, reconstituted in 2009 as Essenden plc.
- Georgics (Latin: Georgica), a poem in four books by Virgil
