= Booerie Creek, New South Wales =

Booerie Creek New South Wales
- Coordinates: 28°46′36″S 153°15′22″E
- Population: 130 (2021 census)
- Time zone: AEST (UTC+10)
  - Summer (DST): AEDT (UTC+11)
- LGA(s): City of Lismore
- Region: Northern Rivers
- State electorate(s): Lismore
- Federal division(s): Page

Booerie Creek is a locality in the Northern Rivers region of New South Wales, Australia. It sits within the City of Lismore local government area and is approximately 4.6 kilometres (2.9 mi) from the regional centre of Lismore.

The traditional owners of this area are the Widjabul people of the Bundjalung nation.

In 2021 census, Booerie Creek had a population of 130 people.
