= Tregeagle, New South Wales =

Tregeagle New South Wales
- Coordinates: 28°50′54.2″S 153°21′3.9″E
- Population: 428 (2021 census)
- Time zone: AEST (UTC+10)
  - Summer (DST): AEDT (UTC+11)
- LGA(s): City of Lismore
- Region: Northern Rivers
- State electorate(s): Lismore
- Federal division(s): Page

Tregeagle (tr'-GHEE-g'l) is a locality in the Northern Rivers region of New South Wales, Australia. It sits within the City of Lismore local government area and is located 12 kilometres (7.5 mi) south-east of Lismore. In the 2021 census it had a population of 428 people.

The Traditional owners are the Widjabul and Wia-bal people of the Bundjalung Nation.

== Origin of place name ==
Like the nearby Repentance Creek early European settlers referred to this area as Boggy Creek but the name was later changed to a name which was, before then, being used at a local property owned by the Anstey family. The name change occurred around 1920.

The name Tregeagle is derived from the Bundjalung language word Dirrigeagle which is a kind of local gorse.
