= Corndale =

Corndale may refer to:

- Corndale, New South Wales, a locality in the City of Lismore, Australia
- Corndale, Queensland, a locality in the South Burnett Region, Queensland, Australia
- Corndale, Victoria, a locality in the Shire of Glenelg, Victoria, Australia
