= Nightcap National Park =

National park in New South Wales, Australia

- IUCN category II (national park)
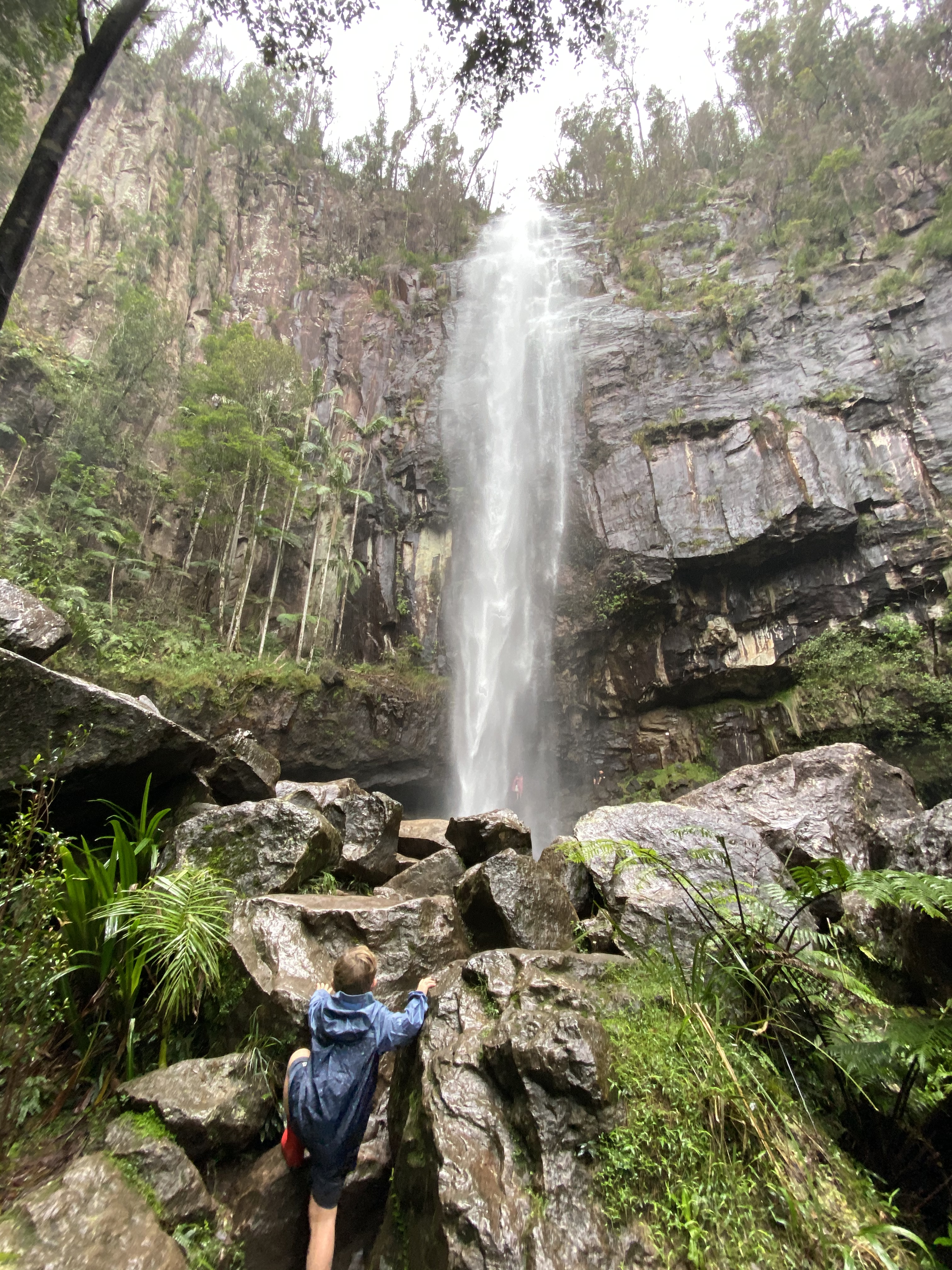
- Protesters Falls in the ancient rainforest of Nightcap National Park

- Location within New South Wales
- Location: New South Wales
- Nearest city: Lismore
- Coordinates: 28°32′38″S 153°17′35″E
- Area: 81 km^{2} (31 sq mi)
- Established: 22 April 1983
- Governing body: NSW National Parks & Wildlife Service
- Website: Official website

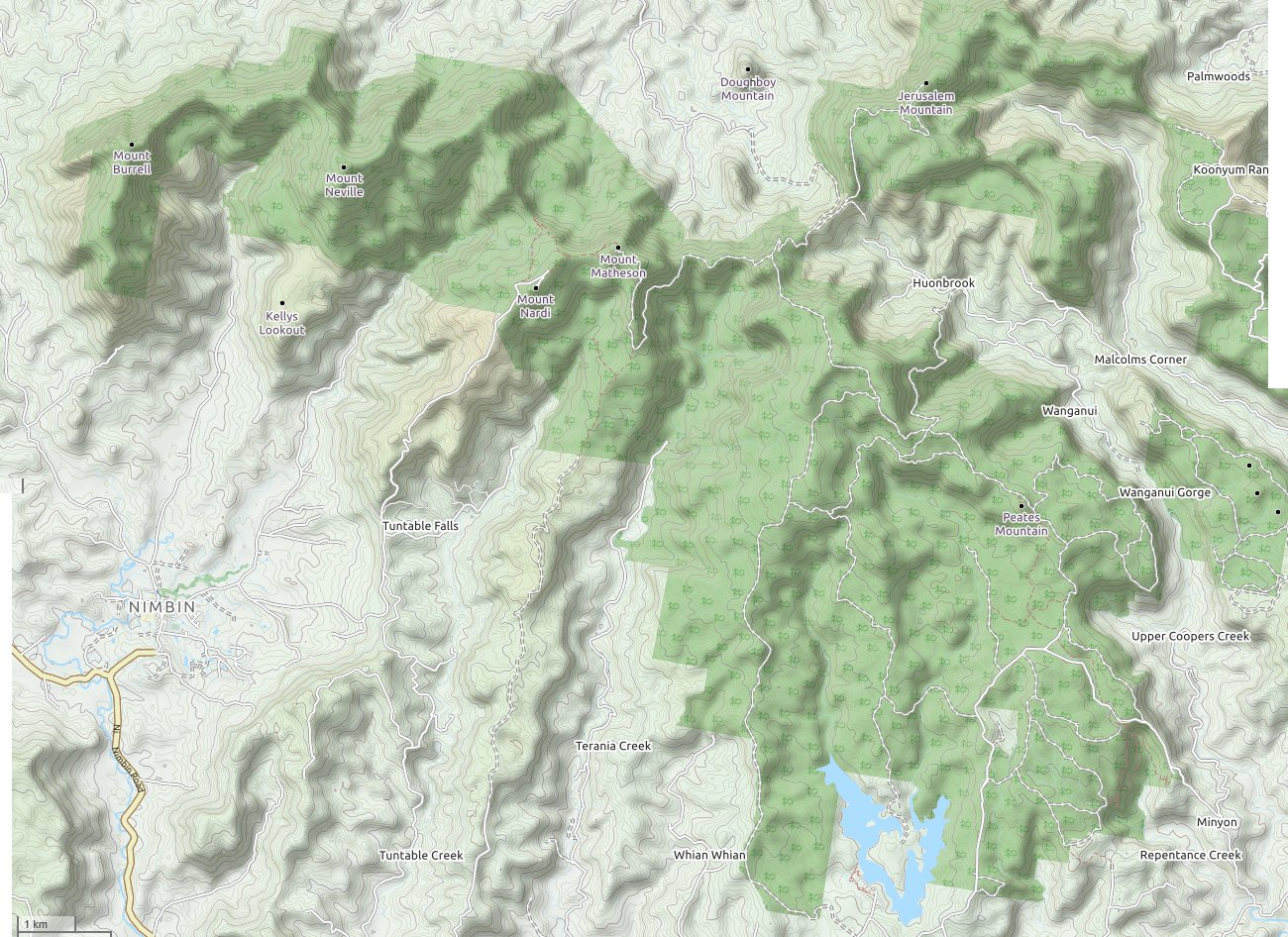
The Nightcap Range - map from OpenStreetMap. The main area highlighted in green is the Nightcap National Park, also including the Whian Whian State Conservation Area.

The Nightcap National Park is a national park situated within the Nightcap Range in the Northern Rivers region of New South Wales, Australia. The 8,080-hectare (20,000-acre) park was created in April 1983 and is situated 35 kilometres (22 mi) north of Lismore. The park was established following campaigns and blockades against logging at Terania Creek, Grier's Scrub and Mount Nardi between 1979 and 1982. Sections of the Whian Whian state forest were added to it following blockading and campaigning in 1998. The national park is classed by the IUCN World Commission on Protected Areas as Category II and is part of the Shield Volcano Group of the World Heritage Site Gondwana Rainforests of Australia inscribed in 1986 and added to the Australian National Heritage List in 2007.

== Regional geology and climate ==
The park is on the south-eastern edge of the Mount Warning erosion caldera. Creating features of gullies, ridges and a massif of peaks that form the eroded remnants of the Tweed shield volcano. The tallest peak at Nightcap is Mount Burrell also known as Blue Knob with an elevation of 933m above sea level. The Nightcap Range is mostly situated in the park and is a spur off the Great Dividing Range.

The basalt and rhyolite lava that once flowed from the Tweed volcano (known as Mount Warning), which erupted over 23 million years ago, has produced various vegetation communities. On soil with a rhyolitic base is warm temperate rainforest that covers much of the park, and the nutrient rich basalt soil produces sub-tropical rainforest.

Nightcap has the highest rainfall in NSW with rain exceeding 2500mm per annum. The mean temperature ranges from 19.1 °C to 29.7 °C; the region can experience high humidity and temperatures can get close to 40 °C. High rainfall events and storms of cyclonic strength can occur during the summer.

== Aboriginal heritage ==
Several Aboriginal communities inhabited the region and had a spiritual connection to the land, including the Wiyabal people, Nganduwal people, and Galibal, Githabul speaking peoples. The Wiyabal people lived at Nightcap Range for at least 4000 years. The region is the base for the Bundjalung nation. Historically the park provides rock shelters for the Aboriginal people. The park's landscapes, plants and animals feature prominently in Aboriginal culture and dreaming stories and there are sacred sites of high cultural significance in the area.

== Park history ==
Before it became a national park, it provided the historic link between the Richmond and Tweed valleys known as the Historic Nightcap Track. It provided the first bridle track in 1871 and as of 1874 a telegraph line between the two valleys. A section of this historic link is now part of a walking track at the park.

The beginning of the modern conservation movement involving direct action occurred during 1972 to 1982 in the upper Northern Rivers region. The conservation campaigns started in an attempt to prevent further logging of the rainforest in the region. Terania Creek at Nightcap was the site of the first rainforest anti-logging demonstrations in Australia. By 1979 the campaign against logging increased in intensity, starting an event known as the three-year Rainforest War involving a group of dedicated activists being supported by NSW Premier Neville Wran. At one point, 100 people took radical action, forming a human barricade to block bulldozers.

"So overpowering was the draw of these trees that people risked their lives. A spirit of transformation emanated from the forest." - Ian Cohen, Green MLC, 1997

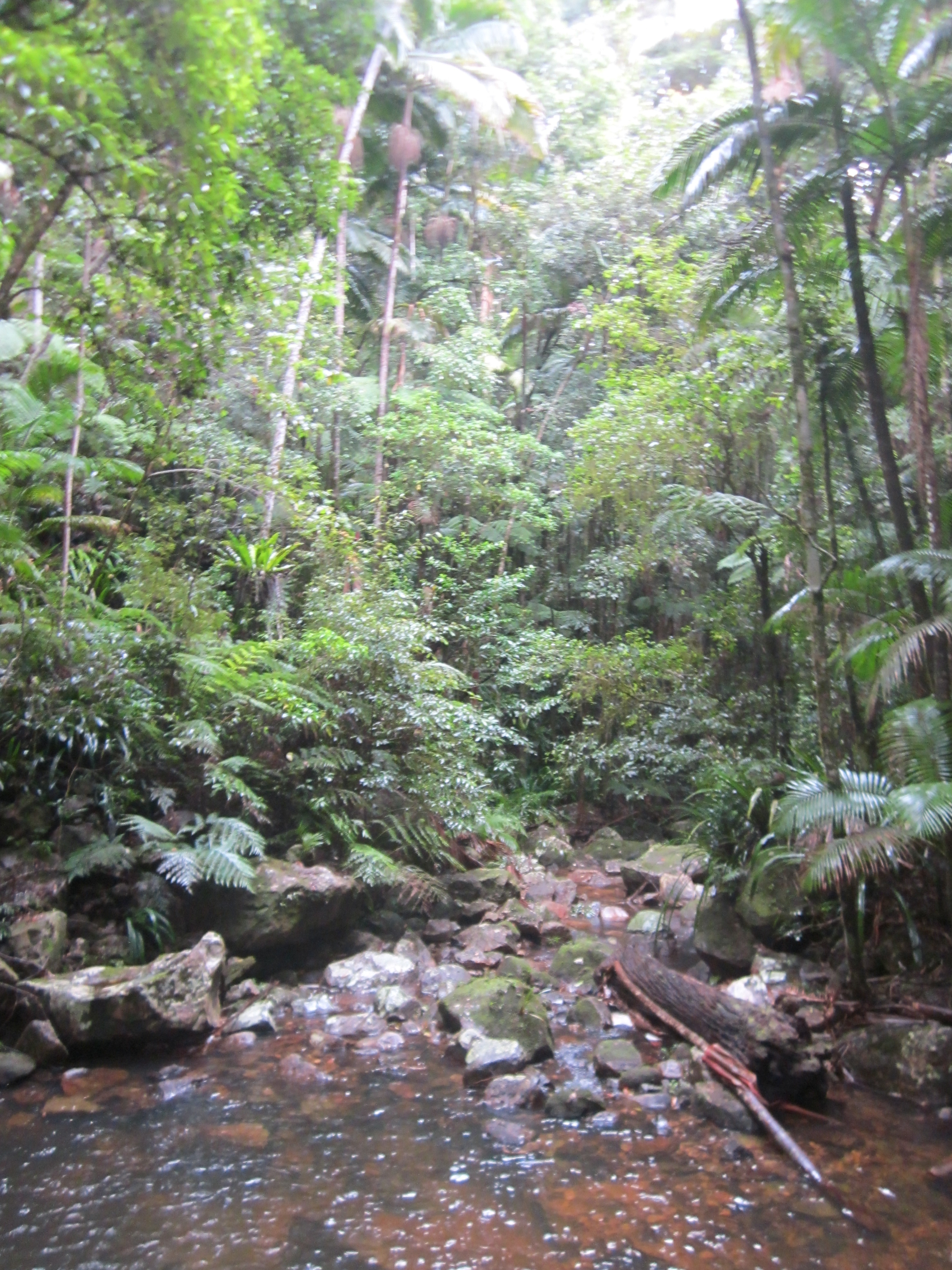
Rainforest ecosystem in the World Heritage area

Nightcap became a national park in 1983 under the Forestry Revocation and National Park Reservation Act 1983 (NSW) involving an area of the former Goonimbar State Forest (SF). The remainder of Goonimbar SF and part of Whian Whian SF were added to the national park later that year. By 1989 UNESCO created world heritage protection for 41 reserves in south-eastern Queensland and north-eastern NSW including the western half of Nightcap. The world heritage area is known as the Gondwana Rainforests of Australia that protects several remnants of subtropical rainforest with high biodiversity and unique geological landforms, with evolutionary links to Gondwana.

In 2009 BirdLife International identified the Nightcap Range as important bird and biodiversity areas (IBA). The Nightcap Range IBA includes Nightcap NP, Mount Jerusalem NP, Goonengerry NP and Whian Whian State Conservation Area (SCA). It has been recognised for its populations of Albert's lyrebird (Menura alberti), green catbird (Ailuroedus crassirostris), pale-yellow robin (Tregellasia capito), Australian logrunner (Orthonyx temminckii), paradise riflebird (Ptiloris paradiseus) and regent bowerbird (Sericulus chrysocephalus).

== Ecology ==
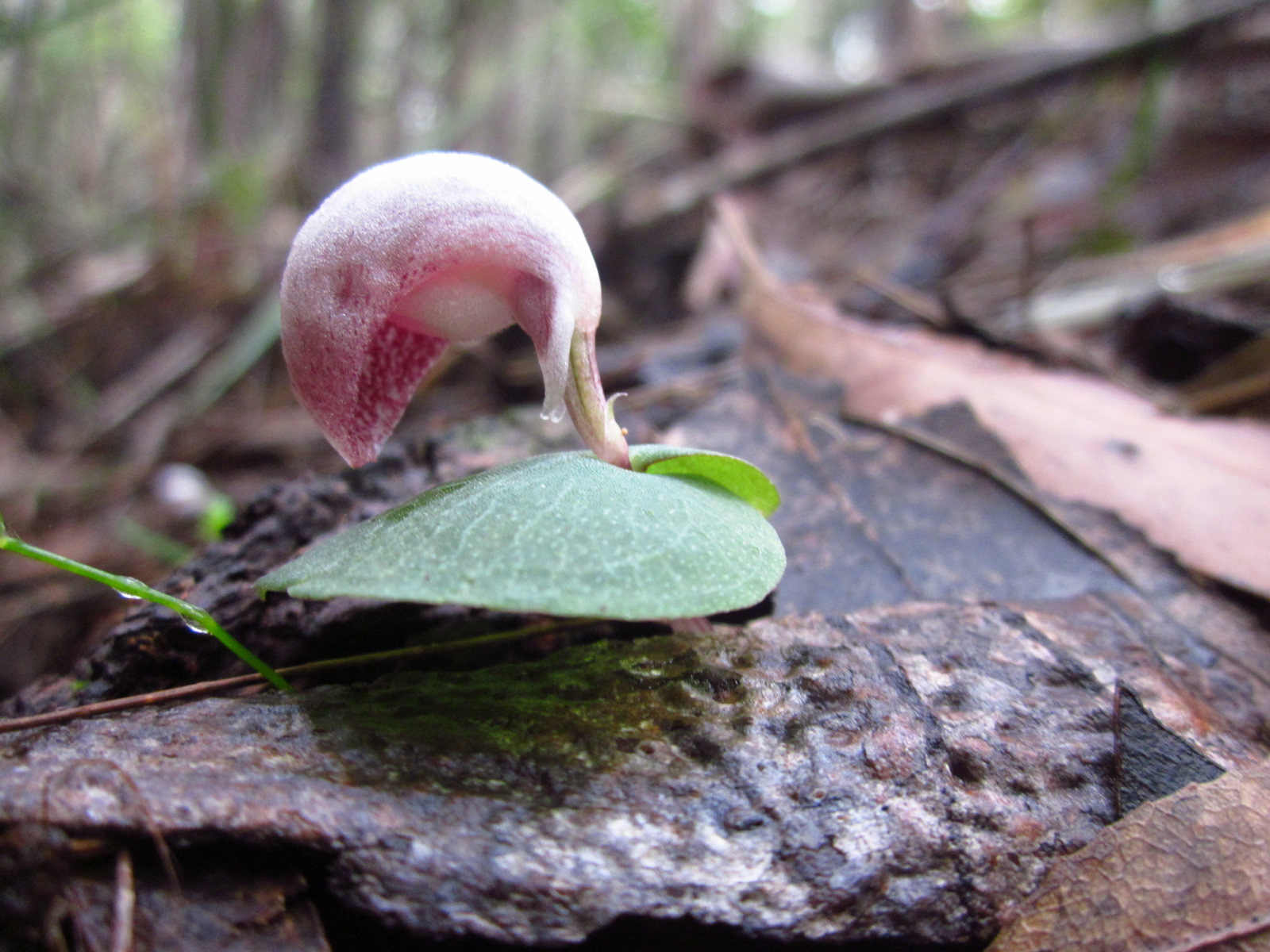
Spurred helmet orchid (Corybas aconitiflorus) at Nightcap NP

Approximately 70% of Nightcap NP is covered by a variety of rainforest communities, and the rest is covered by mostly wet sclerophyll forest and partly dry sclerophyll forest. The park also supports lowland species of the former Big Scrub, which was the largest area of subtropical lowland rainforest that was intensively cleared; now less than 1% remains. Of all the known native vascular flora in NSW about 10% of it can be found here with 72 that are identified as threatened with extinction. The park supports a rich diversity of species that includes more than 40 species of mammals, 27 reptiles, 23 frogs, over 140 bird species, over 650 known plant species including numerous ferns and various orchids, and a diverse variety of fungus and lichens.

As of 2011, Forests of East Australia became the 35th Biodiversity Hotspot, which includes Nightcap NP. The concept of the Biodiversity Hotspot is that there are "exceptional concentrations of endemic species that are undergoing exceptional loss of habitat".

== Threatened flora and fauna ==
=== Mammals ===
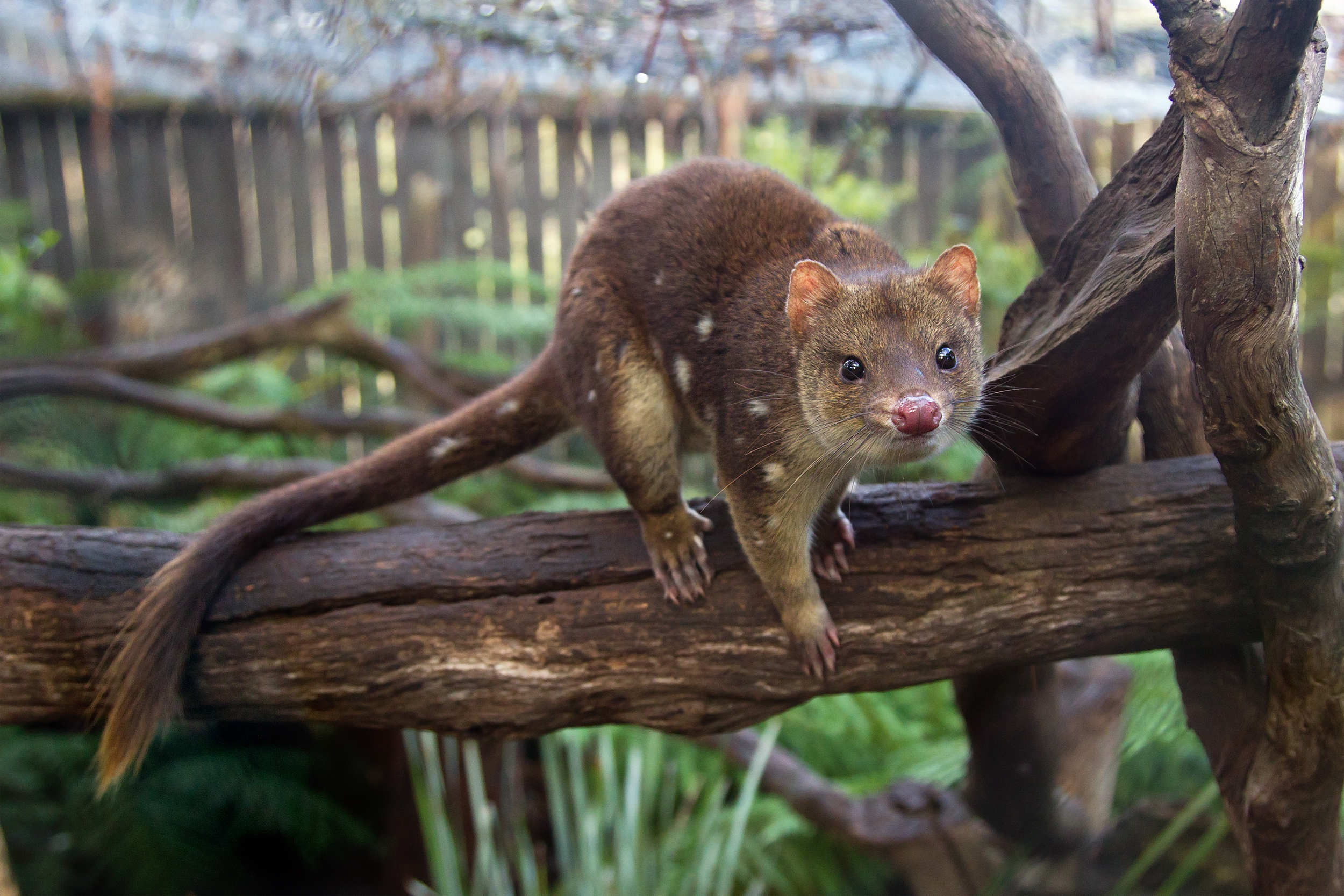
Spotted-tailed quoll (Dasyurus maculatus)

Spotted-tailed quoll (Dasyurus maculatus) is an endangered species listed on the EPBC Act. It is a medium-sized marsupial carnivore, the largest of the Dasyurus species, distinguished by the white spots on the tail. The koala (Phascolarctos cinereus) is listed as vulnerable under the EPBC Act. The Parma wallaby (Macropus parma) is listed as vulnerable in NSW under the NSW Threatened Species Conservation Act 1995 (TSC Act), is a small nocturnal, cryptic wallaby that was once thought to be extinct. Another species listed as vulnerable under the TSC Act is the yellow-bellied glider (Petaurus australis) often found in old-growth wet sclerophyll forests. The rufous bettong (Aepyprymnus rufescens) is a roughly 3 kg marsupial that has significantly declined in range since European settlement. Long-nosed potoroo (Potorous tridactylus) and red-legged pademelon (Thylogale stigmatica) are also listed.

=== Bats ===
Many microbat and megabat species inhabit the park, several of which are threatened. The following bats are listed as vulnerable on the TSC Act: greater broad-nosed bat (Scoteanax rueppellii), eastern long-eared bat (Nyctophilus bifax), golden-tipped bat (Kerivoula papuensis), eastern false pipistrelle (Falsistrellus tasmaniensis), large-eared pied bat (Chalinolobus dwyeri), yellow-bellied sheathtail-bat (Saccolaimus flaviventris), eastern tube-nosed bat (Nyctimene robinsoni), little bentwing-bat (Miniopterus australis), Eastern bentwing-bat (Miniopterus schreibersii oceanensis) and southern myotis (Myotis macropus).

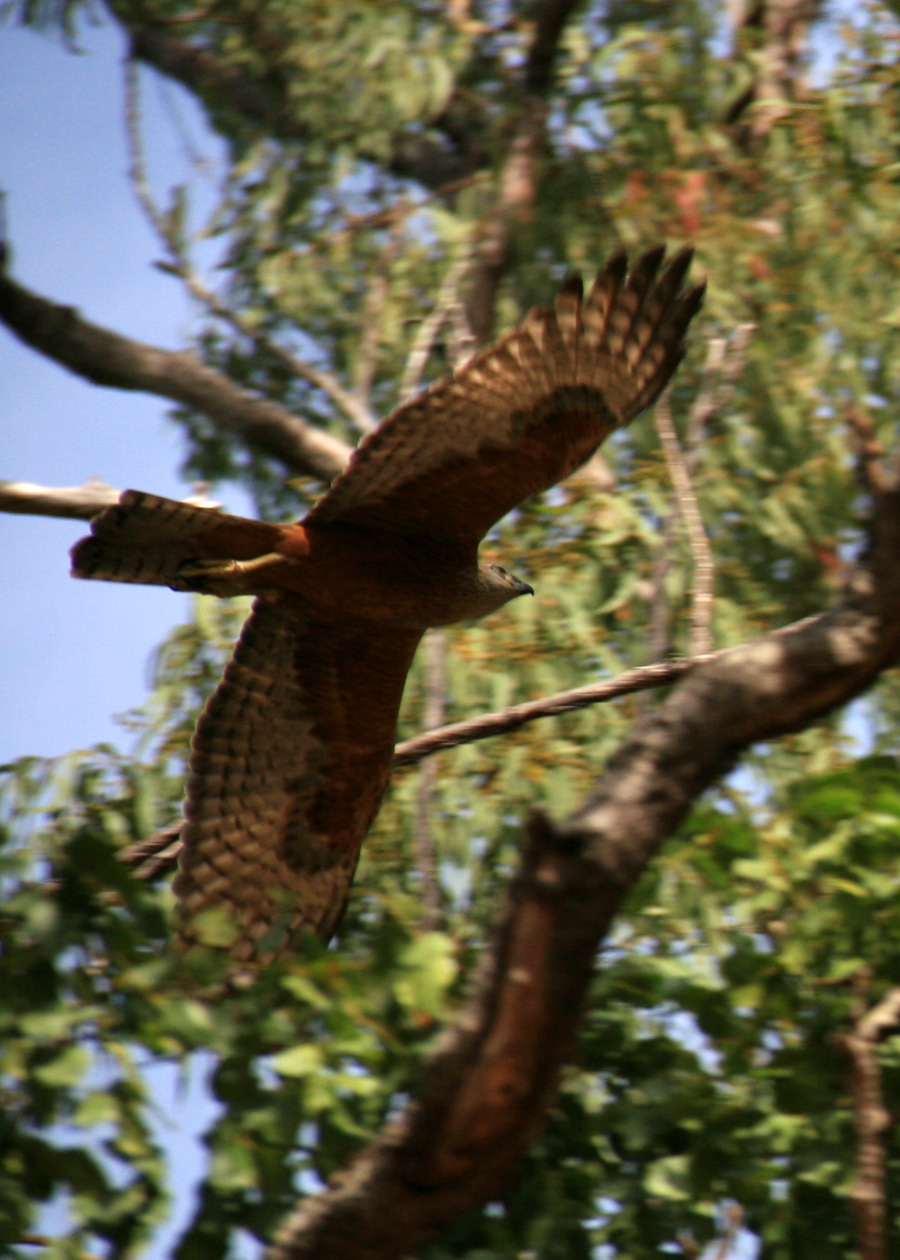
Red goshawk (Erythrotriorchis radiatus)

=== Birds ===
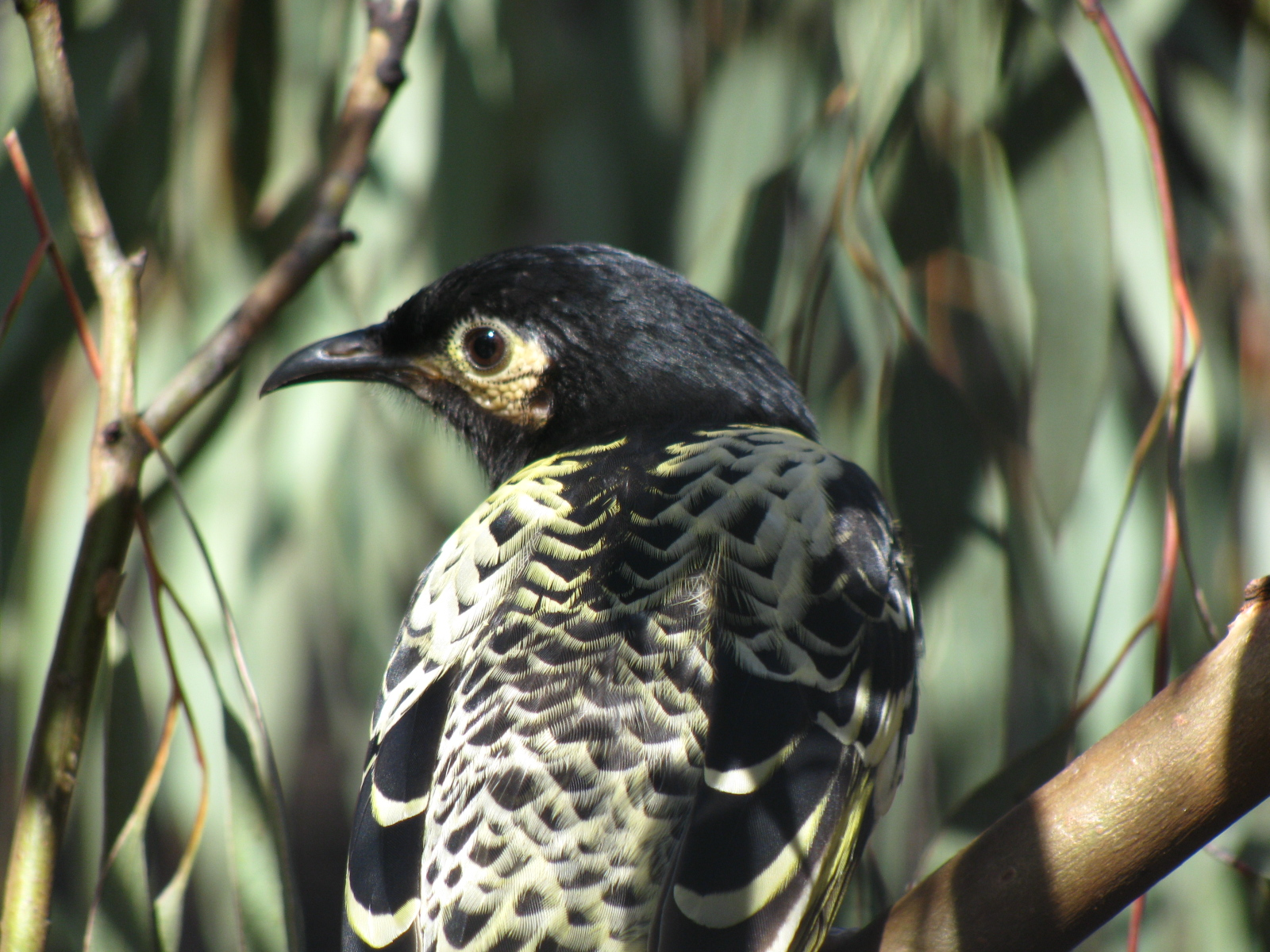
Regent honeyeater (Anthochaera phrygia)

The red goshawk (Erythrotriorchis radiatus) is listed as critically endangered under the TSC Act and is vulnerable under the EPBC Act. It is a large raptor with a wingspan of up to 60 cm that often preys upon smaller birds. It can be found nesting in tall trees along riparian vegetation. The black-breasted button-quail (Turnix melanogaster) is also listed as critically endangered, due to 90% of its habitat being cleared since European settlement and the remainder of its rainforest habitat being highly fragmented. The rufous scrub-bird (Atrichornis rufescens) is a threatened bird on the TSC Act. This medium size (about 17 cm body size) ground-dwelling bird that relies on dense ground vegetation for nesting. Another threatened species is the white-eared monarch (Carterornis leucotis), a small bird which relies on insects for the majority of its diet and nests high in the canopy near the rainforest edges. The marbled frogmouth (Podargus ocellatus), related to the nightjars family, is a threatened bird listed on the TSC Act. It prefers rainforest creeks with Bangalow palms or ferns. Several fruit-doves are listed as threatened on the TSC Act, including the superb fruit-dove (Ptilinopus superbus), the rose-crowned fruit-dove (Ptilinopus Regina) and the wompoo fruit-dove (Ptilinopus magnificus). The park contains the largest known population of the threatened Albert's lyrebird (Menura alberti), which is listed on the TSC Act. There has been a single sighting of the regent honeyeater (Anthochaera Phrygia) at the park. Due to loss of habitat it is listed as critically endangered on the TSC Act and endangered on the EPBC Act. The black and yellow bird with a wing span of 30 cm has been for the last two decades the focus of a national conservation effort to save the species from extinction.

=== Frogs ===
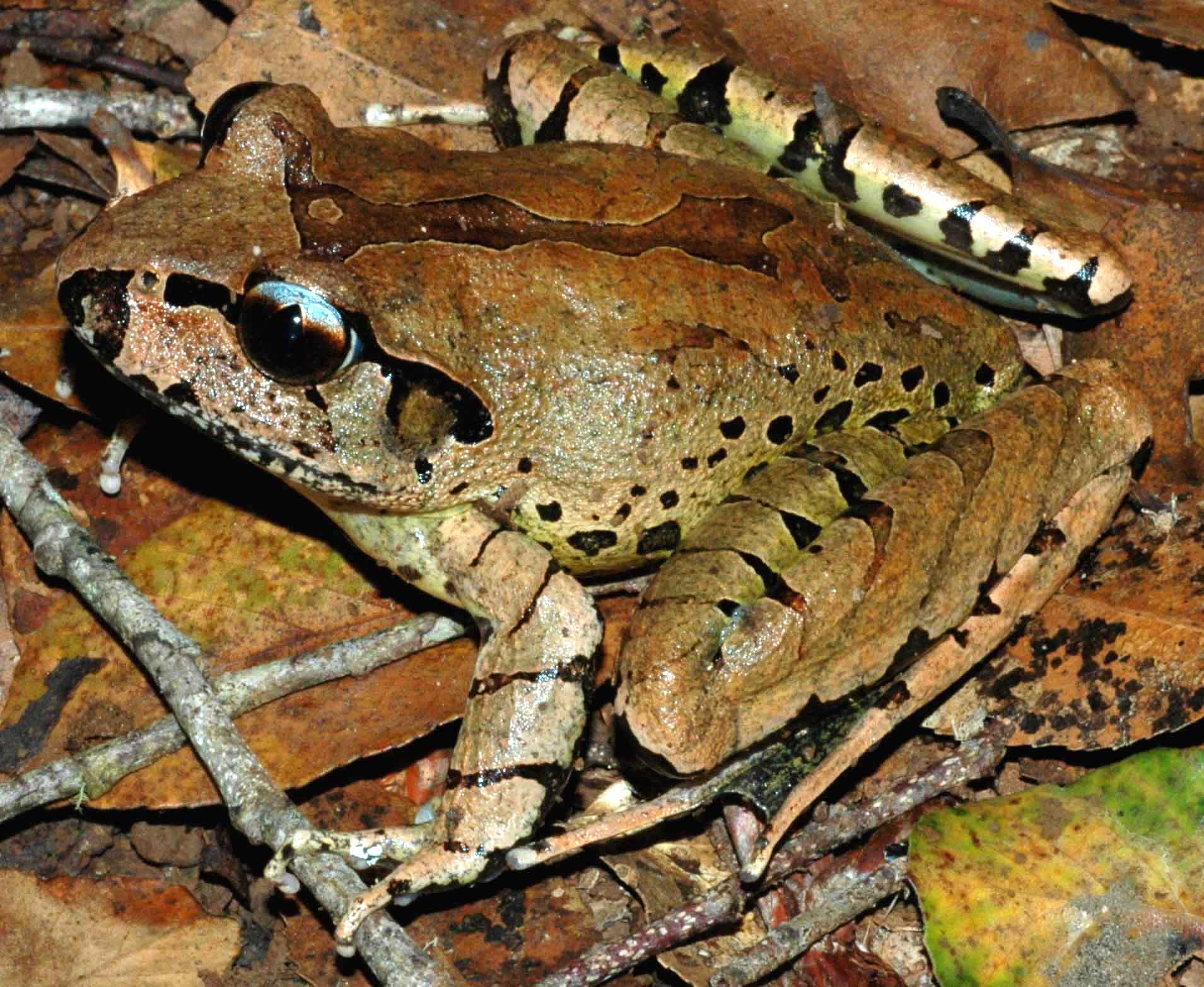
Fleay's barred frog (Mixophyes fleayi)

Two frog species are classified as endangered on the EPBC Act. One is the Fleay's barred frog (Mixophyes fleayi), a large frog of 90mm that relies on small streams in rainforest habitat. The other is the giant barred frog (Mixophyes iteratus), a large frog up to 108mm with a powerful build. There is an endangered species listed under the TSC Act called Loveridge's frog (Philoria loveridgei), a small ground-dwelling frog of 30mm in size. The pouched frog (Assa darlingtoni) and green-thighed frog (Litoria brevipalmata) are both listed as vulnerable under the TSC Act. All of these frogs are mainly threatened by the chytrid fungus.

=== Reptiles ===
Two species of reptiles are listed as vulnerable on the TSC Act. The Stephens' banded snake (Hoplocephalus stephensii) is a one metre long tree-dwelling snake that hunts at night. The three-toed snake-tooth skink (Coeranoscincus reticulatus) is a borrowing lizard that has a body length of 23 cm and is also listed as vulnerable under the EPBC Act.

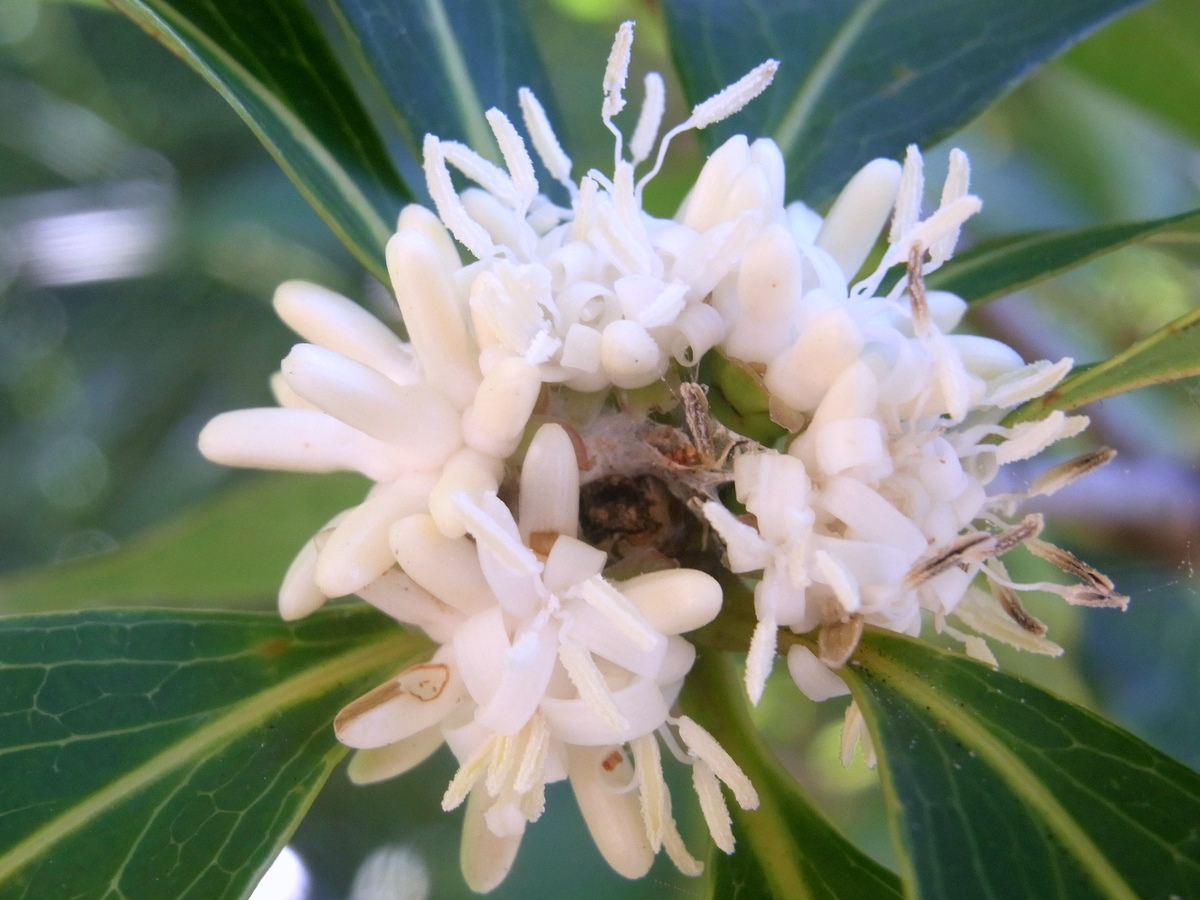
Nightcap oak (Eidothea hardeniana) flowering

=== Trees ===
The Nightcap oak (Eidothea hardeniana) is listed as critically endangered under the EPBC Act. It was discovered in 2000 and has a locally restricted single population on the southern side of the Nightcap Range. 15–20 million years old fossil fruits found near Ballarat, Victoria suggest that the genus Eidothea and rainforest were historically widespread. There are also several endangered species of trees on the EPBC Act, including the southern ochrosia (Ochrosia moorei) with a range from the Gold Coast to Coffs Harbour. The Minyon quandong (Elaeocarpus sedentarius) was thought to be extinct until 1992, and is found in only three nature reserves: Nightcap NP, Jerusalem NP and Whian Whian SCA. The peach myrtle (Uromyrtus australis) has a similar range to the Minyon Quandong.

=== Other flora ===
The following species are all listed as Endangered under the TSC Act: Coast Euodia (Melicope vitiflora), Amyema plicatula, short-footed screw fern (Lindsaea brachypoda), green-leaved rose walnut (Endiandra muelleri subsp. bracteata), narrow-leaf finger fern (Grammitis stenophylla) and tree guinea flower (Hibbertia hexandra). The majority of these are listed because of their restricted range, and are threatened by habitat clearing, fragmentation, fire, and local extinction due to small populations and illegal collection.

== Environmental threats ==
=== Pest animals ===
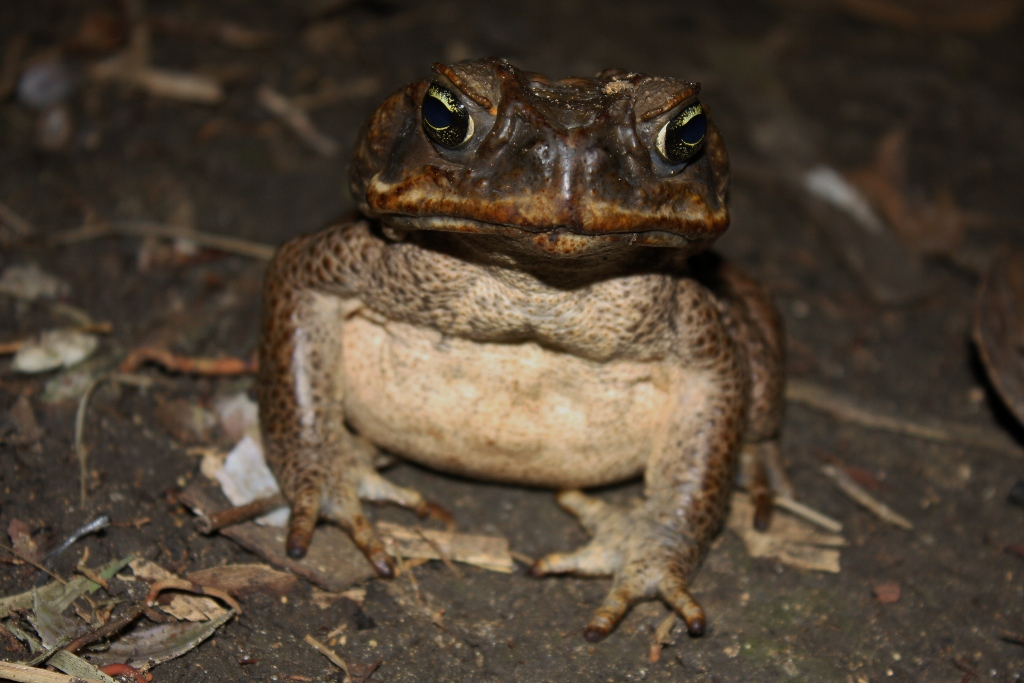
Cane toad (Bufo marinus)

Wild dogs (Canis spp.), feral cats (Felis catus) and red foxes (Vulpes vulpes) are all predatory threats to native animals that live at the park, especially small mammals and ground-nesting birds and their eggs. These introduced predatory species can also outcompete native predators like the endangered spotted-tailed quoll. Black rats (Rattus rattus) are opportunistic feeders, eating both vegetation and animals such as large insects, lizards, birds and eggs. While rats have more of an impact on islands they still pose a threat to mainland habitats. By 2010 cane toads (Bufo marinus) started appearing around the outside region of the park but in lower numbers than at the nearby Borders Ranges NP. The cane toad is highly poisonous at every stage of its life, from egg to fully grown, and any animal that tries to eat it would likely die. Cane toads also prey upon and outcompete native endangered frogs for vital spawning habitats.

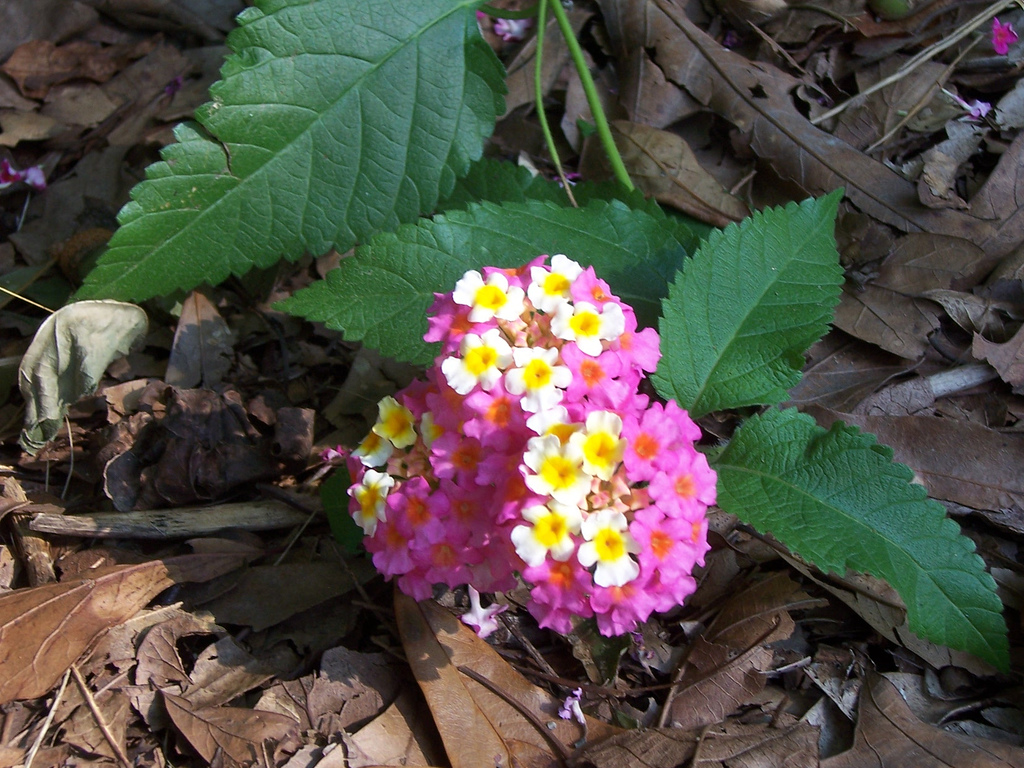
Lantana (Lantana camara)

=== Weeds ===
Lantana (Lantana camara) is a weed of national significant that threatens the park, other weeds that are a significant threat include whiskey grass (Andropogon virginicus), crofton weed (Ageratina adenophora) and mistflower (Ageratina riparia). Weeds that are becoming a concern at the park include camphor laurel (Cinnamomum camphora), devil's fig (Solanum torvum) and Parramatta grass (Sporobolus africanus).

=== Fire ===
Fire is not a requirement for rainforest species to germinate or to reproduce. If a fire did occur it would change habitat conditions and have an adverse impact on threatened rainforest species like the Nightcap oak. A suspicious fire occurred in September 2014 near Minyon Falls Road at the park. Fortunately no one was harmed and it only burned dry sclerophyll forest. The park was devastated by the 2019-2020 Australian brushfire season, raising grave fears about the fate of its inhabitants. However, many of the burned nightcap oak trees managed to regenerate after the fires, with only less than a fifth dying, and some of the inhabitants such as red-legged pademelon and long-nosed potoroo were shown to not be significantly affected, although others such as the golden-tipped bat were likely negatively affected.

=== Phytophthora cinnamomi ===
Phytophthora cinnamomi is a microscopic soil-borne pathogen (a fungus), that causes root rot of plants and may eventually lead to the death of the plant. It has now spread across much of Australia primarily in areas of rainfall above 600mm and south of latitude 30°. On the EPBC Act the disease caused by this pathogen is listed as a key threatening process and has the potential to impact the Nightcap oak.

=== Chytridiomycosis ===
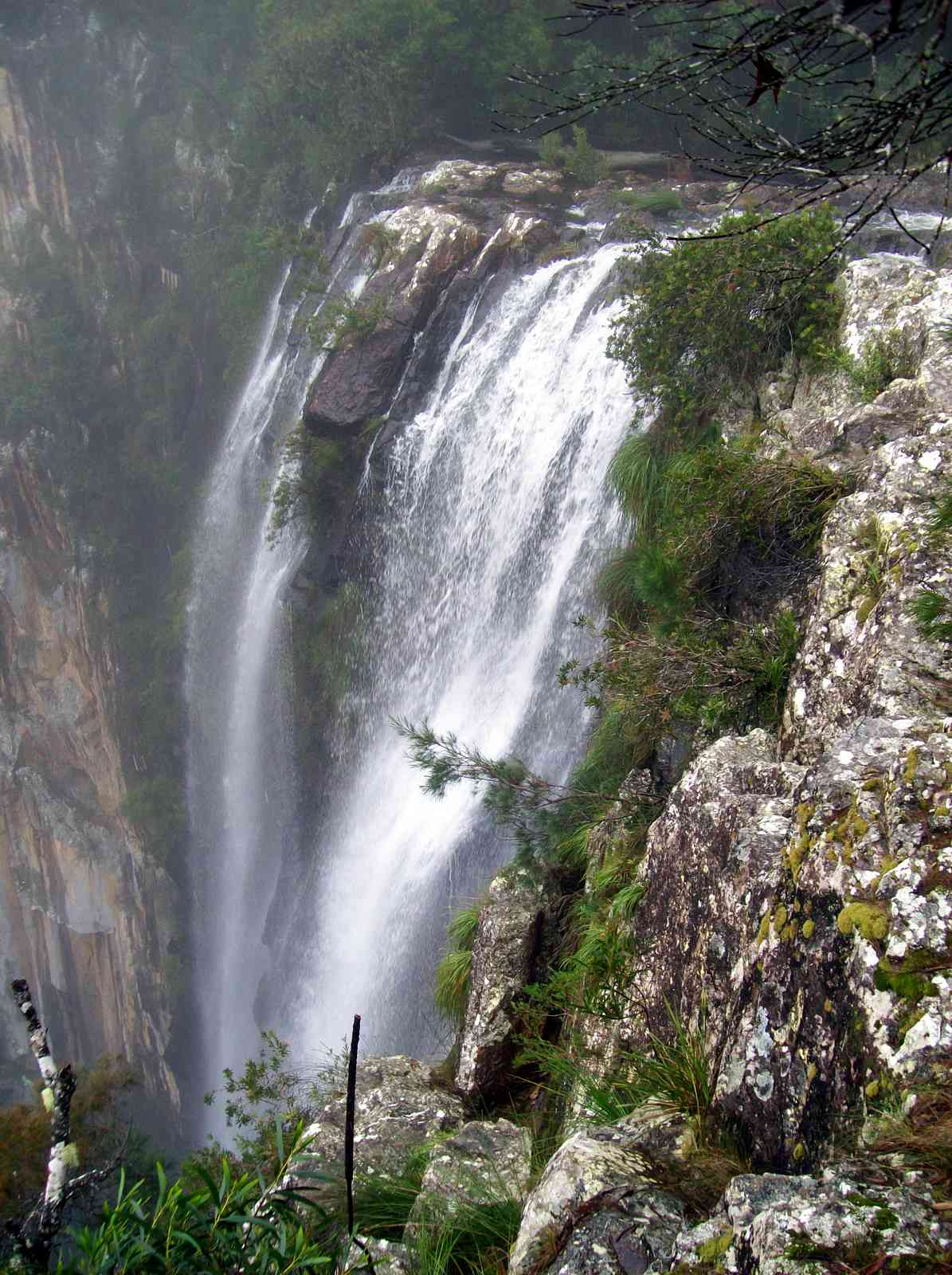
Minyon Falls in the Nightcap National Park

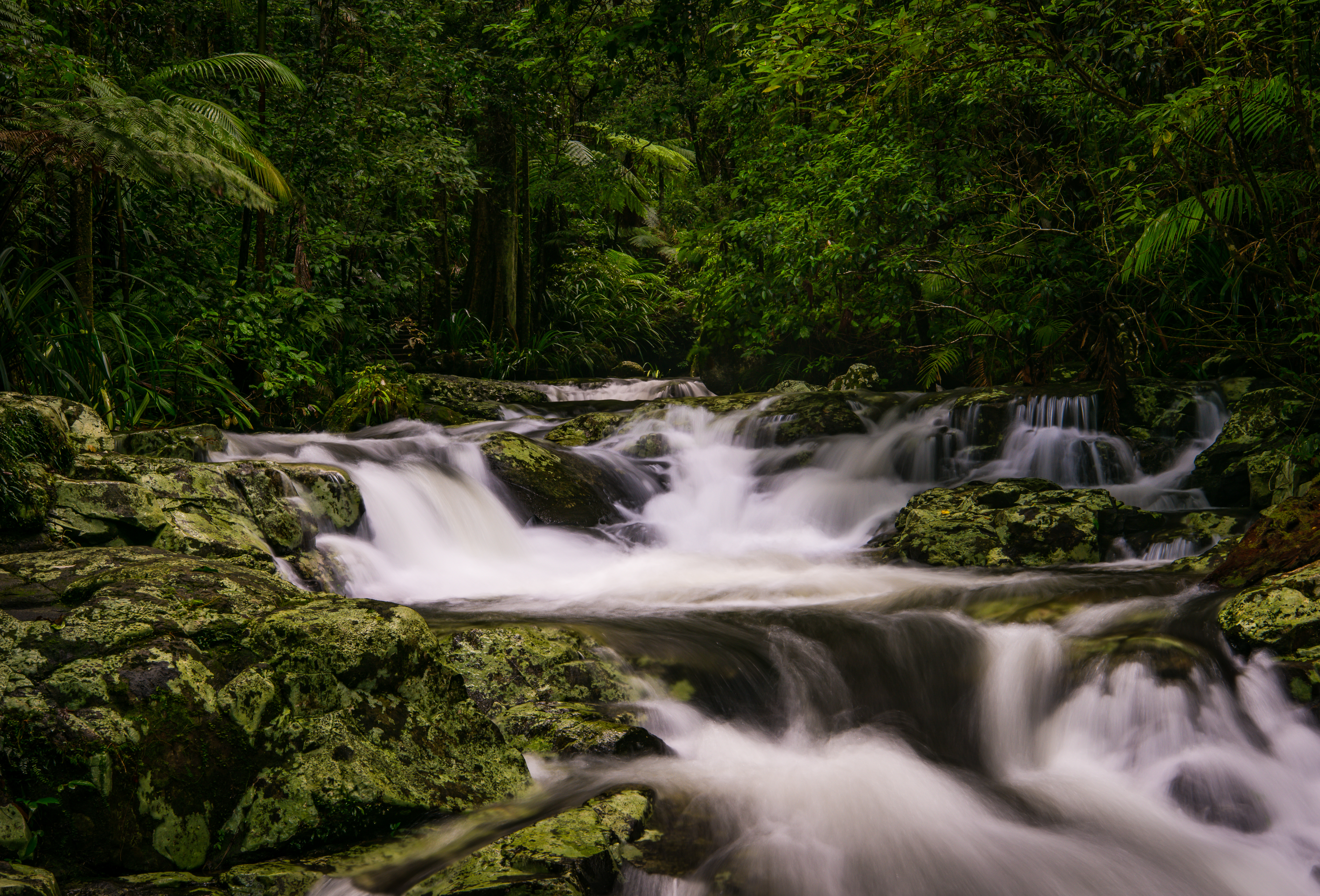
Terania Rapids

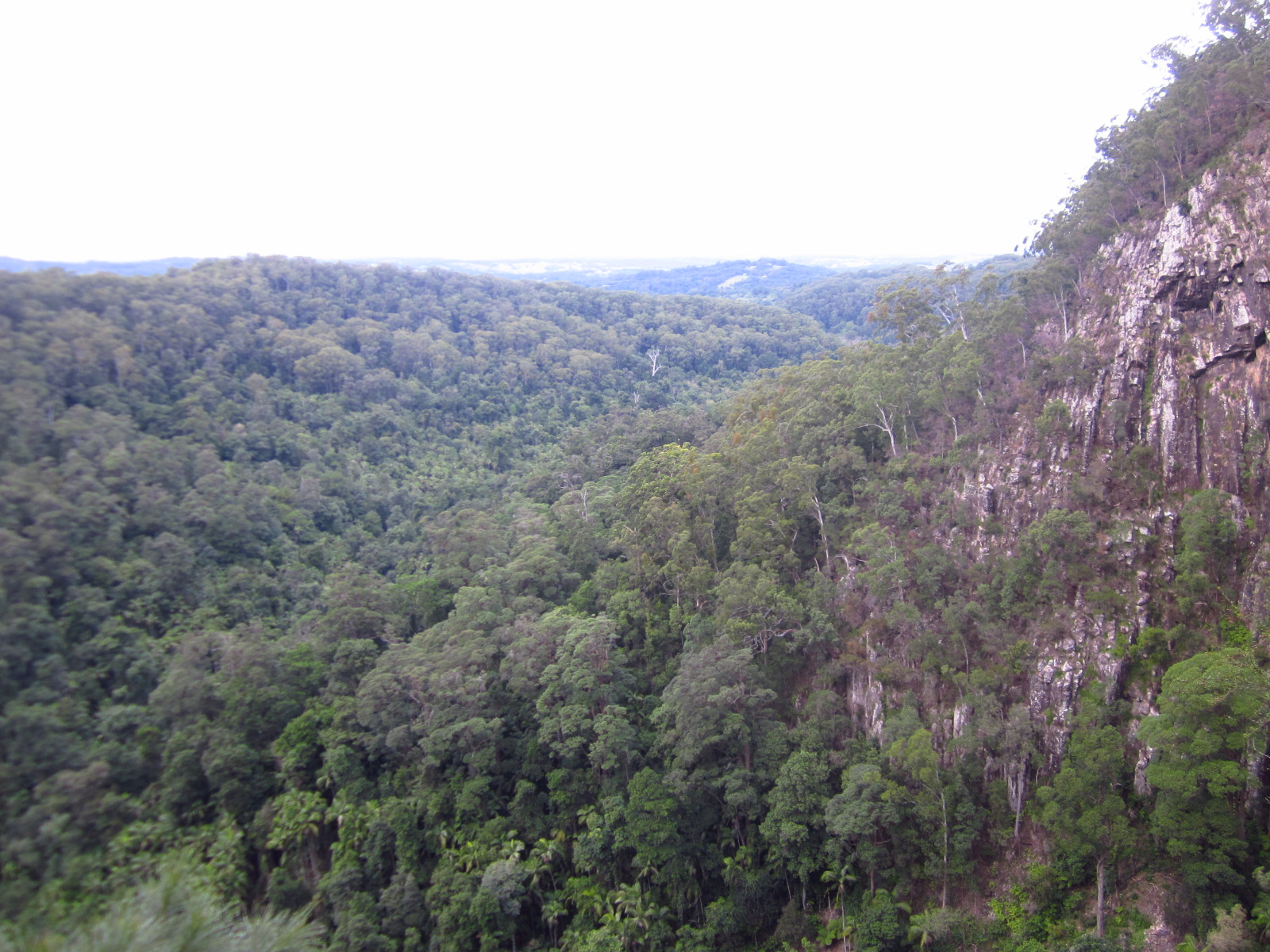
View at Minyon Falls

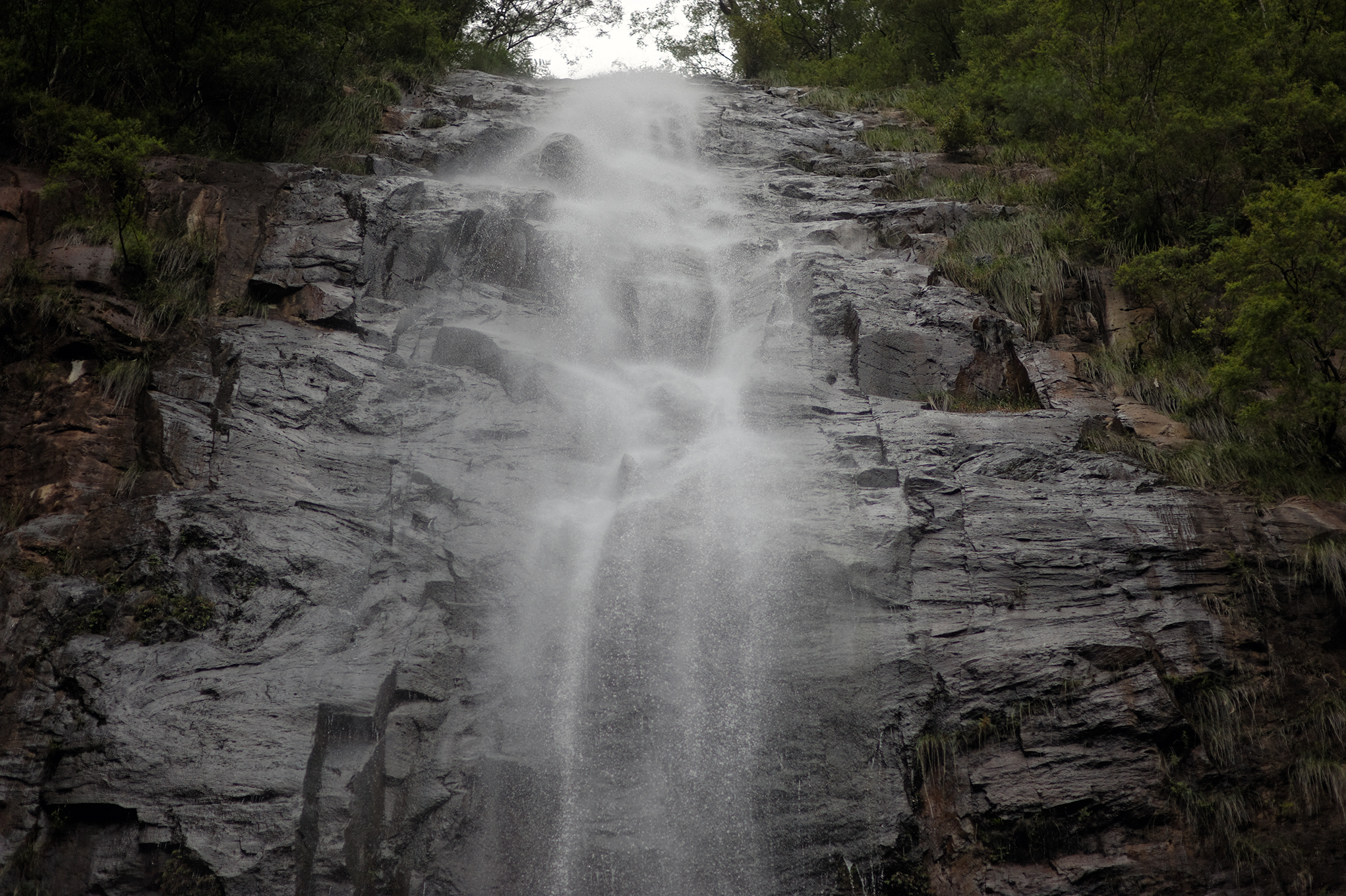
Protesters Falls in the Nightcap National Park

Chytridiomycosis, caused by the chytrid fungus, is the world's worst disease affecting vertebrates. In Australia it is thought that the disease led to the extinction of four frog species and is threatening the survival of at least ten more frog species. Fifty species of frogs in Australia have been identified as being infected with the chytrid fungus. The disease has been found throughout Gondwana Rainforests of Australia World Heritage area of the Northern-Rivers NSW. The disease has been found in individuals of the giant barred frog and is a key threatening process to the endangered frog. Other frogs at the park are also threatened by the disease including the Fleay's barred frog and Loveridge's frog.

== Management ==
The management plan for Nightcap NP is the Parks & Reserves of the Tweed Caldera Plan of Management created by the NSW National Parks and Wildlife Service. The main objectives are as follows:

Maintain ecosystems or, if needed, rehabilitate areas in the park in accordance to the principles of the World Heritage convention and to assess the extension of Nightcap NP as potential addition to the Gondwana Rainforests of Australia World Heritage area. Promote and provide information on World Heritage Gondwana Rainforests of Australia, by signage and brochures.

Conserve the full range of native plants and animals including habitats at the park. Neighbouring land with habitat is managed via cooperative agreements. Support neighbouring landholders to protect and manage adjoining ecological corridors. Ensure that no swimming occurs downstream of Protesters Falls at the park, so that high water quality remains for the threatened Fleays barred frog.

Control and when possible eradicate weeds and replace with locally native species that would occur in the way of natural regeneration. In the park control the dispersal of the introduced Queensland maple (Flindersia brayleyana), a tree that is grown for its timber. Control pest species (wild dog, red fox, feral cat, black rat, cane toad and invertebrate pests) in line with the Pest Management Strategy for the Northern Rivers Region of NPWS.

Prevent fire from affecting rainforest and wet sclerophyll forest and manage the correct intensity, frequency and patchiness of fire in other vegetation communities, to ensure ecological succession occurs. Complete and implement the Fire Management Strategies for Nightcap NP.

== Access ==
The park has three main sections. Access to the Mount Nardi section, including Tuntable Falls and the Pholis Walk to Pholis Gap, is via sealed road from Nimbin. The park contains Old Googarna walking track past Mount Neville, and the Historic Nightcap Track from Doon Doon south through the Whian Whian SCA to Dorroughby or east to Huonbrook and Mullumbimby. From Dunoon via The Channon along Terania Creek Road vehicle access is possible to the Terania Creek Basin and a walk to Protesters Falls. Terania was the site of one of the biggest conservation battles of the late 1970s. Also in the Whian Whian SCA, Minyon Falls is a 100-metre (330 ft) waterfall which rises from a subtropical rainforest valley. It has some popular walking tracks and a road-accessible lookout and picnic area.

== See also ==
- Protected areas of New South Wales
- High Conservation Value Old Growth forest
