= Bexhill =

Bexhill may refer to:

- Bexhill-on-Sea, East Sussex, England
- Bexhill, New South Wales, Australia
- Bexhill, Saskatchewan, Canada
