= Blue Knob, New South Wales =

Blue Knob New South Wales
- Coordinates: 28°32′54″S 153°11′4″E
- Population: 210 (2021 census)
- Time zone: AEST (UTC+10)
  - Summer (DST): AEDT (UTC+11)
- LGA(s): City of Lismore
- Region: Northern Rivers
- State electorate(s): Lismore
- Federal division(s): Page

Blue Knob is a locality in the Northern Rivers region of New South Wales, Australia which sits within the City of Lismore local government area. It is approximately 37 kilometres (23 mi) from the regional centre of Lismore and 6 kilometres (3.7 mi) to the nearest town of Nimbin.

The traditional owners of this area are the Widjabul people of the Bundjalung nation.

It is nearby to Lillian Rock, next to Blue Knob Mountain, which is a sacred landmark to the Bundjalung people.

In 2021 census, Blue Knob had a population of 210 people.
