= Blakebrook, New South Wales =

Blakebrook New South Wales
- Coordinates: 28°45′54″S 153°15′4″E
- Population: 132 (2021 census)
- Time zone: AEST (UTC+10)
  - Summer (DST): AEDT (UTC+11)
- LGA(s): City of Lismore
- Region: Northern Rivers
- State electorate(s): Lismore
- Federal division(s): Page

Blakebrook (Bandjalang: Ngumbandunman) is a locality in the Northern Rivers region of New South Wales, Australia. The town is 3.54 kilometers (2.20 miles) from Lismore and sits within the City of Lismore local government area.

The Widjabul people, of the Bundjalung nation, are the traditional owners of this area. The Bundjalung language name for this place is Ngumbandunman which is a combination of the words ngumban (blanket) and dunman (split, torn, tattered).

In 2021 census, Blakebrook had a population of 132 people.
