= Lismore Heights, New South Wales =

Lismore Heights Lismore, New South Wales
- Coordinates: 28°48′16″S 153°18′0″E
- Population: 2,117 (2021 census)
- Time zone: AEST (UTC+10)
  - Summer (DST): AEDT (UTC+11)
- LGA(s): City of Lismore
- Region: Northern Rivers
- State electorate(s): Lismore
- Federal division(s): Page

Lismore Heights is a locality in the Northern Rivers region of New South Wales, Australia. In 2021 census, Lismore Heights had a population of 2,117 people reflecting a decrease of 76 from the 2,193 counted in the 2016 census.
