= Repentance Creek, New South Wales =

Repentance Creek Guhnyin or Coonyun (Bandjalang)
- Town
- Coordinates: 28°37′54″S 153°24′4″E
- Country: Australia
- State: New South Wales
- LGA: City of Lismore

Government
  - State electorate: Lismore
  - Federal division: Page

Population
  - Total: 104 (2016 census)
- Postcode: 2480

Repentance Creek is a locality located in the Northern Rivers Region of New South Wales and it is located in the Lismore City Council local government area and is approximately 28.5 kilometres (17.7 mi) from the regional centre of Lismore.

It is on the lands of the Widjabal people of the Bundjalung nation who are its traditional owners.

== History and origin of place name ==
One of the first Europeans to explore this creek was Dan Withers, a 'cedar-getter' and teamster, who was involved in the forestry industry and primarily based at a logging camp in Bexhill and it was then known to Europeans as Boggy Creek. He recorded to Bundjalung language name of the creek as being coonyun which he was told meant 'good-fellow'. Linguist Margaret Sharpe believed this is a misspelling of the word guhnyin which means friend.

The origin of the European name are less clear with numerous stories involving repentance, all in relation to logging, which relate to either regret about financial loss or theft. The name came to use around 1873 when it began being used regularly, replacing the earlier European name, and, in 1928 the Northern Star stated "[t]he scenery is beautiful, even if the name seems inappropriate".
