= Terania Creek, New South Wales =

Terania Creek New South Wales
- Coordinates: 28°36′54.2″S 153°18′3.9″E
- Population: 207 (2021 census)
- Time zone: AEST (UTC+10)
  - Summer (DST): AEDT (UTC+11)
- LGA(s): City of Lismore
- Region: Northern Rivers
- State electorate(s): Lismore
- Federal division(s): Page

Terania Creek is a locality in the Northern Rivers region of New South Wales, Australia. It sits within the City of Lismore local government area and is located 29.7 kilometres (18.5 mi) north of Lismore. In the 2021 census it had a population of 207 people.

The traditional owners are the Widjabul and Wia-bal people of the Bundjalung Nation.

The first rainforest anti-logging demonstrations in Australia occurred at a site in Terania Creek, which is now included in the Nightcap National Park.
