= Tuckurimba, New South Wales =

Tuckurimba New South Wales
- Coordinates: 28°56′54.2″S 153°19′3.9″E
- Population: 112 (2021 census)
- Time zone: AEST (UTC+10)
  - Summer (DST): AEDT (UTC+11)
- LGA(s): City of Lismore
- Region: Northern Rivers
- State electorate(s): Lismore
- Federal division(s): Page

Tuckurimba (tuck-a-RIM-ba) is a locality in the Northern Rivers region of New South Wales, Australia. It sits within the City of Lismore local government area and is located 20 kilometres (12 mi) south of Lismore. In the 2021 census it had a population of 112 people.

The traditional owners are the Widjabul and Wia-bal people of the Bundjalung Nation.

== Origin of place name ==
The name Tuckurimba is taken from the Bundjalung language words; likely Dugarimbah, Doogarimbah or Dugirinba for which different differing definitions have been given including: glutton, a large species or lizard, the junction of two creeks or a collection of huts.
