= Jiggi, New South Wales =

Jiggi New South Wales
- Coordinates: 28°40′54″S 153°11′4″E
- Population: 370 (2021 census)
- Time zone: AEST (UTC+10)
  - Summer (DST): AEDT (UTC+11)
- LGA(s): City of Lismore
- Region: Northern Rivers
- State electorate(s): Lismore
- Federal division(s): Page

Jiggi is a locality in the Northern Rivers region of New South Wales, Australia. It sits within the City of Lismore local government area and is located 22.7 kilometres (14.1 mi) north of Lismore. In the 2021 census it had a population of 370 people.

The Traditional owners are the Widjabul and Wia-bal people of the Bundjalung Nation.

== Origin of place name ==
The name Jiggi is derived from the Wiyabal dialect of the Yugambeh–Bundjalung languages word for either 'reeds which grow near swamps' or from the word jigay meaning 'cat bird' or juguary meaning 'cry of the cat bird'. This is also considered the Aboriginal place name for Jiggi.
