= Ruthven, New South Wales =

Ruthven New South Wales
- Coordinates: 28°55′54.2″S 153°17′3.9″E
- Population: 114 (2021 census)
- Time zone: AEST (UTC+10)
  - Summer (DST): AEDT (UTC+11)
- LGA(s): City of Lismore
- Region: Northern Rivers
- State electorate(s): Lismore
- Federal division(s): Page

Ruthven is a locality in the Northern Rivers region of New South Wales, Australia. It sits within the City of Lismore local government area and is located 16.3 kilometres (10.1 mi) south of Lismore. In the 2021 census it had a population of 114 people.

The traditional owners are the Widjabul and Wia-bal people of the Bundjalung Nation.

== Origin of place name ==
The European name for this place was given to it by Alex McDonald after Ruthven in Scotland where his family had come from.
