= Numulgi, New South Wales =

Numulgi New South Wales
- Coordinates: 28°44′54.2″S 153°20′3.9″E
- Population: 207 (2021 census)
- Time zone: AEST (UTC+10)
  - Summer (DST): AEDT (UTC+11)
- LGA(s): City of Lismore
- Region: Northern Rivers
- State electorate(s): Lismore
- Federal division(s): Page

Numulgi (new-MUL-ghai) is a locality in the Northern Rivers region of New South Wales, Australia. It sits within the City of Lismore local government area and is located 16 kilometres (9.9 mi) north of Lismore. In the 2021 census it had a population of 207 people.

The traditional owners are the Widjabul and Wia-bal people of the Bundjalung Nation.

== Origin of place name ==
The name Numulgi is taken from the Bundjalung language word ngamahl which either means goanna or wild or scrub turkey.
