= Keerrong, New South Wales =

Keerong New South Wales
- Coordinates: 28°42′54.2″S 153°16′3.9″E
- Population: 155 (2021 census)
- Time zone: AEST (UTC+10)
  - Summer (DST): AEDT (UTC+11)
- LGA(s): City of Lismore
- Region: Northern Rivers
- State electorate(s): Lismore
- Federal division(s): Page

Keerrong (KEER-rong) is a locality in the Northern Rivers region of New South Wales, Australia. It sits within the City of Lismore local government area and is located 18.3 kilometres (11.4 mi) north of Lismore. In the 2021 census it had a population of 155 people.

The Traditional owners are the Widjabul and Wia-bal people of the Bundjalung Nation.

== Origin of place name ==
This area was first known to European settlers in the area as Fox Ground but, in 1897, it was changed to Keerrong. This name is believed to have being derived from the Bundjalung language word for flying fox.
