= Tucki Tucki, New South Wales =

Tucki Tucki New South Wales
- Coordinates: 28°55′45″S 153°18′50″E
- Population: 167 (2016 census)
- Postcode(s): 2480
- LGA(s): City of Lismore
- State electorate(s): Ballina
- Federal division(s): Page

Tucki Tucki is a locality in the Northern Rivers Region of New South Wales, Australia.

== See also ==
- List of reduplicated Australian place names
