= Fernside, New South Wales =

Fernside New South Wales
- Coordinates: 28°46′54.2″S 153°10′3.9″E
- Population: 55 (2021 census)
- Time zone: AEST (UTC+10)
  - Summer (DST): AEDT (UTC+11)
- LGA(s): City of Lismore
- Region: Northern Rivers
- State electorate(s): Lismore
- Federal division(s): Page

Fernside is a locality in the Northern Rivers region of New South Wales, Australia. It sits within the City of Lismore local government area and is located 12.5 kilometres (7.8 mi) west of Lismore. In the 2021 census it had a population of 55 people.

The Traditional owners are the Widjabul and Wia-bal people of the Bundjalung Nation.
