= Dungarubba, New South Wales =

Dungarubba New South Wales
- Coordinates: 28°59′54.2″S 153°23′3.9″E
- Population: 52 (2021 census)
- Time zone: AEST (UTC+10)
  - Summer (DST): AEDT (UTC+11)
- LGA(s): City of Lismore
- Region: Northern Rivers
- State electorate(s): Lismore
- Federal division(s): Page

Dungarubba (dung-ga-ROO-ba) is a locality in the Northern Rivers region of New South Wales, Australia. It sits within the City of Lismore local government area and is located 29.4 kilometres (18.3 mi) south of Lismore and 12.3 kilometres (7.6 mi) east of Coraki. In the 2021 census it had a population of 52 people.

The traditional owners are the Widjabul and Wia-bal people of the Bundjalung Nation.

== Origin of place name ==
Dungarubba was once also known by the names Dingarubba and Unkaruba and these place names appear to be derived from the Bundjalung language word dehnga which is said to mean 'flat, swampy country' or a paperbark tree which grows in that sort of environment.
