= Tullera, New South Wales =

Tullera
- Town
- Coordinates: 28°45′54.2″S 153°18′3.9″E
- Country: Australia
- State: New South Wales
- Region: Northern Rivers
- LGA: City of Lismore

Government
  - State electorate: Lismore
  - Federal division: Page

Population
  - Total: 271 (2021 census)
- Time zone: UTC+10 (AEST)
  - Summer (DST): UTC+11 (AEDT)

Tullera (TULL-era) is a locality in the Northern Rivers region of New South Wales, Australia. It sits within the City of Lismore local government area and is located 10 kilometres (6.2 mi) north of Lismore. In the 2021 census it had a population of 271 people.

The traditional owners are the Widjabul and Wia-bal people of the Bundjalung Nation.

== Origin of place name ==
The name Tullera is derived either from the Bundjalung language word tchollera which is said to be the name of a local bird species or djulur which means scorpion.
