= Coffee Camp, New South Wales =

Coffee Camp New South Wales
- Coordinates: 28°39′54.2″S 153°13′3.9″E
- Population: 201 (2021 census)
- Time zone: AEST (UTC+10)
  - Summer (DST): AEDT (UTC+11)
- LGA(s): City of Lismore
- Region: Northern Rivers
- State electorate(s): Lismore
- Federal division(s): Page

Coffee Camp is a locality in the Northern Rivers region of New South Wales, Australia. It sits within the City of Lismore local government area and is located 22.8 kilometres (14.2 mi) north of Lismore. In the 2021 census it had a population of 201 people.

The Traditional owners are the Widjabul and Wia-bal people of the Bundjalung Nation.
