= Larnook, New South Wales =

Larnook
- Town
- Coordinates: 28°38′54.2″S 153°07′3.9″E
- Country: Australia
- State: New South Wales
- Region: Northern Rivers
- LGA: City of Lismore

Government
  - State electorate: Lismore
  - Federal division: Page

Population
  - Total: 394 (2021 census)
- Time zone: UTC+10 (AEST)
  - Summer (DST): UTC+11 (AEDT)

Larnook is a locality in the Northern Rivers region of New South Wales, Australia. It sits within the City of Lismore local government area and is located 29 kilometres (18 mi) north of Lismore. In the 2021 census it had a population of 394 people.

The Traditional owners are the Widjabul and Wia-bal people of the Bundjalung Nation.

== Origin of place name ==
The European name for Larnook was given by an early land selector there named WM Seacombe who named it after a property in Wollongbar, New South Wales.\
