= James Joseph Malone =

Australian engineer

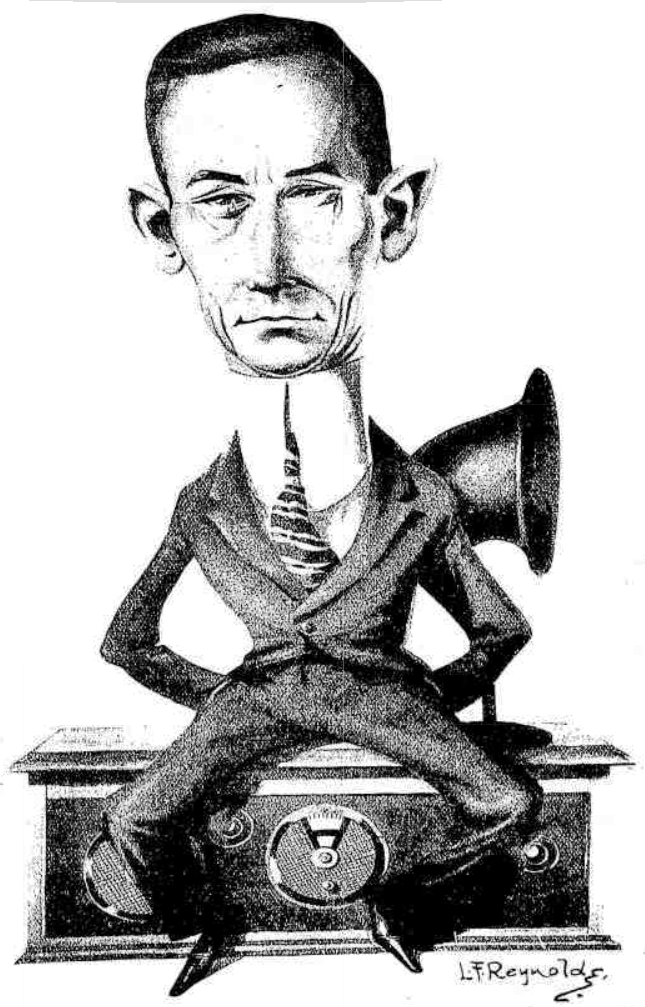
- 1926 caricature by Reynolds
- Born: 1883; South Gundarimba, near Lismore, New South Wales, Australia
- Occupation: Engineer
- Known for: Controller of Wireless, Postmaster-General's Department; Head of Overseas Telecommunications Commission
- Awards: Military Cross, Order of the British Empire

James Joseph Malone MC (born 1883) was an Australian engineer prominent in the fields of telegraphy, wireless, broadcasting and communications. During the 1920s and 1930s he was Controller of Wireless with the then Postmaster-General's Department. He was later head of the Overseas Telecommunications Commission in the 1940s.

== Early and family life ==
James Joseph Malone was born on 24 August 1883 in South Gundarimba, near Lismore, New South Wales, and raised in the nearby small village of Gundurimba. His parents were Peter Malone and Eliza Malone née Clancy. On leaving school he entered the service of the Postmaster-General as a telegraph messenger in the Lismore Post Office, and subsequently became a telegraphist.

== Military career ==
Malone enlisted in the Australian Imperial Force (AIF) in August 1916, and was attached to the Australian Flying Corps as a private. In France he was mainly engaged on wireless and signal work in the Flying Corps as a radio-engineer, and at the conclusion of hostilities he held the rank of lieutenant. His duties at the front enabled him to gain valuable experience in wireless and signal work, and at the conclusion of hostilities he continued his investigations into the great advances made in wireless and allied technical work. He was also engaged in connection with the education scheme of the AIF under which the soldiers awaiting embarkation were given an opportunity to acquire knowledge. In England, France and Germany he made a close study of the latest practices in connection with telegraph and telephone problems, and later on obtained his discharge from the AIF in England in order to visit the United States and New Zealand to investigate these subjects there on behalf of the Postmaster-General. Lieutenant Malone received the Military Cross for gallantry, being one of only two soldiers from Gundurimba to have won that distinction.

== Recognition ==
In 1955 he was invested as Officer in the Order of the British Empire for services to broadcasting.
