= Dunoon, New South Wales =

Dunoon New South Wales
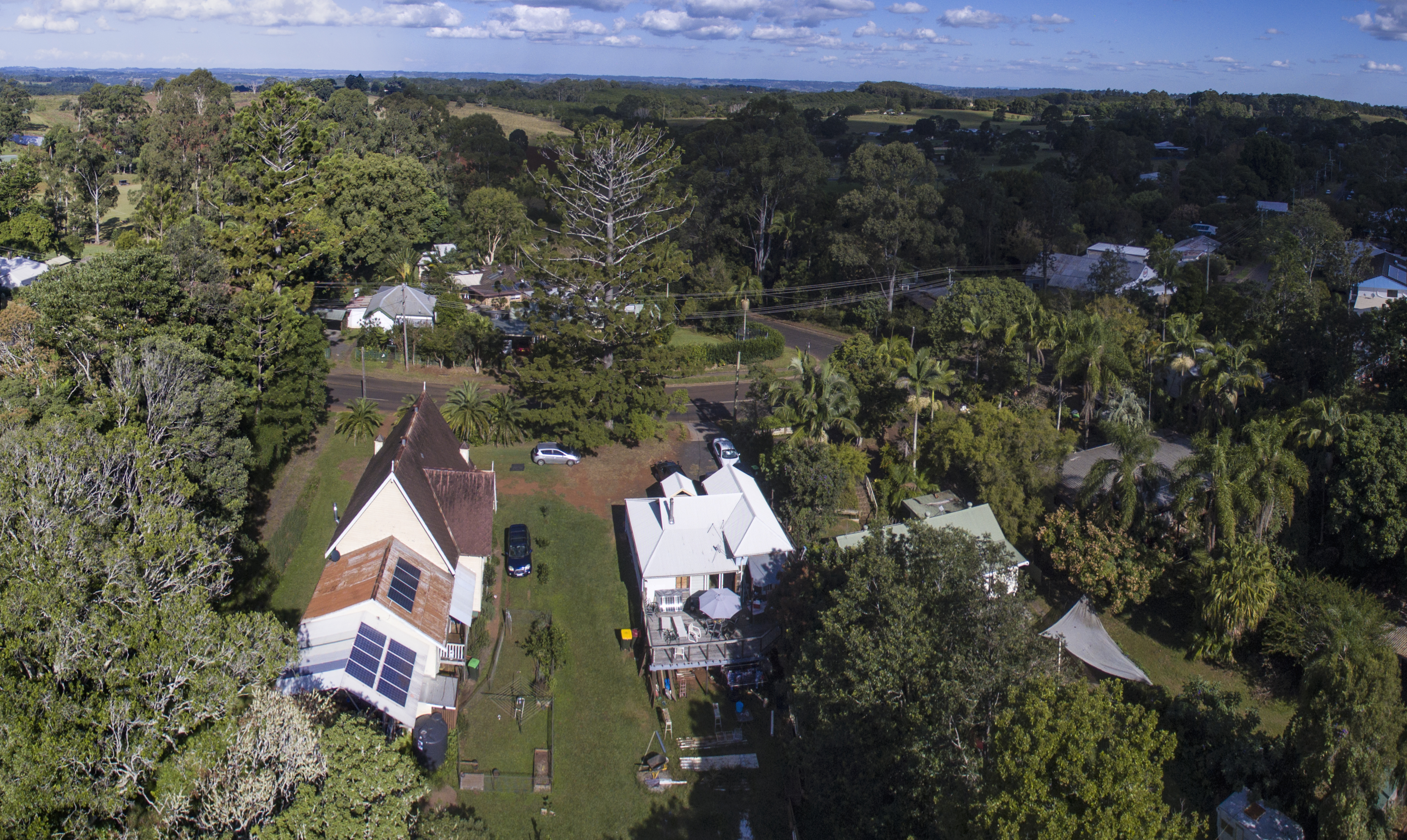
- Dunoon in May 2016

- Coordinates: 28°41′S 153°19′E
- Population: 824 (2011 census); 372 (2006 census)
- LGA(s): City of Lismore
- Region: Northern Rivers
- State electorate(s): Lismore
- Federal division(s): Page

Dunoon is a small village within the City of Lismore local government area in the Northern Rivers region of New South Wales, Australia. It is 17 kilometres (11 mi) from the regional centre of Lismore and 6 kilometres (3.7 mi) from the nearby village The Channon.

The traditional owners of this area are the Wiyabal people of the Bundjalung nation.

It is self-proclaimed as the Macadamia capital of Australia and has a macadamia processing plant on its outskirts.

The village's local newspaper is The Dunoon and District Gazette, with past copies available at the Richmond Tweed Regional Library and the Richmond River Historical Society.

== Origin of place name ==
It has been suggested that the origin of the place name of Dunoon is the Bundjalung language word 'Dirahny, which means jumping ant. It is, however, more likely that it is named for the village of the same name in Scotland especially as two as the early European settlers, Duncan and Archibald Currie were born there.

== History ==
The Dunoon area, is larger than what is now considered Dunoon, and one of its first developed sections Modanville was originally known as Dunoon. What is now known as Dunoon was first settled by Europeans by timber getters and then by pastoralists, mostly dairy farmers, in the 1880s (many of whom were a part of the Norco Co-operative).

The village itself took time to develop with it forming around the post office which was built there is 1904 and 15 allotment being created and then auctioned in 1905 and after this it continued to grow.

The first major change to industry in the area came in the 1970s when many of the dairy farms were converted into fruit and nut farms which, by the 1980s was dominated by Macadamia nuts. Many of the properties these farms started on had already been abandoned and were mostly taken over by those looking for a new way of life; outside of the cities. These nuts remain the primary industry of the region.

== Population ==
At the 2006 census, Dunoon had a population of 372 people and, in the 2011 census, the population was 824.

== Development ==
Dunoon is currently predominantly a unilinear development, but a major land release has expanded off the main ridge. Community concerns over the social impact on the town of a second development were allayed in February 2009 when developers withdrew their application to develop a new subdivision from Lismore City Council.

Rous County Council, which is the authority responsible for the water supply for most of the Ballina, Byron, Lismore and Richmond Valley council areas, published its draft water strategy in June 2020, which includes a 50-gigalitre (1.8×10^{9} cu ft) dam at Dunoon. The council has been aware of Indigenous concerns since the matter was first considered in the 1990s, and was committed to working with local communities to mitigate concerns. An impact assessment of the site had identified various artefacts and burial sites in the area.
