= Buckendoon, New South Wales =

Buckendoon New South Wales
- Coordinates: 29°02′54.2″S 153°21′3.9″E
- Population: 48 (2021 census)
- Time zone: AEST (UTC+10)
  - Summer (DST): AEDT (UTC+11)
- LGA(s): City of Lismore
- Region: Northern Rivers
- State electorate(s): Lismore
- Federal division(s): Page

Buckendoon is a locality in the Northern Rivers region of New South Wales, Australia. It sits within the City of Lismore local government area and is located 29.6 kilometres (18.4 mi) south of Lismore and its nearest town is Coraki which is 10 kilometres (6.2 mi) north-west. In the 2021 census it had a population of 48 people.

The traditional owners of this area are the Gumbaynggirr people.
