= Koonorigan =

Village in New South Wales, Australia

- Coordinates: 28°39′54″S 153°15′4″E
- Country: Australia
- State: New South Wales
- City: Lismore
- LGA: Lismore

Government
  - State electorate: Lismore
  - Federal division: Page

Area
  - Total: 38.2 km^{2} (14.7 sq mi)

Population
  - Total: 269 (2011 census)
  - Density: 7.042/km^{2} (18.24/sq mi)
- Time zone: UTC+10
  - Summer (DST): UTC+11
- Postcode: 2480
- County: Rous
- Parish: Nimbin
Localities around Koonorigan
Coffee Camp
Jiggi	Koonorigan	The Channon, Tuntable Creek

Koonorigan (sometimes referred to as Konorigan) is a village in northeastern New South Wales, Australia in the City of Lismore local government area. It is 18.3 kilometres (11.4 mi) north of the regional centre of Lismore.

It is on the traditional lands of the Widjabul/Wia-bal people of the Bundjalung nation who are the traditional owners.

== Culture ==
Koonorigan has a community hall, dating from at least 1931.

== Notable people ==
- Bruce Duncan, member of the NSW Legislative Assembly 1965 to 1988
