= Corndale, New South Wales =

Corndale New South Wales
- Coordinates: 28°41′54.2″S 153°22′3.9″E
- Population: 358 (2021 census)
- Time zone: AEST (UTC+10)
  - Summer (DST): AEDT (UTC+11)
- LGA(s): City of Lismore
- Region: Northern Rivers
- State electorate(s): Lismore
- Federal division(s): Page

Corndale is a locality in the Northern Rivers region of New South Wales, Australia. It sits within the City of Lismore local government area and is located 18 kilometres (11 mi) north-east of Lismore. In the 2021 census it had a population of 358 people.

The Traditional owners are the Widjabul and Wia-bal people of the Bundjalung Nation.
