= Georgica, New South Wales =

Georgica New South Wales
- Coordinates: 28°38′54.2″S 153°11′3.9″E
- Population: 240 (2021 census)
- Time zone: AEST (UTC+10)
  - Summer (DST): AEDT (UTC+11)
- LGA(s): City of Lismore
- Region: Northern Rivers
- State electorate(s): Lismore
- Federal division(s): Page

Georgica is a locality in the Northern Rivers region of New South Wales, Australia. It sits within the City of Lismore local government area and is located 25.2 kilometres (15.7 mi) north of Lismore. In the 2021 census it had a population of 240 people.

The Traditional owners are the Widjabul and Wia-bal people of the Bundjalung Nation.

== Origin of place name ==
Georgica was given its European name around the time of the coronation of George V and is named in honour of him; the name Coronation was also suggested.
