= Eltham, New South Wales =

Locality in New South Wales

Eltham
- Town
- Coordinates: 28.759444°S 153.40833°E
- Country: Australia
- State: New South Wales
- LGA: Lismore

Population
  - Total: 332 (SAL 2021)
- Postcode: 2480

Eltham is a locality in the parish of Lismore, in the local government area of Lismore, in the state of New South Wales, Australia. It is 11 kilometres (6.8 mi) from the suburb of Goonellabah and 15 kilometres (9.3 mi) from the regional centre of Lismore. In 2021 it had a population of 332.

== History ==
Eltham was once called Mayfield, but the name was changed with the coming of the Murwillumbah railway line to the name of a town in England.

== Geology ==
Eltham straddles the Wilsons river valley, composed of sand, gravel, clay, and some alluvium; and the higher volcanic-derived lands above, which is a basalt formation with some agglomerate.

== Gallery ==
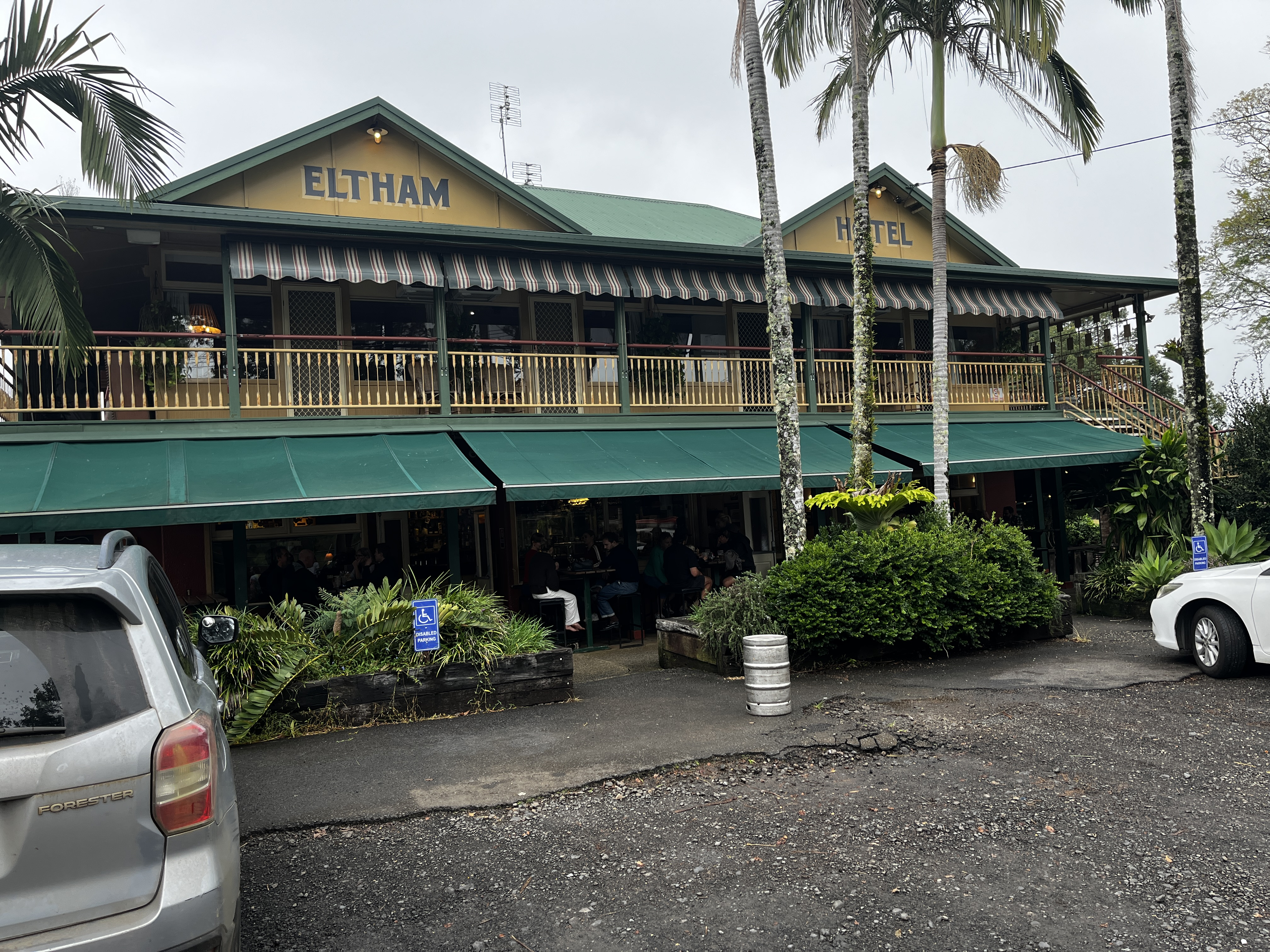
The Eltham Hotel, 2025

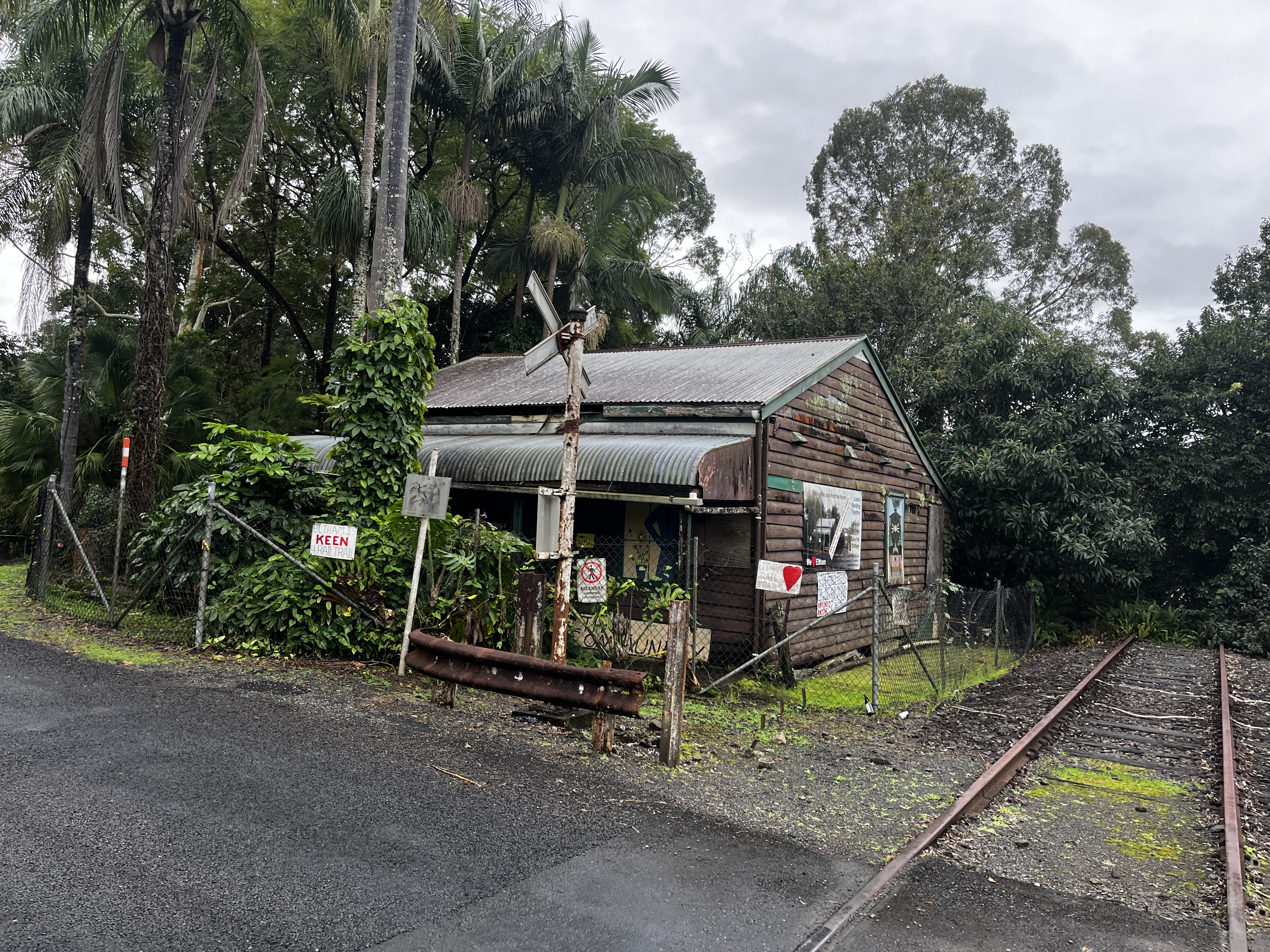
The old Eltham railway station, 2025

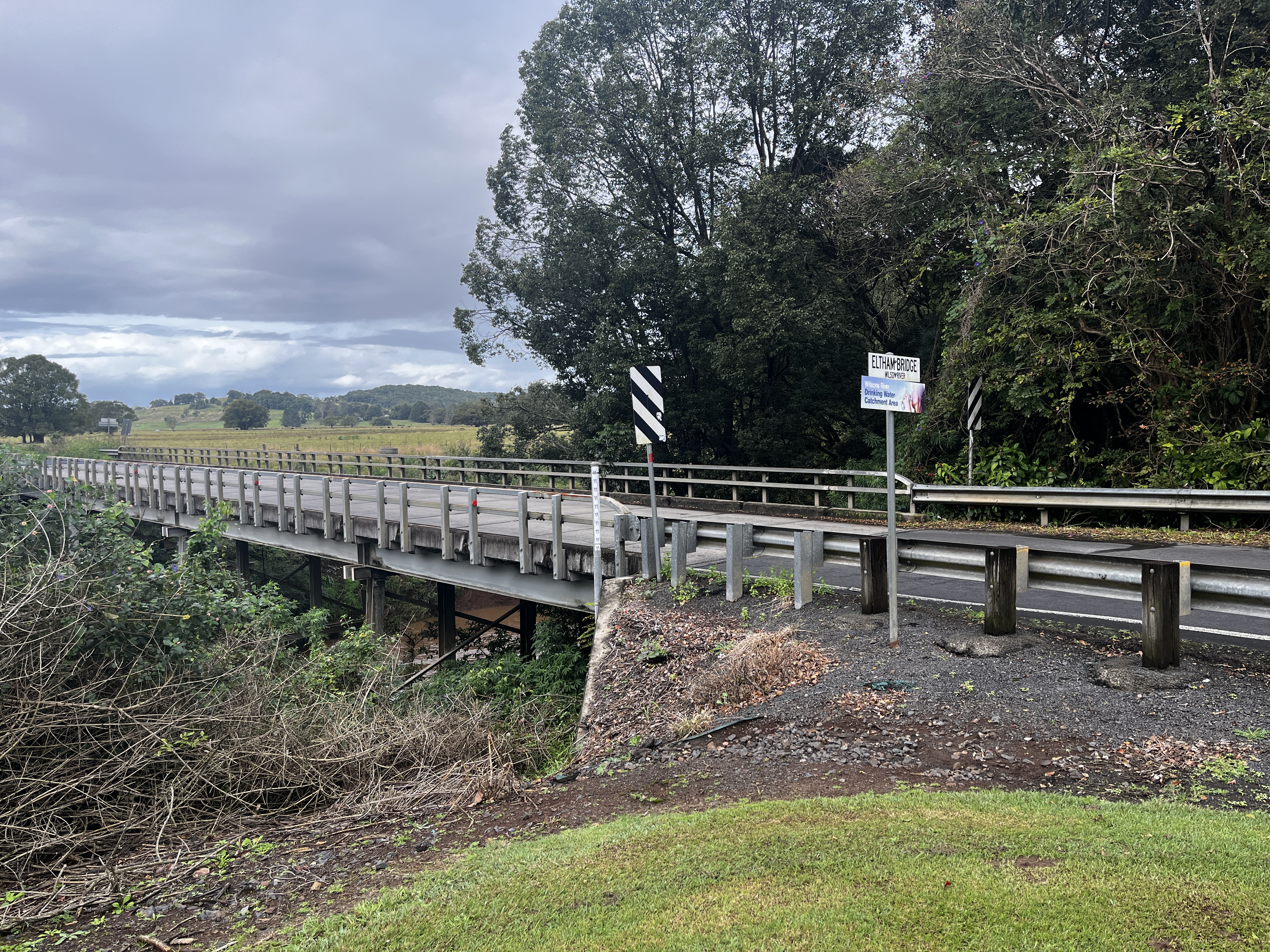
The Eltham bridge over the Wilson River, 2025
