= Gundurimba, New South Wales =

Gundurimba New South Wales
- Coordinates: 28°51′24.2″S 153°16′3.9″E
- Population: 355 (2021 census)
- Time zone: AEST (UTC+10)
  - Summer (DST): AEDT (UTC+11)
- LGA(s): City of Lismore
- Region: Northern Rivers
- State electorate(s): Lismore
- Federal division(s): Page

Gundurimba (gun-d'-RIM-ba) is a locality in the Northern Rivers region of New South Wales, Australia. It sits within the City of Lismore local government area and is located 9.6 kilometres (6.0 mi) south of Lismore. In the 2021 census it had a population of 355 people.

The traditional owners are the Widjabul and Wia-bal people of the Bundjalung Nation.

== Origin of place name ==
The name Gundurimba is likely derived from the Bundjalung language word Kundurimban which means 'frightened'. However, there are a number of alternative theories including that it is named for the words goondoorimba or goonjerimba which mean 'crossed-eyed', or 'someone who is crossed-eyed' or that is named from the word gindihrma which means 'to act in a peculiar manner' as this is where early European colonisers gave alcohol to local Aboriginal peoples.
