= Dorroughby =

- Town
- Coordinates: 28°39′54.2″S 153°21′3.9″E
- Country: Australia
- State: New South Wales
- Region: Northern Rivers
- LGA: City of Lismore

Government
  - State electorate: Lismore
  - Federal division: Page

Population
  - Total: 158 (2021 census)
- Time zone: UTC+10 (AEST)
  - Summer (DST): UTC+11 (AEDT)

Dorroughby (DURRA-bee) is a locality in the Northern Rivers region of New South Wales, Australia. It sits within the City of Lismore local government area and is located 24.4 kilometres (15.2 mi) north-east of Lismore. In the 2021 census it had a population of 158 people.

The traditional owners are the Widjabul and Wia-bal people of the Bundjalung Nation.

== Origin of place name ==
The European name for the area is said to have been taken from the Bundjalung language word durraba or dalagar meaning 'soft mud'.
