= City of Lismore =

Local government area in New South Wales, Australia

Lismore City
- Local government area
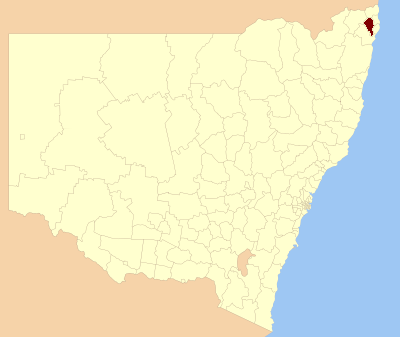
- Location in New South Wales

- Interactive map of Lismore City
- Coordinates: 28°49′S 153°17′E
- Country: Australia
- State: New South Wales
- Region: Northern Rivers
- Established: 1879 (municipality): 30 August 1946 (city)
- Council seat: Goonellabah

Government
  - Mayor: Steve Krieg
  - State electorates: Lismore; Ballina
  - Federal divisions: Page; Richmond

Area
  - Total: 1,290 km^{2} (500 sq mi)

Population
  - Total: 44,334 (LGA 2021)
- Website: Lismore City
LGAs around Lismore City
Kyogle	Tweed	Byron
Richmond Valley	Lismore City	Ballina
Richmond Valley	Richmond Valley	Ballina

The City of Lismore is a local government area in the Northern Rivers region of New South Wales, Australia. The seat of the local government area is Lismore, a major regional centre of the state.

The mayor of Lismore City Council since December 2021 is Steve Krieg.

== Towns and localities ==
=== Lismore suburbs ===
- Chilcotts Grass
- East Lismore
- Girards Hill
- Goonellabah
- Howards Grass
- Lismore
- Lismore Heights
- Loftville
- North Lismore
- Richmond Hill
- South Lismore

=== Other areas ===
- Bentley
- Bexhill
- Blakebrook
- Blue Knob
- Booerie Creek
- Buckendoon
- Bungabbee State Forest
- Caniaba
- Clunes
- Coffee Camp
- Corndale
- Dorroughby
- Dungarubba
- Dunoon
- East Coraki
- Eltham
- Fernside
- Georgica
- Goolmangar
- Gundurimba
- Jiggi
- Keerrong
- Koonorigan
- Larnook
- Leycester
- Lindendale
- McKees Hill
- Modanville
- Monaltrie
- Nimbin
- North Woodburn
- Numulgi
- Pearces Creek
- Repentance Creek
- Rock Valley
- Rosebank
- Rous Mill
- Ruthven
- South Gundurimba
- Stony Chute
- Terania Creek
- The Channon
- Tregeagle
- Tucki Tucki
- Tuckurimba
- Tullera
- Tuncester
- Tuntable Creek
- Whian Whian
- Woodlawn
- Wyrallah

== Heritage listings ==
The City of Lismore has a number of heritage-listed sites, including:

- High Conservation Value Old Growth forest

== Demographics ==
At the 2021 census, there were 44,334 people in the Lismore local government area, of these 49.1 per cent were Male and 50.9 per cent were Female. Aboriginal and Torres Strait Islander people made up 5.9 per cent of the population, which was significantly higher than the national average of 3.2 per cent. The median age of people in the City of Lismore area was 44 years, higher than the national median of 38 years. 81.7 percent of people in the city were born in Australia, almost 15 percent higher than the nation as a whole.

Population growth in the City of Lismore area between the 2001 census and the 2006 census was 1.5 per cent; and in the subsequent five years to the 2011 census, the population growth was 1.3 per cent. When compared with total population growth of Australia for the same periods, being 5.78 per cent and 8.32 per cent respectively, population growth in the Lismore local government area was significantly lower than the national average. The median weekly income for residents within the City of Lismore area was marginally lower than the national average.

At the 2021 census, the proportion of residents in the Lismore local government area who stated their ancestry as Australian or Anglo-Celtic exceeded 80 per cent of all residents (the national average was 62.9 per cent). In excess of 40 per cent of all residents in the City of Lismore at the 2021 census nominated no religious affiliation, compared to the national average of 38.4 per cent. As at the census date, compared to the national average, households in the Lismore local government area had a significantly lower than average proportion (7.2 per cent) where two or more languages are spoken (the national average was 24.8 per cent); and a significantly higher proportion (87.4 per cent) where English only was spoken at home (the national average was 24.8 per cent).

Selected historical census data for the City of Lismore local government area
Census year		2001	2006	2011	2016	2021
Population	Estimated residents on Census night	41,572	▲42,210	▲42,766	▲43,135	▲44,334
Population	LGA rank in terms of size within New South Wales			48		
Population	% of New South Wales population			0.62%	▼0.57%	▼0.54%
Population	% of Australian population	0.22%	0.22%	▼0.20%	▼0.18%	▼0.17%
Cultural and language diversity						
Ancestry, top responses	Australian			31.4%	▼29.4%	▲39.6%
Ancestry, top responses	English			30.0%	▼29.4%	▲41.2%
Ancestry, top responses	Irish			10.8%	10.8%	▼14.3%
Ancestry, top responses	Scottish			8.2%	▲8.3%	▲12.1%
Ancestry, top responses	Australian Aboriginal			–	–	5.6%
Language, top responses (other than English)	Italian	0.2%	▲0.9%	0.9%	▼0.7%	▼0.4%
Language, top responses (other than English)	German	0.6%	▼0.4%	▲0.5%	0.5%	0.5%
Language, top responses (other than English)	Punjabi	n/c	n/c	–	–	0.4%
Language, top responses (other than English)	French	0.1%	0.1%	▲0.2%	0.2%	▲0.3%
Language, top responses (other than English)	Spanish	0.1%	0.1%	–	–	0.3%
Religious affiliation						
Religious affiliation, top responses	No Religion	15.2%	▲19.3%	▲24.8%	▲32.7%	▲42.1%
Religious affiliation, top responses	Catholic	25.8%	▼25.5%	▼24.5%	▼21.1%	▼18.3%
Religious affiliation, top responses	Anglican	21.9%	▼20.7%	▼18.7%	▼14.6%	▼11.5%
Religious affiliation, top responses	Uniting Church	7.8%	▼7.3%	▼6.2%	▼4.7%	–
Religious affiliation, top responses	Presbyterian and Reformed	6.4%	▼6.2%	▼5.6%	–	3.5%
Median weekly incomes						
Personal income	Median weekly personal income		$378	▲$469	▲$550	▲$685
Personal income	% of Australian median income		81.1%	▲81.3%	▲83.0%	▲85.0%
Family income	Median weekly family income		A$993	▲ A$1,123	▲ A$1,351	▲ A$1,719
Family income	% of Australian median income		84.8%	▼75.8%	▲77.9%	▲81.0%
Household income	Median weekly household income		A$760	▲ A$907	▲ A$1,067	▲ A$1,319
Household income	% of Australian median income		74.0%	▼73.5%	▲74.2%	▲75.5%

== Council ==
=== Current composition and election method ===
The governing body of Lismore City Council comprises eleven councillors, including the mayor, for a fixed four-year term. The mayor is popularly elected using the optional preferential system, while the ten other councillors are elected using the proportional representation system. There are no wards. The most recent election was held in 2024, and the makeup of the council, including the mayor, is as follows:

Party	Councillors
Steve Krieg for Lismore	6
Greens	2
Labor	2
Independent	1
Total	11

=== Executive management ===
Lismore City Council is managed by a general manager and three executive officers. Senior management turnover is significant at Lismore.

General manager Gary Murphy left the organisation in late 2018 and was replaced by Shelley Oldham. Shelley Oldham's employment was terminated in February 2021. Michael Donnelly replaced Shelley Oldham as an interim general manager before being offered a contract by the outgoing council late in 2021. Following the election in December 2021, the Krieg Team secured control of council and sacked Michael Donnelly. The Krieg Team appointed John Walker as interim general manager in February 2022. Following an employment process which started late in 2022, John Walker declined to apply for the permanent position. In February 2023, Jon Gibbons was appointed General Manager. However, he resigned due to personal reasons in early 2025 and was replaced by Eber Butron. Eber joined Lismore City Council as Director of Partnership, Planning and Engagement in 2021 before being appointed Chief Community Office.

== Election results ==
=== 2024 ===
2024 New South Wales local elections: Lismore
Party	Candidate	Votes	%	±%
Steve Krieg for Lismore	1. Steve Krieg; 2. Jerilee Hall (elected); 3. Andrew Gordon (elected); 4. Electra Jensen (elected); 5. Andrew Bing (elected); 6. Gianpiero Battista (elected); 7. Nardia Pidcock; 8. Chris King; 9. Tara Cole; 10. Mitchell Dowse; 11. Richelle Weekes	12,240	48.7	−0.5
Greens	1. Adam Guise (elected); 2. Virginia Waters (elected); 3. Luke Robinson; 4. Shae Salmon; 5. Lindall Watson; 6. Binnie O'Dwyer	5,435	21.6	+6.9
Labor	1. Harper Dalton-Earls (elected); 2. Jasmine Knight-Smith (elected); 3. Kevin Bell; 4. Joy Knight-Smith; 5. Lewis Tayloe; 6. Glenys Ritchie; 7. William Harrison	4,127	16.4	+4.1
Independent	1. Big Rob (elected); 2. Shaen Springall; 3. Luke Tanttari; 4. Christopher Knight; 5. Stella Coleman	2,961	11.8	+4.3
Independent	John Jenkins	379	1.5	+1.5
Total formal votes		25,142	94.0	−1.8
Informal votes		1,616	6.0	+1.8
Turnout		26,758	83.8	−2.1

=== 2021 ===
Elected councillor	Party
Peter Colby	Steve Krieg
Jeri Hall	Steve Krieg
Andrew Gordon	Steve Krieg
Electra Jensen	Steve Krieg
Andrew Bing	Steve Krieg
Vanessa Grindon-Ekins	Greens
Adam Guise	Greens
Darlene Cook	Labor
Elly Bird	OSF
Big Rob	Independent

2021 New South Wales local elections: Lismore
Party	Candidate	Votes	%	±%
	Steve Krieg for Lismore	12,766	49.2	+49.2
	Greens	3,820	14.7	+0.8
	Labor	3,195	12.3	−10.3
	Our Sustainable Future	2,769	10.7	+0.0
	Independent	1,948	7.5	
	Independent Lismore	797	3.1	
	Animal Justice	653	2.5	+2.5
Total formal votes		25,948	95.8	
Informal votes		1,140	4.2	
Turnout		27,088	85.9	

== Sister cities ==
Lismore has sister city relations with the following cities:

- Isle of Lismore, Scotland
- Yamatotakada, Japan, since 1963
- (Republic of Ireland) Lismore, Ireland, since 2000
- (United States) Eau Claire, Wisconsin, USA, since 2001
- Makassar, Indonesia
