= Bexhill, Saskatchewan =

Community in Saskatchewan, Canada

Coordinates: 49°34′00″N 106°02′04″W

Location of Bexhill in Saskatchewan

Bexhill is an unincorporated community in the Canadian province of Saskatchewan.
