= Caniaba =

Locality in New South Wales, Australia

Coordinates: 28°49′28″S 153°12′33″E

Caniaba is a village in New South Wales, Australia, on the outskirts of Lismore.
