= The Channon, New South Wales =

Village in New South Wales, Australia

Coordinates: 28°40′S 153°17′E

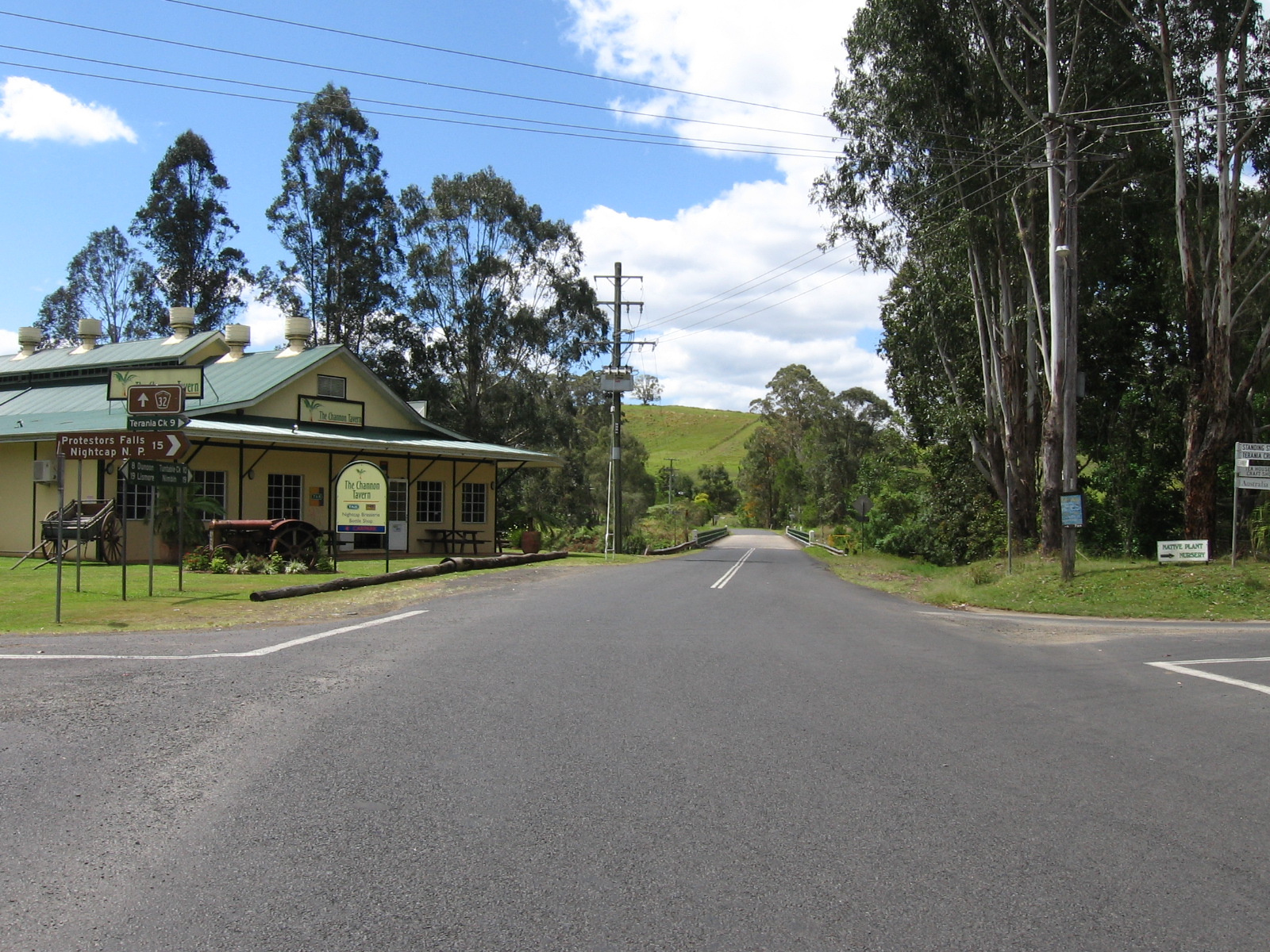
Main street of The Channon

The Channon is a village in the Northern Rivers area of New South Wales, Australia. It is about 18 kilometres northwest of Lismore and about 21 km from Nimbin, NSW. It is part of the City of Lismore.

The traditional owners of this area are the Wiyabal people of the Bundjalung nation.

The name of the village, Channon, comes from a local Aboriginal term for the Burrawang palm, having been derived from the word dganon (from the Yugambeh–Bundjalung languages), which is a type of cycad that proliferates along the ridgelines in the area.

== History ==
=== Aboriginal history ===
Prior to the arrival of Europeans in the area, the region now known as the Channon (basically, the ridges and valleys in the region of Terania and Tuntable Creeks) was part of the land occupied by a portion of the Bundjalung people, the Widjabal. According to local tradition one of their foods was the seeds of the Burrawang, Macrozamia communis, a species of cycad that is abundant in the area; the seeds of the Burrawang, known as Djaning, are toxic but can be prepared for eating via extensive washing. It is considered that the name "The Channon" derives from this native word. A cave in Terania Creek was a sacred site for Widjabal men, as well as other sites in the Terania Creek basin, but according to Heron, 1998, quoted in Barratt, "Many of the stories belonging to the Terania Creek Basin will never be published. Only the elders have been told their deep spiritual significance and their laws forbid them to pass on information to any uninitiated person." Following European settlement as described below, Aboriginal people continued to live in the district working on farms and living on several local reserves, until in 1929, threatened with loss of control of their reserve, they moved first to North Lismore and then to a site at Tuncester called Cubawee and later to Gundurimba [sic: actually Gundurimba Road, Monaltrie, just outside Lismore], and finally were able to move to better housing in Lismore in the 1970s; many of the relevant family members were given the European surname of Roberts, and some still reside in Lismore.

=== European utilisation and settlement ===
Barratt, 1999 states that some time after the 1840s, early cedar cutters were working their way up the Richmond River and that a work place for timber "up Terania Creek" was destroyed by a flood in 1849, that a "small camp" was made on the banks of the Terania Creek, and that cedar cutting continued into the 1880s and 1890s. The cutters were not permitted to settle or build permanent houses. The first actual settlers in the area were Don and Jim Thorburn whose land title was allocated in 1882; they were followed by William Hall plus members of his family in 1900. Twelve more persons led by James Mitchell from Sydney decided to apply for land and eleven were successful, being allocated land in 1902, originally planning to operate a sawmill but eventually deciding to go into dairying after clearing their blocks. Over the period 1903 to 1911 a number of other settlers arrived and were granted blocks on either Tuntable or Terania Creeks. In 1904, Edwin Roach, who had recently set up a sawmill at Lismore, decided to relocate his plant to the area at the corner of what became Mill Street and Standing Street and a small village began to take shape there, known at that time as Roach's Mill, and later, Terania.

In 1908 the decision was made to transfer the early mail Receiving Office, on top of a ridge at Wallace Road, to its present location and at this point the name of the settlement was officially changed from "Terania" to "The Channon".

Once the settlers had cleared their land of the native forest, dairying became the principal occupation of the district for many years. Cream was the product desired for making into butter for local consumption and export, and the skimmed milk left behind would be fed to pigs on site. Up to 1913, cream would be transported by wagon via specialist cream carriers to Lismore for processing, then in that year a local processing plant or "Butter Factory" was opened with great ceremony. Barratt notes that "it is likely that the journey made from the coast to The Channon [for the official opening] was one of the first made to the area in a motor car." The working life of The Channon butter factory lasted until 1946, when improved road and rail transport meant that it was no longer economic to operate small local factories such as this one, and production was moved to Lismore; the factory building was sold, first to Terania Shire Council for use as a depot, then eventually (1991) was reopened as a Tavern, in which guise it survives today. (Note: The butter factory at The Channon was one of 20 in the region operating in the early part of the 20th century under the auspices of the North Coast Co-operative Limited, subsequently renamed Norco; at their peak of operation these comprised local factories at Byron Bay, Murwillumbah, Lismore, Kyogle, Tweed Heads, Tyalgum, Uki, Binna Burra, Ballina, Corndale, Bonalbo, Ettrick, Mt Lindesay, Alstonville, Coraki, Nimbin, Dunoon, The Channon, Cawongla and Wiangaree. All were ultimately closed between the 1940s and 1970s as production was centralised to larger operations such as that at Lismore; many of these large buildings have now been re-purposed and are used e.g. as shopping venues, taverns (in this instance) or, in the case of Nimbin, the Nimbin Bush Theatre, associated restaurant, and a fully operational candle factory.)

For a range of reasons including increasing regulation and the cost of upgrading dairies and road infrastructure, from the late 1960s there was a gradual decline in dairy farming in the Northern Rivers area and many farmers turned to the production of beef cattle instead, or sold their land to neighbours, hobby farmers or speculators.

The "new bridge" over Terania Creek was opened in 1912, which coincided with the opening of a new Hall, the previous one (opened in 1907) having been destroyed in a fire. This Hall was originally sited between the present F.C. Ford Bridge and the Koonorigan Road turn-off, but was moved to its present site in about 1924.

The first Channon Store was opened by Joseph Black, but was superseded by a competitor built by Rue Friedman on the site of the present Store, which opened in 1909. Other past local businesses included a butcher's shop, a bakery and a blacksmith's, and a boarding house. The butcher's shop, adjacent to the present Store, closed in the 1960s but the premises were revived for a number of years as a Tea House (café), unfortunately now also closed as at time of writing (2024).

Following the end of the First World War, a set of memorial gates was commissioned which stand at the entrance to the Hall; the gates were re-dedicated in 1950 and the inscriptions expanded to include those who had died in active service during the Second World War. According to the inscriptions, plus the Roll of Honour board inside the Hall, 42 local men were enlisted in World War I of whom 10 were wounded and 6 killed, while 90 local men served in World War II of whom 8 were killed. Additional details about these gates and the names included thereon are given in the online "NSW War Memorials Register".

The present Channon Public School (NSW primary school) dates from 1922, having been preceded by several previous incarnations dating from 1905 and 1909 at both the Channon (then known as "Channon Grass") and Tuntable Creek. A significant local amenity, Coronation Park, was opened around the occasion of the Queen's coronation in 1953. A small Rural Fire Service (RFS) was established in the 1970s and has a building in Standing Street.

Coinciding with the decline of the dairy industry in the region as detailed above, land prices were low in the early 1970s and proved attractive to "new settlers" in search of alternative lifestyles flowing on from the 1973 Aquarius Festival held in nearby Nimbin, with several new Multiple Occupancy (M.O.) communities established in the Channon area. Many of the new settlers were active in the month-long Terania Creek Blockade in 1979 which was a key influencer for the New South Wales Government to cease commercial logging in the wet rainforests, leading ultimately to the declaration of the Nightcap National Park.

The now regionally recognised Channon Craft Market commenced in 1976, first in the Hall, but fairly rapidly grew in size and relocated to Coronation Oval, where it continues to operate once per month.

== Economy ==
Like many villages in the area, there is cattle farming, general grazing and small crop farming. There are also many permaculture and organic farms and macadamia and coffee plantations, as well as a number of intentional communities. Zaytuna Farm is a working permaculture education and demonstration farm, whose managing director is Geoff Lawton. Like nearby Nimbin, The Channon is a gateway to the rainforests of Nightcap National Park.

== Events ==
On the second Sunday of each month, the Channon Crafts Market is held at Coronation Park which attracts visitors, musicians and vendors from around the district.

The Coronation Park hosts a yearly outdoor opera, though it did not take place in 2016.

== Bibliography ==
- Barratt, Pauline (1999). Around the Channon - A History of its Places and People. Pauline Barratt (publisher), The Channon, New South Wales. ISBN 0-646-36487-1.
