= Bexhill, New South Wales =

Bexhill Bullawai or Bullawhay (Bandjalang)
- Town
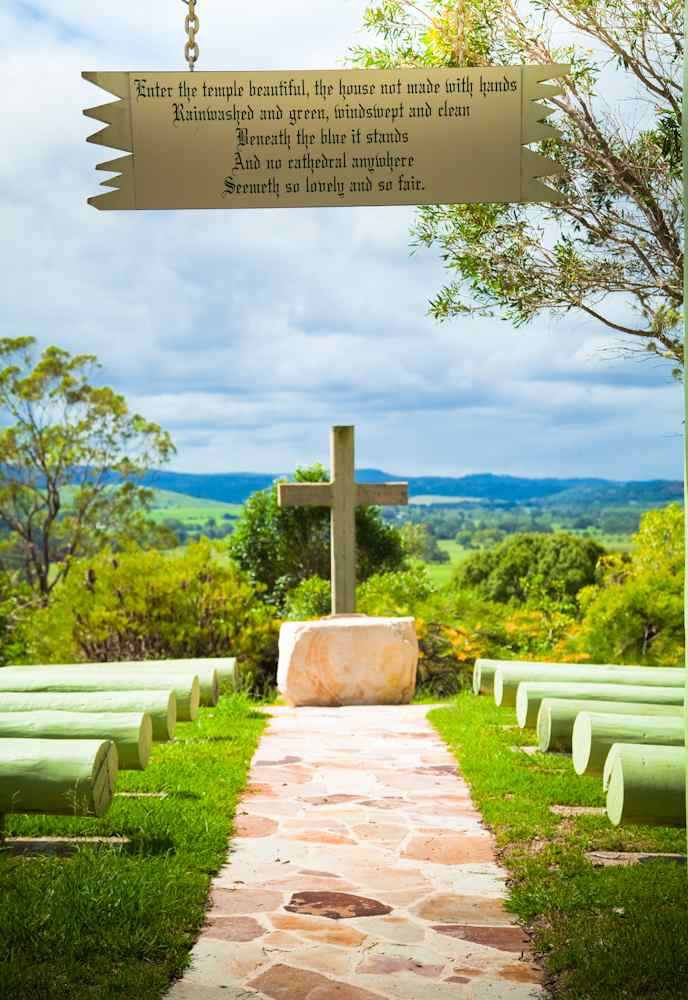
- Bexhill open air cathedral

- Coordinates: 28°45′S 153°21′E
- Country: Australia
- State: New South Wales
- LGA: City of Lismore
- Location: 35 km (22 mi) from Byron Bay; 11 km (6.8 mi) from Lismore

Government
  - State electorate: Lismore
  - Federal division: Richmond

Population
  - Total: 495 (2016 census)
- Postcode: 2480

Bexhill is a small village in New South Wales, Australia. As of 2006, the town had a population of 472 people. It is located about 35 kilometres (22 mi) from Byron Bay and about 11 kilometres (7 mi) from Lismore and is within the City of Lismore local government area.

It is on the Murwillumbah railway line and on Bangalow Road.

The traditional owners of this area are the Widjabul people of the Bundjalung nation.

== Origin of place name ==
Early colonists to the region called this area Bald Hill, after a nearby hill, but to reduce confusion it was renamed during surveys taken by Thomas Ewing in the 1880s who renamed it Beck's Hill, after Beck - a young man who assisted him. This later transformed through local usage to become Bexhill and an alternate theory suggests that it was named for Bexhill-on-Sea, in England.

It has also been suggested that it was derived from the Bundjalung language word "Bullawai" or "Bullawhay"; these are alternate spellings of the name of a flame tree common to the region.

== Attractions ==
Bexhill is well known for its open air cathedral which is managed by volunteers from the nearby Uniting Church. The "cathedral" has native gardens and overlooks a large length of valley and hills along Coopers Creek. It is well used for wedding services and special events.

The village also contains an old quarry, formerly the Bexhill Brickworks, which is officially closed for recreational purposes. In 2016, the Daily Telegraph reported that the water had high levels of acidity but many people swim there despite the closure.

The Bexhill Quarry Parklands Association has been set up with the aim of developing the site into a regional parkland for visitors and residents. The quarry site would be linked with the planned Northern Rivers Rail Trail which is partly complete.

The regeneration plan for the quarry was boosted in July 2023 by $2000 in funding from Greater Bank's #GreaterNorthernRivers Community Funding program.

== Geography ==
The village is located on the end of a ridge of basalt hills. The village itself is located on sedimentary rocks of the Clarence Moreton Basin and is surrounded by the Wilsons River and Coopers Creek flood plains.

== History ==
Bexhill, established in the early 19th century, was the central point of the early North Coast of New South Wales. In the 19th century Bexhill was known as Baldhill.

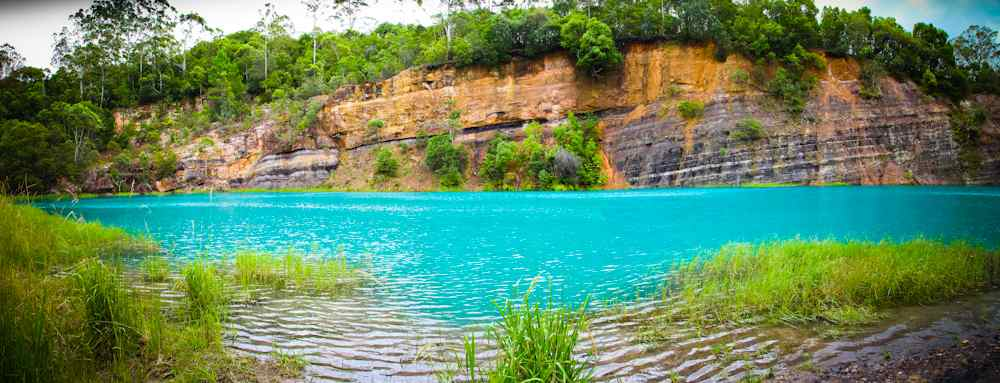
Bexhill Old brick pit

Bexhill's early production was red cedar logging, its close proximity to Boat Harbour made the floating of logs an easy task during flood waters. The Bexhill Public School (established around 1850) was subject to easy flooding as well, and was eventually relocated to higher ground. After the Federation of Australia the population of Bexhill began to dwindle.

The trades it produced were no longer as vital and people started to migrate to more lively parts of the far north coast. With the population slowly moving out, parts of Bexhill began to close. The post office which brought the surrounding areas its post closed down, relocating to Lismore. The Bexhill Brick works which produced the bricks for the far north coast closed down towards the end of the 1990s, unable to keep up with the production of bricks from Coffs Harbour and Newcastle.
