= Wiyabal =

Indigenous Australian people

The Wiyabal (also Widjabal, possibly from confusion of the letter ⟨j⟩ in the older spelling Wijabal) are an Aboriginal Australian people of the state of New South Wales. They may be a clan of the Bundjalung people.

== Country ==
Norman Tindale assigned the Widyabal about 600 square miles (1,600 km^{2}) of territory on the Upper Richmond River, running south from Kyogle to the area in the vicinity of Casino, with their eastern limits at Dunoon.

They have been described as a clan of the Bundjalung people.

== Alternative names ==
- Ettrick tribe
- Noowidal
- Nowgyjul
- Waibra
- Watchee
- Watji

Source: Tindale 1974, p. 200

== Some words ==
- groomon or kroomon (kangaroo)
- kooning (mother)
- marmong (father)
- tobury (tame dog)
- tucki (white man)

Source: Edwards 1887, p. 288

== Notable people ==
- Rhoda Roberts, journalist and artistic director
- Frank Roberts (1945–2011), boxer, one of three first Indigenous Australians to participate in the Olympics, in the 1964 Tokyo Olympics
