= Division of Page =

Australian federal electoral division

Coordinates: 29.275°S 152.804°E

Page Australian House of Representatives Division
- Interactive map of electorate boundaries from the 2025 federal election
- Created: 1984
- MP: Kevin Hogan
- Party: Nationals
- Namesake: Sir Earle Page
- Electors: 129,450 (2025)
- Area: 19,335 km^{2} (7,465.3 sq mi)
- Demographic: Rural
Electorates around Page:
New England	Wright (QLD)	Richmond
New England	Page	Pacific Ocean
New England	Cowper	Pacific Ocean

The Division of Page is an Australian electoral division in the state of New South Wales. It stretches from Korora to the Queensland border, comprising the Pacific coast until Empire Vale, including inland settlements such as Lismore, Grafton and Casino.

Since 2013, its MP has been Kevin Hogan of the National Party.

== History ==
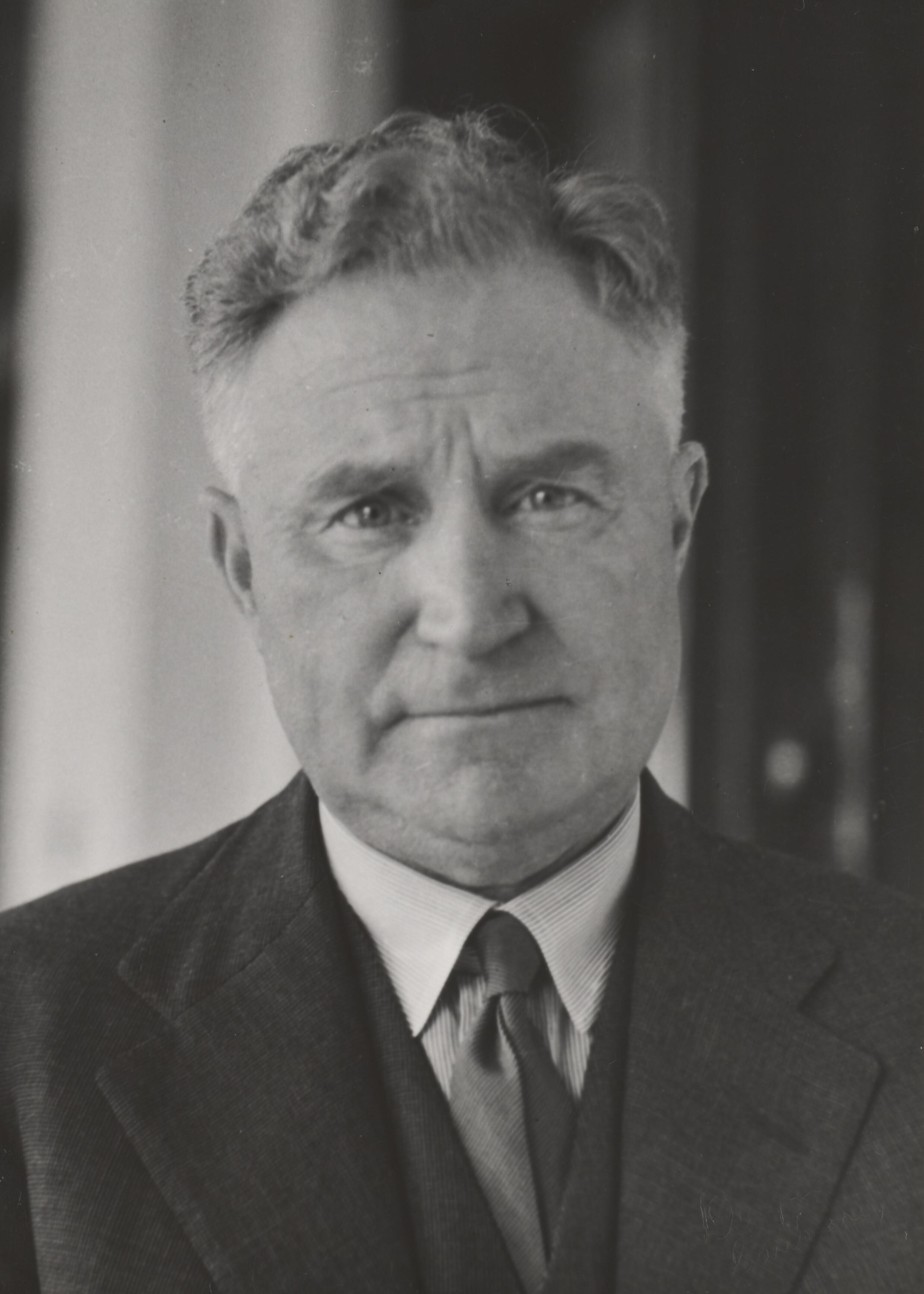
Sir Earle Page, the division's namesake

The division is named after the Right Honourable Sir Earle Page, the second leader of the Country Party of Australia and the Prime Minister of Australia after the death of Joseph Lyons in 1939. The division was proclaimed at the redistribution of 11 October 1984, and was first contested at the 1984 federal election.

Since its creation, Page has usually been a marginal seat, frequently changing hands between the National Party and the Labor Party, with neither party gaining more than 55% of the two party preferred vote at any election except for the 1984 election, the 2019 election and the 2022 Australian federal election . It was considered a bellwether seat from the 1990 election until 2022, when it was comfortably won by the National Party, despite the victory of the Labor Party under Anthony Albanese. Though results vary by election, booths in the City of Lismore LGA are usually Labor's strongest results, while the more rural booths generally deliver strong votes for the Nationals candidate.

It was previously held by Ian Causley, the Deputy Speaker of the Australian House of Representatives. Causley retired at the 2007 election, and Chris Gulaptis, a former Mayor of Maclean, was endorsed as the Nationals' candidate. Labor selected Janelle Saffin, a former member of the New South Wales Legislative Council, who took the seat with a swing of around 8 per cent. Saffin increased her majority in 2010, however was defeated in 2013 by the Nationals' Kevin Hogan, who won with a swing of 6.71 per cent.

Hogan moved to the crossbench in 2018 in protest over the spate of leadership spills in the Liberal Party. However, he still supported the Coalition on confidence and supply, and remained a National in good standing. He rejoined the Coalition before the 2019 election and contested that as a Nationals endorsed candidate.

== Boundaries ==
Since 1984, federal electoral division boundaries in Australia have been determined at redistributions by a redistribution committee appointed by the Australian Electoral Commission. Redistributions occur for the boundaries of divisions in a particular state, and they occur every seven years, or sooner if a state's representation entitlement changes or when divisions of a state are malapportioned.

The division is located in the far north-east of the state, adjoining the border with Queensland and the Tasman Sea. It includes the towns of Lismore, Casino, Grafton, Tyringham, Bonalbo, Nimbin, Yamba and Iluka. Originally, much of its current territory (including Page's home of Grafton) was located in neighbouring Cowper, which Page represented from 1919 to 1961. In February 2016, Page's borders were extended as far south as Sapphire Beach.

== Members ==
Image	Member	Party	Term	Notes
	Ian Robinson (1925–2017)	Nationals	1 December 1984 – 24 March 1990	Previously held the Division of Cowper. Lost seat
	Harry Woods (1947–)	Labor	24 March 1990 – 2 March 1996	Lost seat. Later elected to the New South Wales Legislative Assembly seat of Clarence in 1996
	Ian Causley (1940–2020)	Nationals	2 March 1996 – 17 October 2007	Previously held the New South Wales Legislative Assembly seat of Clarence. Retired
	Janelle Saffin (1954–)	Labor	24 November 2007 – 7 September 2013	Previously a member of the New South Wales Legislative Council. Lost seat. Later elected to the New South Wales Legislative Assembly seat of Lismore in 2019
	Kevin Hogan (1963–)	Nationals	7 September 2013 – 24 August 2018	Incumbent
	Kevin Hogan (1963–)	Independent National	24 August 2018 – 21 May 2019	Incumbent
	Kevin Hogan (1963–)	Nationals	21 May 2019 – present	Incumbent

== Election results ==
2025 Australian federal election: Page
Party	Candidate	Votes	%	±%
National	Kevin Hogan	48,049	44.66	−0.78
Labor	Wendy Backhous	23,711	22.04	+3.46
Greens	Luke Robinson	16,265	15.12	+6.69
One Nation	Peter Nottle	6,132	5.70	+0.31
Trumpet of Patriots	Donna Lee Pike	2,932	2.73	+1.97
Shooters, Fishers, Farmers	Josh Pianca	2,345	2.18	+2.18
Independent	Richard Wells	2,260	2.10	+2.10
Family First	Andrew Grady	2,235	2.08	+2.08
Libertarian	Brenton Williams	1,495	1.39	−2.34
Independent	Jordan Colless	1,431	1.33	+1.33
Citizens	Jennifer Baker	739	0.69	+0.69
Total formal votes		107,594	90.61	−2.45
Informal votes		11,145	9.39	+2.45
Turnout		118,739	91.78	+1.33
Two-party-preferred result
National	Kevin Hogan	63,788	59.29	−1.36
Labor	Wendy Backhous	43,806	40.71	+1.36
National hold		Swing	−1.36	
