= Norman Robinson =

Norman Robinson may refer to:

- Norman Lubbock Robinson (1890-1951), took historic photos of Canada's North
- Norm Robinson (1900–1980), Australian rugby league footballer, coach and administrator
- Norman Robinson (priest) (1905–1973), Anglican Provost of Blackburn
- Frank Norman Robinson (1911–1997), Australian sound recording technician and ornithologist
- Norman Robinson (journalist) (born 1951), news anchor for WDSU-TV New Orleans Channel 6 (NBC)
- Norman Robinson Stakes, an Australian thoroughbred horse race since 1978
- Norman Robinson (actor)
- Norman Robinson (karate) (1936–2025), South African martial artist
- Norman Robinson (rugby league), rugby league footballer of the 1940s
- Norman Robinson (footballer) (1921–1990), English footballer
- Norman Robinson (baseball) (1913–1984), American baseball player
