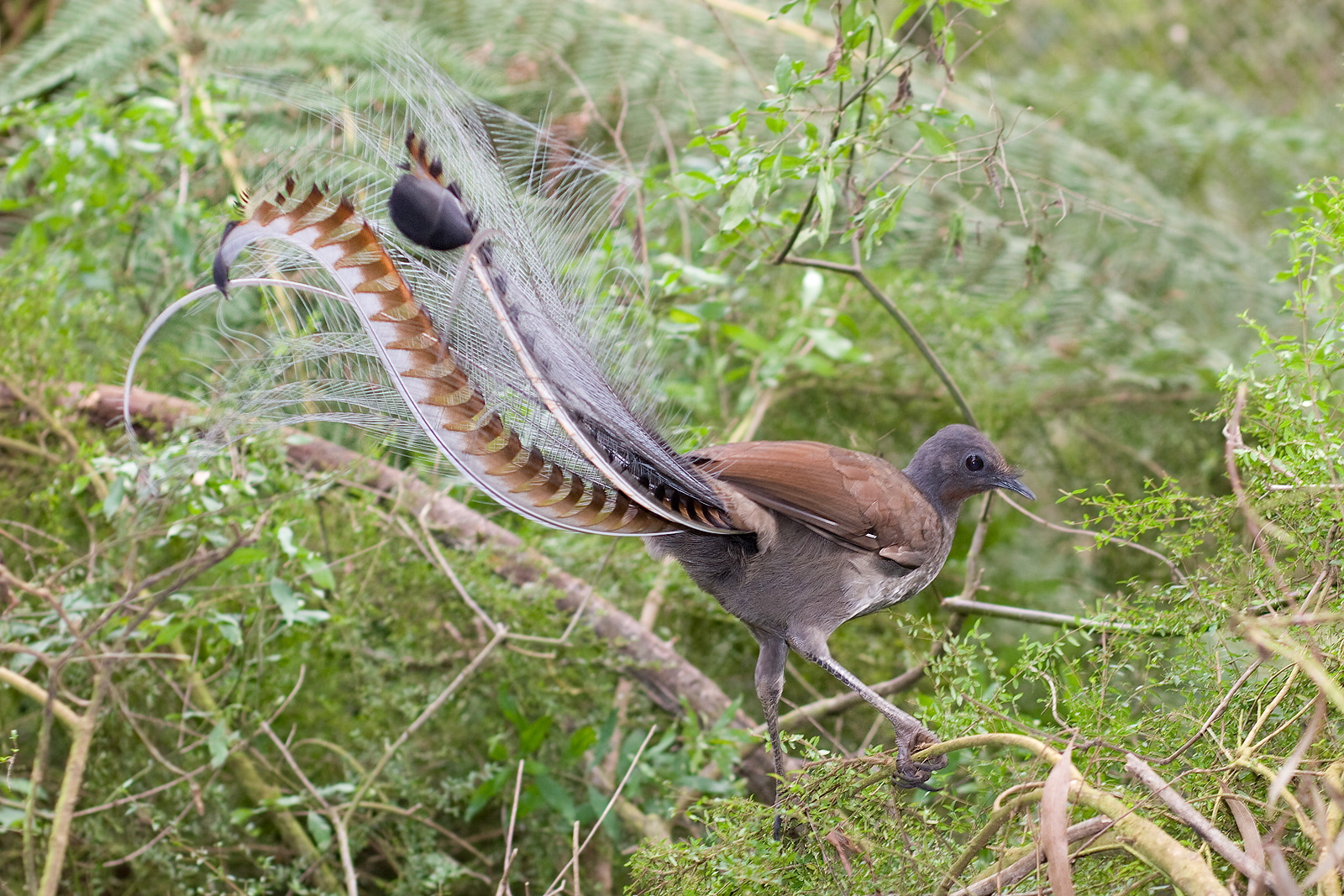
- Superb lyrebird (Menura novaehollandiae)

Scientific classification
- Kingdom: Animalia
- Phylum: Chordata
- Class: Aves
- Order: Passeriformes
- Infraorder: Menurides
- Family: Menuridae; Lesson, 1828
- Genus: Menura; Latham, 1801

Type species
- Menura novaehollandiae Latham 1801

Species
- Menura novaehollandiae; Menura alberti; †Menura tyawanoides

= Lyrebird =

Lyrebird Temporal range: Early Miocene to present

Genus of birds

A lyrebird is either of two species of ground-dwelling Australian birds that compose the genus Menura, and the family Menuridae. They are most notable for their ability to mimic a variety of natural and artificial sounds from their environment and for the striking beauty of the male bird's huge tail when it is fanned out in courtship display. Lyrebirds have unique plumes of neutral-coloured tailfeathers and are among Australia's best-known native birds.

== Taxonomy ==
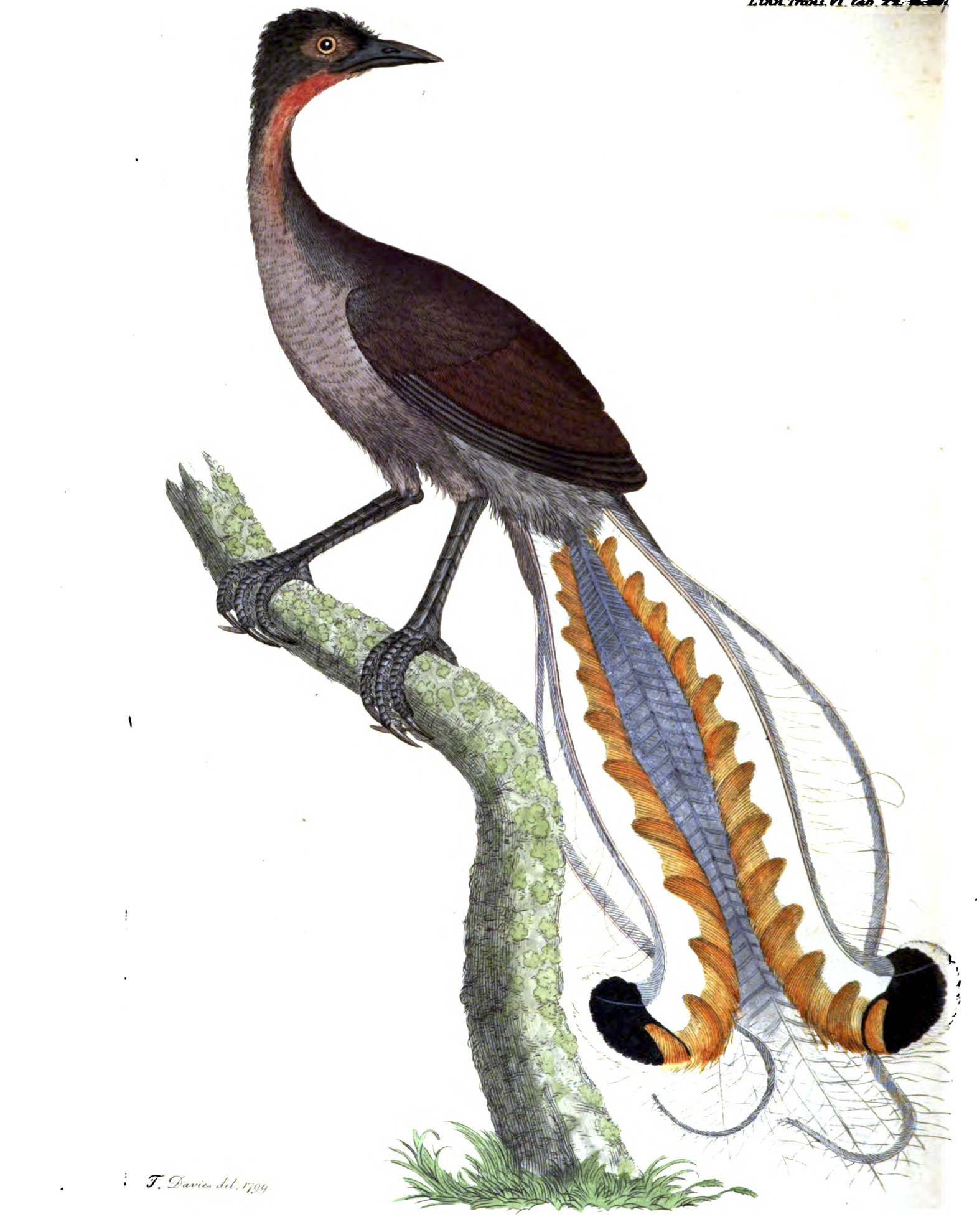
Menura novaehollandiae – superb lyrebird (1800) by Thomas Davies

The classification of lyrebirds was the subject of much debate after the first specimens reached European scientists after 1798. Based on specimens sent from New South Wales to England, Major-General Thomas Davies illustrated and described this species as the superb lyrebird, which he called Menura superba, in an 1800 presentation to the Linnean Society of London. This work was not published until 1802, though, and in the intervening time, the species was described and named Menura novaehollandiae by John Latham in 1801, and this is the accepted name by virtue of nomenclatural priority.

The genus name Menura refers to the pattern of repeated transparent crescents (or "lunules") on the superb lyrebird's outer tail feathers, from the Ancient Greek words μήνη mēnē "moon" and ουρά ourá "tail".

Lyrebirds are named because their outer tail feathers are broad and curved in a S-shape that together resemble the shape of a lyre.

=== Systematics ===
Lyrebirds were thought to be Galliformes like the broadly similar-looking partridge, junglefowl, and pheasants familiar to Europeans, as reflected in the early names given to the superb lyrebird, including native pheasant. They were also called peacock-wrens and Australian birds-of-paradise. The idea that they were related to the pheasants was abandoned when the first chicks, which are altricial, were described. They were not classed with the passerines until a paper was published in 1840, about 12 years after they were assigned a discrete family, the Menuridae. Within that family, they comprise a single genus, Menura.

The lyrebird family is generally accepted to be most closely related to the scrub-birds (Atrichornithidae), and some authorities combine both in a single family, but evidence that they are also related to the bowerbirds remains controversial.

Lyrebirds are ancient Australian animals; the Australian Museum has fossils of lyrebirds dating back about 15 million years. The prehistoric Menura tyawanoides has been described from Early Miocene fossils found at the famous Riversleigh site.

=== Species ===
Two species of lyrebird are extant:

Genus Menura – Latham, 1801 – two species
Common name	Scientific name and subspecies	Range	Size and ecology	IUCN status and estimated population
Superb lyrebird, called weringerong, woorail, and bulln-bulln in Aboriginal languages	Menura novaehollandiae Latham, 1801 Three subspecies: M. n. edwardi; M. n. novaehollandiae; M. n. victoriae	South-eastern Australia, from southern Victoria to south-eastern Queensland	Size: One of the world's largest songbirds, it is noted for its elaborate tail and excellent mimicry. Habitat: Diet:	LC
Albert's lyrebird or northern lyrebird	Menura alberti Bonaparte, 1850	Between New South Wales and Queensland, Australia	Size: Named in honour of Prince Albert, the husband of Queen Victoria Habitat: Diet:	LC

== Description ==
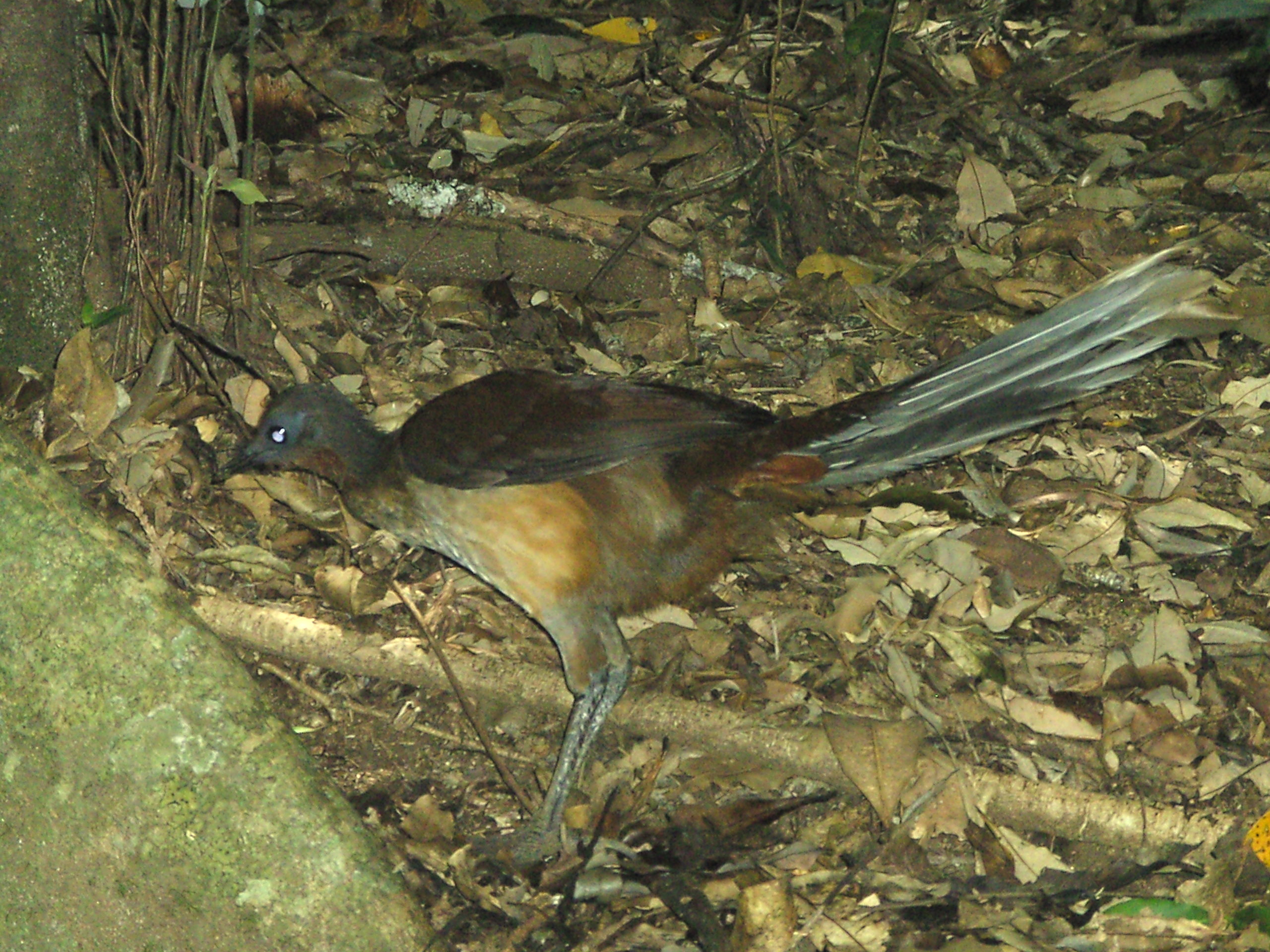
Female Albert's lyrebird

The lyrebirds are large passerine birds, among the largest in the order. They are ground-living birds with strong legs and feet and short, rounded wings. They are poor fliers and rarely fly except for periods of downhill gliding. The superb lyrebird is the larger of the two species. Lyrebirds measure 31 to 39 inches in length, including their tails. Males tend to be slightly larger than females. Females weigh around 2.0 pounds, and males weigh around 2.4 pounds.

== Distribution and habitat ==
The superb lyrebird is found in areas of rainforest in Victoria, New South Wales, and south-east Queensland. It is also found in Tasmania, where it was introduced in the 19th century. Many superb lyrebirds live in the Dandenong Ranges National Park and Kinglake National Park around Melbourne, the Royal National Park and Illawarra region south of Sydney, many other parks along the east coast of Australia, and unprotected bushland. Albert's lyrebird is found only in a small area of southern Queensland rainforest.

== Behaviour and ecology ==
Lyrebirds are shy and difficult to approach, particularly Albert's lyrebird, so little information about its behaviour has been documented. When lyrebirds detect potential danger, they pause and scan the surroundings, sound an alarm, and either flee the area on foot or seek cover and freeze. Firefighters sheltering in mine shafts during bushfires have been joined by lyrebirds.

=== Diet and feeding ===
Albert's lyrebird

Lyrebirds feed on the ground, usually as individuals. A range of invertebrate prey is taken, including insects such as cockroaches, beetles (both adults and larvae), earwigs, fly larvae, and the adults and larvae of moths. Other prey taken includes centipedes, spiders, and earthworms. Less commonly taken prey includes stick insects, bugs, amphipods, lizards, frogs, and occasionally seeds. They find food by scratching with their feet through the leaf litter.

Mixing and aerating soil and leaf litter while scratching for food amounts to a form of ecosystem engineering, or farming; foraging by superb lyrebirds has been shown to thus create microhabitats, which nurture larger and more abundant prey. This activity also improves forest health by burying potential wildfire fuel and by measurably increasing the diversity of invertebrates. Such positive effects cover millions of hectares of land.

=== Breeding ===
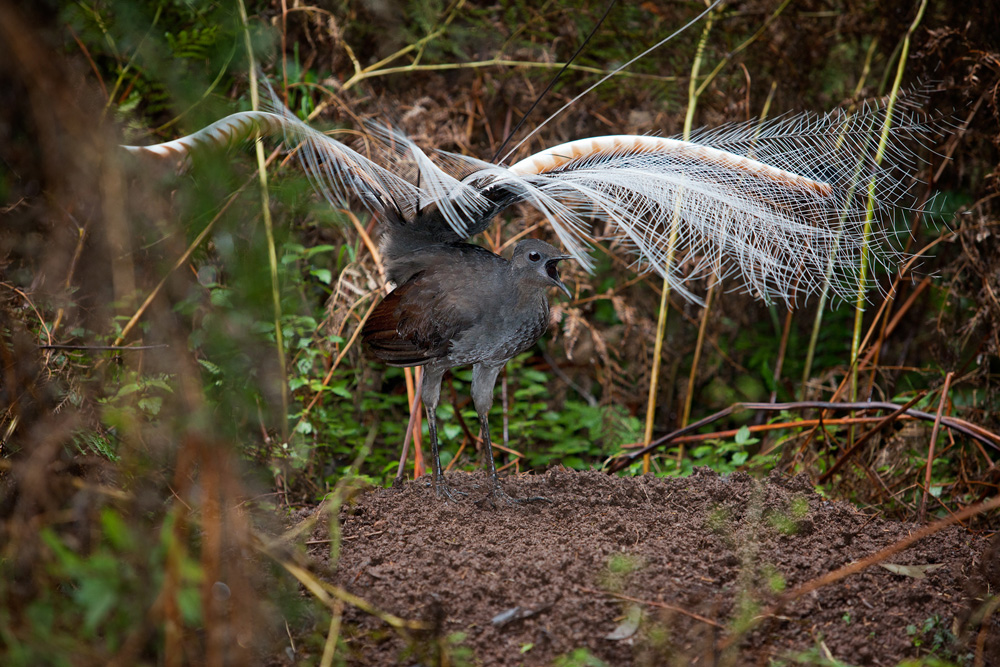
Superb lyrebird in courtship display

Lyrebirds live as long as 30 years. They have long breeding cycles and start breeding later in life than other passerine birds. Female superb lyrebirds start breeding at the age of five or six, and males at the age of six to eight. Males defend territories from other males, and those territories may contain the breeding territories of up to eight females. Within the male territories, the males create or use display platforms; for the superb lyrebird, this is a mound of bare soil; for the Albert's lyrebird, it is a pile of twigs on the forest floor.

Male lyrebirds call mostly during winter, when they construct and maintain an open arena-mound in dense bush, on which they sing and dance in an elaborate courtship display performed for potential mates, of which the male lyrebird has several. The strength, volume, and location of the nest built by the female lyrebird is dependent on the rainfall and predation during the nest-building period. The nest must be water resistant and hidden in secluded areas so predators cannot attack. Once the nest is made in the preferred location, the female lyrebird lays a single egg. The egg is incubated over 50 days solely by the female, and the female also fosters the chick alone.

=== Vocalizations and mimicry ===
Superb lyrebird mimicking Australian native birds

A lyrebird's song is one of the more distinctive aspects of its behavioural biology. Lyrebirds sing throughout the year, but the peak of the breeding season, from June to August, is when they sing with the most intensity. During this peak, males may sing for four hours of the day, almost half the hours of daylight. The song of the lyrebird is a mixture of elements of its own song and mimicry of other species. Lyrebirds render with great fidelity the individual songs of other birds and the chatter of flocks of birds, and also mimic other animals, such as possums, koalas, and dingoes. Lyrebirds have been recorded mimicking human sounds such as a mill whistle, a cross-cut saw, chainsaws, car engines and car alarms, fire alarms, rifle-shots, camera shutters, dogs barking, crying babies, music, mobile-phone ring tones, and even the human voice. While the mimicry of human noises is widely reported, the extent to which it happens is exaggerated. Parts of the lyrebird's own song can resemble human-made sound effects, which has given rise to the urban legend that they frequently imitate video game or film sounds.

The superb lyrebird's mimicked calls are learned from the local environment, including from other superb lyrebirds. An instructive example is the population of superb lyrebirds in Tasmania, which have retained the calls of species not native to Tasmania in their repertoire, with some local Tasmanian endemic bird songs added. The female lyrebirds of both species are also mimics capable of complex vocalisations. Superb lyrebird females are silent during courtship, but they regularly produce sophisticated vocal displays during foraging and nest defense. A recording of a superb lyrebird mimicking sounds of an electronic shooting game, workmen, and chainsaws was added to the National Film and Sound Archive's Sounds of Australia registry in 2013.

Both species of lyrebirds produce elaborate, lyrebird-specific vocalisations, including whistle songs. Males also sing songs specifically associated with their song-and-dance displays.

One researcher, Sydney Curtis, has recorded flute-like lyrebird calls in the vicinity of the New England National Park. Similarly, in 1969, a park ranger, Neville Fenton, recorded a lyrebird song that resembled flute sounds in the New England National Park, near Dorrigo in northern coastal New South Wales. After much detective work, Fenton discovered that in the 1930s, a flute player living on a farm adjoining the park used to play tunes near his pet lyrebird. The lyrebird adopted the tunes into his repertoire, and retained them after release into the park. Neville Fenton forwarded a tape of his recording to Norman Robinson. Because a lyrebird is able to carry two tunes at the same time, Robinson filtered out one of the tunes and put it on the phonograph for the purposes of analysis. One witness suggested that the song represents a modified version of two popular tunes in the 1930s: "The Keel Row" and "Mosquito's Dance". Musicologist David Rothenberg has endorsed this information. However, a "flute lyrebird" research group (including Curtis and Fenton) formed to investigate the veracity of this story found no evidence of "Mosquito Dance" and only remnants of "Keel Row" in contemporary and historical lyrebird recordings from this area. Neither was able to prove that a lyrebird chick had been a pet, although they acknowledged compelling evidence on both sides of the argument.

== Status and conservation ==
Until the 2019–2020 Australian bushfire season, superb lyrebirds were not considered threatened in the short to medium term. Concern has since grown, as early analyses have shown the extent of destruction of the lyrebird's preferred wet-forest habitats, which in less intense previous bushfire seasons have been spared, in large part due to their moisture content. Albert's lyrebird has a very restricted habitat and had been listed as vulnerable by the IUCN, but because the species and its habitat were carefully managed, the species was reassessed to near threatened in 2009. The superb lyrebird had already been seriously threatened by habitat destruction in the past. Its population had since recovered, but the 2019–2020 bushfires damaged much of its habitat, which may lead to a reclassification of its status from "common" to "threatened". Beyond this new threat are the long-term vulnerabilities to predation by cats and foxes, as well as human population pressure on its habitat.

== In culture ==
=== Painting by John Gould ===
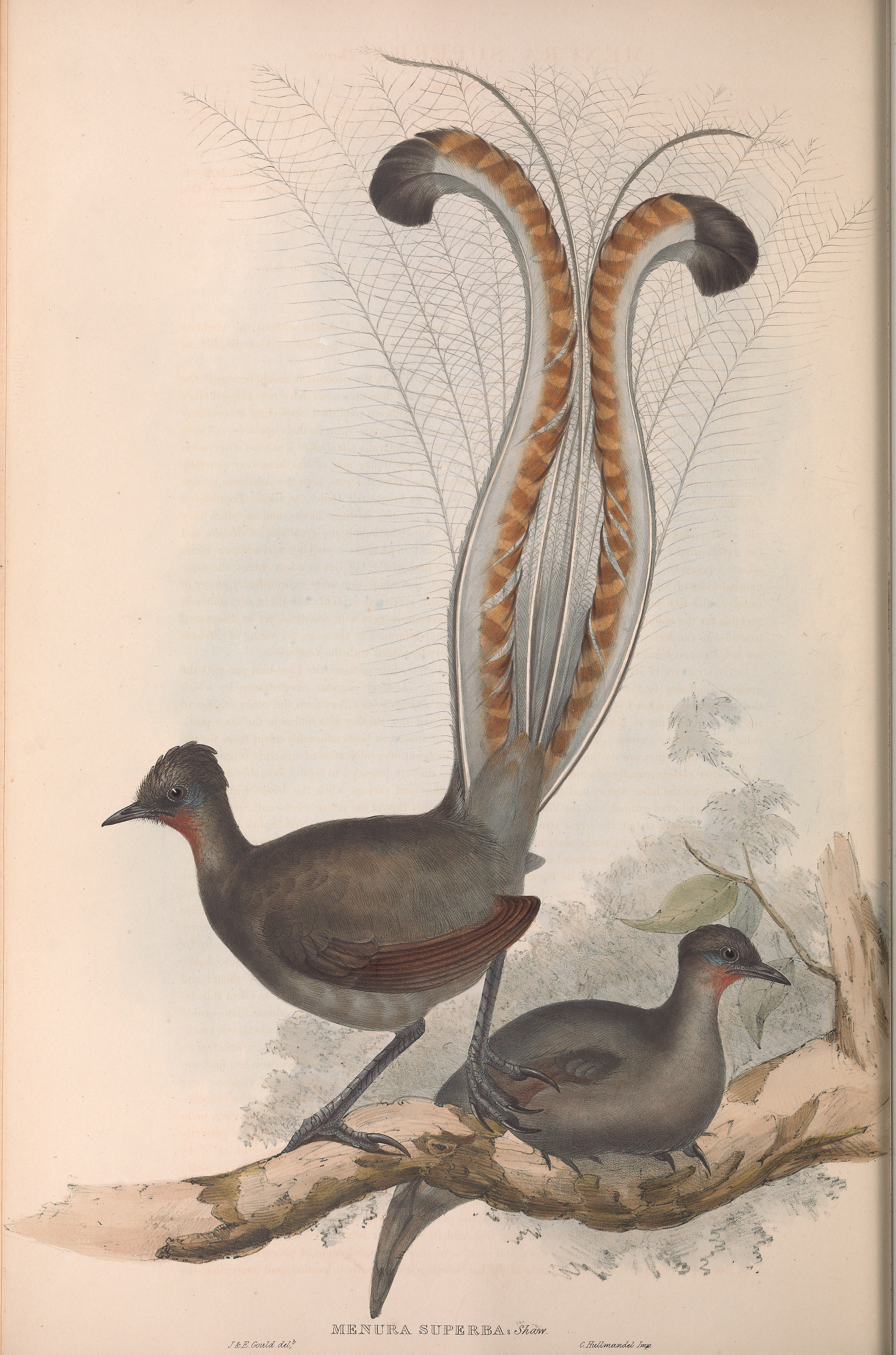
John Gould's early 1800s painting of a superb lyrebird specimen at the British Museum

The lyrebird is so called because the male bird has a spectacular tail, consisting of 16 highly modified feathers (two long, slender lyrates at the centre of the plume, two broader medians on the outside edges, and 12 filamentaries arrayed between them), which was originally thought to resemble a lyre. This happened when a superb lyrebird specimen (which had been taken from Australia to England during the early 19th century) was prepared for display at the British Museum by a taxidermist, who had never seen a live lyrebird. The taxidermist mistakenly thought that the tail would resemble a lyre, and that the tail would be held in a similar way to that of a peacock during courtship display, so he arranged the feathers in this way. Later, John Gould (who had also never seen a live lyrebird), painted the lyrebird from the British Museum specimen.

The male lyrebird's tail is not held as in John Gould's painting. Instead, the male lyrebird's tail is fanned over the lyrebird during courtship display, with the tail completely covering his head and back, as can be seen in the image in the "breeding" section of this page and also on the image of the 10-cent coin, where the superb lyrebird's tail (in courtship display) is portrayed accurately.

=== Lyrebird emblems and logos ===
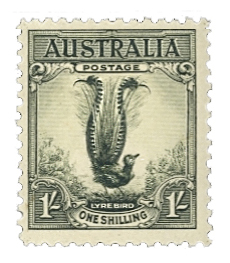
Superb lyrebird on a 1932 Australian postage stamp

The lyrebird has been featured as a symbol and emblem many times, especially in New South Wales and Victoria (where the superb lyrebird has its natural habitat) and in Queensland (where Albert's lyrebird has its natural habitat).

- Known as Wiritjiribin or Wiridjiribin (whee-ree-chee-ree-been), the lyrebird is the primary totem of the people of the Dharawal Nation and serves as a powerful symbol of peace, mediation, and reconciliation.
- A male superb lyrebird is featured on the reverse of the Australian 10-cent coin.
- A superb lyrebird featured on the Australian one-shilling postage stamp first issued in 1932.
- A stylised superb lyrebird appears in the transparent window of the Australian 100-dollar note.
- A silhouette of a male superb lyrebird is the logo of the Australian Film Commission.
- An illustration of a male superb lyrebird, in courtship display, is the emblem of the New South Wales National Parks and Wildlife Service.
- The pattern on the curtains of the Victorian State Theatre is the image of a male superb lyrebird, in courtship display, as viewed from the front.
- A stylised illustration of a male Albert's lyrebird was the logo of the Queensland Conservatorium of Music, before the it became part of Griffith University. In the logo, the top part of the lyrebird's tail became a music stave.
- Australian band You Am I's 2008 album Dilettantes and its first single, "Erasmus", feature a drawing of a lyrebird by artist Ken Taylor.
- A stylised illustration of part of a male superb lyrebird's tail is the logo for the Lyrebird Arts Council of Victoria.
- The lyrebird is also featured atop the crest of Panhellenic Sorority Alpha Chi Omega, whose symbol is the lyre.
- Many other companies have the name of Lyrebird and use lyrebird logos.
- "Land of the Lyrebird" is an alternative name for the Strzelecki Ranges in the Gippsland region of Victoria.
- A silhouetted male superb lyrebird in courtship display features in the masthead of The Betoota Advocate.

== See also ==
- The Display

== Further references ==
- Attenborough, D. (1998). The Life of Birds. p. 212. ISBN 0563-38792-0.
