= Sexual selection in birds =

Various types of avian mating rituals/behaviors found in nature

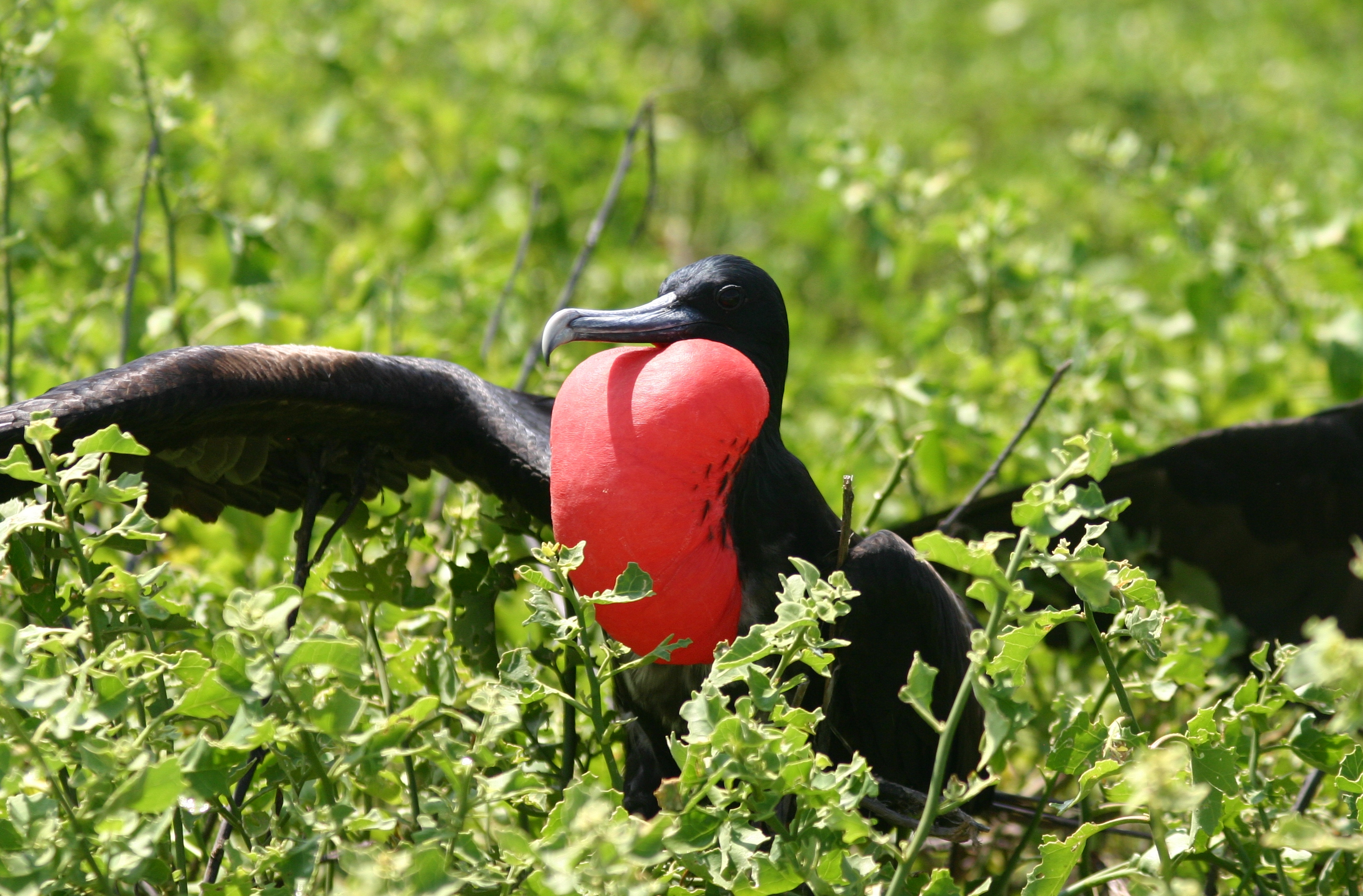
Male greater frigatebird displaying

Sexual selection in birds concerns how birds have evolved a variety of mating behaviors, with the peacock tail being perhaps the most famous example of sexual selection and the Fisherian runaway. Commonly occurring sexual dimorphisms such as size and color differences are energetically costly attributes that signal competitive breeding situations. Many types of avian sexual selection have been identified; intersexual selection, also known as female choice; and intrasexual competition, where individuals of the more abundant sex compete with each other for the privilege to mate. Sexually selected traits often evolve to become more pronounced in competitive breeding situations until the trait begins to limit the individual's fitness. Conflicts between an individual fitness and signaling adaptations ensure that sexually selected ornaments such as plumage coloration and courtship behavior are "honest" traits. Signals must be costly to ensure that only good-quality individuals can present these exaggerated sexual ornaments and behaviors.

Bird species often demonstrate intersexual selection, perhaps because – due to their lightweight body structures – fights between males may be ineffective or impractical. Therefore, male birds commonly use the following methods to try to seduce the females:

- Colour: Some species have ornate, diverse, and often colourful feathers.
- Song: Male birdsong provides an important way of protecting territory (intrasexual selection).
- Nest construction: In some species, males build nests that females subject to rigorous inspection, choosing the male that makes the most attractive nest.
- Dance: Males dance in front of females. Cranes provide a well-known example.

As a propagandist, the cock behaves as though he knew that it was as advantageous to impress the males as the females of his species, and a sprightly bearing with fine feathers and triumphant song are quite as well adapted for war-propaganda as for courtship. —Ronald Fisher, 1930

In some bird species, both the male and the female contribute a great deal to offspring-care. In these cases, the male and female will be continuously assessing each other based on sexual characteristics. In the blue-footed booby, the females tend to choose males with brighter blue feet, because birds with brighter feet are younger, and thus have greater fertility and ability to provide paternal care. When researchers put make-up on the males' feet to make them look duller after the laying of the first eggs, their mates consequently laid smaller second eggs, which shows that female boobies continuously evaluate their mates' reproductive value. Males also vary their behaviour based on the females' foot colour. Males mated to females with brighter feet are more willing to incubate their eggs.

== Acoustic signaling ==
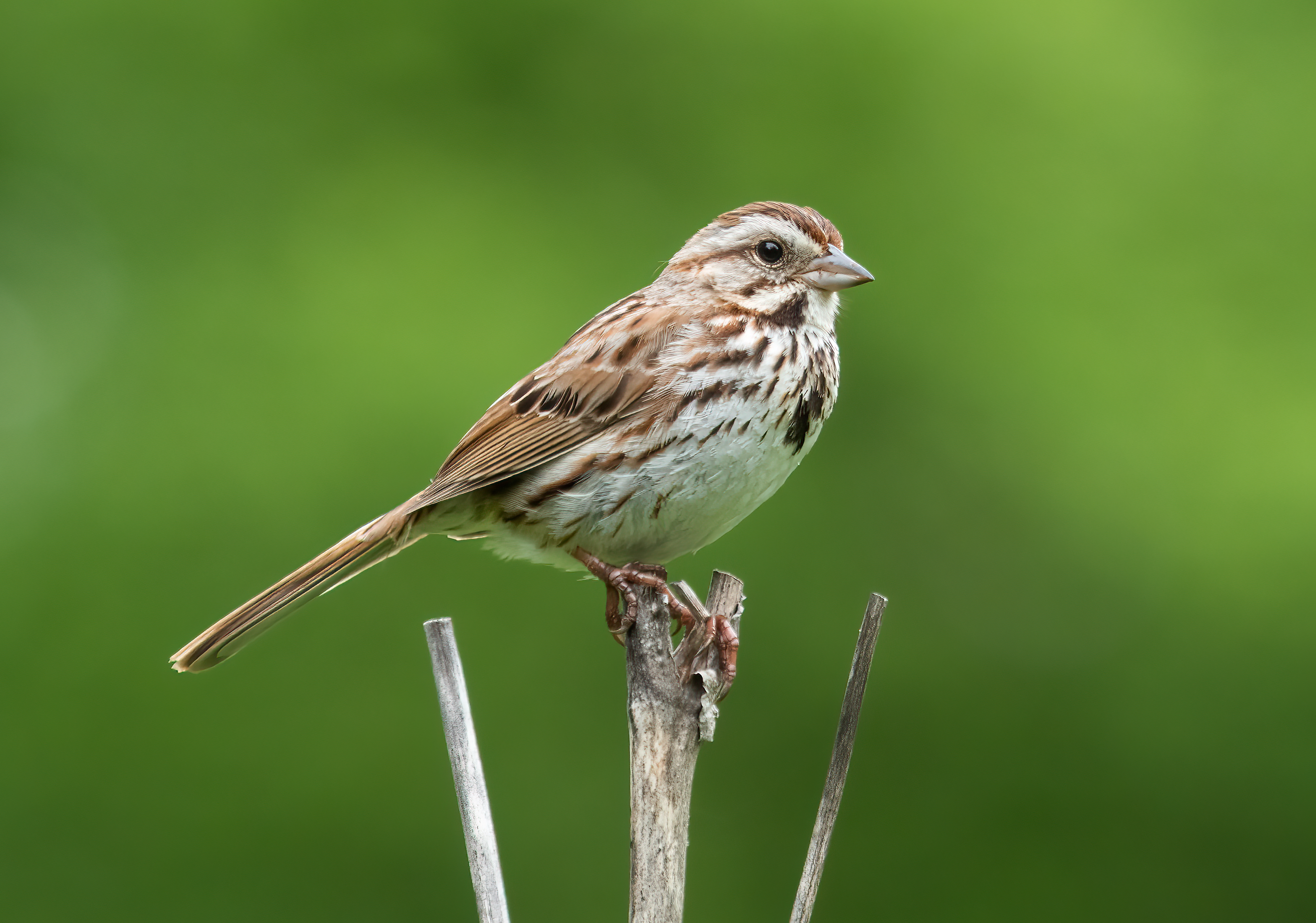
Song sparrow

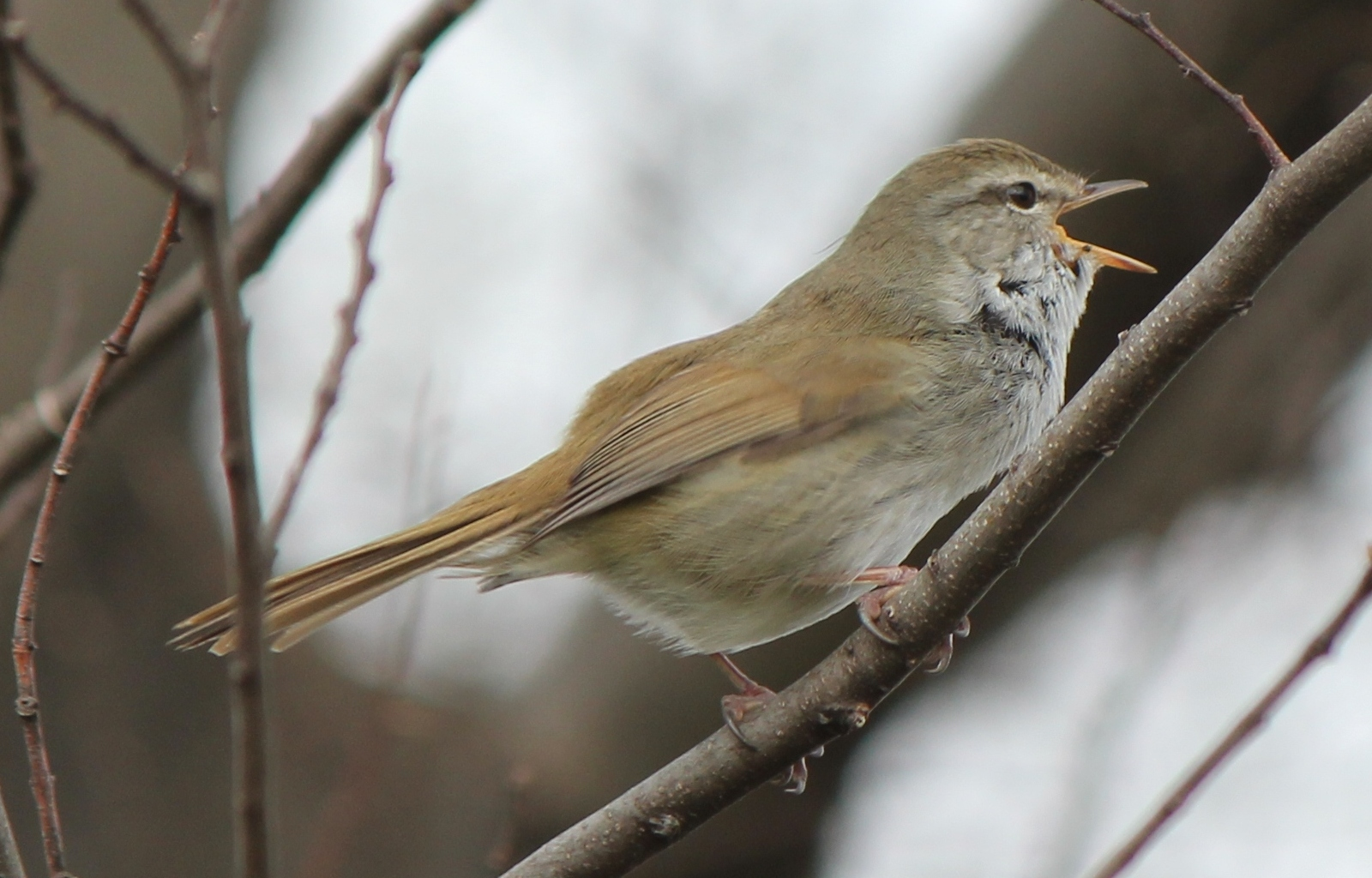
Japanese bush warbler

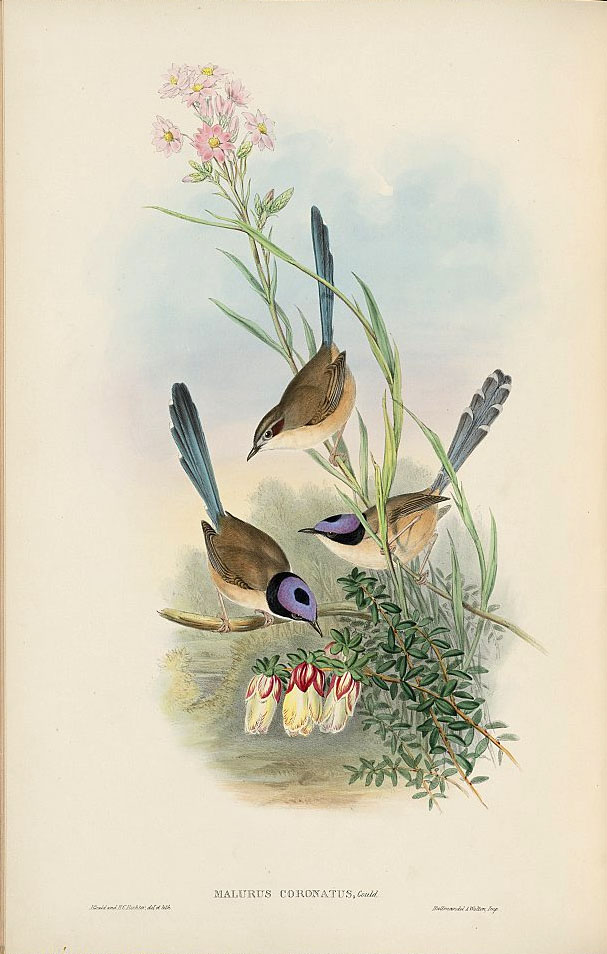
Purple-crowned fairywren

One of the most prominent forms of avian communication is by means of acoustic signals. These signals are widespread in avian species and are often used to attract mates. Different aspects and features of bird song such as structure, amplitude and frequency have evolved as a result of sexual selection.

Large song repertoires are preferred by females of many avian species. One hypothesis for this is that song repertoire is positively correlated with the size of the brain's song control nucleus (HVC). A large HVC would indicate developmental success. In song sparrows, males with large repertoires had larger HVCs, better body condition and lower heterophil-to-lymphocyte ratios indicating better immune health. This supports the idea that song sparrows with large song repertoires have better lifetime fitness and that song repertoires are honest indicators of the males "quality." Possible explanations for this adaptation include direct benefits to the female, such as superior parental care or territory defense, and indirect benefits, such as good genes for their offspring.

Japanese bush warbler songs from island populations have an acoustically simple structure when compared to mainland populations. Song complexity is correlated with higher levels of sexual selection in mainland populations, showing that a more complex song structure is advantageous in an environment with high levels of sexual selection. Another example is in purple-crowned fairywrens; larger males of this species sing advertising songs at a lower frequency than smaller rival males. Since body size is a characteristic of good health, lower frequency calls are a form of honest signaling. Negative correlation between body size and call frequency is supported across multiple species within the taxa. In the rock sparrow, song frequency is positively associated with reproductive success. Slower song rate is associated with age and is preferred by females. Reproductive status of the individual is communicated through higher maximum frequency. There was also positive correlation between age and extra-pair copulation frequency.

Bird calls are also known to continue after pair formation in several socially monogamous bird species. In one experimental population of zebra finches, there was increased singing activity by the male after breeding. This increase is positively correlated with the partner's reproductive investment. The female finches were bred in cages with two subsequent males that differed with varying amounts of song output. Females produced larger eggs with more orange yolks when paired with a male with a high song output. This suggests that the relative amount of song production in paired zebra finch males might function to stimulate the partner rather than to attract extra-pair females.

== Visual signaling ==
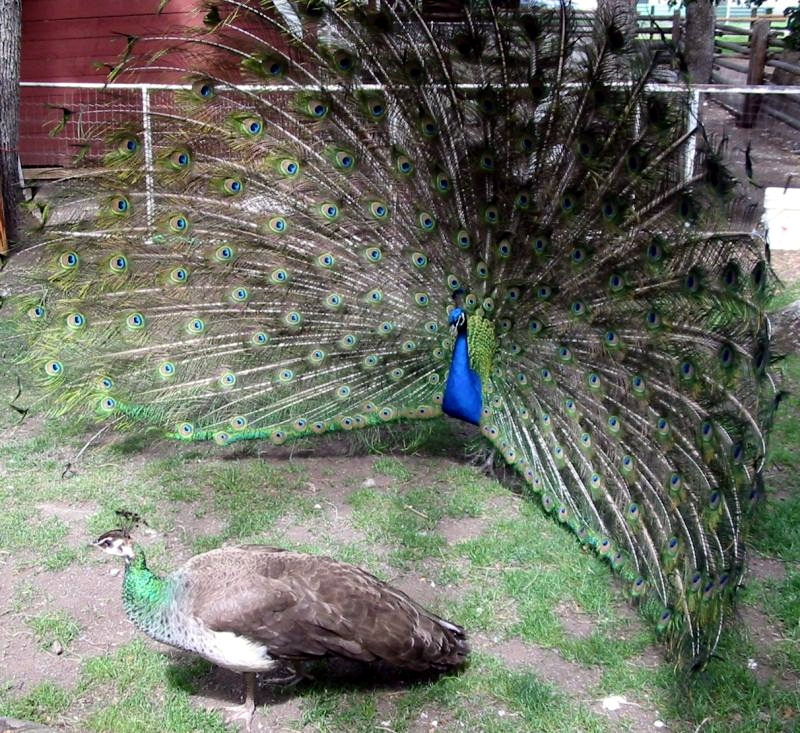
Peacock courting peahen

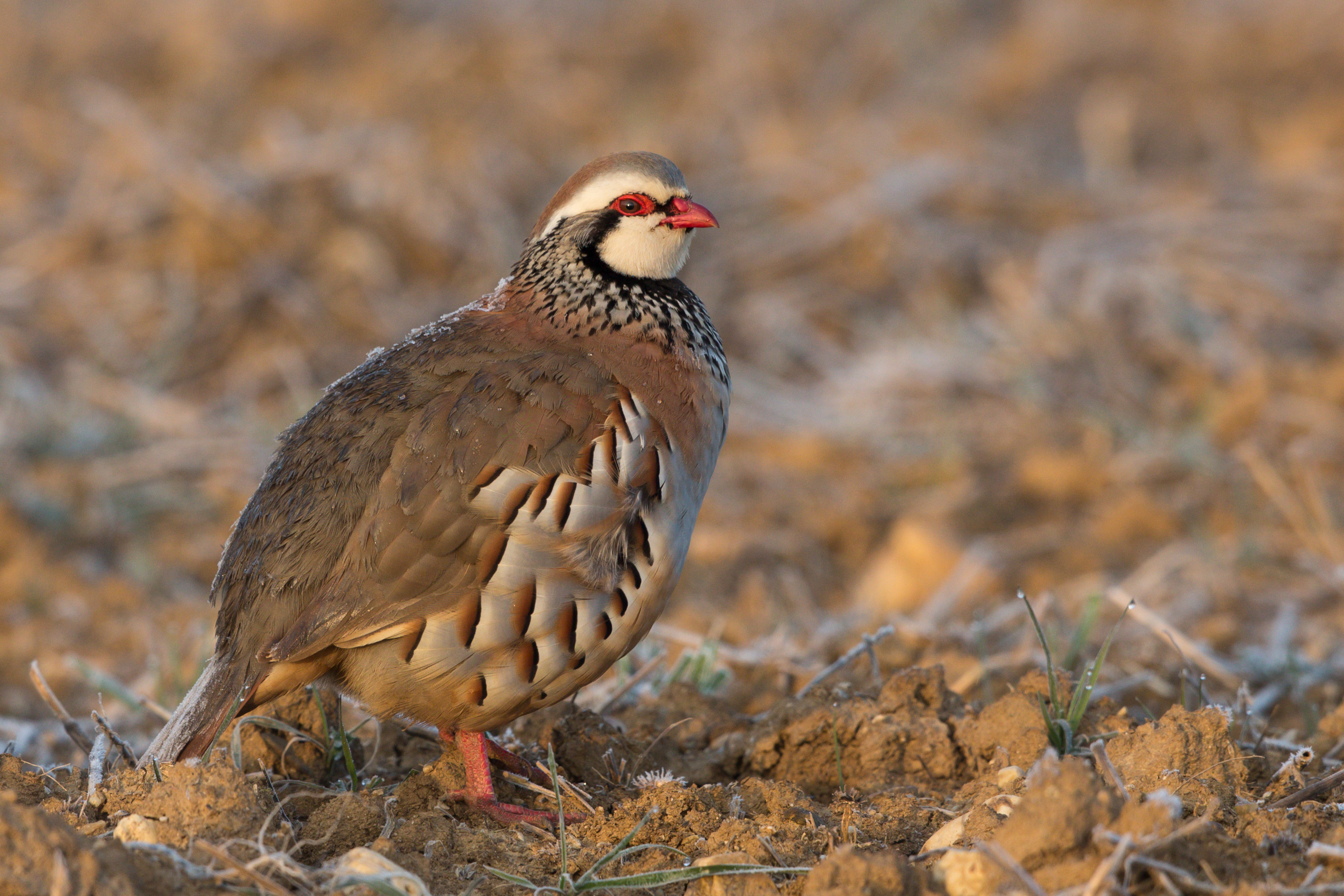
Red-legged partridge

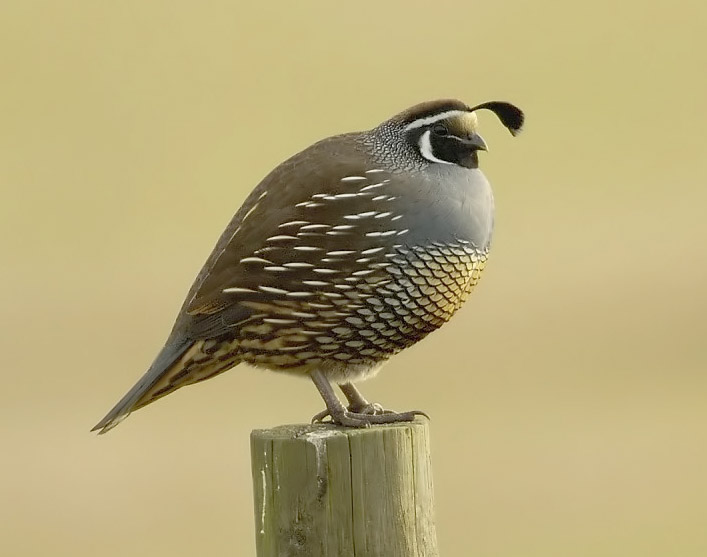
California quail

Birds also use visual stimuli such as bright colors or large ornamentation for socio-sexual communication as well as species recognition. These ornaments can be considered "honest" signs of fitness because they are often costly to produce and show that the individual is healthy enough to mate with the choosing female.

The peacock's plumage shows intersexual selection, where ornate males compete to be chosen by females. The result is a stunning feathered display, which is large and unwieldy enough to pose a significant survival disadvantage, demonstrating the handicap principle, and possibly provide a means of demonstrating body symmetry, such that peahens are "trying" to discover the health of the male or the fitness of his genes. Diseases, injuries, and genetic disorders may impair the body's symmetry and the tail.

In experiments where eyespots are removed from their tail feathers, also known as trains, there is a significant decline in mating success compared with a control group. This supports the hypothesis that the train elaboration evolved, at least in part, as a result of female choice. The most common explanation for this adaptation is that the females gain indirect benefits such as good genes for their offspring. Peafowl are lekking species and males provide no care to their offspring, therefore females do not gain any direct benefits from mating with a more elaborate male. However, conflicting evidence has been found that removal of a large number of eyespots (≤20) from a male's train does reduce his mating success, although this is outside the natural variation of eyespot loss. This shows that peafowl preference is more complex than originally thought. Takahashi et al., 2008, found no evidence that peahens expressed any preference for males with more elaborate trains. This shows that trains are not the universal target for female choice due to their small variance among males across populations. A peacock's train is also not a reliable indicator of the individual's condition. Although the train may be necessary for mating success, the females seem to be more affected by the males' behavioral characteristics during courtship.

In great bustards, age, weight, and display effort are all significant and independent predictors of male mating success, where whiskers and neck plumage are reliable indicators of male age and weight. A male's sexual display consists of a series of extravagant body postures and movements that end, when an interested female approaches, with a reiterative and almost obstinate exhibition of the cloaca, which is fully surrounded by pure white feathers that allow an easy detection of possible parasites or their remains. Exposure of the cloaca is widespread in pre-copulatory displays of birds and has been related with high probability of transmission of sexual diseases. Male great bustards may use the highly toxic cantharidin taken from blister beetles of the genus Meloe to clean their intestine and cloaca plumage from parasites. Cantharidin can kill a great bustard if many beetles are ingested. Self-medication could have evolved in great bustards as a sexual selection mechanism capable of transmitting to females a signal of good resistance to a poisonous compound, in a similar way as other costly secondary sexual traits are exhibited by males of many species. Great bustards may eat toxic blister beetles of the genus Meloe to increase the sexual arousal of males.

In parrots, ornate males with brighter plumage are preferred by the females. These males are typically immunologically superior with higher leukocyte counts. This evidence supports the idea that bright plumage is an "honest" signal involved in mating. The female California quail uses multiple male plumage characteristics when deciding on a mate and responds in different ways to a variety of artificially manipulated traits. Various visual signals act in combination to attract a mate and female choice will shift toward several particularly exaggerated traits. In the red-legged partridge, male carotenoid ornamentation is positively correlated with relative reproductive investment of the female. This species has variable egg laying capacity and females who mated with color-enhanced males produced a larger quantity of eggs in less time than controls. The eggs produced were of similar quality in both cases showing that the females can adjust laying capacity based on the apparent carotenoid-based ornamentation of its mate.

Cosmetic coloration is another mechanism by which male birds use to try to attract a mate. Cosmetic coloration involves brightening of a birds feathers, thus making it more attractive to females. Cosmetic coloration has two different types. The first is a type is when substances are produced by the bird itself such as uropygial gland secretions, skin secretions, and powder. The second kind are substances that the bird acquires from the environment such as soil or vegetal matter contained in carcass viscera and fresh vegetation. The first type of coloration, whereby the animal produces the substances for coloration, is directed by secretions of the uropygial gland. This gland secretes waxes and oils that make feathers appear glossier which causes an increase in brightness. The feathers coated with the preen oils look brighter and the degree to which the plumage was glossy was a way in which mates could determine the diet or overall health of the individual. The uropygial gland also can change the shape of the reflected light off the feathers, which alters what wavelengths of light are reflected. The secretions of the gland illustrate how this coloration is cosmetic. For example, species of hornbill produce colored gland secretions that they apply to their plumage, thereby changing the color of their feathers. Only sexually mature birds develop the coloration, which would lead to the inference that these secretions have something to do with the sexual activity of the birds. Another example is in the greater flamingo (Phoenicopterus roseus). This study found that the flamingo applied these carotenoid rich secretions from the uropygial gland on its plumage and the resulting cosmetic coloration may influence mate choice. This data is supported by the findings that application of the oils was more frequent during periods where the flamingos were displaying for mates and the presence of the cosmetic coloration decreased after egg hatching, indicating that the coloration has the function of finding mates but it is not of use after a mate has been found. A last example is in the house finch where they found that preen waxes on feathers acted as cosmetics and that the waxes increased the signal content of feather traits. The signal content correlated to the condition of the individual and increased the signaling value to mates, and therefore affected mate choice, implying that cosmetic coloration has some effect on sexual selection. These carotenoid pigments have been seen in multiple families of birds and have been traced back Cenozoic era, indicating that these pigments have a strong evolutionary benefit to the individual. The second type of coloration that also involves gland secretions is with powder feathers. Powder feathers are modified feathers that disintegrate into a fine powder. These powder feathers are found on pigeons, parrots, and herons. Herons provide a great example of how cosmetic coloration is related to mate choice and sexual selection. In the whistling heron, they develop a yellowish color on their neck, stomach, and tail due to the powder feathers. The coloration due to the powder is more intense during breeding season. In bustards, males use a red powder during courtship displays to attract mates and then the powder fades after the display. These examples show how these modifications to feathers can affect mate choice. The last kind of cosmetic coloration is when external substances are used to color the feathers, such as dirt. In bearded vultures, individuals will bath in mud and the degree to which the mud stains the feathers is seen as a sign of dominance. This sign of dominance could then affect mate choice.

Nest building is another way that birds can visually signal their fitness without the need for plumage ornamentation. Eurasian wren males build multiple nests in their territory to display to females. A large number of complete but unoccupied nests gives the males a reproductive advantage. Most of these nests are never used and appear to be completely ornamental.

== Olfactory signaling ==
Avian olfactory signals are often overlooked as a form of communication. They possess developed olfactory apparatuses similar in function and structure to other vertebrates that are known to communicate chemically. Several species of birds have been found to discriminate sex using olfactory cues alone. In the spotless starling, it was found that individuals are able to identify the sex of conspecifics, or members of the same species, using the scent produced by the uropygial gland secretion. Uropygial secretion composition is known to differ among individuals. This evidence was supported by another study using a different species, the dark-eyed junco, showing that sex recognition by olfaction may be widespread in the taxa. It was found that the juncos were able to identify the sex of conspecifics as well as body size.

Specific odors in crested auklets are directly related to courtship behavior. This species will preferentially orient to a specific tangerine-scented plumage odor during mechanistic courtship behavior that involves the smelling of the scented neck region.

== Courtship displays ==
Several species of birds are also known to combine visual and auditory stimuli in their elaborate courtship displays. The combination of song and dance to create a complex courtship display is favored by sexual selection, with females assessing the male's ability to perform a well-choreographed display. Superb lyrebirds and long-tailed manakins give elaborate displays involving vocal and non-vocal sound production as well as visual displays.

Male bowerbirds build elaborately decorated structures called bowers to attract mates. Bowers are hut or tower-like structures that are often decorated with sticks, fruits, flowers and stones. The Vogelkop bowerbird, a species of bowerbird with the least plumage ornamentation (males and females are nearly identical) builds the most elaborately decorated bowers. This correlation shows that the female attention has changed from that of body ornamentation to that of bower complexity.

Acrobatic aerial displays are another behavior that is used to advertise fitness to potential mates. In species that frequently use aerial displays as a means of courtship behavior, the smaller, more agile males are selected for. In the case of the dunlin, display rate, as well as the proportion of time spent in aerial display, is negatively correlated with male body size. This is one of the few courtship behaviors that lead to smaller males being selected for.

== Dominance status ==
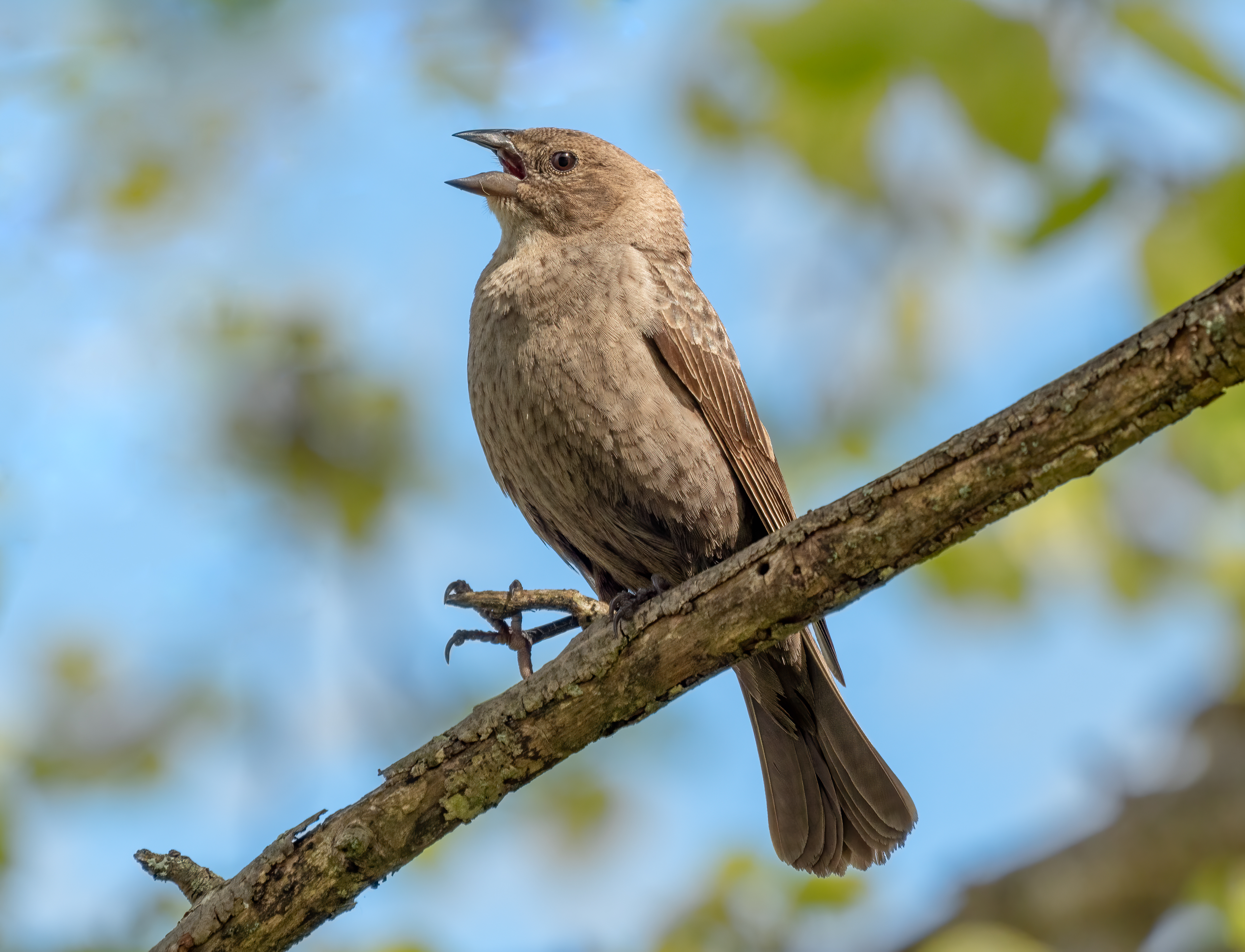
Brown-headed cowbird

In brown-headed cowbirds male displays were less intense when directed toward females than when directed to other males. The intense displays between males are most likely used to demonstrate condition and dominance status, and sometimes these displays escalate into physical fights in which the less dominant male is injured or killed. This is an example of when intrasexual competition requires more energy than the attraction of a mate.

Visual stimuli are also used in male-male competition. In rock sparrows, elaborate feather ornamentations are the best predictor of dominance in foraging groups. It has been shown, through the use of social network analysis to determine patterns of leader-follower interactions, that individuals with the brightest yellow breast patches showed the most dominance in the foraging group and had the most followers compared to less elaborate individuals.

Several sexually selected ornaments that may be used during courtship can also be used as armaments. Antbird songs, which are sexually monomorphic ornaments, function as deterrents in competitive intrasexual interactions as well as in mate choice. In several species of Hypocnemis antbirds, acoustic signals function in both intrasexual competition and mate choice. Removal experiments were performed to determine which function takes precedence. Both sexes use song as both ornament and as a form of competition; however, males demonstrate stronger signaling in both cases than females, giving more frequent signals and stronger responses.

== Territorial behavior ==
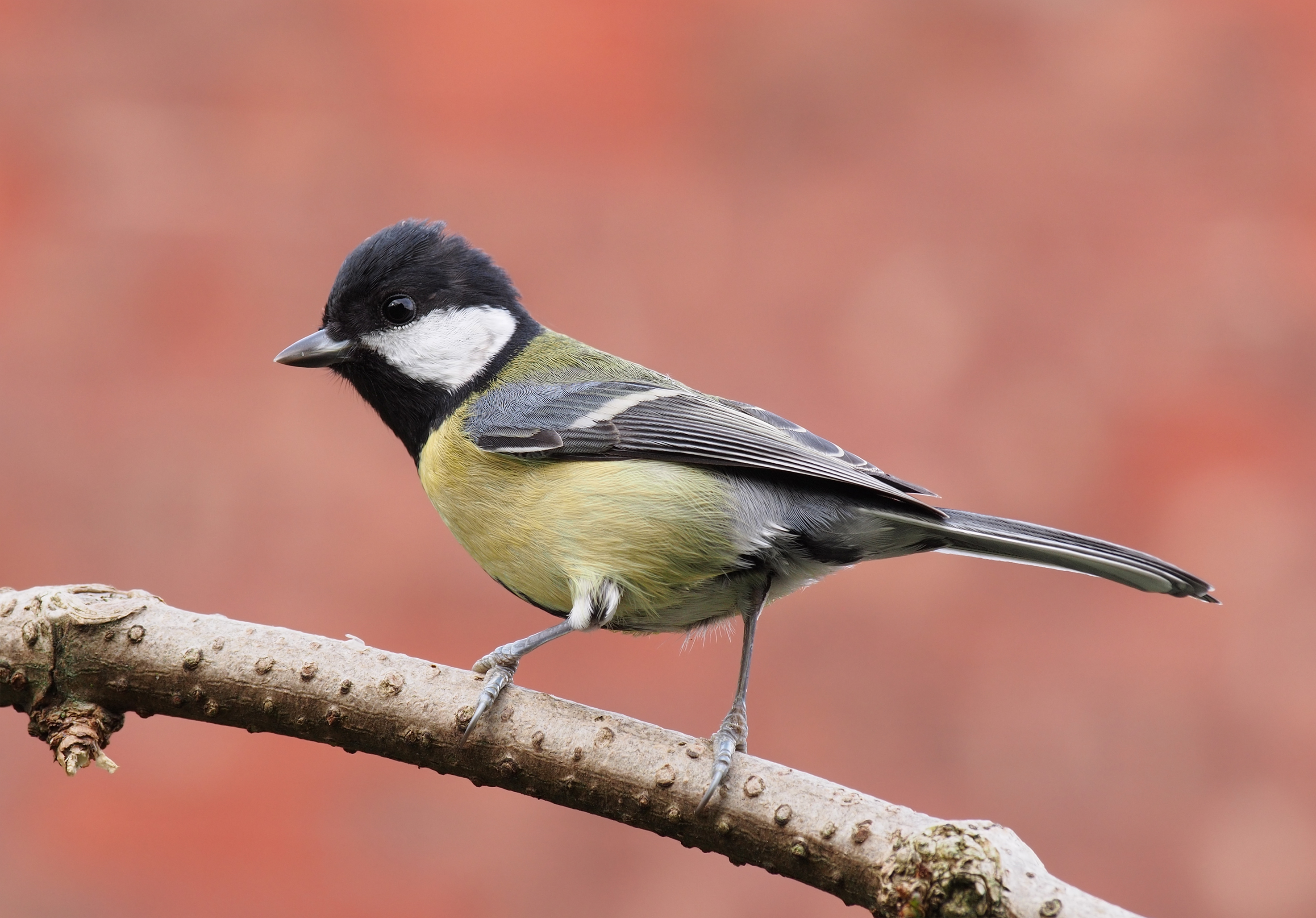
Great tit

Before and after social pairing and mating occurs, bird song is mainly dedicated to territorial defense. This behavior is a sexually selected trait because it ensures defense of the female who is rearing her offspring. There is also some evidence that vocal amplitude effects male-male competition in such species as the great tit. Most courtship songs were performed at relatively low amplitudes, whereas territorial songs or "broadcast songs" were performed at high amplitudes. This suggests an environment where it is necessary to devote more energy to territory defense than to attracting a mate.

Performance level of territory defense song is important in the context of sexual selection. By manipulating the territory defense song of the banded wren to simulate three levels of song performance, birds were much less likely to approach the high performance recording than the medium or low performance stimuli. Also, low performance stimuli were challenged without any further assessment.

== Sperm competition ==
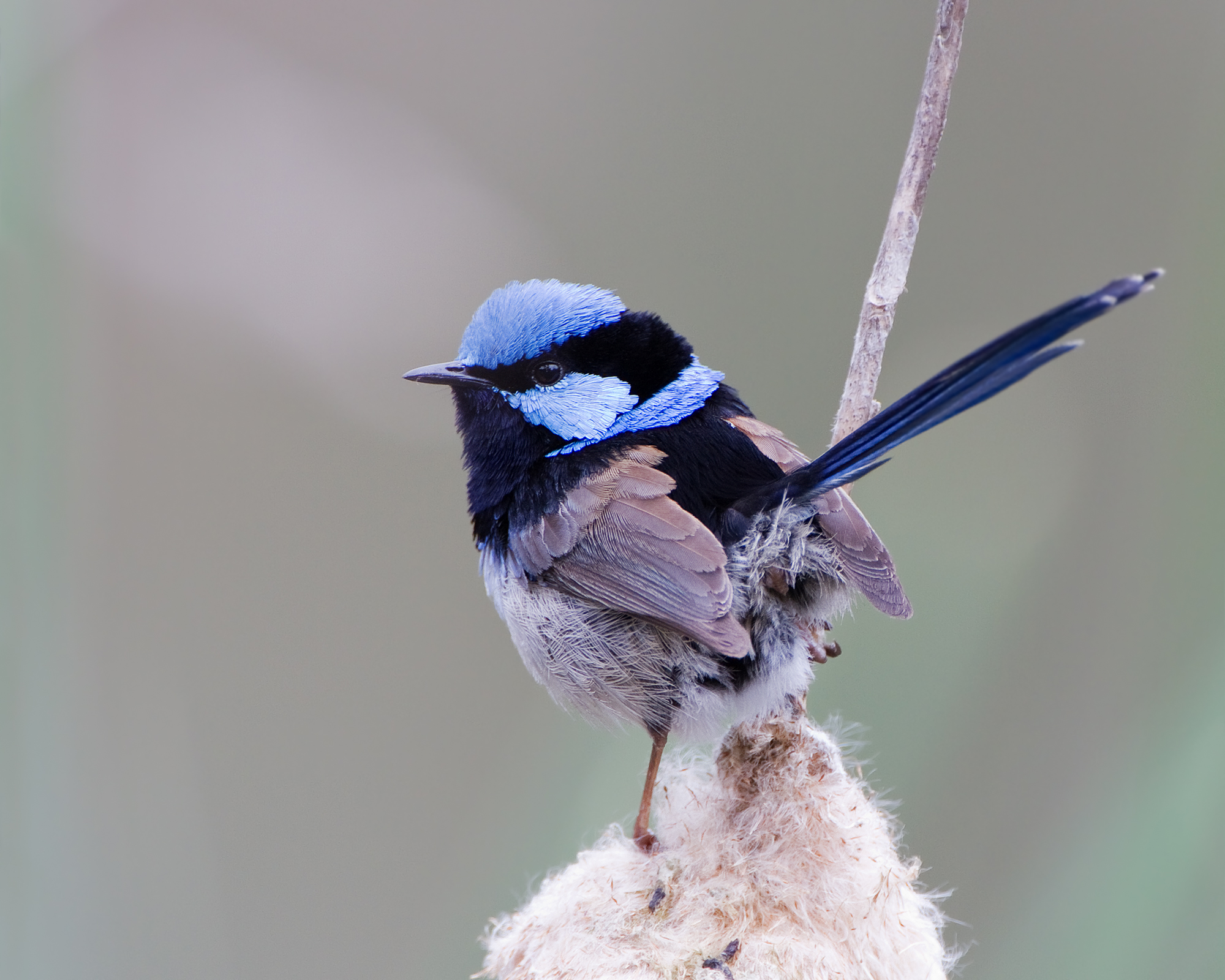
Male superb fairywren in breeding plumage

Post-copulatory sexual selection is one of the main factors that drives the evolution of sperm morphology and ultimately its relative ability to fertilize an egg after copulation has occurred. Sperm competition occurs when a female is inseminated by multiple males during one breeding season resulting in differential fertilization success among males. In birds, the last male to inseminate the female usually fertilizes the highest proportion of eggs because by the time fertilization occurs, the oldest spermatozoa have been lost. This is known as last male sperm precedence. The best strategy for increasing the likelihood of extra pair fertilization is to time the copulation close to the onset of female oviposition.

Many male adaptations, both offensive and defensive, have been selected for due to this phenomenon in a variety of avian species. Some offensive adaptations include variable sperm morphology, testes size as well as strategies to evade mate guarding. Morphological sperm traits such as flagellum, head and mid-piece length have been studied in several species of passerine birds to determine phenotypic correlations across species. There is large variation of sperm length in passerine birds. Total sperm length can vary from 50 to 300 μm. Several females of passerine species store sperm up to several weeks between insemination and fertilization. This has driven the evolution of sperm that is able to survive for longer periods of time. In these species, sperm with longer flagella, despite their ability to swim faster do not increase fertilization success because they require more energy and cause a shorter sperm lifespan. In the superb fairywren, a socially monogamous species with a high frequency of extra pair copulations, the relative amount of extra-pair paternity was greater in individuals that had sperm with a shorter flagellum and a larger head. The males with longer flagella and smaller heads had higher within-pair paternity. Shorter sperm with large heads are more able to withstand long durations of storage whereas the opposite phenotype was better at outcompeting previously stored sperm.

Since fertilization chances for an individual male are proportional to the amount of sperm simultaneously transferred into a female, the size of the testes and resulting production of sperm increases in situations with high intrasexual competition. There is a negative correlation between testis size and variation in mate guarding behavior. In several species of the Australian Maluridae, as the competition level of sperm increases, testicular spermatogenic tissue also increases proportionately. This suggests that sperm competition selects for greater sperm production per unit volume of testicular tissue. The proportion of motile sperm in ejaculates was also greater in species that had the highest intrasexual competition.

== Mate guarding ==
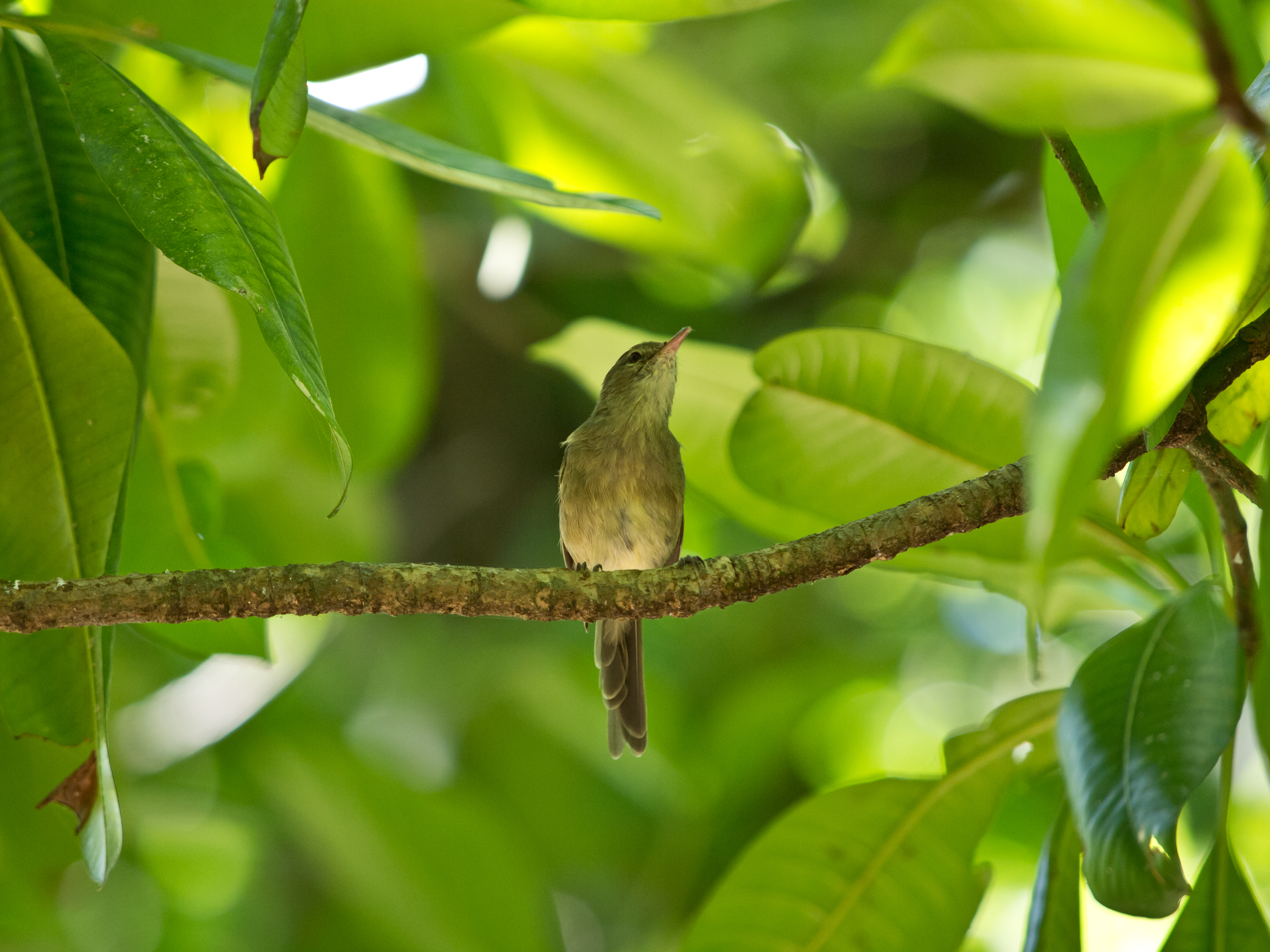
Seychelles warbler

Mate guarding is a common defensive post-copulatory behavior in birds. It is a behavior in which males attempt to prevent cuckoldry. Males that exhibit higher levels of mate guarding behavior have a higher chance of paternity following copulation. One mate guarding method is by following their fertilized female to prevent any extra-pair copulations which could decrease that particular male's chance of paternity. This is not very feasible in most cases due to the inability of the couple to always stay together. Another form of mate guarding which is more common is for the male to increase in-pair copulations by increasing the females store of spermatozoa and further increasing his likelihood of paternity. Mate guarding is energetically costly and can be adjusted based on the risk of cuckoldry as seen in the Seychelles warbler. Mate guarding behavior is negatively correlated with foraging behavior and body condition. An increase in the number of males in an environment led to a subsequent increase in the mate guarding behavior. Adaptations of males to overcome mate guarding have also evolved. One of these adaptations being sneaky behavior, or strategies that let males get close to paired females without detection from the other male.
