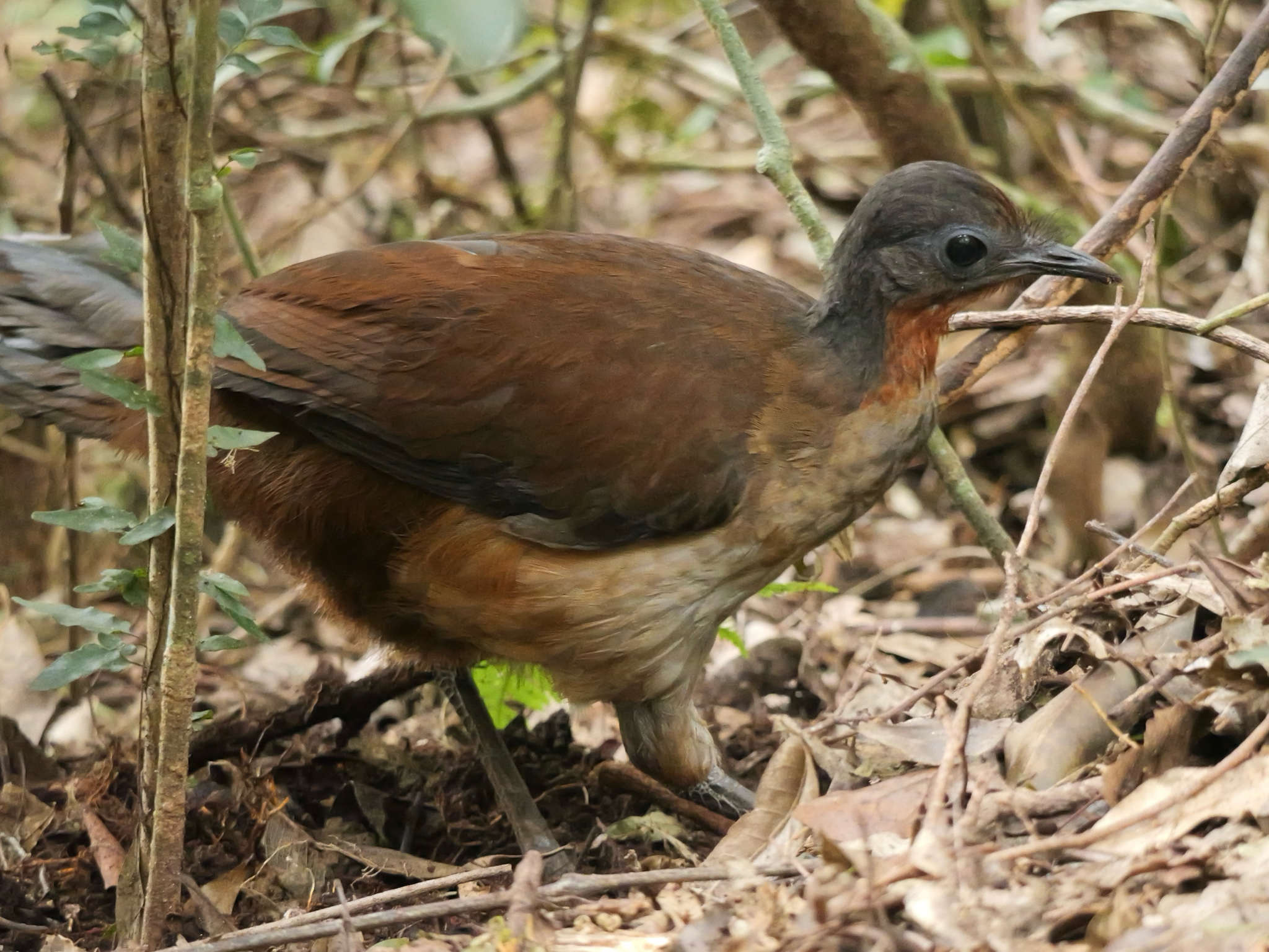
- Albert's lyrebird in Lamington National Park

Conservation status
- Least Concern (IUCN 3.1)

Scientific classification
- Kingdom: Animalia
- Phylum: Chordata
- Class: Aves
- Order: Passeriformes
- Family: Menuridae
- Genus: Menura
- Species: M. alberti

Binomial name
- Menura alberti Bonaparte, 1850
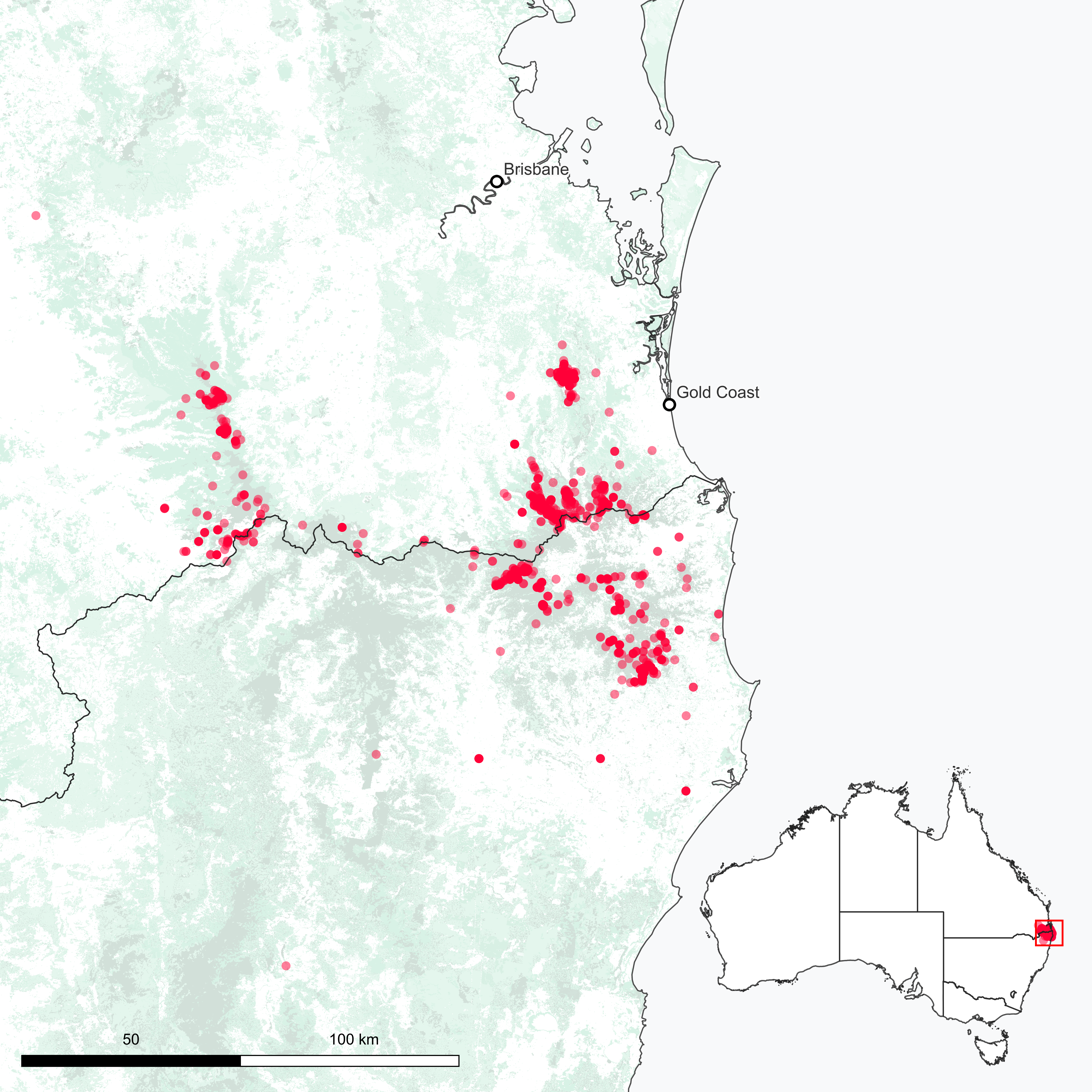
- Species distribution

= Albert's lyrebird =

Species of bird

Albert's lyrebird (Menura alberti), sometimes known as the northern lyrebird, is a timid, pheasant-sized songbird which is endemic to subtropical rainforests of Australia, in a small area on the state border between New South Wales and Queensland. The rarer of the two species of lyrebirds, Albert's lyrebird is named after Prince Albert, the prince consort of Queen Victoria, queen of the United Kingdom. It lacks the elegant lyre-shaped tail feathers of the superb lyrebird and is found in a much more restricted range.

The total population of Albert's lyrebirds was estimated at only 3,500 breeding birds in 2000, with one of the smallest distributional ranges of any bird on the continent.

== Naming ==
Due to its remote habitat, Menura alberti had not been discovered when famous English ornithologist John Gould first published his Birds of Australia in 1848, although he named it (after Prince Albert) and added it in a supplement in 1850. Under taxonomic convention, he would normally have been assigned the credit for describing the species and assigning its scientific name. However, the credit as scientific describer instead went to French naturalist Charles Lucien Bonaparte, nephew of Napoleon, who made reference to Gould's description of the new species before the publication of the supplement in 1850. So on this technicality, he was credited for describing it.

The first man to have shot one of the birds (in 1844) was amateur naturalist Augustus Adolphus Leycester, who also claimed to have found and sent an egg of the bird to London before Gould. However at this time he had not realised that it was a new species, assuming that it was the similar species M. superba (superb lyrebird). Lycester informally named the bird "small lyrebird", "Prince Albert's Lyrebird", and "Richmond River Lyrebird" (the latter for the area in which he found it, Richmond River in northern New South Wales,. and said that the Aboriginal name for the bird was "Calwin". Leycester, who had recently settled on Tunstall Station in the location now known as Tuncester, wrote in 1880 that he had sent a description of the habits of menura alberti to Gould.

== Description ==
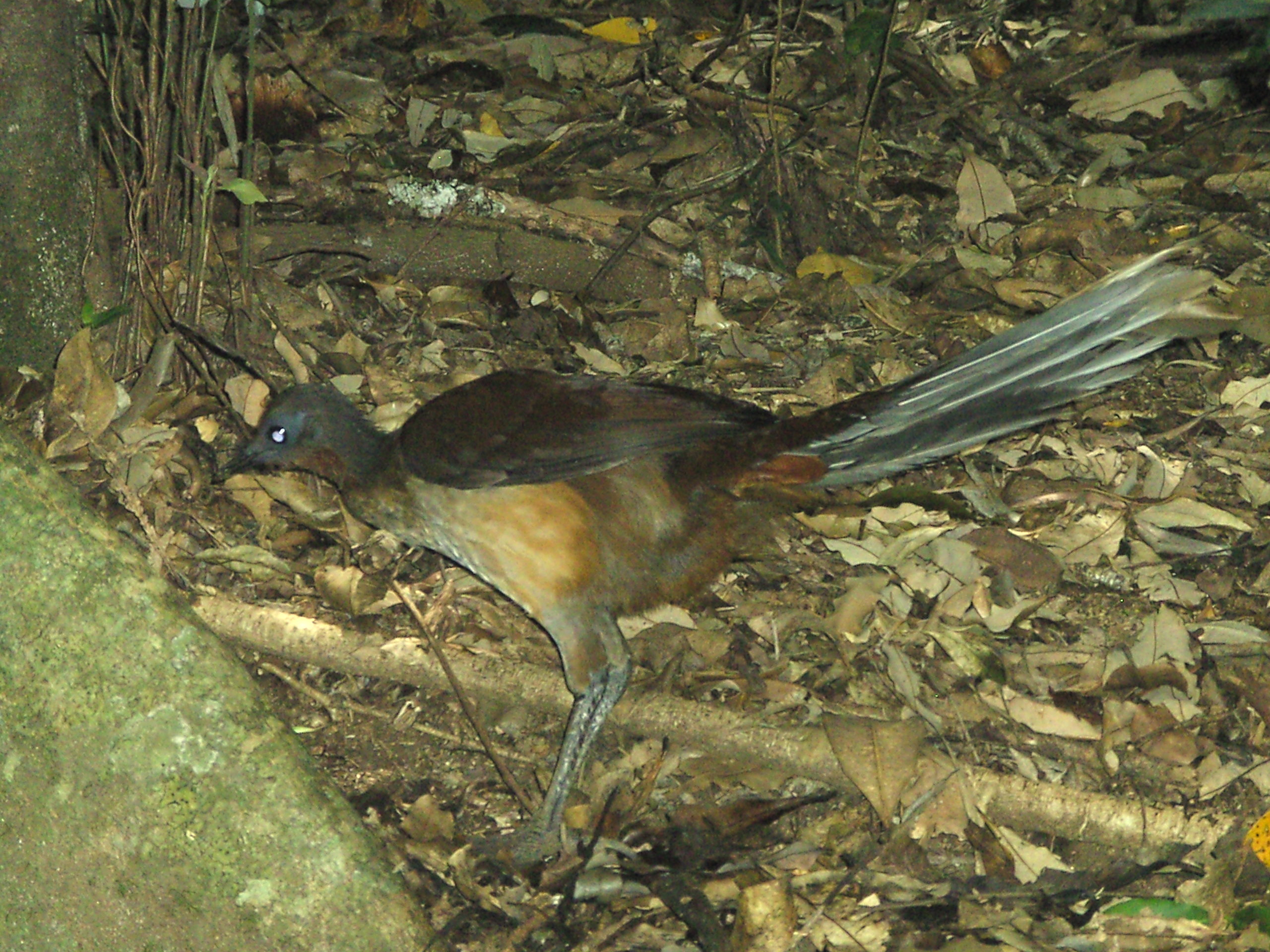
Female, Mount Warning, New South Wales

Albert's lyrebird is a ground-dwelling bird. Females reach approximately 75 cm (30 in) in length and males reach about 90 cm (35 in). They have a wingspan of 76–79 cm (30–31 in) and weigh about 930 g (33 oz). They are chestnut-brown in colour with a rufous undertail, rump, and throat. The bill is black; the iris dark brown or black, and it has a broad, blue-grey ring around the eye. The legs and feet are brownish grey to dark grey or black.

The sexes are alike except for the shape of the tail. The male has a spectacular tail composed of: (1) a central pair of long ribbon-like dark-brown median plumes; (2) six pairs of long, filmy and luxuriant filamentary feathers, which are black-brown above and dark grey below; and (3) a long broad fully webbed outermost pair of lyrates, which are black-brown above and dark grey below.

The tail of the female is shorter, simpler, slightly drooping and appears more pointed when closed; it is composed of a pair of long, narrow and tapered median plumes, and fully webbed, broad, brown feathers with rounded tips, but lacks filamentaries. When walking, the male carries its tail in an upward-curving train.

Juveniles are separable from adults at close range. They are similar to the adult female, but can be distinguished by: (1) the richer and more uniform rufous-brown colouring on the chin, throat and foreneck, and brighter red-brown wash on the forehead and forecrown; (2) the slightly paler upperbody; (3) the softer, downy texture of the rump, lower belly and vent feathers; and, most importantly, (4) the tail feathers (excluding the central pair of medians) are distinctly narrower, more tapered and pointed.

== Voice ==
Both this species and the superb lyrebird have powerful, flexible voices and use a mixture of their own calls and mimicry of other species in long unbroken passages of song. In comparison to the superb lyrebird, the Albert's lyrebird limits its mimicry to a smaller range of species, with the green catbird and satin bowerbird featuring strongly in its imitations, as well as whipbirds and rosellas.

The voice can create sounds at one moment deep and resonant, switch to high thin squeaks and trills, then change again to harsh noises. Some of the passages of song begin with a soft, mellow sound that rises clearer and louder, which has been likened to the howl of a dingo. The Albert's lyrebird's own song shows geographic variation, and different populations can be distinguished by this variation in song.

The mimicry is arranged into sequences that are repeated with only moderate variations. The males learn these sequences from other lyrebirds through social transmission, so that males within a location share the same sequence of mimetic songs.

The males call for many hours a day during the peak of the winter breeding season and are quiet at other times. In alarm, the birds give a shrill shriek. Even when calling strongly, this shy and elusive species is not easily sighted in the dense tangled vegetation of its habitat, where the light is dim and the birds are wary.

== Habitat and distribution ==
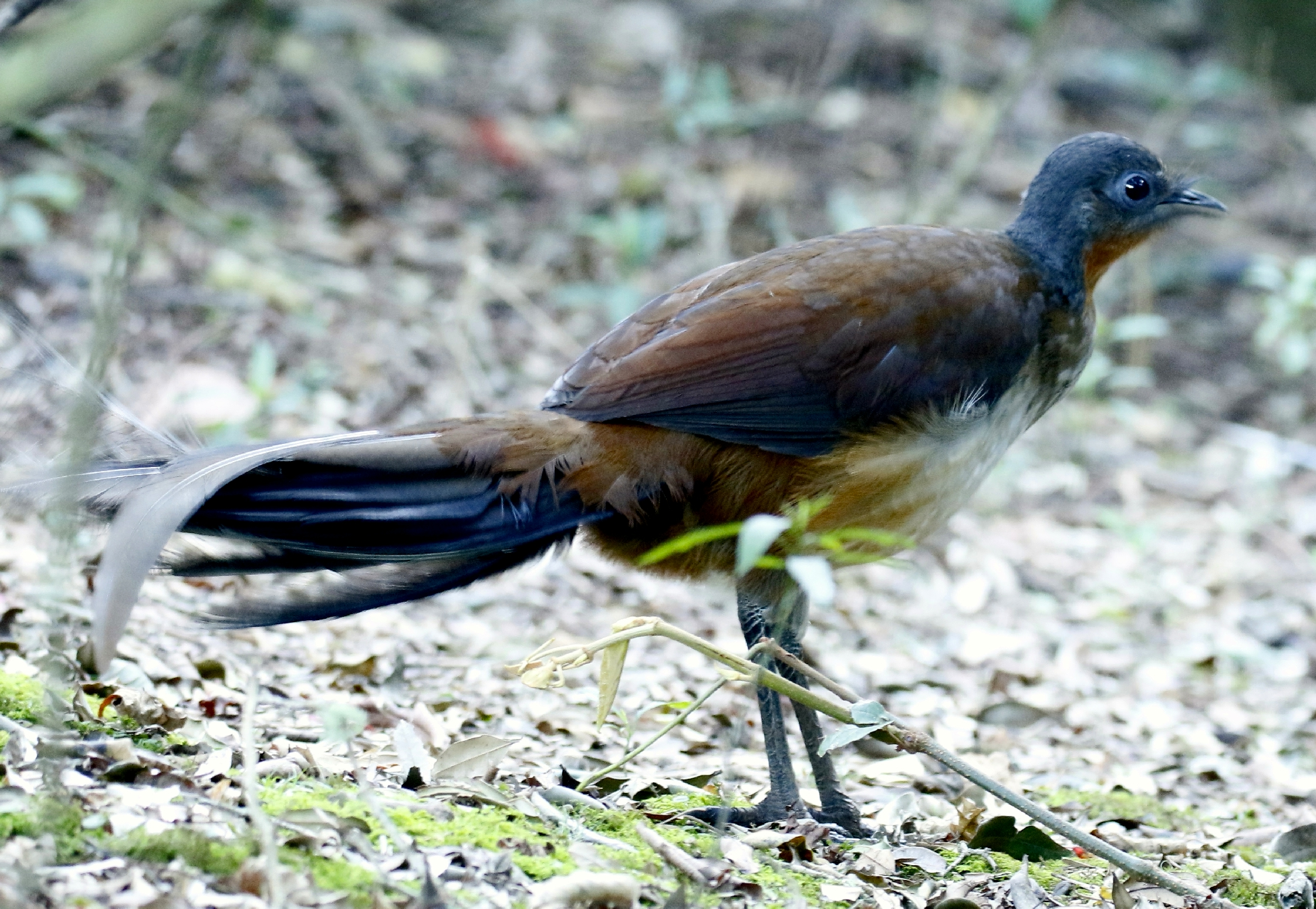
O'Reilly's Lodge - Australia

The extent of the Albert lyrebird's distribution has apparently declined significantly following European settlement. Much of the lyrebird's habitat was cleared during the 19th century. Although the species was still widespread in lowland areas at the beginning of the 20th century, the continued clearing of habitat since then has driven most populations into higher altitude forests, usually at least 300 metres above sea level. In the past, Albert's lyrebirds were shot to be eaten in pies, to supply tail-feathers to "globe-trotting curio-hunters" or by vandals.

The total population of Albert's lyrebirds was estimated at only 3,500 breeding birds in 2000, with one of the smallest distributional ranges of any bird on the continent. The bird's distribution is now restricted to several small areas of mountain ranges in the vicinity of far south-east Queensland and far north-east New South Wales; with much of the remaining habitat occurring in reserves. In Queensland, the Albert's lyrebird is found from Tamborine Mountain and Springbrook National Park in the east, to the McPherson Range in the west. Isolated populations exist in Mount Barney National Park and on the Main Range. The largest single population is found on the Lamington Plateau. Albert's lyrebirds were formerly recorded from the Sunshine Coast hinterland and from the D'Aguilar Ranges but have since disappeared from these areas.

In New South Wales it is found only in the far north of the Northern Rivers region, along the Border Ranges and in Nightcap National Park in the east, possibly as far west as Koreelah National Park. A large concentration is found in the Mount Warning area. Isolated populations may still exist in remnant rainforest patches as far south as Wardell.

The birds have a preference for rainforest with a dense understorey of vines and shrubs, or wet sclerophyll forest with a dense understorey of rainforest plants, including temperate rainforest. They are occasionally recorded in areas with mixed eucalypt forest, with a mesic understorey, around gullies and lower slopes, and with small amounts of rainforest in wet gullies.

The composition of plant species within these forests does not appear to be important except that a canopy of eucalypts is always associated with higher population densities when compared to rainforests that lack eucalypts (at sites with equivalent climates). Population densities increase along a gradient of increasing rainfall and decreasing mean annual temperature; with decreasing moisture index, the density of males declines and individuals become increasingly restricted to areas around gullies. In comparisons of wet sclerophyll forest and rainforest with equivalent climate and moisture index, higher densities always occur in wet sclerophyll forest and are associated with the greater weights of litter and logs and slower rates of litter decomposition.

Steep moist valleys and other areas that are physically or geographically protected from wildfire are likely to offer important refuge habitat.

Albert's lyrebird usually occurs singly or in pairs, or rarely in groups of three. It is sedentary (non-migratory), and remains in the same general area year-round. Males are territorial during the breeding season. Females seem to have their own separate territories, which partly overlap that of the male, and which they defend as feeding grounds rather than as the centre of a mating site. Data on territory sizes has only been recorded for males. Male territories are said to usually comprise an area of 5–15 ha (12–37 acres).

== Breeding and life cycle ==
The mating system of Albert's lyrebird is unknown; although the male courtship display has been well documented. The male birds use a flat piece of ground from which all debris has been raked for a stage, rather than a mound of debris as used by the superb lyrebird. In display, the male initially raises his tail to arch forwards above the head, then gradually lowers and shimmers it forwards until the bird is enveloped beneath the veil of fine bushy filaments, these are silvery with the shiny white underside of the plumes uppermost. There is no evidence of any lasting pair-bond between the male and female.

Throughout the species' range, eggs have been recorded from late May to mid-August. They nest beneath the canopy, usually in the darkest areas of the forest. Nests are often located in rocky areas, usually on ledges, in clefts or between rocks, or occasionally in caves, on rock or cliff-faces, or in deep rocky ravines; nests in such places are sometimes located near waterfalls. Nests may also be placed in a variety of other sites, including on the ground on steep slopes, on creek banks, between buttress roots of fig (Ficus) trees, amongst tree stumps, at the base of palm trees, amongst ferns, in dense shrubs or occasionally in tree forks.

Females sometimes nest close to sites used the previous year; occasionally, nest-sites may be re-used. The female alone builds the dome-shaped nest, which has a side entrance; it is composed of sticks, fern fronds, rootlets, bark, pieces of palm leaf and moss, and is lined with moss, fine plant material, and feathers. Construction of the nest may take at least three weeks. The overall appearance is rather like a pile of accumulated rainforest debris, which makes the nest quite inconspicuous.

Clutch-size is a single egg. The eggs can vary greatly in colour and, sometimes, shape, but are usually shaded brown or grey with spots and blotches, and sometimes other markings, of varying tones of brown and grey. The female incubates the eggs and feeds and broods the nestlings without any help from the male. The young fledge at approximately five and a half weeks. No information is available on breeding success, but it is claimed that a maximum of one brood may be reared in a season.

== Feeding ==
Lamington National Park, south-east Queensland, Australia

Albert's lyrebird appears to feed mainly on insects (including beetles) and their larvae, and other soil-dwelling invertebrates. They usually find food on the ground, particularly in areas with deep moist leaf litter and fallen logs, but they also forage occasionally in epiphytic ferns. They typically forage in areas that are rather open and lack dense shrub cover but have well-developed taller strata. When foraging on the ground they scratch among debris, turn over leaves and dig into soil in search of invertebrate prey; birds foraging in epiphytes were observed scratching and pecking.

== Threats ==
In New South Wales, the birds are listed as least concern under the Threatened Species Conservation Act 1995 (New South Wales), as of December 2013, and in Queensland they are listed as near threatened under the Nature Conservation Act 1992 (Queensland), as of July 2012.

The major threats to Albert's lyrebird include the intense management of forests and the replacement of optimal habitat with plantations of unsuitable species, such as eucalypts or hoop pines; invasion of logged or otherwise damaged habitat by weeds, especially Lantana camara, which reduces suitability of the habitat; damage to habitat by grazing stock; encroachment of urban or rural development close to habitat of Albert's lyrebirds; and predation by introduced red foxes (Vulpes vulpes), feral dogs and cats, and domestic dogs and cats, where the birds are located close to human settlements.

Some isolated populations are threatened simply because they are so small, and because population densities are lower than expected in optimal habitats close to areas of human settlement.

Global warming and its anticipated effects (habitat change, alteration to fire frequency/intensity) could be a potential threat to the lyrebird in the future and large-scale fires could potentially impact upon the entire population.

Because the range of the species is confined to such a small geographic area, a threatening event, such as a severe regional drought, has the potential to affect all individuals.
