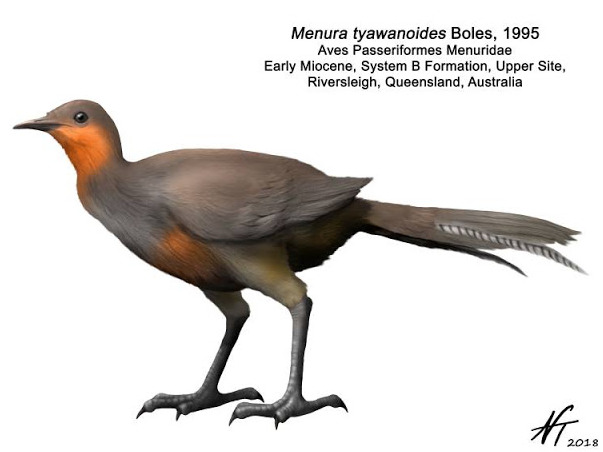
- Speculative life restoration

Scientific classification
- Kingdom: Animalia
- Phylum: Chordata
- Class: Aves
- Order: Passeriformes
- Family: Menuridae
- Genus: Menura
- Species: M. tyawanoides

Binomial name
- Menura tyawanoides Boles, 1995

= Menura tyawanoides =

Menura tyawanoides Temporal range: Early Miocene, 23–16 Ma

Extinct species of bird

Menura tyawanoides is an extinct species of lyrebird from northeast Australia that lived during the Early Miocene. Its fossils are known from a single site located at the Riversleigh World Heritage Area. It was smaller than the two living species of lyrebirds.

== Discovery and naming ==
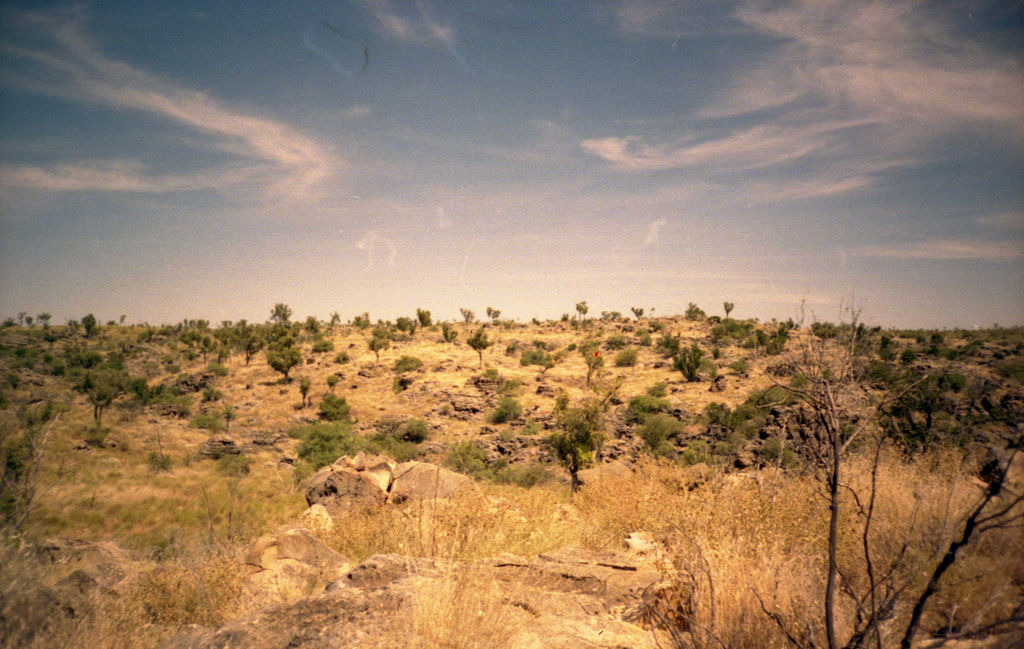
The Riversleigh World Heritage Area, where fossils of Menura tyawanoides have been found.

The description of Menura tyawanoides was published in 1995 by Walter Boles. The holotype and only known specimen, QM F20887, was recovered from a limestone deposit at the Riversleigh World Heritage Area, in the Boodjamulla National Park of north-western Queensland. It consists of a complete left carpometacarpus.

The specific epithet combines the Kumbainggiri word tyawan ("lyrebird") with the Greek suffix –oides ("resembling"), in reference to its close resemblance to modern lyrebirds.

== Description ==
The carpometacarpus of Menura tyawanoides differs from that of other lyrebird species in a few key ways. For instance, it is much smaller in size, being 29.3 mm (1.2 in) long. The knob away from and behind the pollical facet is relatively less pronounced. Both the pisiform process and internal ligamental fossa are more rounded. In addition, the fossa is separated from the depression near the proximal end of the third metacarpal by a ridge. Between the pisiform process and proximal ends of second and third metacarpals is a deep fossa. The dentiform process is more narrow and pointed than in other lyrebirds. The internal edge of the facet for the second digit has a ridge that is positioned much lower.

== Paleobiology ==
The distribution of Menura tyawanoides is restricted to Riversleigh, an area rich in series of well preserved fossil mammals, birds, and reptiles. It is currently only known from the Upper Site, which is thought to be of Early Miocene age based on its fauna. The Riversleigh area, at the time, would have been covered in tropical lowland rainforest habitat. M. tyawanoides would have had a similar lifestyle to modern lyrebirds, living in the dense understorey.

Like its living congeners, it would have been a poor flyer based on its carpometacarpus being short and stout, with a curved third metacarpal.
