= Norman Robinson (footballer) =

English footballer

Personal information
- Full name: Joseph Norman Robinson
- Date of birth: 5 January 1921
- Place of birth: Middlesbrough, England
- Date of death: 1990 (aged 68–69)
- Position: Defender

Senior career*
Years	Team	Apps	(Gls)
1938–1946	South Bank St Peter's		
1946–1948	Middlesbrough	16	(0)
1948–1949	Grimsby Town	5	(0)
- * Club domestic league appearances and goals

Joseph Norman Robinson (5 January 1921 – 1990) was an English professional footballer who played as a defender.
