= Frank Norman Robinson =

Australian technician and ornithologist (1911–1997)

Frank Norman Robinson (1911–1997) was an Australian sound recording technician and ornithologist who worked for many years with the CSIRO. He was born in England, studied economics and languages at Cambridge University, joined the British American Tobacco Company and was stationed in Singapore, then part of British Malaya. During the Second World War he was interned by Japanese forces in Sumatra. Following the war he was advised, for health reasons, not to live in the tropics, and in 1949 he settled with his family in Australia.

From 1951 to 1960 he was technical secretary with the newly formed CSIRO Wildlife Survey Section. He set up the Division of Wildlife's first sound laboratory 1961-1965 and was instrumental in establishing the CSIRO Wildlife Sound Library. In 1965 he transferred to Western Australia where he retired in 1971. During his career with CSIRO he was involved in pioneering studies, involving sound recording, of superb lyrebirds and noisy scrub-birds. He wrote many scientific papers, mainly dealing with bird song and vocal mimicry. Following retirement he continued his interest in sound recording and was generous in passing on his expertise to others. He was described by Ian Rowley as the "father of Australian bird recording".
