= List of Aboriginal Reserves in New South Wales =

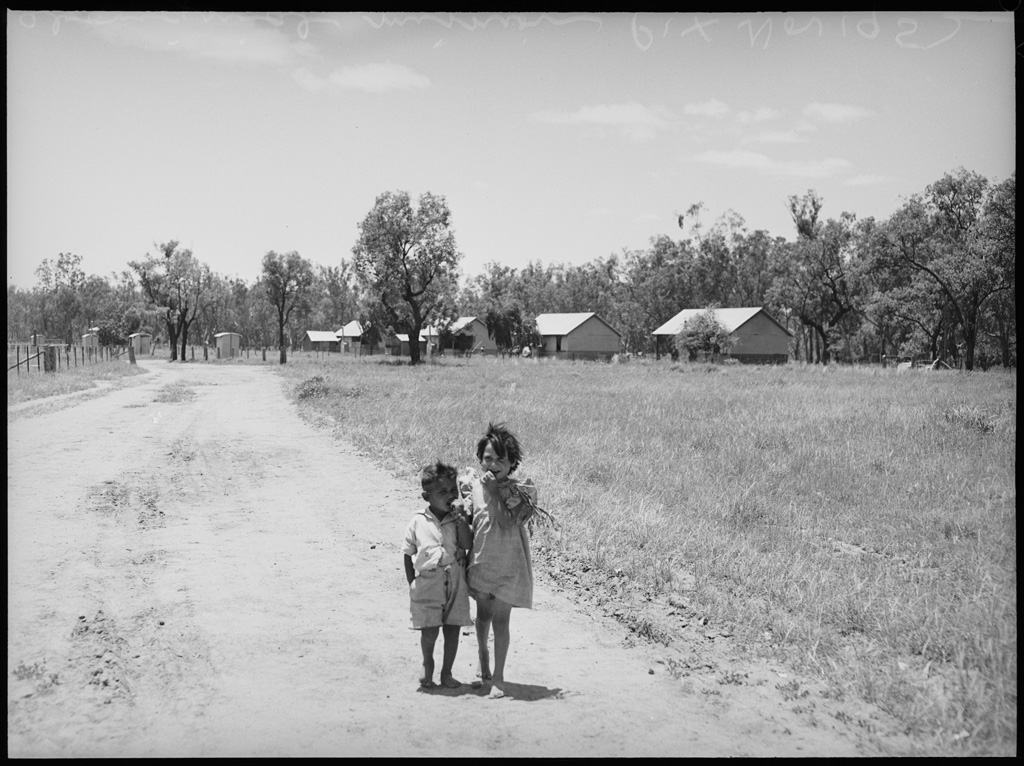
Children outside some of the 27 houses at Boggabilla Station, November 1952.

Aboriginal reserves in New South Wales, together with Stations, and Aboriginal Missions in New South Wales were areas of land where many Aboriginal people were forced to live in accordance with laws and policies. The British government, which controlled the Australian colonies, and later the state governments had various policies of segregation and assimilation. The Aboriginal reserves were established by government authorities as portions of land set aside for the sole use of Aboriginal people, a practice that continued after Federation in 1901. Of the 85 Aboriginal reserves created from 1885 to 1895, 47 were initiated by Aboriginal families. The Register of Aboriginal Reserves 1875-1904 held by NSW State Archives includes a map of the locality and a description of the area and whether it is good for hunting and fishing.

The reserves were operated under the direction of various government authorities including the Aborigines Protection Board (1883–1940), the Aborigines Welfare Board (1940–1969) and the Aborigines Welfare Directorate (1969–1975).

Aboriginal reserves, like the missions and other institutions, had the effect of isolating, confining and controlling Aboriginal people. People who were relocated to these reserves lost the human rights of freedom of movement and work, control over their personal property and the custody of their children. In New South Wales, some reserves were created in response to complaints by white residents who objected to Aboriginal people living in towns or in fringe camps on the edges of towns. Aboriginal Reserves were gazetted in the Government Gazette of the State of New South Wales. There were two types of reserves, managed reserves which are frequently called stations were normally staffed by a manager or matron and residents were provided with rations and housing. Unmanaged reserves provided only rations and were under the control of the local police.

Following World War I, a number of reserves were revoked, which may be linked to the allocation of land to returned servicemen.

In 1945, there were more than 100 reserves under the control of the Aborigines Welfare Board. Between 1954 and 1964 more than 25 reserves were revoked, which may be due to policies of assimilation and the relocation of people to town reserves. In 1953 there were 19 reserves under the control of the board, and at least one (Moree) was being actively consolidated and housing expanded. Reserves were sometimes added to, enlarging the area or revoked in portions over time.

The system of reserves and stations was ended by the Aborigines Act 1969. The Aboriginal Lands Trust was established by the Aborigines (Amendment) Act 1973. The Trust assumed the corporate ownership of all Aboriginal reserves throughout New South Wales on behalf of, and for the benefit of Aboriginal people. Freehold title to the remaining reserves was transferred to the Trust, to maintain, develop or dispose of these reserves in the manner which would best serve the needs of the Aboriginal community. The Trust was also responsible for houses located on the reserves. The Aboriginal Lands Trust was abolished by the Aboriginal Land Rights Act 1983. The property was transferred to the Minister for Aboriginal Affairs and from there to Aboriginal Land Councils.

In 1997 a system of Indigenous Protected Areas (IPAs) was introduced in Australia. The remaining Aboriginal Reserves in New South Wales are not automatically part of this system.

== Early history ==
In the 1870s and 1880s, land reserves were gazetted for specific individuals from Aboriginal clans including:

- Amos Lewis and others (15 June 1875)
- W. Campbell (13 July 1875)
- Richard Bolway (a.k.a. Bolloway or Bollaway) (19 October 1877)
- Merriman (19 October 1877)
- Yarboro (19 October 1877)
- Neddy (20 May 1878)
- Henry Roberts (19 August 1878) No. 43 county of Wellington, parish of Tunnabidgee. Revoked 8 June 1882.
- Mary Ann Willoughby (14 February 1879), 140 acres of No. 86, county of St.Vincent, parish of Mongarlowe.
- James Murray (7 April 1879) No. 1,056 county of Ashburnham, parish of Canomodine
- William Benson (22 November 1880)
- Tommy Again (14 June 1880) No. 76 county of Wellington, parish of Tunnabidgee (24 July 1882) No. 76a county of Wellington, parish of Tunnabidgee
- John Ambrose (11 August 1874) No. 1,209 county of Goulburn, parish of Vautier. Revoked 14 February 1881.
- Henry Wedge (11 July 1881) and (28 February 1883)
- Billy Billy (4 August 1884)
- Margaret Bryant (20 May 1885), just under 9 acres of No. 133, county of St.Vincent, parish of Mongarlowe Revoked 29 April 1893.
- John Bell (11 June 1887) and (09 February 1889)

== A ==
Reserve	Gazette number	Date gazetted	Date revoked	Notes	Parish and county	References
Allgomera Aboriginal Reserve	AR 38,625	10/12/1904	?	near Macksville on Tom Mara's Creek	Parish of Allgomera, County of Raleigh	
Angeldool Aboriginal Reserve	AR 41,025/6	07/11/1906	08/02/1944	appears to continue as a reserve from 22/10/1973	Parish of Birruma, County of Narran	
Armidale Aboriginal Reserve	AR 81,255	21/11/1958	13/06/1975		Parish of Armidale, County of Sandon	
Armidale Aboriginal Reserve	AR 87,623	16/01/1970	27/09/1973		Parish of Armidale, County of Sandon	
Ashby Aboriginal Reserve	AR 31,665	03/11/1900	05/08/1927	on the Broadwater and Clarence Rivers	Parish of Ashby, County of Clarence	
Ashford Aboriginal Reserve	AR 17,800	27/05/1893	20/12/1957		Parish of Pindari, County of Arrawatta	
Ashford Aboriginal Reserve	AR 40,459	02/05/1906	20/11/1925	Sevington, Ashford area	Parish of Blbonbah, County of Arrawatta	
Ashford Aboriginal Reserve	AR 69,118	21/05/1940	26/07/1974	Known as Deadbird Mission or Tarrangower Reserve	Parish of Chapman, County of Arrawatta	
Ashford Aboriginal Reserve	AR 85,428	20/08/1965	27/09/1973	Cooke Street	Parish of Ashford, County of Arrawatta	
Ashford Aboriginal Reserve	AR 87,126	28/03/1969	07/02/1975	Town Houses, Ashford	Parish of Ashford, County of Arrawatta	

== B ==
Reserve	Gazette number	Date gazetted	Date revoked	Notes	Parish and county	References
Ballina Aboriginal Reserve	AR 5,081	14/01/1888	?	on Emigrant Creek	Parish of Ballina County of Rous	
Balranald Aboriginal Reserve	AR 16,477	12/01/1910	08/08/1950	between Yanga Creek and the Murrumbidgee River and included AR 44,736	Parish of Mamang, County of Caira	
Balranald Aboriginal Reserve	AR 44,736	01/10/1892	080/8/1950	between Yanga Creek and the Murrumbidgee River	Parish of Mamang, County of Caira	
Balranald Aboriginal Reserve	AR 84,805	13/03/1964	23/08/1974	Lot 21, Section 22 located on Piper and Sydney Streets	Parish of Mamang, County of Caira	
Balranald Aboriginal Reserve	AR 66,640	19/03/1937	07/02/1975	DP4918 notified on 13/4/1892 and registered on 19/3/1937	Parish of Mamang, County of Caira	
Barrington Aboriginal Reserve	AR 35,673	31/01/1903	23/05/1958	known as Portion 21 and located north of Gloucester	Parish of Fitzroy, County of Gloucester	
Barrington River Aboriginal Reserve	AR 36,574	1890	05/10/1905	at the junction of the Talbragar and Macquarie Rivers		
Baryugil Aboriginal Reserve	AR 82,681	05/08/1960	26/07/1974	located on the Clarence River, Grafton land district	Parish of Yulgibar, County of Drake	
Batemans Bay Aboriginal Reserve	AR 112	09/01/1882	09/05/1975	on the Tomago River, also known as Moruya	Parish of Bateman, County of St Vincent	
Batemans Bay Aboriginal Reserve	AR 34,759	19/07/1902	16/09/1927	Portions 139, 140 and 141	Parish of Bateman, County of St Vincent	
Beemunnel Aboriginal Reserve	AR 76,776	?	?		Parish of Umangla, County of Ewenmar	
Bega Aboriginal Reserve	AR 17,616	1893	?	55 acres at Blackfellows Lake (then called Cohens Lake), included part of the reserve created for Jack Hoskins and his family In some sources known as Cohens' Lake Aboriginal Reserve	n/a	
Bega Aboriginal Reserve	AR 85,253	1955	?	9 acres	Parish of Bega, County of Auckland	
Bellbrook Aboriginal Reserve	AR 49,982	10/06/1914	06/06/1975	Initially a station north of Kempsey	Parish of Nulla Nulla, County of Dudley	
Bellingen Aboriginal Reserve	AR 14,679	24/10/1891	17/12/1954	An island in the Nambucca River	Parish of South Bellingen, County of Raleigh	
Bellingen Aboriginal Reserve	AR 73,990	26/01/1951	17/03/1975	2 miles from Nambucca Heads, were expanded in 1951 and 1969, total size of AR 73,990 and AR 87,256 was 42 acres	Parish of Nambucca, County of Raleigh	
Bellingen Aboriginal Reserve	AR 83,084	10/03/1961	20/09/1974	in Coffs Harbour	Parish of Coffs, County of Fitzroy	
Bellingen Aboriginal Reserve	AR 87,033	27/12/1968	20/09/1974		Parish of Coffs, County of Fitzroy	
Bellingen Aboriginal Reserve	AR 87,256	26/01/1951	24/04/1975	2 miles from Nambucca Heads, were expanded in 1951 and 1969, total size of AR 73,990 and AR 87,256 was 42 acres	Parish of Nambucca, County of Raleigh	
Bermagui Aboriginal Reserve	AR 86,062	23/10/1964	?	on Hill Street, Bermagui	Parish of Bermagee, County of Dampier	
Bodalla Aboriginal Reserve	AR 553	22/11/1880	070/9/1917	32 acres on the bank of Tuross Lake	Parish of Congo, County of Dampier	
Bodalla Aboriginal Reserve	AR 345	19/10/1877	27/01/1922	40 acres at the mouth of the Tuross River	Parish of Bodalla, County of Dampier	
Bodalla Aboriginal Reserve	AR 346	19/10/1877	16/12/1914	56 acres at the mouth of the Tuross River	Parish of Bodalla, County of Dampier	
Bodalla Aboriginal Reserve	AR 347	19/10/1877	23/05/1969	40 acres at the mouth of the Tuross River	Parish of Bodalla, County of Dampier	
Boggabilla Aboriginal Reserve	AR 14,210	08/08/1891	24/05/1918	457 acres	Parish of Boggabilla, the County of Staplyton	
Bokal-Ynee Aboriginal Reserve	AR 42,950	05/08/1908	20/09/1974	Woodenbong area registered as AR 42,950 on 5/8/1908 and renotified as AR 66,508 AR 66,509 on 15/1/1937. Transferred to management by Mulli Mulli Aboriginal Land Council 9 March 1984.	Parish of Lindsay, County of Bullar	
Boorowa Aboriginal Reserve	AR 33,675	21/12/1901	09/08/1974		Parish of Opton, County of King	
Boorowa Aboriginal Reserve	AR 64,379/80	02/02/1934	?	known as Portion 90	Parish of Opton, County of King	
Bourke Aboriginal Reserve	AR 72,021	30/08/1946	02/08/1974	a town reserve	Parish of Bourke, County of Cowper	
Bourke Aboriginal Reserve	AR 78,457/8	06/04/1956	?	a town reserve in Cowper and Hope Streets	Parish of Bourke, County of Cowper	
Bourke Aboriginal Reserve	AR 83,582	17/11/61	27/9/68	in Adelaide Street	Parish of Bourke, County of Cowper	
Bourke Aboriginal Reserve	AR 84,544	27/09/1963	?	in Warrego Street	Parish of Bourke, County of Cowper	
Bowraville Aboriginal Reserve	AR 168	17/11/1884	30/10/1912	O'Rourkes' Settlement on the Taylor's Arm of the Nambucca River	Parish of Bowra, County of Raleigh	
Bowraville Aboriginal Reserve	AR 42,775	03/06/1908	09/05/1924	called Wirrimbi Island and included AR 57,051	Parish of Bowra, County of Raleigh	
Bowraville Aboriginal Reserve	AR 62,815 AR 62,816	17/07/1931	27/09/1973	36 acres	Parish of Bowra, County of Raleigh	
Box Ridge Aboriginal Reserve	AR 41,808/9	10/07/1907	?		Parish of West Coraki, County of Richmond	
Brewarrina Aboriginal Reserve	AR 4	17/06/1885	28/10/1966 25/07/1975	with AR 3,152 gazetted on 5/3/1887 constituted the old Brewarrina Station	Parishes of Goonoo and Cato, County of Narran	
Brewarrina Aboriginal Reserve	AR 77,614	20/05/1955	07/02/1975	in Church Street Brewarrina	Parish of Brewarrina, County of Clyde	
Brewarrina Aboriginal Reserve	AR 84,764	21/02/1964	?		Parish of Brewarrina, County of Clyde	
Brewarrina Aboriginal Reserve	AR 71,410	26/01/1945	06/06/1975	17.2 hectares, portion 76 Plan N 476.1999	Parish of Cowga, County of Narran	
Brungle Aboriginal Reserve	AR 12,489	13/09/1890	12/08/1955	3 acres	Parish of Brungle, County of Buccleuch	
Brungle Aboriginal Reserve	AR 44,288	15/09/1909	12/08/1955	an area of 31 acres was regazetted as AR 77,806	Parish of Brungle, County of Buccleuch	
Bugilbar Creek Aboriginal Reserve	AR 84,957	24/07/1964	?	120 acres in the Grafton area including AR 69,558 which was revoked 24/7/1964	Parish of Ogilvie, County of Drake	
Bulgandramine Aboriginal Reserve	AR 41,699/700	29/05/1907	17/07/1959	on Goobang Creek near the Billabong Goldfield in the Parkes area	Parish of Mungerie, County of Kennedy	
Bulgandramine Aboriginal Reserve	AR 59,878/9	12/08/1927	19/03/1943	34 acres	Parish of Mungerie, County of Kennedy	
Bundarra Aboriginal Reserve (Bushfield)	AR 23,595	01/02/1896	23/12/1914	In the Tingha area on opposite sides of Moredun or Clerk's Creek	Parish of New Valley, County of Hardinge	
Bundarra Aboriginal Reserve	AR 25,909	24/04/1897	23/12/1914	168 acres	Parish of Chigwell, County of Hardinge	
Burnt Bridge Aboriginal Reserve	AR 20,865	09/06/1894	17/07/1956	Kempsey area on Rollands' Plains Road, Portion 40 on Euroke Creek	Parish of Kalateenee, County of Dudley	
Burnt Bridge Aboriginal Reserve	AR 27,273	19/02/1892	17/07/1956	Kempsey area on Rollands' Plains Road, Portions 91, 92 and 93	Parish of Kalateenee, County of Dudley	
Burnt Bridge Aboriginal Reserve	AR 68,441 AR 68,442	30/06/1939	04/10/1974	Kempsey area on Rollands' Plains Road, originally AR 27,279	Parish of Kalateenee, County of Dudley	
Buronga Aboriginal Reserve (Wentworth)	AR 84,994	28/08/1964	23/08/1974	Buronga Village in Buronga township	Parish of Mourquong, County of Wentworth	
Burra Bee Dee Aboriginal Reserve	AR 47,521	21/02/1912	26/11/1974	on the Castlereagh River in the Coonabarabran area included the following reserves revoked on the same date: AR 15,156 6/2/1892, AR 40,125 20/1/1906, AR 46,876 9/8/1911 see Mary Jane Cain	Parish of Coonabarabran, County of Gowen	
Burra Bee Dee Aboriginal Reserve	AR 35,012	27/09/1902	1952?	30 acres	Parish of Yarrawin, County of Gowen	
Burragorang Aboriginal Reserve	AR 17,023	23/12/1892	31/10/1924	Picton area on the north bank of the Cox's River opposite the junction of the Wollondilly and Warragamba Rivers included AR 10, AR 159 and AR 14,937	Parish of Cooba, County of Cook	
Byron Bay Aboriginal Reserve	AR 43,074/5	09/09/1908	10/03/1916	near Tallow Creek in Byron Bay	Parish of Byron, County of Rous	

== C ==
Reserve	Gazette number	Date gazetted	Date revoked	Notes	Parish and county	References
Cabbage Tree Island Aboriginal Reserve	AR 52,180 AR 52,181	27/4/1917	19/9/1975 11/9/1964	125 acre island in the Richmond River	Parish ofBroadwater, County of Rous	
Calino Aboriginal Reserve	AR 27,506	1898	?	Deniliquin area, junction of the Edward River and Tumudgery Creek		
Caroona Aboriginal Reserve	AR 28,828	18/1/1899	27/09/1973	Originally Caroona Station near Quirindi	Parish of Doona, County of Pottinger	
Caroona Aboriginal Reserve	AR 30,777	7/4/1900	?	Originally Caroona Station near Quirindi, Portion 214	Parish of Doona, County of Pottinger	
Casino Aboriginal Reserve	AR 72,945	7/1/1949	28/11/1975		Parish of Timbarra, County of Drake	
Casino Aboriginal Reserve	AR 72,484	31/10/1947	2/8/1974		Parish of Tallawudjah, County of Fitzroy	
Collarenebri Aboriginal Reserve	AR 29,330	13/5/1899	8/2/1924	159 acres	Parish of Collarenebri, County of Finch	
Collarenebri Aboriginal Reserve	AR 86,194	24/2/1967	?	Church, Earl and High Streets	Parish of Collarenebri, County of Finch	
Condobolin Aboriginal Reserve	AR 80,173 and AR 80,174	29/11/1957	7/08/1970	on Boona Road, part of 80,173 revoked on 7/08/1970	Parish of Condobolin, County of Cunningham	
Condobolin Aboriginal Reserve	AR 84,827	3/4/1964	20/09/1974	Gordon and Station Streets	Parish of Condobolin, County of Cunningham	
Condobolin Aboriginal Reserve	AR 32,512	13/4/1901	9/05/1975	originally registered as AR 5,988	Parish of South Condobolin, County of Gibbs	
Coomaditchie Aboriginal Reserve	AR 83,896	29/6/1962	20/09/1974	Shellharbour Road at Warrawong	Parish of Wollongong, County of Camden	
Coonabarabran Aboriginal Reserve	AR 72,169 AR 72,170	14/2/1947	20/09/1974	in the town area	Parish of Coonabarabran, County of Gowen	
Coonabarabran Aboriginal Reserve	AR 77,160 AR 77,161	8/10/1954	20/09/1974	in the town area	Parish of Coonabarabran, County of Gowen	
Coonabarabran Aboriginal Reserve	AR 84,539	20/9/1963	20/09/1974	in the town area	Parish of Coonabarabran, County of Gowen	
Coonabarabran Aboriginal Reserve	AR 84,540	20/9/1963	2/8/1974	in the town area	Parish of Coonabarabran, County of Gowen	
Coonamble Aboriginal Reserve	AR 31,713	20/10/1900	28/7/1922	65 acres at Wingadee on Teridgerie Creek	Parish of Collinouie, County of Leichhardt	
Coonamble Aboriginal Reserve	AR 31,811	24/11/1900	31/10/1941	40 acres on the Castlereagh River	Parish of Yarragoora, County of Leichhardt	
Coonamble Aboriginal Reserve	AR 43,948	2/6/1909	30/9/1921	20 acres	Parish of Yoee, County of Leichhardt	
Coonamble Aboriginal Reserve	AR 86,570	29/12/1909	?	in King Street	Parish of Moorambilla, County of Leichhardt	
Cootamundra Aboriginal Reserve	AR 61,007/8	8/3/1929	?	included AR 13915/6 and Cootamundra Home	Parish of Cootamundra, County of Harden	
Cootamundra Aboriginal Reserve	AR 83,239	16/6/1961	?	may have been called Bimbadeen	Parish of Cootamundra, County of Harden	
Crookhaven Aboriginal Reserve	?	7/1/1879	?	201 acres		
Cubawee (officially Tuncester Reserve)	AR 63,335	13/5/1932		Self-managed from 1932–1965; near Tuncester	Parish of South Lismore, County of Rous	
Cubawee	AR 71,667	21/9/1945	1965		Parish of South Lismore, County of Rous	
Cumeroogunya (or Cumeragunja) Aboriginal Reserve	AR 3,045	9/4/1883	31/10/1975	1,800 acres	Parish of Bama, County of Cadell	
Cumeroogunya (or Cumeragunja) Aboriginal Reserve	AR 8,997 AR 8,998	18/5/1899	20/09/1974	90 acres	Parish of Bama, County of Cadell	
Cumeroogunya (or Cumeragunja) Aboriginal Reserve	AR 17,180	28/1/1893	31/10/1975	403 acres	Parish of Bama, County of Cadell	
Cumeroogunya (or Cumeragunja) Aboriginal Reserve	AR 31,120	20/6/1900	20/09/1974	320 acres	Parish of Bama, County of Cadell	
Curlewis Aboriginal Reserve	AR 81,340	9/1/1959	?	Gunnedah area	Parish of Curlewis, County of Pottinger	
Currowan Creek Aboriginal Reserve	AR 17,546	15/4/1893	9/5/1956	also known as Currawong, 60 acres on the Clyde River	Parish of Currawan, County of St Vincent	

== D ==
Reserve	Gazette number	Date gazetted	Date revoked	Notes	Parish and county	References
Dandaloo Aboriginal Reserve	AR 30,499	13/1/1900	26/07/1974	25 acres	Parish of Yarradidgerie, County of Narromine	
Dareton Aboriginal Reserve	AR 87,140)	16/5/1969	1/08/1975	11 acres, continues as Dareton Local Aboriginal Land Council's Namatjira settlement.	Parish of Mourquong, County of Wentworth	
Darlington Point Aboriginal Reserve	AR 7,304/5	29/9/1888	29/10/1937	on the Murrumbidgee River renotified as AR 67,083/4 on 29/10/1937	Parish of Colaragang, County of Cooper	
Delegate Aboriginal Reserve	AR 15,784)	11/6/1892	18/1/1957	10 acres on the Delegate River	Parish of Currawong, County of Wellesley	
Deniliquin Aboriginal Reserve	AR 704	9/4/1883	21/2/1947 31/10/1975		Parish of Bama, County of Cadell	
Deniliquin Aboriginal Reserve	AR 73,248	12/8/1949	?	Portion 5	Parish of South Deniliquin, County of Townsend	
Deniliquin Aboriginal Reserve	AR 73,284	9/09/1949	20/09/1974		Parish of South Deniliquin, County of Townsend	
Deniliquin Aboriginal Reserve	AR 79,410 AR 79.411	15/3/1957	20/09/1974	2 acres	Parish of South Deniliquin, County of Townsend	
Deniliquin Aboriginal Reserve	AR 84,135	11/1/1963	20/09/1974	Macauley St, Deniliquin	Parish of South Deniliquin, County of Townsend	
Deniliquin Aboriginal Reserve	AR 88,048	11/12/1970	20/09/1974		Parish of South Deniliquin, County of Townsend	
Dubbo Aboriginal Reserve	AR 15,784	22/1/1960	?	a hostel in Dubbo	Parish of Dubbo, County of Lincoln	
Dubbo Aboriginal Reserve	AR 28,481	5/11/1898	26/07/1974		Parish of Dubbo, County of Lincoln	
Dunoon Aboriginal Reserve	AR 35,824/5	25/3/1903	16/8/1935	420 acres on the Lismore-Tweed Road; see also Cubawee	Parish of North Lismore, County of Rous; Modanville locality	

== E ==
Reserve	Gazette number	Date gazetted	Date revoked	Notes	Parish and county	References
Enngonia Aboriginal Reserve	AR 79,636	31/5/1957	?	10 acres	Parish of Enngonia, County of Culgoa	
Erambie Aboriginal Reserve	AR 11,634	7/6/1890	20/09/1974	Portions 261 to 263 on the Boorawa Road	Parish of Mulyan, County of Forbes	
Erambie Aboriginal Reserve	AR 72,706	21/5/1948	20/09/1974	Portions 123 and 187 on the Boorawa Road	Parish of Mulyan, County of Forbes	
Euabalong Aboriginal Reserve	AR 44,783/4	27/1/1910	1954	north of Lake Cargellico on the Lachlan River	Parish of Gumbagunda, County of Dowling	
Eugowra Aboriginal Reserve	AR 9,386	20/7/1889	?	In 15/9/1922, a section of the reserve called Portion 9 (Goolagong) was revoked.	Parish of Eugowra, County of Ashburnham	
Eungau Aboriginal Reserve	AR 39,584/5)	26/8/1905	7/5/1920	Macksville area	Parish of Allgomera, County of Raleigh	
Eurabba Aboriginal Reserve	?	24/9/1898	20/8/1926	on Garah-Boomi Road	Parish of Tyrell, County of Benarba	
Evans Head Aboriginal Reserve	AR 83,775	23/3/1963	4/10/1974	Heath Street	Parish of Riley, County of Richmond	

== F ==
Reserve	Gazette number	Date gazetted	Date revoked	Notes	Parish and county	References
Forbes Aboriginal Reserve	AR 43,462/3	20/1/1909	1/12/1915	20 acres on the Lachlan River	Parish of Forbes, County of Ashburnham	
Forster Aboriginal Reserve	AR 22,946	3/5/1911	?	19 acres	Parish of Forster, County of Gloucester	
Forster Aboriginal Reserve	AR 81,522	10/04/1959	?		Parish of Forster, County of Gloucester	
Forster Aboriginal Reserve	AR 13,438	21/2/1891	?	village of Forster	Parish of Forster, County of Gloucester	
Forster Aboriginal Reserve	AR 13,439	21/2/1891	?	village of Forster	Parish of Forster, County of Gloucester	

== G ==
Reserve	Gazette number	Date gazetted	Date revoked	Notes	Parish and county	References
Gilgai Aboriginal Reserve	AR 85,182	18/4/1964	?		Parish of Clive, County of Gough	
Gilgandra Aboriginal Reserve	AR 79,198 / AR 79,190	14/12/1956	27/09/1973	there may have been an earlier reserve AR 57,420	Parish of Bobarah, County of Ewenmar	
Gingie Aboriginal Reserve	AR 23,077	19/10/1895	?	320 acres on the Barwon River in the Walgett area	Parish of Gingie, County of Finch	
Gingie Aboriginal Reserve	AR 69,691	22/11/1940	?	20 acres on the Barwon River in the Walgett area	Parish of Gingie, County of Finch	
Glen Innes Aboriginal Reserve	AR 83,876	15/6/1962	4/10/1974	Mosman Street	Parish of Glen Innes, County of Gough	
Glennies Creek Aboriginal Reserve	AR	1890	?	58 acres, Hunter Valley		
Glenreagh Aboriginal Reserve	AR 84,929	26/6/1964	2/8/1974		Parish of Tallawudjah, County of Fitzroy	
Goodooga Aboriginal Reserve	AR 16,047 / AR 16,048	8/8/1892	?	42 acres	Parish of Cowra, County of Narran	
Goodooga Aboriginal Reserve	AR 44,303 / AR 44,304	1/9/1909	26/1/1945	80 acres on the Bokhara River	Parish of Cowra, County of Narran	
Goodooga Aboriginal Reserve	AR 85,734	7/4/1966	?	3 acres 2 roods, allotments 7 and 8, section 9, allotment 10, section 17, allotments 2 and 5, section 2, and allotments 1 and 10, section 11, village of Goodooga. Plans Bookara 1, 4 and 6 2,216. Papers W.L.C. 65-1,708. P. 66-933.	Parish of Cowra, County of Narran	
Gosford Aboriginal Reserve	AR 71,027	5/11/1943	24/4/1975	for preservation of Aboriginal carvings and drawings	Parish of Narara, County of Northumberland	
Grafton Aboriginal Reserve	AR 82,733	12/08/1960	9/08/1963		Parish of Yamba, County of Clarence	
Grafton Aboriginal Reserve	AR 2,951	15/1/1887	12/6/1925	80 acres near Bunyip Creek	Parish of Great Marlow, County of Clarence	
Grafton Aboriginal Reserve	AR 14,493	26/9/1891	12/6/1925	120 acres	Parish of Great Marlow, County of Clarence	
Grafton Aboriginal Reserve	AR 17,794	27/5/1893	12/6/1925	105 acres	Parish of Great Marlow, County of Clarence	
Grafton Aboriginal Reserve	AR 2,954	12/1/1887	17/6/1921	north bank of Whiteman's Creek	Parish of Eaton, County of Clarence	
Grafton Aboriginal Reserve	AR 15,679	21/5/1892	?	near Blaxland's Creek (burial site)	Parish of Elland, County of Clarence	
Grafton Aboriginal Reserve	AR 2,953 / AR 6303	15/1/1887	28/4/1888	160 acres on the Mitchell River near Copmanhurst	Parish of Cangai, County of Drake	
Grafton Aboriginal Reserve	AR 2,958	15/1/1887	23/9/1921	on the Nymboida River near Cloud's Creek	Parish of Jardine, County of Fitzroy	
Grafton Aboriginal Reserve	AR 2,952	15/1/1887	31/3/1916	58 acres at Iluka Creek	Parish of Nanegai, County of Clarence	
Grafton Aboriginal Reserve	AR 42,532	18/3/1908	13/5/1913	50 acres south-east of the Clarence River	Parish of Clarenza, County of Clarence	
Grafton (Nymboida) Aboriginal Reserve	AR 45,162 / AR 45,163	20/4/1910	4/07/1975		Parish of Shannon, County of Fitzroy	
Grafton (Nymboida) Aboriginal Reserve	AR 50,790	23/6/1915	?		Parish of Shannon, County ofFitzroy	
Grafton Aboriginal Reserve	AR 50,988	22/9/1915	11/9/1964	5 acres near Lawrence, included Camira Reserve (1887) and Orara Reserve (1887)	Parish of Lawrence, County of Clarence	
Greenhills Aboriginal Reserve	AR 79,176	7/12/1956	4/10/1974	Kempsey area	Parish of Yarravel, County of Dudley	
Greenhills Aboriginal Reserve	AR 84,710	30/6/1967	26/07/1974	Kempsey area (some sources date revoked 8/08/1975)	Parish of Yarravel, County of Dudley	
Grenfell Aboriginal Reserve	AR 50,887	11/8/1915	10/9/1965	5 acres on the Lachlan River	Parish of Binda, County of Forbes	
Griffith Aboriginal Reserve (Three Ways)	AR 76,685 AR 76,686	7/5/1954	5/09/1975		Parish of Jondaryan, County of Cooper	
Grong Grong Aboriginal Reserve	AR 410	23/6/1884	?	1,280 acres near the Murrumbidgee River, see also AR 130	Parish of Grong Grong, County of Cooper	
Gulargambone Aboriginal Reserve	AR 16,640	5/11/1892	20/1/1913	70 acres	Parish of Gulargambone, County of Gowen	
Gulargambone Aboriginal Reserve	AR 67,671 / AR 67,672	17/6/1938	?		Parish of Gulargambone, County of Gowen	
Gulargambone Aboriginal Reserve	AR 57,945 / AR 57,946	9/5/1924	13/1/1956	50 acres	Parish of Warrie, County of Ewenmar	
Gulargambone Aboriginal Reserve	AR 72,180 / AR 72,181	21/2/1947	26/07/1974	Coonamble land district	Parish of Warrie, County of Ewenmar	
Gulargambone Aboriginal Reserve	AR 85,617	14/1/1966	4/10/1974	5 acres on Mendooran and Kirban Streets	Parish of Gulargambone, County ofGowen	
Gunnedah Aboriginal Reserve	AR 85,480	1/10/1965	4/10/1974	on Carroll Street	Parish of Gunnedah, County of Pottinger	
Guyra Aboriginal Reserve	AR 76,430	11/12/1953	19/4/1968	11 acres	Parish of Elderbury, County of Hardinge	
Guyra Aboriginal Reserve	AR 83,884	29/6/1962	27/09/1973	on Stevenson and Sandon Streets	Parish of Falconer, County of Sandon	

== H ==
Reserve	Gazette number	Date gazetted	Date revoked	Notes	Parish and county	References
Hillston Aboriginal Reserve	AR 37,903 / AR 37,904	2/7/1904	1/10/1926	98 acres on the Lachlan River	Parish of Redbank, County of Nicholson.	
Hunter River Aboriginal Reserve	AR 24,331	4/7/1896	?	in lieu of AR 13,791	Parish of Darlington, County of Durham	

== I ==
Reserve	Gazette number	Date gazetted	Date revoked	Notes	Parish and county	References
Ilford Aboriginal Reserve	AR 30,112	18/11/1899	27/10/1933	On Crudine Creek	Parish of Rylstone, County of Roxburgh	
Inglebar Aboriginal Reserve (Walcha)	AR 17,780	27/5/1893	2/8/1974	107 acres	Parish of Cobrabald, County of Vernon	
Inverell Aboriginal Reserve	AR 18,210	15/2/1952	?	20 acres near Pindari Creek	Parish of Clive, County of Gough	
Inverell Aboriginal Reserve	AR 87,943	25/9/1970	2/4/1971	Hindmarsh Street	Parish of Inverell, County of Gough	
Inverell Aboriginal Reserve	AR 77,053	17/09/1954	9/08/1974		Parish of Darby, County of Hardinge	
Iron Pot Creek Aboriginal Reserve	AR 6,269	28/4/1888	?	3,000 acres 35 miles from Casino	County of Rous, Parishes of Toonumbar and Babyl	

== J ==
Reserve	Gazette number	Date gazetted	Date revoked	Notes	Parish and county	References
Jervis Bay Aboriginal Reserve	AR 101	26/9/1881	18/2/1916	also referred to as an Aboriginal mission	Parish of Beecroft, County of St Vincent	

== K ==
Reserve	Gazette number	Date gazetted	Date revoked	Notes	Parish and county	References
Kahibah Aboriginal Reserve	AR 88,398	12/11/1971	?	in the Newcastle area	Parish of Kahibah, County of Northumberland	
Kangaroo Valley Aboriginal Reserve	AR 12,445	1890	?	370 acres		
Karuah Aboriginal Reserve	AR 27,957	6/7/1898	3/8/1923	Sawer's Point, the balance was revoked on 7/2/1975	Parish of Tarean, County of Gloucester	
Kempsey Aboriginal Reserve	AR 174	23/4/1883	?	on the Macleay River	Parish of Arakun, County of Macquarie	
Kempsey Aboriginal Reserve	AR 251	25/11/1885	?	known as Pelican Island	Parish of Arakun, County of Macquarie	
Kempsey Aboriginal Reserve (Shark Island)	AR 10,187	23/11/1889	3/9/1920	Shark Island Aboriginal Reserve	Parish of Arakun, County of Macquarie	
Kempsey Aboriginal Reserve	AR 12,998	29/11/1890	?	partly in lieu of reserve AR 10,031	County of Dudley, parish of Kullatine	
Kempsey Aboriginal Reserve	AR 57,397 / AR 57,398	29/8/1924	?	30 acres revoking AR 29,616	Parish of Arakun, County of Macquarie	
Kempsey Aboriginal Reserve	AR 82,168 / AR 82,169	20/11/1959	?		Parish of Arakun, County of Macquarie	
Kempsey Aboriginal Reserve	AR 88,638	16/6/1972	7/2/1975	on the Macleay River	Parish of Clybucca, County of Dudley	
Kempsey Aboriginal Reserve (Kinchela Home)	AR 17,537	15/4/1893	25/4/1919	reserve and Kinchela Home	Parish of Kinchela, County of Macquarie OR Parish of Clybucca, County of Dudley	
Kempsey Aboriginal Reserve	AR 173A	28/7/1884	?	on Dingo Creek	Parish of Kinchela, County of Macquarie	
Kempsey Aboriginal Reserve	AR 252	4/4/1906	16/9/1960	14 acres in Kempsey	Parish of Beranghi, County of Macquarie	
Kempsey Aboriginal Reserve	AR 40,391	22/12/1957	?	10 acres on Yarravel Street	Parish of Beranghi, County of Macquarie	
Kempsey Aboriginal Reserve	AR 79,442	24/5/1968	20/09/1974		Parish of Beranghi, County of Macquarie	
Kempsey Aboriginal Reserve	AR 82,773 and AR 83,090	26/8/1960	20/09/1974	West Kempsey	Parish of Beranghi, County of Macquarie	
Kempsey Aboriginal Reserve	AR 86,751	24/05/1968	20/09/1974	West Kempsey	Parish of Beranghi, County of Macquarie	
Kiah Aboriginal Reserve	AR 87,736	1/5/1970	?		Parish of Nullica, County of Auckland	
Kyogle Aboriginal Reserve	AR 27,158	22/1/1898	16/10/1964	included AR 24,791 often referred to as Runnymede	Parish of Runnymede, County of Rous	

== L ==
Reserve	Gazette number	Date gazetted	Date revoked	Notes	Parish and county	References
Lake Cargellico Aboriginal Reserve	AR 85,284	5/4/1965	10/12/1976		Parish of Gurangully, County of Dowling	
La Perouse Aboriginal Reserve	AR 22,358	30/3/1895	?	in the Sydney area on Botany Bay	Parish of Botany, County of Cumberland	
La Perouse Aboriginal Reserve	AR 82,060	2/10/1959	?	in the Sydney area on Botany Bay	Parish of Botany, County of Cumberland	
Llandilo Aboriginal Reserve	AR 85,272	26/3/1956	?	at Penrith	Parish of Londonderry, County of Cumberland	

== M ==
Reserve	Gazette number	Date gazetted	Date revoked	Notes	Parish and county	References
Maclean Aboriginal Reserve (Hillcrest)	AR 7,840	16/3/1956	?		Parish of Taloumbi, County of Clarence	
Maitland Aboriginal Reserve	AR 24,533	22/8/1896	5/6/1959	one of four reserves in the Hunter Valley, located in East Maitland on Broughton Creek	Parish of Shenstone, County of Durham	
Mallanganee Aboriginal Reserve	AR 84,119	21/2/1962	27/09/1973		Parish of Sandilands, County of Drake	
Mallanganee Aboriginal Reserve	AR 88,413	3/12/1971	26/07/1974	Casino land district	Parish of Sandilands, County of Drake	
Manilla Aboriginal Reserve	AR 35,745	23/3/1903	17/3/1961	20 acres on the Darling River	Parish of Keepit, County of Darling	
Megalong Aboriginal Reserve	AR 25,296	9/11/1897	14/1/1916	on Burranbarrack or Pulpit Hill Creek in the Blue Mountains	Parish of Megalong, County of Cook	
Menindee Aboriginal Reserve	AR 64,562 re-registered as AR 89,531	1933	1949	formerly the Old Menindee Station		
Menindee Aboriginal Reserve	AR 87,277	18/7/1969 and 29/5/1970	23/8/1974	in the town of Menindee	Parish of Perry, County of Menindee	
Milparinka Aboriginal Reserve	AR 66,592	19/02/1937	23/08/1974	Western Division	Parish of Hermitage, County of Tongowoko	
Moama Aboriginal Reserve	AR 86,278	19/5/1967	27/09/1973		Parish of Moama, County of Cadell	
Moama Aboriginal Reserve	AR 86,610	19/2/1968	26/07/1974	originally AR 18,665 gazetted 4/11/1914	Parish of Moama, County of Cadell	
Mongarlowe Aboriginal Reserve	AR 51	14/2/1879	25/2/1916	near Braidwood	Parish of Mongarlowe, County of St Vincent	
Moonacullah Aboriginal Reserve	AR 27,506 / AR 27,507	16/10/1964	245 acres	partly revoked on 16/10/1964	Parish of Colimo, County of Townsend	
Moonacullah Aboriginal Reserve	AR 86,479	23/4/1898	?	includes a cemetery	Parish of Colimo, County of Townsend	
Moree Aboriginal Reserve	AR 87,907	17/7/1970	20/09/1974	Moree; Moree Station and Moree Mission Aboriginal School existed there around 1933	Parish of Moree, County of Courallie	
Moruya Aboriginal Reserve	AR 13,939	13/6/1891	?		Parish of Noorooma, County of Dampier	
Moruya Aboriginal Reserve	AR 378	?	?	40 acres	Parish of Bodalla, County of Dampier	
Moruya Aboriginal Reserve	AR 90,560	29/11/1974	?	Village of Mogo	Parish of Goba, County of St Vincent	
Mossgiel Aboriginal Reserve	AR 41,386/7	27/2/1907	17/12/1937	40 acres	Parish of Carowra, County of Mossgiel	
Mossgiel Aboriginal Reserve	AR 41,384/5	27/2/1907	17/12/1937	230 acres	Parish of Carowra, County of Mossgiel	
Moulamein Aboriginal Reserve	AR 85,795	3/5/1966	22/08/1975	a cemetery	Parish of Moulamein, County of Wakool	
Moulamein Aboriginal Reserve	AR 86,526	11/1/1967	?		Parish of Moulamein, County of Wakool	
Mullumbimby Aboriginal Reserve	AR 14,606	10/10/1891	22/12/1915		Parish of Brunswick, County of Rous	
Mungindi Aboriginal Reserve	AR 28,403	29/10/1898	22/3/1929	100 acres	Parish of Yarouah, County of Benarba	
Mungindi Aboriginal Reserve	AR 80,927 AR 80,928	8/8/1958	4/10/1974	5 acres	Parish of Yarouah, County of Benarba	
Murrin Bridge Aboriginal Reserve	AR 71,163	25/2/1944	12/3/1948	on the Lachlan River	Parish of Eribendery, County of Blaxland	
Murwillumbah Aboriginal Reserve	AR 83,787	6/04/1962	27/09/1973		Parish of Cudgen, County of Rous	

== N ==
Reserve	Gazette number	Date gazetted	Date revoked	Notes	Parish and county	References
Nambucca Heads Aboriginal Reserve	AR 140	14/5/1883	22/4/1922	Stewart's Island or Brushy Island	Parish of Nambucca, County of Raleigh	
Nambucca Heads Aboriginal Reserve	AR 19,667	17/2/1894	2/11/1962	25 acres	Parish of Nambucca, County of Raleigh	
Nambucca Heads Aboriginal Reserve	AR 31,243/4	17/2/1894	4/4/1952	40 acres	Parish of Nambucca, County of Raleigh	
Nanima Aboriginal Reserve	AR 45,426/7	29/6/1910	8/08/1975	included AR 87,975 in the Wellington area	Parish of Wellington, County of Wellington	
Nanima Aboriginal Reserve	AR 80,144	22/1/1957	31/8/1964	20 acres near Spring Flat	Parish of Wellington, County of Wellington	
Narrabri Aboriginal Reserve	AR 28,093	3/9/1898	11/6/1920	800 acres	Parish of Cooma, County of White	
Narrabri Aboriginal Reserve	AR 83,416	1/9/1961	?	2 acres	Parish of Cooma, County of White	
Narrabri Aboriginal Reserve	AR 3,274	25/5/1901	12/4/1918	800 acres	Parish of Baan Baa, County of Pottinger	
Nowendoc Aboriginal Reserve	AR 68,391	9/6/1939	E?	Walcha district	Parish of Ward, County of Hawes	
Nowra Aboriginal Reserve	AR 31,442	8/9/1900	?	located at Roseby Park	Parish of Wollumboola, County of St Vincent	
Nowra Aboriginal Reserve (Seven Mile)	AR 29,911	23/9/1899	25/1/1953	43 acres	Parish of Coolangatta, County of Camden	

== O ==
Reserve	Gazette number	Date gazetted	Date revoked	Notes	Parish and county	References
Oban River Aboriginal Reserve	AR 17,553	15/4/1893	19/8/1927	Oban River near Ward's Mistake, east of Guyra	Parish of Oban, County of Clarke	
Oban River Aboriginal Reserve (Tim's Gully)	AR 44,560	17/11/1909	19/8/1927	215 acres	Parish of Oban, County of Clarke	
Orara Aboriginal Reserve	AR 4,164	17/9/1887	?	Grafton area	County of Fitzroy, Parish of Moonee	

== P ==
Reserve	Gazette number	Date gazetted	Date revoked	Notes	Parish and county	References
Parkes Aboriginal Reserve	AR 86,785	28/06/1968	20/09/1974		Parish of Mingello, County of Narromine	
Peak Hill Aboriginal Reserve	AR 31,195	14/7/1900	3/7/1912	30 acres	Parish of Mingello, County of Narromine	
Peak Hill Aboriginal Reserve	AR 85,081	6/11/1964	20/09/1974		Parish of Mingello, County of Narromine	
Peak Hill Aboriginal Reserve	AR 8,678	28/6/1968	?		Parish of Mingello, County of Narromine	
Picton Aboriginal Reserve	AR 26	9/12/1878	19/4/1942	300 acres	Parish of the Peaks, County of Westmoreland	
Picton Aboriginal Reserve	AR 27	9/12/1878	1928	100 acres	Parish of the Peaks, County of Westmoreland	
Picton Aboriginal Reserve	AR 14,937	19/12/1891	22/9/1954	50 acres	Parish of the Peaks, County of Westmoreland	
Picton Aboriginal Reserve	AR 40,798	15/8/1906	24/9/1954	277 acres	Parish of the Peaks, County of Westmoreland	
Pilliga Aboriginal Reserve	AR 33,753/4	18/1/1902	30/10/1959	60 acres on Bubbo Creek	Parish of Talluba, County of Baradine	
Pilliga Aboriginal Reserve	AR 42,571/2	25/3/1908	30/10/1959		Parish of Talluba, County of Baradine	
Pooncarie Aboriginal Reserve	AR 44,656	22/12/1909	10/5/1946	re-registered as AR 48942 on 11/6/1913	Parishes of Pooncarie and Timpunga, County of Perry	
Portland Aboriginal Reserve	AR 23,598	25/3/1896	17/5/1946	150 acres	Parish of Meehan, County of Cook	
Portland Aboriginal Reserve	AR 28,546	26/11/1898	17/5/1946	40 acres	Parish of Meehan, County of Cook	
Port Macquarie Aboriginal Reserve	AR 19,681	17/2/1894	28/10/1921		Parish of Killawarra, County of Macquarie	
Port Macquarie Aboriginal Reserve	AR 40,391	4/4/1906	16/9/1960	10 acres	Parish of Killawarra, County of Macquarie	
Port Macquarie Aboriginal Reserve	AR 19,474	13/01/1894	?	10 acres on Wilson River	Parish of Cairncross, County of Macquarie	
Port Macquarie Aboriginal Reserve	AR 3,167	12/03/1887	?		Parish of Cairncross, County of Macquarie	
Port Macquarie Aboriginal Reserve	AR 3,994	27/08/1887	26/07/1974	30 acres	Parish of Cairncross, County of Macquarie	
Port Macquarie Aboriginal Reserve	AR 2,596	?	?		Parish of Cairncross, County of Macquarie	
Primbee Aboriginal Reserve	AR 78,373	2/3/1956	?	Illowra Crescent	Parish ofWollongong, County of Camden	
Purfleet Aboriginal Reserve	AR 31,598	6/8/1900	?	near Taree	Parish of Bohnock, County of Gloucester	
Purfleet Aboriginal Reserve	AR 64,070/1	21/7/1933	5/09/1975	Portion 25 revoked 1/12/1961	Parish of Bohnock, County of Gloucester	

== Q ==
Reserve	Gazette number	Date gazetted	Date revoked	Notes	Parish and county	References
Quambone Aboriginal Reserve	AR 63,088	11/12/1931	22/08/1975	later registered as AR 82,413	Parish of Mobal, County of Gregory	
Queanbeyan Aboriginal Reserve	AR 23,076	19/10/1895	1898	within Cuppacumbalong Holding near Naas Creek	Parish of Cuppacumbalong, County of Cowley	
Quirindi Aboriginal Reserve	AR 84,767	21/2/1964	?		Parish of Quirindi, County of Buckland	

== R ==
Reserve	Gazette number	Date gazetted	Date revoked	Notes	Parish and county	References
Rollands Plains Aboriginal Reserve	AR 2,598	30/10/1886	27/5/1960	Wauchope area	Parish of Cogo, County of Macquarie	
Roseby Park Aboriginal Reserve	AR 31,442	8/9/1902	?		Parish of Wollumboola, County of St Vincent	
Roseby Park Aboriginal Reserve	AR 42,274	18/12/1907	?		Parish of Wollumboola, County of St Vincent	

== S ==
Reserve	Gazette number	Date gazetted	Date revoked	Notes	Parish and county	References
Sackville Reach Aboriginal Reserve	AR 23,957	25/3/1896	15/12/1900	near Windsor	Parish of Meehan, County of Cook	
Sackville Reach Aboriginal Reserve	AR 23,958	25/3/1896	17/5/1946	near Windsor	Parish of Meehan, County of Cook	
Sackville Reach Aboriginal Reserve	AR 28,546	26/11/1898	17/5/1946	near Windsor	Parish of Meehan, County of Cook	
St Clare Aboriginal Reserve	AR 18,034	1/7/1893	22/8/1896	Hunter Valley area	Parish of Shenstone, County of Durham	
Southgate Aboriginal Reserve	AR 29,829	2/9/1899	13/5/1921		Parish of Southgate, County of Clarence	
South West Rocks Aboriginal Reserve	AR 63,426 / AR 63,427	8/7/1932	?	town of Arakoon	Parish of Arakoon, County of Macquarie	
South West Rocks Aboriginal Reserve	AR 82,168	20/11/1959	26/07/1974		Parish of Arakoon, County of Macquarie	

== T ==
Reserve	Gazette number	Date gazetted	Date revoked	Notes	Parish and county	References
Tenterfield Aboriginal Reserve	AR 86,307	9/6/1967	2/8/1974	also called Leech's Gully Reserve	Parish of Tenterfield, County of Clive	
Terania Creek Aboriginal Reserve	AR 2,959	15/1/1887	28/8/1925	near Lismore	Parish of Blakebrook, County of Rous	
Terry-Hie-Hie Aboriginal Reserve	AR 22,505 / AR 22,506	25/5/1895	?	on Wee Waa Creek	Parish of Moree, County of Courallie	
Terry-Hie-Hie Aboriginal Reserve	AR 43,581	19/5/1909	?	cemetery	Parish of Moree, County of Courallie	
Tibooburra Aboriginal Reserve	AR 1,993	9/2/1937	?	includes Milparinka AR 66,592 and AR 66,593	Parish of Hermitage, County of Tongowoko	
Tingha Aboriginal Reserve (Sutherland Waters)	AR 64,833	17/9/1954	?	Mooki/Bassendeen	Parish of Darby, County of Hardinge	
Toomelah Aboriginal Reserve	AR 66,833 AR 66,834	2/7/1937	4/10/1974	Boggabilla area	Parish of Merriwa, County of Stapleton	
Trial Bay Aboriginal Reserve	AR 217	5/11/1883	?		Parish of Arakoon, County of Macquarie	
Tinonee (Turonee) Aboriginal Reserve	AR 13,011	29/11/1890	?	in the township of Tinonee near Taree	Parish of Tinonee, County of Gloucester	
Tuncester Aboriginal Reserve				See Cubawee		

== U ==
Reserve	Gazette number	Date gazetted	Date revoked	Notes	Parish and county	References
Ulgundahi Island Aboriginal Reserve	AR 38,639	10/12/1904	?	near Maclean	Parish of Harwood, County of Clarence	
Ulgundahi Island Aboriginal Reserve	AR 41,619	8/5/1907	?	35 acres near Maclean	Parish of Harwood, County of Clarence	
Uralla Aboriginal Reserve	AR 25,220/1	12/12/1896	12/12/1924	100 acres on Kentucky Creek	Parish of Uralla, County of Sandon	
Uralla Aboriginal Reserve	AR 67,856/7	26/8/1938	18/07/1975	an Aboriginal cemetery on 9 acres	Parish of Uralla, County of Sandon	
Uralla Aboriginal Reserve	AR 85,414	30/7/1965	9/08/1974	2 acres	Parish of Uralla, County of Sandon	

== W ==
Reserve	Gazette number	Date gazetted	Date revoked	Notes	Parish and county	References
Walcha Aboriginal Reserve (Summervale)	AR 3	16/1/1886	present	re-registered as AR 81,426 on 27/2/1959	Parish of Walcha, County of Vernon	
Walgett Aboriginal Reserve	AR 67,377	18/02/1938	3/11/1939		Parish of Collarindabri, County of Finch	
Walgett Aboriginal Reserve	AR 75,350	26/9/1952	26/07/1974	106 acres	Parish of Walgett, County of Baradine	
Walgett Aboriginal Reserve	AR 9,656	14/9/1889	?	within the boundaries of Ulambie Holding	Parish of Walgett, County of Baradine	
Walgett Aboriginal Reserve	AR 79,550 / AR 79,551	3/5/1957	?		Parish of Walgett, County of Baradine	
Walgett Aboriginal Reserve	AR 82,141 AR 82,142	13/11/1959	20/09/1974		Parish of Walgett, County of Baradine	
Walgett Aboriginal Reserve	AR 83,809	19/4/1962	20/09/1974		Parish of Walgett, County of Baradine	
Walgett Aboriginal Reserve	AR 86,741	17/5/1968	20/09/1974	Allotment II section 23 revoked 18/06/1971	Parish of Walgett, County of Baradine	
Walgett Aboriginal Reserve	AR 68,969	26/1/1940	28/11/1975		Parish of Pokataroo, County of Denham	
Wallaga Lake Aboriginal Reserve	AR 13,939	13/6/1891	?		Parish of Narooma, County of Dampier	
Wallaga Lake Aboriginal Reserve (Snake Island)	AR 40,698	4/7/1906	?		Parish of Bermaguee, County of Dampier	
Wallaga Lake Aboriginal Reserve (Merriman Island)	AR 43,648	3/3/1909	31/12/1931		Parish of Bermaguee, County of Dampier	
Wanaaring Aboriginal Reserve	AR 81,037	29/8/1958	?		Parish of Wanaaring, County of Ularara	
Wanaaring Aboriginal Reserve	AR 86,633	7/6/1968	?		Parish of Wanaaring, County of Ularara	
Wantabadgery Aboriginal Reserve	AR 37,729	28/5/1904	9/1/1925	near the Murrumbidgee River	Parish of Wantabadgery, County of Clarendon	
Wantabadgery Aboriginal Reserve	AR 46,116	21/2/1910	9/1/1925	near the Murrumbidgee River	Parish of Wantabadgery, County of Clarendon	
Warangesda Aboriginal Reserve	AR 2,684	6/12/1880	16/4/1926	near Darlington Point, also referred to as an Aboriginal station	Parish of Waddi, County of Boyd	
Warangesda Aboriginal Reserve	AR 3,160	21/12/1883	16/4/1926	near Darlington Point, also referred to as an Aboriginal station	Parish of Waddi, County of Boyd	
Warren Aboriginal Reserve	AR 32,752	18/5/1901	18/8/1922	on the Bulgerara Creek	Parish of Gregory, County of Ninia	
Warren Aboriginal Reserve	AR 81,167	24/10/1958	?	on the Bulgerara Creek	Parish of Warren, County of Oxley	
Wee Waa Aboriginal Reserve	AR 19,783	1/9/1894	26/9/1975	re-registered in 1971	Parish of WeeWaa, County of White	
Wee Waa Aboriginal Reserve	AR 37,420	12/3/1904	31/3/1939	at the junction of Coghill Creek and the Namoi River	Parish of Bulgarra, County of White	
Wilberforce Aboriginal Reserve	AR 22,502	25/5/1895	?	In lieu of AR 9,856 and AR 9,857 notified 18/9/1889 and revoked 25/5/1895	Parish of Wilberforce, County of Cook	
Wilcannia Aboriginal Reserve	AR 64,562	25/05/1934	?	Approx 1,000 acres	Parish of Blenheim, County of Livingstone	
Wilcannia Aboriginal Reserve	AR 89,518	25/7/1975	?	about 43 hectares	Parish of Wilcannia, County of Young	
Wilcannia Aboriginal Reserve	AR 73,514	?	5/5/1950		Parish of Wilcannia, County of Young	
Wilcannia Aboriginal Reserve	AR 75,222	25/07/1952	25/07/1975		Parish of Wilcannia, County of Young	
Wilcannia Aboriginal Reserve	AR 89,531	8/8/1975	12/3/1976		Parish of Blenheim, County of Livingstone	
Wingham Aboriginal Reserve	AR 19,681	19/3/1920	?	80 acres	Parish of Killawara, County of Macquarie	
Wirajarai Aboriginal Reserve	AR 72,574 / AR 72,575	24/12/1947	20/09/1974	Moree area	Parish of Moree, County of Courallie	

== Y ==
Reserve	Gazette number	Date gazetted	Date revoked	Notes	Parish and county	References
Yamba Aboriginal Reserve	AR 2,955	15/1/1887	31/1/1958	Wooloweyah Estuary on 180 acres	Parish of Yamba, County of Clarence	
Yamba Aboriginal Reserve	AR 85,628	21/6/1966	?		Parish of Yamba, County of Clarence	
Yass Aboriginal Reserve	AR 43	15/6/1875	16/1/1925	This reserve became part of AR 17624 and was located near Blakney Creek on 80 acres. It operated from 15/6/1875 to 16/1/1925. The reserve AR 17623/4 formed part of this also and occupied 187 acres. It functioned as an Aboriginal Reserve from 29/4/1893 to 16/1/1925.	Parish of Opton, County of King	
Yass Aboriginal Reserve	AR 9,537	17/8/1889	?	2.5 acres in lieu of part of the reserve 7,366	Parish of Yass, County of King	
Yass Aboriginal Reserve	AR 153	11/7/1881	2/8/1940	2 miles from Blakney Creek on 160 acres. This reserve operated from 11/7/1881 and again from 28/2/1883 until 2/8/1940.	Parish of Opton, County of King	
Yass Aboriginal Reserve	AR 3,758	11/6/1887	16/5/1924	AR 8,531 was also part of it and operated from 26/10/1895 to 10/11/1912.	Parish of Opton, County of King	
Yass Aboriginal Reserve	AR 23,106	9/2/1889	?	100 acres on Brickey's Creek and included AR 31,113	Parish of Boambolo, County of Murray	
Yass Aboriginal Reserve	AR 68,669 / 68,670	22/9/1939	29/3/1963		Parish of Hume, County of Murray	
Yass Aboriginal Reserve	AR 73,585	30/6/1950	4/10/1974	AR 73,583 was located within this reserve	Parish of Opton, County of King	
Yass Aboriginal Reserve	AR 75,320	15/9/1952	4/10/1974		Parish of Opton, County of King	
Yellow Rock Burials Aboriginal Reserve (Bellingen)	AR 83,153	28/4/1961	?	Set aside for the preservation of graves.	Parish of South Bellingen, County of Raleigh	

== See also ==
- Aboriginal reserve
- Indigenous Protected Area
- List of Aboriginal missions in New South Wales
