= Tuncester, New South Wales =

Locality in New South Wales near Lismore

Tuncester, formerly known as Tunstall, is a locality within the City of Lismore local government area in New South Wales, Australia. It lies around 5–7 km (3.1–4.3 mi) outside the main town of Lismore. It is known for its historical self-managed Aboriginal reserve known as Cubawee, which was led by Pastor Frank Roberts for most of its existence (1932–1965).

Tuncester lies on the traditional lands of the Bundjalung people, who inhabited the Richmond River area before European settlers arrived in the 1840s. It was named Tunstall after Tunstall Station, a pastoral lease taken up by amateur naturalist Augustus Adolphus Leycester and his business partner Robert Shaw in 1843, where they grazed cattle. In 1907 Tunstall was officially renamed Tuncester, a combination of Tunstall and Leycester. Leycester Creek runs through Tuncester.

== History ==
=== Tuncester ===
European settlement reached the Richmond River area in the 1840s, and from the 1860s, they cleared and fenced lands surrounding the town that the settlers created, and Aboriginal people in the area were forced to live in camps on the edge of town.

In 1843 Augustus Adolphus Leycester (Note: Also a keen amateur naturalist, botanist, taxidermist, entomologist, and carpenter, and a friend to Aboriginal people. He died in England in 1892. [May be worthy of an article owing to the story about the lyrebird. There is also a book called Pillars of earth : the story of Henry and Mary Garrard and Augustus Leycester (1985), by Margaret E. Timbrell and Margaret C. McKenna.) and Robert Shaw took up the pastoral lease over land which they called Tunstall, and created a cattle station. They had previously held a run called Maidenhead on the Severn River in New England, and herded their cattle overland to Tunstall via Woodenbong and Urbenville. The property was described in the New South Wales Government Gazette as covering an area of around 19,200 acres (7,800 ha), capable of grazing 1200 cattle. Its northern boundary was Duck Creek (now Leycester Creek), and it was surrounded by other stations. There was a boundary dispute in 1847 with neighbour Alfred Ward Stephens, who lived on a property called Runnymede, with both men claiming "a large, fertile plain" between the two. Shaw left, and Leycester eventually sold the property to Henry Garrard in 1849. Leycester remained as manager of Tunstall until 1850, before heading to California. He returned to New South Wales at some point, and in April 1859, with the help of Aboriginal man Davy, claimed to have retrieved the first egg of a rare type of lyrebird, Menura alberti. He had previously (in 1844) shot one of the birds, but did not realise that it was a new species at that point. He also wrote a detailed description of Menura alberti and its habits, which was later reproduced by an English scientist in a book of birds. However, ornithologist John Gould somehow managed to get a specimen to London before Leycester, so he was given no credit for the discovery. Leycester married widow Jemima Sophia Pritchard in Sydney in 1871, and died in England in 1892.

In 1886 the Campbell brothers were running around 2000 head on Tunstall Station, with the homestead on Leycester Creek. One of the brothers was John Campbell. His son Malcolm Lamont Campbell was born in 1875, and had to walk through scrub to get to school. Malcolm later bought another property in the location known as Tunstall, and died in 1936.

Another of the founding settler families in the location were the Bibo family. In 1873, Anton and Rosina Bibo and their three children arrived in Australia on the SS Great Britain, and settled in Tunstall (Tuncester), where they planted vineyards and made wine.

The name change to Tuncester was announced by the deputy postmaster-general on 4 February 1907, with the railway station and the post office taking on the new names soon afterwards. The Winsome Hotel is mentioned as being in existence at this time, with talk of a blacksmith and a store. It was reported that the Hon. Thomas Thomson Ewing had said that the name was derived by combining Tunstall and Leycester, both of which were already in use in the Commonwealth. The Northern Star regretted that it could not be called Leycester was not available, as it would have perpetuated the name of A. A. Leycester, a "fine type of colonist". The newspaper said that it would otherwise have preferred to adopt the Aboriginal name of a nearby location.

The Tuncester Progress Association (formerly Tunstall Progress Association) was in existence by 1907, and celebrated the third anniversary of the Tuncester Methodist Church. In 1909 the mail service referred to the location as "Tuncester (Tunstall)".

Tunstall Public School was renamed Tuncester School. In 1907 it catered for 36 students, but there were many complaints that it was too hot for the children owing to poor ventilation.

The Government of New South Wales created Aboriginal reserves and in 1908, and some of the people in camps were moved to Dunoon Aboriginal Reserve at Modanville, where they were able to live independently. After the reserve was converted into an agricultural station run by white people in the 1920s, many residents began returning to the town camps, and Dunoon closed in 1929.

In 1973, the "Tuncester School for Specific Purposes" was established in 1973 for children with special needs. It was closed in 1979.

A Tooth's brewery was built in Tuncester around 1979. It closed around 1987 and was later converted into a factory.

A railway line once passed through Tuncester, but it fell into disuse. The station was situated between Leycester and Lismore, on the Casino–Lismore–Murwillumbah railway line Line, which opened in 1894 and was last used in 2004. Tuncester station opened on 19 October 1903 as Tunstall, and was renamed a few years later on 1 April 1907 as Tuncester. It was closed on 31 March 1976.

After devastating floods in 2022, many roads around Lismore have been rebuilt or improved. The Walsh Bridge on Rosehill Road at Tuncester, formerly a wooden bridge, has been rebuilt in concrete, to better withstand flooding.

=== Cubawee ===
After white townspeople objected to their presence in the town, in 1931 the government moved the Aboriginal people from the camps in North Lismore to a new reserve at Tuncester, around 7 km (4.3 mi) away. The new residents renamed the reserve "Cubawee", meaning "place of full and plenty" (or "plentiful food") in the Bundjalung language. (Note: The word was transcribed in a 1912 newspaper article as "Cobiwoy".) The land comprised around 5–6 acres (2.0–2.4 ha) of land with river access (Leycester Creek), carved out from land used by travelling stock, granted by the Pastures Protection Board under an arrangement with the Aborigines Protection Board. The official name was Tuncester Reserve.

Tuncester Reserve, or Cubawee, was a self-managed Aboriginal settlement from 1932 until 1965, situated in the land of the Bundjalung people. The residents experienced a lot of racism from the townspeople, including having to stand up on the school bus. Aboriginal people who did not want to be governed by white managers on stations and reserves found their way to Cubawee, and Pastor Frank Roberts later recruited some of these people to the Aborigines Progressive Association.

Cubawee School was in existence in 1932. The first wedding took place in the new church at Cubawee in July 1935, when Grace Roberts married Clem Ritchie.

From 1937 (or earlier? it was run by Frank Roberts (1899–1968), who had become an evangelical Christian under the United Aborigines Mission before moving from Cabbage Tree Island to Cubawee. Frank Snr's son, Frank Roberts Jnr, was also a pastor, and his daughter was Rhoda Roberts (1959–2026).

In March 1939 it was reported that George Gollan, then Chief Secretary of New South Wales, wanted to close down the reserve owing to "rampant vice". He said that a new Aborigines Protection Board would soon be reconstituted under special legislation to be introduced into parliament, as there was no manager in charge of the reserve. In November 1939, the Aborigines Protection Board announced that it would not be building more homes at Tuncester Reserve owing to shortage of funds.

In 1940 Pastor Roberts and his eldest son organised a Christian convention at Cubawee, in which hundreds of people participated. This became an annual event.

In June 1950, Lismore police and public health officials, who supported Pastor Roberts, criticised the Aboriginal Protection Board for allowing the reserve to fall into neglect. The Northern Star reported that the approximately 120 inhabitants of the reserve lived in 13 broken down "hutments", sometimes three families under one roof, on the 18-acre (7.3 ha) reserve. They were forced to get their drinking water from a stream polluted by cattle, and there were fears that disease could break out. Men were working on nearby farms, of which many were owned by Italian immigrants, for a wage of 18 shillings a day, when the basic wage was at that time £1/7/6 (one pound, 7 shillings and sixpence). Roberts criticised the board for giving the people on the reserve the minimum assistance, and not providing sufficiently for the education of children.

In 1955, Roberts wrote to The Northern Star to protest a planned proposal of Cubawee residents to Modanville. In his letter, he stated that the current residents were former residents of North Lismore and Wyrallah, not Modanville. Their original campsite was now the location of a sawmill. His grandfather, John Bob Roberts, was chief of the local Bundjalung tribe, and his father, Lyle Roberts, had never lived in Modanville. He also wrote that the recent grant of an additional three acres was not given by the Welfare Board, but through the residents appealing to the Minister for Lands, and mentions a railway siding at the reserve.

Two families were prominent at Cubawee: the Torrens and Roberts families. The residents at Cubawee were eventually forced from their homes owing to flooding of the area in 1964, but the people later continued to try to get their land back. People later recalled having had happy times living in Cubawee, despite the very basic conditions and houses with dirt floors.

Frank Roberts Snr went on to serve on the Anglican Board of Missions from 1968 until 1974, and advocated for the rights of Aboriginal people at a meeting in Sydney in 1970.

In 2010, the land was returned to the Ngulingah Aboriginal Land Council (a LALC).

On 7 May 2010, Cubawee was pronounced an Aboriginal Place under the NSW National Parks and Wildlife Act 1974.

== Location and facilities ==
Tuncester is about 5 km (3.1 mi) from the edge of the town of Lismore, separated from it by large paddocks.

Lismore South Public School serves South Lismore, Tuncester, and several surrounding localities.
