= Northern Rivers temporary housing =

Homes built after floods in Australia

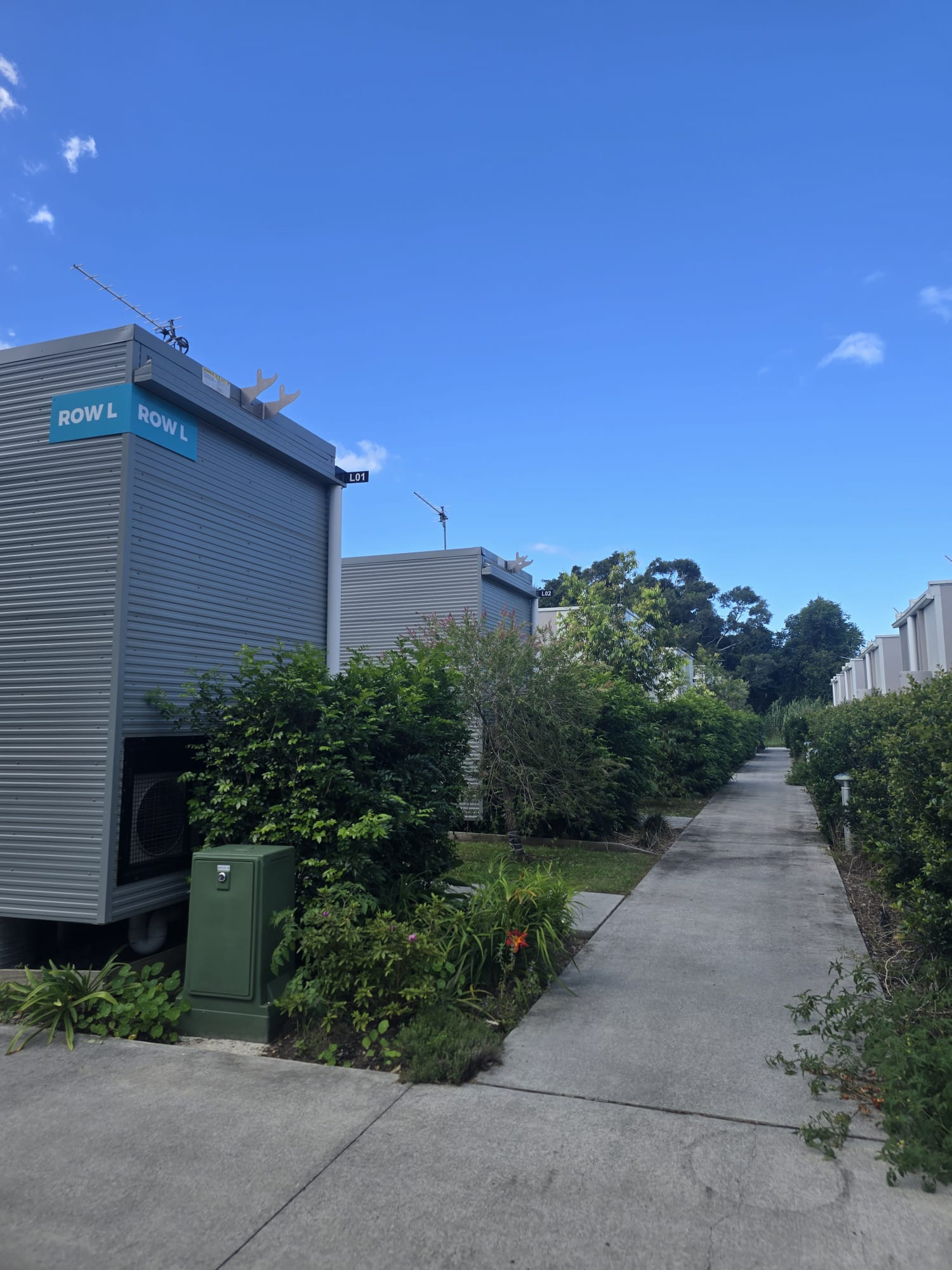
A row of 'pods' at the Brunswick Heads temporary housing village

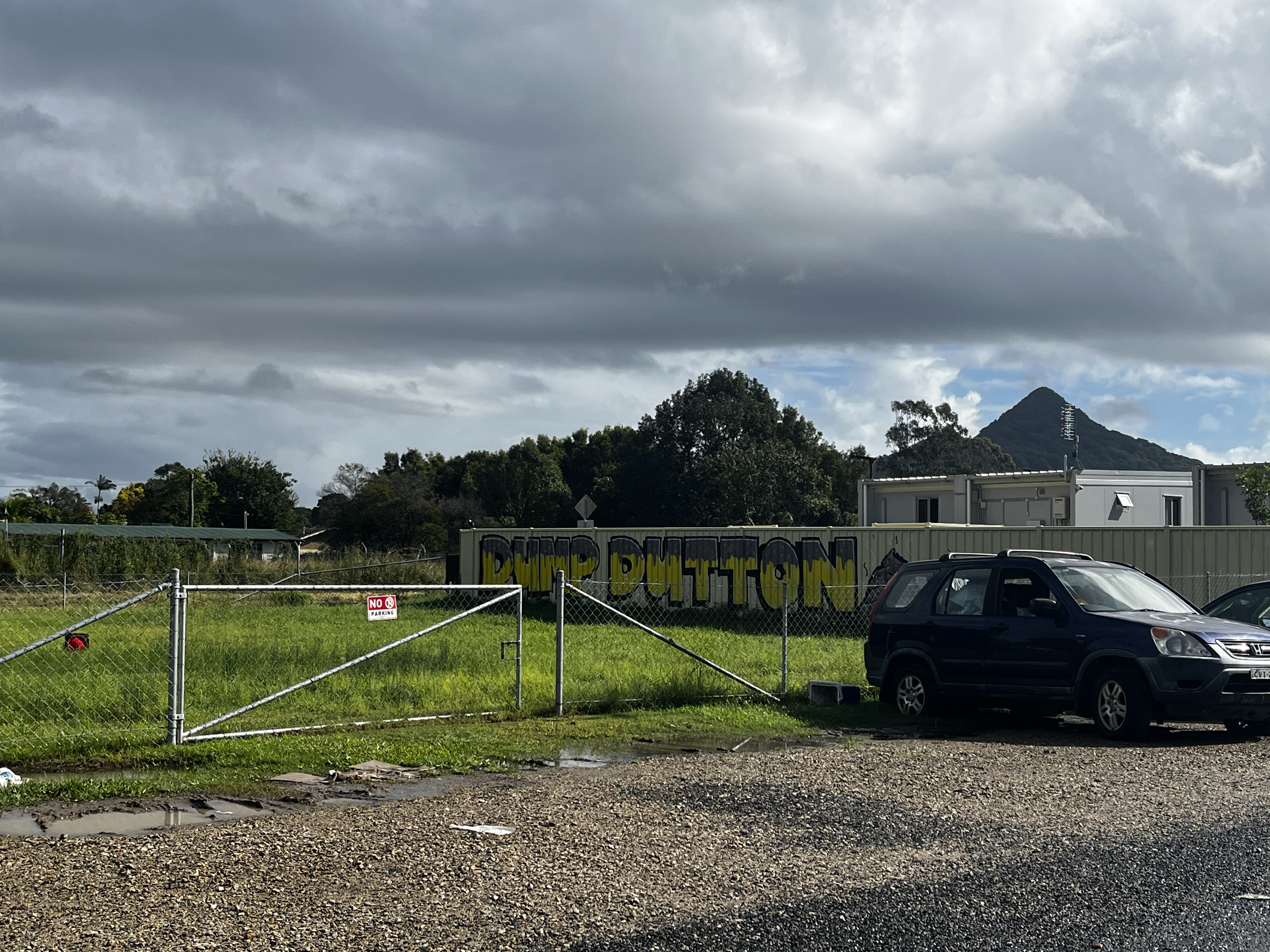
The Mullumbimby temporary housing village (pod village) in 2025

Northern Rivers temporary housing, often referred to as pod villages, where developed in the Northern Rivers region of New South Wales following the 2022 eastern Australia floods.

They are designed to be temporary housing to provide safe and secure housing for people affected by these floods in which many lost their homes.

== Background ==
The temporary housing takes the form of modular homes, often referred to as 'pods', which are stand alone homes which vary in size and configuration; some also include caravans. There are also various instances of infrastructure and amenities included at the sites although what is provided varies by location.

A total of 546 dwellings were constructed, including 64 caravans, which - shortly after they opened - were housing over 2,000 people. Despite the number of people housed it was identified by the NSW Audit Office that, after their creation, there were still 724 households on the waitlist for temporary housing in the region. They also found that many people remained either in their flood damaged homes or in unsuitable emergency accommodation.

The villages were constructed in by NSW Public Works who, along with completing much of the work also used and trained inmates at a number of local correctional facilities to construct 100 of the homes. Some communities were unsupportive of the program and did not want these villages so close to them.

Local community housing provides, such as Northern Rivers Housing, UnitingCare and Aboriginal Community Housing Limited, manage the sites in partnership with the NSW Government, local councils and other community groups.

The program was due to end in June 2025 but most of the pod villages remain in place due to the lack of affordable housing in the region and the ongoing recovery from the floods. Many have been extended until December 2026 and all must by decommissioned within 5 years of their establishment.

The need for their removal is, in part, due to the short term nature of the sites provided with local councils and landowners having made arrangements under crisis accommodation planning exemptions. Some of the sites being used are on land subject to flooding and, in addition to this risk to resident, there are concerns that their presence could lead to increased risk of flooding by their immediate neighbours. Additionally, many of the pod villages were built of sites previously used as sports fields or recreation and for some, like in Wardell, there has been community backlash about their extension.

There are concerns that the removal of the pods could leave thousands of displaced people unhoused but there has also been criticism that many of the people living in the villages were not directly flood affected and that some residents have violent criminal histories. There also are accusations about ongoing violence at many of the sites and that this endangers both residents and staff; despite this a number of local police districts state that there were no major problems at the pods and that they did not increase their workload.

== Locations ==
There are pod villages in the following suburbs within the Northern Rivers:

- Ballina
- Brunswick Heads (there are two located here)
- East Lismore
- Evans Head
- Kingscliff (closed in September 2025)
- Mullumbimby
- Pottsville
- Wardell (this site includes people evacuated from Cabbage Tree Island)
- Wollongbar (closed in March 2025)
