= Frank Roberts (pastor) =

(1899-1968) Bundjalung pastor

Frank Roberts (c. 1899 - 21 June 1968) was a Bundjalung pastor who spent much of his life at the Aboriginal reserves that were established at Cabbage Tree Island and Tuncester. The reserve at Tuncester became known as Cubawee Reserve and he was the pastor-in-charge there from 1937 until his retirement in 1956.

Roberts was also an Indigenous rights activist and a member of the Aborigines' Progressive Association. He spent his life campaigning for the rights of his people and was often frustrated by mistreatment by the Australian government, the Aborigines Protection Board, and the United Aborigines Mission who he worked for.

== Biography ==
Roberts was born around 1899 at Blakebrook, near Lismore, in the Northern Rivers region of New South Wales. He was the eldest child of Lyle and Bella (née Davis) who went on to have fourteen further children. His parents were both Bundjalung people and, because of this, Roberts was taught at a segregated school at Cabbage Tree Island which was then designated as an Aboriginal reserve.

After completing his schooling Roberts worked as a labourer and, on 13 August 1918, married Dorothy Hart in Ballina. By 1925 the couple and their young children moved to Lismore were he was able to enrol the children in a public, unsegregated school, however, in 1928 they were forced to return to Cabbage Tree Island when segregation was reintroduced. In 1933, while there, Roberts became an evangelist within the community through the United Aborigines Mission (UAM). For many years Roberts was recognised as a 'native helper' and later 'native evangelist'.

Roberts experienced difficulties at Cabbage Tree Island and, in describing this, his granddaughter Rhoda Roberts said he was "sick of being treated so badly". Rhoda recalled an incident that she had been told of in 1934 when he "walked" his and three other families off the island and, to be able to do so, had to sneak away after the manager was asleep.

In 1937, following an argument Roberts had with the manager there, the family moved again to Tuncester where Cubawee Reserve had been established. This reserve had originally been named Tuncester Reserve but the predominately Bundjalung and Widjabal people living there renamed it as Cubawee means 'place of full and plenty’ or 'plentiful food' and this name was formally recognised in 1947. Many of Roberts family were already at Cubawee and, upon arrival, Roberts and some of his family members, ran regular prayer meetings and more generally helped in the management of the reserve.

Cubawee was self managed, with limited government oversight, and Roberts fought their attempts to interfere as well as their attempts to force people to relocate to supervised reserves. This was particularly evident when the government threatened to close the school and remove children from their families.

Also in 1937 Roberts joined the Aborigines' Progressive Association (APA), and also encouraged other Bundjalung and Widjabul people to join. In 1937 the APA called for the Parliamentary Select Committee Inquiry into New South Wales Aborigines Protection Board 1937 which condemned the treatment of Aboriginal people by the board in, during the proceedings a letter from Roberts was read and he stated:

‘It is terrible. Words cannot express what is scandalous treatment by the Destruction Board…The Aborigines Protection Board made conditions so hard that I was forced to leave the settlement, and through persecution of the board…I am without a home.'

— Frank Roberts, via the Select Committee on Administration of Aborigines Protection Board, 1938

In 1938, as a member of the APA Roberts travelled to Sydney to take part in the 'Day of Mourning' protest which was the first of its kind. The Day of Mourning coincided with the 150th anniversary of the landing of the First Fleet and the protestors demanded full citizenship rights and equality within the community. He was among the key organisers.

In 1940, without the support of the UAM, Roberts organised a Christian convention at Cubawee and following hundreds of people coming along it became an annual event until the 1950s. Perhaps in recognition of this success Roberts was finally recognised as a pastor and officially named 'native pastor' in 1947. This made him the first recognised Aboriginal pastor, engaged in missionary work, in Australia. In February 1948 Roberts was made the caretaker of Cubawee.

Despite this Roberts, and many others at Cubawee, was frustrated and wanted to establish and autonomous Indigenous church without the involvement of the UAM. However, they were unable to make this happen due to a lack of funds. Roberts was also frustrated with the lack of assistance from the church an, in a 1950, letter to the editor expressing frustration about the lack of assistance following floods he stated:

'Surely this is another case of the rich man and Lazarus at the gate; yet we find the church today preaching the brotherhood of man. But when it comes to practical christianity the church is dead.'

— Frank Roberts, The Northern Star, 13 July 1950

Roberts retired from the UAM in 1956.

Despite advocacy by Roberts and other elders Cubawee was bulldozed in 1964 and its residents forced to move. Roberts returned to Lismore where, on 21 June 1968, he died.

== Family ==
Roberts is the father of Francis Roy Roberts (1945 – 2011), a boxer known as 'Honest Frank'.

He is the paternal grandfather of Rhoda Roberts (1959 – 2026).
