= Sackville Reach Aboriginal Reserve =

Sackville Reach Aboriginal Reserve was located on the Hawkesbury River near Windsor in New South Wales, established in 1889 by the NSW Aborigines Protection Board. The government of the colony of New South Wales gazetted and revoked land for this community in the Parish of Meehan, County of Cook gazetting AR 23,957 (25 March 1896 - 15 December 1900), AR 23,958 (25 March 1896 – 17 May 1946) and AR 28,546 (26 November 1898 – 17 May 1946).

The reserve was operated under the Aborigines Protection Board (1889–1940) and the Aborigines Welfare Board from 1940-1946.

The two main families on the reserve were the Everinghams and Barbers. Andrew Barber, the son of John Barber, a Darkinjung man, and his wife Ballandella, a Wiradjari woman, was the last resident at the Reserve.

There is some dispute over whether John Barber was Darug or Darkinjung. Kohen's research indicates that all Aborigines in the area were Darug, which was used by Brook in his book Shutout from the World. The original writings of R. H. Mathews lists John Barber and the Aborigines of Sackville as Darkinjung. The most thorough research by completed by Ford supports that John Barber and the aboriginals of Sackville were Darkinjung.

Several missionaries in charge supervised the reserve including Retta Dixon (1901–1903), Maud Oldrey (1903- ), Annie Lock, Emily Buttsworth (1906-) until the Protection Board ruled in 1910 that female missionaries could not live alone on reserves.

An obelisk memorial at the site of the reserve was established by Percy Gledhill and is inscribed ‘To the Aborigines of the Hawkesbury for whom this area was originally reserved’.

== See also ==
List of Aboriginal Reserves in New South Wales
