= Cabbage Tree Island, New South Wales =

Cabbage Tree Island
- Town
- Coordinates: 28°58′47″S 153°27′23″E
- Country: Australia
- State: New South Wales
- LGA: Ballina Shire

Government
  - State electorate: Ballina
  - Federal division: Page

Population
  - Total: 89 (SAL 2021)
- Postcode: 2477

Cabbage Tree Island is a locality in Ballina Shire located in the Northern Rivers Region of New South Wales. It is about 4 kilometres (2.5 mi) south of Wardell.

It was a predominantly Aboriginal community and is on the lands of the Bundjalung people. Much of the community was relocated off the island following the 2022 eastern Australia floods.

== Origin of place name ==
Colonialists named the island because of the presence of the cabbage-tree palm. However, the Bundjalung language name for this place is Monggongbin.

== Demographics ==
In the 2016 census, the population of Cabbage Tree Island was 78. In the 2021 census, it had increased to 89 persons.

== History ==
The island was reportedly settled by three Aboriginal pioneers in 1885 Yuke, Jack Roach and Jack "Poppa" Cook after they were displaced there by the police. Little is known of the first two of these men and it is unknown whether they remained on the island, however, Cook is acknowledged as an ancestor of many islanders today. The islanders engaged in cane farming and had their own food gardens, reportedly living self-sufficiently.

Many of the early homes there where constructed from cabbage-tree palms and many were removed to make room for cane farming and for sale as wood; there are few palms now remaining on the island.

In 1893 the island was designated an Aboriginal reserve, with Aboriginal people moving there (often by force) from throughout the region. This movement was also encouraged by the Cabbage Tree School opening in October 1893 although this was closed in January 1895 and was not reopened until June 1908.

In 1911 a government manager was installed, and the island was then run by various government Aboriginal welfare agencies until the mid-1970s. The manager's permission was required in some periods to leave the island. The welfare agencies provided regular food rations. Many of the islanders worked as cane cutters or other cane labourers. Young women often went to work as domestic servants in Sydney.

In the late twentieth century government management was transferred to a local Aboriginal land council, Jali Aboriginal Land Council (Jali LALC) which maintains the houses on the island. The school continued in operation.

== 2022 floods and 'closure' of community ==
Buildings were damaged by the 2022 floods and residents were moved to temporary housing pods in Wardell and Ballina. The school on the island was temporarily relocated to Wardell in November 2022 and, by March 2023, residents were frustrated by a lack of permission to return.

In September 2023, the Jali LALC, announced that the island homes would not be rebuilt, but the residents would be relocated to 26 new homes to be constructed in Wardell, due to "unacceptably high risk" from flood. Former residents on the islands were first placed in temporary accommodation in the form of a "pod village"; these are formally known as Northern Rivers temporary housing.

Many residents were upset by this decision and one local woman stated:

"If I move back to the island and I get flooded away, I get flooded away and I die, that's how much [Cabbage Tree Island] means to me."

— Fay Anderson, as quoted by ABC, 2023

In 2025 it was identified by Wade Charles that the flooding event, and response to it, illustrated systemic inequalities and how Aboriginal communities are overrepresented in disaster-affected areas and are then under resourced during response and recovery efforts. Charles believes this reflects historic and ongoing structural failures and that the forced removal severed ancestral ties and led to increased trauma from the flood.

== Facilities ==
As of 2026 the school, Cabbage Tree Island Public School, is in operation and has been relocated to Wardell and is being taught in demountable buildings.

== Notable people ==
- Frank Roberts (1899–1968), paternal grandfather of Rhoda Roberts, went to the segregated school there.
- Frank Roberts Jnr, father of Rhoda Roberts, grew up in the reserve

== Gallery ==
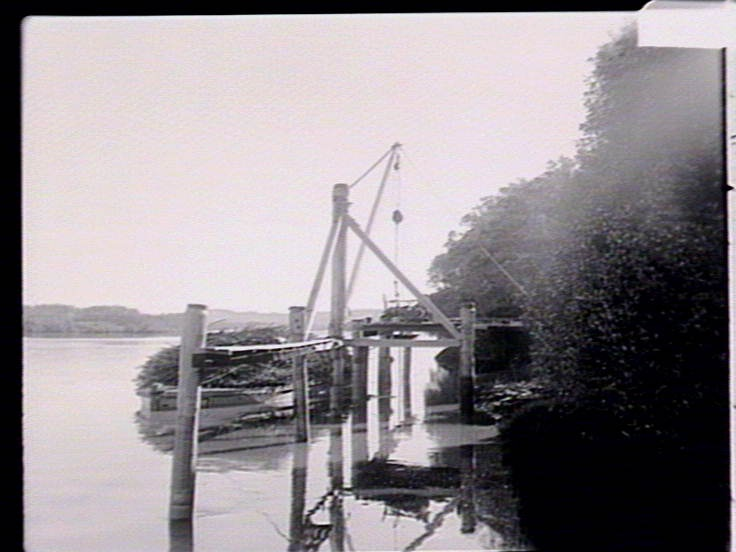
A boat moored at a jetty at Cabbage Tree Island in 1961

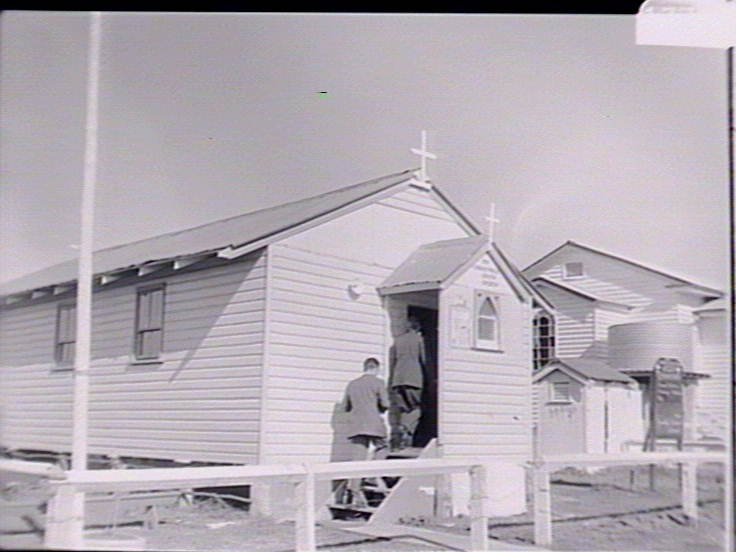
The church at Cabbage Tree Island in 1961

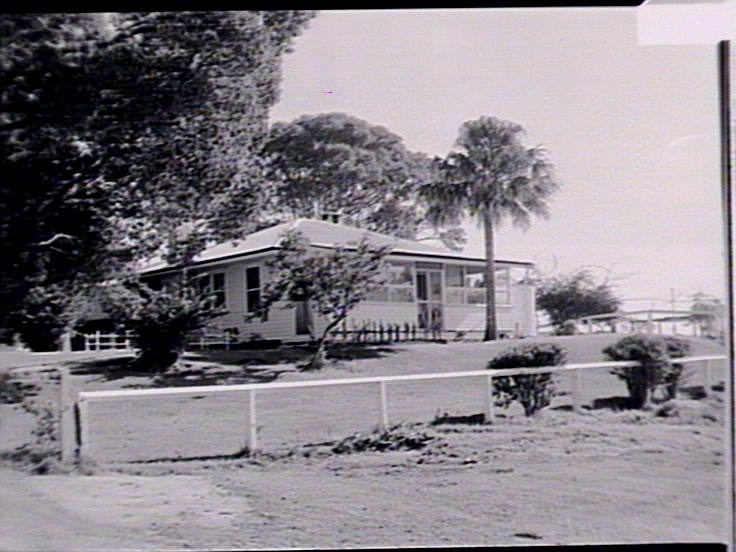
A home on Cabbage Tree Island in 1961

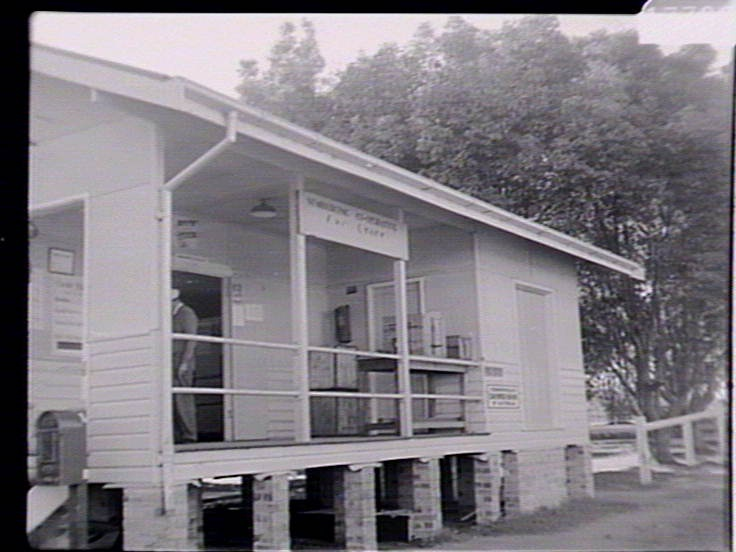
Unidentified community building at Cabbage Tree Island in 1961
