= 2022 eastern Australia floods =

February–April 2022 disaster in New South Wales and Queensland

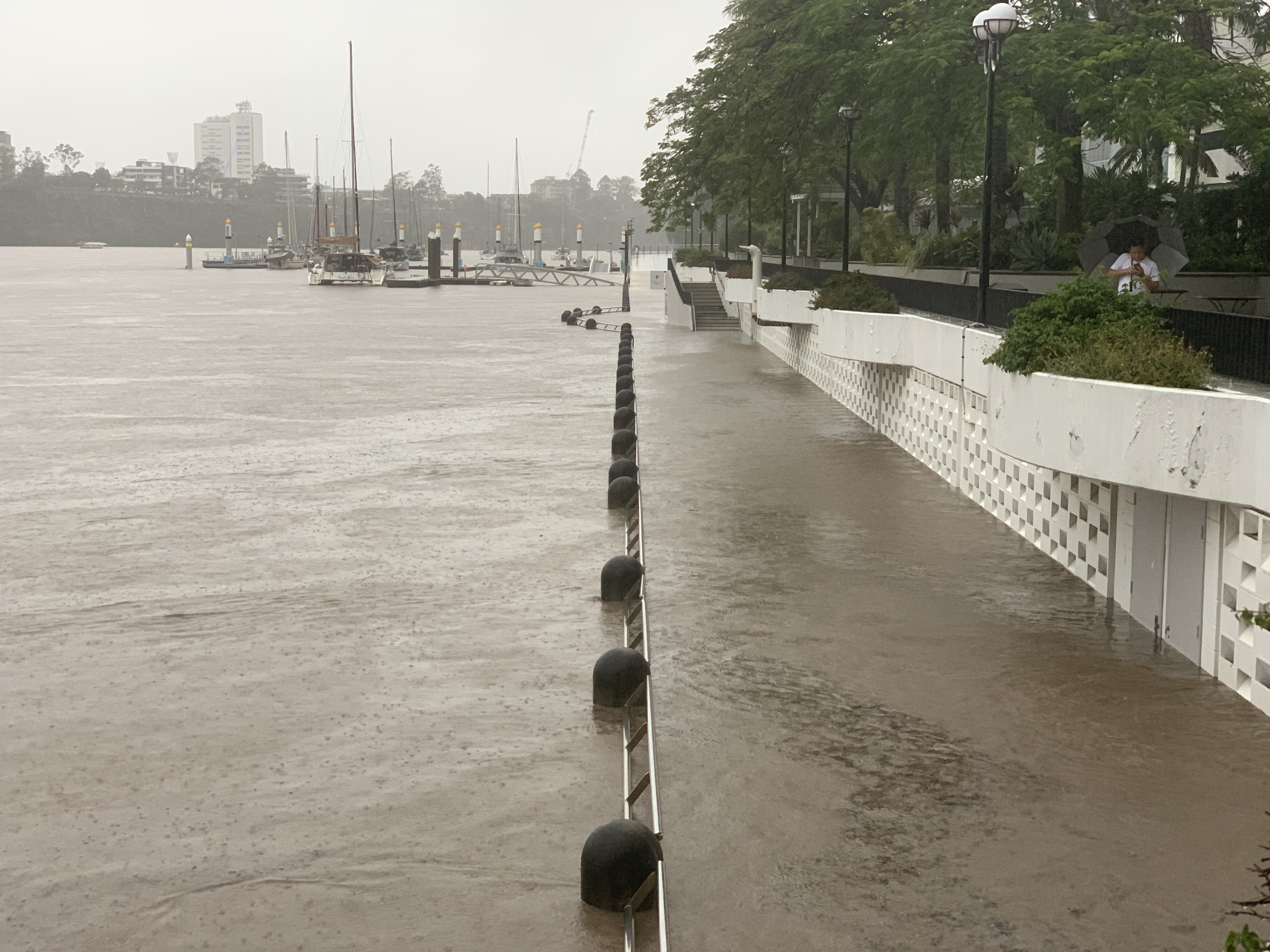
- Lower Riverwalk flooded in Brisbane
- Date: 23 February 2022 – 7 April 2022
- Location: South East Queensland, Wide Bay–Burnett, the Northern Rivers, Central Coast and Sydney
- Deaths: 27, 1 missing
- Property damage: A$7.7 billion (US$5.58 billion, Queensland alone); A$9.6 billion (US$6.6 billion)

One of Australia's worst recorded flood disasters occurred from late February to early May 2022 in South East Queensland, the Wide Bay–Burnett and parts of coastal New South Wales. Brisbane suffered major flooding, along with the cities of Maryborough, Gympie, the Sunshine Coast, Caboolture, Toowoomba, Gatton, Ipswich, Logan City, the Gold Coast, Murwillumbah, Mullumbimby, Grafton, Byron Bay, Ballina, Lismore, the Central Coast and parts of Sydney.

Twenty-four people are known to have died during the disaster. Throughout South East Queensland and the Wide Bay–Burnett, almost one thousand schools were closed in response to the flooding, evacuations took place and the public were advised to avoid non-essential travel. Food shortages were reported across the region, due to the ensuing supply chain crisis as well as affecting communities in outback Queensland.

The flooding caused the ground across South West Queensland and North Western New South Wales to become saturated and vulnerable to even small amounts of rain.

== Meteorology ==
Rainfall of over 400 millimetres (16 in) was recorded across the Northern Brisbane area. In the three days to 28 February, Northern Brisbane received 676.8 millimetres (26.65 in) of rainfall, the largest three- and seven-day total ever recorded in Brisbane. Mount Glorious received in excess of 1,770 millimetres (70 in) of rainfall in the weeks surrounding 28 February. The rainfall recorded was higher than the 1974 Brisbane flood, with 30 locations across the south-east recording at least 1,000 millimetres.

=== Cause ===
The flooding was the result of a low pressure system over Queensland's southern coast that dragged in moisture from the Coral Sea in the north, raising it over the Queensland coastline. The area of colder air higher in the atmosphere which the low-pressure system travelled in made the atmosphere unstable and permitted moisture to be lifted up and fall as rain. As the system headed south, it turned into an East Coast Low near the Central Coast and Sydney. Furthermore, around New Zealand, there existed an area of high pressure, which is an anti-clockwise rotating blocking high that obstructed the low pressure system from drifting away into the Tasman Sea.

== Impact ==
=== Brisbane ===
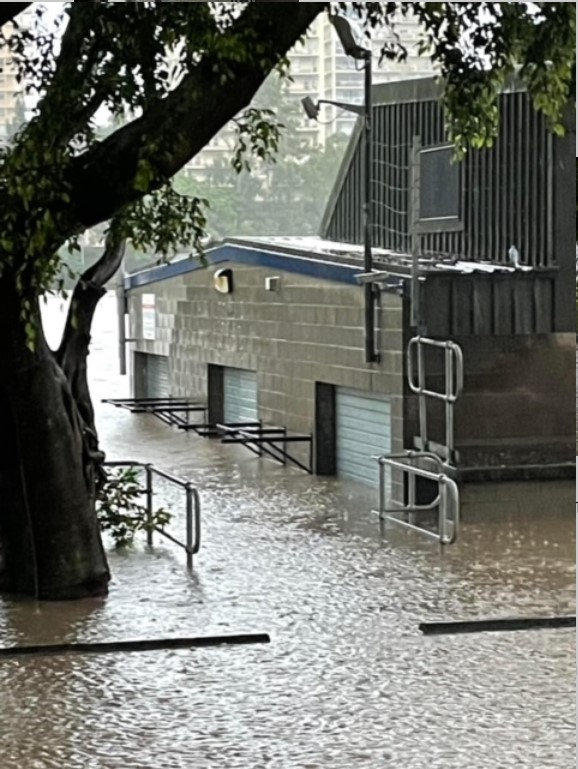
Rowing shed in West End, Brisbane

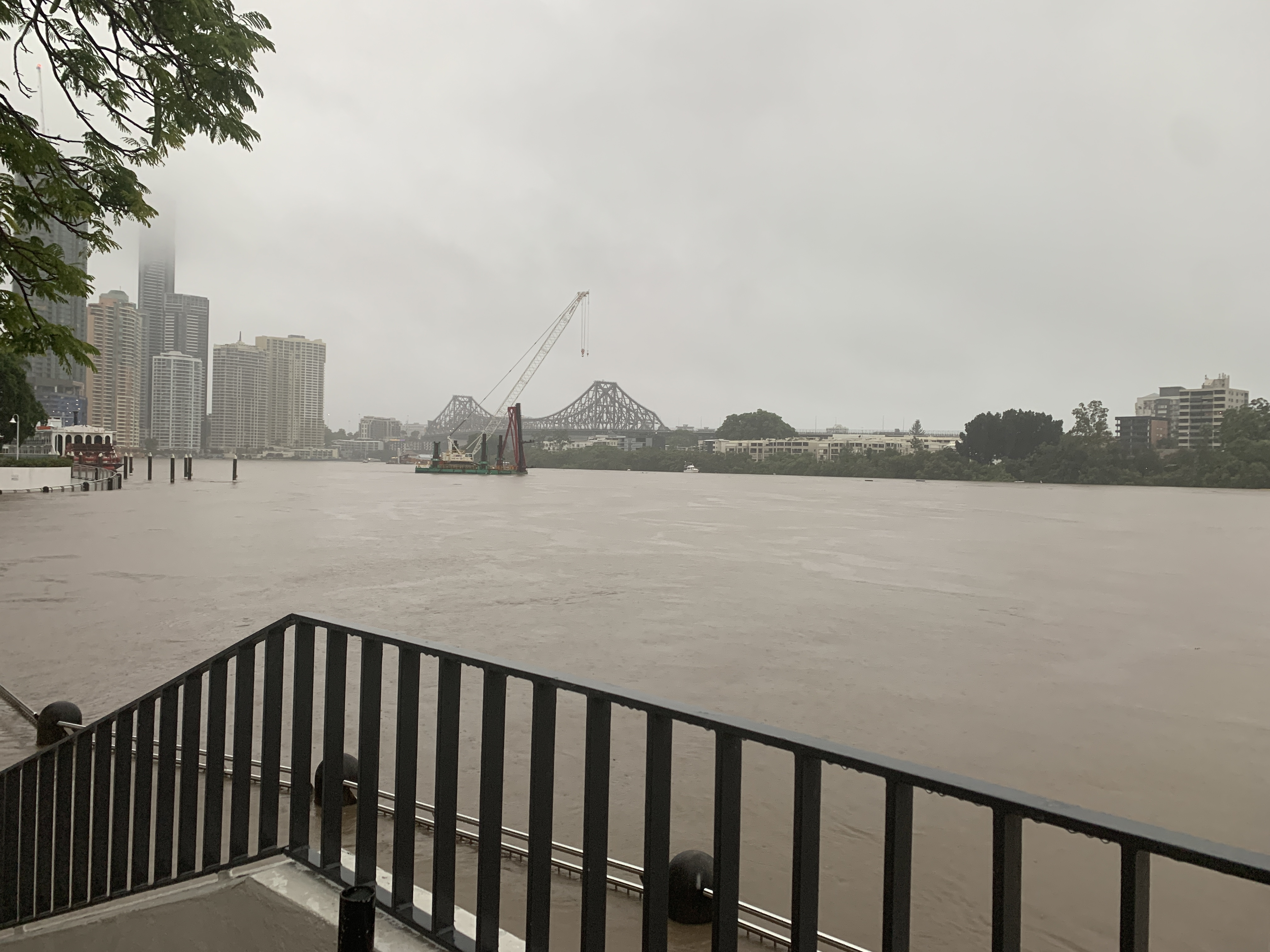
Brisbane River and Story Bridge in flood

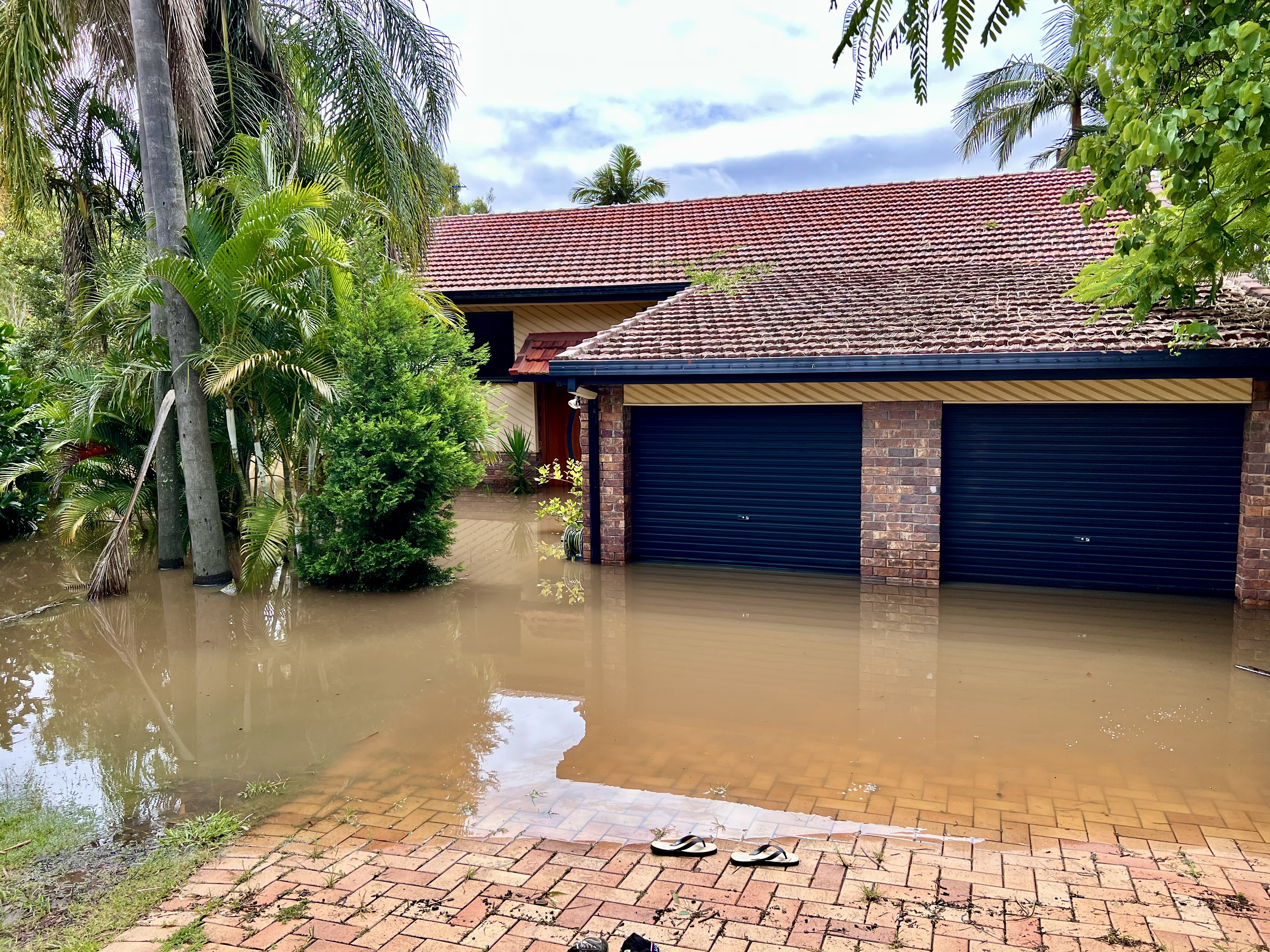
Flooding in Corinda

The Brisbane central business district (CBD) experienced flooding, as well as the inner city areas of South Bank and South Brisbane, Milton, West End, Windsor, Lutwyche, Gordon Park, Grange, Wooloowin, Toombul and Newstead. On 28 February the Brisbane River's height reached 3.8 metres (12 ft), higher than the 2.3-metre (7 ft 7 in) peak height of flooding in 2013 but below the 3.9 metres recorded during the 2010–2011 Queensland floods and less than the peak height of 4.46m in 2011. The Kedron Brook Floodway broke its weir at multiple points inundating houses in the surrounding suburbs and flooding the Toombul Shopping Centre, which shut permanently as a result of the subsequent flood damage. Substantial infrastructure damage was caused to the Kedron Brook Floodway attributable to the 1,000 mm of rain that fell in its catchment over the 72 hour period of the floods. In Brisbane 177 suburbs were impacted with more than 23,400 homes inundated.

Throughout South-East Queensland, more than 20,000 homes were inundated and power outages affected over 51,000 properties. All public transport services were shut down lasting for several days, including rail, buses, and City Cat ferries. South-East Queensland's rail network suffered extensive damage resulting from landslips, and major highways closed due to flooding, including the Bruce Highway, the Warrego Highway and the Ipswich Motorway.

Holman Street ferry wharf in the Brisbane River suffered damage by floating debris. On 28 February, a river crane for the Kangaroo Point Bridge broke free of its mooring, causing the evacuation of apartment and office buildings along Eagle Street and the area of Howard Smith Wharves. Wivenhoe Dam peaked at 183.9% capacity that day, despite the outflow gates being opened, albeit not at 100%. Enoggera Dam, in the western Brisbane suburb of The Gap, reached a record capacity of 270% on the same day.

Wivenhoe Dam is primarily designed for drinking water supply to Brisbane, Ipswich, and surrounding areas, as well as flood protection for Brisbane. The 2022 floods would have been significantly worse if it were not for Wivenhoe Dam, with the dam also being ~56% full prior to the huge inflow. Over the course of the rain event (excluding subsequent inflows after the rain had stopped), Wivenhoe had inflows of 2.2 million mega litres (ML), and released only 150,000 ML, effectively holding back 2.05 million ML from flowing down the Brisbane River and decimating Greater Brisbane.

=== Wide Bay–Burnett and Western Downs ===
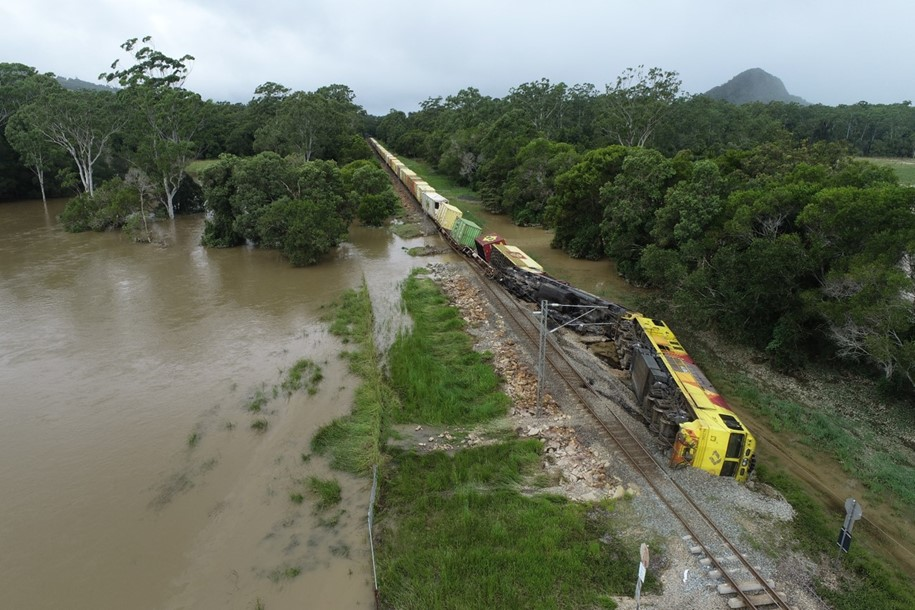
Freight train Y279 derailed at 6am on 23 February due to flash flooding in Traveston.

In the Wide Bay–Burnett, the city of Gympie suffered its worst flooding since 1893, with the Mary river peaking at 22.96 metres on 28 February. About 550 people sought shelter at the Gympie evacuation shelter, and up to 3600 homes were inundated in the city. The city of Maryborough also suffered flooding in parts of its CBD and cut bridges, an 11-metre flood levee was erected to protect the rest of the city centre.

On 23 February 2022, freight train Y279, operated by Aurizon derailed at approximately 3:30am due to flash flooding that had resulted in a track washout at the 149.020 km point just south of Traveston.

On the morning of 28 March, Emergency Services were called to a submerged vehicle in Toowoomba where a man and several dogs had drowned due to the flooding.

On 29 March, heavy rainfall caused flood levels to peak at 3.6 metres (12 ft) in Dalby, swamping homes and businesses, with many residents considering to resettle elsewhere after four floods in five months destroyed their homes.

=== Northern Rivers ===
In early March, in the Northern Rivers, the M1 highway was closed by flooding from Cudgera Creek to Tweed Heads. The area, particularly Woodburn, Lismore and Clarence Valley Council, suffered fuel, food and water shortages. 400 military personnel were sent to Lismore to help with the clean-up. Four people perished in Lismore, after the area suffered its worst flood in recorded history, inundating many businesses and homes in the city, which peaked 2 metres above the town's last record flood. More than 3,000 homes in Lismore were affected by the flood, leaving the region looking like a 'war zone'. There were around 270 people refuging in Lismore's two evacuation centres, with thousands of others finding shelter in family and friends' places of residence. Community groups also stepped in to fill gaps in the state and federal governments' response, helping to clear and clean flood damaged houses while providing food and shelter.

On 30 March, Byron Bay's main street (Jonson Street) was partially submerged in floodwaters following another wave of sousing rain in northern NSW. A residential estate in Ballina was also submerged, flooding homes.

On 30 March, after the all-clear had been given in Lismore less than 24 hours prior, an evacuation order was again issued for those in low-lying areas of the city as the levee overflowed as the Wilsons River began to rise (expected to peak at 12 metres) and the city centre flooded, in addition to a woman going missing in floodwaters south of Lismore. The heavy rainfall and flash flooding evoked more than 60 flood rescues in the 24 hours leading up to the 30th, in addition to some locals being isolated due to surrounding floodwaters. The Pacific Highway was closed in both directions between Wardell and Tintenbar due to the flooding.

In 2023 546 homes made available through the Northern Rivers temporary housing for people who lost their homes in the floods; this still did not meet demand.

=== Sydney ===
On 3 March, thousands of people in Camden, Chipping Norton, Georges Hall, Lansvale, Milperra, Moorebank, Warwick Farm, North Richmond, Windsor, and nearby suburbs were told to evacuate as the Hawkesbury River, Nepean River and Georges rivers began to rise after 100 mm (3.94 in) of rain fell over parts of Western Sydney overnight. Warragamba Dam, Sydney's chief reservoir, was spilling at a rate in excess of 70 gigalitres a day on 3 March.

On 8 March, another heavy deluge inundated streets in Lansvale, Bass Hill, Bankstown, Liverpool and Wisemans Ferry, in addition to two people being found dead in a storm canal at Wentworthville. Areas near the Georges River and Manly Dam were placed under an evacuation order by the State Emergency Service as floodwaters began to rise that day, with 2000 people evacuating in Manly. Floodwaters in this event topped 2021's levels, with playgrounds and caravan parks being submerged, particularly in Freshwater, Brookvale, Manly, Curl Curl and the encompassing suburbs. In the Upper North Shore, the Roseville Bridge was flooded, in addition to a portion of a ceiling at Bondi Junction Westfield collapsing.

On 7 April, the floods forced Picton, New South Wales to be placed under an evacuation warning as the Stonequarry Creek continued to rise. Camden, New South Wales was inundated as the floodwaters rose.

== Response ==
European Commission's European External Action Service activated the Copernicus Emergency Management Service – Mapping in order to produce delineation maps of floods in the Brisbane, Gatton, Grafton, Grantham, Gympie, Lismore, Maryborough and Wivenhoe areas of interest.

On March 7, Scott Morrison stated "these are floods that we have not seen in living memory in anyone's lifetime, and even before that."

New South Wales premier Dominic Perrottet vowed to fund the flood recovery, saying that he was "not going to spare a dollar" in flood recovery efforts. He also stated that there should be direct housing for residents who lost homes, which was a particular concern. According to emergency services minister, Steph Cooke, of the approximately 1,400 rapid property damage assessments taken in Lismore, 900 of them were already considered uninhabitable.

One of the many criticisms by the affected residents was the slow pace of troops arriving to the region. Opposition Leader Anthony Albanese criticised the government's handling of bringing in the Australian Defence Force (ADF), saying, "Clearly, there have been issues here with people who were on the roofs of places for a long period of time. There's a need for an explanation". Although Defence minister Peter Dutton and Dominic Perrottet defended the timing of the ADF's arrival, contending that many parts of the area were inaccessible due to inundating floodwaters. Scott Morrison, in particular, was subject to widespread criticism over his delayed response to the floods.

On 9 March, around 100 infuriated locals in Lismore protested to Prime Minister Scott Morrison, but were denied meeting him face to face. They carried signs and chanted, "the water is rising, no more compromising" and "we need help". It was left to Koori Mail staff and volunteers to coordinate efforts to supply food and essential supplies to the local Aboriginal community and others in Lismore, with financial support only following months later.

=== Relief efforts ===
Damage from floods was expected to reach almost A$1.5 billion, as additional ADF troops came to aid in clean-up efforts. Insurance Council of Australia figures calculated the cost of claims from the disaster was A$1.45 billion as of 7 March, but it was expected to rise once the extent of the damage is known. According to the council, insurers had received more than 96,000 claims, with 80 per cent of those for homes, thus far. Of those, 69% of claims had come from Queensland, with 31% from NSW. There had been as many as 5,000 ADF personnel distributed across the flood disaster areas by 5 March. Despite the aid efforts, there was rising criticism from those impacted by the floods that the government was too slow to act in sending in defence troops to help them. As of 8 March, more than $282 million in disaster payments to flood victims were paid to 242,000 people ($157 million to victims in NSW and $125 million to those in Queensland). The LGAs affected would gain from the next stage of support for the victims, which included $256 million for emergency relief, food relief and financial counselling services.

=== Flood appeal ===
Seven Network, Nine Network and Network 10 united in partnership with Red Cross Australia for the telethon event on the evening of 12 March to raise money for those affected by the floods. The event featured popular Australian musicians who performed to raise money, such as, Tones and I, Jimmy Barnes, Delta Goodrem, Jon Stevens, Vanessa Amorosi, Hunters and Collectors, The Living End, Casey Donovan and Sheppard. The hosts included Seven's Natalie Barr, David Koch, Sonia Kruger and Mark Ferguson; Nine's Scott Cam, Sylvia Jeffreys, Andy Lee and Peter Overton; and 10's Carrie Bickmore, Dr. Chris Brown, Amanda Keller and Osher Günsberg. Proceeds from the telethon were donated to the Australian Red Cross, which provided support to those ravaged by the floods, and this will include evacuation support, staffing of relief centres and outreach services, in addition to helping people and communities recuperate and rebuild.

== See also ==
- Weather of 2022
