= Modanville, New South Wales =

Coordinates: 28°42′55″S 153°18′04″E

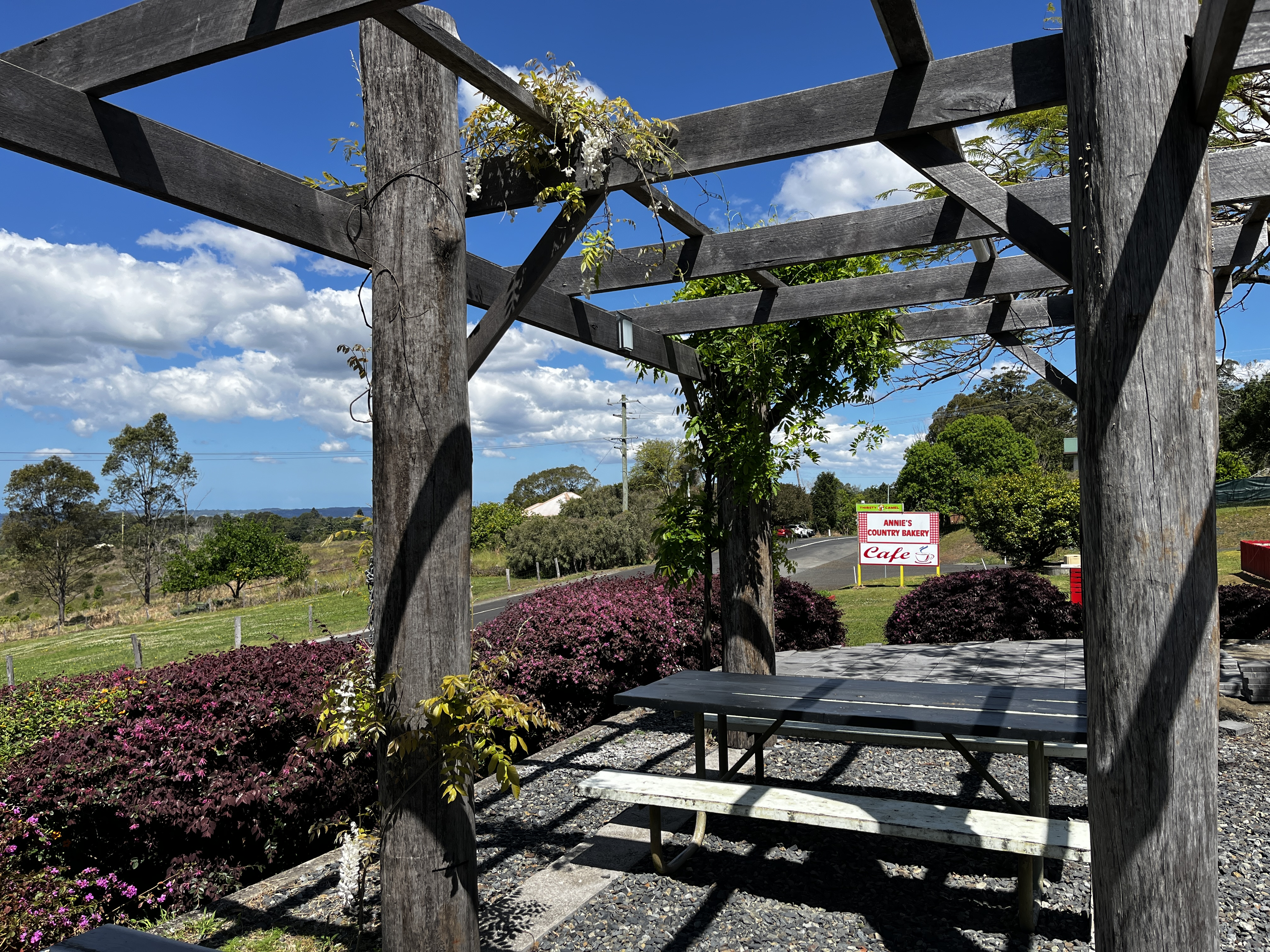
The view from Annie's Country Bakery in Modanville, September 2025

Modanville (MODE-en-ville) is a scattered community in New South Wales, Australia, situated 14 kilometres (9 mi) north of the city of Lismore. At the 2006 census, it had a population of 515 people.

It is on the lands of the Widjabal people of the Bundjalung nation who are its traditional owners.

== Overview ==
Dunoon contains both farmland and areas of rainforest and it is known for dairy and macadamia farming as it sits within the rich soil of the Big Scrub. The most popular activity for visitors to the town is visiting Annie's Country Bakery.

Modanville calls itself the home of the Richmond Birdwing butterfly and has placed signs stating that they are the "home of the Birdwing Butterfly" at both entrances exits to the town.

== History ==
Modanville is a part of the parish of Dunoon and, when it first started being settled by Europeans it was known as Dunoon; this is now the name of another nearby village. This is seen when the first school built there, in 1884, was called Dunoon School. In 1871 Scottish born Duncan Currie was the first 'selector' there and took up much of the land there as a pastoralist. The name Modanville is said to have come from the Payne's, a family who settled in the area in the early 20th century, and it is named after their horse 'Lord Modan'.

From 1908 to 1929 Modanville was home to the Dunoon Aboriginal Reserve where many Bundjalung people from Lismore and the surrounding areas were moved so that they could 'farm and live independently'. The reserve was closed due to pressure from European residents and saw the camp being moved to Tuncester which was 7 kilometres (4 mi) away; during this move it was also renamed 'Cubawee'.

In 1922, writing in objection of the move, Bundjalung man Albert Morthen wrote:

We ask you to show more respect for us, and to leave us alone before there is any trouble. We have stood it long enough. It would suit you better to look after your own cows and pigs instead of looking after us. Are you not satisfied with your own home and shelter? We have wives and children just the same as you have... They told us this would be our home for life, and that no white man would interfere with us. We belong to the soil you are living on. There is no law to say that anything given to the [Aboriginal people] shall be taken back, so we are remaining here for good.

— Albert Morthen, The Northern Star, 19 July 1922
