= Aborigines Welfare Directorate =

The Aborigines Welfare Directorate was a government agency which operated in New South Wales from 1969 to 1975. It had wide-ranging responsibilities over the lives of Aboriginal people.

== Establishment ==
The Aborigines Welfare Directorate was established by The Aborigines Act 1969 which was amended in 1973 and later repealed by the Aboriginal Land Rights Act in 1983. The Aborigines Welfare Directorate replaced the NSW Aborigines Welfare Board. The Directorate later became known as the Aborigines Services Branch, Youth and Community Services.

The Directorate was responsible for policy, providing advice and allocating funds to various NSW government agencies, including NSW Health, Housing Commissions, the departments of Education and Technical and Further Education. The Branch also worked with the Commonwealth agencies of Aboriginal Affairs, Education, Labour and Immigration.

== Closure ==
The Directorate was transferred to the administration of the Commonwealth Government from 1 July 1975. The Aboriginal Services Branch of the Department of Community Services was established on 1 July 1975 to provide services to Aboriginal people other than those transferred to the Commonwealth Government.
