= Burnt Bridge, New South Wales =

Locality in Australia

Burnt Bridge
- Town
- Interactive map of Burnt Bridge
- Coordinates: 31.108°S 152.806°E
- Country: Australia
- State: New South Wales
- Region: Mid North Coast
- LGA: Kempsey Shire
- Location: 5 km (3.1 mi) southwest of Kempsey
- Established: 1892

Government
  - State electorate: Oxley
  - Federal division: Cowper

Population
  - Total: 110 (SAL 2021)

Burnt Bridge is a locality in the Mid North Coast region of New South Wales, Australia and is in Kempsey Shire.

== History ==
John Moseley was an Aboriginal farmer who moved to Burnt Bridge, Euroka Creek, near Kempsey, in 1892. Like the European farmers in the district, he grew maize. In 1900, Aboriginal children were excluded from Euroka Public School. Moseley, his son Percy and others petitioned for an Aboriginal school, which was created at Burnt Bridge in 1905.

Under the Aborigines Protection Act 1909, the Aborigines Protection Board (APB) became responsible for the care and control of Aboriginal people, which included powers to remove children from their families. The APB pursued a policy of taking land from Aboriginal farmers and putting it in the hands of white farmers (by sale or lease). His protests to no avail, Moseley was forced to share-farm on a property he formerly owned. In October 1925, Moseley and Jimmy Linwood addressed a meeting at Kempsey showground organised by the Aborigines Progressive Association.

Around 1930, other members of the Moseley family joined John on the farm at Euroka Creek. In 1937 the APB secured a large block next to the farm for the creation of Burnt Bridge Aboriginal Reserve (sometimes referred to as Burnt Bridge Mission). Aboriginal people from various other communities were moved there and forced to live with inadequate housing or a poor water supply.

Children were removed from the Reserve, including girls who were taken to the Cootamundra Domestic Training Home for Aboriginal Girls, and became part of the Stolen Generations.

The manager of the reserve tried to take over the Moseleys' land, but after several scuffles, stand-offs, a letter to the local press by Moseley, a visit to Sydney by one of his sons, and intervention by Michael Sawtell, the APB agreed to leave them alone. After John's death in July 1938, Percy continued to make a claim on the land; he was then threatened with expulsion. He was granted permissive occupancy of 80 acres (32 ha) of the old reserve in June 1939, but never won title to the land.
