= The Northern Star =

Daily newspaper serving Lismore, New South Wales

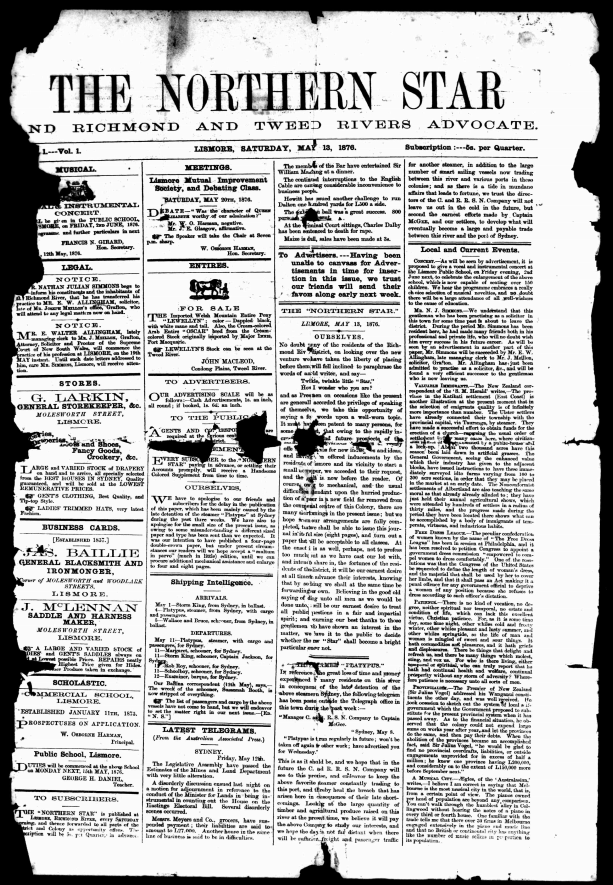
- The front cover of the Northern Star on 13 May 1876
- Type: Newspaper
- Format: Tabloid
- Owner(s): News Corp Australia
- Editor: David Kirkpatrick
- Founded: 1876
- Language: English
- Headquarters: Lismore, New South Wales, Australia; Media Centre, Ballina Road; Goonellabah NSW 2480
- Circulation: 14,737 Monday-Friday; 22,653 Saturday
- Price: A$1.90 Monday-Friday; A$2.50 Saturday
- ISSN: 1036-6768
- Website: northernstar.com.au

The Northern Star is a daily newspaper serving Lismore, New South Wales, Australia. The newspaper is owned by News Corp Australia.

The Northern Star is circulated to Lismore and surrounding communities, from Tweed Heads to the north, to Kyogle and Casino to the west and Evans Head to the south and includes the seaside towns of Byron Bay and Ballina.

The circulation of The Northern Star is 14,737 Monday to Friday and 22,653 on Saturday. The Northern Star website is part of the APN Regional News Network.

== History ==
The two-page first issue of The Northern Star was brought out on 13 May 1876, on a tiny Albion hand press.

In 1955, building started on the media centre in Goonellabah, and in 1957 the move was made from the Molesworth Street office.

In 1981, The Northern Star commissioned a seven-unit Goss Urbanite Web Offset press capable of printing 20,000 56-page copies — 1.12 million pages — per hour.

The newspaper was owned by Northern Star Holdings, which in the 1980s became an associate of Frank Lowy's Westfield Capital Corporation until 1988 when Lowy decided to sell the company's northern New South Wales newspapers to instead focus on its newly purchased Ten Network television assets. The paper was purchased by Australian Provincial Newspapers (APN), now ARN Media.

In 2004, the press was upgraded to twelve units with six Enkel auto reel stands, increasing the capability to 3.2 million pages an hour or 53,333 pages a minute. Colour capacity also increased from 16 to 48 pages of processed colour in one pass.

Along with many other regional Australian newspapers owned by NewsCorp, the newspaper ceased print editions in June 2020 and became online-only publication.

The "tiny Albion hand press" today holds pride of place in the foyer of the Goonellabah Media Centre.

== Digitisation ==
The paper has been digitised as part of the Australian Newspapers Digitisation Program project of the National Library of Australia.

== See also ==
- List of newspapers in Australia
- List of newspapers in New South Wales
