= Wardell, New South Wales =

Wardell
- Town
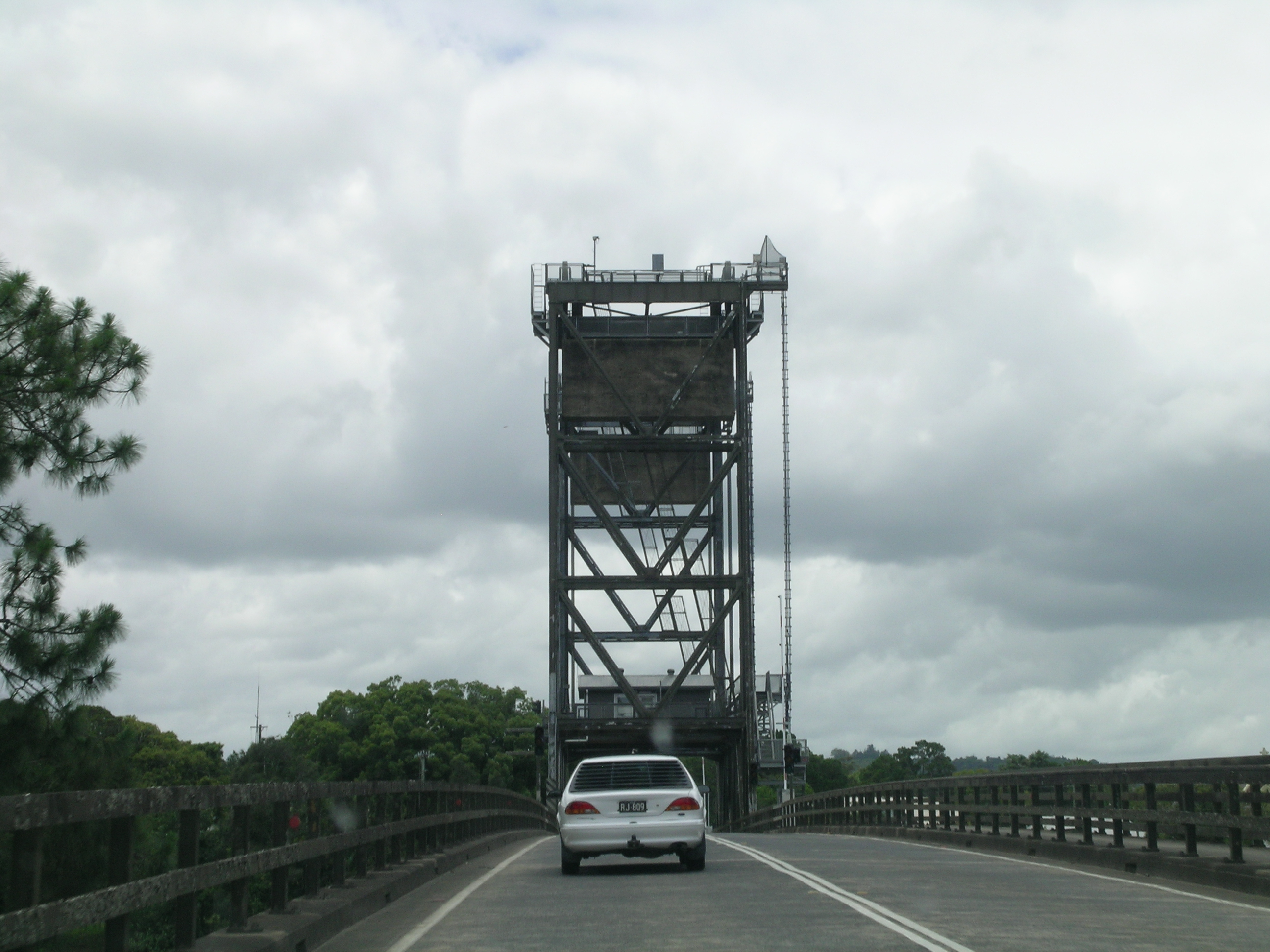
- The lift span bridge over the Richmond River at Wardell.

- Coordinates: 28°57′0″S 153°28′0″E
- Country: Australia
- State: New South Wales
- LGA: Ballina Shire
- Location: 724 km (450 mi) from Sydney; 200 km (120 mi) from Brisbane; 18 km (11 mi) from Ballina
- Established: 1856

Government
  - State electorate: Ballina
  - Federal division: Page
- Elevation: 8 m (26 ft)

Population
  - Total: 662 (2021 census)
- Postcode: 2477
- County: Rous
- Mean max temp: 24.5 °C (76.1 °F)
- Mean min temp: 14.3 °C (57.7 °F)
- Annual rainfall: 1,749.8 mm (68.89 in)

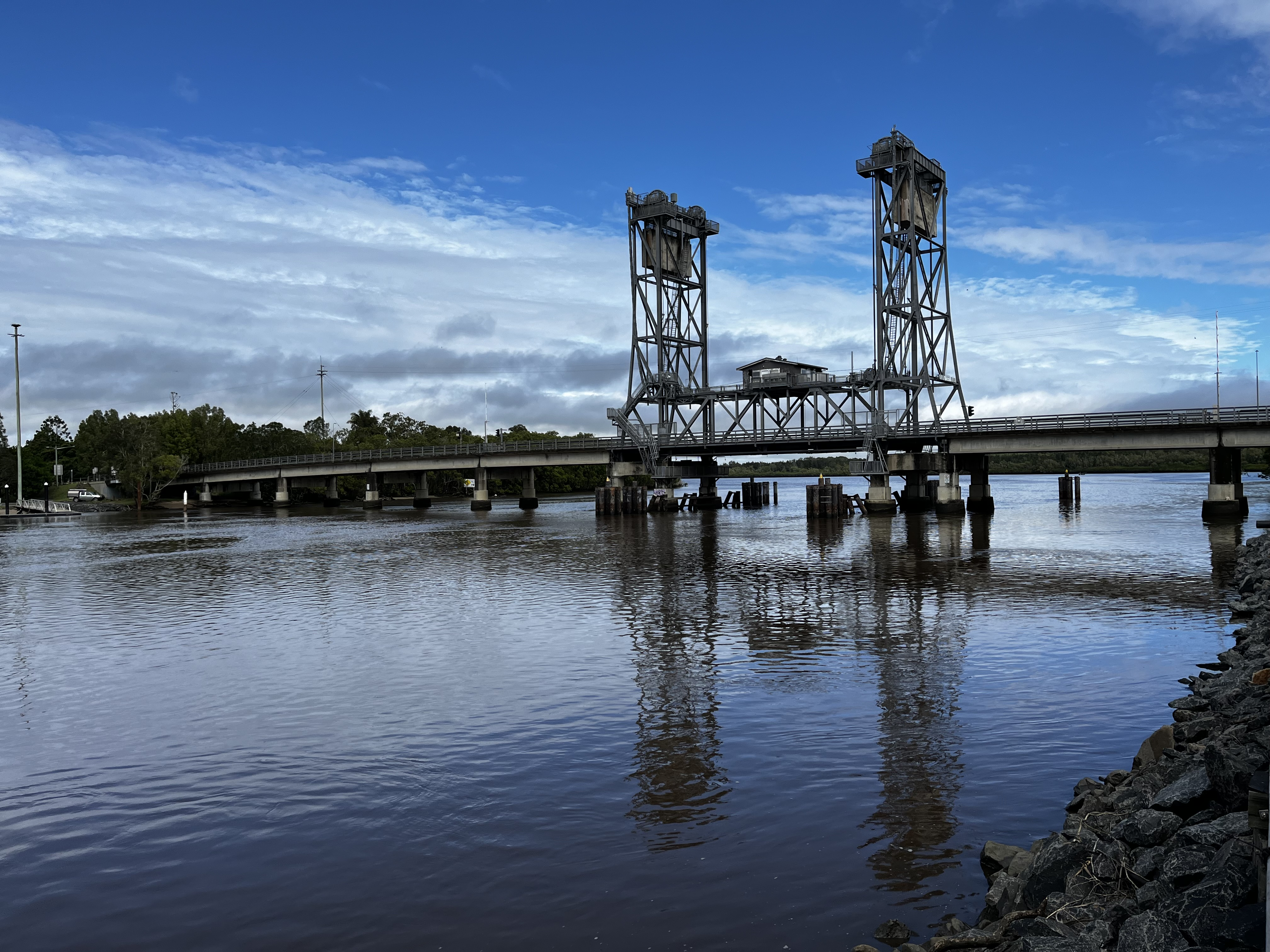
The lift span bridge in Wardell, NSW, which crosses the Richmond River

Wardell is a village in the Northern Rivers region of New South Wales, Australia. It is situated on the Richmond River and the Pacific Highway between Broadwater and Ballina. Wardell is approximately 724 km (450 mi) north of Sydney and 200 km (124 mi) south of Brisbane. The boundaries are within the Ballina Shire local government area.

== Population ==
Historical population
Year	Pop.	±%
1976	245	—
1981	295	+20.4%
1986	315	+6.8%
1991	425	+34.9%
1996	450	+5.9%
2001	485	+7.8%
2006	621	+28.0%
2011	648	+4.3%
2016	663	+2.3%
2021	662	−0.2%
Source: Australian Bureau of Statistics data.

Wardell had a population of 662 in the 2021 Census: 50.7% were males and 49.3% were females. Of the total population in Wardell 10.1% were Indigenous persons. The most common occupations for employed persons were: technicians and trades workers at 20.4%, labourers 17.8%, community and personal service workers 13.7%, managers 10.2% and professionals 9.9%.

== History ==
Bingall Creek was an old name of Wardell and it was also known in the 1850s as the cedar-getter's settlement, Blackwall which was established as a river port on the Richmond River. The river was an important transport route for the region for the first 100 years after settlement. It developed into an important sawmilling centre for the timber industry and later for the milling of sugar cane. Wardell is now split by the Pacific Highway and the River and is known by its landmark lift span bridge which was built to replace the ferries and barges used to transport Australian red cedar (Toona ciliata) and sugar cane in the 1800s. A steamboat service from Ballina to Lismore operated for many years. Today Wardell has a general store, post office, pub, service station and the Wardell Public School which has 50 pupils enrolled.

The river and its estuaries abound with marine wildlife and are used for recreational fishing and water sports.

Wardell was the birthplace of architect Alexander Stewart Jolly (1887–1957), who designed a number of buildings in the north coast area. He also designed a number of homes in the Sydney area, some of which are heritage-listed. Poet and painter Edwin Wilson (1942–2022) spent his first six years in a farm house at East Wardell (as recorded in 'The Mullumbimby Kid').

== Impact ==
The Flooding Event of 2022 has left a lasting impact on the community and the region as a whole:

- Property Damage: Huge numbers of homes and businesses suffered extensive damage due to flooding, leading to significant financial and emotional hardship for residents.
- Infrastructure Loss: This event also highlighted vulnerabilities in local infrastructure to the impacts of climate change.
- Community Resilience: The flooding event brought the community together, showcasing the resilience and support of Wardell's residents as they assisted each other during the crisis.

WardellCore officially known as the Wardell Community Organised Resilience Effort, is charity organisation registered following the 2022 Northern Rivers floods.
