= Permaculture College Australia =

- Type: Accredited Permaculture Training Institute
- Established: 2004
- Location: Nimbin, New South Wales, Australia
- Campus: Djanbung Gardens
- Website: Permaculture College Australia

Permaculture College Australia Inc is a not-for-profit sustainability training organisation which conducts the accredited vocational training and community education programs in permaculture at Djanbung Gardens in Nimbin, New South Wales.

The full-time APT Certificate III, IV and Diploma in Permaculture are AUSTUDY approved for Australians, who may apply for a student living allowance.

Permaculture College Australia leases the training facilities and demonstration farm at Djanbung Gardens as its campus. PCA also conducts permaculture courses at other campuses in Australia and overseas.

== See also ==
- Robyn Francis
