= Nimbin Rocks =

Volcanic extrusions in New South Wales, Australia

Coordinates: 28.616°S 153.202°E

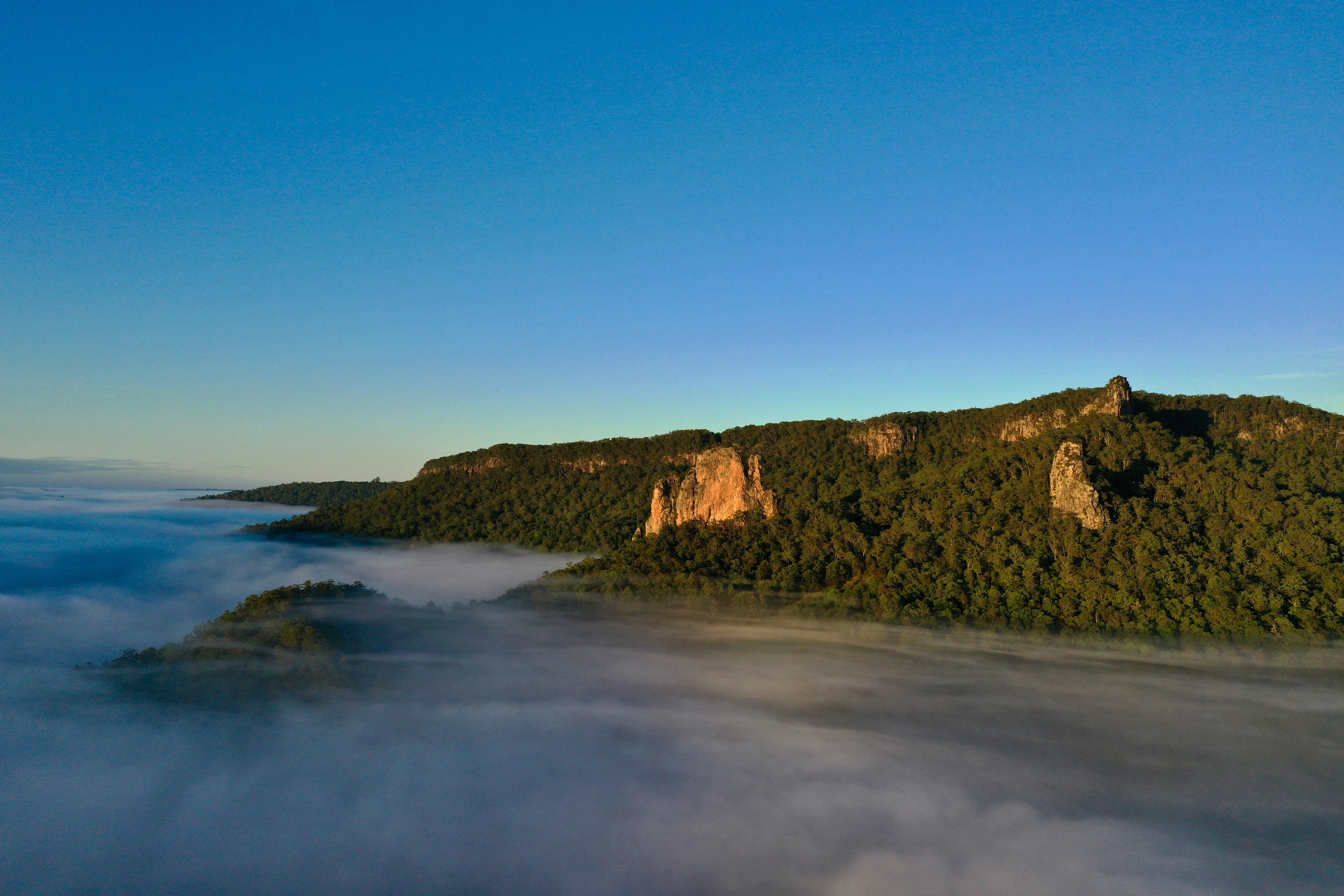
Nimbin Rocks in the Northern Rivers of NSW, Australia

The Nimbin Rocks are volcanic extrusions of rhyolite left over from the Mount Warning Tweed Volcano that erupted around 20 million years ago in what is now northern New South Wales, Australia.

As part of an eroded dyke of the volcano, the Rocks are situated just outside the present day caldera wall about 20 km from Mount Warning and three kilometres from Nimbin village. The three most prominent are known as the Thimble, Cathedral and Needle. They are an extremely significant cultural site to the local Bundjalung tribe of Aboriginal people who believe the rocks were home to the Nmbngee, or Clever Men. They were also initiation grounds for young boys and the dreaming story can be read at the Nimbin Museum.

== Gallery ==
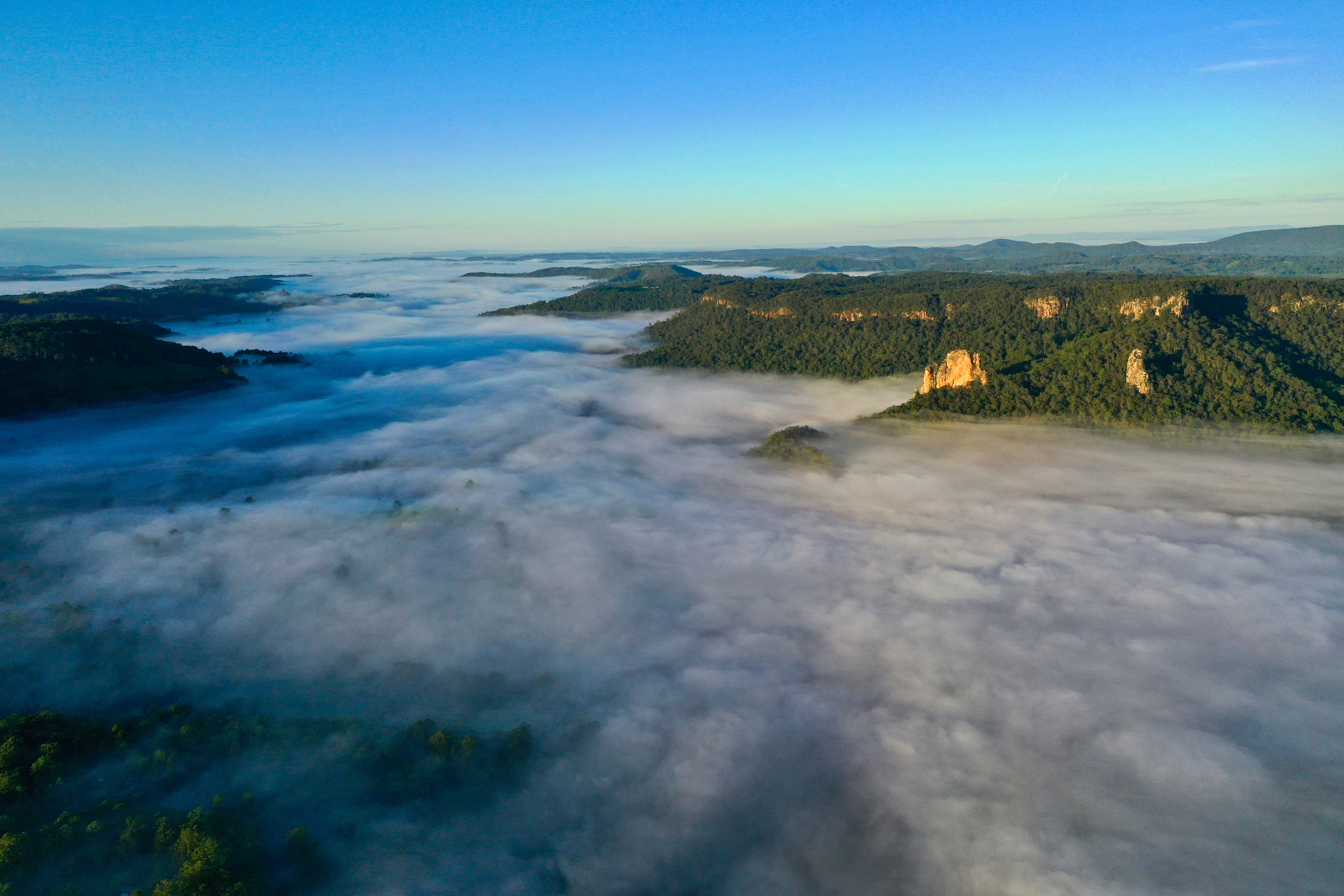
The Nimbin Valley and Nimbin Rocks in the Northern Rivers of NSW

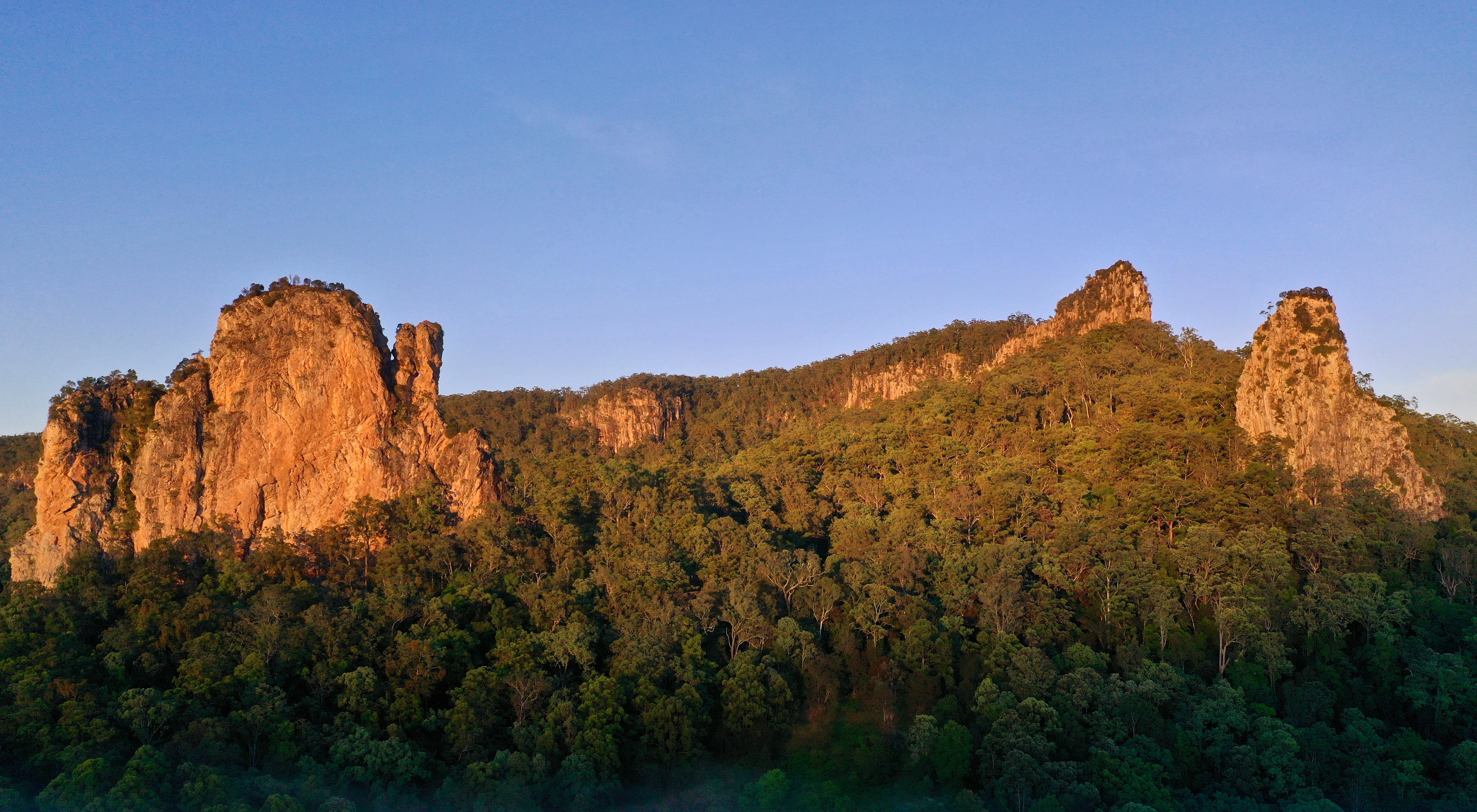
Nimbin Rocks, NSW, Close Up in the Morning Sun

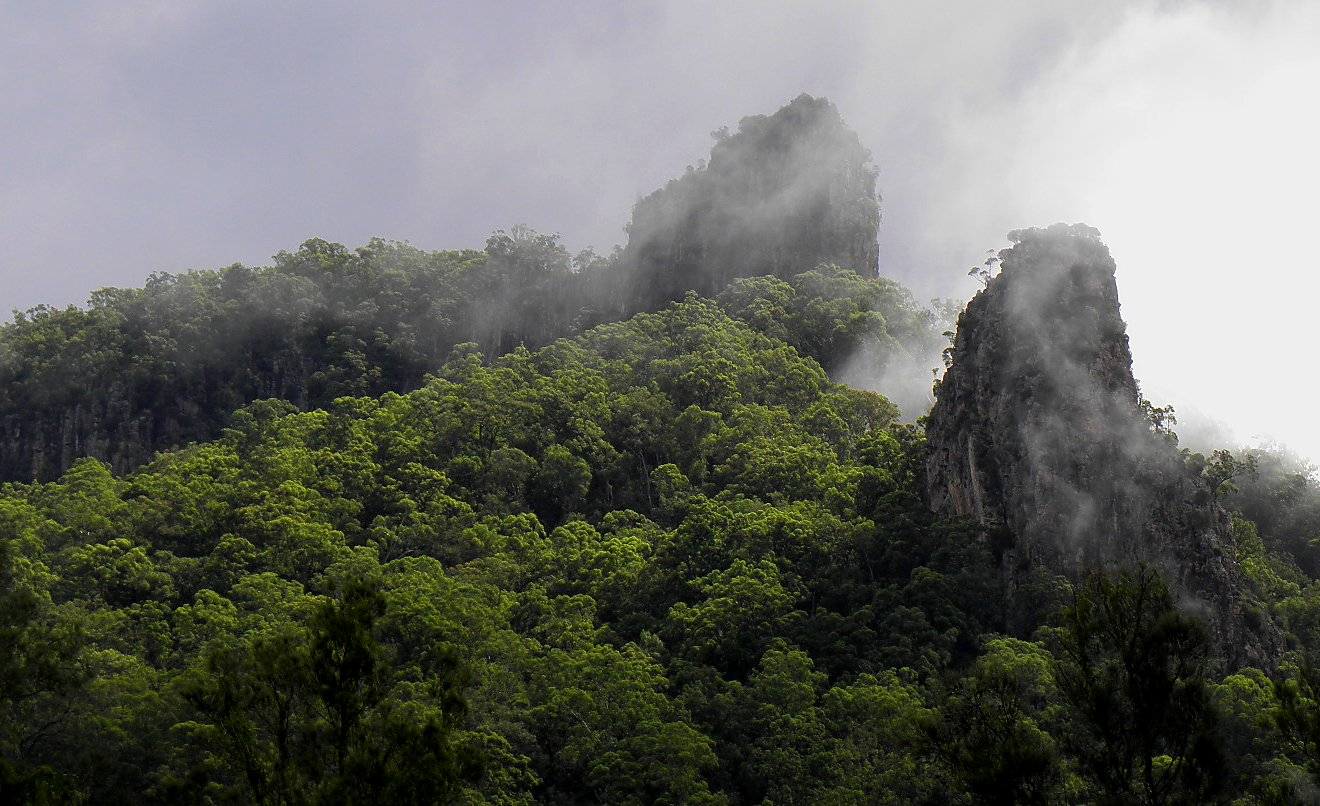
The Needle and The Thimble, Nimbin Rocks in storm lighting

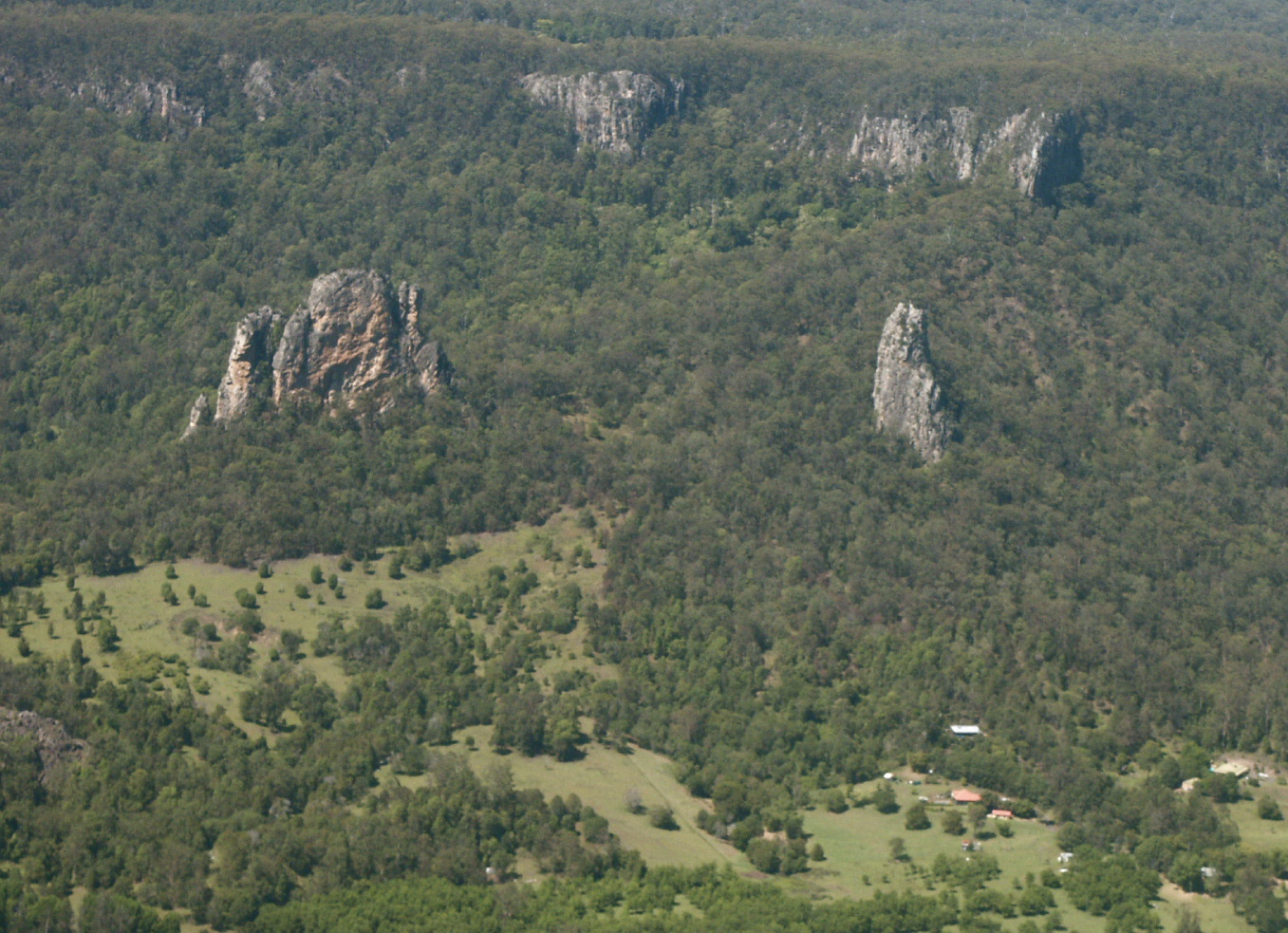
Nimbin Rocks

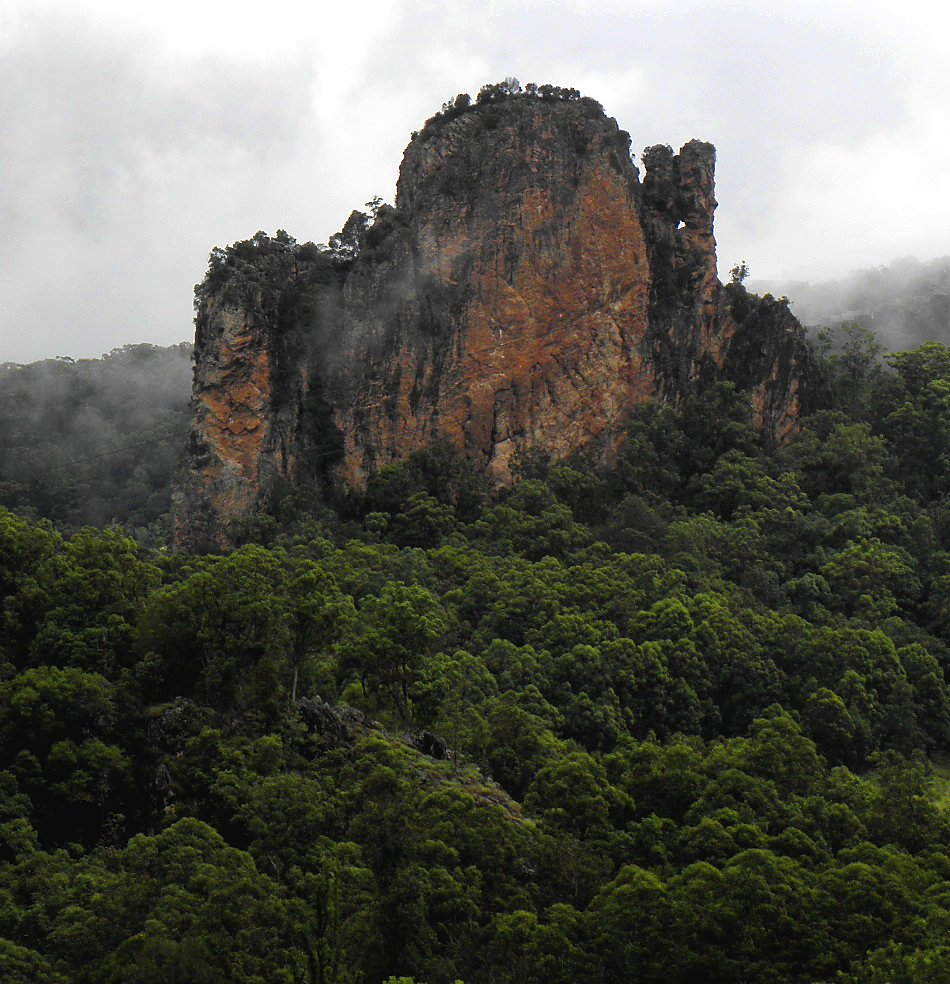
The cathedral, Nimbin Rocks
