= Nimbin, New South Wales =

Town in Australia

Nimbin
- Town
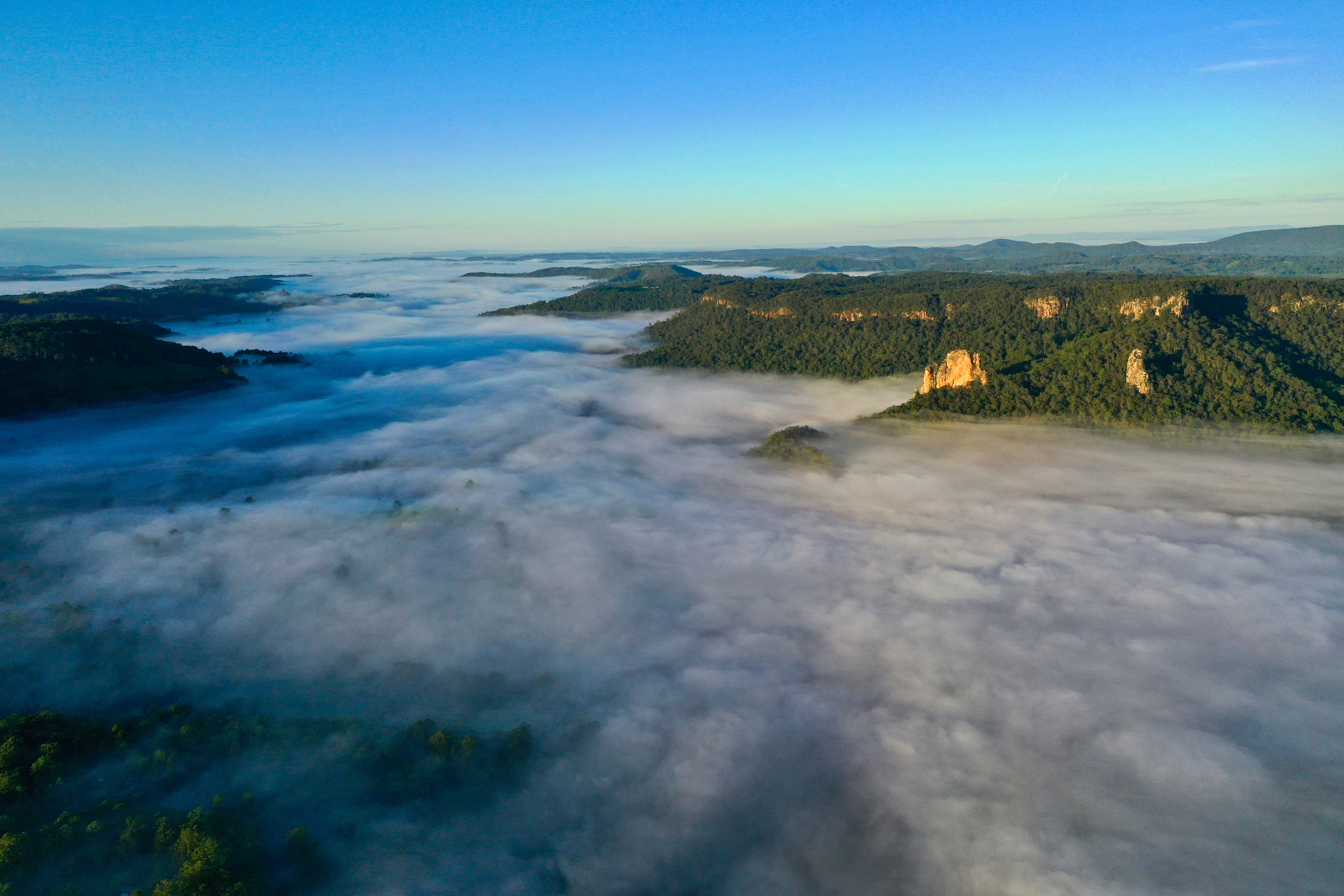
- The Nimbin Valley and Nimbin Rocks in the Northern Rivers of NSW (aerial shot)

- Coordinates: 28°35′45″S 153°13′23″E
- Country: Australia
- State: New South Wales
- LGA: City of Lismore
- Location: 779 km (484 mi) NE of Sydney; 181 km (112 mi) S of Brisbane; 35 km (22 mi) N of Lismore; 50 km (31 mi) SW of Murwillumbah; 33 km (21 mi) E of Kyogle

Government
  - State electorate: Lismore
  - Federal division: Page
- Elevation: 65 m (213 ft)

Population
  - Total: 1,607 (2021)
- Postcode: 2480

Nimbin is a town in the Northern Rivers area of the Australian state of New South Wales, approximately 30 km (19 mi) north of Lismore, 33 km (21 mi) northeast of Kyogle, and 70 km (43 mi) west of Byron Bay.

Nimbin is notable for the prominence of its environmental initiatives such as permaculture, sustainability, and self-sufficiency, as well as the cannabis counterculture. Writer Austin Pick described his initial impressions of the village this way: "It is as if a smoky avenue of Amsterdam has been placed in the middle of the mountains behind frontier-style building facades. ... Nimbin is a strange place indeed."

Nimbin has been described in literature and mainstream media as 'the drug capital of Australia', 'a social experiment', and 'an escapist sub-culture'. Nimbin has become an icon in Australian cultural history, with many of the values first introduced there by the counterculture becoming part of modern Australian culture.

== History ==
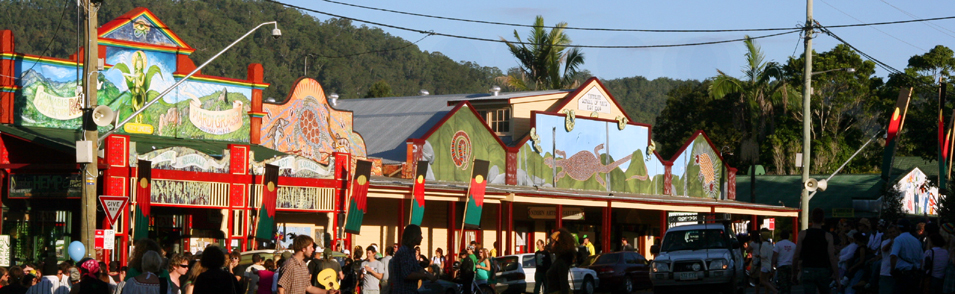
Nimbin Village, 2008

Nimbin and surrounding areas are part of what was known as the "Rainbow Region", which was of cultural importance to the Indigenous Bundjalung people. The name Nimbin comes from the local Whiyabul (Widgibal) clan, whose Dreamtime speaks of the Nimbinjee spirit people protecting the area.

Forests of red cedar first attracted loggers to the area in the 1840s, but by the end of the century, most of the land had been cleared. With the cedar forests gone, Nimbin was subdivided in 1903, with the land turned over to dairy farming and growing bananas.

In the 1960s, the local dairy industry collapsed due to recession and Nimbin went into serious economic decline until 1973, when the Aquarius Festival, a large gathering of university students, practitioners of alternative lifestyles, hippies, and party people, was held in the village. The festival was the first event in Australia that sought permission for the use of land from Aboriginal people and made a significant attempt at reconciliation. Since 1973, the area has been a haven for Australia's counterculture. After the festival, hundreds of participants and festivalgoers remained in Nimbin to form communes and other multiple-occupancy communities, in search of an "alternative lifestyle". Nimbin in fact made legal history for the first ever application of group title ownership of land in Australia. Since the Aquarius Festival, the region has attracted thousands of writers, artists, musicians, actors, environmentalists, and permaculture enthusiasts, as well as tourists and young families escaping city life.

Interviews were conducted in 1992 documenting the alternative lifestyle movement of Northern NSW in the 1970s, focusing on the town of Nimbin and the 1973 Aquarius Festival. Interviewees discussed how they arrived in Nimbin, their efforts at organising the Aquarius Festival, and the lasting impact the festival had on the township.

Architect and University of Sydney School of Architecture lecturer Col James, along with many of his students, was involved in a project designing low-cost housing in Nimbin in the 1970s. James promoted the idea of multiple occupancy (MO) homes, and this guide led to the flourishing of MOs in the Northern Rivers region of New South Wales.

In 1979, the Nimbin community staged the "Battle for Terania Creek" to protect the remaining local rainforest. As a result, the New South Wales government imposed a "no rainforest logging" policy covering the entire state, the world's first government legislation to protect a rainforest.

=== Population decline ===
The population of Nimbin before the failure of the dairy industry in 1961 was 6,020. In the 2006 census, Nimbin had a population of 352, compared to 321 in the 2001 census. The region's high rural population (35 percent of Lismore residents, according to the census) means that Nimbin services a surrounding rural area of about ten thousand people living within 15 km (9.3 mi). Nimbin had the highest unemployment rate in the Lismore Local Government Area in 2006, at 18.1 percent. Nimbin's population in the 2011 census was 468. The 2016 census published Nimbin's population as 319, with local services provided by the City of Lismore (its area containing 45,000 people).

== Cannabis culture and MardiGrass ==
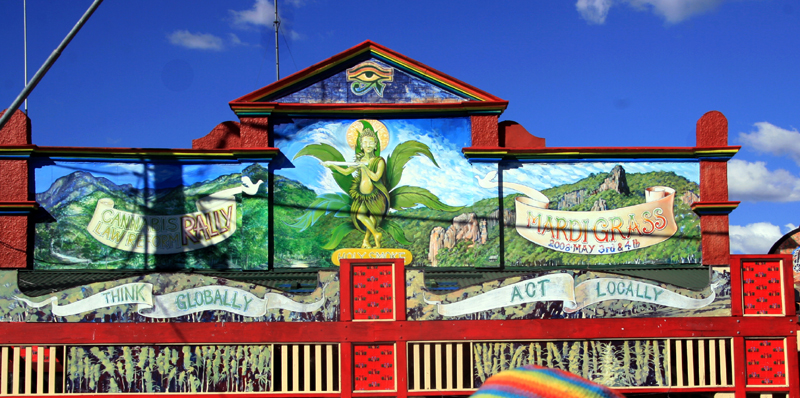
Nimbin Mardigrass, 2008

In New South Wales, the cultivation, possession, or sale of cannabis is punishable by law. In Nimbin, cannabis is openly bought, sold, and consumed.

The existence of a drug culture in Nimbin since 1973 has been accompanied by a prevalence of collective and public creativity: colourful and spiritually motivated art (including large paintings above shop awnings), music, poetry, craft, and fashion can all be seen on the main street. The town is known as a hotspot for alternative social activities, grassroots political discourse, and the espousal of naturalist, humanist, anarchist, feminist, libertarian, permissive, new-age, mystical, and radical social philosophies (which can all be seen as collective creative endeavours).

To rally for an end to the prohibition of cannabis in Australia, Nimbin has held an annual MardiGrass festival since 1993. On the first weekend with any part of it in May, thousands descend on Nimbin for cannabis-oriented fun and frivolity. Activities include: a Prohibition Protest Rally and Parade with the Ganja Faeries, the Nimbin Cannabis Cup, the Hemp Olympix, which includes the "Bong", "Throw'n'Yell", Joint Rolling, and the Grower's Iron Person event, where runners must first carry a 20 kg (44 lb) sack of fertiliser, then a bucket of water, and finally "the crop", as a tribute to the difficulties faced by growers in the hills, and to show that cannabis users can be fit and healthy. At night, entertainment ranges from the Harvest Ball and Picker's Ball, rave doof parties, to poetry and jazz in local cafes.

There are a number of shops in Nimbin geared towards cannabis culture.

- The Nimbin Hemp Embassy is a "soft entry point for drug information" and a shop selling anything to do with hemp, except cannabis itself.
- Clothing and natural skin products using industrial hemp products.
- The Nimbin Hemp Bar used to allow patrons to smoke cannabis while enjoying fresh coffee and cake. In April 2008, the police announced their intention to close the Hemp Bar and Museum; landlords were sent letters to this effect. Rather than cause legal problems for their landlord, the Hemp Bar crew voluntarily closed their doors and moved out. The Hemp Bar reopened in 2009 as a coffee and hemp information centre, but smoking of cannabis is no longer encouraged.
- The Nimbin Museum was a collection of local artefacts, local art, and alternative culture open for viewing. The museum and two other buildings were destroyed in a fire on 13 August 2014.

=== Police intervention ===
The level of police intervention against drug trafficking has fluctuated over the years. In April 2008, a squad of 110 officers, six horses, and several police dogs conducted searches in a police operation. Several buildings were searched including the Hemp Embassy. Eight people were arrested, 72 people were issued cannabis cautions, and police seized 4 kilograms (9 lb) of cannabis and cannabis cookies. The police sent letters to the Nimbin Museum and the Hemp Bar leaseholders indicating an intention to seek closure orders under the Restricted Premises Act of 1943 for the MardiGrass weekend. The Restricted Premises Act allows for the closure of premises for three days and orders may be obtained weekly. The museum reopened with a new leaseholder while the Hemp Bar remained closed for eight months and reopened in January 2009.

CCTV cameras in the main street of Nimbin had pushed dealing off the streets and into the museum, and the Hemp Embassy had been requesting that police deal with the problem. Following the raids, Hemp Embassy volunteer Andrew Kavasilas commented: "This is a real slap in the face for people who would like to see other resources in town. We have been inviting the police to come down and sort out the dealing in the museum for years and this is their response. They could work with the community, but they're not interested." Many locals voiced their opposition to the police operation. Following the operation, Richmond Police local area commander Superintendent Bruce Lyons vowed to "shut down the drug trade."

== Accommodation and attractions ==
A wide variety of accommodations are available for visitors, from campgrounds and backpacker hostels, to bush cabins and hotels.

Nimbin has a police station, hospital and medical centre, lawyers, real estate agency, service station with NRMA accreditation, restaurants, cafes, and a pub. The pub has an in-house restaurant. There are a number of sporting clubs and the bowling club maintains licensed premises. The Nimbin Neighbourhood and Information Centre (NNIC), run by local volunteer residents, offers visitors guides, computers for internet use, a small Centrelink office, legal advice, a nurse practitioner, a welfare worker, weekly soup kitchen in the adjacent park, and a publishing service for the local newspaper. Local attractions include the town hall, annual MardiGrass, markets, bands, walks to the mountains, and day-to-day activities from buskers to street stalls.

Other nearby attractions:

- Nimbin Rocks, a series of jagged outcrops, solidified plugs left after the erosion of volcanic dykes and vents, and Blue Knob, which are both landmarks for the village.
- Mount Warning (known to the Bundjalung people as Wollumbin, meaning 'cloud catcher') is about 50 kilometres (31 mi) away. Named by James Cook as a maritime navigational indicator of dangerous offshore reefs, Mt. Warning's summit is the first part of mainland Australia to receive light from each sunrise. Mount Warning is the remaining centre plug of a caldera which, 23 million years ago, had a 100-kilometre (62 mi) diameter. Its height was 1,156 metres (3,793 ft), nearly twice the height of Mount Warning today. The summit of Mt. Warning can be climbed via a 9 kilometres (5.6 mi), five-hour return walk through forested slopes.
- Nightcap National Park is one of the few remaining places to see the remnants of the Big Scrub rainforest.
- There are local creeks, water holes, and rivers for swimming.

== Media ==
The Nimbin Good Times is a free monthly community newspaper, also distributed in Lismore, Byron Bay, and some suburbs of Brisbane and Sydney.

Nimbin Zone Magazine is Nimbin's bi-monthly magazine, featuring creative and artistic people from the village and beyond. The community radio station 2NIMFM offers an independent alternative media voice and plays a diverse range of music and programming in Japanese, German, and the Bundjalung language.

NimFM (2NIM) is a local, volunteer-run radio station that plays music, talk shows, local news, and specialized programs. Other radio stations that broadcast to the town are ABC North Coast, 101.9 Paradise FM, River FM, and Triple Z FM.

== Politics ==
Nimbin consistently delivers strong election results for progressive political parties. At the 2019 Australian federal election, the Greens topped the primary vote with 48%, followed by Labor at 29%, the Animal Justice Party with 9%, and the National Party, which won the wider seat of Page, with 6%. In the 2023 New South Wales election, Labor's Janelle Saffin topped the vote in Nimbin, followed by the Greens candidate, with both polling more than six times the primary vote of the main conservative candidate from the Nationals.

== Churches ==
- St Mark's Anglican Church – A stone in a gate pillar records: Dedicated – to the Glory of God – and in loving memory of – the gates to St Mark's are dedicated to the memory of Ernest Andrew McClelland, who died aged 68 years in 1954. They were donated by the McClelland family of Nimbin.
- St Patrick's Catholic Church – This former church has been decommissioned and is now private property.
- St Stephen's Presbyterian Church – The current Presbyterian church was built in 1922. For 50 years, home missionaries served the parish until the congregation welcomed its first ordained minister in 1959.
- Uniting Church – The former Nimbin Methodist Church became a Uniting Church in Australia parish with the Basis of Union, when most congregations of the Congregational Union of Australia, Methodist Church, and Presbyterian Church united in the 1970s. The building was designed and built by carpenter Eustace William Henry (Harry) Stanger (1875–1953). Stanger was born in Bathurst, New South Wales, and was educated at Newington College. In 1910, he moved to Nimbin and lived there until his death. With J. W. Bagust, he established moving pictures in the town and showed them for over forty years. As a carpenter, he was associated with the construction of many timber buildings in Nimbin. He was a founding member of the Nimbin Methodist Church Trust, and served as a circuit steward. He was a member of the Loyal Orange Lodge, the first greenkeeper for the Nimbin Bowling Club, and president of the Nimbin Progress Association.

== Transport ==
The nearest airport is Ballina Byron Gateway Airport, located 68 km (42 mi) southwest of Nimbin.

Northern River Buslines operates multiple services per weekday on route 650 to Lismore.

Gosel's Bus Service operates two services per weekday on route 630 to Murwillumbah, with connection to Tweed Heads.

There is also a school bus service available for the general public on school days to Kyogle.

== Gallery ==
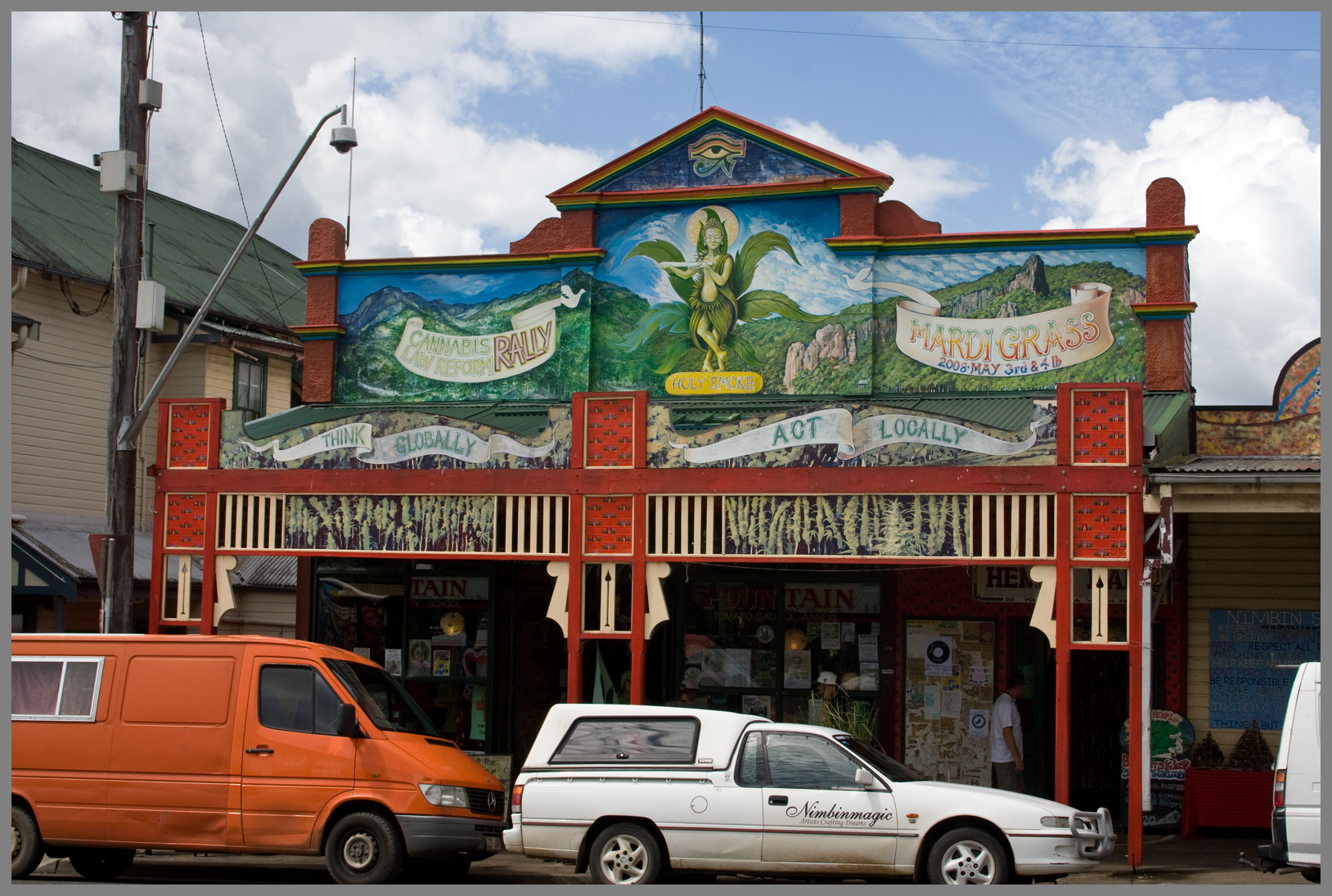
One of Nimbin's many painted shopfronts, March 2008

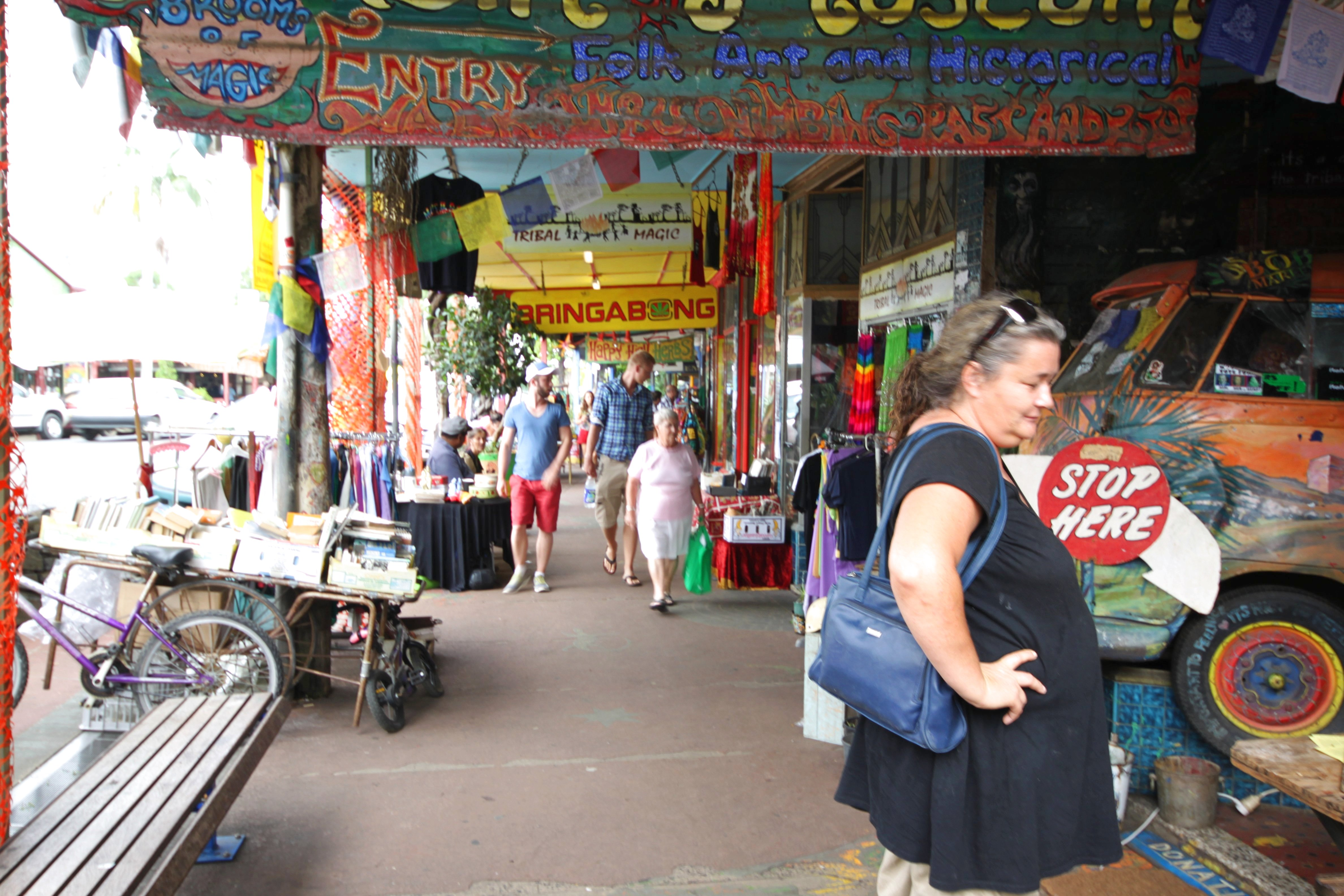
Nimbin main street, February 2014, showing appearance before the 2014 fire that destroyed several buildings.

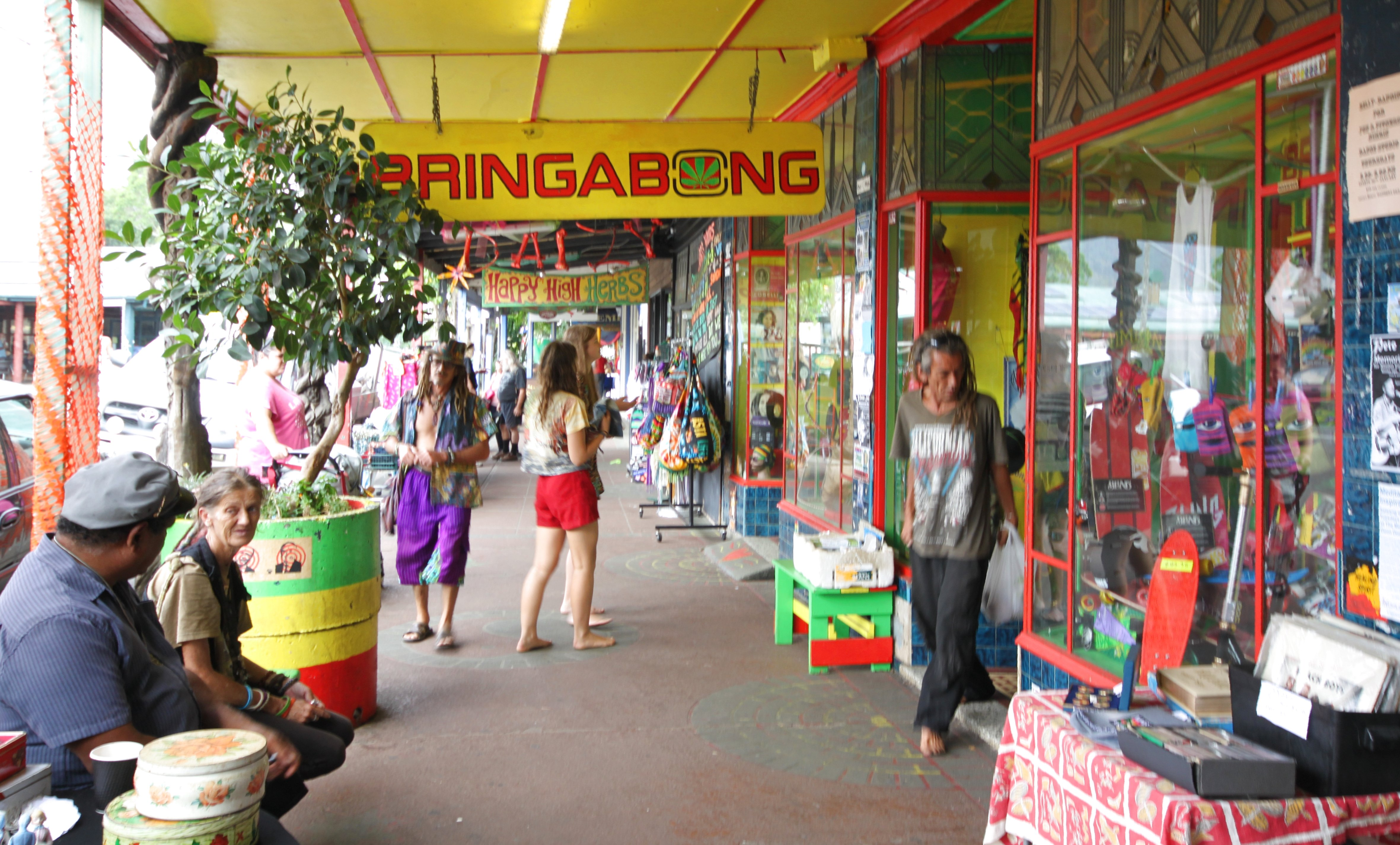
Nimbin main street, February 2014, showing appearance before the 2014 fire that destroyed several buildings.

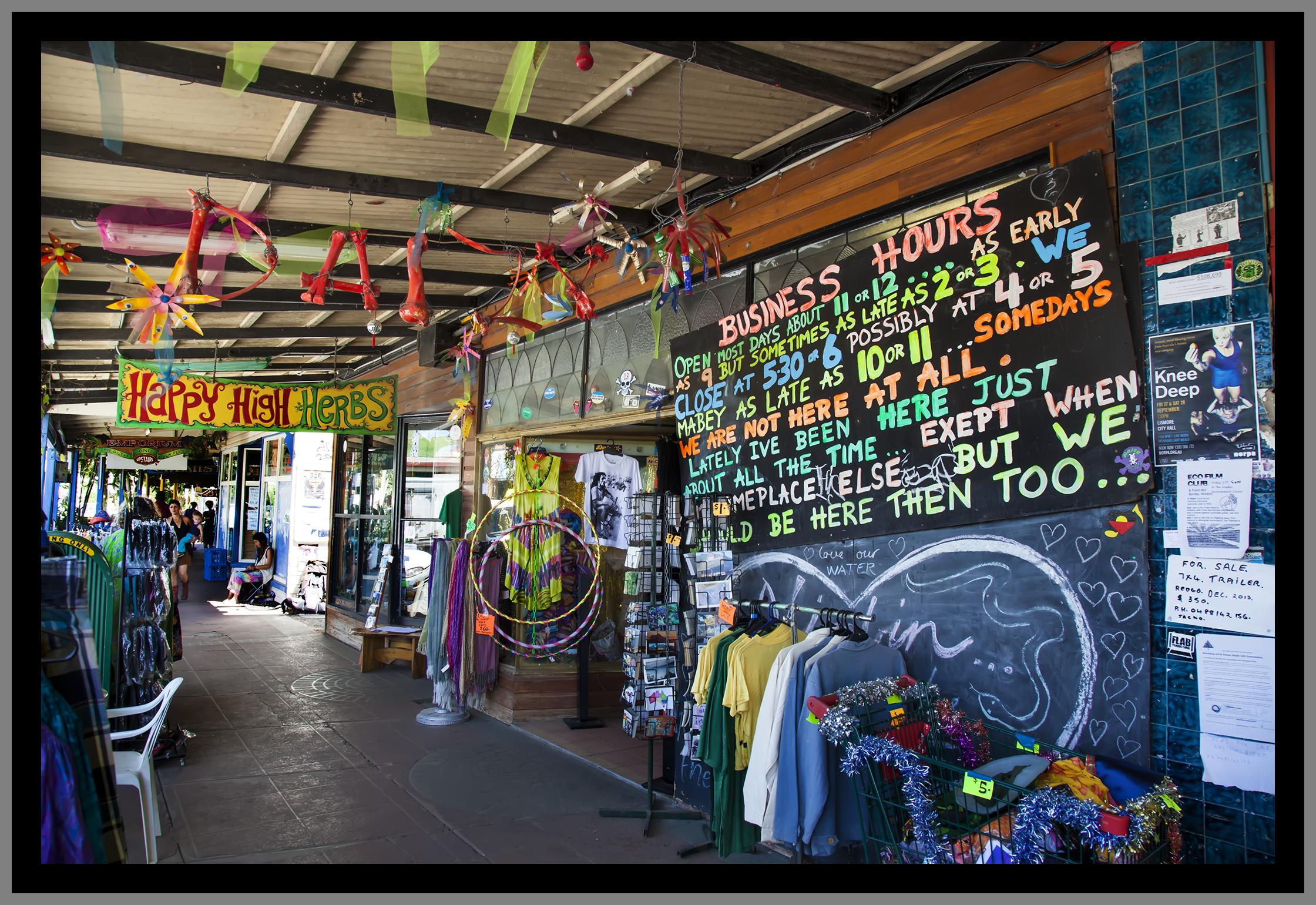
Shops in Nimbin, February 2013

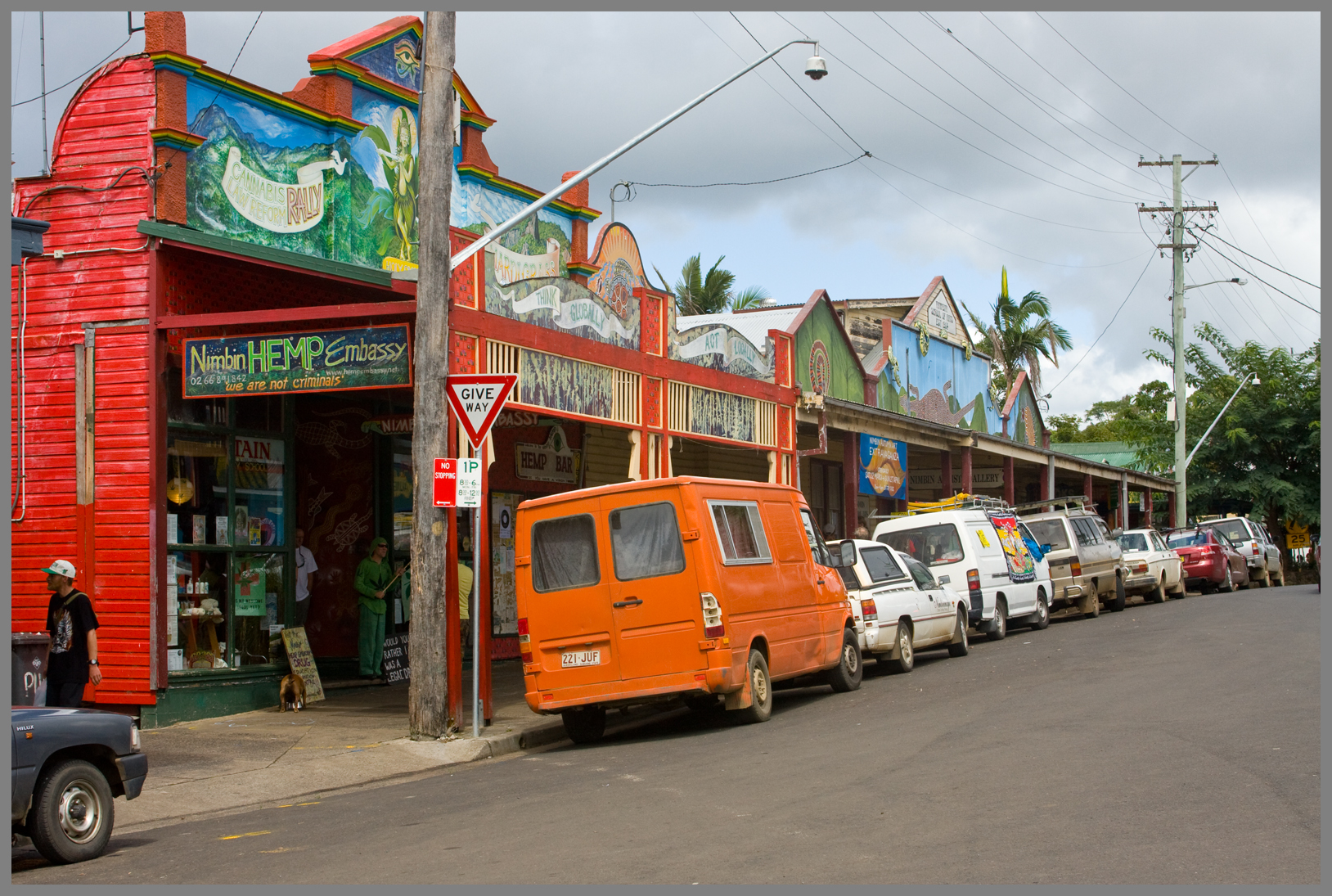
Street scene in Nimbin, March 2008

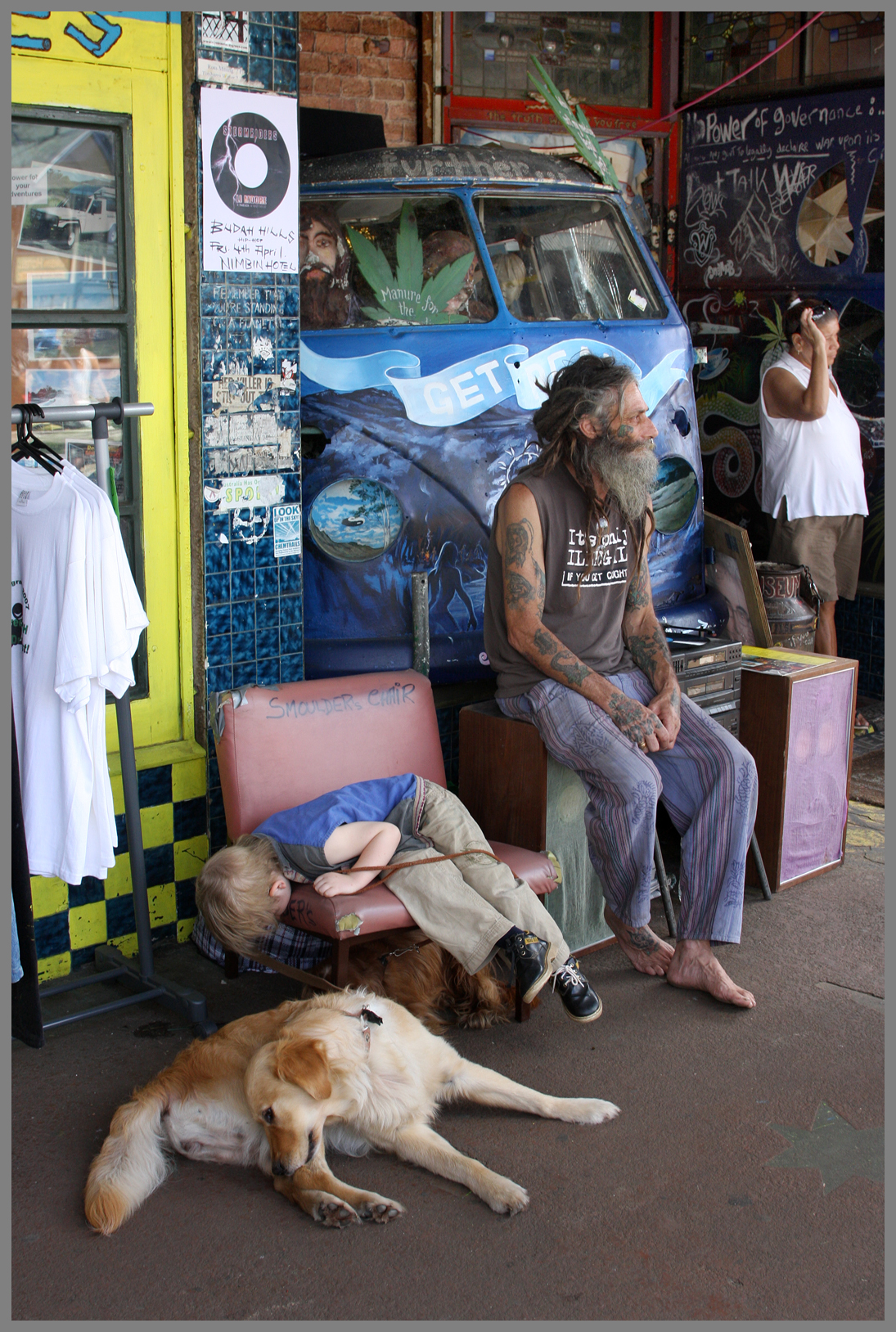
Outside the former Nimbin Museum, March 2008

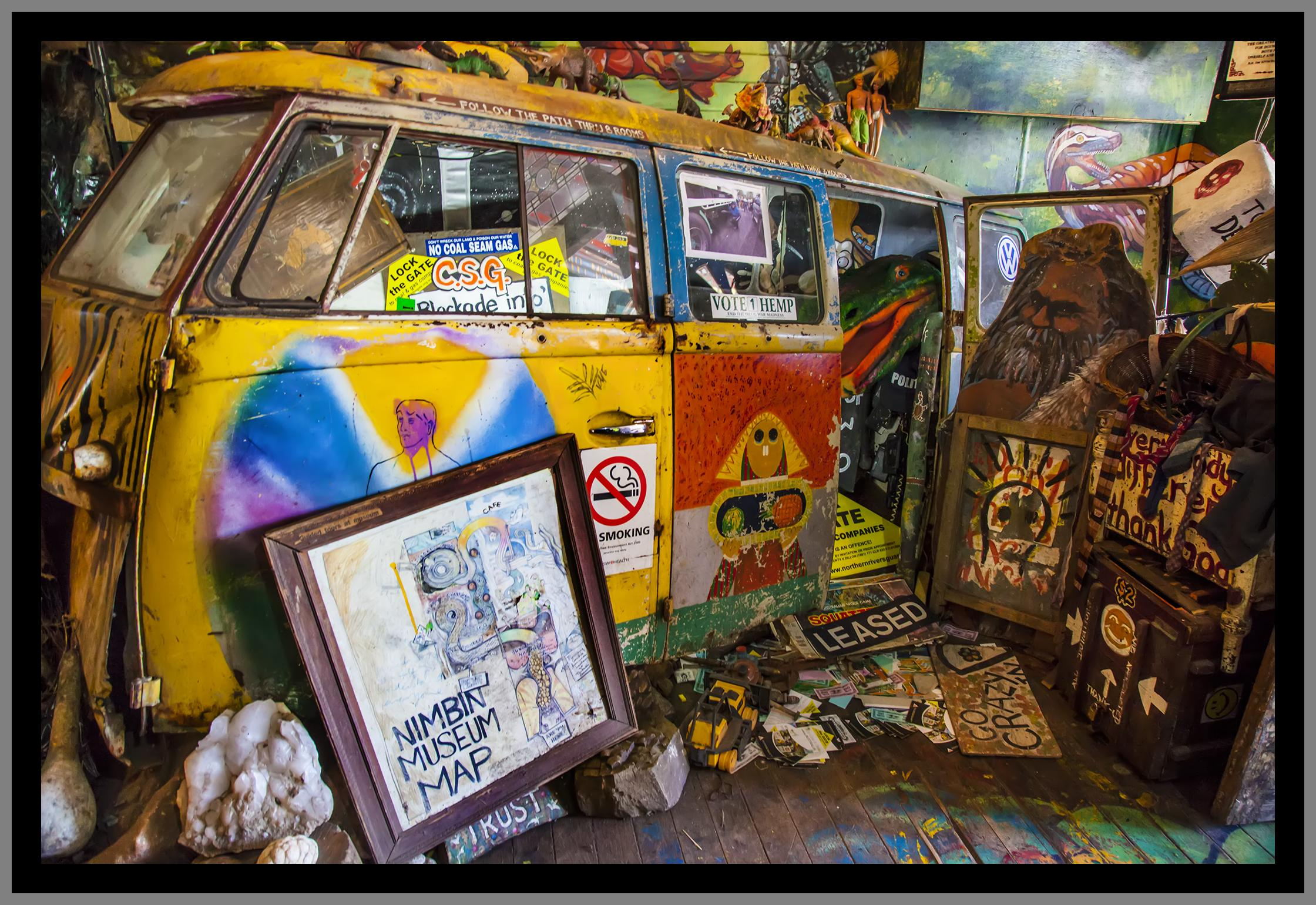
Inside the former Nimbin Museum, September 2023

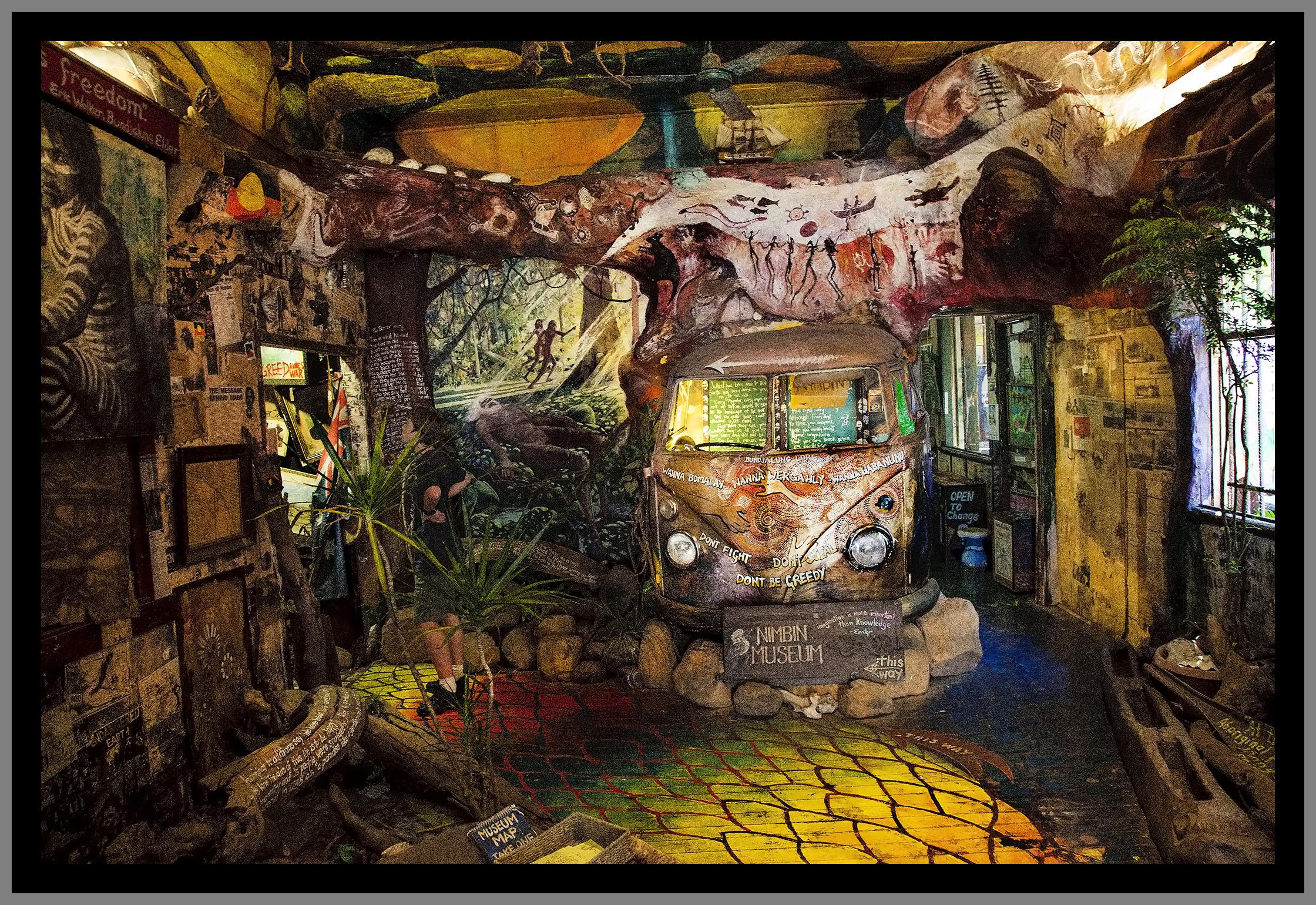
Inside the former Nimbin Museum, September 2013

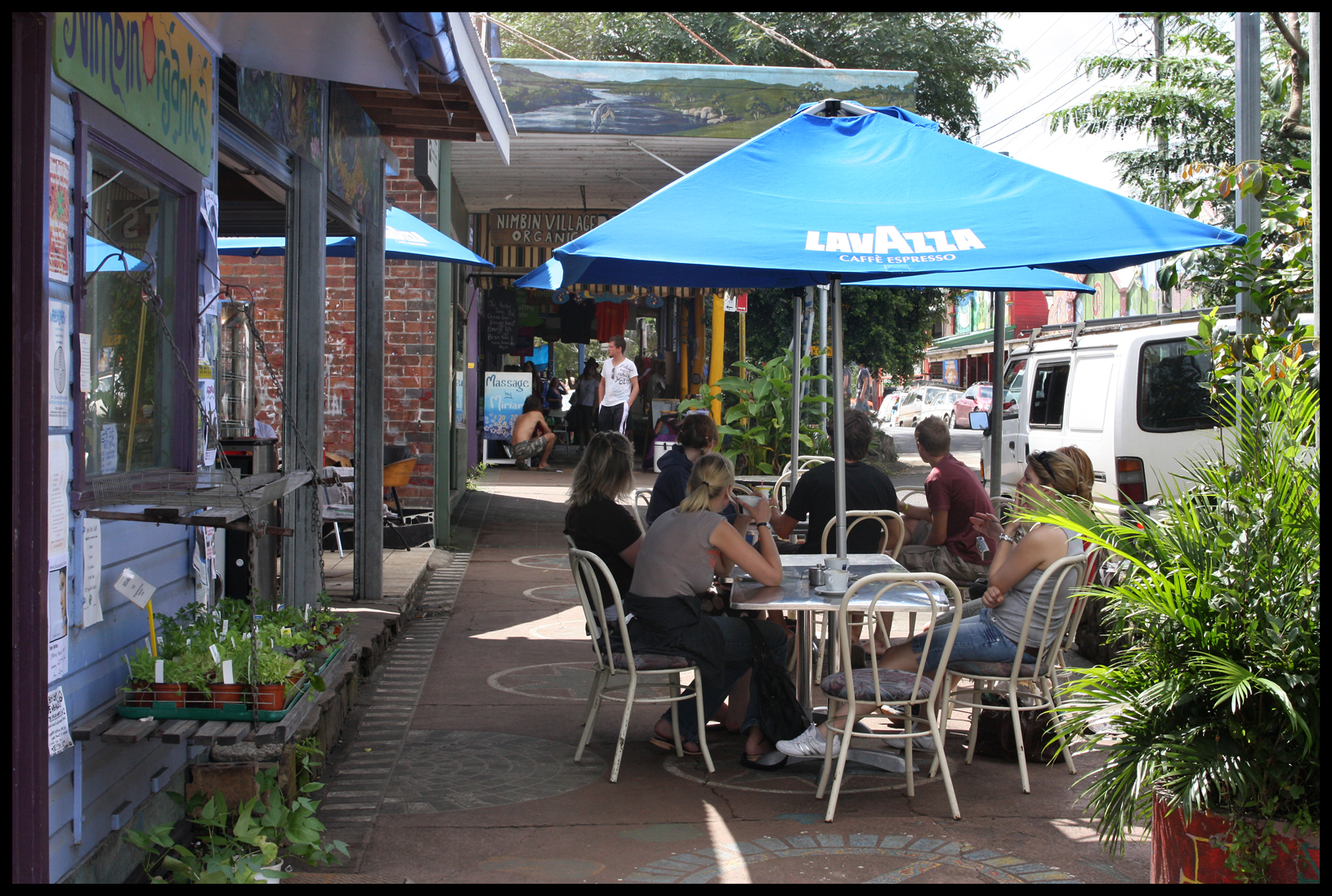
Cafe scene in Nimbin, March 2008

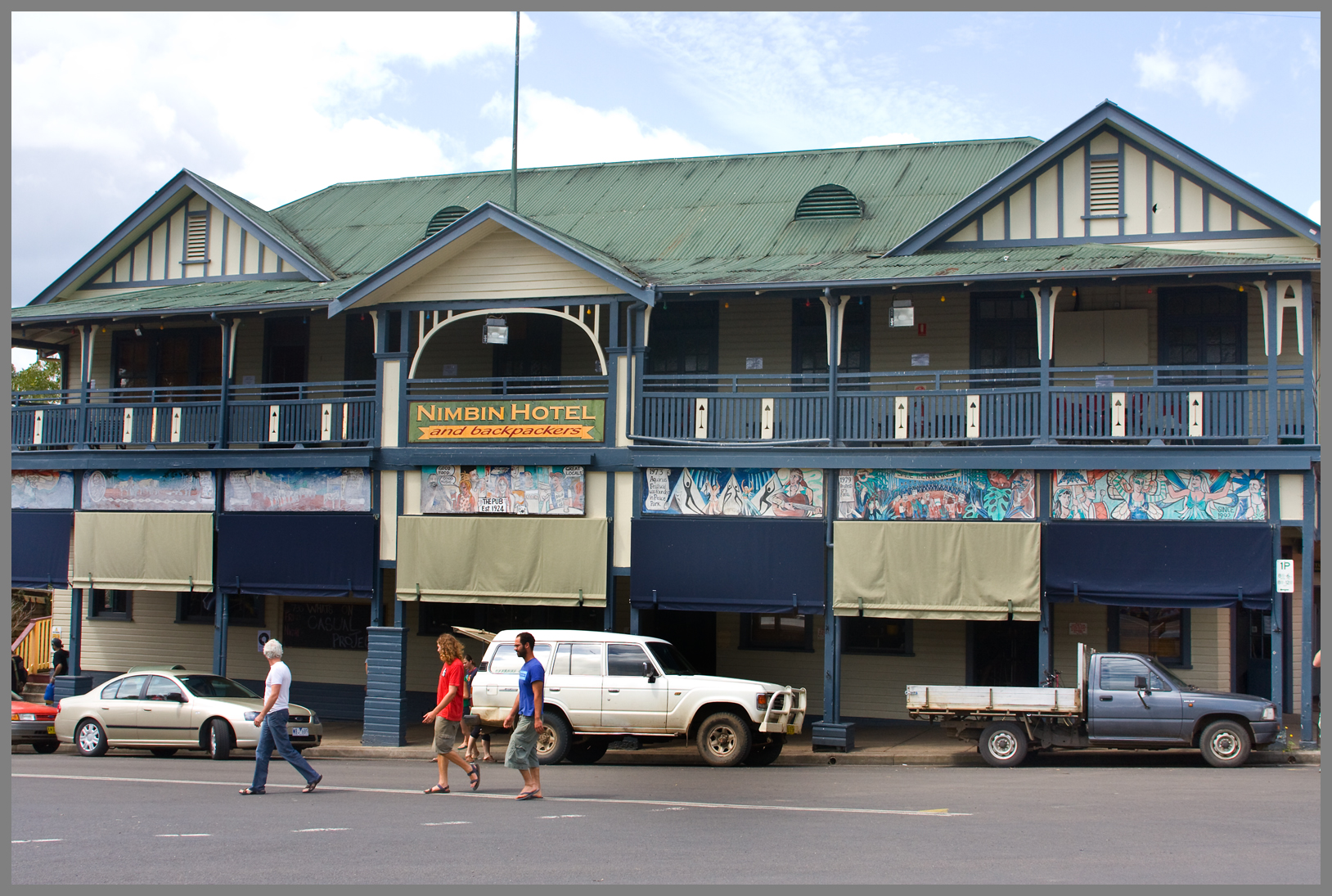
The Nimbin Hotel, March 2008

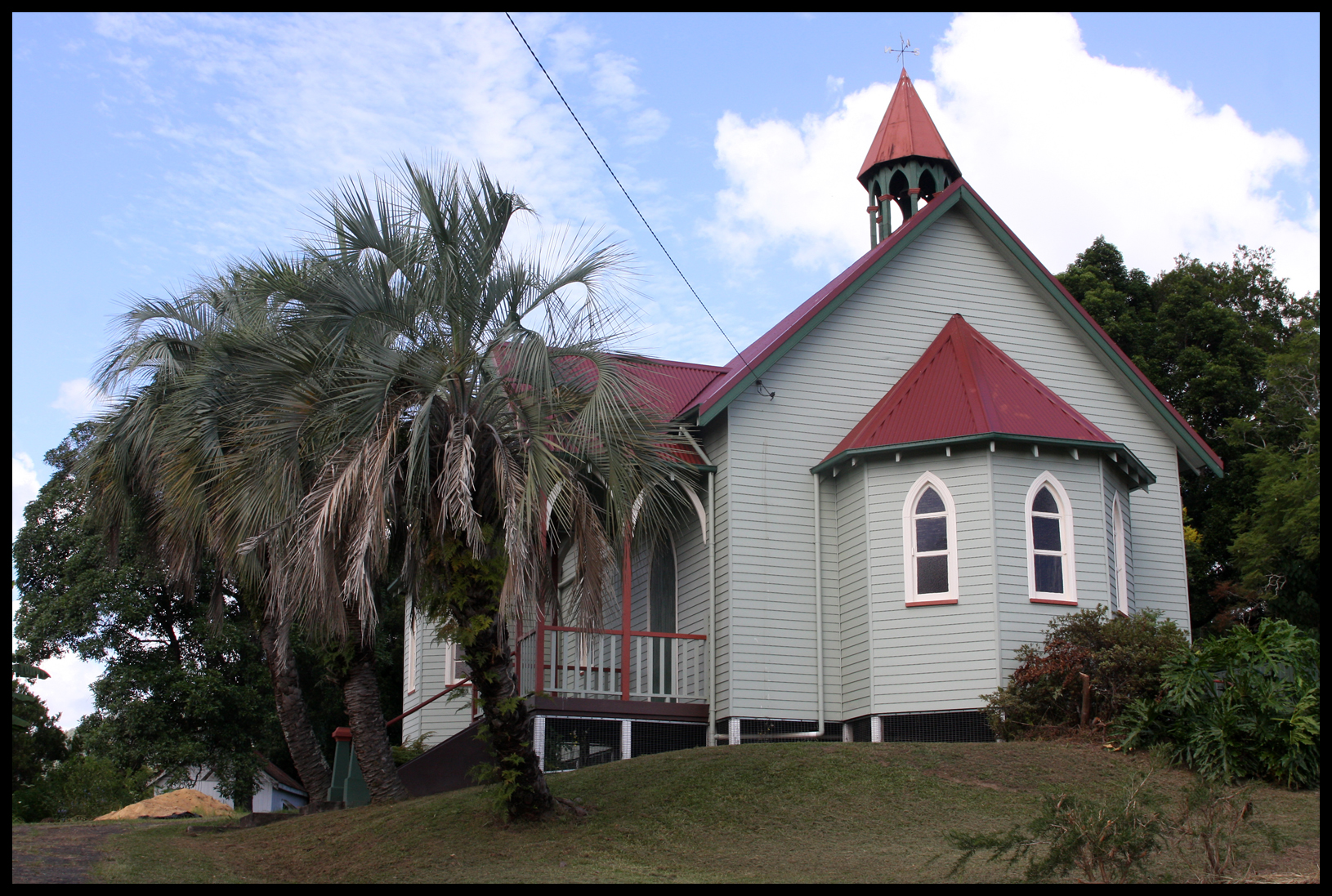
One of Nimbin's several churches, March 2008

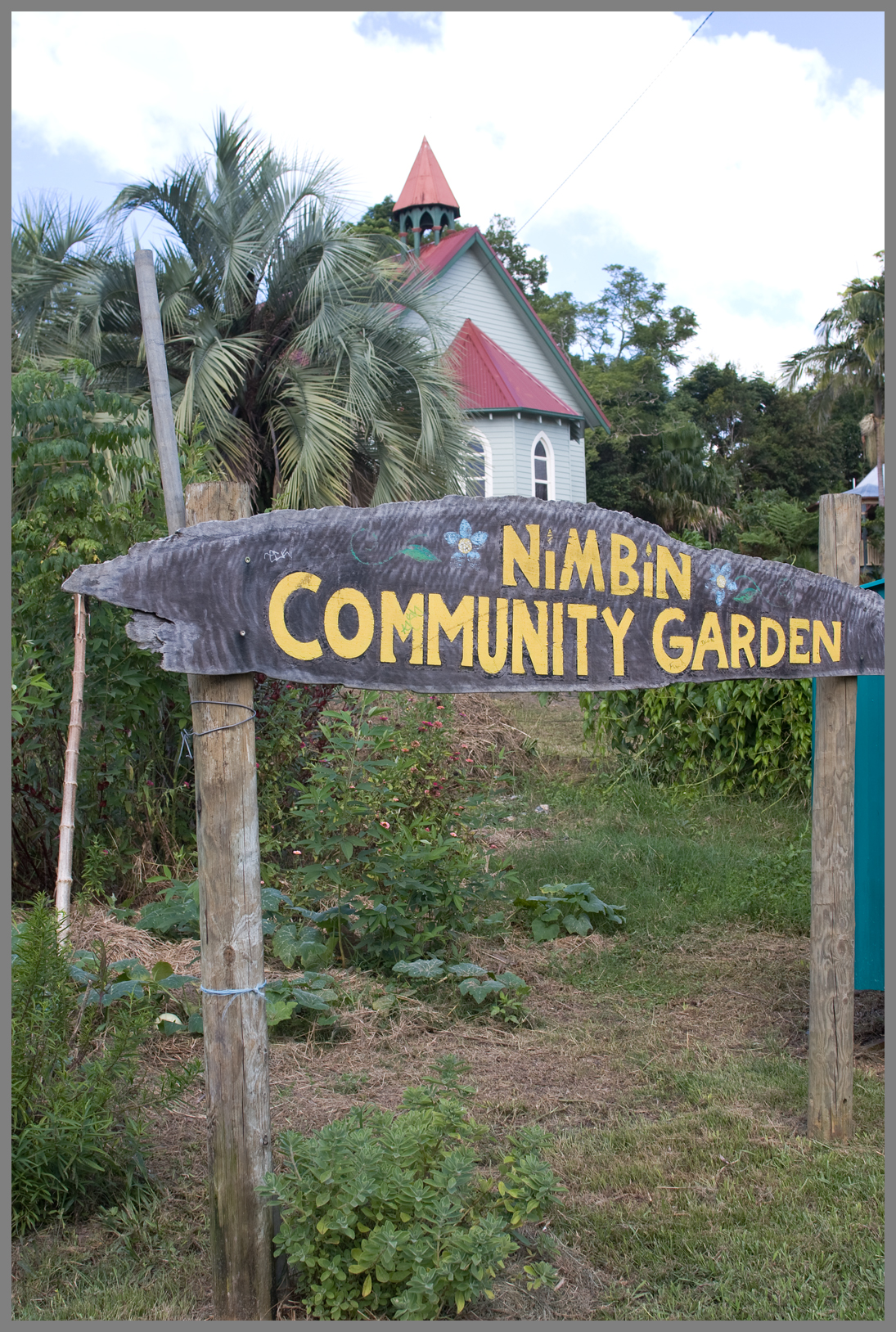
Community garden entrance, March 2008

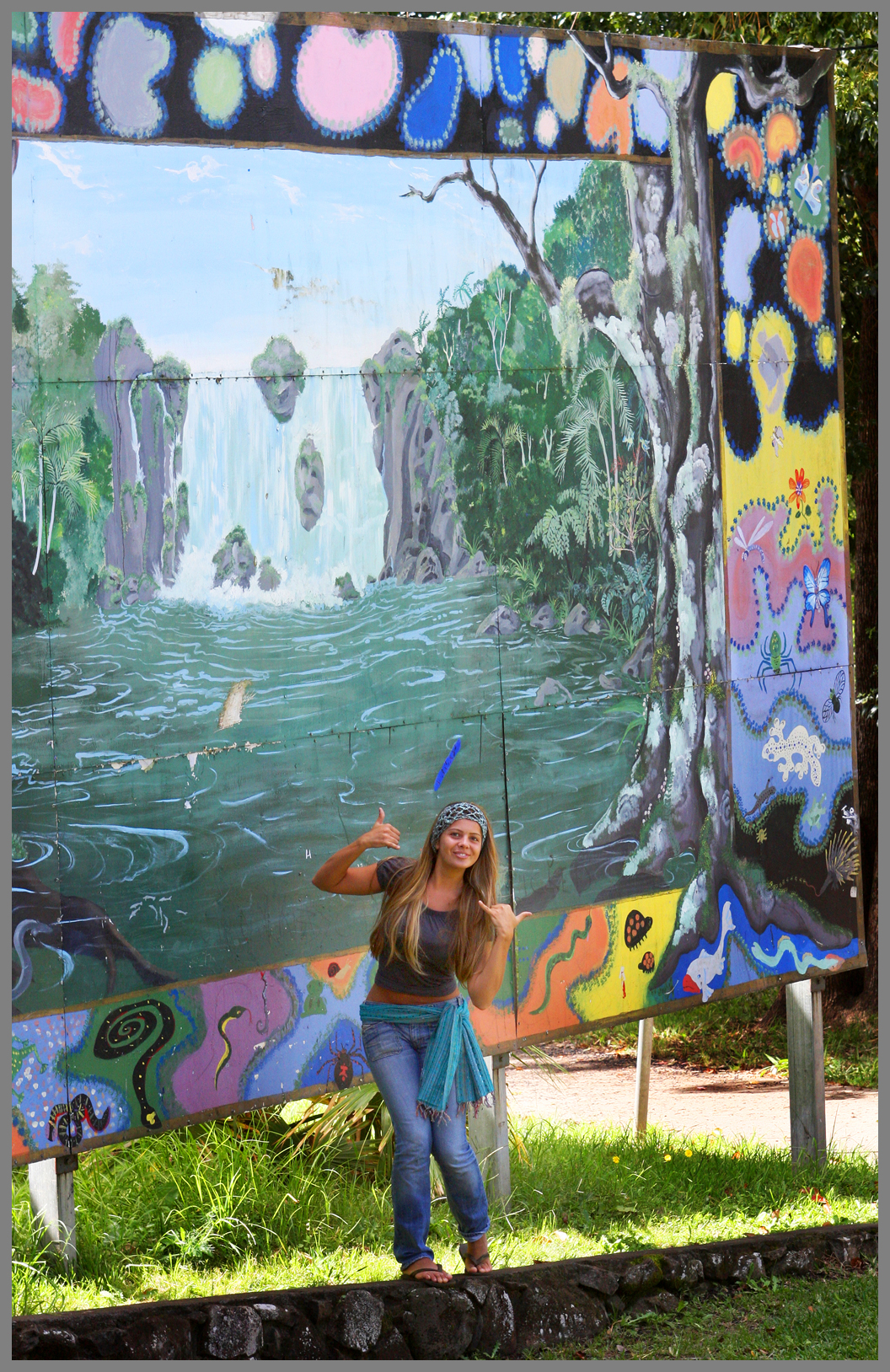
Visitor and street art in Nimbin, March 2008

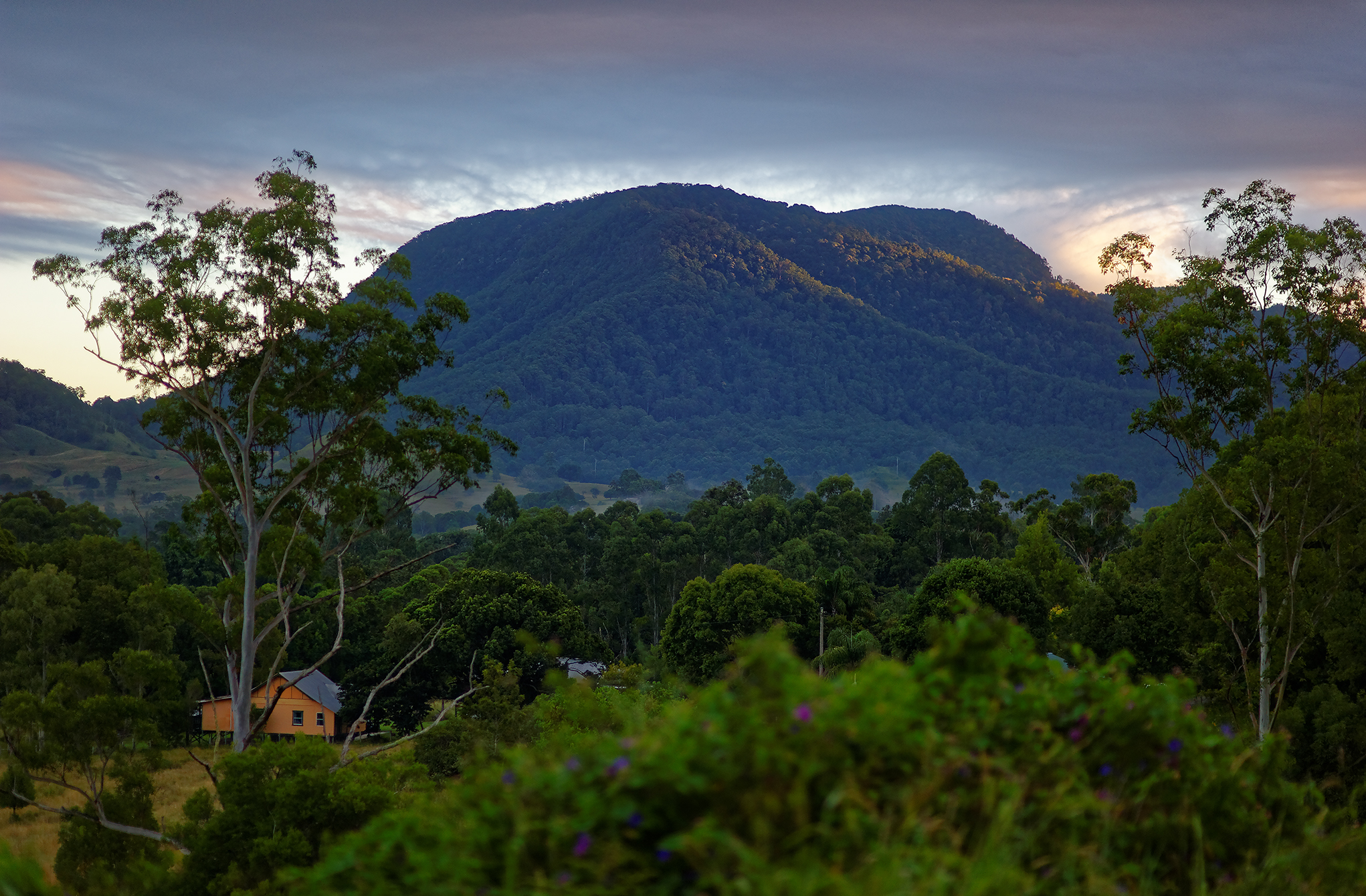
Nimbin, April 2007

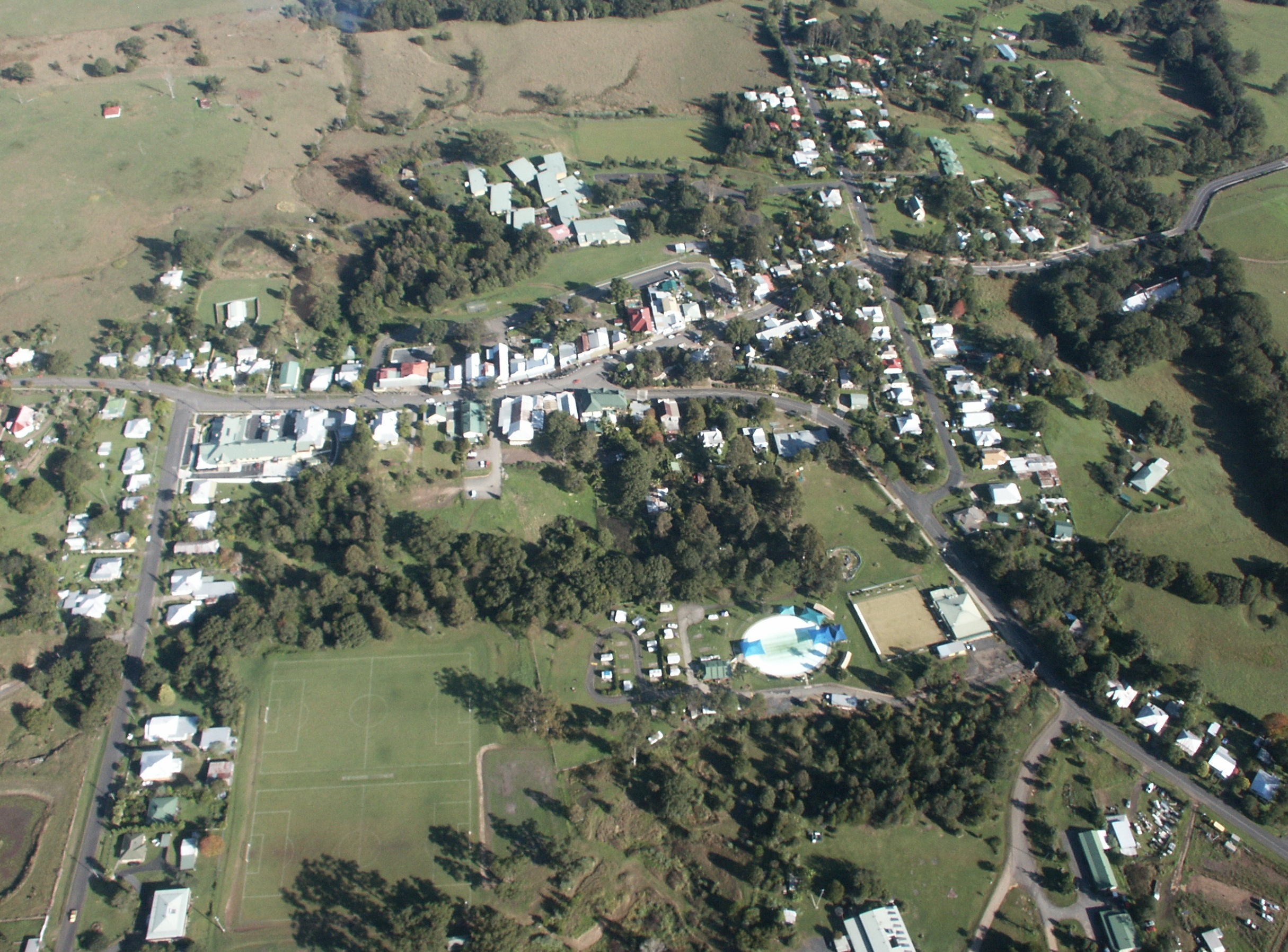
Nimbin, December 2005

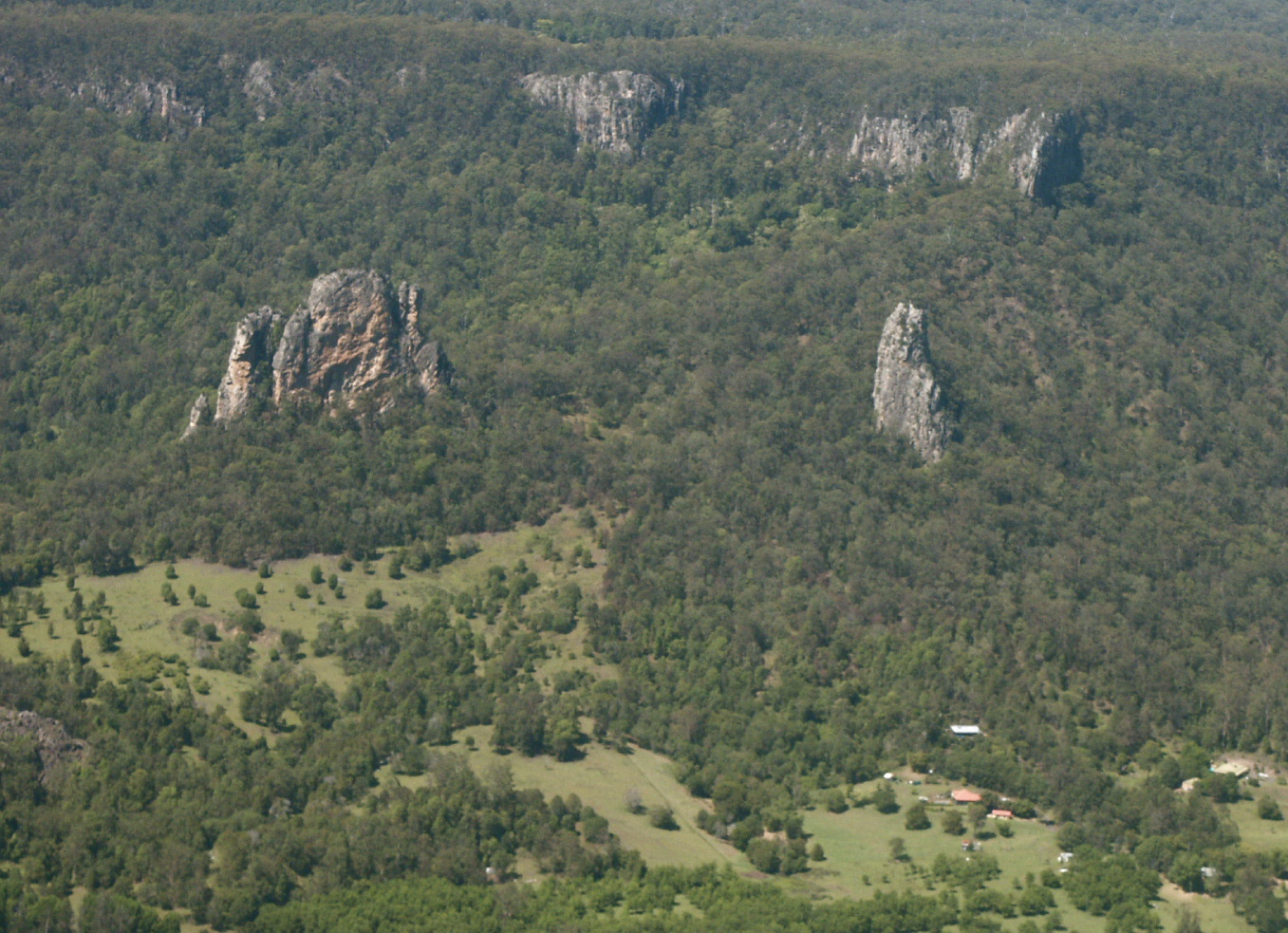
Nimbin Rocks, near Nimbin, December 2005

Welcome sign to the village, January 2007

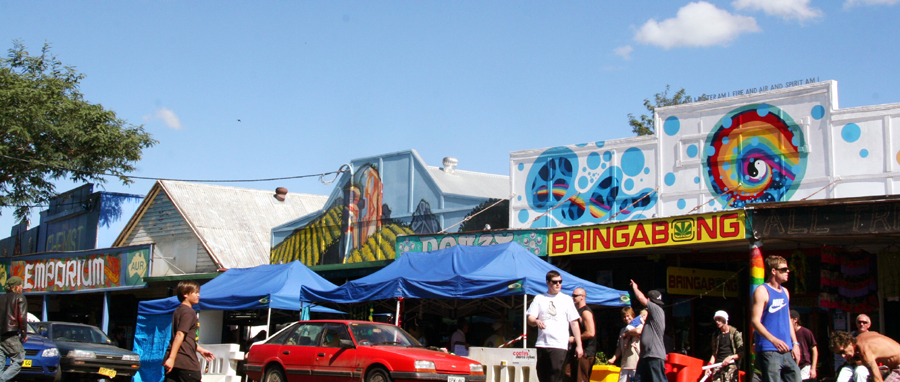
Nimbin, September 2008

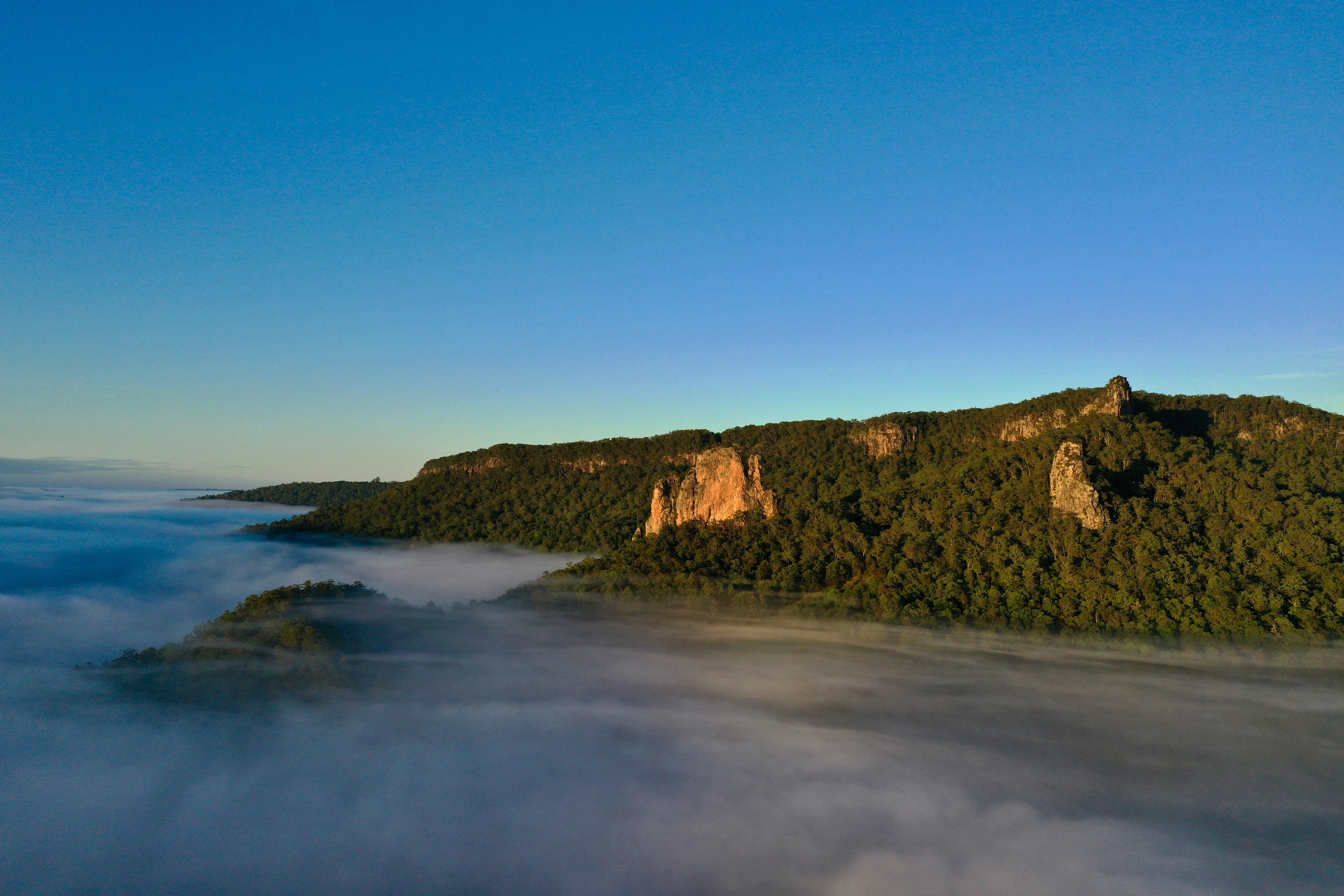
Nimbin Rocks in the Northern Rivers of NSW, May 2019

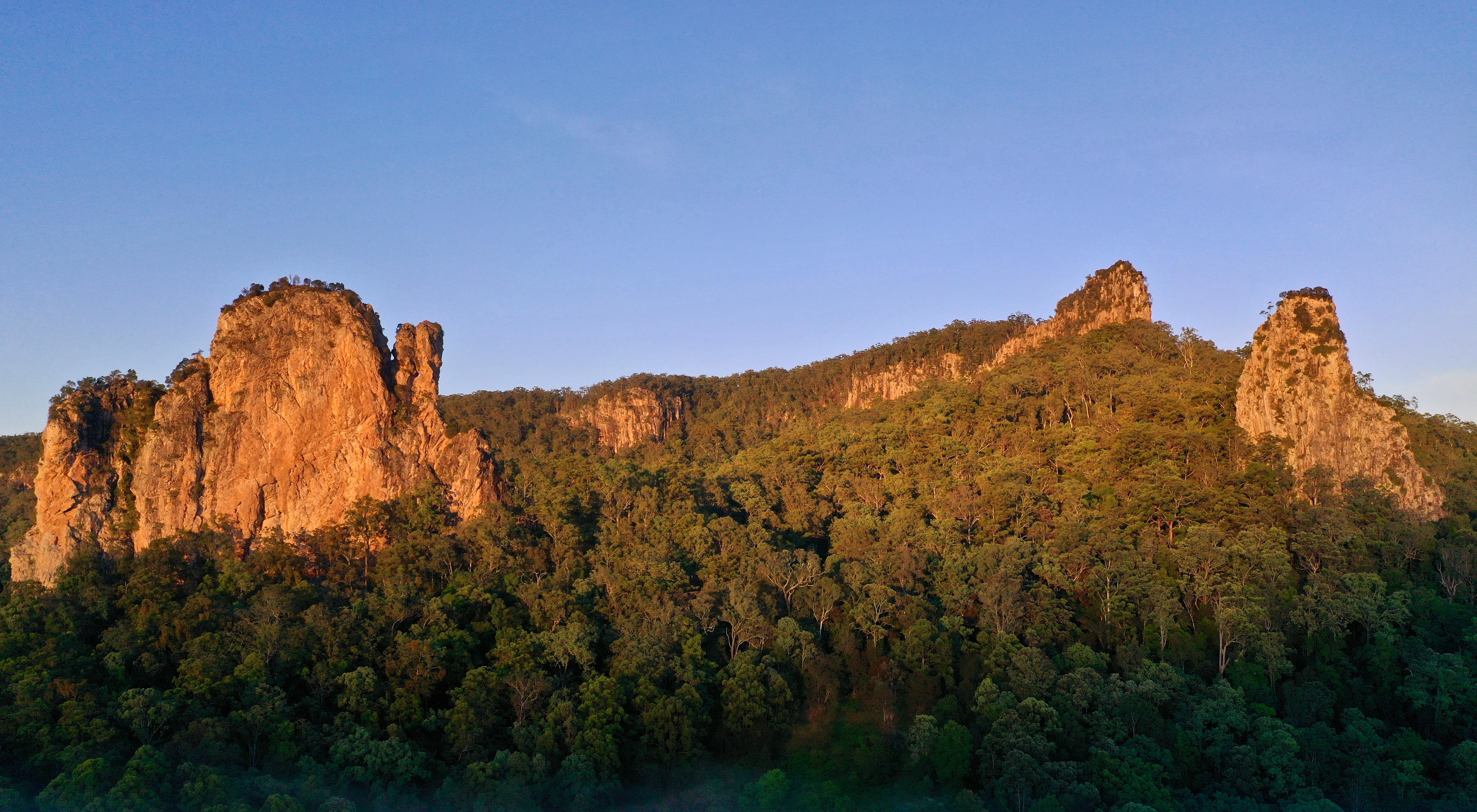
Nimbin Rocks, close-up in the morning sun, May 2019

== Sister cities ==
- Woodstock, United States
- Tākaka, New Zealand
- (United Kingdom) North Cave, England
- Freetown Christiania, Denmark

== See also ==
- Nightcap National Park
- Protected areas of New South Wales (Australia)
- ConFest, a long-running annual gathering
