= South Golden Beach =

Town in New South Wales, Australia

Coordinates: 28°29′45″S 153°32′45″E

South Golden Beach is a coastal town in Byron Shire, New South Wales, Australia. It is off the Pacific Highway, close to Byron Bay, Ocean Shores, Billinudgel and the Queensland border. To the north of South Golden beach is Pottsville, and Brunswick Heads to the south. At the 2021 census, South Golden Beach had a population of 2,219 people.

There is no service (fuel) station in the town, only a single takeaway food shop, and a community centre hall which is managed by volunteers under council delegation. More amenities and services can be found in neighbouring towns of New Brighton and Ocean Shores.
