= CDC NSW =

Australian bus company

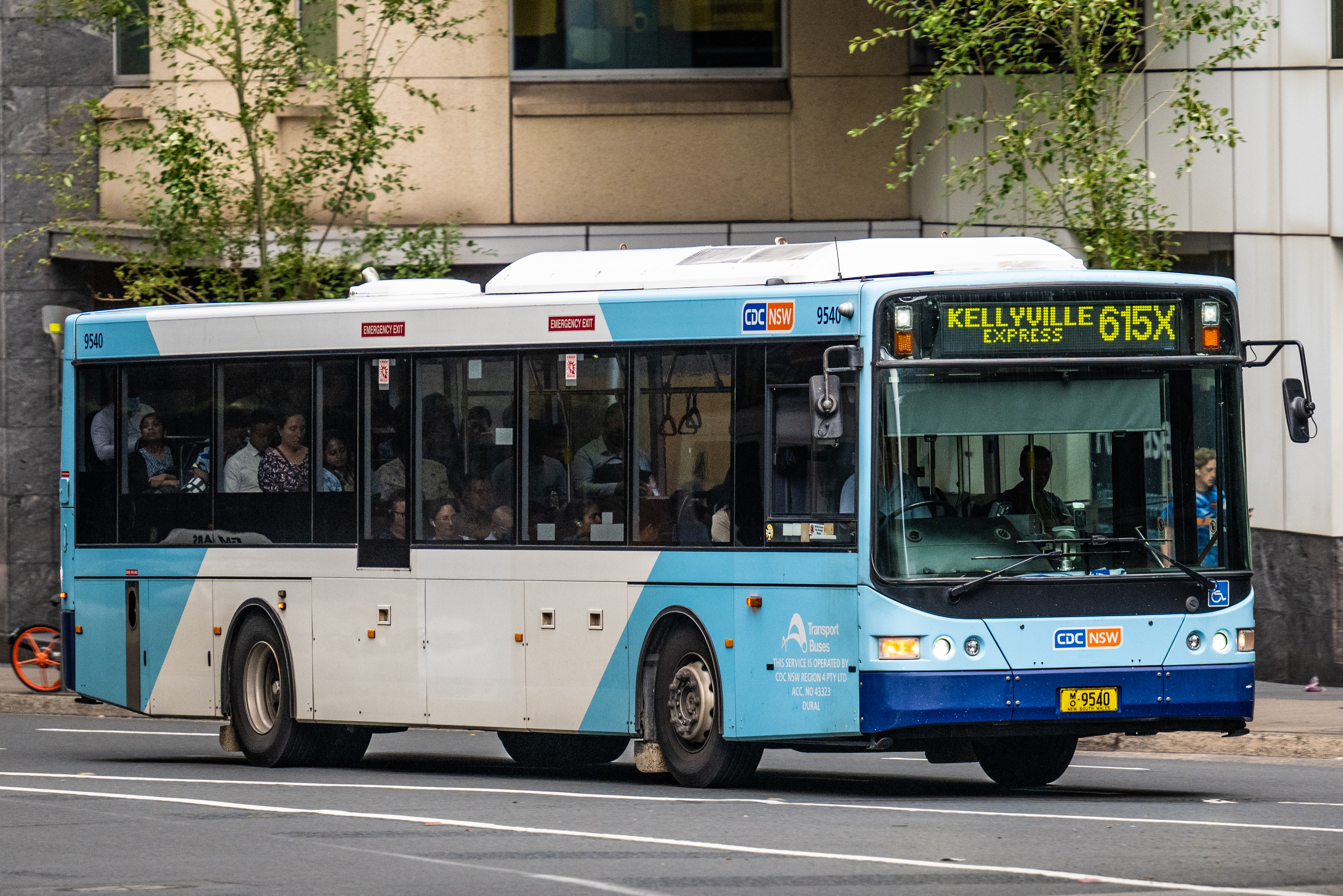
- Volgren bodied Scania K94UB in February 2024
- Parent: ComfortDelGro Australia
- Founded: 2005 (operations); 2017 (brand); 2019 (company)
- Headquarters: 29 Foundry Road; Seven Hills, New South Wales; 93 Lee Holm Road; St Marys, New South Wales
- Service area: Sydney; Blue Mountains; Central Coast; Hunter Region; Southern Tablelands; Mid North Coast; North West Slopes
- Service type: Bus operator
- Operator: Hunter Valley Buses; Blue Mountains Transit; CDC Broken Hill; CDC Canberra; Red Bus CDC NSW
- Chief executive: Joshua Peacock
- Website: cdcbus.com.au

CDC NSW is a bus operator in New South Wales, Australia. It is an umbrella brand of ComfortDelGro Australia established in 2017 to cover the latter's New South Wales operations, some of which had been owned by ComfortDelGro since 2005. It was subsequently established as a legal entity (company) in 2019. Beginning from 2023, its Hillsbus, Forest Coach Lines (Sydney only) and Blanch's Bus Company brands were phased out in favour of the CDC NSW brand.

The CDC NSW operations do not include CDC Broken Hill, even though the operation is located in New South Wales. The operation, together with CDC Mildura, is managed by CDC Victoria. However, CDC NSW includes CDC Canberra, which is actually based in the neighbouring New South Wales city of Queanbeyan despite its name.

== History ==
In 2016, Singaporean company ComfortDelGro bought out ComfortDelGro Cabcharge from its joint venture partner Cabcharge and renamed the company to ComfortDelGro Australia. The CDC NSW brand began to appear in early 2017 as an umbrella branding of ComfortDelGro Australia's operations in New South Wales, which at the time consisted of Hillsbus, Blue Mountains Transit, Hunter Valley Buses, QCity Transit, Transborder Express and Charterplus. The logo was introduced on its website in April 2017.

In following few years since, ComfortDelGro Australia acquired a number of bus companies in Australia, some in New South Wales such as Forest Coach Lines. However, until 2023, the majority of the New South Wales operations were not rebranded, unlike its Victorian counterparts which had been rebranded to CDC in 2014.

CDC NSW became the largest commuter bus operator in 2018/2019, with the acquisition of Forest Coach Lines, Coastal Liner and Blanch's Bus Company in that period.

In March 2022, ComfortDelGro Australia announced it intended to rebrand all of its operations in New South Wales under the CDC NSW brand. Following it successfully tendering to continue operating regions 4 and 14 in Sydney, ComfortDelGro Australia announced that its Forest Coach Lines (Sydney only) and Hillsbus subsidiaries would both be rebranded when the new contracts commence in April and May 2023. This was followed by the rebranding of Blanch's Bus Company and Brunswick Valley Coaches on 29 January 2024, and the remainder of Forest Coach Lines on 1 September 2025.

In February 2023, CDC NSW and Red Bus Services set up a joint venture known as Red Bus CDC NSW to bid on a renewed Sydney Outer Metropolitan Bus Region 7 contract, where Red Bus was the incumbent operator. A new eight-year contract was awarded to the joint venture in July 2023. On 6 July 2024, the new contract commenced and Red Bus Services was rebranded Red Bus CDC NSW. Effective from the same day, the Sloane family (owners of Red Bus) sold Red Bus and its 50% shareholding in the joint venture to CDC NSW, with Red Bus CDC NSW fully owned by CDC NSW.

== Operations ==
=== Sydney ===
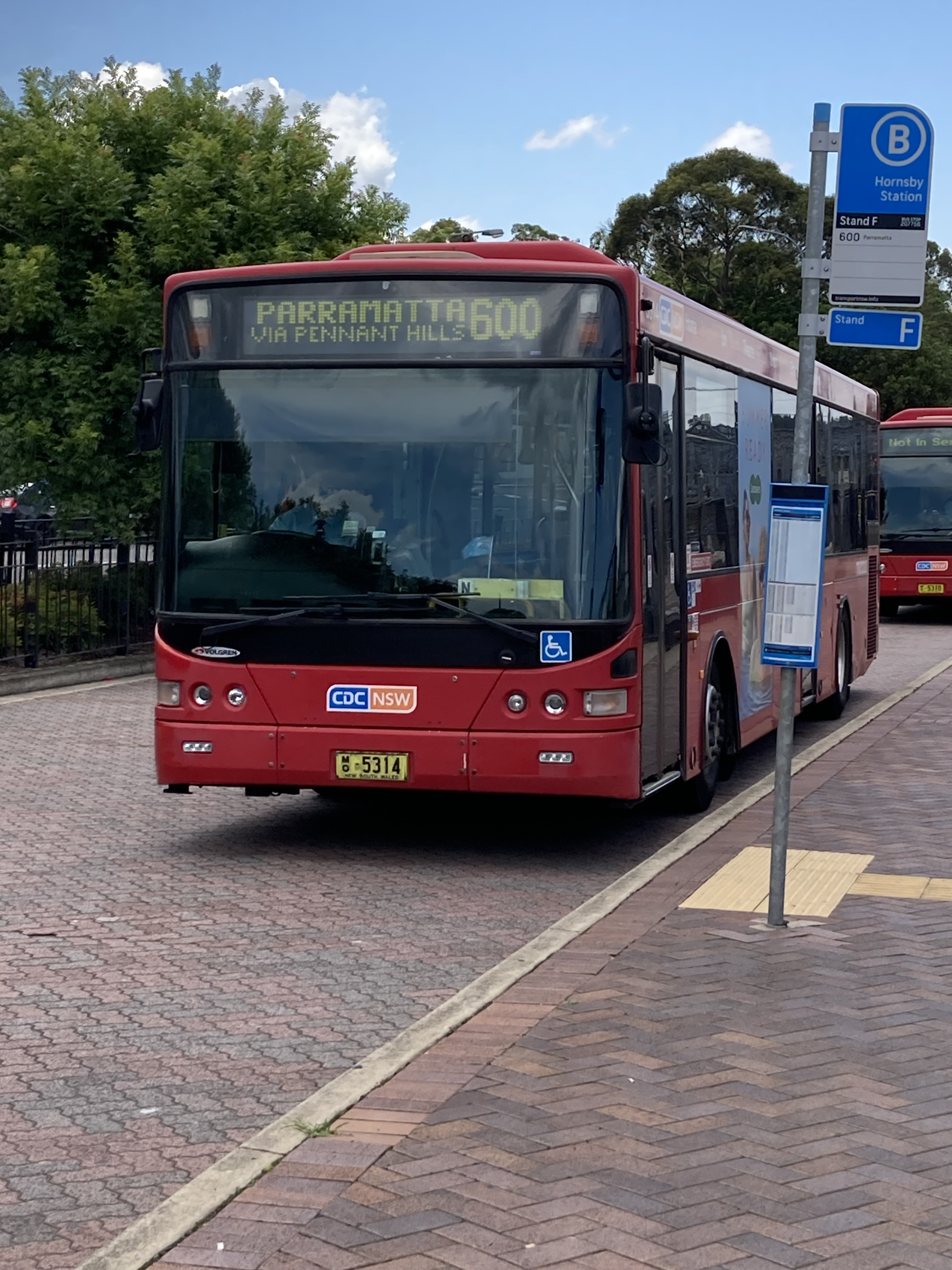
Volgren bodied Volvo B7RLE (still in Metrobus livery) in December 2023

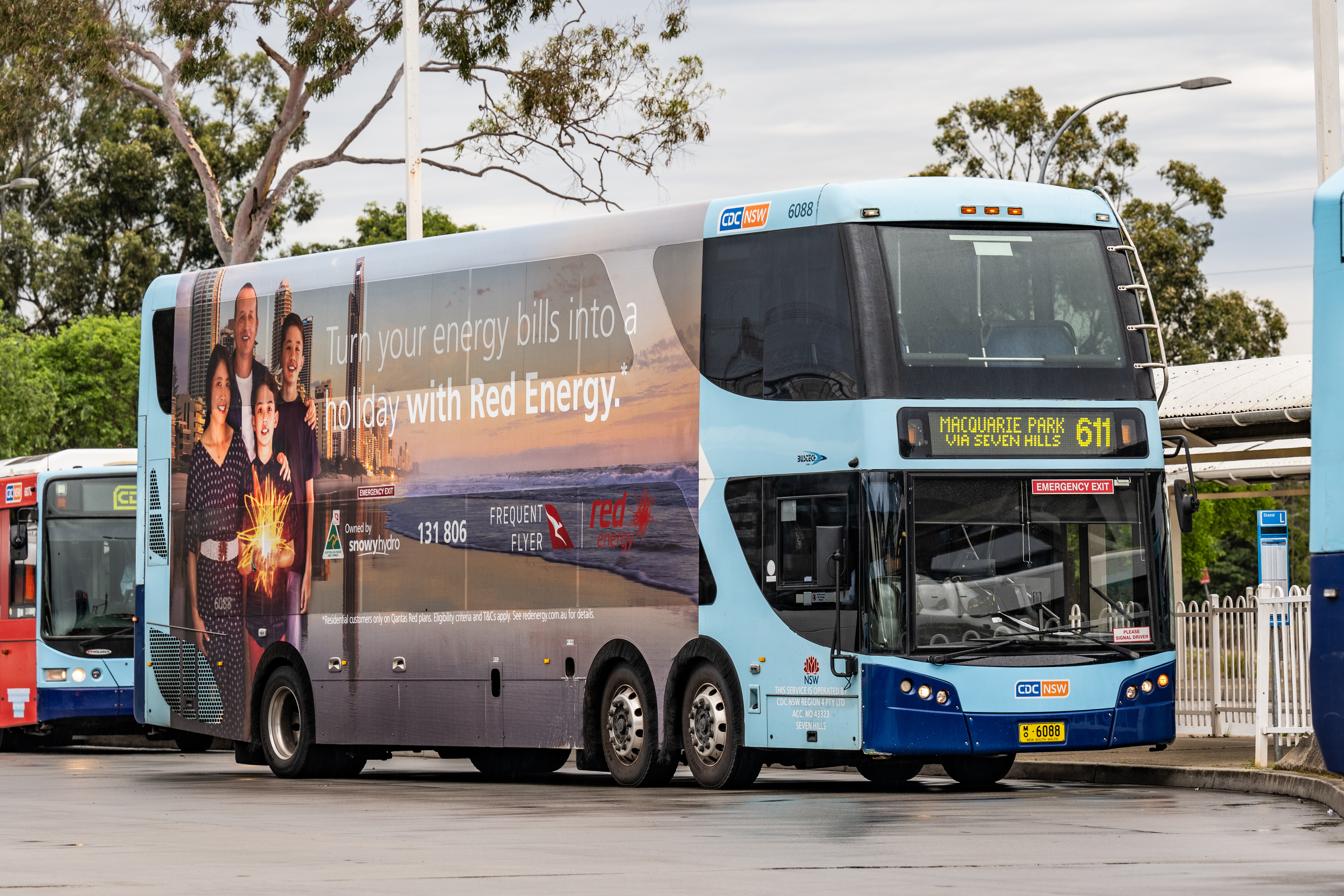
A Bustech CDi at Blacktown station

Within Sydney, CDC NSW operates bus services in two bus regions:

- Sydney Bus Region 4: the Hills District since 2005, initially using the Hillsbus branding until it was phased out in 2023.
- Sydney Bus Region 14: the Northern Suburbs since 2018, initially using the Forest Coach Lines branding until it was also phased out in 2023.

In November 2022, it was announced that CDC NSW retained Regions 4 and 14, including Region 12 which was consolidated into Region 14. The Hillsbus and Forest Coach Lines (only the Sydney operations) brands were phased out in favour of the CDC NSW brand, with the new contracts for Regions 4 and 14 commencing in April and May 2023 respectively. As a result of Region 12 consolidating into Region 14, CDC NSW also took over services from Transdev NSW.

CDC NSW operates the following services in Sydney:

- Bus routes 141, 193 to 197, 260, 270 to 274, 277 to 279, 281 to 284 in Sydney's Northern Suburbs and Northern Beaches (Chatswood, Gordon, St Ives, Frenchs Forest, Brookvale, Mona Vale)
- Bus routes 556 to 599 in Sydney's upper north shore (Hornsby, Gordon, St Ives, Macquarie Park, Chatswood)
- Bus routes 600 to 665 in Sydney's north-western suburbs, including
  - 600 (formerly Metrobus M60) from Pennant Hills to Parramatta
  - 610X (formerly Metrobus M61) from Castle Hill to Queen Victoria Building.
  - 66x series along the North West T-Way (formerly T6x series)
  - Express services along the M2 Hills Motorway and Lane Cove Tunnel to Macquarie Park, North Sydney and Queen Victoria Building
- Bus routes 700 to 715 in Sydney's western suburbs (Wentworthville, Seven Hills, Blacktown)

CDC NSW also operated route 535 from Parramatta to Carlingford until January 2025. The route was a rail replacement bus service for the closed Carlingford railway line, until the line was converted and re-opened as part of the Parramatta Light Rail in December 2024. Unlike other bus routes, route 535 charged train fares instead of bus fares.

As of February 2026, CDC NSW in Sydney (excluding CDC Charter) operates 743 buses (including 10 electric buses) across 5 depots:

- Foundry Road in Seven Hills – Head Office of CDC NSW – 197 buses
- Dural – 190 buses
- Rouse Hill – 149 buses
- Terrey Hills – 107 buses
- Mount Kuring-gai – 100 buses

CDC NSW also used to have a depots at Northmead and another at Hartley Road, Seven Hills. Both were closed in April 2025 and were replaced with a new purpose built depot at Rouse Hill.

=== Regional New South Wales ===
Outside of Sydney, CDC NSW also operates scheduled route, school bus and coach services in Northern NSW, including Ballina, Lennox Head, Byron Bay, Mullumbimby, Coffs Harbour, Grafton, Narrabri, Sawtel, Wee Waa, and Woolgoolga.

As of February 2026, CDC NSW in Northern NSW operates 137 buses out of eight depots:

- Ballina – 19 buses
- Billinudgel – 14 buses
- Byron Bay – 17 buses
- Coffs Harbour – 13 buses
- Sawtell (Toormina) – 33 buses
- Woolgoolga – 20 buses
- Narrabri – 13 buses
- Wee Waa – 8 buses

=== Other operations ===
The following CDC NSW operations have their own separate branding or name.

==== Hunter Valley Buses ====
Hunter Valley Buses is a bus operator who operates bus, coach and charter services in the Central Coast and Hunter regions of New South Wales. Previously known as Blue Ribbon, it was one of the first companies to be bought by ComfortDelGro Cabcharge in 2005. Since 2008, Hunter Valley Buses' services have formed Outer Sydney Metropolitan Bus Regions 2 and 4. In August 2018, its service area expanded to include Outer Sydney Metropolitan Bus Region 11 after the purchase of Coastal Liner.

==== CDC Charter ====
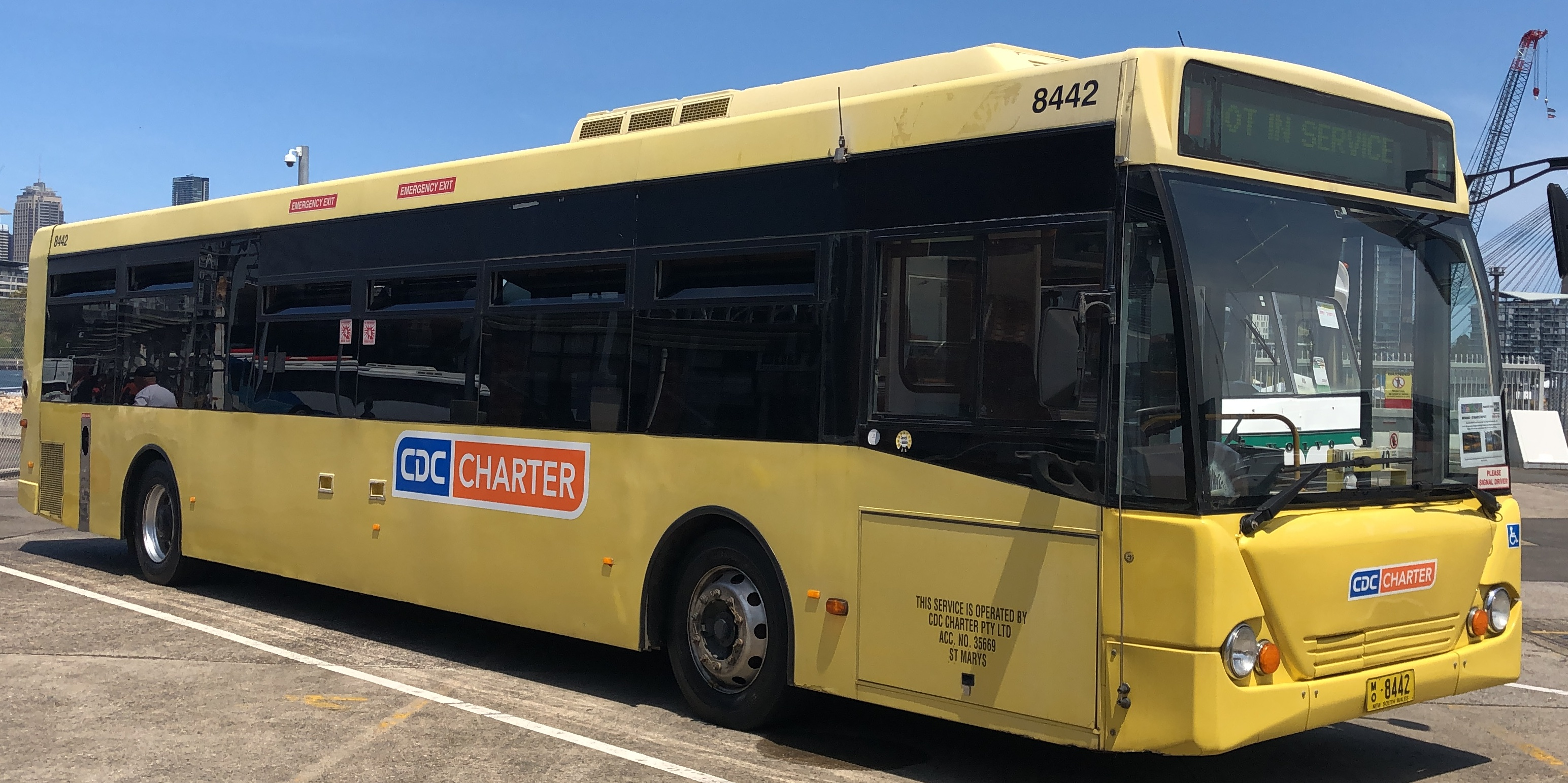
CDC Charter Custom Coaches 550 Mercedes-Benz O405NH

CDC Charter is CDC's bus charter division. It organises charters for the CDC group, CDC rail bus workings, as well as CDC's special event commitments.

Initially established as Charterplus in 2008 to centralise the charter operations between the Hillsbus depots, this was expanded to the Westbus depots in 2009. Charterplus was renamed CDC Travel in November 2018, and covered Sydney and Blue Mountains, while charter operations in other areas were covered by their respective local CDC bus company. Charterplus was originally based at Bonnyrigg, but after the rename, all Sydney CDC Travel vehicles were then based at the St Marys depot, while others were based in the Blue Mountains.

In early 2023, CDC Travel became part of the new CDC Charter brand, which covers all of CDC's charter operations within the state. This included the charter operations of Coastal Liner. Both CDC Travel and Coastal Liner brands were gradually phased out for CDC Charter.

As of February 2026, CDC Charter operates 110 buses across 3 depots (St Marys, Cromer, Halloran), transferred from both the New South Wales and Victorian operations.

==== Blue Mountains Transit ====
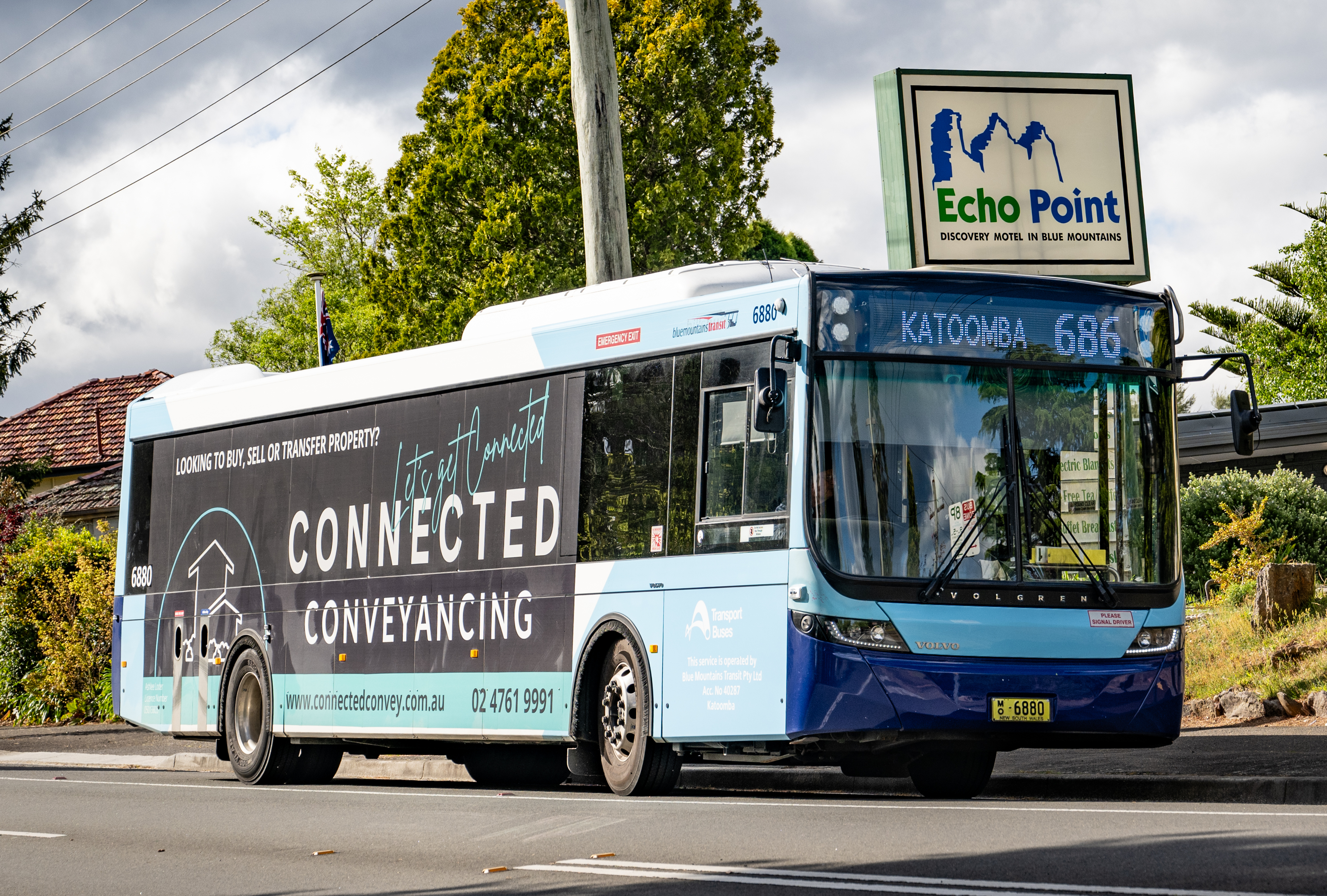
Blue Mountains Transit Volgren bodied Volvo B7RLE in Katoomba

In August 2014, CDC purchased Blue Mountains Bus Company with 101 buses. It operated depots in Emu Plains, Leura and Valley Heights. Founded in 1951 as Pearce Omnibus, it operated services in the lower Blue Mountains. In 1999, it expanded with the purchase of Katoomba-Leura Bus Service, followed in 2002 by Blue Mountains Bus Co. On 1 December 2014, CDC formally took over the operations of Blue Mountains Bus Company and rebranded it as Blue Mountains Transit.

As of February 2026, Blue Mountains Transit operates 74 buses.

==== CDC Canberra ====
In September 2012, CDC purchased Deane's Transit Group which comprised Deane's Buslines which operates local services in Queanbeyan and into Canberra, and Transborder Express which runs services between Yass, Murrumbateman, Hall and Canberra. Both brands also operate school services within their service region. On 8 July 2013, Deane's Buslines was rebranded as Qcity Transit.

In January 2023, Qcity Transit and Transborder Express were rebranded as CDC Canberra.

As of February 2026, the CDC Canberra fleet consists of 155 buses.

==== Red Bus CDC NSW ====
Red Bus CDC NSW is a bus operator which operates in the Central Coast region. Since 2024, Red Bus CDC NSW have formed Outer Sydney Metropolitan Bus Region 7. Red Bus CDC NSW was initially formed as a joint venture with Red Bus, who was the incumbent operator for Region 7 prior to 2024, and as part of a new bus contract, the joint venture was to take over Red Bus as the operator for Region 7 in July 2024. Effective from the start of the contract, CDC NSW acquired Red Bus Service and gained full ownership of the operation.

== Former operations ==
While CDC NSW was only established in 2017, Westbus and Hillsbus were two of the first three New South Wales bus companies to be acquired by ComfortDelgro Cabcharge in 2005.

=== Westbus ===
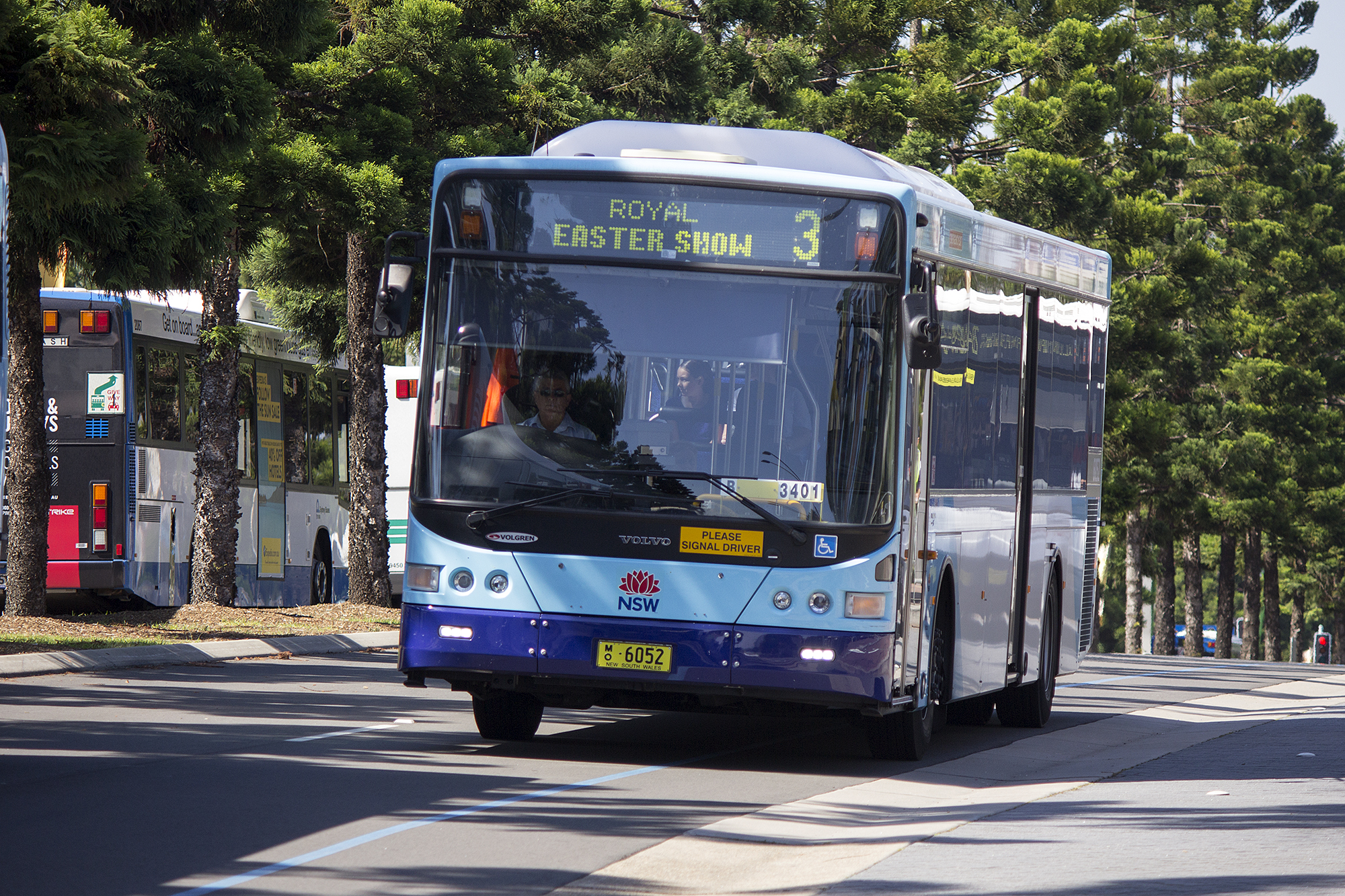
Westbus Volgren bodied Volvo B7RLE at Sydney Olympic Park in March 2013

Westbus was a bus operator who operated bus services in Western Sydney. It was one of the first companies to be bought by ComfortDelGro Cabcharge in 2005. Until its cessation, Westbus' services were part of Sydney Bus Regions 1 and 3. In 2012, these regions were put out to tender by Transport for NSW. Westbus' bids to retain both regions were not successful, with the Region 1 services operating out of St Marys and Windsor passing to Busways, while the Region 3 services operated by Bonnyrigg and Girraween passing to Transit Systems, both in October 2013. As a result, Westbus ceased to operate routes, with remaining bus fleet transferred to other ComfortDelGro Cabcharge subsidiaries.

=== Hillsbus ===
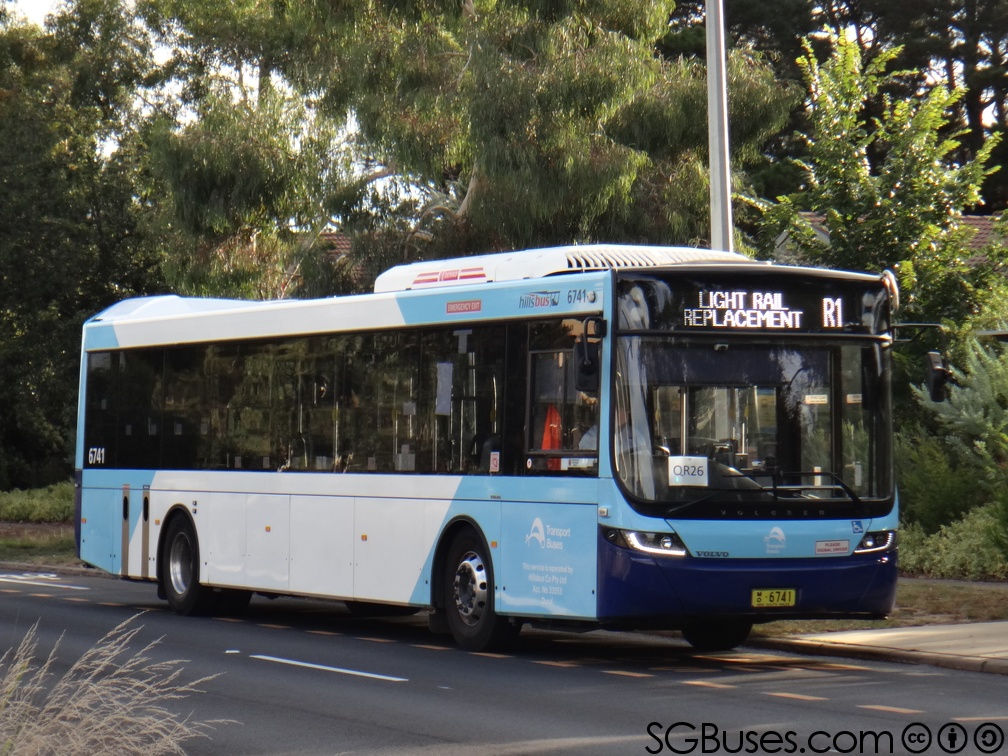
Hillsbus Volgren bodied Volvo B7RLE in January 2021

Hillsbus was a bus operator which operated bus services in the Hills District. It was one of the first companies to be bought by ComfortDelGro Cabcharge in 2005. In August 2013, Hillsbus successfully tendered to operate the Region 4 services for another five years from August 2014. The Hillsbus brand was phased out and replaced by the CDC NSW brand in 2023.

=== Blanch's Bus Company ===
Blanch's Bus Company, established in 1976, operated scheduled route and school bus services in the Ballina, Lennox Head, Byron Bay and Mullumbimby areas of Northern NSW out of depots in Ballina and Billinudgel. Since 2010, it also owned Brunswick Valley Coaches, while retaining the latter's brand.

Blanch's Bus Company and Brunswick Valley Coaches were acquired by ComfortDelGro in April 2019. Both brands were phased out and replaced by the CDC NSW brand in January 2024. At the time, the fleet consisted of 46 buses.

=== Forest Coach Lines ===
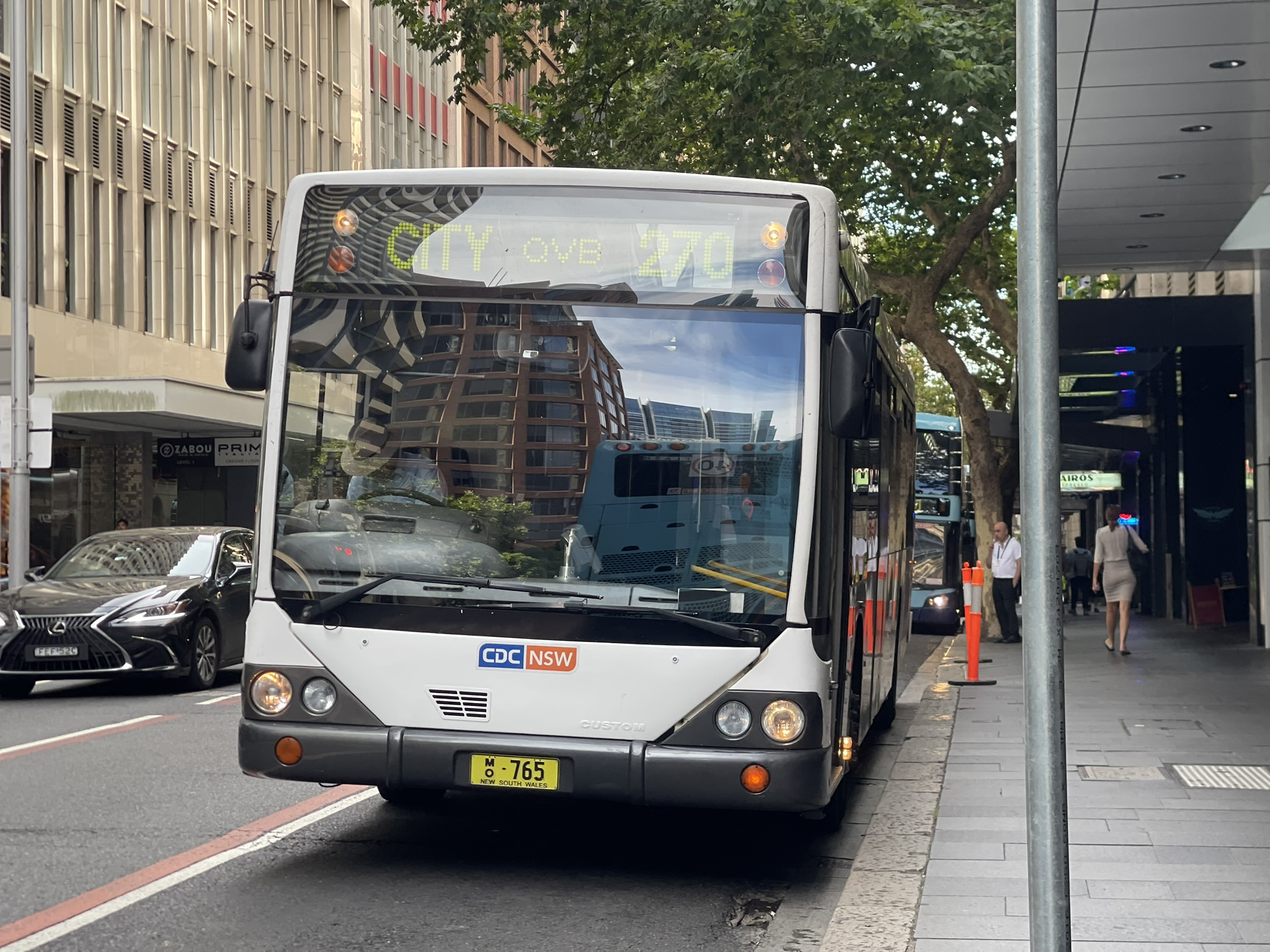
A Custom Coaches-bodied Volvo B12BLE, previously operated by Forest Coach Lines

Forest Coach Lines was a bus and coach operator which operated in the Northern Suburbs of Sydney in Sydney Bus Region 14, as well as the Mid North Coast, and North West Slopes regions in New South Wales. Forest Coach Lines was acquired by ComfortDelGro in August 2018.

In October 2021, CDC merged its newly acquired school bus business from KA & VK Stubbs Pty Ltd into its Forest Coach Lines business in Narrabri and Wee Waa.

The Forest brand in Sydney was phased out and replaced by the CDC NSW brand in 2023 and the remainder of the Forest brand was phased out in 2025.
