= Transborder =

Transborder may refer to:

- Transborder agglomeration, a conurbation that extends into multiple territories.
- Transborder Express, a bus company based in Canberra, Australia.
- Trans-Border Institute, an institute at the University of San Diego, United States.

== See also ==
- Border
- Cross-border region
