= Ocean Shores, New South Wales =

Town in New South Wales, Australia

Ocean Shores New South Wales
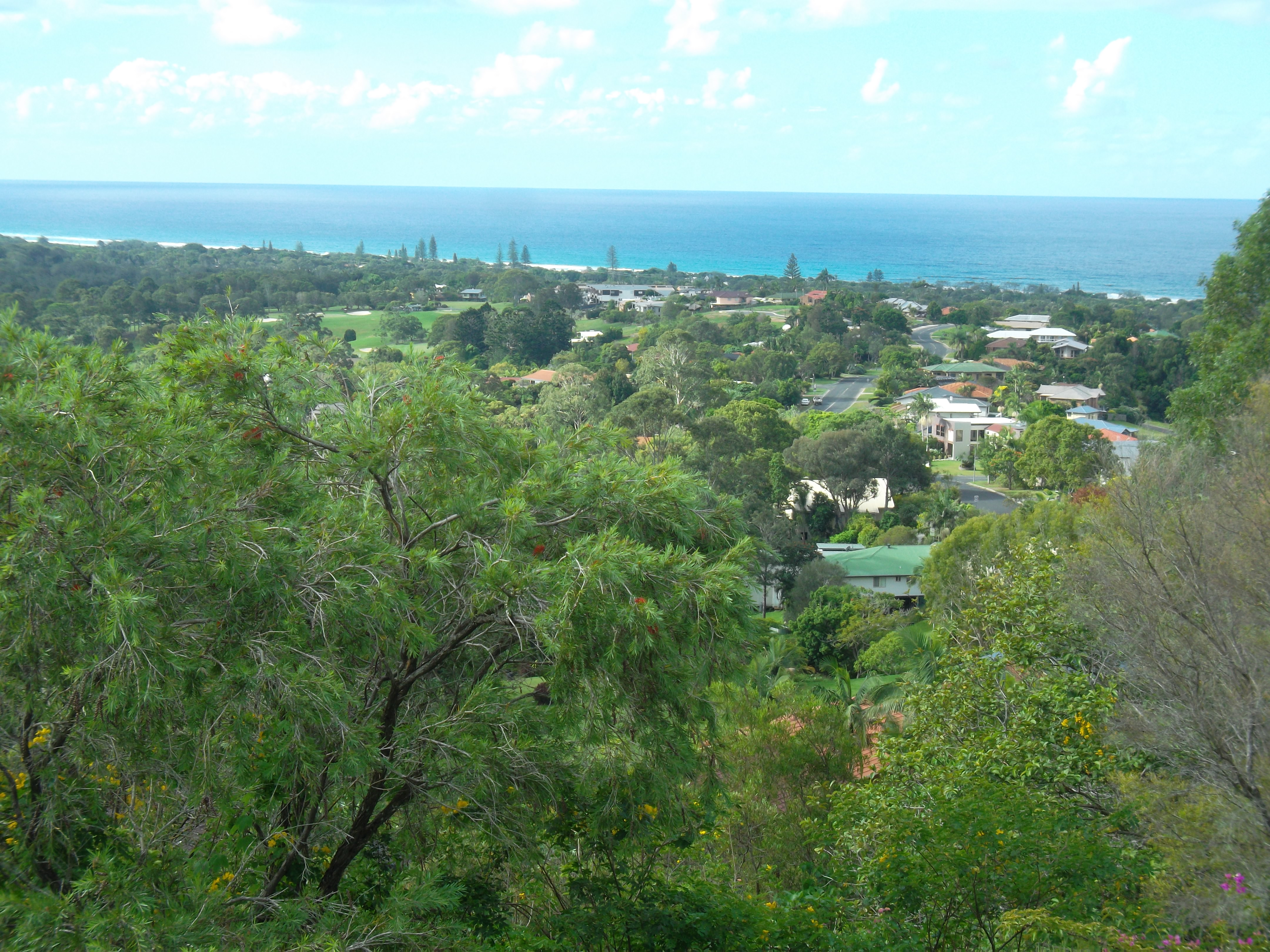
- View of Ocean Shores from Lookout Park

- Coordinates: 28°31′19″S 153°32′24″E
- Population: 4,818 (2021 census)
- Established: 1977
- Postcode(s): 2483
- Elevation: 3 m (10 ft)
- Location: 780 km (485 mi) from Sydney; 147 km (91 mi) from Brisbane; 20 km (12 mi) from Byron Bay
- LGA(s): Byron Shire
- State electorate(s): Ballina
- Federal division(s): Richmond
Mean max temp	Mean min temp	Annual rainfall
?	?	1,723.5 mm 67.9 in

Ocean Shores is a coastal town in the Northern Rivers region of New South Wales, Australia with Billinudgel to the north and South Golden Beach and New Brighton to the east of the town. Established in 1977, Ocean Shores was originally a land holding owned by Wendell West of Washington with backing from American singer Pat Boone, and was named after Boone's residence in Ocean Shores, Washington. It is located in the Brunswick Valley – a valley including the towns of Mullumbimby and Brunswick Heads. The town has a local shopping complex and a large golf course. At the 2021 census, Ocean Shores had a population of 4,818 people.

== Climate ==
Ocean Shores has a subtropical climate. Summer is generally warm to hot with a few days reaching above 30 degrees. Winter is cool to mild with around two days under 14 degrees. Normal day maximums are around 20 degrees. Spring and autumn are mild to warm, with maximums around 25 and higher with few days below it. Winds come from all directions which means there are warm northerly days or mild southerly days. Spring is dry and windy. Thunderstorms are also common in summer.

== Geography ==
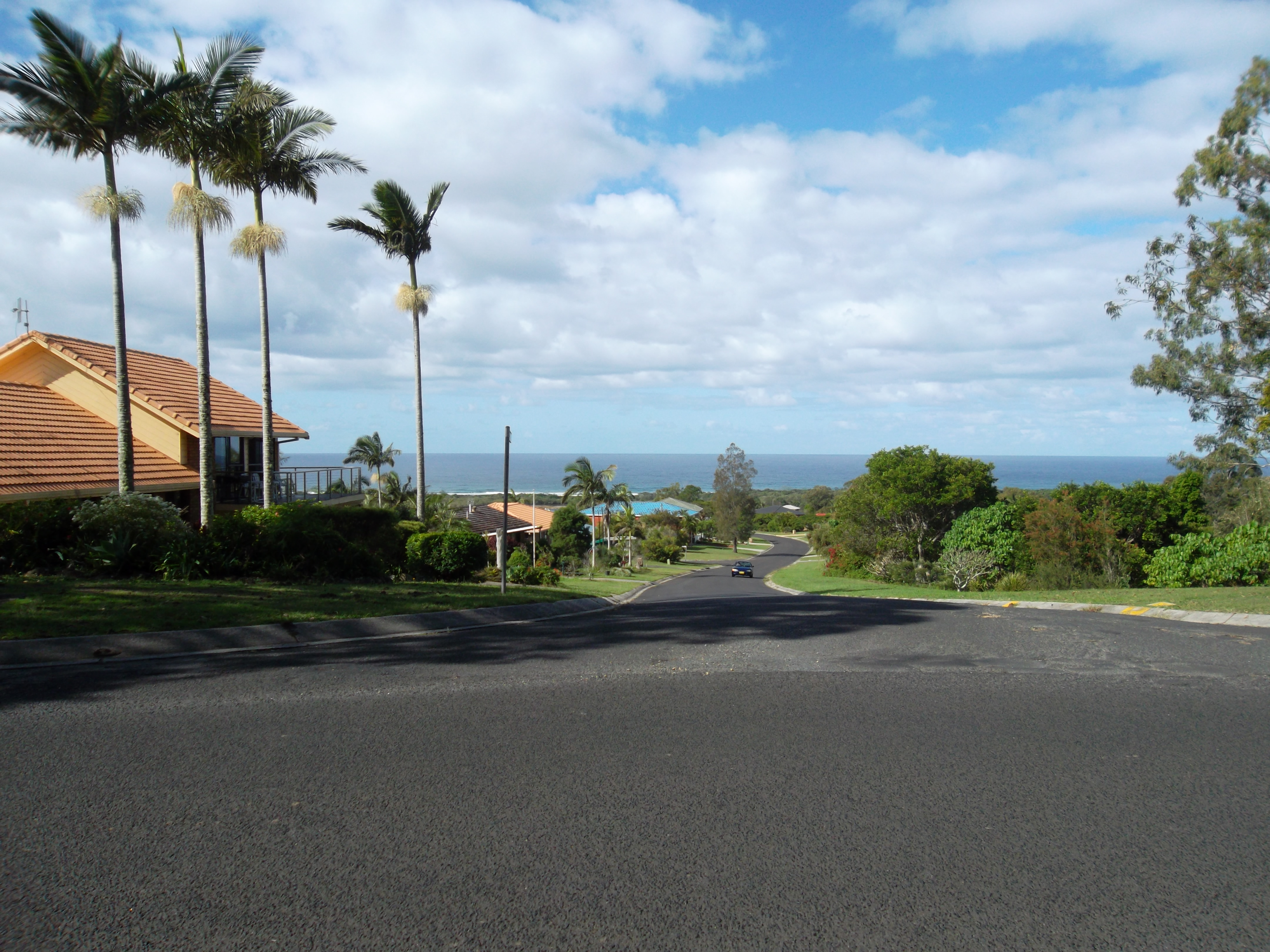
Yallakool Drive

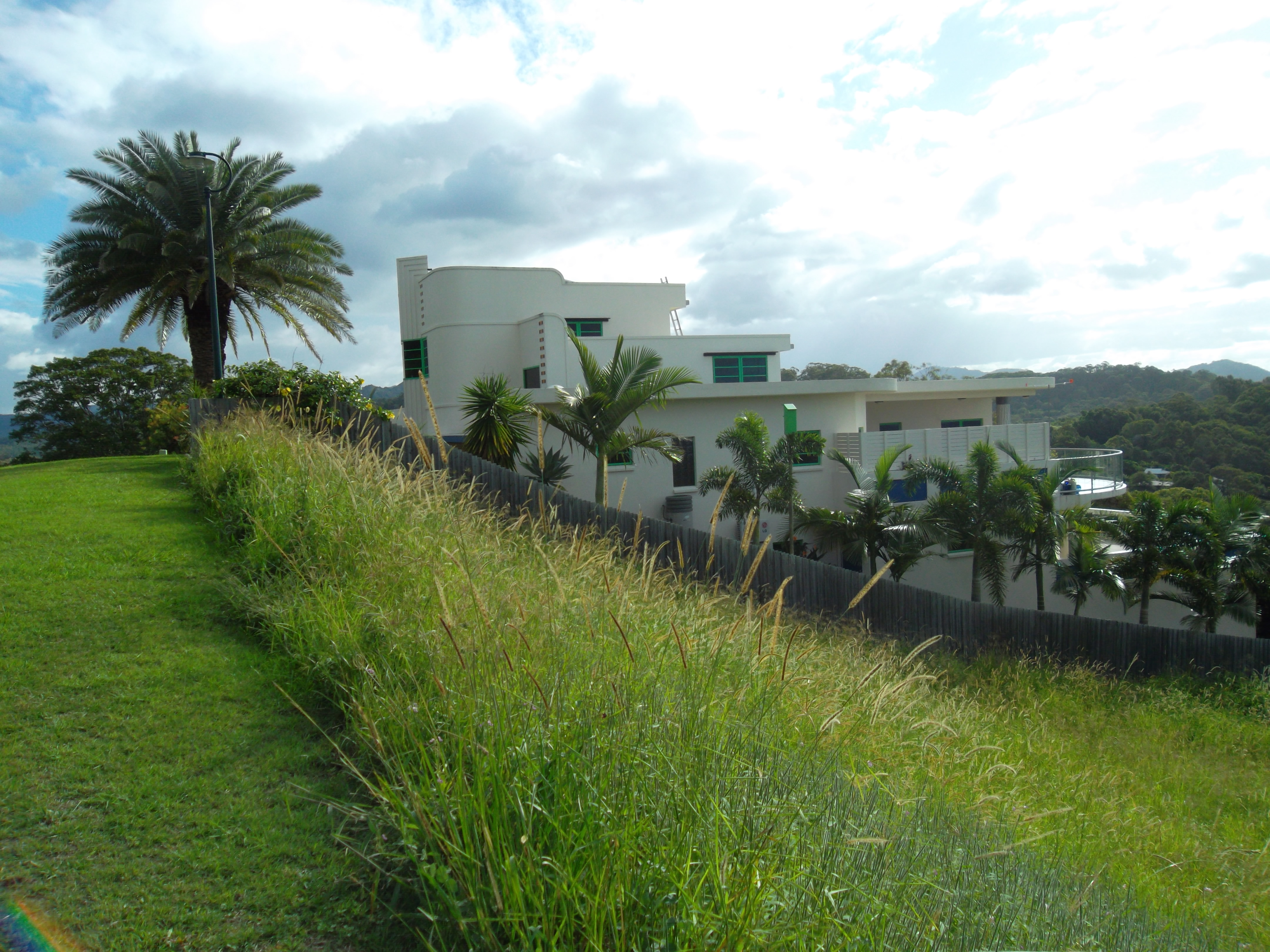
A private residence

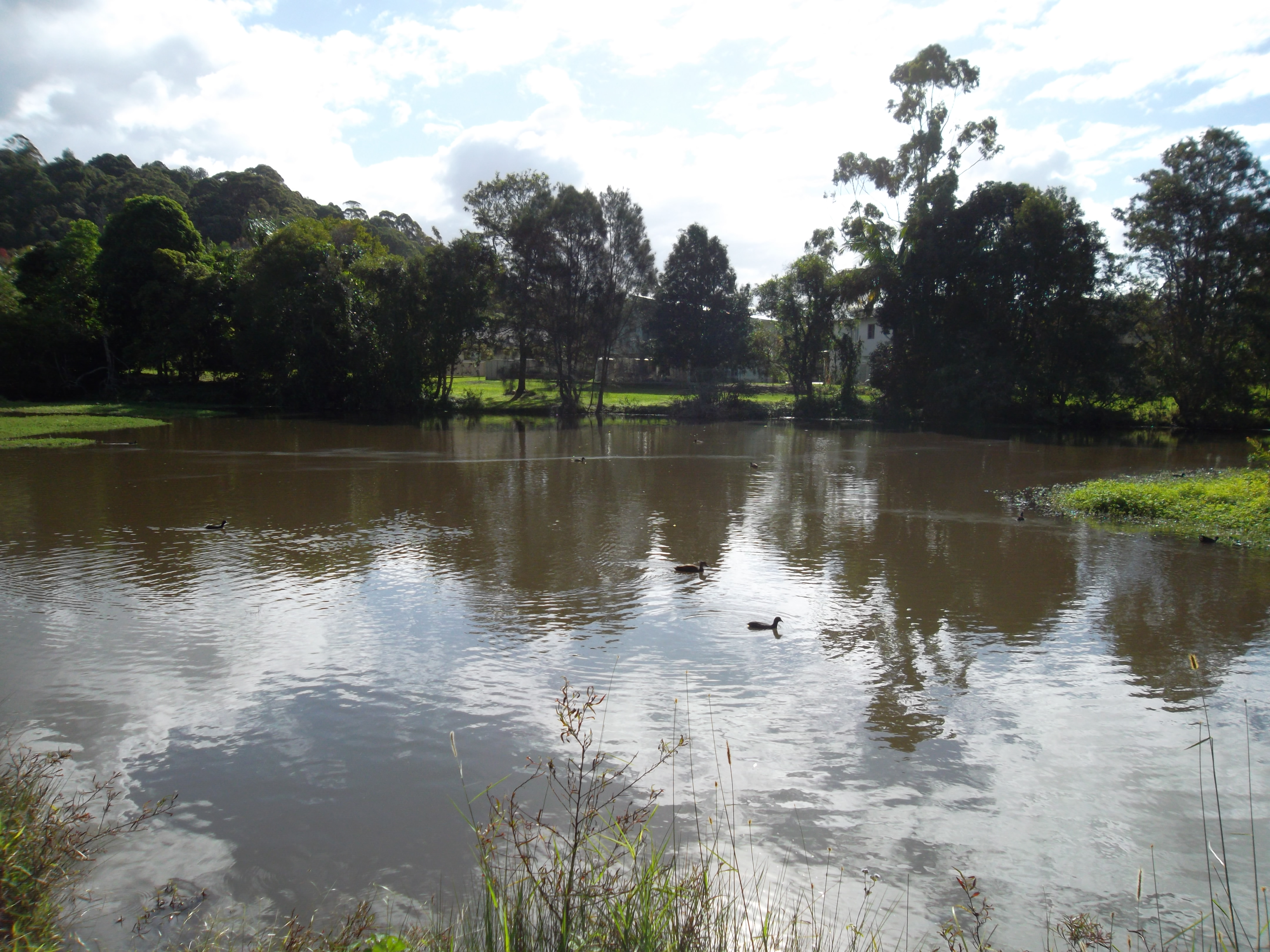
Water Lily Park

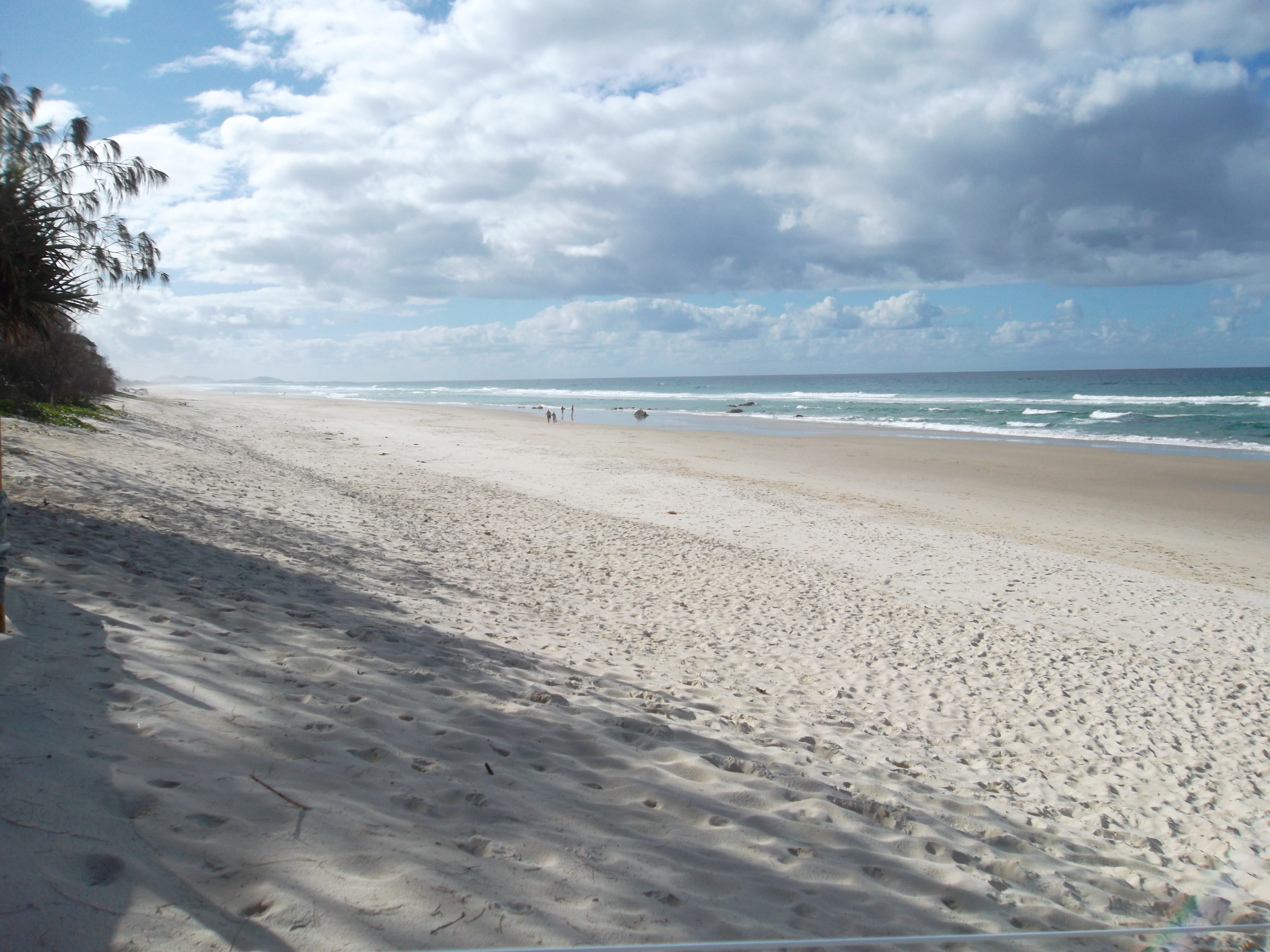
The beach

Southern Ocean Shores is located on the edge of the Brunswick River catchment, which means most of the terrain is elevated and has sea views. Northern Ocean Shores is located on mostly flat land on the beach. The north arm of the Brunswick River weaves through the north of the town.

Ocean Shores Public School and Ocean Shores Pre-School are located in Ocean Shores North. Ocean Shores Public School was established in 1993 after relocating the Billinudgel Public School to the new school at Ocean Shores.

A canal called 'Capriconia Canal' runs through Ocean Shores North and connects to Yelgun Creek. Most of Ocean Shores North lies next to the Billinudgel Nature Reserve.

Ocean Shores is located on the New South Wales side of the New South Wales/Queensland border with Billinudgel to the north and South Golden Beach and New Brighton to the east of the town. Brisbane, the capital of Queensland, is closer than Sydney, the capital of New South Wales. The closest urban areas are Lismore and Tweed Heads.

== Transportation ==
Ocean Shores has a local bus service five times per day, linking the greater Ocean Shores community, Brunswick Heads, Mullumbimby, Byron Bay and Ballina. Ocean Shores is located between two airports, Ballina to the south, which has daily flights to Sydney and Melbourne, and Gold Coast to the north, which has daily services to most major Australian cities and a few international destinations. The closest closed railway station is at Mullumbimby, a 10-minute drive south. In the past, train service travelled down the North Coast line to Sydney, but the Murwillumbah line closed on 19 May 2004 and services now depart from Casino with NSW TrainLink operating road coaches.

== Community and history ==
Historical population
Year	Pop.	±%
1976	255	—
1981	1,018	+299.2%
1986	1,826	+79.4%
1991	2,797	+53.2%
1996	3,361	+20.2%
2001	3,450	+2.6%
2006	3,856	+11.8%
2011	4,032	+4.6%
2016	4,300	+6.6%
2021	4,818	+12.0%
Source: Australian Bureau of Statistics data.

The people of Ocean Shores live in a coastal and estuarine environment. The community consists of a mix of more recently migrated inhabitants from all over the world, as well as people who have lived in the district all of their lives. Members of the Midjimbul / Durumbil clans are the traditional custodians of the area. There are Aboriginal sites in the area, including middens along Marshalls Creek. The area is rich in indigenous heritage. The Brunswick, which included the Ocean Shores area, was the first place of European settlement in what is now called the Byron Shire, dating back to 1846.

The Ocean Shores Community Association (OSCA) and its predecessors, have worked for community issues in the Ocean Shores district, since the town was founded.

Mungo Wentworth MacCallum was a noted resident.

In March 2022, Ocean Shores was hit by floods which left many buildings destroyed.

== Local farmers' market ==
The Local New Brighton Farmer's Market opens every Tuesday morning from 8 am to 11 am.

== Arts and culture ==
The Ocean Shores Arts Expo is an annual art exhibition which features art in the following categories: Watercolour & Gouache, Mixed Media, Printmaking, Drawing & Pastels, Oil & Acrylic, Sculpture / 3D art, Photography and Digital Art. It began in 2004 when a group of residents who had come together during the Pacific Highway planning controversy decided to create something uplifting, creative and positive for the community. Lions of Brunswick/Mullumbimby financially supported the project as a worthy cultural event to bring community together. Local history has been an important cornerstone of the Expo every year with our local historian Frank Mills. The Art Expo has taken place over a weekend in August every year. Then over the weekend there are local musicians performing, art demonstrations, the Youth art show, a community artwork, and the Artists cafe.

== Business and local economy ==
The Ocean Shores and surrounding area established a business networking group in 2012, called Business Ashored, to promote and support trade and the local economy.

The Ocean Village Shopping Centre is a central meeting place for Ocean Shores residents.

The entrance to the rural hinterland of The Pocket and Main Arm is Billinudgel. Billinudgel village has a variety of retail shops including a general store, the historic Billinudgel Hotel, post office, hair dresser and many others.

== Sports and outdoor ==
The Ocean Shores Golf Course is an 18 hole course (No. 9 in NSW).

There are seven km of ocean surf beach, from the North Head of the Brunswick River to Wooyun creek. New Brighton Sports Oval and the new Ocean Shores Sportsfield, provides regular soccer practice and is the home of Shores United Soccer Club, involving junior and men's teams. There are two tennis courts, outdoor gym equipment and play equipment at Waterlily Park.
