= Ocean Shores =

Ocean Shores may refer to:

- Ocean Shores, New South Wales, Australia
- Ocean Shores, Washington, USA, founded circa 1962
- Ocean Shores, a residential development in Tiu Keng Leng in Hong Kong
- 'Ocean Shores', a fictional Southern California town designed by the Klasky-Csupo animation studio as a setting for the Rocket Power cartoon series
