= Brunswick River (New South Wales) =

Brunswick River Middle Arm of Brunswick River Main Arm of Brunswick River
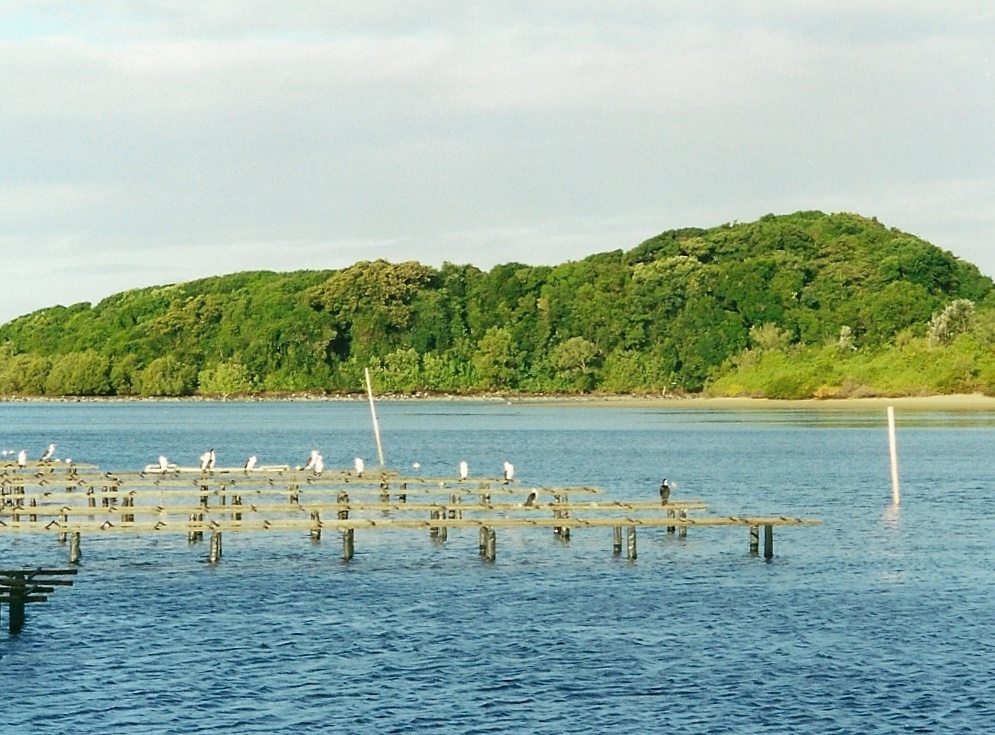
- Littoral rainforest & oyster farm at Brunswick Heads, Australia. The rainforest features a large Ficus macrophylla in the left centre

- Location of the Brunswick River mouth in New South Wales
- Etymology: In honour of Queen Caroline of Brunswick
- Native name: Durangbil (Bandjalang)

Location
- Country: Australia
- State: New South Wales
- IBRA: NSW North Coast
- District: Northern Rivers
- LGA: Byron

Physical characteristics
- Source: Mount Jerusalem
  - location: Palmwoods, near Uki
  - elevation: 141 m (463 ft)
- Mouth: Coral Sea, South Pacific Ocean
  - location: Brunswick Heads
  - coordinates: 28°32′15″S 153°33′30″E
  - elevation: 0 m (0 ft)
- Length: 34 km (21 mi)
- Basin size: 226.3 km^{2} (87.4 sq mi)

Basin features
- Tributaries
  - right: Mullumbimby Creek, Kings Creek (New South Wales), Simpsons Creek
- National park: Mount Jerusalem NP

Brunswick River (/ˈbrʌnzwɪk/ BRUN-zwik) is an open mature wave dominated barrier estuary, located in the Northern Rivers region of New South Wales, Australia.

It is on the lands of the Bundjalung people, its traditional owners, who knew it as 'Durangbil'.

== Course and features ==
Brunswick River rises on the eastern slopes of Mount Jerusalem, at Palmwoods, near Uki, and flows generally east southeast, before reaching its mouth at the Coral Sea of the South Pacific Ocean, at Brunswick Heads. The river descends 142 metres (466 ft) over its 34 kilometres (21 mi) course; through the towns of Mullumbimby and Brunswick Heads.

Brunswick River is impounded by a lake at Tyagarah, where the local tea trees give the lake water a brown tint. This lake becomes a popular swimming hole in the summer months and is used by naturists who come down from Tyagrah Beach. The naturist area is only about 15 kilometres (9.3 mi) north of Byron Bay.

The north arm of the river, called Marshalls Creek, flows through Ocean Shores, Billinudgel, Ocean Shores North and The Pocket. Marshalls Creek also connects to a canal in Ocean Shores North and South Golden Beach. The south arm of the river, called Simpsons Creek, flows through Brunswick Heads, Bayside and Tyagarah.

Between Brunswick Heads and Ocean Shores, the Pacific Highway crosses the river.

The northern bank at the mouth of the river is the northern extent of the Cape Byron Marine Park.

== See also ==
- List of rivers of Australia
