= Edwin Wilson (poet) =

Australian poet and painter (1942–2022)

Edwin James "Peter" Wilson (27 October 1942 – 27 July 2022) was an Australian poet, painter, and lapsed scientist, with a strong interest in history.

== Early life and education ==
Edwin Wilson was born on 27 October 1942 at Lismore, New South Wales.

He spent his early years in the then isolated farming community of East Wardell, in far northern coastal New South Wales, having been known as 'Peter' as a child, whose father died before he was born.

When his mother remarried Henry Forbes, cabinetmaker (in 1947), young 'Peter Wilson/Forbes' started school at Brunswick Heads. The 'boy poet' spent the formative decade (from 1948–1958) in Mullumbimby, prior to moving to Tweed Heads in 1959. At Mullumbimby he became a passionate orchid collector (from the surrounding rainforests).

Before attending Mullumbimby High School (at age 12) his mother told him that his name was Edwin and not Peter, and he would have to change for school banking, which was quite destabilising, an adjustment that was not properly made until he went to Murwillumbah High School (in 1959).

A scholarship to Armidale Teachers' College (1960–1961) provided his 'escape' from rural poverty, and was a period of aesthetic flowering. An appointment to The Forest High School, Frenchs Forest (1962) enabled him to complete a (part-time) science degree at the University of New South Wales (in Chemistry and Botany).

== Career ==
Occupations: Science teacher (1962–1965); lecturer Armidale Teachers' College (now defunct) (1968–1972); Education Officer, The Australian Museum, (1972–1980); Community Relations, Royal Botanic Gardens Sydney (1980–2002); Hon. Research Associate (Royal Botanic Gardens Sydney).

His first significant success in literary journals was with Poetry Australia (with a number of poems published over a range of years).

In 1975 he executed a literary hoax in opposition to quotas (in which he had a poem published under the female pseudonym of 'Eileen' in Kate Jennings' Mother I'm Rooted, an Anthology of Australian Women Poets).

In 1980 he moved to the Royal Botanic Gardens Sydney. In 1982 he set up Woodbine Press, a then subsidiary of Edwards & Shaw, with Dick Edwards (of Edwards & Shaw) as his silent partner. Banyan, his first book of poems, was printed by Edwards & Shaw in their last year of business.

Wilson retired from paid work in 2003, as a research associate of the Gardens, working with Phil Spence on a breeding program using high-altitude New Guinea Latouria-type orchid hybrids, to try to bring cold-tolerance (that is, grow at Sydney equivalent latitudes without a glasshouse) into bench quality plants. In 2014 Phil Spence registered the hybrid Dendrobium tapiniense x Dendrobium johsoniae with the Royal Horticultural Society (UK) under the Grex name of Dendrobium Edwin Wilson.

In 2003 he had started art classes at the Lavender Bay Gallery, and was elected as an Exhibiting Member of the Royal Art Society of New South Wales (in 2008), and won the Medal of Distinction at the 2010 RAS Spring Show, with a joint exhibition in 2011 (with Bruce Herps, at Artarmon Galleries, Sydney), and a Mullumbimby-themed exhibition at the Tweed River Gallery (Murwillumbah) in 2014.

After an article on the centenary of ‘Tidge’ Wilson’s birth in the local paper at Lismore, New South Wales, aged 61, he was discovered by his brother Jim, then retired, who had previously worked as a carpenter and builder, and died in 2008.

Wilson’s twentieth book, and tenth book of poetry, My Brother Jim (2009), was dedicated to Edwin James (Jim) Onslow/Wilson, 1939–2008. His New Collected Poems came out in 2012. Stardust Painter-Poet (2015) is a glossy art catalogue with paintings linked to some of his thematic poems and poem fragments.

== Personal life, death and legacy ==
Wilson married Margaret Dawn Macintyre in 1968. The child of that short-lived union, James Richmond Wilson, was killed in a road accident. His second, lasting, marriage was to Cheryl Lillian Turnham in 1975, with whom he had three children. He died on 27 July 2022.

Wilson's literary papers are held at the Mitchell Library at the State Library of New South Wales in Sydney.

He is included in the Who’s Who of Australian Writers, D.W. Thorpe; Thylazine database; The Oxford Companion to Australian Literature (2nd edition, 1994); Australian Poets and Their Works, by William Wilde, Joy Hooton and Barry Andrews (OUP, 1996); MUP Encyclopaedia of Australian Science Fiction & Fantasy (Melbourne University Press, 1998); Bibliography of Australian Literature P-Z, by, John Arnold and John Hay (University of Queensland Press, 2008).

In an episode first broadcast on 18 November 2020, he competed against three other contestants in Hard Quiz on ABC television and won.

== Publications ==
Wilson was the author of many books, including poetry, about poetry, prose, memoirs, and social history. He also had articles and poems published in numerous journals and magazines.

Notables publications include:

- The Wishing Tree and Poetry of Place, a social history of Royal Botanic Gardens Sydney
- Falling Up Into Verse, a book about poetry
- The Mullumbimby Kid
- New Collected Poems
- Stardust Painter-Poet
