= Trans-Border Institute =

Trans-Border Institute Logo.

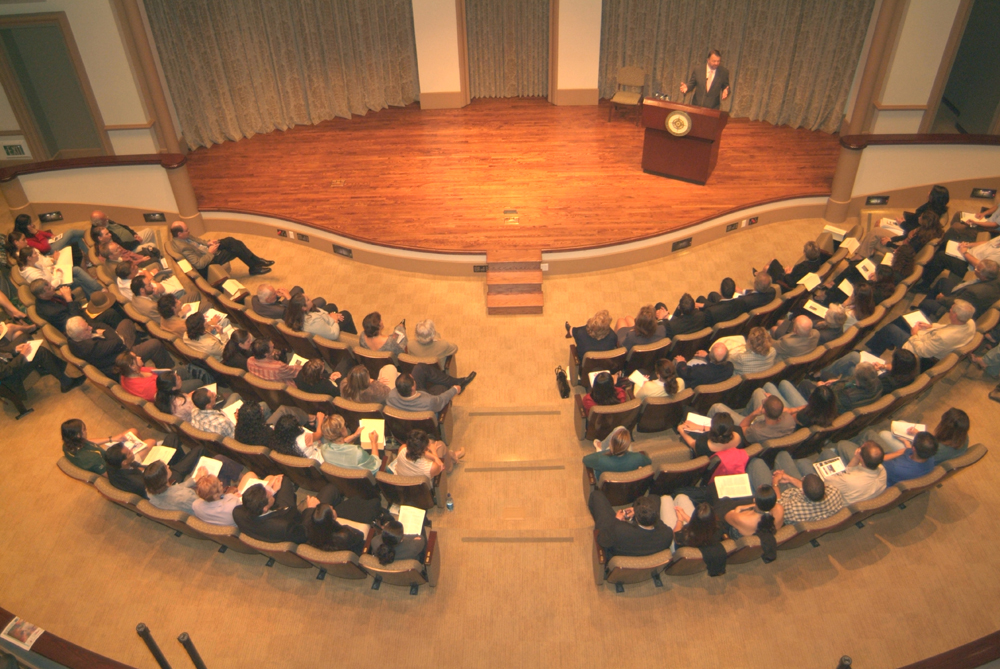
Trans-Border Migration and Development Conference.

The Trans-Border Institute (TBI) was founded in 1994 at the University of San Diego (USD) to promote scholarship, studies, research, and activities related to Mexico and the United States-Mexico border, and to encourage an active role for the University in the cross-border community. It is a part of the Joan B. Kroc School of Peace Studies.

TBI promotes sustainable peace in Mexico and the border region, through applied research, innovative pedagogy, and cross-border partnerships. For twenty years, TBI has been a leading source of information and outreach on pressing border issues and the broader relationship between Mexico and the United States. TBI has published widely cited survey data and reports on police reform, arms trafficking, and immigration enforcement.

== Activities and projects ==
TBI has a number of research, teaching, and peacebuilding programs both in the border region and beyond:

- TBI's Peacebuilding seminars offer interactive educational and capacity building programs in the areas of Mexico hardest hit by the drug war and the dislocations of the border. Our seminars and certificate programs are designed to cultivate the next generation of peacebuilders in Mexico and the border region by leveraging existing institutional strengths against the most pressing peace and justice issues.
- The Freedom of Expression Project translates and distributes the work of at-risk journalists to an international audience so that everyone gains a clearer picture of a region in crisis. The project also issues periodic findings on violence against reporters and media censorship, interviewing journalists directly about their experiences when they're able to speak out.
- Since 2007, TBI has hosted Border Film Week, an annual documentary film festival. Border Film Week gives students, educators, and the greater community an up close look at the people and culture of the Americas, adding diverse voices and faces to our conventional research methods.
- TBI's Trans-Border Opportunities summer certificate program is a new academic offering designed to help working professionals, students and aspiring civic leaders in San Diego gain the knowledge and tools they need to engage with the border region. Tapping TBI's network and expertise, the certificate not only gives participants hard facts and reliable data about the border, but also allows them to interact with leading regional policymakers, stakeholders, and experts who provide firsthand testimony about those opportunities.

Each year TBI also sponsors conferences, speakers and other events to bring attention to key border issues and US-Mexico relations.

== History ==
The Trans-Border Institute was founded in fall 1994. David Shirk was director of the Institute until 2013. He was succeeded by Everard Meade.
