= New Brighton, New South Wales =

Town in New South Wales, Australia

Coordinates: 28°31′S 153°33′E

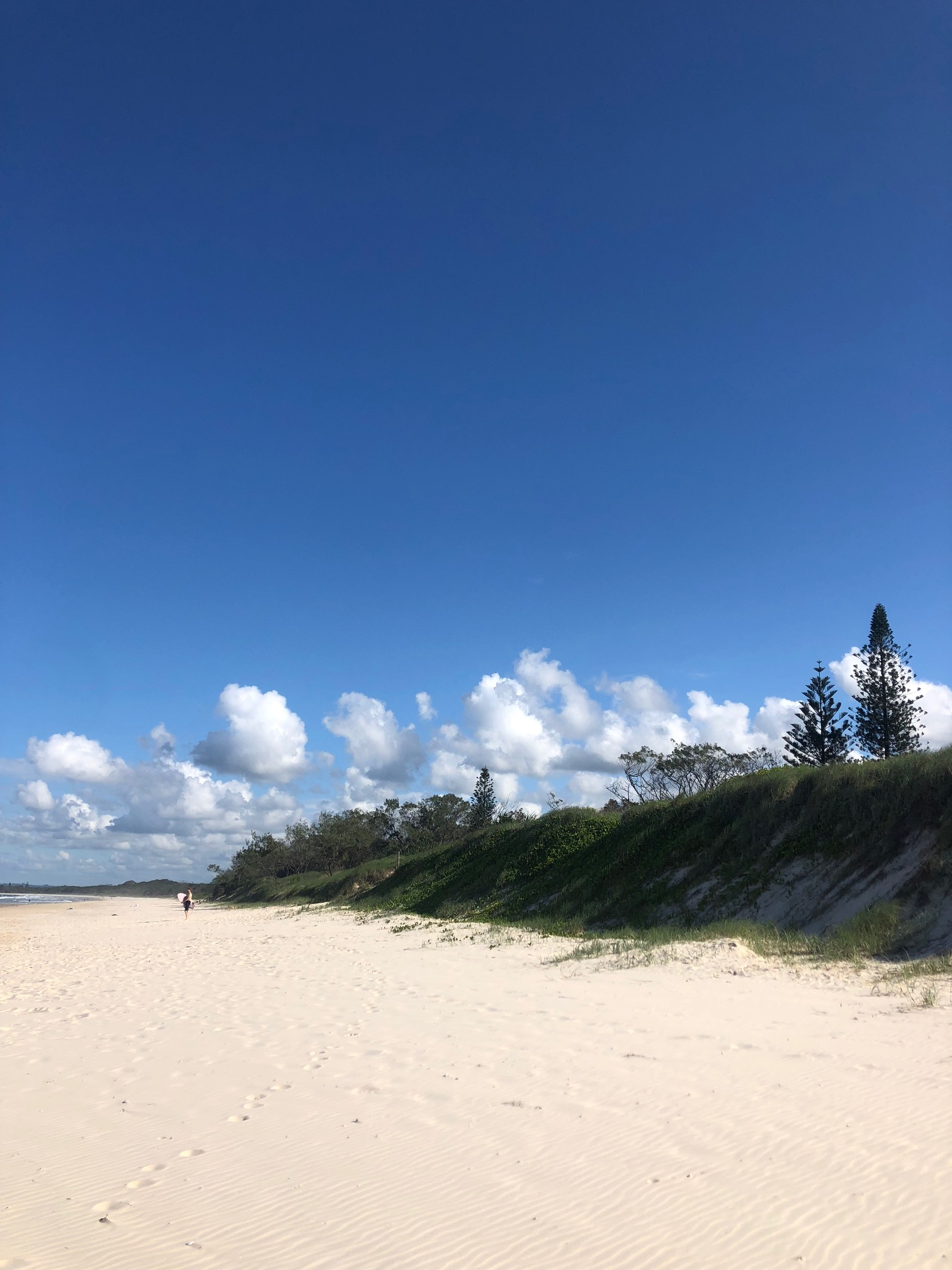
New Brighton Beach, New South Wales

New Brighton is a small town located north-west of Ocean Shores in the Northern Rivers region of New South Wales, Australia. It sits within the Byron Shire Local Government area.

It is on the lands of the Minjungbal people of the Bundjalung Nation who are its Traditional Owners.

At the 2021 census New Brighton had a population of 368 people.

== History ==
New Brighton was first settled by Europeans in the 1860s and it was a cedar-getters' camp for people involved in the local forestry industry who would collect logs that were floated there through the Marshall's and Wilson's Creek.

1881 also saw a large increase of Bundjalung people living there who had been forced of their land due to the forestry industry and increased farming of the region but they were moved from here too by the 1890s likely due to works on the Murwillumbah railway line.

== Origin of place name ==
The name New Brighton first began being used in 1902 and, during a 1906 land sale, it was advertised as 'the Brighton of the north' which was comparing in the Brighton, a seaside resort in England. Similarly in 1908 it was advertised as 'the most delightful seaside resort in the Commonwealth'.

The name was officially assigned in 1971.
