= CDC Canberra =

Australian bus operator

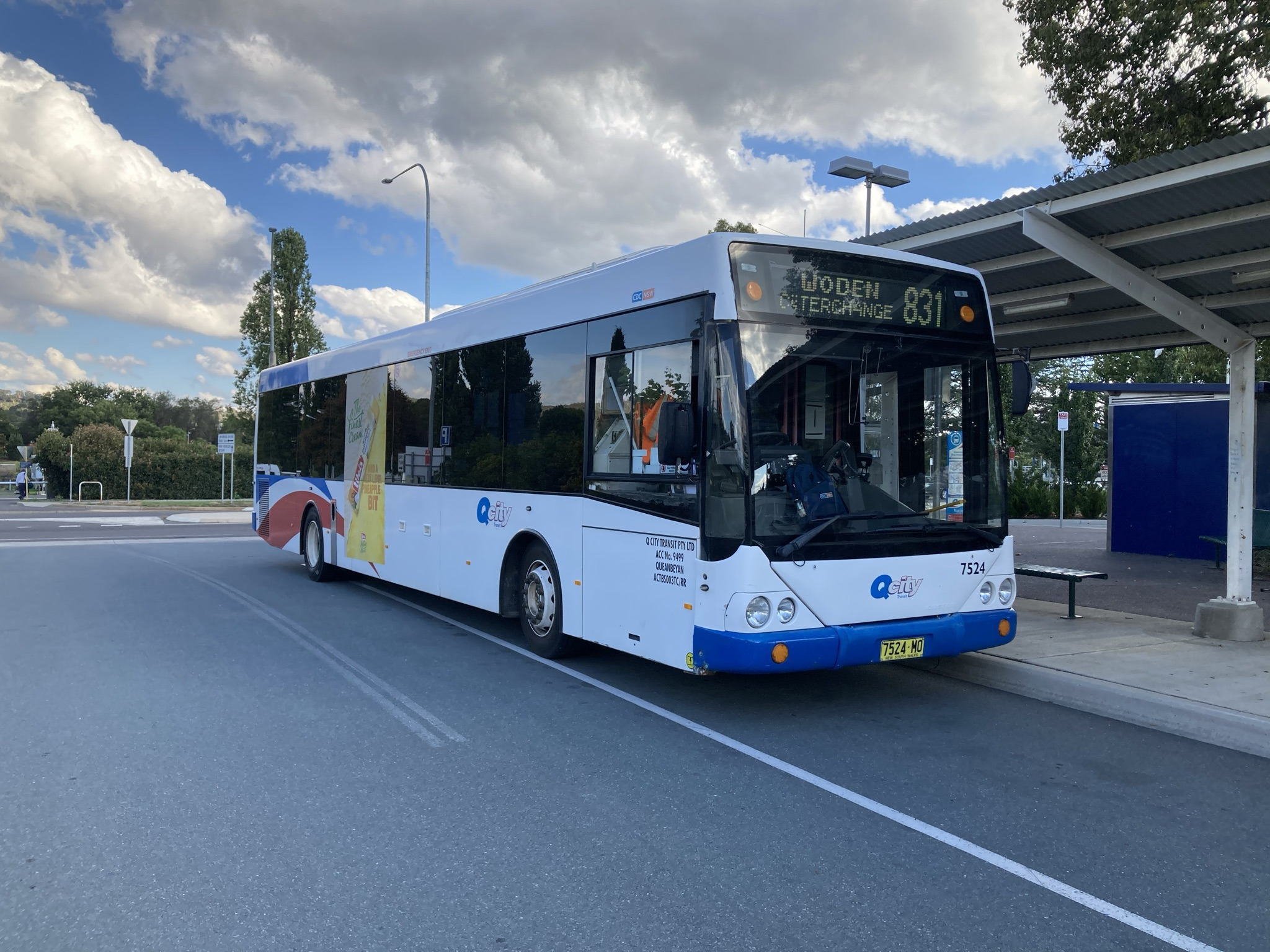
- Australian Bus Manufacturing bodied Irisbus Agoraline at Queanbeyan in February 2021
- Formerly: Qcity Transit; Deane's Buslines
- Parent: ComfortDelGro Australia
- Founded: July 1990
- Headquarters: Queanbeyan
- Service area: Queanbeyan; Canberra; Bungendore; Yass
- Depots: 2
- Fleet: 155 (February 2026)
- Website: cdccanberra.com.au

CDC Canberra, formerly Qcity Transit, is an Australian bus operator based in Queanbeyan, New South Wales. It operates services from Queanbeyan to Canberra, Bungendore and Yass. It is a subsidiary of ComfortDelGro Australia.

== History ==
Former Qcity Transit logo

In October 1977, Doug Lever purchased Quodling Brothers's Queanbeyan to Canberra service that it had operated since 1935. In July 1990 Lever Coachlines route bus operations were sold to Dennis Deane trading as Queanbeyan – Canberra Bus Service. Deane was already established in Canberra having purchased the Canberra and Snowy Mountains business of Pioneer Trailways in April 1989 with 17 coaches.

In March 1992, the Sydney to Snowy Mountains service was sold to Australian Coachlines and the Cooma based school runs to Snowliner Coaches with Queanbeyan – Canberra Bus Service rebranded as Deane's Buslines. Deane was the son of Ron Deane who operated Clipper Tours, Deanes Coaches and South Trans in Sydney. Over the next few years, Deane would purchase most of the school bus operations in the surrounding area including those of Lever Coachlines in 1994, Federal Highway Bus Co in July 1995 and Murrays in November 1997.

In December 2001, Edwards Bus Service, Eden and Merimbula was purchased and became Deane's Buslines South Coast. In 2005, this business was passed over to Deane's daughter and son-in-law Jamie and Anton Klemm. It continued to operate under the Deane's Buslines name until February 2013, when it was renamed Sapphire Coast Buslines.

In July 2008, Transborder Express, which operated Yass to Canberra services as well as charter and school services, was purchased from Max Williams, to form Deane's Transit Group. The Transborder business was gradually combined with Deane's Buslines including the closure of Transborder's depot in Mitchell, ACT with all vehicles transferred to Deane's depot in Queanbeyan.

In September 2012, Deane's Transit Group was sold to ComfortDelGro Cabcharge. In July 2013, the Queanbeyan services of Deane's Buslines were rebranded as Qcity Transit with the Transborder Express name reinstated for the Yass to Canberra services. On 23 January 2023, both Qcity Transit and Transborder Express were rebranded CDC Canberra.

== Fleet ==
As at February 2026, the fleet consists of 155 vehicles.

== Boarding Passes ==
Qcity Transit would issue a smart card for use on its buses and Transborder Express buses. These were updated to concession fare cards, which could be provided through NSW government agencies, the ACT government, and the Commonwealth government through Centrelink, and school travel passes, which were also implemented as a separate service. Cash is still accepted as a valid fare.
