= Transborder Express =

Australian bus company

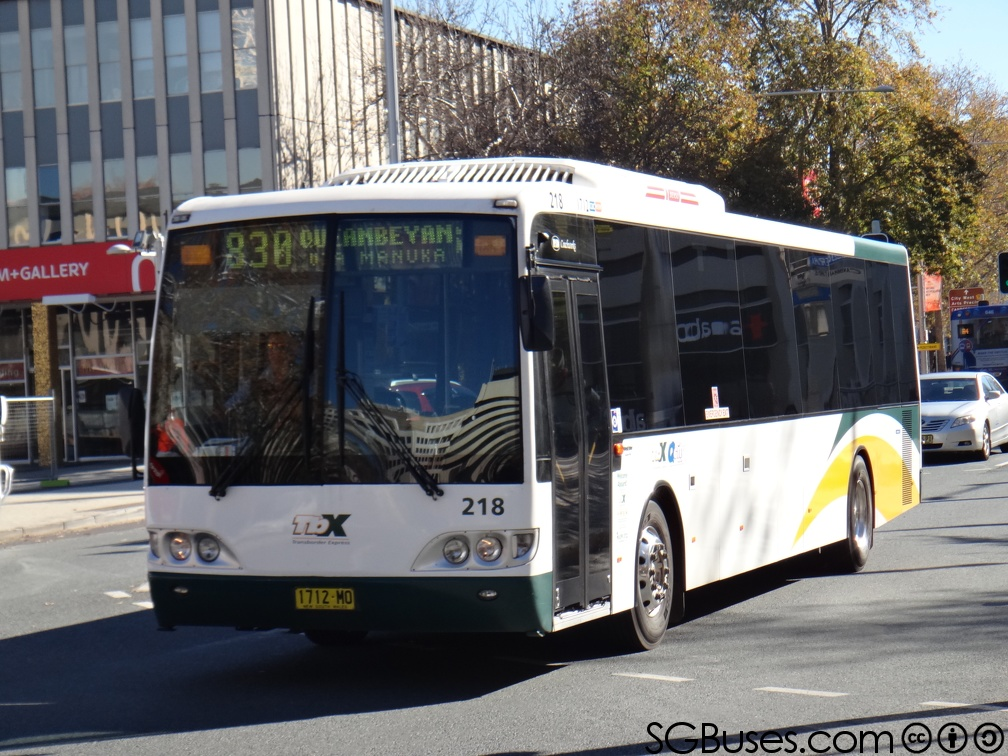
- P&D Coachworks bodied Volvo B7RLE in Canberra
- Parent: ComfortDelGro Australia
- Founded: July 1954
- Defunct: January 2023
- Headquarters: Queanbeyan
- Service area: South Eastern New South Wales; Australian Capital Territory
- Alliance: Qcity Transit
- Fleet: 16 (December 2013)
- Website: www.transborder.com.au

Transborder Express was an Australian bus and coach company based in Yass that operated from 1954 until 2023. It was a subsidiary of ComfortDelGro Australia from 2012, who merged the company into CDC Canberra in 2023.

== History ==
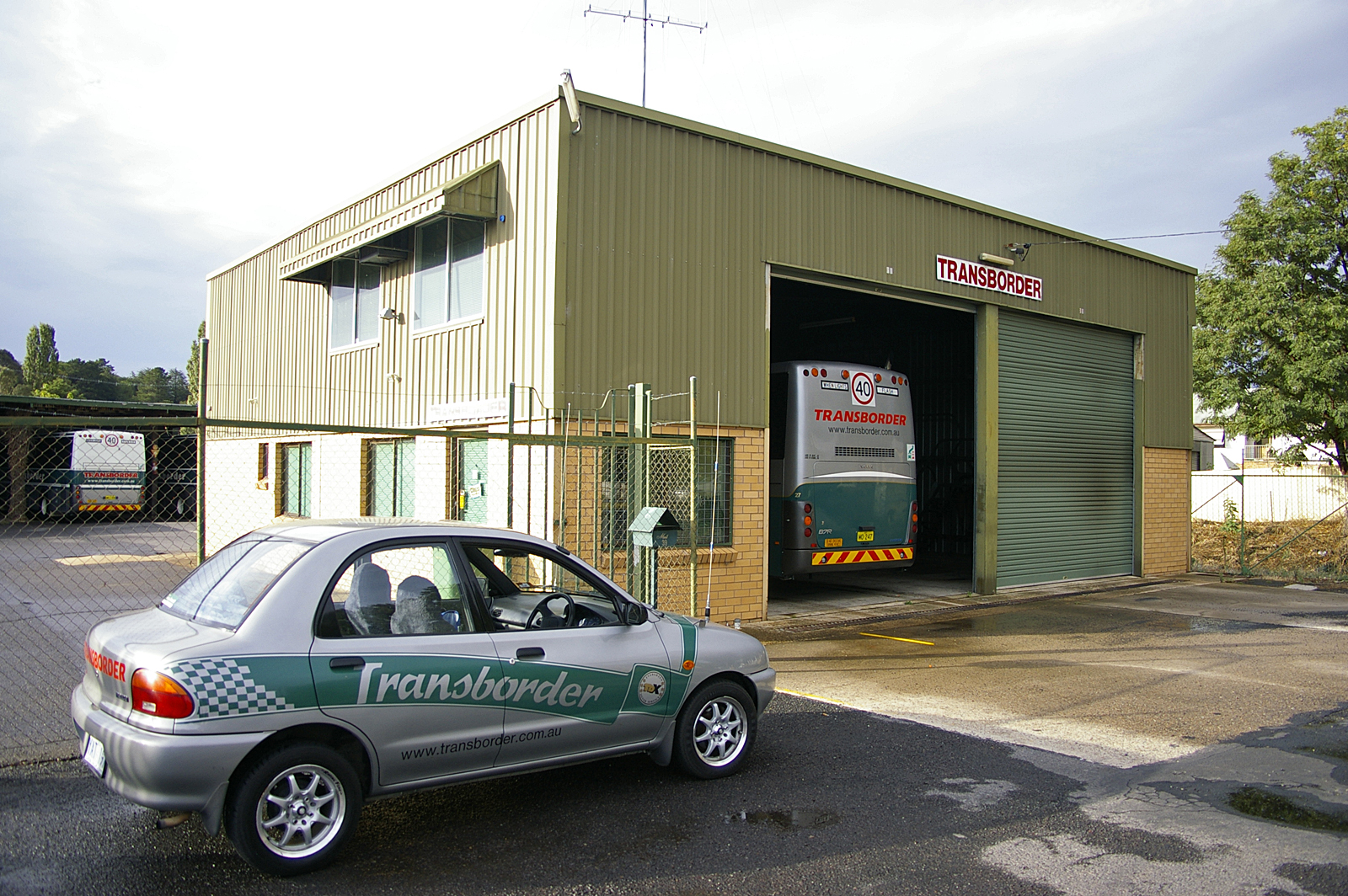
Transborder depot at Yass

Transborder Express was established in July 1954 by Jack Williams operating a mail service from Yass to Canberra connecting with the South Mail at Yass Junction railway station with limited passenger capacity as far as Yass. In 1959, a passenger service between Yass Junction and Canberra commenced connecting with the Intercapital Daylight. Trading as Yass Canberra Coaches, it was renamed Transborder Express in 1983.

In May 1999, Transborder Express purchased the coach operations of Lever Coachlines with four coaches. In July 2008, Transborder Express was sold to Deane's Transit Group but retained its own identity.

In September 2012, ComfortDelGro Cabcharge acquired Deane's Transit Group which included Transborder Express.

In January 2023, the Transborder Express was retired with both it and Qcity Transit rebranded CDC Canberra.

== Services ==
Transborder Express operated services under contract to CountryLink and its successor NSW TrainLink. From 1997 until 2008, it operated services from Canberra to Cootamundra. In 2002, it commenced operating services from Cootamundra to Tumbarumba, Canberra to Bombala and Canberra to Eden.

In March 2004, Transborder commenced operating a Jolimont Centre to Goulburn service after CountryLink withdrew a Canberra to Sydney service. It connected with CityRail services to and from Sydney at Goulburn. It ceased after CountryLink reinstated its service in May 2004.

Until 2007, services were operated to the New South Wales snowfields and until March 2009, summer services were operated from Canberra to Ulladulla.

Commuter services were between Yass and Canberra. School bus services were operated under contract to the NSW and ACT governments. These brought students from the various rural communities on the western side of Canberra, including Hall, Wallaroo, Murrumbateman and Yass.

== Fleet ==
As of December 2013, 14 vehicles carried Transborder Express livery with two in NSW TrainLink livery.
