= Billinudgel, New South Wales =

Town in New South Wales, Australia

Billinudgel
- Town
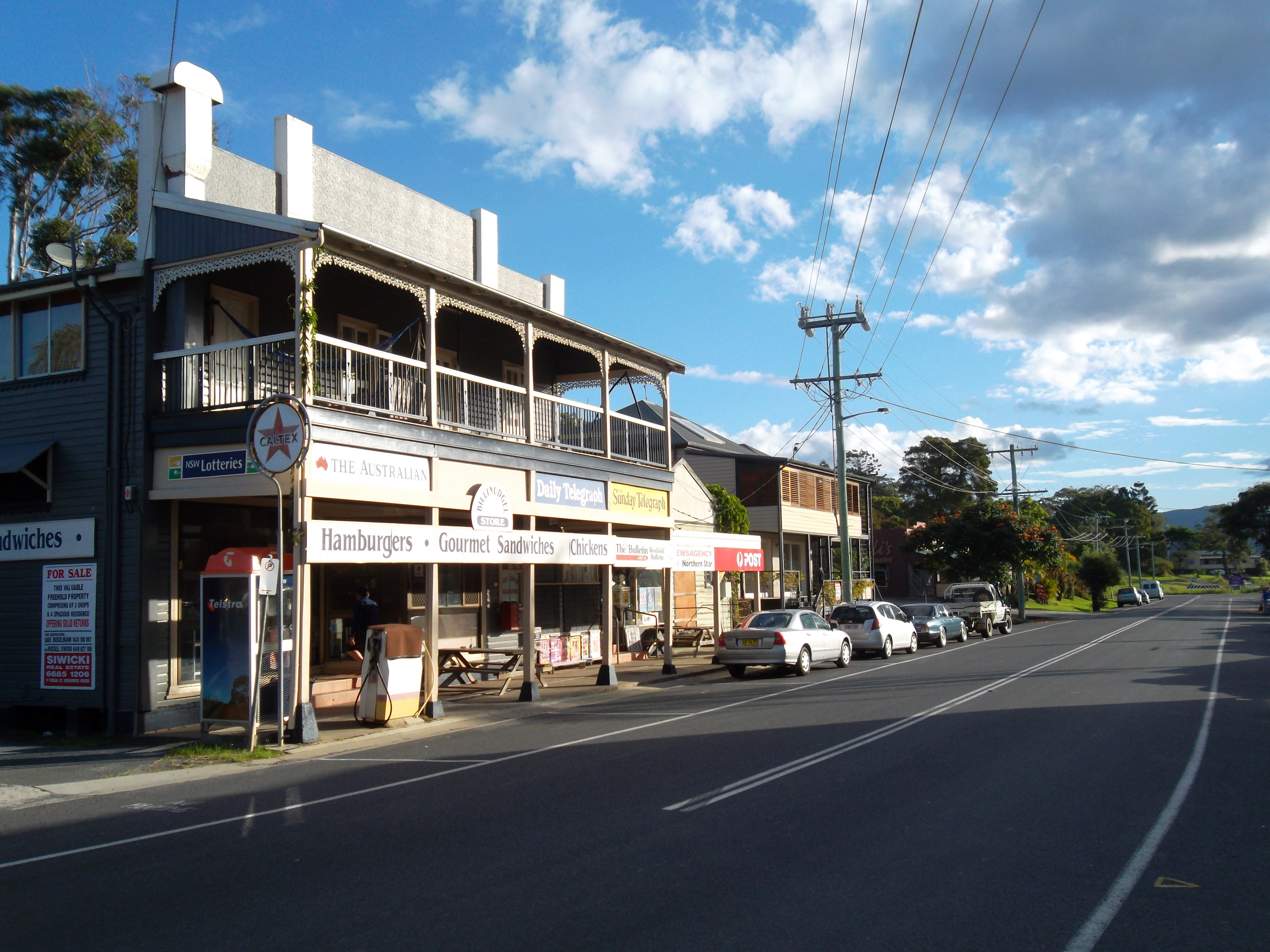
- Shops in Wilfred Street—Billinudgel's main street

- Coordinates: 28°30′S 153°32′E
- Country: Australia
- State: New South Wales
- LGA: Byron Shire Council
- Location: 780 km (480 mi) from Sydney; 147 km (91 mi) from Brisbane; 23 km (14 mi) from Byron Bay

Government
  - State electorate: Ballina
  - Federal division: Richmond

Area
  - Total: 8.657 km^{2} (3.342 sq mi)
- Elevation: 2 m (6.6 ft)

Population
  - Total: 261 (2021 census)
  - Density: 30.15/km^{2} (78.09/sq mi)
- Postcode: 2483
- Mean max temp: 23.7 °C (74.7 °F)
- Mean min temp: 16.5 °C (61.7 °F)
- Annual rainfall: 1,723.5 mm (67.85 in)

Billinudgel is a town in the Northern Rivers region of New South Wales, Australia, and is part of Byron Shire. The Murwillumbah railway line once passed through the town and a railway station was opened there in 1894.

The area was bypassed by a heavily upgraded Pacific Highway in July 2007, home to the NSW RFS Billinudgel/Ocean Shores Brigade from 1976.

The traditional owners of this land are the Minjungbal people of the Bundjalung nation.

== Place name ==
It is commonly accepted that name Billinudgel is derived from Bundjalung language word Bilihnadhihl, meaning "once belonged to a parrot" or "place of the king parrot". A less commonly thought origin, published in 1963, is that it means "the middle ground between a sea and a lake".

During the period of early European settlement it was also known as Grahamtown and then later changed to Hainsville in 1891. Despite this the name Billinudgel has been used as early as 1876 although it was often referred to as Billy Nudgel or Billy Mooghill; and spelling variations carried on for many years until formally gazetted in 1919.

== History ==
European settlement began in Billinudgel in the 1840s and consisted mainly of "cedar-getters" that harvested and milled cedar trees which were then rafted down the Brunswick River to Brunswick Heads where they were then shipped to Sydney.

Construction of the Murwillumbah railway line began is 1884 and, due to the influx of workers on the railway line, the population of the area increased and this prompted the construction of the towns first hotel, The Tramway Hotel which was constructed in 1892. This hotel would later burn down in 1898 and, after reconstruction, again in September 1906. In 1914 the hotel would be renamed as The New Brighton Hotel and in 1995 The Billinudgel Hotel.

The Billinudgel Public School was also opened there in 1893 and it closed in 1993.

Work in the Billinudgel area of the railway was completed in December 1894 when the Billinudgel railway station was completed which led to a rapid decline in population in the immediate aftermath. Despite this the introduction of the railway line did lead to increased employment opportunities and the variety of work available as goods could easily be transported from the area and many local farmers began dairy farming and, from the 1920s, banana farming.

The Billinudgel railway station closed on 11 November 1980 as demand decreased.

== Gallery ==
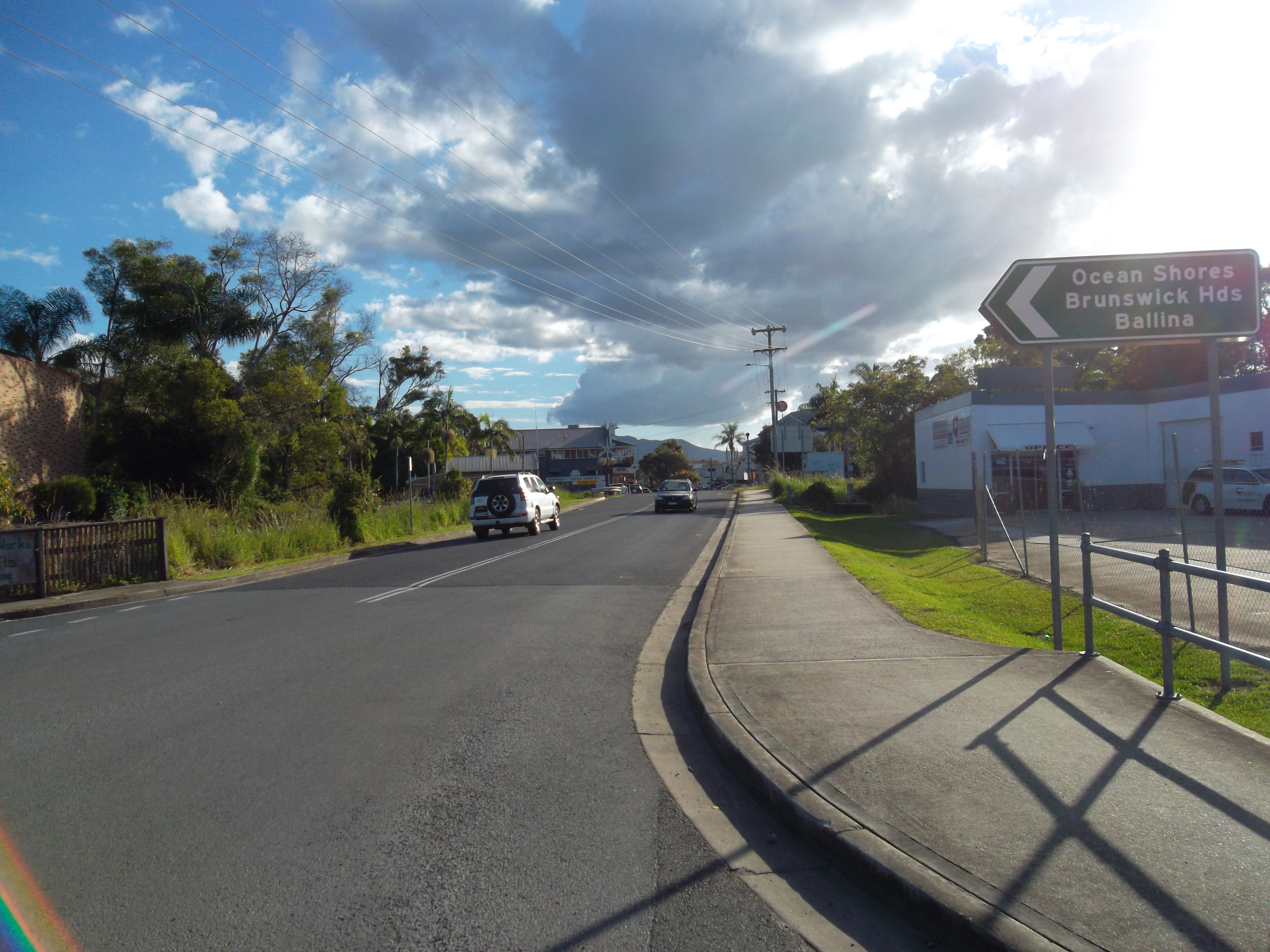
Wilfred Street, approaching the town Centre

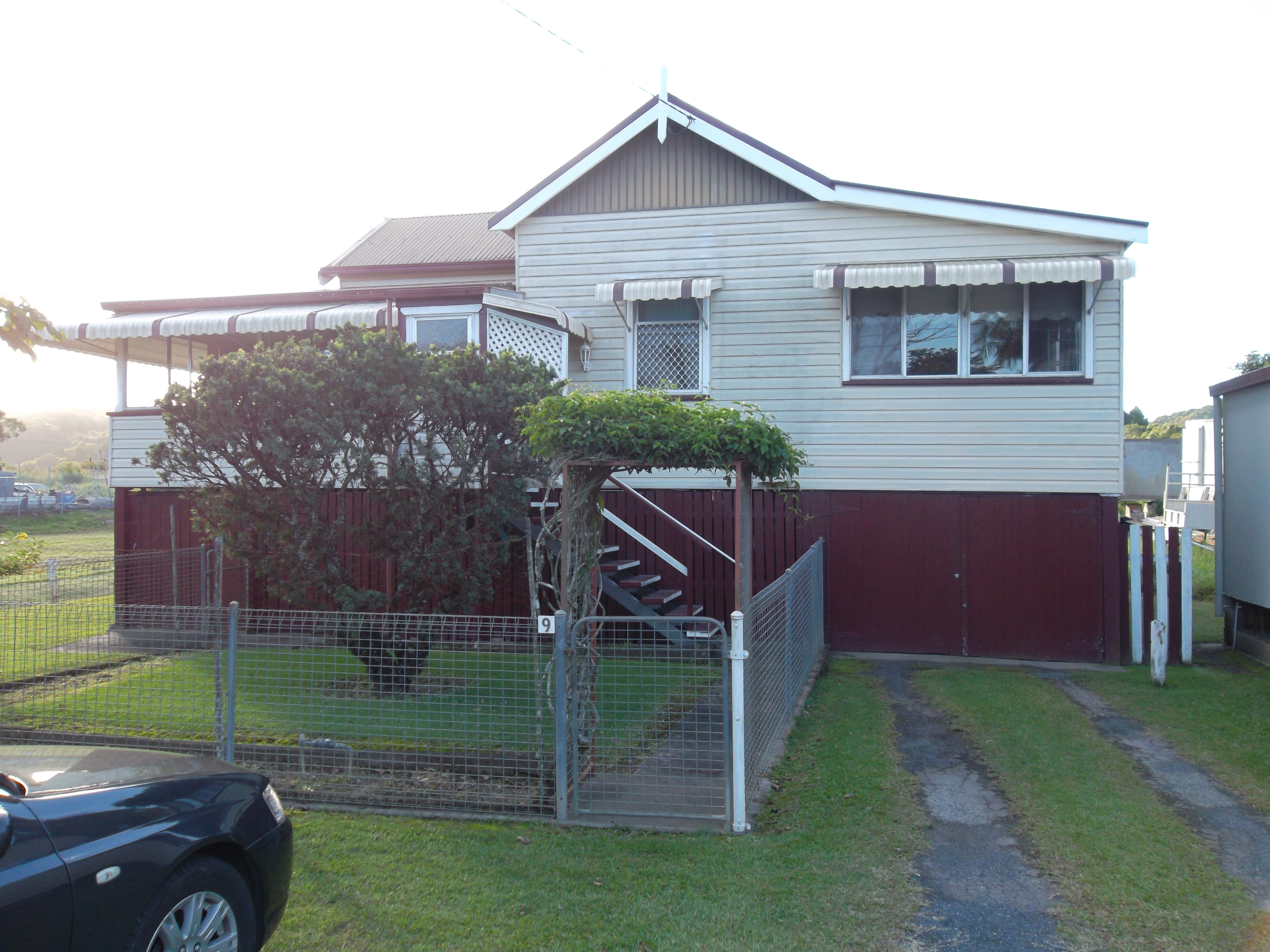
A private residence in Wilfred Street, that once housed the fire appliances before the Station was built.

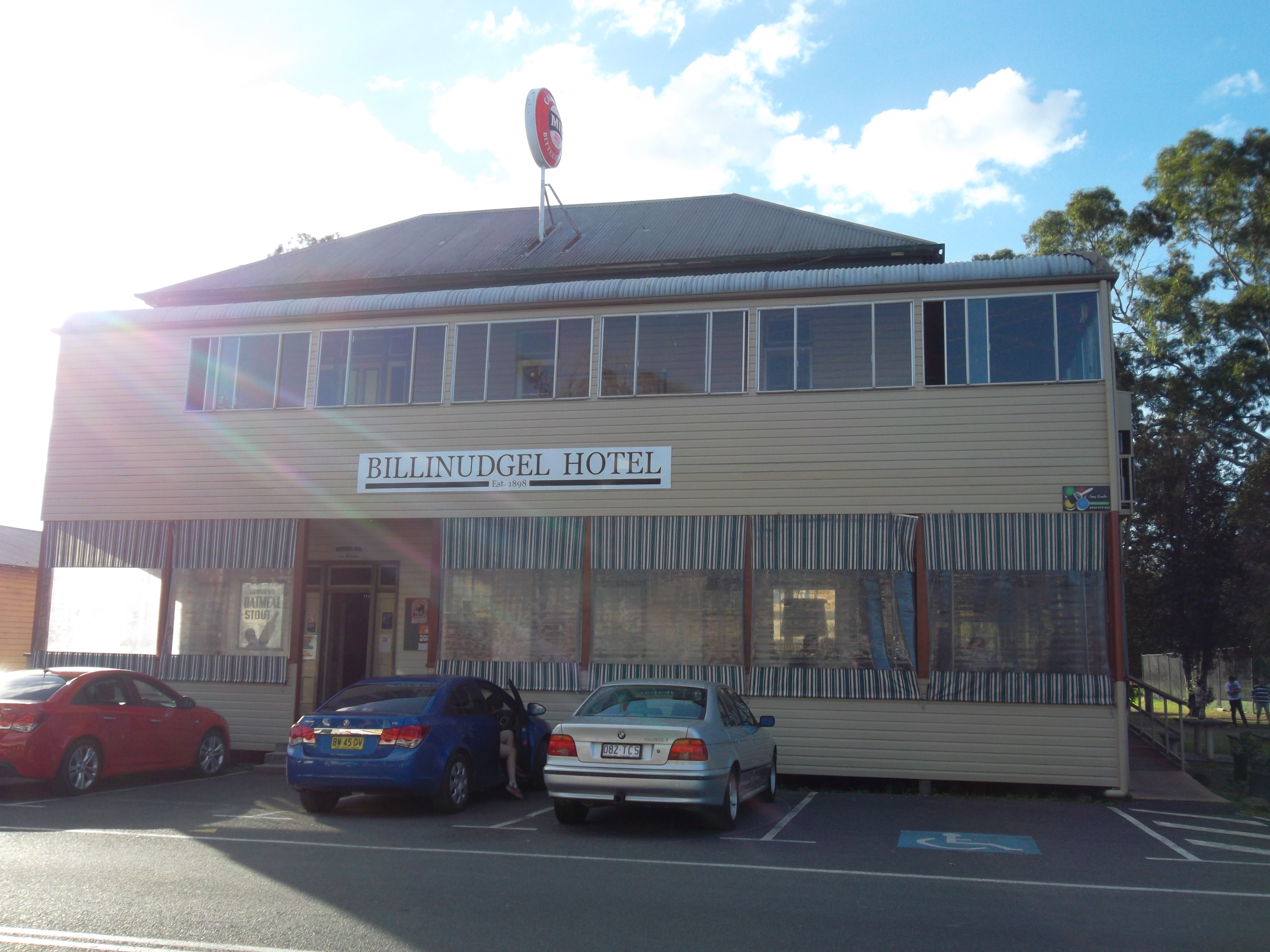
Billinudgel Hotel
