= Brunswick Heads =

Town in New South Wales, Australia

- Town
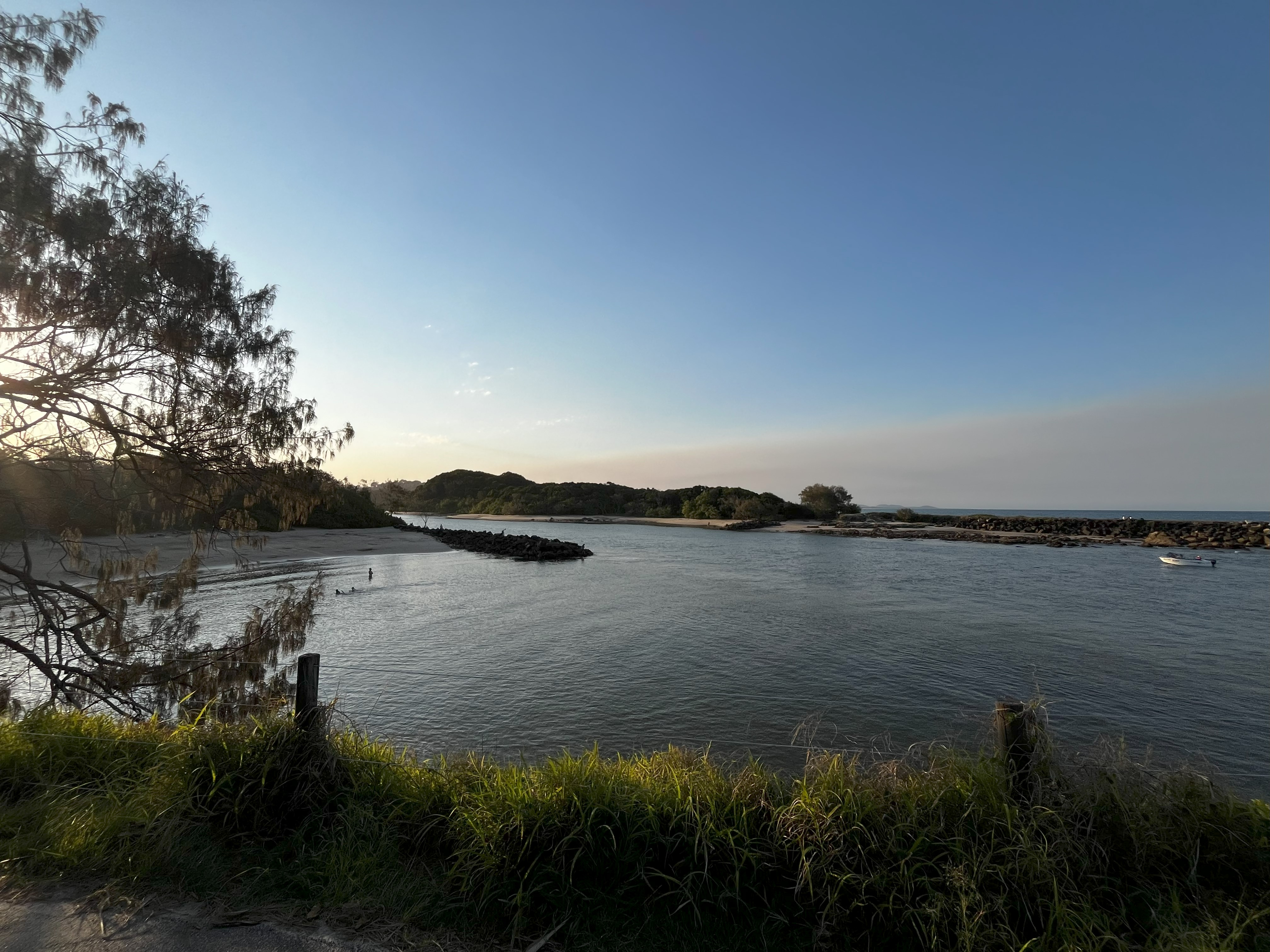
- A view of Brunswick Heads, September 2024

- Coordinates: 28°32′0″S 153°33′0″E
- Country: Australia
- State: New South Wales
- LGA: Byron Shire
- Location: 795 km (494 mi) NE of Sydney; 148 km (92 mi) SE of Brisbane; 18 km (11 mi) N of Byron Bay

Government
  - State electorate: Ballina
  - Federal division: Richmond

Population
  - Total: 1,686 (2021 census)
- Postcode: 2483

Brunswick Heads is a small town on the north coast of New South Wales, Australia in Byron Shire and it is 17 kilometres (11 mi) from the regional centre of Byron Bay.

It is located on the traditional lands of the Bundjalung Nation and, specifically, the Arakwal people although it also includes parts of the Minjungbal and Widjabal territories.

At the 2021 census, the town had a population of 1,686 people.

== History ==
Originally inhabited by people of the Bundjalung nation, the Brunswick River was charted by Captain Henry Rous in 1828. His visit was followed more than 20 years later by cedar cutters, whose activities led to the creation of the first town in what is now Byron Shire. By the 1880s, Brunswick Heads was a busy port with a small commercial centre.

The town was initially proclaimed as the village of Brunswick on 20 March 1885 but the name Brunswick Heads became more commonly used and was officially changed in the NSW Government Gazette on 2 July 1971. The Brunswick part of the name comes from its closeness to the Brunswick River, which was named for Caroline of Brunswick.

Poet and painter Edwin Wilson (1942–2022) started school at Brunswick Heads, as recorded in his 2000 autobiography The Mullumbimby Kid.

Historical population
Year	Pop.	±%
1966	1,069	—
1971	1,210	+13.2%
1976	1,402	+15.9%
1981	1,877	+33.9%
1986	1,585	−15.6%
1991	1,662	+4.9%
1996	1,835	+10.4%
2001	1,861	+1.4%
2006	1,614	−13.3%
2011	1,450	−10.2%
2016	1,559	+7.5%
2021	1,686	+8.1%
Source: Australian Bureau of Statistics data.

== Geography ==
Brunswick Heads is a small coastal holiday village situated at the mouth of the Brunswick River. Torakina Beach is located within the breakwater, while a white sandy surf beach stretches to the south. The north bank of the river is the home to a protected rainforest and the southern bank provides a harbour and small marina for fishing boats and small craft.

Despite the surrounding coastal development, Brunswick Heads has retained its traditional seaside village atmosphere. Timber bridges link the riverside to the river and surf beaches.

Brunswick Heads has a 30-minute travelling time from both Gold Coast Airport and the Ballina-Byron Gateway Airport, and it is 40 kilometres (25 mi) south of the Queensland border. The Pacific Highway bypassed Brunswick Heads in 1998.

== Arts and culture ==
The Brunswick Picture House venue, which operates out of an old cinema, opened in its current form in March 2016. It hosts entertainment events including film, circus, cabaret, comedy and live music events.

The Brunswick Heads Library operates out of a former church.

== Economy ==
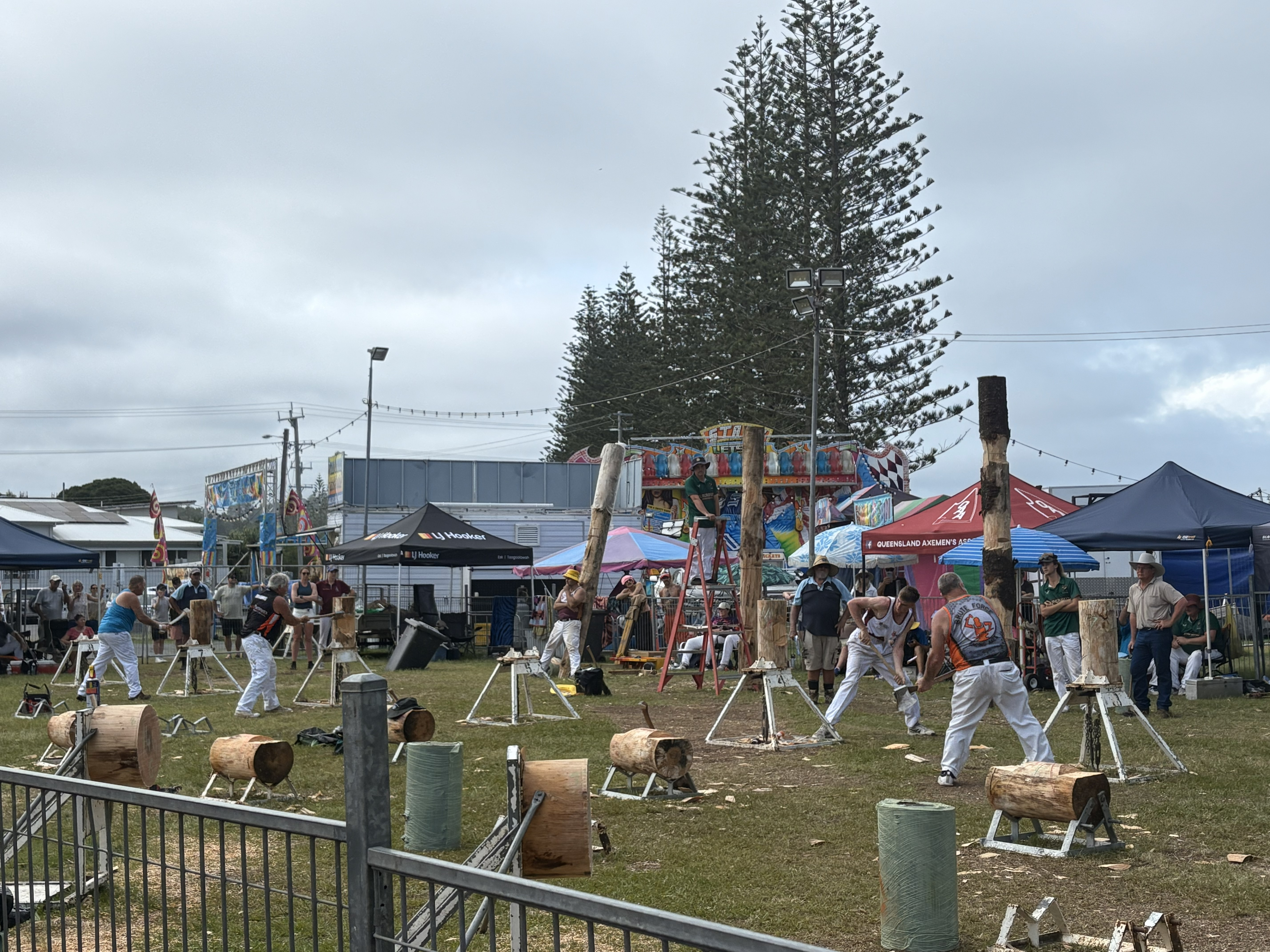
Brunswick Heads Woodchop, January 2026

Brunswick Heads has a number of cafes, restaurants, accommodation and specialty shops. It also offers a range of leisure activities all year round, and hosts a number of small-scale community and family-oriented festivals and events.

The annual 'Brunswick Heads Woodchop', held in January, is one of the largest woodchopping events in Australia. It has been running since 1928 with the original aim being to raise money for the footbridge from Brunswick Heads village to the surf. The footbridge officially opened on 31 January 1937 with the aim of improving tourism.

== In popular culture ==
- The town was the location for the cult 1980s comedy series Brunswick Heads Revisited (a send-up of Waugh's Brideshead Revisited), broadcast across Australia by the ABC.
- The fourth series of the ABC TV drama series, SeaChange, was filmed there in 2019.

== Gallery ==
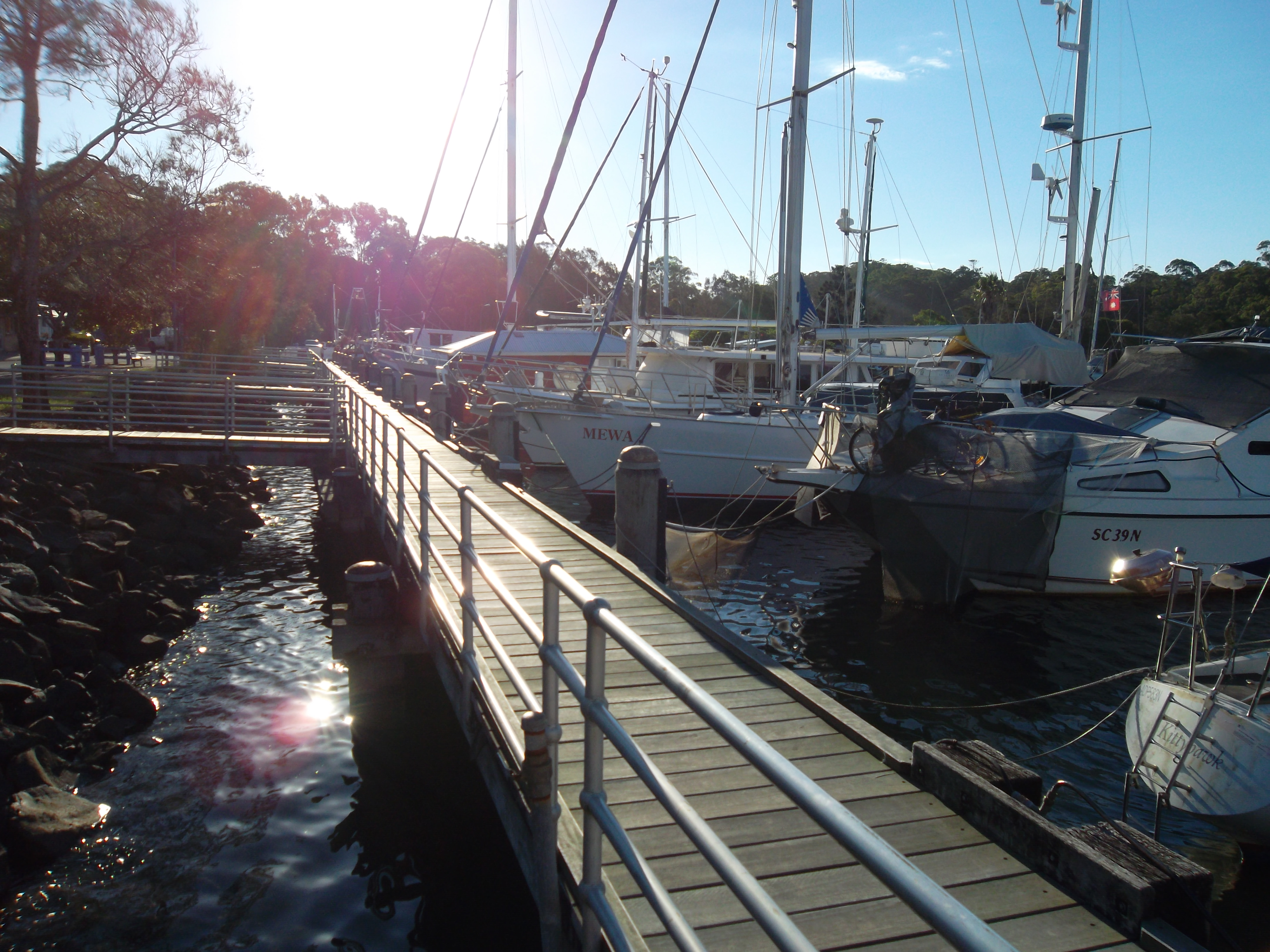
The jetty at Brunswick Heads Boat Harbour, 2014

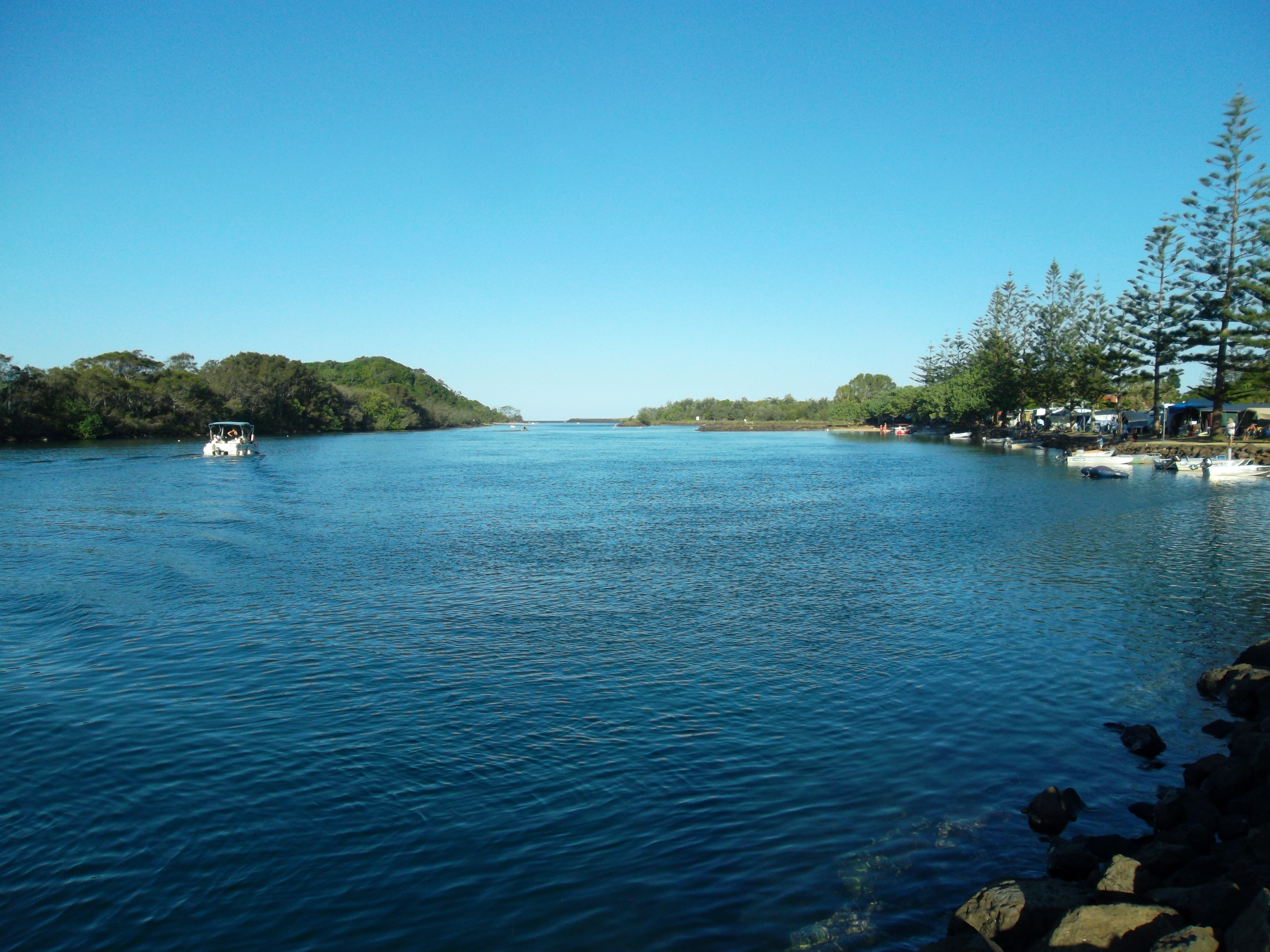
Brunswick River facing east (toward the sea), 2014

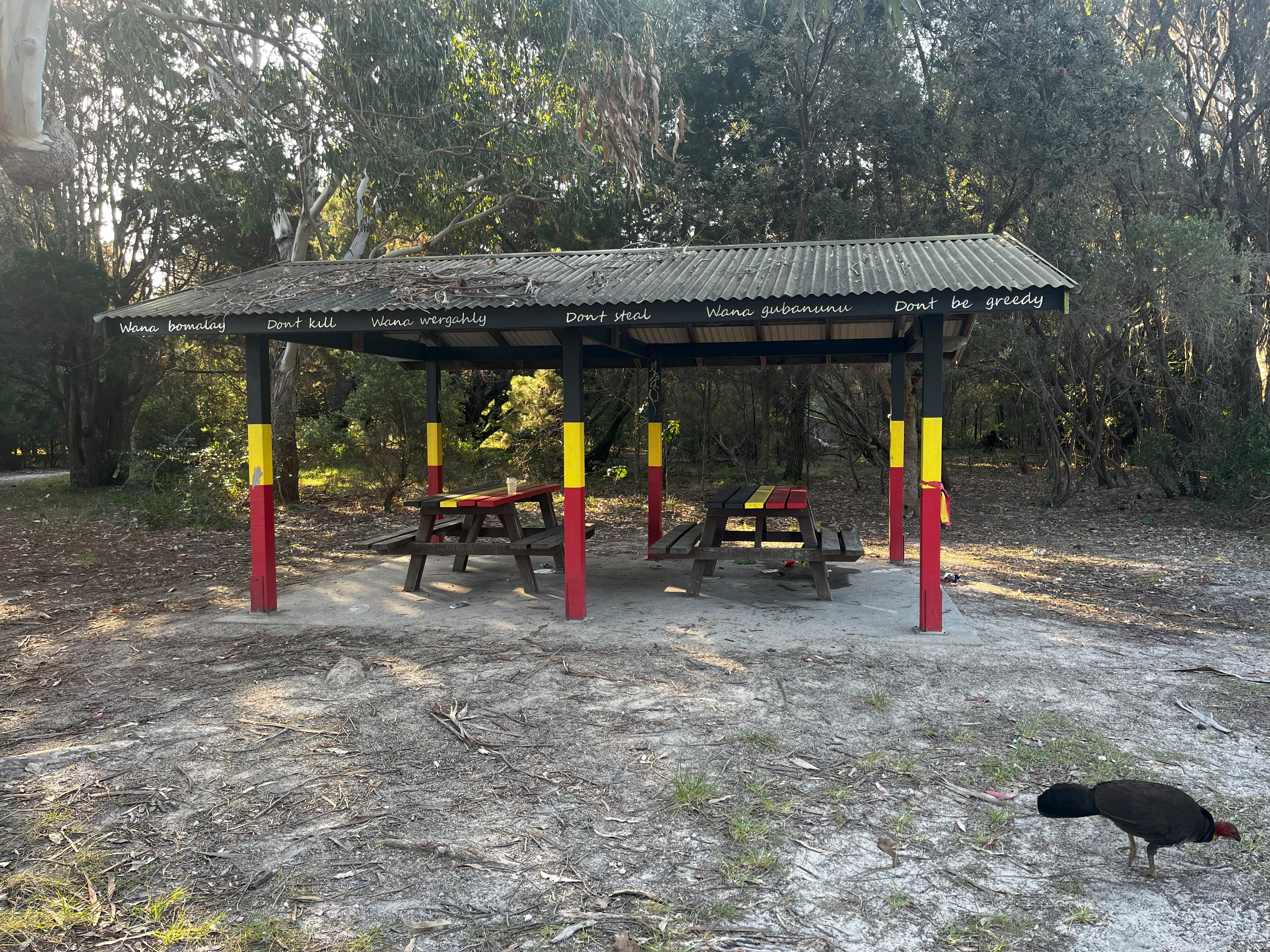
Picnic area near beach featuring Bundjalung words, 2024

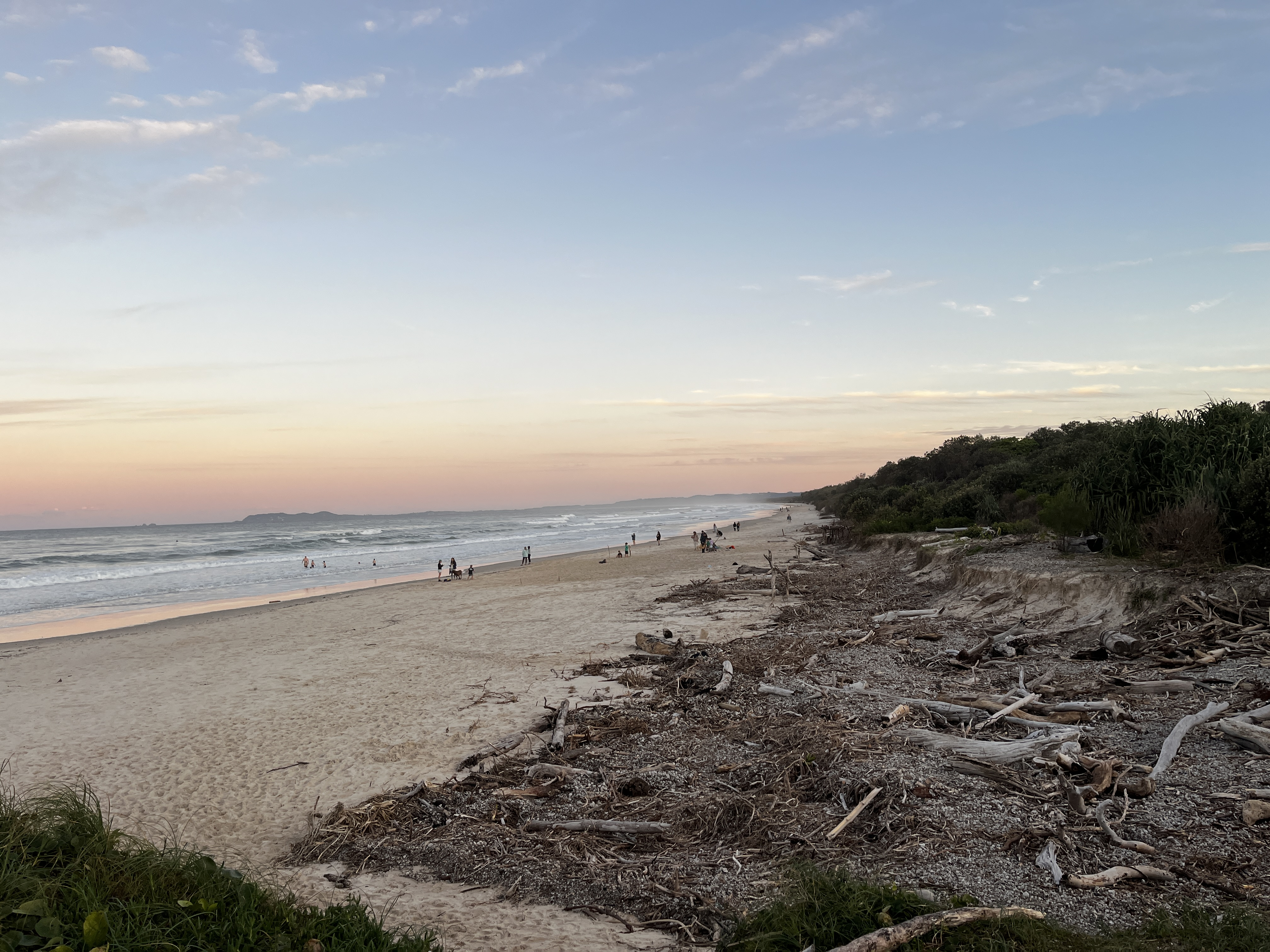
Brunswick Heads Main Beach, 2025

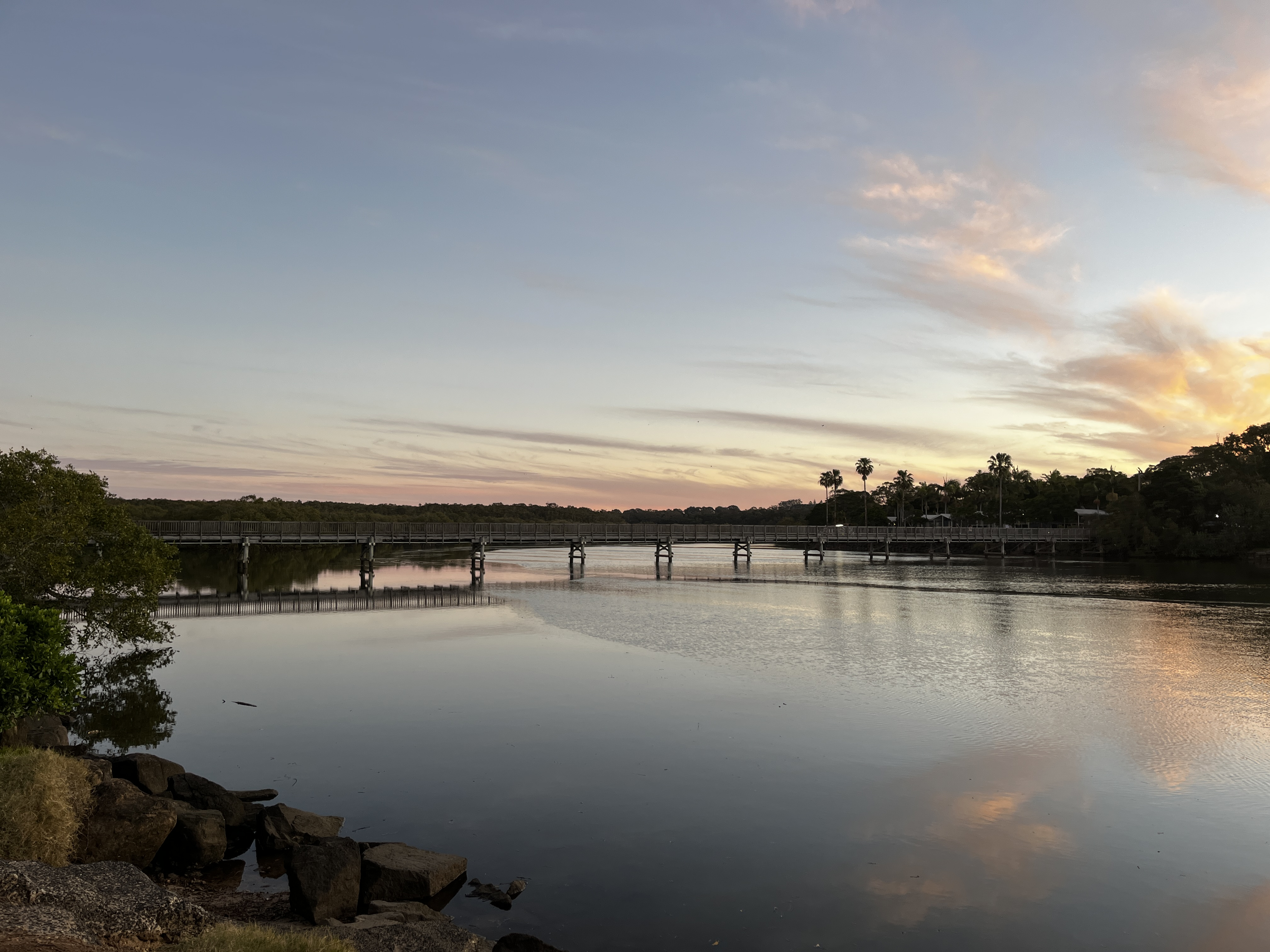
The Brunswick Heads footbridge, 2025

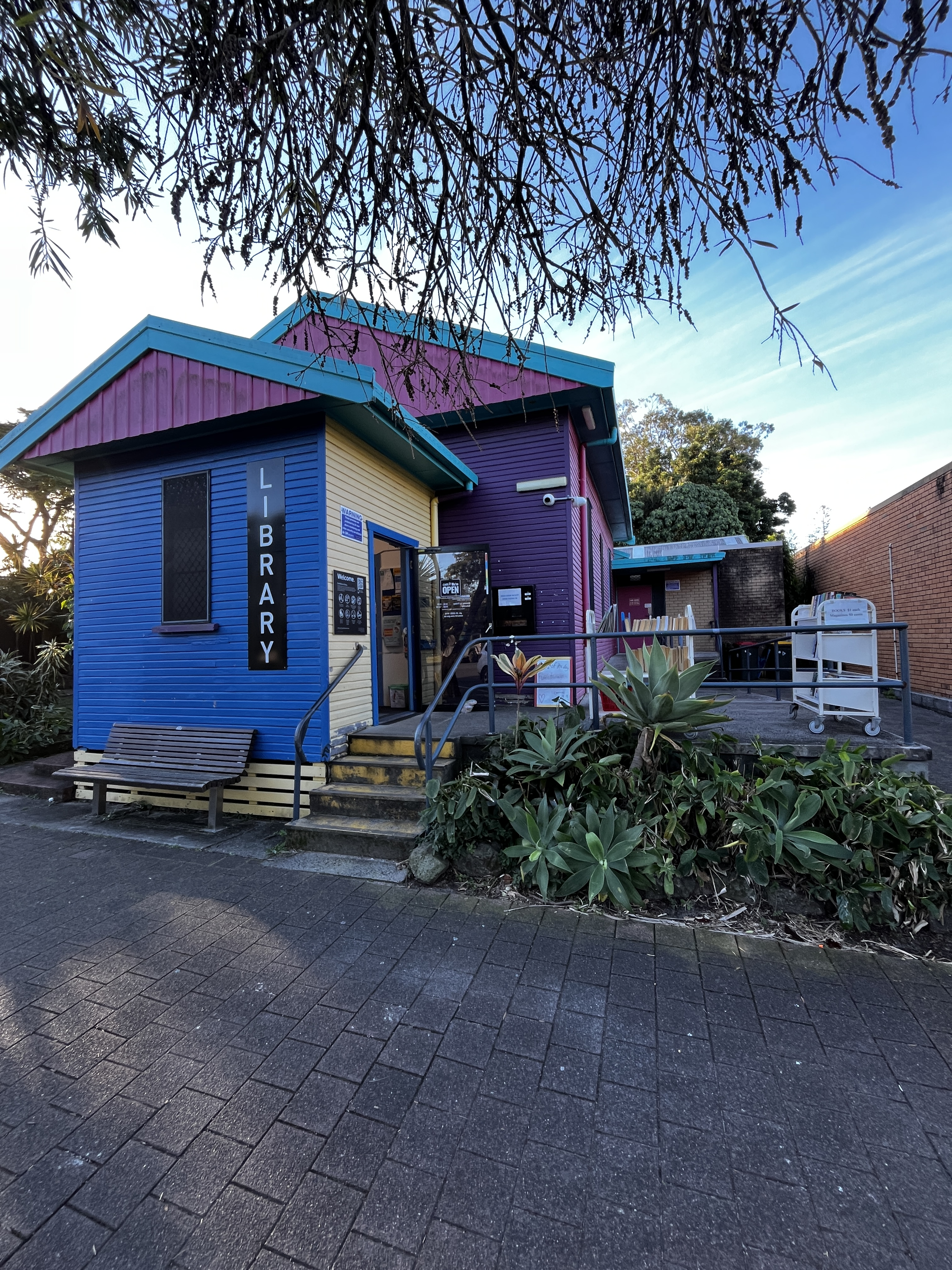
Brunswick Heads Library, 2025
