= List of government schools in New South Wales (T–Z) =

Prior to 1848, most schools in New South Wales were operated by churches or private organisations, with some financial support from the government under the Denominational School Board, which was established in 1836. In January 1848, the Board of National Education began establishing government schools to develop a public education system, with the enactment and royal assent (16 August 1848) of the National Education Board Act 1848 (NSW). The first public school, Kempsey National School, opened that year, and by 1851, more than 37 public schools were in operation in New South Wales. As of 2025, the New South Wales Department of Education, a department of the Government of New South Wales, administers more than 2,200 public schools, both primary and secondary schools, across that state, that are in these lists:

== T ==
Name	Suburb/Town	Region	Opened	Coordinates	Ref
Table Top Public School	Table Top	Riverina	1884	35°58′4.4″S 147°0′24.31″E	
Tabulam Public School	Tabulam	Northern Rivers	1879	28°53′20.93″S 152°34′3.87″E	
Tacking Point Public School	Port Macquarie	Mid North Coast	1996	31°28′19.12″S 152°55′35.51″E	
Tacoma Public School	Tacoma	Central Coast	1905	33°18′32″S 151°29′31″E	
Tahmoor Public School	Tahmoor	Macarthur	1917	34°13′39.4″S 150°35′22.58″E	
Talbingo Public School	Talbingo	Snowy Mountains	1965	35°34′49.11″S 148°18′3.13″E	
Tallimba Public School	Tallimba	Central West	1925	33°59′37.99″S 146°52′42.8″E	
Tallong Public School	Tallong	Southern Highlands	1865	34°43′17.43″S 150°4′59.72″E	
Tallowood School	Kellyville	Hills	2004	33°42′20.73″S 150°57′8.32″E	
Tambar Springs Public School	Tambar Springs	North West Slopes	1880	31°20′55.63″S 149°49′41.59″E	
Tamworth High School	South Tamworth	New England	1919	31°6′19.07″S 150°55′0.08″E	
Tamworth Public School	East Tamworth	New England	1855	31°5′4.77″S 150°56′10.79″E	
Tamworth South Public School	Tamworth	New England	1952	31°6′17.57″S 150°54′41.93″E	
Tamworth West Public School	West Tamworth	New England	1883	31°5′29.83″S 150°55′14.12″E	
Tangara School	Renwick	Southern Highlands	1972	34°27′6.17″S 150°28′8.35″E	
Tanilba Bay Public School	Tanilba Bay	Hunter	1982	32°43′44.88″S 152°0′15.43″E	
Tanja Public School	Tanja	Far South Coast	1878	36°38′25.42″S 149°58′31.21″E	
Tarago Public School	Tarago	Southern Tablelands	1892	35°4′4.11″S 149°39′17.86″E	
Taralga Public School	Taralga	Southern Highlands	1858	34°23′51.73″S 149°49′14.03″E	
Tarcutta Public School	Tarcutta	Riverina	1873	35°16′42.53″S 147°44′20.05″E	
Taree High School	Taree	Mid North Coast	1925	31°54′36.35″S 152°27′46.48″E	
Taree Public School	Taree	Mid North Coast	1865	31°54′38.35″S 152°27′42.98″E	
Taree West Public School	Taree	Mid North Coast	1953	31°54′26.21″S 152°26′43.18″E	
Taren Point Public School	Taren Point	Southern Sydney	1925	34°1′5.57″S 151°7′21.16″E	
Tarrawanna Public School	Tarrawanna	Illawarra	1952	34°22′49.11″S 150°53′18.84″E	
Tarro Public School	Tarro	Hunter	1961	32°48′37.05″S 151°39′49.02″E	
Tathra Public School	Tathra	South Coast	1912	36°43′58.55″S 149°58′47.47″E	
Taverners Hill Infants School	Petersham	Inner West	1903	33°53′19.53″S 151°9′24.39″E	
Tea Gardens Public School	Tea Gardens	Mid North Coast	1877	32°40′3.07″S 152°9′29.46″E	
Telarah Public School	Telarah	Hunter	1890	32°43′30.71″S 151°31′54.76″E	
Telegraph Point Public School	Telegraph Point	Mid North Coast	1876	32°43′30.19″S 151°31′54.29″E	
Telopea Public School	Telopea	Greater West	1956	33°47′49.09″S 151°2′36.3″E	
Temora High School	Temora	Riverina	1956	34°26′34.36″S 147°32′24.53″E	
Temora Public School	Temora	Riverina	1884	34°26′41.74″S 147°32′6.92″E	
Temora West Public School	Temora	Riverina	1959	34°27′3.49″S 147°31′25.97″E	
Tempe High School	Tempe	Inner West	1874	33°55′13.22″S 151°9′39.23″E	
Tempe Public School	Tempe	Inner West	1863	33°55′16.64″S 151°9′38.18″E	
Tenambit Public School	Tenambit	Hunter	1902	32°44′32.11″S 151°36′19.95″E	
Tenterfield High School	Tenterfield	Northern Tablelands	1962	29°3′12.94″S 152°1′5.5″E	
Teralba Public School	Teralba	Hunter	1884	32°57′45.38″S 151°36′21.77″E	
Terara Public School	Terara	South Coast	1878	34°52′0.61″S 150°37′49.29″E	
Terranora Public School	Terranora	Northern Rivers	1906	28°14′24.34″S 153°30′0.02″E	
Terrey Hills Public School	Terrey Hills	Northern Beaches	1938	33°41′7.1″S 151°13′25.19″E	
Terrigal High School	Terrigal	Central Coast	1978	33°26′28.28″S 151°25′45.01″E	
Terrigal Public School	Terrigal	Central Coast	1910	33°26′32.04″S 151°26′18.86″E	
Teven-Tintenbar Public School	Tintenbar	Northern Rivers	1988	28°47′42.08″S 153°30′2.74″E	
Thalgarrah Environmental Education Centre	Armidale	New England	1976	30°26′51.67″S 151°49′29.97″E	
Tharawal Public School	Illawong	Southern Sydney		34°0′10.63″S 151°1′36.01″E	
Tharbogang Public School	Tharbogang	Riverina	1929	34°15′39.19″S 145°59′4.18″E	
The Beach School	Allambie Heights	Northern Beaches	2001	33°46′19.13″S 151°15′43.18″E	
The Channon Public School	The Channon	Northern Rivers	1909	28°40′29.35″S 153°16′47.11″E	
The Children's Hospital School	Westmead	Greater West	1995	33°48′5.05″S 150°59′31.6″E	
The Crescent School	Goulburn	Southern Tablelands	1969	34°44′38.99″S 149°42′36.84″E	
The Entrance Public School	The Entrance	Central Coast	1915	33°20′48.81″S 151°29′34.01″E	
The Forest High School	Frenchs Forest	Northern Beaches	1961	33°45′1.68″S 151°13′47.51″E	
The Grange Public School	Minto	Southern Sydney	1980	34°1′20.89″S 150°51′24.01″E	
The Hills School	Northmead	Greater West	1978	33°46′47.06″S 151°0′13.07″E	
The Jannali High School	Jannali	Southern Sydney	1956	34°1′19.42″S 151°3′39.94″E	
The Junction Public School	The Junction	Hunter	1872	32°56′21.71″S 151°45′29.85″E	
The Meadows Public School	Seven Hills	Greater Sydney	1890	33°46′53.19″S 150°56′33.2″E	
The Oaks Public School	The Oaks	Macarthur	1862	34°4′43.85″S 150°34′15.51″E	
The Pocket Public School	The Pocket	Northern Rivers	1900	28°30′18.66″S 153°28′44.15″E	
The Ponds High School	The Ponds	Greater West	2015	33°42′12.85″S 150°53′51.69″E	
The Ponds School	The Ponds	Greater West	2012	33°41′52.25″S 150°54′41.25″E	
The Risk Public School	The Risk	Northern Rivers	1908	28°28′35.8″S 152°55′59.74″E	
The Rock Central School	The Rock	Riverina	1884	35°16′0.46″S 147°6′54.96″E	
The Sir Henry Parkes Memorial Public School	Tenterfield	Northern Tablelands	1864	29°3′22.33″S 152°1′31.04″E	
Thirlmere Public School	Thirlmere	Macarthur	1888	34°12′15.05″S 150°34′11.07″E	
Thirroul Public School	Thirroul	Illawarra	1889	34°18′56.16″S 150°55′6.28″E	
Thomas Acres Public School	Ambarvale	South West	1982	34°5′37.78″S 150°47′24.46″E	
Thomas Reddall High School	Ambarvale	South-Western Sydney	1991	34°4′54.41″S 150°48′11.17″E	
Thornleigh West Public School	Thornleigh	Upper North Shore	1961	33°43′27.81″S 151°4′19.3″E	
Thornton Public School	Thornton	Lower Hunter	1919	32°46′46.64″S 151°38′28.51″E	
Thurgoona Public School	Thurgoona	Riverina	1860	36°2′51.22″S 146°58′58.33″E	
Tibooburra Outback Public School	Tibooburra	Far West, New South Wales	1885	29°25′57.43″S 142°0′36.46″E	
Tighes Hill Public School	Tighes Hill	Hunter	1878	32°54′29.56″S 151°45′5.08″E	
Timbumburi Public School	Timbumburi	New England	1911	31°12′13.55″S 150°54′59.25″E	
Tingha Public School	Tingha	Northern Tablelands	1874	29°57′30.7″S 151°12′48.87″E	
Tinonee Public School	Tinonee	Mid North Coast	1859	31°55′58.99″S 152°24′50.97″E	
Tintinhull Public School	Tintinhull	North West	1882	31°5′6.29″S 151°0′31.3″E	
Tirranna Public School	Tirranna	Southern Tablelands	1869	34°49′16.4″S 149°40′54.05″E	
Tocumwal Public School	Tocumwal	Riverina	1881	35°48′49.73″S 145°34′5.06″E	
Tomaree High School	Salamander Bay	Hunter	1975	32°44′10.25″S 152°6′42.77″E	
Tomaree Public School	Salamander Bay	Hunter	1886	32°44′10.12″S 152°6′42.93″E	
Tomerong Public School	Tomerong	South Coast	1862	35°3′14.91″S 150°35′11.96″E	
Tooleybuc Central School	Tooleybuc	Riverina	1916	35°1′37.63″S 143°20′14.56″E	
Toomelah Public School	Toomelah	Far North-West	1912	28°40′11.99″S 150°28′45.34″E	
Toongabbie East Public School	Constitution Hill	Greater Sydney	1966	33°47′48.64″S 150°58′44.66″E	
Toongabbie Public School	Old Toongabbie	Greater West	1886	33°47′14.59″S 150°57′59.48″E	
Toongabbie West Public School	Toongabbie	Greater West	1967	33°47′33.08″S 150°57′26.13″E	
Tooraweenah Public School	Tooraweenah	Central West	1884	31°26′6.05″S 148°54′40.62″E	
Toormina High School	Toormina	Mid North Coast	1980	30°21′4.4″S 153°5′3.46″E	
Toormina Public School	Toormina	Mid North Coast	1979	30°21′11.37″S 153°4′59.24″E	
Toronto High School	Toronto	Hunter	1962	33°0′31.96″S 151°35′0.1″E	
Toronto Public School	Toronto	Hunter	1890	33°0′31.84″S 151°35′42.47″E	
Tottenham Central School	Tottenham	Central West	1908	32°14′42.54″S 147°21′10.24″E	
Toukley Public School	Toukley	Central Coast	1891	33°16′4.97″S 151°33′3.77″E	
Towamba Public School	Towamba	South Coast	1862	37°5′5.86″S 149°41′40.53″E	
Tower Street Public School	Panania	South West	1959	33°57′26.4″S 151°0′29.03″E	
Towradgi Public School	Fairy Meadow	Illawarra	1953	34°23′22.6″S 150°54′5.54″E	
Trangie Central School	Trangie	Orana	1884	32°1′55.7″S 147°58′48.27″E	
Tregeagle Public School	Tregeagle	Northern Rivers	1890	28°51′15.88″S 153°21′16.75″E	
Tregear Public School	Tregear	Greater West	1968	33°44′46.6″S 150°47′41.71″E	
Trundle Central School	Trundle	Central Coast	1883	32°55′30.15″S 147°42′37.91″E	
Trunkey Public School	Trunkey Creek	Central West	1870	33°48′59.51″S 149°19′30.13″E	
Truscott Street Public School	North Ryde	Northern Suburbs	1958	33°47′39.11″S 151°7′47.38″E	
Tucabia Public School	Tucabia	Northern Rivers	1891	29°40′1.85″S 153°6′25.78″E	
Tuggerah Lakes Secondary College – Berkeley Vale Campus	Berkeley Vale	Central Coast	1983	33°20′35.51″S 151°25′27.53″E	
Tuggerah Lakes Secondary College - The Entrance Campus	Long Jetty	Central Coast	1970	33°22′20.2″S 151°28′31.06″E	
Tuggerah Lakes Secondary College – Tumbi Umbi Campus	Tumbi Umbi	Central Coast	2002	33°23′44.69″S 151°27′13.49″E	
Tuggerah Public School	Tuggerah	Central Coast	1892	33°18′46.61″S 151°24′54.8″E	
Tuggerawong Public School	Tuggerawong	Central Coast	1957	33°16′46.88″S 151°29′10.88″E	
Tullamore Central School	Tullamore	Central Coast	1890	32°38′8.32″S 147°33′54.9″E	
Tullibigeal Central School	Tullibigeal	Central Coast	1920	33°25′20.86″S 146°43′26.92″E	
Tulloona Public School	Tulloona	New England	1959	28°52′7.38″S 150°6′6.11″E	
Tumbarumba High School	Tumbarumba	South West Slopes	1968	35°46′56.16″S 148°1′2.06″E	
Tumbarumba Public School	Tumbarumba	South West Slopes	1868	35°46′32.59″S 148°0′48.82″E	
Tumbulgum Public School	Tumbulgum	Northern Rivers	1875	28°16′27.62″S 153°27′46.69″E	
Tumut High School	Tumut	Riverina	1961	35°18′45.89″S 148°13′8.14″E	
Tumut Public School	Tumut	Riverina	1859	35°18′11.45″S 148°13′6.97″E	
Tuncurry Public School	Tuncurry	Mid North Coast	1881	32°10′18.62″S 152°29′43.06″E	
Tuntable Creek Public School	Tuntable Creek	Northern Rivers	1923	28°37′54.27″S 153°15′57.57″E	
Turramurra High School	South Turramurra	Upper North Shore	1968	33°45′23.56″S 151°6′47.69″E	
Turramurra North Public School	North Turramurra	Upper North Shore	1914	33°42′53.7″S 151°8′52.07″E	
Turramurra Public School	Turramurra	Upper North Shore	1953	33°44′38.71″S 151°6′47.84″E	
Turvey Park Public School	Turvey Park	Riverina	1953	35°7′46.4″S 147°21′25.16″E	
Tweed Heads Public School	Tweed Heads	Northern Rivers	1876	28°10′10.3″S 153°32′30.64″E	
Tweed Heads South Public School	Tweed Heads South	Northern Rivers	1958	28°11′41.86″S 153°32′22.83″E	
Tweed River High School	Tweed Heads South	Northern Rivers	1961	28°11′45.46″S 153°32′25.14″E	
Tyalgum Public School	Tyalgum	Northern Rivers	1907	28°21′17.74″S 153°12′14.33″E	
Tyalla Public School	Coffs Harbour	Mid North Coast	1978	30°17′2.05″S 153°6′43.3″E	

== U ==
Name	Suburb/Town	Region	Opened	Coordinates	Ref
Uki Public School	Uki	Northern Rivers	1895	28°24′51.09″S 153°20′5.02″E	
Ulan Public School	Ulan	Central West	1884	32°16′50.96″S 149°44′34.3″E	
Ulladulla High School	Ulladulla	South Coast	1974	35°21′35.44″S 150°28′14.06″E	
Ulladulla Public School	Ulladulla	South Coast	1861	35°21′21.96″S 150°28′12.65″E	
Ulmarra Public School	Ulmarra	Northern Rivers	1891	29°37′45.2″S 153°1′48.96″E	
Ulong Public School	Ulong	Mid North Coast	1910	30°14′35.04″S 152°53′4.03″E	
Ultimo Public School	Ultimo	Inner Sydney	1858	33°52′38.98″S 151°11′45.07″E	
Umina Beach Public School	Umina Beach	Central Coast	1956	33°31′30.85″S 151°18′51.97″E	
Unanderra Public School	Cordeaux Heights	Illawarra	1878	34°26′42.41″S 150°50′4.9″E	
Undercliffe Public School	Undercliffe	South West	1928	33°31′30.79″S 151°18′51.92″E	
Ungarie Central School	Ungarie	Central West	1891	33°38′16.37″S 146°58′38.69″E	
Upper Coopers Creek Public School	Upper Coopers Creek	Northern Rivers	1949	28°36′26.77″S 153°24′6.53″E	
Upper Lansdowne Public School	Upper Lansdowne	Mid North Coast	1895	31°42′19″S 152°28′2.47″E	
Uralla Central School	Uralla	Northern Tablelands	1862	30°38′27.03″S 151°29′40.22″E	
Urana Central School	Urana	Riverina	1868	30°38′27.03″S 151°29′40.06″E	
Uranquinty Public School	Uranquinty	Riverina	1880	35°11′20.87″S 147°14′57.34″E	
Urbenville Public School	Urbenville	Northern Rivers	1910	28°28′23.95″S 152°32′42.28″E	
Urunga Public School	Urunga	Mid North Coast	1882	30°29′42.4″S 153°1′14.72″E	

== V ==
Name	Suburb/Town	Region	Opened	Coordinates	Ref
Vacy Public School	Vacy	Hunter	1859	32°32′30.35″S 151°34′37.13″E	
Valentine Public School	Valentine	Hunter	1958	33°0′30.75″S 151°38′33.27″E	
Valley View Public School	Wyoming	Central Coast	1980	33°23′59.05″S 151°21′43.21″E	
Vardys Road Public School	Kings Langley	Greater West	1960	33°45′28.23″S 150°56′30.77″E	
Vaucluse Public School	Vaucluse	Eastern Sydney	1858	33°51′2.78″S 151°16′52.57″E	
Verona School	Verona	Greater West	2001	33°52′5.96″S 150°58′16.21″E	
Victoria Avenue Public School	Concord West	Inner West	2015	33°50′52.93″S 151°4′58.8″E	
Villawood East Public School	Villawood	Greater West	1955	33°53′23.13″S 150°59′8.54″E	
Villawood North Public School	Fairfield East	Greater West	1953	33°52′39.19″S 150°58′21.98″E	
Vincentia High School	Vincentia	South Coast	1993	35°4′39.69″S 150°39′53.95″E	
Vincentia Public School	Vincentia	South Coast	1992	35°4′22.6″S 150°40′9.94″E	
Vineyard Public School	Vineyard	Greater West	1872	33°38′49.32″S 150°51′29.6″E	

== W ==
Name	Suburb/Town	Region	Opened	Coordinates	Ref
Wadalba Community School	Wadalba	Central Coast	2000	33°15′53.96″S 151°27′55.43″E	
Wagga Wagga High School	Wagga Wagga	Riverina	1912	35°7′26.09″S 147°21′54.01″E	
Wagga Wagga Public School	Wagga Wagga	Riverina	1861	35°6′26.78″S 147°21′57.07″E	
Wahroonga Public School	Wahroonga	Upper North Shore	1944	33°42′56.43″S 151°7′42.37″E	
Wairoa School	Bondi Beach	Eastern Sydney	1961	33°53′11.36″S 151°16′40.98″E	
Waitara Public School	Wahroonga	Upper North Shore	1927	33°42′29.91″S 151°6′38.27″E	
Wakefield School	Wakefield	Hunter	2002	32°57′24.31″S 151°33′51.91″E	
Wakehurst Public School	Belrose	Northern Beaches	1966	33°44′20.68″S 151°13′4.59″E	
Wakool Burraboi Public School	Wakool	Riverina	1904	35°27′58.92″S 144°23′34.97″E	
Walbundrie Public School	Walbundrie	Riverina	1878	35°41′15.76″S 146°43′34.45″E	
Walcha Central School	Walcha	Northern Tablelands	1859	30°58′49.21″S 151°36′11.71″E	
Walgett Community College High School	Walgett	Orana	1972	30°1′34.52″S 148°7′5.99″E	
Walgett Community College Primary School	Walgett	Orana	1875	30°1′10.39″S 148°7′0.38″E	
Walhallow Public School	Walhallow	North West Slopes	1908	31°23′42.64″S 150°25′11.99″E	
Walla Walla Public School	Walla Walla	Riverina	1869	35°45′33.95″S 146°54′7.15″E	
Wallabadah Public School	Walabadah	Northern Tablelands	1867	31°32′27.02″S 150°49′41.77″E	
Wallacia Public School	Wallacia	Greater West	1897	31°32′27.02″S 150°49′41.31″E	
Wallendbeen Public School	Wallendbeen	South West Slopes	1881	34°31′27.81″S 148°9′32.35″E	
Wallerawang Public School	Wallerawang	Central Tablelands	1860	33°25′9.86″S 150°4′13.42″E	
Wallsend Public School	Wallsend	Hunter	1862	32°54′28.08″S 151°40′19.24″E	
Wallsend South Public School	Wallsend	Hunter	1910	32°55′13.87″S 151°40′34.37″E	
Walters Road Public School	Blacktown	Greater West	1963	33°47′5.18″S 150°53′30.59″E	
Wambangalang Environmental Education Centre	Dubbo	Central West	1976	32°29′17.42″S 148°33′18.89″E	
Wamberal Public School	Wamberal	Central Coast	1877	33°24′42.83″S 151°26′54.01″E	
Wamoon Public School	Wamoon	Riverina	1916	34°31′31.96″S 146°19′50.89″E	
Wanaaring Public School	Wanaaring	Far West	1887	29°42′17.99″S 144°8′46.03″E	
Wangee Park School	Campsie	Inner West	1985	33°54′30.4″S 151°5′46.34″E	
Wangi Wangi Public School	Wangi Wangi	Hunter	1920	33°4′21.01″S 151°34′56.99″E	
Waniora Public School	Bulli	Illawarra	1954	34°20′10.04″S 150°55′7.89″E	
Waratah Public School	Waratah	Hunter	1864	32°54′19.58″S 151°43′20.62″E	
Waratah West Public School	Waratah West	Hunter	1954	32°53′56.79″S 151°42′56.32″E	
Wardell Public School	Wardell	Northern Rivers	1867	28°57′2.97″S 153°28′5.22″E	
Warialda High School	Warialda	North West Slopes	1976	29°32′53.36″S 150°34′24.37″E	
Warialda Public School	Warialda	North West Slopes	1851	29°32′27.88″S 150°34′26.6″E	
Warilla High School	Barrack Heights	Illawarra	1965	34°33′49.95″S 150°51′28.55″E	
Warilla North Public School	Warilla	Illawarra	1964	34°32′49.29″S 150°51′10.56″E	
Warilla High School	Barrack Heights	Illawarra	1965	34°33′24.11″S 150°51′14.5″E	
Warners Bay High School	Warners Bay	Hunter	1966	32°58′5.71″S 151°39′8.2″E	
Warners Bay Public School	Warners Bay	Hunter		32°58′46.6″S 151°38′53.42″E	
Warnervale Public School	Hamlyn Terrace	Central Coast	1958	33°15′2.01″S 151°28′3.8″E	
Warragamba Public School	Warragamba	Greater West	1948	33°15′1.68″S 151°28′9.58″E	
Warrawee Public School	Warrawee	Upper North Shore	1906	33°43′46.39″S 151°7′16.04″E	
Warrawong High School	Warrawong	Illawarra	1972	34°28′49.82″S 150°52′31.91″E	
Warrawong Public School	Warrawong	Illawarra	1935	34°28′53.7″S 150°52′39.57″E	
Warren Central School	Warren	Orana	1867	31°42′14.42″S 147°50′8.51″E	
Warrimoo Public School	Warrimoo	Lower Blue Mountains	1962	33°43′38.64″S 150°35′57.58″E	
Warrumbungle National Park Environmental Education Centre	Warrumbungle	Orana	1989	31°16′32.09″S 148°59′45.62″E	
Warwick Farm Public School	Warwick Farm	South West	1947	33°54′37.88″S 150°55′44.2″E	
Waterfall Public School	Waterfall	Southern Sydney	1901	34°8′15.62″S 150°59′45.66″E	
Wattawa Heights Public School	Bankstown	South West	1956	33°54′54.77″S 151°0′43.46″E	
Wattle Flat Public School	Wattle Flat	Central West	1858	33°8′30.01″S 149°41′33.28″E	
Wattle Grove Public School	Wattle Grove	South West	2001	33°57′31.5″S 150°56′12.47″E	
Wauchope High School	Wauchope	Mid North Coast	1954	31°27′4.67″S 152°43′51.25″E	
Wauchope Public School	Wauchope	Mid North Coast	1868	31°27′20.06″S 152°43′45.5″E	
Waverley Public School	Waverley	Eastern Sydney	1879	33°53′54.8″S 151°15′5.99″E	
Wee Jasper Public School	Wee Jasper	Southern Tablelands	1899	35°6′35.03″S 148°40′24.91″E	
Wee Waa High School	Wee Waa	North West Slopes	1939	30°13′23.53″S 149°26′26.71″E	
Wee Waa Public School	Wee Waa	North West Slopes	1870	30°13′26.54″S 149°26′33.63″E	
Weethalle Public School	Weethalle	Riverina	1926	33°52′45.87″S 146°37′10″E	
Weilmoringle Public School	Weilmoringle	Far West	1961	29°14′24.03″S 146°55′12.46″E	
Wellington High School	Wellington	Central West	1958	32°32′51.21″S 148°56′47″E	
Wellington Public School	Wellington	Central West	1861	32°33′24.76″S 148°56′34.46″E	
Wentworth Falls Public School	Wentworth Falls	Blue Mountains	1887	33°42′48.08″S 150°22′21.6″E	
Wentworth Point Public School	Wentworth Point	Greater West	2018	33°49′24.5″S 151°4′48.07″E	
Wentworth Public School	Wentworth	Far West	1860	33°49′24.5″S 151°4′48.07″E	
Wentworthville Public School	Wentworthville	Greater West	1891	33°48′50.41″S 150°58′6.97″E	
Werrington County Public School	Werrington County	Greater West	1982	33°44′42.43″S 150°44′50.3″E	
Werrington Public School	Werrington	Greater West	1974	33°45′15.29″S 150°44′47.14″E	
Werris Creek Public School	Werris Creek	North West Slopes	1883	31°20′56.65″S 150°39′3.54″E	
West Pennant Hills Public School	West Pennant Hills	Hills	1850	33°44′45.34″S 151°3′0.76″E	
West Pymble Public School	West Pymble	Upper North Shore	1963	33°45′50.03″S 151°7′27.17″E	
West Ryde Public School	West Ryde	Northern Sydney	1907	33°48′29.86″S 151°5′6.52″E	
West Wallsend High School	West Wallsend	Hunter	1964	32°54′40.68″S 151°34′57.1″E	
West Wallsend Public School	West Wallsend	Hunter	1964	32°54′15.18″S 151°34′51.86″E	
West Wyalong High School	West Wyalong	Riverina.	1964	33°54′59.43″S 147°12′9.04″E	
West Wyalong Public School	West Wyalong	Riverina	1894	33°55′5.44″S 147°12′17.29″E	
Westdale Public School	Westdale	New England	1913	31°5′40.12″S 150°52′26.18″E	
Westfields Sports High School	Fairfield West	Greater West	1963	33°52′4.7″S 150°55′11.92″E	
Westlawn Public School	Grafton	Northern Rivers	1955	29°40′13.03″S 152°55′48.75″E	
Westmead Public School	Westmead	Greater West	1917	33°48′37.96″S 150°59′11.42″E	
Weston Public School	Weston	Hunter	1905	32°48′31.1″S 151°27′37.63″E	
Westport Public School	Westport	Mid North Coast	1970	31°26′13.8″S 152°53′30.53″E	
Wetlands Environmental Education Centre	Shortland	Hunter	1986	32°52′33.91″S 151°41′49.04″E	
Wewak Street School	North Albury	Riverina	1972	36°3′29.71″S 146°55′46.84″E	
Whalan Public School	Whalan	Greater West	1969	36°3′29.77″S 146°55′46.95″E	
Wheeler Heights Public School	Collaroy Plateau	Northern Beaches	1961	33°43′41.11″S 151°17′5.41″E	
Whian Whian Public School	Whian Whian	Northern Rivers	1910	28°38′17.4″S 153°18′52.69″E	
Whitebridge High School	Whitebridge	Hunter	1963	32°58′21.35″S 151°42′46.61″E	
White Cliffs Public School	White Cliffs	Far West	1895	30°51′1.17″S 143°5′21.97″E	
Whitton Public School	Whitton	Riverina	1884	34°31′8.33″S 146°10′52.18″E	
Wiangaree Public School	Wiangaree	Northern Rivers	1908	34°31′8.33″S 146°10′52.18″E	
Widemere Public School	Greystanes	Greater West	1973	33°49′59.5″S 150°56′24.6″E	
Wideview Public School	Greystanes	Greater West	1973	33°36′31.12″S 151°8′30.18″E	
Wilberforce Public School	Wilberforce	Hawkesbury	1880	33°33′29.63″S 150°50′22.64″E	
Wilcannia Central School	Far West	Hawkesbury	1880	31°33′31.42″S 143°22′31.6″E	
Wiley Park Girls High School	Wiley Park	Greater West	1957	33°55′26.16″S 151°3′59.57″E	
Wiley Park Public School	Wiley Park	Greater West	1983	33°55′24.76″S 151°4′6.77″E	
Wilkins Public School	Marrickville	Inner West	1982	33°54′6.13″S 151°9′22.62″E	
Willans Hill School	Turvey Park	Riverina	1973	35°7′37.09″S 147°22′0.15″E	
Willawarrin Public School	Willawarrin	Mid North Coast	1901	30°55′34.34″S 152°37′30.62″E	
William Dean Public School	Dean Park	Greater West	1988	33°44′4.51″S 150°51′32.27″E	
William Rose School	Seven Hills	Greater West	1962	33°46′8.4″S 150°56′12.94″E	
William Stimson Public School	Wetherill Park	Greater West	1986	33°51′14.48″S 150°54′19.42″E	
Willmot Public School	Willmot	Greater West	1973	33°43′33.46″S 150°47′38.26″E	
Willoughby Girls High School	Willoughby	Lower North Shore	1934	33°48′9.01″S 151°11′58.23″E	
Willoughby Public School	Willoughby	Lower North Shore	1863	33°48′7.13″S 151°12′3.91″E	
Willow Tree Public School	Willow Tree	Liverpool Plains	1882	31°39′23.89″S 150°43′41.56″E	
Willyama High School	Broken Hill	Far West	1974	31°56′11.01″S 141°28′17.51″E	
Wilson Park School	East Lismore	Northern Rivers	1978	28°49′54″S 153°17′33.77″E	
Wilsons Creek Public School	Wilsons Creek	Northern Rivers	1908	28°34′16.13″S 153°25′33.67″E	
Windale Public School	Windale	Hunter	1953	32°59′32.4″S 151°40′42.15″E	
Windang Public School	Windang	Illawarra	1942	34°31′55.56″S 150°51′58.91″E	
Windellama Public School	Windellama	Southern Tablelands	1880	35°0′36.64″S 149°50′1.91″E	
Windsor High School	McGraths Hill	Greater West	1969	33°37′8.91″S 150°49′57.59″E	
Windsor Public School	Windsor	Greater West	1869	33°36′36.8″S 150°48′58.34″E	
Windsor South Public School	South Windsor	Greater West	1957	33°37′5.5″S 150°48′15.64″E	
Wingello Public School	Wingello	Southern Highlands	1885	34°41′17.78″S 150°9′8.28″E	
Wingham Brush Public School	Wingham	Mid North Coast	1877	31°52′11.16″S 152°22′34.14″E	
Wingham High School	Wingham	Mid North Coast	1962	31°52′5.05″S 152°22′50.28″E	
Wingham Public School	Wingham	Mid North Coast	1864	31°51′51.59″S 152°21′1.21″E	
Winmalee High School	Winmalee	Blue Mountains	1985	33°40′29.69″S 150°36′57.04″E	
Winmalee Public School	Winmalee	Blue Mountains	1972	33°40′11.43″S 150°36′39.07″E	
Winston Heights Public School	Winston Hills	Greater West	1974	33°46′30.32″S 150°58′4.02″E	
Winston Hills Public School	Winston Hills	Greater West	1970	33°46′24.35″S 150°58′51.31″E	
Wirreanda Public School	Medowie	Hunter	1985	32°44′37.19″S 151°52′35.51″E	
Wisemans Ferry Public School	Wisemans Ferry	Hawkesbury	1867	33°23′8.29″S 150°59′7.07″E	
Wollar Public School	Wollar	Central West	1873	32°21′23.68″S 149°56′55.8″E	
Wollondilly Public School	Goulburn	Southern Tablelands	1970	34°44′32.23″S 149°42′39.55″E	
Wollongbar Public School	Wollongbar	Northern Rivers	1900	28°49′35.86″S 153°25′9.43″E	
Wollongong High School of the Performing Arts	Fairy Meadow	Illawarra	1916	34°24′21.77″S 150°53′22.8″E	
Wollongong Public School	Wollongong	Illawarra	1826	34°25′20.23″S 150°53′46.83″E	
Wollongong West Public School	West Wollongong	Illawarra	1925	34°25′28.28″S 150°52′18.29″E	
Wollumbin High School	Murwillumbah	Northern Rivers	1995	28°20′2.38″S 153°21′44.66″E	
Wolumla Public School	Wolumla	South Coast	1882	36°49′55.55″S 149°48′39.97″E	
Wombat Public School	Wombat	South West Slopes	1868	34°25′36.25″S 148°14′41.36″E	
Wongarbon Public School	Wongarbon	Orana	1887	32°20′0.65″S 148°45′35.3″E	
Woniora Road School	Hurstville	Southern Sydney	1982	33°58′15.62″S 151°6′11.14″E	
Woodberry Public School	Woodberry	Hunter	1973	32°47′29.95″S 151°40′11.56″E	
Woodburn Public School	Woodburn	Northern Rivers	1871	29°4′31.61″S 153°20′19.31″E	
Woodenbong Central School	Woodenbong	Northern Rivers	1908	28°23′20.08″S 152°36′38.92″E	
Woodland Road Public School	St Helens Park	South West	1976	34°5′49.42″S 150°48′55.54″E	
Woodport Public School	Erina	Central Coast	1892	33°26′22.19″S 151°22′45.24″E	
Woodstock Public School	Woodstock	Central West	1879	33°44′40.66″S 148°50′53.27″E	
Wooglemai Environmental Education Centre	Oakdale	South West	1973	34°8′8.6″S 150°30′0.02″E	
Woolbrook Public School	Woolbrook	Northern Tablelands	1880	30°58′10.9″S 151°20′40.7″E	
Woolgoolga High School	Woolgoolga	Mid North Coast	1981	30°6′2.45″S 153°11′24.48″E	
Woolgoolga Public School	Woolgoolga	Mid North Coast	1884	30°6′45.91″S 153°11′45.75″E	
Wooli Public School	Wooli	Northern Rivers	1942	29°52′16.16″S 153°15′56.06″E	
Woollahra Public School	Woollahra	Eastern Suburbs	1878	33°53′11.9″S 151°14′28.69″E	
Woolomin Public School	Woolomin	Northern Tablelands	1885	31°18′6.78″S 151°8′54.16″E	
Woolooware High School	Woolooware	Southern Sydney	1968	34°2′23.2″S 151°8′40.78″E	
Woolooware High School	Woolooware	Southern Sydney	1951	34°2′42.33″S 151°8′45.4″E	
Woongarrah Public School	Woongarrah	Central Coast	2005	33°14′30.65″S 151°29′3.79″E	
Woonona East Public School	Woonona	Illawarra	1964	34°21′7.57″S 150°54′57.12″E	
Woonona High School	Woonona	Illawarra	1964	34°21′7.57″S 150°54′57.12″E	
Woonona Public School	Woonona	Illawarra	1882	34°20′47.76″S 150°54′22.34″E	
Woronora River Public School	Woronora River	Southern Sydney	1882	34°1′35.03″S 151°2′29.69″E	
Woy Woy Public School	Woy Woy	Central Coast	1884	33°29′28.46″S 151°19′42.56″E	
Woy Woy South Public School	Woy Woy	Central Coast	1964	33°30′13.4″S 151°19′17.94″E	
Wyalong Public School	Wyalong	Northern Riverina	1894	33°55′27.75″S 147°14′33.2″E	
Wyangala Dam Public School	Wyangala	Northern Riverina	1894	33°58′0.04″S 148°56′49.8″E	
Wyee Public School	Wyee	Hunter	1879	33°10′31.84″S 151°28′58.49″E	
Wyndham College	Nirimba Fields	Greater West	1999	33°10′31.72″S 151°28′58.81″E	
Wyndham Public School	Nirimba Fields	Greater West	1999	36°55′46.19″S 149°38′48.19″E	
Wyoming Public School	Wyoming	Central Coast	1969	33°24′33.24″S 151°21′20.41″E	
Wyong Creek Public School	Wyong Creek	Central Coast	1883	33°16′2.99″S 151°20′53.33″E	
Wyong High School	Wyong	Central Coast	1947	33°16′55.35″S 151°25′5.5″E	
Wyong Public School	Wyong	Central Coast	1888	33°16′17.78″S 151°25′33.31″E	
Wyrallah Public School	Wyrallah	Northern Rivers	1867	28°53′25.54″S 153°18′20.37″E	
Wyrallah Road Public School	East Lismore	Northern Rivers	1954	28°49′50.24″S 153°17′35″E	
Wytaliba Public School	Wytaliba	Northern Tablelands	1984	29°41′30.72″S 152°6′35.81″E	

== Y ==
Name	Suburb/Town	Region	Opened	Coordinates	Ref
Yagoona Public School	Yagoona	South West	1952	33°54′31.89″S 151°1′35.41″E	
Yamba Public School	Yamba	Northern Rivers	1868	29°26′26.14″S 153°21′8.09″E	
Yandelora School	Narellan	Greater West	2019	34°2′35.05″S 150°43′55.12″E	
Yanco Agricultural High School	Yanco	Riverina	1883	34°38′7.08″S 146°22′52.63″E	
Yanderra Public School	Yanderra	Macarthur	1935	34°19′15.77″S 150°34′15.9″E	
Yarrawarrah Public School	Yarrawarrah	Southern Sydney	1969	34°3′23.29″S 151°1′38.47″E	
Yarrowitch Public School	Yarrowitch	Northern Tablelands	1887	31°15′5.19″S 151°56′51.16″E	
Yass High School	Yass	Southern Tablelands	1961	34°50′7.17″S 148°54′39.63″E	
Yass Public School	Yass	Southern Tablelands	1879	34°50′17.51″S 148°54′24.92″E	
Yates Avenue Public School	Dundas Valley	Greater West	1958	33°47′44.13″S 151°3′30.32″E	
Yenda Public School	Yenda	Riverina	1920	34°15′10.09″S 146°11′53.06″E	
Yennora Public School	Yennora	Greater West	1955	33°51′59.3″S 150°58′16.24″E	
Yeo Park Infants School	Ashfield	Inner West	1918	33°51′58.92″S 150°58′16.24″E	
Yeoval Central School	Yeoval	Central West	1883	32°45′14.56″S 148°38′59.92″E	
Yerong Creek Public School	Yerong Creek	Riverina	1881	35°23′13.54″S 147°3′39.31″E	
Yetman Public School	Yetman	Northern Tablelands	1867	28°54′8.56″S 150°46′34.52″E	
Yoogali Public School	Yoogali	Riverina	1917	34°17′59.57″S 146°5′8.16″E	
York Public School	South Penrith	Greater West	1976	33°46′36.08″S 150°41′51.96″E	
Young High School	Young	South West Slopes	1946	34°19′0.97″S 148°17′32.59″E	
Young North Public School	Young	South Western Slopes	1953	34°18′36.14″S 148°18′18.64″E	
Young Public School	Young	Southern Tablelands	1861	34°19′16.52″S 148°17′27.16″E	
Yowie Bay Public School	Yowie Bay	Southern Sydney	1956	34°2′53.14″S 151°6′8.63″E	

== Z ==
Name	Suburb/Town	Region	Opened	Coordinates	Ref
Zig Zag Public School	Lithgow	Central West	1891	33°27′56.26″S 150°10′57.73″E	

== See also ==
Organisations

- Education in New South Wales
- New South Wales Education Standards Authority
- Education in Australia
- Australian Curriculum

Lists

- List of schools in New South Wales
- List of government schools in New South Wales
- List of non-government schools in New South Wales
- List of selective high schools in New South Wales
- List of Catholic schools in New South Wales
- List of Anglican schools in New South Wales
- List of Islamic schools in New South Wales
- Lists of schools in Australia
