= Palmwoods, New South Wales =

Palmwoods New South Wales
- Coordinates: 28°30′54″S 153°24′4″E
- Population: 104 (2016 census)
- Postcode(s): 2482
- LGA(s): Byron Shire
- State electorate(s): Ballina
- Federal division(s): Richmond

Palmwoods is a locality located in the Northern Rivers Region of New South Wales. It sits within the Byron Shire local government area and it is approximately 31 kilometres (19 mi) from the regional centre of Byron Bay. Its closet town is Mullumbimby, via Main Arm, which it is 13.5 kilometres (8.4 mi) from.

The traditional owners of this place are the Bundjalung (Arakwal) people.

It shares a name with Palmwoods, Queensland which it was named for.

== European history ==
Before 1926 the locality now known as Palmwoods was considered to be a part of Upper Main Arm until it was purchased by John Richard Hingston Gaggin (known as Richard) and his sister Arabella Annie Elizabeth Gaggin (known as May); both of whom had immigrated from Ireland. The siblings named their property for the location in Queensland as it was then one of the best fruit growing areas and they wanted to emulate it.

At their property they primarily grew bananas but also experimented with other crops which included being some of the first people in the region to farm macadamias and, from the 1930s, they began selling off and leasing sections of the land.

The Gaggin siblings both died and were buried at Palmwoods and in May Gaggins obituary in 1943 it stated that:

[Palmwoods] is probably the largest area of thriving banana plantations in one spot in New South Wales, the shaping of which from the primeval jungle began in 1926. With the exception of a few acres of grassland the whole tract was under dense scrub with not even a rudimentary road, and with bunchy top decimating all neighbouring plantations

— Obituary: Miss AAE Gaggin, The Northern Star, 16 March 1943
