= Mullumbimby Creek =

- Location within New South Wales

Location
- Country: Australia
- State: New South Wales
- Region: Northern Rivers
- Local government area: Byron Shire

Physical characteristics
- Mouth
  - coordinates: 28°33′11″S 153°29′48″E

Mullumbimby Creek is a perennial stream located in Northern Rivers region in the state of New South Wales, Australia. It is the namesake of the locality of the same name.

== See also ==
- Rivers of New South Wales
- List of rivers of New South Wales (A–K)
- List of rivers of Australia
