= Eureka, New South Wales =

Eureka
- Suburb
- Coordinates: 28°41′20″S 153°26′20″E
- Country: Australia
- State: New South Wales
- LGA: Byron Shire

Government
  - State electorate: Lismore
  - Federal division: Richmond

Population
  - Total: 353 (SAL 2021)

Eureka is a locality and village in the Byron Shire, in New South Wales, Australia and it is 27 kilometres (17 mi) from the regional centre of Byron Bay and is 4.4 kilometres (2.7 mi) south-west of the larger village of Federal. As of 2021, the population was 353.

The traditional owners of this place are the Bundjalung (Wiyabal) people.

== Origin of place name ==
This locality has been known by a number of names since Europeans first came there, including North Clunes, Whian and Purgatory (because of the number of ticks there). The current name of Eureka was popularised in 1883 after the opening of the Eureka Boarding House which, in 1885, became the Eureka Hotel. Despite this the other names did remain in periodic use.

There are two main theories of where the colonial name of Eureka came about with the first being that it was named after the locality of Eureka in New Zealand. Another prominent alternative that it was named after the first selector, an Englishman William Strong, lost the tree he had marked as a guide and exclaimed 'Eureka!' when he found it again.
