= Koonyum Range, New South Wales =

Koonyum Range New South Wales
- Coordinates: 28°32′33″S 153°24′48″E
- Population: 15 (2016 census)
- Postcode(s): 2482
- LGA(s): Byron Shire
- State electorate(s): Ballina
- Federal division(s): Richmond

Koonyum Range is a locality in the Northern Rivers Region of New South Wales which sits within the Koonyum Range. it is located in the Byron Shire local government area and is located 28.3 kilometres (17.6 mi) from the regional centre of Byron Bay and is 12.2 kilometres (7.6 mi) from Mullumbimby via Wilsons Creek.

The traditional owners of this area are the Arakwal people of the Bundjalung Nation.

The name Koonyum is probably derived from the Gidabal term "gunyin" for anus or "coonyum" for the buttocks.
