= Norco Co-operative =

Australian agricultural cooperative

Norco
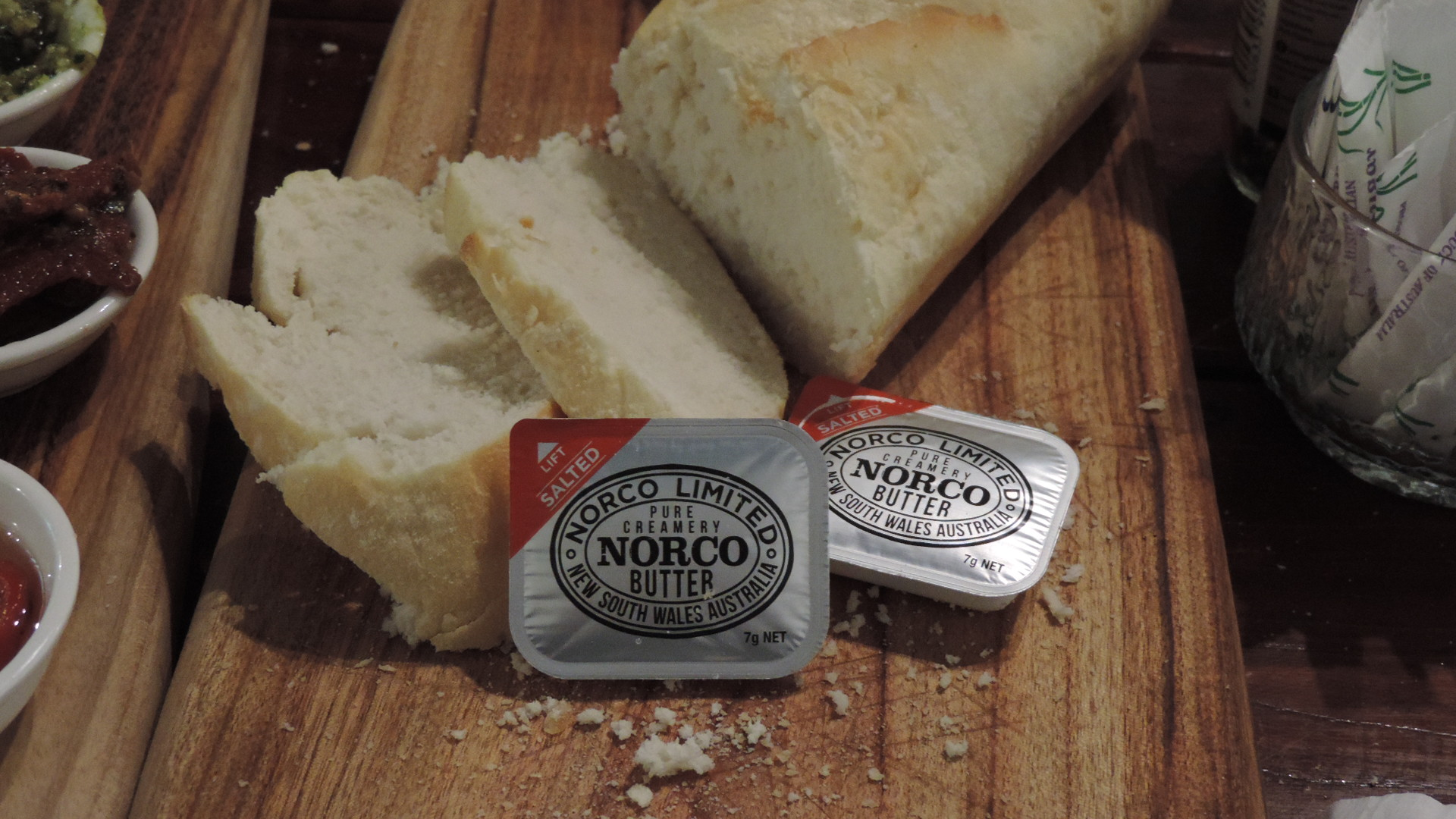
- Norco butter
- Company type: Dairy
- Industry: Dairy
- Founded: 5 June 1895
- Headquarters: Lismore, Australia
- Area served: New South Wales; Queensland
- Products: Milk, Cheese, Ice-Cream, Rural Products
- Revenue: $541 million
- Number of employees: 840+
- Website: norco.com.au

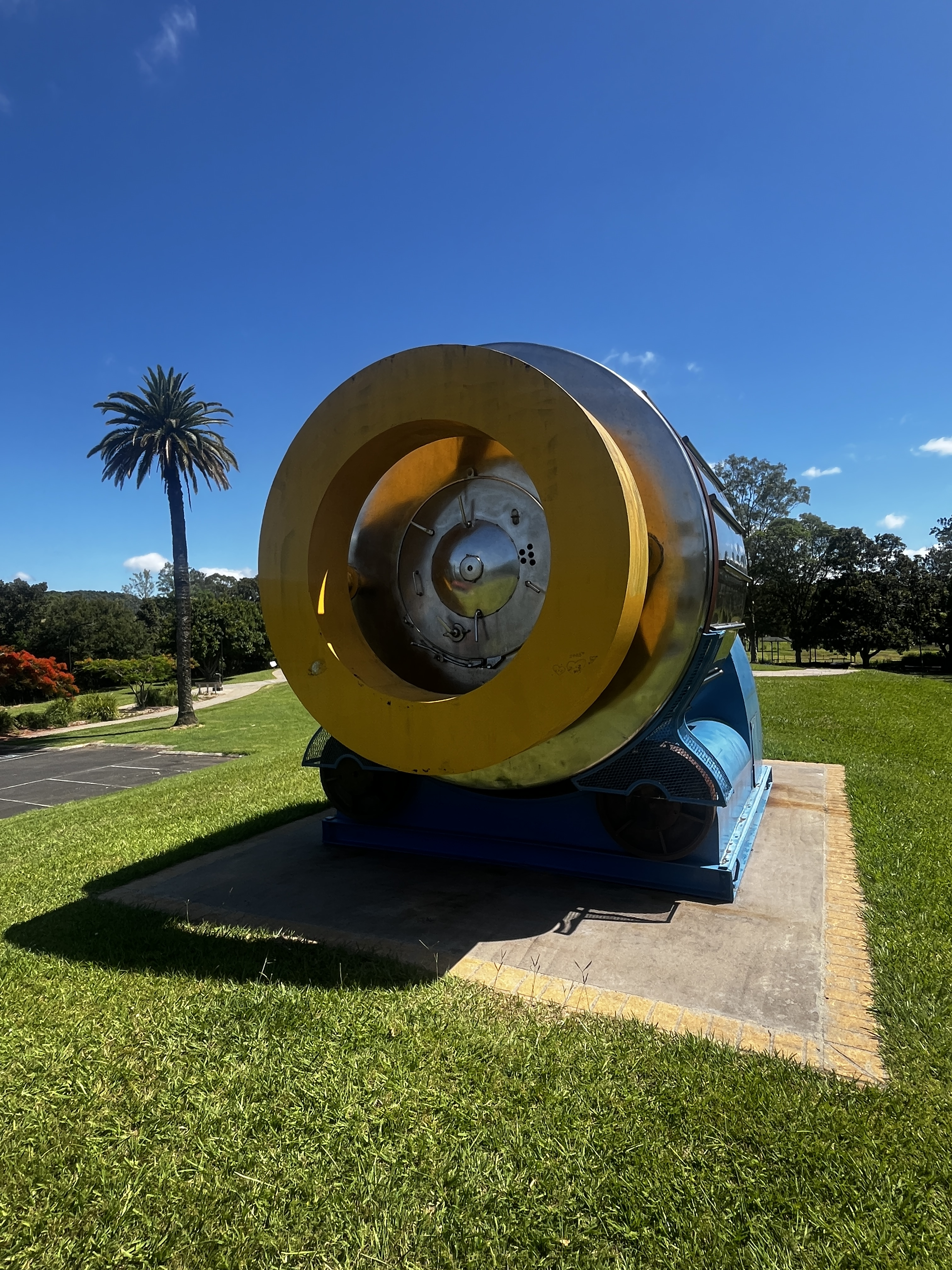
A 1962 NORCO stainless steel butter churn on display in Lismore, 2025

Norco Co-operative Limited is an agricultural supply and marketing co-operative based in the Northern Rivers region of New South Wales, Australia. Established in 1895, it sells dairy products and services locally and internationally. Its 200+ dairy farm members supply over 200 million litres of milk to its two milk bottling factories at Raleigh and Labrador, and to its ice cream factory in Lismore.

The dairy brands produced include "Norco", "FM", "Mighty Cool", "Real Iced Coffee" and "Tornado Shake". It also produces "home brand" milk and ice cream for Coles and Aldi, Harris Farm and has a milk export business in China.

== History ==
Norco was formed in 1895 by agreement of a number of Northern Rivers dairy companies including the Springs Hill Butter Factory, Woodburn Butter Factory, Rous Cooperative Dairy Company, Unara Factory, Rosevale Dairy Factory, Pearce's Creek Union Dairy Company Limited, Clunes Dairy Company, Tintenbar Creamery and a number of other smaller producers from throughout the region. Its founders were inspired by the Kiama Pioneer Butter Factory, a cooperative started in 1884, on the South Coast of New South Wales which lead to a number of other regions forming cooperatives.

The first meeting of what would become members of the cooperative was held on 5 December 1892 in Clunes and they originally called the company The North Coast Fresh Food and Cold Storage Cooperative Company Limited and later renamed themselves to the North Coast Cooperative Company.

In the 1920s Norco then also amalgamated with the smaller but similarly sized Lismore Cooperative Dairy Company Limited (formed in 1902) and smaller cooperatives from Alstonville, Ballina, Binna Burra, Coraki, Kyogle, Nimbin and Tweed Heads. They were formally renamed Norco Co-operative Limited in December 1925 and were, by the 1930s, supplying one third of NSW's butter.

World War II led to a significant disruption in the dairy industry and presented a number of challenges, including a lack of workforce, and many factories were closed during the war years and were, subsequently, not reopened. Two of the factories closed, although not until 1947, was the butter factories at Uki and Tyalgum which lead to community debate and concern regarding the future of dairy in the region.

By 1950 all but two of the smaller factories were closed and processing was focused on the major factories at Byron Bay as well as at Lismore and Murwillumbah. For most of its early history the head offices of Norco were located in Byron Bay until, in 1962, they were transferred to Lismore; which remains their current base.
