= Suffolk Park, New South Wales =

Suburb of Byron Shire, New South Wales, Australia

Coordinates: 28°41′S 153°37′E

Suffolk Park
- Suburb
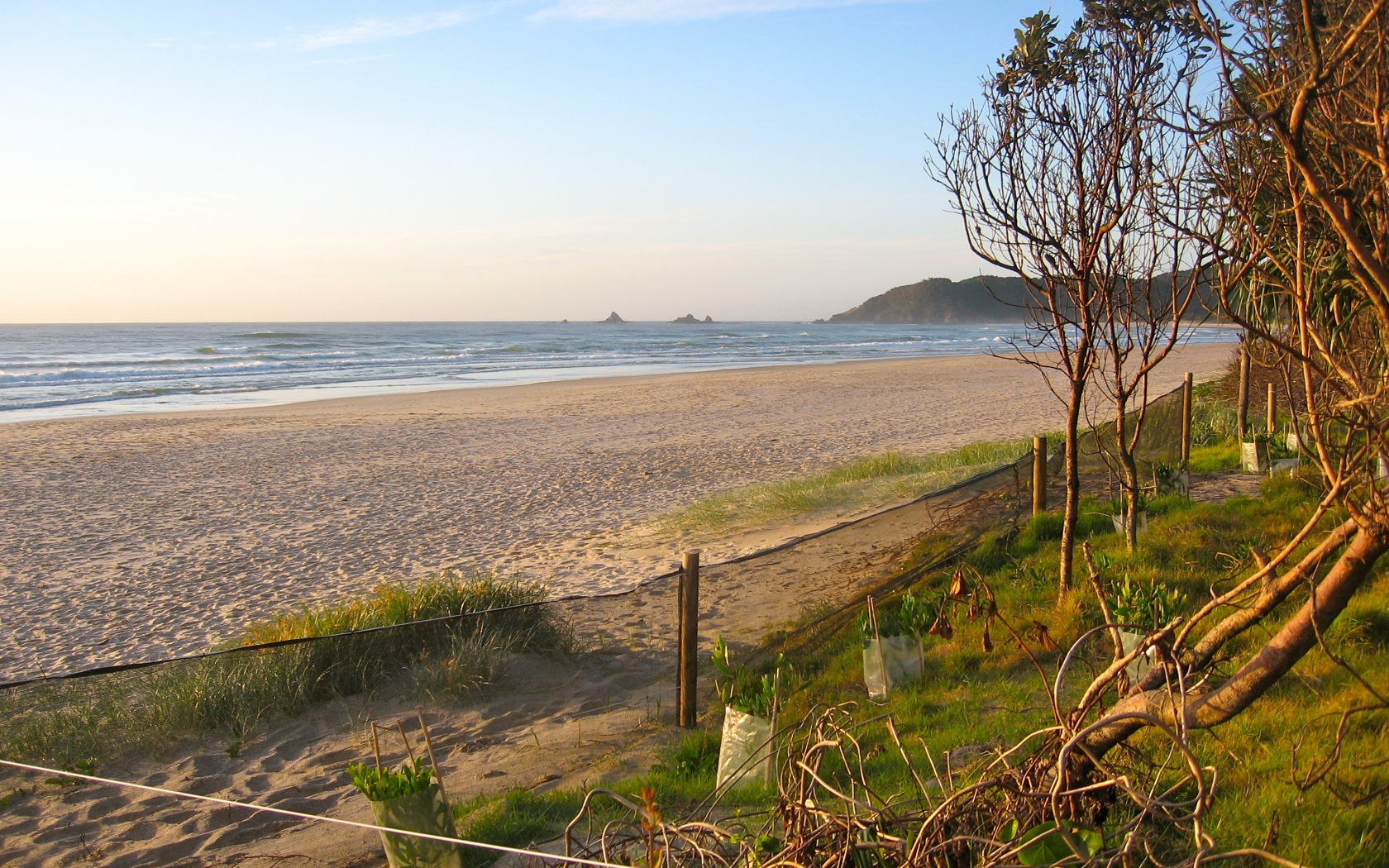
- View of Cocked Hat Rocks and Broken Head from Tallow Beach
- Country: Australia
- State: New South Wales
- LGA: Byron Shire

Government
  - State electorate: Ballina
  - Federal division: Richmond

Population
  - Total: 4,222 (2021 census)
- Postcode: 2481
Suburbs around Suffolk Park
Coopers Shoot	Byron Bay	Coral Sea
Coopers Shoot	Suffolk Park	Coral Sea
Coopers Shoot	Broken Head	Coral Sea

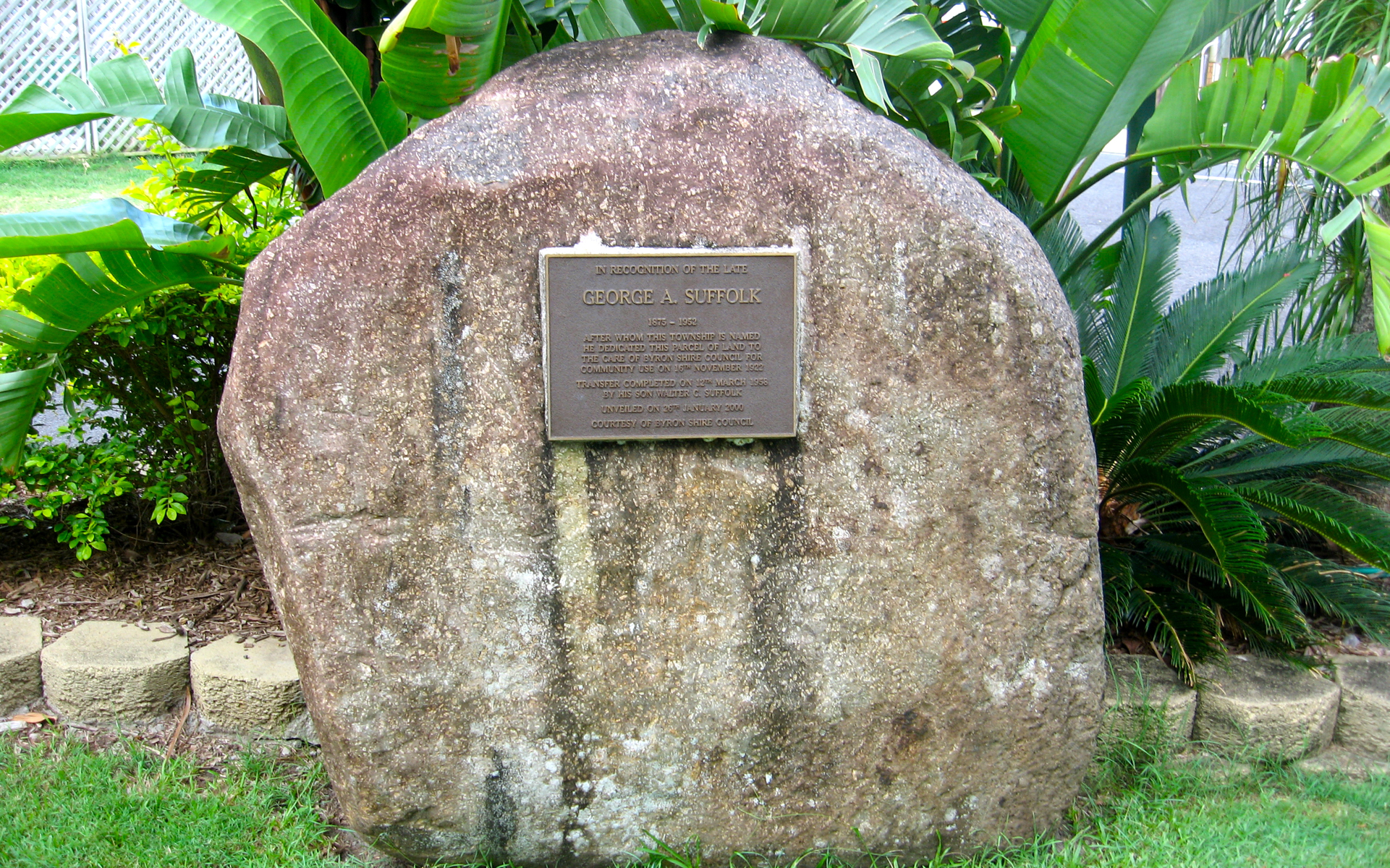
Commemorative plaque of George A. Suffolk.

Suffolk Park is a suburb of Byron Bay in the Byron Shire of the Northern Rivers region in New South Wales, Australia. It is 5 km south of Byron Bay. At the 2021 Census, its population was 4,222.

The town was named after George A. Suffolk (1876-1952) who dedicated a large parcel of land to the Byron Shire Council for community use on 16 November 1922. Suffolk Park has grown to a point of having its own identity. Situated just south of Cape Byron, Suffolk Park is a 10 minute drive from Byron Bay. Tallow Beach, which stretches 7.6 km from Cosy Corner at the Cape south to Broken Head, lies adjacent to the suburb.

== Streets ==
The main shops are located on Clifford Street. The beach runs parallel with Alcorn Street. Other notable streets are Armstrong Street and Brandon Street. Some residents of Alcorn Street were accused of appropriating Suffolk Park beach reserve into their backyards in 2008. Removal of native vegetation, private tracks to the beach and misleading signs had resulted in degradation of the coastal foreshore.

== Landmarks ==
Notable landmarks in the area are "Cocked-Hat Rocks" (a large rocky outcrop at the Broken Head beach), which are also known by traditional Bundjalung people as "Sister's Rocks", the Suffolk Park Caravan Park, and King's Beach.

== Facilities ==
There is a small shopping centre at the corner of Clifford Street and Broken Head Road that services Suffolk Park with a post office, liquor store, pub, newsagent, bakery, pharmacy, and a few restaurants and take-aways. Suffolk Park also features a small recreational area behind the fire station, Gaggin Park, through which entry to Tallow Beach is available.

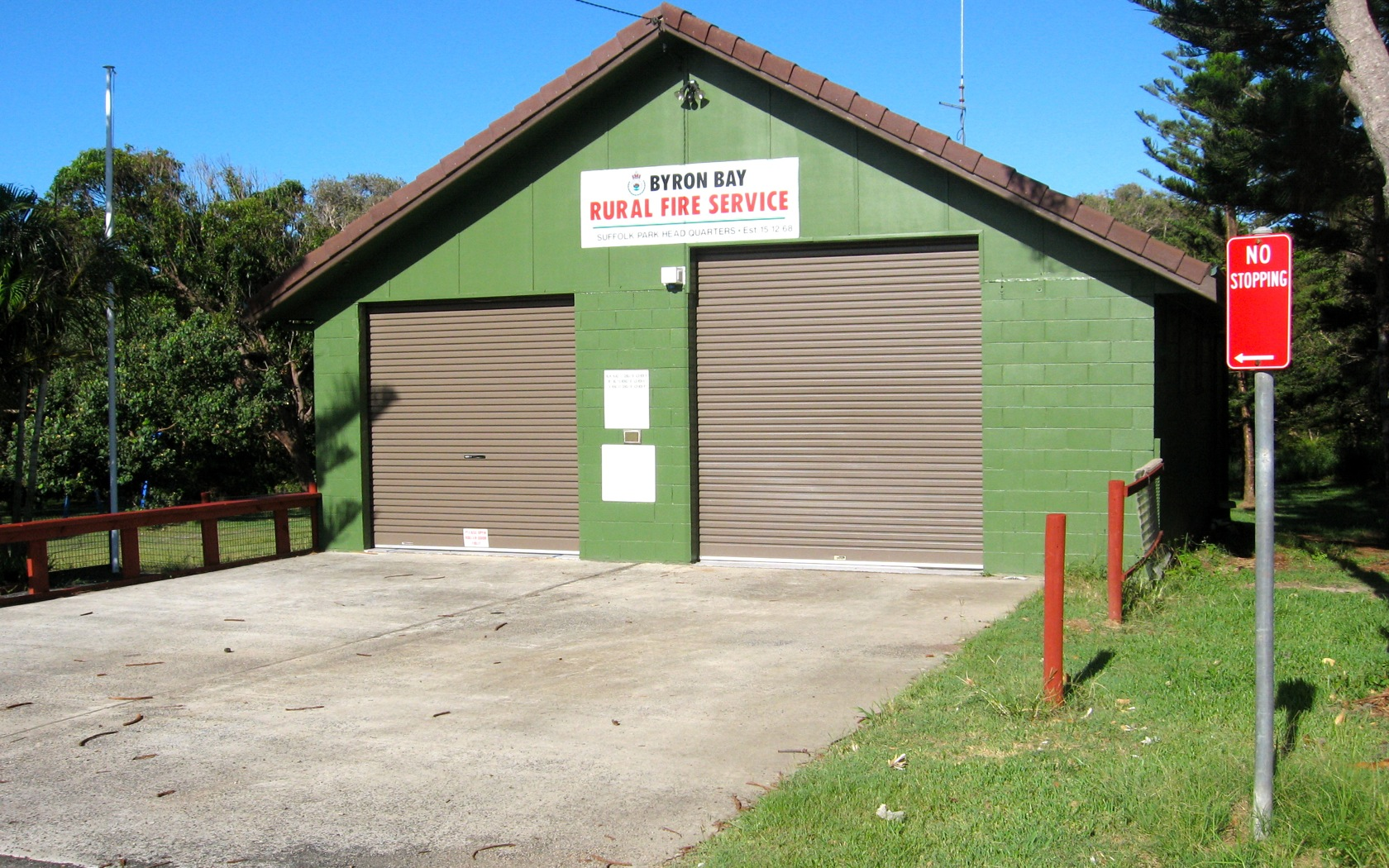
Suffolk Park Fire Station

== Sporting clubs ==
Suffolk Park Football Club formed in 2012. A few older players from the neighbouring Byron Bay FC Club decided they’d branch out on their own, forming Suffolk Park Phoenix FC. It is the first officially recognised sporting team for Suffolk Park. The home ground is in Beech Drive. In 2013, Suffolk Park FC won its first trophies as the Men's 3rd Division side won the pointscore (minor premiership) and Grand Final. In 2014 the Men's 2nd Division won the pointscore competition but lost the Grand Final on penalties. 2015 was the club's most successful season with all the club's senior teams making the Grand Final. The Men's 5th Division were both pointscore and Grand Final champions, defeating Dunoon 4–1. The Men's 1st Division team came from 3rd on the table to defeat Italo Stars in a penalty shootout after going through extra time at 0–0. The Women's 4th Division lost their Grand Final 3–0 to neighbouring Byron Bay. The club also had 3 junior miniroo teams in 2015 with a 6 years, a 7 years and an 11 years team. In 2019 the Men's Division 3 team won the pointscore (minor premiership) undefeated. As of 2025 the club is represented in junior, women’s and men’s competitions at Football Far North Coast.

== Suburbs ==
The geographic/political locality of Suffolk Park extends north to Byron Bay; west to encompass Baywood Chase and Byron Hills; and south to Broken Head however Baywood Chase and Byron Hills are often considered separate suburbs because of their size. They were planned construction and feature many cul-de-sacs, which are favourite settling spots for many young families with children.
