= Huonbrook, New South Wales =

Huonbrook
- Town
- Coordinates: 28°32′54″S 153°23′4″E
- Country: Australia
- State: New South Wales
- LGA: Byron Shire

Government
  - State electorate: Ballina
  - Federal division: Richmond

Population
  - Total: 150 (2016 census)
- Postcode: 2482

Huonbrook is a locality located in the Byron Shire of the Northern Rivers Region of New South Wales. It is approximately 33.7 kilometres (20.9 mi) from the regional centre of Byron Bay and the closest town is Mullumbimby which is 17.6 kilometres (10.9 mi) away.

The traditional owners of the Huonbrook area are the Bundjalung (Widjabul Wia-Bal) people.

== Origin of place name ==
Huonbrook was first colonised by Europeans in the early 1880s and the Bundjalung place name is not known. These colonists first called the area 'Upper Upper Cooper's Creek' (distinguishing it from Upper Coopers Creek) before local residents formed a progress association and named themselves the Kentore Progress Association which was later changed to Kintore which became the most commonly used place name.

In 1923 the name was changed to Huonbrook after a phone line was placed there and named this way; soon after, a post office constructed.
