= McLeods Shoot, New South Wales =

McLeods Shoot New South Wales
- Coordinates: 28°39′25″S 153°33′14″E
- Population: 102 (2016 census)
- Postcode(s): 2479
- LGA(s): Byron Shire
- State electorate(s): Ballina
- Federal division(s): Richmond

McLeods Shoot is a locality in the Northern Rivers Region of New South Wales and it sits within the Byron Shire local government area. it is approximately 9.4 kilometres (5.8 mi) from the regional centre of Byron Bay.

It is on the lands of the Bundjalung (Arakwal) people.

== Origin of place name ==
The name McLeods Shoot was first recorded on 21 October 1908 and it is believed to have been named for early settler and colonist Thomas McLeod. McLeod's Shoot, and the surrounding areas, where popular logging area (particularly for cedar) and shoot part of the name refers to steep areas and areas with cliffs were used to slide or roll logs down.
