= Mullumbimby Creek, New South Wales =

Mullumbimby Creek New South Wales
- Coordinates: 28°33′7″S 153°26′44″E
- Population: 548 (2016 census)
- Postcode(s): 2482
- LGA(s): Byron Shire
- State electorate(s): Ballina
- Federal division(s): Richmond

Mullumbimby Creek is a small town located in the Northern Rivers Region of New South Wales and it is located in the Byron Shire local government area and is approximately 25.3 kilometres (15.7 mi) from the regional centre of Byron Bay. The closest town is Mullumbimby which is 6.6 kilometres (4.1 mi) away.

The traditional owners of this place are the Bundjalung (Arakwal) people.

It shares its name with Mullumbimby Creek which runs through it.
