= Skinners Shoot, New South Wales =

Coordinates: 28°39′55″S 153°35′05″E

Skinners Shoot
- Town
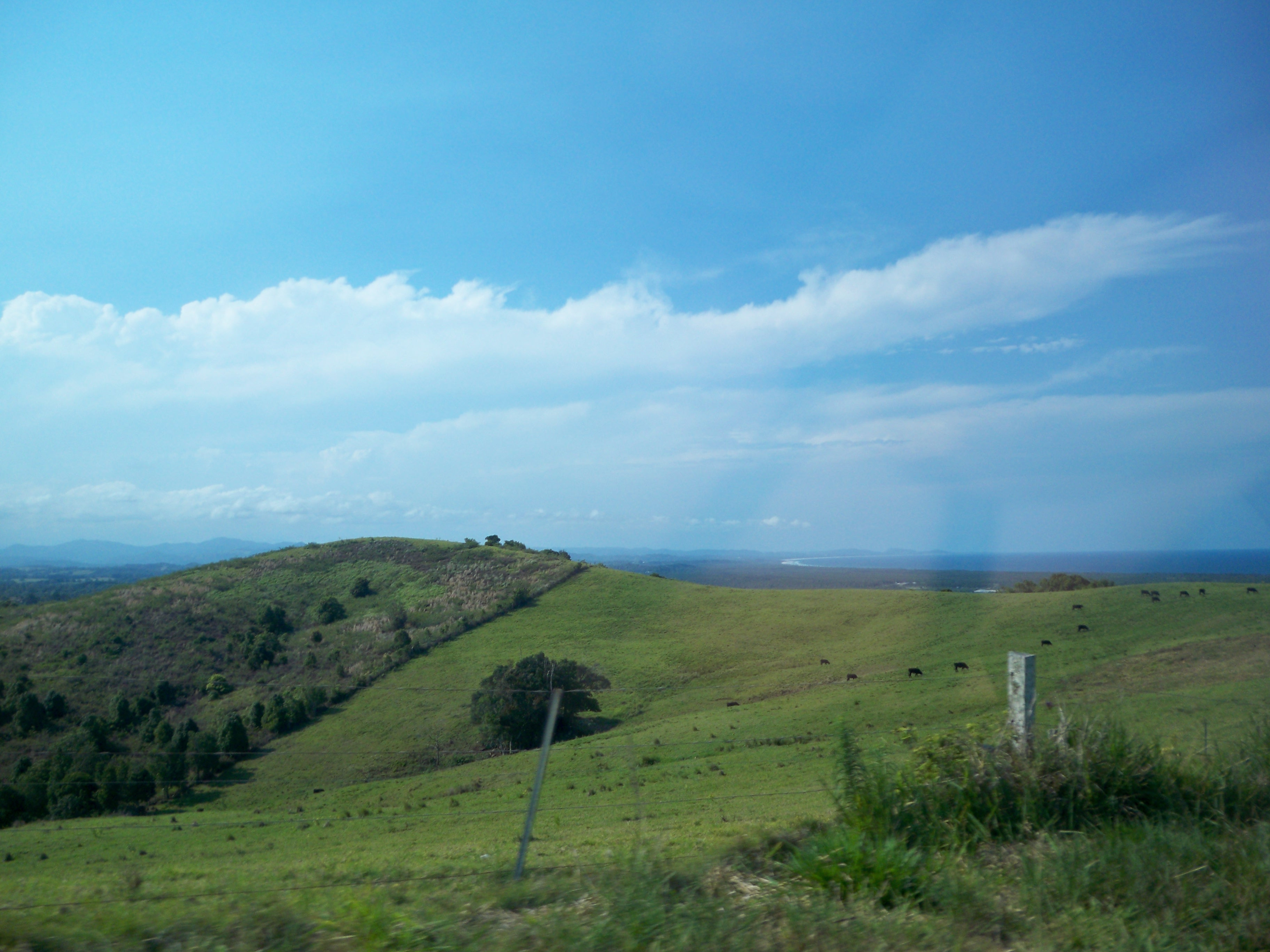
- Looking north from Bangalow Road to Skinners Shoot
- Country: Australia
- State: New South Wales
- Region: Northern Rivers
- LGA: Byron Shire
- Location: 777 km (483 mi) N of Sydney; 169 km (105 mi) S of Brisbane; 4 km (2.5 mi) SE of Byron Bay; 18 km (11 mi) NE of Bangalow

Government
  - State electorate: Ballina
  - Federal division: Richmond

Population
  - Total: 275 (2006 census)

Skinners Shoot is a southern suburb of Byron Bay in the Northern Rivers region of New South Wales, Australia. In 2021, Skinners Shoot had a population of 130 people.
