= Rural Landsharing Communities =

Rural Landsharing Communities, often referred to as RLCs, are common, although not unique to the Northern Rivers region of New South Wales. They forms of intentional communities which are a popular and common way to provide housing for people that may not otherwise be able to afford it. These RLCs mean that multiple people, or families, share a single rural lot, with each having the right to build a dwelling, often through cooperative legal structures like company title, trusts, or cooperatives.

These intentional communities are characterised as being formed by people with a common interest and can vary in form significantly but are generally divided into three major forms: multiple occupancy, community title and ecovillages.

== History ==
Rural Landsharing Communities first developed in the Northern Rivers in the 1970s and were technically illegal, until 1998, with the passing of the New South Wales governments State Environmental Planning Policy (Number 15): Rural Landsharing Communities.

They first originated after the 1973 Aquarius Festival, in Nimbin, when groups of 'hippies' travelled to the region and formed the Tuntable Falls Co-Coordination Co-operative which formed the Tuntable Falls Community. It was the first of its kind and, together, they acquired 486 hectares (1,200 acres) for $100,000 and sold shares in the land for $200 each. This community is still an active one.

Since this time more than 60 rural landsharing communities, varying in size, have been created in the Northern Rivers region and they are also growing in popularity in other parts of Australia.

== Types ==
=== Multiple Occupancy ===
Multiple occupancies are often referred to as MOs and they are a form of rural development in which a group of people, that are not necessarily related to each other, live on a shared rural block in different dwellings on the land and reduce development costs. They share one title and people who hold property within a multiple occupancy are considered shareholders; for this reason it is often not possible to apply for a mortgage to purchase a share.

Many MOs were also developed before the change to the development laws in 1998 and many of the houses and other dwellings constructed were not subject to planning approvals and were often constructed by individuals and communities in a DIY manner.

Many of these houses were inspired and guided by architect Col James who had attended, and led students to, the Aquarius Festival in Nimbin and promoted the ideals of MOs as a part of his motto to “make housing a verb.” In 1983 James published Low Cost Country Home Building, "a self-help book for people wanting to build simple houses in rural areas".

Often within MOs there is shared property where no one shareholder holds a claim to.

There are a high concentration of MOs in the following areas of the Northern Rivers:

- Main Arm
- Nimbin
- Uki

=== Community Title ===
Community Titles, often referred to as CTs, are similar to multiple occupancies with a major difference is that each individual lot has a separate title and then shares any 'unallocated' land as tenants in common. As each property within the community title holds a title it is possible to apply for a mortgage for these properties.

In 2026 many multiple occupancies are transitioning to become community titles.

=== Ecovillages ===
Ecovillages are becoming increasingly popular around the world and also in Australia and the Northern Rivers. They are subdivisions in which community, sustainability and ecology are prioritised.
