= Hayters Hill, New South Wales =

Hayters Hill New South Wales
- Coordinates: 28°40′25″S 153°35′6″E
- Population: 27 (2016 census)
- Postcode(s): 2481
- LGA(s): Byron Shire
- State electorate(s): Ballina
- Federal division(s): Richmond

Hayters Hill is a southern suburb of Byron Bay, located in the Northern Rivers Region of New South Wales.
