= Coorabell =

- Town
- Coordinates: 28.6393°S 153.4921°E
- Country: Australia
- State: New South Wales
- LGA: Byron Shire

Government
  - State electorate: Ballina
  - Federal division: Richmond

Population
  - Total: 420 (2016 census)
- Postcode: 2479

Coorabell is a locality in the Northern Rivers Region of New South Wales. It sits within the Byron Shire local government area and is 16.4 kilometres (10.2 mi) from the regional centre of Byron Bay.

The traditional owners of this place are the Bundjalung (Arakwal) people.

== Origin of place name ==
The name Coorabell is derived from the Bundjalung language word 'Coorabil' or 'Goorangbil' which means hoop pine trees. It is alternatively suggested that the world 'Coorabil' means bladey grass.

The name Coorabell was first recorded in The Northern Star (as Coorabel Creek) on 5 March 1887 advising that church services would now be performed there.

== History ==
The land was first cleared for selectors in 1882 and Thomas Temperley acquired most of the area. By the mid-1880s in was a major staging post on the Lismore to Brunswick Road and, to accommodate people travelling through, Temperely built a boarding house which was later following by a number of stores, a Methodist Church and a school.

The school later became the Coorabell Hall which burnt down in 1918 and was rebuilt, in a different location in 1920 and it remains in use by the community.
