= Wanganui, New South Wales =

Wanganui
- Town
- Coordinates: 28°33′50″S 153°22′49″E
- Country: Australia
- State: New South Wales
- LGA: Byron Shire

Government
  - State electorate: Ballina
  - Federal division: Richmond

Population
  - Total: 51 (2021 census)
- Postcode: 2482

Wanganui is a locality located in the Northern Rivers Region of New South Wales.

In the 2021 Australian Census, it was recorded to have a population of approximately 51. The indigenous people of Wanganui are the Bundjalung.
