= Middle Pocket, New South Wales =

Middle Pocket New South Wales
- Coordinates: 28°29′17″S 153°28′7″E
- Population: 138 (2016 census)
- Postcode(s): 2482
- LGA(s): Byron Shire
- State electorate(s): Ballina
- Federal division(s): Richmond

Middle Pocket is a locality located in the Northern Rivers Region of New South Wales.
