= Talofa, New South Wales =

Talofa New South Wales
- Coordinates: 28°40′12″S 153°33′22″E
- Population: 110 (2016 census)
- Postcode(s): 2479
- LGA(s): Byron Shire
- State electorate(s): Ballina
- Federal division(s): Richmond

Talofa is a locality located in the Northern Rivers Region of New South Wales.
