= 2024 Byron Shire Council election =

Election in Byron Shire, Australia

- 14 September 2024

All 9 seats on Byron Shire Council 5 seats needed for a majority
- Registered: 27,485
- Mayor
- Turnout: 71.4%
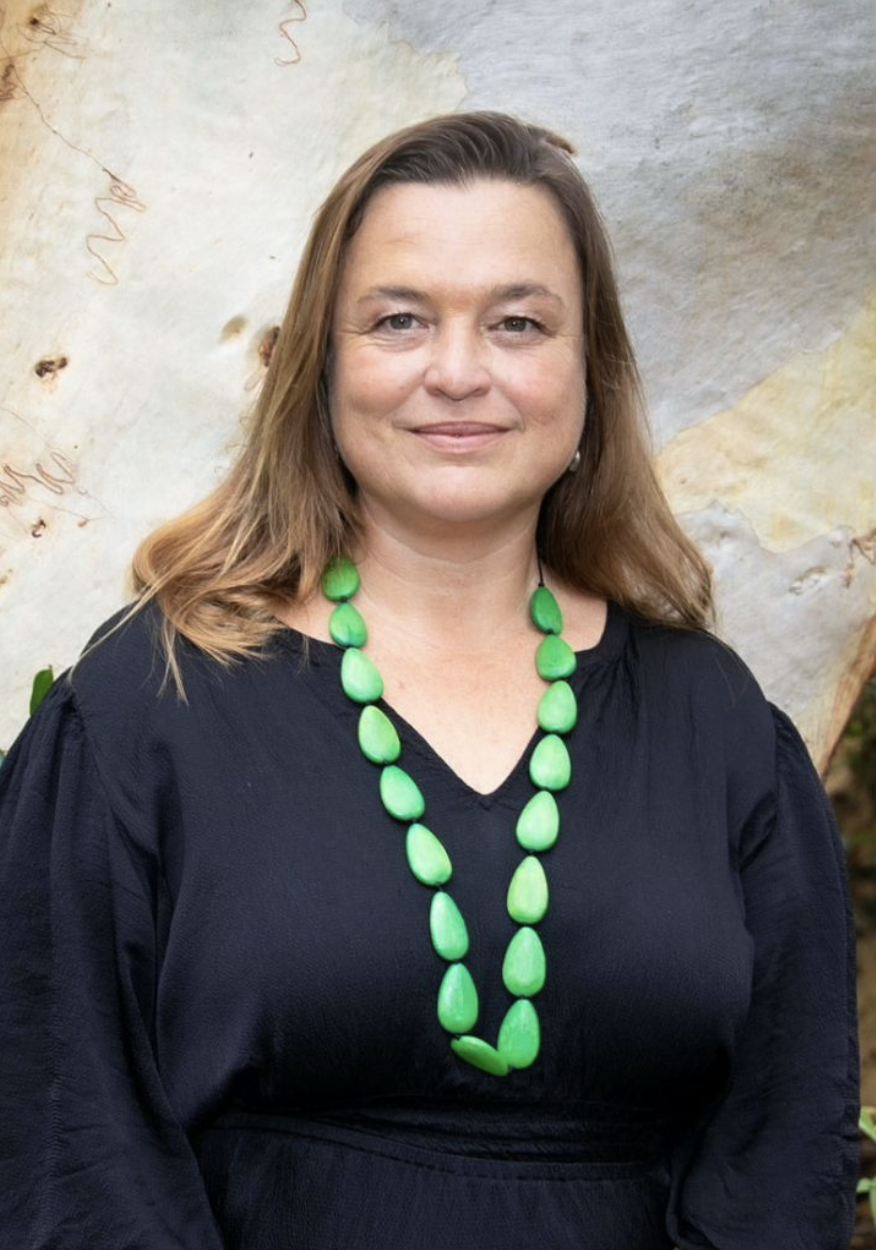

	First party	Second party
Candidate	Sarah Ndiaye	Asren Pugh
Party	Greens	Labor
Primary vote	6,522	5,666
Percentage	34.7%	30.1%
Swing	▲20.0	▲18.5
TCP	51.8%	48.2%
TCP swing	▲51.8	▲48.2
Mayor before election
Michael Lyon
Byron Independents
Elected Mayor
Sarah Ndiaye
Greens
- Councillors
Party	Leader	Vote %	Seats	+/–
Greens	Sarah Ndiaye	36.7	3	+1
Labor	Asren Pugh	27.1	2	+1
Compass	David Warth	13.6	1	+1
Byron Inds	Michael Lyon	13.6	1	−1
Bright Future	Jack Dods	9.6	1	+1
This lists parties that won seats. See the complete results below.

The 2024 Byron Shire Council election was held on 14 September 2024 to elect eight councillors and the mayor of Byron Shire. The election was held as part of the statewide local government elections in New South Wales, Australia.

Incumbent mayor Michael Lyon sought re-election to a second term but was defeated, placing 4th by first preference votes. He retained his council seat, which he has held since 2016.

== Background ==
Three weeks before the election, incumbent mayor Michael Lyon was charged with assault and stalking after an alleged domestic violence incident. Lyon secured an interim suppression order to stop the media reporting on the case on August 19, on the basis that publicity could harm the alleged victim, but he failed to secure a permanent suppression order in Tweed Heads Local Court in late August after objections from the Sydney Morning Herald and other media outlets.

Following the charges, Mark Swivel and Meredith Wray withdrew as candidates for Lyon's "Byron Independents" group. Swivel joined the Labor Party, while Wray joined the "Bright Future Byron" group.

== Electoral system ==
Like in all other New South Wales local government areas, Byron Shire Council elections use optional preferential voting. Under this system, voters are only required to vote for one candidate or group, although they can choose to preference other candidates.

All elections for councillor positions are elected using proportional representation. Sydney is an undivided council and uses an Australian Senate-style ballot paper with above-the-line and below-the-line voting.

Voting is compulsory for anyone on the New South Wales state electoral roll.

== Candidates ==
=== Mayoral candidates ===
Candidates are listed in the order they appeared on the ballot.

Party	Candidate	Background
Byron Shire Compass	David Warth	Filmmaker
Greens	Sarah Ndiaye	Byron deputy mayor since 2022
Labor	Asren Pugh	Byron councillor since 2021
Byron Independents	Michael Lyon	Byron mayor since 2021

=== Councillor candidates ===
Labor (Group A)	Byron Shire Compass (Group B)	Byron Independents (Group C)
1. Asren Pugh; 2. Janet Swain; 3. Mark Swivel; 4. Peter Doherty; 5. Diana James; 6. Linda Watson	1. David Warth; 2. Susie Figgis; 3. Nyck Jeanes; 4. Trisha Gizas-Barker	1. Michael Lyon; 2. Max Foggon; 3. Rhett Holt; 4. Jeannette Martin
Greens (Group D)	Bright Future Byron (Group D)	Ungrouped
1. Sarah Ndiaye; 2. Elia Hauge; 3. Delta Kay; 4. Michelle Lowe; 5. Nell Schofield	1. Jack Dods; 2. David Michie; 3. Meredith Wray; 4. Niamh Dove	Lucy Vader

== Results ==
=== Mayoral results ===
2024 Byron Shire Council election: Mayor
Party	Candidate	Votes	%	±%
Greens	Sarah Ndiaye	6,522	34.7	+20.0
Labor	Asren Pugh	5,666	30.1	+18.5
Byron Shire Compass	David Warth	3,481	18.5	+18.5
Byron Independents	Michael Lyon	3,128	16.6	−7.1
Total formal votes		18,797	95.7	
Informal votes		839	4.3	
Turnout		19,636	71.4	
Two-candidate-preferred result
Greens	Sarah Ndiaye	7,582	51.8	+51.8
Labor	Asren Pugh	7,051	48.2	+48.2
Greens gain from Byron Independents				

=== Councillor results ===
2024 Byron Shire Council election
Party	Candidate	Votes	%	±%
Greens	1. Sarah Ndiaye; 2. Elia Hauge (elected 1); 3. Delta Kay (elected 5); 4. Michelle Lowe (elected 7); 5. Nell Schofield	6,772	36.7	+15.2
Labor	1. Asren Pugh (elected 2); 2. Janet Swain (elected 6); 3. Mark Swivel; 4. Peter Doherty; 5. Diana James; 6. Linda Watson	5,001	27.1	+13.7
Byron Shire Compass	1. David Warth (elected 3); 2. Susie Figgis; 3. Nyck Jeanes; 4. Trisha Gizas-Barker	2,503	13.6	+13.6
Byron Independents	1. Michael Lyon (elected 4); 2. Max Foggon; 3. Rhett Holt; 4. Jeannette Martin	2,161	11.7	−8.8
Bright Future Byron	1. Jack Dods (elected 8); 2. David Michie; 3. Meredith Wray; 4. Niamh Dove	1,765	9.6	+9.6
Independent	Lucy Vader	240	1.3	+1.3
Total formal votes		18,442	94.0	
Informal votes		1,181	6.0	
Turnout		19,623	71.4	
