= Possum Creek, New South Wales =

Possum Creek New South Wales
- Coordinates: 28°40′13″S 153°29′36″E
- Population: 277
- Postcode(s): 2479
- LGA(s): Byron Shire
- State electorate(s): Ballina
- Federal division(s): Richmond

Possum Creek is a locality located in the Northern Rivers Region of New South Wales and it is 15 kilometres (9.3 mi) from the regional centre of Byron Bay and it sits within the Byron Shire local government area. In the 2021 census it had a population of 277 people.

The traditional owners of this area are the Bundjalung people.
