= Myocum, New South Wales =

Myocum New South Wales
- Coordinates: 28°35′37″S 153°30′5″E
- Population: 985 (2016 census)
- Postcode(s): 2481
- LGA(s): Byron Shire
- State electorate(s): Ballina
- Federal division(s): Richmond

Myocum is a small town located in the Northern Rivers Region of New South Wales. It is located in the Byron Shire local government area and it is approximately 17 kilometres (11 mi) from the regional centre of Byron Bay.

It is on the lands of the Arakwal of the Bundjalung people who are its traditional owners.

== History ==
The name Myocum is possibly taken from the word 'myloogun' (sunrise) or 'mooloogin' (dawn) from one of the Yugambeh–Bundjalung languages.

Myocum was once home to the Myocum Railway Station, which was an unattended platform on the Murwillumbah railway line. It was opened on 20 February 1897 and closed on 30 June 1974.
