= The Pocket, New South Wales =

The Pocket
- Town
- Coordinates: 28°29′57″S 153°29′02″E
- Country: Australia
- State: New South Wales
- LGA: Byron Shire
- Location: 780 km (480 mi) from Sydney; 147 km (91 mi) from Brisbane; 28 km (17 mi) from Byron Bay

Government
  - State electorate: Ballina
  - Federal division: Richmond
- Elevation: 21 m (69 ft)

Population
  - Total: 231 (2021 census)
- Postcode: 2483
- Mean max temp: 23.7 °C (74.7 °F)
- Mean min temp: 16.5 °C (61.7 °F)
- Annual rainfall: 1,723.5 mm (67.85 in)

The Pocket is a locality in New South Wales, Australia. It is a village surrounded by foothills. There is a local tennis court and school. The Pocket is subject to flooding because of its placement in a catchment and the series of creeks which flows through the area. At the 2021 census, The Pocket had a population of 231 people.

== Climate ==
The Pocket has mild climate with few frosts in winter and wet winters.

== Name ==
The Pocket is so named because of the village's placement between the hills. Some hills around The Pocket are as high as 400m. To the west of The Pocket are the Mount Jerusalem ranges which climb to around 700m.
