= Byron Shire =

Local government area in New South Wales, Australia

- Local government area
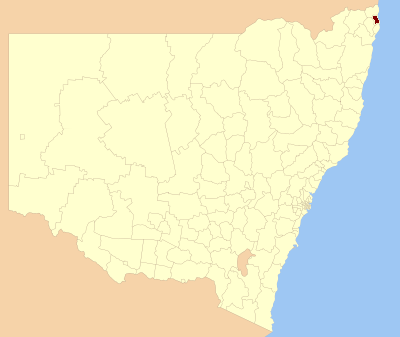
- Location in New South Wales

- Interactive map of Byron Shire
- Coordinates: 28°33′S 153°30′E
- Country: Australia
- State: New South Wales
- Region: Northern Rivers
- Established: 7 March 1906
- Council seat: Mullumbimby

Government
  - Mayor: Sarah Ndiaye
  - State electorate: Ballina
  - Federal division: Richmond

Area
  - Total: 566.7 km^{2} (218.8 sq mi)

Population
  - Totals: 31,556 (2016 census); 34,574 (2018 est.)
  - Density: 55.684/km^{2} (144.220/sq mi)
- Website: Byron Shire
LGAs around Byron Shire
| Tweed | Tweed | Coral Sea (Pacific Ocean) |
| Lismore | Byron Shire | Coral Sea (Pacific Ocean) |
| Lismore | Ballina | Coral Sea (Pacific Ocean) |

Byron Shire is a local government area located in the Northern Rivers region of New South Wales, Australia. The shire is located adjacent to the Coral Sea about 50 kilometres (31 mi) south of the Queensland border. The shire, administered from the town of Mullumbimby, covers an area of 566.7 square kilometres (218.8 sq mi), and has existed as a local government entity since 1906. The shire was named for Cape Byron, itself named by Captain James Cook in May 1770 in honour of Vice-Admiral John Byron.

Sarah Ndiaye of the Greens has served as Mayor since 2024.

== History ==
Byron Shire was created on 7 March 1906 under the Shires Act 1906 (NSW) as one of 134 local government areas in regional New South Wales. On 16 May 1906, a temporary council of five members was appointed to administer it, and elections were held in November. On 4 December, the council convened for the first time with William Baker as its inaugural president. William Baker was born in Great Stanmore, England. His cousin, Alfred Joseph Baker was the first person to score a goal in international football against Scotland in 1870.

On 1 July 1908, the Mullumbimby Municipality was created out of part of Byron. On 1 October 1980, the municipality and the shire were re-amalgamated by direction of the NSW Minister for Local Government.

== Heritage listings ==
The Byron Shire has a number of heritage-listed sites, including:

- High Conservation Value Old Growth forest

== Towns and localities ==
Byron (SE)

- Byron Bay
- Bangalow
- Broken Head
- Coopers Shoot
- Ewingsdale
- Hayters Hill
- McLeods Shoot
- Newrybar (shared with Ballina)
- Skinners Shoot
- Suffolk Park
- Talofa
- Tyagarah

Mullumbimby/Brunswick (NE)

- Mullumbimby
- Brunswick Heads
- Billinudgel
- Crabbes Creek
- Montecollum
- Mullumbimby Creek
- Myocum
- New Brighton
- Ocean Shores
- South Golden Beach
- The Pocket
- Wilsons Creek
- Wooyung (shared with Tweed)
- Yelgun

Other (W)

- Binna Burra
- Booyong (shared with Lismore)
- Coorabell
- Eureka
- Federal
- Goonengerry
- Huonbrook
- Koonyum Range
- Main Arm
- Middle Pocket
- Nashua
- Palmwoods
- Possum Creek
- Upper Coopers Creek
- Upper Main Arm
- Upper Wilsons Creek
- Wanganui

== Demographics ==
In the 2021 census, there were 36,116 people in the Byron local government area, of these 47.9 per cent were male and 52.1 per cent were female. Aboriginal and Torres Strait Islander people made up 1.9 per cent of the population, which is lower than the national average of 3.2 per cent and lower than the NSW state average of 3.4 per cent. The median age of people in the Byron Shire area is 43 years (down from 44 in the 2016 census) which was slightly higher than the national median of 38 years. The ABS records marital status in everyone over the age of 15, in the Byron Shire 35.1 per cent of the population is married, whilst 15.9 per cent are divorced or separated, significantly more separated and divorced than the Australian average of 12 per cent.

Between 2011 and 2016 the population of the Byron Shire area increased 8 percent, this was a significant increase compared to the population growth between the 2006 and 2011 census which was 1.54 per cent. Whilst the growth since 2011 is similar to the Australian population growth on 8.8 percent, the growth in previous years, negative 0.51 per cent in 2001 to 2006 and 1.54 per cent in 2006 to 2011, is vastly different from the total population growth. This data suggests that Byron Shire's population is growing at an increasing rate much like the majority of Australia. Byron Shire has an average of 2.4 people per dwelling, the same as in the 2011 census, and on average there are 1.8 motor vehicles per dwelling. In terms of median income Byron Shire lags behind the Australian average, with the median personal income in Byron Shire being $596 and the Australian median income being $662. The gap is even larger in the median household income bracket grouping with the Australian national median being $1438 compared to Byron Shire's $1149.

In 2016, a large proportion of Byron Shire residents were born in Australia with 68.4 per cent of the population, 52 percent of the population have had both parents born in Australia, meaning less than half the population were first generation Australian or a migrant. The second largest country of origin was England with only 5.1 per cent, this reflects the diversity of those that aren't Australian born. Religion in Byron Shire was substantially different compared to the Australian population as a whole, 46.3 per cent of the Byron Shire population listed 'No Religion' in their 2016 census compared with only 25.1 per cent Australian wide. A total of 12.5 per cent of Byron Shire identified as Catholic contrasted to 24.7 per cent of Australia's population. The Byron Shire area had a significantly lower proportion of houses where two or more languages are spoken at 9 per cent compared to the national amount of 26.5. The vast majority of houses in Byron Shire, 81.1, spoke only English at home in the 2016 census, whereas 68.5 of houses Australia wide only spoke English at home.

Selected historical census data for the Byron Shire local government area
| Census year | | 1976 | 1981 | 1986 | 1991 | 1996 | 2001 | 2006 | 2011 | 2016 |
|---|---|---|---|---|---|---|---|---|---|---|
| Population | Estimated residents on census night | 10,916 | ▲15,426 | ▲18,342 | ▲22,599 | ▲27,007 | ▲28,916 | ▼28,766 | ▲29,209 | ▲31,556 |
| Population | LGA rank in terms of size within New South Wales | | | | | | | | 61st | ▲58th |
| Population | % of New South Wales population | | | | | | | | 0.42% | 0.42% |
| Population | % of Australian population | | | | | | 0.15% | ▼0.14% | 0.14% | ▼0.13% |
| Cultural and language diversity | | | | | | | | | | |
| Ancestry, top responses | English | | | | | | | | 29.7% | ▼27.9% |
| Ancestry, top responses | Australian | | | | | | | | 25.7% | ▼24.1% |
| Ancestry, top responses | Irish | | | | | | | | 11.2% | ▼10.5% |
| Ancestry, top responses | Scottish | | | | | | | | 8.2% | ▼8.0% |
| Ancestry, top responses | German | | | | | | | | 4.0% | ▼3.8% |
| Language, top responses (other than English) | German | | | | | | 1.0% | ▲1.1% | 1.1% | ▼1.0% |
| Language, top responses (other than English) | French | | | | | | 0.5% | 0.5% | ▲0.7% | 0.7% |
| Language, top responses (other than English) | Hebrew | | | | | | n/a | ▲0.4% | ▲0.6% | 0.6% |
| Language, top responses (other than English) | Italian | | | | | | 0.3% | ▲0.4% | ▲0.5% | ▲0.6% |
| Language, top responses (other than English) | Spanish | | | | | | n/c | ▲0.3% | ▲0.4% | ▲0.6% |
| Religious affiliation | | | | | | | | | | |
| Religious affiliation, top responses | No Religion | | | | | | 24.4% | ▲30.0% | ▲37.6% | ▲46.3% |
| Religious affiliation, top responses | Catholic | | | | | | 18.0% | ▼16.6% | ▼15.9% | ▼12.5% |
| Religious affiliation, top responses | Anglican | | | | | | 19.0% | ▼15.7% | ▼14.0% | ▼9.7% |
| Religious affiliation, top responses | Uniting Church | | | | | | 5.9% | ▼4.8% | ▼3.9% | ▼2.8% |
| Religious affiliation, top responses | Buddhism | | | | | | n/c | n/c | ▲3.6% | n/c |
| Median weekly incomes | | | | | | | | | | |
| Personal income | Median weekly personal income | | | | | | | A$383 | A$477 | A$596 |
| Personal income | % of Australian median income | | | | | | | 82.2% | ▲82.7% | ▲89.7% |
| Family income | Median weekly family income | | | | | | | A$932 | A$1,053 | A$1389 |
| Family income | % of Australian median income | | | | | | | 79.6% | ▼71.1% | ▲77.6% |
| Household income | Median weekly household income | | | | | | | A$738 | A$885 | A$1149 |
| Household income | % of Australian median income | | | | | | | 71.9% | ▼71.7% | ▲77.3% |

=== Population ===
The table below gives a picture of the estimated resident population as at the census night. Between 1911 and 1966, data was sourced from the New South Wales Statistical Register, covering the Byron Shire and Mullumbimby Municipality. Since 1976, data was sourced from the Australian Bureau of Statistics for the merged Byron Shire.

Estimated resident population
| Year | Byron Shire | Mullumbimby Municipality | Total | Notes |
|---|---|---|---|---|
| 1911 | 6,553 | 951 | 7,504 | |
| 1921 | 8,299 | 1,329 | 9,628 | |
| 1933 | 7,967 | 1,362 | 9,329 | |
| 1947 | 8,784 | 1,609 | 10,393 | |
| 1954 | 8,904 | 2,017 | 10,921 | |
| 1961 | 8,505 | 1,964 | 10,469 | |
| 1966 | 7,972 | 1,981 | 9,953 | |

== Council ==
Byron Shire Council

Type
- Type: Unicameral

Leadership
- Mayor: Sarah Ndiaye, Greens
- Deputy Mayor: Jack Dods, Independent
- Seats: Nine councillors, including a directly-elected mayor

Elections
- Last election: 14 September 2024
- Next election: 9 September 2028

=== Current composition and election method ===
Byron Shire Council is composed of nine councillors, including the mayor, for a fixed four-year term of office. The mayor is directly elected, while the eight other councillors are elected proportionally to a single ward.

The most recent election was held on 14 September 2024, and the makeup of the council (including the mayor) is as follows:

| Party | Councillors |
|---|---|
| Greens | 4 |
| Labor | 2 |
| Byron Shire Compass | 1 |
| Byron Independents | 1 |
| Bright Future Byron | 1 |
| Total | 9 |

The current council, elected in 2024, in order of election, is:

| Councillor | Party | Notes |
|---|---|---|
| Sarah Ndiaye | Greens | Mayor since 2024 |
| Elia Hauge | Greens | |
| Asren Pugh | Labor | |
| David Warth | Byron Shire Compass | |
| Michael Lyon | Byron Independents | Mayor from 2021 until 2024 |
| Delta Kay | Greens | |
| Janet Swain | Labor | |
| Michelle Lowe | Greens | |
| Jack Dods | Bright Future Byron | |

== Election results ==
=== 2024 ===
2024 Byron Shire Council election
| Party | Candidate | Votes | % | ±% |
|---|---|---|---|---|
| Greens | 1. Sarah Ndiaye; 2. Elia Hauge (elected 1); 3. Delta Kay (elected 5); 4. Michelle Lowe (elected 7); 5. Nell Schofield | 6,772 | 36.7 | +15.2 |
| Labor | 1. Asren Pugh (elected 2); 2. Janet Swain (elected 6); 3. Mark Swivel; 4. Peter Doherty; 5. Diana James; 6. Linda Watson | 5,001 | 27.1 | +13.7 |
| Byron Shire Compass | 1. David Warth (elected 3); 2. Susie Figgis; 3. Nyck Jeanes; 4. Trisha Gizas-Barker | 2,503 | 13.6 | +13.6 |
| Byron Independents | 1. Michael Lyon (elected 4); 2. Max Foggon; 3. Rhett Holt; 4. Jeannette Martin | 2,161 | 11.7 | −8.8 |
| Bright Future Byron | 1. Jack Dods (elected 8); 2. David Michie; 3. Meredith Wray; 4. Niamh Dove | 1,765 | 9.6 | +9.6 |
| Independent | Lucy Vader | 240 | 1.3 | +1.3 |
| Total formal votes | | 18,442 | 94.0 | |
| Informal votes | | 1,181 | 6.0 | |
| Turnout | | 19,623 | 71.4 | |

=== 2021 ===
| Elected councillor | Party |
|---|---|
| Duncan Dey | Greens |
| Cate Coorey | Independent (Group B) |
| Mark Swivel | Mark Swivel Team |
| Sama Balson | Byron Independents |
| Asren Pugh | Labor |
| Sarah Ndiaye | Greens |
| Peter Westheimer | Byron Independents |
| Alan Hunter | Byron Alliance |

2021 New South Wales local elections: Byron
| Party | Candidate | Votes | % | ±% |
|---|---|---|---|---|
| Greens | | 3,755 | 21.2 | −21.7 |
| Byron Independents | | 3,627 | 20.5 | |
| Mark Swivel Team | | 2,969 | 16.7 | |
| Independent (Group B) | | 2,633 | 14.8 | |
| Labor | | 2,196 | 12.4 | |
| Byron Alliance | | 1,235 | 7.0 | |
| Byron Shire Action Group | | 975 | 5.5 | |
| Independent | John Anderson | 345 | 1.9 | |
| Total formal votes | | 17,735 | 94.6 | |
| Informal votes | | 1,021 | 5.4 | |
| Turnout | | 18,756 | 73.8 | |
| Party total seats | | | Seats | ± |
| Independent | | | 5 | ▲3 |
| Greens | | | 2 | ▼1 |
| Labor | | | 1 | ▼1 |

- Incumbent councillor Basil Cameron (Our Sustainable Future) did not seek re-election
