= Upper Main Arm, New South Wales =

Upper Main Arm New South Wales
- Coordinates: 28°29′54″S 153°25′4″E
- Population: 283 (SAL 2021)
- Postcode(s): 2482
- LGA(s): Byron Shire
- State electorate(s): Ballina
- Federal division(s): Richmond

Upper Main Arm is a locality located in the Northern Rivers Region of New South Wales. It is located in the Byron Shire local government area and is approximately 25 kilometres (16 mi) from the regional centre of Byron Bay and the closest town is Mullumbimby which is 7.5 kilometres (4.7 mi) away.

It is closely associated and nearby to Main Arm.

The traditional owners of this place are the Bundjalung (Arakwal) people.

== Origin of place name ==
This area was originally known as 'Toolond', which is taken from the Yugambeh–Bundjalung languages word 'juluny; meaning 'lizard'. The name Toolond waivered in popularity and the school, originally known as Toolond School (built in 1927) was officially renamed Main Arm Upper Public School on 1 March 1946. Its polling place was officially renamed on 30 October 1947.

The name Upper Main Arm was adopted to be more consistent with Main Arm, which whom they shared many interests.

== Demographics ==
In the 2016 census, the population of Upper Main Arm was 225, which at the 2021 census had increased to 283.
