= Main Arm, New South Wales =

Main Arm
- Town
- Coordinates: 28°29′54″S 153°26′4″E
- Country: Australia
- State: New South Wales
- LGA: Byron Shire

Government
  - State electorate: Ballina
  - Federal division: Richmond

Population
  - Total: 640 (SAL 2021)
- Postcode: 2482

Main Arm is a locality located in the Northern Rivers Region of New South Wales. It is located in the Byron Shire local government area and is approximately 32 kilometres (20 mi) from the regional centre of Byron Bay and the closest town is Mullumbimby which is 14 kilometres (8.7 mi) away.

It is nearby to and closely associated with Upper Main Arm.

The traditional owners of this place are the Bundjalung (Arakwal) people.

== Origin of place name ==
The name Main Arm is taken from its location nearby to where Blindmouth Creek flows into the Brunswick River and, in 1899, was almost named Durrumbul which is now the name of the local community hall and local public school.

== History ==
The area was settled by Europeans from the 1890s but the first signs of permanent settlement were in 1905, with the construction of a sawmill, this was followed by the construction of a gothic-style Presbyterian Church in March 1909.

There was significant growth in the area post World War I when blocks were granted to returning soldiers as part of a soldier settlement scheme; it was during this time that Settlement Road was built on he southern section of Main Arm after grievances were raised about lack of access. Despite this growth the area struggled to remain agriculturally viable during the Great Depression.

Main Arm became the centre of a 'banana boom' in the area from the late 1930s until it declined in the 1950s; as a part of this boom a Banana Syndicate was formed. During this boom they experienced significant issues with Banana bunchy top virus.

In the late 1960s and early 1970s, during a decline in agriculture, many 'hippies' arrived in Main Arm and a number of communes and Rural Landsharing Communities, primarily in the form of multiple occupancies, were started as significant amounts of land was available cheaply. This included the Karu Kali Community which was started by Nicholas Shand, who later founded the Byron Shire Echo and Kohinur which was started by Colin Scattergood.

== Demographics ==
In the 2016 census, the population of Main Arm was 586, which at the 2021 census had increased to 640.

== Gallery ==
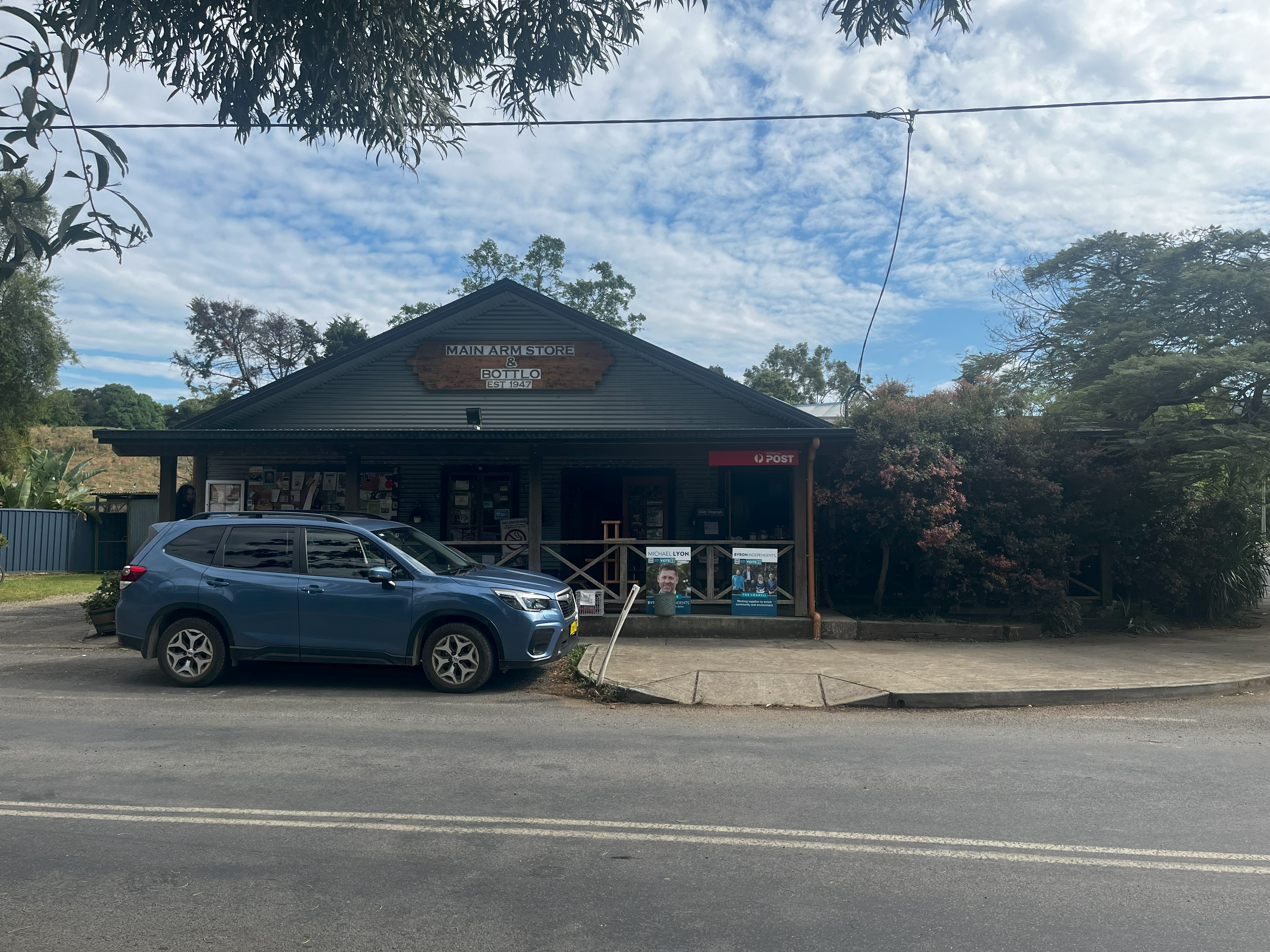
A picture of the Main Arm Store and Bottlo, est. 1947, as pictured in September 2024

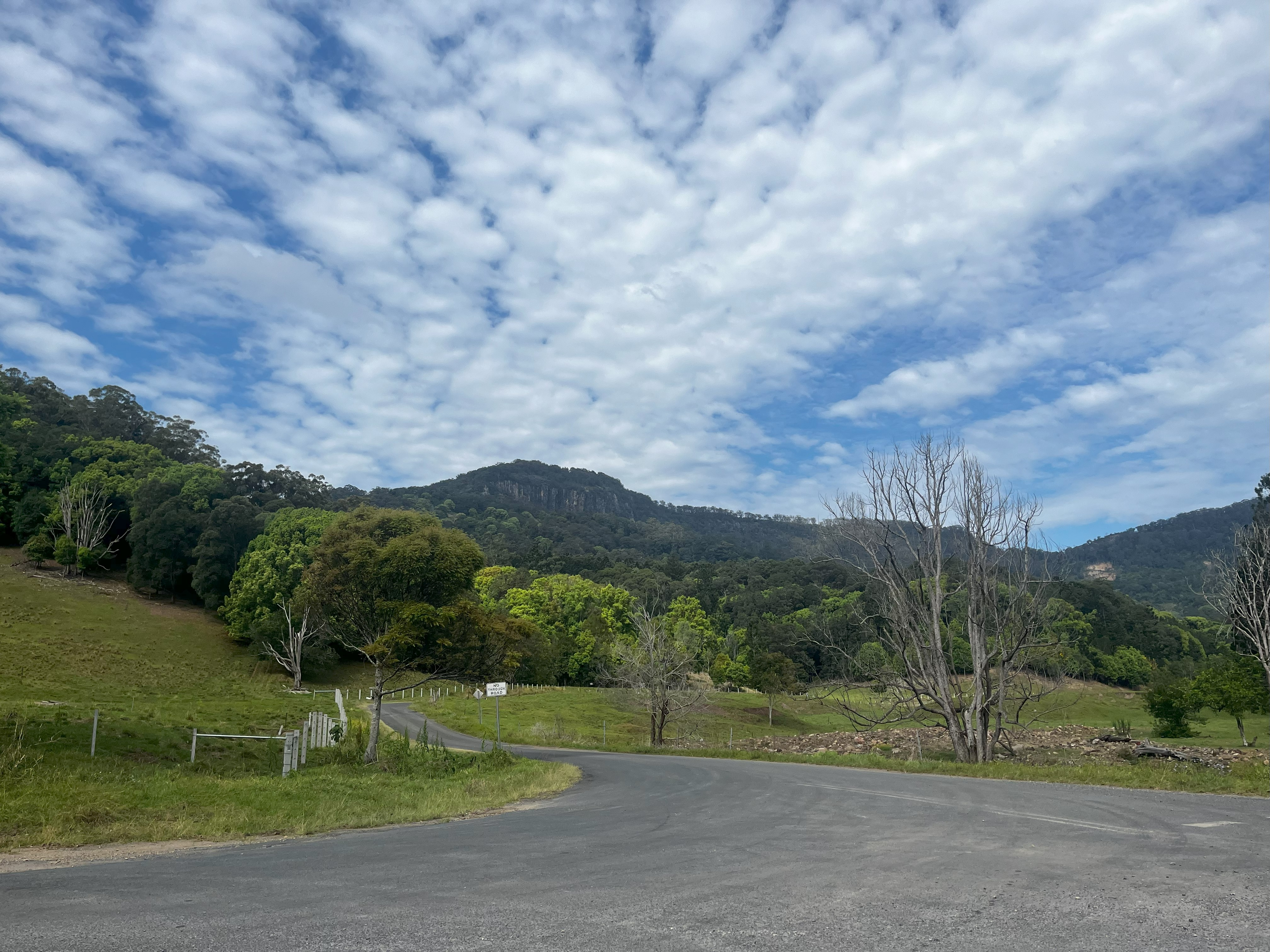
A road in Main Arm as pictured in September 2024

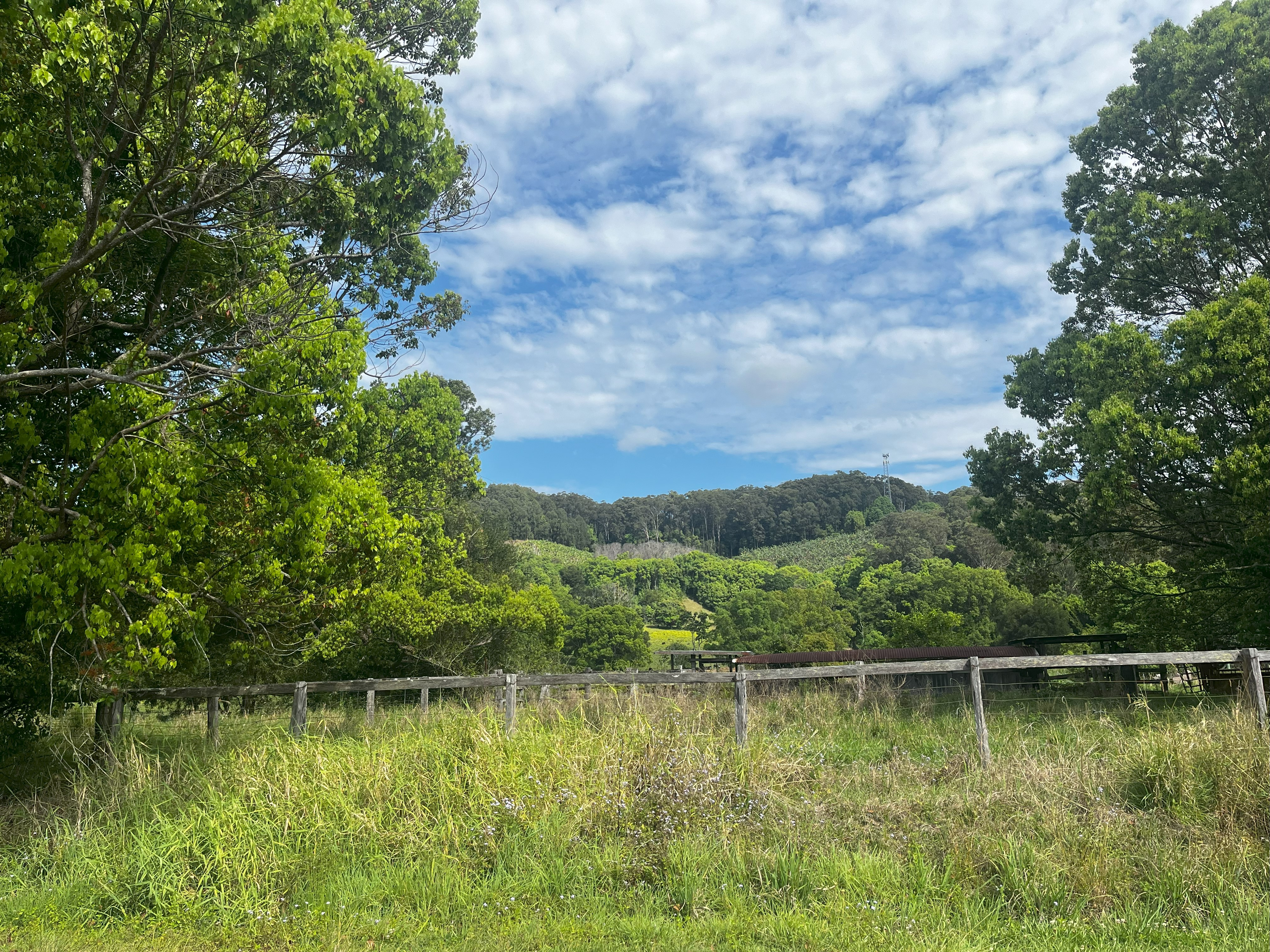
A view in Main Arm as pictured in September 2024

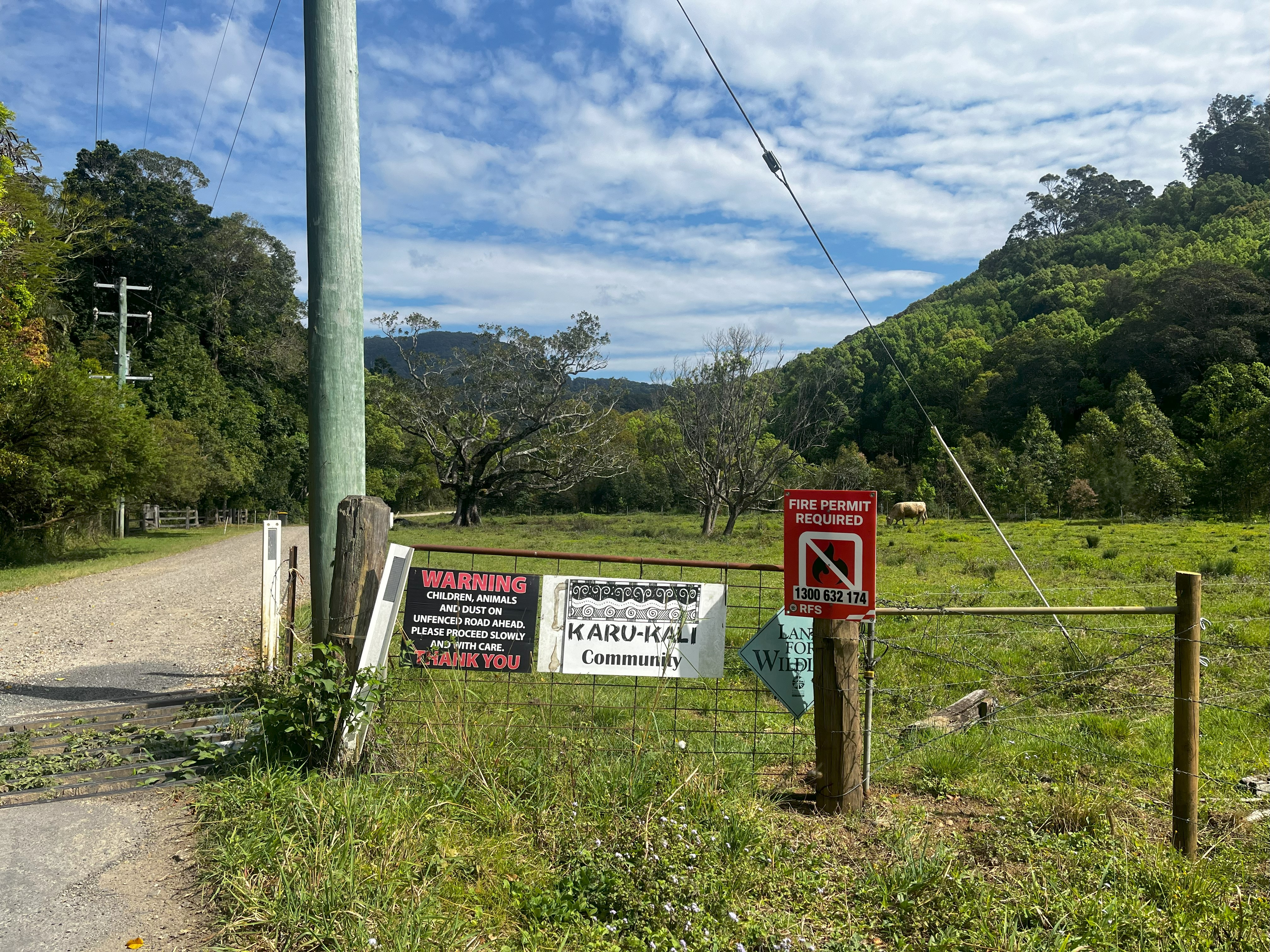
Entry sign for the Karu-Kali Community in Main Arm as pictured in September 2024
