= Binna Burra, New South Wales =

Town in New South Wales, Australia

Binna Burra
- Town
- Coordinates: 28°41′54″S 153°29′4″E
- Country: Australia
- State: New South Wales
- LGA: Byron Shire

Government
  - State electorate: Ballina
  - Federal division: Richmond

Population
  - Total: 218 (2011 census)
- Time zone: UTC+10 (AEST)
  - Summer (DST): UTC+11 (AEDT)
- Postcode: 2479

Binna Burra is a village in the Northern Rivers region of New South Wales, Australia 18 kilometres (11 mi) from the regional centre of Byron Bay. It is within the Byron Shire local government area.

The traditional owners of this area are the Bundjalung people.

At the 2016 census, Binna Burra had a population of 218.

== Origin of place name ==
The name Binna Burra is derived from the Yugambeh–Bundjalung language words buinaburra or bunna bunna which means 'beech tree' of 'place of (white) beech trees'.
