= Coopers Shoot, New South Wales =

Coopers Shoot
- Coordinates: 28°41′36″S 153°34′11″E
- Country: Australia
- State: New South Wales
- LGA: Byron Shire

Government
  - State electorate: Ballina
  - Federal division: Richmond

Population
  - Total: 409 (2021 census)
- Postcode: 2481

Coopers Shoot is a locality in the Byron Shire of the Northern Rivers region in New South Wales, Australia. Coopers Shoot Road is 5 km (3.1 mi) south of Jonson Street, one of the main streets of Byron Bay, and sits high on the ridge overlooking the ocean. The closest beach, Tallow Beach, is 4 km (2.5 mi) away.

At the 2021 Census, its population was 409, compared to the 2016 population of 265.

It is on the lands of the Bundjalung (Arakwal) people.

== Origin of place name ==
Coopers Shoot is likely named for the Cooper family who lived at the nearby Emigrant Creek and, more specifically, for George John Cooper Junior and his son James Jarrett Cooper.

The shoot part of the name refers to steep areas and areas with cliffs that were used to slide or roll logs down when logging was common in the area and were an important means of transporting logs. These shoots were an integral part of the early road network and the shoot at Coopers Shoot was considered a particularly difficult one to navigate.

In 1885 the following description was made of Cooper Shoot:

The name is significant, and it is only possible to get an idea of this almost perpendicular road by personal ascent or descent. The descent is more disagreeable, especially in wet weather, for then it is like an ice slide, Lead your horse, and he will probably roll down and crush you. Ride him and you will have equal chance of sliding over his head as he slips, or of keeping him company as he turns summersaults and other acrobatic feats on his journey to the bottom. But once on the top, although it is a great struggle to get there, one is rewarded with a glorious view of the ocean and the sea beach.

— Peter Spinifex, A holiday trip to the big scrub, 28 November 1885, The Daily Telegraph (Sydney)
