= Wytaliba =

Community in New South Wales, Australia

- other
- Coordinates: 29°41′38″S 152°02′42″E
- Country: Australia
- State: New South Wales
- LGA(s): Glen Innes Severn
- Established: 1970s

Government
  - Mayor: Carol Sparks
  - State electorate(s): Northern Tablelands
  - Federal division(s): New England
- Elevation: 380 m (1,250 ft)

Population
  - Total(s): c100
- Postcode: 2370

Wytaliba is a community in north-east New South Wales. It is located next to the Mann River, between the Mann River Nature Reserve and Barool National Park, about 40 km east of Glen Innes, and has a population of around 100.

== History ==
Wytaliba started as a commune in the 1970s. Chunks of land in Wytaliba were sold off, meaning properties are often giant plots of empty land with small buildings on or around them.

== Facilities ==
Wytaliba has a public school with an enrolment of about 10 students.

== Glen Innes fire ==
In November 2019 a bushfire swept through Wytaliba. Two people were killed and many structures, including the school, were partially or wholly destroyed.
