= Federal, New South Wales =

Town in New South Wales, Australia

Federal
- Town
- Coordinates: 28°39′03″S 153°27′19″E
- Country: Australia
- State: New South Wales
- LGA: Byron Shire
- Location: 780 km (480 mi) NNE of Sydney; 171 km (106 mi) SSE of Brisbane; 20 km (12 mi) w of Byron Bay

Government
  - State electorate: Ballina
  - Federal division: Richmond
- Elevation: 140 m (460 ft)

Population
  - Total: 712 (2011 census)
- Time zone: UTC+10 (AEST)
  - Summer (DST): UTC+11 (AEDT)
- Postcode: 2480

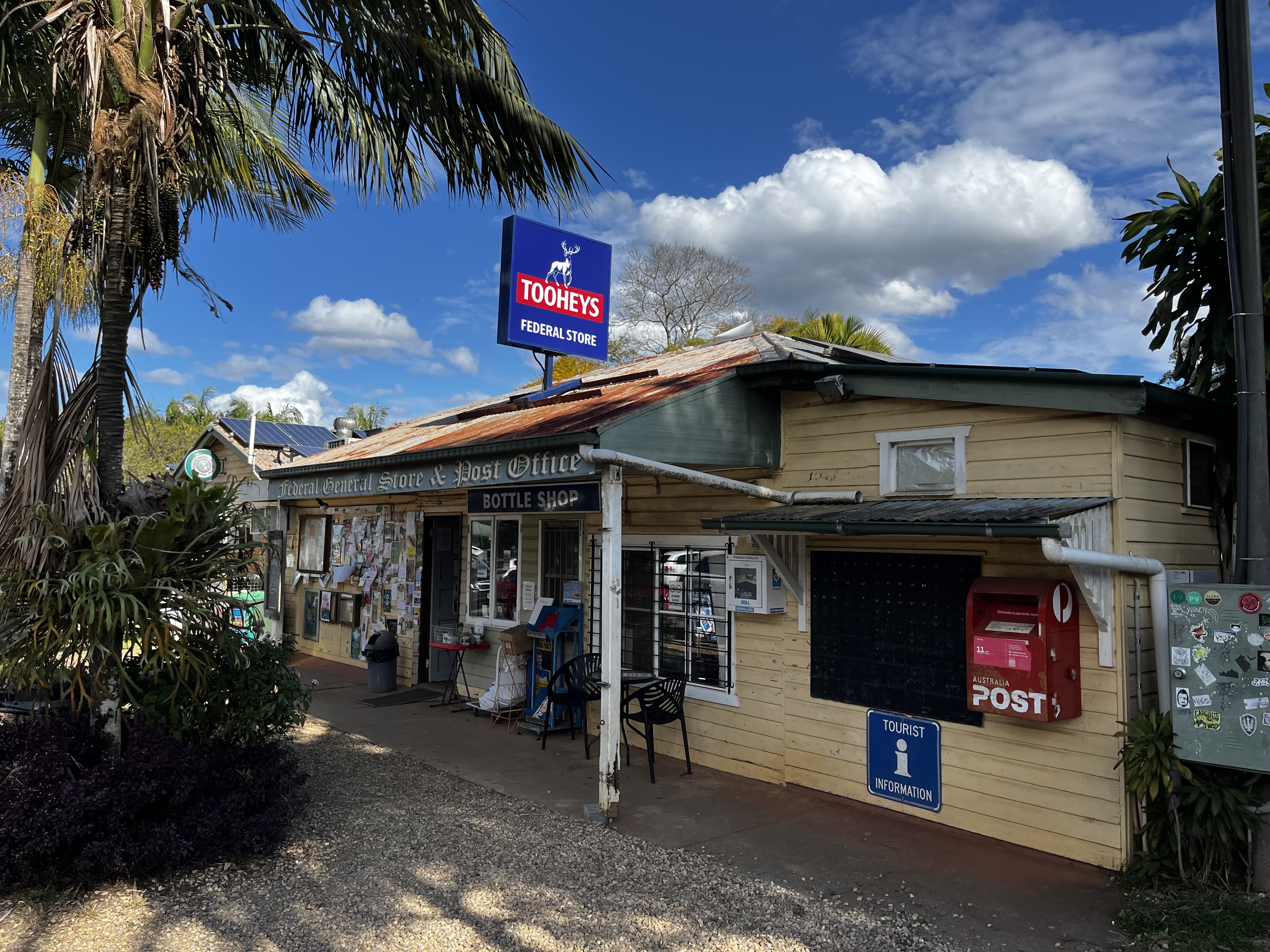
Federal General Store and Post Office, 2024

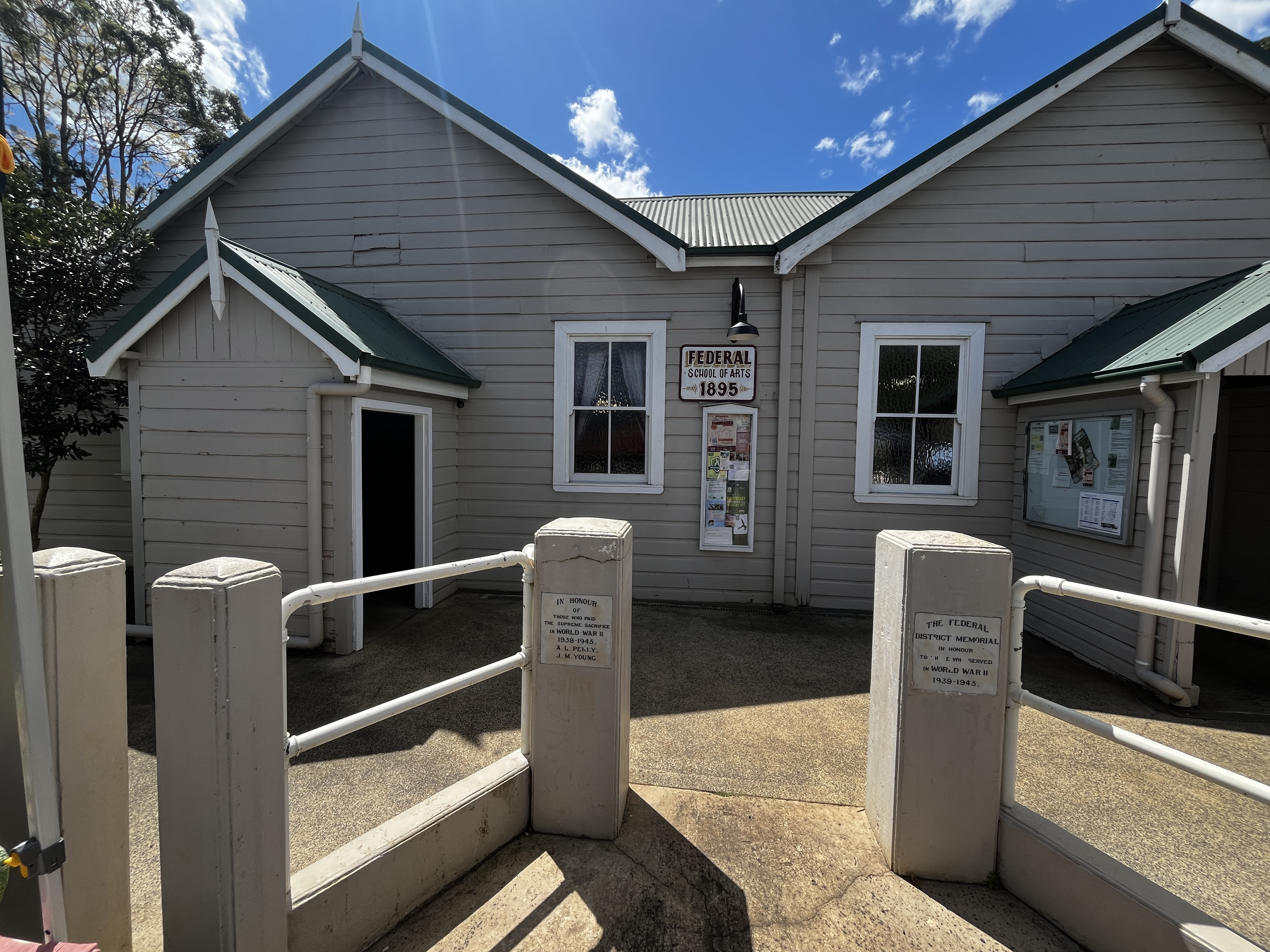
The Federal School of Arts, 2025

Federal is a village in the Northern Rivers region of New South Wales, Australia. It is located in the Byron Shire local government area. It is approximately 20 kilometres (12 mi) from the regional centre of Byron Bay. It is 13 kilometres (8.1 mi) to Minyon Falls which is within the Nightcap National Park.

The village lies in the traditional territory of the Widjabal, a subgroup of the Bundjalung people. It stands on land that was a part of The Big Scrub, 75,000 hectares of lowland subtropical rainforest which was cleared for agricultural use; this clearing also dispossessed many of the Bundjalung people.

At the 2011 census, Federal had a population of 712. At the 2021 census, the population was 784, with a median age of 47.

== History ==
The village is one of the older in the area and it was originally known as Jaspar (or Jasper), until it was cleared for the use of agriculture in the 19th century with farmers moving to the area in 1882. Some of the first European settlers were William Risley and William John Bate who were led there by a cedar-getter named Daniel Withers.

When still known as Jaspar, The Federal Butter Factory was built there, this factory was a part of a dairy co-operative and was constructed around 1893. Its name is thought to have been proposed by members of the co-operative in support of the Federation of Australia.

The village was renamed Federal when a post office was built by the factory in 1899 and the name changed in common use but was not formally changed until 1906 after petitioning to the government.

Over the last years, Federal has seen settlers revitalise new services and endures as a quaint village for its rural lifestyle.
