= Upper Coopers Creek, New South Wales =

Upper Coopers Creek New South Wales
- Coordinates: 28°35′54″S 153°24′4″E
- Population: 65 (2016 census)
- Postcode(s): 2482
- LGA(s): Byron Shire
- State electorate(s): Ballina
- Federal division(s): Richmond

Upper Coopers Creek is a locality located in the Northern Rivers Region of New South Wales.
