= Wilsons Creek, New South Wales =

Wilsons Creek
- Town
- Coordinates: 28°34′S 153°26′E
- Country: Australia
- State: New South Wales
- LGA: Byron Shire

Government
  - State electorate: Ballina
  - Federal division: Richmond

Population
  - Total: 466 (SAL 2021)
- Postcode: 2482

Wilsons Creek is a locality in the Northern Rivers region of New South Wales, Australia in Byron Shire. It is in the valley of what is now named the Wilsons River and is 5 km from Mullumbimby. It has a public school and numerous farms along the river.

The town has a proportionately large Jewish community, with 5.2% of the town's 466 residents identifying as Jewish as of the 2021 census. However, this only sums up to 24 individuals, due to the town's small population. Furthermore, 2.4% of the town's residents (11 people) were born in Israel and 4.7% (22 people) speak Hebrew at home.

== Politics ==
At the 2016 federal election, the Wilsons Creek polling booth recorded one of the highest Greens votes in the nation, with over 60% of voters giving the Australian Greens their first preference.
