= Mullumbimby Hydro-electric Power Station Complex =

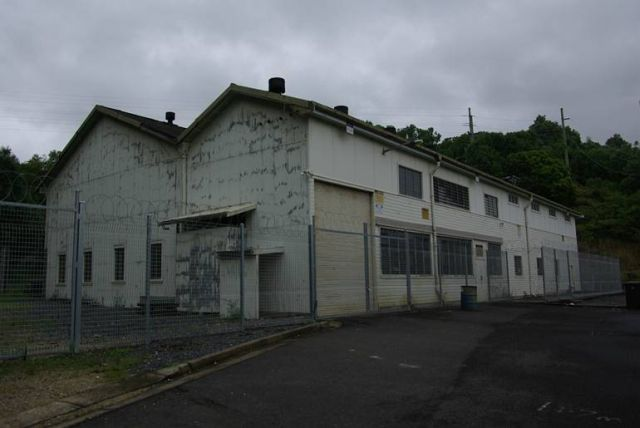
- Entry to Mullumbimby Hyrdo-electric Power Station

- Location within New South Wales Location within Australia
- 28°34′17.9″S 153°27′10.3″E
- Location: Wilsons Creek Road, Mullumbimby, Byron Shire, New South Wales, Australia

History
- Built: 1924–1926

Site notes
- Architect: William Corin
- Owner: Byron Shire Council; Essential Energy

New South Wales Heritage Register
- Official name: Mullumbimby Hydro-electric Power Station Complex; Power Station and Race; Lavertys Gap Power Station.; Mullumbimby Power Station and Substation
- Type: state heritage (complex / group)
- Designated: 27 June 2014
- Reference no.: 1926
- Type: Electricity Generator/Power Station - hydro-electric
- Category: Utilities - Electricity

Mullumbimby Hydro-electric Power Station Complex is a heritage-listed former hydroelectric power station at Wilsons Creek Road, Mullumbimby, Byron Shire, New South Wales, Australia. It was designed by William Corin and built from 1924 to 1926. It is also known as Lavertys Gap Power Station and Mullumbimby Power Station and Substation. The property is owned by the Byron Shire Council and Essential Energy. It was added to the New South Wales State Heritage Register on 27 June 2014.

== History ==
As early as 1909 government interest in securing a local water supply saw an area set aside on the main arm of the Brunswick River for a future water supply. Credit for the eventual location of the complex can be partially attributed to Councillor W. E. Selwood who advised Council that by erecting a weir across Wilsons Creek and running the water initially through an open cut drain and then through tunnels the water could operate hydro-electric units.

Mullumbimby Hydro-electric Power Station was an undertaking by Mullumbimby Municipal Council. The initial station was designed by consulting engineer William Corin, who was commissioned by the local council in September 1923 to prepare and commence the scheme. The site of the power house was surveyed in December 1924.

William Corin became Chief Electrical Engineer in the Department of Public Works in 1908, and consultant to the Department of Mines, New South Wales where he reported on the Snowy River hydro-electric scheme. After 1923 he became a private consultant to various governments. His work is commemorated by the Corin Dam in the Australian Capital Territory.

By 1924 construction of the weir at Lavertys Gap (28°34′31.9″S 153°26′41.9″E) on Wilsons Creek was underway in preparation for the Power Station. The weir is approximately 7m high with a crest of 45.72m. With a total storage of almost 140ML, the weir provides just over 25 million litres storage. The weir is also used as the town's water supply (the plan to combine the provision of water with generation of hydro-electric power had been agreed upon by the community in 1922).

The race, which was originally in earth fill, was 1450 feet (440m) and has since been replaced with concrete.

The tunnel through Lavertys Gap (28°34′32.7″S 153°26′58.6″E) was completed on the 1 December 1925. The water dammed at the weir came down the race, through the 350 foot (106.7m) tunnel in Laverty's Gap, and down a woodstave pipe (approximately 509m long and now cast iron) into the power house to the turbines. In December 1925 the scheme was turned on for the first time lighting the town of Mullumbimby. The Sydney Morning Herald reported at the time that "excitement prevailed in Mullumbimby on Wednesday night, when the electric light from the Mullumbimby hydro-electric scheme was switched on for the first time". Mullumbimby Municipal Council commenced the official generation and supply of hydro-electricity from Wilsons Creek on 6 March 1926.

At its official opening in 1926 the Mullumbimby Hydro-electric Power Station became the fifth large scale hydro-electric power station on the mainland, the earlier ones were: the Gara River Hydro-Electric Scheme, NSW (1895); Thargomindah, QLD (1898); Dorrigo, NSW (1922) and Nymboida, NSW (1924).

Having its own power supply would be a major source of income to the Municipal Council, which had taken out loans of over 25000 pounds. Fed from the same source, Byron Bay was lit on the 12 June and Bangalow on the 3 July 1926.

In the early days when the hydros were operating successfully, they were left unattended for long periods of time. When one of the staff come on duty, it was necessary to check the water level at the weir which meant a long walk up hill, check the water level and walk back to the power house. Later an electronic gauge was installed which, at a glance, showed the water level at the weir.

Soon after its commencement, a 4-cylinder crude oil engine was added to the plant in 1926. The engine was a Ruston Lincoln (referred to as Rustin and Hornsby by Tanner et al. (1993)). The initial capacity of the power station plant was soon insufficient. In 1934 the generating capacity was supported by a Mirrlees high speed, eight cylinder engine of 330 hp. Four years later an interconnection with the Clarence River County Council grid was achieved. A 33,000 volt transmission line from Lismore Power Station to Dunoon was extended to interconnect with the Mullumbimby Power Station at Lavertys Gap. This interconnection became effective on the 1 May 1938. Further additions to the plant were again necessary in 1941 (No.5 diesel unit), 1949 (No.6 diesel unit) and 1952 (No.7 diesel unit) . Altogether the installed capacity at the power plant in c.1958 was 3154 kW with an output of 14 million kwh per annum.

In 1990 the Mullumbimby Hydro-electric Power Station was decommissioned. The original two 225 hp Pelton turbines, directly coupled to 140 kilowatt GEC alternators, are still housed in the power station. The 200 hp Ruston Lincoln, the 333 hp Mirrlees Ricardo and 495 hp Mirrlees Ricardo engines are also still housed in the power station.

== Description ==
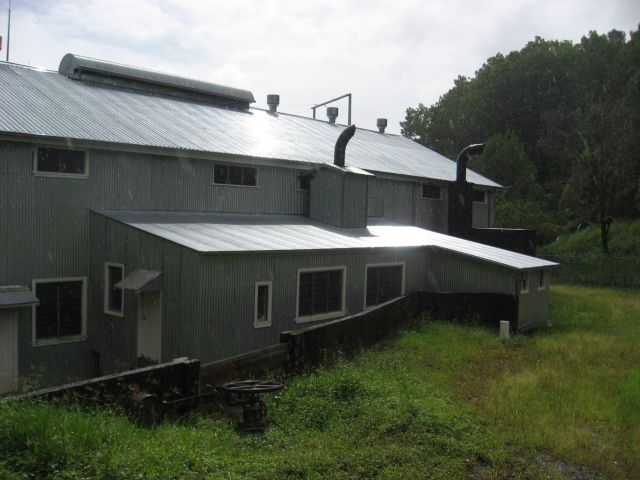
Rear view of the Mullumbimby Hydro-electric Power Station

Mullumbimby Hydro-electric Power Station is located amongst the hills outside Mullumbimby. The site of the power house has been partially cut into the hillside with a concrete retaining wall built along the northwest side. This wall, which has a height of almost 2 metres, also serves as a footing. A second retaining wall is located behind the building site to the southwest.

The power house is a timber-framed structure clad with corrugated iron. It has a double gable end roof with static air vents fitted along the ridge line. The building measures approximately 34 metres in length by 18 metres in width and is oriented northwest to southeast. Its main entrance faces northeast. Original louver windows of various sizes remain along the length of the building. A large roller door at the east end of the north elevation allows access to an interior mezzanine floor. Inside the power house the walls are partially clad with timber. A steel frame supports an 8 Tonne travelling crane used to move heavier items.

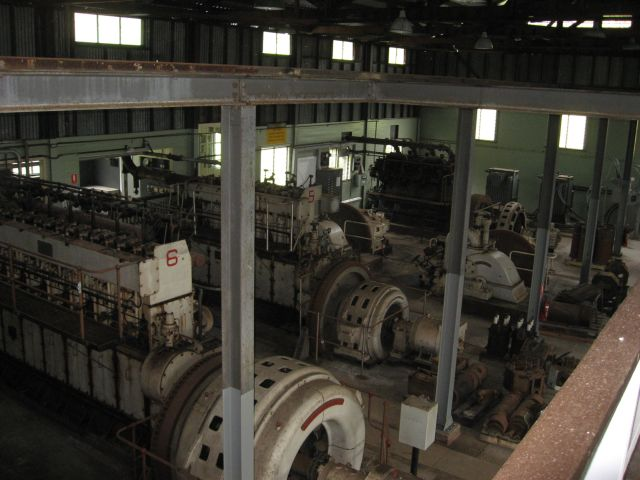
View of power station floor showing later diesel generators with original hydro turbines to rear

A unique collection of hydro and combustion engines are located inside the power station. They include two hydro-electric sets, both identical GEC Pelton wheel turbines of 144 KW capacity with Boving governor controls. The attached alternators are GEC, three phase with 650 volts output at 600rpm. The maker's plate on one of the turbines reads "Boving & Co. Ltd. London". The writing on the older engine from 1926 reads "Ruston Lincoln England". The generator's makers plate reads "The General Electric Co. Ltd. Witton England".

The four Mirrlees diesel engines are:

- A 7-cylinder engine with GEC alternator, 937 KVA, 11500 Volt output at 375rpm;
- A 5-cylinder engine with GEC alternator, 344 KVA, 660 Volt output at 375rpm;
- A 7-cylinder engine with Schorch alternator, 625 KVA, 400 volt output at 375rpm; and
- An 8-cylinder engine with brush alternator, 1150 KVA, 6600 volt output at 375 rpm.

All generators are three phase. In total there are three diesel engines and the old Ruston Lincoln engine, a 4-cylinder engine plus the two hydro-energy sets, each comprising turbine and generator.

Some features associated with the power generating equipment, including exhausts and a smaller cooling tower, are located on the south side of the power house; two smaller annexes are attached to the original building. A short distance southwards are the footings of two cooling towers that have been removed.

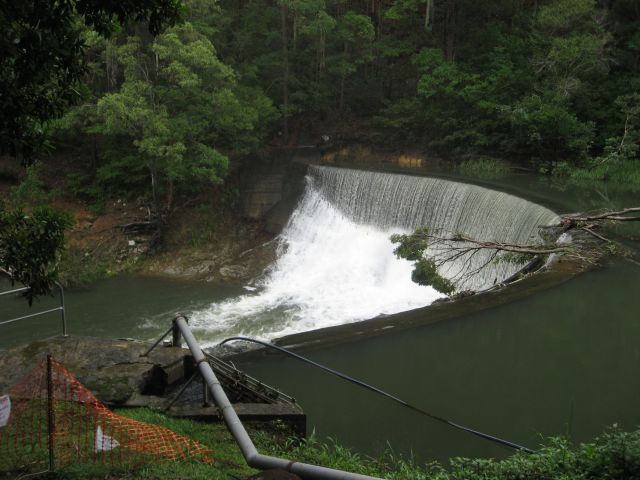
Lavertys Gap Weir

Descending down the adjacent hill, the end of the pipeline is located at the southwest corner of the powerhouse. This pipeline conveyed water to power the turbines from a weir built at Lavertys Gap above the Power House. The storage capacity of the weir is 30 million gallons. It has a height of 7m with a crest of 45.72m. Water runs away from the weir through a race, originally in earth fill that is now concrete and measures 440m. After flowing through a 106.7m tunnel driven through the saddle of the hill the water runs to a holding race above the water treatment plant. Water is diverted from this race to supply drinking water to Mullumbimby as well as flowing to the power station, at the foot of Lavertys Gap, through a cast iron pipeline, 509m in length, that was originally made in woodstave.

The Hydro-electric station contains a catalogued Movable Heritage Collection that relates to its industrial use. The following catalogued items are considered an important part of the significance of the site:

1. Three phase grinder.
2. Block and Tackle.
3. Prop for pipe cutting.
4. Timber block used for wad punching.
5. Handle for gate valve.
6. Shaft for gate valve.
7. Timber work benches.
8. Handle to roll 44 gallon drums.
9. Pikes for standing poles.
10. Ten ton block and tackle.
11. 44 gallon drum roller.
12. Hooks to store chains, wire ropes & shackles.
13. Transformer for lead light.
14. Steel bar to turn the engine over.
15. Pirometers used for reading exhaust gas temperature.
16. Set of spanners.
17. Set of tools for the turbine.
18. Buckets for the turbine.
19. Air tank.
20. Stand for the air tank.
21. Transformers for the hydro units.
22. Relay tester.
23. Pallets of spare parts.
24. Timber brake for the fly wheels.
25. Control panel for the engines.
26. Signs.
27. Electric jug.
28. Mezzanine floor all items to be kept on shelves.
29. Two lights

The switching gear and controls appear to date from the 1950s or 1960s.

=== Condition ===
As at 30 November 2012, the power plant shows signs of moderate deterioration and is in the need of some maintenance and repair. The asbestos sheeting on the roof had recently been replaced with galvanised corrugated iron as had the walls. The water race was in good condition, showing signs of maintenance and repair. In some sections the land at the edges of the race has been sandbagged to prevent erosion.

The Mullumbimby Power House complex is in excellent condition. Minor modernisation has generally occurred to provide for the increased demand. The retention of machinery in its original contexts adds strength to the integrity of this site.

A recent upgraded substation and three large sheds (Terranora Interconnector) have also been built to the north west in recent years. The original substation has been removed from the site along with two cooling towers, two sheds and a weatherboard cottage.

== Heritage listing ==
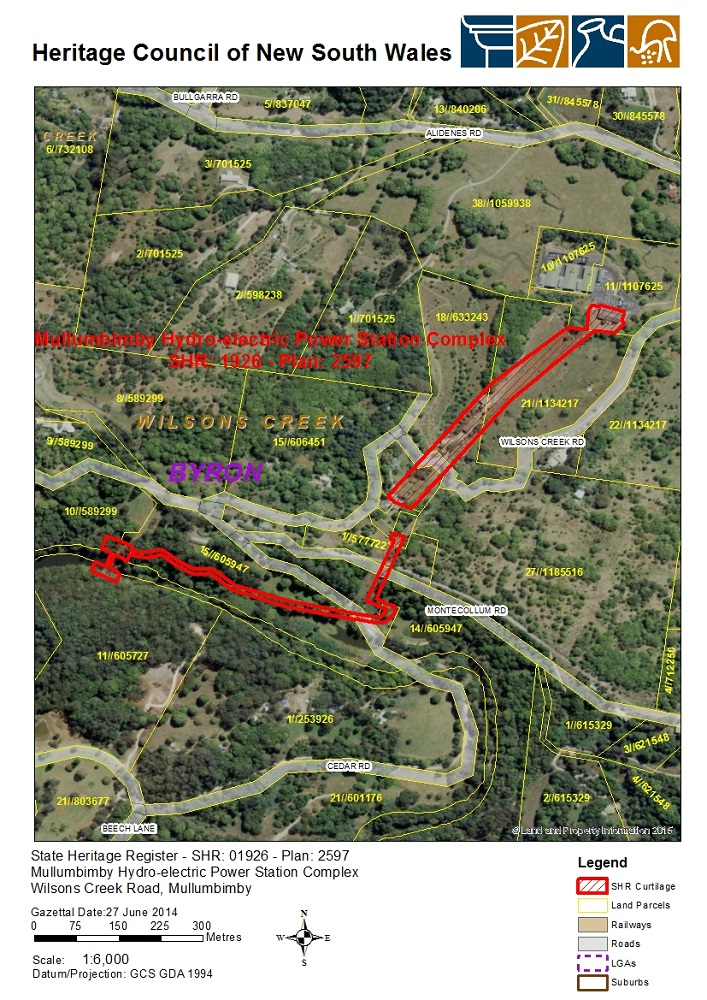
Heritage boundaries

The Mullumbimby Power Station Complex, incorporating Hydro-electric Power Station, Lavertys Gap Weir and associated water races, are of state heritage significance as a complete system associated with a smaller provincial hydro-electric power station built by Mullumbimby Municipal Council as part of the provision and supply of electricity from the mid-1920s. It was the fourth hydro-electric power station built in NSW for the large scale provision of electricity and the fifth constructed on the mainland. Associated with the early development of hydro-electricity in NSW it represents the transition from local councils and private companies to county councils in the provision and supply of electricity to the community.

The Mullumbimby Hydro-electric Power Station complex is a fine example of a 1920s provincial hydro-electric power generating complex complete with a significant collection of associated features and machinery. Its power house, machinery, steel pipes, annexes, cooling tower, valves, race and weir are an intact collection and a physical example of hydro-electric development and technical innovation in the Byron area in the since 1924.

The size and intactness of the Mullumbimby Power Station and associated items, the dominant form and fabric of the power house and its imposing presence within a natural setting afford the complex considerable aesthetic and technical value. The surviving collection of hydro and combustion engines including two GEC Pelton wheel turbines, a Boving & Co. Ltd engine, Ruston Lincoln engine, a General Electric Co. Ltd generator, and four Mirrlees diesel engines, as well as the overhead travelling cranes, are a rare industrial collection surviving within their original context. Considered to be particularly rare, are the Pelton turbines which are two of only a few examples surviving in their original context worldwide.

The Hydro-electric station contains a catalogued Movable Heritage Collection that relates to its industrial use including tools and machinery elements. These form an important part of the intact collection at this site.

Mullumbimby Hydro-electric Power Station Complex was listed on the New South Wales State Heritage Register on 27 June 2014 having satisfied the following criteria.

The place is important in demonstrating the course, or pattern, of cultural or natural history in New South Wales.

The Mullumbimby Hydro-electric Power Station, Lavertys Gap Weir and Water Races meet this criterion at State level as the fourth hydro-electric power station complex to be built in NSW and the fifth in mainland Australia. In addition, it is significant for its association with the development of hydro-electric power generation in New South Wales.

It meets this criterion at a local level as part of a group of power stations and associated items in the Northern Rivers region. Mullumbimby Hydro-electric Power Station has played an important role in the development of electricity generation and supply to the local area since the mid-1920s up to its decommissioning in 1989.

Originally built by Mullumbimby Municipal Council, its ownership and management by the Council provided income to the municipality, contributing to the economic development of the region. The Power Station is also of local historical significance as it represents the transition from Local Councils and private companies to County Councils in the provision and supply of electricity to the community.

The place is important in demonstrating aesthetic characteristics and/or a high degree of creative or technical achievement in New South Wales.

It meets this criterion at State level due to its largely preserved appearance, its size, dominant form and its imposing presence as a steel structure within a natural setting.

The preservation of associated features including its machinery, steel pipes, valves, race and weir also afford this historic site considerable aesthetic significance.

The hydro-electric complex is aesthetically distinctive as an industrial display of creative and technical innovation. The power house, its associated structures and machinery are of technical interest.

The place has strong or special association with a particular community or cultural group in New South Wales for social, cultural or spiritual reasons.

It meets this criterion at local level due to its importance to the Byron Shire community and the regional community as part of an important 1920s endeavour to make the north coast self-sufficient on hydro-electric power.

The Power Station has special associations for former workers and is appreciated for its contribution to the economic development of the region through the provision of electricity to local industries, businesses and residences. This social significance is recognised through listing as a heritage item on the National Trust Register (NSW) and the Byron Local Environmental Plan.

The place has potential to yield information that will contribute to an understanding of the cultural or natural history of New South Wales.

It meets this criterion at State level as a reference of an early twentieth century hydro-electric complex.

Mullumbimby Hydro-electric Power Station has a rare ability to demonstrate once common work practices in the early to mid 20th century, which are now almost entirely discontinued through changes in technology and workplace health and safety requirements.

The Mullumbimby Hydro-electric Power Station and its associated machinery, steel pipes, valves, race and weir are an intact collection of one of the earliest hydro-electric power stations in NSW. This early technology has the potential to yield information on the early development of hydro-electric schemes in Australia. The Power Station has limited historical archaeological potential.

The place possesses uncommon, rare or endangered aspects of the cultural or natural history of New South Wales.

It meets this criterion at State level as the fourth hydro-electric power station in NSW. Mullumbimby Hydro-electric Power Station is unique because of the early combination of hydro-electric and diesel powered technology. The size and intactness of the Power Station and associated items also afford the industrial complex rarity value.

The two GEC Pelton wheel turbines, a Boving & Co. Ltd engine, Ruston Lincoln engine, a General Electric Co. Ltd generator, and four Mirrlees diesel engines, as well as the overhead travelling cranes, are a rare industrial collection surviving within their original context.

In particular, the GEC Pelton wheel turbines are two of only a few known examples surviving in their original context worldwide.

The place is important in demonstrating the principal characteristics of a class of cultural or natural places/environments in New South Wales.

It meets this criterion at State level as the Mullumbimby Hydro-electric Power Station Complex is a fine representative example of a mid 1920s provincial hydro-electric power generating complex.

It is representative of one of the earliest hydro-electric power stations in Australia and the associated items demonstrate the development of provincial power schemes by Local Councils in NSW in the 1920s.
