= Castle Doyle, New South Wales =

Castle Doyle New South Wales
- Coordinates: 30°37′00″S 151°46′00″E
- Population: 164 (2016 census)
- Postcode(s): 2350
- Location: 12 km (7 mi) SE of Armidale
- LGA(s): Armidale Regional Council
- State electorate(s): Northern Tablelands
- Federal division(s): New England

Castle Doyle is a locality in the Armidale Regional Council region of New South Wales, Australia. It is bounded by Commissioners Waters to the north and the Gara River to the east. It had a population of 164 as of the 2016 census.

Castle Doyle Post Office opened on 16 October 1884. It was downgraded to a receiving office from 1 January 1887 until being upgraded again on 1 July 1947. It closed on 30 November 1959.

Castle Doyle Public School operated from 1882 to 1886, 1898 to 1908, 1912 to 1921 and from 1929 until its final closure in 1933.

== Heritage listings ==
Castle Doyle has a number of heritage-listed sites, including:

- 10 km southeast of Armidale: Gara River Hydro-Electric Scheme
