= Gara River =

Gara River is the name of the following rivers:

- Gara River (Australia), a perennial river in the Northern Tablelands region of New South Wales, Australia
- A small river that flows into Slapton Ley in Devon, England
