= Mullumbimby =

Town in New South Wales, Australia

- Town
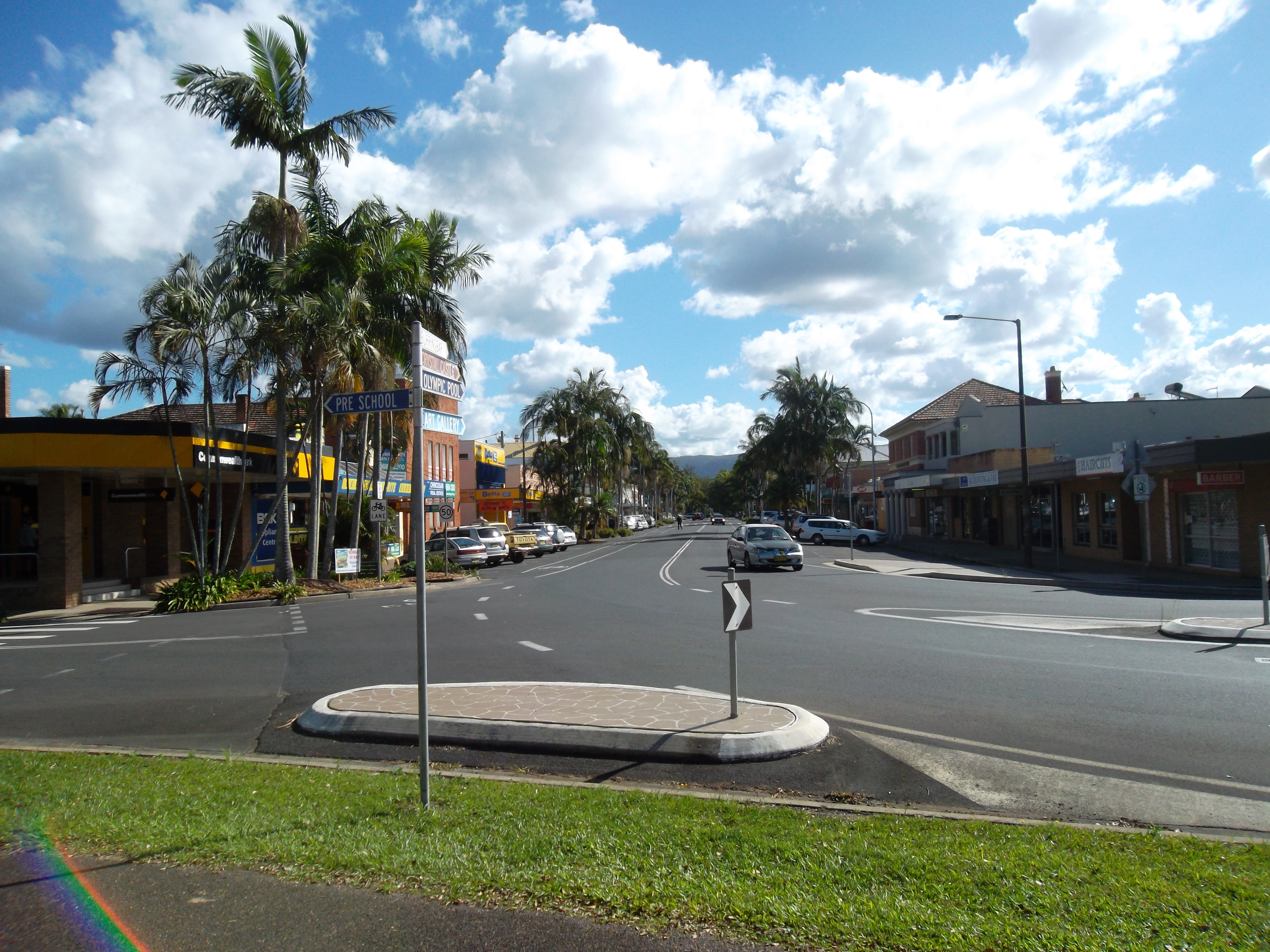
- Burringbar Street—Mullumbimby's main street

- Coordinates: 28°33′S 153°30′E
- Country: Australia
- State: New South Wales
- LGA: Byron Shire
- Location: 5 km (3.1 mi) WSW of Brunswick Heads; 15 km (9.3 mi) NW of Byron Bay; 36 km (22 mi) NE of Lismore; 130 km (81 mi) SSE of Brisbane; 628 km (390 mi) NNE of Sydney

Government
  - State electorate: Ballina
  - Federal division: Richmond
- Elevation: 6 m (20 ft)

Population
  - Total: 3,589 (2021 census)
- Postcode: 2482

Mullumbimby, locally nicknamed Mullum, is a town in the Byron Shire in the Northern Rivers region of New South Wales, Australia. It promotes itself as "The Biggest Little Town in Australia". It is known for its hippie subculture, and it has been referred to as "Australia's anti-vaxxer capital".

The town lies at the foot of Mount Chincogan in the Brunswick Valley about 9 kilometres (5.5 miles) by road from the coast. At the 2021 census, Mullumbimby and the surrounding area had a population of 3,589 people.

The Bundjalung people were the first people who lived in the area of Mullumbimby before the arrival of Europeans and remain the traditional owners of this place.

== History ==
The first European to explore the area was Henry John Rous in 1828.

The area was used for dairy farming and fruit growing.

In 2022, the town was affected by the eastern Australia floods.

=== Origins and name ===
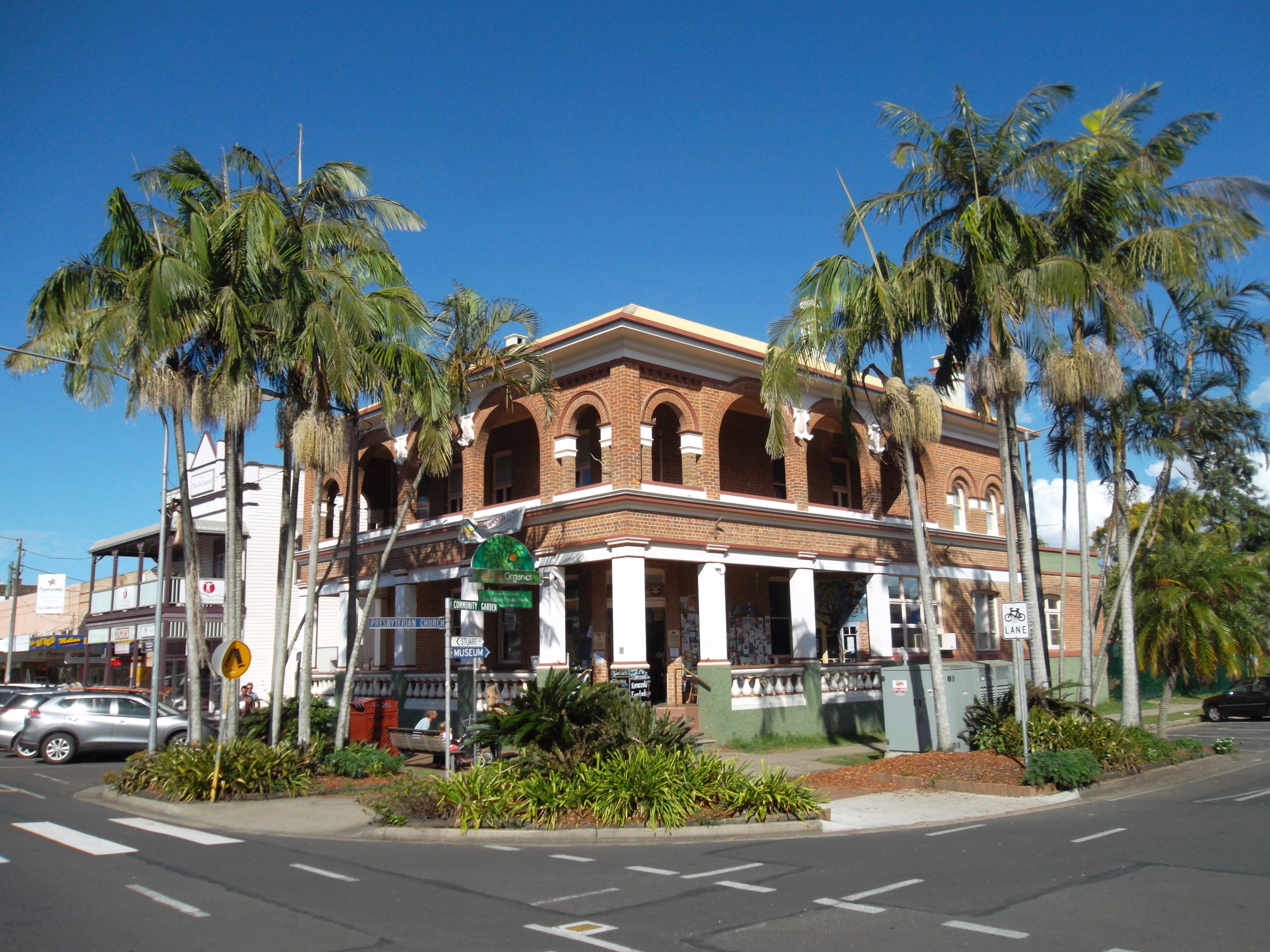
Old Bank of New South Wales building

In the 1850s Europeans had established a camp site at the junction of two arms of the Brunswick River. This grew to become a village and later the township of Mullumbimby. Mullumbimby was originally a centre for the timber industry. Notably, red cedar was collected in great quantities from around the area, a part of the far northern New South Wales "Big Scrub".

The town was a logical site for settlement by the timber hunters, as the Brunswick River is tidal in the town and navigable to that point, allowing logs to be floated down the river to its mouth at Brunswick Heads. The town's central location gave access to most of the catchment area, and it provided the best position for bullock teams to cross the river with their wagons loaded with timber. At low tide it is still possible to see the shallow region where the bullocks made the crossing of the Brunswick River, under the current "Federation Bridge" on Murwillumbah Road.

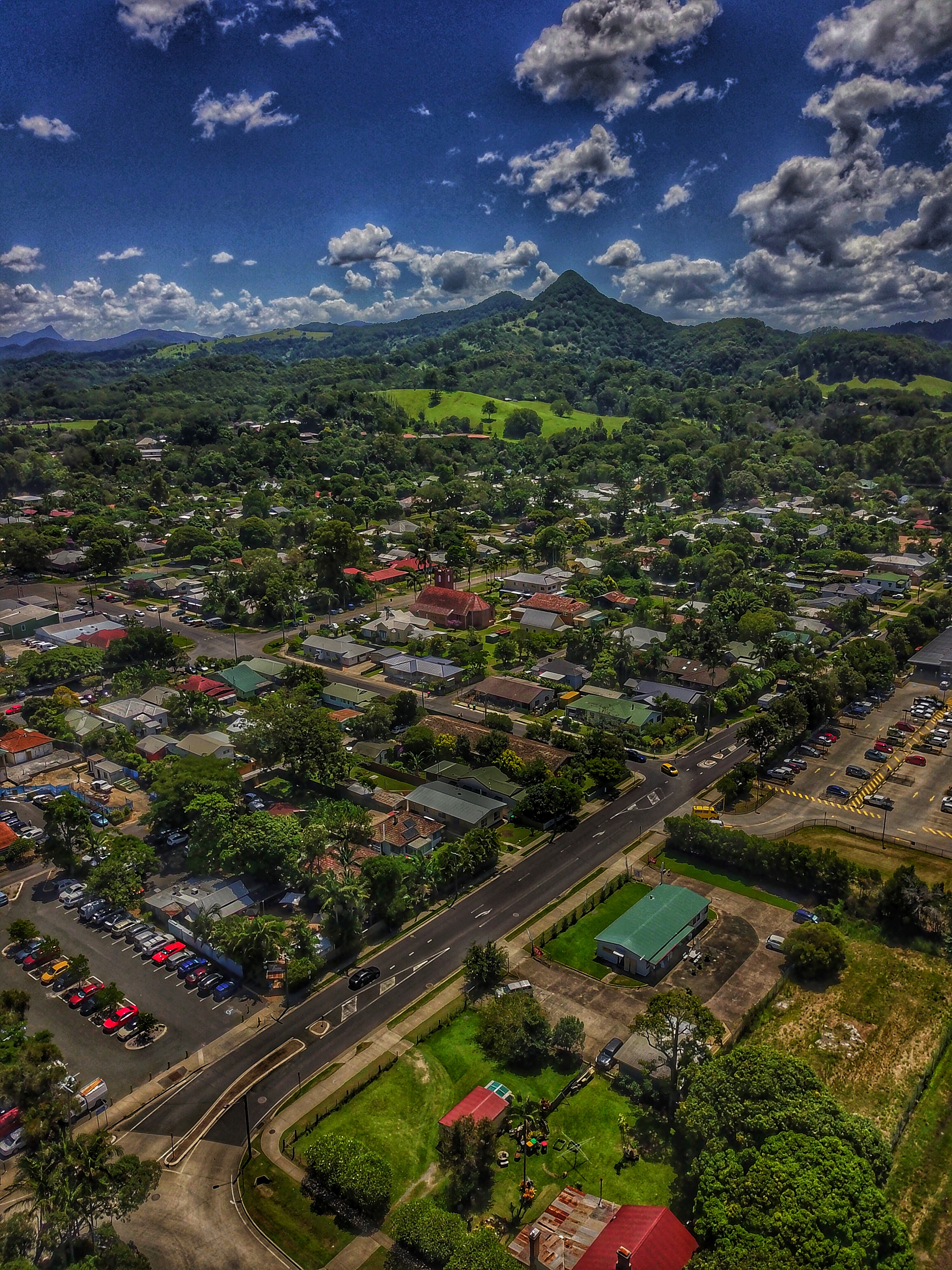
Aerial perspective of Mullumbimby taken autumn 2018

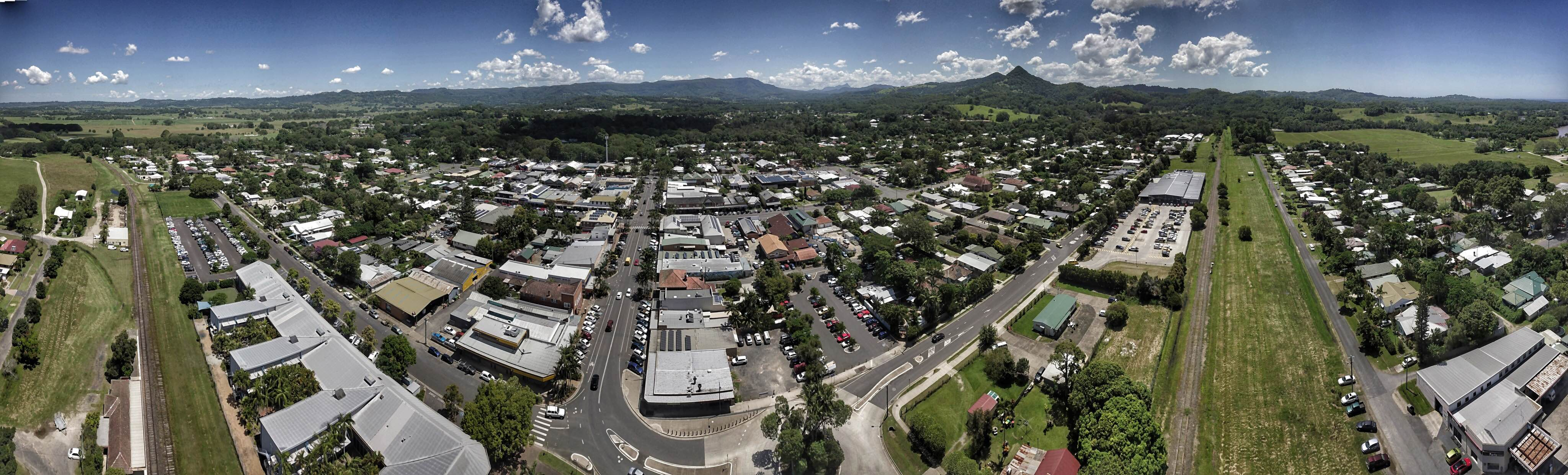
Aerial panorama of Mullumbimby taken autumn 2018

The name "Mullumbimby", meaning "small round hill", was given to the district by Aboriginal people. The name is derived from the Bandjalung-Yugambeh dialect mulubinba (possibly also pertaining to a native fern which grew in the vicinity). Although some sources claim this is because of the proximity of Mount Chincogan, however this mountain is likely too prominent in the landscape to fit the name.

An alternative theory is that it refers to another smaller and rounder hill. Suggestions include a medium hill to the north of Left Bank road, on which the town's water tower is located, or a smaller hill on Coolamon Scenic Drive, situated on the Daly Family Farm, near the current golf course. This latter hill is possibly supported by the abundant grass flats which surrounded it, known as Mullumbimby Grass.

Mullumbimby Grass are naturally open grass flats, presumably hunting grounds for the local Bundjalung people and they were later used by early European timber hunters to graze their bullock teams. The significance of this area lay not only in the feed it provided, but that some grasses in the naturally cleared area aided bullocks which had swallowed salt water when dragging timber into the surf for collection by nearby ships.

=== Cultural history ===
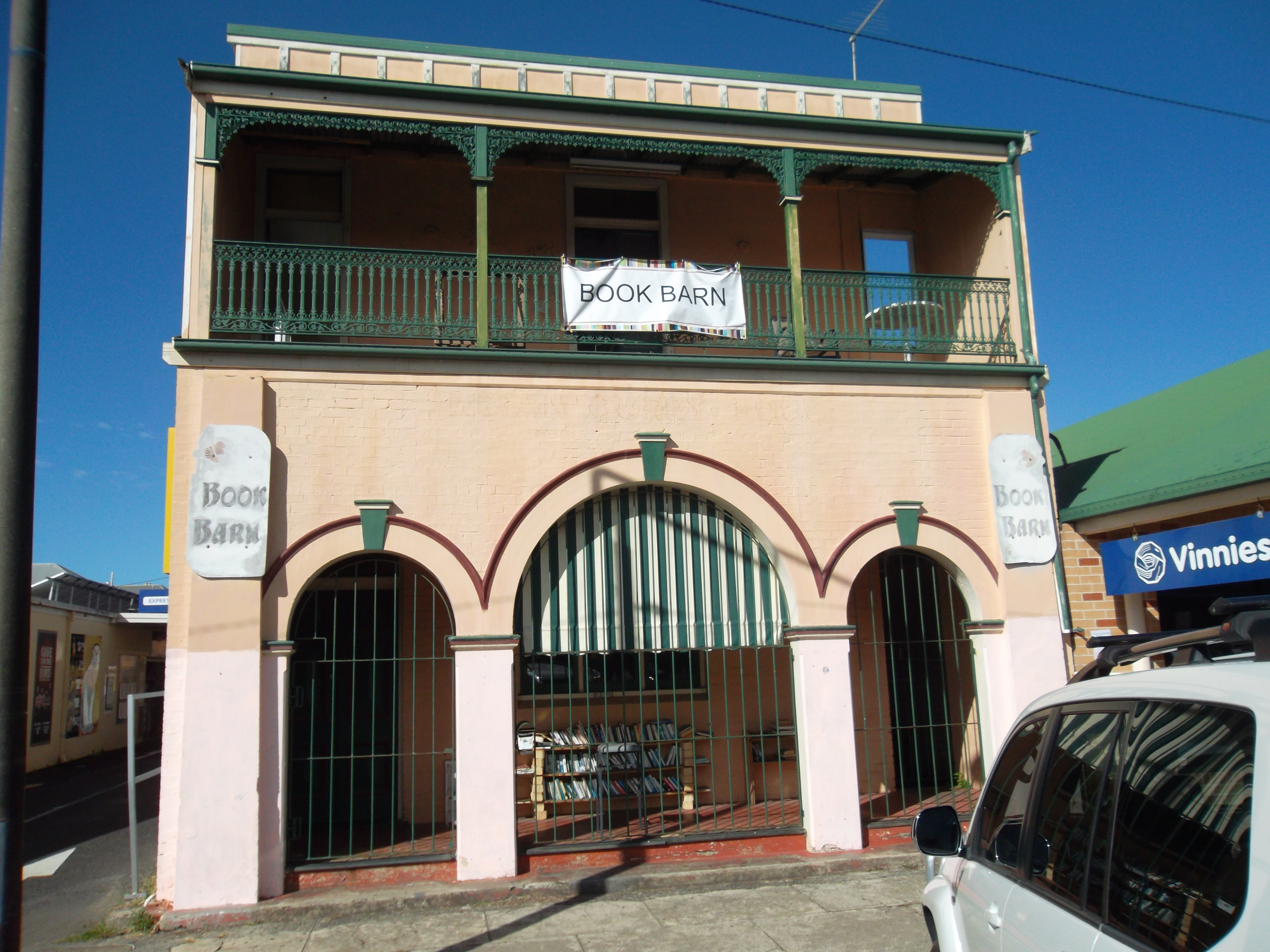
A Mullumbimby bookstore

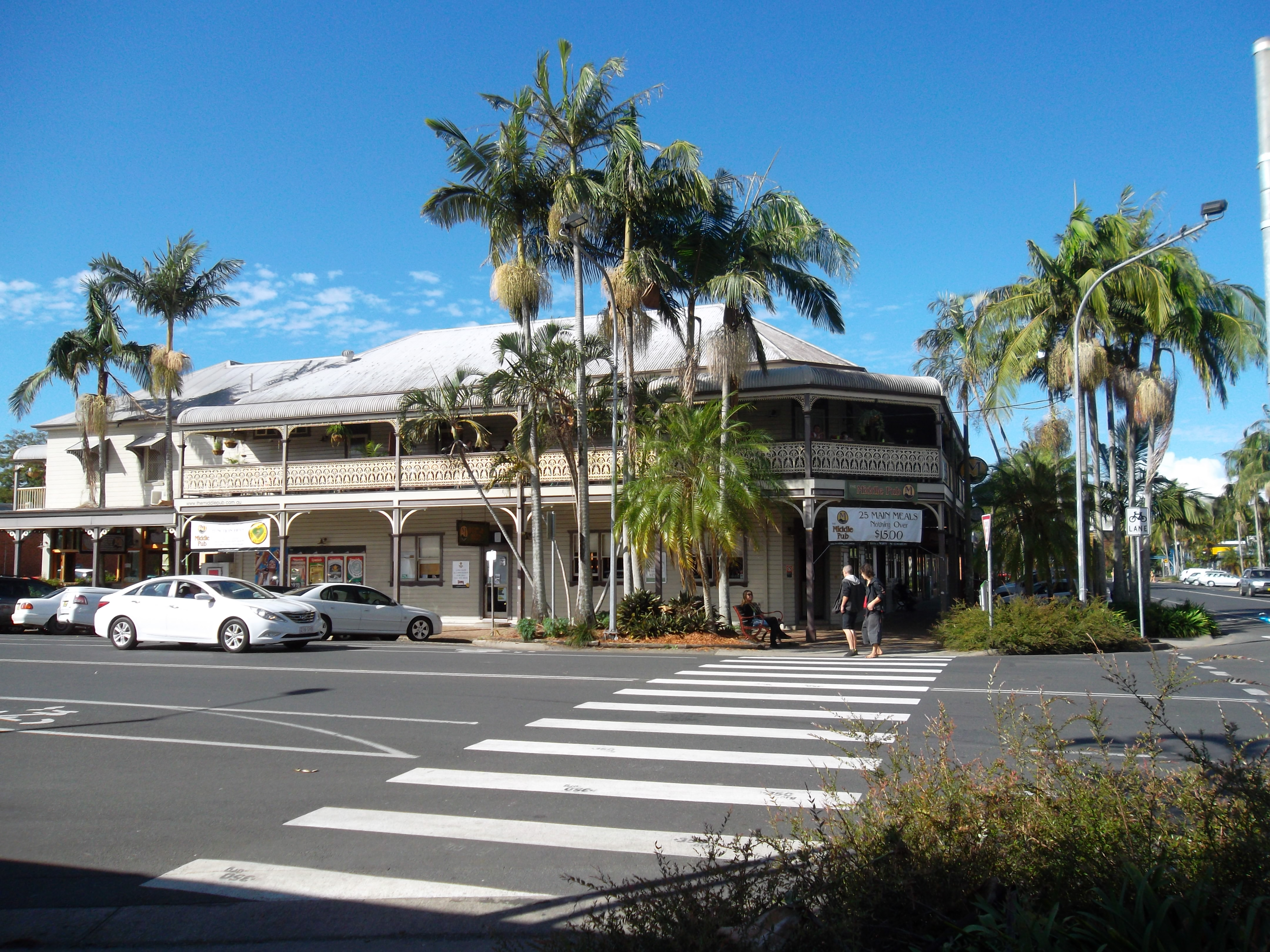
The Middle Pub

Mullumbimby was a separate municipality from 1908 until 1980 when it was forced to amalgamate with the Byron Shire. The Byron Shire Council offices were relocated to Mullumbimby in September 1996.

Byron Shire, including Mullumbimby and nearby Byron Bay, became a centre of alternative or counter culture alongside the extant mainstream culture in the 1970s and 1980s, and remains so today. The male choir Dustyesky performs Russian-language folk songs and received major coverage on the Russian television broadcaster Channel One.

Once the most notable specimens of the valuable timber trees had been collected (most notably red cedar, but also Australian teak, hoop pine, rosewood, silky oak and black and red bean), the Big Scrub timber trade collapsed and Mullumbimby became primarily a farming community. Like many areas of the Big Scrub, allotments were given in Mullumbimby and the surrounding areas by the New South Wales government on the condition that the owners cleared the land for agricultural use. Beef and dairy, along with bananas and sugar cane have traditionally been the notable products of the area. However, the subdivision of many of the larger farms and the emergence of numerous small scale farmers has led to a higher diversity of products. A weekly farmers' market has been developed to exhibit local produce.

A static inverter plant of HVDC Directlink is located at Laverty's Gap near Mullumbimby. This inverter plant was previously the site of a 288 kW hydroelectric power scheme that powered Mullumbimby, Byron Bay and Bangalow from 1926, using water from a weir in nearby Wilsons Creek. The scheme was the fourth hydro electric power station in NSW and only the fifth on mainland Australia. Powering Mullumbimby for the first time in 1925, the scheme made Mullumbimby one of the first country towns in NSW to receive electricity. Although decommissioned in 1990, it is now of state heritage significance. The hydroelectric scheme was designed by William Corin (1867–1929). The site is being considered for pumped-storage hydroelectricity.

The Mullumbimby Star, which was published under a number of names over its history, was a newspaper published in the town from 1902 to 1982.

== Heritage listings ==
Mullumbimby has several heritage-listed sites and the controversial Slater mounds have been nominated as local heritage. The best known heritage sites include:

- Wilsons Creek Road: Mullumbimby Hydro-electric Power Station Complex

== Population ==
Historical population
Year	Pop.	±%
1921	1,329	—
1933	1,362	+2.5%
1947	1,609	+18.1%
1954	2,017	+25.4%
1961	1,966	−2.5%
1966	1,981	+0.8%
1971	1,891	−4.5%
1976	2,028	+7.2%
1981	2,234	+10.2%
1986	2,453	+9.8%
1991	2,612	+6.5%
1996	2,870	+9.9%
2001	2,989	+4.1%
2006	3,129	+4.7%
2011	3,164	+1.1%
2016	3,248	+2.7%
2021	3,589	+10.5%
Source: Australian Bureau of Statistics data.

In the 2021 Census, there were 3,589 people in Mullumbimby. 70.4% of people were born in Australia and the next most common countries of birth were England at 5.9%, New Zealand at 1.9% and Germany at 1.6%. 81.0% of people spoke only English at home.

The most common response for religion was No Religion at 59.2%, followed by Not stated 10.3%, Catholic 7.7%, Anglican 5.9% and Buddhism 2.9%.

Aboriginal and/or Torres Strait Islander people made up 1.8% of the population in 2016. English, Australian, Irish, Scottish and German are the most common ancestries.

== Geography ==
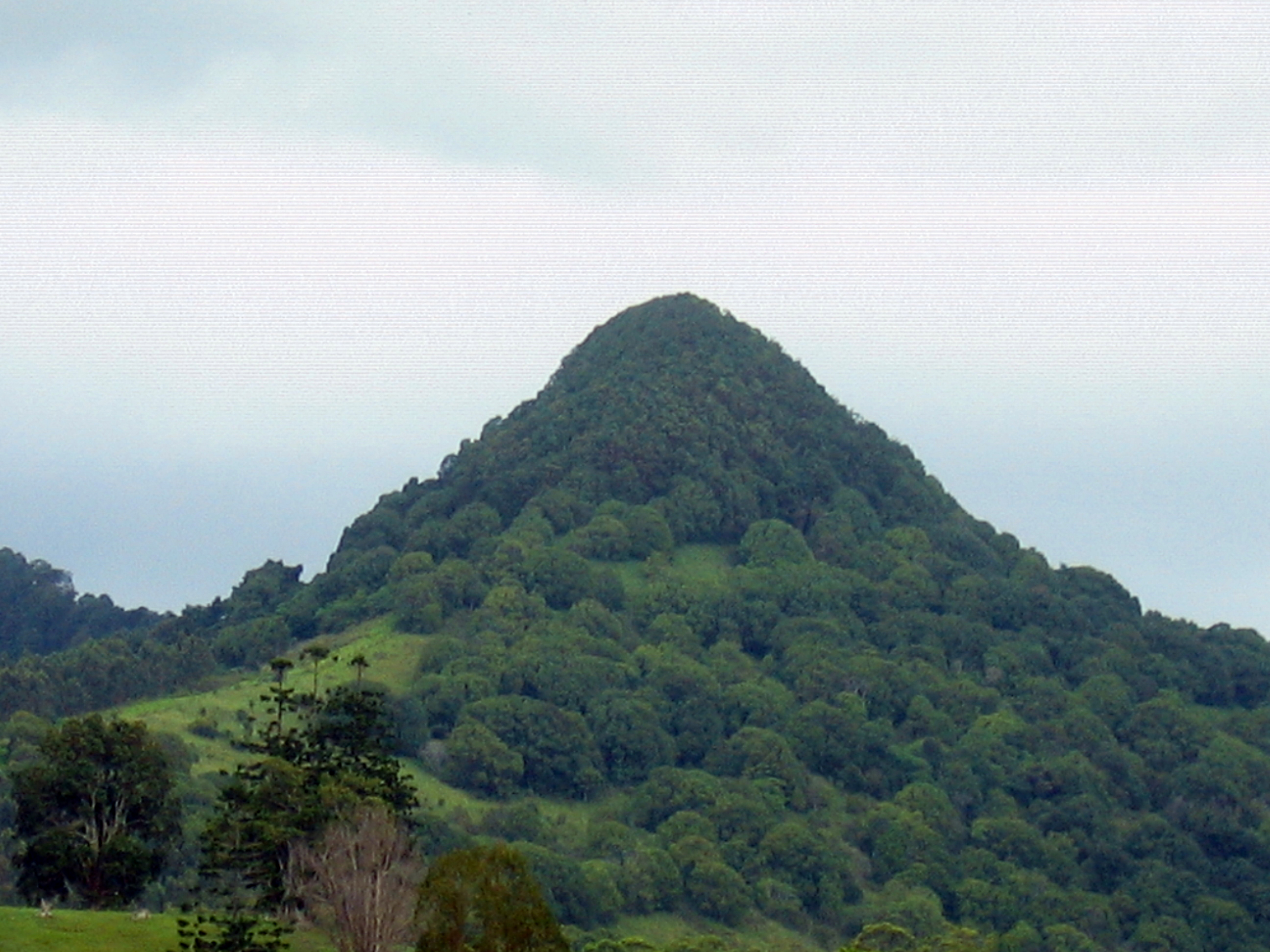
Mount Chincogan

Mullumbimby is about 4 kilometres (2 mi) west of the Pacific Highway, near where the now closed Murwillumbah railway line crosses the Brunswick River.

A major geographical feature of Mullumbimby is Mount Chincogan, which was a minor lava plug of the now extinct Tweed shield volcano, while the nearby Mount Warning (Wollumbin) was the main plug; both of these mountains were once known as the 'twin peaks'. This is also a sacred women's site for the Bundjalung people.

== Conspiracy theorism ==
Mullumbimby is a hotspot for conspiracy theorists in Australia. Many locals are hippies or live alternative lifestyles. The town has low vaccination rates and many locals have protested against vaccines, 5G technology and water fluoridation amongst other causes.

== Health ==
Mullumbimby is a hot spot for the anti-vaccination movement. As of 2013, the town's vaccination rate was the lowest in Australia, with only 46% to 49% of children aged one, two and five years old in the 2482 postcode fully immunised, in contrast with a state average in the low 90s. In Mullumbimby, between 2015 and 2016 only 52% of five year olds were fully vaccinated, compared to the national average at the time of 92.9%. Richmond Valley, a region close to Mullumbimby, had the lowest overall vaccination rate, in part due to a high number of "conscientious objectors" to the practice. Health officials have cited education and timely reminders as key factors in improving the vaccination rate.

The Byron Shire, in which Mullumbimby is situated, is also the only remaining local government area in the Northern Rivers region to reject fluoridation of its water supply.

During the COVID-19 pandemic, despite state government-mandated restrictions, many businesses in Mullumbimby welcomed unvaccinated and unmasked individuals into their businesses, saying that the mandates imposed by the government were discriminatory.

== Sport and recreation ==
The Mullumbimby Giants is the local rugby league club that competes in the Northern Rivers Regional Rugby League competition.

== Notable people ==
- Vic Armbruster, Australian rugby league player (1902–1984).
- Iggy Azalea, Grammy-nominated multi-platinum selling rapper, songwriter and model (born 1990); her stage name was partially inspired by Mullumbimby's Azalea Street, where her childhood home was located.
- Bob Bellear, first Aboriginal judge in Australia (1944–2005).
- Renee Bargh, Australian TV presenter (born 1986).
- Doug Deitz, rugby league player (1914–1994).
- Jy Hitchcox, rugby league player (born 1989).
- Cody Nelson, rugby league player (born 1988).
- Audrey Oldfield, children's writer and historian (1925–2010).
- Amy Taylor, lead singer Amyl and the Sniffers (born 1996).
- Petria Thomas, swimming Olympic gold medallist (born 1975).
- Joel Turner, beatboxer, singer, songwriter, instrumentalist and record producer (born 1987).
- Edwin Wilson, author of Mullumbimby Dreaming and The Mullumbimby Kid (1942–2022).
- Mark Lewis, filmmaker.
- Mandy Nolan, comedian, writer and Australian Greens candidate for Richmond.

== See also ==
- Northern Rivers
- Mullumbimby (novel)
- Shearwater, The Mullumbimby Steiner School
- 2022 eastern Australia floods
- Mullumbimby plum
