= Gara River Hydro-Electric Scheme =

Former hydroelectric power station

- Location within New South Wales Location within Australia
- 30.5996°S 151.8081°E
- Location: 10km southeast of Armidale, Castle Doyle, Armidale Regional Council, New South Wales, Australia

History
- Built: 1893–1895

Site notes
- Architect: Richard Threlfall
- Owner: Office of Environment and Heritage

New South Wales Heritage Register
- Official name: Gara River Hydro-Electric Scheme
- Type: state heritage (archaeological-terrestrial)
- Designated: 2 April 1999
- Reference no.: 986
- Type: Electricity Generator/Power Station - hydro-electric
- Category: Utilities - Electricity
- Builders: Crompton Power Company

Gara River Hydro-Electric Scheme is a heritage-listed former hydroelectric power station located at Castle Doyle in the New England region of New South Wales, Australia. It was designed by Richard Threlfall and built from 1893 to 1895 by Crompton Power Company. The property is owned by the State Government's Office of Environment and Heritage. It was added to the New South Wales State Heritage Register on 2 April 1999.

== History ==
The Gara River scheme was the first substantial hydro-electric scheme to reach fruition in Australia. It began to generate power in March 1895 to light the town of Hillgrove, near Armidale in the New South Wales Central Tablelands. The scheme was instigated by the Australasian Rights Purchase Association, when they placed a petition for a bill before the Parliament of New South Wales, requesting the water rights to exploit the Gara River for the purposes of power generation. The bill was passed and on March 10, 1893, the Hillgrove and Armidale Water-Power Electrical Company (Ltd) Act, was passed.

Richard Threlfall, Professor of Physics at the University of Sydney, was brought in as the consultant on electrical engineering. He was regarded at the time as Australia's leading expert on electricity and is now thought to have been one of the first modern pure physicists in the world. He was involved in all phases of the design and construction and became mortgagee of the company.

The dam for the scheme was constructed at Blue Hole, a large natural pool of water off the Gara River. The generator site was situated at the foot of the Gara Falls. The site was only disadvantaged by its distance from the power consumers in the next gorge and the township. The system used DC (direct current) generators and briefly became one of the most important DC generation schemes in the world.

Although the scheme was hailed as a technical triumph, it was plagued by financial trouble throughout the 1890s. This may have coincided with the economic decline that hailed the end of the goldrushes in the area. In 1896 the site was taken over by the Sandon County Electrical Light and Power Company and in 1899, the scheme was substantially rebuilt and reactivated with modifications to the flumes and machinery. The population of the area however, was dwindling due to reduced mineral production and the Sandon Company sold the plant to the International Railway Corporation of England. By 1905 it was being leased or operated by a Mr Pinto who sold the electricity to local users.

The last mention of the Gara River Hydro-Electric Scheme as a functioning enterprise was in 1907. The history of the site between 1907 and the later part of the twentieth century is unclear. The site now rests within the borders of the Oxley Wild Rivers National Park, under the management of the NSW National Parks and Wildlife Service.

== Description ==
The two ends of the rubble and earth dam at Blue Hole survive although it is not possible to determine which particular parts of the dam were built during the first or second phases of construction. Approximately 100m below the dam is a low concrete weir which spans the Gara River at one of its narrowest points. This was to divert water from the river into the flume at a certain rate to ensure constant supply. The weir remains intact and does not show any evidence of repair or alteration since its construction.

From the eastern end of the weir, a line of V sectioned concrete fluming extends southwards for 500m. After passing through a cutting the flume splits, with one half running on wooden trestles and the other following the fall of the land. The former is the original route of the flume. None of the timber fluming or framing of the trestles survives intact although many lie around the surface of the site. Stone footing supply the best evidence of the route. The second flume is represented by a narrow level surface about one metre across.

At the end of the flume runs, a steep, poorly stabilized slope leads down to the powerstation below. The remains of the power station and sections of the power generating machinery are in various stages of decay.

=== Condition ===
The archaeological potential of the site was reported as being high as of 11 August 1997.

== Heritage listing ==
The Gara River hydro-electric scheme is of state and national significance because it was the first to light a township in Australia and the first to offer its power for commercial sale. As designed by Richard Threlfall, Professor of Physics at the University of Sydney, it incorporated technological innovations which made it one of the most advanced schemes in the world.

It provides direct physical evidence of the changing economic fortunes of Hillgrove in the face of the 1890s depression, the drop in antimony prices and the drought. For modern Australian society, it provides a time depth for the environmental debates of hydro versus environment.

Gara River Hydro-Electric Scheme was listed on the New South Wales State Heritage Register on 2 April 1999 having satisfied the following criteria.

The place is important in demonstrating the course, or pattern, of cultural or natural history in New South Wales.

The Gara River Hydro-electric scheme provides direct evidence for the early use of electricity in Australia. It was the first scheme in Australia to provide light to a town and the first to make its output commercially available for industry. It represents the only successful venture of the Australasian Purchase Rights Association. It has an association with the NSW parliamentarian, Frank Cotton, who acted as manager for the revived Gara River scheme. It also has an association with Richard Threlfall, Professor of physics at the University of Sydney.

The place has strong or special association with a particular community or cultural group in New South Wales for social, cultural or spiritual reasons.

The Gara River Hydro-electric scheme, represents a part of the historical heritage of the New England district and still has relevance to the local community. It has long been used as a recreational area by the residents of Armidale. It also provides a time depth for the wider community, for the development of hydro-electricity and its conflict with the environment. This has become increasingly relevant since the Franklin River dam protests in 1983–4.

The place has potential to yield information that will contribute to an understanding of the cultural or natural history of New South Wales.

The Gara River Hydro-electric scheme represents several technological firsts, such as the first use of tandem hydro-electric power generating machines in Australia. Technologically it was also a world leader in the use of high voltage power transmission. The overall design, the use of direct current generators and the changes in fluming to improve water flow also have high technological significance. The scheme represents the only known large scale design work carried out by Professor Threlfall, a significant early physicist.

The Gara River Hydro-electric scheme also has research and educational potential. There is enough easily accessible material, visible on the surface to provide for straightforward interpretation. As the records of early hydro-electric development are patchy, the archaeological remains are an invaluable source of information about this technology. A study of the place also reveals how the end of the antimony boom and the collapse of the Australian economy in the 1890s, influenced the local economy of Hillgrove.
