= Country Energy =

Australian energy company

- Type: Private (retail subsidiary of Origin Energy)
- Industry: Utility
- Predecessor: Great Southern Energy; NorthPower; Advance Energy
- Founded: 2001
- Headquarters: Port Macquarie, New South Wales, Australia
- Area served: New South Wales; Victoria; Queensland; South Australia; Australian Capital Territory
- Services: Electricity retail Natural gas retail
- Revenue: ▲ A$2.3 billion (2008)
- Net income: ▼ A$23.2 million (2008)
- Total assets: ▲ A$4.6 billion at 2008-06-30
- Total equity: ▼ A$0.9 billion at 2008-06-30
- Number of employees: 4,000
- Parent: Origin Energy
- Website: www.countryenergy.com.au

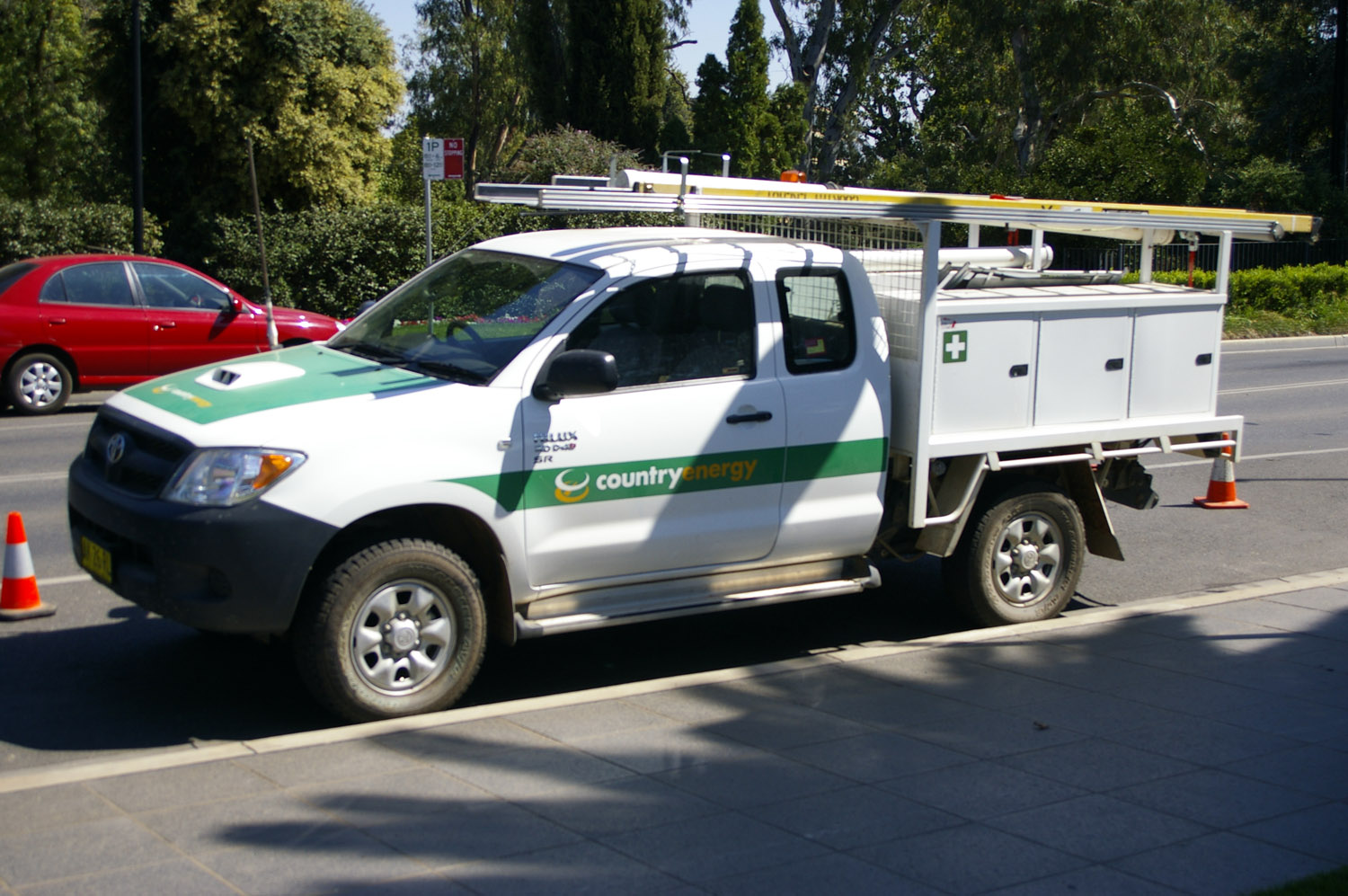
Country Energy utility vehicle

Country Energy, an Australian energy retail subsidiary of Origin Energy, provides natural gas and electricity to retail customers in New South Wales, Victoria, Queensland, South Australia and the Australian Capital Territory.. Since its establishment in 2001 and until 28 February 2011, Country Energy was owned by the Government of New South Wales.

== History ==
On 1 July 2001 Country Energy was formed by the merger of New South Wales rural-based energy retailers, Great Southern Energy, Advance Energy and Northpower - all statutory owned by the Government of New South Wales. In addition to electricity retailing, Country Energy operated Australia's largest electricity distribution network by area, covering 95% of the area of New South Wales as well as extending into small parts of Queensland and Victoria. It was one of developers of Directlink, a high voltage direct current electricity transmission line between New South Wales and Queensland transmission grids.

In October 2010, Country Energy sold its natural gas network to Envestra Limited for A$108.6 million, which includes 65 kilometres (40 mi) of transmission and 1,160 kilometres (720 mi) of distribution pipelines.

On 15 December 2010, the New South Wales Treasurer, Eric Roozendaal, announced that the retail division of Country Energy (including the Country Energy brand) was sold to Origin Energy as part of a A$3.25 billion deal. As part of the sale of the retail business the electricity distribution division was separated from Country Energy and re-branded as Essential Energy on 1 March 2011.

== Operations ==
Country Energy has 870,000 customers, and annual revenues of $2.3 billion. It provides natural gas and electricity to retail customers in New South Wales, Victoria, Queensland, South Australia, and the Australian Capital Territory. The two contact centres are located in the New South Wales cities of Port Macquarie and Leeton.
