= Stephens Creek Dam =

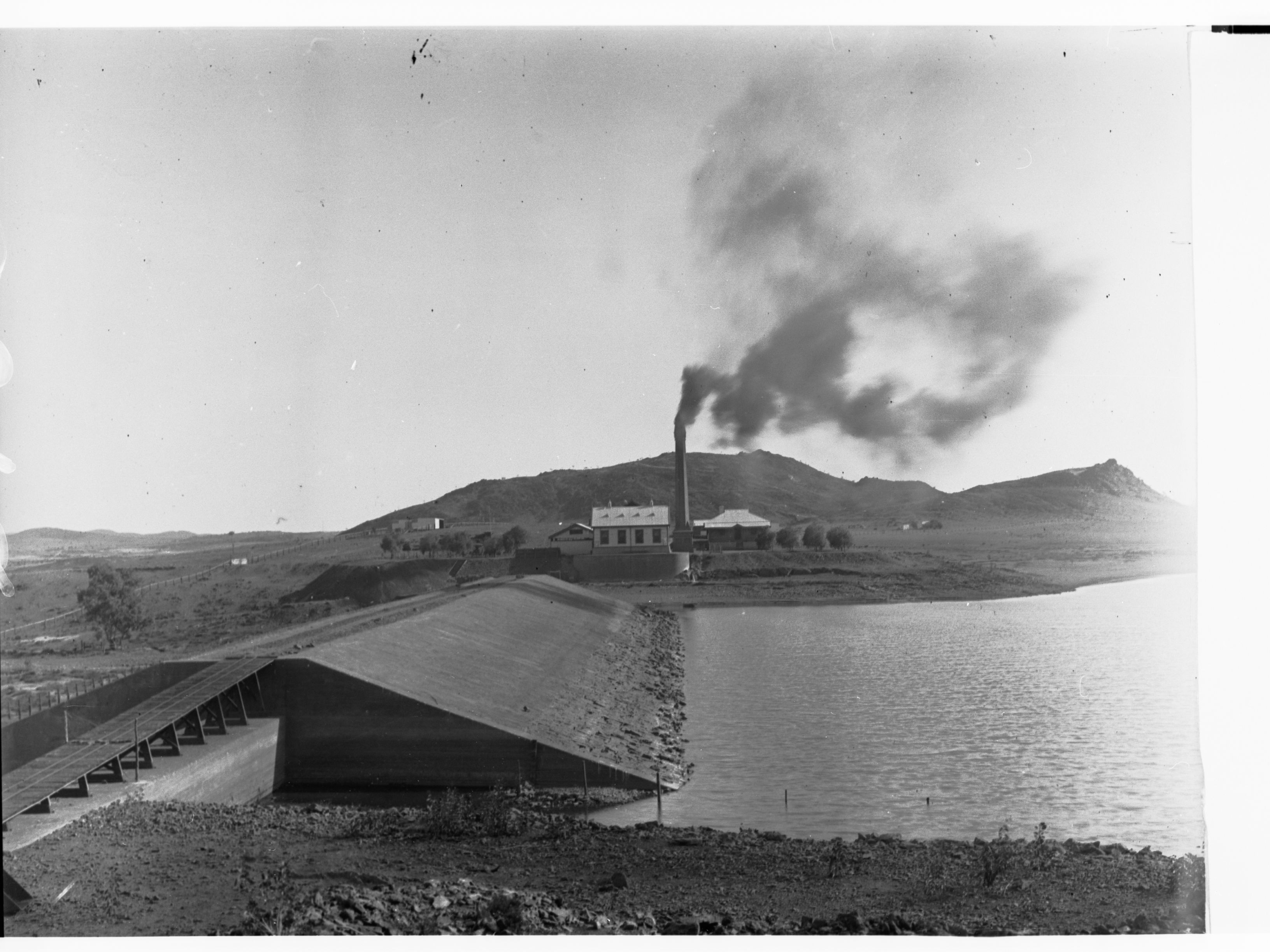
- Embankment of Stevens Creek, Broken Hill Reservoir, circa 1910

- Location of the Stephens Creek Dam in New South Wales
- Country: Australia
- Location: Far West, New South Wales
- Coordinates: 31°52′26″S 141°34′55″E
- Purpose: Potable water supply
- Status: Operational
- Opening date: 1892
- Owner: Essential Energy

Dam and spillways
- Type of dam: Embankment dam
- Impounds: Stephens Creek
- Height: 15 m (49 ft)
- Length: 140 m (460 ft)
- Dam volume: 112×10^{3} m^{3} (4.0×10^{6} cu ft)
- Spillway type: Uncontrolled
- Spillway capacity: 900 m^{3}/s (32,000 cu ft/s)

Reservoir
- Creates: Stephens Creek Reservoir
- Total capacity: 2,000 ML (71×10^{6} cu ft)
- Catchment area: 512 km^{2} (198 sq mi)
- Surface area: 8.5 km^{2} (3.3 sq mi)

The Stephens Creek Dam is an earth-filled embankment dam built on a rock foundation with an uncontrolled spillway across the Stephens Creek, located in the Far West region of New South Wales, Australia. The principal purpose of the dam is to supply potable water for the town of Broken Hill. The impounded 2,000-megalitre (71×10^{6} cu ft) reservoir is called Stephens Creek Reservoir.

== Location and features ==
The dam was completed in 1892 by the Broken Hill Water Supply Company to provide a continuing water source for drought-ridden Broken Hill. The reservoir soon became inadequate and a further reservoir, Umberumberka, was built to add to the water supply. Stephens Creek Reservoir remains the primary water source for Broken Hill, a city of around 20,000 people and is a popular picnic area.

The height of the dam wall is 15 metres (49 ft), and 140 metres (460 ft) in length. The earth-filled embankment wall is 112×10^{3} m^{3} (4.0×10^{6} cu ft) by volume. The uncontrolled spillway discharges overflow at the rate of 900 cubic metres per second (32,000 cu ft/s). The reservoir has a maximum storage capacity of 2,000 megalitres (71×10^{6} cu ft), over a surface area of 8.5 square kilometres (3.3 sq mi), and drawn from a catchment area of 510 square kilometres (200 sq mi).

The facility is owned and operated by Essential Energy, which, prior to 2004 was Australian Inland Energy and Water.

== See also ==
- List of reservoirs and dams in New South Wales
