= Mullumbimby Star =

Newspaper in New South Wales, Australia

- Founder: J.H. Plowright
- Language: English

The Mullumbimby Star was a newspaper published in Mullumbimby, New South Wales, Australia, under various names from 1902 to 1982.

== History ==
The Mullumbimby Star was first published in 1902 in Mullumbimby, New South Wales by J.H. Plowright. The paper was published under several names during its history.

Masthead	Years of publication
Mullumbimby Star	1902-1936
Mullumbimby Star and Byron Bay-Bangalow Advocate	1936-1950
Star Advocate	1950-1964
Brunswick and Byron Advocate	1964-1976
The Advocate	1976-1977
North Coast Advocate	1977-1978
North Coast Advocate and Summerland News	1978-1982

== Digitisation ==
This paper has been digitised as part of the Australian Newspapers Digitisation Program project of the National Library of Australia.

== See also ==
- List of newspapers in Australia
- List of newspapers in New South Wales
