= Audrey Oldfield =

Australian children's writer and historian

- Born: Audrey Phyllis Parkes; 6 October 1925; Mullumbimby, New South Wales
- Died: 27 October 2010 (aged 85); Miranda, New South Wales, Australia
- Occupation: Children's writer and historian

Audrey Oldfield (6 October 1925 – 27 October 2010) was an Australian children's writer and historian of suffrage and republicanism.

A sixth generation Australian, Audrey Phyllis Oldfield was born in Mullumbimby, New South Wales, to butcher Joseph Parkes and Eileen, née Browne.

She was educated at Grafton High School and won a scholarship to Sydney Teachers' College from which she graduated in 1945 and began her teaching career. In 1949 she married Alan Oldfield and continued teaching until the birth of her children. She later became a teacher/librarian at Woolooware Public School and later still at Burraneer Bay Public School.

Her first novel for children was published in 1970. Daughter of Two Worlds tracks the life of a part-Aboriginal girl and the challenges she faces at school in Perth. Her second novel, Baroola and Us, covers a city family moving to the country and appeared in 1973.

Her study Woman Suffrage in Australia: A Gift or a Struggle? (1992) was warmly reviewed by historian Patricia Grimshaw as 'informative, judicious and persuasive', in the Journal of Imperial and Commonwealth History (vol 22, 2). Grimshaw wrote that it 'filled a vital place in the country's historiography, and in the history of the western suffrage movement'.

== Awards ==
In 1993, Oldfield won a CH Currey Memorial Fellowship, giving her open access to original sources held in the Mitchell Library and the resources of the State Library of New South Wales as a whole.

== Works ==
- Daughter of Two Worlds (1970)
- Baroola and Us (1973)
- Woman Suffrage in Australia: A Gift or a Struggle? (1992)
- Australian Women and the Vote (1994)
- The Great Republic of the Southern Seas: Republicans in Nineteenth-Century Australia (1999)
