= Shearwater, The Mullumbimby Steiner School =

Shearwater, the Mullumbimby Steiner School
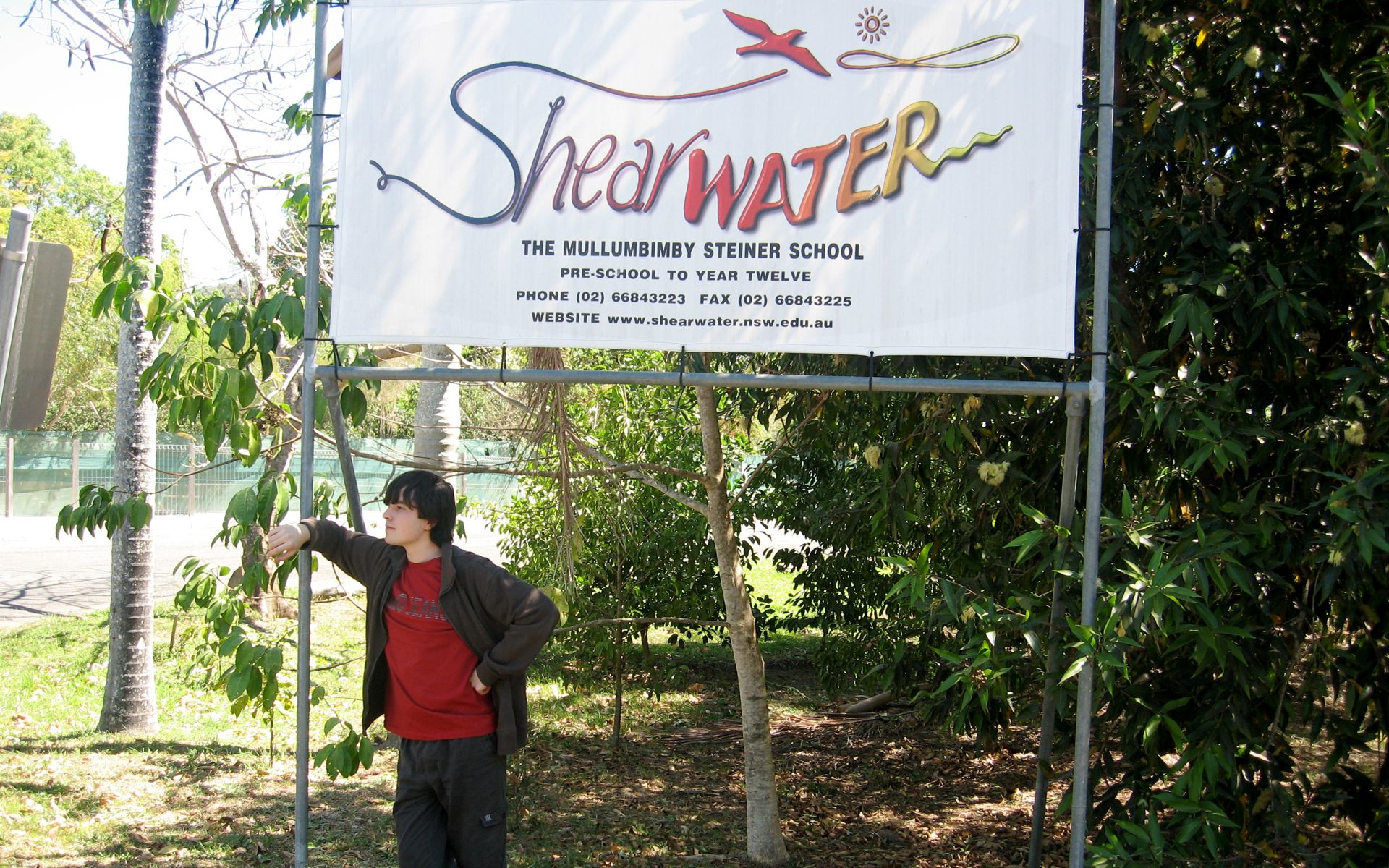

Location
- 349 Left Bank Rd, Mullumbimby, NSW; Australia
- Coordinates: 28°33′28″S 153°27′36″E

Information
- Type: Private, Waldorf, pre-school, primary, secondary
- Established: 1993
- Faculty: ~100
- Grades: K–12
- Enrollment: 600
- Information: 02 6684 3223
- Website: www.shearwater.nsw.edu.au

Shearwater, the Mullumbimby Steiner School, also known as Shearwater Steiner School, is an independent co-ed school, in the hinterland of Byron Bay, that provides human-centred education based on Steiner/Waldorf principles and contemporary practises. The School caters for primary and secondary education, Kindergarten through to Year 12, and includes a Preschool and Playgroups for under-sevens. The school is built on Bundjalung Land. It is named after the Shearwater bird.

== History ==
Shearwater was founded on 8 February 1993 as a small community Steiner School for the surrounding regional area. It was originally located in the home of two of the School's founders, Stan Stevens and Sally Davison, offering Kindergarten, Class 1 and Class 2. The school grew and was moved to the current location later in its first year.

== Description ==
The school's 52 acre campus is bordered by Mullumbimby Creek and includes a large biodynamic farm.

The school is known for its seasonal festivals and its annual student-led performing arts event WAVE (Wearable Arts Vision in Education).

== Gallery ==
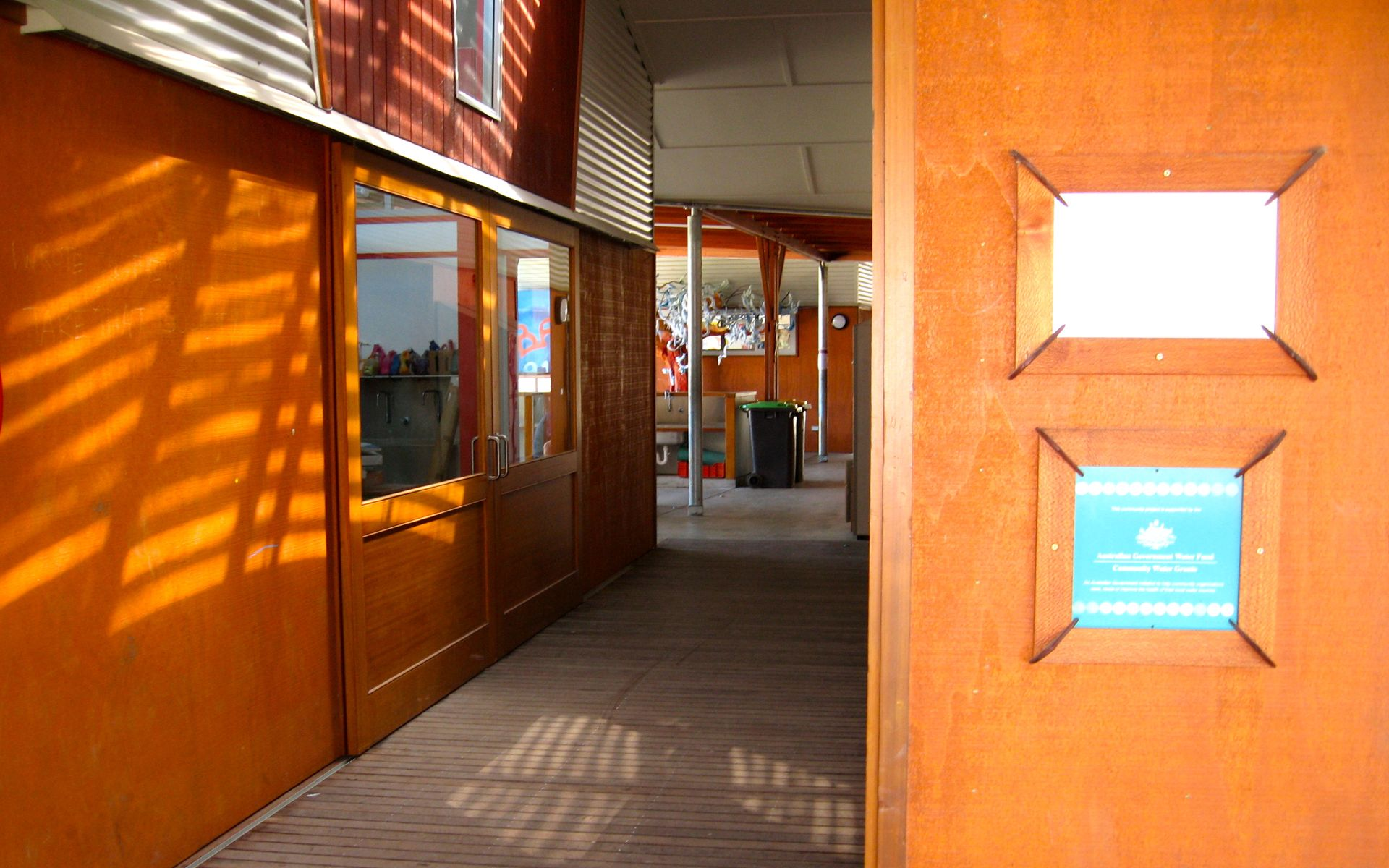
A photograph of the walkway towards the art rooms from the perspective of the science rooms.

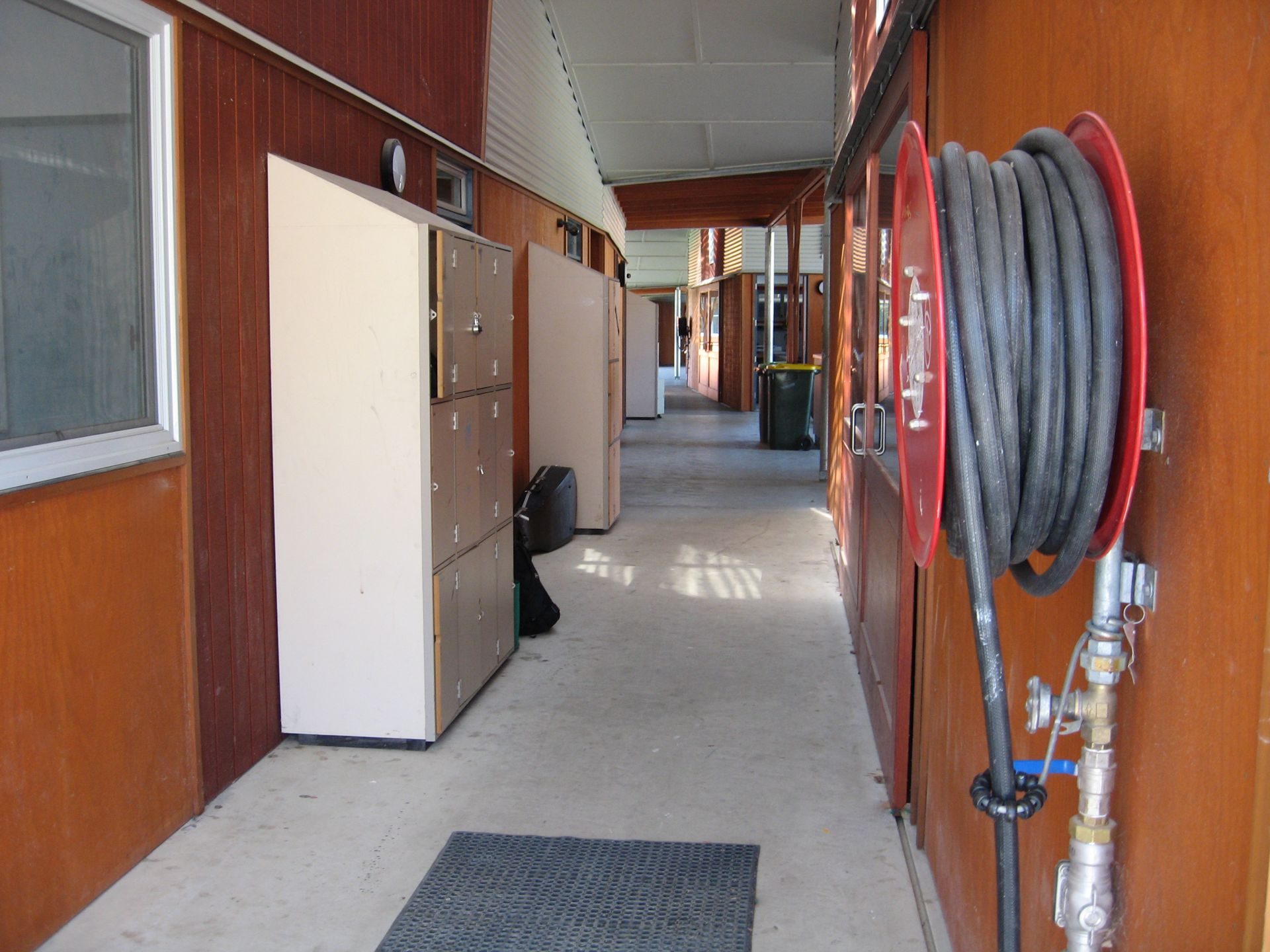
A photograph of the walkway towards the art rooms from the perspective of the Design and Technology (woodwork/metalwork) building.

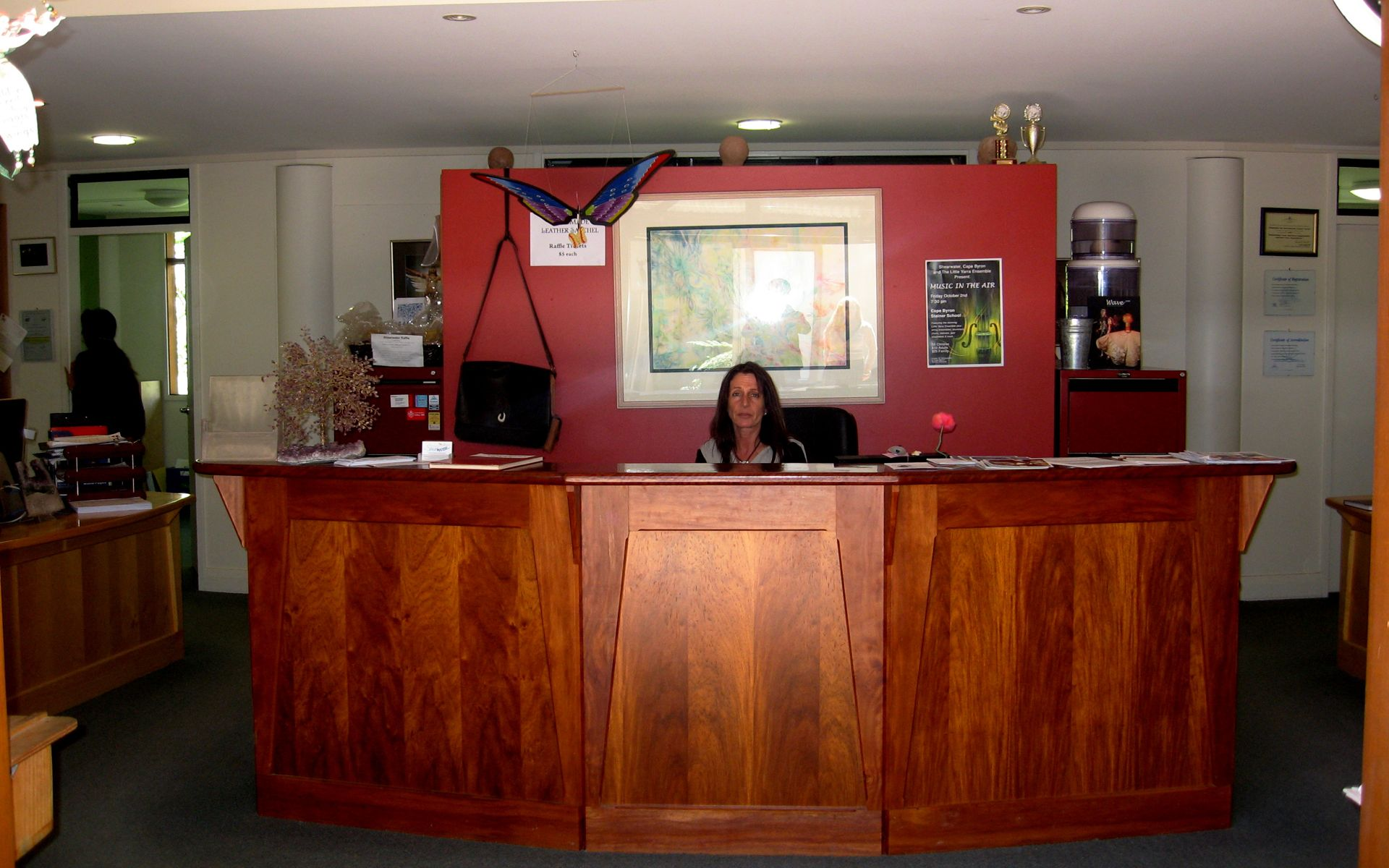
A photograph of the entrance to the administrative office of Shearwater.

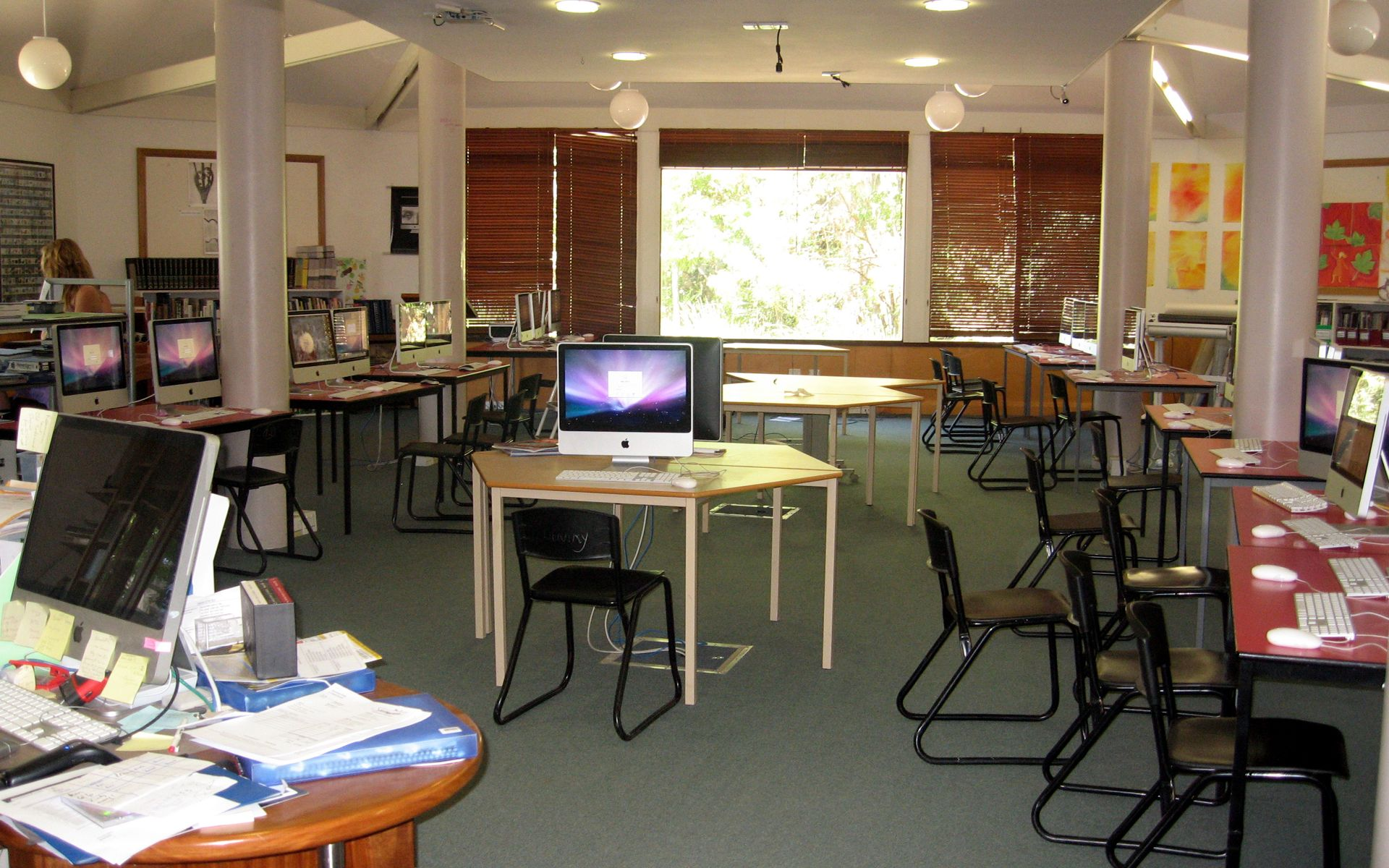
A photograph of the secondary school Library and Media Centre.

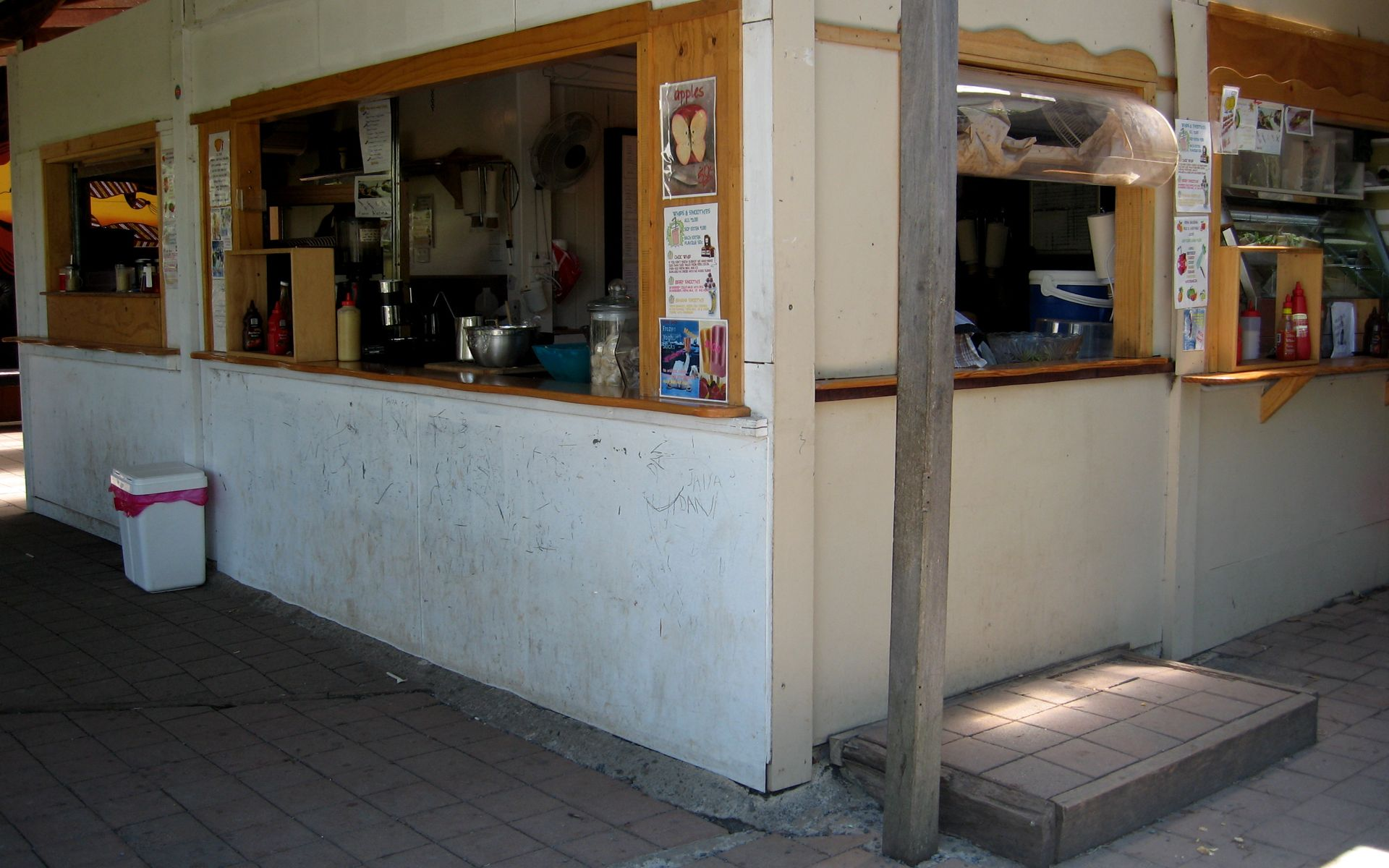
A photograph of the Sheertaste School canteen.

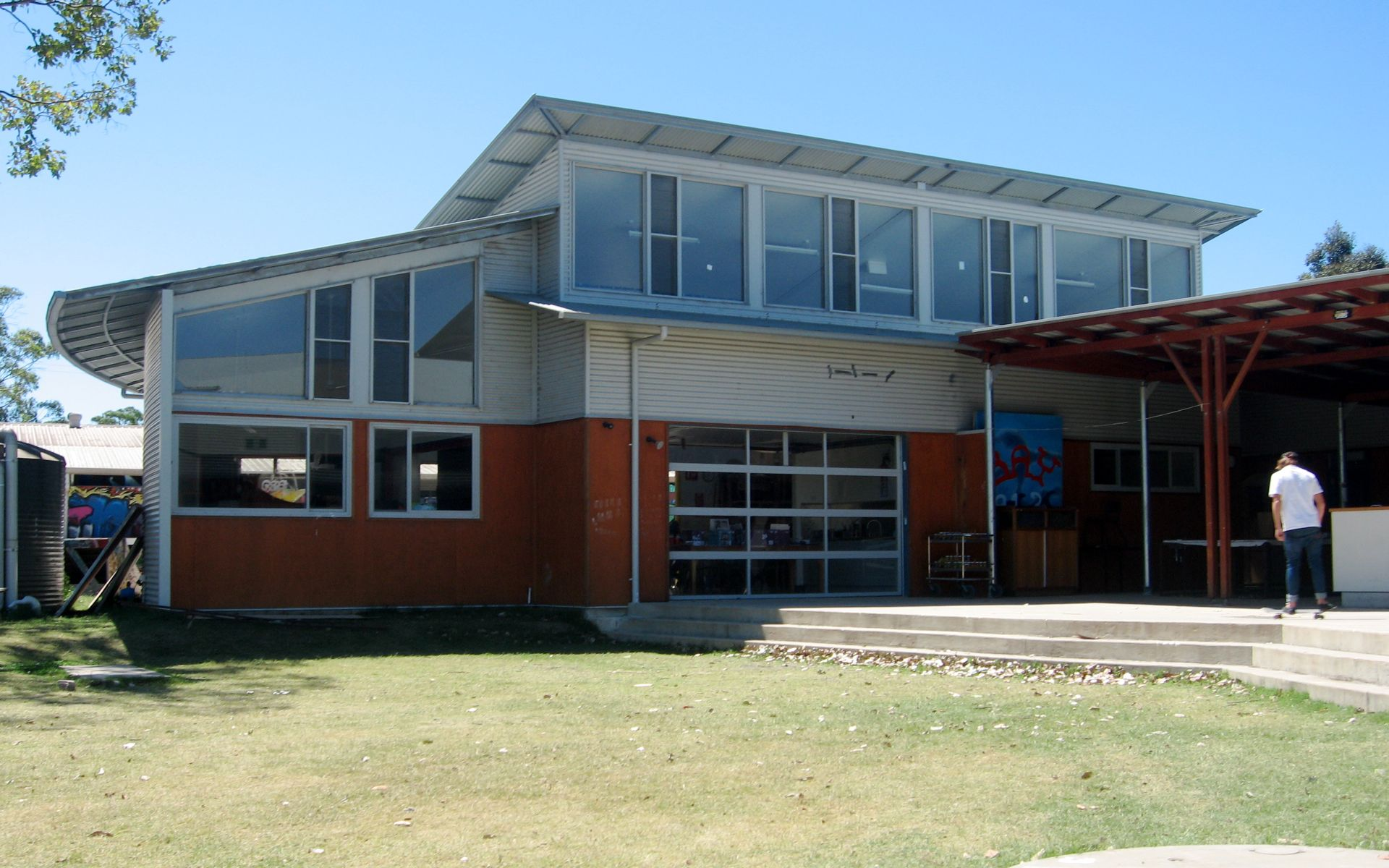
A photograph of a Shearwater art room, specifically designed to avoid a "box" shape.

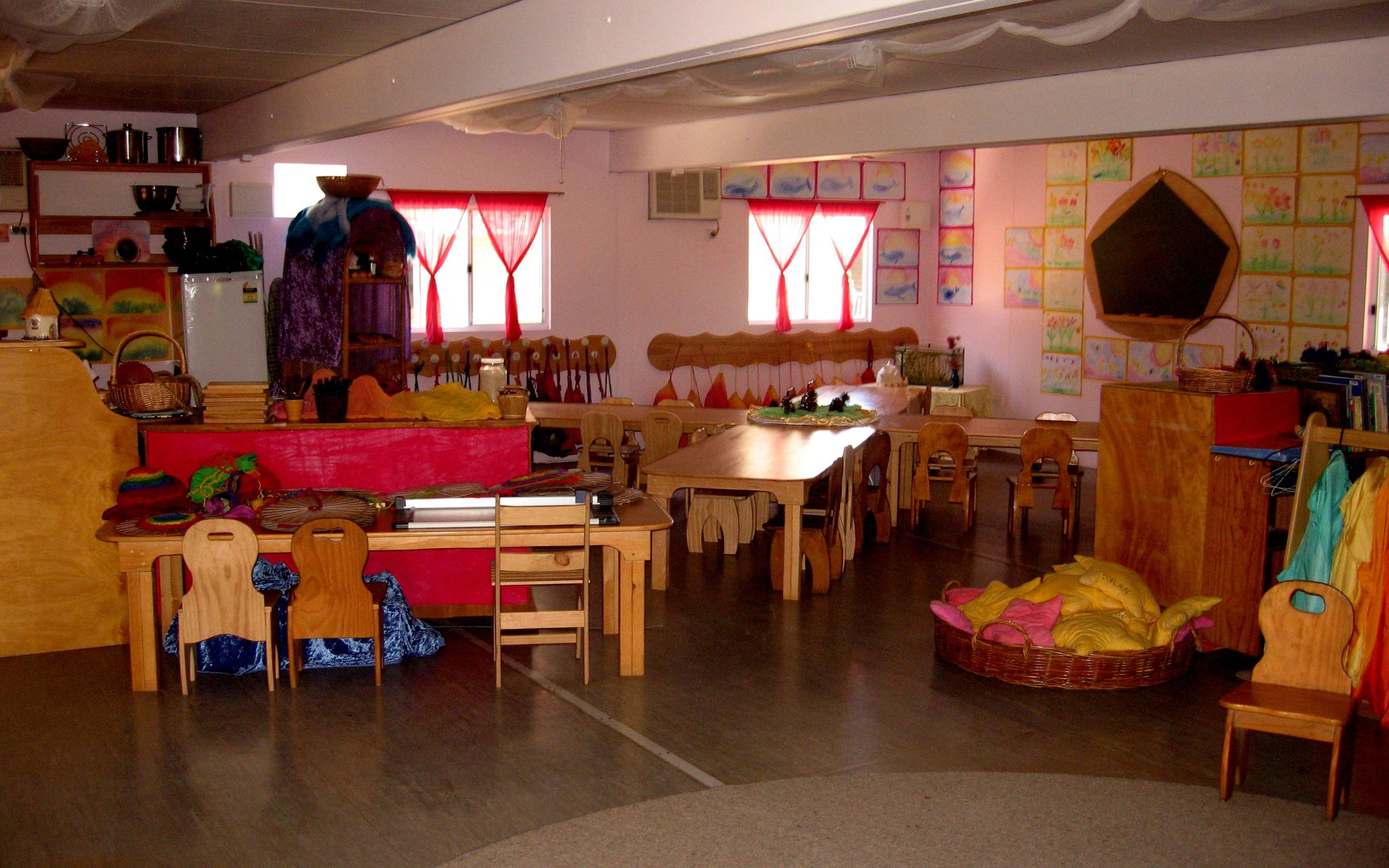
A photograph of the Kindergarten room at Shearwater. The primary school rooms are rather irregular, each designed specifically for those children; note that the desks are in a cross.

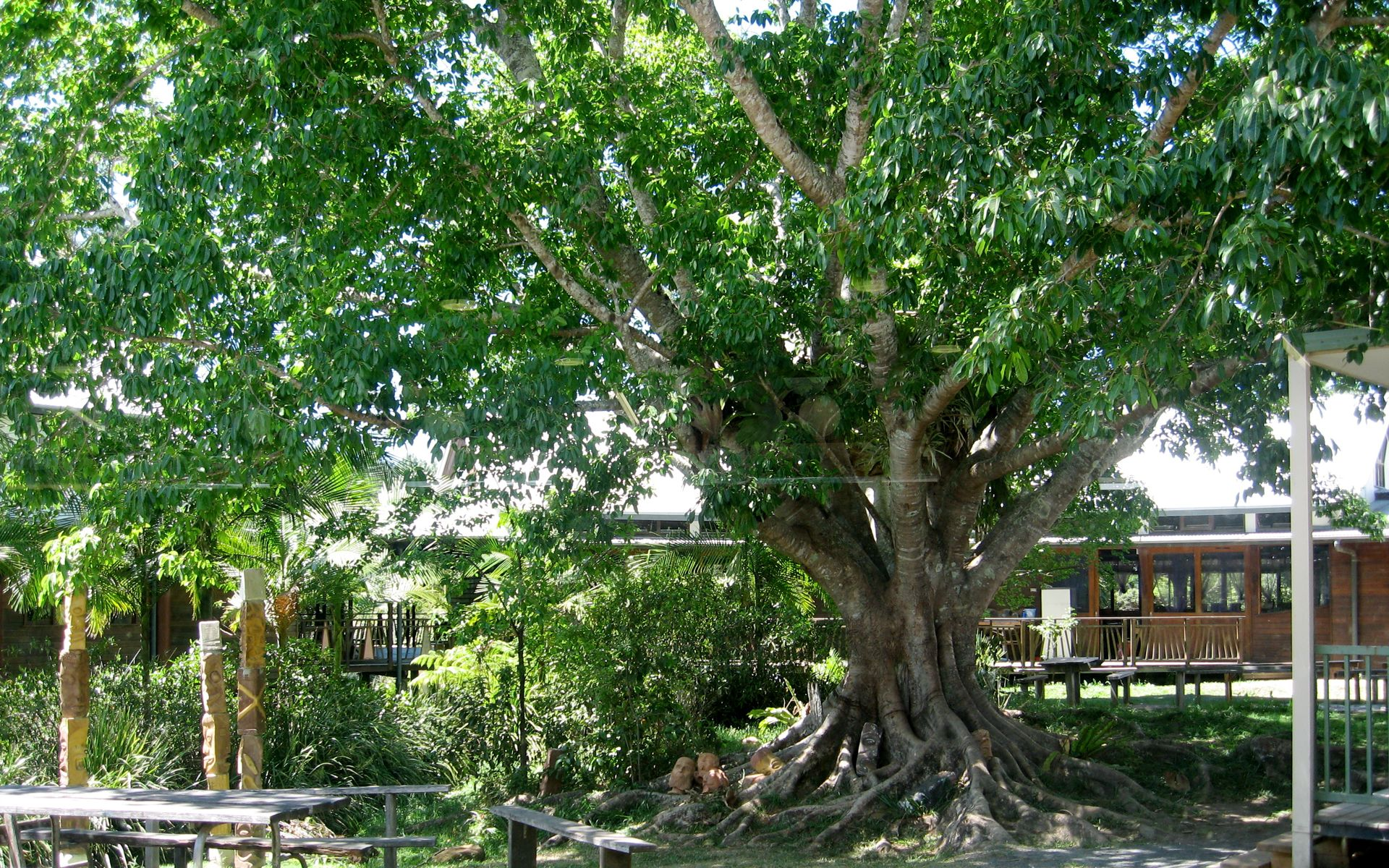
A photograph of the centrepiece fifty-year-old tree at Shearwater, around which the main buildings have been constructed.

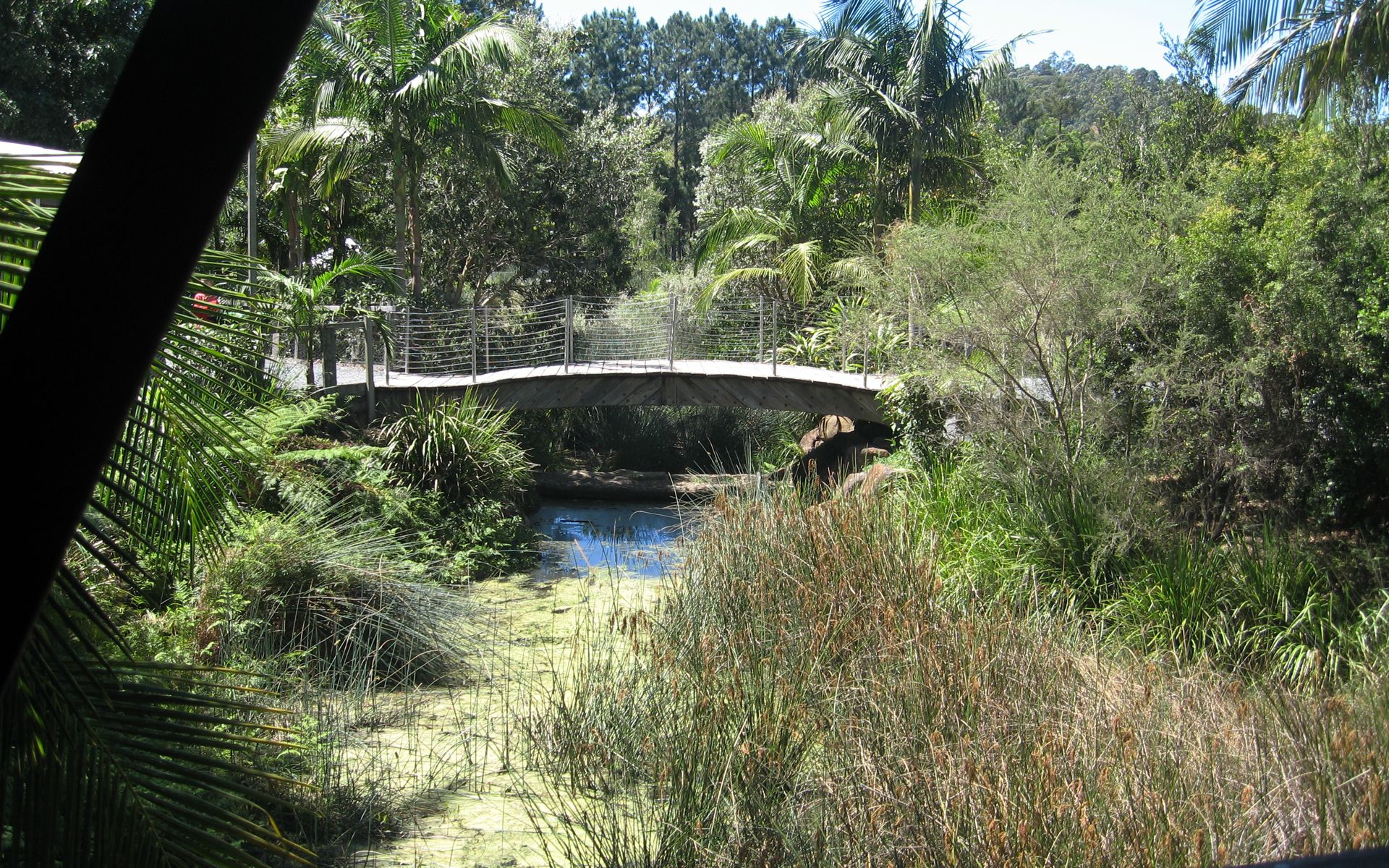
A photograph of the bridge to the primary school buildings across the creek.
