= Mount Chincogan =

Mountain in New South Wales, Australia

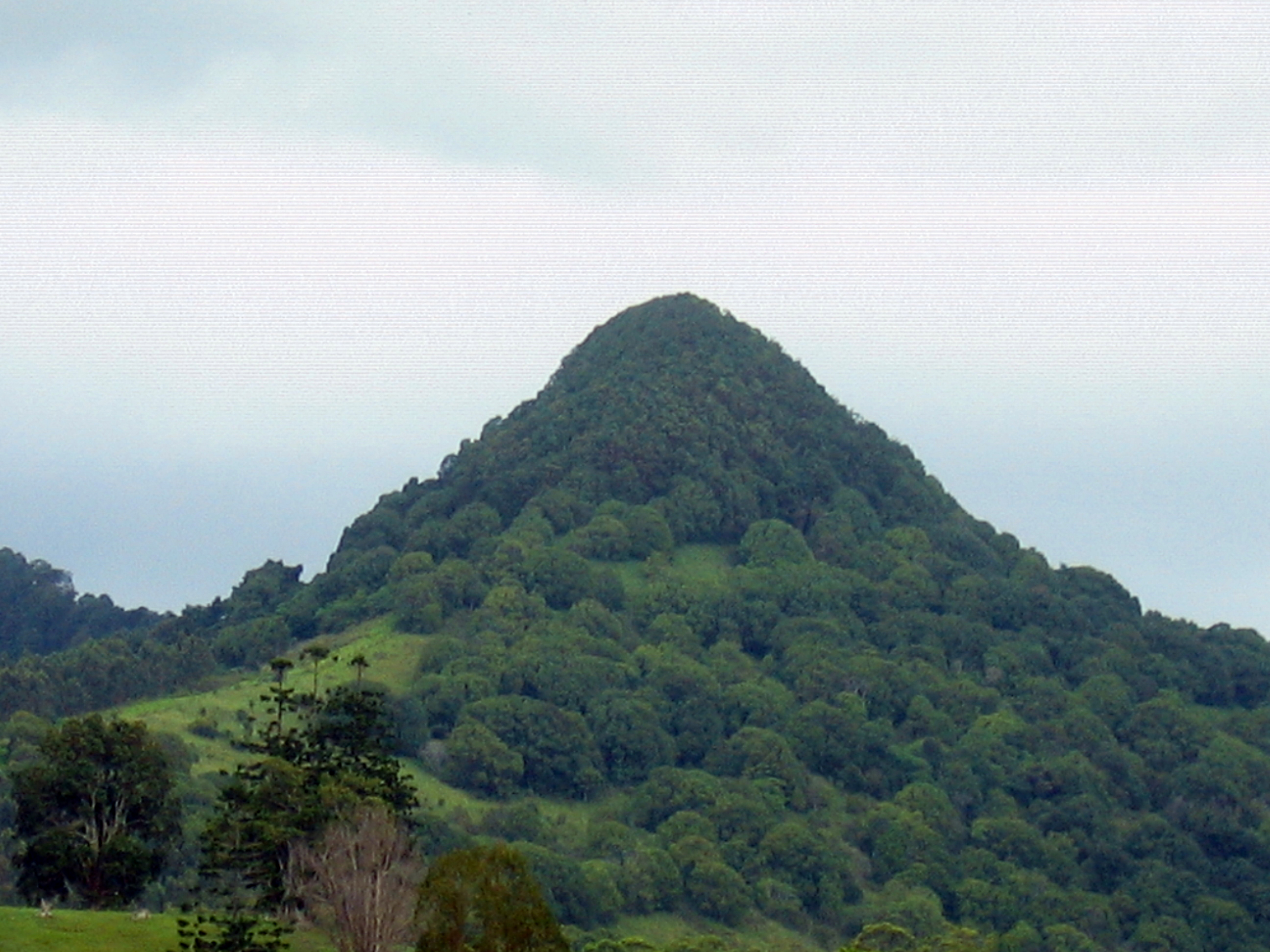

Highest point
- Elevation: 309 m (1,014 ft)
- Listing: Mountains of Australia
- Coordinates: 28°31′46″S 153°29′25″E

Geography
- Location within New South Wales
- Country: Australia
- State: New South Wales
- Parent range: Mullumbimby Range

Geology
- Mountain type: Large hill

Climbing
- Easiest route: Walking track (All private property)

Mount Chincogan (/tʃɪnˈkoʊɡən/) is located northwest of Mullumbimby, New South Wales, Australia and west of Ocean Shores. It was part of a large shield volcano Mount Warning (Wollumbin) which erupted about 23 million years ago. It is a remnant of the crater wall of a large vent of the Volcano (the main vent was located at Mt Warning which is the remnant of the lava plug and magma chambers that eroded at a much slower rate than the surrounding remnants). The curvature of the crater wall is more obvious when viewed from the south and east, e.g. Cape Byron and Brunswick Heads.

It is on the land of the Bundjalung people and is a sacred women's site.

== Origin of place name ==
The name Chincogan is thought to have been derived from a Yugambeh–Bundjalung languages word Thuncogin which is said to mean 'low behind and high in front' although, more specifically it is said to mean 'northward facing male genitals. It is thought that the mountain is likely to have been a fertility site.
