= Commissioners Waters =

Coordinates: 30°34′S 151°45′E

- Etymology: in honour of the first Crown Lands Commissioner in Armidale

Location
- Country: Australia
- State: New South Wales
- Region: New England Tablelands (IBRA), Northern Tablelands
- Local government area: Armidale

Physical characteristics
- Source confluence: Dumaresq Creek and Tilbuster Ponds
  - location: east of Armidale
  - elevation: 972 m (3,189 ft)
- Mouth: confluence with the Gara River
  - elevation: 915 m (3,002 ft)
- Length: 19 km (12 mi)

Basin features
- River system: Macleay River catchment
- Tributaries
  - left: Burying Ground Creek
- National parks: New England NP, Cunnawarra NP

The Commissioners Waters, a watercourse that is part of the Macleay River catchment, is located in the Northern Tablelands region of New South Wales, Australia.

== Course and features ==
Commissioners Waters was formed by the confluence of the Dumaresq Creek and Tilbuster Ponds. Commissioners Waters is located about 4 kilometres (2.5 mi) east of Armidale. The river flows generally to the southeast by south, joined by a minor tributary, before reaching its confluence with the Gara River. The river descends 56 metres (184 ft) over its 19 kilometres (12 mi) course.

The river is traversed by the Waterfall Way, and is named in honour of Commissioner McDonald, the first Commissioner of Crown Lands in Armidale.

== See also ==
- Rivers of New South Wales
- List of rivers of New South Wales (A-K)
- List of rivers of Australia
