= Essential Energy =

Australian state-owned utility

- Essential Energy logo

State-owned statutory corporation overview
- Formed: 1 March 2011
- Preceding State-owned statutory corporation: Country Energy; Australian Inland Energy and Water
- Jurisdiction: Regional, rural and remote New South Wales
- Headquarters: 8 Buller Street, Port Macquarie, New South Wales
- Employees: 3,280 (2023)
- Minister responsible: Penny Sharpe, Minister for Energy and Climate Change
- State-owned statutory corporation executives: Doug Halley, Chair; John Cleland, CEO
- Parent department: Department of Climate Change, Energy, the Environment and Water
- Website: essentialenergy.com.au

Essential Energy is a state-owned electricity infrastructure company which owns, maintains and operates the electrical distribution networks for much of New South Wales, covering 95 percent of the state geography (and some neighbouring parts of Queensland). It also owns the reticulated water network in Broken Hill through Essential Water, formerly Australian Inland Energy and Water.

Essential Energy was formed from the previously state-owned energy business, Country Energy, when the retail division of the company, along with the Country Energy brand, was sold by the NSW Government in 2011 to Origin Energy.

== See also ==
- Stephens Creek Dam
