= William Corin =

British engineer

William Corin (13 October 1867 – 2 March 1929) was an English-born electrical engineer, who undertook some of the early design of the Snowy Mountains Hydro-Electricity Scheme in Australia.

== Career ==
Corin was born in Kent, England and was educated at King's College School and University College, London and graduated in 1885 having won numerous prizes. Following his graduation her worked as a civil engineer until 1891 when he started working as an electrical engineer, appointed as city electrician, with the County of London Electric Supply Company.

On 21 January 1896 he migrated to Launceston in Tasmania and, in Australia his interest in electrical engineering took off. He designed and was the manager of the Duck Reach Power Station and made early surveys for the Great Lakes schemes. In this role he was praised for his high safety standards and, between 1904 and 1907, changed the electricity supply of the city to a three-phase, four wire system. This was one of the first installation of its kind in the Commonwealth.

On 1 July 1907 he was made Chief Electrical Engineer to the New South Wales Department of Public Works as well as being a consulting engineer for the Department of Mines. In this role he was in charge of the generation of thermal electricity for local distribution and he significantly developed the capacity of the Port Kembla Power Station. In 1915 he commenced writing a series of reports on a Snowy River scheme. In 1920 Corin estimated the cost of the Snowy River scheme at £2 million and that it would produce 1,500GwH of power. In this role Corin also worked with both the British and French Governments on projects in Fiji and New Caledonia.

Corin resigned from his government position in December 1923 to focus on his consulting work and, as a consultant, worked primarily to further develop electricity supply in regional New South Wales towns.

He died of cancer in Chatswood, a suburb of Sydney, on 2 March 1929 and is buried in the Northern Suburbs cemetery.

== Memberships ==
Corin was a member of the following processional associations:

- The Institution of Engineers Australia; he joined as a foundation associate member and in 1920 became a full member.
- Electrical Association of Australia, member and former president.
- Institution of Civil Engineers, member and in 1911, through them, he received the Telford Medal, for the paper called The Water Power of Tasmania.
- Institution of Electrical Engineers, member.

== Personal life ==
Soon after Corins arrival in Australia, on 21 January 1896, he married Kathleen Susan Sleeman who he had met before his arrival. Kathleen died in April 1897 after the birth of their daughter.

On 12 March 1900 he married Ellen Louise Unwin and they would have five further children together.

== Legacy ==
Corin Dam in the Australian Capital Territory is named after him.
