= Gara River (Australia) =

Coordinates: 30°38′30″S 151°49′40″E

Gara River Gyra River, Ryanda Creek, Falconer Creek, Malpas Creek
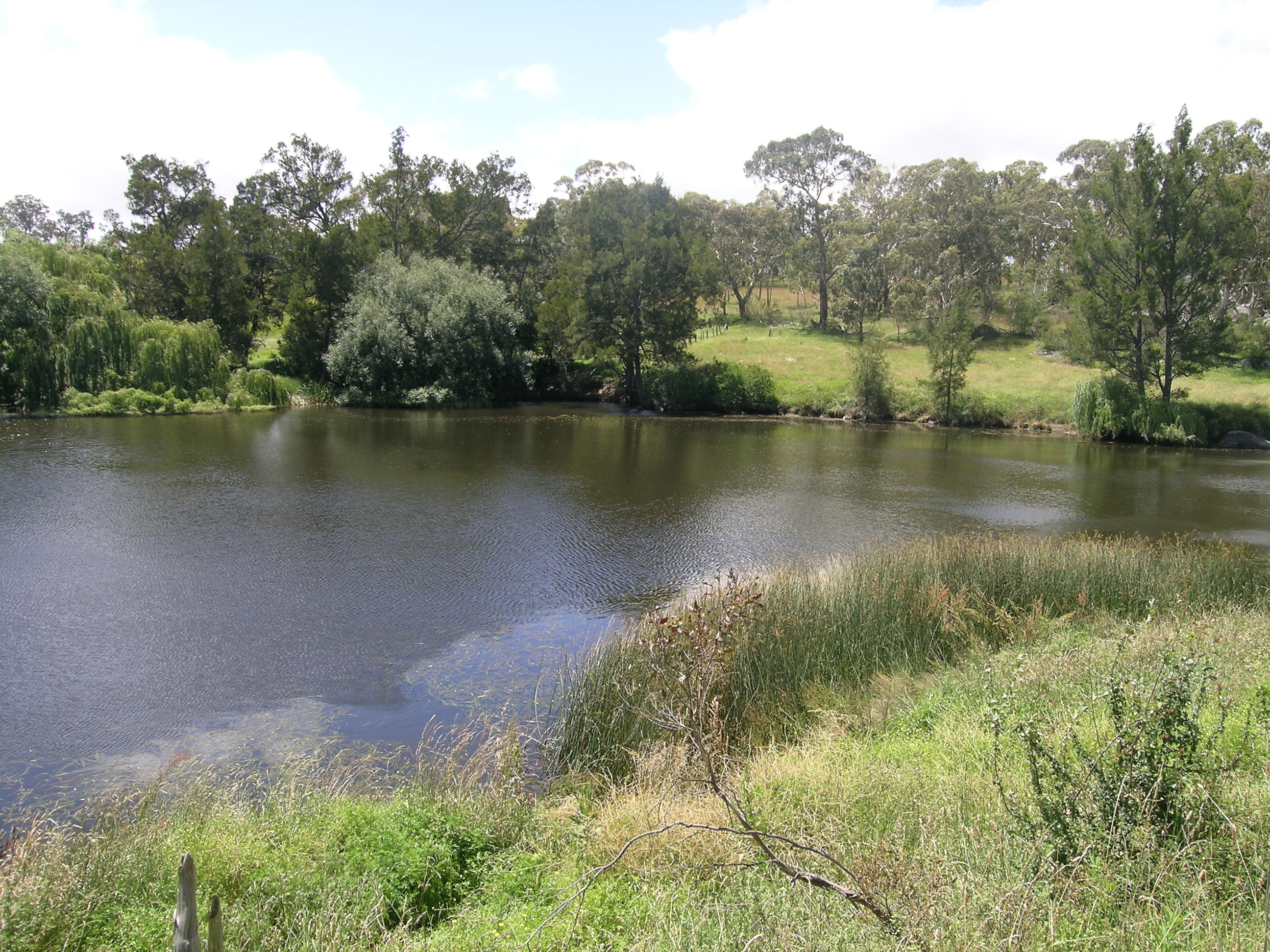
- Blue Hole in the Gara River, near Armidale

Location
- Country: Australia
- State: New South Wales
- Region: New England Tablelands (IBRA), Northern Tablelands
- Local government areas: Guyra, Armidale Dumaresq

Physical characteristics
- Source: Ben Lomond Range, Great Dividing Range
  - location: near Llangothlin
  - elevation: 1,280 m (4,200 ft)
- Mouth: confluence with the Macleay River
  - location: Salisbury Waters within Oxley Wild Rivers National Park, near Armidale
  - elevation: 388 m (1,273 ft)
- Length: 91 km (57 mi)

Basin features
- River system: Macleay River
- Tributaries
  - left: Cooney Creek
  - right: Ryanda Creek, Commissioners Waters, Powers Creek
- National park: Oxley Wild Rivers NP

Gara River, a perennial river that is a tributary of the Macleay River, is located in the Northern Tablelands region of New South Wales, Australia.

== Course and features ==
The river rises at the junction of the southern slopes of the Great Dividing Range and the Ben Lomond Range, near Llangothlin, and flows generally south and southeast, joined by four minor tributaries, until the river reaches a junction with Salisbury Waters within Oxley Wild Rivers National Park and descends to its confluence with the Macleay River, below Blue Nobby Mountain, south east of Armidale. The river descends 892 metres (2,927 ft) over its 91 kilometres (57 mi) course and is impounded by Guyra Dam and Malpas Reservoir.

In its lower reaches, the Gara River is transversed by the Waterfall Way.

== See also ==
- Rivers of New South Wales
- List of rivers of New South Wales (A–K)
- List of rivers of Australia
