= Cape Byron Light =

Lighthouse in New South Wales, Australia

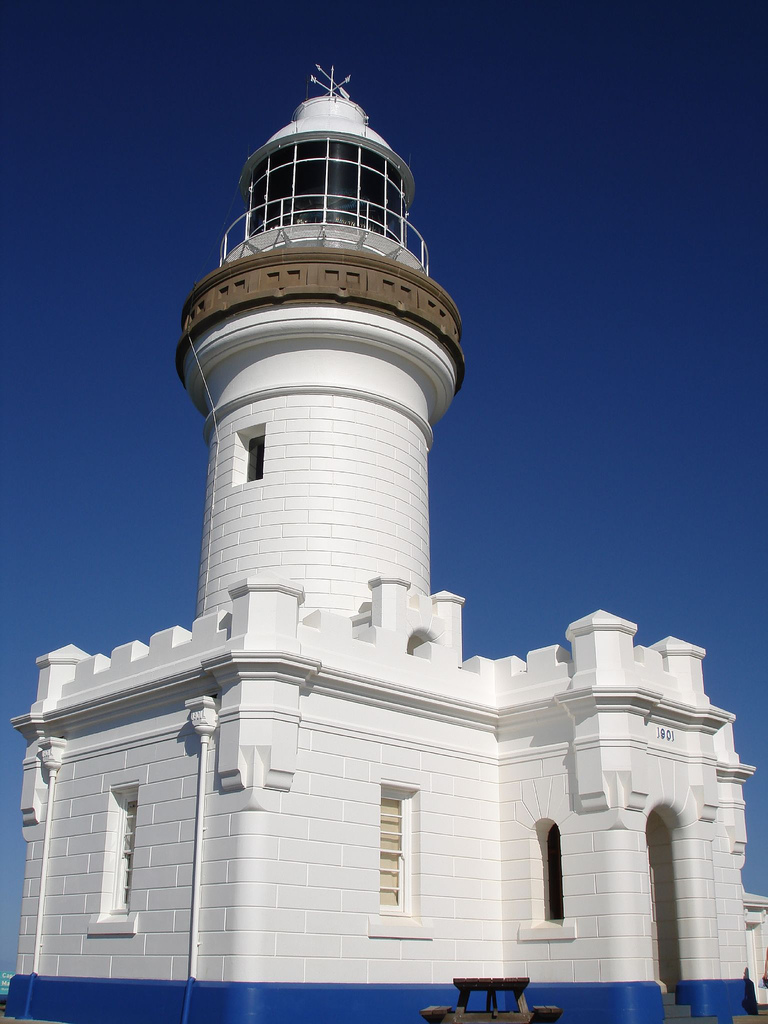
- Cape Byron Light in 2006
- Location: Lighthouse Road, Byron Bay, Cape Byron, Byron Shire, New South Wales, Australia
- Coordinates: 28°38′19″S 153°38′11″E

Tower
- Constructed: 1901
- Designed by: Cecil West Darley
- Construction: Concrete blocks
- Height: 23 metres (74 ft) (Note: According to List of Lights. Rowlett, Cape Byron Headland Reserve, AHD103599 and AHD210 say 22 metres (72 ft), while Lighthouses of Australia Inc says 18 metres (59 ft).)
- Shape: Cylindrical tower with balcony and lantern
- Markings: White tower and lantern
- Operator: Australian Maritime Safety Authority
- Heritage: Heritage Act — State Heritage Register

Light
- Focal height: White: 118 metres (387 ft); Red: 111 metres (364 ft)
- Lens: 1st order Henry-LePaute Fresnel lens
- Light source: Mains power
- Intensity: 2,200,000 candela
- Range: White: 27 nautical miles (50 km; 31 mi); Red: 8 nautical miles (15 km; 9 mi)
- Characteristic: Fl W 15s, F R

History
- Built: 1899–1901

Site notes
- Architects: Charles Harding; Cecil W. Darley
- Owner: NSW National Parks & Wildlife Service

Commonwealth Heritage List
- Official name: Cape Byron Lighthouse, Lighthouse Rd, Byron Bay, NSW, Australia
- Type: Listed place
- Designated: 22 June 2004
- Reference no.: 105599
- Category: Historic

New South Wales Heritage Register
- Official name: Cape Byron Lightstation (including moveable items); Byron Bay Lighthouse; Cape Byron Headland; Cape Byron Headland Reserve
- Type: State heritage (complex / group)
- Designated: 22 February 2019
- Reference no.: 2023
- Type: Lighthouse Tower
- Category: Transport - Water
- Builders: Messrs Mitchell & King

Cape Byron Light, also called Cape Byron Lightstation, is an active heritage-listed lighthouse and now interpretative centre, maritime museum, administration office, retail building, accommodation, tourist attraction and visitor attraction located at Cape Byron on the Far North Coast of New South Wales, Australia. It was designed by Charles Harding and Cecil W. Darley and built from 1899 to 1901 by Messrs Mitchell & King. It is also known as Cape Byron Lightstation (including moveable items), Byron Bay Lighthouse, Cape Byron Headland and Cape Byron Headland Reserve. The property is owned by NSW National Parks & Wildlife Service.

The lighthouse was added to the Commonwealth Heritage List on 22 June 2004; and was added to the New South Wales State Heritage Register on 22 February 2019. The lighthouse and surrounding buildings were added to the (now defunct) Register of the National Estate on 21 October 1980.

Cape Byron Light is Australia's most powerful lighthouse, with a light intensity of 2,200,000 candelas. Cape Byron, the easternmost point of the mainland of Australia, is approximately three kilometres (2 mi) northeast of the town of Byron Bay.

== History ==
=== Prehistory ===
For thousands of years, the Cape Byron headland has been a significant place for the Bundjalung people of Byron Bay. Traditionally known as Cavanba, the cape and its environment provided the local Aboriginal people with physical and spiritual resources which sustained both life and culture.

The Bundjalung people occupied an expansive territory, stretching along the coastline, up the Richmond River and inland. The coastal environment, the hinterland and the rainforest landscapes were rich in resources and sustained a large population within comparatively small tribal boundaries. The environment provided an abundance of marine life, plants and wildlife as food and a diversity of flora and fauna material which could be used for making tools and implements, such as shields, spears, boomerangs, containers and canoes.

As well as physical sustenance, the cape also provided sites for spiritual and cultural practice for the Bundjalung people. For Aboriginal communities, cultural practice maintains an important link between people, their country and the Dreamtime stories and ancestral spirits. These spiritual practices are maintained through rituals, dance, song and painting and are intrinsic to the health, wellbeing and continuation of the people and their traditional culture.

The crest of the Cape Byron headland provided the Bundjalung people with an elevated lookout point for economic, social and religious purposes. There are reports that the Cape Byron headland was traditionally used as an important men's site for ceremony, initiation and lore-making.

=== Colonial history ===
At the most easterly point of mainland Australia, Cape Byron was first observed by Captain James Cook on 15 May 1770, who subsequently named the headland after his fellow navigator Vice-Admiral John Byron, who had been the Commander of HMS Dolphin on its worldwide voyage of exploration of 1764-66. European exploration of northern NSW did not occur, however, until 1826 when Captain Henry John Rous, commander of HMS Rainbow, explored the region seeking navigable rivers and safe anchorage. It was during this period that the first face-to-face contact between the Bundjalung people and the European settlers would have occurred.

European settlement of the Byron Bay region commenced in the 1840s with the arrival of cedar cutters. Attracted by the rich hinterland forest and its proximity to the shipping trade, the Europeans initially maintained a peaceful relationship with the traditional owners but conflict soon arose when pastoralists entered the region, bringing land clearing and stock running with them. As the natural resources had been traditionally and harmoniously used by the Bundjalung people, the incursions into tribal territory by European settlers interrupted a delicate balance in the environment and forcibly pushed Aboriginal people from their tribal lands. With a loss of land, resources and sacred sites, coupled with disruption of the tribal organization of the Bundjalung people and an increasing reliance on European supplies, conflict ensued and the Aboriginal community was decimated by massacres and introduced diseases. As the population plummeted, the Bundjalung people could not withstand the European invasion and, by the settlement of Byron Bay in 1881, many of the surviving Aboriginal people became poorly paid workers for the European settlers as labourers, shepherds, horse breakers, guides, bullock drivers or as domestic help.

By 1883, Byron Bay was becoming a focal point for settlers and was considered the chief cedar trading centre in NSW. After the town was surveyed in 1884, land allotments became available and settlement began in earnest which further contributed to the dislocation of the Bundjalung people from their country. The permanent presence of European people on tribal land was solidified by the official renaming of Cavanba to Byron Bay and the gazettal of the township in 1896.

=== Lighthouse history ===
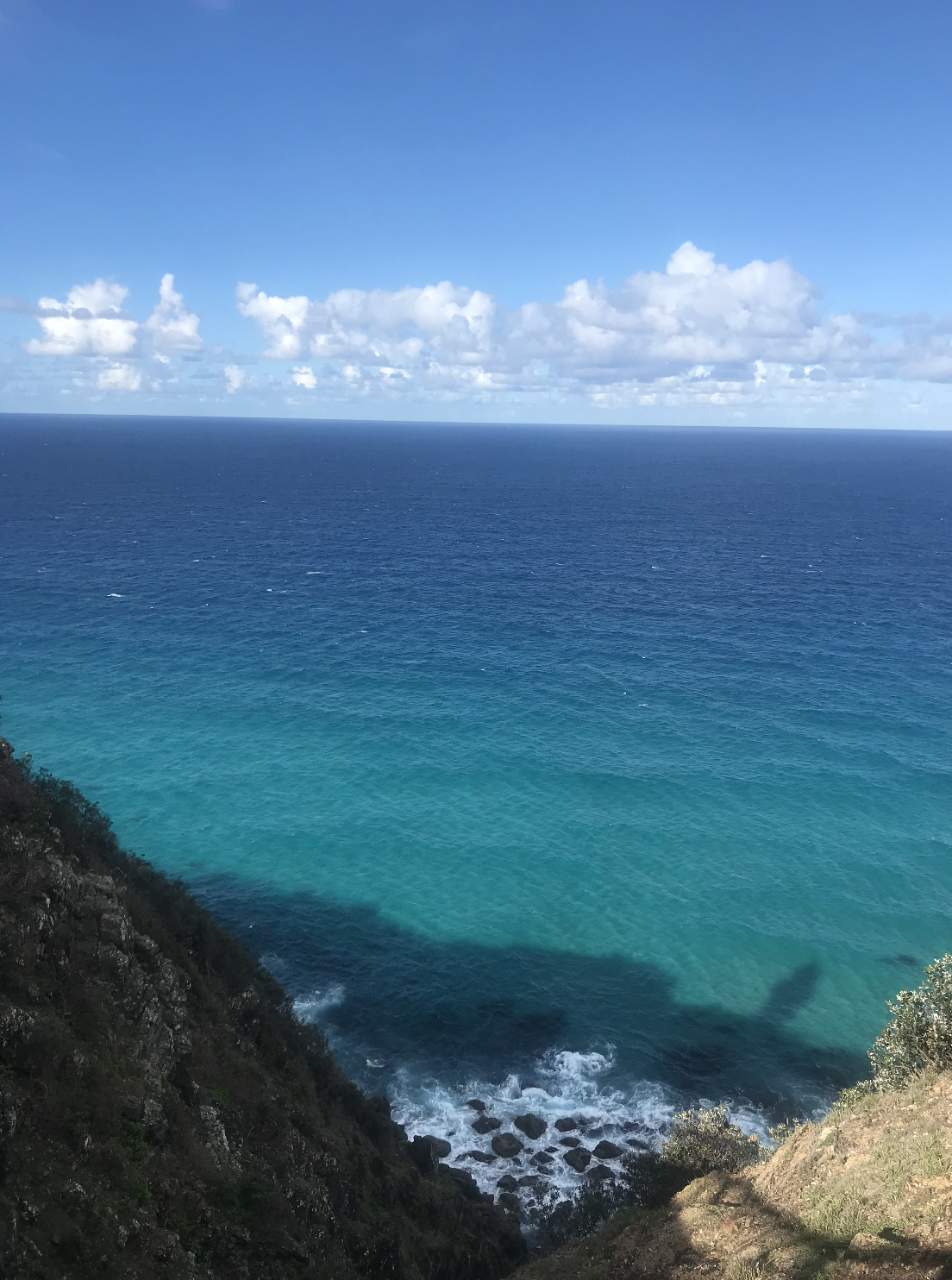
Cape Byron Lighthouse Lookout View

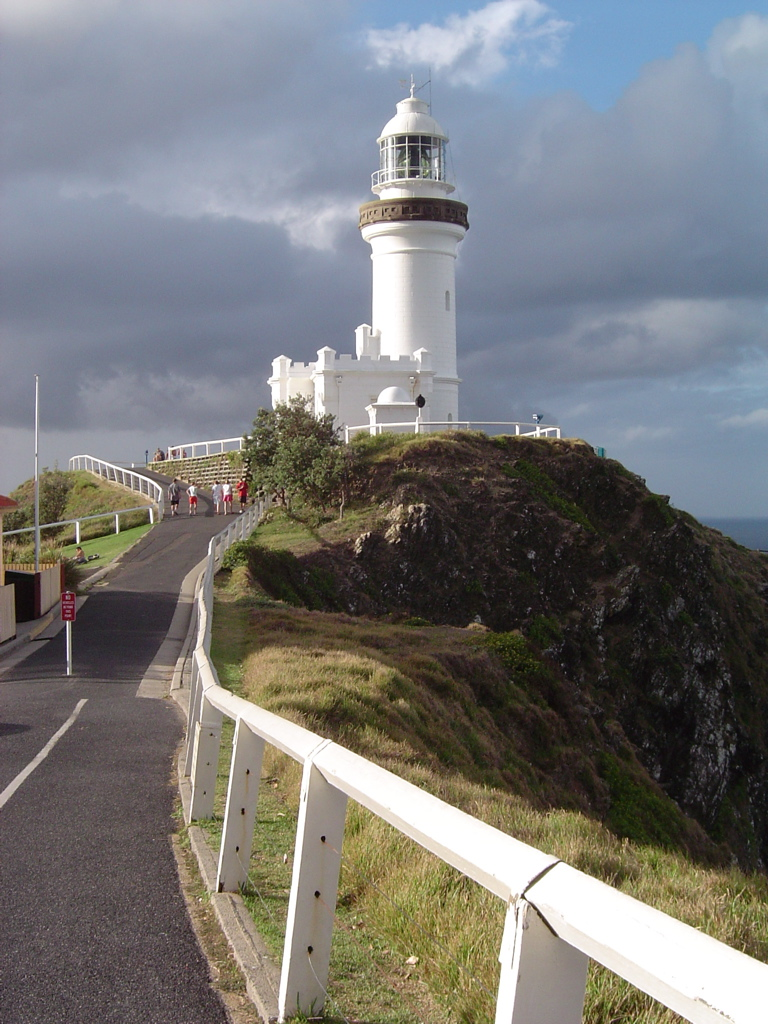
The road leading to Cape Byron Lighthouse

Across the globe, lighthouses have been constructed to safeguard shipping traffic, and the life and property they carry, from the dangers of the sea. Used as navigational aids, lighthouses serve to protect and guide mariners safely along treacherous coastlines and through harbor and river entrances. Although the colony's first lighthouse, the Macquarie Light at Sydney's South Head, was constructed in 1818, it was not until the mid 19th century that a considered uniform approach to lighthouse design was implemented across NSW.

As settlements were expanding and trade and coastal activity booming, the protection of life and property during its passage along the coast was becoming a critical issue for the colony. To address this, a powerful professional relationship was formed between Francis Hixson, Superintendent of Pilots, Lighthouses and Harbours and President of Marine Board of NSW (1863-1900), and James Barnet, Colonial Architect (1865–90), which shaped a cohesive "highway of lights" along the NSW coastline that demonstrated both architectural and functional consistency.

Responsible for the placement of navigational aids, Hixson was reported to have advocated for an ambitious system that would illuminate the coastline "like a street with lamps". The decision to proceed with building the light was made at the end of the 1890s, and the site was levelled in October 1899.

The design and construction of these lighthouses and stations, however, fell to the Colonial Architect's Office. Borrowing architectural themes established by Francis Greenway in his design of the Macquarie Light, Barnet designed a series of lightstations that provided architectural consistency while responding to the complexities and often physical isolation of each site. Made up of a central lighthouse tower flanked by Head Keepers Quarters and Assistant Keepers Quarters, each lightstation precinct also incorporated buildings and facilities for the operation and maintenance of the light as well as the permanent accommodation of the lightkeepers and their families.

In 1920, after the earlier completion of Hixson and Barnet's plan, Joshua Ramsbotham, then the Director of The Commonwealth Lighthouse Service, was said to have stated "the work done in NSW would compare favourably with anywhere in the world".

As Cape Byron was a significant headland with deep water at its base, it was considered to be easily visible to passing mariners and a lighthouse was not initially considered necessary. However, by the 1890s, as Cape Byron was the most northern location for a lighthouse in NSW, a station was promoted as being one of the last major structures to complete Hixson and Barnet's string of coastal navigation lights along the NSW coastline. Although Barnet had retired in 1890 and the Marine Board of NSW had been disbanded, the design of the Cape Byron Lighthouse would be the first of Barnet's successor Charles Assinder Harding, who also designed Norah Head Light and Point Perpendicular Light, in a style similar to Barnet's. Harding was a specialist lighthouse architect for the Harbour and River Navigation Branch of the Public Works Department and would bear some of the hallmarks of Barnett's earlier designs.

Under the direction of Cecil W. Darley, Engineer-in-Chief, and continuing the strong architectural styling of the existing Barnet lightstations, Harding designed a tower and precinct for the Cape Byron headland that was consistent with Hixson and Barnet's vision but distinctive and contemporary in its use of developing technology and construction techniques.

Taking advantage of the picturesque location and the prominence of the existing headland rising 100 metres (330 ft) above the Tasman Sea, Harding designed a relatively short circular tower (13.5 m to the base of the lantern) at the northern end of the precinct with entrance pavilion, workroom and kerosene store located symmetrically at its base. Following the traditional hierarchy of lightstations, the tower had a commanding view across the precinct which consisted of a Headkeeper's and Assistant Keeper's Quarters' of the Victorian Georgian style, as well as a signal station, store buildings and flagstaff.

In his design of the Cape Byron Lightstation, Harding employed a contemporary construction technique of using precast concrete blocks which he had trialed during the construction of the Point Perpendicular Light in 1898. Considered the prototype for NSW (although the first example was built at Point Hicks in Victoria in 1888), the use of the emerging concrete block technology at Point Perpendicular demonstrated a number of benefits for lighthouse construction as it eliminated previous dependencies on scaffolding, on-site quarrying or the need to transport quality stone and skilled tradesmen to the site. Concrete was a cheaper alternative as the blocks could be cast on-site and applied in a circular form with relative ease. With inherent strength and an aesthetic appearance, Harding considered the use of precast concrete blocks to be so successful that the design of the Cape Byron Lightstation is almost an identical copy of that constructed at Point Perpendicular.

Construction of the site began in July 1900 by contractors Mitchell and King. The total cost was A£10,042 pounds to the contractors, A£8,000 for the apparatus and lantern house, and A£2,600 for the road from Byron Bay township. Construction ended in 1901 and was to be celebrated on 30 November 1901 in a great banquet, with special trains carrying visitors from Lismore and Murwillumbah, at the presence of the Premier of the day, the Hon. John See, who was to arrive from Sydney in the government steamer 'Victoria'. However, bad weather delayed the ship till the following day and the banquet was held without him. The opening by the Premier took place a day later.

With a budget of A£18,000 allocated for the project in 1897, the narrow ridge of Cape Byron was cleared and levelled for the construction of the lighthouse, keepers cottages and associated structures in October 1899. Having cleared an access road to the site, a 40-strong workforce completed the lightstation precinct for its formal opening by the NSW Premier, John See on 1 December 1901. Having been fitted with a Henry-Lepaute feu eclair lightning flasher lens system on a mercury float mechanism with the light visible for 22 nautical miles (41 km; 25 mi), it was reported in newspapers of the time that there was not a finer station, nor one more picturesquely sited in NSW than the Cape Byron Lightstation.

The Cape Byron Lightstation was initially manned by a Head Keeper and two Assistant Keepers, who lived on the lightstation with their respective families, but after control of lighthouses in NSW was transferred to the Australian Government in 1915, lightstations were gradually but progressively automated and demanned. Cape Byron Lightstation was converted from vaporised kerosene to electricity in 1959 but, as a human presence was considered beneficial at the site, coupled with the proximity of the station to the Byron Bay township, light keepers continued to operate the station until 1989.

Although Cape Byron Lightstation continues to operate as a navigational aid, care and management of the site, its cultural heritage and its landscape was transferred to the Cape Byron Trust in 1989 and the site is carefully managed by a joint agreement between the Cape Byron Headland Reserve Trust, the National Parks & Wildlife Service, and the local Arakwal people.

The Cape Byron Lightstation is the most well known and highly visited lightstation in Australia. Standing on the most eastern point of Australia, the sweep of the light is visible from the Byron Bay township which evokes a sense of identity and "ownership" by the local community. The headland is also a significant tourist attraction in Australia due to the interaction of the natural and cultural factors and the image of the tower standing against a coastal environment.

As well as a historic value, the Cape Byron headland has a thriving future and contemporary significance. Developed in conjunction with the tourist appeal of the site, various educational initiatives are run to raise public awareness and appreciation for the Aboriginal culture of the cape. Named Walgun by the local Arakwal people (meaning The Shoulder), these initiatives aim to explore the traditional ownership of the headland by the Bundjalung people and how the Aboriginal cultural heritage values of the site are not confined to the past but are flourishing due to the joint care, control and custodianship of the reserve by the Arakwal people.

== Description ==
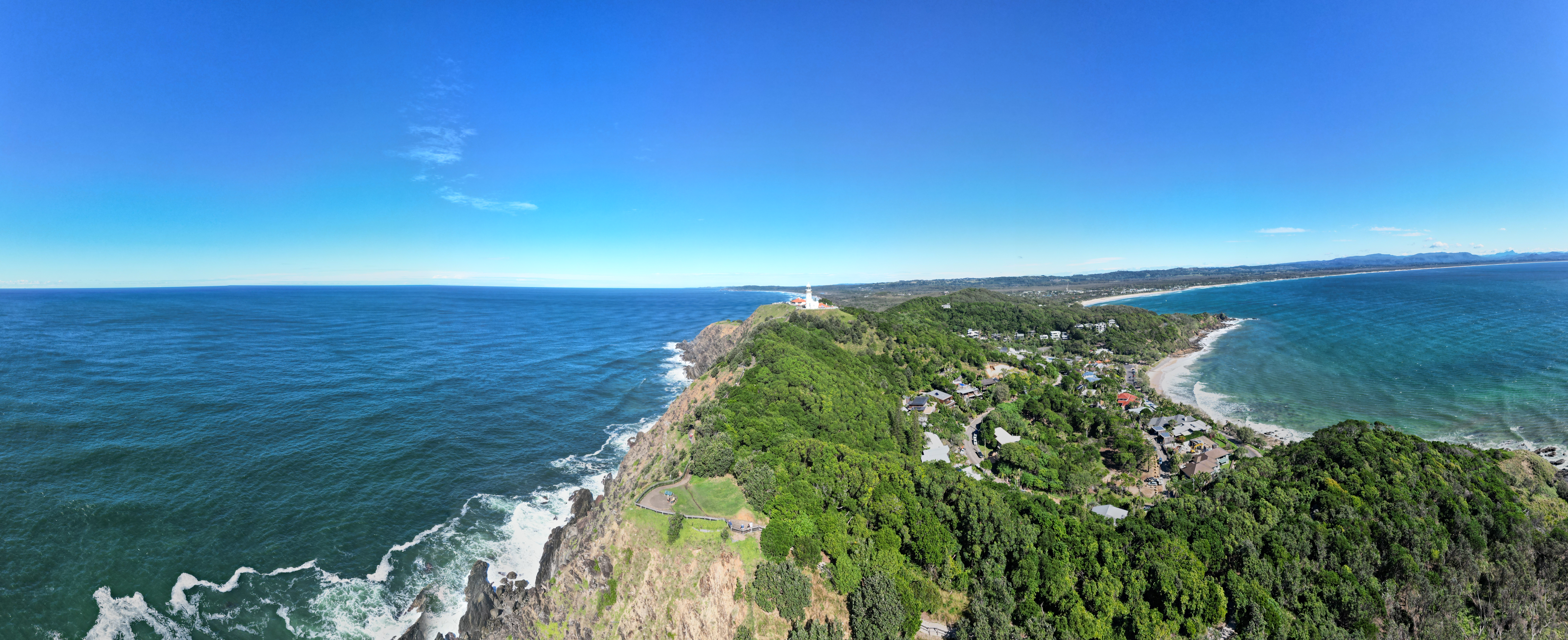
Wategos Bay and the Byron Bay Lighthouse

Spread across a long, narrow ridgeline on the most eastern point of Australia, the historic Cape Byron Lightstation precinct consists of a lighthouse tower with entry hall and flag store; Head Keeper's Quarters and Assistant Keeper's Quarters with storerooms, privies and rear yards; and a workshop/paint/store building. A contemporary cafe building and toilet structure has been constructed off the rear wall of the Head Keeper's Quarters storeroom.

The precinct is generally bound by a timber post and rail fence which closely follows the original fence alignment. Timber picket fences enclose the buildings and yards of the Head Keeper's Quarters and Assistant Keeper's Quarters. The site is generally lawned with hard paved areas for car parking and pedestrian pathways.

The Cape Byron Lighthouse is a circular tower, approximately 22m in height to the top of the lantern. Built of precast concrete blocks on a mass concrete foundation, the tower includes a concrete circular staircase with metal balustrade to its upper chambers and second floor. A metal staircase continues to the lantern room. The lighthouse includes a 13 inch Chance Bros & Co lantern on a Henry-Lepaute mercury float pedestal. The lighthouse has a concrete balcony with a trachyte balustrade.

The lighthouse contains a museum and the significant moveable heritage items including the 38-centimetre (15 in) Chance Bros & Co red sector light (1889) on a cast iron pedestal; the original curved timber desk (1899-1901) and the clockwork lantern winch (1901).

A flag store building adjoins the lighthouse tower with its timber pigeonholes intact.

The Head Keeper's Quarters, to the south of the lighthouse tower and orientated to the east, is a stand-alone single storey building constructed of rendered precast concrete blocks with a red tile roof in the Victorian Georgian style. The quarters contains five main rooms off a central hallway as well as a kitchen, laundry and bathroom, and a detached store and privy. A verandah, with infilled corners, extends around all sides of the dwelling.

The dwelling retains much of its original architraves and detailing (including rendered wall finishes, picture rails and doors). The original timber floors remain throughout the dwelling and the telephone (connecting the lighthouse and the dwelling) remains intact in the hallway. Although the original fireplace and chimneys remain, the tiling and hearth have been replaced. The kitchen, laundry and bathroom have been remodelled.

To the south of the Head Keeper's Quarters, and also orientated to the east, the two Assistant Keeper's Quarters include two separate but mirror-image dwellings under the one roof. Continuing the architectural style of the precinct, the Assistant Keeper's Quarters is a single storey Victorian Georgian building constructed of rendered precast concrete blocks with a red tile roof. Each dwelling contains four main rooms off a hallway as well as a kitchen, laundry and bathroom, and a detached store and privy. A verandah, with infilled corners, extends around all sides of the dwelling.

The dwellings retain much of the original architraves and detailing (including rendered wall finishes, picture rails and doors). The original timber floors remain, the corrugated ceiling remains in the main bedroom of one dwelling and the telephone (connecting the lighthouse and the dwelling) remains intact in both hallways. Although the original fireplace and chimneys remain, the tiling and hearth have been replaced. The kitchen, laundry and bathroom have been remodelled.

A stand-alone workshop/paint/store building is located between the lighthouse tower and the Head Keeper's Quarters. This is a single-room structure, constructed of precast concrete blocks with a red tile roof.

=== Lens, light source and power ===
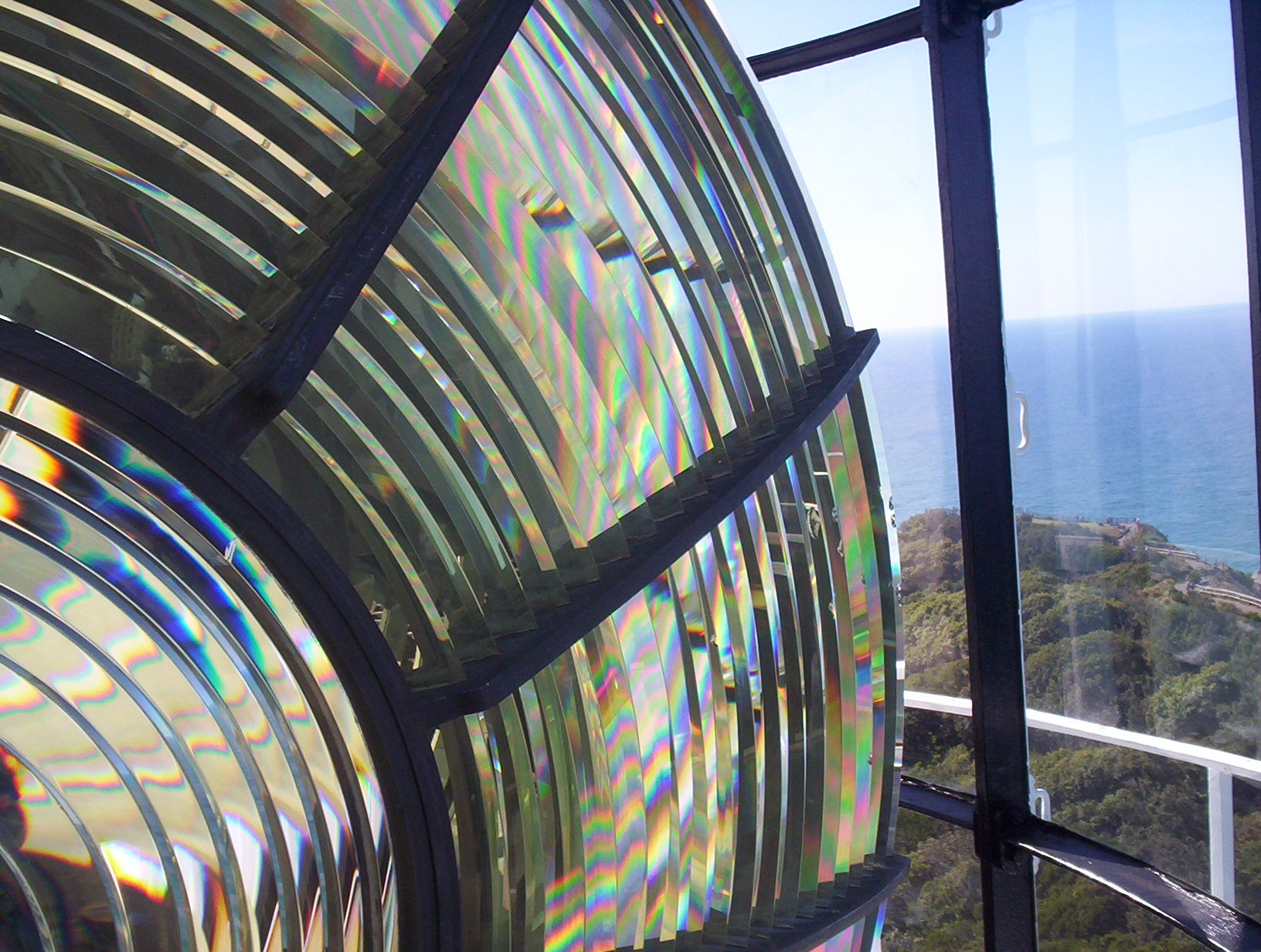
The lens at Cape Byron Light

The lens now in use is the original 1st-order bivalve Henry-LePaute Fresnel lens. The 2-metre (6 ft 7 in) diameter lens, weighing 8 tonnes (7.9 long tons; 8.8 short tons), contains 760 pieces of highly polished prismatic glass, floating in a 7 long hundredweight (356 kg; 784 lb) float bath of mercury. It was the first lighthouse in Australia with a mercury float mechanism. The mechanism is rotating also during the day to reduce the risk of fire from the sun's rays. It is the only Henry-LePaute apparatus in Australia.

The original light source was a concentric six wick kerosene burner with an intensity of 145,000 cd. This was replaced in 1922 by a vapourised kerosene mantle burner with an intensity of 500,000 cd.

In 1922 an improved apparatus was installed, doubling the power to 1,000,000 cd. In 1956 the light was electrified, the clock mechanism was replaced by an electric motor, and the light source was replaced with a 1000-watt 120-volt tungsten-halogen lamp with an intensity of 2,200,000 cd, fed from the Mains electricity, with a 2.5 KVA backup diesel alternator. At that time, the keeper staff was reduced from three to two.

The station was fully automated in 1989, and the last lighthouse keeper departed.

The light characteristic shown is a white flash every 15 seconds (Fl.W. 15s). The tower also displays a red, short ranged, continuous light (F.R.) to the northeast, covering Julian Rocks and the nearby reefs. The red light is emitted at a lower focal plain.

=== Structures ===
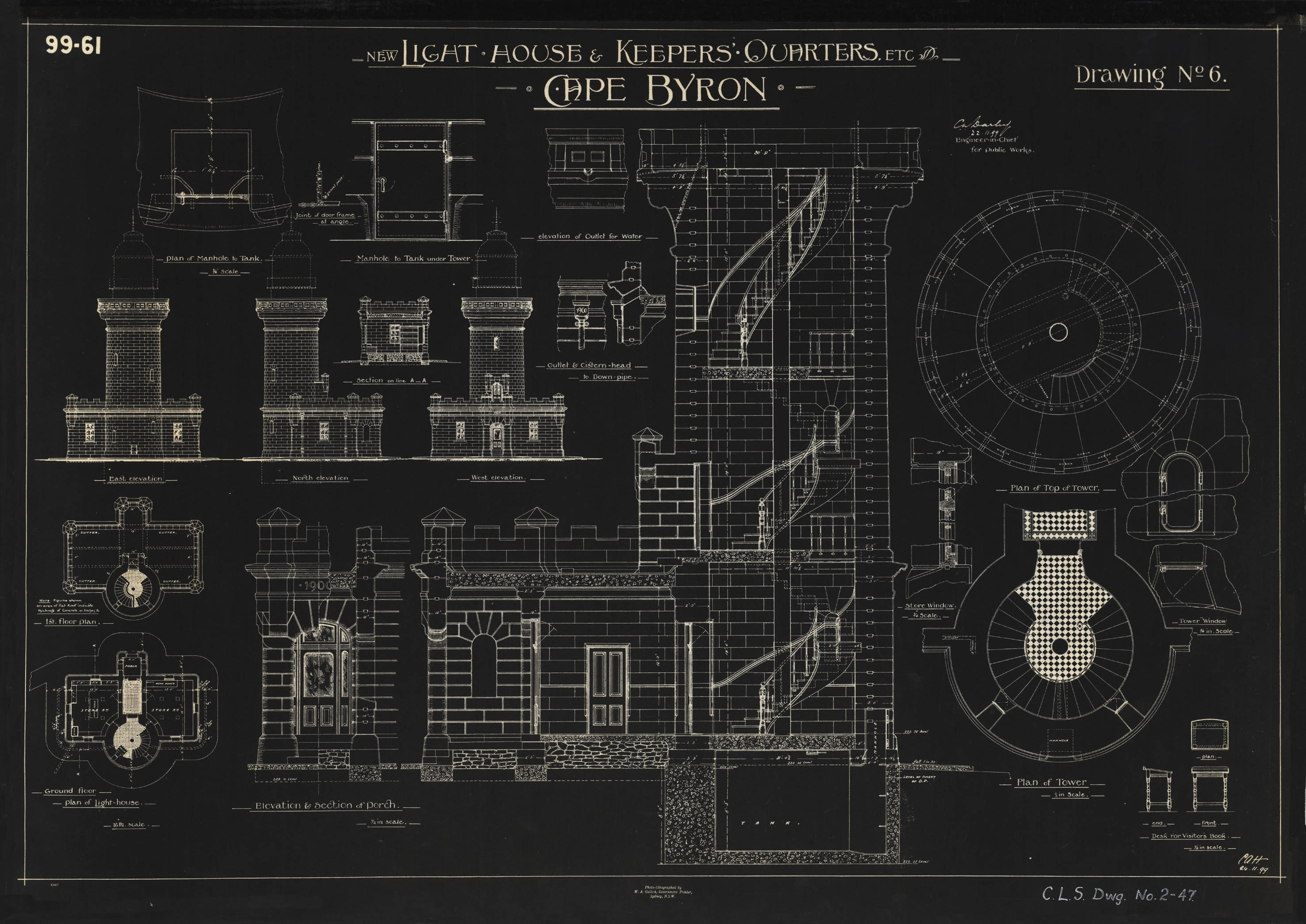
Detailed plans for the tower and annexe, 1899

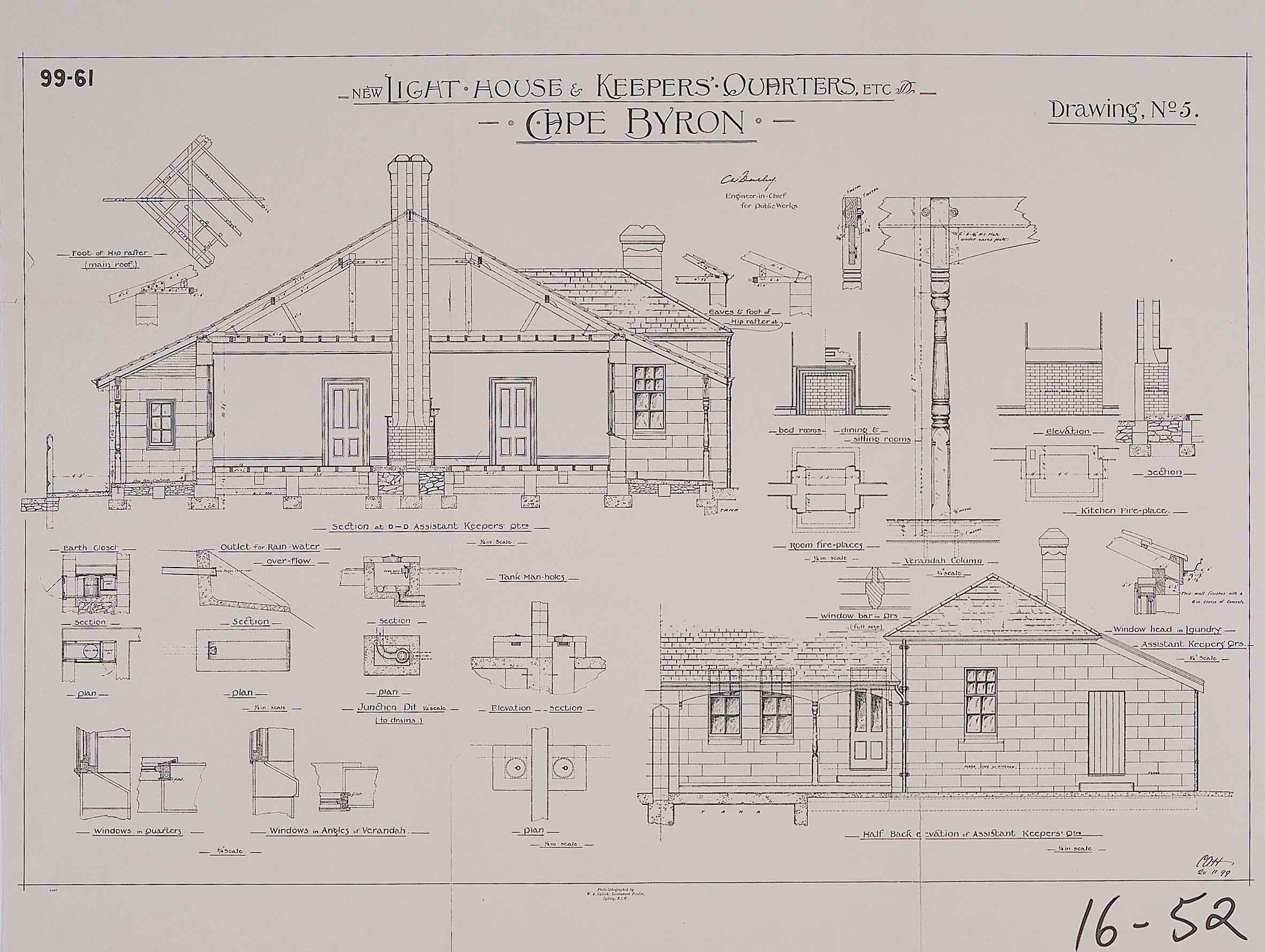
Plans for the keeper's quarters, 1899

The lighthouse is built out of precast concrete blocks and painted white. The concrete blocks were made on the ground, lifted and cemented into position and finally cement rendered inside and out. This technique saved the need for on-site quarrying. It was only the second lighthouse to be constructed in this method, the first being Point Perpendicular Light.

The tower is tapered, standing 74 feet (23 m) high, including the lantern. Ascending is done via an internal spiral concrete staircase with slate treads. It is topped by the iron floored lantern room. The lantern room has iron dado walls and the roof is domed, covered in sheet metal, and surmounted by a wind vane and a ventilator.

At the base of the tower, there is an entrance porch, lobby and two service rooms, all having crenellated parapet walls, painted white with blue trim on the bottom from the outside. The porch has a trachyte floor and steps, a cedar entrance door and etched glass panels and sidelights. The lobby has a tiled floor and trachyte steps, and the other rooms have asphalted floors and cedar windows.

Housing at the site includes the head lighthouse keeper's residence, and two assistant keeper's cottages (a duplex), which are available for overnight rental. Both structures were erected from precast concrete blocks in 1901.

Another distinctive structure is a small Flag Room, also constructed of precast concrete blocks. Also present are two garages, a workshop and public toilets. Some of the original fending is also extant.

=== Site operation ===
The light is operated by the Australian Maritime Safety Authority, while the site is managed by Department of Environment, Climate Change and Water as part of the Cape Byron State Conservation Area, and by the Byron Bay Headland Reserve Trust.

=== Condition ===
As at 15 June 2018, the Cape Byron Lightstation is in good condition due to regular maintenance undertaken by the joint managing bodies of the Cape Byron Headland Reserve in line with the adopted Conservation Management Plan and Plan of Management.

The integrity of the built structures of the Cape Byron Lightstation is high due to the intactness and authenticity of the fabric. Although some modifications were made to the Head Keeper's and Assistant Keeper's Quarters in the 1950s and 1960s, much of the original fabric has been reconstructed or reinstated where possible since management of the site was transferred to the Cape Byron Trust in 1989.

The integrity of the site is good, although modifications have occurred to the ancillary structures and broader landscape on the site to accommodate visitors and new site uses in more recent times. However, under the joint management of the site, any contemporary modifications are undertaken with a thorough understanding of the holistic cultural heritage significance of the Cape Byron Lightstation, the headland and the broader Cape Byron Headland Reserve.

=== Modifications and dates ===
Since the clearing of vegetation and Aboriginal cultural sites from the Cape Byron headland in 1899 for the construction of the lightstation, the site has undergone little modification other than operational upgrades, building maintenance and provision of visitor facilities to the site.

Modifications were undertaken at various times which served to modernise or enhance the operation and/or character of the light. The original mechanical occulting equipment was removed in July 1905 resulting in a change to the original characteristic of the light with one more favoured by mariners. The original six wick burner was replaced with a vaporised kerosene mantle in March 1914. The vaporised kerosene mantle was upgraded to a triple 55-millimetre (2 in) burner in 1922. The light was converted from kerosene to electricity in August 1959 and the keepers living on-site reduced to two. Changes were also made to living facilities (particularly kitchens, bathrooms and laundries). Although some of these changes cannot be rectified or recovered, much of the original fabric has been reconstructed or reinstated where possible since management of the site was transferred to the Cape Byron Trust in 1989 and the keepers removed.

Under the joint management of the site, any contemporary modifications are undertaken with a thorough understanding of the holistic cultural heritage significance of the Cape Byron Lightstation, the headland and the broader Cape Byron Headland Reserve.

== Visiting ==
The lighthouse is very well known, attracting more than 500,000 visitors per year. It is also a popular site for whale watching, with Southern Cross University's Whale Research Centre located at the lighthouse.

The lighthouse is located at the end of Lighthouse Road, east of Byron Bay. The site is open from sunrise to sunset, and paid parking is available at the site, and the tower is open to guided tours every day except Christmas Day, reservations are not required. The lighthouse can also be visited on foot from Byron Bay township via the Cape Byron Walking Track.

== Heritage listing ==
As at 23 August 2018, the Cape Byron Lightstation (including moveable items) is of state heritage significance as one of the last major lightstations that completed the "highway of lights" that has illuminated the NSW coastline since the 19th century. Among the final components of the string of lights that provided protection, navigational guidance and safe passage to the important colonial shipping industry, the Cape Byron Lightstation is a representative example of the system of lightstations that collectively reflect the logistical management and technical evolution of coastal infrastructure in NSW.

The design and layout of the Cape Byron Lightstation is architecturally consistent with the earlier stations but implemented technical advancements, such as precast concrete block construction and the Henry-Lepaute feu eclair lens system on a rotating mercury float mechanism, which were available at the turn of the 20th century. Today, these aspects of the Cape Byron Lightstation are considered to be rare in NSW.

The Cape Byron Lightstation includes three original moveable items which contribute to the significance of the site, including the 15 inch Chance Bros & Co red sector light (1889) on a cast iron pedestal; original curved timber desk (1899-1901); and clockwork winch used to drive the lens carriage (1901).

Located on the easternmost point of the Australian mainland, the Cape Byron Lightstation features a tower overlooking the Pacific Ocean. It functions as a public landmark and tourist destination, and is recognized as the most visited lightstation in Australia.

The Cape Byron headland is also of great traditional and contemporary significance to the Arakwal people. As custodians of their country, the Arakwal people hold an important and active role in the joint care and management of the reserve (which incorporates the lightstation) and undertake educational initiatives at the site to promote and raise awareness of the Aboriginal cultural heritage of the cape. Named Walgun (meaning 'The Shoulder'), today the Cape Byron headland is a place where both the traditional and contemporary cultural of the Arakwal people is practiced and celebrated.

Cape Byron Lightstation was listed on the New South Wales State Heritage Register on 22 February 2019 having satisfied the following criteria.

The place is important in demonstrating the course, or pattern, of cultural or natural history in New South Wales.

The Cape Byron headland is of state heritage significance for its occupation by the Bundjalung people of the Byron Bay area for many thousands of years prior to European settlement. The cape and its environment provided the local Aboriginal people with physical and spiritual resources which sustained both life and culture.

Constructed and lit by 1901, the Cape Byron Lightstation (including moveable items) is also of state heritage significance as one of the last major lightstations to complete the "highway of lights" along the NSW coastline. Coastal transport of produce, goods and passengers was an industry and critical colonial service during the mid-to-late 19th century and installing a comprehensive network of lightstations to illuminate the coastline and provide navigational guidance to the growing maritime industry. Ultimately successful, this string of coastal lights operated throughout the 20th century and the Cape Byron Lightstation, amongst the suite of stations, continues to guide and provide safe passage to maritime industries and traffic along the NSW coastline today.

The retention, display and interpretation of the significant moveable items within the lighthouse, including the 15 inch Chance Bro & Co red sector light (1889) on a cast iron pedestal; original curved timber desk (1899-1901); and clockwork winch used to drive the lens carriage (1901), contribute to the historical significance of the Cape Byron Lightstation.

The place has a strong or special association with a person, or group of persons, of importance of cultural or natural history of New South Wales's history.

The Cape Byron headland is of local heritage significance for its association with the Bundjalung people of Byron Bay. Traditionally known as Cavanba, the cape and its environment provided the local Aboriginal people with physical and spiritual resources which sustained both life and culture. Today, this association continues with the Arakwal people who have an important role in the joint management, care and control of the Cape Byron Headland Reserve.

The Cape Byron Lightstation is also of local heritage significance for its association with Charles Assinder Harding, specialist lighthouse architect for the Harbour and River Navigation Branch of the Public Works Department, and Cecil W. Darley, Engineer-in-Chief of the Public Works Department. As Colonial Architect James Barnet had retired and the Marine Board of NSW had been disbanded, Harding and Darley were responsible for the design and construction of the last lightstations that would complete the "highway of lights".

A significant, ambitious and ultimately successful project of Francis Hixson and Barnet in the mid-late 19th century, Harding designed the Cape Byron Lightstation with architectural styling that was consistent with Barnet's earlier stations but incorporating technological advancements of the period.

In the design and construction of the Cape Byron Lightstation, Harding and Darley made an important contribution to the completion of Hixson and Barnet's plan to illuminate the NSW coastline with lights and navigational aids.

The place is important in demonstrating aesthetic characteristics and/or a high degree of creative or technical achievement in New South Wales.

The Cape Byron Lighthouse (including moveable items) is of state heritage significance for its aesthetic and technical values.

Located within the Cape Byron Headland Reserve and sited prominently on the most eastern point of the Australian mainland, the Cape Byron Lighthouse is a relatively small but well-proportioned tower that reflects the consistent architectural design of the stations making up the "highway of lights" along the NSW coastline. Retaining its unique French manufactured Henry-Lepaute first order lantern, bi-valve two panel lens and rotating mercury float mechanism, the Cape Byron Lighthouse is flanked by a compact group of simple Victorian Georgian buildings (including Head Keeper's and Assistant Keeper's Quarters) that are visually complementary in alignment, scale, proportion and material.

Technically, the Cape Byron Lightstation is also of state heritage significance as it contains Australia's only Henry-Lepaute lantern and optic on a rotating mercury float mechanism. Considered leading optical technology at the turn of the 20th century, this optical system is still in operation as a navigational aid today and its retention is of great value to the significance of the Cape Byron Lightstation.

The place has a strong or special association with a particular community or cultural group in New South Wales for social, cultural or spiritual reasons.

The Cape Byron Lightstation (including moveable items) is of state heritage significance for its social values.

As well as a historic social value to the Bundjalung people of Byron Bay, the Cape Byron headland has a thriving contemporary social significance for the Arakwal people. With a formal and active role in the joint care and management of the Cape Byron Headland Reserve (which incorporates the lightstation), the Arakwal people continue their custodianship of country and cultural practice on the site. Although the construction of the lightstation destroyed traditionally sacred and cultural sites, today's Arakwal community run educative initiatives at the headland which raise public awareness and appreciation for the Aboriginal cultural heritage of the cape. Named Walgun by the local Arakwal people (meaning The Shoulder), these initiatives aim to explore the traditional ownership of the headland by the Bundjalung people and how the Aboriginal cultural heritage values of the site are not confined to the past but are flourishing due to the joint care, control and custodianship of the reserve by the Arakwal people.

The Cape Byron Lightstation is of state heritage significance for local, national and international visitors alike. The image of the tower's architecture juxtaposed with the dramatic coastal environment has had significant influence on the Lightstation's status as the most visited lightstation in Australia.

The place has potential to yield information that will contribute to an understanding of the cultural or natural history of New South Wales.

Within the Cape Byron Lightstation, there are opportunities to uncover further heritage values that may be of heritage significance. The Cape Byron headland, more broadly, has the ability to demonstrate the occupation of the area by the Bundjalung people of Byron Bay prior to European occupation. There is recorded evidence in the area of middens, camp sites and artefact scatters, a bora ring and possible burial sites and there is further scope to elaborate on archaeological investigations of Aboriginal cultural heritage values to reveal new information on how the Bundjalung people interacted with the landscape.

Elements associated with the design, construction, early operation and occupation of the site as a lightstation may be of heritage significance. Areas of substantial historical use which have undergone little to no disturbance (such as subfloor areas, privies and tips) may retain archaeological information.

The Cape Byron Lightstation includes the only example of a Henry-Lepaute feu eclair (lightning flasher) lens system on a rotating mercury float mechanism in Australia. Representing the best optical technology at the turn of the 19th century, the apparatus has technical value and could contribute to an understanding of the operation of lighthouses of the period.

The place possesses uncommon, rare or endangered aspects of the cultural or natural history of New South Wales.

The Cape Byron Lightstation (including moveable items) is of state heritage significance for its rarity values as it was only the second lightstation in NSW to be built of precast concrete blocks rather than the traditional stone material. Due to the success of the prototype at Point Perpendicular Lightstation in 1899 (although the first example was built at Point Hicks in Victoria in 1888) and the benefits and cost savings it made to lighthouse construction, the design of the Cape Byron Lightstation is almost an identical copy of that constructed at Point Perpendicular.

The Cape Byron Lightstation (including moveable items) is also of state heritage significance for the rarity of its optical system. Still in operation and use today, the Henry-Lepaute 2 sided (Bi-valve) lens system on a rotating mercury float mechanism was considered to be leading optical technology of the period and its retention is of great value to the significance of the Cape Byron Lightstation.

The place is important in demonstrating the principal characteristics of a class of cultural or natural places/environments in New South Wales.

The Cape Byron Lightstation (including moveable items) is of state heritage significance as a representative station along NSW's "highway of lights", a system of navigational aids installed along the coastline in the mid-to-late 19th century. Important to the safe passage of shipping in NSW, the system of lightstations has a collective significance that reflects the logistical management for installing coastal infrastructure and the technical evolution of the stations.

There is also an architectural coherency between lightstations across NSW, particularly those designed by James Barnet as the Colonial Architect (1865-1890). Cape Byron Lightstation was designed by Barnet's successor, Charles Assinder Harding, who continued the strong architectural styling of Barnet while designing a tower and precinct for the Cape Byron headland that was distinctive and contemporary in its use of developing technology and construction techniques.

As a representative example, the design and compact nature of the building group at Cape Byron reflects the typical layout of regional lightstation complexes around Australia.

== See also ==
- List of lighthouses in Australia
- List of lighthouse in New South Wales
