= Simon Hill (disambiguation) =

Simon Hill may refer to:

- Simon Hill (nutritionist), Australian nutritionist
- Simon Hill (born 1967) is an Australian-based sports commentator.
- Simon Hill (musician) (born 1969), British musician, songwriter and record producer
- Simon Hill (rugby union) (born 1968), Welsh international rugby player
- Simon Hill (priest) (born 1964), Archdeacon of Taunton
