= Cape Byron Rudolf Steiner School =

Private school in New South Wales, Australia

Location
- Byron Bay, New South Wales; Australia
- Coordinates: 28°39′19.44″S 153°34′3.52″E

Information
- Type: private
- Established: 1988
- Enrolment: ~295 (K–12)
- Website: www.capebyronsteiner.nsw.edu.au

Cape Byron Rudolf Steiner School is a private, co-educational, non-sectarian school providing education from grades K–12. Located approximately six kilometres west of Byron Bay in the suburb of Ewingsdale it has students from the Byron Shire and wider Northern Rivers region.
