= Byron Bay =

Town in New South Wales, Australia

Byron Bay Cavvanbah (Minjungbal)
- Town
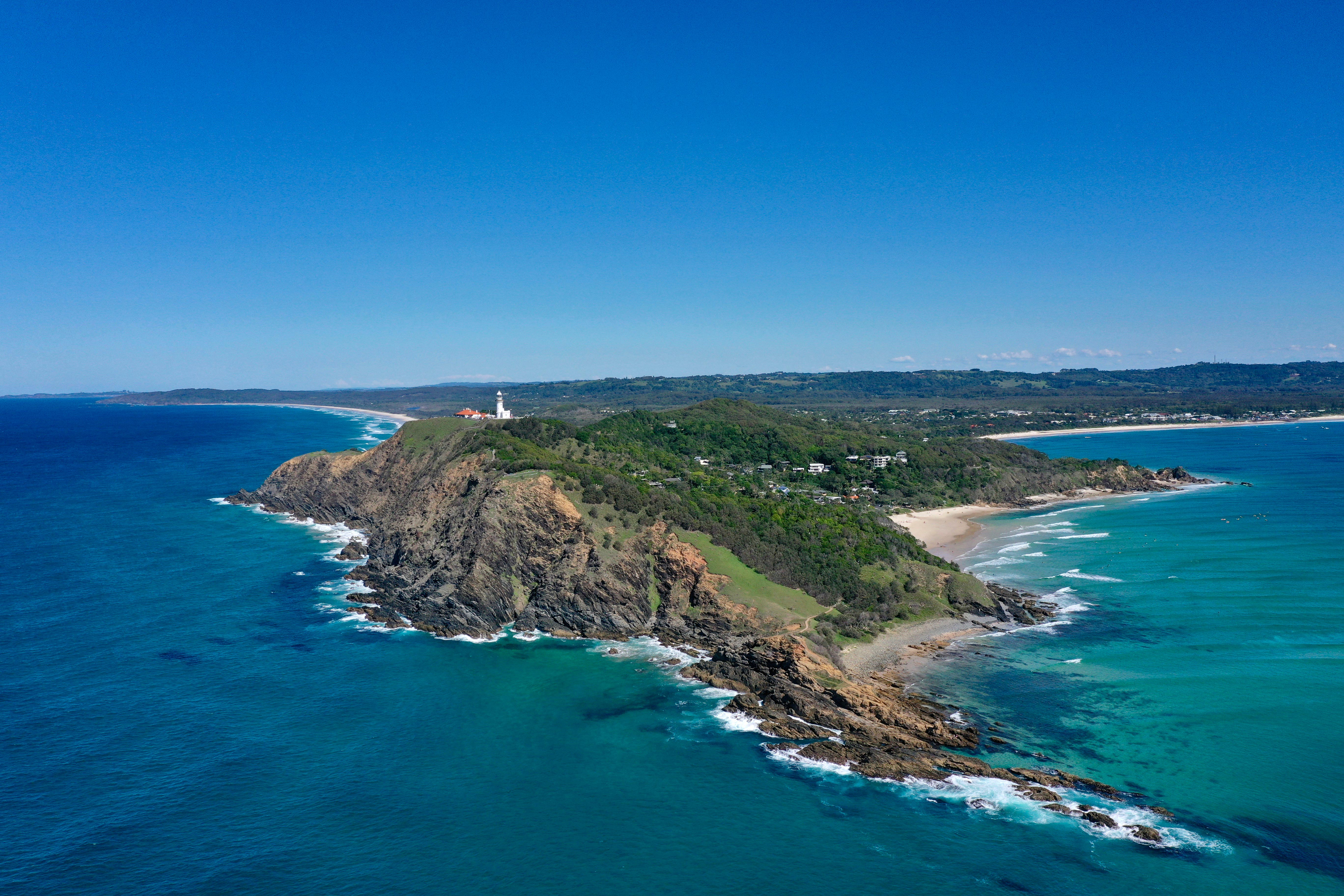
- Byron Bay, NSW (aerial shot showing Byron Bay's lighthouse, beaches and hinterland)

- Interactive map of Byron Bay
- Coordinates: 28°38′35″S 153°36′54″E
- Country: Australia
- State: New South Wales
- LGA: Byron Shire
- Location: 772 km (480 mi) from Sydney; 165 km (103 mi) from Brisbane; 34 km (21 mi) from Ballina; 46 km (29 mi) from Lismore; 66 km (41 mi) from Tweed Heads

Government
  - State electorate: Ballina
  - Federal division: Richmond
- Elevation: 3 m (9.8 ft)

Population
  - Total: 6,330 (2021 census)
- Postcode: 2481
- County: Rous
- Mean max temp: 23.5 °C (74.3 °F)
- Mean min temp: 16.9 °C (62.4 °F)
- Annual rainfall: 1,509.2 mm (59.42 in)

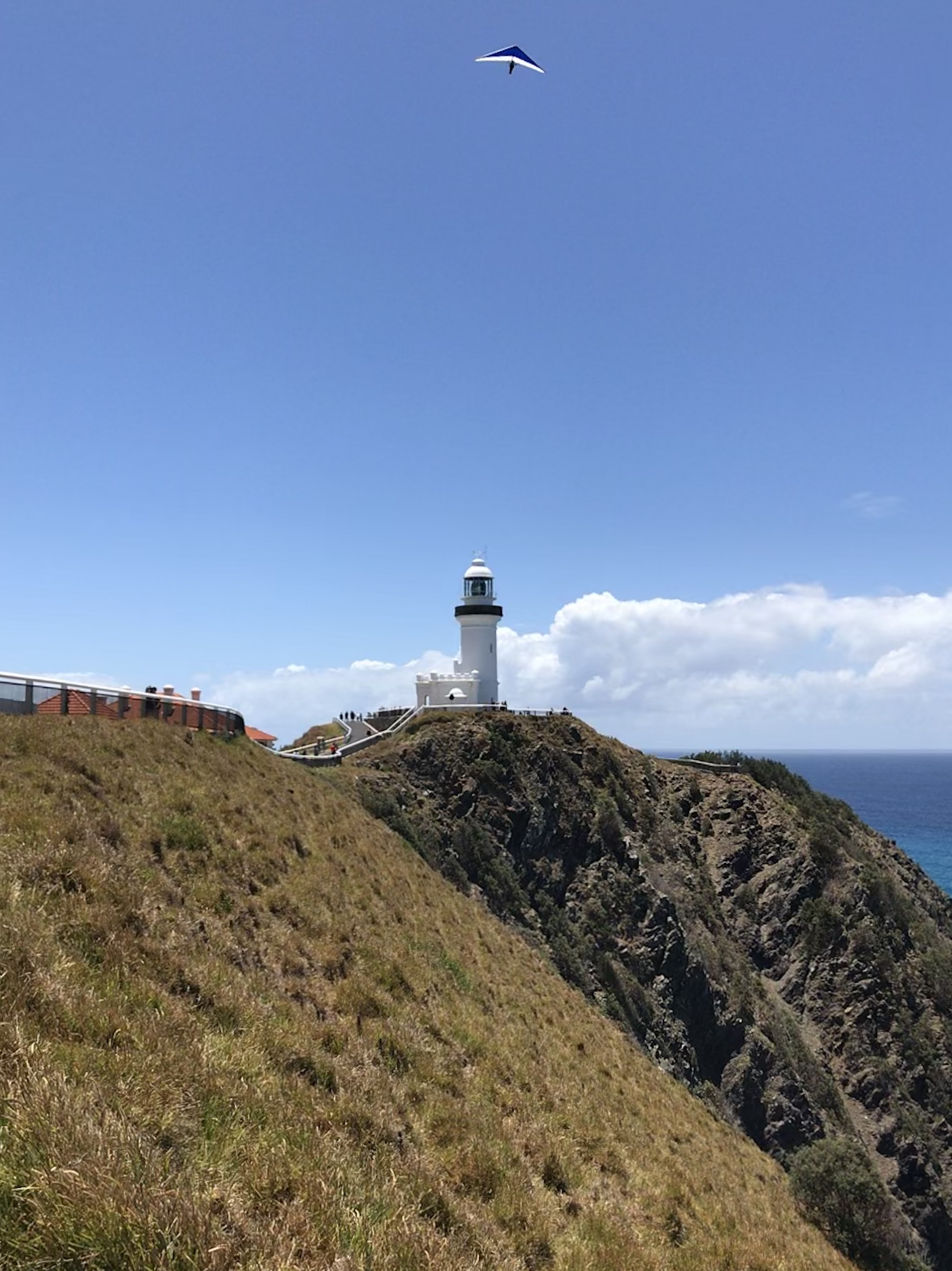
Cape Byron Lighthouse

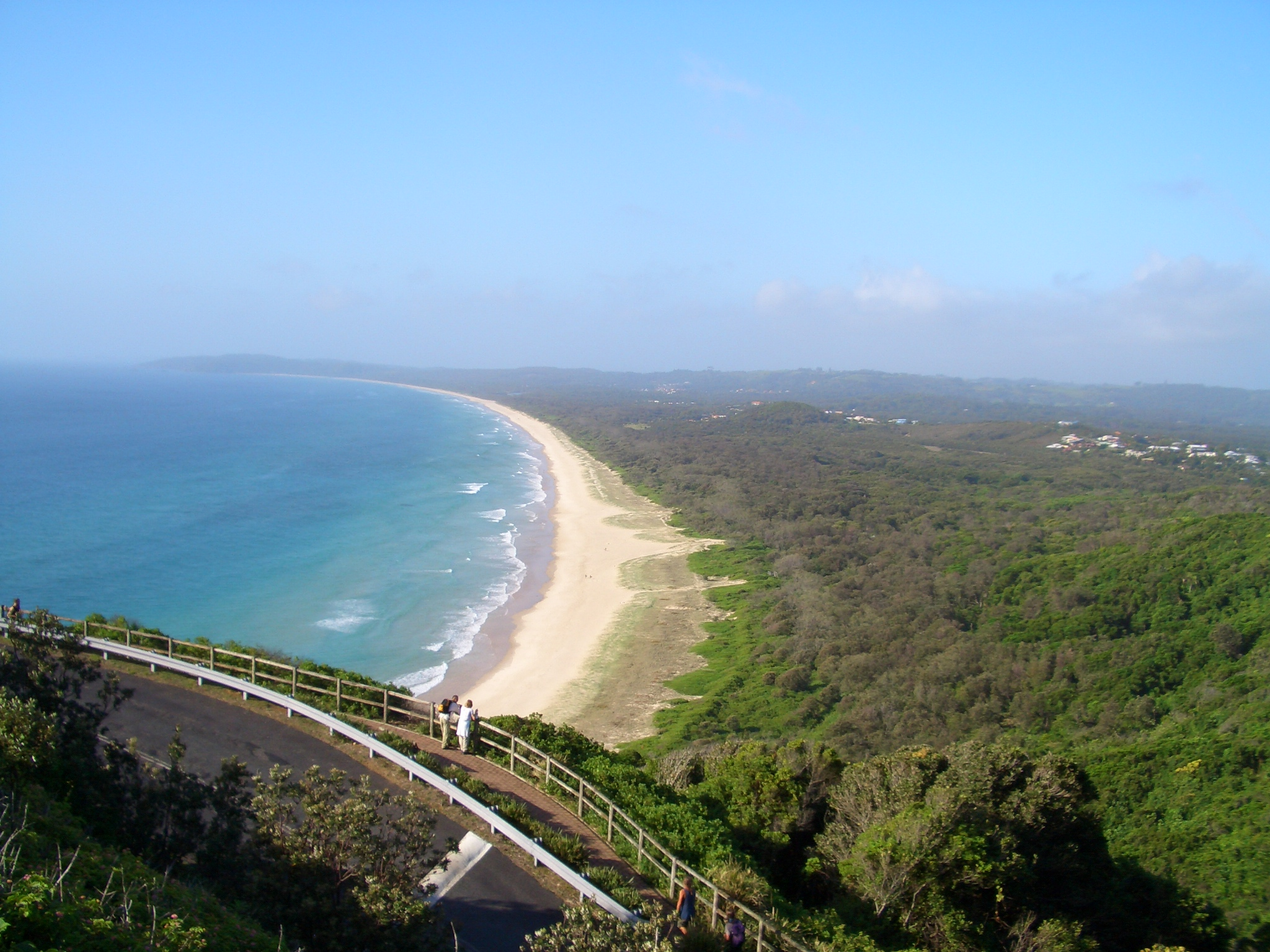
Looking south from the lighthouse along Tallow Beach

Wategos Beach with Julian Rocks out to sea

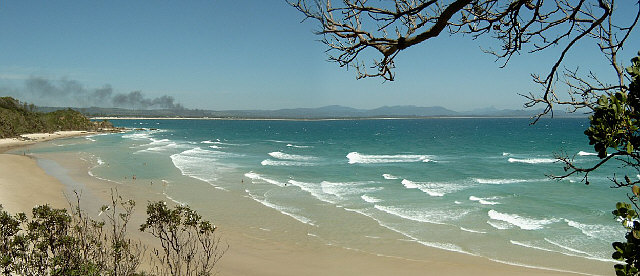
Byron Bay with sugar cane burning in the distance

Byron Bay (Minjungbal: Cavvanbah) is a beachside town located in the far-northeastern corner of New South Wales, Australia (in Bundjalung Country). It is located 772 kilometres (480 mi) north of Sydney and 165 kilometres (103 mi) south of Brisbane. Cape Byron, a headland adjacent to the town, is the easternmost point of mainland Australia. At the 2021 census, the town had a permanent population of 6,330. It is the largest town of Byron Shire local government area, though not the shire's administrative centre (which is Mullumbimby).

== History ==
Byron Bay and surrounds are located on traditional lands of the Bundjalung Nation of the Arakwal, Minjungbal and the Widjabul people who have lived by the coast for at least 22,000 years. Traditional custodians of the region believe that the land and people were created by Nguthungulli, who rests at what is now called Julian Rocks. The traditional name of the township area was Cavvanbah, meaning "meeting place". Significant totems for the area include Wajung and Kabul.

In 1770 Lieutenant James Cook found safe anchorage and named Cape Byron after a fellow sailor Vice Admiral 'Foul-Weather Jack' John Byron, circumnavigator of the world and grandfather of the poet Lord Byron. European settlement in the area took place in the 1830s. A massacre took place in the 1850s, south of Suffolk Park where the quarry is today.

The first industry in Byron was cedar logging from the Australian red cedar (Toona ciliata). The timber industry is the origin of the word "shoot" in many local names – Possum Shoot, Coopers Shoot and Skinners Shoot – where the timber-cutters would "shoot" the logs down the hills to be dragged to waiting ships. Timber getting became insignificant after World War I. As a result, many former timber workers became farmers.

Gold mining of the beaches was the next industry to occur. Gold was discovered in Byron Bay in 1870. Up to 20 mining leases set up on Tallow Beach to extract gold from the black sands around the 1870s.

Byron Bay has a history of primary industrial production (dairy factory, abattoirs, fishing, and whaling until 1963) and was a significant, but hazardous, sea port. The poet Brunton Stephens spoke of cattle grazing on the "mossy plains" of Cape Byron in a poem he penned in 1876.

The first jetty was built in 1886, and the railway was connected in 1894, and Cavvanbah became Byron Bay in 1894. Dairy farmers cleared more land and settled the area. In 1895, the Norco Co-operative was formed to provide cold storage and manage the dairy and processes meat industry. The introduction of paspalum grass improved production, and Byron Bay exported butter from its depots at Murwillumbah and Lismore to the world.

The Cape Byron Lighthouse was built in 1901 at the most easterly point on the Australian mainland. Its construction destroyed a significant Arakwal men's ceremonial ground.

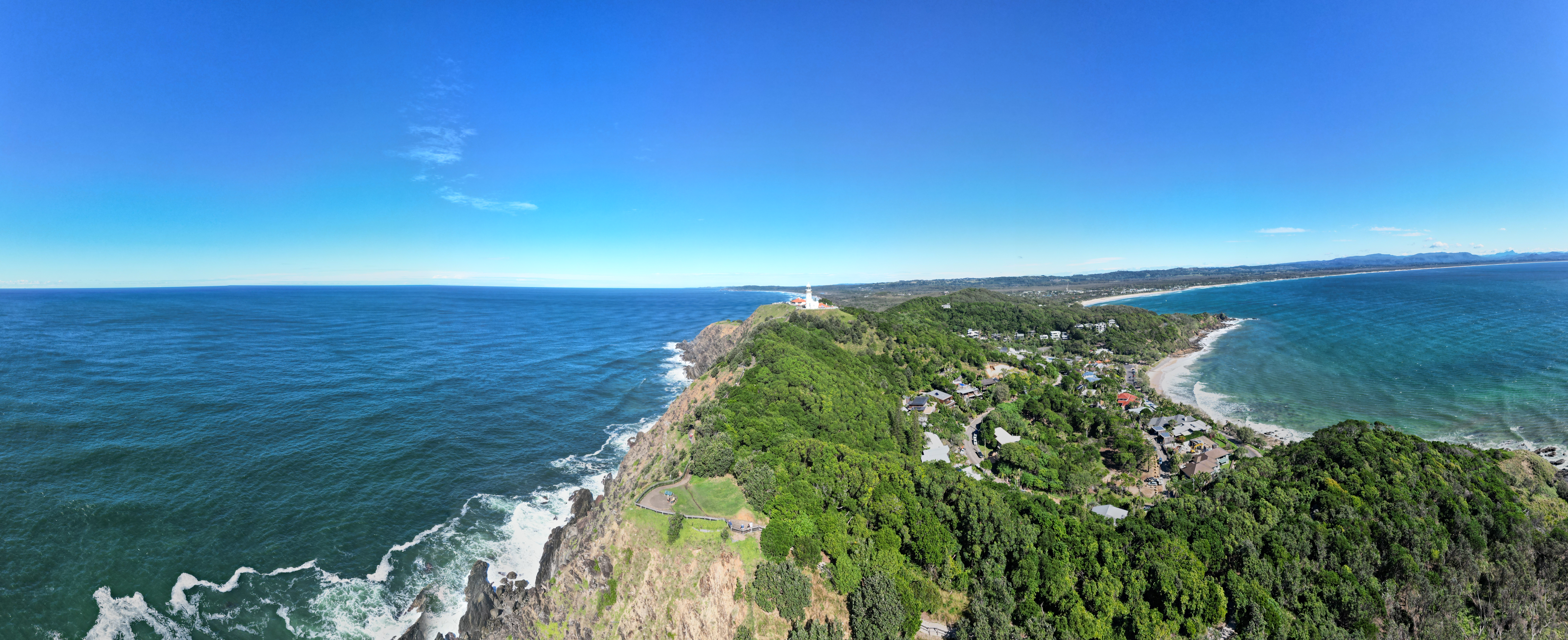
Wategos Bay and the Byron Bay Lighthouse

In 1930, the first meatworks opened. The smell from the meat and dairy works was appalling and the annual slaughter of migrating whales in the 1950s and 1960s made matters worse. Sand mining for monazite (zircon, uranium and thorium) between the World Wars damaged the environment further. Mining ceased in 1968 and processing in 1972.

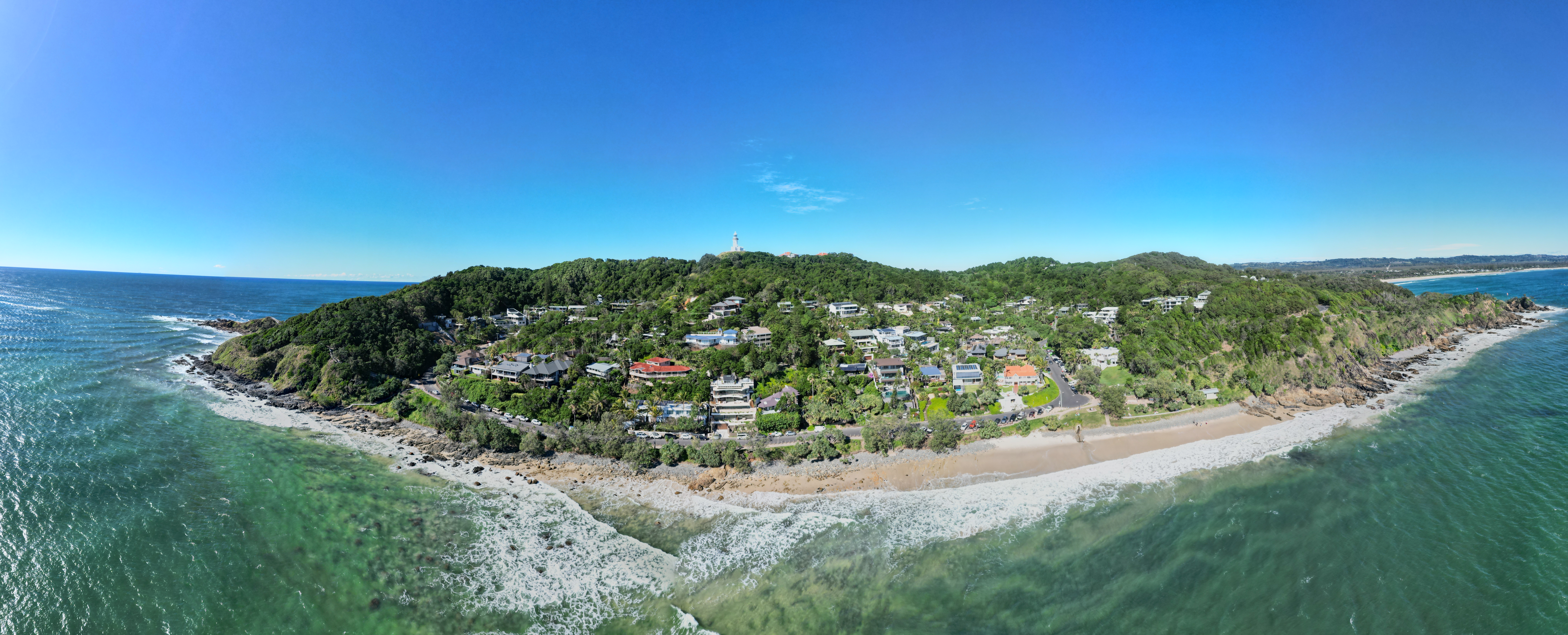
Wategos Beach panorama

Longboard surfers arrived in the 1960s and used natural breaks at The Pass, Wategos, and Cosy Corner. This was the beginning of Byron Bay as a travellers' destination, and by 1973, when the Aquarius Festival was held in nearby Nimbin, its reputation as a hippy, happy, alternative town was established, although tourism facilities remained minimal. From the 1980s, tourism began to develop in earnest, with the cash-poor surfers and hippies supplemented, and to a degree supplanted, by cash-rich conspicuous consumers who in turn stimulated the development of retail precincts and accommodation more tuned to their needs.

In 1994, a native title claim was made by Arakwal Elders Lorna Kelly, Linda Vidler and Yvonne Graham. After seven years of negotiation, an Indigenous Land Use Agreement was formed with the State of New South Wales in 2001, a national first and precedent for subsequent agreements around Australia. Two further local agreements also followed.

Today, Byron Bay is one of the most up-market residential areas on the Australian east coast with the growth in multi-million dollar mansions now pushing the median value of house sales up beyond AU$1.5 million in 2017, over a 100% increase since 2013, based on 2018 data from realestate.com.au. The average house price in 2024 was AU$3.6m, based on 57 sales. Byron Bay has one of the highest regional median house prices in Australia, at AU$2.87m as of May 2026. At the same time, the town has not lost its attraction to a diverse range of visitors including surfers, backpackers and general tourists interested in the natural attractions of the area, and also supports a healthy cross section of creative persons including artists, craftspersons and musicians, while its more recent hippy/new age past is reflected to a degree in a prevalence of alternative "new-age" shops, "spiritual" services such as meditation and yoga classes, and holistic healing/"wellness" retreats. As at 2018, the town is cited as having around 5,000 permanent residents, while being visited by 2 million tourists each year.

A number of shipwrecks litter the bay and surrounding areas. A total 16 are known with the most famous of these being the 'Wollongbar' which due to bad conditions sank off the eastern tip of Belongil beach, it now rests about 150 metres (490 ft) from the coast and is still visible above water during low tide.

== Heritage listings ==
Byron Bay has a number of heritage-listed sites, including:

- Casino–Murwillumbah railway: Byron Bay railway station
- 61 Jonson Street: Byron Bay Post Office
- Lighthouse Road: Cape Byron Lightstation

== Population ==
According to the 2021 census, there were 10,914 people in Byron Bay.

- Aboriginal and Torres Strait Islander people made up 1.8% of the population.
- 63.6% of people were born in Australia. The next most common countries of birth were England 5.6% and New Zealand 2.6%.
- 77.6% of people spoke only English at home.
- The most common response for religion was No Religion at 58.6%.

Historical population
Year	Pop.	±%
1954	2,001	—
1961	2,172	+8.5%
1966	2,315	+6.6%
1971	2,323	+0.3%
1976	2,525	+8.7%
1981	3,187	+26.2%
1986	3,730	+17.0%
1991	5,001	+34.1%
1996	6,130	+22.6%
2001	5,919	−3.4%
2006	4,981	−15.8%
2011	4,959	−0.4%
2016	5,521	+11.3%
2021	6,330	+14.7%
Source: Australian Bureau of Statistics data. Note: data from 2016 counts Byron Bay as a State Suburb, not as an Urban Locality, and does not include the population of neighbouring community Suffolk Park.

== Geology and geography ==
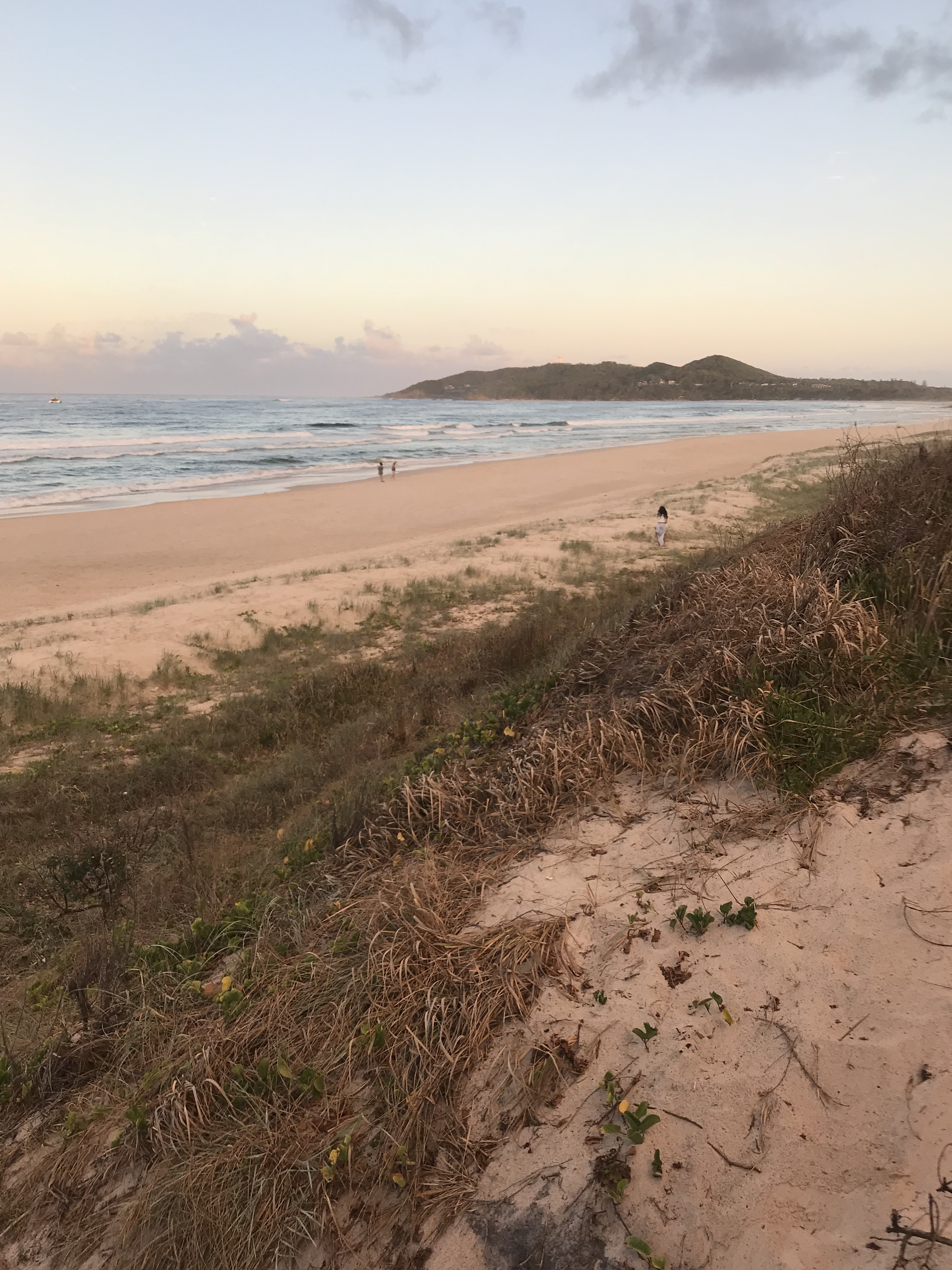
Belongil Beach

Byron Bay is part of the erosion caldera of an ancient shield volcano, the Tweed Volcano, which had erupted 23 million years ago. The volcano formed as a result of the Indo-Australian Plate moving over the East Australia hotspot. Although was named a Bay when discovered, it is in fact in geological terms a "Bight" as the angle of curvature from Cape Byron to Hastings point is less than 25 degrees.

=== Climate ===
Byron Bay has a humid subtropical climate (Cfa in the Köppen climate classification) with warm summers and mild winters. Winters have daily maximums usually reaching 19.4 °C and a minimum of 12 °C. Summer can be hot, with a daily average of 27 °C. Summer evenings can be wet, cooling the day down. Due to its location on an ocean-facing cape, it is, therefore, more exposed to moist easterly flows, hence its annual rainfall above 1,500 mm, which is higher than that of Brisbane and the Gold Coast.

Climate data for Byron Bay (Cape Byron AWS, 2002–present)
Month	Jan	Feb	Mar	Apr	May	Jun	Jul	Aug	Sep	Oct	Nov	Dec	Year
Record high °C (°F)	34.0 (93.2)	34.0 (93.2)	32.8 (91.0)	29.8 (85.6)	26.9 (80.4)	25.0 (77.0)	27.1 (80.8)	28.3 (82.9)	32.0 (89.6)	35.9 (96.6)	33.3 (91.9)	34.8 (94.6)	35.9 (96.6)
Mean daily maximum °C (°F)	28.0 (82.4)	27.5 (81.5)	26.6 (79.9)	24.0 (75.2)	21.5 (70.7)	19.4 (66.9)	18.9 (66.0)	20.1 (68.2)	22.1 (71.8)	23.6 (74.5)	25.3 (77.5)	26.7 (80.1)	23.6 (74.5)
Mean daily minimum °C (°F)	21.3 (70.3)	21.2 (70.2)	20.2 (68.4)	17.6 (63.7)	15.1 (59.2)	13.2 (55.8)	12.3 (54.1)	13.1 (55.6)	15.3 (59.5)	16.9 (62.4)	18.6 (65.5)	20.0 (68.0)	17.1 (62.8)
Record low °C (°F)	16.5 (61.7)	16.0 (60.8)	14.7 (58.5)	10.9 (51.6)	9.0 (48.2)	6.5 (43.7)	7.1 (44.8)	6.6 (43.9)	9.7 (49.5)	9.5 (49.1)	11.8 (53.2)	13.9 (57.0)	6.5 (43.7)
Average rainfall mm (inches)	164.4 (6.47)	166.6 (6.56)	142.1 (5.59)	183.5 (7.22)	99.4 (3.91)	164.9 (6.49)	96.3 (3.79)	75.4 (2.97)	47.0 (1.85)	95.8 (3.77)	93.4 (3.68)	139.3 (5.48)	1,509.2 (59.42)
Average precipitation days	15.4	15.3	16.4	15.5	13.8	14.0	12.3	8.2	9.0	12.7	11.5	14.1	158.2
Source: Bureau of Meteorology

Byron Bay Water Temperature
Month	Jan	Feb	Mar	Apr	May	Jun	Jul	Aug	Sep	Oct	Nov	Dec	Year
Average sea temperature °C (°F)	27.1 (79.9)	28.1 (81.8)	27.8 (80.8)	26.5 (78.8)	25.7 (77.0)	24.1 (74.2)	22.8 (72.1)	22.6 (71.8)	22.9 (72.4)	25.2 (75.3)	26.0 (77.5)	22.9 (79.0)	24.1 (74.2)
Source: Metoc (sea temperature)

== Tourism ==
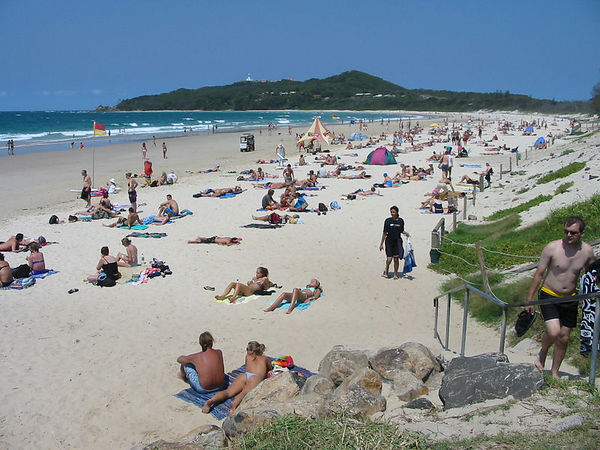
The main beach with Cape Byron in the distance, in 2006

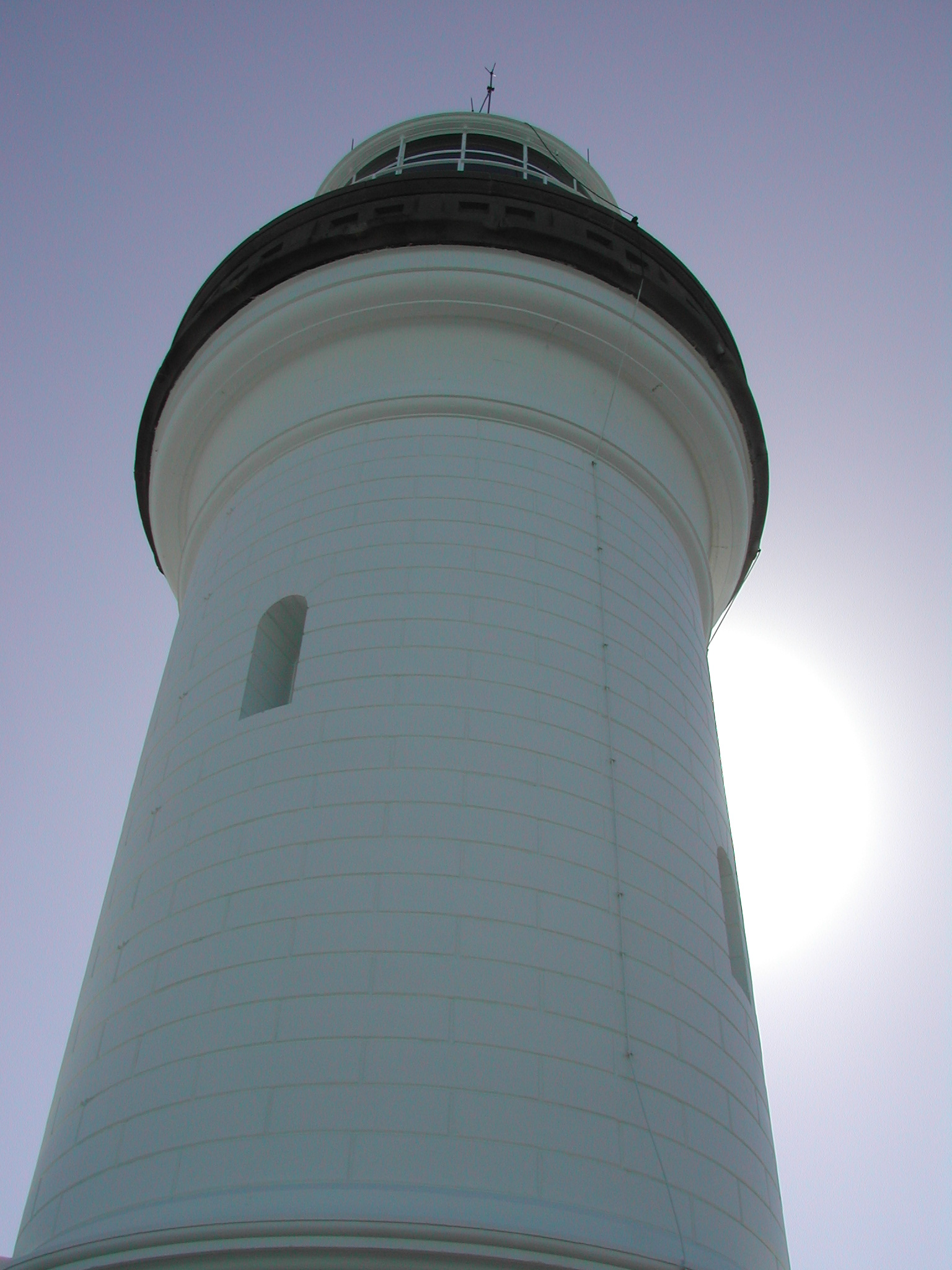
Cape Byron Lighthouse

The town is a resort popular with both domestic and international tourists, not the least backpackers. It has several beaches that are popular for surfing and the scenery attracts skydivers. An oceanway allows visitors to walk and cycle from the centre of town to Cape Byron Lighthouse.

The area is noted for its wildlife, with whale watching a significant contributor to the local economy. Temperate and tropical waters merge here, making it a popular place for scuba diving and snorkelling. Most diving is done at Julian Rocks, 2.5 kilometres from the town and part of the Cape Byron Marine Park. Subtropical rainforests are nearby, and areas such as the Nightcap National Park and its Minyon Falls are within easy reach of the town.

Byron Bay is a popular destination for Schoolies week during late November and early December.

== Events ==
Festivals held in or near Byron Bay include the Byron Bay Bluesfest at Tyagarah at Easter, Falls Festival NYE and Splendour in the Grass, the Byron Bay International Fashion Festival on 29 April each year, the Byron Bay Writers Festival, the Byron Bay Film Festival, Byron Bay Surf Festival, Byron Spirit Festival and the Byron Underwater Festival. The Byron Bay Triathlon is held on the second Saturday in May every year; 1,300 competitors from many countries enter this Olympic Distance event. The musical community has produced bands such as Blue King Brown, Parkway Drive and 50 Lions.

== Markets ==
Byron Bay has a number of regular markets including a weekly farmers' market at the Butler Street Reserve every Thursday morning with over 70 local farmers selling fresh produce. There is also a Byron Community Market held on the same site on the first Sunday of each month and the Artisan Market held on Saturday evenings at Railway Park from October to Easter. There are three annual specialist Beachside Markets held in January, Easter and September.

== Transport ==
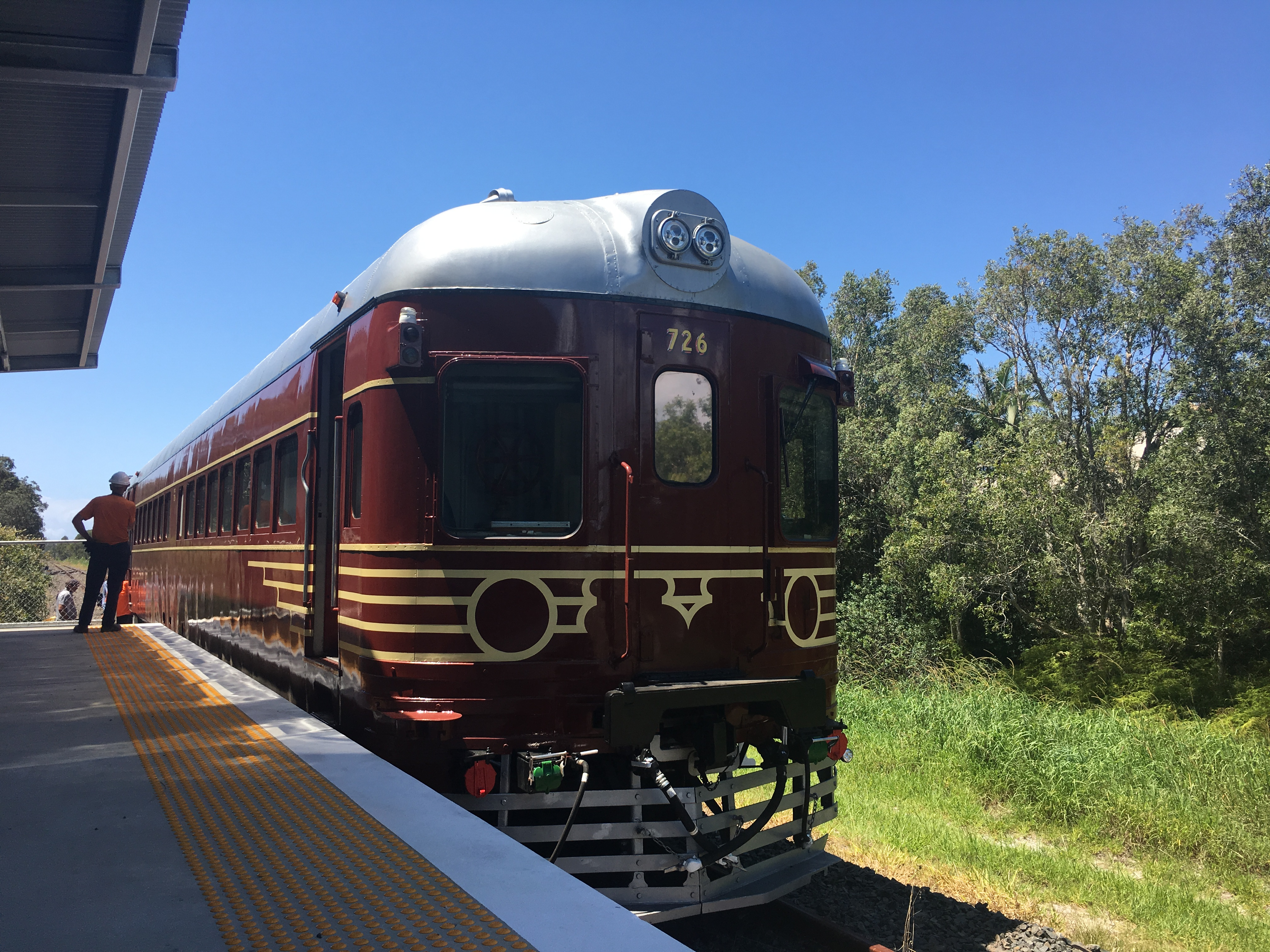
The Byron Bay solar-powered-train service utilises a converted 1940s-built trainset

A bus interchange is located west of the old railway station along Butler Street and is served by Greyhound Australia, NSW TrainLink and Premier Motor Services coach services from Sydney and Brisbane.

Air travel is served by Ballina Byron Gateway Airport, which is located 35 km (22 mi) south of Byron Bay. The airport provides daily direct domestic flights to Sydney and Melbourne. Other nearby airports to Byron Bay are Gold Coast Airport, located 66 km (41 mi) north and Brisbane Airport, which is located 173 km (107 mi) north of the town centre.

The privately run Byron Bay Train operates a shuttle service on a rehabilitated 3 kilometres (1.9 mi) section of the disused Murwillimbah line between Byron Bay station in the Byron township and North Beach station, adjacent to the Elements of Byron resort. The service opened in December 2017, and uses an ex-NSWGR railmotor, converted to run exclusively on solar power using panels on top of the train and at the stations.

Until 2004, Byron Bay railway station was a stop on the Casino to Murwillumbah railway line. It was served by trains from Sydney and, for various periods, also by services originating at Casino that connected with expresses running between Sydney and South Brisbane.

== Education ==
Byron Bay schools include Byron Bay Public School, Byron Bay High School, St Finbarr's Primary School, Byron Bay Community School, and Cape Byron Rudolf Steiner School. Among these are a number of early childhood facilities including Byron Bay Preschool and Periwinkle Preschool. In the fields of adult education, there are international education providers Lexis English Centres and Lexis Training (previously Global Village English Centres), the Byron Region Community College, which is a registered training organisation and the SAE Institute Byron Bay which is an institution in the fields of audio engineering, digital film making, multimedia and animation.

== Sport and recreation ==
The Byron Bay Surf Club is the longest-standing current sports club; it has been one of Australia's leading surf clubs and has been in continuous operation for more than 105 years. The rugby league club the Byron Bay Red Devils and the Australian rules football team Byron Magpies are well known.

Byron Bay FC has won 14 top grade honours in Football Far North Coast competitions including 4 ANZAC Cups (2003, 2004, 2007 and 2017), 5 premierships (2006, 2014, 2015, 2017 and 2019) and 5 Cyril Mayo Cups for winning the grand final (2005, 2006, 2013, 2017 and 2018). Byron Bay was created as a junior club in 1963 and formed their first senior team in 1966. In 1982, Byron Bay joined Lismore & District Soccer Association competitions. In 2017, Byron Bay became one of only 5 clubs to win the treble (ANZAC Cup, premiership and Cyril Mayo Cup) in the same season, and became the first, and so far only club to win the treble and Summer Youth League (which began in 2008).

Other clubs include Byron Bay Golf Club, Byron Bay Cricket Club, Byron Bay Rugby Union Club, Byron Bay Gliding Club, Byron Bay Hang Gliding / Paragliding Club and the Byron Bay Bowling Club.

The Byron Bay Ocean Swim Classic is held every year.

== Local media ==
The Byron Bay area has a number of newspapers:

- The Byron Shire Echo (Independent weekly A3)
- The Byron Shire News (APN weekly A3)
- The Saturday Star (Independent A5 monthly)
- The Bagg (Independent weekly A3 gig guide)
- The Northern Star (APN daily, produced in nearby Lismore)

The community radio station Bay FM broadcasts on 99.9 FM from within Byron Bay itself. Other local stations in the Byron area are:

- 2LM 900 AM (commercial)
- 100.9 ZZZ FM (commercial)
- ABC North Coast 94.5 FM
- River-FM 92.9 FM (community)

All major television channels are available in Byron Bay and the wider Northern Rivers region:

- Seven (formerly Prime7), 7HD, 7two, 7mate, 7flix, 7Bravo, ishop tv (Seven Network owned and operated station channels, commercial)
- Nine (NBN), 9HD, 9Go!, 9Gem, 9Life, Extra (Nine Network owned and operated station channels, commercial)
- 10 Northern NSW (formerly Southern Cross 10), 10 HD, 10 Drama, 10 Comedy, Nickelodeon and News24 Regional (Network 10 owned and operated station channels, commercial)
- ABC TV, ABC HD, ABC Family, ABC Kids, ABC Entertains and ABC News (Australian Broadcasting Corporation, public)
- SBS, SBS HD, SBS2, SBS World Movies, NITV, SBS Food and SBS WorldWatch (Special Broadcasting Service, public)

== Notable people ==
Notable people from or who have lived in Byron Bay include:

- Parkway Drive – Metalcore Band
- Daevid Allen – musician
- Simon Baker – actor
- Renee Bargh – TV presenter
- Jordan Barrett – fashion model
- John Cornell – businessman and Delvene Delaney, actress and co-host of Sale of the Century
- Shelley Craft – television presenter
- Eka Darville – actor
- Joe Daniher – Australian rules footballer
- Zac Efron – actor
- Chris Hemsworth – actor
- Simon Hill – nutritionist
- Pauline Menczer – professional surfer, 1993 Women's World Champion
- Olivia Newton-John – singer, songwriter, actress, novelist
- Kerry O'Brien – journalist
- Parcels – band, formed at Cape Byron Rudolf Steiner School, now based in Berlin
- Garret Parkes – surfer
- Elsa Pataky – actress
- Mouche Phillips – actress
- Ric Richardson – inventor
- Space Cowboy – a record-breaking "sword swallower" and street performer who hails from Byron Bay
- Taylor Steele – filmmaker
- Mel Symons – television presenter
- Andrew Thompson – racing driver
- Beau Walker – professional surfer and television presenter
- Cleopatra Coleman – actress and model, appeared in The Last Man on Earth and In the Shadow of the Moon
- Dinesh Palipana OAM – doctor, legal professional and disability advocate
- Marty Mayberry – para-alpine skier, competed at the 2006 and 2010 Winter Paralympics
- Nathan Baggaley – sprint canoeist and surfskier, competed at the 2004 Summer Olympics
- Jake Duncombe – professional skateboarder
- Pete Murray – singer-songwriter

== In popular culture ==
John Macgregor's 1986 novel Propinquity is partly set in Byron Bay and nearby Mullumbimby. The 2008/2009 ABC drama series East of Everything, written by Deb Cox and Roger Monk, is set in the fictional town of Broken Bay which is based on a somewhat more run-down version of Byron Bay and its surrounds, with much of the filming taking place in and around Byron Bay including obviously recognisable landmarks such as the lighthouse and local beaches. Parts of the 2014 film The Inbetweeners 2 take place in Byron Bay. The town also features in the 2016 open world racing video game, Forza Horizon 3 and is where the Horizon Byron Bay Festival is situated. In July 2019 Byron Bay was used in Neighbours for the return storyline for Dee Bliss.

The driver's license of Zak in Fern Gully (1992) indicates that he resides in Byron Bay, suggesting that the plot of the movie occurs in Australia.
