= Byron Bay Post Office =

- Location within New South Wales
- 28.6442°S 153.6128°E
- Location: 61 Jonson Street, Byron Bay, New South Wales, Australia

Commonwealth Heritage List
- Official name: Byron Bay Post Office
- Type: Listed place (Historic)
- Designated: 22 August 2012
- Reference no.: 106175

Byron Bay Post Office is a heritage-listed post office at 61 Jonson Street, Byron Bay, New South Wales, Australia. It was added to the Australian Commonwealth Heritage List on 22 August 2012.

== History ==
Post office status was officially granted to Byron Bay in March 1888, while prior to this date Byron Bay was graded as a receiving office. In 1889 post and telegraph services, previously separate, were amalgamated. The railway from Lismore arrived in 1894, and provided a link between the river and sea ports to the expanding dairy industry. The region also prospered following the establishment of the Norco Butter Factory in the early twentieth century.

The current (original component of) Byron Bay Post and Telegraph Office was constructed in 1896 at a cost of £464 by local builders, Susannah Atkins, W John Hocquard and A F Wallis; after extensive delay it was opened in March 1897. A telephone exchange was opened in 1909 and Postmaster General Office records show that the building underwent considerable alteration in 1916, when a central gabled extension to the front and north wing were added. Extensive rear additions were constructed around 1997 to accommodate postal functions and the original building component at the front was leased for commercial use.

The original building was designed by New South Wales Government Architect's Office (probably George Oakeshott) under Walter Vernon and later reworked by the Commonwealth Department of Works and Railways.

== Description ==
Byron Bay Post Office is at 61 Jonson Street, Byron Bay, comprising the whole of Lot 1 DP736784.

The Byron Bay Post Office is located on a large, essentially rectangular site located at the centre of Byron Bay's civic and administrative centre. The site originally extended from Jonson Street at the front through to Fletcher Street at the rear, however the construction of a telephone exchange at the rear of the site, and its eventual subdivision from the post office, terminated any relationship with Fletcher Street. While much of the townscape is modern commercial development, the post office has a visual link with the neighbouring former Institute building to the south and low scale retail shops to the north; the town's historic railway station and more recent visitor information centre is located directly opposite. The site comprises the 1896–1916 former post office building with landscaped setting occupying the western half, with the majority of the eastern half occupied by the 1997 post office building. Rear access to a narrow side yard space is provided by a lane from the north.

The existing 1896–1916 frontal component features a single storey volume, essentially symmetrical in conception. Constructed on a cruciform plan the timber-framed weatherboard-clad structure is surmounted by a hipped corrugated Colorbond steel roof with frontal gable over the projecting central bay (the latter was added in 1916). The gable contains a louvred vent and the roofline is punctuated by original rendered brick chimneys with corbelled caps. The street elevation contains a tripartite window to the projecting bay with matching paired entrance doors in the south and north elevations of the bay, indicating the postal hall. The south bay is now blind to the street with an original tripartite window and non-original paired door in the south elevation. The north bay has been extended in a northerly direction into the original verandah area but retains an original panelled timber door and single window. The later construction is indicated by different weatherboard profile. The whole of the 1916 construction is screened by a timber-framed skillion verandah with exposed rafters, arched beams, square posts and non-original timber balustrade. The original south verandah has been extended in an easterly direction by two bays to meet the 1997 post office wing behind, and a disabled access ramp has been constructed along the southern side. The original timber verandah floor has been overlaid with an asphalted membrane with stamped mock brick pattern.

The façade of the original building displays recent café signage although the notice boards adjacent to the main entrance may be earlier. The original north elevation has been altered by the infill of the original verandah, though the verandah structure remains visible. The large rear additions are evidenced by the alternative weatherboard profile and face brick construction to the rear elevations. The roof span is much greater than the original, resulting in a higher hipped volume finished with Colorbond corrugated steel.

In plan form, the former post office section has been substantially altered by the removal of most internal partition walls and the construction of the rear addition in 1997, removing all evidence of the former residential component. The original layout of the frontal component is only broadly discernable due to the remnant sections of wall and bulkheads.

The key elements of the Byron Bay Post Office are its:

- prominent frontal component
- Federation characteristics
- historic verandahed presentation to the street

=== Condition ===
Typologically, the original building combined a post and telegraph office and residence, altered to accommodate a telephone exchange in 1909 and enlarged and reworked in 1916. This was substantially altered and enlarged in 1997, relocating all postal functions from the original building and providing a separate retail tenancy area within the original post office. As such, the original building has been dramatically altered in plan form, fabric and presentation twice, although the 1916 alterations were significant in their own right. Internally, little or no evidence remains of the post office function and refurbishment work including suspended ceilings, wall linings and vinyl flooring has concealed original fabric and finishes.

Architecturally and aesthetically, the exterior of the front (Jonson Street) component still presents a 1916 post office idiom, although this gradually degenerates towards the rear of the building and the extensive additions. The level of decorative detail has also been diminished with the replacement of original signage, roof sheeting and verandah fretwork and flooring.

Externally and internally, the building appears to be in relatively sound condition, well maintained and with no major defects visible. The roof and subfloor spaces were not inspected and the installation of internal linings conceals the original structure and finishes.

=== Original fabric ===
- Structural frame: Timber-framed floor, walls and roof on brick piers
- External walls: Chamfered profile, weatherboard cladding
- Internal walls: Timber-framed and lined with lath and plaster or beaded timber lining boards [unknown]; 1919 alterations possibly relined the original with plaster sheet
- Floor: Timber boarded with moulded timber skirting boards
- Ceiling: Unknown, possibly beaded timber lining or lathe and plaster; 1919 alterations possibly relined the original with plaster sheet.
- Roof: Hipped corrugated galvanised iron with gablet over main entrance, ogee profile gutters, cast iron roof decoration [?], rendered brick chimneys with moulded caps. Bull-nosed corrugated galvanised iron verandah roof with cast iron posts and frieze with pediment gable and finial over central entrance.
- Other: Timber picket fence to frontage; timber-framed double-hung sash windows; panelled timber doors

=== Subsequent modifications ===
- 1909: Telephone exchange opened.
- 1916–22: Substantial reworking of building to incorporate projecting gabled bay to front and hipped side wing to the north of the original; entrances provided from north and south verandah to new postal hall bay; replacement of original bull-nosed verandahs with straight timber verandahs with arched beams and fretwork balustrade; removal of front section of picket fence; internal refurbishment; construction of linesmen's shed; new letter boxes installed.
- 1945: New lavatory block constructed, concrete paths, sundry repairs and repainting. Possibly involved the infill of the 1916 north wing verandah bay.

== Heritage listing ==
Historically, Byron Bay Post Office, constructed in 1896 and enlarged in 1916, is significant for its demonstrated associations with the development of the township, including in the aftermath of the arrival of the railway from Lismore in 1894. The latter provided a link between the river and sea ports to the expanding dairy industry of the hinterland. While the post office originally combined a postal hall and telegraph office with a postmaster's residence in a domestically scaled and constructed "villa" form, this was later altered to include a telephone exchange. Other extensive alterations in 1916 reworked and enlarged the building to incorporate a larger public area, related to an increase in population closely tied to the growth of the town on the basis of the success of the Norco Butter Factory. The building is also significant for its position as part of the railway precinct group, in the cultural and administrative centre of the town (criterion a).

Stylistically, Byron Bay Post Office is an amalgam of the late-Victorian villa idiom and a reworked Federation era homestead design with minor Queen Anne overtones. Federation themes are expressed through the building's scale, multiple roof form and timber expression, although much of the post office's characteristic period detail has been removed. The gabled and verandahed frontage remains a strong design component (criterion d).

Aesthetically, Byron Bay Post Office is also prominently located within, and contributes to, the group of modest low-scale civic buildings and landscape elements in the town known as the so-called Railway Precinct group. The Federation period themes which remain evident and distinctive, as expressed through the building's scale, gabled roof form and timbered verandah, support this contribution. The post office is also one of several buildings in the town promoted on a tourism website, again emphasising its degree of local prominence (criterion e).

The curtilage includes the title block/allotment of the property.

The significant components of Byron Bay Post Office include the main 1896-1916 former postal building (the front component) with landscaped setting occupying the western half; the built form on the majority of the eastern half of the building, occupied by the 1997 post office, is not significant. The separate telephone exchange to the east of the site, facing Fletcher Street, is not recommended for inclusion in the CHL.

Byron Bay Post Office was listed on the Australian Commonwealth Heritage List on 22 August 2012 having satisfied the following criteria.

Criterion A: Processes

Constructed in 1896 and enlarged in 1916, Byron Bay Post Office is of historical significance for its demonstrated associations with the development of the township, including in the aftermath of the arrival of the railway from Lismore in 1894. The latter provided a link between the river and sea ports to the expanding dairy industry of the hinterland. While the post office originally combined a postal hall and telegraph office with a postmaster's residence in a domestically scaled and constructed "villa" form, this was later altered to include a telephone exchange. Other extensive alterations in 1916 reworked and enlarged the building to incorporate a larger public area, related to an increase in population closely tied to the growth of the town on the basis of the success of the Norco Butter Factory. The building is also significant for its position as part of the railway precinct group, in the cultural and administrative centre of the town.

Criterion D: Characteristic values

Byron Bay Post Office is an example of a:

1. Post office and telegraph office with quarters (second generation typology 1870–1929).

2. Building in the Federation-era domestic homestead style with minor Queen Anne overtones.

3. Building by New South Wales Government Architect's Office reworked by the Commonwealth Department of Works and Railways.

Typologically, Byron Bay was designed as a combined post and telegraph office with a residence at the rear. Alterations in 1916 generally enlarged the postal component and introduced a clearly distinct frontal element to what previously appeared to be a completely amalgamated and integrated design. The visually distinct post office component was standard in small post office design of the later Federation period. While this aspect has been broadly retained externally, the key planning elements associated with the type, particularly the relationship between the main postal hall, the residence and telegraph function, has been substantially diminished particularly given the use of the original building as a café and the relocation of all postal function to a new building at the rear. In plan form, the former post office section has also been substantially altered by the removal of most internal partition walls and the construction of the rear addition in 1997, removing all evidence of the former residential component.

Stylistically, Byron Bay Post Office is an amalgam of the late-Victorian villa idiom and a reworked Federation era homestead design with minor Queen Anne overtones. Federation themes are expressed through the building's scale, multiple roof form and timber expression. Acknowledging this, much of Byron Bay's characteristic period detail has been removed or altered, particularly internally, where the building has been completely gutted and refurbished, although the gabled and verandahed frontage remains a strong design component. Architecturally, as it presents today, Byron Bay is an adaptation of a commonly applied Commonwealth style to a small regional institutional building.

Criterion E: Aesthetic characteristics

Byron Bay Post Office is prominently located within the group of modest low-scale civic buildings and landscape elements of the so-called Railway Precinct group, which form the cultural, administrative and geographical centre of the town. Although alteration has occurred to the building, Federation period themes remain evident and distinctive, as expressed through the building's scale, gabled roof form and timbered verandah. The post office is also one of several buildings in the town promoted on a tourism website, again emphasising its degree of local prominence.

== Bibliography ==
=== References ===
- GS Warmington and AC Ward et al., Australia Post Survey of Historic Properties in New South Wales, Volume 3, 1990
- Tim Shellshear, Byron Shire Environmental Study Working Paper No 6 – Heritage, 1983
- Conybeare Morrison and Partners, Byron Bay Main Street Study, 1992
- Byron Shire Community-based Heritage Committee, Byron Shire Community-based Heritage Study – Draft, 2005
- Savills, APPD Property Valuation Report, June 2005; 'Images of the Streets of Byron', at www.byronbay.com.

=== Photographic images ===
- c.1907, 1914, c.1919, 1932, 1949, c.1983, 1991, 1992, plus others undated (1919–1950)

=== Architectural drawings ===
- Original: 1896 plans not located but apparently held in the National Archives of Australia (Series number SP32/1, Barcode 6871804)
- Alterations: 1916–22 plans not located but apparently held in the National Archives (1918–24, Series number SP1107/1, Barcode number 942357 and 1922, Series number SP155/1, Barcode number 1686506)
- Existing conditions: Supply Chains Solutions - NSW, 'Byron Bay Post Shop Area Plan', dated September 2002 (1997 additions only)

=== National Archive records ===
- Plans of Byron Bay Post Office, Series Number SP1107/1, Barcode 942357
- Byron Bay Post Office history file, Series Number C3629, Barcode 1543008
- Byron Bay Post Office specifications, Series Number SP155/1, Barcodes 1686506, 1686507 & 1686545
- Byron Bay Post Office file, Series Number SP32/1, Barcodes 315483, 315487, 6871804, 6871832, 6871833, 6871834, 6871835 & 6871836
- Byron Bay Post Office repairs, Series Number MP33/1, Barcodes 6000695, 6000748 & 6000760
