= Garret Parkes =

Australian surfer

Garrett Parkes
Personal information
- Born: 22 July 1991 (age 34) Byron Bay, Australia
- Height: 5 ft 8 in (173 cm)
- Weight: 142 lb (64 kg)

Surfing career
- Sport: Surfing
- Sponsors: DHD

Surfing specifications
- Stance: Natural (Regular)

Garret Parkes (born 22 July 1991) is a professional surfer from Byron Bay, Australia.

The Association of Surfing Professionals, ASP, gave Garrett a Qualification Series, QS, ranking of 31st in the world in 2014. He had seven QS Heat wins in 2014. He is currently sponsored by the DHD surfing team.
