= Nguthungulli Julian Rocks Nature Reserve =

Protected area in New South Wales, Australia

- IUCN category Ia (strict nature reserve)
- Location within New South Wales
- Location: New South Wales
- Nearest city: Byron Bay
- Coordinates: 28°36′41″S 153°37.′44″E
- Area: 40.47 km^{2} (15.63 sq mi)
- Established: March 1961
- Governing body: NSW National Parks and Wildlife Service
- Website: Official website

The Nguthungulli Julian Rocks Nature Reserve is a protected nature reserve that is located on the Julian Rocks in the Northern Rivers region of New South Wales, in Australia.

The 4,047-hectare (10,000-acre) reserve comprise two small islands, situated in the Tasman Sea of the South Pacific Ocean, approximately 2.5 kilometres (1.6 mi) northeast of Byron Bay.

== Features ==
According to Indigenous lore from the Bundjalung people, a jealous husband threw his spear at the canoe of his wife and her lover. The canoe broke in two and sank to the bottom of the ocean. Only the back and the front of the boat stuck out of the water.

The islands were sighted by Captain James Cook when he passed through the area in 1770. However, he did not name them. The rocks are referred to as the Juan and Julia Rocks in Staff Commander Howard’s 1883 survey report of Cape Byron Bay and in his sketch of Byron Bay. These names are a reference to the protagonists of Lord Byron poem Don Juan.

In 1982, after pressure from locals, the area surrounding the rocks was established as a marine reserve, with all fishing and commercial exploitation banned for a 500 metres (1,600 ft) range around the rocks. The area is home to large numbers of marine species, including leopard sharks, grey nurse sharks, wobbegong, a variety of nudibranchs. It's one of about a dozen critical habitats for the grey nurse shark in NSW. Scuba divers identify the site as one of the top sites in Australia for its wide variety of marine life.

From May to September, humpback whales are commonly spotted traveling between the rocks and the mainland and are a common sighting on the short boat trip between the mainland and the rocks. The Cape Byron Marine Park, declared in 2002, surrounds the reserve. A sanctuary zone within the marine park was declared in 2006.

In July 2023, it was announced that the landmark would officially be renamed Nguthungulli in order to improve Indigenous representation. This name is the Bundjalung language word used the refer to the 'Father of the World' and, in the same language, these rocks have also been referred to as Sulaoma Billigin for which no translation is available.

== See also ==
- Protected areas of New South Wales
