= Simon Hill (nutritionist) =

Australian nutritionist

- Occupations: Author, nutritionist

Simon Hill is an Australian nutritionist, physiotherapist and podcaster known for his advocacy of plant-rich dietary patterns.

== Biography ==
Hill grew up in Melbourne. When he was 15, his father a highly respected professor of Physiology had a heart attack in front of him at age 41. Hill wanted to find out what a heart healthy diet looks like. He obtained a Master of Science in human nutrition from Deakin University. Hill is the nutrition advisor for Chris Hemsworth's fitness app, Centr. In 2019, he opened a restaurant, Eden Bondi at Campbell Parade, Bondi Beach. The restaurant was described as an "instant hit among vegans and non-vegans alike". It closed in December 2023.

In 2021, Hill authored The Proof is in the Plants. The book argues that a diet of at least 85% whole plant foods helps maintain a healthy weight and reduces risk of cancer and cardiovascular disease. A review by Seth Yoder of Red Pen Reviews gave the book a high score for its evidence-based claims and scientific accuracy. Yoder concluded that "The Proof is in the Plants is a well-researched book that argues that a whole foods plant-based diet is optimal for human health and the planet" but noted "the diet will likely also be expensive and difficult to follow in the long term".

Hill is the founder of the Plant Proof podcast. In 2022, the podcast went through a rebrand and is now known as The Proof. The podcast still focuses on nutrition but has expanded to other lifestyle factors that impact well-being including exercise, mental health and sleep.

In 2024, Hill released The living Proof Challenge, a zero-cost 12 week challenge to help people optimise important biomarkers to lower their risk of disease and live better for longer.

== Personal life ==
Hill is a multimillionaire. In 2016, he purchased an apartment in North Bondi that was previously owned by actor Simon Baker. In 2021, he purchased a $12.4 million house at Wategos Beach, Byron Bay. He has described his own diet as 'evidence-based', being mostly whole food plant-based.

== Selected publications ==
- The Proof is in the Plants: How Science Shows a Plant-Based Diet Could Save Your Life (And the Planet) (Penguin, 2021)
