= Victoria Park Nature Reserve =

Protected area in New South Wales, Australia

- IUCN category IV (habitat/species management area)
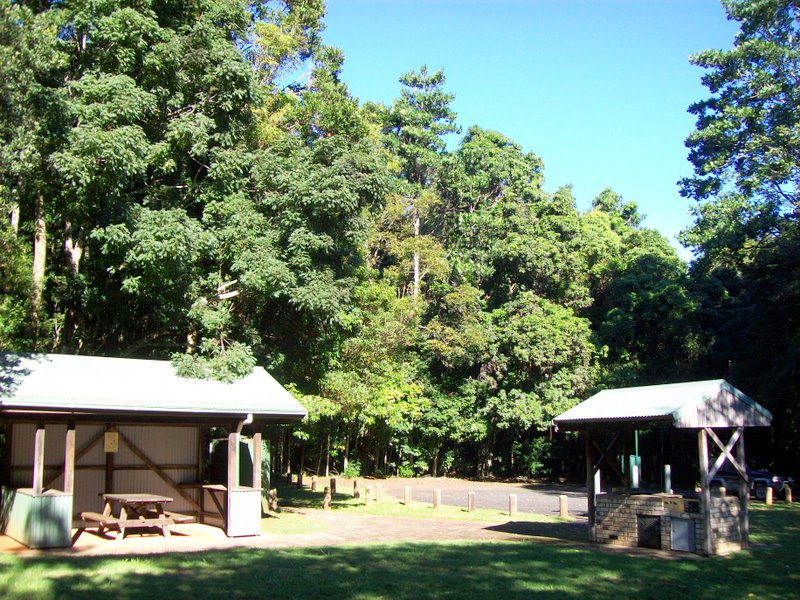
- A picnic area located in the reserve

- Location within New South Wales
- Location: New South Wales
- Nearest city: Alstonville
- Coordinates: 28°54.1′S 153°24.65248′E
- Area: 0.18 km^{2} (0.069 sq mi)
- Established: April 1975
- Governing body: NSW National Parks and Wildlife Service
- Website: Official website

The Victoria Park Nature Reserve is a protected nature reserve in the Northern Rivers region in the state of New South Wales, in eastern Australia. The sub-tropical jungle remnant is located an undulating high rainfall plain near Alstonville. The red-brown soil is derived from a basaltic flow from the nearby Mount Warning. Of the total land in the reserve, 8 hectares (20 acres) is original rainforest; the other areas are being re-vegetated.

== Features and location ==
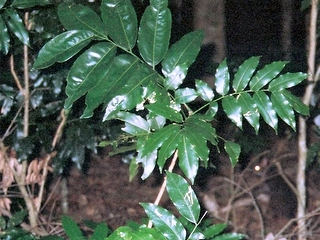
Rainforest understorey at Victoria Park Nature Reserve, with a juvenile black bean and an illuminated eye of the red-legged pademelon from the camera's flash (bottom right).

The reserve is one of a few small nature reserves including the Andrew Johnston Big Scrub, Hayters Hill, Davis Scrub, Boatharbour and Wilsons Peak flora and nature reserves that conserve rainforests typical of the once extensive Big Scrub. The Big Scrub comprised 75,000 hectares (190,000 acres) of lowland subtropical rainforest which was largely cleared for agriculture in the late 19th century.

Victoria Park is a popular area for picnics and barbecues. There is wheelchair access, a wooden boardwalk, pit toilets, tables, gas barbecues and information boards.

In this small area, a large diversity of flora exists. 82 tree species are included amongst the 152 plant species. Many types of vines, smaller plants and fungi grow here. Most of the animals are nocturnal, though red-legged pademelons are sometimes seen on the edges of the grassy area. Rainforest pigeons such as the wompoo fruit dove are often heard, but rarely seen. Land mullets may be heard crawling on the rainforest floor.

Significant rainforest tree species include Moreton Bay fig, strangler fig, long jack, black bean, white booyong, red bean and bumpy ash. Other notable species include while bean, macadamia, yellow kamala and the rare Baloghia marmorata.

A tourist attraction in the early 20th century was a giant Moreton Bay fig, around 60 metres (200 ft) tall, that was allegedly sighted by Captain Cook from HMS Endeavour in 1770. The tree was damaged by a storm in 1970 and died soon afterwards.

Re-vegetation of the previously cleared farmland is under progress. However, the removal of original jungle vegetation has caused a lack of soil nutrients. Despite this, wildlife corridors are slowly being created to link other nearby rainforest remnants.

== See also ==
- Protected areas of New South Wales
