= Big Scrub =

Subtropical rainforest in Australia

The Big Scrub was one of the largest areas (75,000 ha) of lowland subtropical rainforest in eastern Australia. It was intensively cleared for agricultural use in the 19th century (1801–1900) by settlers. By the late 19th century less than 1% remained and since then, the native forest area has almost doubled to 2%.

Located on the North Coast of New South Wales, between what is now the towns of Byron Bay (east) and Lismore (west), the core Big Scrub area consisted of an estimated 900 square kilometres of subtropical rainforest. It primarily grows on fertile basalt and floodplain derived soils.

== History ==
The Big Scrub existed in the Bundjalung Aboriginal Nation. Traditionally the Bundjalung (particularly those that spoke the Widgjabal language of the Bundjalung nation) traversed it via walking trails, and maintained a few grassed clearings for camping and hunting within the rainforest. Rainforest bushfoods were a regular part of the traditional Bundjalung diet, including staples like black bean, Castanospermum australe, which was detoxified before eating.

The Big Scrub was dominated by white booyong (Heritiera trifoliolata) and Australian red cedar (Toona australis). The latter was eagerly sought by the 'cedar getters' for its fine quality timber. The cedar getters were the first non-indigenous people to exploit the Big Scrub area.

Later, the Government of New South Wales gave allotments to potential farmers on the basis that they cleared it of rainforest. Hence, most of the Big Scrub was cleared, and the surviving Bundjalung were placed into reservations.

In the 20th century, interest in rainforest and conservation resulted in a greater effort to conserve the few remaining remnants of the Big Scrub. The major remnants are: the Booyong Flora Reserve, Victoria Park Nature Reserve, Davis Scrub Nature Reserve, Boatharbour, and Hayters Hill Nature Reserve. These remnants have been subject to ecological restoration projects which involves the removal of invasive non-native weeds.

Big Scrub remnants have become a source of native foods for cropping, especially in recent years. These include the macadamia nut, riberry and finger lime. Macadamia nut is now grown commercially over much of the former Big Scrub area, but the main species used in cropping, Macadamia integrifolia, did not naturally occur in the Big Scrub.

== Remnant trees of the Big Scrub ==
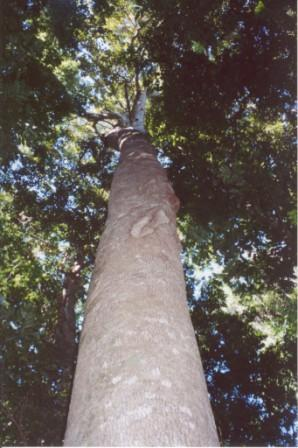
White beech in a remnant of the Big Scrub - Alstonville, NSW

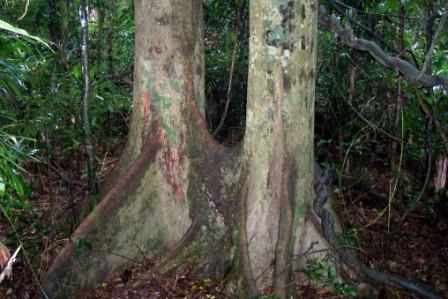
Twin white booyong growing in a remnant of the Big Scrub - Booyong Reserve, NSW

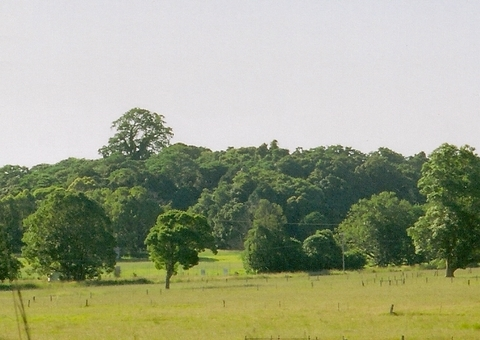
Emergent Moreton Bay fig growing in a remnant of the Big Scrub, Davis Scrub near Alstonville

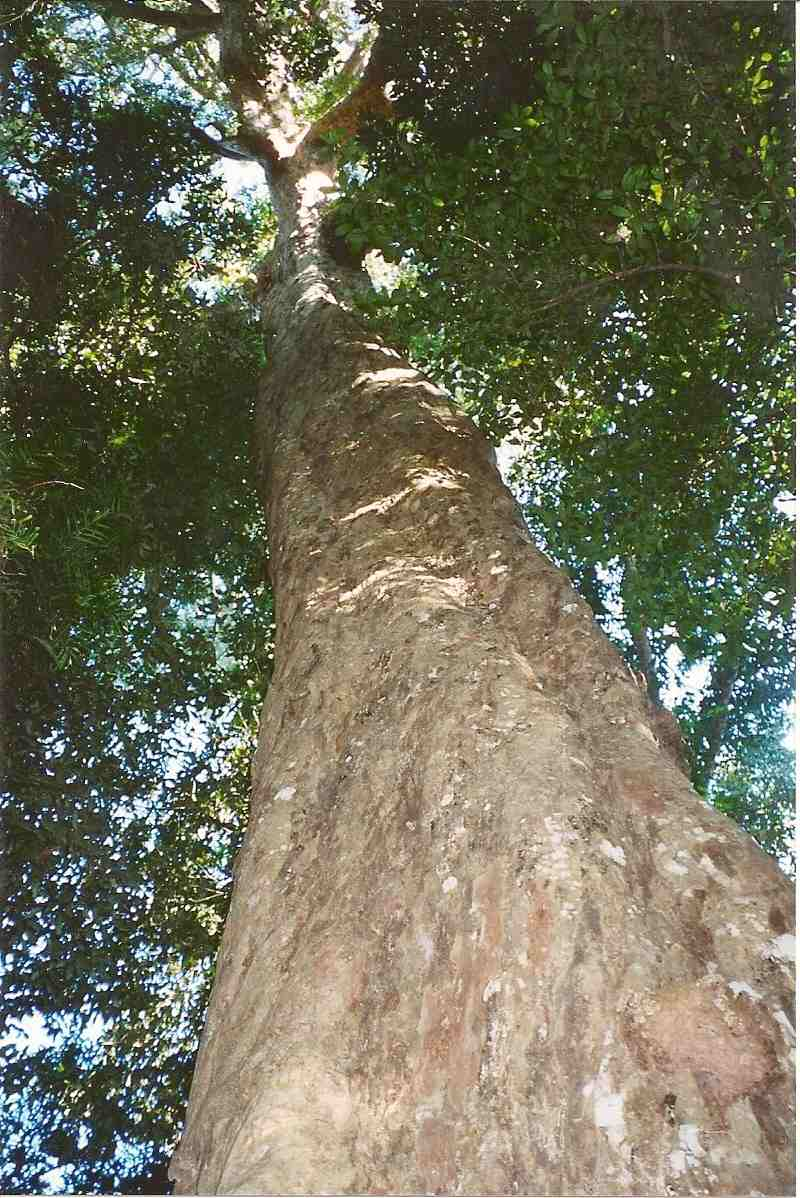
Syzygium francisii - Booyong Reserve, near Lismore, New South Wales

== Protection status ==
Parts of the Big Scrub have been listed as endangered ecological communities: ‘Lowland Rainforest of the NSW North Coast and Sydney Basin Bioregions’ and ‘Lowland rainforest on floodplain in the NSW North Coast Bioregion’ under the NSW Threatened Species Conservation Act, 1995 (TSC Act 1995)., ‘Lowland Rainforest of Subtropical Australia’ is also listed as a Critically Endangered Ecological Community under the Federal Environmental Protection and Biodiversity Conservation Act 1999 (EPBC Act 1999).

== See also ==
- Andrew Johnston Big Scrub Nature Reserve
- Booyong Flora Reserve
- Bungabbee State Forest
- Davis Scrub Nature Reserve
- Gondwana Rainforests of Australia
- Hayters Hill
- Victoria Park Nature Reserve
- Temperate and subtropical rainforests of New South Wales
