= Temperate and subtropical rainforests of New South Wales =

- A warm temperate rainforest at Monga National Park, on the South Coast

Ecology
- Realm: Australasian
- Biome: Temperate Broadleaf and Mixed Forests, Tropical and subtropical moist broadleaf forests

Geography
- Area: 1,980–3,350 km^{2} (760–1,290 mi^{2})
- Country: Australia
- State: New South Wales
- Elevation: 60–1,000 metres (200–3,280 ft)
- Geology: Sandstone, shale
- Climate type: Humid subtropical and oceanic climates
- Soil types: Clay-loam

The Temperate and subtropical rainforests of New South Wales comprise several rainforest vegetation classes found along the eastern coast, coastal ranges and escarpments of New South Wales, Australia. They form part of the broader rainforest vegetation formation in the NSW vegetation classification system, which includes Subtropical Rainforests, Northern Warm Temperate Rainforests, Southern Warm Temperate Rainforests and Cool Temperate Rainforests.

Occurring within the Eastern Australian temperate forests ecoregion, these rainforests are characterised by predominantly closed canopies of broad-leaved evergreen trees, with their floristic composition and structure varying according to climate, elevation and local environmental conditions. The Northern Warm Temperate Rainforests and subtropical rainforests are also represented within several protected areas of the Gondwana Rainforests of Australia, a World Heritage Site comprising rainforest reserves in north-eastern New South Wales and south-eastern Queensland.

== Habitat ==
The forests generally form tall, closed-canopy stands with a multilayered and often uneven canopy. In temperate rainforests, the main tree canopy typically reaches up to 30 metres (98 ft), while subtropical rainforests generally have trees 20–40 metres (66–131 ft) tall. The canopy typically comprises between four and 15 tree species and generally lacks emergent trees. Occasional climbing vines and epiphytes occur throughout the warm temperate forests, while the lower layers contain shrubs, saplings, ferns and herbs. Mosses, liverworts and lichens may also grow on tree trunks and the forest floor. In Cool Temperate Rainforests, trees generally have small leaves and palms are absent. The understorey is also dominated by tree ferns and ground ferns. Epiphytes and climbing vines are relatively scarce though, with only a few species present.

The North and South Warm Temperate Rainforest community generally occurs in sheltered gullies and on slopes in hilly or steep terrain, where high rainfall and protection from fire maintain moist conditions. In Sydney, it grows on fertile clay-loam soils derived from underlying Narrabeen Shale and, occasionally, basalt. Combined with high coastal rainfall exceeding 1,200 mm annually and a warm climate, these conditions support extensive areas of rainforest at elevations below 350 metres above sea level. They grow on moderately fertile soils derived from a range of geological substrates, including granite, rhyolite, syenite and sedimentary rocks. Below the canopy, tall palms, shade-tolerant shrubs and small trees of varying heights form a dense understorey above a relatively sparse ground layer of ferns. These rainforests are deeply shaded environments that are largely free from frequent, intense fires. Such conditions support a diverse range of ferns and climbing vines, including epiphytes such as the bird's nest fern (Asplenium australasicum), which grows on tree branches, and rhizomatous ferns that climb over rocks, fallen logs and tree trunks.

Cool Temperate Rainforests generally occur in upper gullies, on slopes and summits of mountainous terrain and plateaux, where high rainfall and frequent mist maintain moist conditions. They are typically found above 800–900 metres in elevation, on fertile soils derived from basalt and other geological substrates, including granite and siltstone. Orographic effects contribute to high annual rainfall, which can exceed 1,750 mm in northern New South Wales and is approximately 1,000 mm in parts of southern New South Wales.

Subtropical rainforests generally occur along the north-eastern coast and hinterland of New South Wales. Commonly associated with annual rainfall exceeding 1,300 mm, they are characterised by warm, humid conditions, fertile soils and a dense, multilayered canopy of predominantly evergreen broad-leaved trees.

=== Vegetation and biodiversity ===
A rainforest gully in the Blue Mountains with ferns and moss-covered rocks and tree roots.

The canopy in the North and South Warm Temperate Rainforests is commonly dominated by coachwood (Ceratopetalum apetalum), lilly pilly (Acmena smithii) and sassafras (Doryphora sassafras). Other tree species include hard corkwood (Endiandra sieberi), sweet pittosporum (Pittosporum undulatum) and possumwood (Quintinia sieberi). Further north, soft corkwood (Caldcluvia paniculosa), bastard rosewood (Synoum glandulosum) and prickly ash (Orites excelsa) become more prominent. The mountain frog is a subtropical rainforest endemic which dwells in rainforest enclaves in south-east Queensland and north-eastern New South Wales. Cabbage tree palms (Livistona australis) are prominent in the sub-canopy, while sandpaper figs (Ficus coronata) occur occasionally where conditions are suitable.

The shrub and small-tree layer in the Southern Warm Temperate Rainforests includes species such as Coprosma quadrifida, Eupomatia laurina, Hedycarya angustifolia and Rapanea howittiana. Climbing and scrambling plants include Cissus hypoglauca, Gynochthodes jasminoides, Marsdenia rostrata, Morinda jasminoides and Smilax australis.

North of Barrington Tops, the canopy of Cool Temperate Rainforests is dominated by Cryptocarya nova-anglica, Elaeocarpus holopetalus, Nothofagus moorei and Quintinia sieberi. South of Barrington Tops, the predominant canopy species include Acacia melanoxylon, Atherosperma moschatum, Doryphora sassafras, Elaeocarpus holopetalus and Eucryphia moorei. Common shrubs scattered throughout the community include Coprosma quadrifida and Hedycarya angustifolia. North of Barrington Tops, the shrub layer is dominated by Aristotelia australasica, Orites excelsa, Tasmannia stipitata, Trochocarpa sp. A and Vesselowskya rubifolia. South of Barrington Tops, Tasmannia lanceolata is the predominant shrub species.

Subtropical rainforests feature woody vines, epiphytes, ferns, palms and strangler figs. Trees are generally buttressed, encompassing an uneven canopy with a diverse range of leaf sizes, lianas and epiphytes, with abundant leaf litter in the ground. Common tree species found in the subtropical rainforests include Toona ciliata, Argyrodendron actinophyllum, Argyrodendron trifoliolatum, Archontophoenix cunninghamiana, Brachychiton acerifolius, Dendrocnide excelsa, Diploglottis australis, Pennantia cunninghamii and Baloghia inophylla.

== Distribution ==
Location of Gondwanan subtropical rainforests in New South Wales.

Northern Warm Temperate Forests occur along the coastal escarpment and associated foothills, extending from the Queensland border southwards to Batemans Bay. More specifically, the community extends from around Batemans Bay northwards to Mountain Lagoon in the lower Blue Mountains and the Watagan Ranges on the Central Coast. Extensive stands occur in areas such as Washpool National Park, Dorrigo National Park, Werrikimbe National Park and the Illawarra escarpment, while smaller, isolated patches are found throughout the Blue Mountains. The vegetation community is largely confined to New South Wales.

Southern Warm Temperate Rainforests generally occurs in small, scattered stands, rarely exceeding 50–100 hectares, although such patches may be locally common. The undulating terrain of the Robertson Plateau supports the largest areas of high-elevation Southern Warm Temperate Rainforest, although much of this vegetation has been extensively cleared. It transitions into Northern Warm Temperate Rainforests to the north of Batemans Bay and into Southern Cool Temperate Rainforests at elevations above approximately 800 metres.

Cool Temperate Rainforests occur in scattered stands along the higher sections of the Great Dividing Range, extending from the Lamington Plateau in south-eastern Queensland through the Border Ranges and Barrington Tops in northern New South Wales, and southwards from the Budawang Range into Victoria. Their distribution is concentrated primarily in north-eastern New South Wales and the adjacent tablelands of south-eastern Queensland. In New South Wales, these rainforests occur in scattered stands along the higher parts of the Great Dividing Range and coastal escarpment, extending from the Border Ranges and Barrington Tops southwards through the Budawang Range and into Victoria. Their distribution is concentrated in north-eastern New South Wales and the adjacent Lamington Plateau in south-eastern Queensland, with further occurrences along the eastern highlands of south-eastern Australia.

Subtropical rainforests occur in north-eastern New South Wales, particularly around the Border Ranges (Border Ranges National Park), Nightcap National Park, Dorrigo National Park, Budderoo National Park, Mount Warning, Big Scrub and Comboyne Plateau, with more isolated and fragmented communities extending south into the Illawarra and Shoalhaven regions. Historically, extensive areas were cleared for agriculture and settlement, particularly in the Big Scrub, once one of Australia's largest continuous subtropical rainforest areas, as well as on the Comboyne Plateau and in the Kiama district. The Illawarra–Shoalhaven subtropical rainforest ecological community is listed as critically endangered under Commonwealth legislation.

=== Sydney ===
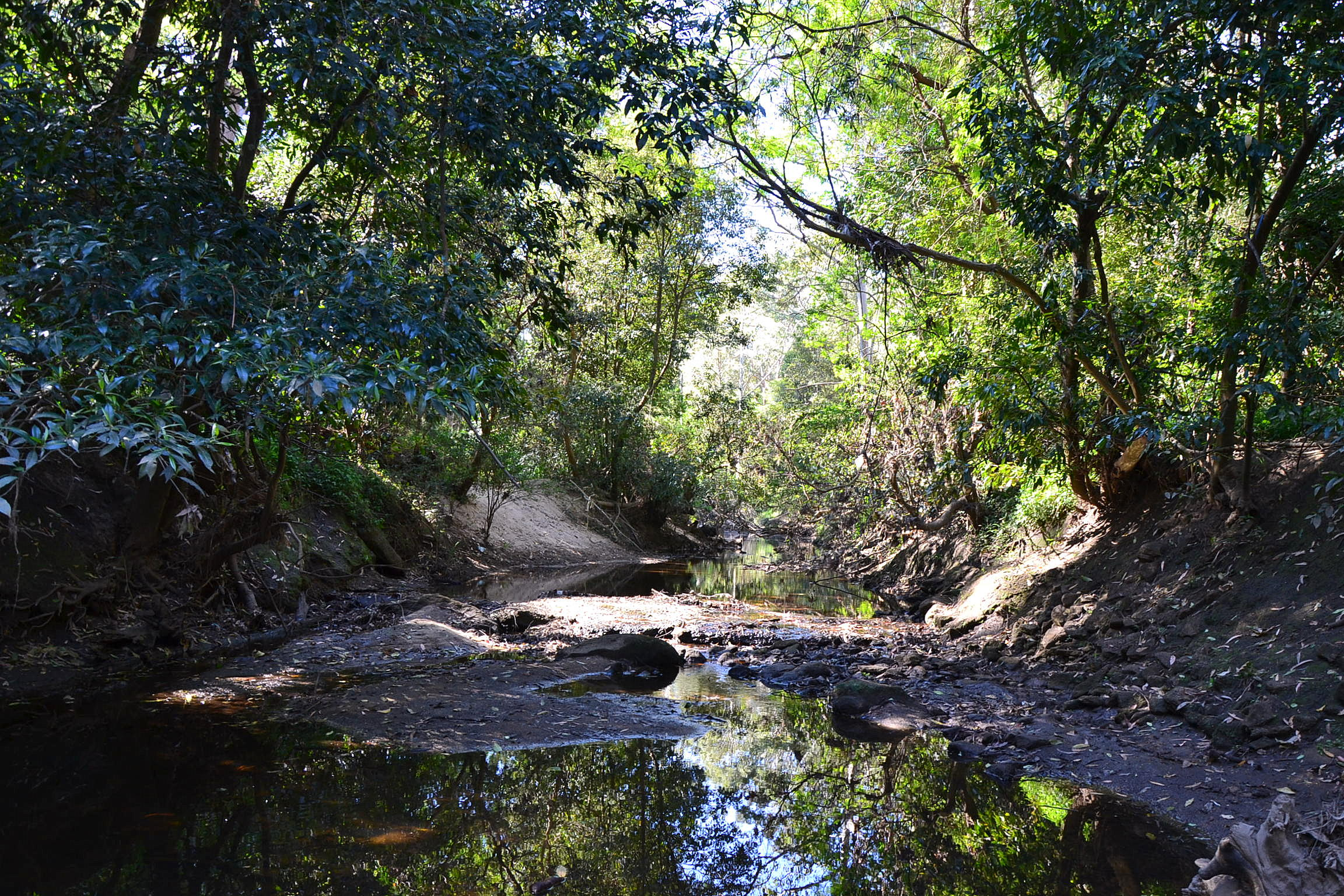
Lane Cove River flowing through rainforest vegetation in Lane Cove National Park, Sydney.

Within the Sydney region, Northern Warm Temperate Rainforest occurs in the deeply sheltered gullies of the Hacking River and around Lady Carrington Drive in Royal National Park, with less diverse stands found in Ku-ring-gai Chase National Park. Coastal Sandstone Gallery Rainforest has relatively low plant species diversity compared with rainforest communities occurring on more fertile soils. Unlike many other rainforest types, it generally lacks an extensive array of climbing vines and lianas. Instead, the ground layer consists of scattered ferns growing among sandstone boulders and fallen logs. In the City of Ryde, remnant patches of Coastal Sandstone Gallery Rainforest occur along Terrys Creek, Kittys Creek and the Lane Cove River.

Coastal Sandstone Gallery Rainforest occurs in narrow, isolated patches on Hawkesbury Sandstone, typically within deeply incised gullies and areas of sandstone alluvium. It is associated with areas receiving relatively high annual rainfall, generally exceeding 900 mm, and is more common in the eastern parts of the Hornsby Plateau and Woronora Plateau. Other occurrences are found in the hinterland of the Hawkesbury River, the lower Blue Mountains and the eastern Hunter Region. The community is represented in several protected areas, including Lane Cove National Park, Dharawal Nature Reserve, Ku-ring-gai Chase National Park, Royal National Park, Georges River National Park, Garigal National Park and Sydney Harbour National Park.

The Sydney Coastal Lilly Pilly–Palm Gallery Rainforest is another coastal rainforest community, occurring in sheltered gullies and on lowland slopes from Seal Rocks south to Bundeena.

== Communities ==
Victoria Park Nature Reserve, Alstonville

An Antarctic beech cool temperate rainforest in Barrington Tops National Park

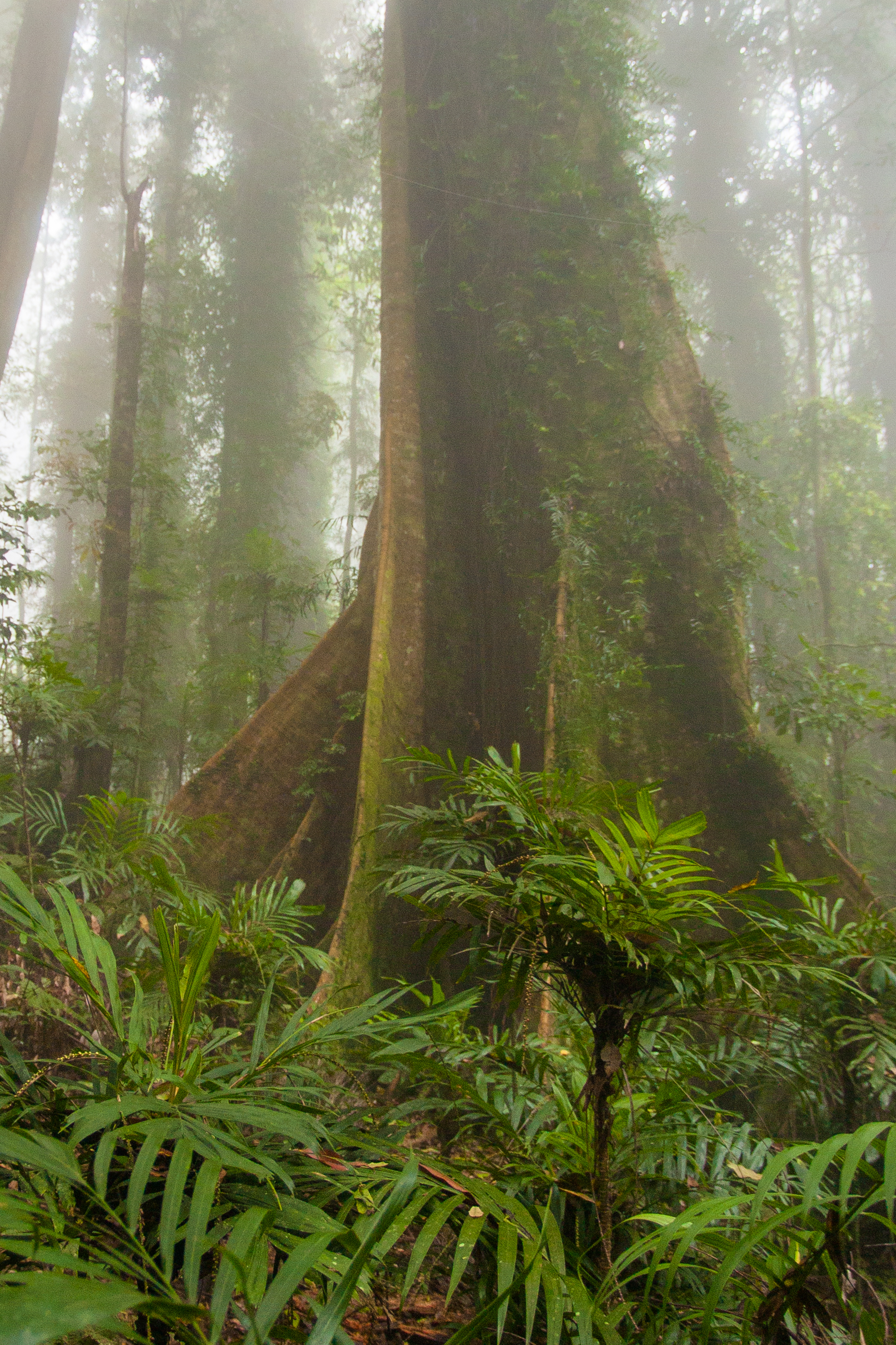
Subtropical rainforest in Dorrigo National Park, featuring large buttressed trees.

| Plant community type | PCT number | General distribution |
Subtropical Rainforests
| Lismore Basalt Subtropical Rainforest | 3001 | Lismore district |
| Lower Richmond Hills Dry-Subtropical Rainforest | 3002 | Lower Richmond Valley |
| Border Ranges Black Booyong Subtropical Rainforest | 3003 | Border Ranges |
| Far North Bangalow Palm Swamp Forest | 3004 | Far North Coast |
| Far North Floodplain Subtropical Rainforest | 3005 | Far North Coast floodplains |
| Far North Riverine Bangalow Palm Subtropical Rainforest | 3006 | Far North river valleys |
| Far North Lowland Black Bean Riverine Rainforest | 3007 | Far North Coast lowlands |
| Far North Lowland Sub-Littoral Rainforest | 3008 | Far North coastal lowlands |
| Far North Lowland Palm Gully Rainforest | 3009 | Far North Coast |
| Far North Lowland Subtropical Rainforest | 3011 | Far North Coast lowlands |
| Far North Waterhousea Riparian Rainforest | 3012 | Far North river valleys |
| Illawarra Lowland Subtropical Rainforest | 3013 | Illawarra lowlands |
| Lower Richmond Sandflat Subtropical Rainforest | 3015 | Lower Richmond Valley |
| Lower Tweed Hills Subtropical Dry Rainforest | 3016 | Tweed Valley hinterland |
| Mid North Lowland Floodplain Rainforest | 3017 | Mid North Coast floodplains |
| Northern Hinterland Baloghia-Booyong Subtropical Rainforest | 3019 | Northern NSW hinterland |
| Northern Lowland Subtropical Rainforest | 3021 | Northern NSW lowlands |
| Port Macquarie Coastal Subtropical Rainforest | 3022 | Port Macquarie coastal district |
| South Coast Warm Temperate-Subtropical Rainforest | 3036 | South Coast |
Northern Warm Temperate Rainforests
| Comboyne Plateau Warm Temperate Rainforest | 3026 | Comboyne Plateau |
| Central Coast Gallery Rainforest | 3025 | Central Coast |
| Illawarra Escarpment Warm Temperate Rainforest | 3028 | Illawarra Escarpment |
| Lower North Wet Gully Palm Rainforest | 3029 | North Coast |
| Nattai Plateau Callicoma Gully Rainforest | 3030 | Southern Sydney Basin |
| Northern Escarpment Coachwood–Beech Rainforest | 3031 | Northern escarpment |
| Northern Escarpment Sassafras–Booyong–Corkwood Rainforest | 3032 | Northern escarpment |
| Northern Escarpment Sassafras–Prickly Ash Rainforest | 3033 | Northern escarpment |
| Northern Gorges Riparian Rainforest | 3034 | Northern NSW gorges |
| Northern Ranges Coachwood Warm Temperate Rainforest | 3035 | Northern NSW ranges |
| Sydney Basin Warm Temperate Rainforest | 3037 | Sydney Basin |
| Sydney Coastal Coachwood Gallery Rainforest | 3038 | Sydney region |
| Sydney Coastal Lilly Pilly–Palm Gallery Rainforest | 3039 | Sydney region |
| Sydney Coastal Foreshores Gully Rainforest | 3040 | Sydney region |
| Sydney Sandstone Coachwood–Grey Myrtle Rainforest | 3041 | Sydney region |
| Tenterfield Rocky Gully Rainforest | 3042 | Northern NSW |
| Upper Blue Mountains Gully Rainforest | 3043 | Blue Mountains |
| Watchimbark Serpentinite Lilly Pilly–Fig Rainforest | 3044 | Northern NSW |
Southern Warm Temperate Rainforests
| South Coast Temperate Gully Rainforest | 3045 | South Coast |
| Southeast Warm Temperate Rainforest | 3046 | South-eastern NSW |
| Sydney Montane Basalt Rainforest | 3047 | Sydney Basin and Robertson Plateau |
Cool Temperate Rainforests
| Border Ranges Antarctic Beech Rainforest | 3048 | Border Ranges |
| Kosciuszko Cool Temperate Rainforest | 3049 | Kosciuszko region |
| Mount Bajimba Antarctic Beech Rainforest | 3050 | Mount Bajimba |
| Mount Royal Range Cool Temperate Rainforest | 3051 | Mount Royal Range |
| Northern Escarpment Antarctic Beech Rainforest | 3052 | Northern escarpment |
| Northern Escarpment Sassafras Rainforest | 3053 | Northern escarpment |
| Southeast Cool Temperate Rainforest | 3054 | South-eastern NSW |

== See also ==
- Gondwana Rainforests
- Western Sydney Dry Rainforest
- Rainforests and vine thickets
- Queensland tropical rain forests
- Southeast Australia temperate forests
