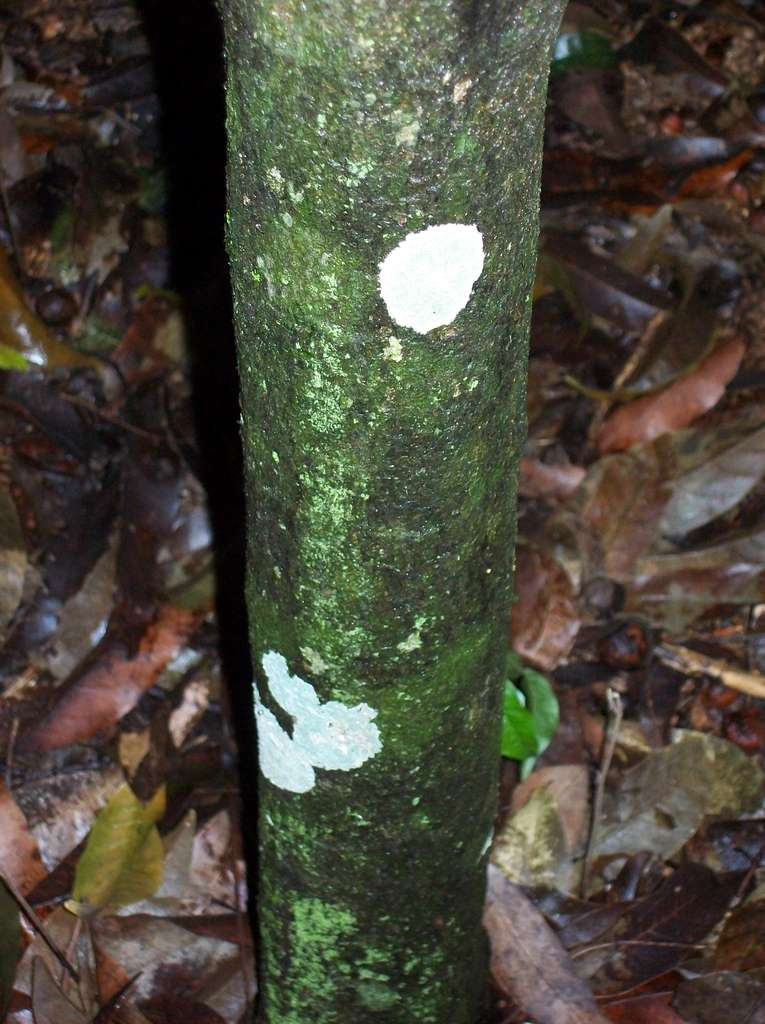

Conservation status
- Endangered (EPBC Act)

Scientific classification
- Kingdom: Plantae
- Clade: Tracheophytes
- Clade: Angiosperms
- Clade: Eudicots
- Clade: Asterids
- Order: Gentianales
- Family: Apocynaceae
- Genus: Ochrosia
- Species: O. moorei

Binomial name
- Ochrosia moorei (F.Muell.) F.Muell. ex Benth.

= Ochrosia moorei =

Species of tree

Ochrosia moorei, known as the southern ochrosia is a rainforest plant of eastern Australia. Endangered by extinction, it has a ROTAP rating of 2ECi.

The habitat is sub tropical rainforest in north eastern New South Wales and south eastern Queensland. It grows in certain Big Scrub remnants such as Booyong Flora Reserve and Andrew Johnston Big Scrub Nature Reserve. The range of distribution is from the Richmond River, New South Wales to Currumbin Creek, just over the state border.

The generic name Ochrosia refers to the yellow colour of the wood and flowers of certain members of this genus. It is one of the many species named after the botanist, Charles Moore.

== Description ==
A small tree or shrub, up to 11 metres in height with a stem diameter of 25 cm. The plant often has multiple stems, the trunk can be cylindrical or irregular. Bark is dark brown or black. With many cracks, fissures and pustules of a lighter colour. Small branches are also dark brown or purplish black, more green towards the end.

Leaves opposite on the stem, or occasionally in threes. 6 to 18 cm long, 1.8 to 4 cm wide. The leaf shape tapers to the leaf stalk where it joins the branchlet. Over 40 lateral veins join the midrib, joining at nearly 90 degrees to the midrib. At the other end, the lateral veins form into an intramarginal vein, which circles the leaf. Veins are clearly seen on both surfaces. Mid rib raised below the leaf, but sunken above the leaf. Leaf stalk 5 to 15 mm long. Broken leaves exude a white milky sap.

=== Flowers & fruit ===
White flowers form on cymes, which appear at the end of branches in December to February. A year later, a bright red drupe matures. 4 to 8 cm long, oblong. Inside is a woody centre, with seeds in cavities on either side of the central groove. Seeds 10 to 14 mm long, 5 to 7 mm wide and 1 mm deep.
