= Hayters Hill Nature Reserve =

Protected area in New South Wales, Australia

- IUCN category IV (habitat/species management area)
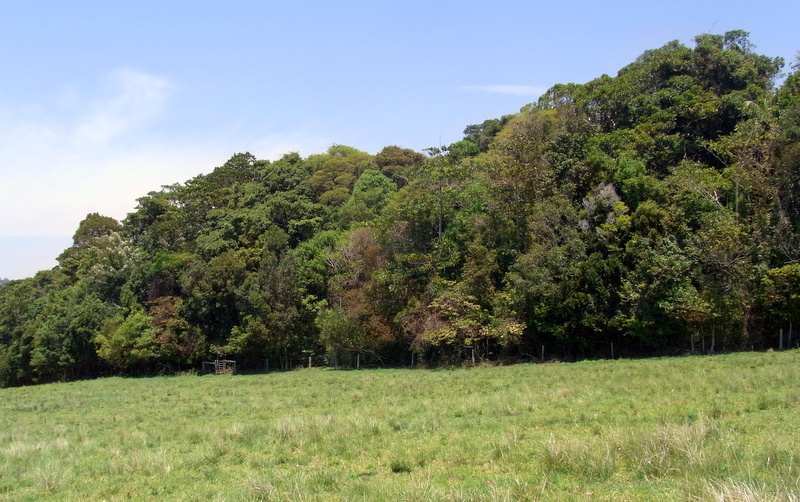
- Part of the remnant rainforest in the reserve

- Location within New South Wales
- Location: New South Wales
- Nearest city: Byron Bay
- Coordinates: 28°40.236′S 153°35.099′E
- Area: 0.08 km^{2} (0.031 sq mi)
- Established: January 1989
- Governing body: NSW National Parks and Wildlife Service
- Website: Official website

The Hayters Hill Nature Reserve is a protected nature reserve in the Northern Rivers region in the state of New South Wales, in eastern Australia. The 8-hectare (20-acre) forest remnant is located on high ground some 5 kilometres (3.1 mi) southwest of Byron Bay.

== Features and location ==
The reserve is one of a few small nature reserves including the Andrew Johnston Big Scrub, Victoria Park, Davis Scrub, Boatharbour and Wilsons Peak flora and nature reserves that conserve rainforests typical of the once extensive Big Scrub. The Big Scrub comprised 75,000 hectares (190,000 acres) of lowland subtropical rainforest which was largely cleared for agriculture in the late 19th century.

The reserve is situated on traditional country of the indigenous Arakwal people.

== See also ==
- Protected areas of New South Wales
