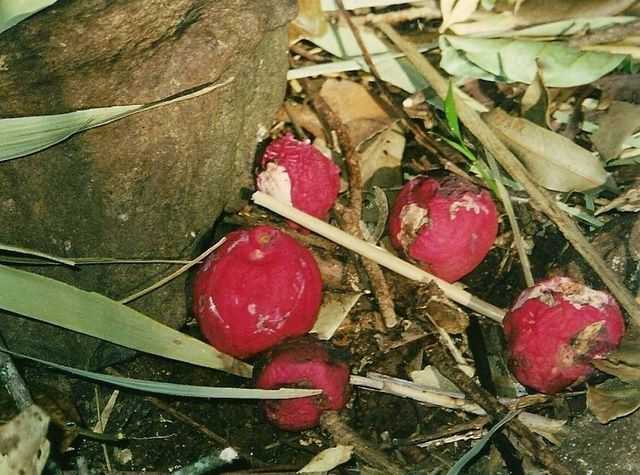
- Syzygium ingens fruit on the rainforest floor, Hayters Hill near Byron Bay

Scientific classification
- Kingdom: Plantae
- Clade: Tracheophytes
- Clade: Angiosperms
- Clade: Eudicots
- Clade: Rosids
- Order: Myrtales
- Family: Myrtaceae
- Genus: Syzygium
- Species: S. ingens

Binomial name
- Syzygium ingens (F.Muell. ex C.Moore) Craven & Biffin

Synonyms
- List: Acmena australis L.A.S.Johnson nom. illeg., nom. superfl.; Acmena brachyandra (Maiden & Betche) Merr. & L.M.Perry; Acmena ingens (F.Muell. ex C.Moore) Guymer & B.Hyland; Eugenia brachyandra Maiden & Betche; Memecylon australe C.Moore nom. illeg.; Memecylon cerasiforme A.Nilson nom. illeg.; Memecylon cerasiformis A.Nilson orth. var.; Nelitris ingens F.Muell. ex C.Moore

= Syzygium ingens =

Red apple

Species of tree

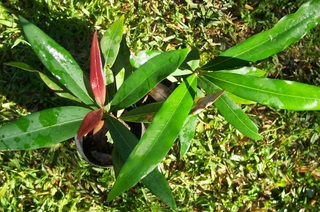
Juvenile leaves at Mount Glorious, Queensland

Syzygium ingens, commonly known as red apple, is a species of flowering plant that is endemic to eastern Australia. It is a medium-sized to tall rainforest tree with narrow elliptic to oblong leaves and panicles of white flowers on the ends of branchlets, followed by spherical red berries.

== Description ==
Syzygium ingens is a tree that typically grows to a height of up to 40 m (130 ft) with a dbh of up to 90 cm (35 in). It has a smooth, straight, greyish or fawn-coloured trunk that is buttressed at the base of older specimens. The leaves are arranged in opposite pairs, narrow elliptic to oblong, 60–180 mm (2.4–7.1 in) long and 20–50 mm (0.79–1.97 in) wide on a reddish petiole 2–8 mm (0.079–0.315 in) long. The upper surface of the leaves is glossy green and the lower surface is paler with a raised mid-rib. The flowers are borne in panicles on the ends of branchlets, the panicles shorter than the leaves. The five sepals are fused at the base forming a bell-shaped floral cup about 3 mm (0.12 in) in diameter with rounded lobes. The five petals are white, more or less oblong and 1–2 mm (0.039–0.079 in) long with irregular edges. Flowering occurs from November to December and the fruit is a dark pink to red, spherical to oval berry, 25–30 mm (0.98–1.18 in) long, 15–40 mm (0.59–1.57 in) in diameter containing a single seed surrounded by white flesh.

== Taxonomy ==
Red apple was first formally described in 1861 by Charles Moore in Catalogue of the Natural and Industrial Products of New South Wales, exhibited in the School of Arts by the International Exhibition Commissioners and was given the name Nelitris ingens from an unpublished description by Ferdinand von Mueller. In 1988, Gordon P. Guymer and Bernard Hyland changed the name to Acmena ingens in the journal Muelleria, a name that is accepted by the National Herbarium of New South Wales.

In 2006, Lyndley Craven and Edward Sturt Biffin changed Moore's name Nelitris ingens to Syzygium ingens in the journal Blumea, the name accepted by the Australian Plant Census

== Distribution and habitat ==
Red apple grows on volcanic soil from near Gympie in south eastern Queensland to Casino in northern New South Wales.

== Ecology ==
Birds seen eating the fruit of this species include wompoo fruit dove, green catbird, eastern rosella, pied currawong and topknot pigeon.

== Use in horticulture ==
Germination is assisted by removing the seed from the flesh, and soaking for a day or two to kill any insect larvae. Germination is swift and reliable. Cuttings also strike well.
