= Davis Scrub Nature Reserve =

Protected area in New South Wales, Australia

- IUCN category IV (habitat/species management area)
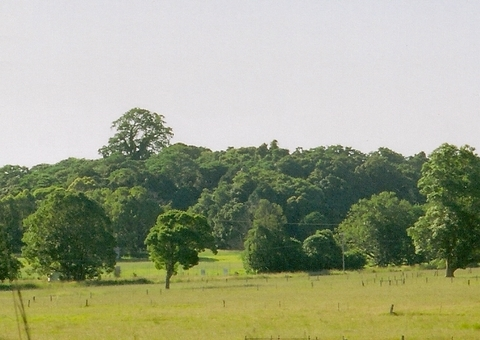
- Ficus macrophylla located in the reserve

- Location within New South Wales
- Location: New South Wales
- Nearest city: Alstonville
- Coordinates: 28°51.9543′S 153°24.285′E
- Area: 0.13 km^{2} (0.050 sq mi)
- Established: May 1980
- Governing body: NSW National Parks and Wildlife Service
- Website: Official website

The Davis Scrub Nature Reserve is a protected nature reserve in the Northern Rivers region of New South Wales, Australia. The 13-hectare (32-acre) reserve is a sub tropical rainforest remnant of the Big Scrub and is situated at 170 metres (560 ft) above sea level on an undulating high rainfall plain near Alstonville.

The red-brown soil is derived from a basaltic flow from the nearby Mount Warning. Significant rainforest tree species include Moreton Bay fig, black bean, white booyong, red bean, and purple cherry. A large Moreton Bay fig dominates the rainforest horizon.

The reserve is located at an altitude of 165 meters.

== See also ==
- Booyong Flora Reserve
- Protected areas of New South Wales
