= Russell Strong =

Australian transplant surgeon (born 1938)

Russell Walker Strong, AC CMG (born April 1938) is an Australian transplant surgeon. He pioneered several techniques for liver transplantation, including reduced-size liver transplantation, split-liver transplantation, and living donor liver transplantation.

== Early life ==
Strong was born in Coraki, New South Wales, and raised in Alstonville, where his father worked in a butter factory. He attended Lismore High School and then the University of Sydney. He graduated with a degree in dentistry, but he was unable to practise outside the Sydney Dental Hospital as he was still legally a minor at the age of 20. He developed an interest in maxillofacial surgery – especially facial reconstruction after traumatic injuries – and so he decided to study medicine. He moved to the United Kingdom to attend medical school, funding his studies through part-time dentistry work and his wife's work as a pharmacist. After graduating from the University of London in 1960, he held a series of surgical training positions in England, during which time his interest shifted from maxillofacial surgery to general surgery.

== Surgical career ==
Strong and his wife Judith returned to Australia in 1973, and he took up a post as Director of Surgery at the Princess Alexandra Hospital, Brisbane. He became focused on hepatobiliary surgery due to the seriousness of liver injuries caused by road accidents. He spent three months studying under the organ transplantation expert Thomas Starzl at the University of Pittsburgh Medical Center in the early 1980s, and proposed the creation of an Australian liver transplantation program in 1983. He went on to perform Australia's first orthotopic liver transplants (wherein the full donor liver is transplanted into its usual place in the body) in an adult and in a child in 1985. These procedures were controversial in Australia at the time, and his paediatric liver transplant efforts were derided in a Medical Journal of Australia editorial titled "Surgery runs amok".

In 1987, Strong performed one of the world's first reduced-size liver transplantations – wherein a full-sized liver from an adult donor is cut down to be transplanted into a child or infant – in a six-month-old child dying from liver failure. The method he used has since been termed the "Brisbane Technique", and became commonplace in paediatric liver transplantation. Beginning in 1989, he pioneered split-liver transplantation – where a single donor liver is split between multiple recipients – and his unit in Brisbane were the only surgeons in Australia to use the technique until 2000. In 1989, Strong carried out the world's first liver transplant from a living donor, which took place from a mother to her son and was reported in The New England Journal of Medicine and the international press.

Strong lived in Kuala Lumpur in 2004–2005, where he helped to establish a national liver transplantation program. After his retirement from surgery, he became the medical director of Queenslanders Donate, an organ donation service.

== Honours ==
Strong was appointed a Companion of the Order of St Michael and St George on 10th January, 1987 for services to medicine.

Strong was appointed a Companion of the Order of Australia in 2001 "for service to medicine as a pioneer in the development of new techniques and improved clinical performance in the field of liver transplant surgery and to advancing world knowledge in this area". He was awarded the International Society of Surgery's prize in 2001 for his contributions to liver transplantation and was conferred a Malaysian Datukship by King Mizan Zainal Abidin of Terengganu in 2010.
