= Booyong Flora Reserve =

Protected area in New South Wales, Australia

- IUCN category Ia (strict nature reserve)
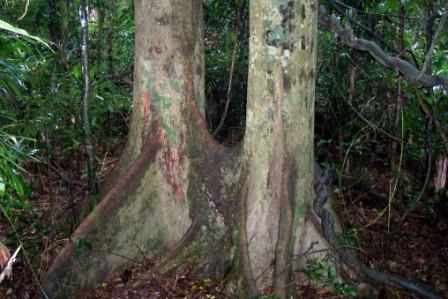
- White booyong located in the reserve

- Location within New South Wales
- Location: New South Wales
- Nearest city: Lismore
- Coordinates: 28°44.6205′S 153°26.90418′E
- Area: 0.13 km^{2} (0.050 sq mi)
- Governing body: NSW National Parks & Wildlife Service

The Booyong Flora Reserve is a protected nature reserve located in Booyong in the Northern Rivers region of New South Wales, Australia. The 13-hectare (32-acre) sub–tropical jungle is situated 18 kilometres (11 mi) northeast of Lismore and is a remnant of the Big Scrub, of which less than one percent of the original Big Scrub remains.

== Description ==
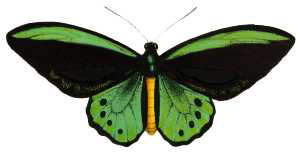
The Richmond birdwing, which may be found in the reserve.

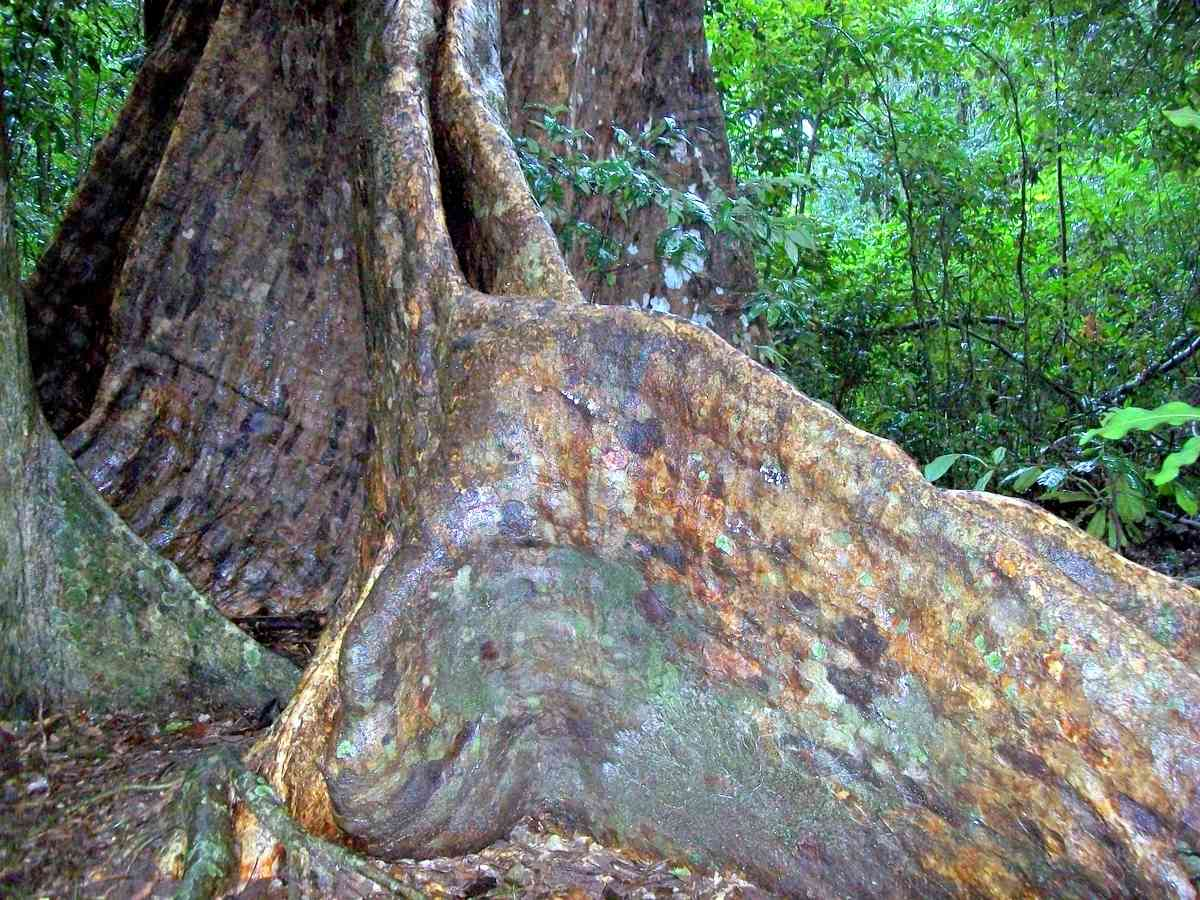
Buttressed roots of a large Francis water gum at Booyong Flora Reserve

The red-brown soil is derived from a basaltic flow from the nearby Mount Warning and later volcanic flows from the Nightcap Range. Average annual rainfall at Lismore is 1,340 millimetres (53 in).

90 species of rainforest trees have been recorded in this small area. Significant rainforest tree species include white booyong, small-leaved fig, Oliver's sassafras, black bean, grey walnut, blush walnut, koda, red cedar, white beech, pepperberry and hard quandong. Rainforest myrtles at Booyong reserve are well represented. The most striking are the large Francis water gums; one of which has a 4-metre (13 ft) wide girth.

A sealed road divides the reserve, with a grassy area in the western corner, surrounded by rainforest. Another grassy area to the north by the railway line also abuts onto the rainforest.

A colony of grey-headed flying fox lives in this reserve. The spectacular Richmond birdwing butterfly may be seen here, as its food plant grows in this rainforest.

== See also ==
- Andrew Johnston Big Scrub Nature Reserve
- Protected areas of New South Wales
