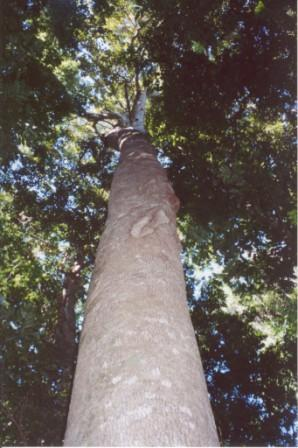
- Gmelina leichhardtii at Davis Scrub Nature Reserve, Australia

Scientific classification
- Kingdom: Plantae
- Clade: Embryophytes
- Clade: Tracheophytes
- Clade: Angiosperms
- Clade: Eudicots
- Clade: Asterids
- Order: Lamiales
- Family: Lamiaceae
- Genus: Gmelina
- Species: G. leichhardtii

Binomial name
- Gmelina leichhardtii (F. Muell.) Benth.

Synonyms
- Vitex leichhardtii F.Muell.

= Gmelina leichhardtii =

Species of tree

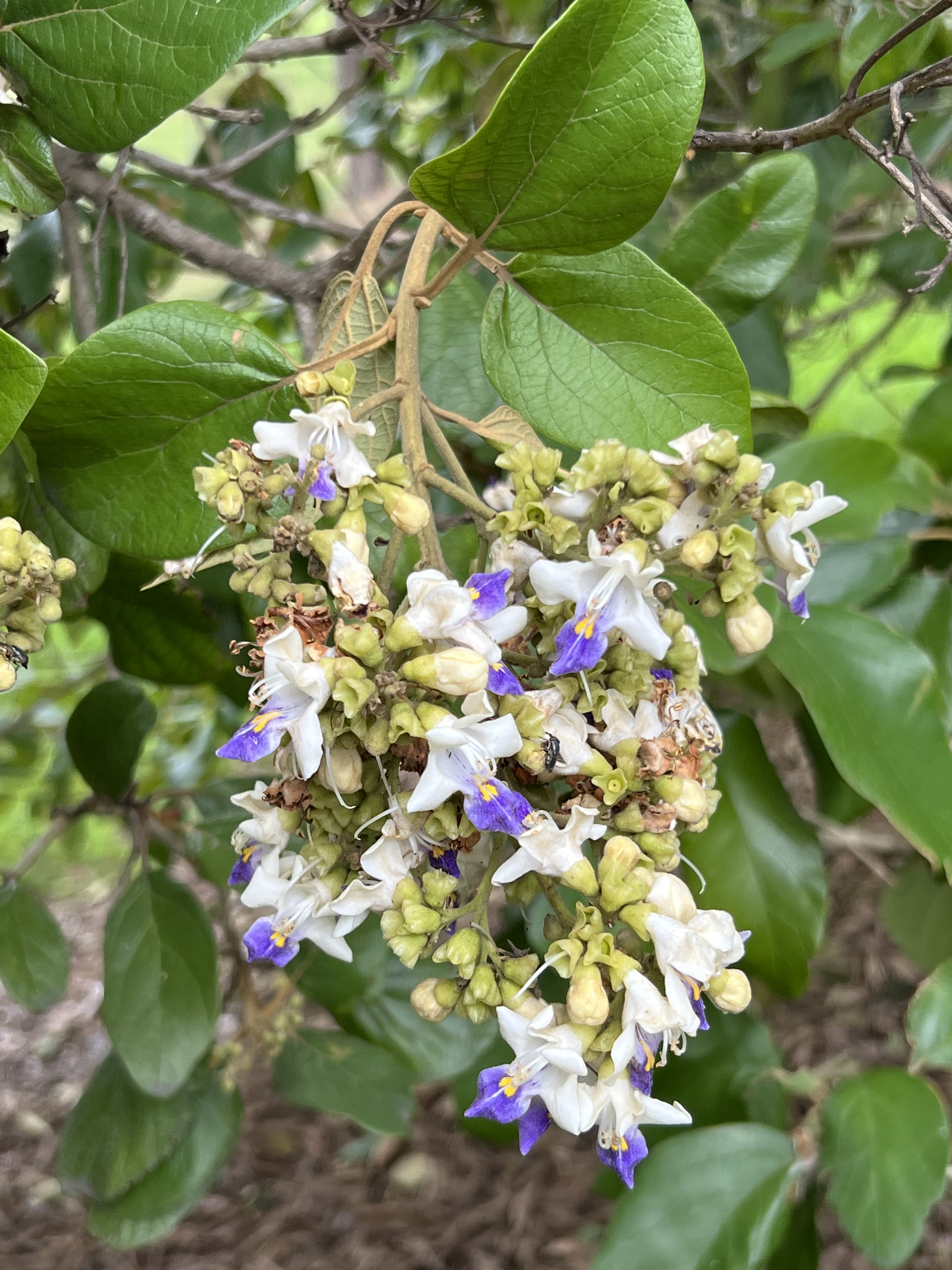
Flowers

Gmelina leichhardtii, the white beech, is a tree of eastern Australia. Scattered individuals or small groups of trees naturally occur from the Illawarra district of New South Wales (34½° S) to near Proserpine in tropical Queensland. The white beech or grey teak is a fast-growing tree, growing on volcanic and alluvial soils in areas of moderate to high rainfall. It also grows on poorer sedimentary soils in fire free areas. White beech may occasionally be seen in Australian rainforests, though their status is considered "uncommon". Unlike the Australian red cedar, the white beech has not recovered particularly well after logging in the 19th and 20th centuries.

== Taxonomy and naming ==
This species was first described by Ferdinand von Mueller as Vitex leichhardtii in 1862, based on material collected near Myall Creek by Ludwig Leichhardt, and near the Clarence River by Dr. Hermann Beckler. In 1870 George Bentham reassigned it to the genus Gmelina in his Flora Australiensis. The genus name honours German botanist Johann Georg Gmelin, while the species name honours Leichhardt, who explored and collected specimens from the country's east and north. White beech was previously classified in the Verbenaceae, but its genus and many others have been transferred into the mint family Lamiaceae. White beech is the standard trade name for the timber, as well as a common name for the species, due to the similarity of the wood to that of European beech, Fagus sylvatica, which is not closely related. Other common names include grey teak.

== Description ==
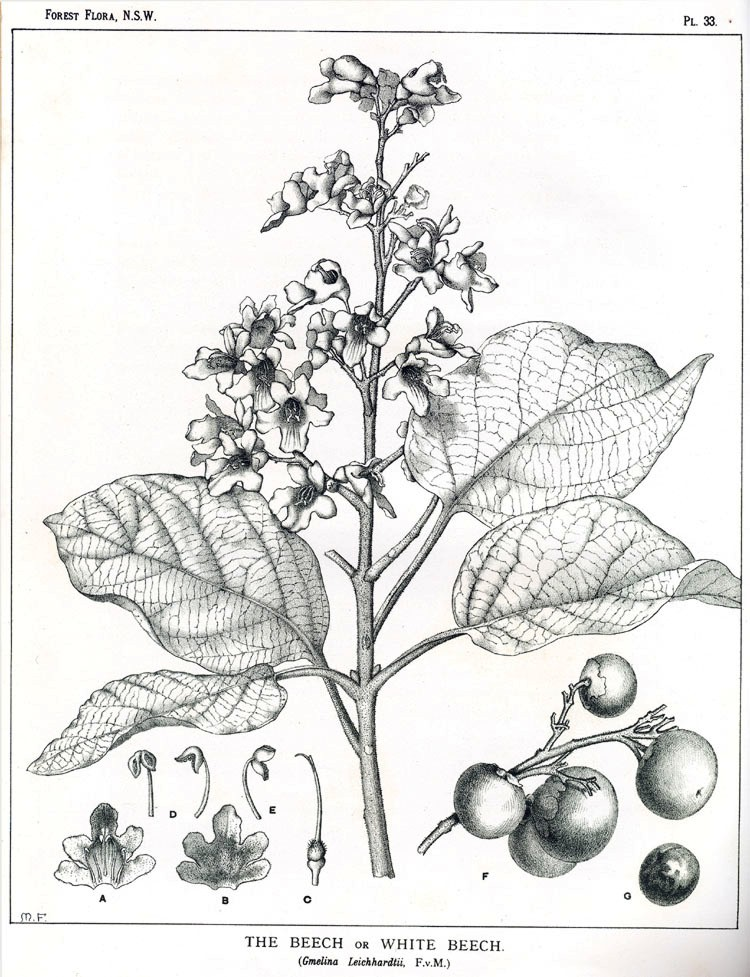
Illustration by Margaret Flockton from The Forest Flora of New South Wales.

Mature specimens of white beech reach 15 to 30 m (49 to 98 ft) tall, though exceptional individuals can reach 60 m (200 ft) tall, and live for centuries. The base of the largest trees exceeds two and a half metres in diameter, and the trunk is cylindrical with a flanged but not buttressed base. The flanging can extend up the bole. The bark varies from light to dark grey and has a scaled surface with vertical cracks marking sections of trunk. There can be burls. Considered by some to be a semi-deciduous species, losing part of the canopy in late spring. Green leaves are almost always found at the base of the tree, assisting with tree identification. Branchlets are thick, grey or brown and hairy, with easily visible leaf scars. The new shoots are densely covered in fine fur.

The mature leaves are pale green and ovate, 8 to 18 cm (3.1 to 7.1 in) long. Hairy and veiny on the underside. Midrib, lateral and net veins distinct on the upper surface, conspicuously raised and distinct beneath due to the covering of fawn hairs. Lateral veins eight to ten, straight and forking near the margin at 45 degrees to the midrib. Juvenile leaves are toothed. Purple, yellow and white flowers form in late spring and summer. The fruit are ripe from February to May.

== Distribution and habitat ==
The main range is from the Blackall Range and the vicinity of Maleny south through to the New South Wales south coast. The locality of Broughtonvale (34½° S), near Berry, New South Wales is considered by Anders Bofeldt as the southern limit of natural distribution. However, D.J. Boland considers the far more southerly Clyde River, New South Wales (35° S) near Batemans Bay to be the southern limit of distribution. There are isolated occurrences in central-northern Queensland in the Eungella Range and on Mt Elliot near Townsville.

North of Sydney, it was officially recorded in the Wyong area in 1916. and is still present in rainforest along Ourimbah Creek.

The White beech had dense populations in Caloundra before European settlement.

White beech is rare and endangered in the Illawarra region. It is likely that fewer than one hundred trees remain in some thirty different sites in the Illawarra. White beech trees in the Illawarra may be seen by the Minnamurra Falls rainforest walk in Budderoo National Park, however, these trees are not signposted.

It is found on mountain slopes as well as alluvial soils along riverbanks. On Fraser Island it is even found on sand hills. The usual habitat is subtropical rainforest, where trees occur singly or in small stands of up to five individuals scattered through the forest, associated with such trees as yellow carabeen (Sloanea woollsii), red carabeen (Geissois benthamiana), Queensland kauri pine (Agathis robusta), golden sassafras (Doryphora sassafras), black booyong (Argyrodendron actinophyllum) and white booyong (A. trifoliolatum), as well as members of the genus Flindersia.

== Ecology ==
The fruit is consumed by the topknot pigeon and wompoo fruit dove.

== Germination ==
Around Easter time, seeds mature within a fleshy bluish or purple drupe 2 to 3 centimetres in diameter. These are eaten by the wompoo fruit dove, paradise riflebird, topknot pigeon and possibly other large fruit eating birds. The fruit contains a hard wooden capsule. The capsule contains four cells, each with a viable or non-viable seed.

The fleshy aril needs to be removed, as it contains agents which inhibit seed germination. Regular watering and drying of the capsules seems to improve germination results. Germination is slow and unreliable, taking between six months and four years. Seedlings usually appear in late spring and summer.

A successful technique for germinating white beech is to collect new purple fruit. Cut off the fleshy aril. Place the wooden "nut" in the sun for a few days. When cracks appear around the emerging seed compartments, place it in a large container. Ensure the capsule receives adequate moisture and warmth in the cooler months. Trying to open the hard nut in the middle of the fruit, or hitting the capsule with a hammer has proven useless. The best technique appears to be the removal of the outer blue/purple flesh. Then exposing the inner capsule to sunlight and moisture. The sunlight cracks the outer covering of the capsule. The moisture seeps through the outer shell, affecting the inner seed. When the seed is germinated, it pushes open the cells of the capsule. The majority of capsules will not produce seedlings. A large quantity of capsules is advised for propagation.

== Timber and uses ==
The timber is durable and greyish without significant markings. However, it splits when nailed. It is prized for templates, pattern making, house construction, planking for boat hulls, flooring, carriage work, wood carving and cabinet work.

It weighs around 550 kg per cubic metre.

This tree is well suited to parks and large gardens. Gmelina leichhardtii is also seen as a shade tree in farms in former rainforest areas.

== Photos ==
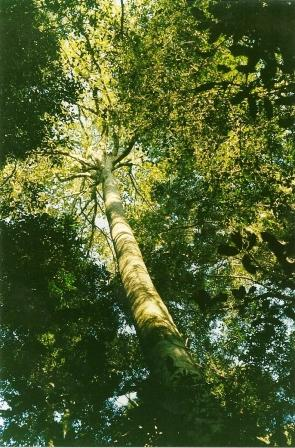
White beech, Lamington National Park, Qld

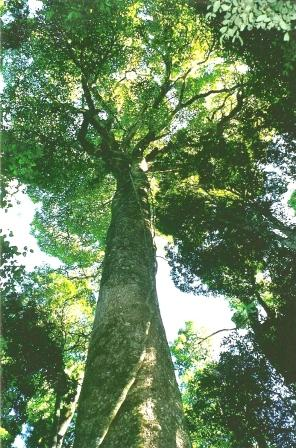
Giant white beech - Tooloom National Park, NSW

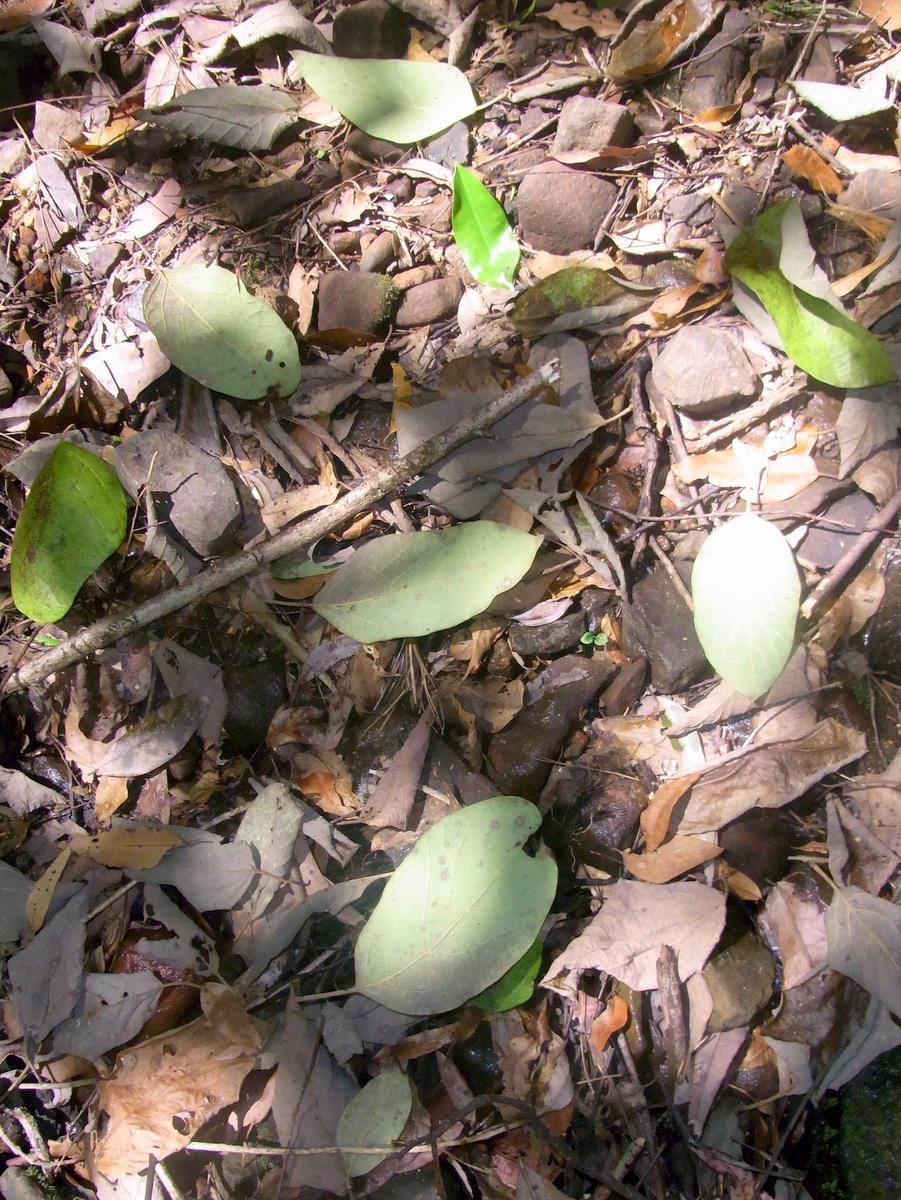
White beech - fallen leaves, near Dungog

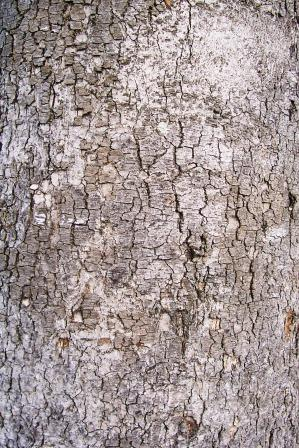
White beech bark - Kurnell

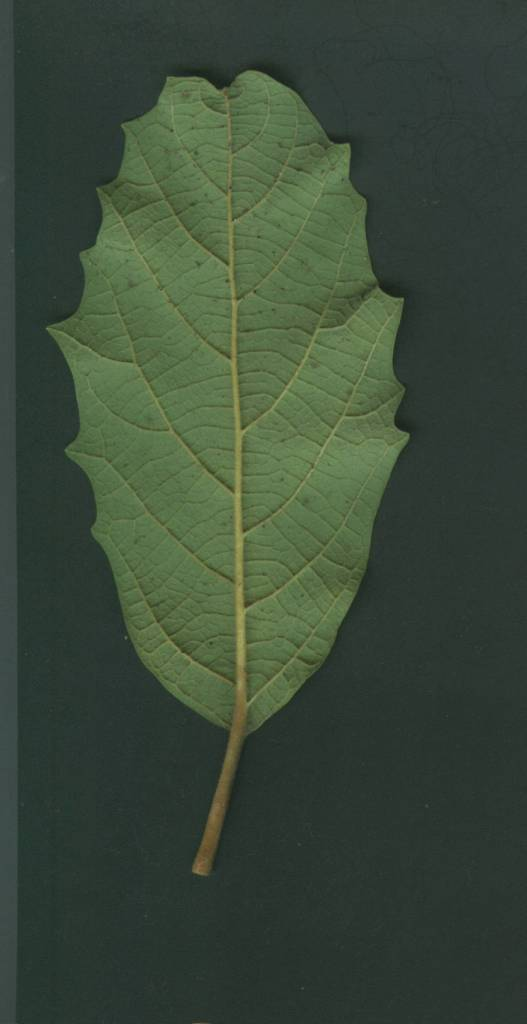
Bottom of juvenile leaf

White beech at Boorganna Nature Reserve

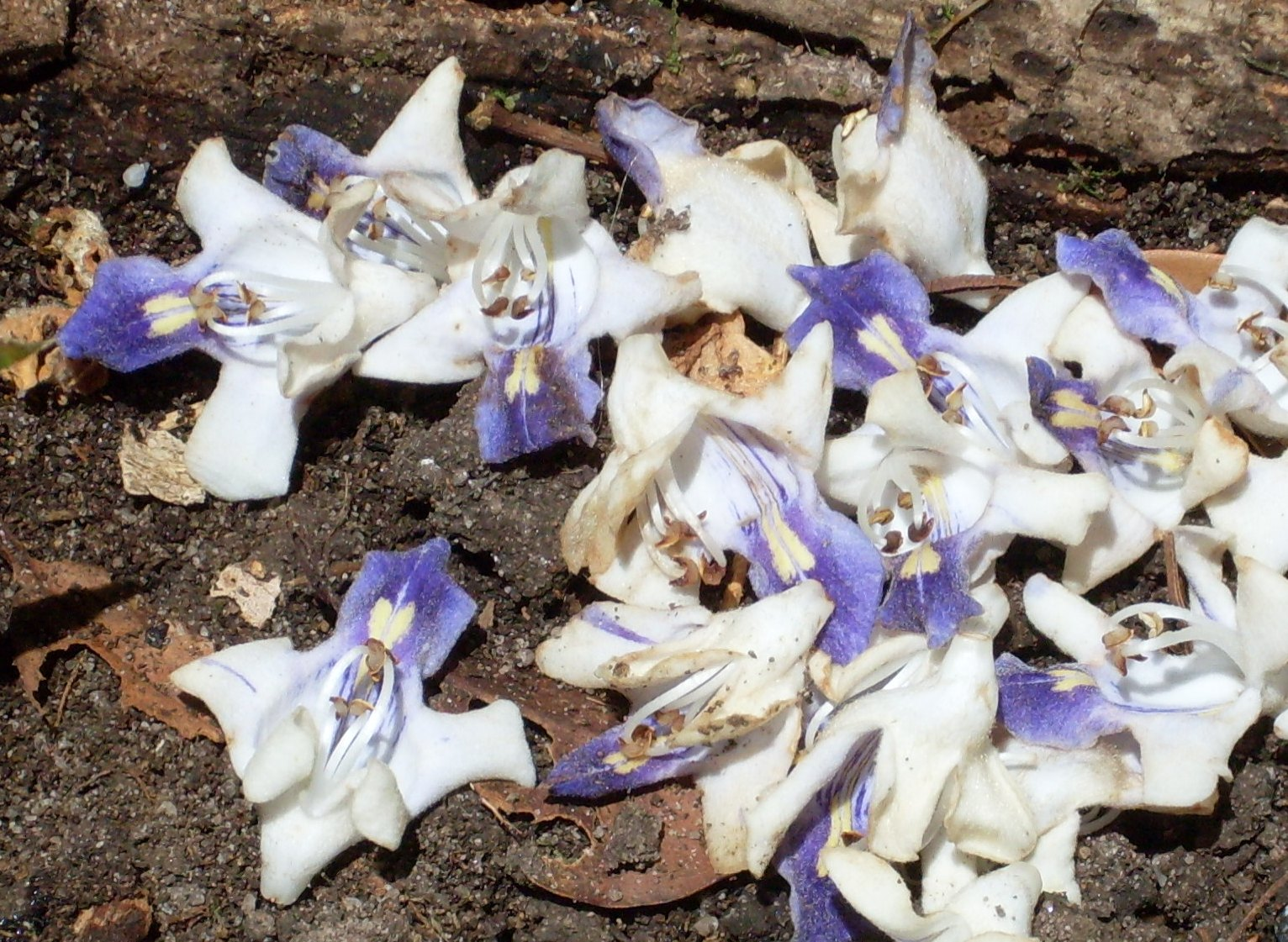
Flowers on the forest floor, Hacking River, Australia

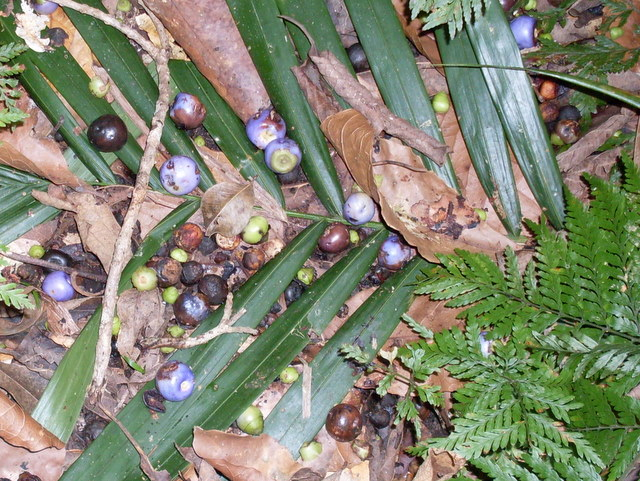
Gmelina leichhardtii fruit and Bangalow palm frond - Hacking River, Australia

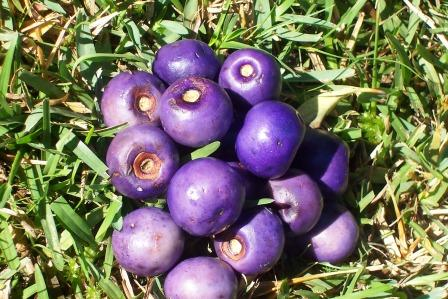
White beech - fruit

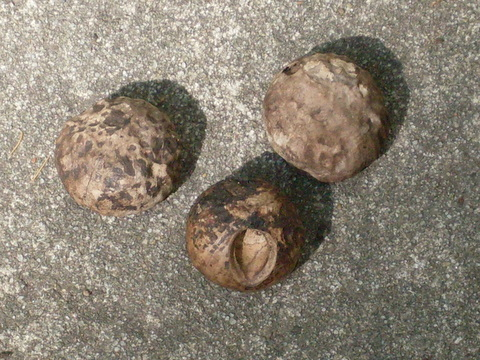
Woody capsules, showing a gap from where a seed germinated

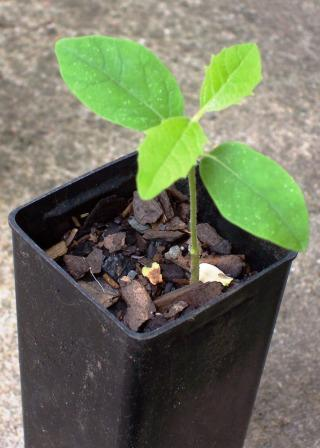
White beech seedling

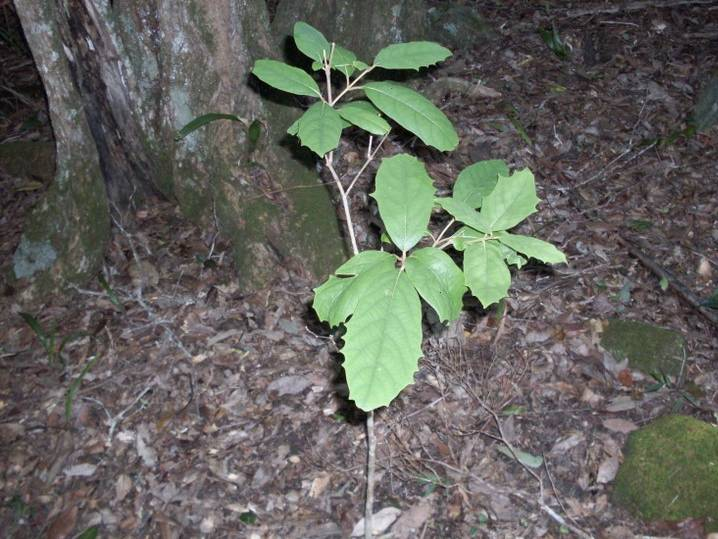
White beech juvenile, Hacking River, Australia

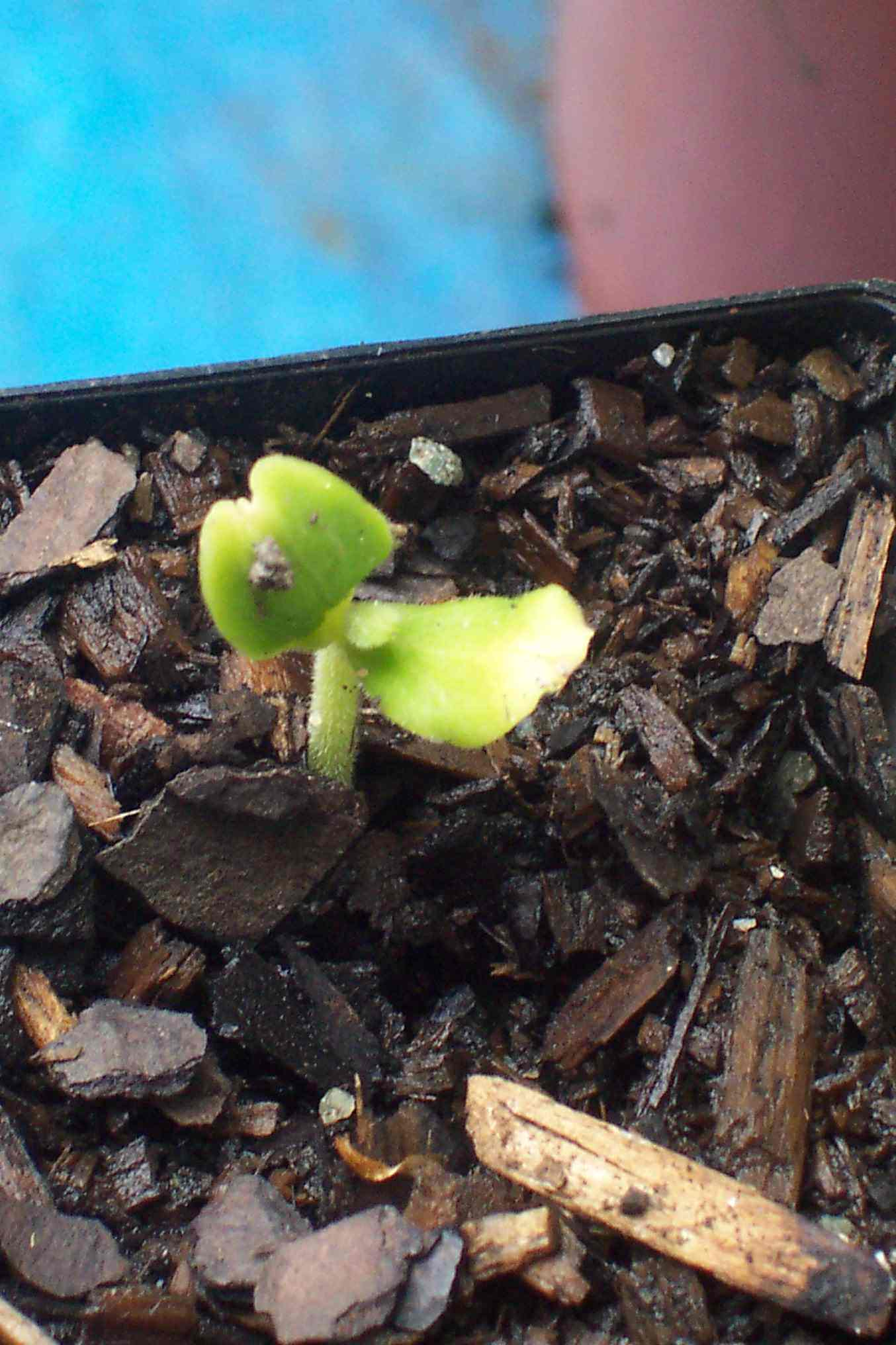
White beech germinating

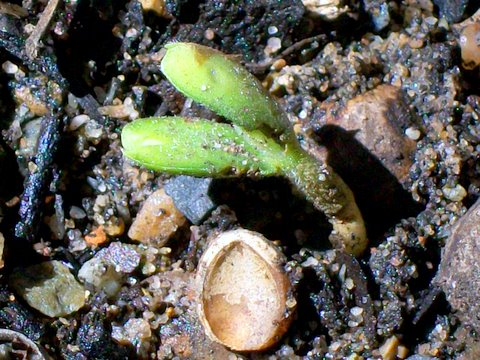
White beech germinating in the first week of September. Note the discarded oval part of the capsule, pushed out by the shoot. Coorabakh National Park
