= Bungabbee State Forest =

Forest in New South Wales, Australia

Bungabbee State Forest is a 955 hectare state forest about 15 kilometres north east of Casino in New South Wales. Bungabbee Nature reserve is a 169 hectare section in the middle north of the state forest that was protected in 1999.

The forest was scheduled in 2019 for logging in 2021, but this was delayed or stopped following community reaction, including concern about protecting greater glider habitat.
