= Andrew Johnston Big Scrub Nature Reserve =

Protected area in New South Wales, Australia

- IUCN category IV (habitat/species management area)
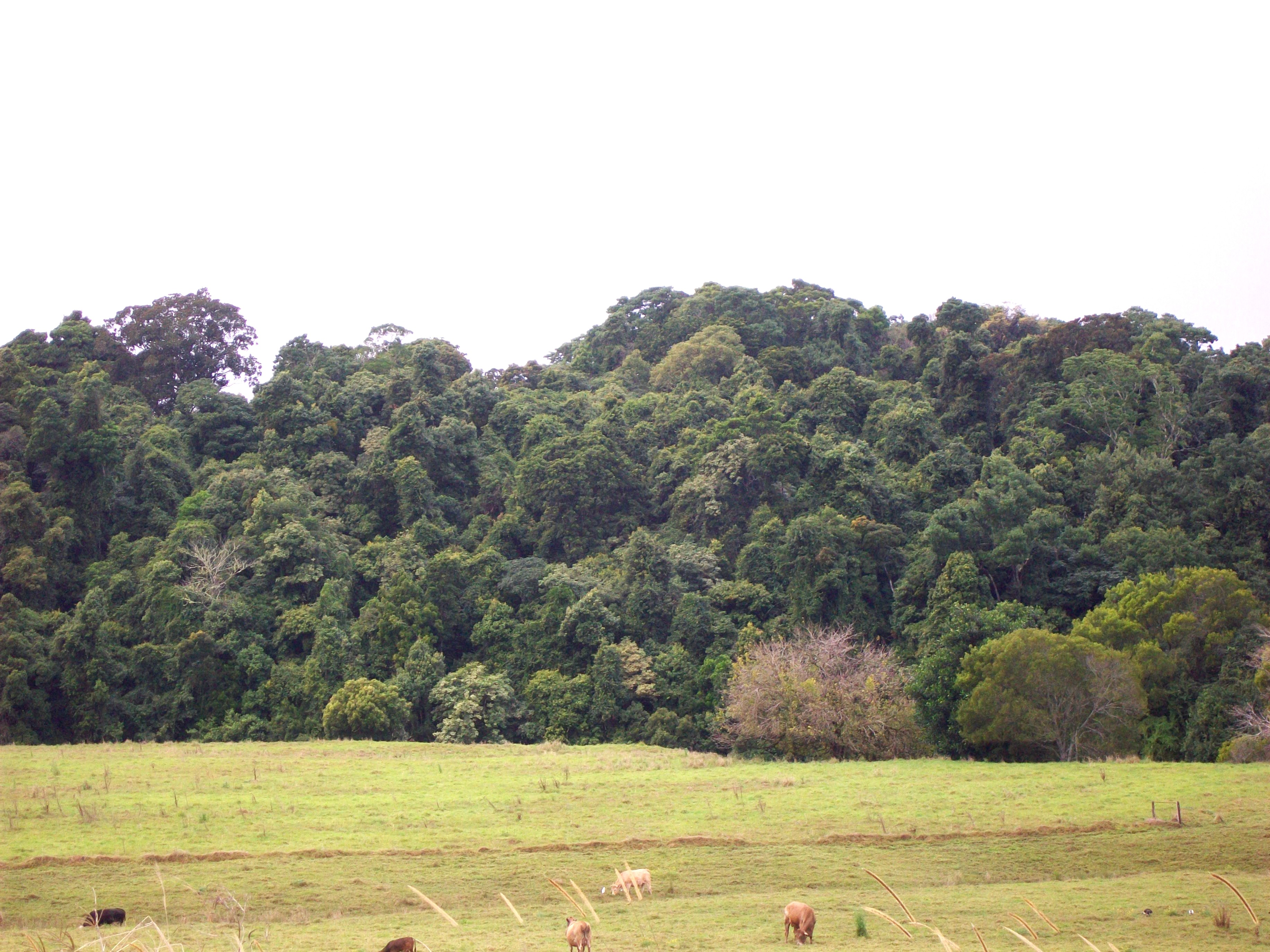

- Location within New South Wales
- Location: New South Wales
- Nearest city: Lismore
- Coordinates: 28°41′50″S 153°25′24″E
- Area: 0.21 km^{2} (0.081 sq mi)
- Established: March 1993
- Governing body: NSW National Parks & Wildlife Service
- Website: http://www.environment.nsw.gov.au/NationalParks/parkHome.aspx?id=N0703

The Andrew Johnston Big Scrub Nature Reserve is a protected nature reserve in the Northern Rivers region of New South Wales, Australia. A subtropical jungle remnant of the Big Scrub, the 21-hectare (52-acre) reserve is approximately 19 kilometres (12 mi) northeast of Lismore. Far less than 1% of the original Big Scrub now remains.

== Features ==
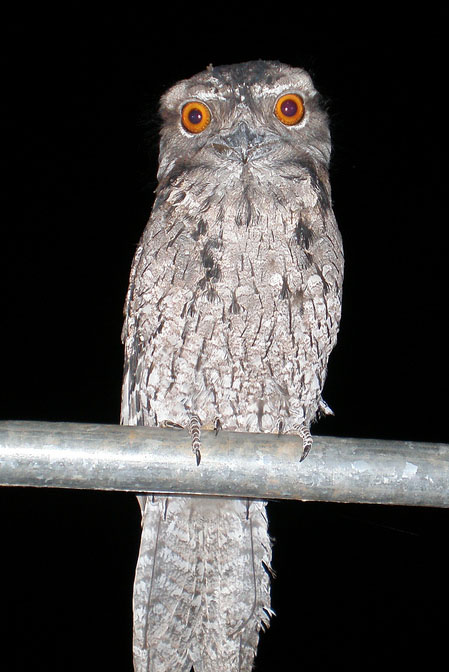
Marbled frogmouth

The Reserve's red-brown soil is derived from a basaltic flow from the nearby Mount Warning, and later volcanic flows from the Nightcap Range. Average annual rainfall at Lismore is 1,340 millimetres (53 in).

The Reserve is the largest and most important of the remnants of the Big Scrub. The area previously known as "Big Scrub Flora Reserve" is larger; however, it is not considered part of the genuine Big Scrub further to the south.

Over 170 species of trees, shrubs and vines have been recorded at this reserve.

Significant rainforest tree species include white booyong, rosewood, long jack, red bean, koda, cudgerie, white cedar and black bean.

As at most of the Big Scrub remnants, large Moreton Bay figs are prominent at this reserve. It is also a habitat for the seldom seen marbled frogmouth.

== See also ==
- Big Scrub
- Booyong Flora Reserve
- Protected areas of New South Wales
