= Alstonville, New South Wales =

Town in New South Wales, Australia

Alstonville
- Town
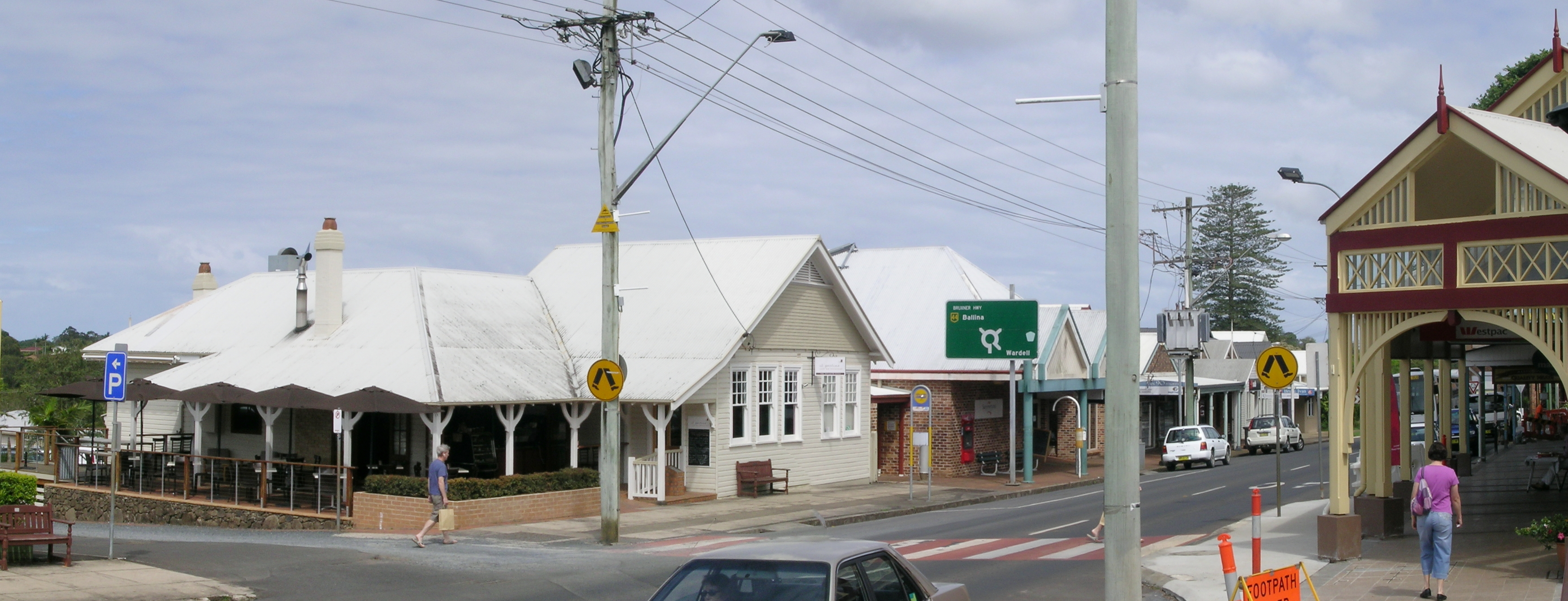
- Main Street

- Coordinates: 28°51′S 153°26′E
- Country: Australia
- State: New South Wales
- LGA: Ballina Shire
- Location: 732 km (455 mi) NNE of Sydney; 193 km (120 mi) S of Brisbane; 19 km (12 mi) E of Lismore; 13 km (8.1 mi) W of Ballina

Government
  - State electorate: Ballina
  - Federal division: Page
- Elevation: 140 m (460 ft)

Population
  - Total: 5,182 (2021 census)
- Time zone: UTC+10 (AEST)
  - Summer (DST): UTC+11 (AEDT)
- Postcode: 2477
- Mean max temp: 23.4 °C (74.1 °F)
- Mean min temp: 15.0 °C (59.0 °F)
- Annual rainfall: 1,822.3 mm (71.74 in)

Alstonville is a town in northern New South Wales, Australia, part of the region known as the Northern Rivers. Alstonville is on the Bruxner Highway between the town of Ballina (13 km to the east) and city of Lismore (19 km to the west). The village of Wollongbar is 4 km to the west of Alstonville. Alstonville is the service centre of the area known as the Alstonville Plateau.

The traditional owners of this area are the Bundjalung people.

== Origin of place name ==
The village was originally known as Duck Creek Mountain after the nearby Duck Creek, which flows along the southern edge of town before merging with Emigrant Creek and the Richmond River. This name was given by the cedar cutters because of the abundance of wild duck on the upper tidal reaches of the creek.

In 1873, due to the conflict of the original name with a different Duck Creek, the first postmaster and local wealthy landowner John Perry proposed the name Alstonville. This was also the name of the Perry farm, was derived from Alston the maiden name of his wife Annie Alston.

== History ==
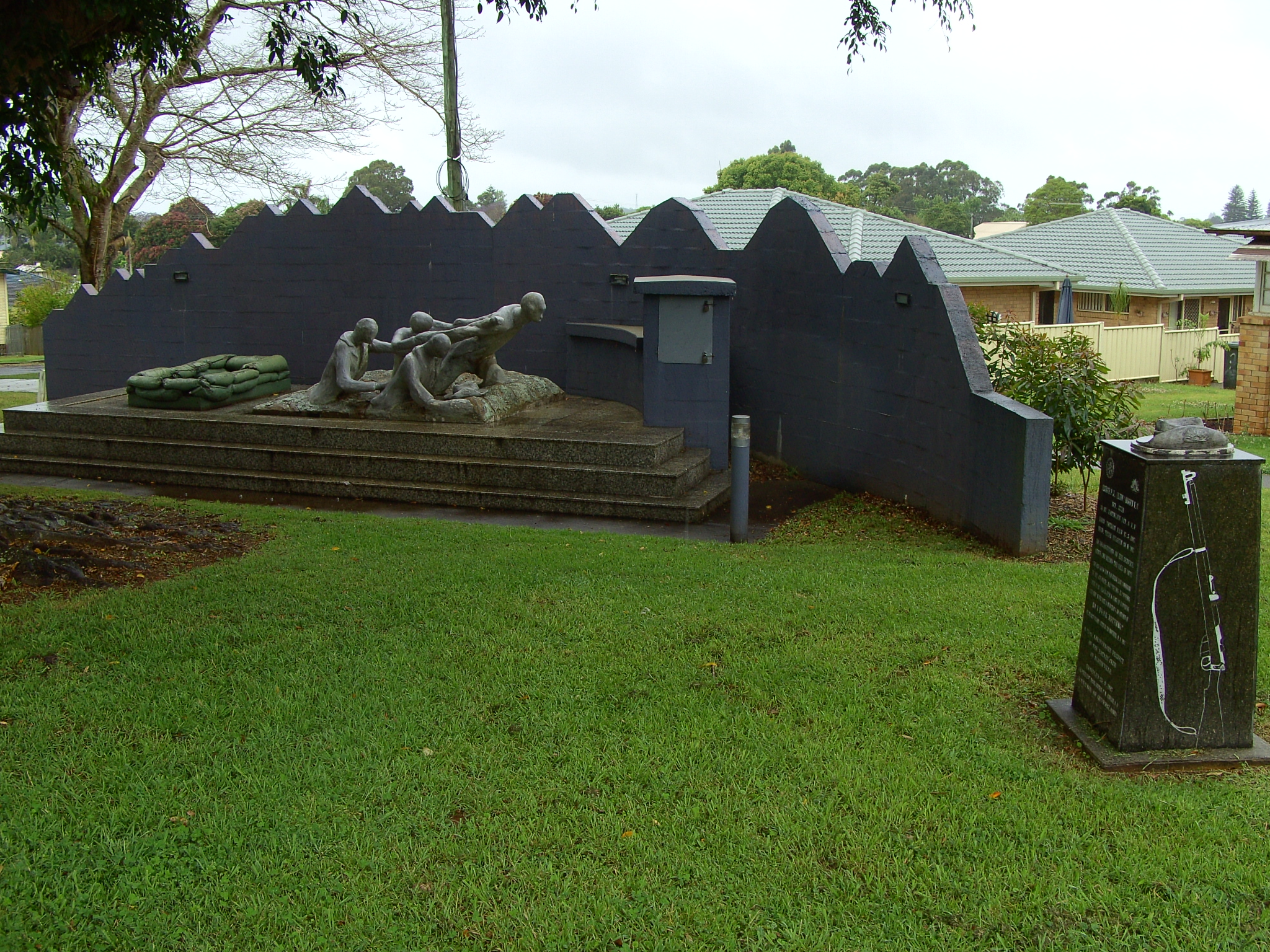
Memorial to Private Paddy Bugden

Europeans were first attracted to the area, known as the Big Scrub, in the 1840s by the plentiful supply of red cedar. It was not until 1865 that the first settlers selected land in the area, then known as the parish of Tuckombil. Some notable selections in the first five years include that of the Freeborn, Roberston, Graham, Newborn, Crawford, Mellis, and Newton families. By 1883 Alstonville boasted two pubs, six stores, two black-smiths, nine sugar mills, and four saw mills.

Sugar cane was an important industry to the early settlers, with many small mills operating across the district. These were later replaced by larger more efficient steam mills such as those erected in 1882 at Alstonville (owned by the Melbourne Sugar Company) adjacent to Maguires Creek and at Rous Mill adjacent to Youngman Creek. By 1896 the Rous mill boasted a light rail line to transport cane from Alstonville. From the 1890s ownward, dairies became common across the area, later becoming the dominant industry for the first half of the 20th century. Due to lack of refrigeration, cream, not milk, was the product of interest, which was transported to local factories to be made into butter. The first butter factories were located at Wollongbah (1889), Rous (1889) and Teven Road (1890). In 1900 the NSW Creamery Butter Company built the Alstonville factory near Maguires Creek, which was sometime later acquired by the Norco Co-operative. After closing this building became a caravan factory, peanut factory, and finally a furniture factory, which is still open today.

One notable former resident of Alstonville is Patrick Joseph Bugden, who was awarded a Victoria Cross (the highest military decoration which can be awarded to a member of the armed forces of the Commonwealth). "Paddy" served as a member of the 31st Battalion AIF during the First World War. The annual Anzac day parade starts at the Paddy Bugden Memorial, which is situated on Bugden Avenue.

== Climate ==
Alstonville has a wet humid subtropical climate (Köppen: Cfa). It experiences moderately hot, rainy summers and mild, somewhat drier winters.

Climate data for Alstonville (28.85°S 153.46°E, 140 m (460 ft) m AMSL) (1963-2011 data)
Month	Jan	Feb	Mar	Apr	May	Jun	Jul	Aug	Sep	Oct	Nov	Dec	Year
Record high °C (°F)	41.7 (107.1)	39.7 (103.5)	36.0 (96.8)	34.8 (94.6)	30.1 (86.2)	27.5 (81.5)	27.2 (81.0)	34.7 (94.5)	34.5 (94.1)	37.2 (99.0)	40.7 (105.3)	38.6 (101.5)	41.7 (107.1)
Mean daily maximum °C (°F)	27.2 (81.0)	26.7 (80.1)	25.9 (78.6)	23.9 (75.0)	21.2 (70.2)	19.0 (66.2)	18.6 (65.5)	20.0 (68.0)	22.4 (72.3)	24.1 (75.4)	25.4 (77.7)	26.8 (80.2)	23.4 (74.2)
Mean daily minimum °C (°F)	19.5 (67.1)	19.4 (66.9)	18.3 (64.9)	15.9 (60.6)	13.3 (55.9)	10.9 (51.6)	9.9 (49.8)	10.6 (51.1)	12.8 (55.0)	14.8 (58.6)	16.6 (61.9)	18.5 (65.3)	15.0 (59.1)
Record low °C (°F)	13.8 (56.8)	13.0 (55.4)	10.7 (51.3)	8.3 (46.9)	4.2 (39.6)	2.7 (36.9)	2.9 (37.2)	4.0 (39.2)	4.2 (39.6)	7.0 (44.6)	8.8 (47.8)	11.7 (53.1)	2.7 (36.9)
Average precipitation mm (inches)	177.8 (7.00)	224.9 (8.85)	260.6 (10.26)	196.7 (7.74)	182.4 (7.18)	164.6 (6.48)	92.5 (3.64)	74.8 (2.94)	55.6 (2.19)	109.2 (4.30)	132.7 (5.22)	153.3 (6.04)	1,822.3 (71.74)
Average precipitation days (≥ 1.0 mm)	11.9	13.1	14.0	12.3	11.4	9.4	7.2	6.5	5.9	8.3	10.9	10.7	121.6
Mean monthly sunshine hours	229.4	194.9	207.7	198.0	189.1	183.0	213.9	238.7	243.0	241.8	228.0	232.5	2,600
Percentage possible sunshine	54	53	55	58	57	59	66	69	68	61	56	54	59
Source: Bureau of Meteorology (1966-2012 data)

== Population ==
Historical population
Year	Pop.	±%
1966	576	—
1971	779	+35.2%
1976	1,457	+87.0%
1981	2,936	+101.5%
1986	3,266	+11.2%
1991	3,678	+12.6%
1996	4,725	+28.5%
2001	4,751	+0.6%
2006	5,006	+5.4%
2011	4,990	−0.3%
2016	5,066	+1.5%
2021	5,182	+2.3%
Source: Australian Bureau of Statistics data.

In the 2021 Census, there were 5,182 people in the Alstonville urban centre. 84.3% of people were born in Australia. The next most common country of birth was England at 4.2%. 92.1% of people only spoke English at home. The most common responses for religion were no religion 39.9%, Catholic 18.7% and Anglican 14.9%.

== Facilities ==
Crawford house, a pioneer house situated next to Elizabeth Ann Brown park is now a historical museum. Directly behind is the town's major shopping centre, Alstonville Plaza, which has a few specialty shops, and a major supermarket. The town has a post office but no longer has any bank.

Summerland Farm, previously known as the "Summerland House With No Steps", has been operating near Alstonville since 1971. A business of Aruma, formerly House with No Steps, Summerland Farm provides training and employment for in excess of 100 people with a disability in fields such as farming and hospitality. A must see tourist attraction, major distribution hub for regional farms and a working avocado and macadamia farm, Summerland Farm is one of the region's oldest and most successful tourism and horticulture businesses.

Alstonville has two stationed emergency services, Fire & Rescue NSW Station 204 and NSW Police.

== Economy ==
An industrial estate is located in Russleton Park, with cement, macadamia processing and rural supplies dominating. In addition, numerous bus depots are located here, and there is a mail sorting facility. The industrial estate is located across the highway from Wollongbar; however, it is not a part of Wollongbar.

Alstonville is also home to many locally-run shops and services.

== Schools ==
The town of Alstonville is home to two public and one private school: Alstonville Public School (state primary), St Joseph's School (Catholic primary) and Alstonville High School (state secondary). In 2016 the newly built Alstonville Preschool was opened, situated next to the Olympic Swimming Pool.

== Transport ==
Transport between Alstonville and Wollongbar, is by either car, or foot/bike, as a path runs between Bulwinkel Park and the shopping centre at Wollongbar.

There is a regular bus service operating between Ballina and Lismore which passes through Alstonville.

Air travel is served by Ballina Byron Gateway Airport, which is located 17 km (11 mi) east of the town.

=== Transport issues ===
A bypass has been constructed for the Bruxner Highway to remove congestion and improve safety. Previously Alstonville traffic became unusually congested (for such a small-population town) because its main road was the main thoroughfare between Lismore and Ballina. All three schools (and bus stops for another three schools) are located in a bottleneck with only one entry/exit road; as a result, parking for all three schools is usually congested.

== Sporting teams on the plateau ==
The area has many parks, including Geoff Watt Oval, the major sporting ground for cricket, and soccer, and Crawford Park, across the other side of the highway. This park is a second sporting ground for soccer.

- The Alstonville and District Football Club is the local soccer club, known as "Villa", and is uniformed with red and black.
- Wollongbar Alstonville Pioneers Rugby is the local rugby union club, located at Wollongbar.
- Alstonville & District Cricket Club is Alstonville's only cricket team. Each year they have a team in the LJ Hooker League. They play at Geoff Watt Oval, Hill Park Oval & Gap Road.
- Alstonville is also the home of FNC NSW futsal at the Alstonville Entertainment Centre.

== Nearby localities of interest ==
Tosha Falls

Maguires Creek flows along the northern boundary of Alstonville, passing at one point over Tosha Falls (historically also known as Cascade Falls, Grays Falls or Elliotts Falls), a local attraction and popular swimming hole—compromised only slightly by its location adjacent to the Alstonville Sewerage Treatment Plant—which can be accessed by a walking track from Johnstons Road. The area around the Falls was previously cleared for agriculture but now primarily comprises secondary regrowth rainforest along with exotics such as Camphor laurel and large leaved privet. Prior to clearing, all of the area would once have been a portion of the Big Scrub rainforest, which was largely cleared first for timber, then dairying in the 19th century. The name presently attached to the Falls appears to be related to a previous property name, Tosha Farm for the neighbouring property presently named Cascade Farm, and be named after a successful racehorse "Tosha" that belonged to a previous owner. 9 km to the south of Alstonville, Victoria Park Nature Reserve preserves 8 ha (20 acres) of original Big Scrub rainforest, within a larger area that is being systematically regenerated.

Alstonville lends its name to the Alstonville Plateau, an elevated (c. 150 m above AHD) geomorphological area which consists of a series of rolling hills composed mainly of tertiary basalt. Featuring deep red volcanic soil and reliable rainfall, the region supports extensive and valuable plantations of subtropical agricultural crops including avocado, macadamia, lychee, custard apple, guava and more, although the market for the latter has been declining, with several guava orchards pulled out and replaced by the more profitable macadamias.

== Interesting facts ==
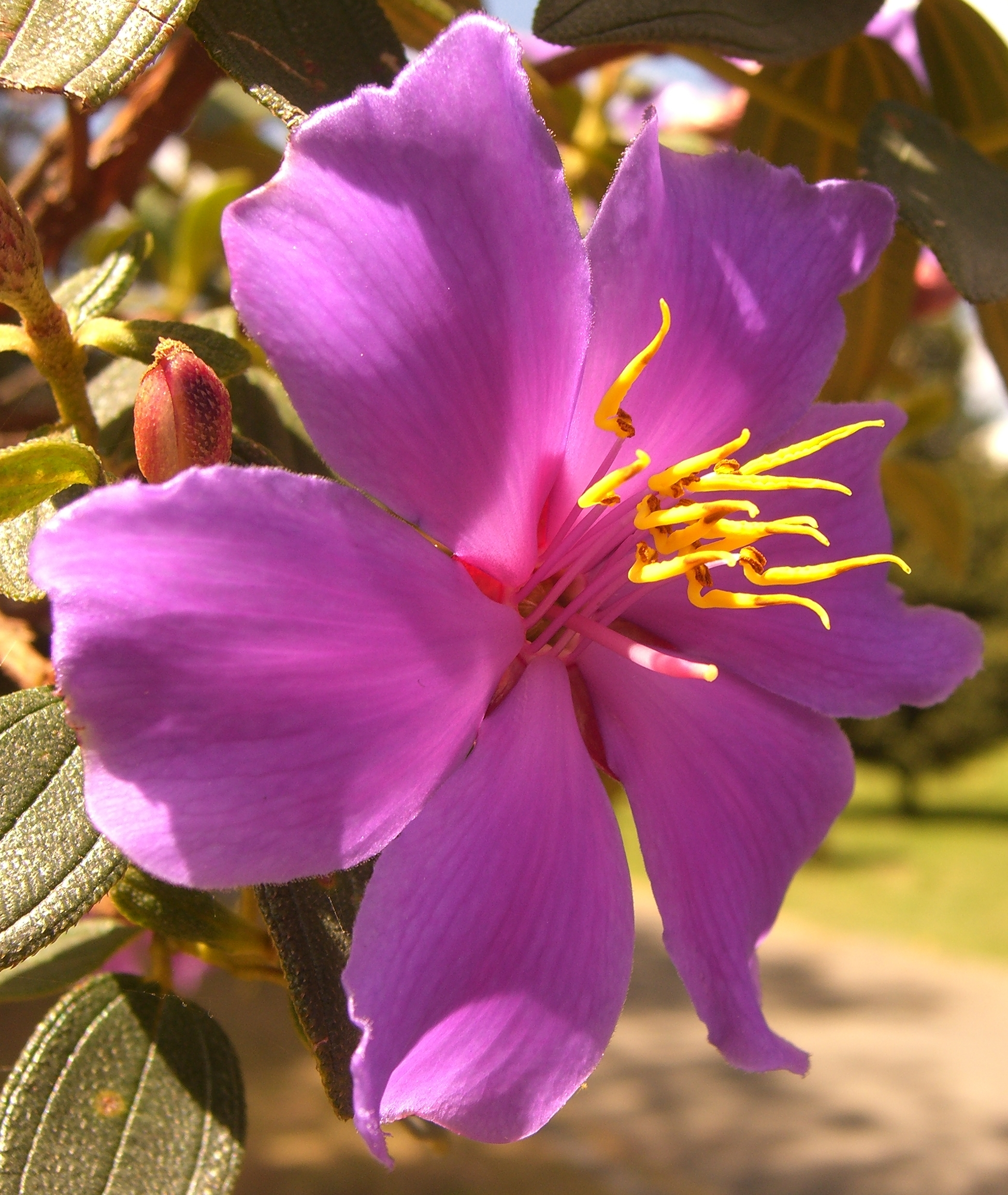
Flower of Andesanthus lepidotus (syn. Tibouchina lepidota)

Andesanthus lepidotus 'Alstonville' is a small tree grown in many parts of Australia for its brilliant display of purple flowers in autumn. This variety along with the dwarf variety 'Jules' was developed by Ken Dunstan a resident of Alstonville, hence the name.

The world's first commercial orchard of macadamia trees was planted in the early 1880s by Charles Staff at Rous Mill, on the Alstonville plateau, 7 km south west of the centre of town.

== Media ==
Radio stations that cover Alstonville are ABC North Coast, 101.9 Paradise FM, River FM and Triple Z FM.

Alstonville receives TV from SBS and ABC and the regional affiliates of Seven, Nine and WIN Television’s 10 Northern NSW.

The local newspaper is The Northern Star.

== Notable residents ==
- Rachael Beck, actress
- Doug Daley, rugby league player and administrator
- Nicholas Hamilton, actor
- Russell Strong, surgeon
- Brendan Drew, cricketer
- Alethea Jones, director/producer
- Harley Cameron, wrestler/sports entertainer
