= Wilsons Peak Flora Reserve =

Protected area in New South Wales, Australia

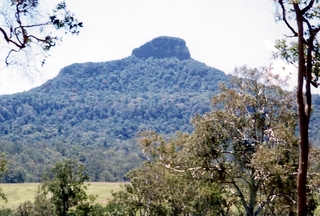
- Wilsons Peak, located within the reserve

- Location within New South Wales
- Location: New South Wales
- Nearest city: Killarney, Queensland
- Coordinates: 28°15′19″S 152°29′21″E
- Governing body: NSW National Parks and Wildlife Service

The Wilsons Peak Flora Reserve is a protected nature reserve in the Northern Rivers region in the state of New South Wales, in eastern Australia. The reserve is bounded to the north by the border between New South Wales and the state of Queensland. The nearest town is Killarney in Queensland.

The dry rainforest is part of the Main Range group of the UNESCO World Heritage–listed Gondwana Rainforests of Australia. Significant plants in the area include hoop pine, cliff malletwood, Grevillea robusta and Muellerina myrtifolia.

The summit of Wilsons Peak is 1,231 metres (4,039 ft) above sea level.

== See also ==
- Protected areas of New South Wales
