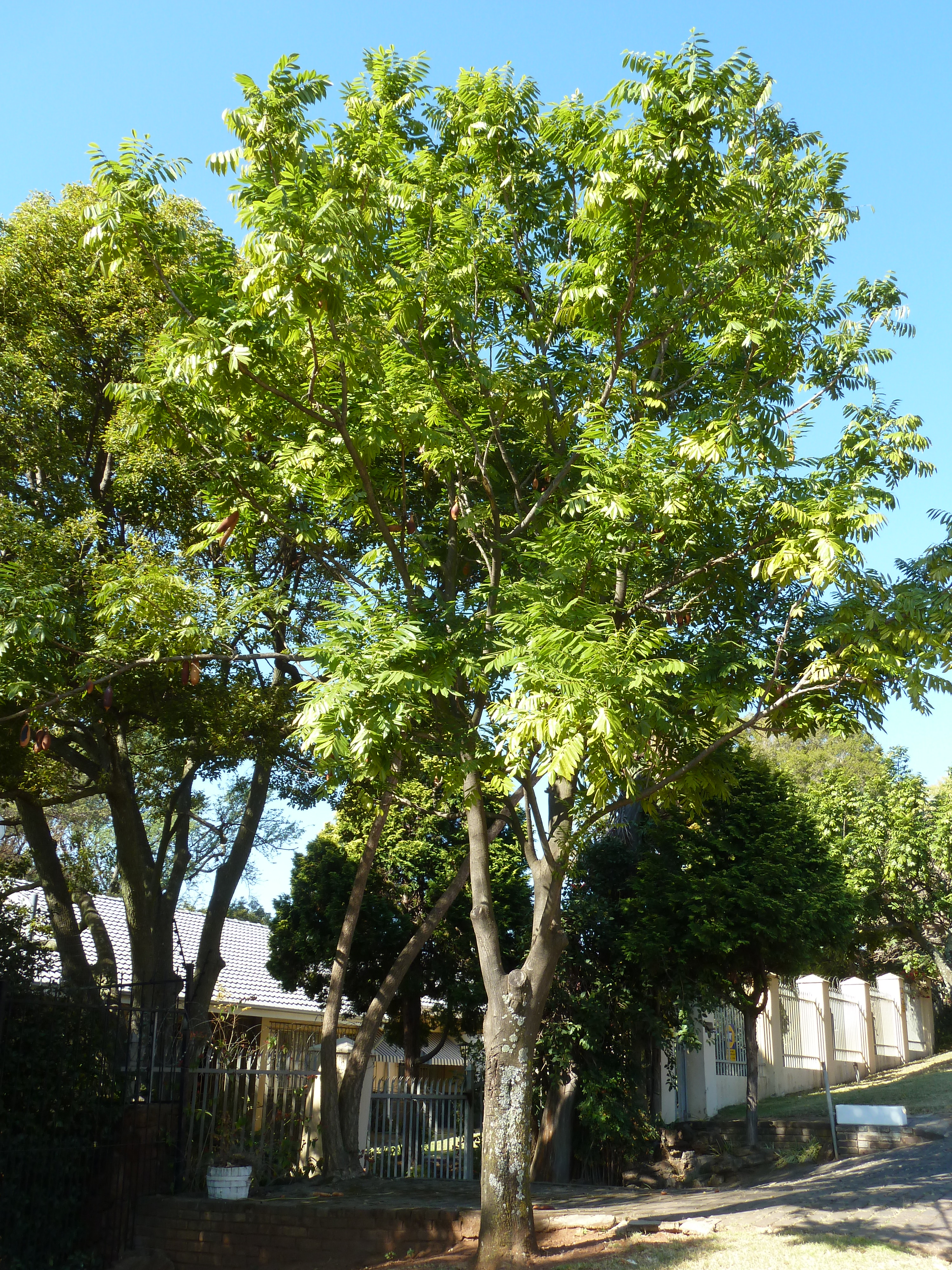
- Street tree in Pretoria

Conservation status
- Least Concern (NCA)

Scientific classification
- Kingdom: Plantae
- Clade: Tracheophytes
- Clade: Angiosperms
- Clade: Eudicots
- Clade: Rosids
- Order: Fabales
- Family: Fabaceae
- Subfamily: Faboideae
- Tribe: Angylocalyceae
- Genus: Castanospermum; A.Cunn ex Mudie (1829)
- Species: C. australe

Binomial name
- Castanospermum australe A.Cunn ex Mudie (1829)

Synonyms
- Genus: Castanocarpus Sweet (1830); Vieillardia Montrouz. (1860); Species: Castanocarpus australis (A.Cunn. ex Mudie) Sweet (1830); Castanospermum australe var. brevivexillum F.M.Bailey (1897); Castanospermum brevivexillum (F.M.Bailey) Domin (1912); Castanospermum cunninghamii J.M.Wood (1903); Vieillardia grandiflora Montrouz. (1860)

= Castanospermum =

Moreton Bay chestnut

Genus of legumes

Castanospermum is a monotypic genus (i.e. a genus that contains only one species) in the legume family Fabaceae. The sole species is Castanospermum australe, commonly known as Moreton Bay chestnut or black bean. It is native to rainforests on the east coast of Australia (Queensland and northeastern New South Wales), and to nearby islands of the southwest Pacific Ocean. It was first described in 1829, and has been cultivated around the world.

== Description ==
The black bean is a large evergreen tree growing up to 40 m (130 ft) tall, though commonly much smaller. The leaves are 15 cm (5.9 in) long and 6–7 cm (2.4–2.8 in) broad, pinnate, with 11-15 leaflets. The flowers are bicoloured red and yellow, 3–4 cm (1.2–1.6 in) long, produced in racemes 6 cm (2.4 in) long. The fruit is a cylindrical pod 12–20 cm (4.7–7.9 in) long and 4–6 cm (1.6–2.4 in) diameter, the interior divided by a spongy substance into one to five cells, each of which contains a large chestnut-like seed.

== Taxonomy ==
This species was first described in 1829 by English botanist Allan Cunningham, in a publication by Scottish naturalist Robert Mudie titled The Picture of Australia.

=== Etymology ===
The genus name Castanospermum is derived from the Latin castanea 'chestnut', and Ancient Greek spérma 'seed', and is a reference to the similarity of the black bean seeds to chestnuts. The species epithet australe is from the Latin australis, meaning 'southern'.

=== Common names ===
The 1889 book The Useful Native Plants of Australia records the common names of Castanospermum australe as "Moreton Bay Chestnut" and "Bean tree" and notes that it was called "Irtalie" by Aboriginal people of the Richmond and Clarence Rivers (New South Wales) and "Bogum" by "others of Northern New South Wales". Other names that have been used by Aboriginal peoples are: baway (Yalanji), yiwurra (Djabugay), junggurraa (Yidiny), mirrayn (Dyirbal), ganyjuu (Ngadjon), and binyjaalga (Gumbaynggirr). Pedley 1992 pg 5, states ‘ganyjuu’ as a ‘ major source of food for the ngadjon’

== Distribution and habitat ==
This species is native to eastern Australia and the islands of Vanuatu and New Caledonia, where it grows in rainforest and gallery forest, particularly along water courses. In Australia it occurs from about Kutini-Payamu National Park (formerly Iron Range National Park), south to about Coffs Harbour, at altitudes from sea level to about 800 m (2,600 ft).

The plant has been introduced to many places including India, Malaysia, Papua New Guinea, Sri Lanka, South Africa and the United States.

=== Seed dispersal ===
The seeds of C. australe are large and toxic to most animals, thus are unlikely to be dispersed by them. However the seeds float and can be dispersed by water, and they retain their viability even after immersion in salt water, and this is reflected in their distribution along coastlines and waterways.

Due to its significance as a food for Aboriginal people, black bean trees were spread by hand into mountain areas on the east coast of Australia. All the trees in New South Wales are descended from a single seed.

== Uses ==
=== Chemicals ===
In 1981, castanospermine was isolated from the seeds. Members of this and closely related genera accumulate iminosugars in their leaves.

=== Cultural significance ===
Due to its importance as a food, the blackbean tree was a seasonal gathering point for Aboriginal peoples, and this acted as a catalyst for ceremonies. Songlines featuring the black bean seeds have been collected. The bark fibre has been used for fish and animal traps, nets and baskets, and the empty seed pods have been used as toy boats. Additionally, the tree has been used as a seasonal signal for when to hunt jungle fowl.

=== Food ===
The unprocessed seeds are poisonous since they contain toxic saponins, and can cause vomiting and diarrhoea, but they become edible when carefully prepared by roasting, cutting up into small pieces, leaching with running water for several days, and pounding into flour and roasting it as a damper. The seeds have been prepared and eaten for at least 2,500 years. The 1889 book The Useful Native Plants of Australia notes and describes this use of the beans. As of 2012, the food was not used in modern bush tucker, and there was no nutritional information available on the seeds.

=== Ornamental use ===
The trees are popular as potted plants in Asia, Europe and America, and have been widely cultivated both in Australia and other countries as shade trees for parks.

=== Wood ===
The wood was used by Aboriginal people for spear-throwers. The timber, which somewhat resembles walnut, is soft, fine-grained, and takes a good polish, and the wood has a durability rating above-ground of over 40 years longevity.

== Gallery ==
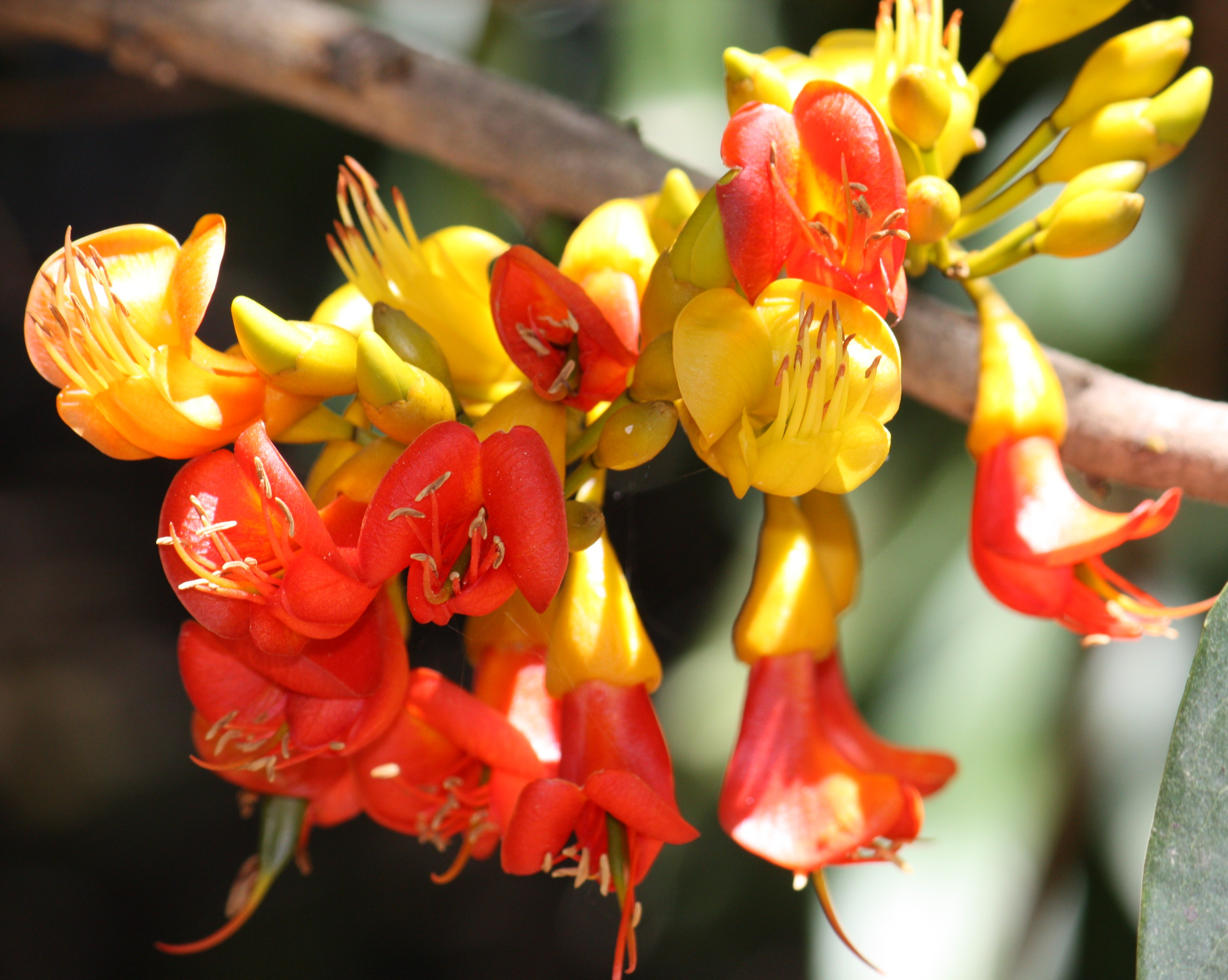
Castanospermum australe flower

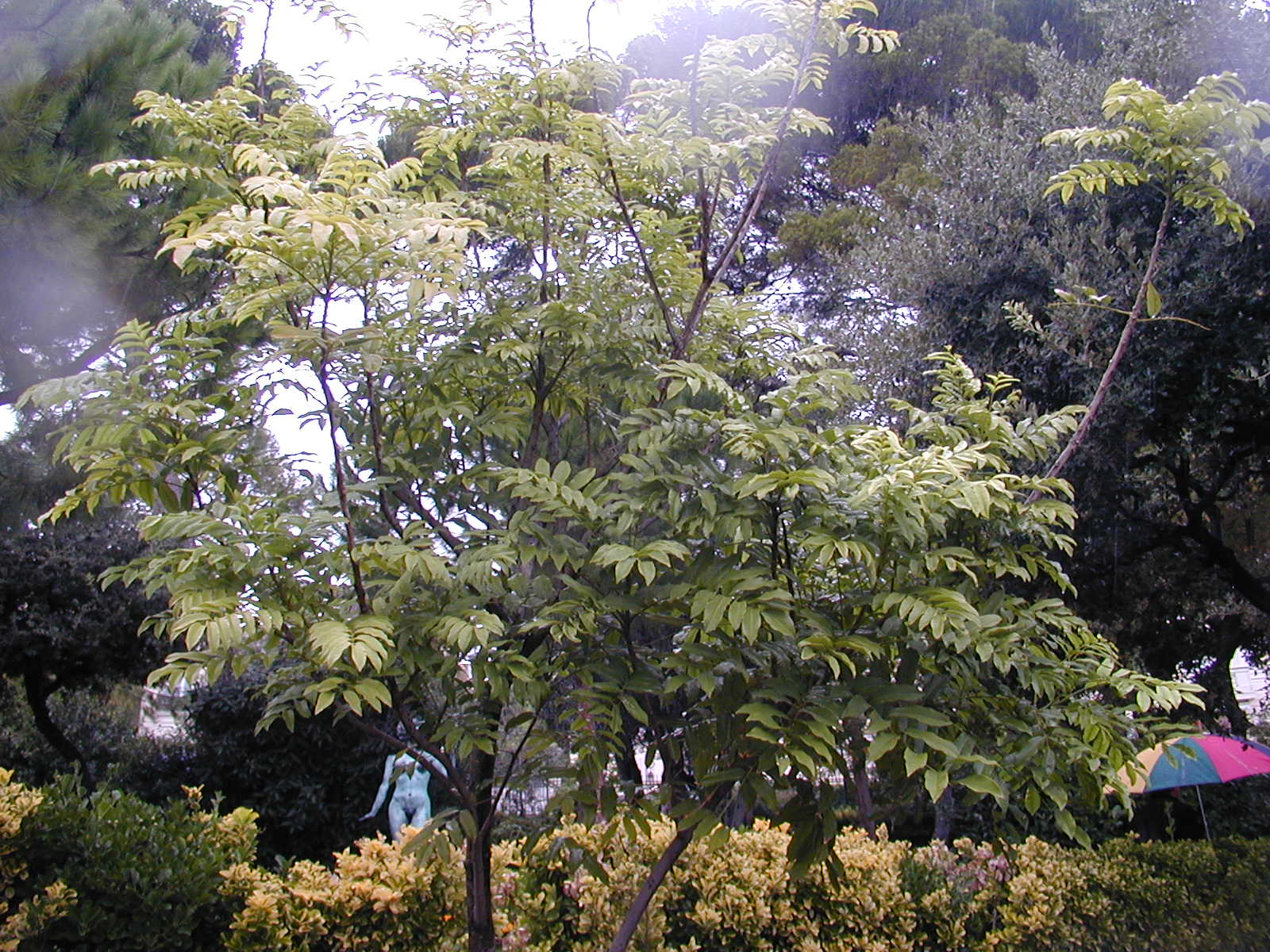
Small C. australe tree

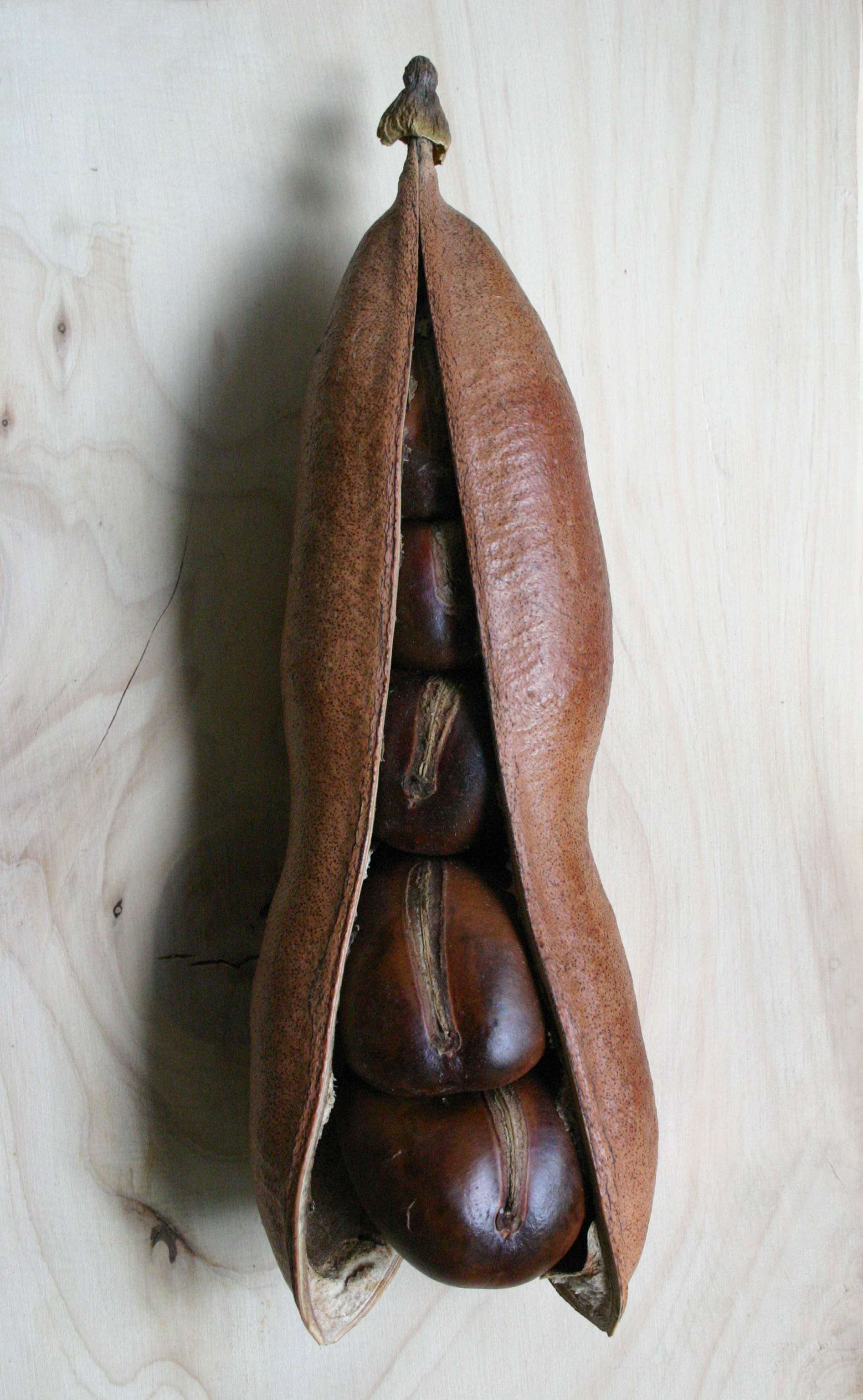
Mature pod and seeds
