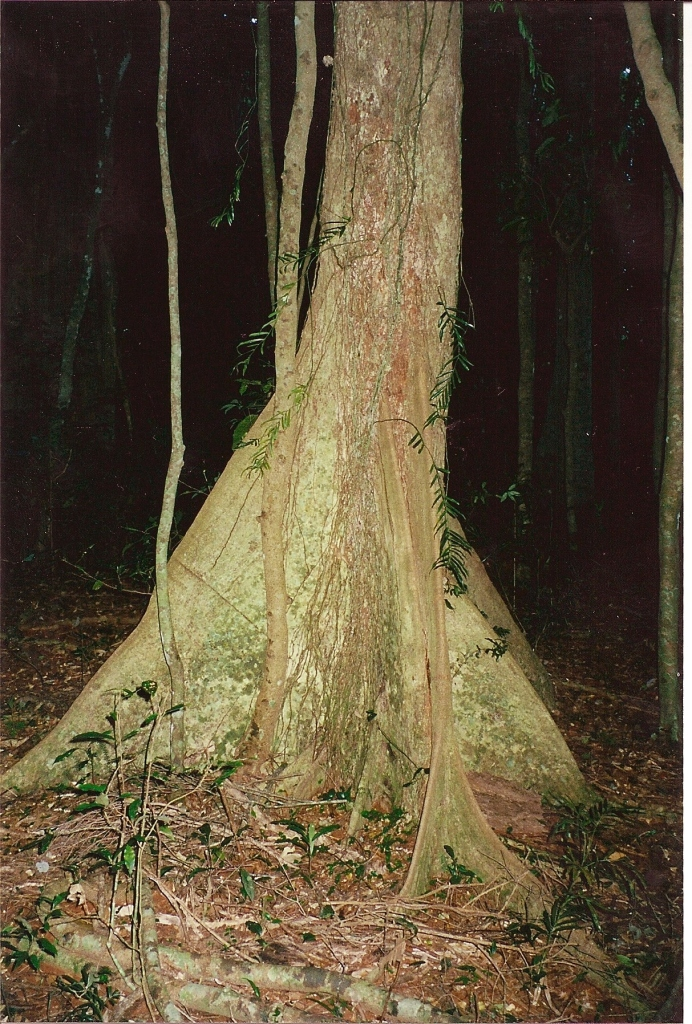
- Davis Scrub Nature Reserve

Scientific classification
- Kingdom: Plantae
- Clade: Tracheophytes
- Clade: Angiosperms
- Clade: Eudicots
- Clade: Rosids
- Order: Malvales
- Family: Malvaceae
- Genus: Argyrodendron
- Species: A. trifoliolatum

Binomial name
- Argyrodendron trifoliolatum F.Muell.

Synonyms
- Heritiera trifoliolata

= Argyrodendron trifoliolatum =

Species of tree

Argyrodendron trifoliolatum is an Australian rainforest tree. It is native to eastern Queensland and northeastern New South Wales, Australia, where it is known as white booyong. The locality of Booyong, New South Wales, is named after the tree. It can grow up to 45 metres tall. Its flowers, produced in great numbers from July to September, are creamy-colored and bell-shaped. The most distinctive feature of Argyrodendron trifoliolatum is that the trunks form large characteristic buttresses.

The natural habitats of the species are subtropical and dry rainforests and scrubby watercourses. It is a shade tolerant climax species and one of the main tree species in warm subtropical rainforests.

== Gallery ==
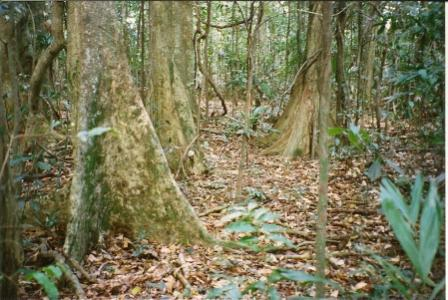
White booyong in Davis Scrub Nature Reserve

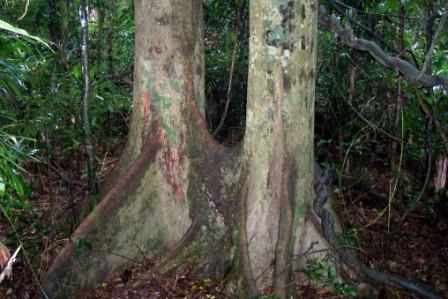
With buttress roots - Booyong Flora Reserve

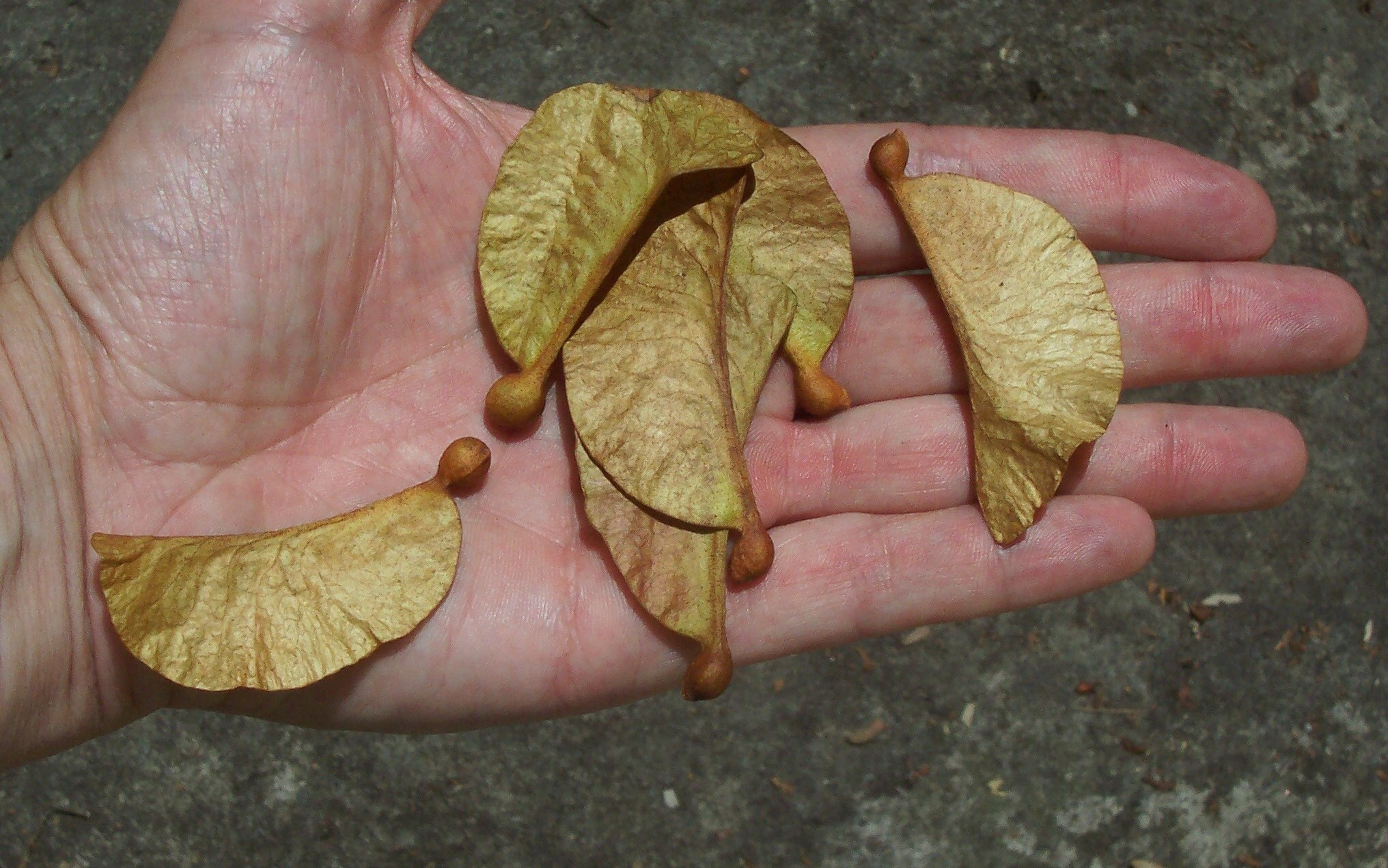
Seeds at Muston Park

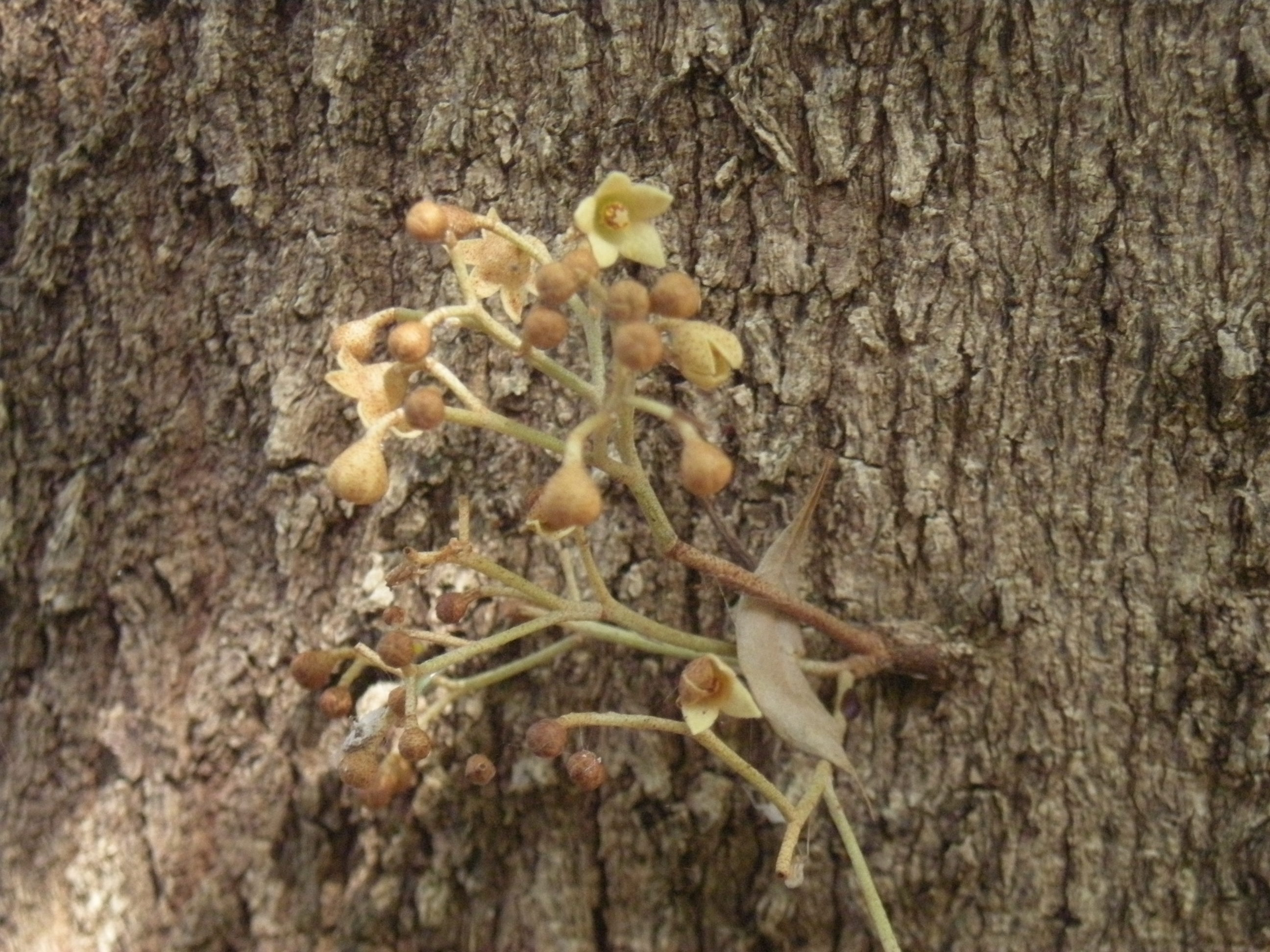
Flowers

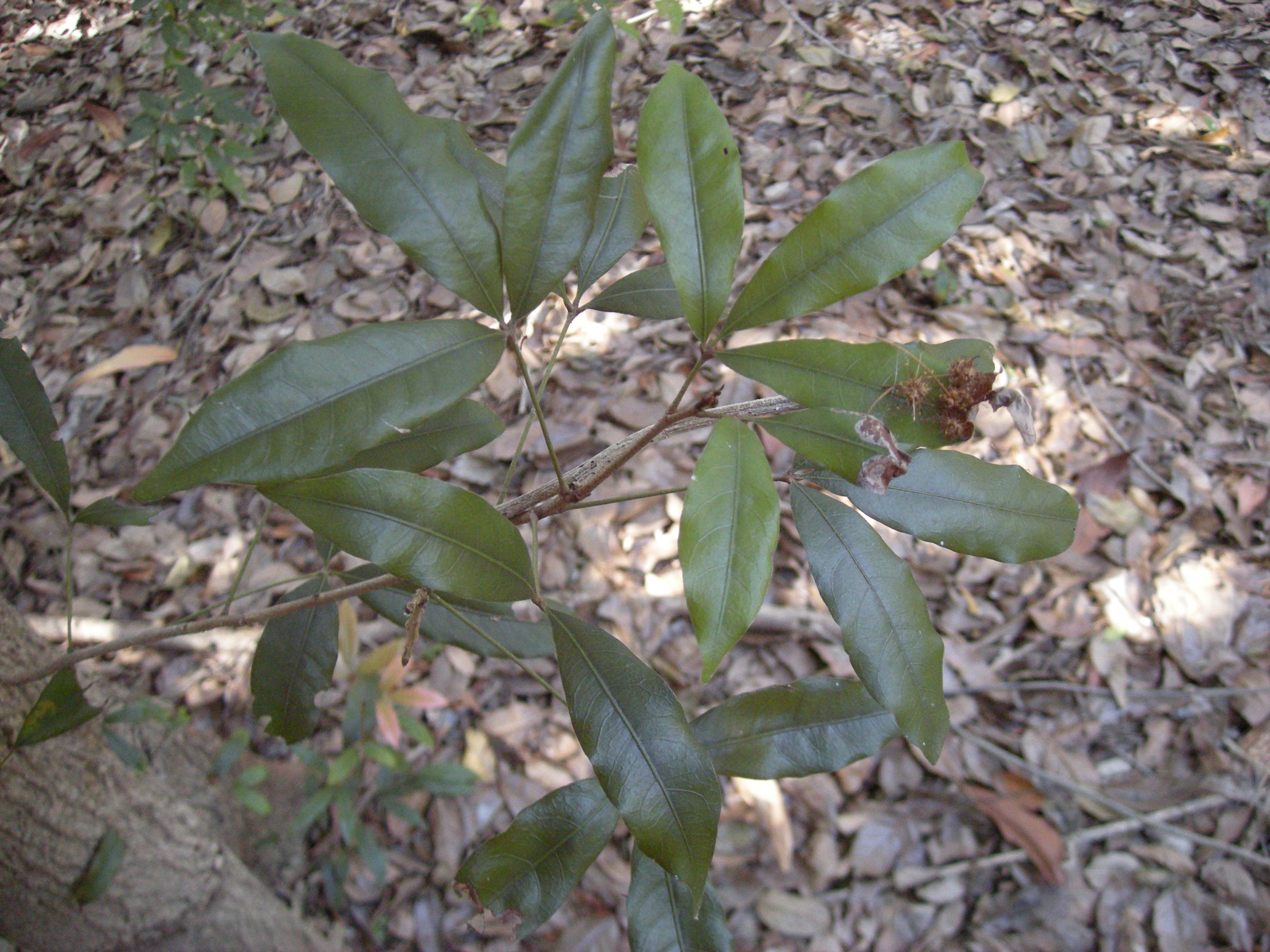
Foliage
