= Byron Bay railway station =

Former railway station in New South Wales,

Byron Bay
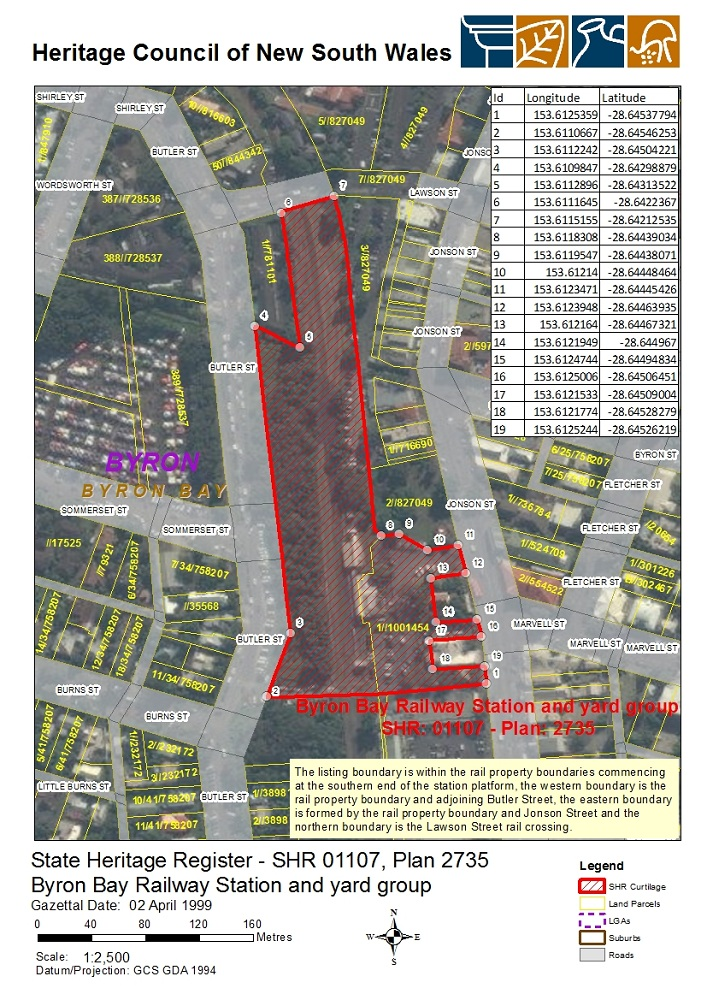
- Heritage boundaries

General information
- Location: Jonson Street, Byron Bay
- Coordinates: 28.6445°S 153.6116°E
- System: Former railway station ←Mullumbimby · Lismore→
- Owner: Transport Asset Manager of New South Wales
- Operator: NSW TrainLink
- Line: Murwillumbah
- Distance: 882.66 kilometres from Central
- Platforms: 1
- Tracks: 2

Construction
- Structure type: Ground
- Accessible: Yes

Other information
- Status: Closed to rail passenger services; NSW TrainLink coach stop

History
- Opened: 15 May 1894
- Closed: 16 May 2004
Route map
Location

Byron Bay railway station is a former railway station located on the Murwillumbah line in Byron Bay, New South Wales, Australia. It opened on 15 May 1894 and closed on 16 May 2004, when the line from Casino was closed. The station complex was built from 1894 to 1913. The property was added to the New South Wales State Heritage Register on 2 April 1999.

== Station today ==
Despite no longer being served by trains, the station remains open as a NSW TrainLink booking office. A pub occupies a building at the southern end of the platform.

The station forecourt is served by NSW TrainLink coach services to Grafton, Casino, Tweed Heads, Surfers Paradise and Brisbane, Greyhound Australia services to Brisbane, and Sydney, and Premier Motor Service services to Brisbane, Lismore and Sydney.

It is also serviced by minibus operators to Ballina, Gold Coast, and Brisbane Airports, and local bus operators Ballina Buslines and Blanch's Bus Company.

The Byron Bay Railroad Company commenced a rail service to Byron Bay with a 660/720 class railcar from its resort three kilometres north of the town in December 2017. However, it does not extend to the existing station, terminating north of the Lawson Street level crossing some 300 metres (980 ft) away.

== Description ==
The heritage-listed complex includes a timber station building in a type 4 timber standard roadside design with a brick-faced platform that was completed in 1894. A timber shed was also completed in 1894, while a timber skillion roofed signal box was completed in 1913. A water tower on Butler Street with a brick base and rivetted iron tank also dates from c. 1894.

== Platforms and services ==
Byron Bay had one platform, with a passing loop and siding at the northern end of the station. It was served by trains from Sydney including the North Coast Mail until 1973 when replaced by the Gold Coast Motorail which in February 1990 was replaced by an XPT service.

== Heritage listing ==
Byron Bay station group is a coherent group of railway buildings with good detailing and containing a number of unusual features, including the round water tank on a brick base and the railway hotel attached to the station building. The station building is an excellent example of the timber standard roadside type and the location of the station and residence in the main street of Byron bay contribute in a significant way to the streetscape of the town. The water tank is one of two tanks of this design known to survive and is therefore of high significance.

Byron Bay railway station was listed on the New South Wales State Heritage Register on 2 April 1999, having satisfied the following criteria:

- The place possesses uncommon, rare or endangered aspects of the cultural or natural history of New South Wales.
- This item is assessed as historically rare. This item is assessed as scientifically rare. This item is assessed as arch. [architecturally] rare. This item is assessed as socially rare.

== See also ==
- List of disused regional railway stations in New South Wales
