= Mullumbimby railway station =

Former railway station in New South Wales, Australia

Mullumbimby
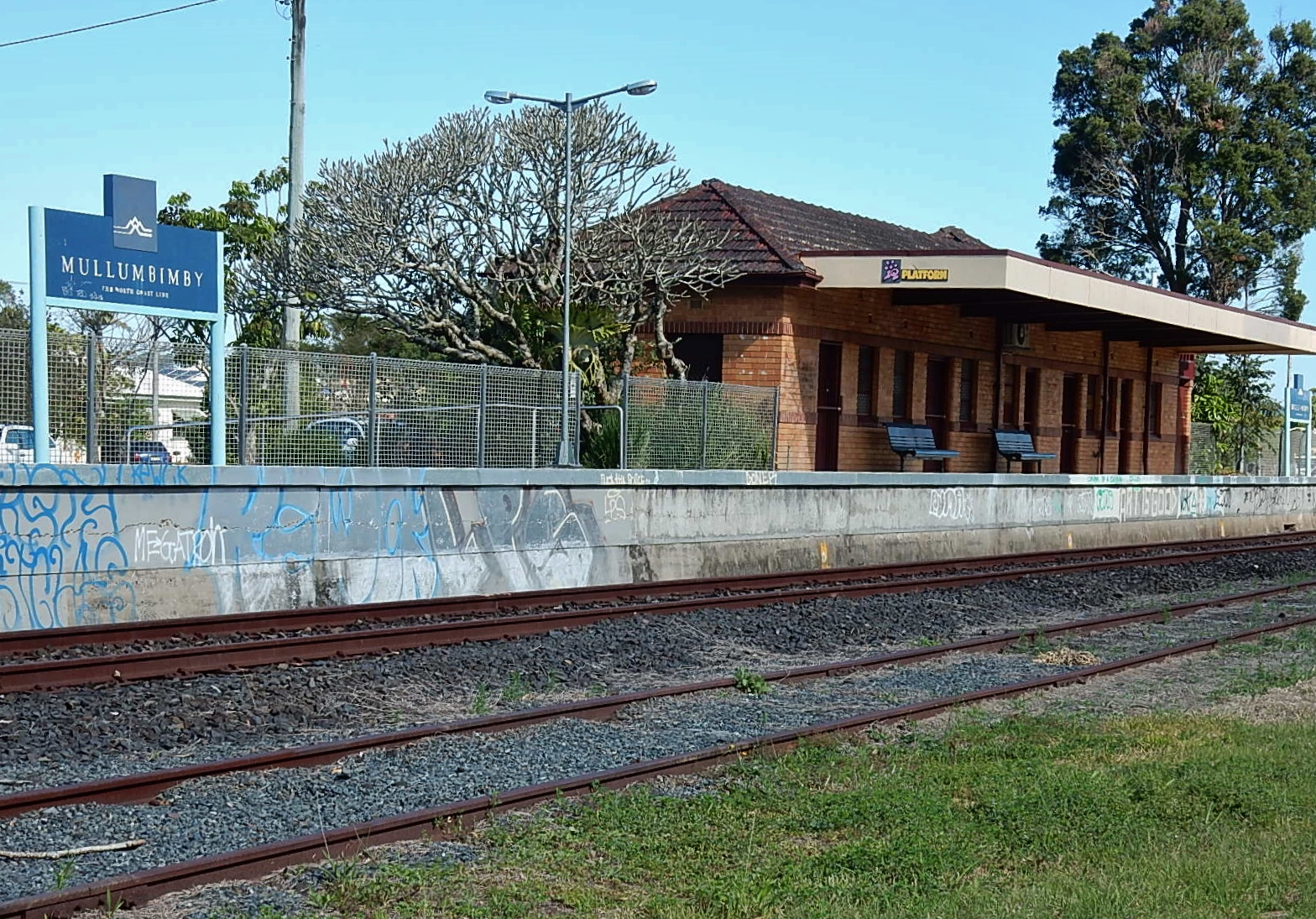

General information
- Location: Station Street, Mullumbimby
- Coordinates: 28.5544°S 153.5029°E
- Owner: Transport Asset Manager of New South Wales
- Operator: NSW TrainLink
- Line: Murwillumbah
- Distance: 898.26 kilometres from Central
- Platforms: 1
- Tracks: 2

Construction
- Structure type: Ground

Other information
- Status: NSW TrainLink coach stop

History
- Opened: 15 May 1894
- Closed: 16 May 2004
Route map
Location

Mullumbimby railway station is a disused station on the Murwillumbah line opening on 15 May 1894. It closed on 16 May 2004 when the line from Casino was closed.

The station forecourt is served by NSW TrainLink coach services to Casino and Tweed Heads.

The station building was severely damaged by a fire in the early hours of the 22nd of April, 2024, which totally destroyed the internal structure and roof.

== Platforms and services ==
Mullumbimby had one platform, with a passing loop. It was served by trains from Sydney including the North Coast Mail until 1973 when replaced by the Gold Coast Motorail which in February 1990 was replaced by an XPT service.
