= Booyong (disambiguation) =

Booyong is a common name for Argyrodendron, a genus of plants

"Booyong" may also refer to:

- Argyrodendron trifoliolatum, a species of the genus
- Booyong, New South Wales, a locality in New South Wales, Australia
- Booyong Flora Reserve, a protected area in Booyong
