= Booyong, New South Wales =

Booyong
- Suburb
- Coordinates: 28°44′54″S 153°27′04″E
- Country: Australia
- State: New South Wales
- LGAs: Byron Shire; Lismore

Government
  - State electorate: Lismore
  - Federal division: Richmond, with a small section in Page

Population
  - Total: 84 (SAL 2021)
- Time zone: UTC+10
  - Summer (DST): UTC+11
- Postcode: 2480
- County: Rous
- Parish: Teven
Suburbs around Booyong
Clunes		Nashua
Eltham	Booyong
	Pearces Creek

Booyong is a locality within the Northern Rivers region of New South Wales and it is partially in Byron Shire and partially in the City of Lismore.

For census purposes the locality is included in the village of Clunes.

The Indigenous people of Booyong are the Bundjalung (Widjabal-Wiabal) who are its traditional owners. Booyong is named using the Bundjalung language word for a species of ironwood tree, or the place of ironwood trees, which is also commonly known as the Booyong.

== Background ==
The village is located on the former Murwillumbah railway line and a station was opened the in 1894 and closed in 1974. The track work, bridges and platform for the former Booyong railway station remains. There are no buildings left in the station precinct.

It is the location of the Booyong Flora Reserve, now part of the Andrew Johnston Big Scrub Nature Reserve, which is one of the few known locations of the endangered plant Isoglossa eranthemoides.

In 2010, the biggest water gum in the Southern Hemisphere, located within the Booyong Flora Reserve, was added to the National Register of Big Trees.

== Gallery ==
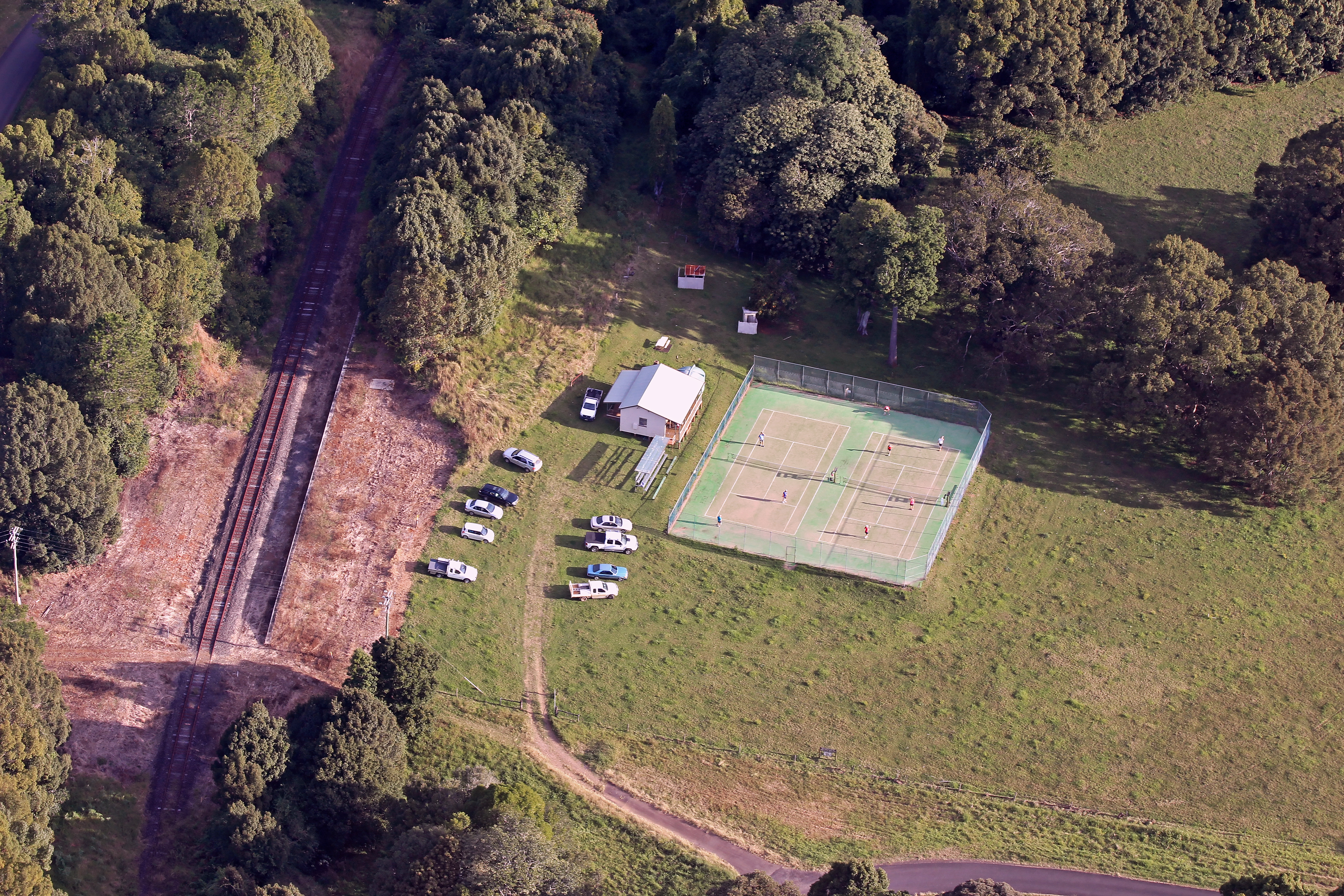
Booyong railway station and the Booyong reserve tennis courts.
