= Lismore railway station =

Former railway station in New South Wales, Australia

Lismore
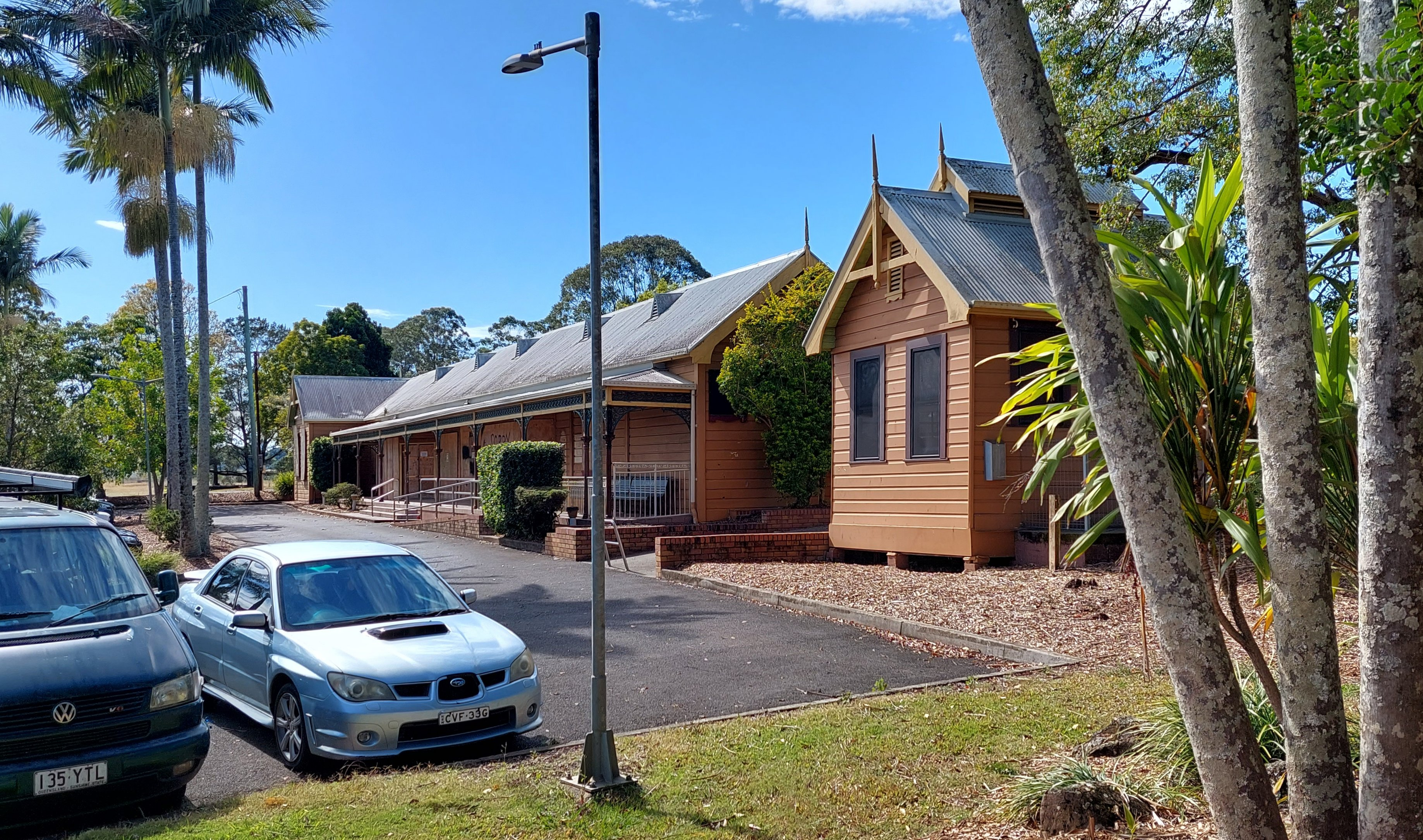
- Lismore railway station in 2023

General information
- Location: Union Street, Lismore
- Coordinates: 28.8096°S 153.2700°E
- Owner: Transport Asset Manager of New South Wales
- Operator: NSW TrainLink
- Line: Murwillumbah
- Distance: 836.03 kilometres from Central
- Platforms: 1
- Tracks: 2

Construction
- Structure type: Ground

Other information
- Status: NSW TrainLink coach stop

History
- Opened: 15 May 1894
- Closed: 16 May 2004
Route map
Location

Lismore railway station is a heritage-listed former station on the Murwillumbah line at Lismore, New South Wales, Australia, which opened in 1894 and was closed in 2004. It was added to the New South Wales State Heritage Register on 2 April 1999.

NSW TrainLink coach services to Casino and Tweed Heads stop in the station forecourt. The old line through the station is part of a rail trail.

== History ==
The station opened on 15 May 1894. It closed on 16 May 2004 when the line from Casino was closed. Since 2004, it has operated only as a bus and coach stopping point.

In 2012 and 2015, the station was used as the location for the well received NORPA (Northern Rivers Performing Arts) production "Railway Wonderland".

Following damage caused by the devastating 2022 floods that hit Lismore particularly hard, the station building was boarded up pending decisions regarding its possible future reinstatement as part of a tourism focused rail trail, however the facade was reinstated in late 2024, to coincide with the newly completed rail trail section which was officially opened in December 2024. Some locals continued to advocate the restoration of train services.

== Platforms and services ==
Lismore has one disused platform, with a passing loop. It was served by trains from Sydney including the North Coast Mail until 1973 when replaced by the Gold Coast Motorail which in February 1990 was replaced by a XPT service.

== Description ==
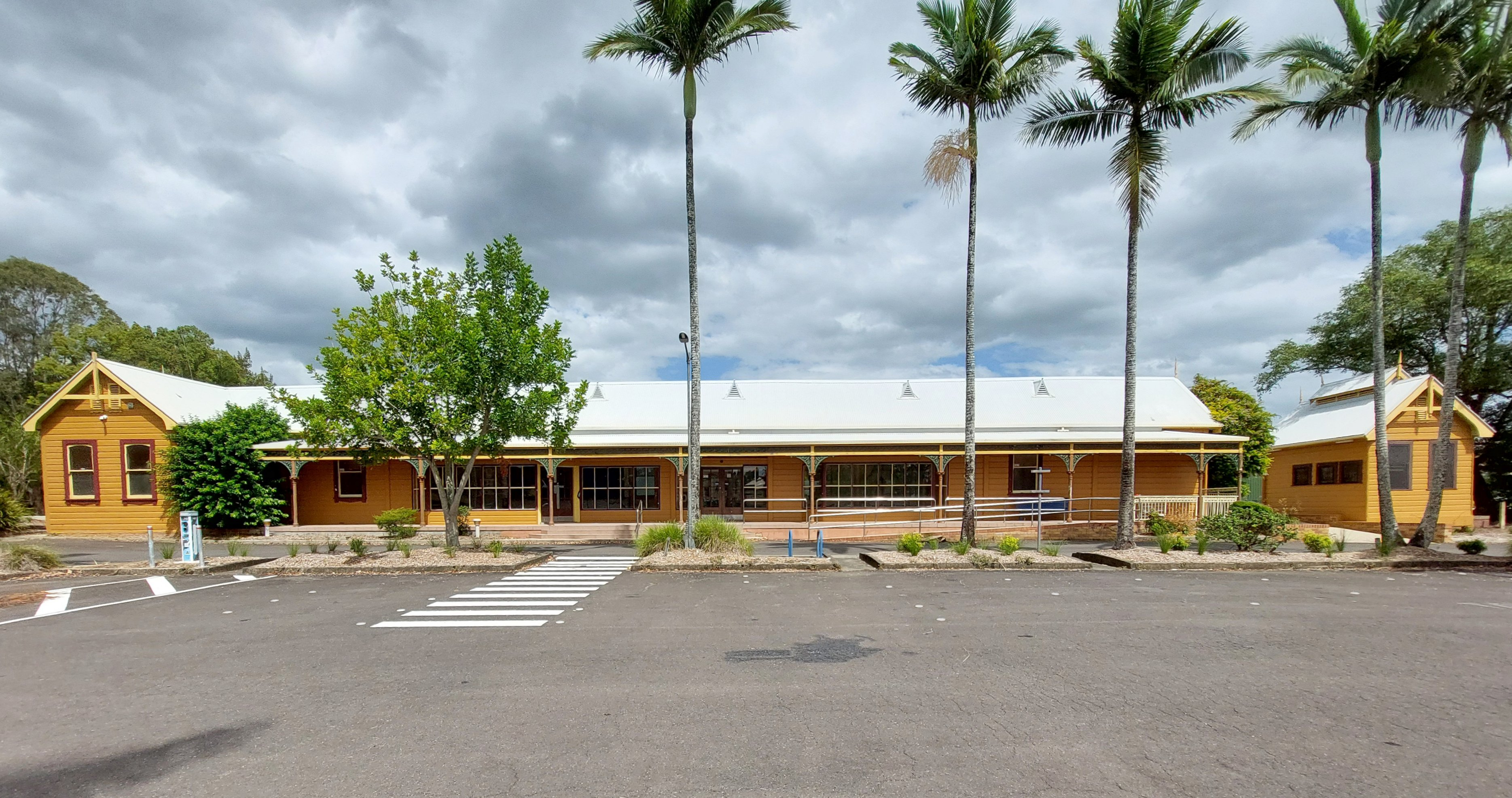
Lismore Station, front facade, February 2025 (following restoration of facade)

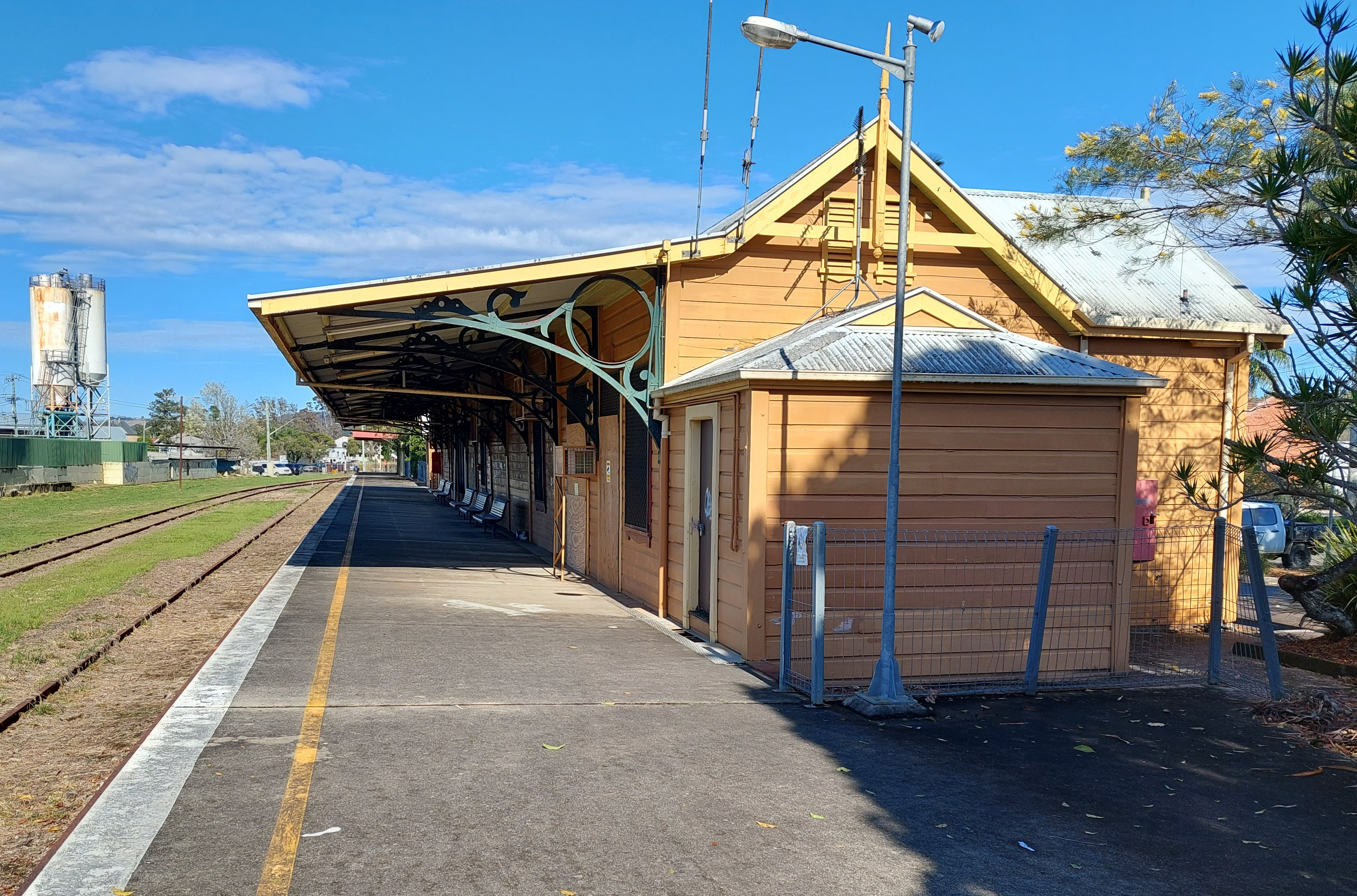
Platform and station building from the north east (2023 photograph)

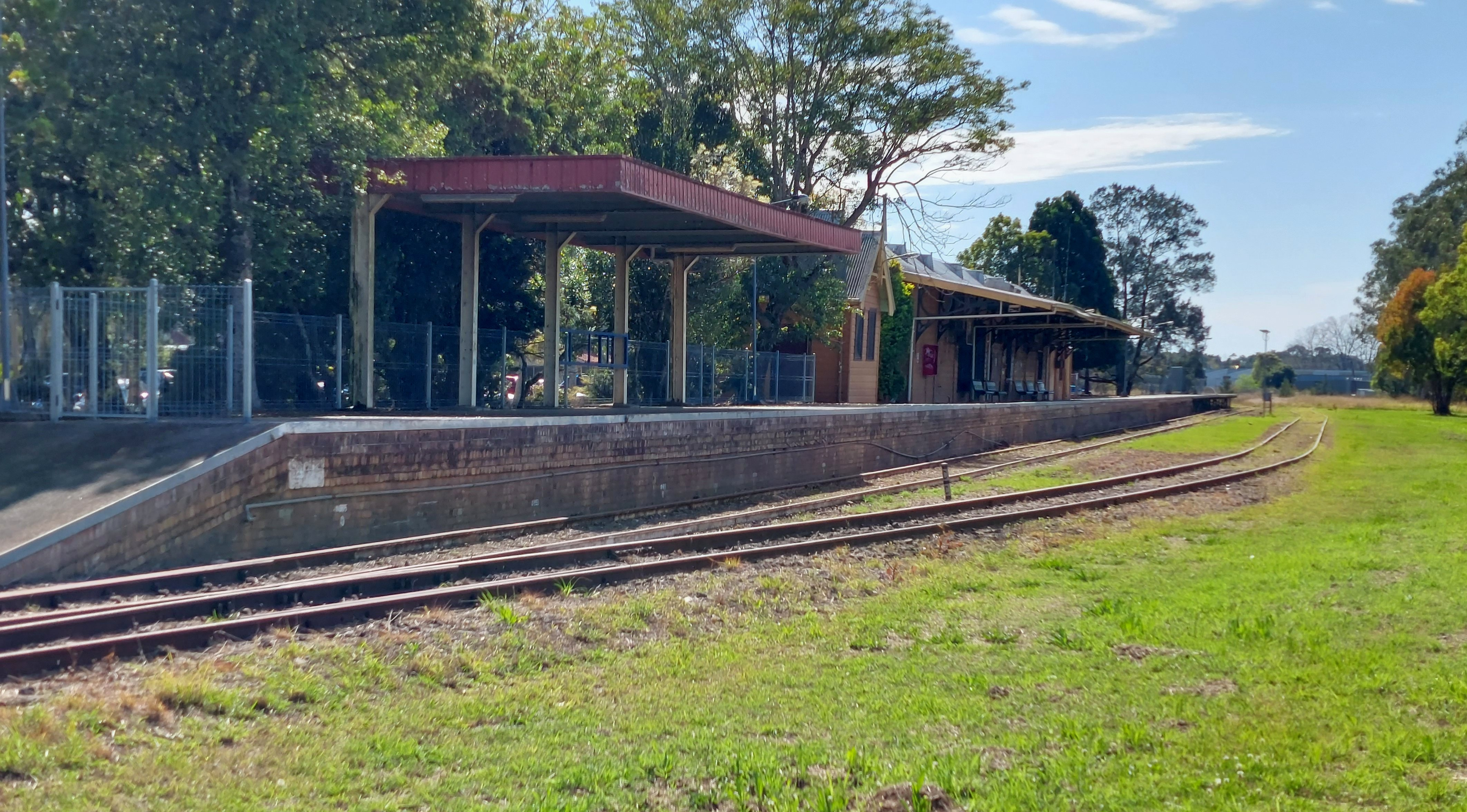
Platform and station building from the south (2023 photograph)

The former station complex consists of a third-class timber station building of a type 4 standard roadside design with a brick platform; a 2-road carriage shed with a sawtooth roof, originally 15 bays and later extended to 21 bays and a 2-road, corrugated iron locomotive shed in a straight shed design, all dating from 1894. The former station residence is located at 18 Malendy Drive.

== Heritage listing ==
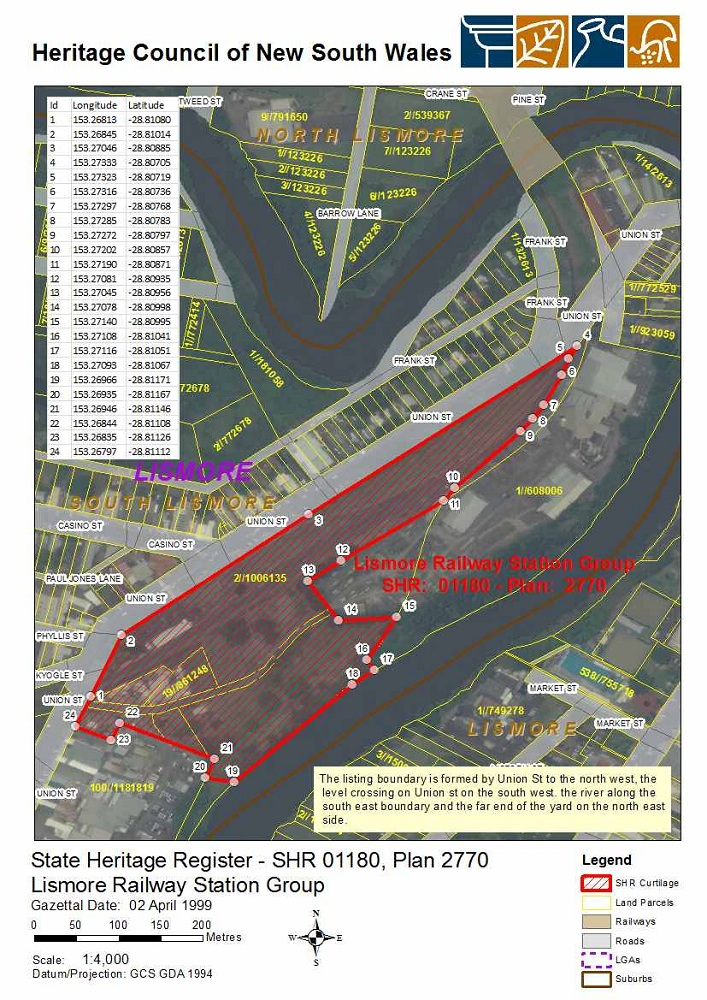
1180 – Lismore Railway Station group – SHR Plan No 1180 (5012081b100)

Lismore station and yard group is an group of railway structures with elements rarely found together and extant on the rail system. The station building is a rare timber roadside station with detailing and verandah to the street facade. The utility buildings are rare examples of their type and together in a group. The group forms an important unit in the townscape of Lismore and, combined with adjacent civic buildings, contributes important elements to the townscape.

Lismore railway station was listed on the New South Wales State Heritage Register on 2 April 1999 having satisfied the following criteria.

The place possesses uncommon, rare or endangered aspects of the cultural or natural history of New South Wales.

This item is assessed as historically rare. This item is assessed as scientifically rare. This item is assessed as arch. rare. This item is assessed as socially rare.

== Gallery ==
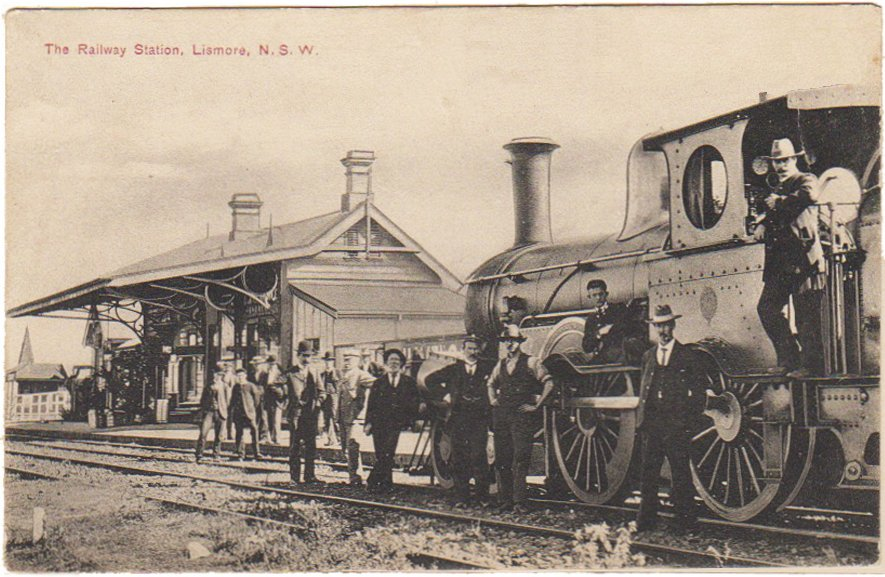
Lismore Railway Station in the late 1890s/early 1900s, platform view (from an old postcard)

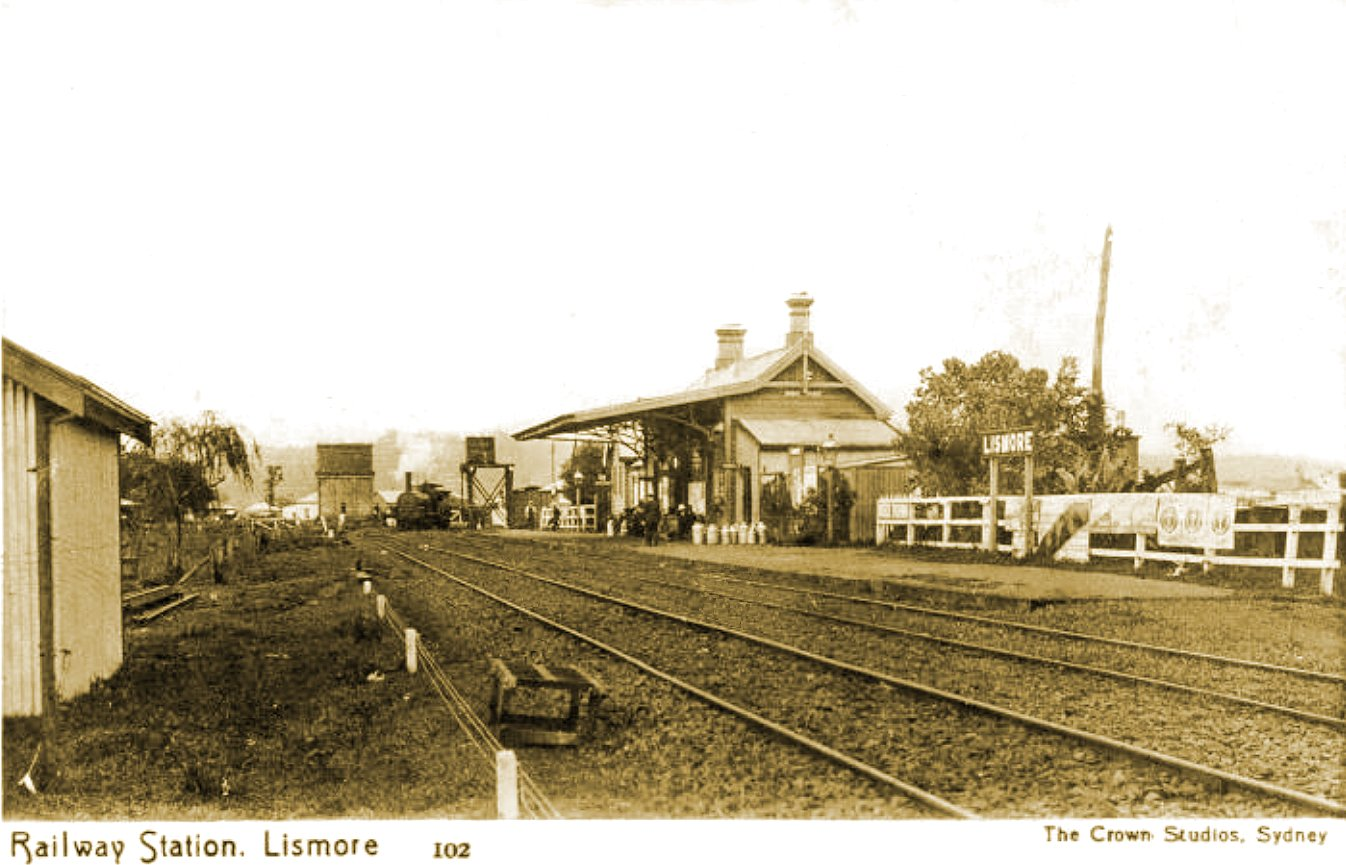
Lismore Railway Station in the late 1890s/early 1900s (from another old postcard)

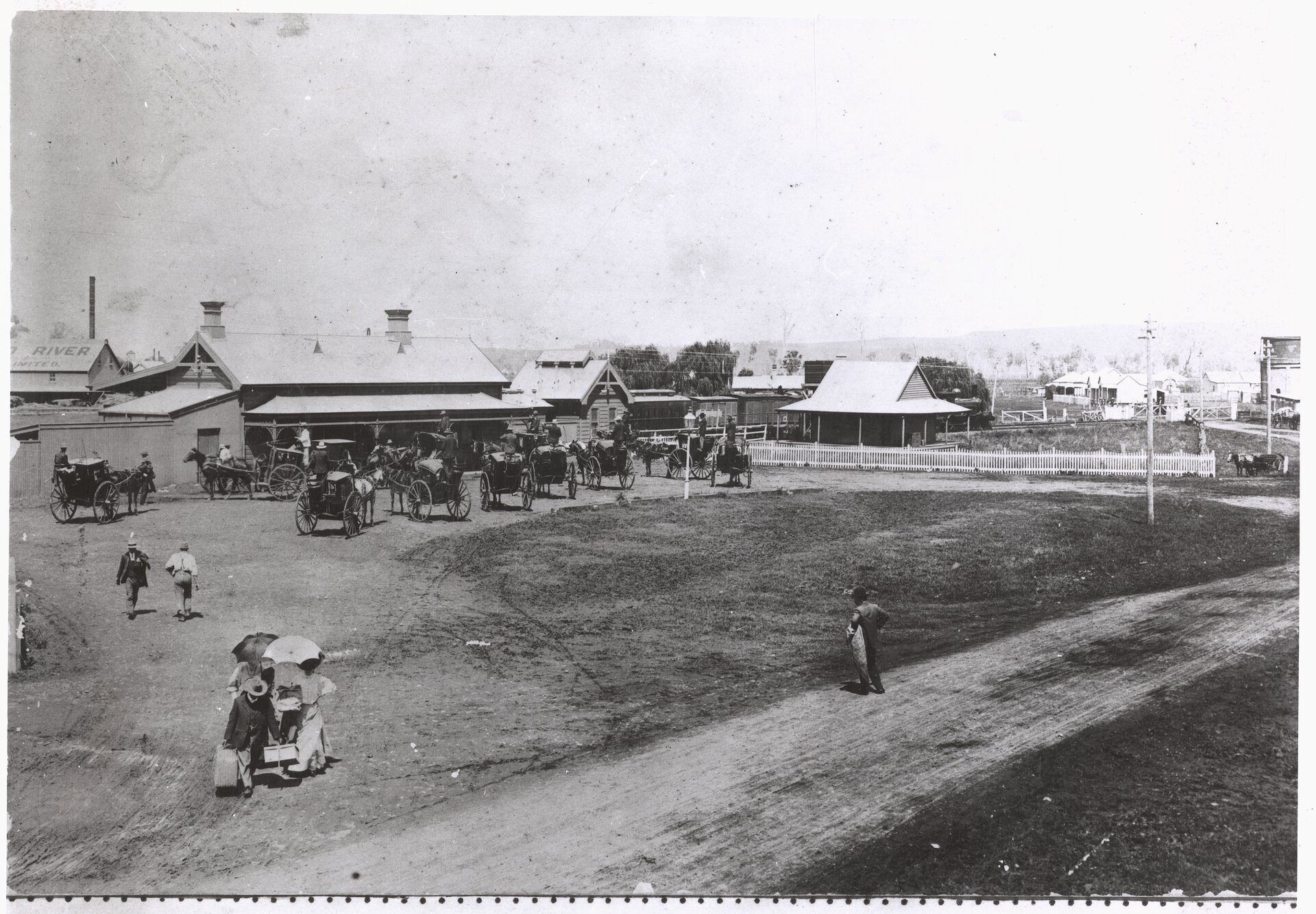
Lismore Railway Station in the early 1900s, street view (Museums of History NSW – State Archives Collection)

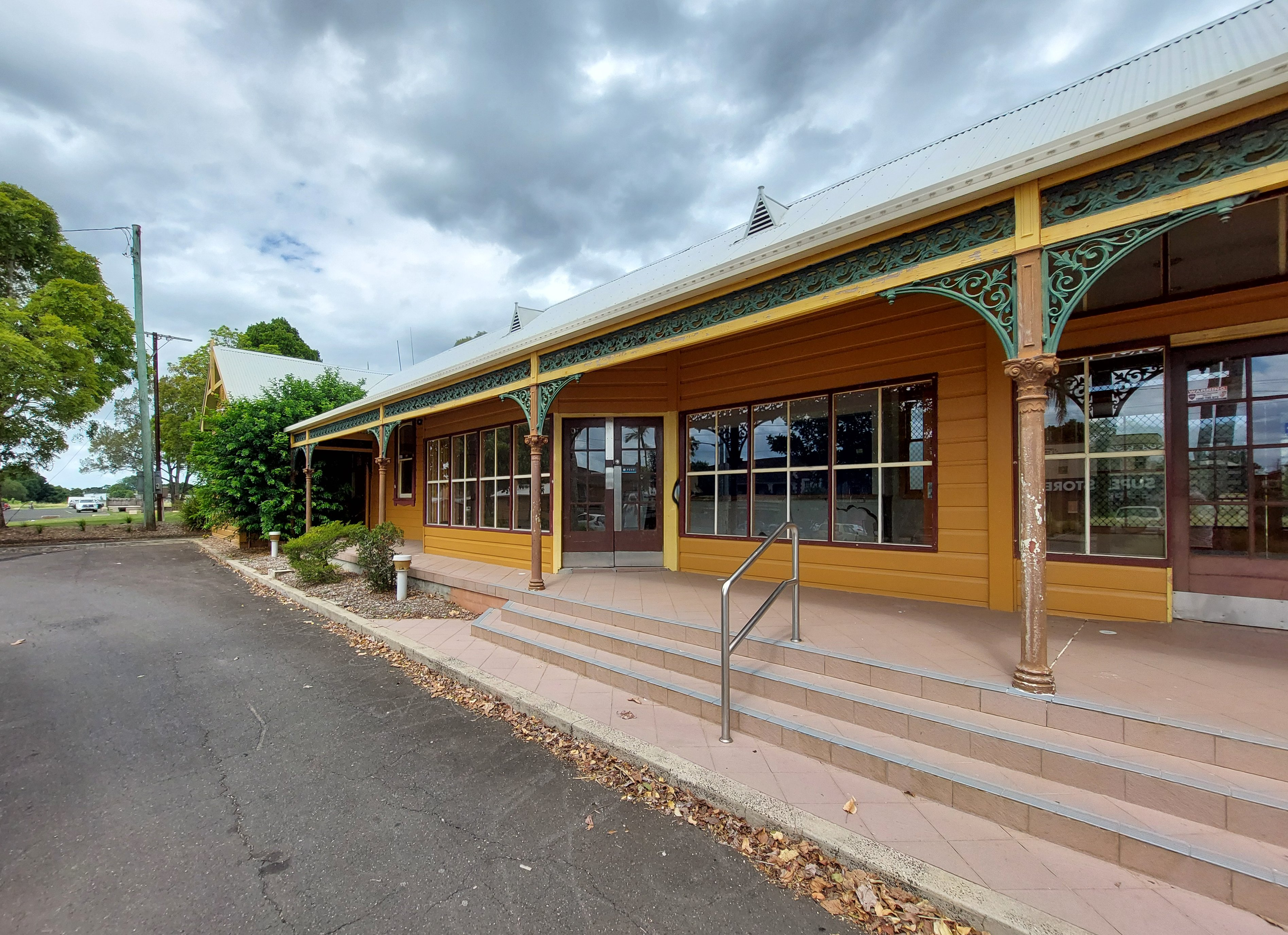
Lismore Station, February 2025

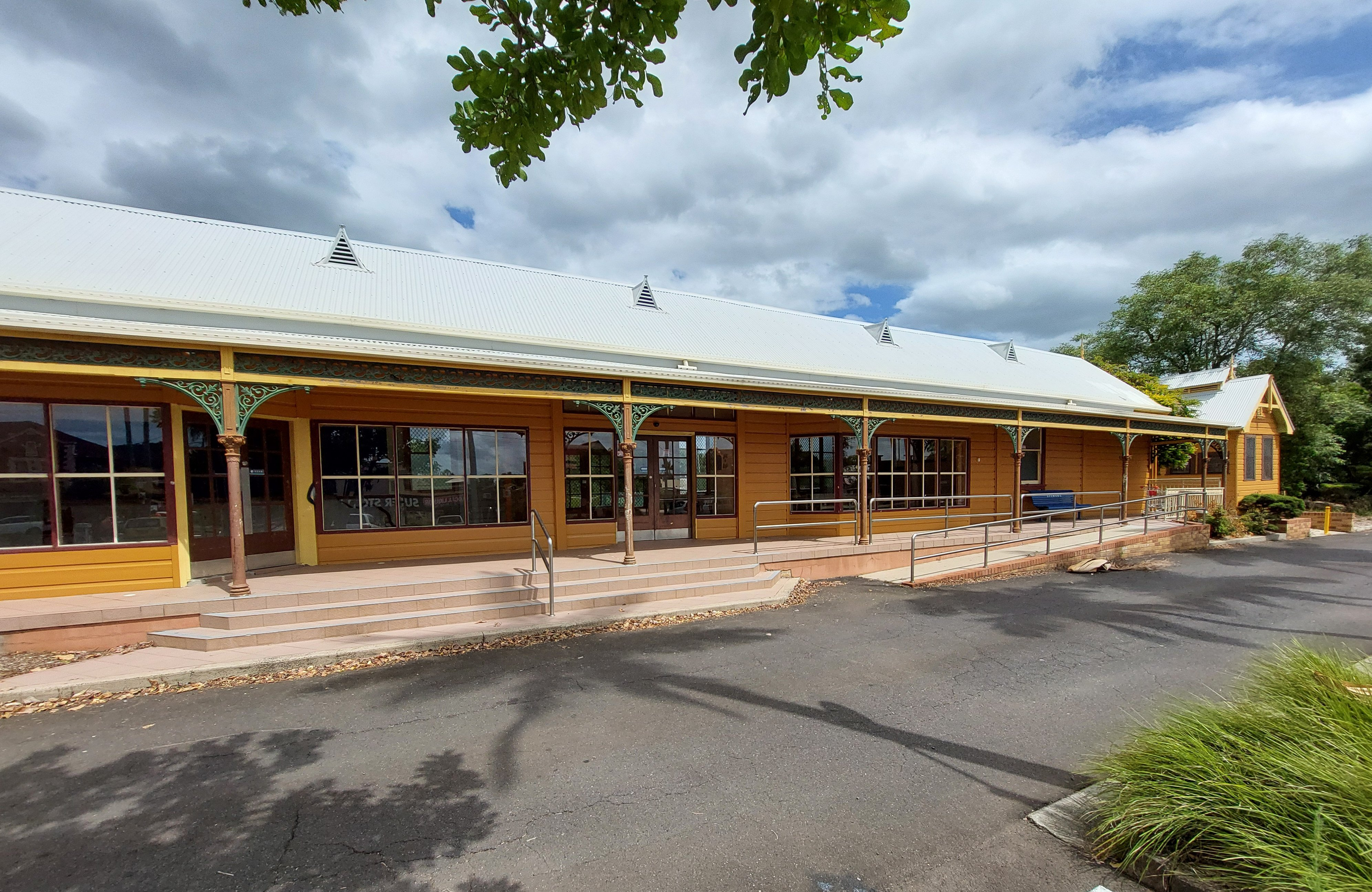
Lismore Station, February 2025

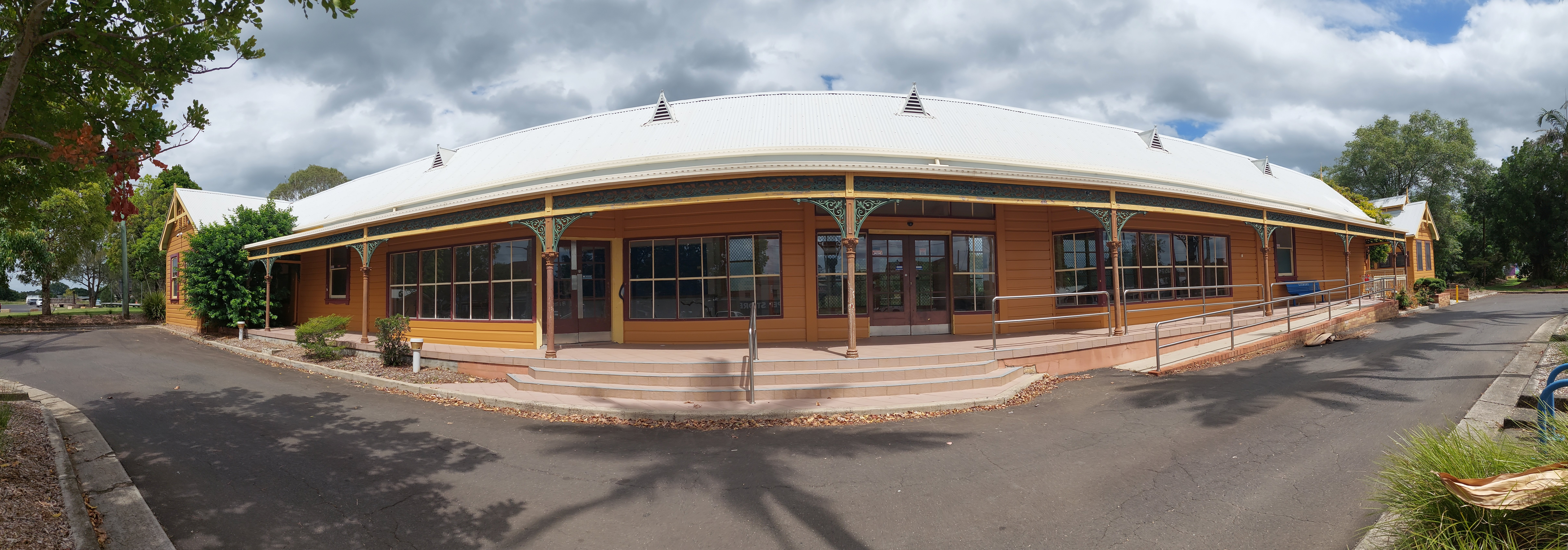
Lismore Station, February 2025 (panorama)
