= Murwillumbah railway line =

Railway line in New South Wales

Murwillumbah line
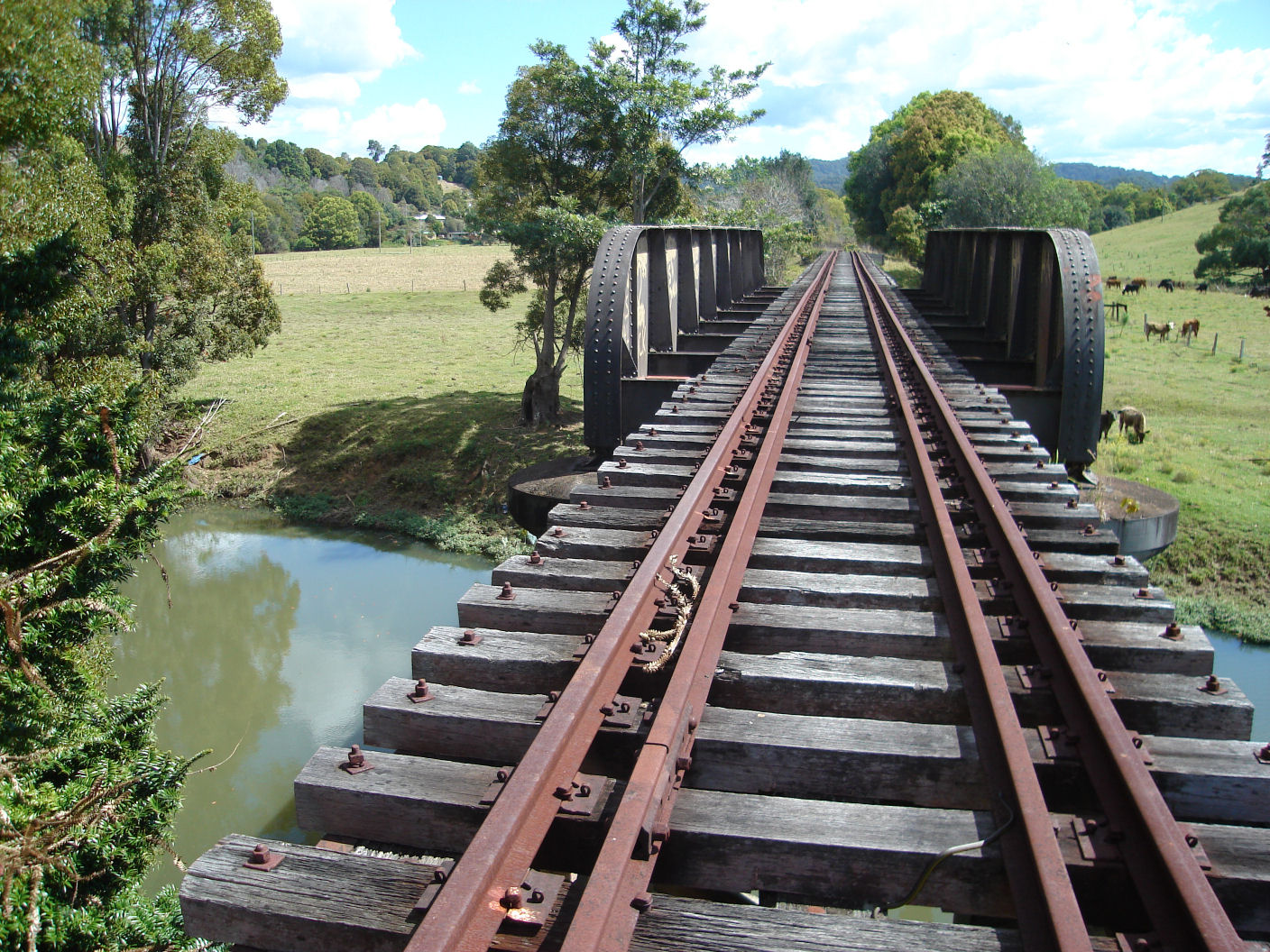
- Bridge at Mooball

Technical
- Track gauge: 1,435 mm (4 ft 8 1/2 in)

The Murwillumbah railway line is a mostly disused railway line in far north-eastern Northern Rivers New South Wales, Australia. The line ran from Casino to Lismore, Byron Bay, Mullumbimby and Murwillumbah, opening in 1894. It is one of only two branches off the North Coast line, (the other being the Dorrigo line). Train services to the region ceased in May 2004. The line from Casino to Bentley and Murwillumbah to Crabbes Creek was formally closed on 23 September 2020 to facilitate the construction of the Northern Rivers Rail Trail.

The Byron Bay Train operates over a short three kilometre section of the track in Byron Bay. It is widely considered to be the world's first solar-powered train.

Much of the disused line is planned by local governments to be paved and used as a mixed use pathway known as the Northern Rivers Rail Trail.

== Route ==
The first section of the line opened on 15 May 1894, running 38 miles 57 chains from Lismore to Mullumbimby. The next section opened on 24 December 1894, extending the line a further 24 miles 38 chains to Condong Sugar Mill via Murwillumbah. There were 5 stations on this section: Billinudgel, Mooball, Burringbar, Dunbible and Murwillumbah. These stations were built to a much cheaper standard than usual, with no platforms, instead using end platform cars. The total cost of constructing these two sections was £805,110.

An extension from Lismore to Casino was officially opened by the Governor on 14 May 1903, however trains were not expected to run until the end of June. There was hope at this time that the line could soon be connected to both Brisbane and Sydney. The line was finally opened by government gazette on 19 October 1903.

=== Branch Line ===
The Ballina branch line opened in 1930 operating between Booyong and Ballina. It was the result of lobbying by the community of Ballina. The line operated a mixed passenger and goods train six days a week but it struggled to be viable and passenger services ceases on 16 April 1943.

All services were suspended from 11 June 1948 after flood damage and landslip. The line was closed on 12 January 1949 and this closure was enacted in NSW Parliament on 14 October 1953.

The remains of this line are visible along the Booyong-Teven Road, including the piers from the bridge across North Creek Canal near Ballina.

=== Proposed Extension ===
When Queensland's South Coast line reached Tweed Heads in 1903, there were immediate calls from local Members of the Parliament of New South Wales to extend the Murwillumbah line another 18 mi (29 km) to Tweed Heads so the two railways could meet. The Parliamentary Standing Committee on Public Works Committee examined the proposal but narrowly voted against it in 1904. There were three other proposals to extend the railway to Tweed Heads before the idea was dropped in 1928.

A 1994 study by Kearney – Sinclair Knight for the State Rail Authority of NSW entitled 'Review of Investment Options – Casino to Murwillumbah line' did not favour the extension of the line to Robina. It found the mooted connecting line between Robina in the Gold Coast and Murwillumbah would merely reinforce this existing poor targeting of the service and that "...the present population density in the area is too low to provide adequate benefit to cost ratios on investments in the line.

In 2011, the NSW Department of Transport commissioned a feasibility study to reopen the Murwillumbah line, including to extend rail services in northern NSW to connect with the Queensland Rail system and Coolangatta Airport. The feasibility report was released in April 2013 and concluded it would take $952 million to bring the line back to a required standard (over $7 million per km).

== Service ==
Services were limited in the early days on the line. By 1897, there were two daily (except Sunday) services in each direction, one running the full length between Lismore and Murwillumbah, and the other running between Lismore and Byron Bay only. A similar timetable remained following the Casino extension, with the short working train now running between Lismore and Murwillumbah.

With the opening of the North Coast line through to Sydney in the 1930s, there were now three trains per day (except Sunday) in each direction. One of these ran the full length distance to/from Sydney as the North Coast Mail, while another connected with the Brisbane Limited at Casino. Another also connected with a mixed train to/from Ballina at Lismore.

From 1968, 620/720 class railcars worked this line, with set 638/738 modified to have a more powerful engine to haul a parcel trailer up the steeper grades on the line.

From 1973, the Gold Coast Motorail provided passenger and car transport between Sydney and Murwillumbah, along with the introduction of the faster North Coast Overnight Express in 1978 to meet increasing popular demand. Both services departed Sydney in the evening and ran overnight, arriving in Murwillumbah in the morning. The return services left in the afternoon and also ran through the night.

In February 1990, the Gold Coast Motorail and North Coast Overnight Express were replaced by a single unnamed CountryLink XPT service, running towards Murwillumbah in the day and returning immediately to Sydney through the night. As both capacity and time flexibility were reduced, patronage declined and became seasonal, only peaking over the summer and during school holidays.

In September 1997, FreightCorp contracted out of the operation of freight trains on the line to Northern Rivers Railroad. These services ceased in 2002. Freight traffic primarily consisted of bananas and flyash from Wyee. In May 1999, a tourist service called Ritz Rail was introduced. This train was stationed at Murwillumbah and was ordered off the Murwillumbah line in 2002 by the NSW Government, eliminating any tourist service on the line.

In April 2004, the NSW Government closed the railway line after advising that it was unprofitable to continue providing services to Murwillumbah particularly due to lack of full fare patronage. On 15 May 2004, the last XPT train left Murwillumbah station, putting an end to 110 years of rail transport in the region.

== Today ==
=== Condition ===
Very little maintenance has been done on the line since the last train ran in 2004, apart from some vegetation management. Inspections in 2013 found the line in varying condition. Steel structures were in reasonable condition, however most timber structures would require full replacement for the line to be reopened. Three 'significant' landslides, as well as 'medium to heavy density vegetation' was also obstructing the line in various locations.

=== Byron Bay Train ===
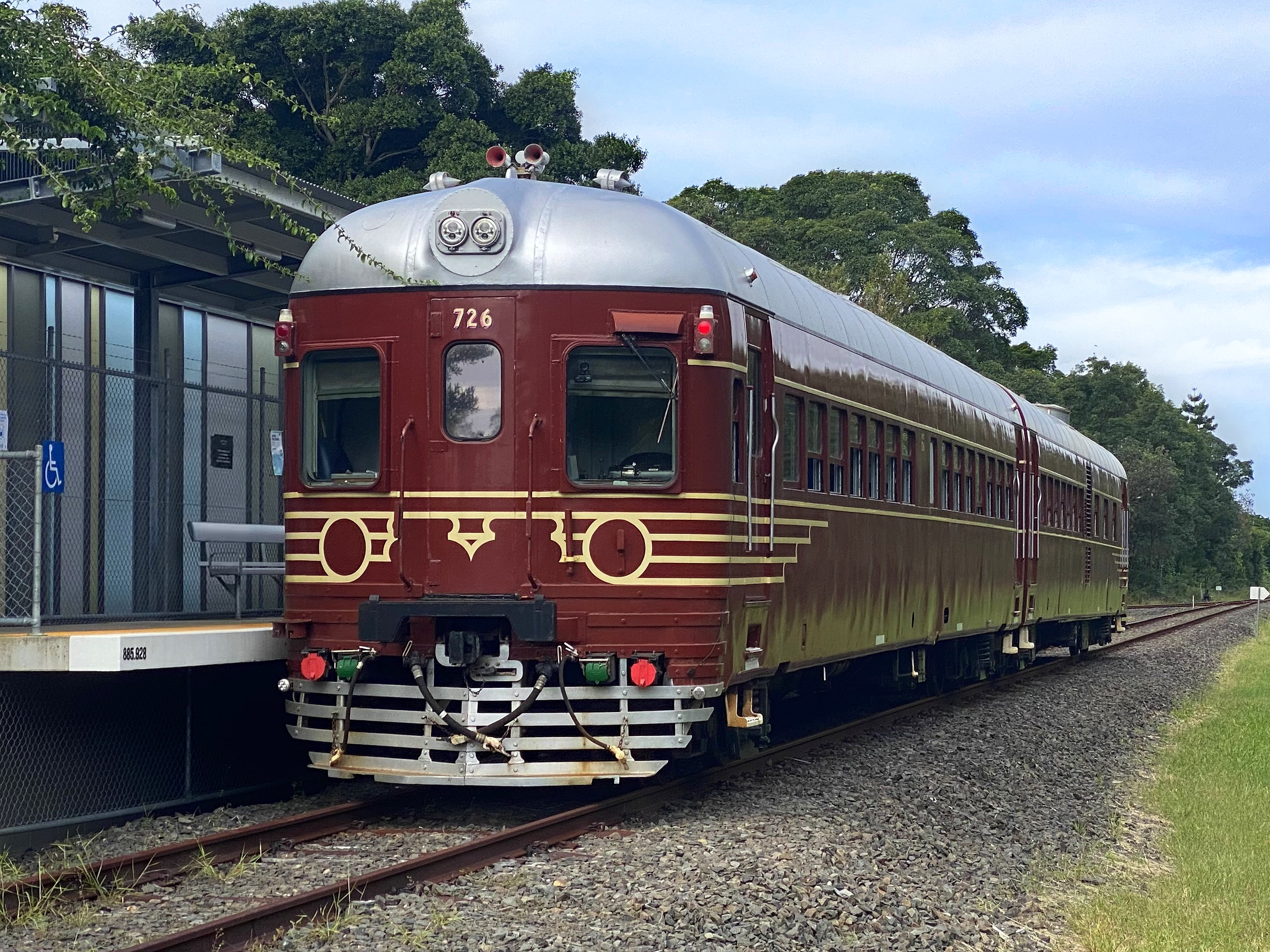
Byron Bay Train in Byron Bay

A heritage rail shuttle service began operations in Byron Bay in December 2017. The section of track to the north of the town centre has been fully restored by private investment at a cost of about $300,000 per kilometre. Track work on the section commenced on 23 May 2016 and was completed in late November 2016. A two car self-propelled diesel rail car train (661/726) has been refurbished by the Lithgow State Mine Heritage Park & Railway. This restoration was completed in 2015. New platforms and a storage shed were completed in April 2017. The train arrived in Byron Bay on 3 November 2017. It was officially confirmed in early January 2017 the train would run on solar-hybrid operation, making it the world's first solar-powered train.

On Thursday 11 January 2018, Byron Bay Railroad Company announced they had taken over 10,000 passengers on the train, just 19 days after service began. One year later, that number had increased to 100,000.

=== Northern Rivers Rail Trail ===
As of February 2026, two sections of the line have been converted into a mixed use pathway: from Murwillumbah to Crabbes Creek, and Lismore to Casino.

The trail is used by a diverse cross-section of the community from children to old age, in all weather conditions.

== Future ==
The line is not included in the Northern Rivers Regional Transport Plan.

=== Byron Line proposal ===
On 25 August 2016, The Byron Line proposal was announced by Byron Shire Mayor Simon Richardson. The Byron Line is a proposal including the refurbishment of the rail line from Bangalow to Billinudgel for light rail or rail shuttle services to be used by the local community and tourists. It was to investigate construction of a rail trail beside the tracks, where practicable. A feasibility study on this is to be the basis for seeking State funding. In June 2019 the report was released, which estimated the cost of restoring the track for a hi-rail or very light-rail service and placing a mixed use path alongside it — where that was possible — at between $30 million and $60 million.

=== Extension of the Rail Trail ===
There are proposals for the line to be fully converted to a rail trail, connecting Casino to Murwillumbah. This will boost tourism to the villages and towns along the line, providing a safe riding and walking trail for all ages away from the main roads, while respecting and educating about the lines historical significance.

The issue has remained controversial, particularly in the Byron Shire area. Those who support the proposal believe a safe rail trail, running on the track formation where possible, would increase eco tourism, provide significant safety and health benefits to cyclists and walkers all ages, preserve the historical significance of the railway corridor, and is the only economically feasible use of the formation. Some rail advocates fear that it would spell complete and permanent destruction of the railway infrastructure, would lead to the private sale of the railway corridor, and would eliminate of any future possibility of train services returning to the region.

== Gallery ==
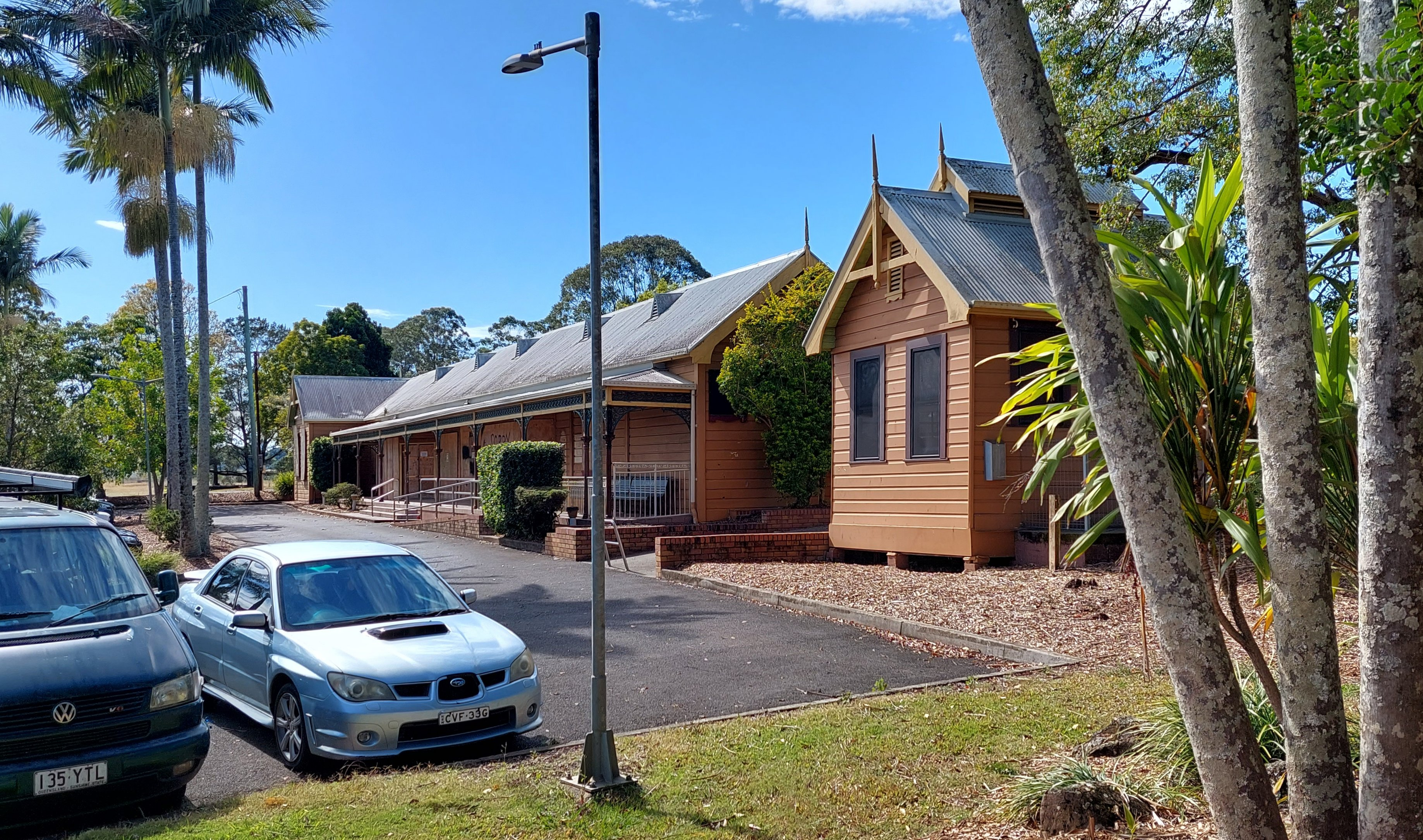
Lismore Railway station in 2023 (1)

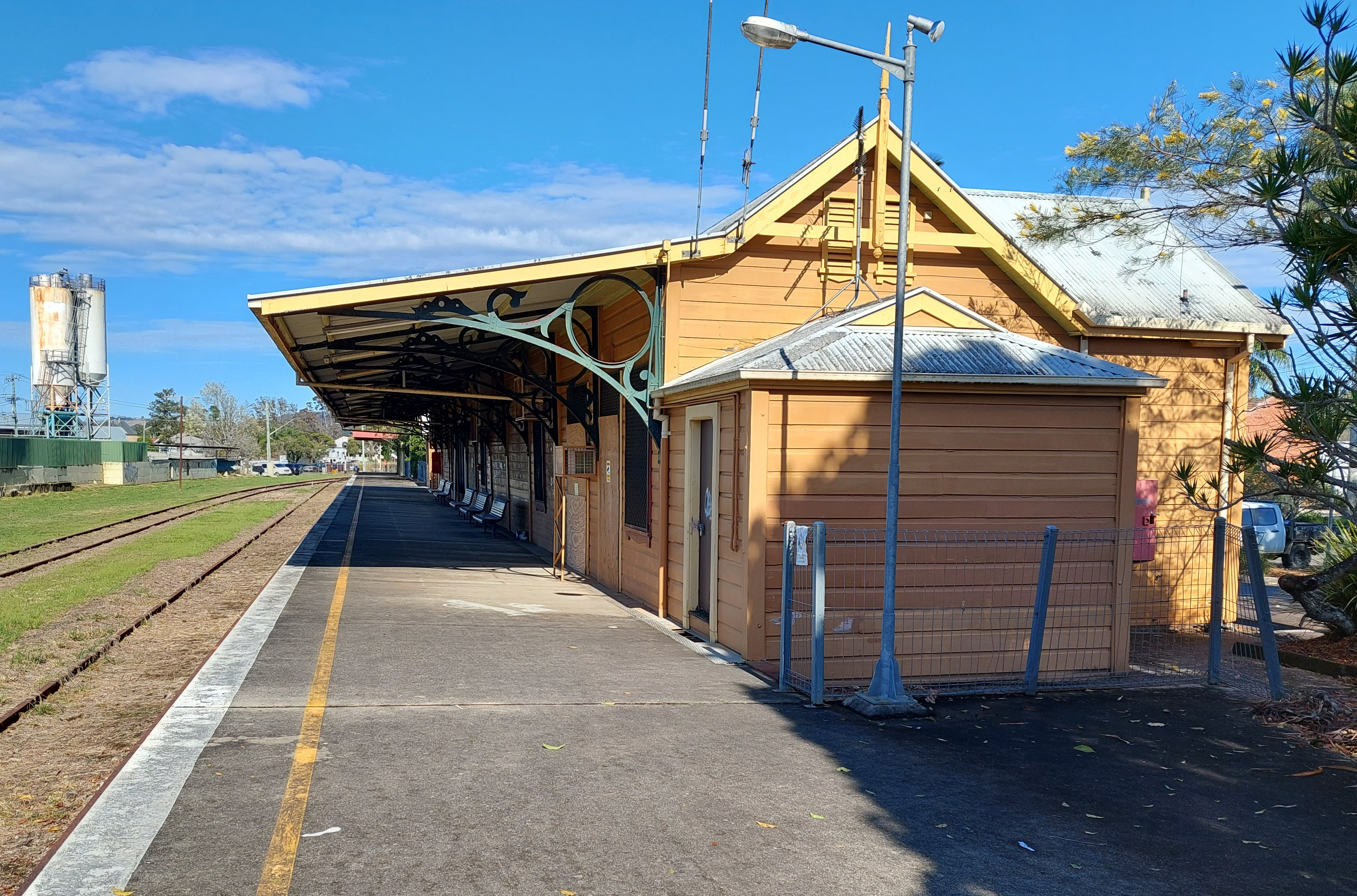
Lismore Railway station in 2023 (2)

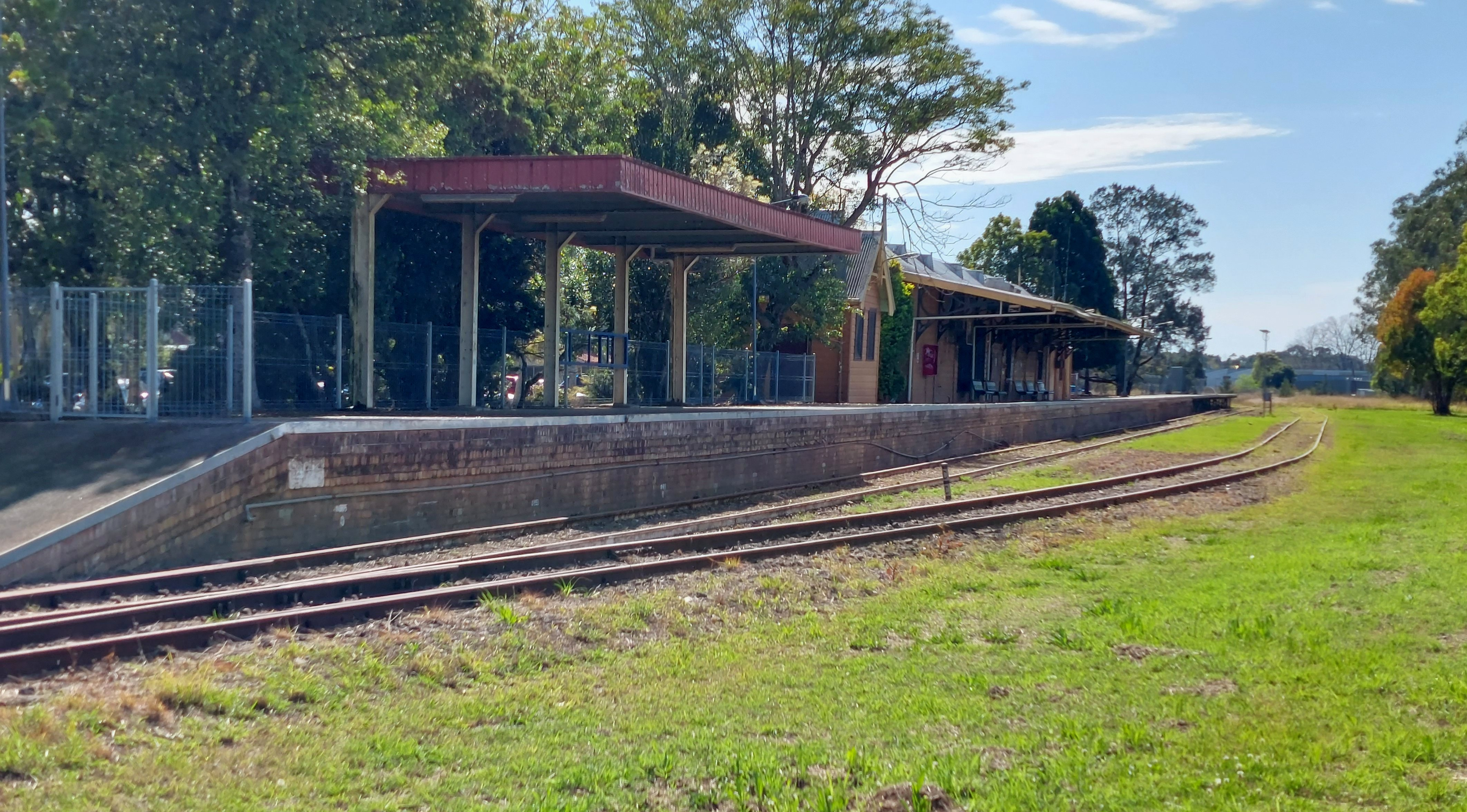
Lismore Railway station in 2023 (3)

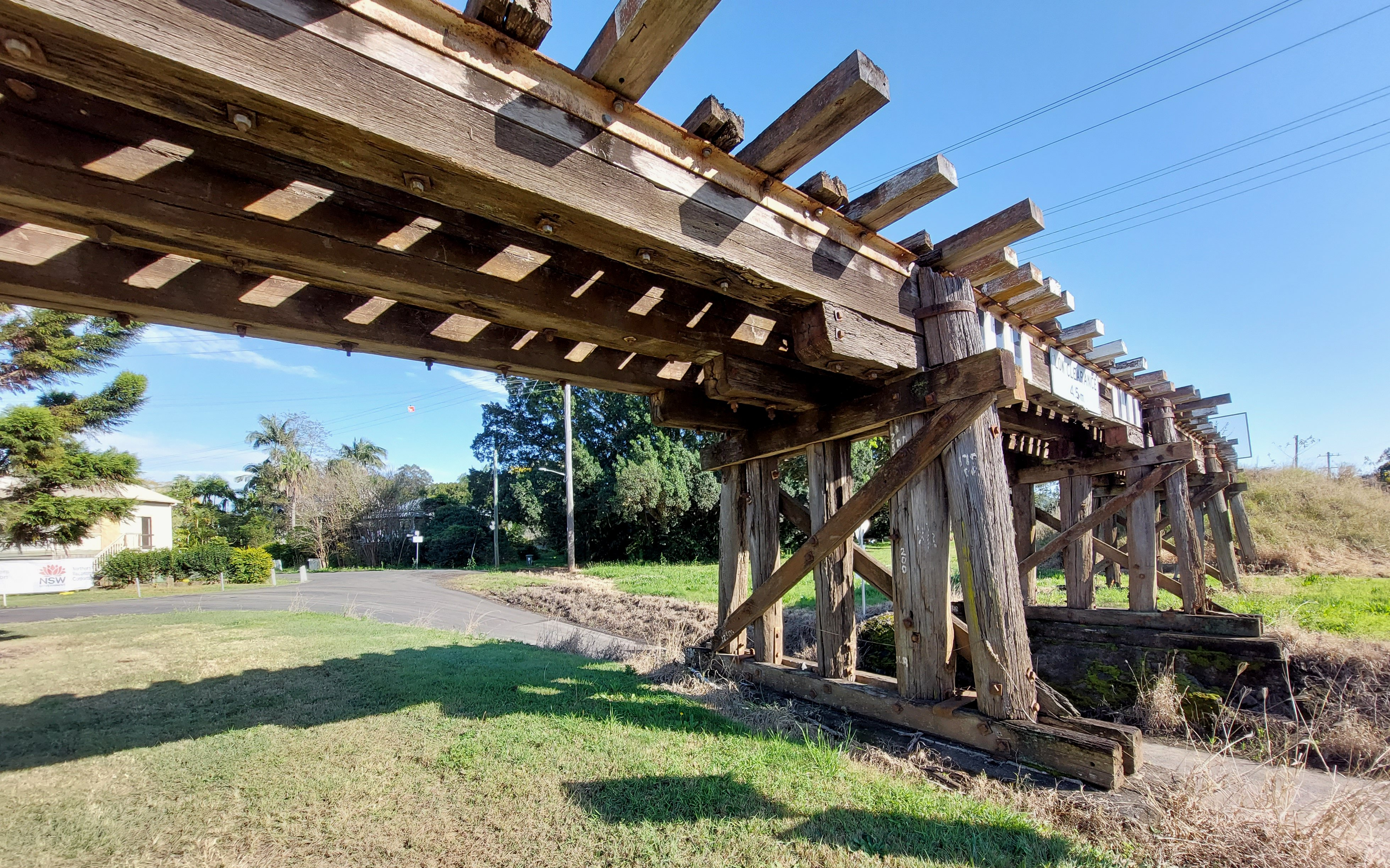
Historic railway viaduct, Union St., Lismore

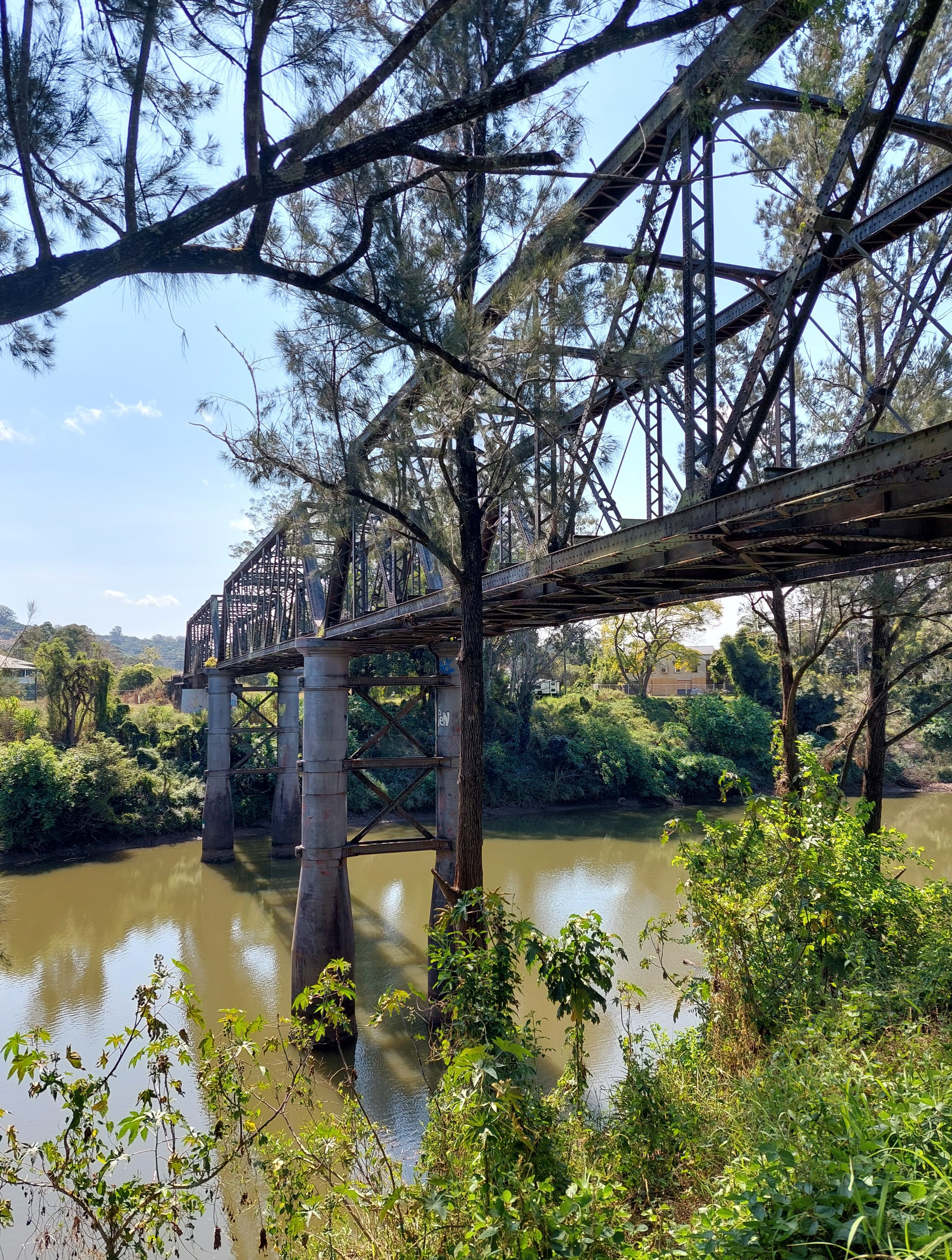
Leycester Creek bridge, Lismore in 2023 (1)

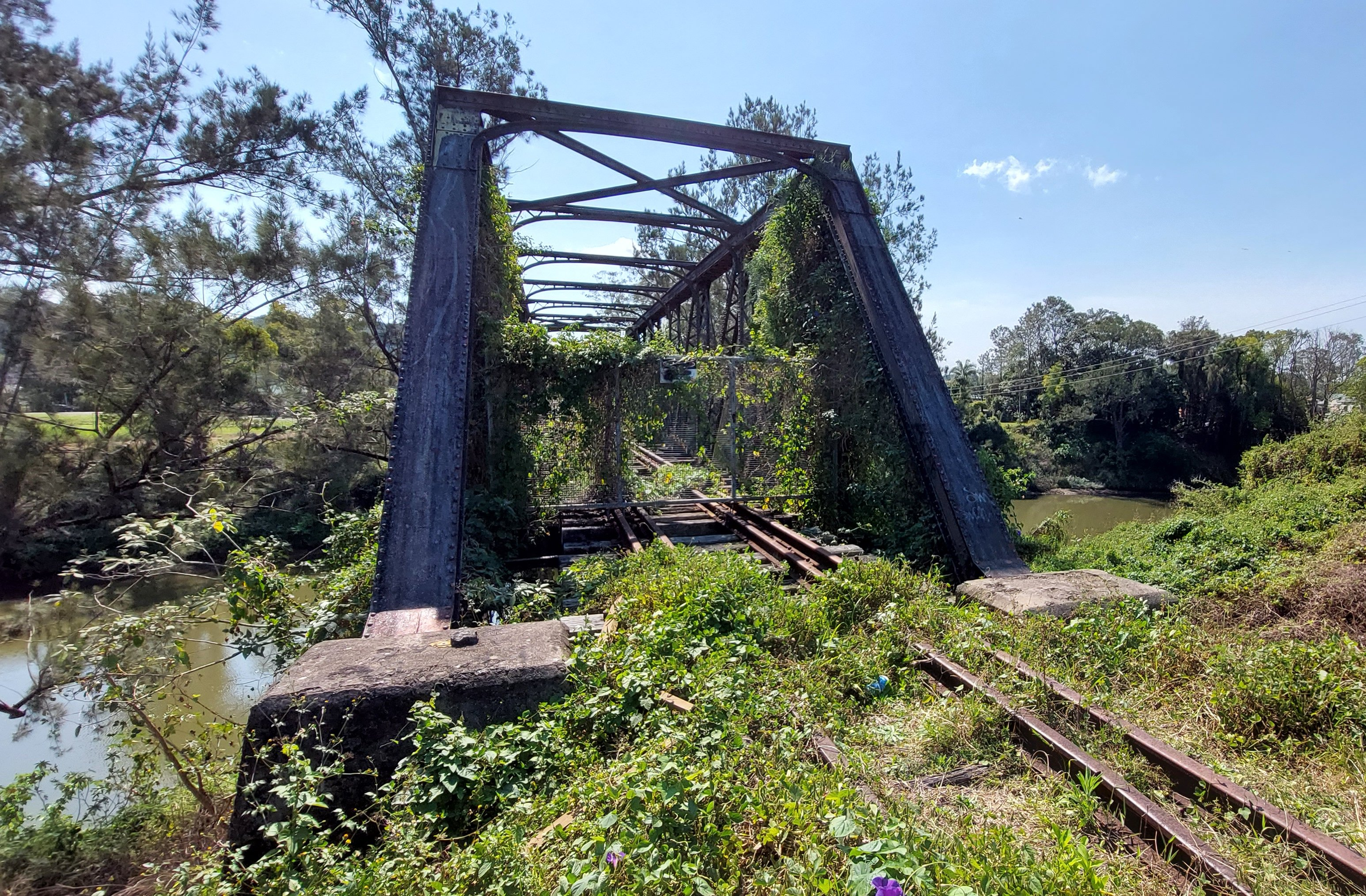
Leycester Creek bridge, Lismore in 2023 (2)

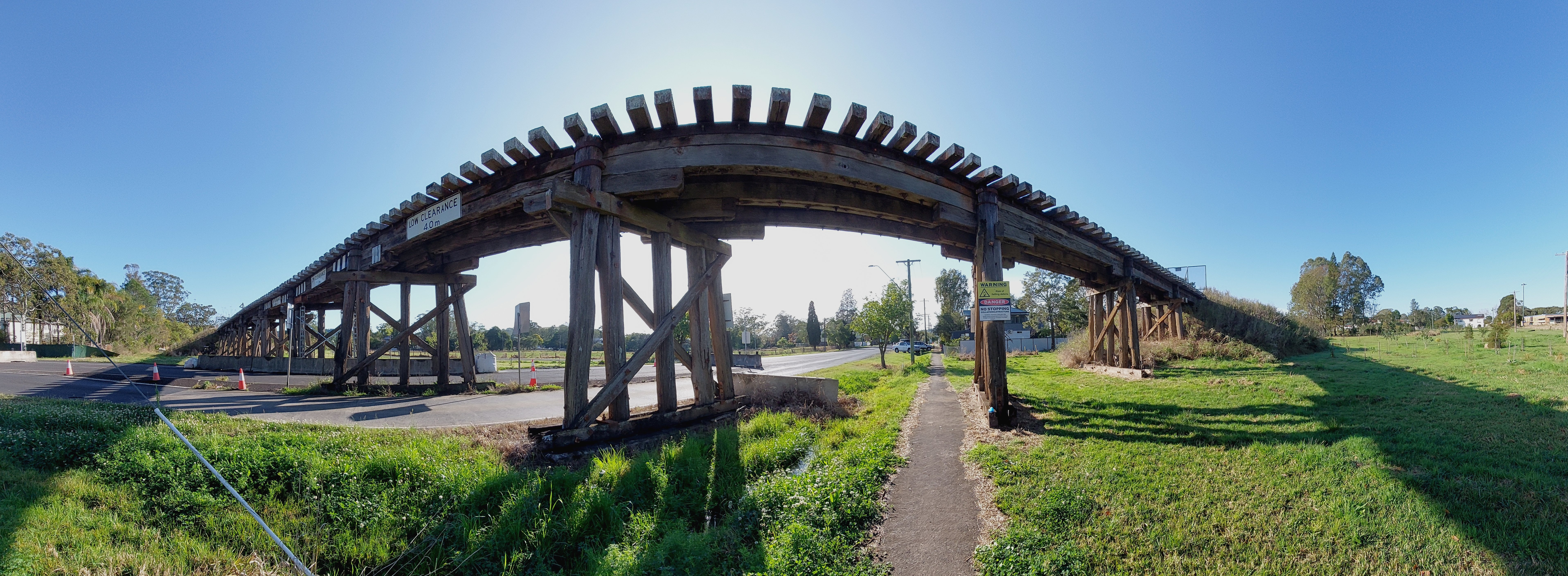
Historic railway viaduct, Terania St., Lismore

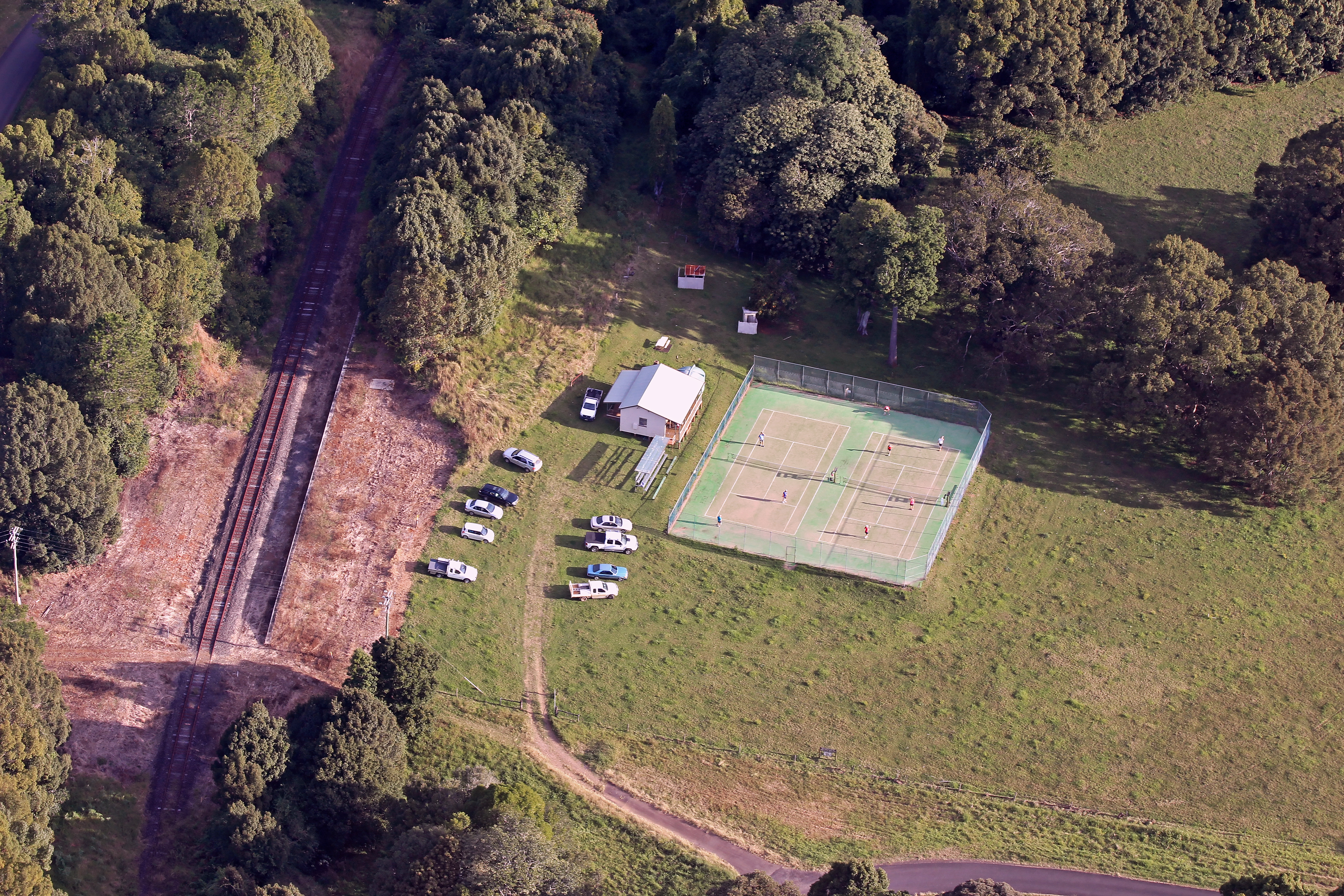
Booyong railway station

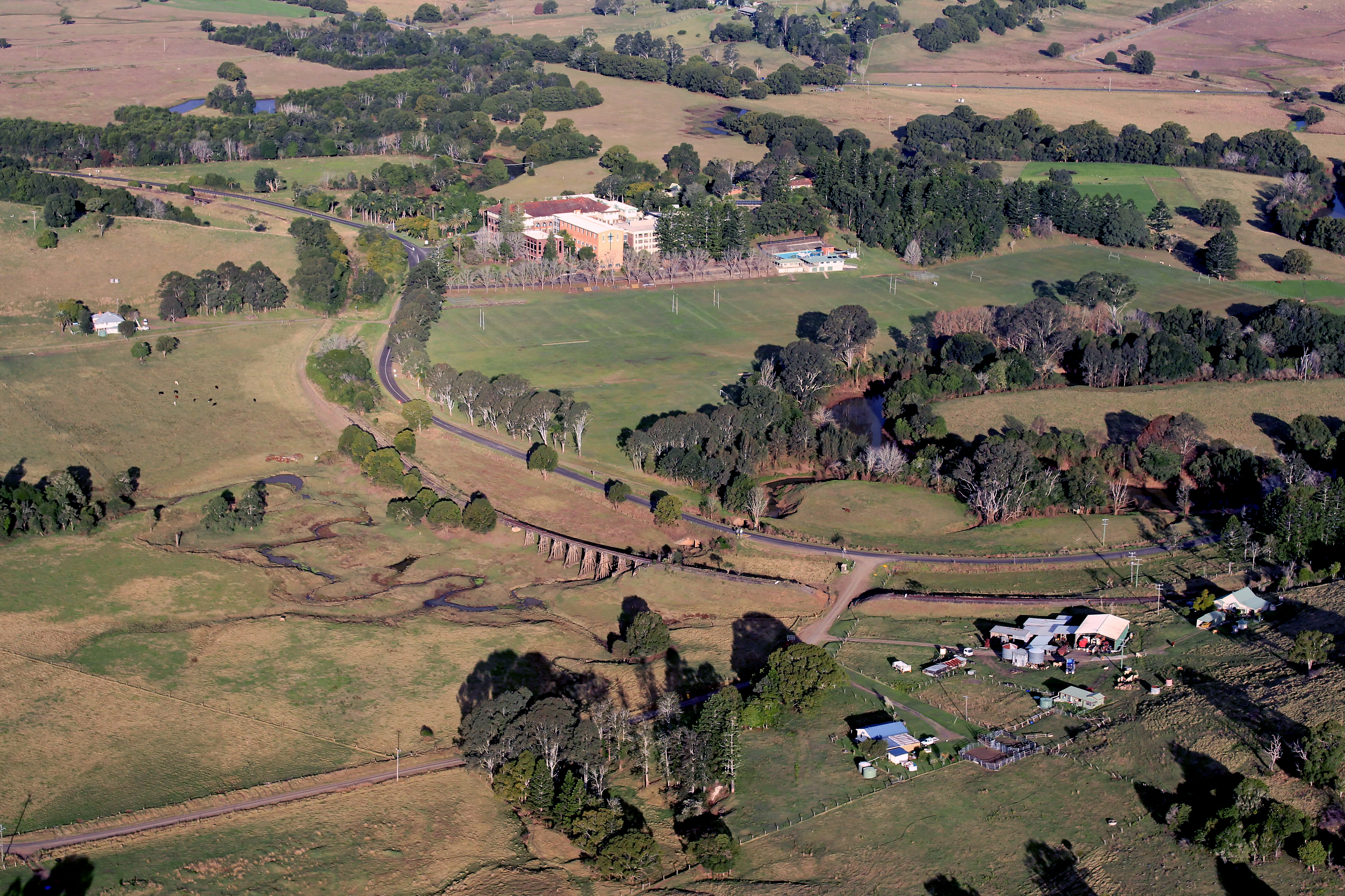
Murwillumbah Railway Line north of Lismore sweeping past Woodlawn College.

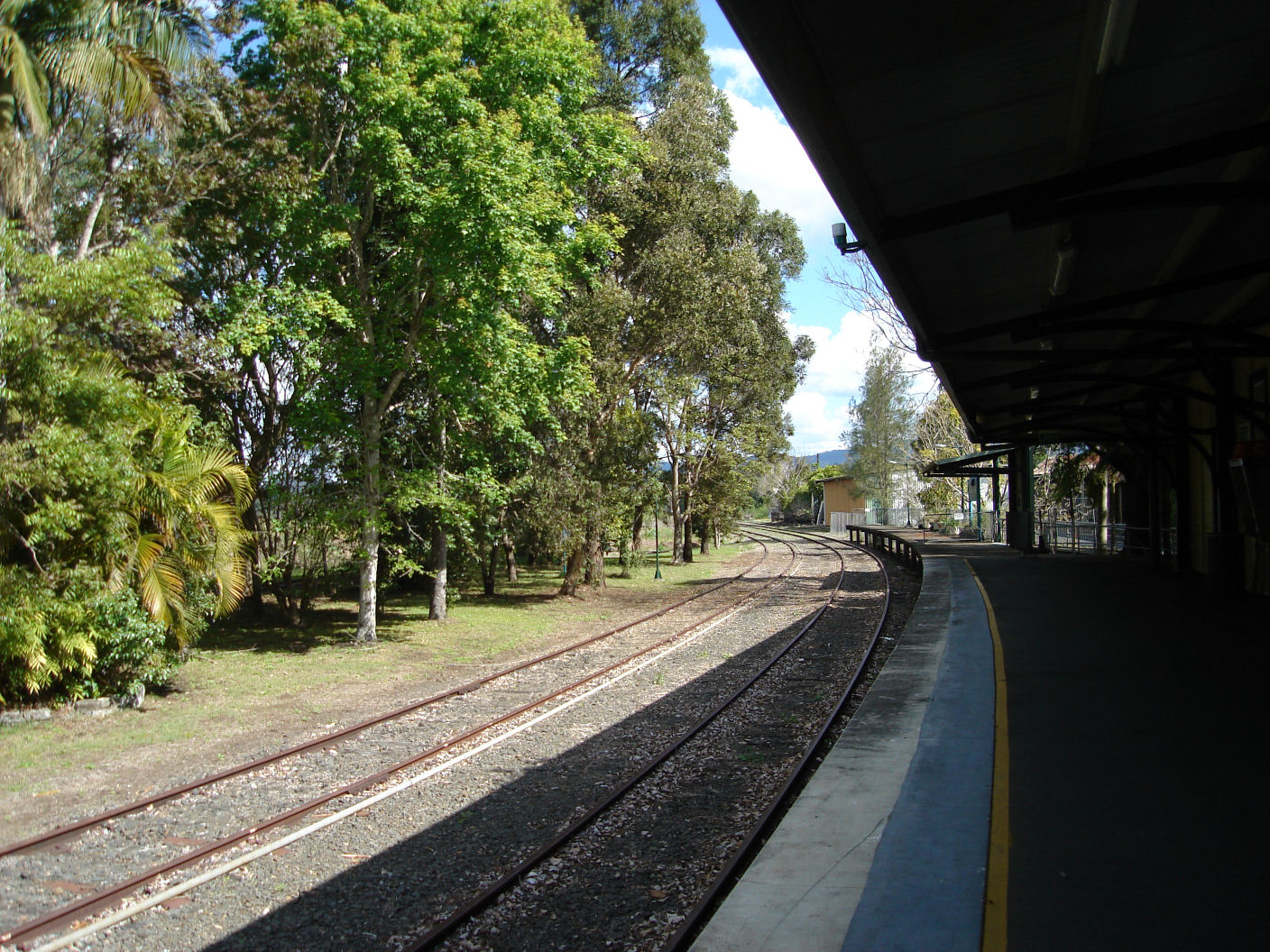
Murwillumbah station platform

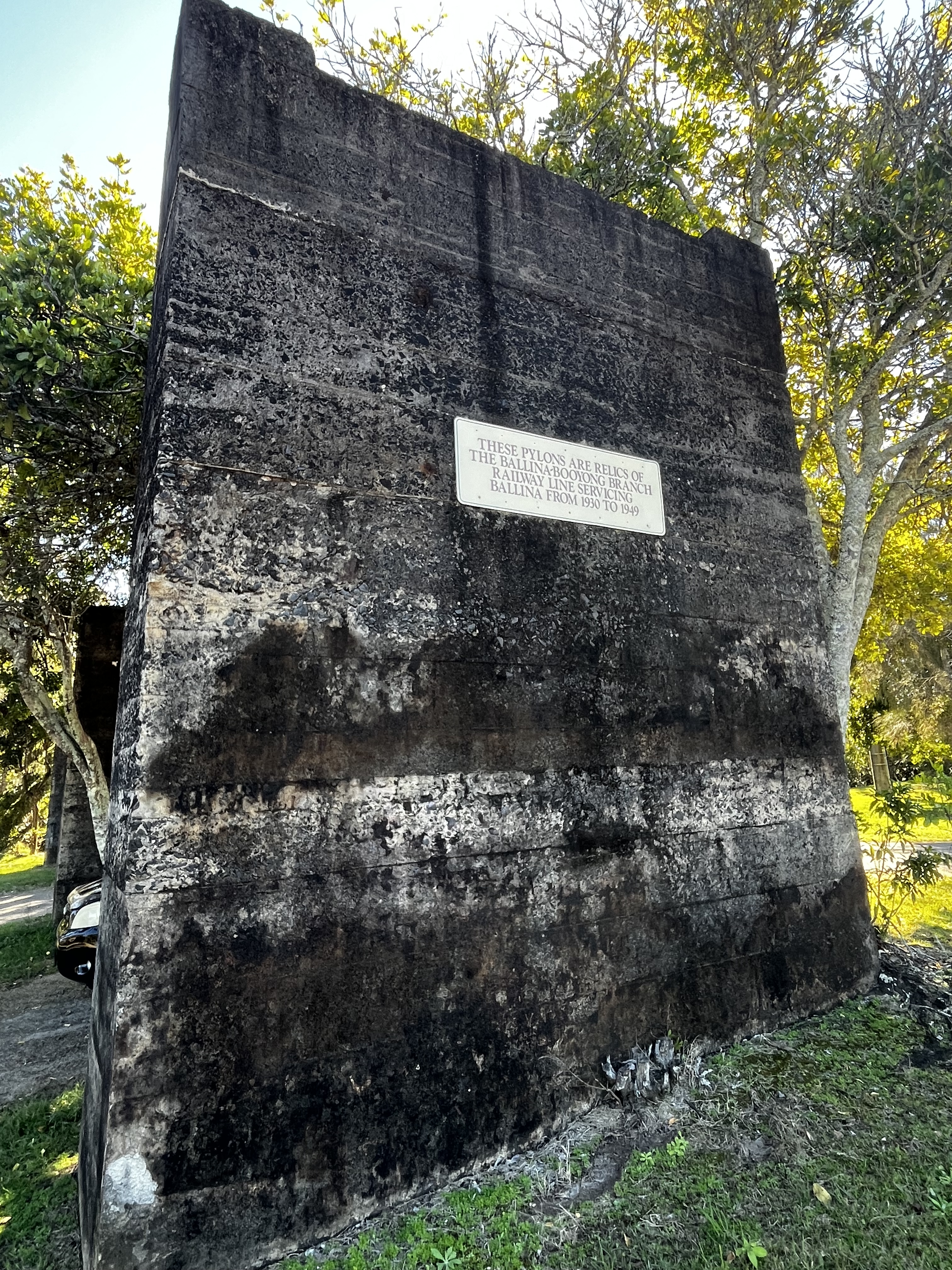
Pylons of the Ballina Branch Railway Line at Ballina

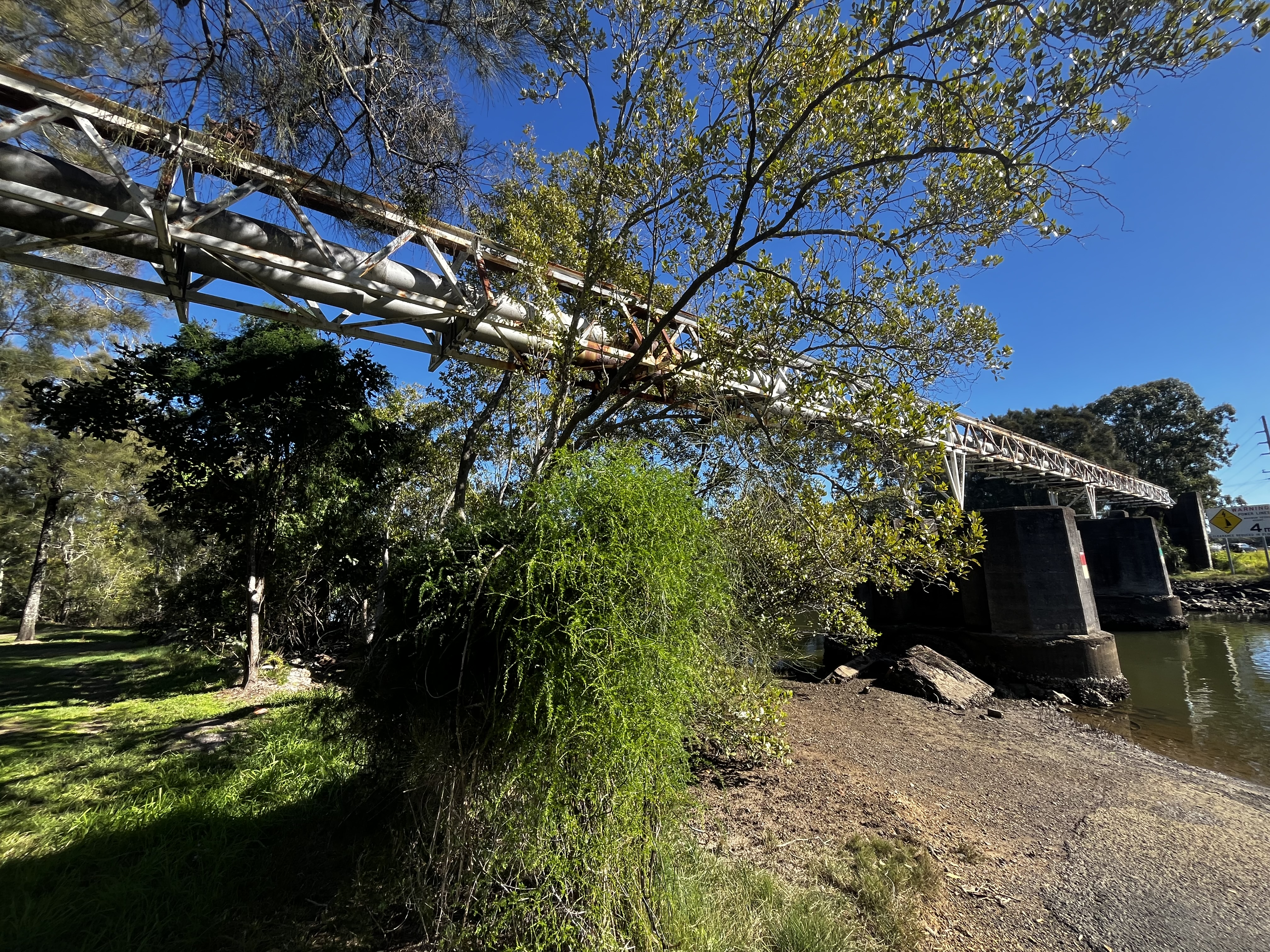
Pylons of the Ballina Branch Railway Line
