= Clunes, New South Wales =

Clunes
- Town
- A view from James Gibson Road, Clunes, 2008

- Coordinates: 28°44′S 153°24′E
- Country: Australia
- State: New South Wales
- Region: Northern Rivers
- LGA: City of Lismore; Byron Shire
- Location: 754 km (469 mi) N of Sydney; 180 km (110 mi) S of Brisbane; 28 km (17 mi) SE of Byron Bay; 18 km (11 mi) NE of Lismore

Government
  - State electorate: Lismore
  - Federal division: Richmond

Population
  - Total: 559 (2011 census)
- Time zone: UTC+10 (AEST)
  - Summer (DST): UTC+11 (AEDT)

Clunes is a small town in the Northern Rivers region of New South Wales, Australia. It is located approximately 20 kilometres (12 mi) northeast of the regional centre of Lismore. In 2011 census, Clunes had a population of 559 people.

It is on the lands of the Widjabal people of the Bundjalung nation who are its traditional owners.

== Description and history ==
Clunes is situated in hilly country and the volcanic soils provided by nearby Mount Warning (Wollumbin) allow for macadamia and coffee-growing.

Clunes was first settled by Europeans in the 1870s following the Robertson Land Act 1861 which allowed for the free selection of crown lands and, by 1883, there were enough children in the area for the creation of Clunes School.

There are a number of theories regarding the origin of the name of Clunes and it is believed to be named for Robert Mortimer Clunes, an early engineer in the local dairying industry, however it is also suggested that the town is named for Archibald Clunes Innes. Notably 'Clunes' is also the Gaelic word for "pleasant place". It is also nicknamed "The Holy City" because of the number of fine early Australian churches in the village. The village retains the nickname to this day due to the large amount of Potholes in the area.

== Gallery ==
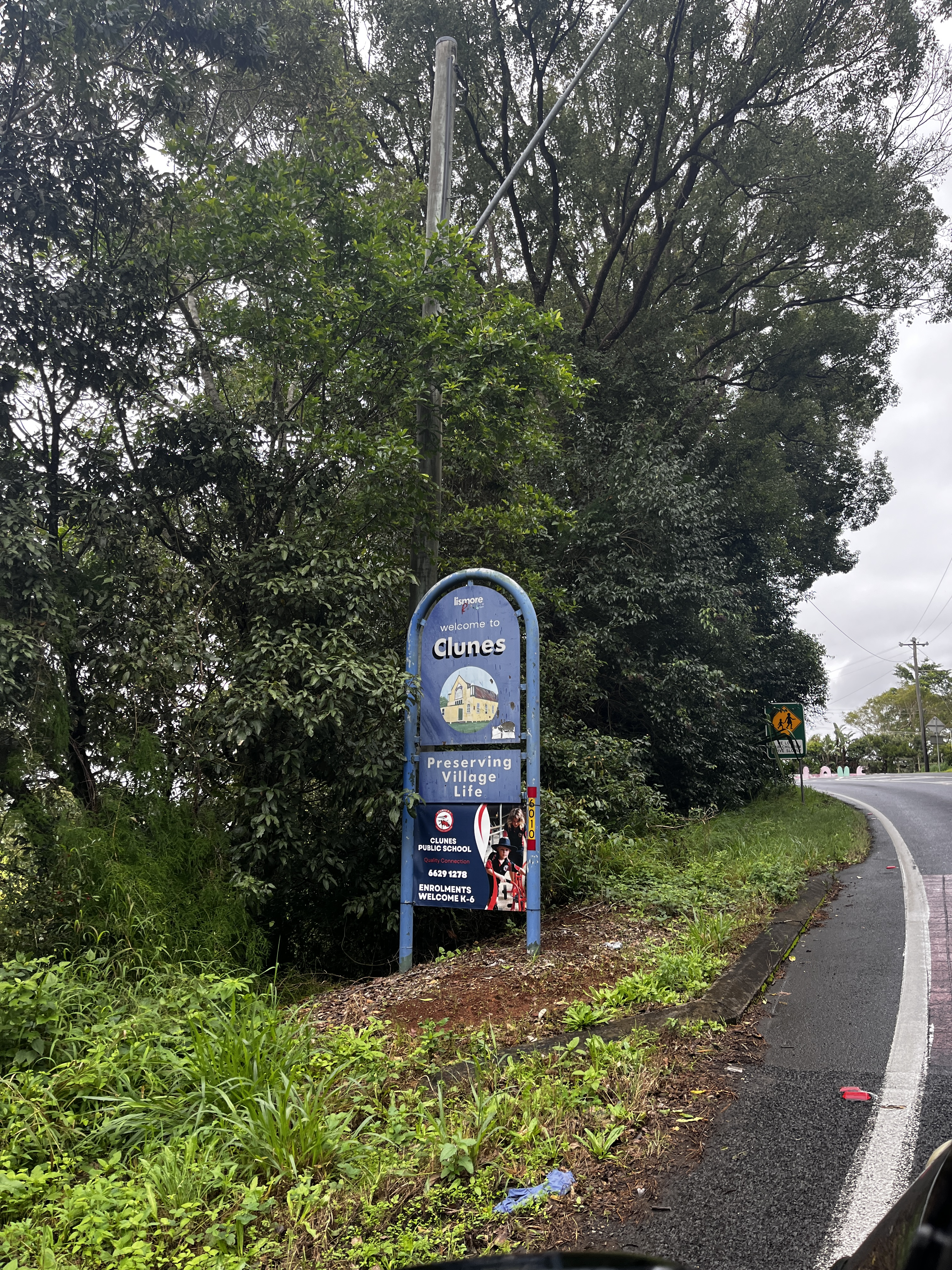
The welcome sign to Clunes, New South Wales, 2025

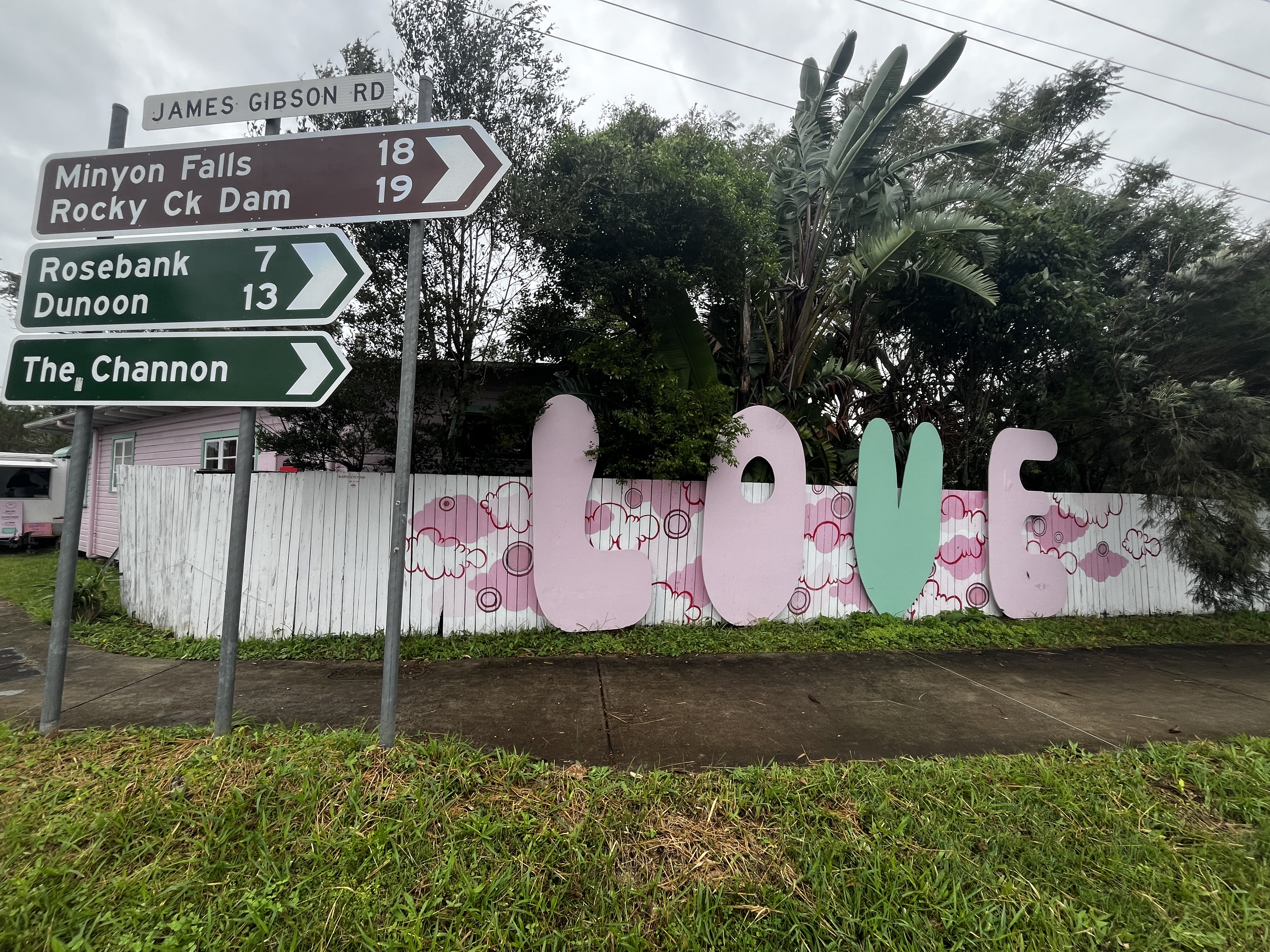
LOVE in Clunes, New South Wales, featuring directional signs to surrounding areas, 2025

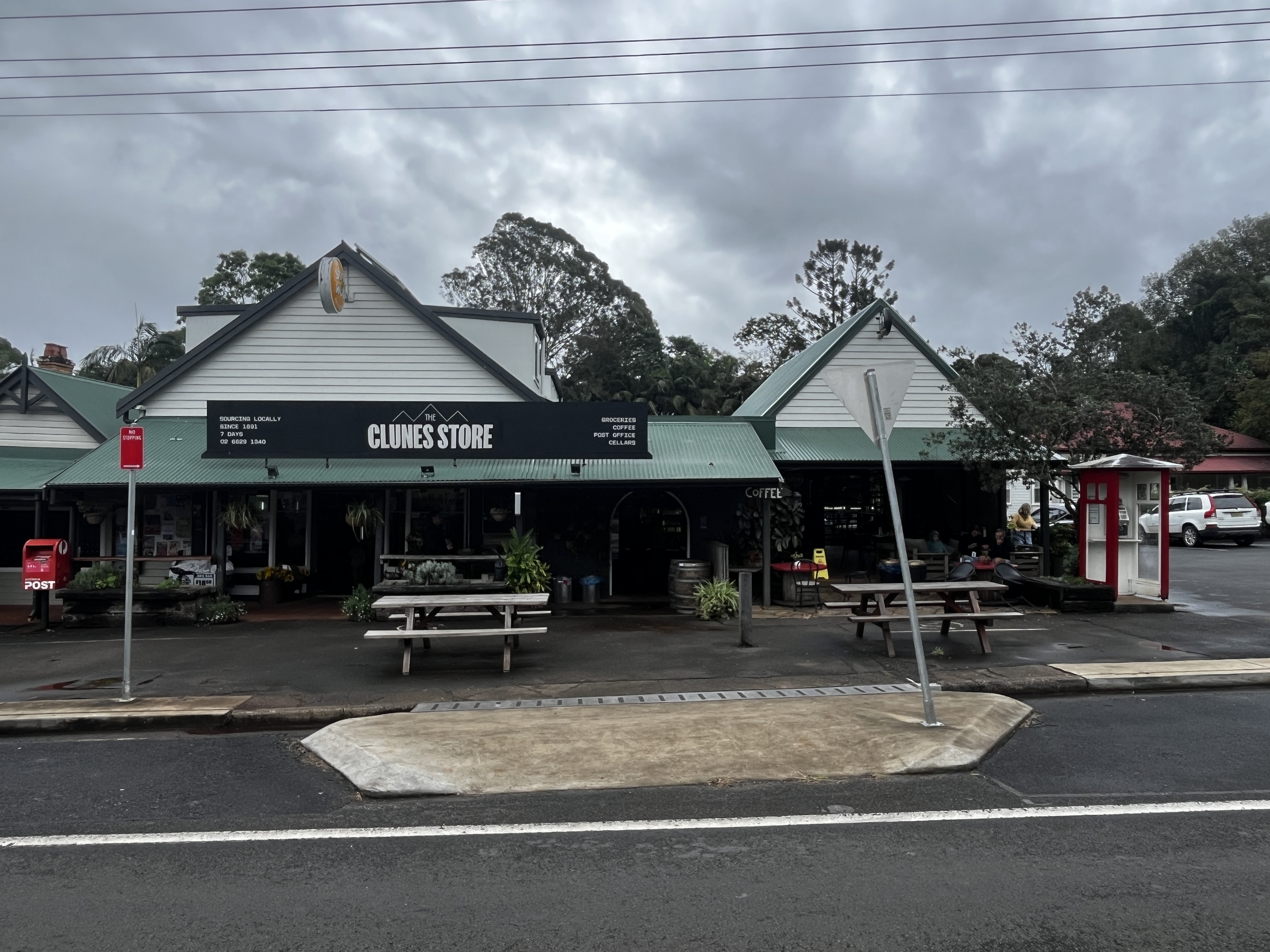
The Clunes Store, 2025

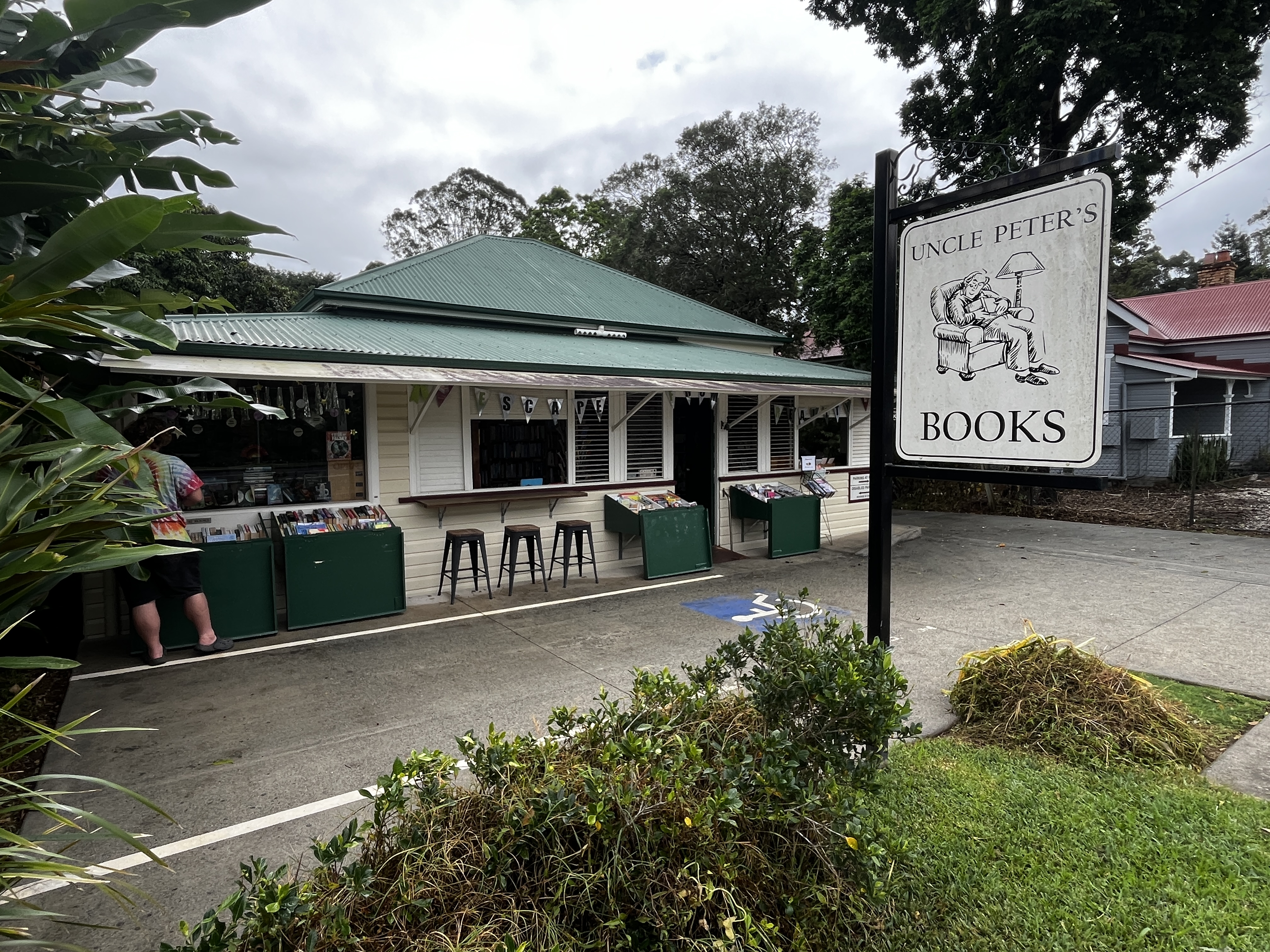
Uncle Peter's Books in Clunes, 2025

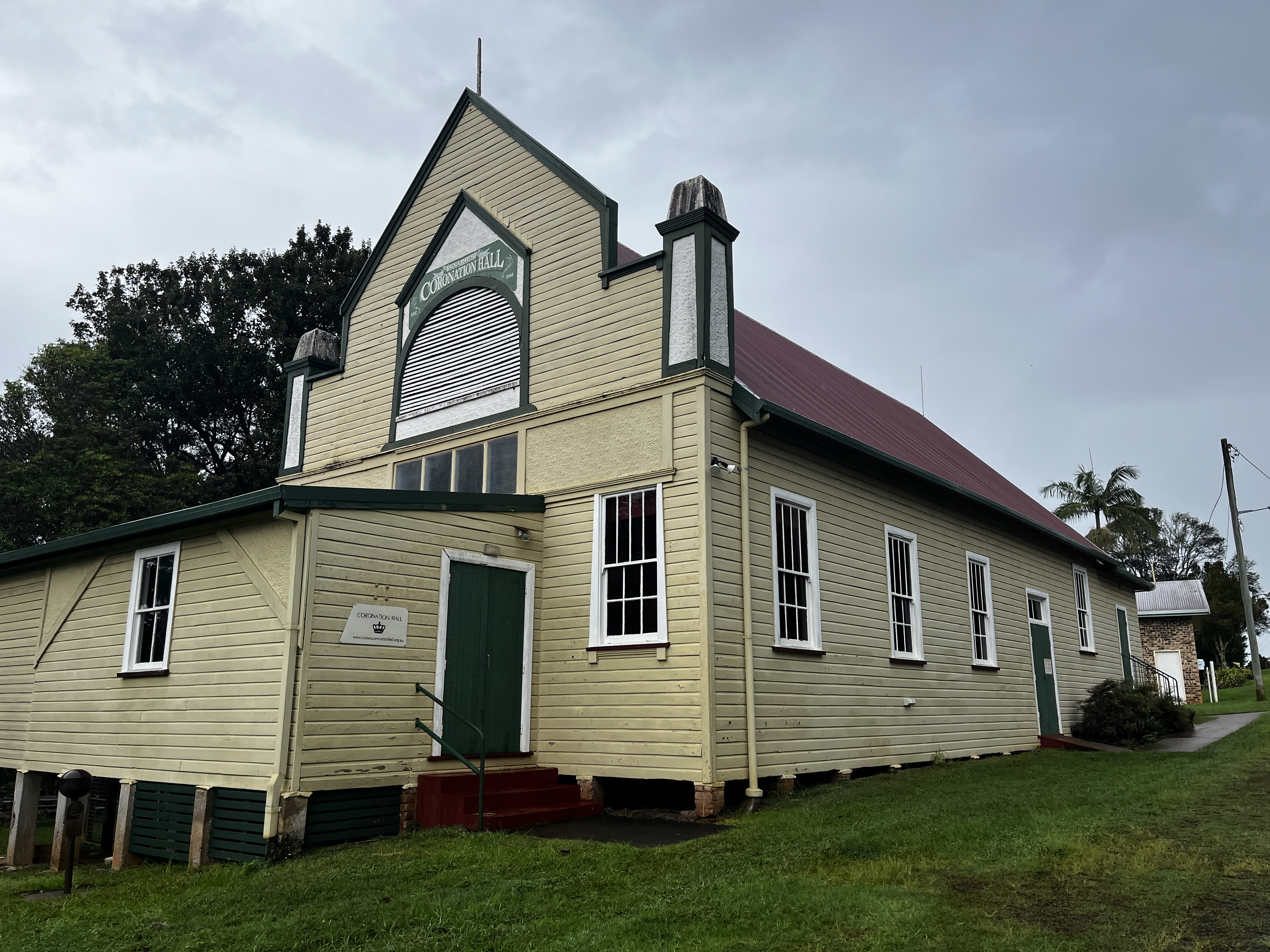
The Coronation Hall in Clunes, 2025

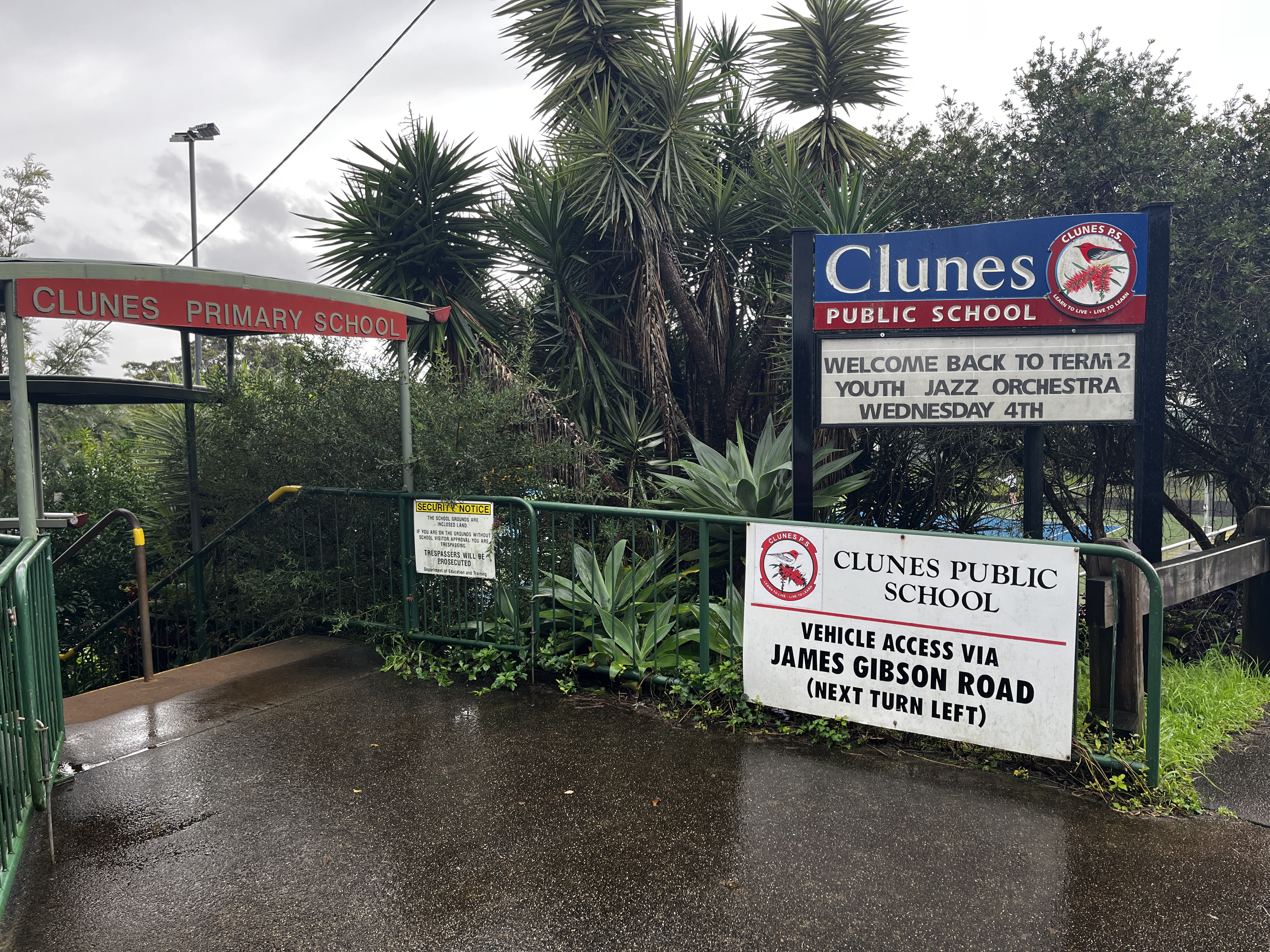
Clunes Public School in Clunes, 2025
