= North Coast Mail =

Former passenger railway service in New South Wales, Australia

Overview
- Service type: Passenger train
- Status: Ceased
- Last service: October 1985
- Former operator: State Rail Authority

Route
- Termini: Sydney; Grafton
- Distance travelled: 696 kilometres (432 mi)
- Service frequency: Once daily in each direction
- Line used: North Coast

The North Coast Mail was an Australian passenger train that ran from Sydney via the North Coast line to Grafton until October 1985.

It ran to Murwillumbah until April 1973 when replaced by the Gold Coast Motorail north of Grafton. It was the last New South Wales train to convey a travelling post office, this ceasing in August 1985.
