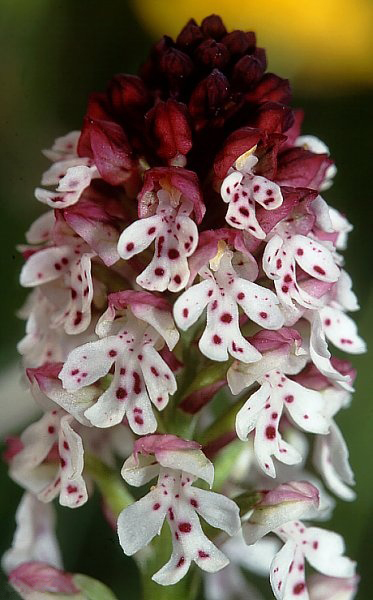

Conservation status
- Least Concern (IUCN 3.1)

Scientific classification
- Kingdom: Plantae
- Clade: Tracheophytes
- Clade: Angiosperms
- Clade: Monocots
- Order: Asparagales
- Family: Orchidaceae
- Subfamily: Orchidoideae
- Genus: Neotinea
- Species: N. ustulata

Binomial name
- Neotinea ustulata (L.) R.M.Bateman, Pridgeon & M.W.Chase

Synonyms
- Orchis ustulata L.

= Neotinea ustulata =

Species of orchid

Neotinea ustulata (syn. Orchis ustulata), the burnt orchid or burnt-tip orchid, is a European terrestrial orchid native to mountains in central and southern Europe, growing at up to 2,400 m (7,900 ft) elevation. The plant is considered Endangered in Great Britain and Least Concern internationally based on IUCN Red List criteria. The burnt-tip orchid was voted the county flower of Wiltshire in 2002 following a poll by the wild flora conservation charity Plantlife.

== Description ==
Neotinea ustulata grows from two spherical tubers with thick roots. Old sources believed that the plant could grow underground for 10–15 years before the first stem appears. Plants have 3 to 9 cm (1.2 to 3.5 in) leaves with prominent veins, along with a couple of leaves typically around the flower stem, which can reach 28 cm (11 in), though typically less than 13 cm (5.1 in) tall.

Flowers are born in a dense cylindrical pattern, with individual plants capable of producing up to 70 flowers. The sepals and petals form a 3 mm (0.12 in) hood that is reddish-brown, over a white crimson-spotted lower lip that is 4 mm (0.16 in). Flowers have a strong fragrance that is described as similar to honey, though flowers do not produce nectar. N. ustulata flowers from May through June, with the subspecies, Neotinea ustulata subsp. aestivalis blooming in July in England. The late flowering subspecies has a different, unpleasant aroma, indicating different pollinators. The common name comes from the tips of the flower buds having a burnt appearance.

Seed set for flowers is low, at around 20%, but each seed capsule may contain 2000-4000 seeds, which are dust-like and travel hundreds of kilometres on the wind.

== Distribution and habitat ==
Neotinea ustulata is distributed throughout central and south Europe, with its main populations in Spain and Greece in the south, reaching England and southern Sweden in the north, and reaching as far east as the Caucasus and Ural mountains. It grows as high as 2,400 m (7,900 ft) elevation in the Carpathian mountains and the Alps. It typically grows on chalky subsoil (occasionally acidic soils) in grassland; fens and open pine forest; mountain meadows, valleys, and ledges; wet grasslands. The plant's largest population in northwest Europe is on Parsonage Down, in Wiltshire, England.

== Ecology ==
The early-flowering subspecies Neotinea ustulata var. ustulata is pollinated by a tachinid parasitic fly Tachina magnicornis. The late-flowering subspecies Neotinea ustulata var. aestivalis is pollinated by the longhorn beetle Pseudovadonia livida and possibly also by bees.

Neotinea ustulata is highly restricted in which species of mycorrhizal fungi it can partner with, relying upon species in the Rhizoctonia group. One study has indicated that partnership with a species of Ceratobasidium also occurs.

As this species is one of the smallest European orchids, it generally relies on low intensity grazing to compete with other plants for light. It is however, not spared by grazers; above ground, plants may be eaten by sheep, cows, rabbits, slugs and snails. Wild boar sometimes dig out the roots of the plant and consume them.

== Etymology ==
The genus Neotinea is named after an Italian botanist, Vincenzo Tineo (1791-1856), who was Director of Palermo botanical garden and later the Chancellor of Palermo University. His published works include 'Plantarum rariorum Sicilae' (1817) and 'Catalogus plantarum horti' (1827). The Latin specific epithet ustulata means "slightly burnt", referring to the appearance of the flower spike, as the common name does.
