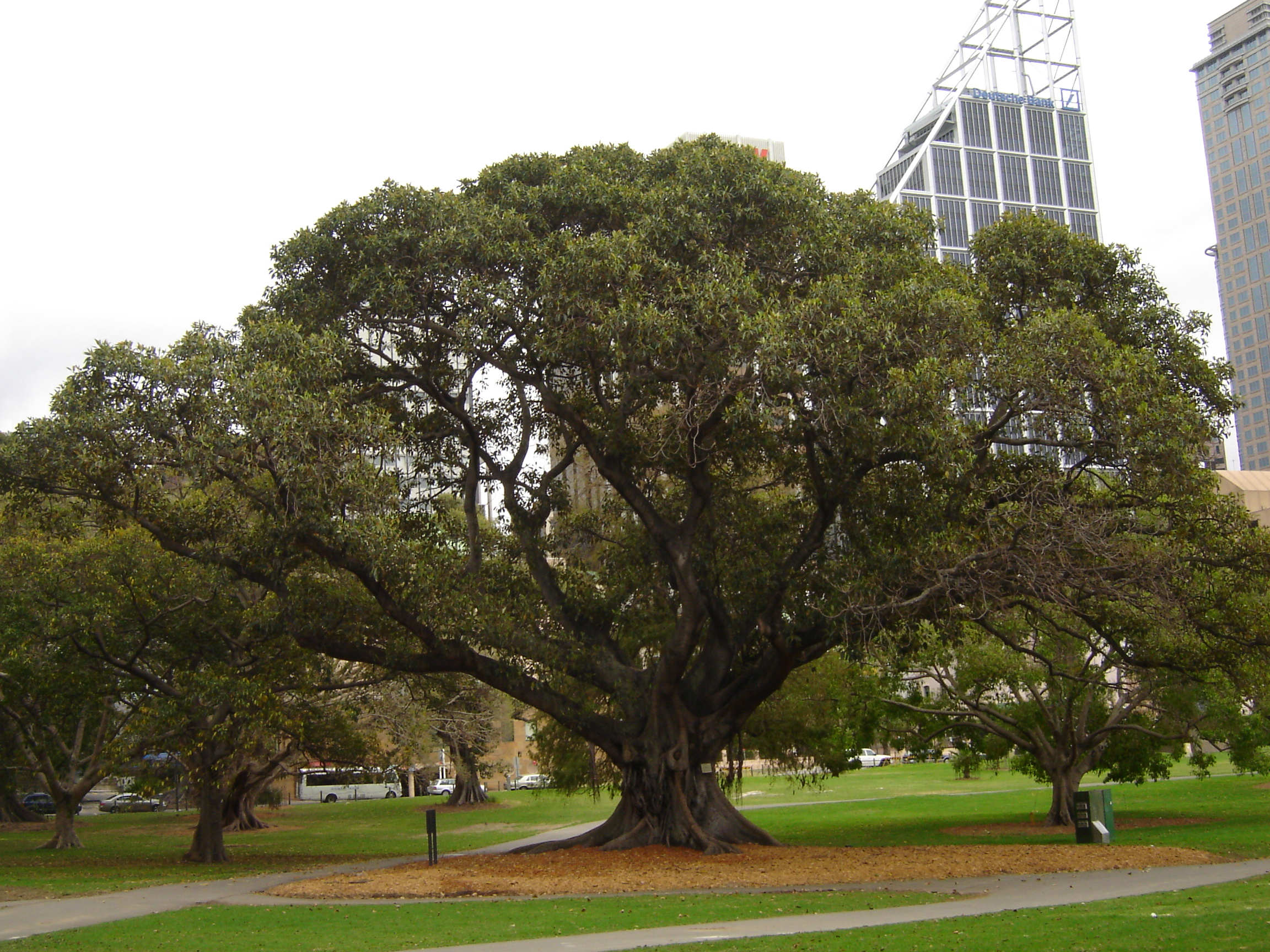
- A specimen at The Domain, Sydney, planted in 1850
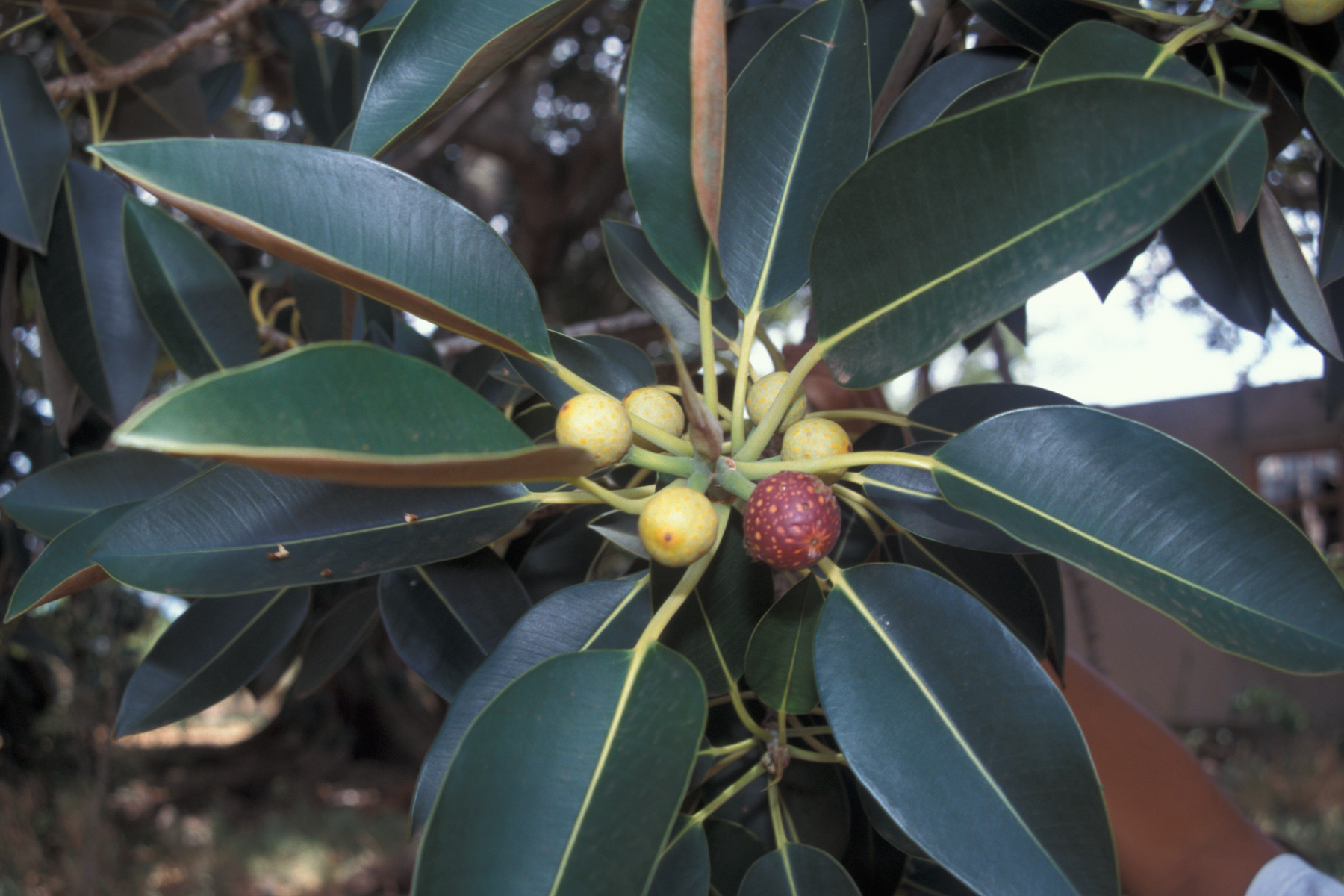
- Fruit and leaves, photographed on Maui, Hawaii

Conservation status
- Least Concern (IUCN 3.1)

Scientific classification
- Kingdom: Plantae
- Clade: Embryophytes
- Clade: Tracheophytes
- Clade: Angiosperms
- Clade: Eudicots
- Clade: Rosids
- Order: Rosales
- Family: Moraceae
- Genus: Ficus
- Subgenus: F. subg. Urostigma
- Species: F. macrophylla

Binomial name
- Ficus macrophylla Pers.

Forms
- Ficus macrophylla f. columnaris (C.Moore) D.J.Dixon; Ficus macrophylla f. macrophylla
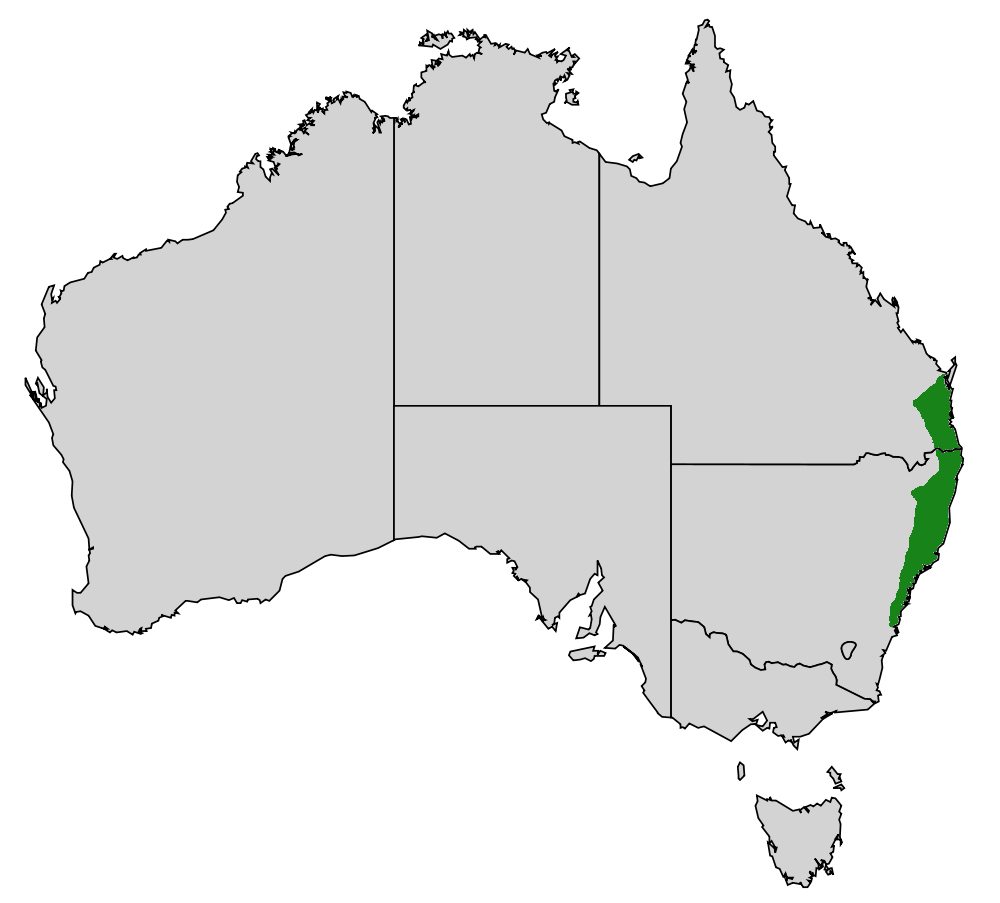
- Natural range in Eastern Australia (in green)

Synonyms
- Urostigma macrophyllum (Pers.) Miq.; synonyms of f. columnaris: Ficus columnaris C.Moore; Ficus macrophylla subsp. columnaris (C.Moore) P.S.Green; synonyms of f. macrophylla: Ficus angladei C.E.C.Fisch.; Ficus huegelii Kunth & C.D.Bouche; Ficus macrocarpa Hügel ex Miq., not validly publ.; Ficus macrophylla f. stenophylla Domin; Ficus magnolioides Antonino Borzì; Ficus squamellosa (Miq.) Miq.; Urostigma huegelii (Kunth & C.D.Bouché) Miq.; Urostigma platypodum f. major Miq.; Urostigma squamellosum Miq.

= Ficus macrophylla =

Moreton Bay fig

Species of banyan tree

Ficus macrophylla, commonly known as the Moreton Bay fig or Australian banyan, is a large evergreen banyan tree of the mulberry and fig family Moraceae. It is native to eastern Australia, from the Wide Bay–Burnett region of Queensland in the north to the Illawarra region of New South Wales. The infraspecies Ficus macrophylla f. columnaris is endemic to Lord Howe Island. Its common name refers to Moreton Bay in Queensland. It is best known for its imposing buttress roots.

Ficus macrophylla is called a strangler fig because seed germination usually takes place in the canopy of a host tree, where the seedling lives as an epiphyte until its roots establish contact with the ground, when it enlarges and strangles its host, eventually becoming a freestanding tree by itself. Individuals may reach 60 m (200 ft) in height. The greatest exact height to be reported is 70.6 m (232 ft). It has an obligate mutualism with fig wasps; figs are pollinated only by fig wasps, and fig wasps can reproduce only in fig flowers. The wasp partner of the Moreton Bay fig is Pleistodontes froggattii. Many species of birds, including pigeons, parrots, and various passerines, eat the fruit.

Ficus macrophylla is widely used as a feature tree in public parks and gardens in warmer climates such as California, Spain, Portugal, Italy, Malta, northern New Zealand (Auckland), and Australia. Old specimens can reach tremendous size, and their aggressive root system renders them unsuitable for all but the largest private gardens.

== Description ==
Ficus macrophylla is an evergreen tree that can reach heights of 60 m (200 ft). The trunk can be massive, with thick, prominent buttressing, and reach a diameter of 2.4 m (7.9 ft). The rough bark is grey-brown, and marked with various blemishes. The Lord Howe form of Moreton Bay fig has a habit of dropping aerial roots from its branches, which upon reaching the ground, thicken into supplementary trunks which help to support the weight of its crown.

The leaves and branches bleed a milky sap if cut or broken. The figs are 2–2.5 cm (0.8–1 in) in diameter, turning from green to purple with lighter spots as they ripen; ripe fruit may be found year-round, although they are more abundant from February to May. It is a rainforest plant and in this environment more often grows in the form of an epiphytic strangler vine than that of a tree. When its seeds land in the branch of a host tree it sends aerial, "strangler" roots down the host trunk, eventually killing the host and standing alone. It is monoecious: each tree bears functional male and female flowers. As indicated by its specific epithet, it has large, elliptic, leathery, dark green leaves, 15–30 cm (6–12 in) long, and they are arranged alternately on the stems. The fruit is known as a syconium, an inverted inflorescence with the flowers lining an internal cavity.

== Taxonomy ==
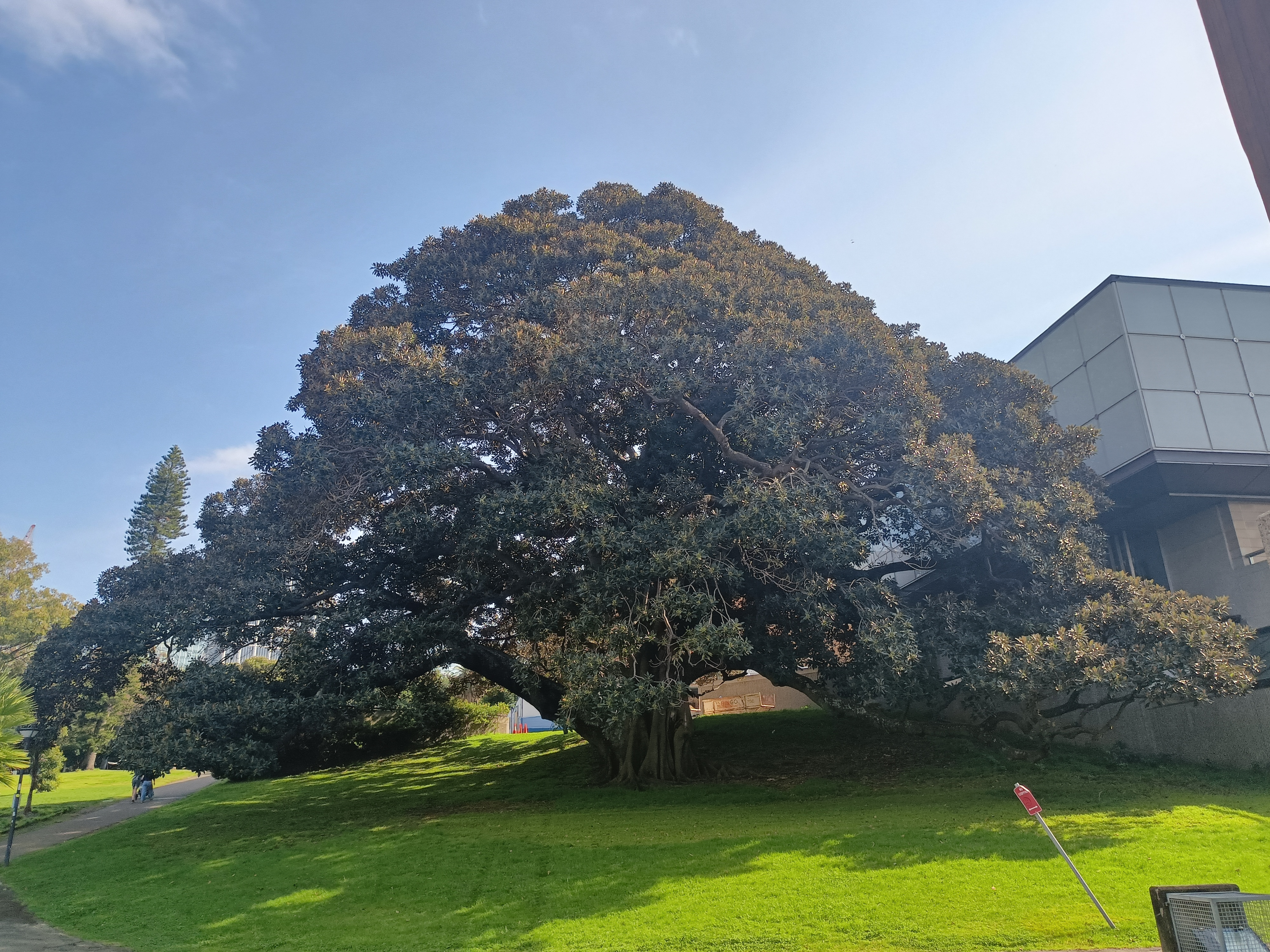
Ficus macrophylla in The Domain, Sydney. 2024

South African botanist Christiaan Hendrik Persoon published a formal description of the Moreton Bay fig in his 1807 work Synopsis Plantarum, the material having been reported by French botanist René Louiche Desfontaines in 1804. The type specimen has been lost but was possibly located in Florence. The specific epithet macrophylla is derived from the Ancient Greek makros "large" and phyllon "leaf", and refers to the size of the leaves. In the early 19th century, Italian botanist Vincenzo Tineo of the Orto botanico di Palermo in Sicily obtained a plant from a French nursery that grew to a prodigious size with a banyan habit. This form was propagated and grown in gardens around Sicily. A later director of the gardens, Antonino Borzì, described it as Ficus magnolioides in 1897, distinguishing it from F. macrophylla on account of its larger leaves with greener undersides. This name was widely used in Europe.

Australian botanist Charles Moore described Ficus columnaris in 1870 from material collected from Lord Howe Island, choosing the species name from the Latin columnaris for the column-like roots. English botanist E. J. H. Corner reduced this to synonymy with F. macrophylla in 1965, before P. S. Green noted it was distinct enough for subspecies status in 1986. Australian botanist Dale J. Dixon reviewed material and felt the differences too minor to warrant subspecific status, and recognised two forms: Ficus macrophylla f. macrophylla, a free-standing tree endemic to mainland Australia; and Ficus macrophylla f. columnaris, a hemiepiphyte lacking a distinct main trunk and endemic to Lord Howe Island. Review of F. magnolioides by Silvio Fici and Francesco Maria Raimondo found that it was F. macrophylla f. columnaris.

The species is commonly known as the Moreton Bay fig, after Moreton Bay in southern Queensland, although it is found elsewhere. An alternate name—black fig—is derived from the dark colour of the ageing bark.

With over 750 species, Ficus is one of the largest angiosperm genera. Based on morphology, Corner divided the genus into four subgenera; later expanded to six. In this classification, the Moreton Bay fig was placed in subseries Malvanthereae, series Malvanthereae, section Malvanthera of the subgenus Urostigma. In his reclassification of the Australian Malvanthera, Dixon altered the delimitations of the series within the section but left this species in series Malvanthereae.

In 2005, Dutch botanist Cornelis Berg completed Corner's treatment of the Moraceae for the Flora Malesiana; the completion of that work had been delayed since 1972 as a result of disagreements between Corner and C. J. J. G. van Steenis, editor of the Flora Malesiana. Berg combined sections Stilpnophyllum and Malvanthera into an expanded section Stilpnophyllum. This left the Moreton Bay fig in subsection Malvanthera, section Stilpnophyllum.

In a 2008 study on DNA sequences from the nuclear ribosomal internal and external transcribed spacers, Danish botanist Nina Rønsted and colleagues rejected previous subdivisions of the Malvanthera. Instead, they divided section Malvanthera into three subsections—Malvantherae, Platypodeae, and Hesperidiiformes. In this system, the Moreton Bay fig is in the subsection Malvantherae, along with F. pleurocarpa. The Malvantherae appear to be basal (an early offshoot) to the group. F. macrophylla form macrophylla is native to mainland Australia, while form columnaris of macrophylla colonised Lord Howe Island. The section Malvanthera itself is thought to have evolved 41 million years ago and radiated around 35 million years ago.

== Distribution and habitat ==
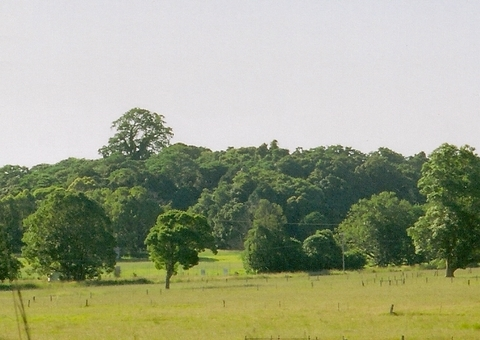
Emergent Moreton Bay fig in situ, estimated 50 metres tall, Davis Scrub Nature Reserve, Australia

The Moreton Bay fig is a native of eastern coastal Australia, from the Wide Bay–Burnett region in central Queensland, to the Shoalhaven River on the New South Wales south coast. It is found in subtropical, warm temperate, and dry rainforest, where, as an emergent tree, its crown may tower above the canopy, particularly along watercourses on alluvial soils. In the Sydney region, F. macrophylla grows from sea level to 300 metres (980 feet) altitude, in areas with an average yearly rainfall of 1,200–1,800 mm (47–71 in).

It often grows with trees such as white booyong (Argyrodendron trifoliolatum), Flindersia species, giant stinging tree (Dendrocnide excelsa), lacebark (Brachychiton discolor), red cedar (Toona ciliata), hoop pine (Araucaria cunninghamii), green-leaved fig (Ficus watkinsiana) and Cryptocarya obovata. The soils it grows on are high in nutrients and include Bumbo Latite and Budgong Sandstone. As rainforests were cleared, isolated specimens were left standing in fields as remnant trees, valued for their shade and shelter for livestock. One such tree was a landmark for and gave its name to the Wollongong suburb of Figtree in New South Wales.

== Ecology ==
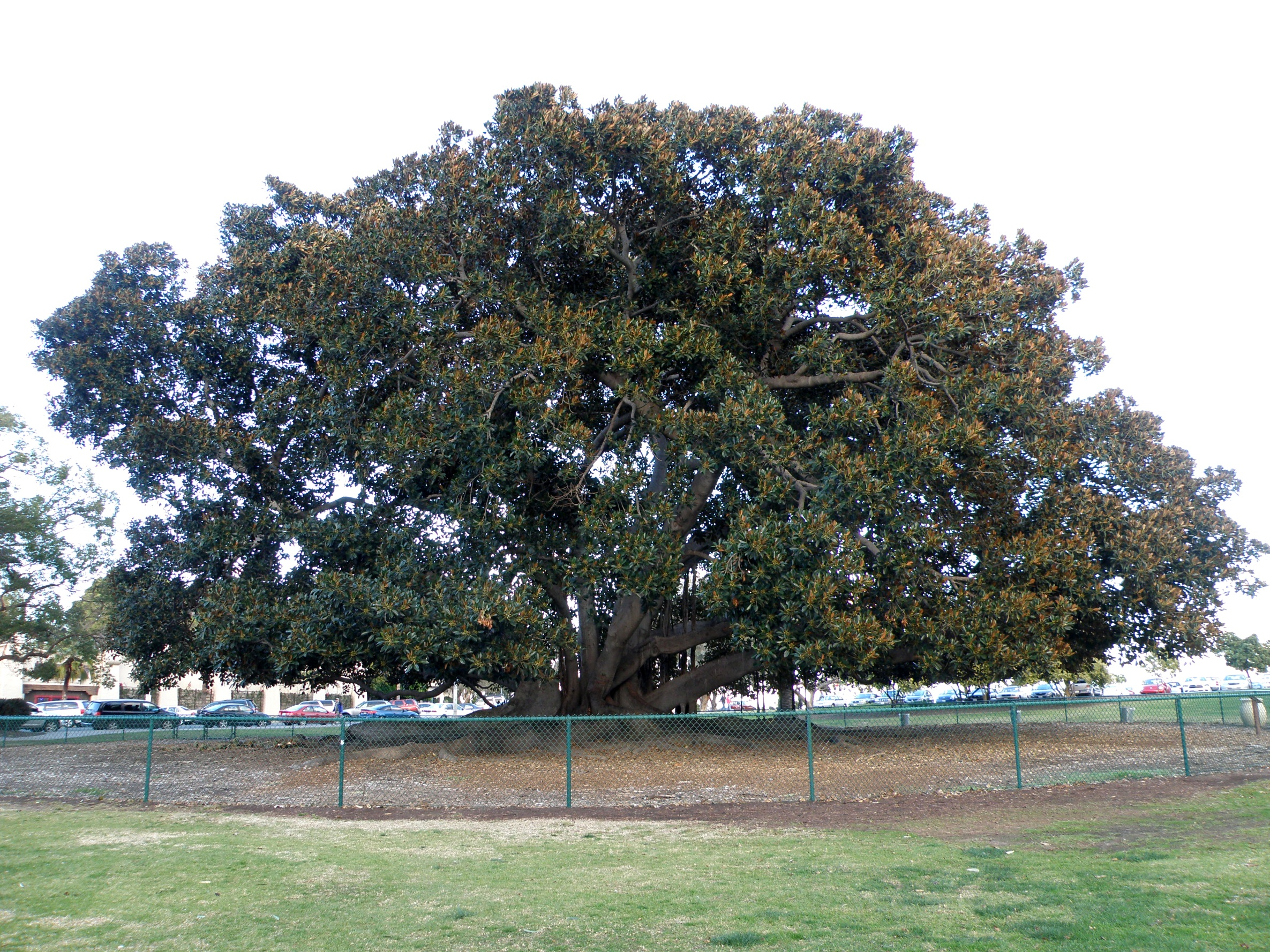
Large Moreton Bay fig tree in Balboa Park, San Diego

The huge numbers of fruit produced by the Moreton Bay fig make it a key source of food in the rainforest. It is an important food to the green catbird (Ailuroedus crassirostris), as well as fruit-eating pigeons such as the wompoo fruit-dove (Ptilinopus magnificus), and topknot pigeon (Lopholaimus antarcticus), and a sometime food of the rose-crowned fruit-dove (Ptilinopus regina). Other bird species that eat the fruit include the yellow-eyed cuckoo-shrike (Coracina lineata), pied currawong (Strepera graculina), Australasian figbird (Sphecotheres vieilloti), Regent bowerbird (Sericulus chrysocephalus), satin bowerbird (Ptilonorhynchus violaceus), and Lewin's honeyeater (Meliphaga lewinii). Fruit bats such as the grey-headed flying-fox (Pteropus poliocephalus) also feed on the fruit. As well as the pollinating fig wasp, Pleistodontes froggatti, syconia of the Moreton Bay fig are host to several species of non-pollinating chalcidoid wasps including Sycoscapter australis (Pteromalidae), Eukobelea hallami (Sycophaginae), and Meselatus sp. (Epichrysomallinae). The nematode species Schistonchus macrophylla and Schistonchus altermacrophylla are found in the syconia, where they parasitise P. froggattii.

The thrips species Gynaikothrips australis feeds on the underside of new leaves of F. macrophylla, as well as those of F. rubiginosa and F. obliqua. As plant cells die, nearby cells are induced into forming meristem tissue and a gall results and the leaves become distorted and curl over. The thrips begin feeding when the tree has flushes of new growth, and the life cycle is around six weeks. At other times, thrips reside on old leaves without feeding. The species pupates sheltered in the bark. The thrips remain in the galls at night and wander about in the daytime and return in the evening, possibly to different galls about the tree.

Stressed trees can also be attacked by psyllids to the point of defoliation. Grubs hatch from eggs laid on the edges of leaves and burrow into the leaf to suck nutrients, the tree's latex shielding the insect. Caterpillars of the moth species Lactura caminaea (Lacturidae) can strip trees of their leaves. The tree is also a host for the longhorn beetle (Cerambycidae) species Agrianome spinicollis. The fungal pathogen brown root rot (Phellinus noxius) has infected and killed this species.

=== Reproduction and life span ===
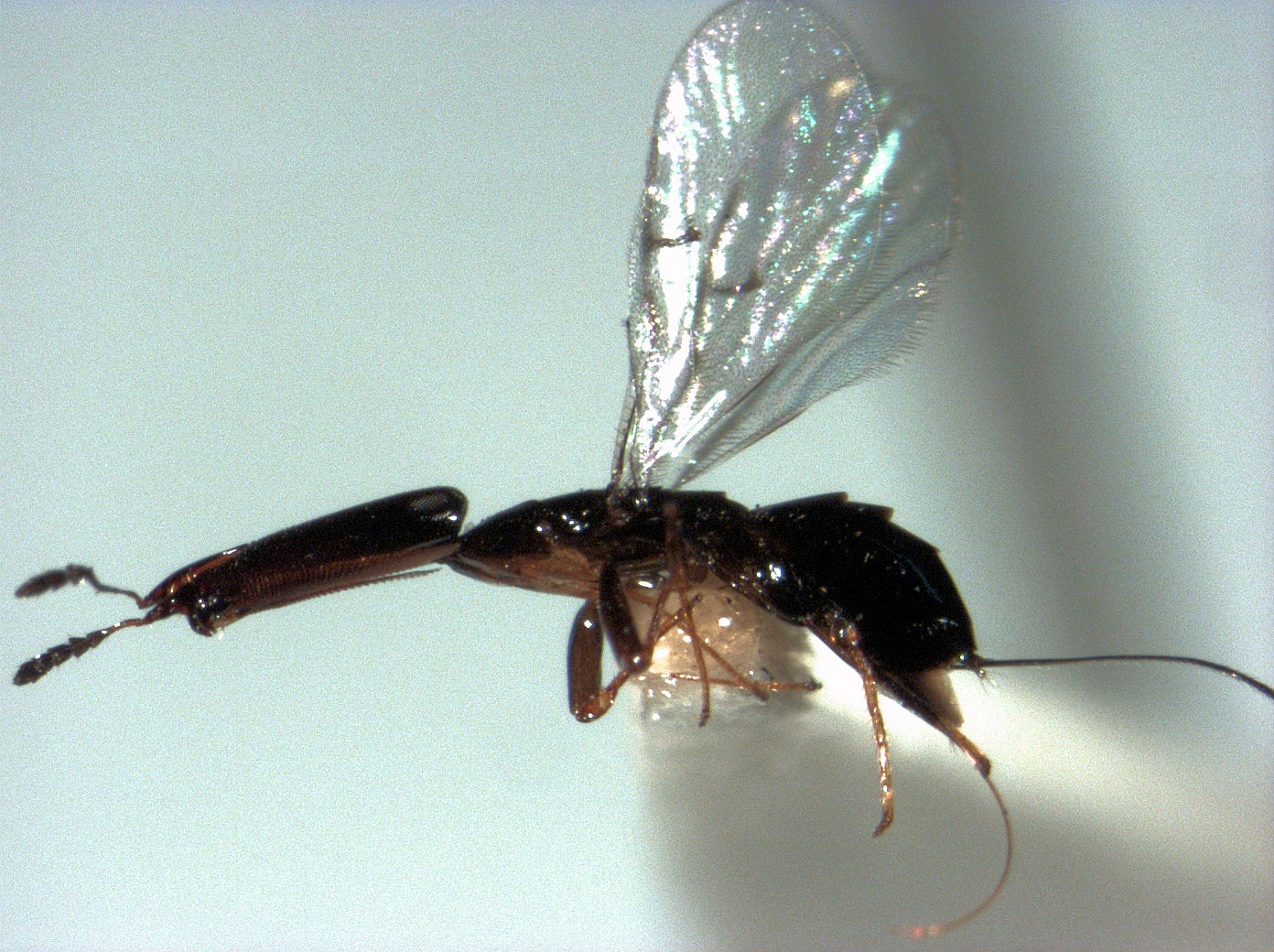
Pleistodontes froggatti, the fig wasp that pollinates the Moreton Bay fig

Figs have an obligate mutualism with fig wasps (Agaonidae); figs are pollinated only by fig wasps, and fig wasps can reproduce only in fig flowers. Generally, each fig species depends on a single species of wasp for pollination. The wasps are similarly dependent on their fig species to reproduce. The mainland and Lord Howe populations of the Moreton Bay fig are both pollinated by Pleistodontes froggatti.

As is the case with all figs, the fruit is an inverted inflorescence known as a syconium, with tiny flowers arising from the inner surface. Ficus macrophylla is monoecious—both male and female flowers are found on the same plant, and, in fact, in the same fruit, although they mature at different times. Female wasps enter the syconium and lay eggs in the female flowers as they mature. These eggs later hatch and the progeny mate. The females of the new generation collect pollen from the male flowers, which have matured by this point, and leave to visit other syconia and repeat the process. A field study in Brisbane found that F. macrophylla trees often bore both male and female syconia at the same time—which could be beneficial for reproduction in small, isolated populations such as those on islands. The same study found that male phase syconia development persisted through the winter, showing that its wasp pollinator tolerated cooler weather than those of more tropical fig species. F. macrophylla itself can endure cooler climates than other fig species. Moreton Bay fig trees live for over 100 years in the wild.

=== Potentially invasive species ===
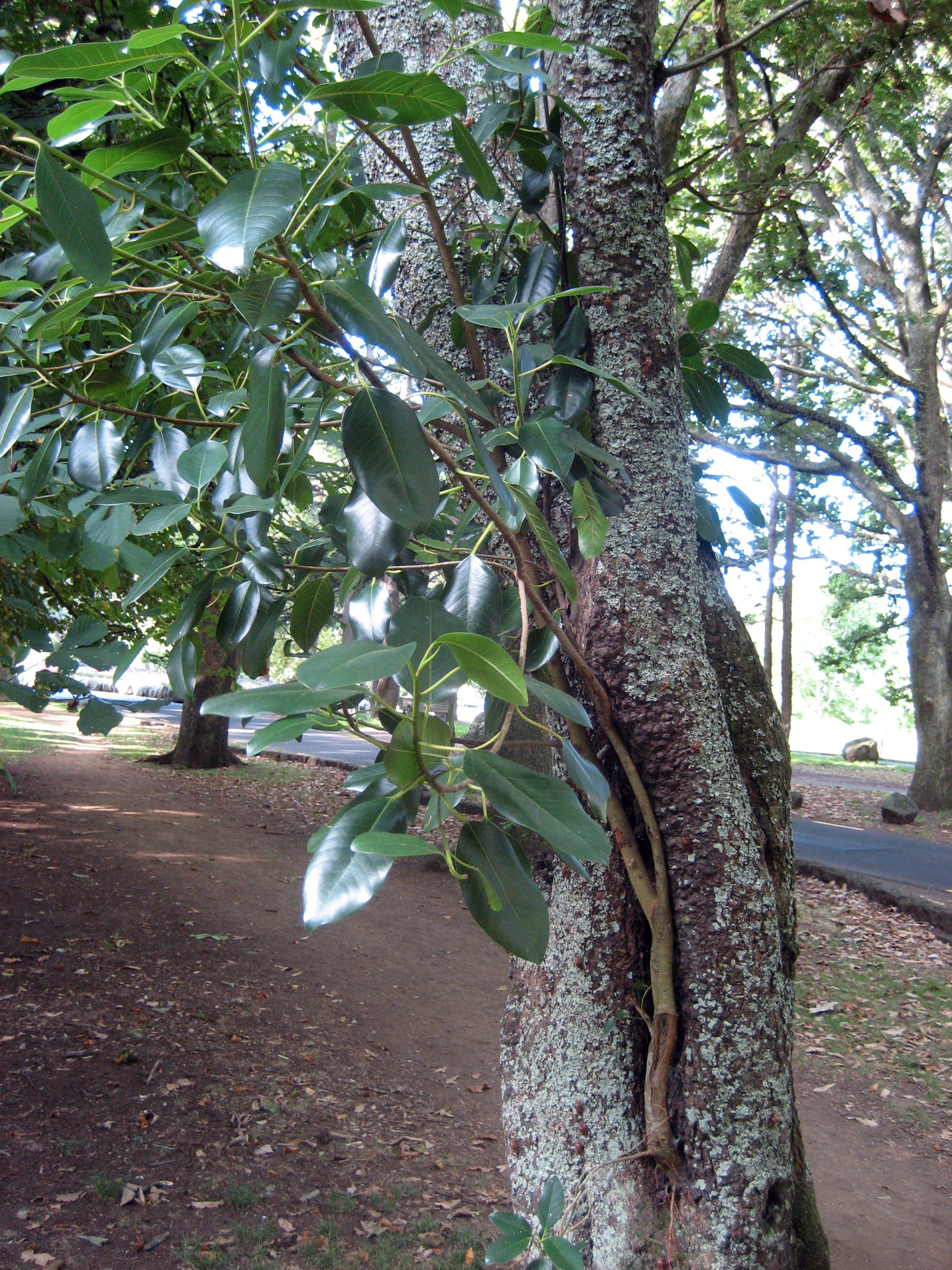
A young Moreton Bay fig starts life as an epiphyte in an Auckland, New Zealand, park

Ficus macrophylla is commonly cultivated in Hawaii and northern New Zealand. In both places, it has now naturalised, having acquired its pollinating wasp (Pleistodontes froggatti). In Hawaii, the wasp was deliberately introduced in 1921, and in New Zealand it was first recorded in 1993, having arrived by long-distance dispersal from Australia. The arrival of the wasp led to prolific production of fruits containing many small seeds adapted for dispersal by birds. The Moreton Bay fig has been found growing on both native and introduced trees in New Zealand and Hawaii. The size and vigour of this fig in New Zealand, and its lack of natural enemies, as well as its immunity to possum browsing, indicate that it may be able to invade forest and other native plant communities. Occasional garden escapees have been recorded in Turkey.

== Cultivation ==
The Moreton Bay fig has been widely used in public parks in frost-free areas, and was popular with early settlers of Australia. Around the beginning of the 20th century, the director of the Royal Botanic Gardens in Sydney, Joseph Maiden, advocated the planting of street trees, generally uniform rows of the one species. He recommended Moreton Bay figs be spaced at 30 m (100 ft) intervals—far enough to avoid crowding as the trees matured, but close enough so that their branches would eventually interlock. Specimens can reach massive proportions, and have thrived in drier climates; impressive specimen trees have been grown in the Waring Gardens in Deniliquin, and Hay. They can withstand light frosts and can cope with salt-laden spray in coastal situations, and their fruit is beneficial for urban wildlife. However, their huge size precludes use in all but the largest gardens, and their roots are highly invasive and can damage piping and disrupt footpaths and roadways; the vast quantities of crushed fruit can be messy on the ground.

Especially due to their tendency for root buttressing, they are frequently seen as bonsai, although they are much more suited to larger styles as their large leaves do not reduce much in size and their stems have long intervals (internodal spaces) between successive leaves. It can be used as an indoor plant in medium to brightly lit indoor spaces.

=== Notable specimens ===
Large specimens of Moreton Bay fig trees are found in many parks and properties throughout eastern and northeastern Australia. The Brisbane, Melbourne, and Sydney botanic gardens contain numerous specimens planted in the middle of the 19th century, which are up to 35 metres (115 ft) tall. At Mount Keira, near Wollongong there is a Moreton Bay fig measured at 58 metres (190 ft) tall. A notable tree in the Sydney suburb of Randwick, the 150-year-old "Tree of Knowledge", was controversially cut down in 2016 to make way for the CBD and South East Light Rail. There are many large specimens in New Zealand. A Moreton Bay fig at Pahi on the Kaipara Harbour, Northland, was measured in 1984 as 26.5 metres (87 ft) high and 48.5 metres (159 ft) wide, and in 2011 had a girth of 14.8 metres (49 ft).

The Moreton Bay fig was introduced into cultivation in California in the United States in the 1870s, 13 specimens being classified as Exceptional Trees of Los Angeles in 1980. The tallest Ficus macrophylla in North America is adjacent to San Diego's Natural History Museum and was planted in 1914. By 1996 it stood 23.7 metres (78 ft) high and the crown was 37.4 metres (123 ft) wide. The widest Moreton Bay fig in North America is Santa Barbara's Moreton Bay Fig Tree. It was planted in 1876, reportedly by a young girl who was given a seedling by an Australian sailor. It measures 53 metres (175 ft) across. The Aoyama Tree stands between the Japanese American National Museum and the Temporary Contemporary in downtown Los Angeles. It was planted by Buddhist Japanese Americans in the early 20th century.

Two South African specimens, in the Arderne Gardens in Claremont and the Pretoria Zoo respectively, have the widest and second-widest canopies of any single-stemmed trees in the country. The Pretoria specimen was planted before 1899, and was 27 metres (89 ft) tall with a canopy width of 43.1 metres (141 ft) by 2012. There is a notable specimen sprawling on steps at the Botanical Garden of the University of Coimbra, Portugal. Ficus macrophylla has been used in public spaces in Palermo in Sicily, with impressive specimens found in the Orto Botanico, the gardens of the Villa Garibaldi, Giardino Inglese, and in some squares.

== Uses ==
The soft light timber has a wavy texture and is used for cases. Aboriginal people traditionally use the fibres for fishing nets. The fruits are edible and taste like other fig varieties.

== Gallery ==
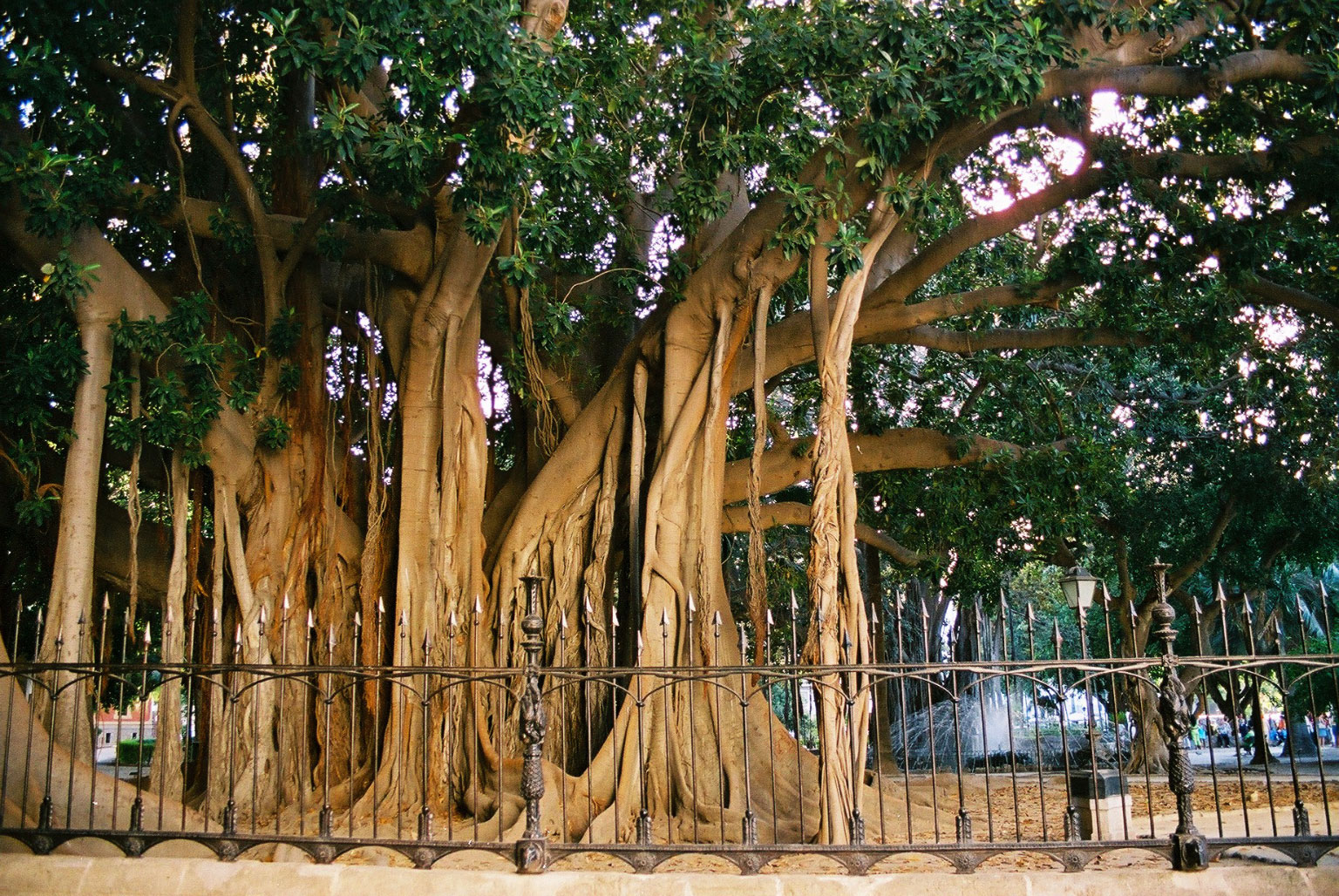
A specimen in Piazza Marina (Palermo), one of the largest in Europe. The aerial roots thicken into columns after reaching the ground.

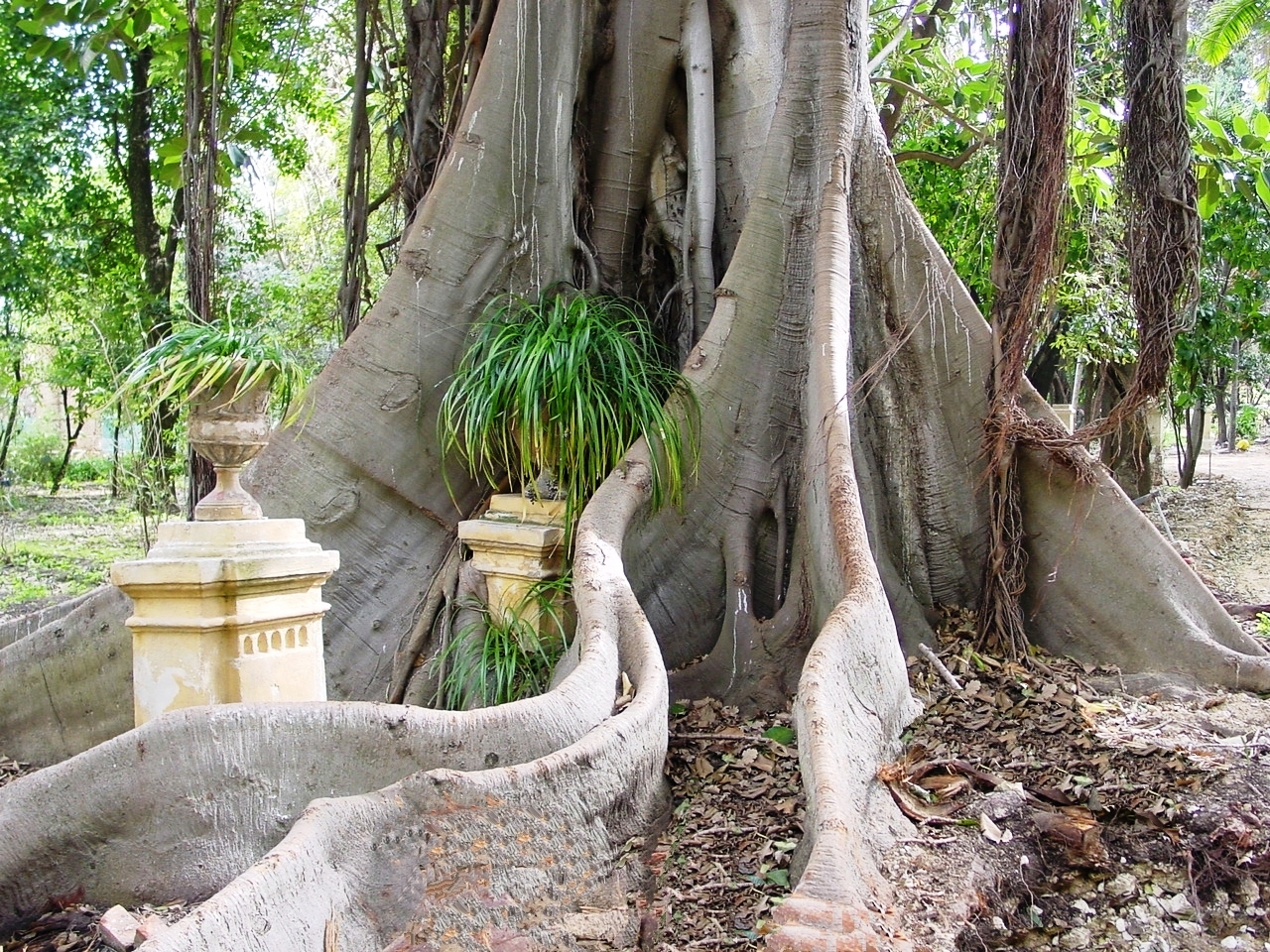
Trunk of F. macrophylla at Orto botanico di Palermo, showing buttressed roots

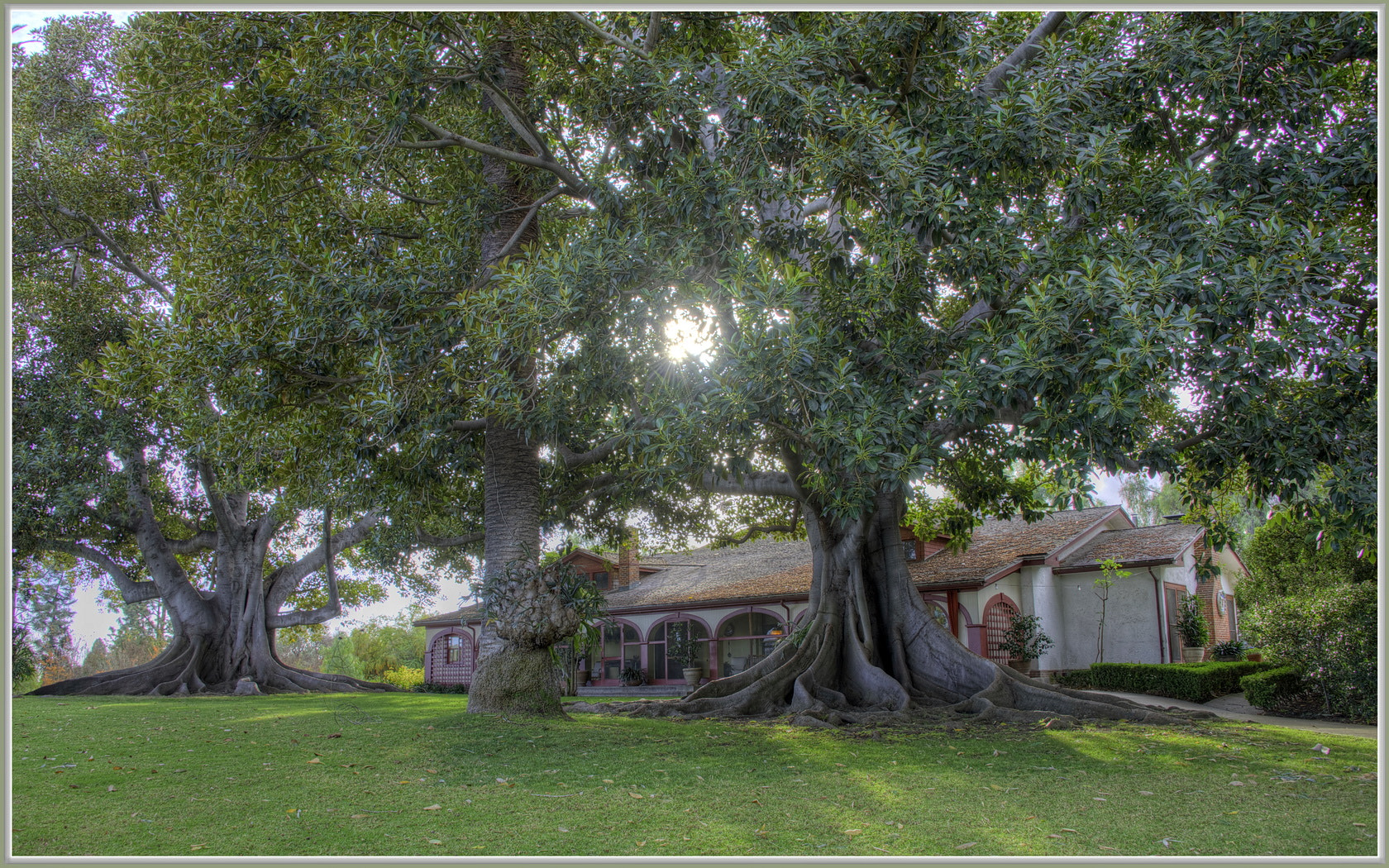
Trees at Rancho Los Alamitos

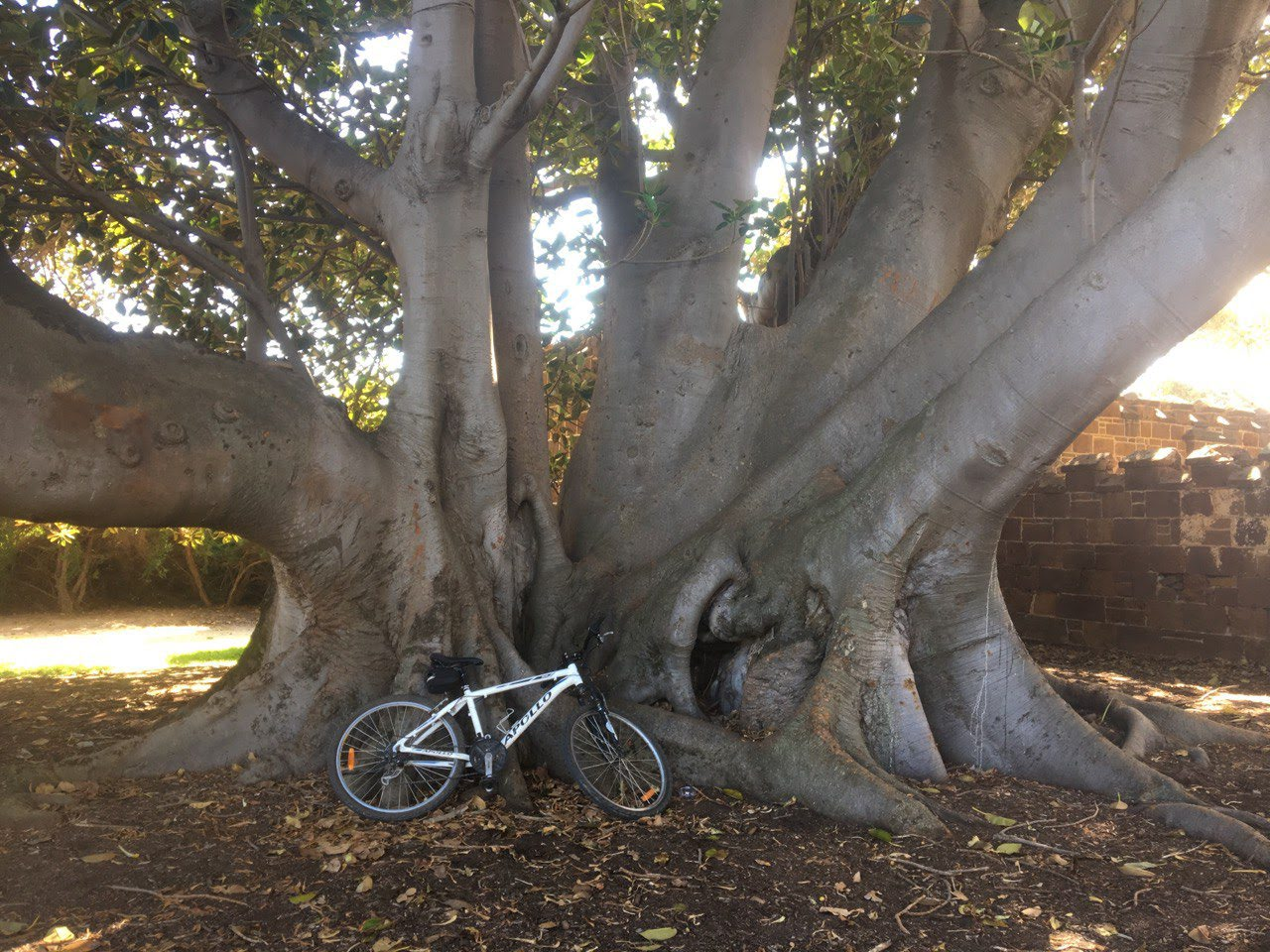
Tree with a bicycle providing scale

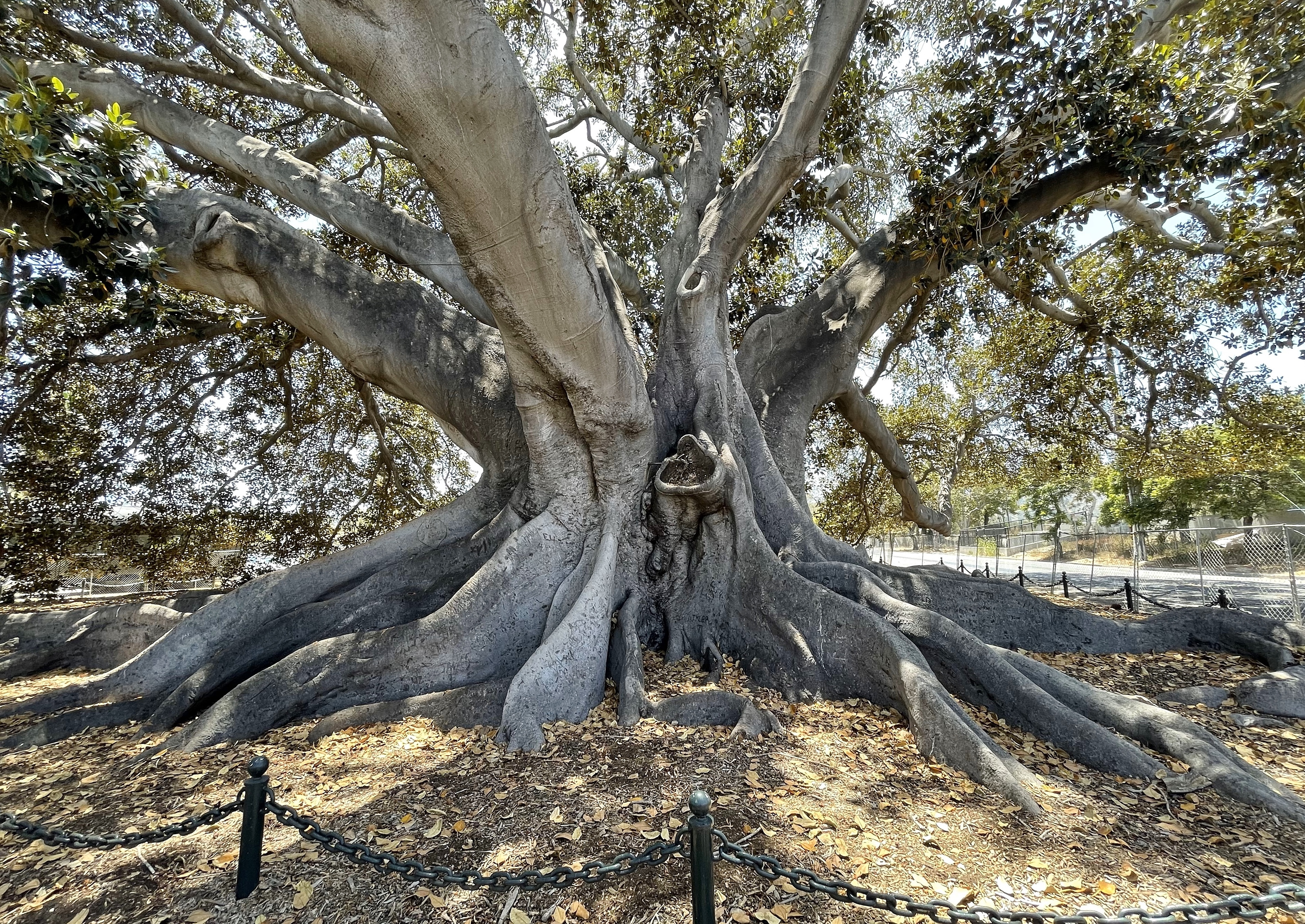
Santa Barbara's Moreton Bay fig tree

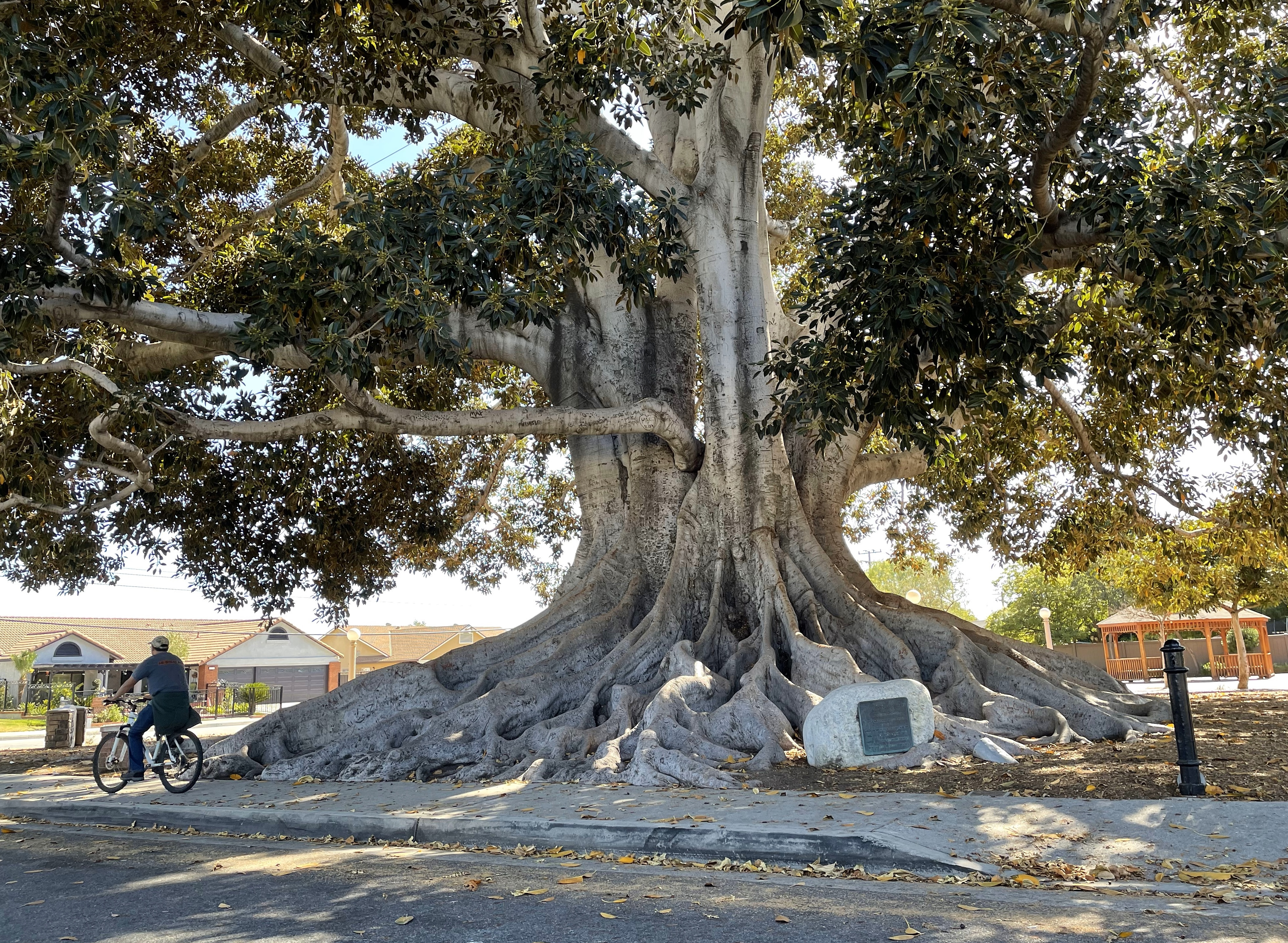
Large tree in Glendora, California

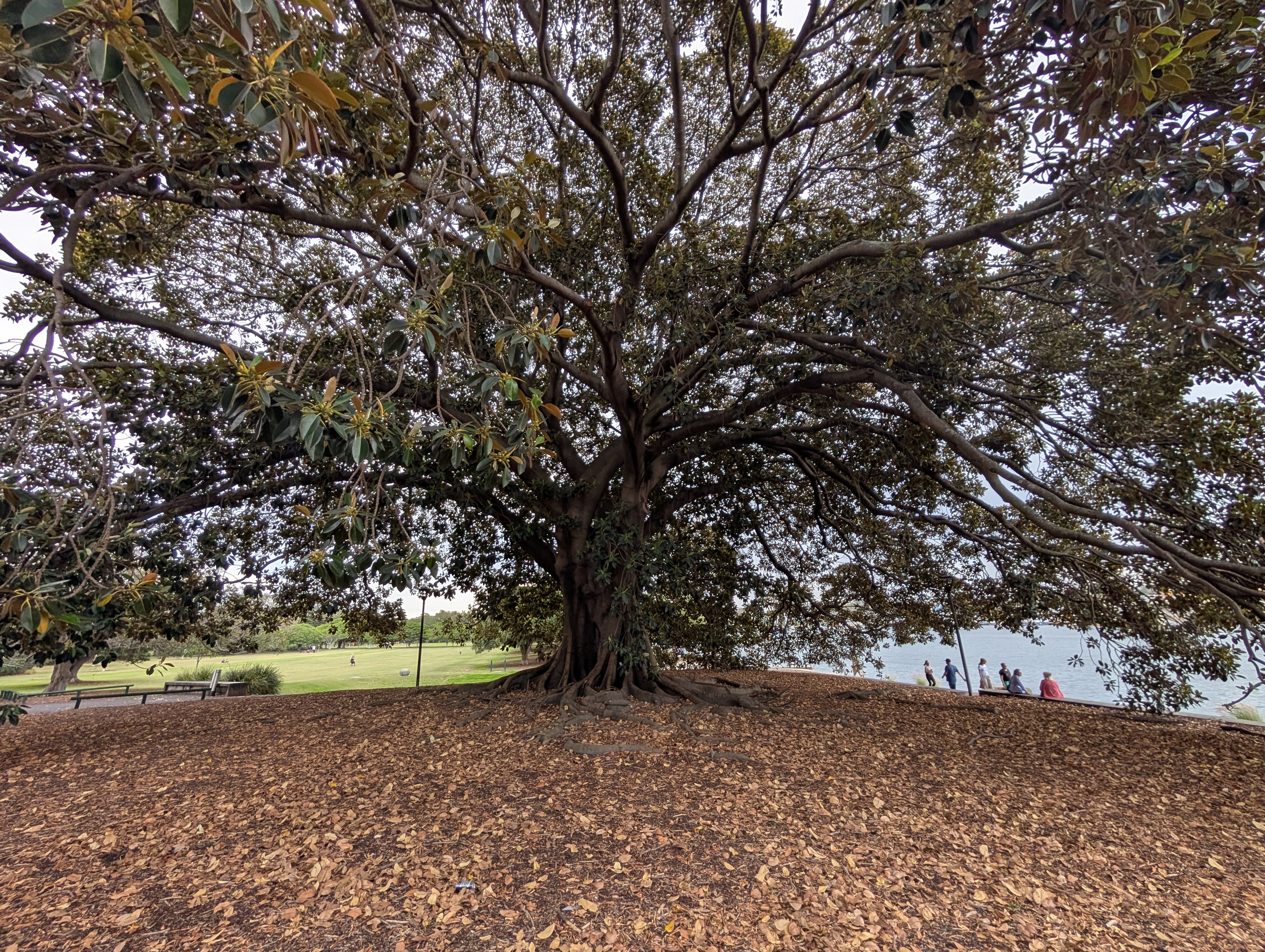
One of the two large figs at the Glebe foreshore, Sydney

== See also ==
- Ficus rubiginosa
- Ficus benjamina
