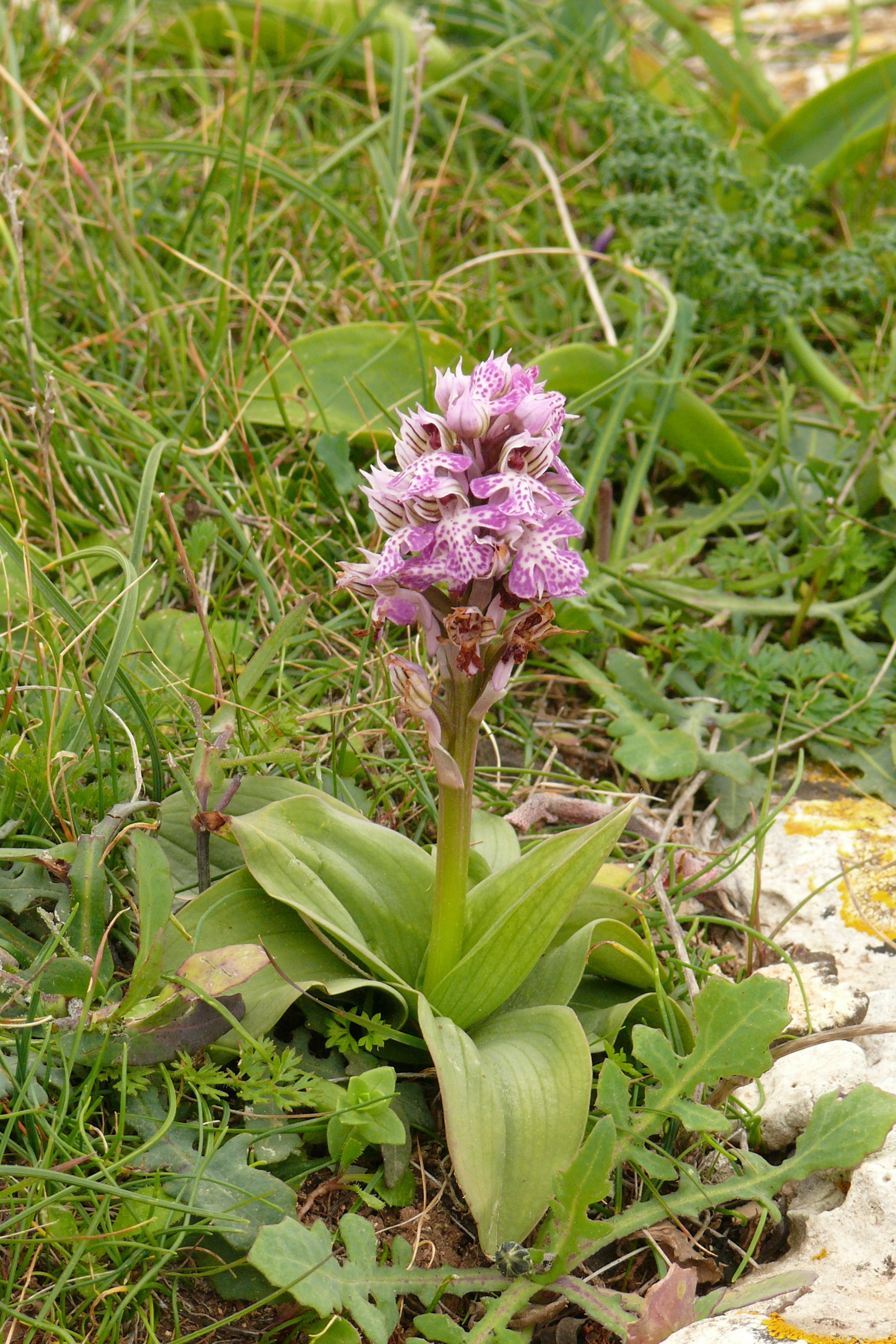
- Neotinea lactea

Scientific classification
- Kingdom: Plantae
- Clade: Tracheophytes
- Clade: Angiosperms
- Clade: Monocots
- Order: Asparagales
- Family: Orchidaceae
- Subfamily: Orchidoideae
- Tribe: Orchideae
- Subtribe: Orchidinae
- Genus: Neotinea; Rchb.f.

Type species
- Neotinea maculata

Synonyms
- Tinea Biv., illegitimate; Odontorchis D.Tyteca & E.Klein

= Neotinea =

Genus of orchids

Neotinea is a genus of flowering plants from the orchid family, Orchidaceae. It is native to much of Europe, the Mediterranean region, and the islands of the eastern Atlantic, from the Canaries, Madeira and Ireland east to Iran and Western Siberia.

== Description ==
The Neotinea species are relatively low-growing and small, perennial herbaceous plants. They form ovoid tubers as outlasting organs, so they belong to the geophytes. Each plant has two tubers, one old (previous year) and one new (this year). The erect stem is often slightly bluish. There are two to four leaves in a basal rosette and one or two more on the stem, these can be spotted or unspotted.

The densely flowered inflorescence is cylindrical in outline, sometimes conical. The bracts are formed as membranous bracts. The hermaphrodite flowers are relatively small, they are greenish white, straw-colored, whitish or pink in color, zygomorphic and triad. The bracts, especially the lip, are often mottled darker pink to purple or have a line drawing. The lip has three lobes, the middle lobe is occasionally divided into two, and its surface is often covered with small papillae. The spur is always present, it can be short and conical or longer and cylindrical. The five other petals (sepals and petals) are tilted forward together, forming a helmet. The columna is short, with two large lateral scars that meet at the bottom. The two pollinia are short-stalked. As with all orchids, the seeds are very numerous and dust-fine, often only 1/4 millimeter in size and a millionth of a gram in weight.

== Taxonomy ==
The genus Neotinea is named after an Italian botanist, Vincenzo Tineo (1791-1856), who was Director of Palermo botanical garden and later the Chancellor of Palermo University. His published works include 'Plantarum rariorum Sicilae' (1817) and 'Catalogus plantarum horti' (1827) The formerly monotypic genus Neotinea was extended in a revision of the Subtribe Orchidinae by Bateman in 1997 on the basis of genetic characters to include the species in the Galericulatae section of the genus Orchis.

=== Species ===
As of June 2014, the World Checklist of Selected Plant Families accepts four divided into two sections including one of natural hybrid.

Section	Image	Name	Subspecies	Distribution
Section Neotinea		Neotinea maculata (Desf.) Stearn		Asia Minor and parts of Europe and North Africa.
Section Tridentatae H.Kretzschmar, Eccarius & H.Dietr.		Neotinea lactea (Poir.) R.M.Bateman, Pridgeon & M.W.Chase (syn. Orchis lactea)		Europe from France to Turkey and in two North African countries: Algeria and Tunisia.
Section Tridentatae H.Kretzschmar, Eccarius & H.Dietr.		Neotinea tridentata (Scop.) R.M.Bateman, Pridgeon & M.W.Chase (syn. Orchis tridentata)	Neotinea tridentata subsp. tridentata R. M. Bateman, Pridgeon & M. W. Chase; Neotinea tridentata subsp. conica R. M. Bateman, Pridgeon & M. W. Chase Morocco to south-western France	southern Europe from Spain to Turkey; northwards to the Crimea, Poland and Germany.
Section Tridentatae H.Kretzschmar, Eccarius & H.Dietr.		Neotinea ustulata (L.) R.M.Bateman, Pridgeon & M.W.Chase (syn. Orchis ustulata)	Neotinea ustulata var. aestivalis (Kümpel) Tali, M.F.Fay & R.M.Bateman; Neotinea ustulata var. ustulata (L.) R.M.Bateman, Pridgeon & M.W.Chase	central and southern Europe

=== Natural Hybrids ===
Image	Name	Parentage	Distribution
	Neotinea × dietrichiana (Bogenh.) H.Kretzschmar, Eccarius & H.Dietr.	(N. tridentata × N. ustulata)	Europe

== See also ==
- List of Orchidaceae genera
