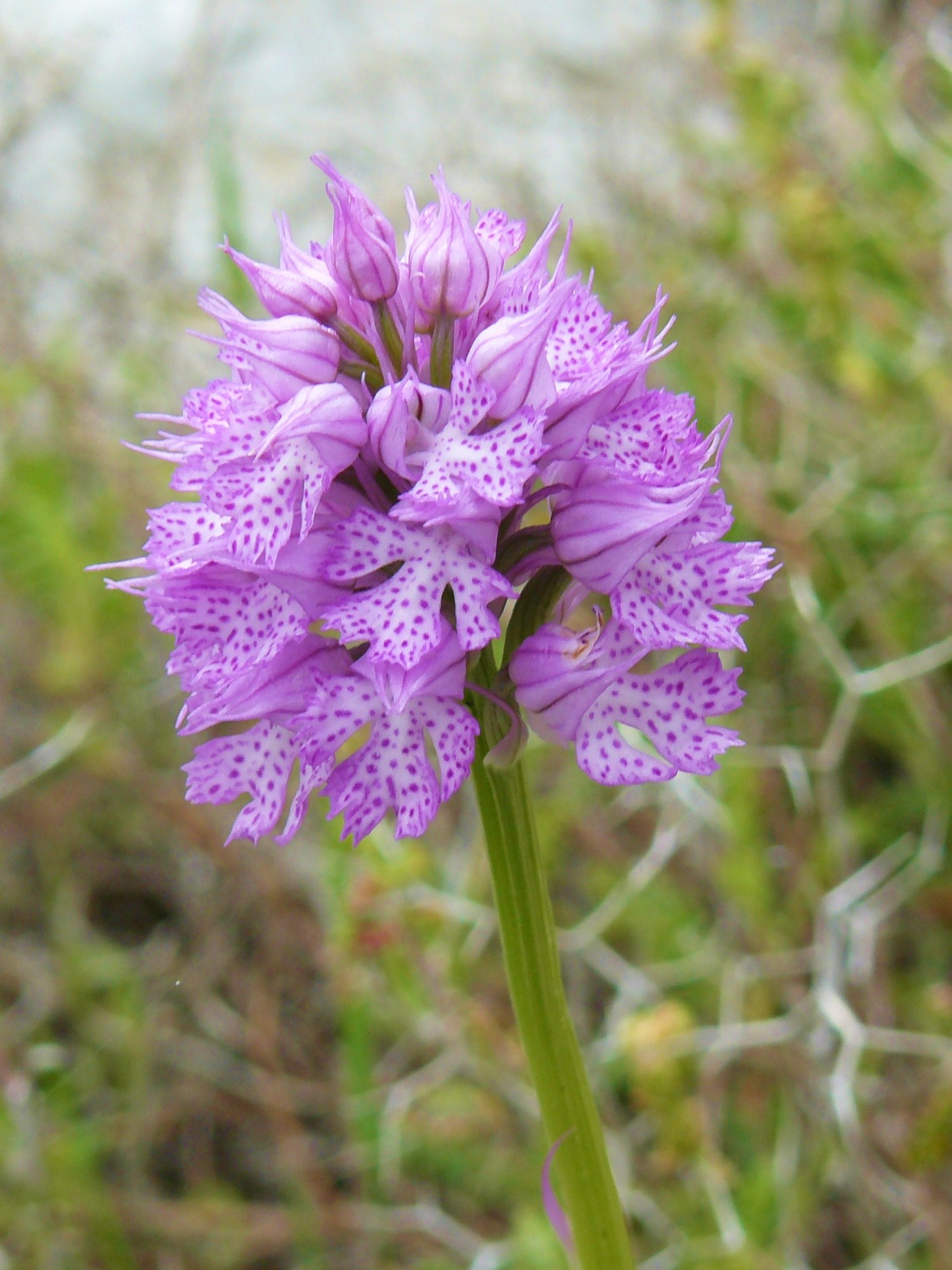

Scientific classification
- Kingdom: Plantae
- Clade: Tracheophytes
- Clade: Angiosperms
- Clade: Monocots
- Order: Asparagales
- Family: Orchidaceae
- Subfamily: Orchidoideae
- Genus: Neotinea
- Species: N. tridentata

Binomial name
- Neotinea tridentata (Scop.) R.M.Bateman, Pridgeon & M.W.Chase

Synonyms
- Orchis tridentata Scop.

= Neotinea tridentata =

Three-toothed orchid

Species of plant

Neotinea tridentata, the three-toothed orchid, is a species of orchid found in southern Europe from Spain to Turkey; northwards to the Crimea, Poland and Germany. This orchid favours grassy places, woodland, scrub and maquis.

== Taxonomy ==
The genus Neotinea is named after an Italian botanist, Vincenzo Tineo (1791-1856), who was Director of Palermo botanical garden and later the Chancellor of Palermo University. His published works include 'Plantarum rariorum Sicilae' (1817) and 'Catalogus plantarum horti' (1827). The specific epithet tridentata is Latin for three-toothed, a reference to the three main lobes of the labellum. This species was formerly placed in the genus Orchis as O. tridentata. Orchis comes from the Greek for testicle, a reference to the shape of some species' tuberous roots.
