= Moreton Bay Fig Tree (Balboa Park) =

Large tree in southern California, USA

Moreton Bay fig
- The tree in 2026

- Location within California
- Location: Balboa Park, San Diego, California, United States
- Coordinates: 32°43′58″N 117°08′51″W
- Date seeded: 1914

The Moreton Bay fig tree in San Diego's Balboa Park is one of the largest trees in California.

== History ==
It began its life when it was planted in 1914. During the Panama–California Exposition it was part of the San Diego County garden exhibit; as of 2017 it is the last remaining plant from the exhibit. The area underneath it was fenced off to the public in 1989 due to damage to the fig caused by foot traffic.
