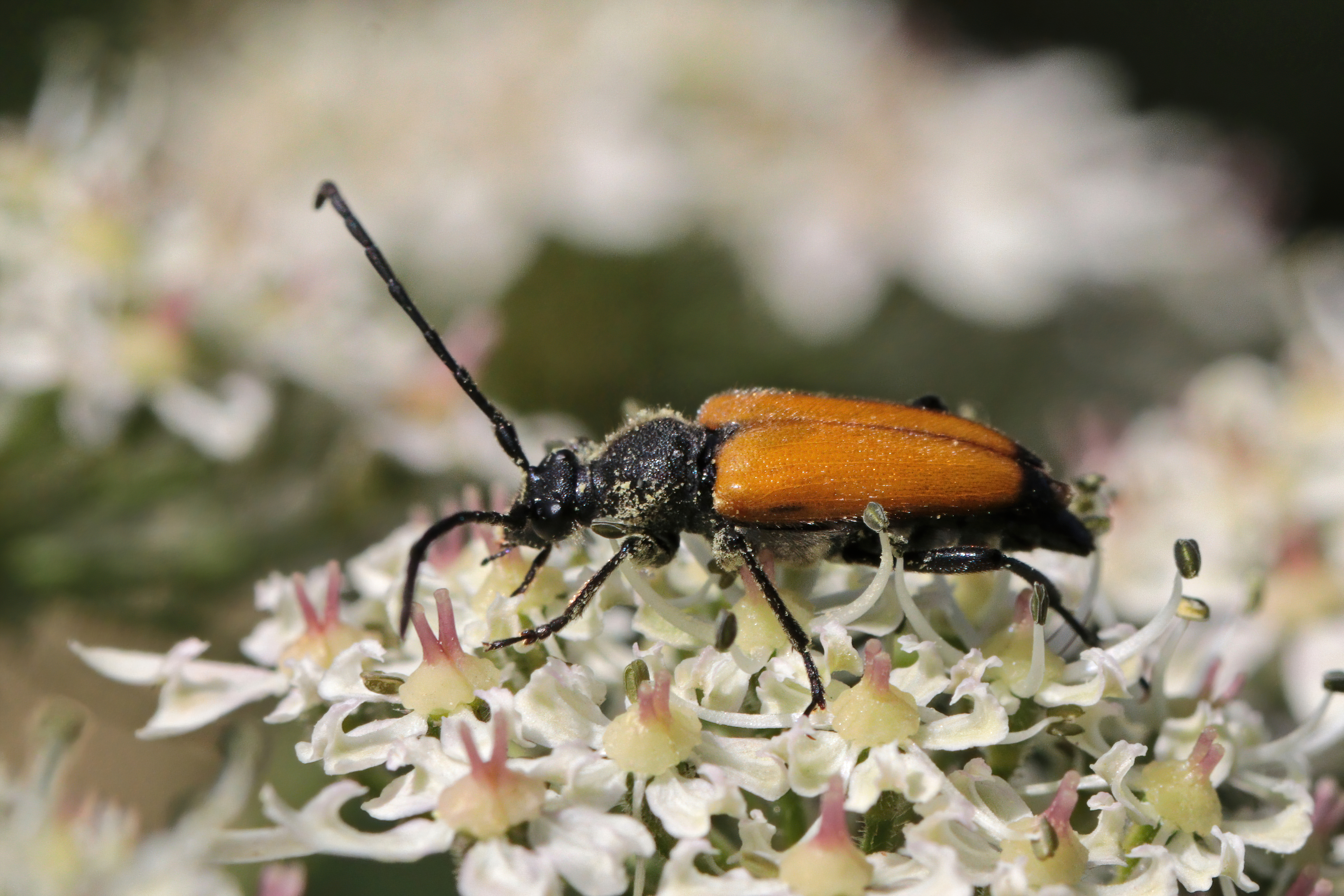
- Pseudovadonia livida

Scientific classification
- Kingdom: Animalia
- Phylum: Arthropoda
- Class: Insecta
- Order: Coleoptera
- Suborder: Polyphaga
- Infraorder: Cucujiformia
- Family: Cerambycidae
- Subfamily: Lepturinae
- Genus: Pseudovadonia; Lobanov, Danilevsky & Murzin, 1981

Synonyms
- Leptura (Vadonia) (Mulsant) Kaszab, 1938

= Pseudovadonia =

Genus of beetles

Pseudovadonia is a genus of beetles belonging to the family Cerambycidae, subfamily Lepturinae.

== Species ==
Pseudovadonia is monotypic and includes only the following species:

- Pseudovadonia livida (Fabricius, 1776)
