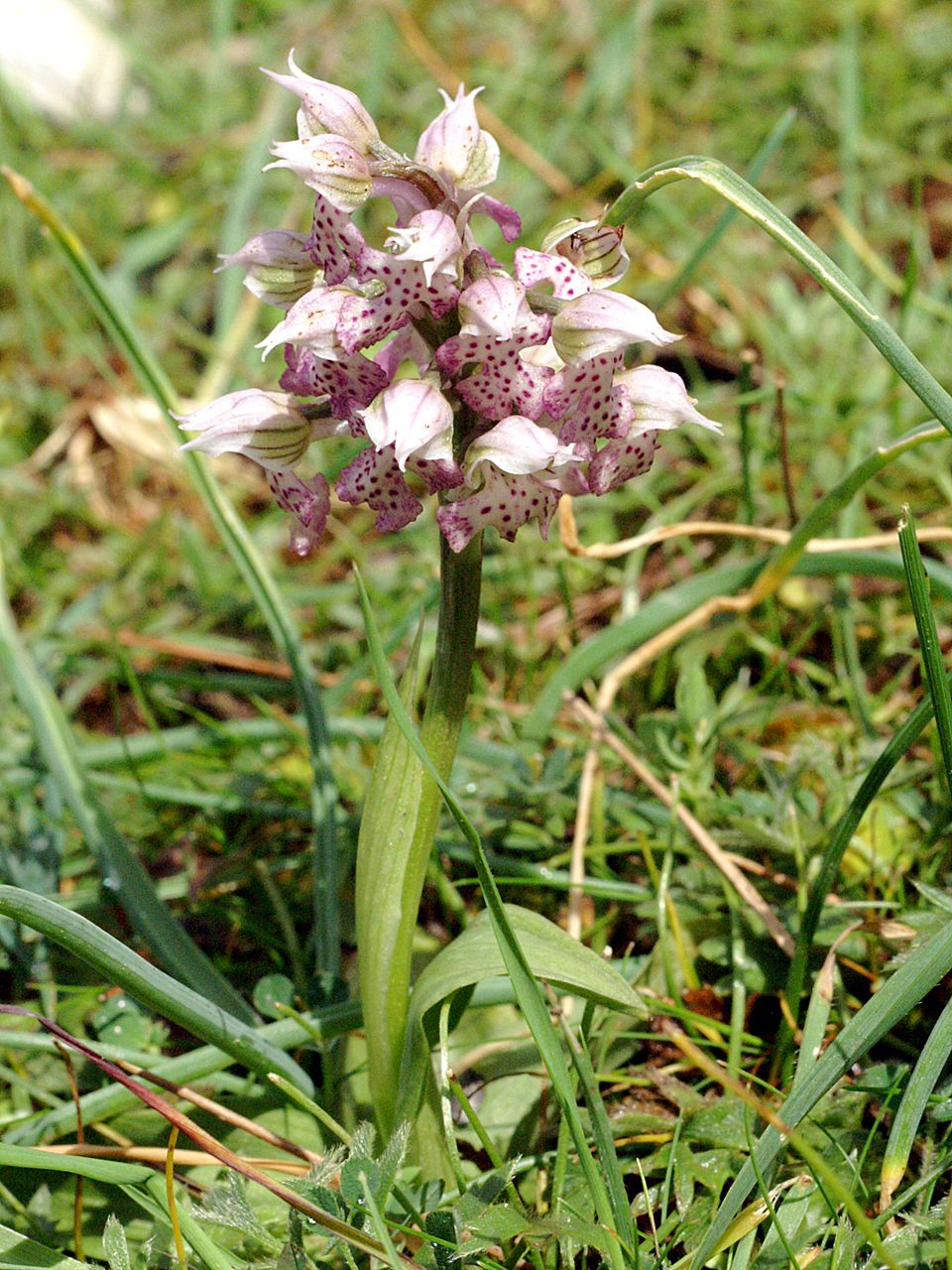

Scientific classification
- Kingdom: Plantae
- Clade: Tracheophytes
- Clade: Angiosperms
- Clade: Monocots
- Order: Asparagales
- Family: Orchidaceae
- Subfamily: Orchidoideae
- Genus: Neotinea
- Species: N. lactea

Binomial name
- Neotinea lactea (Poir.) R.M.Bateman, Pridgeon & M.W.Chase

Synonyms
- Neotinea corsica (Viv.) W.Foelsche; Neotinea lactea subsp. corsica (Viv.) Kreutz; Neotinea lactea var. corsica (Viv.) P.Delforge; Neotinea lactea f. hanrii (Jord.) P.Delforge; Neotinea lactea f. minuscula (A.Alibertis) P.Delforge; Odontorchis lactea (Poir.) D.Tyteca & E.Klein; Orchis acuminata Desf.; Orchis corsica Viv.; Orchis hanrici Hénon; Orchis hanrii Jord.; Orchis lactea Poir.; Orchis lactea subsp. corsica (Viv.) Kreutz; Orchis lactea subsp. minuscula A.Alibertis; Orchis tenoreana Guss.; Orchis tridentata var. hanrii (Jord.) Sigunov

= Neotinea lactea =

Milky orchid

Species of plant

Neotinea lactea, the milky orchid, is a species of orchid found in Europe from France to Turkey and in two North African countries: Algeria and Tunisia. Its flowers are pale to light pink, reflecting its Latin root lacteus (milky).

The species were first described in 1798 by Poiret from Algeria.

== Description ==
Neotinea lactea is a robust polycarpic geophyte of 10 to 25 cm high when flowering. The flower stem has a round cross-section with a rosette of 4 to 6 leaves at the base and is slightly ribbed at the top, with several smaller leaves sheathing the stem higher up. The many small flowers form a dense cluster of up to 7 cm long and oval or cylindrical in shape.

== Habitat ==
Neotinea lactea prefers a dry calcareous soil with full sun to semi-shaded light. Plants can be found up to 1800 m elevation on calcareous grasslands, abandoned olive orchards, exposed locations in a garrigue and open forests.
