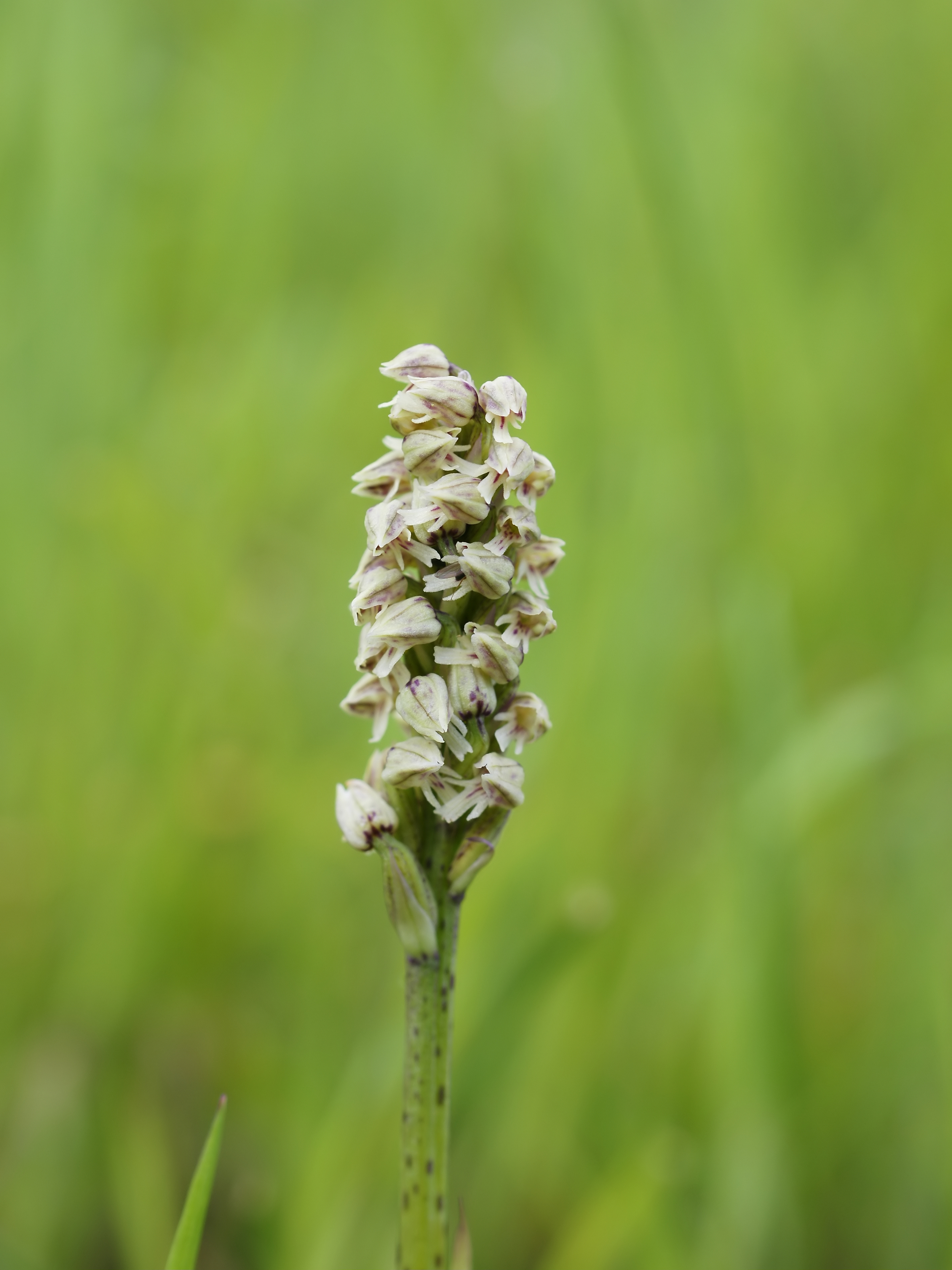

Scientific classification
- Kingdom: Plantae
- Clade: Tracheophytes
- Clade: Angiosperms
- Clade: Monocots
- Order: Asparagales
- Family: Orchidaceae
- Subfamily: Orchidoideae
- Genus: Neotinea
- Species: N. maculata

Binomial name
- Neotinea maculata (Desf.) Stearn, 1974

= Neotinea maculata =

Dense-flowered orchid

Species of orchid

Neotinea maculata, the dense-flowered orchid, is an orchid native to Asia Minor and parts of Europe and North Africa. (Codes)

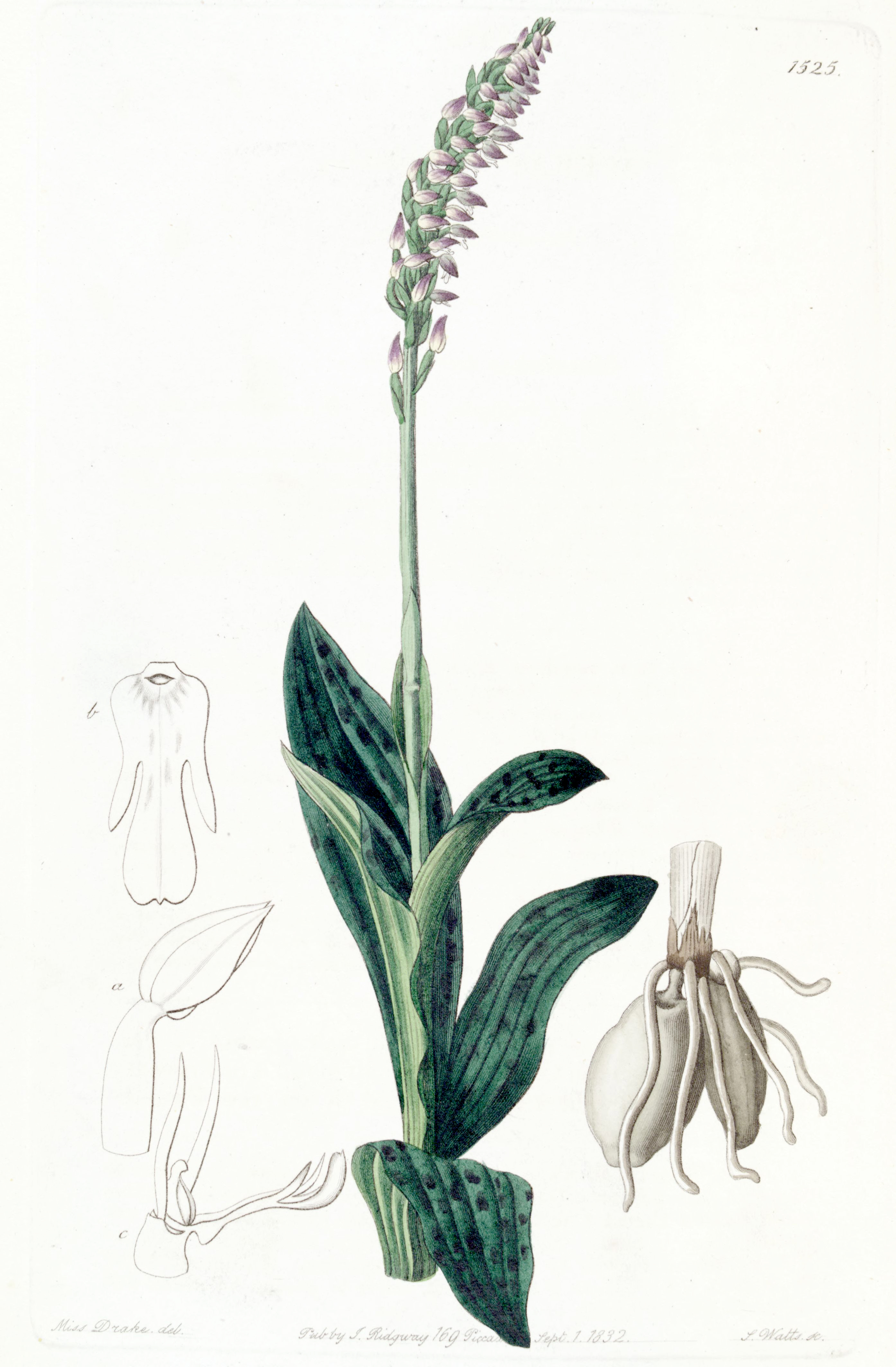
Neotinea maculata

== Description ==
The leaves are oblong, 5 cm in length, and form a basal rosette which develops from round underground nodules that are up to 6 cm in diameter. Stems emerge vertically from the rosette and are covered for a third of their length with a light green bract. The flowering period is from April to June, during which an inflorescence of small white to pink flowers is produced.
