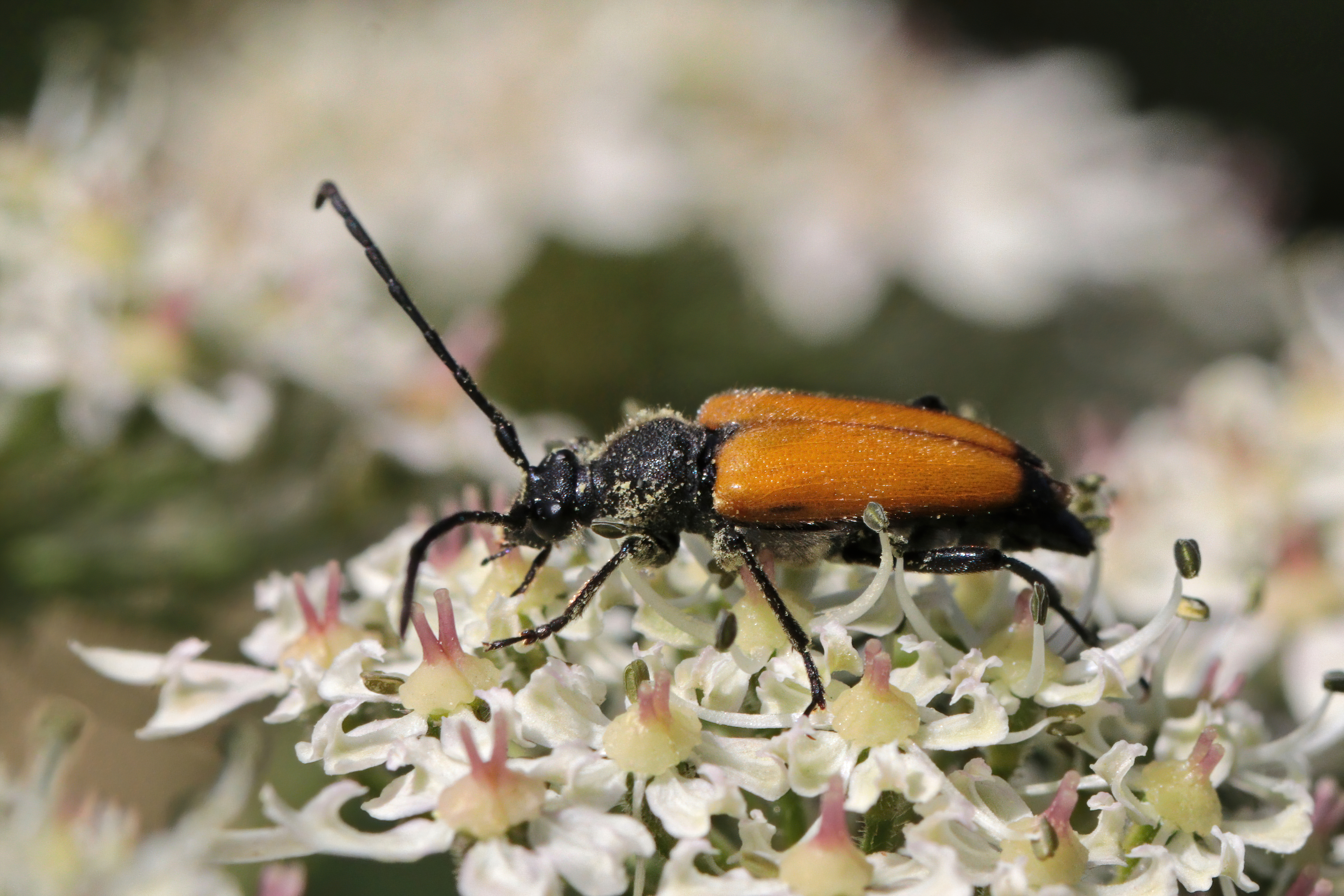

Scientific classification
- Kingdom: Animalia
- Phylum: Arthropoda
- Class: Insecta
- Order: Coleoptera
- Suborder: Polyphaga
- Infraorder: Cucujiformia
- Family: Cerambycidae
- Genus: Pseudovadonia
- Species: P. livida

Binomial name
- Pseudovadonia livida (Fabricius, 1776)

Synonyms
- Anoplodera livida (Fabricius) Hallqvist, 2005; Pseudalosterna livida (Fabricius); Vadonia livida (Fabricius) Mulsant, 1863; Leptura livida 1776

= Pseudovadonia livida =

Species of beetle

Pseudovadonia livida, the fairy-ring longhorn beetle, is a beetle species of flower longhorns belonging to the family Cerambycidae, subfamily Lepturinae.

== Subspecies ==
Subspecies include:

- Pseudovadonia livida bicarinata (Arnold, 1869)
- Pseudovadonia livida desbrochersi (Pic, 1891)
- Pseudovadonia livida hatayensis Özdikmen, 2015
- Pseudovadonia livida livida (Fabricius, 1776)
- Pseudovadonia livida pecta (J. Daniel & K. Daniel, 1891)
- Pseudovadonia livida setosa Danilevsky, 2013

== Distribution ==
This beetle is widespread in most of Europe, in the eastern Palearctic realm, and in the Near East (Armenia, Azerbaijan, Belarus, Belgium, Bulgaria, China, Czech Republic (Bohemia, Moravia), Estonia, France, Georgia, Germany, Greece, Iran, Italy, Kazakhstan, Kyrgyzstan, Latvia, Lithuania, Luxembourg, Moldova, Netherlands, Poland, Portugal, Romania, Russia, Sicily, Slovakia, Spain, Turkey, Ukraine, and the United Kingdom).

== Habitat ==
This species mainly inhabits pine forests, but they are also present in deciduous trees (Quercus and Castanea species).

== Description ==
The adults of Pseudovadonia livida grow up to 5–9 millimetres (0.20–0.35 in). These small beetles are robust and have a broad head with large eyes, dense puncturation and erect pubescence. The antennae are black and robust, slightly shorter than the body. Pronotum is quadrate and shiny black, with shallow puncturation on the surface. Also the scutellum is shining black. Elytra are reddish-brown with darker suture. Shoulders are much wider than the base of the pronotum. They are covered with fine semi-erect golden hair.

== Biology ==
Adults can be encountered from May through September, completing their life cycle in two years. They are very common flower-visitors, especially Apiaceae species, feeding on pollen and the nectar. Larvae do not develop in dead wood, as usual in many species of Cerambycidae, but in humus infested by fungus Marasmius oreades, feeding on mycelium.

== Gallery ==
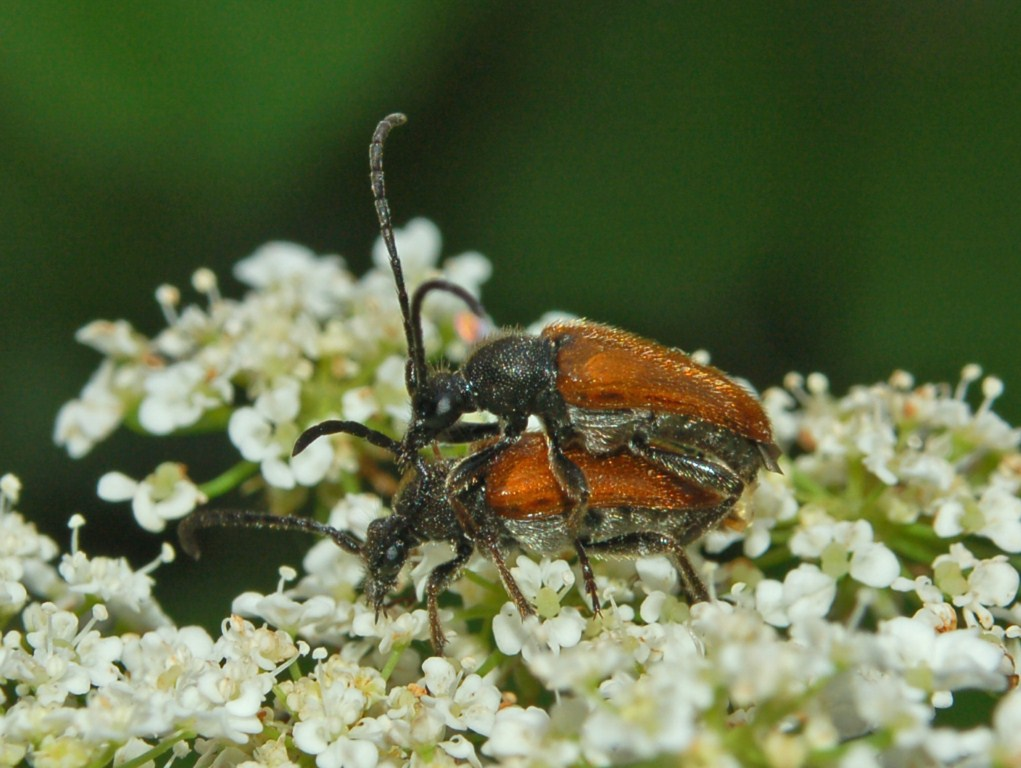
Mating pair

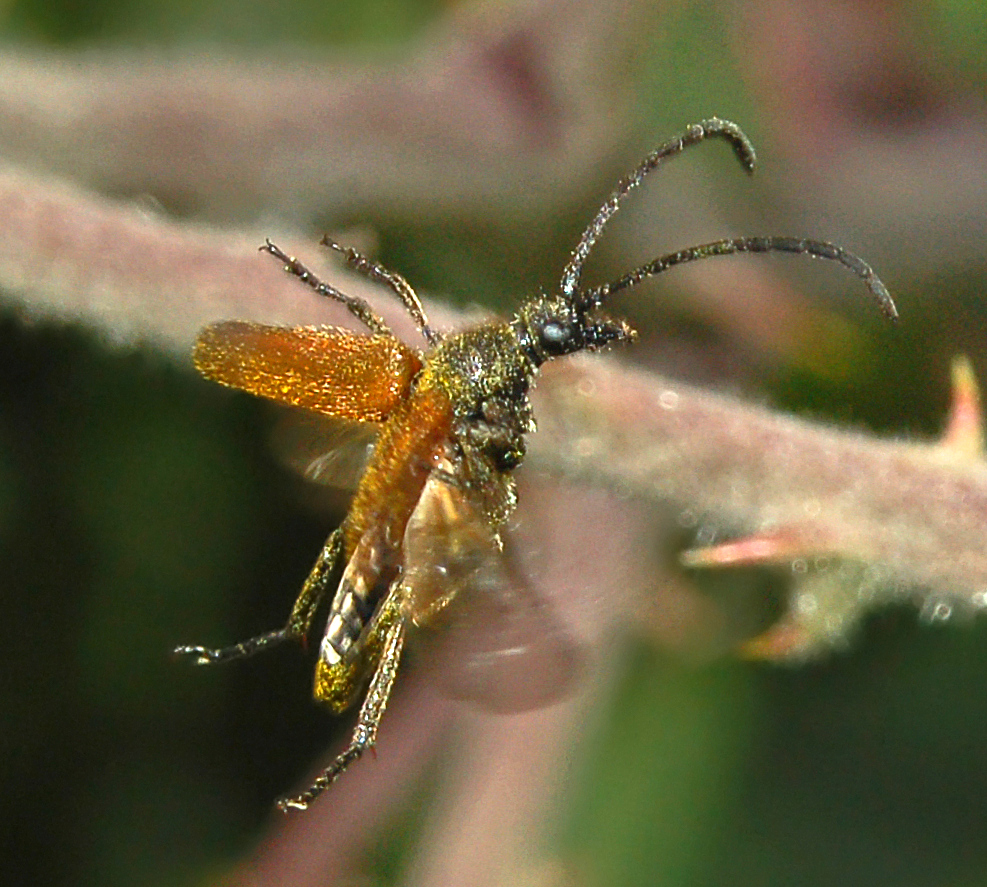
In flight

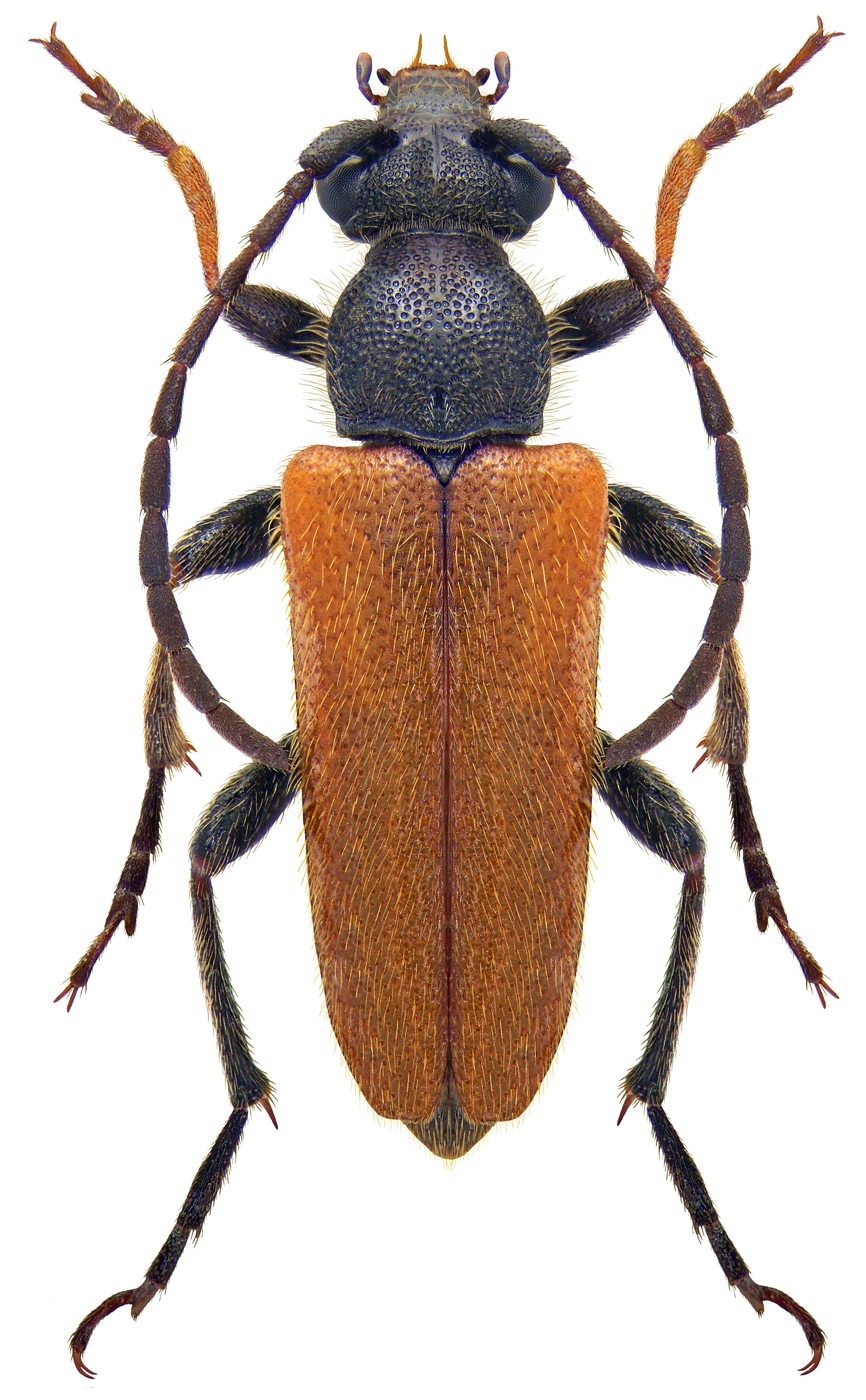
Mounted specimen

Clip
