= Vincenzo Tineo =

Italian botanist

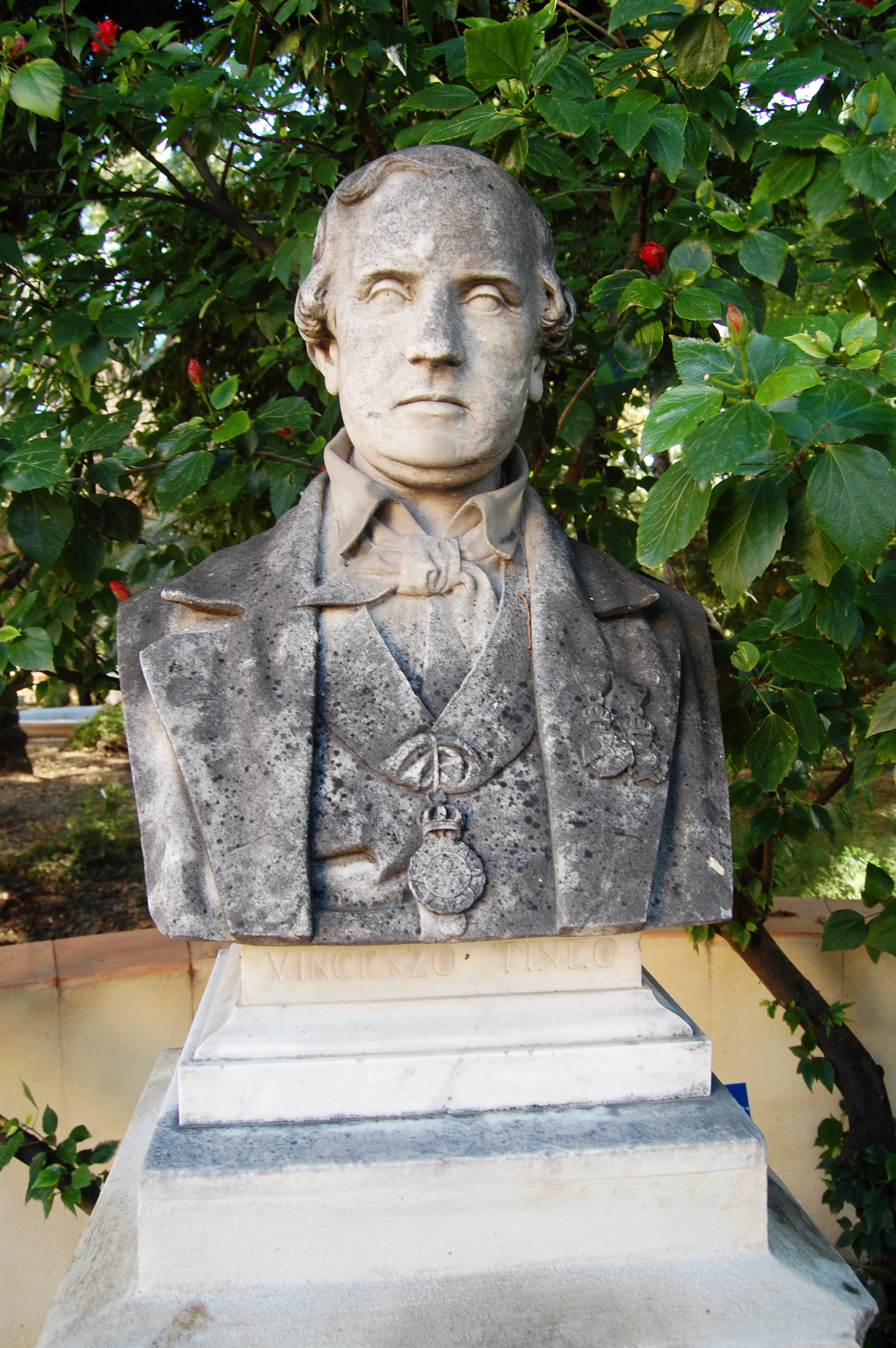
Vincenzo Tineo

Vincenzo Tineo (Militello in Val di Catania, 27 February 1791 – Palermo, 25 July 1856) was an Italian Botanist. From 1814 to 1856 he was the director of the Palermo Botanical Garden. This botanist is denoted by the author abbreviation Tineo when citing a botanical name.

== Works ==
- Tineo, V. Catalogus Plantarum Horti Regii Panormitani (Palermo) ad annum 1827. Panormi, ex Regali Typographia, 1827.
- Tineo, V.: Le reliquie Tineane: florae siculae icones ineditae di Vincenzo Tineo / [a cura di] Franco Maria Raimondo. – Palermo, Ed. Naturama, 2000.
