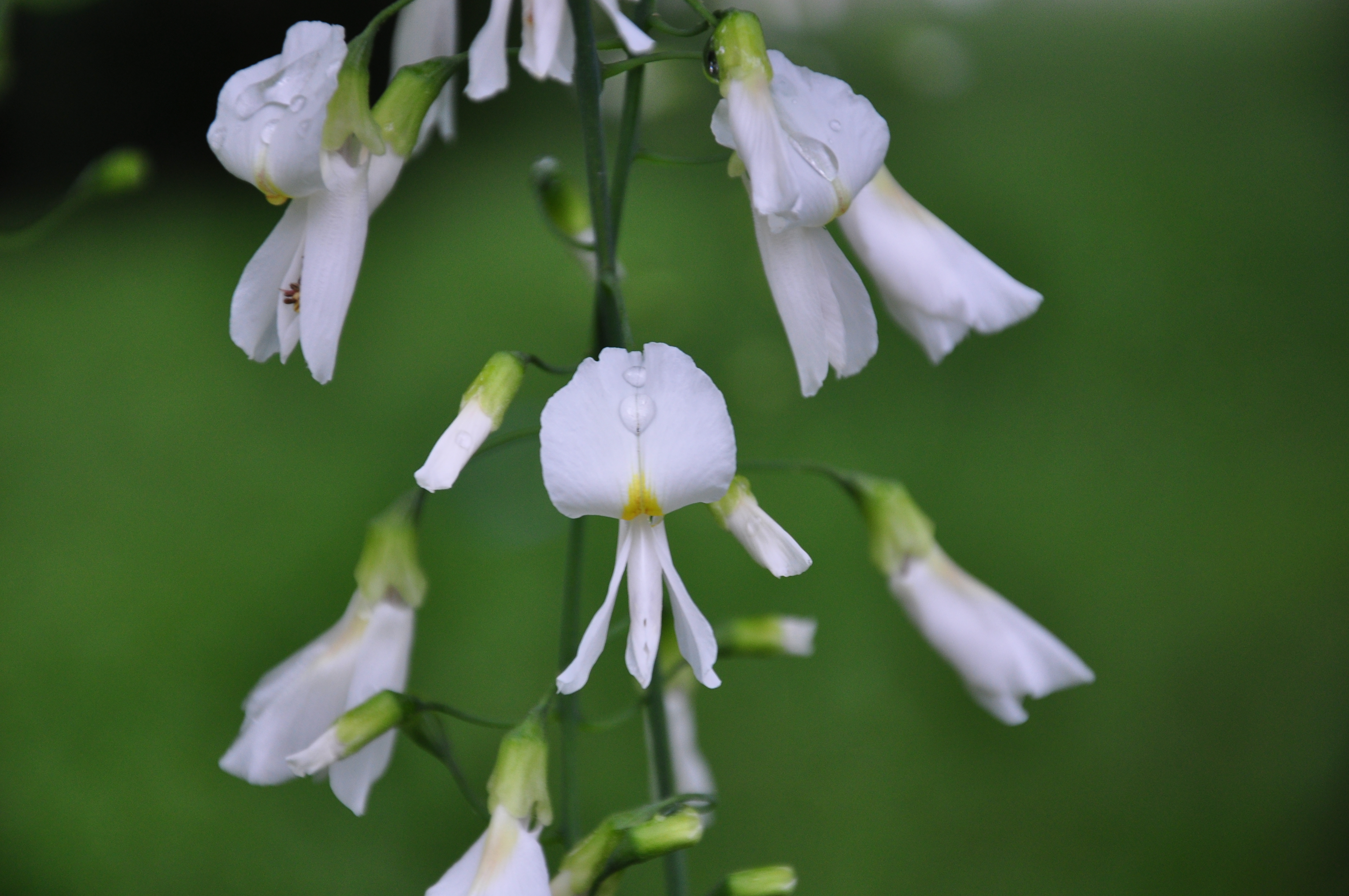
- Cladrastis kentukea

Scientific classification
- Kingdom: Plantae
- Clade: Tracheophytes
- Clade: Angiosperms
- Clade: Eudicots
- Clade: Rosids
- Order: Fabales
- Family: Fabaceae
- Subfamily: Faboideae
- Clade: Cladrastis clade
- Genus: Cladrastis; Raf. (1825)

Species
- See text

= Cladrastis =

Genus of legumes

Cladrastis (yellowwood) is a genus of flowering plants in the family Fabaceae. It includes four species, three native to eastern Asia and one to southeastern North America.

Species of Cladrastis are small to medium-sized deciduous trees typically growing 10–20 m tall, exceptionally to 27 m tall. The leaves are compound pinnate, with 5–17 alternately arranged leaflets. The flowers are fragrant, white or pink, produced in racemes or panicles 15–40 cm long. The fruit is a pod 3–8 cm long, containing one to six seeds.

Cladrastis is related to the genus Maackia, from which it differs in having the buds concealed in the leaf base, and in the leaflets being arranged alternately on the leaf rachis, not in opposite pairs. The genus name derives from the Greek klados, branch, and thraustos, fragile, referring to the brittle nature of the twigs. The combination of Cladrastis, Pickeringia and Styphnolobium form a monophyletic clade known as the Cladrastis clade; as the other two originated from within Cladrastis, Cladrastis is paraphyletic.

== Species ==
Four species are currently accepted:

- Cladrastis delavayi (Franch.) Prain – Bhutan in the Himalayas to Hunan in Central China
- Cladrastis kentukea (Dum.Cours.) Rudd – south-eastern North America.
- Cladrastis shikokiana (Makino) Makino – south-central and southern Japan
- Cladrastis wilsonii Takeda – central China.
