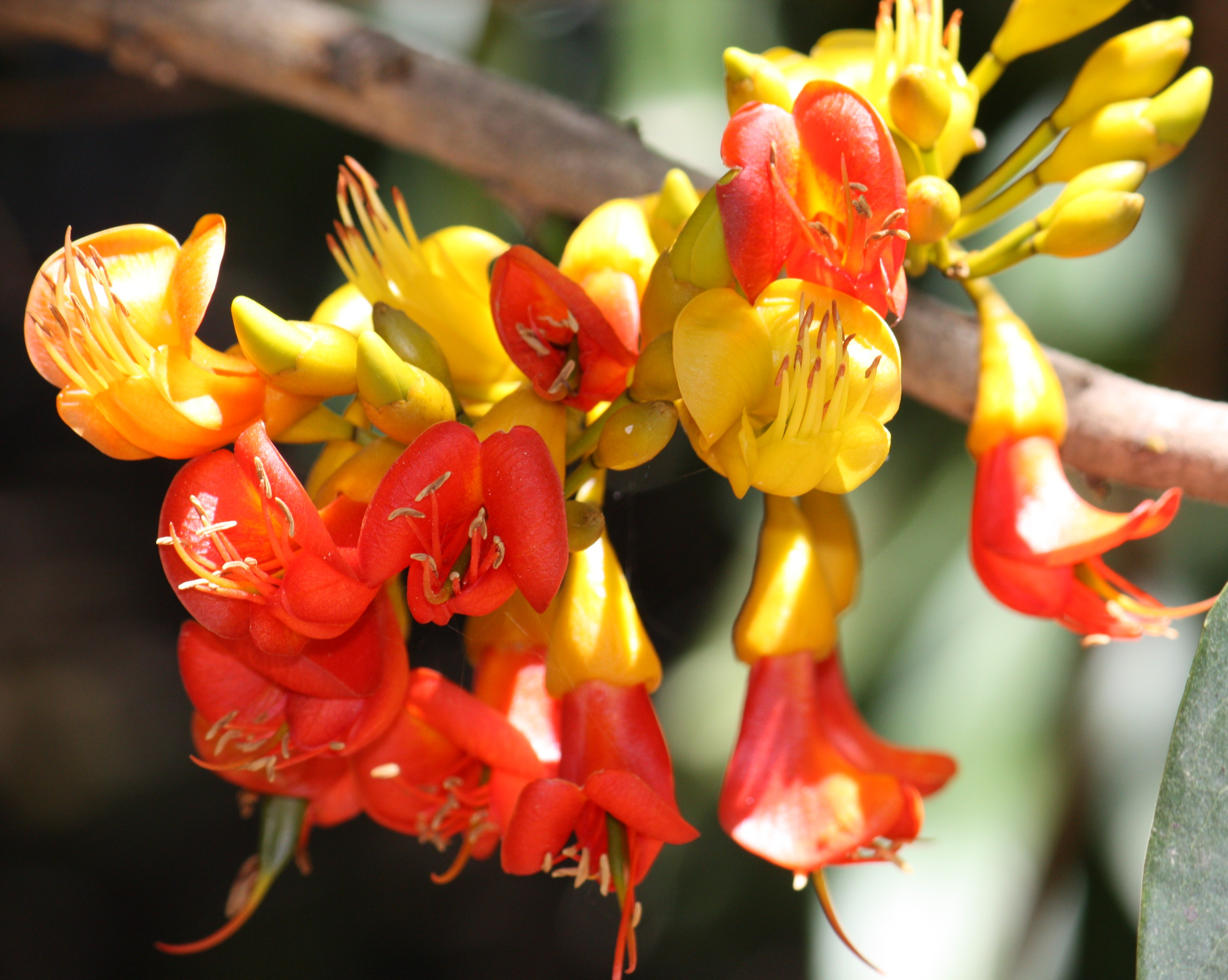
- Castanospermum australe

Scientific classification
- Kingdom: Plantae
- Clade: Tracheophytes
- Clade: Angiosperms
- Clade: Eudicots
- Clade: Rosids
- Order: Fabales
- Family: Fabaceae
- Subfamily: Faboideae
- Clade: ADA clade Cardoso et al. 2012

Tribes
- Amburaneae Nakai; Angylocalyceae Yakovlev; Dipterygeae Polhill

Synonyms
- aldinoid clade Ireland et al. 2000

= ADA clade =

Clade of flowering plants

The ADA clade is the earliest-branching monophyletic clade of the flowering plant subfamily Faboideae (or Papilionaceae). Evidence for this clade was sparse until recent molecular phylogenies that included basal faboid genera that previously had been poorly sampled.

== Description ==
This clade is composed of a morphologically eclectic collection of genera. It is one of only three clades (the other two being Swartzieae and the Cladrastis clade) in Faboideae that lack the 50-Kb plastid DNA inversion that is characteristic of the Meso-Papilionoideae. The name of this clade is informal and is not assumed to have any particular taxonomic rank like the names authorized by the ICBN or the ICPN. The clade does not currently have a node-based definition and no morphological synapomorphies have been identified.
