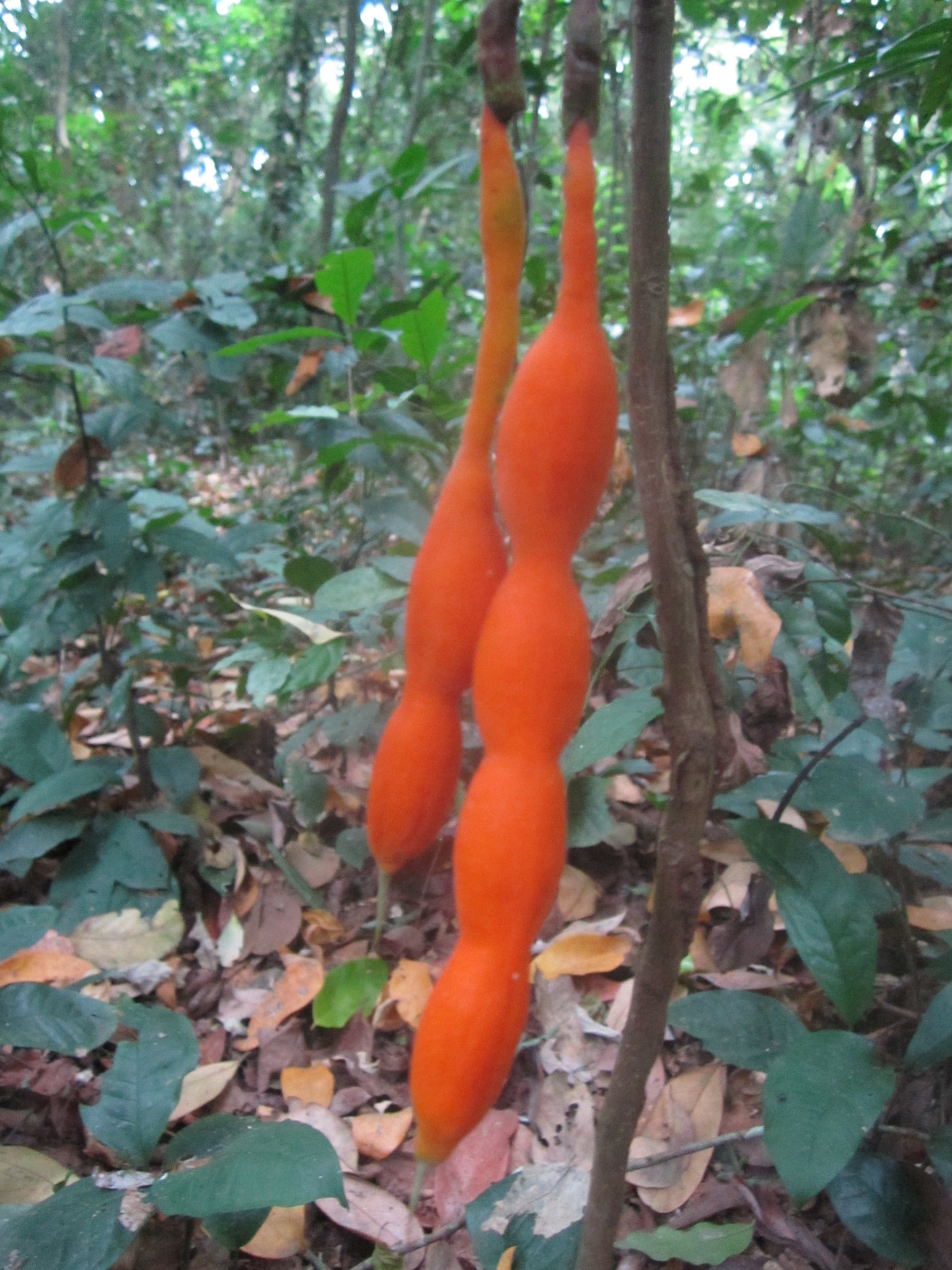
- Angylocalyx oligophyllus in Benin

Scientific classification
- Kingdom: Plantae
- Clade: Embryophytes
- Clade: Tracheophytes
- Clade: Spermatophytes
- Clade: Angiosperms
- Clade: Eudicots
- Clade: Rosids
- Order: Fabales
- Family: Fabaceae
- Subfamily: Faboideae
- Tribe: Angylocalyceae
- Genus: Angylocalyx; Taub. (1896)

Species
- 7; see text

= Angylocalyx =

Genus of legumes

Angylocalyx is a genus of flowering plants in the family Fabaceae. It includes seven species native to sub-Saharan Africa, ranging from Guinea to Angola, Tanzania, and Kenya.

The following species are accepted:

- Angylocalyx boutiqueanus L. Touss.
- Angylocalyx braunii Harms
- Angylocalyx oligophyllus (Baker) Baker f.
- Angylocalyx pynaertii De Wild.
- Angylocalyx schumannianus Taub.
- Angylocalyx talbotii Hutch. & Dalziel
- Angylocalyx vermeulenii De Wild.

Members of this genus accumulate hydroxypipecolic acids and iminosugars in their leaves.
