= Angylocalyx talbotii =

Conservation status
- Least Concern (IUCN 3.1)

Scientific classification
- Kingdom: Plantae
- Clade: Tracheophytes
- Clade: Angiosperms
- Clade: Eudicots
- Clade: Rosids
- Order: Fabales
- Family: Fabaceae
- Subfamily: Faboideae
- Genus: Angylocalyx
- Species: A. talbotii

Binomial name
- Angylocalyx talbotii Baker f. ex Hutch. & Dalziel

Species of legume

Angylocalyx talbotii is a species of flowering plant in the family Fabaceae. It is found in Cameroon and Nigeria. Its natural habitat is subtropical or tropical moist lowland forests. It is threatened by habitat loss.
