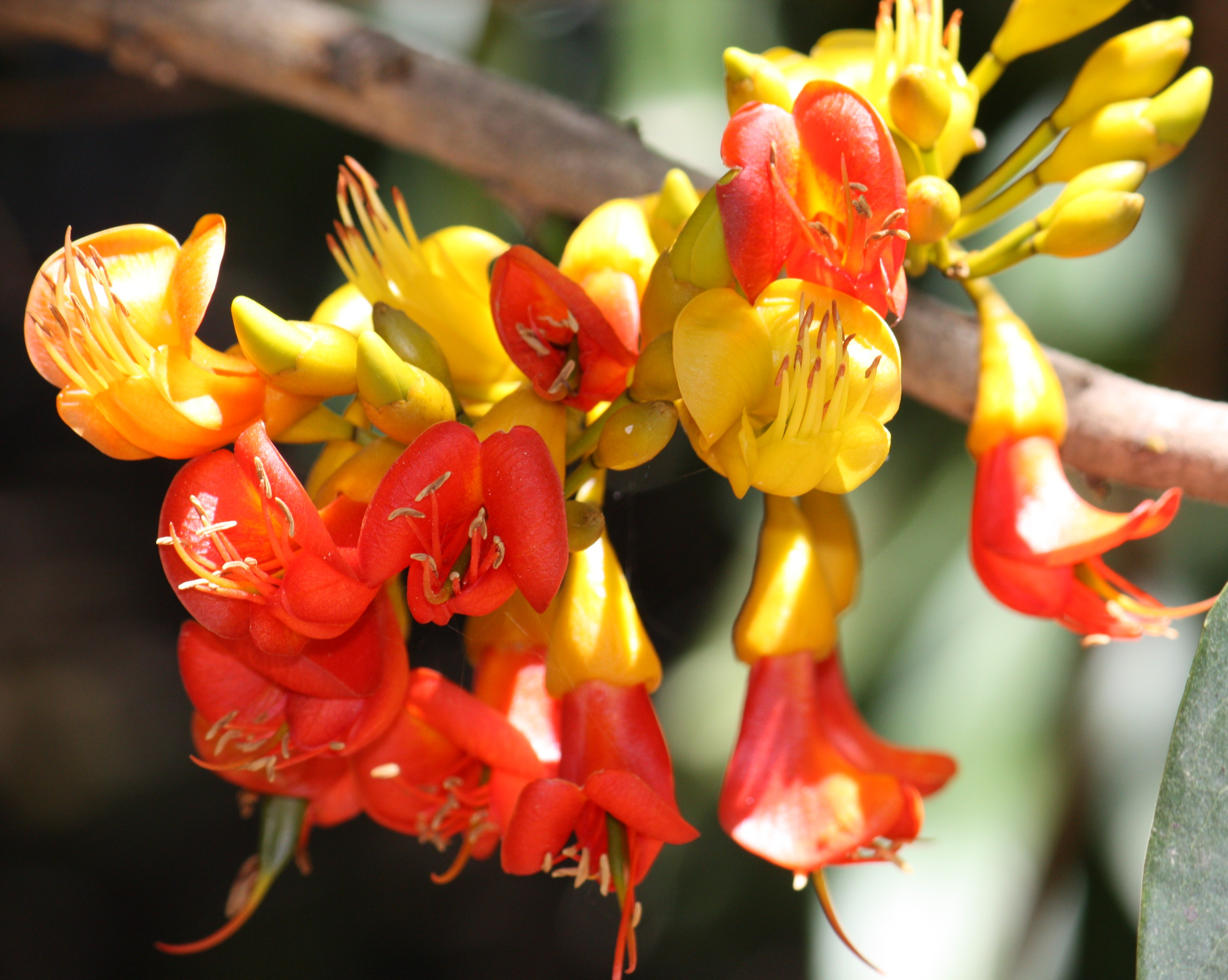
- Castanospermum australe

Scientific classification
- Kingdom: Plantae
- Clade: Tracheophytes
- Clade: Angiosperms
- Clade: Eudicots
- Clade: Rosids
- Order: Fabales
- Family: Fabaceae
- Subfamily: Faboideae
- Clade: ADA clade
- Tribe: Angylocalyceae; Yakovlev

Type genus
- Angylocalyx Taub.

Genera
- See text

Synonyms
- Angylocalyx clade Cardoso et al. 2012; Angylocalyx group sensu Polhill 1994; Angylocalyceae clade; Sophoreae sensu Polhill 1981 pro parte 1

= Angylocalyceae =

Tribe of legumes

The tribe Angylocalyceae is one of the subdivisions of the plant family Fabaceae. It has been circumscribed to include the following genera, which had been placed in tribe Sophoreae:

- Alexa Moq.
- Angylocalyx Taub.
- Castanospermum A.Cunn. ex Hook.
- Uleanthus Harms
- Xanthocercis Baill.

This tribe does not currently have a node-based, phylogenetic definition, but it can be distinguished by the following morphological synapomorphy: "an ornithophilous floral syndrome in which the calyx and hypanthium are enlarged, the petals thickened and often red or orange, the standard often distinctly large, the lower petals undifferentiated or sometimes highly reduced, and the stamens and gynoecium exserted." Also, members of this tribe accumulate iminosugars in their leaves, whereas other members of the ADA clade do not.
