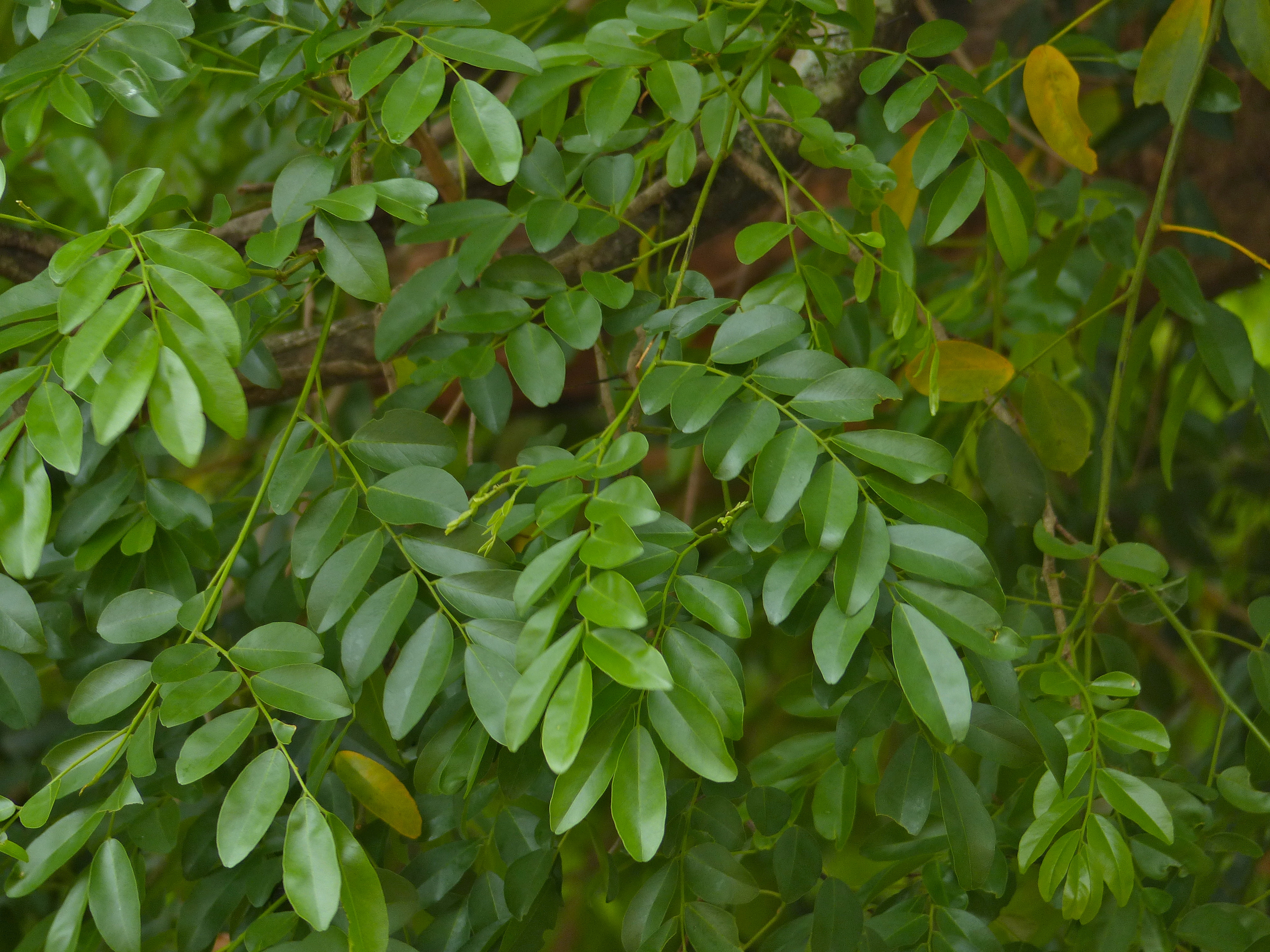

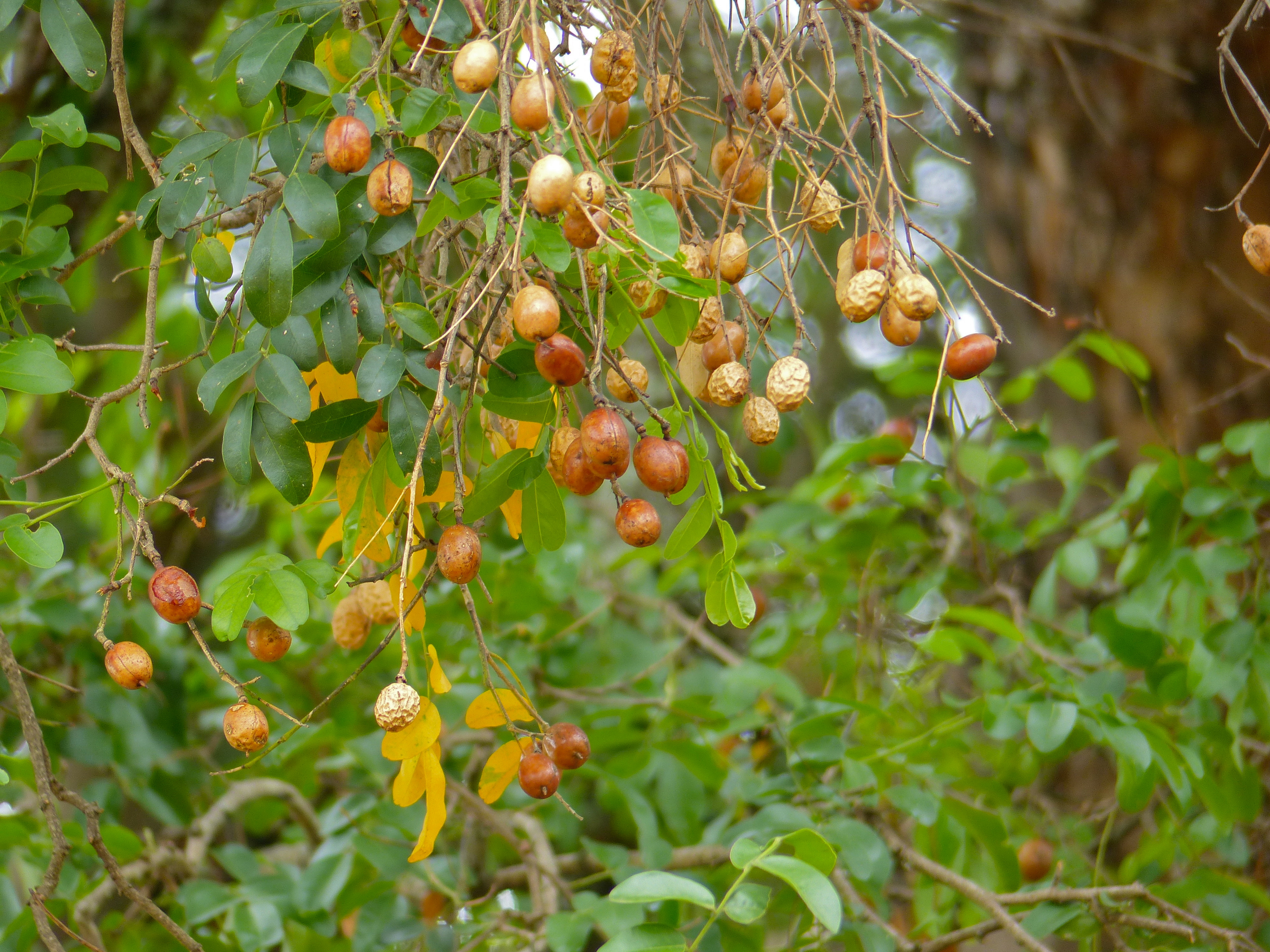
- Foliage and ripe fruit of X. zambesiaca

Scientific classification
- Kingdom: Plantae
- Clade: Tracheophytes
- Clade: Angiosperms
- Clade: Eudicots
- Clade: Rosids
- Order: Fabales
- Family: Fabaceae
- Subfamily: Faboideae
- Tribe: Angylocalyceae
- Genus: Xanthocercis; Baill. (1870)

Species
- Xanthocercis madagascariensis Baill.; Xanthocercis rabiensis Maesen; Xanthocercis zambesiaca (Baker) Dumaz-le-Grand

Synonyms
- Pseudocadia Harms (1902)

= Xanthocercis =

Genus of legumes

Xanthocercis is a tree genus in the family Fabaceae. It includes three species native to sub-Saharan Africa.

- Xanthocercis madagascariensis Baill. — endemic to Madagascar; a deciduous tree, growing up to 30 metres tall. The wood is highly valued, being harvested from the wild for local use and for export. The tree also provides an edible fruit that is used locally.
- Xanthocercis rabiensis Maesen — endemic to Gabon; a large, evergreen tree growing up to 40 metres tall. The straight, cylindrical bole can be up to 300 cm in diameter.
- Xanthocercis zambesiaca (Baker) Dumaz-le-Grand (Mshatu tree) — native to Malawi, Mozambique, South Africa, Zambia and Zimbabwe; a large impressive, evergreen tree with an exceptional dense, rounded to wide-spreading crown of glossy, drooping, dark green leaves and sprays of small rose-scented, creamy white flowers. It usually reaches 30m in height. It is ideal for large gardens.

Members of this genus accumulate hydroxypipecolic acids and iminosugars in their leaves.
