= Alexa (plant) =

Scientific classification
- Kingdom: Plantae
- Clade: Embryophytes
- Clade: Tracheophytes
- Clade: Spermatophytes
- Clade: Angiosperms
- Clade: Eudicots
- Clade: Rosids
- Order: Fabales
- Family: Fabaceae
- Subfamily: Faboideae
- Tribe: Angylocalyceae
- Genus: Alexa; Moq. (1849)

Species
- Alexa bauhiniiflora Ducke; Alexa canaracunensis Pittier; Alexa confusa Pittier; Alexa cowanii Yakovlev; Alexa grandiflora Ducke; Alexa herminiana N. Ramírez; Alexa imperatricis (R.H. Schomb.) Baill.; Alexa leiopetala Sandwith; Alexa surinamensis Yakovlev; Alexa wachenheimii Benoist

Synonyms
- Alexandra R.H.Schomb. (1845), nom. illeg.

Genus of legumes

Alexa is a genus of flowering plants. It includes ten species which are native to Venezuela, Guyana, Suriname, French Guiana, and northern Brazil in northern South America. Members of this genus accumulate iminosugars in their leaves.

== Species ==
Ten species are accepted:

- Alexa bauhiniiflora Ducke - southern Venezuela (Amazonas) and northern Brazil (Amazonas)
- Alexa canaracunensis Pittier – southern Venezuela, Guyana, and northern Brazil
- Alexa confusa Pittier – southern Venezuela and northern Brazil (Roraima)
- Tinajilo (Alexa cowanii) Yakovlev – eastern Venezuela and Guyana
- Melancieira (Alexa grandiflora) Ducke – northern Brazil
- Chigo (Alexa herminiana) N. Ramírez – southern Venezuela (Amazonas)
- Alexa imperatricis (R.H. Schomb.) Baill. – Venezuela, Guyana, and northern Brazil
- Alexa leiopetala Sandwith – Guyana
- Haiarballi (Alexa surinamensis) Yakovlev – Guyana and Suriname
- Alexa wachenheimii Benoist – Guyana, Suriname, and French Guiana
