= Uleanthus =

Scientific classification
- Kingdom: Plantae
- Clade: Tracheophytes
- Clade: Angiosperms
- Clade: Eudicots
- Clade: Rosids
- Order: Fabales
- Family: Fabaceae
- Subfamily: Faboideae
- Tribe: Angylocalyceae
- Genus: Uleanthus; Harms
- Species: U. erythrinoides

Binomial name
- Uleanthus erythrinoides Harms

Genus of legumes

Uleanthus erythrinoides is a species of flowering plant in the family Fabaceae. It is a tree native to northern Brazil. It is the only member of the genus Uleanthus. It belongs to the subfamily Faboideae.
