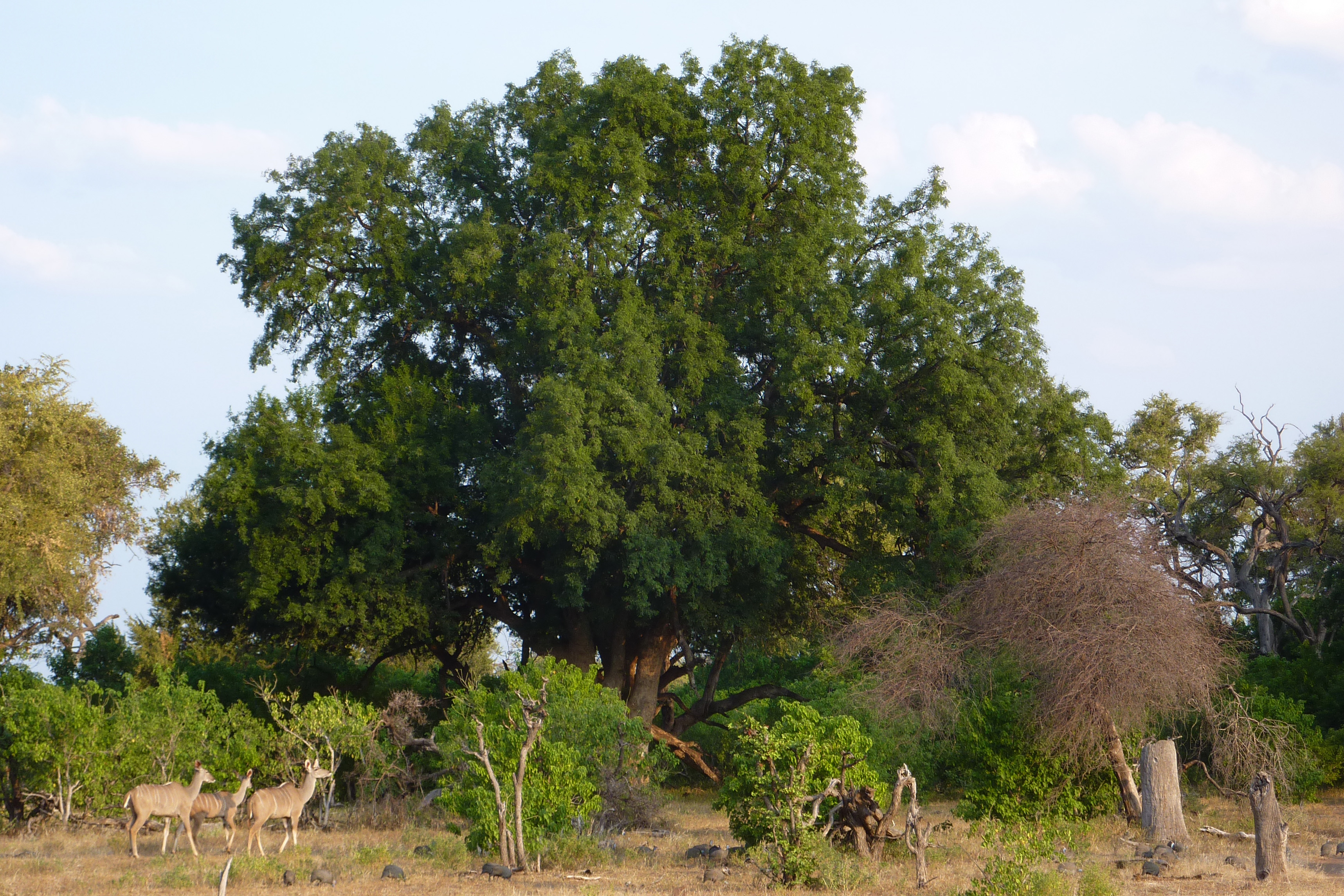

Conservation status
- Least Concern (IUCN 3.1)

Scientific classification
- Kingdom: Plantae
- Clade: Tracheophytes
- Clade: Angiosperms
- Clade: Eudicots
- Clade: Rosids
- Order: Fabales
- Family: Fabaceae
- Subfamily: Faboideae
- Genus: Xanthocercis
- Species: X. zambesiaca

Binomial name
- Xanthocercis zambesiaca (Baker) Dumaz-le-Grand

Synonyms
- Pseudocadia zambesiaca (Baker) Harms; Sophora zambesiaca Baker

= Xanthocercis zambesiaca =

Nyala tree

Species of plant

Xanthocercis zambesiaca, the nyala tree or mshatu, is a species of legume in the family Fabaceae which is native to the southern subtropics of Africa. It occurs in seasonally hot, low-lying river valleys of Botswana, Malawi, Mozambique, South Africa, Zambia and Zimbabwe.

Nyala trees grow on alluvium or termite mounds where they have access to plentiful moisture and deep, fertile soil. They occur sparsely in the eastern lowveld of Southern Africa, but are more prolific in the Limpopo valley and along the Tuli Block's Shashe River, where they are known as mshatu trees. The foliage and fruit, which ripen in autumn and winter, provide food for various vertebrates.

The Nyala tree is a phreatophyte – it indicates the presence of ground water. The wood of a nyala tree can be worked, finishing with a smooth appearance, but irritates the nose and throat in the process.

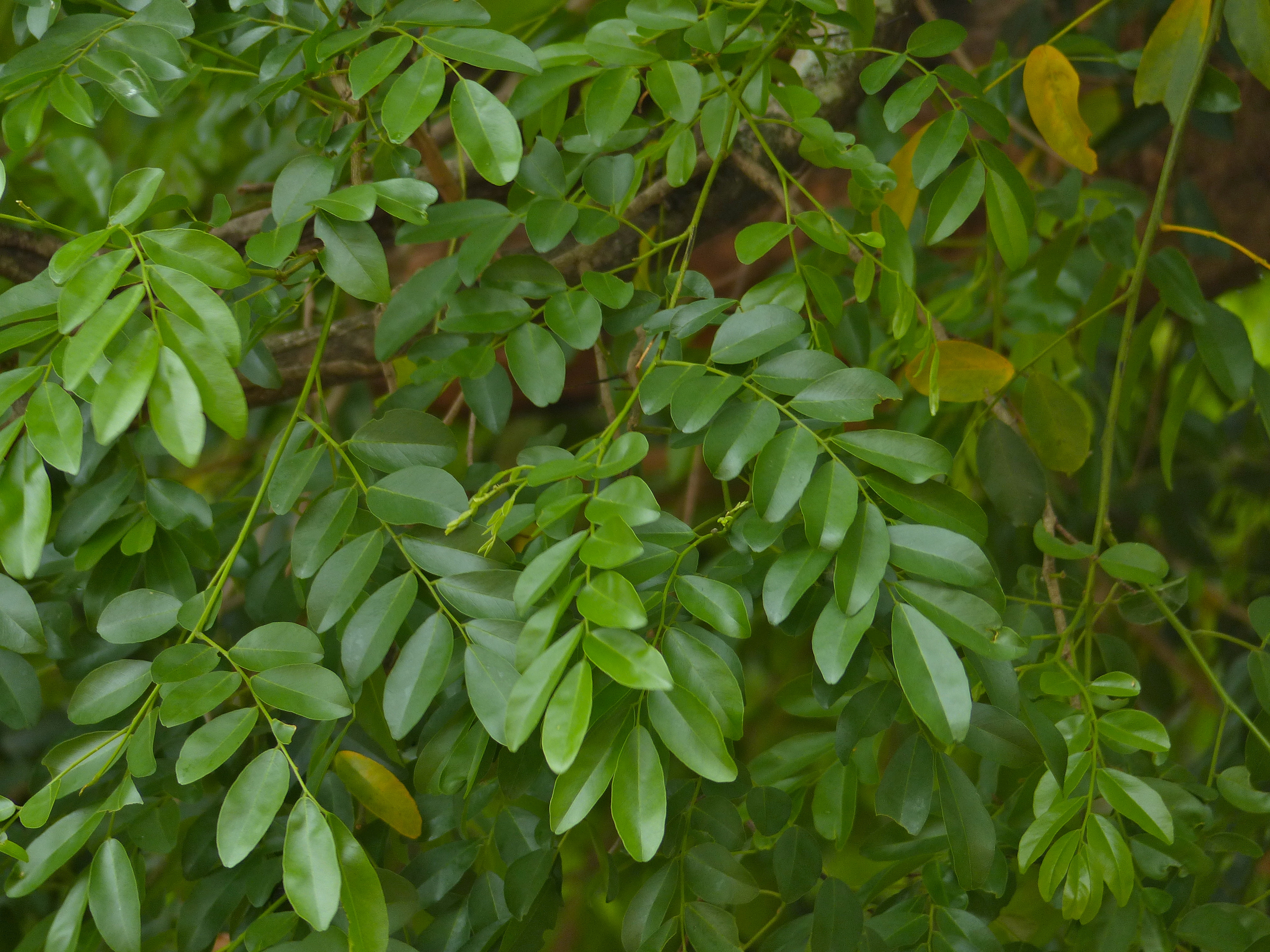
imparipinnate leaves

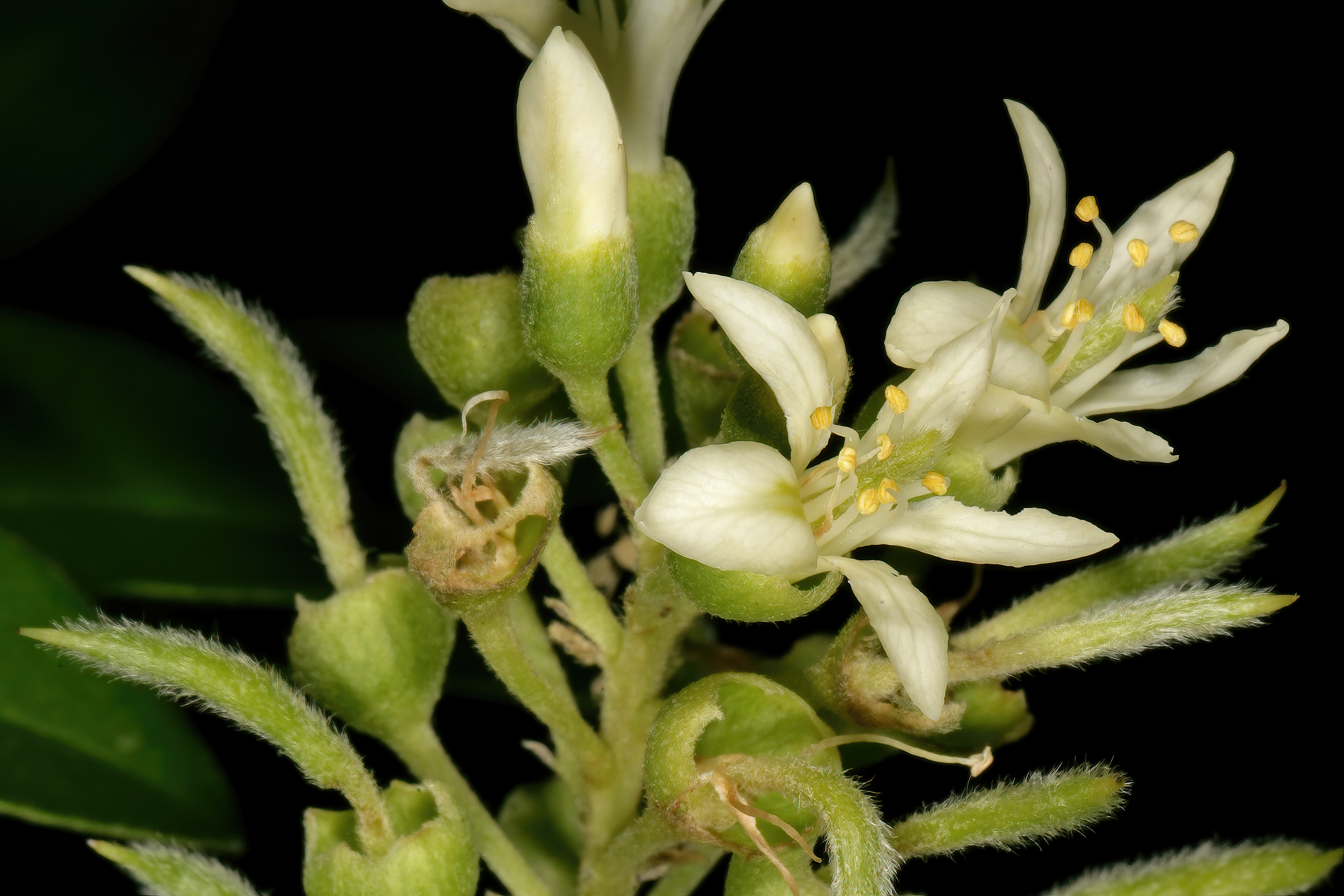
open flowers, standard petals nearest

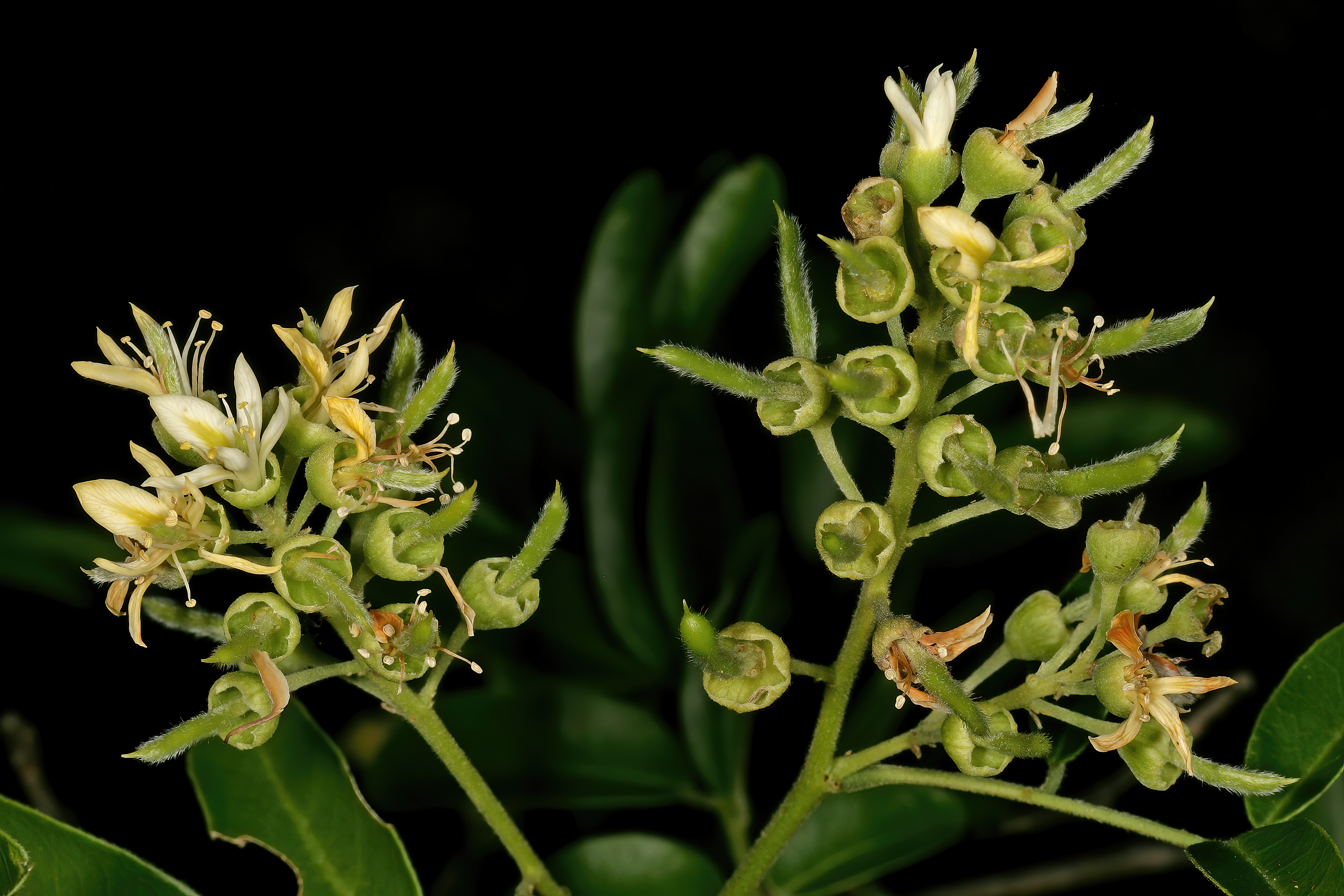
infructescences with green fruit

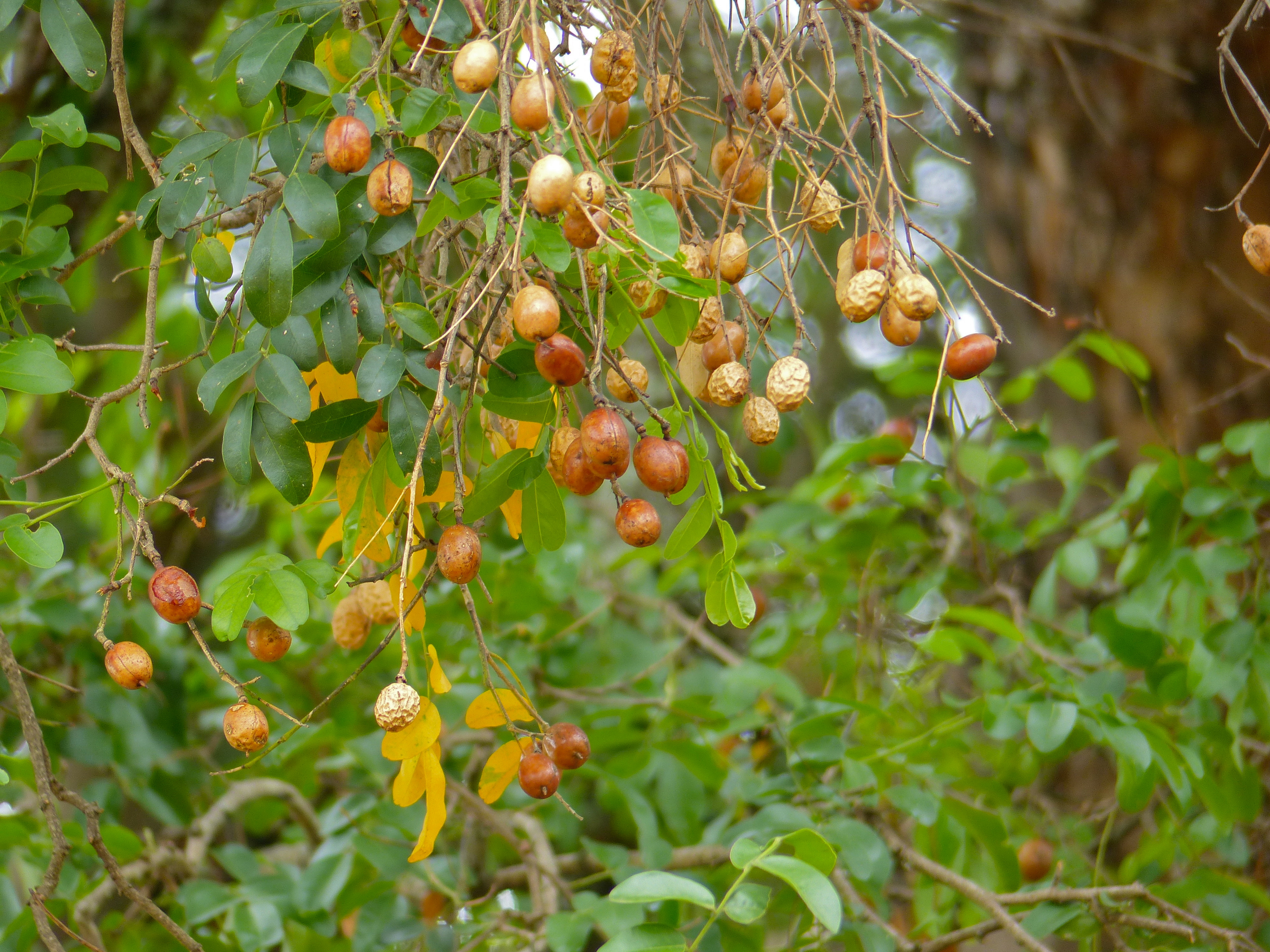
the fruit are drupaceous, not pods
