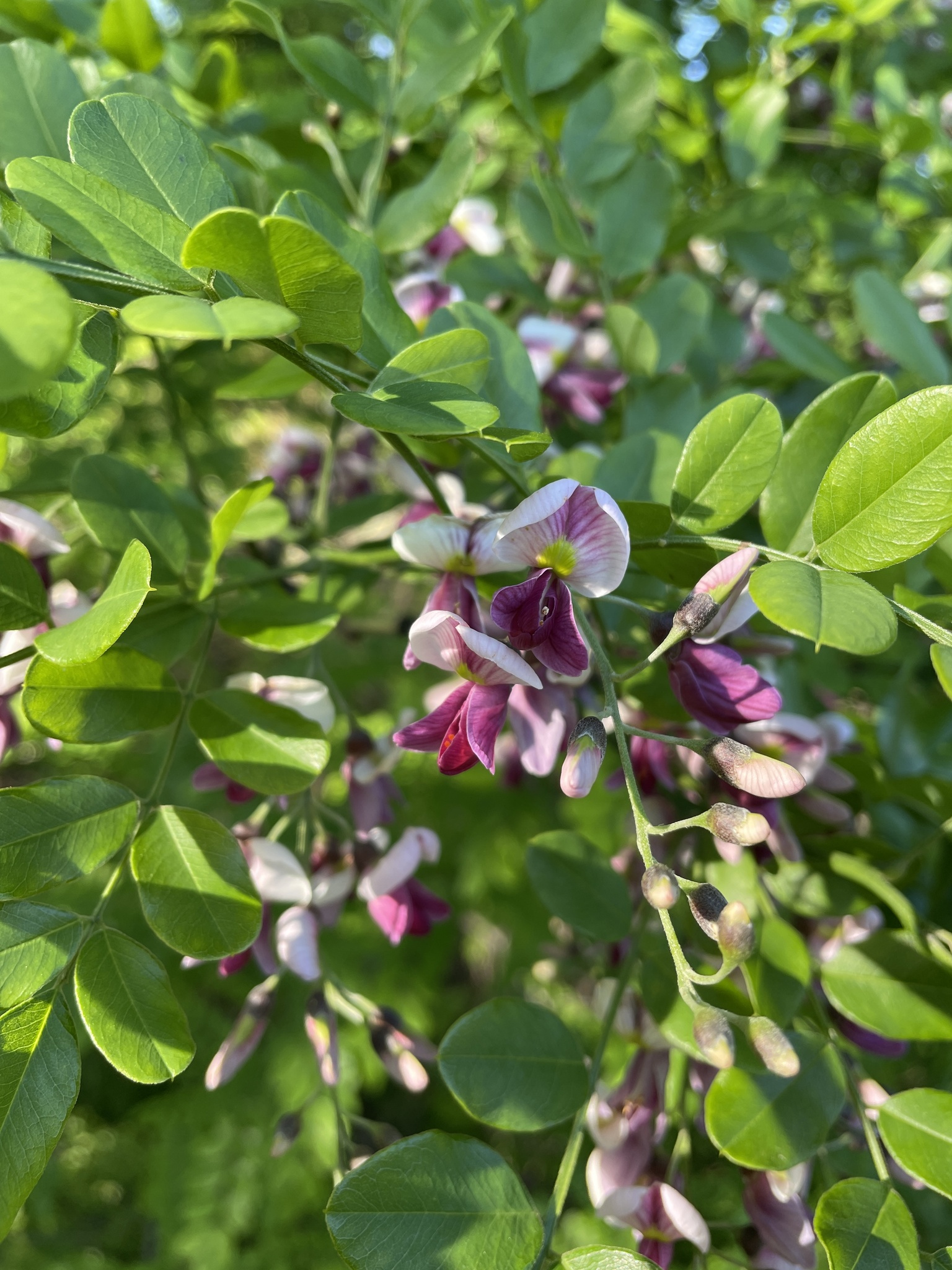
- In bloom
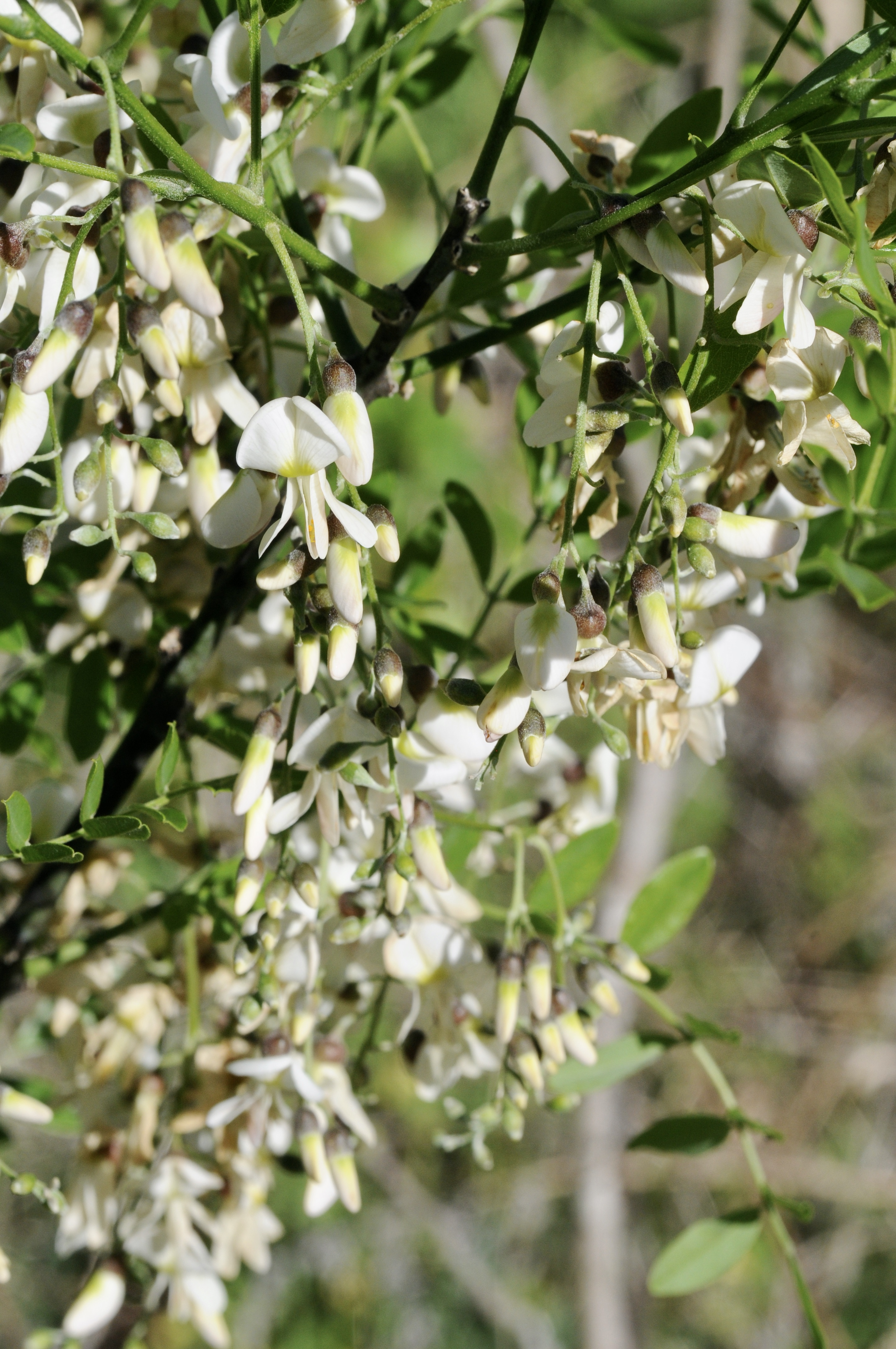
- A white-flowered individual

Scientific classification
- Kingdom: Plantae
- Clade: Embryophytes
- Clade: Tracheophytes
- Clade: Spermatophytes
- Clade: Angiosperms
- Clade: Eudicots
- Clade: Rosids
- Order: Fabales
- Family: Fabaceae
- Subfamily: Faboideae
- Genus: Styphnolobium
- Species: S. affine

Binomial name
- Styphnolobium affine (Torr. & A.Gray) Walp.

Synonyms
- Sophora affinis Torr. & A.Gray

= Styphnolobium affine =

Species of plant

Styphnolobium affine, called Eve's necklace or Eve's necklacepod, is a species of flowering plant in the family Fabaceae. It is native to the U.S. states of Oklahoma, Texas, Arkansas, and Louisiana. A large shrub or small deciduous tree reaching at most 30 ft (9 m), usually half that, it prefers dry, limestone soils and light shade. It is valued as an ornamental for its aromatic, pink or white cascade of blooms, and subsequent strings of bead-like seedpods.
