= Xanthocercis rabiensis =

Conservation status
- Vulnerable (IUCN 2.3)

Scientific classification
- Kingdom: Plantae
- Clade: Tracheophytes
- Clade: Angiosperms
- Clade: Eudicots
- Clade: Rosids
- Order: Fabales
- Family: Fabaceae
- Subfamily: Faboideae
- Genus: Xanthocercis
- Species: X. rabiensis

Binomial name
- Xanthocercis rabiensis Maesen

Species of legume

Xanthocercis rabiensis is a species of flowering plant in the family Fabaceae. It is found only in Gabon.
