= Xanthocercis madagascariensis =

Conservation status
- Least Concern (IUCN 3.1)

Scientific classification
- Kingdom: Plantae
- Clade: Tracheophytes
- Clade: Angiosperms
- Clade: Eudicots
- Clade: Rosids
- Order: Fabales
- Family: Fabaceae
- Subfamily: Faboideae
- Genus: Xanthocercis
- Species: X. madagascariensis

Binomial name
- Xanthocercis madagascariensis Baill.

Synonyms
- Cadia anomala Vatke; Pseudocadia anomala (Vatke) Harms

Species of legume

Xanthocercis madagascariensis is a species of flowering plant in the family Fabaceae. It is found only in Madagascar.
