= Angylocalyx braunii =

Conservation status
- Vulnerable (IUCN 2.3)

Scientific classification
- Kingdom: Plantae
- Clade: Tracheophytes
- Clade: Angiosperms
- Clade: Eudicots
- Clade: Rosids
- Order: Fabales
- Family: Fabaceae
- Subfamily: Faboideae
- Genus: Angylocalyx
- Species: A. braunii

Binomial name
- Angylocalyx braunii Harms

Species of legume

Angylocalyx braunii is a species of flowering plant in the family Fabaceae. It is found in Kenya and Tanzania.
