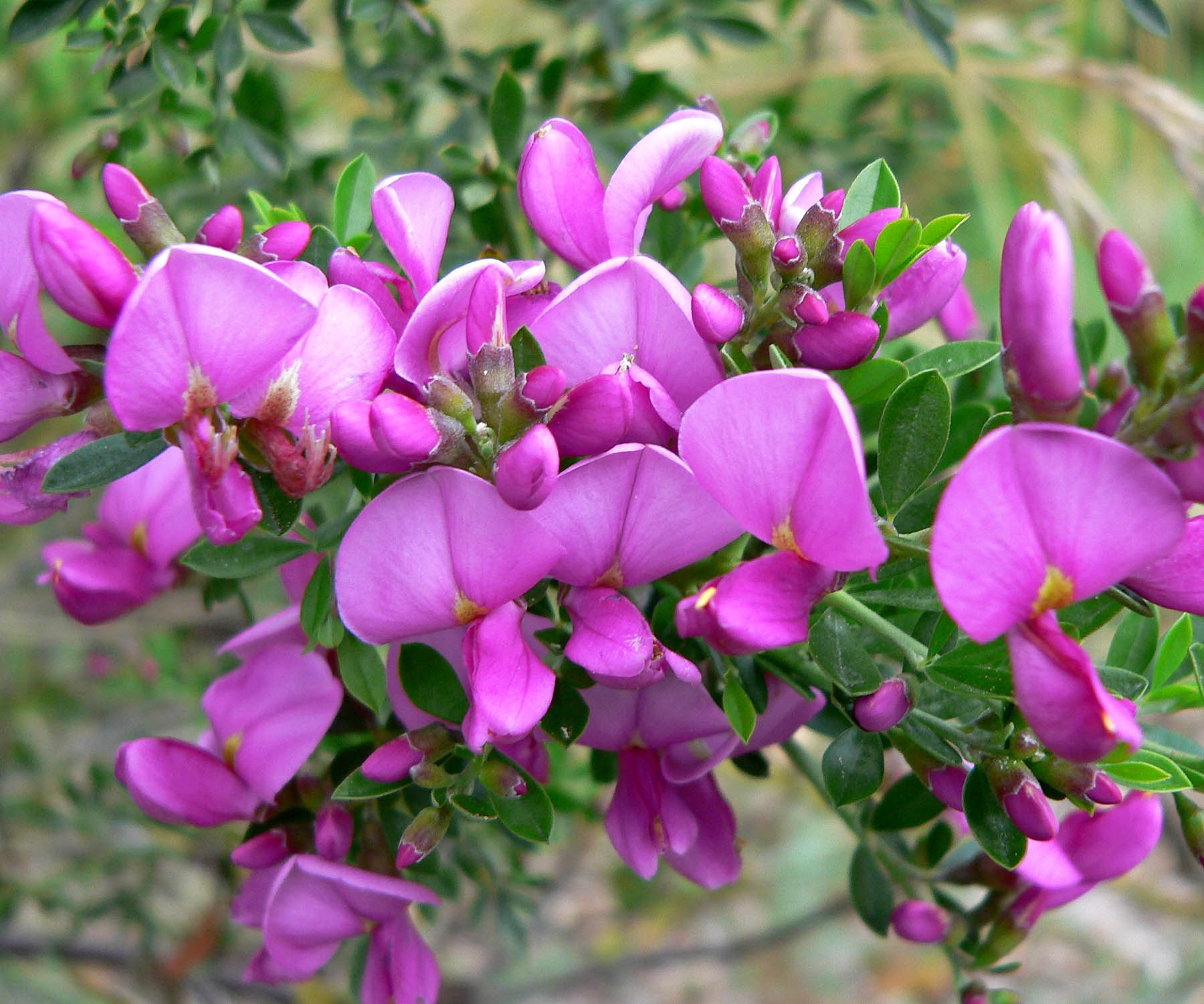
- Pickeringia montana

Scientific classification
- Kingdom: Plantae
- Clade: Tracheophytes
- Clade: Angiosperms
- Clade: Eudicots
- Clade: Rosids
- Order: Fabales
- Family: Fabaceae
- Subfamily: Faboideae
- Clade: Cladrastis clade (Wojciechowski et al. 2004) Wojciechowski 2013

Genera
- Cladrastis Raf. 1824; Pickeringia Nuttall 1840; Styphnolobium Schott 1830

Synonyms
- Sophoreae sensu Polhill, 1981 pro parte 3

= Cladrastis clade =

Clade of legumes

The Cladrastis clade is a monophyletic clade of the flowering plant subfamily Faboideae (or Papilionaceae) that is found in eastern Asia and southern North America. It is consistently resolved in molecular phylogenies and is sister to the Meso-Papilionoideae. Evidence for the existence of this clade was first proposed based on morphological (floral), cytological, and biochemical evidence. It is predicted to have diverged from the other legume lineages 47.4±2.6 million years ago (in the Eocene).

== Description ==
This clade is composed of three genera: Cladrastis, the monotypic Pickeringia, and Styphnolobium. Fossils of species of Cladrastis and Styphnolobium have been discovered. The name of this clade is informal and is not assumed to have any particular taxonomic rank like the names authorized by the ICBN or the ICPN. The clade is defined as:

"The most inclusive crown clade containing Cladrastis kentukea (Dum. Cours.) Rudd 1971 but not Dermatophyllum secundiflorum (Ortega) Gandhi & Reveal 2011 or Swartzia simplex Spreng. 1825."
