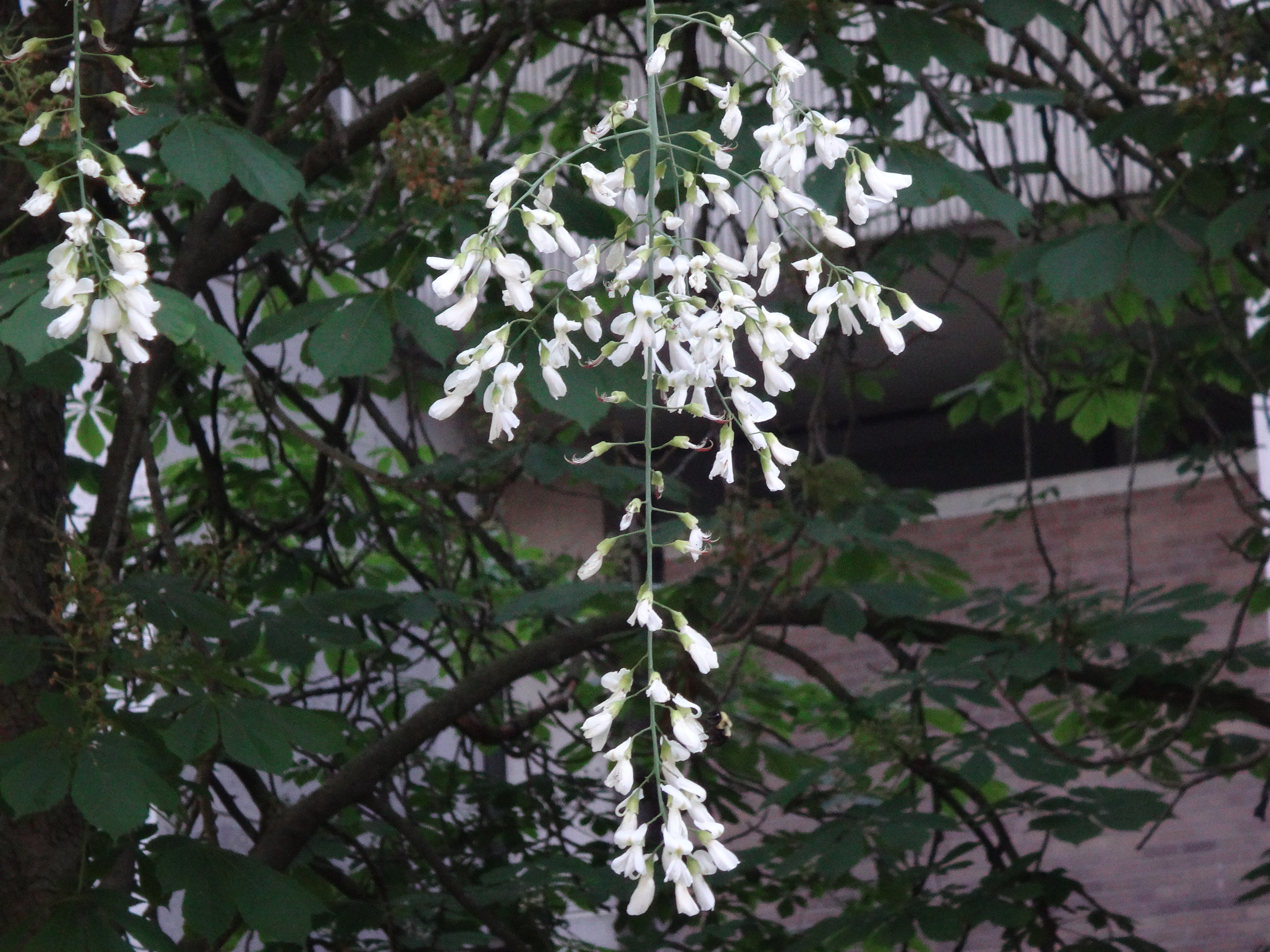
- Kentucky yellowwood flowers

Conservation status
- Least Concern (IUCN 3.1)

- Apparently Secure (NatureServe)

Scientific classification
- Kingdom: Plantae
- Clade: Tracheophytes
- Clade: Angiosperms
- Clade: Eudicots
- Clade: Rosids
- Order: Fabales
- Family: Fabaceae
- Subfamily: Faboideae
- Genus: Cladrastis
- Species: C. kentukea

Binomial name
- Cladrastis kentukea (Dum.Cours.) Rudd (1971)
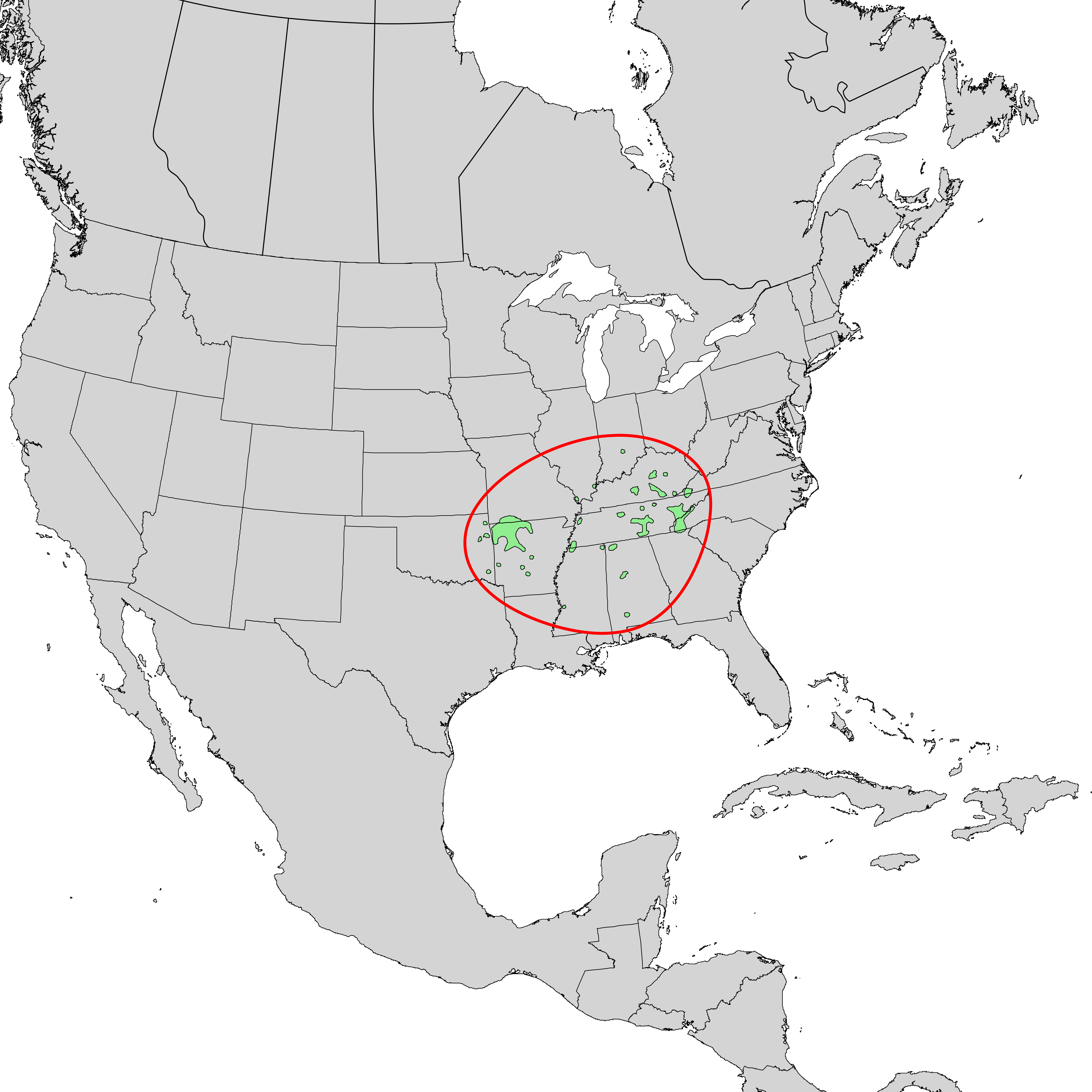
- Natural range of Cladrastis kentukea
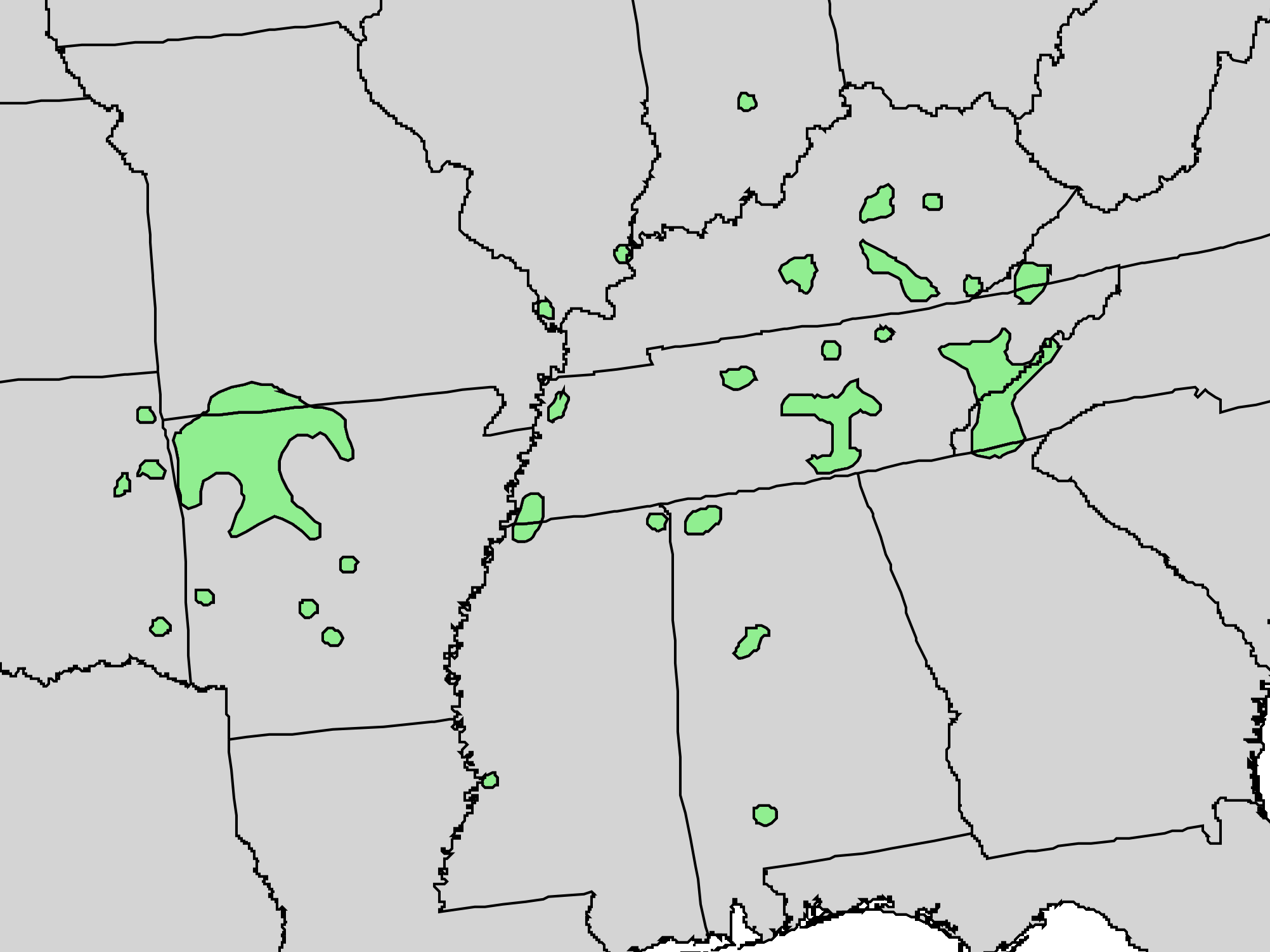
- Close-up of natural range of Cladrastis kentukea

Synonyms
- Cladrastis albiflora Raf.; Cladrastis fragrans Raf.; Cladrastis kentuckensis (Dum.Cours.) Jacks.; Cladrastis kentuckensis Raf.; Cladrastis kentuckensis Raf. ex B.D. Jacks.; Cladrastis lutea (Michx.) K.Koch; Cladrastis lutea Raf.; Cladrastis tinctoria Raf.; Sophora kentukea Dum.Cours.; Virgilia alba Raf.; Virgilia kentuckensis Raf.; Virgilia lutea Michx.

= Cladrastis kentukea =

Species of legume

Cladrastis kentukea, the Kentucky yellowwood or American yellowwood (syn. C. lutea, C. tinctoria), is a species of Cladrastis native to the Southeastern United States, with a restricted range from western North Carolina west to eastern Oklahoma, and from southern Missouri and Indiana south to central Alabama. Historically, the tree was placed into the genus Virgilia, not to be confused with the present genus of African legume trees by that name.

== Description ==
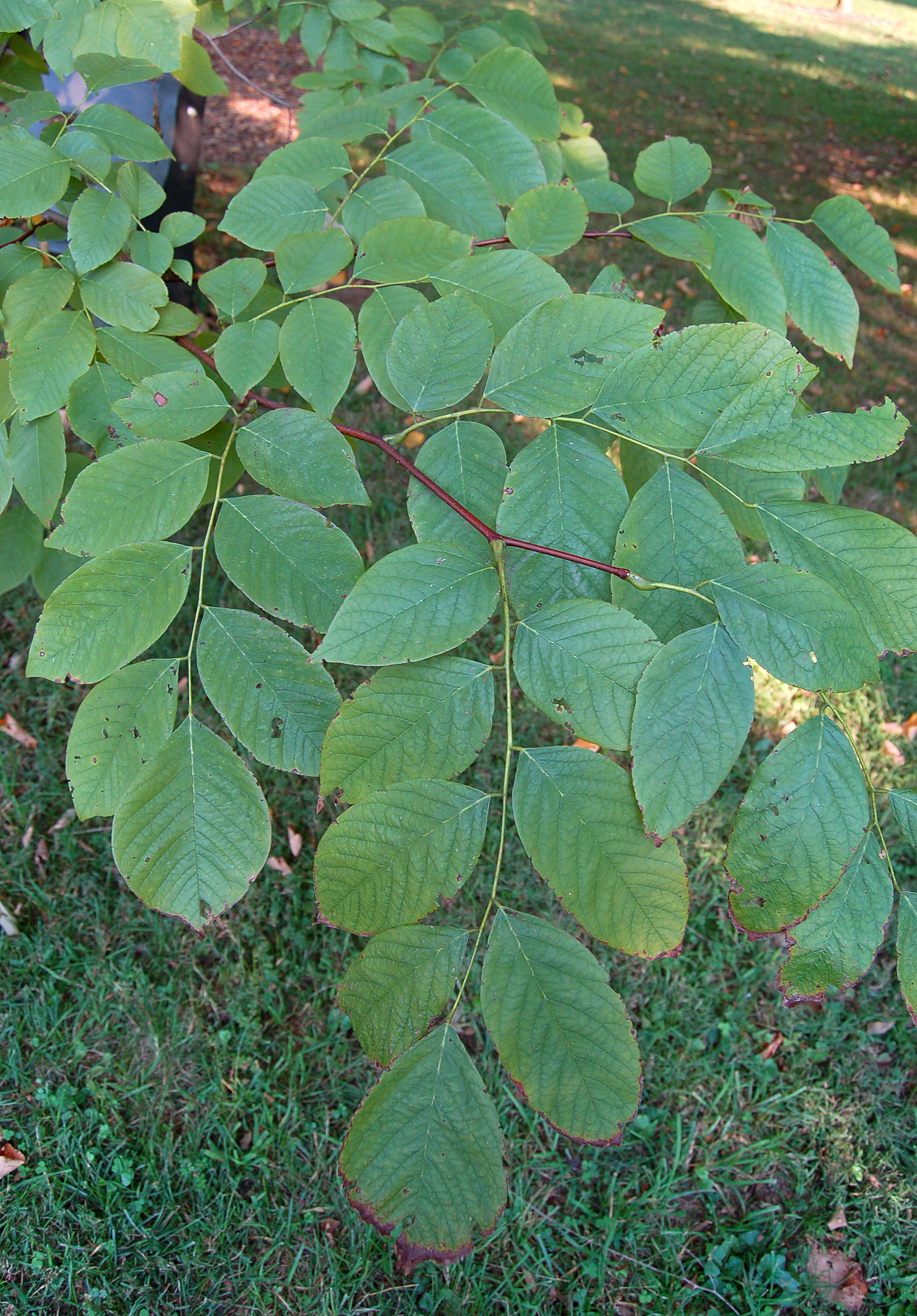
Leaves

Cladrastis kentukea is a small to medium-sized deciduous tree typically growing 10–15 metres (33–49 ft) tall, exceptionally to 27 metres (89 ft) tall, with a broad, rounded crown and smooth gray bark. The leaves are compound pinnate, 20–30 cm (7.9–11.8 in) long, with 5-11 (mostly 7-9) alternately arranged leaflets; each leaflet broad ovate with an acute apex; 6–13 cm (2.4–5.1 in) long and 3–7 cm (1.2–2.8 in) broad, with an entire margin and a thinly to densely hairy underside. In the fall, the leaves turn a mix of yellow, gold, and orange.

The flowers are fragrant, white, produced in Wisteria-like racemes 15–30 cm (5.9–11.8 in) long. Flowering is in early summer (June in its native region), and is variable from year to year, with heavy flowering every second or third year. The fruit is a pod 5–8 cm (2.0–3.1 in) long, containing 2-6 seeds.

- Bark: Smooth gray, or light brown. Branchlets at first downy, but soon become smooth, light yellowish green; later red brown, finally dark brown.
- Wood: Yellow to pale brown; heavy, hard, close-grained and strong. Sp. gr., 0.6278; weight of cu. ft., 39.12 lb (17.74 kg).
- Winter buds: Four in a group, making a tiny cone and enclosed in the hollow base of the petiole.
- Leaves: Alternate, pinnately compound, 8 to 12 in (20 to 30 cm) long, main stem stout, enlarged at base. Leaflets seven to eleven, broadly oval, 3 to 4 in (7.6 to 10.2 cm) long. Wedge-shaped at base, entire, acute, terminal leaflets rhomboid-ovate. Feather-veined, midrib and primary veins prominent, grooved above, light yellow beneath. They come out the bud pale green, downy; when full grown are dark green above, pale beneath. In autumn they turn a bright clear yellow.
- Flowers: June. Perfect, papilionaceous, white, borne in drooping terminal panicles 12 to 14 in (30 to 36 cm) long, 5 to 6 in (13 to 15 cm) broad, slightly fragrant.
- Calyx: Campanulate, five-lobed, enlarged on the upper side.
- Corolla: Papilionaceous; standard broad, white, marked on the inner surface with a pale yellow blotch; wings oblong; keel petals free.
- Stamens: Ten, free; filaments thread-like.
- Pistil: Ovary superior, linear, bright red, hairy, bearing a long incurved style.
- Fruit: Legume, smooth, linear-compressed, tipped with the remnants of the styles. Seeds four to six, dark brown.

== Distribution ==
Cladrastis kentukea is one of the rarest trees of eastern North America. It is found principally on the limestone cliffs of Kentucky, Tennessee, and North Carolina, but it is hardy as far north as zone 4.

The largest specimen known is at Spring Grove Cemetery in Cincinnati, Ohio, 22 m (72 ft) tall and 2.2 m (7 ft 3 in) trunk diameter; the tallest known is a slender tree 27 m (89 ft) tall but only 0.55 m (1 ft 10 in) trunk diameter, at Plott Cove Research Natural Area, Georgia.

Some specimens from Alabama, whose young leaves have especially hairy undersides, have been distinguished as Cladrastis kentukea f. tomentosa (Steyermark) Spongberg. However, this variation is not considered significant.

== Cultivation ==
Cladrastis kentukea is widely grown as an ornamental tree for its attractive flowers, and is locally naturalized in many areas of the eastern United States outside of its restricted native range. It thrives in full sunlight and in well-drained soil, tolerates high pH soils as well as acid situations. The Yellowwood can withstand urban settings and is attractive to birds. A number of cultivars have been selected, including 'Perkin's Pink' (syn. 'Rosea', an invalid name) with pink flowers.

Kentucky yellowwood is recommended as one of the best medium-sized trees for cultivation as an ornamental plant in gardens. The only quality that is mentioned is a tendency of the trunk to divide very near the ground, as a multi-trunked tree.

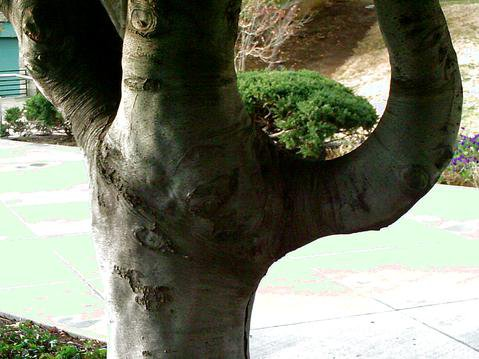
bark and low branching habit

== Uses ==
The name yellowwood derives from its yellow heartwood, used in small amounts for specialist furniture, gunstocks and decorative woodturning.

This plant has been marked as a pollinator plant, supporting and attracting bees and butterflies.

== Distinctions ==
Yellowwood won a Pennsylvania Horticultural Society Gold Award in 1994.

The Society of Municipal Arborists selected the yellowwood (Cladrastis kentukea or C. lutea) as its Urban Tree of the Year for 2015.
