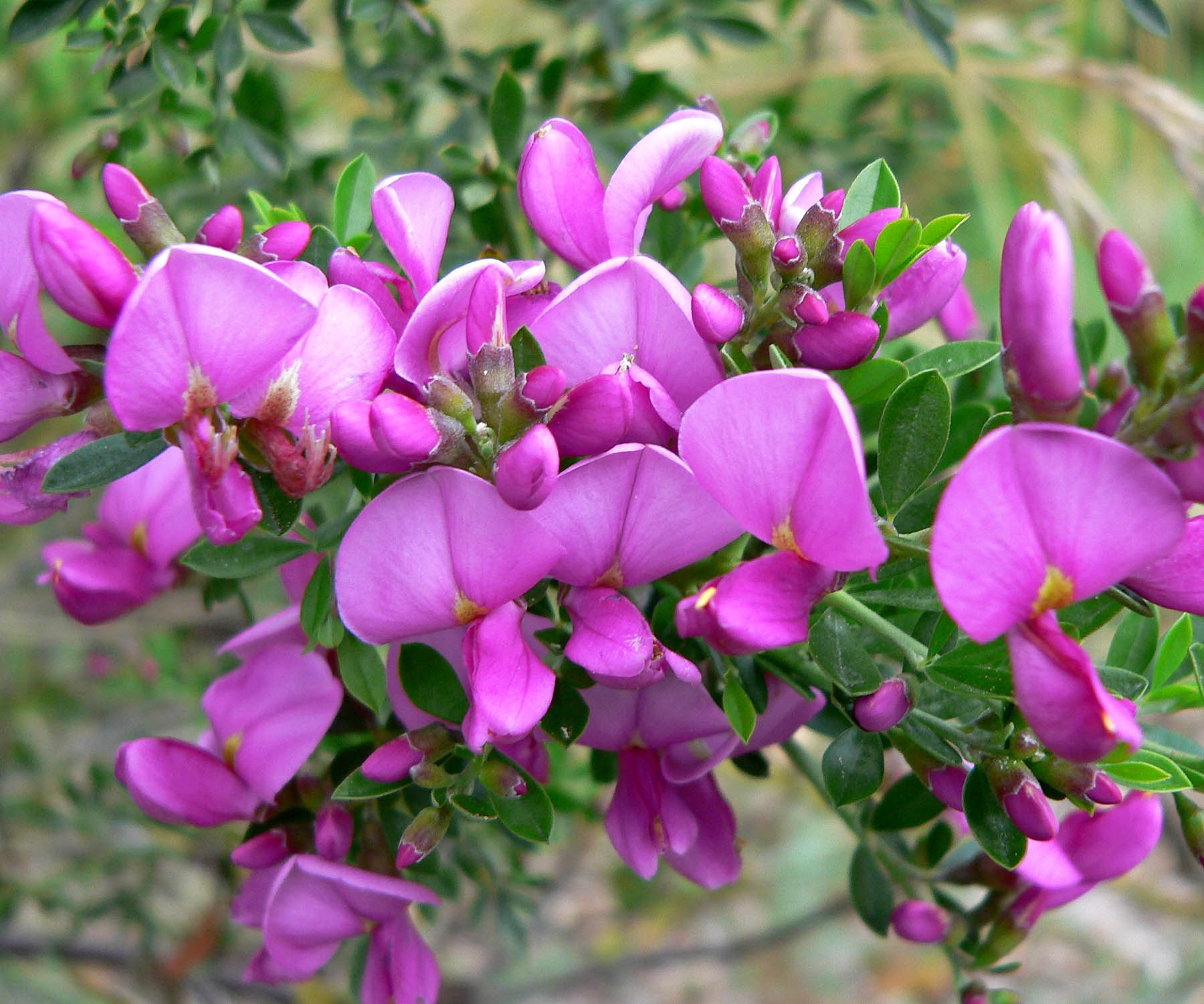

Conservation status
- Secure (NatureServe)

Scientific classification
- Kingdom: Plantae
- Clade: Tracheophytes
- Clade: Angiosperms
- Clade: Eudicots
- Clade: Rosids
- Order: Fabales
- Family: Fabaceae
- Subfamily: Faboideae
- Clade: Cladrastis clade
- Genus: Pickeringia; Nutt ex Torr & A. Gray
- Species: P. montana

Binomial name
- Pickeringia montana Torr & A. Gray

Subspecies
- See text

Synonyms
- Pickeringia Nutt.; Pickeringia montana var. tomentosa (Abrams) I. M. Johnst.; Xylothermia Greene; Xylothermia montana (Torr. & A. Gray) Greene; Xylothermia montana subsp. tomentosa Abrams

= Pickeringia =

Genus of legumes

Pickeringia is a monotypic genus of flowering plants in the legume family, Fabaceae. It was recently assigned to the unranked, monophyletic Cladrastis clade. It was named after the naturalist Charles Pickering. Its only species is Pickeringia montana, which is known by the common name chaparral pea. It is native to California, where its distribution extends along the Coast Ranges and the Sierra Nevada foothills, as well as the Peninsular Ranges of Southern California and northern Baja California. It is also known from Santa Cruz Island.

It is one of very few legumes native to the chaparral habitat. Its nitrogen-fixing ability helps it thrive in rocky, sandy soil. The plant is also well-suited to a landscape of hills, slopes, and recently burned areas; its roots spread quickly and help anchor loose soil, preventing erosion.

== Description ==
The chaparral pea rarely sprouts from seed. More often it sends up new stems from roots growing outward from the mother plant. It forms low, dense, thorny thickets of shiny dark green leaves. In spring and summer the plant blooms in bright magenta flowers. It bears pods containing pealike seeds.

There are two subspecies of chaparral pea:

- Pickeringia montana subsp. montana is widespread in California.
- Pickeringia montana subsp. tomentosa, sometimes called woolly chaparral pea, is limited to the hills of southern California.
