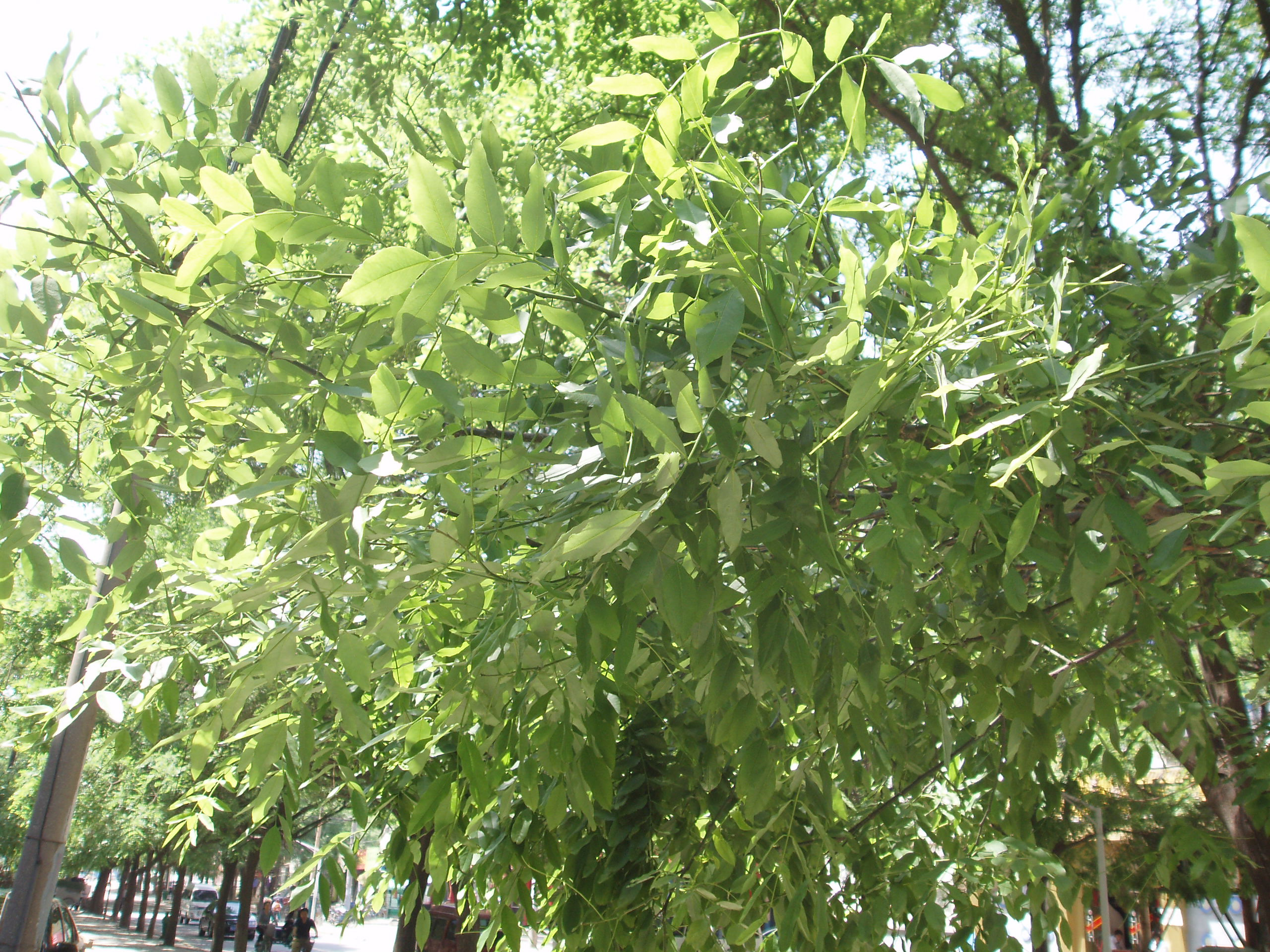
- Styphnolobium japonicum foliage

Scientific classification
- Kingdom: Plantae
- Clade: Tracheophytes
- Clade: Angiosperms
- Clade: Eudicots
- Clade: Rosids
- Order: Fabales
- Family: Fabaceae
- Subfamily: Faboideae
- Clade: Cladrastis clade
- Genus: Styphnolobium; Schott (1829)

Type species
- Styphnolobium japonicum (L.) Schott

Species
- 9; see text

Synonyms
- Sophora sect. Styphnolobium (Schott) Yaklovev

= Styphnolobium =

Genus of legumes

Styphnolobium is a genus of flowering plants in the pea family, Fabaceae. It includes nine species of small trees and shrubs native to China and to the Americas, from the southern United States to Colombia. It belongs to subfamily Faboideae, and was formerly included within a broader interpretation of the genus Sophora. It was recently assigned to the unranked, monophyletic Cladrastis clade. They differ from the genus Calia (mescalbeans) in having deciduous leaves and flowers in axillary, not terminal, racemes. The leaves are pinnate, with 9–21 leaflets, and the flowers in pendulous racemes similar to those of the black locust. Necklacepod is a common name for plants in this genus.

== Etymology ==
From Greek styphno-, stryphno- "sour, astringent" and lobion "pod", because of the fresh pods' pulp taste.

== Species ==
Styphnolobium has the following species:

=== Section Oresbios ===
- Styphnolobium affine (Torr. & A. Gray) Walp., the Eve's necklace, is native to the southern United States in Texas, Oklahoma, Arkansas and Louisiana. It is a large shrub or small tree, growing to 5–7 m tall, with white or pale violet flowers. The seeds of this species are believed to be poisonous. The sapwood leaches a yellow dye on contact with water.
- Styphnolobium burseroides M. Sousa & Rudd
- Styphnolobium caudatum M. Sousa & Rudd is native to Nicaragua.
- Styphnolobium conzattii (Standl.) M. Sousa & Rudd
- Styphnolobium monteviridis M. Sousa & Rudd is native to Central America.
- Styphnolobium parviflorum M. Sousa & Rudd
- Styphnolobium protantherum M. Sousa & Rudd
- Styphnolobium sporadicum M. Sousa & Rudd

=== Section Styphnolobium ===
- Styphnolobium japonicum (L.) Schott, the pagoda tree (Chinese scholar, Japanese pagodatree; syn. Sophora japonica), is native to eastern Asia (mainly China; despite the name, it is introduced in Japan), is a popular ornamental tree in Europe, North America and South Africa, grown for its white flowers, borne in late summer after most other flowering trees have long finished flowering. It grows into a lofty tree 10–20 m tall with an equal spread, and produces a fine, dark brown timber.

== Uses ==
The pagoda tree is widely used in bonsai gardening. The Guilty Chinese Scholartree was a historic pagoda tree in Beijing, on which the last emperor of the Ming dynasty, Chongzhen, hanged himself.

Styphnolobium japonicum (Chinese: 槐; pinyin: huái; formerly Sophora japonica) is one of the 50 fundamental herbs used in traditional Chinese medicine.
