= Robert Moore (gambler) =

New Zealand professional gambler

- Born: c. 1953; New Zealand
- Died: 18 October 1997 (aged 44); Happy Valley, Hong Kong
- Occupations: Businessman gambler
- Spouse: Joane Chua
- Children: 1

Robert "Bob" Moore (c. 1953 – 18 October 1997) was a New Zealand professional gambler who focused on horse race betting where he earned his fortune. Moore had worked with Alan Woods and Bill Benter to develop computerized systems which successfully predicted the outcome of horse races.

== Gambling career ==
Moore arrived in Hong Kong in 1983 with only AUD$5 on him. There, he worked with Alan Woods, a successful blackjack player, and devised a system for betting on the outcome of horse races. Moore made a fortune and was known for his flamboyance. Moore allegedly bought a bar from the owner to fire a manager who asked him to wait in line for a pool table. Another story about Moore involved a Hong Kong pool bar called the Flying Pig. After being annoyed with waiting for one of the two pool tables at the bar, Moore threatened the owners that he would purchase the Chinese restaurant downstairs and open a bar with three pool tables, which he did. According to Woods, such behavior cost Moore millions.

Moore often wagered up to $2 million per day on horse races and received an annual return of 38%.

In 1990, Moore was working with Woods while the two had shared an apartment. Moore left Woods to work for Bill Benter, who had a stronger betting system. Moore later left Benter and attempted to sell Benter's data to Woods.

== Personal life ==
Moore married Joane Chua in 1996. He had a daughter from a previous relationship. Friends said Moore suffered from mood swings and refused to follow his friends' advice of seeking help.

=== Death ===
In 1996, Moore had won approximately HK$40 million from a horse race. Moore later won additional races before his death. He had a disagreement with the Hong Kong Jockey Club resulting in him being barred from any further horse racing activities.

Moore committed suicide on 18 October 1997 by overdosing on sleeping pills and leaving the gas cooker on. Investigators found 10 empty bags for sleeping pills in the kitchen bin. He was discovered by his wife.

== See also ==
- Billy Walters (gambler)
