= Haralabos Voulgaris =

Greek-Canadian professional gambler (born 1975)

- Nickname: Bob
- Born: 4 July 1975 (age 51)

World Series of Poker
- Bracelet: None
- Money finish: 1

World Poker Tour
- Title: None
- Final tables: 2
- Money finishes: 11

European Poker Tour
- Title: None
- Final table: None
- Money finish: 1

Haralabos "Bob" Voulgaris (born 4 July 1975) is a Greek-Canadian professional gambler and principal owner of Spanish football club CD Castellón. Formerly the director of quantitative research and development for the Dallas Mavericks, Voulgaris was considered one of the most prolific NBA sports bettors in the world.

== Early life ==
Haralabos Voulgaris was born in Canada to Greek immigrant parents. His father had a successful Greek restaurant and commercial real estate business in Winnipeg. At 18, he took a gap year, traveling to his parents' birth towns of Argos and Tripoli. He then joined his father in Las Vegas for two months, staying at Caesars Palace.

He studied philosophy at the University of Manitoba.

== Gambling career ==
In addition to NBA betting, Voulgaris is also a poker enthusiast who has cashed for $3.090 million in live tournaments (as of September 2020). He won that sum over the course of 14 years and 19 different events.

One of his biggest wins dates back from September 2007, when he finished 3rd in the $10K NLHE Championship event at the WPT Borgata Open for $434,560.

He came in fourth place in the 2017 WSOP One Drop event for his largest tournament win, pocketing $1,158,883.

Voulgaris also participates in Live Cash Games, and as such, appeared on PokerGO's revived version of Poker After Dark. He played a super high stakes, $300/$600 NLHE cash game session against Phil Galfond, Bill Perkins, and others.

== Dallas Mavericks ==
On 4 October 2018, the Dallas Mavericks hired Voulgaris as Director of Quantitative Research and Development. On 16 June 2021, just two days after an article was released about conflicts involving Voulgaris that had arisen in the front office, conflicting reports surfaced that Voulgaris and the Mavericks parted ways.

== CD Castellón ==
Voulgaris acquired Spanish football club CD Castellón in July 2022. The move came one year after Voulgaris departed his role as Director of Quantitative Research and Development for the Dallas Mavericks. when CD Castellón was playing in Spain's third division, Primera División RFEF – Group 2. When Voulgaris purchased the club, the team had not reached the top-level Spanish football league La Liga in more than three decades. In 2024, the club reached Segunda Division.

== See also ==
- Zeljko Ranogajec
- Bill Benter
- Billy Walters (gambler)
