= Bescot Stadium =

Football stadium

- Pallet-Track Bescot Stadium
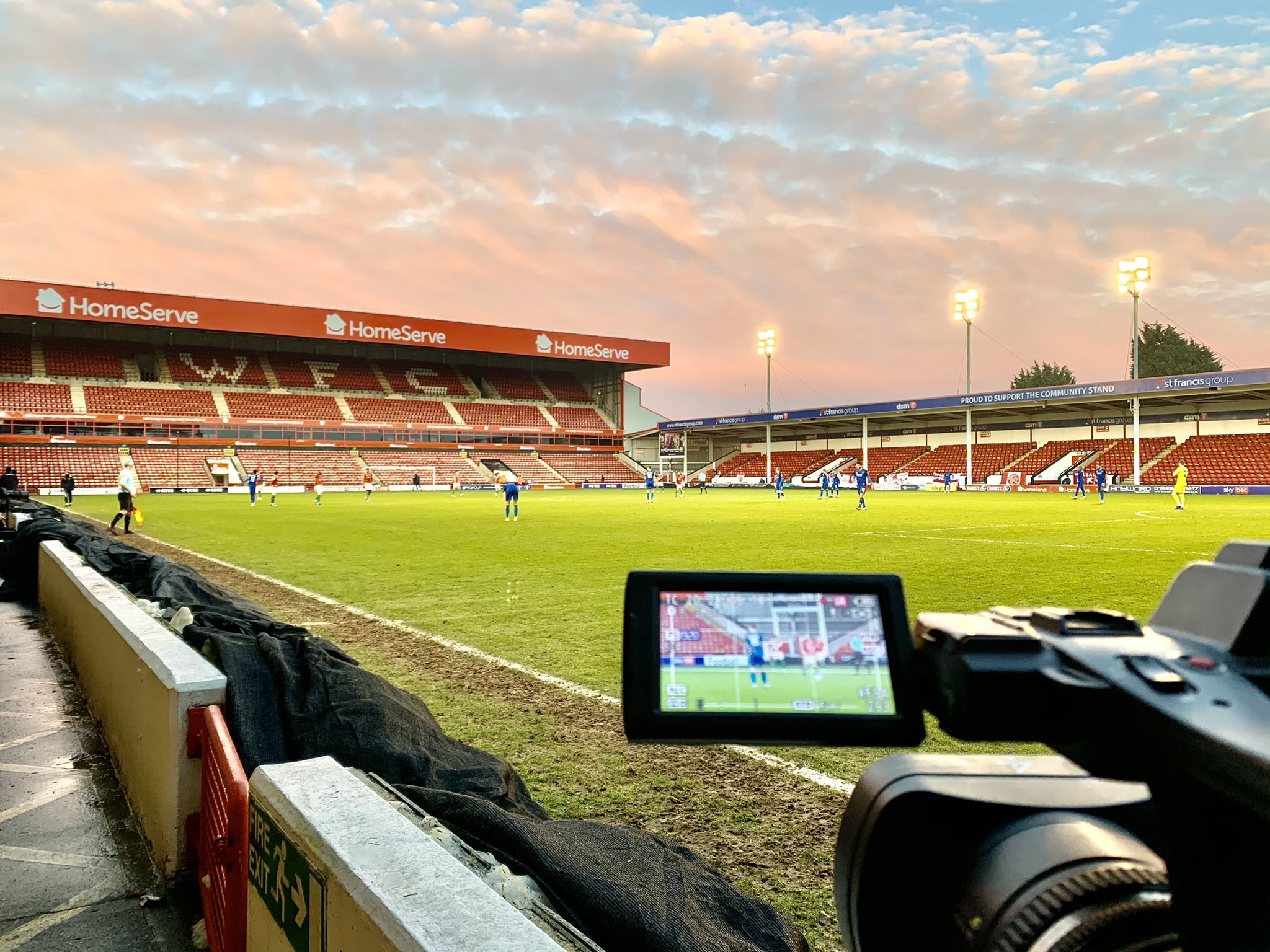
- The Bescot Stadium in 2021
- Interactive map of Bescot Stadium
- Full name: Bescot Stadium
- Former names: Banks's Stadium (2007–2022)
- Address: Bescot Crescent; Bescot; Walsall WS1 4SA; West Midlands; England
- Coordinates: 52.5655°N 1.9909°W
- Owner: Walsall
- Capacity: 11,300
- Surface: Grass
- Record attendance: 11,049; Walsall v Rotherham United; 9 May 2004
- Public transit: Bescot Stadium

Construction
- Built: 1989–1990
- Opened: 18 August 1990
- Cost: £4.5m

Tenants
- Walsall (1990–present); Aston Villa Women (2020–2026) (Note: Cup matches only since the 2024–25 season.)

Bescot Stadium, currently known as the Pallet-Track Bescot Stadium for sponsorship reasons, is a football stadium in the area of Bescot, Walsall, West Midlands, England. With a capacity of 11,300, it is the current home ground of Walsall and Aston Villa Women. It was built in 1989–90 by GMI Construction, with a reported build cost of £4.5m. The stadium replaced the club's previous ground, Fellows Park, which was located a quarter of a mile away and was the club's home for 94 years.

== History ==
Following the takeover of Walsall by Terry Ramsden in 1986, plans were drawn up for the club to move from its antiquated Fellows Park stadium to a new site in the town. In 1988, a site at Bescot Crescent was identified as the location for a new stadium, and work began on the new stadium in 1989 with completion targeted for the start of the 1990–91 season.

The stadium was opened on 18 August 1990, by Sir Stanley Matthews. Aston Villa Ladies played Walsall Ladies prior to the Mens friendly match with neighbours Aston Villa in front of 9,551 spectators. Aston Villa won the match 4–0. The first competitive goal was scored by Aston Villa Ladies, Bev Adams.

The first competitive game was played a week later on 25 August 1990. 5,219 spectators watched Walsall draw 2–2 with Torquay United, with the stadium's first goal being an own goal scored by Walsall defender Matt Bryant after 65 seconds. The first goal scored for Walsall at the stadium was by Stuart Rimmer.

Originally, both ends of the ground were standing areas, and the capacity of the ground was 11,104. However, capacity was reduced to around 9,800 in 1992, when the away supporters terrace was filled with seats. Following an extension to the 'home' end of the ground (formerly known as the Gilbert Alsop Stand), during the 2002–03 season, it is now an all-seater stadium, with a capacity of 11,300.

A sponsorship deal with Banks's Brewery in 2007 saw the name officially changed from the Bescot Stadium to the Banks's Stadium. This sponsorship deal was extended in 2016 until the summer of 2022.

The stadium has been host to England under-21, under-19 and under-17 international matches, Aston Villa reserve team matches, Aston Villa Women matches and England women's international matches. In August 2026, Aston Villa announced that they had moved their "second home" to Hednesford Town's Keys Park, although stated that their relationship with Walsall was still good and some matches may still be played there if scheduling conflicts dictated.

Outside football, the stadium has hosted two concerts. On 22 June 1991, The Wonder Stuff began their Sharing The Love mini-festival tour at the stadium. Twenty-four years later, on 13 June 2015, the stadium hosted its second concert when Elton John played in front of 14,000 fans.

== Facilities ==
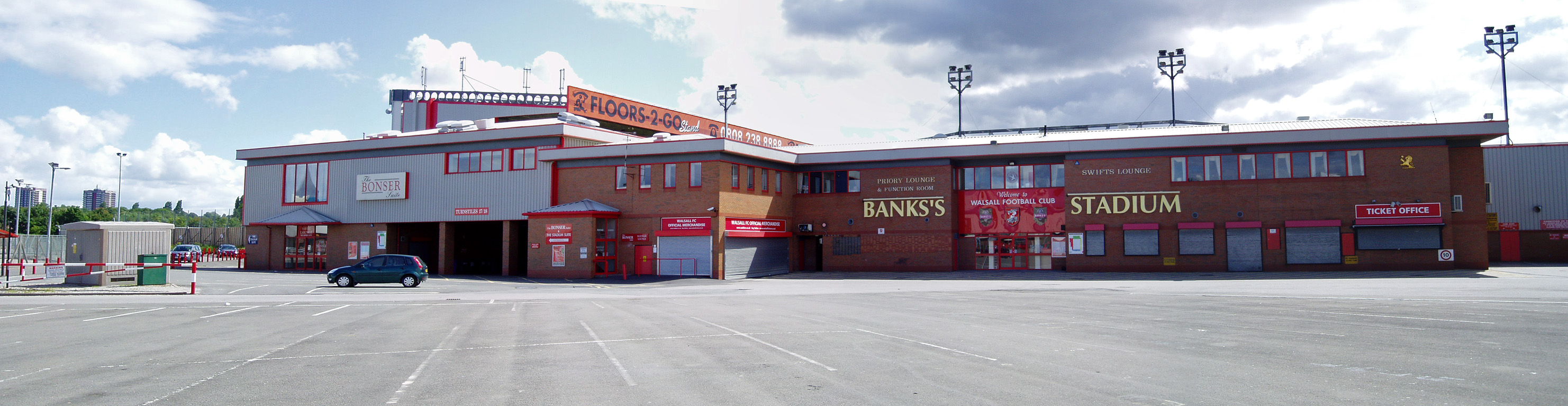
Stadium main entrance as seen from the car park in 2007.

The stadium is situated less than a mile from junction 9 of the M6 motorway, has a mainline railway station within easy walking distance and parking spaces for around 1,200 vehicles.

The Pallet-Track Bescot Stadium has two large conferencing suites – the Bonser Suite and the Stadium Suite. The Bonser Suite adjoins the rear of the Tile Choice Main Stand (formerly the H. L. Fellows Stand), while the Stadium Suite is underneath the upper tier of the northernmost stand (currently the NorthStarr Stand). Both suites host conferences, cabaret evenings, concerts and events.

In addition to this, there are five further bars within the Stadium – the Swifts and Priory Lounges to the rear of the Tile Choice Main Stand, the Mick Kearns community Hub beneath the lower tier of the NorthStarr Stand, a bar beneath the University of Wolverhampton away stand, and one beneath the Experienced Energy Solutions Community Stand. There are food and beverage kiosks in all four corners of the ground, whilst the Bonser Suite doubles as a restaurant on match days.

In 2009, the club erected a large advertising hoarding to the south of the southernmost stand, facing the M6 motorway.

== Ownership ==
It was reported in the Express and Star newspaper on 6 June 2008, that Walsall were attempting to sell the stadium to Walsall Council, and renting it back to secure the club's financial future. The council, however, stated they did not have the funds to purchase the ground.

During Spring 2011, the owner of Bescot Stadium, Jeff Bonser, announced via his proxy, Suffolk Life, that the stadium was for sale on the open market. Steve Jenkins, record producer and lifelong Walsall supporter, tried to drum up support for the council to buy the land.

On 11 July 2011, the council voted 28–24 against purchasing the Bescot Stadium.

In December 2022, it was announced that the freehold was purchased from Suffolk Life to the Trivela group. This provided the club with the ground under its ownership for the first time since its construction. The agreement is under a mortgage style arrangement which ultimately provides the club with the ground fully once paid off.

== Future ==
Plans to develop the southernmost stand, usually reserved for away supporters, were announced by the club in 2005. The proposed development would mean using the blueprint of the northernmost stand (currently the Homeserve Stand), which stands opposite it. Funding for the redevelopment was to come, in part, from a large advertising board on the back of the stand facing the M6 motorway. The board would be the largest illuminated sign adjacent to a motorway in Europe. However, due to the club's failure to regain Championship status and the subsequent decline in attendances, the redevelopment plans were put on hold.
