= Richie Arnold =

Australia international rugby union player

- Full name: Richard Arnold
- Born: 1 July 1990 (age 36) Wagga Wagga, Australia
- Height: 2.08 m (6 ft 10 in)
- Weight: 127 kg (20 st 0 lb; 280 lb)
- School: Murwillumbah High School

Rugby union career
- Position: Lock
- Current team: Angoulême
Amateur team(s)
Years	Team	Apps	(Points)
2015	Bond University		
Senior career
Years	Team	Apps	(Points)
2016	Queensland Country	4	(0)
2017	Force	7	(5)
2017	Perth Spirit	2	(0)
2018	Brumbies	10	(5)
2018	Yamaha Júbilo	3	(0)
2019-2025	Toulouse	100	(25)
- Correct as of 14 January 2024
International career
Years	Team	Apps	(Points)
2023-	Australia	9	(5)
- Correct as of 14 January 2024

Richard Arnold (born 1 July 1990) is an Australian professional rugby union player. He plays for Stade Toulousain in the French Top 14 competition. His regular position is lock.

== Family and early life ==
Richie Arnold and his identical twin Rory were born in Wagga Wagga, Australia. Their father Tony was stationed there while in the army. The brothers were raised in Murwillumbah in northern New South Wales where they both played junior rugby league until aged 16.

== Rugby career ==
Richie Arnold followed the path of his brother Rory, joining the Murwillumbah rugby club. He moved to the Gold Coast two years after his brother to play Premier Rugby at the Bond University Rugby Club in 2015. Later that year he joined with Queensland Country and played in Australia's National Rugby Championship.

Arnold then signed with the Western Force squad, but injury and rehabilitation following a shoulder reconstruction preventing him from playing in the 2016 season. He made his Super Rugby debut for the Force against the Crusaders in their 2017 Round 5 clash in Christchurch. Arnold moved to French Top 14 side Stade Toulousain in early 2019.

== Super Rugby statistics ==
As of 3 June 2017

Season	Team	Games	Starts	Sub	Mins	Tries	Cons	Pens	Drops	Points	Yel	Red
2017	Force	7	5	2	341	1	0	0	0	5	2	0
2018	Brumbies	10	3	7	337	1	0	0	0	5	0	0
Total		17	8	9	678	1	0	0	0	10	2	0

== Honours ==
Toulouse

- European Rugby Champions Cup: 2024
