= Zeljko Ranogajec =

Australian gambler and businessman

- Born: 22 May 1961 (age 65); Hobart, Tasmania, Australia
- Other name: John Wilson
- Occupations: Businessman; Professional gambler

Zeljko Ranogajec (born 22 May 1961) is a businessman and professional gambler from Australia. The London-based Ranogajec is known for horse betting, blackjack and other forms of advantage gambling.

== Early life ==
Ranogajec was born in Hobart, Australia, in a family of Croatian immigrants. He was a Commerce and Law student of the University of Tasmania, studying tax, finance and banking, when he began card counting in Blackjack at the Wrest Point Casino. While there, Ranogajec met his future wife and business partner, Shelley Wilson, who was a full-time employee. He subsequently relocated to New South Wales where he transferred his studies to the University of NSW in Sydney from which he eventually dropped out of to concentrate fully on advantage gambling.

== Australian gambling career ==
=== Blackjack ===
According to professional blackjack players, Ranogajec was "one of the most prolific and innovative advantage players of all time". His starting bankroll was allegedly "a few hundred dollars", through which he won "millions". Ranogajec worked with Alan Woods in the 1980s. Eventually, Ranogajec was banned from most casinos in Australia, starting with Wrest Point, the Jupiters Casino on the Gold Coast, and then, after he moved overseas, in the United States as well. All these casino bans earned him the nickname "The Joker". Ranogajec, by that time, was already moving to other areas of advantage play, in any area of gambling where an advantage could be identified.

In 2011, Ranogajec was inducted into the Blackjack Hall of Fame.

=== Keno ===
In 1994, Ranogajec reportedly won a $7.5 million Keno jackpot at the leisure and entertainment complex North Ryde RSL Club, of New South Wales, after reportedly betting "significantly more than $7.5 million" to win it but coming out ahead due to the additional, smaller prizes awarded along the way to winning the jackpot.

=== Horse racing ===
Ranogajec, according to insider accounts, deployed, for his betting activities on horse races, a strategy combined of specific factors: identifying betting opportunities with as high liquidity as possible, meaning betting pools with significant money being bet by the regular gambling public; deploying a "highly sophisticated betting system"; identifying small margins, on which he bets significant amounts of money; and, importantly, closing deals with bookmakers, including industry leader TabCorp, for significant rebates on his bets. The latter has created controversy in the horse betting world, with many punters complaining about the alleged deal. A TabCorp spokesman stated, in response to the media reports, that the corporation "investigated the incidents" and found "no evidence of illegal activity", but reminded the betting public that "the offering of tote-odds betting products by corporate bookmakers has inherent risks of pool manipulation [by large bettors]."

Ranogajec reportedly accounts for 6–8% of Australian bookmaker TabCorp's $10 billion annual revenue. His betting on Betfair is believed to account for one third of the company's Australian operations.

Ranogajec has gradually organised an extensive network of spotters, analysts, bettors and administrators, directing activities from office space he is allegedly occupying in the Fox Sports building at 235 Pyrmont Street, in Sydney's inner suburb of Pyrmont. It is known that he contracts many companies to provide information and does not employ anyone directly. However indirectly due to his information requirements, to gain the edge, he provides employment to over 300 people in Australia.

=== Rebate controversy ===
Ranogajec's success has been revealed to be based upon favorable discounts and rebates that he has negotiated with betting pool operators. In 2011 it was reported that the commercial failure of Tote Tasmania was partly due to the large rebates that Ranogajec had received on his betting turnover. Subsequently, the business was purchased by Tatts Group.

==== Downfall of Tote Tasmania ====
In 2012, Ranogajec was named as being the leader of a gambling syndicate which had profited from a rebate arrangement with Tote Tasmania Pty Ltd which was a Tasmanian state-owned company. The profits paid to Ranogajec and his partners virtually wiped out the profits of the Tote Tasmania Pty Ltd, to the extent that Treasurer of Tasmania was reduced to selling off the entire business to Tabcorp Holdings.

=== The "Punters Club" Syndicate ===
==== Tax audit controversy ====
The Australian Taxation Office (ATO) has looked at his activities on numerous occasions over the last 25 years and on each occasion has concluded his activities did not constitute a business. Due to the level of his success, the ATO had decided to probe again in 2008. The ATO's current position is that betting and gambling wins are not assessable unless you are carrying on a business of betting or gambling and is contained in published rulings for gambling syndicates in Australia. His business partner David Walsh believes that he does not owe them money as gambling on horse racing has never been a taxable source of income in Australia. Tax experts following this case have said if the ATO has now changed its position on horse racing gambling, taxing retrospective wins is unjust and imminent for a high court challenge and could potentially open up a can of worms for every Australian who has won on horse racing in the past.

After months of debt claims by the ATO, a settlement was agreed with Zeljko and other members of the punter's club, late October 2012. After a court-ordered mediation session between parties. The ATO deal remains confidential but it understood to relate to the years 2004–2011 only.

== Gaming career since leaving Australia ==
Since leaving Australia, it was reported in 2019 that Ranogajec is based in Europe, mostly UK and the Isle of Man. He was appointed as a consultant to Newfield Limited, an international racing and sports event company.

In the United Kingdom, Ranogajec is a co-founder of Colossus Bets along with Bernard Marantelli. Colossus Bets had announced a new venture partnership with the consortium Britbet comprising 55 British racecourses to operate horse betting racing pools and become a "major competitor in Tote service". On 12 June 2018 it was announced that the Britbet project with Colossusbets as a partner, had been terminated. In October 2020 Bernard Marantelli resigned as Chief Executive Officer of Colossusbets. He was also replaced as a director of the company by Eva Karagianni-Goel.

== Personal life ==
Ranogajec rarely gives interviews. According to some reports, there could be some intentional confusion as to his real name, whereby he'd be using his wife's surname, registering as John Wilson for investment or gambling endeavours.

=== Net worth ===
Ranogajec first appeared in The Australian Financial Review Rich List in 2019 with an assessed net worth at A$600 million; and on the 2020 Rich List, also at A$600 million. His net worth increased to A$610 million on the 2021 Rich List. Ranogajec has denied suggestions that he is the world's biggest punter, replying that "I believe that's absolutely untrue" and the magnitude of his betting and wealth is "all just a big exaggeration".

Year	Financial Review Rich List		Forbes Australia's 50 Richest	
Year	Rank	Net worth (A$)	Rank	Net worth (US$)
2019	164 ▲	$600 million ▲		
2020	179 ▼	$600 million		
2021	188 ▼	$610 million ▲		

Legend
Icon	Description
Steady	Has not changed from the previous year
▲	Has increased from the previous year
▼	Has decreased from the previous year

== See also ==
- Kerry Packer
- Haralabos Voulgaris
- Bill Benter
