= Murwillumbah High School =

Location
- Murwillumbah, Northern Rivers, New South Wales; Australia
- Coordinates: 28°20′4″S 153°23′25″E

Information
- Type: Government-funded co-educational comprehensive secondary day school
- Motto: Latin: Pergo, Periclitor, Perago (I strive, I undertake, I achieve)
- Established: 1929; 97 years ago
- Principal: Zoe Tiernan
- Teaching staff: 50.1 FTE (2018)
- Enrolment: 440 (2018)
- Colours: Navy blue and white
- Newspaper: Endeavour (fortnightly newsletter)
- Yearbook: The Parnassian
- Website: murwillumb-h.schools.nsw.gov.au

Murwillumbah High School, (abbreviated as MHS) is a government-funded co-educational comprehensive secondary day school, located on Riverview Street in Murwillumbah, in the Northern Rivers region of New South Wales, Australia.

Established in 1929, the school enrolled approximately 440 students in 2018, from Year 7 to Year 12, of whom nine percent identified as Indigenous Australians and six percent were from a language background other than English. The school is operated by the NSW Department of Education; the principal is Zoe Tiernan.

== History and campus ==
=== 1924 ===
After much deliberation and discussion, the department has resumed an area of about eight acres on Hartigan's Hill as the site for the new high school.

=== 1928 ===
The foundation stone of the new High School buildings was laid on 17 March in the presence of a large gathering of parents and students. An untimely thunderstorm just failed to mar the proceedings, for when the Minister of Education inspected the Guard of Honour, comprising Girl Guides and Boy Scouts, the sun had just broken through.

Murwillumbah High School was made a "full" high school in 1929 and moved into its current site in that year with the opening of a three-storey complex which has become a well-known landmark in Murwillumbah.

Since 1929 many buildings have been added with major development beginning in the 1960s. In 1992 a new Library was opened and in mid-1997 the Multi-Purpose Centre/Hall was opened and dedicated as "The Elliott Centre", after a previous principal of the school, Joe Elliott.

The school is built on the side of a hill, creating several floor levels across the school. Construction began in 1969 and continued over the following 3 years, culminating in a school that would meet the needs of the years to come. During this time the school's librarian and careers advisor Bruce Chick initiated the planting of a large hoop pine forest on the southern edge of the school. It was planted in 1970 as a Cook Bicentennial project. Students from the school were given the opportunity to plant a tree as a part of the commemoration. The original intention was to sell the timber from the plantation when the trees had reached maturity. The leadership of the school during these years fell to Joe Elliot and Bill Dowdell. The latter, in particular, is remembered with great affection by former students.

Captain James Cook had sighted, mapped and named Mount Warning in the Murwillumbah area as he sailed up the coast in 1770 and the fortnightly school newsletter 'Endeavour', is named in honour of his ship.

Development became the focus of attention during the early 1990s, when the school population peaked at 1,300 before the opening of Wollumbin High School, which then relaxed school capacity numbers.

=== Symbols ===
The official school colours are navy blue and white. However, over the years other colours were adopted (e.g. grey).

The competitions in designs for a school badge, motto and cover page of the magazine, evoked great enthusiasm amongst the pupils of the school. The large numbers of entries in each section was very gratifying, and great credit is reflected on the entrants, not only for the keen interest shown, but also for the high standard of their contributions. The work of judging was by no means an easy one, but we feel sure the decisions meet with the approval and approbation of every boy and girl. Helen Brown secures the prize for the badge and cover page, and Jack Trevitt for the motto. We are especially indebted to these two and offer them our heartiest congratulations.

— Extract from The Parnassian, 1928. p.6

The first school magazine (yearbook) was published in December 1923 when the Murwillumbah Secondary School was a district school i.e. one that incorporated primary and infants departments.

The school magazine was quickly named The Parnassian and has been published every year since it first appeared, copies of which are held in the school library.

== Notable alumni ==
- Doug Anthony – former Deputy Prime Minister
- Rory Arnold – Australian rugby union player for the Brumbies
- Jack Boyd – former politician; represented Byron (1973–1984)
- Bob Bugden – Australian rugby league footballer for the St. George Dragons
- Robert Hagan – international impressionist artist, author, and TV personality
- Stanley Stephens – politician; represented Byron (1944–1973) and Minister for Housing in the Askin Government
- Sir Eric Willis – Cabinet Minister from 1965 to 1976 and 34th Premier of New South Wales
- Max Willis – politician; served in the New South Wales Legislative Council (1970–1999) and as President of the Council (1991–1999)
- Edwin Wilson – poet and painter; fifth form only, as recorded in 'The Mullumbimby Kid'
- Alan Woods – international professional punter (pioneer of computer betting syndicates) – the Alan Woods rating system (AWRS) adopted by Bridge clubs throughout Australia.
- Ida Lessing Faith Bandler nee Mussing - Civil Rights and Social Justice activist. Played a leading role in the 1967 referendum that recognised Aboriginal and Torres Strait Islander peoples as part of the Australian population.

== See also ==
- List of government schools in New South Wales: G–P
- List of schools in the Northern Rivers and Mid North Coast
- Education in Australia
