= Murwillumbah =

Town in New South Wales, Australia

- Town
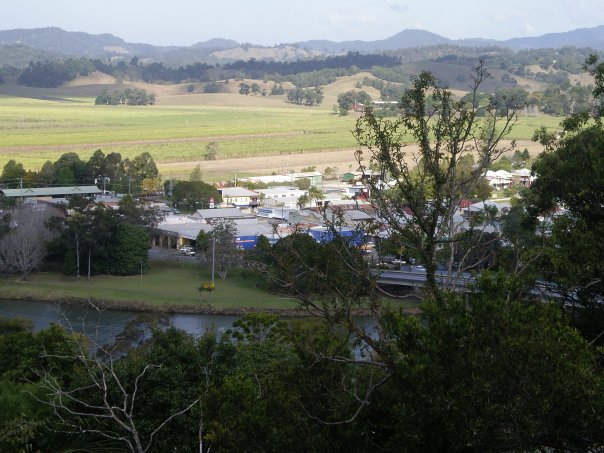
- Partial view of town and Tweed River, 2008

- Coordinates: 28°19′39″S 153°23′45″E
- Country: Australia
- State: New South Wales
- LGA: Tweed Shire
- Location: 822 km (511 mi) NE of Sydney; 133 km (83 mi) SSE of Brisbane; 31 km (19 mi) SW of Tweed Heads; 52 km (32 mi) NNW of Byron Bay; 67 km (42 mi) E of Kyogle

Government
  - State electorate: Lismore
  - Federal division: Richmond
- Elevation: 8 m (26 ft)

Population
  - Total: 9,812 (2021 census)
- Postcode: 2484
- County: Rous
- Mean max temp: 25.8 °C (78.4 °F)
- Mean min temp: 14.4 °C (57.9 °F)
- Annual rainfall: 1,570.1 mm (61.81 in)
Localities around Murwillumbah
Nobbys Creek	Kynnumboon	Tygalgah
North Arm	Murwillumbah	South Murwillumbah
Eungella	Byangum; Bray Park	Dunbible

Murwillumbah (/mərˈwɪləmbɑː/ mər-WIL-əm-bah) is a town in the Northern Rivers region of New South Wales, Australia, in the Tweed Shire, on the Tweed River. It sits on the south eastern foothills of the McPherson Range in the Tweed Volcano valley and is nearby the Mount Warning (Wollumbin). Murwillumbah is 848 kilometres (527 mi) north-east of Sydney, 13 kilometres (8.1 mi) south of the Queensland border and 132 kilometres (82 mi) south of Brisbane.

The town's name is often abbreviated to M'bah or Murbah.

At the 2021 census, Murwillumbah had a population of 9,812. Many of the buildings are art deco in style and there are cafes, clothes shops and antique shops in the town.

The Ngandowal and Minyungbal speaking people of the Bundjalung people are the traditional owners of Murwillumbah and its surrounding areas. The following clans Goodjinburra, Tul-gi-gin and Moorung-Moobah are recognised as being of particular significance.

== Origin of place name ==
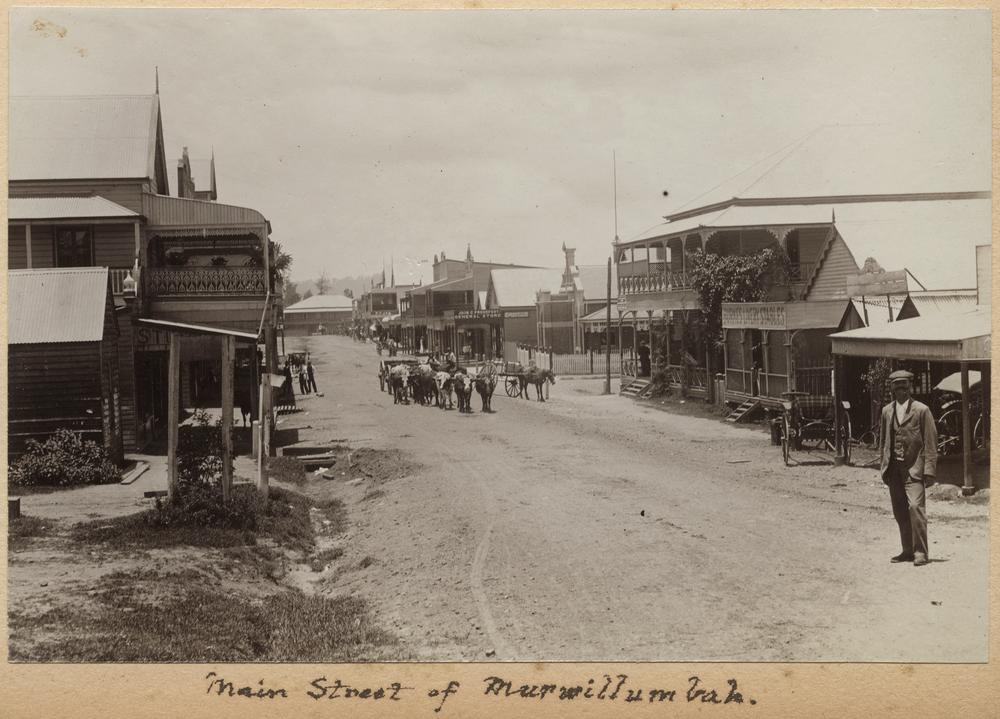
Main street, c. 1905

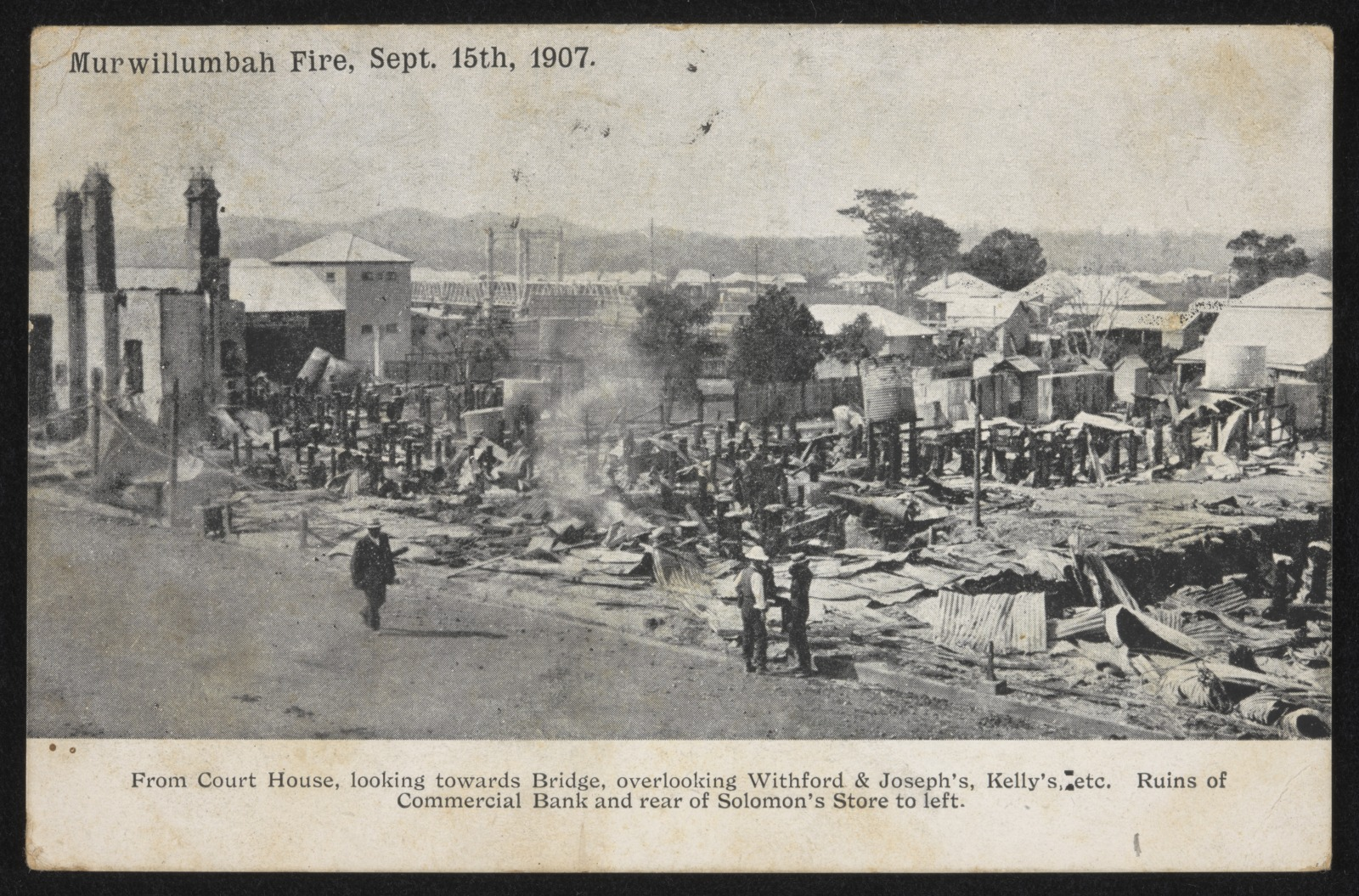
Postcard of the Murwillumbah fire, 15 September 1907

There are a number of theories as to the origin of the name Murwillumbah and it is thought to have either from a Bundjalung language compound word/s or from the name of a local tribe.

The compounds words are believed to either combine the words murrie (Aboriginal people), wolli (camp) and bah (place). Or be a combination of the words murra (big/many) and willum (possum) and bah (place).

The alternate theory is that the name was given to the place by Joshua Bray, a local magistrate and prominent community leader, and that it was taken from the name of a local tribe living there and that it was a name for their tribal land. The name for this tribe has also been recorded as Moorwooloobah.

== History ==
Timber-getters were drawn to the region in the 1840s. The river port at Tumbulgum was initially the main settlement; the land that now makes up Murwillumbah was first surveyed in 1872, and it was declared a village in the Government Gazette on 31 March 1879.

In 1894 the growth of the town was encouraged by the completion of the Murwillumbah railway line, which linked it with Lismore and terminated at the Murwillumbah railway station. One of the primary purposes of the Murwillumbah station was to link the sugar mill at Condong with broader markets. Due to this, in 1902, a local government municipality was declared with Murwillumbah as its centre.

Most of the town's business district was destroyed by fire on 15 September 1907 in events that became known as "Red Sunday". The fire started at a bakehouse owned by Edward Dainer; the alarm was quickly raised by Dainer's son, and soon 60 business buildings burned down causing £100,000 in damages. Of the destruction a local newspaper wrote:

The long expected has happened. What 48 hours ago was one of the most thriving cityettes in the Commonwealth is now a heap of blackened ruins. After years of unparalleled prosperity Murwillumbah has, after being asleep for too long, been rudely awakened. Our 'Fool's paradise' has been shattered, and our baptism of fire, long prophesised by all who had the welfare of the town at heart, is now more than a dream.

— Murwillumbah Devasted, Tweed and Brunswick Advocate (17 September 1907)

Many of the businesses destroyed, including the Imperial Hotel, were un- or under-insured but, despite this, the town rebuilt quickly and, within a year, had rebuilt "bigger and grander" and in brick.

In 1918 an initial 18 allotments were advertised for sale in the Hartigan Estate and a subsequent 200 allotments were advertised for sale in September 1920. The land was bounded by the Tweed River and Commercial Road on the east, Condong Street on the north, Riverview Street on the west and Elizabeth Street to the south. The subdivision was sold as part of the estate of Denis Hartigan. In December 1923, Bray Estate – made up of nine farm and farmlet blocks – was advertised to be auctioned by A. E. Budd & Son.

Murwillumbah was the location of Australia's largest bank robbery, known as the Murwillumbah bank robbery, when A$1.7 million in cash was stolen from the vault of the Bank of New South Wales by the "magnetic drill gang" in 1978. The case remains unsolved.

In November 2023, fire ants were discovered at Murwillumbah, the first time the species has been found outside of South East Queensland since the outbreak began in 2001.

=== Floods ===
Murwillumbah is protected by a series of levees, but they do not protect all parts of the town in major floods. The worst inundation, exceeding those of 1954, 1956, 1974, 2008 and 2009, started on 30 March 2017. The Tweed River reached 6.2 metres (20 ft) after rainfall of over 700 millimetres (28 in) from the remnants of Tropical Cyclone Debbie fell in its upper catchment over a 36-hour period. There was extensive and severe flooding, with mass evacuations from South Murwillumbah and other low-lying areas, and road access cut from both north and south. It fell just short of overtopping the 6.3 metres (21 ft) levees protecting the central business district.

The March 1974 flood caused two hundred people to be evacuated from the town after floodwater from Tropical Cyclone Zoe inundated the area. In January 2008, Murwillumbah and its surrounding areas were hit by severe flooding, while May 2009 saw more evacuations in the town and surrounds after very heavy rainfall. Major flooding also occurred in 2022. The 2022 floods were the worst seen on record. Even worse than 2017, much of Murwillumbah was inundated.

== Heritage listings ==
Murwillumbah has a number of heritage-listed sites, including:

- Casino-Murwillumbah railway, South Murwillumbah: Murwillumbah railway station. This station now serves as the start of Section 1 of the Northern Rivers Rail Trail.

== Transport ==
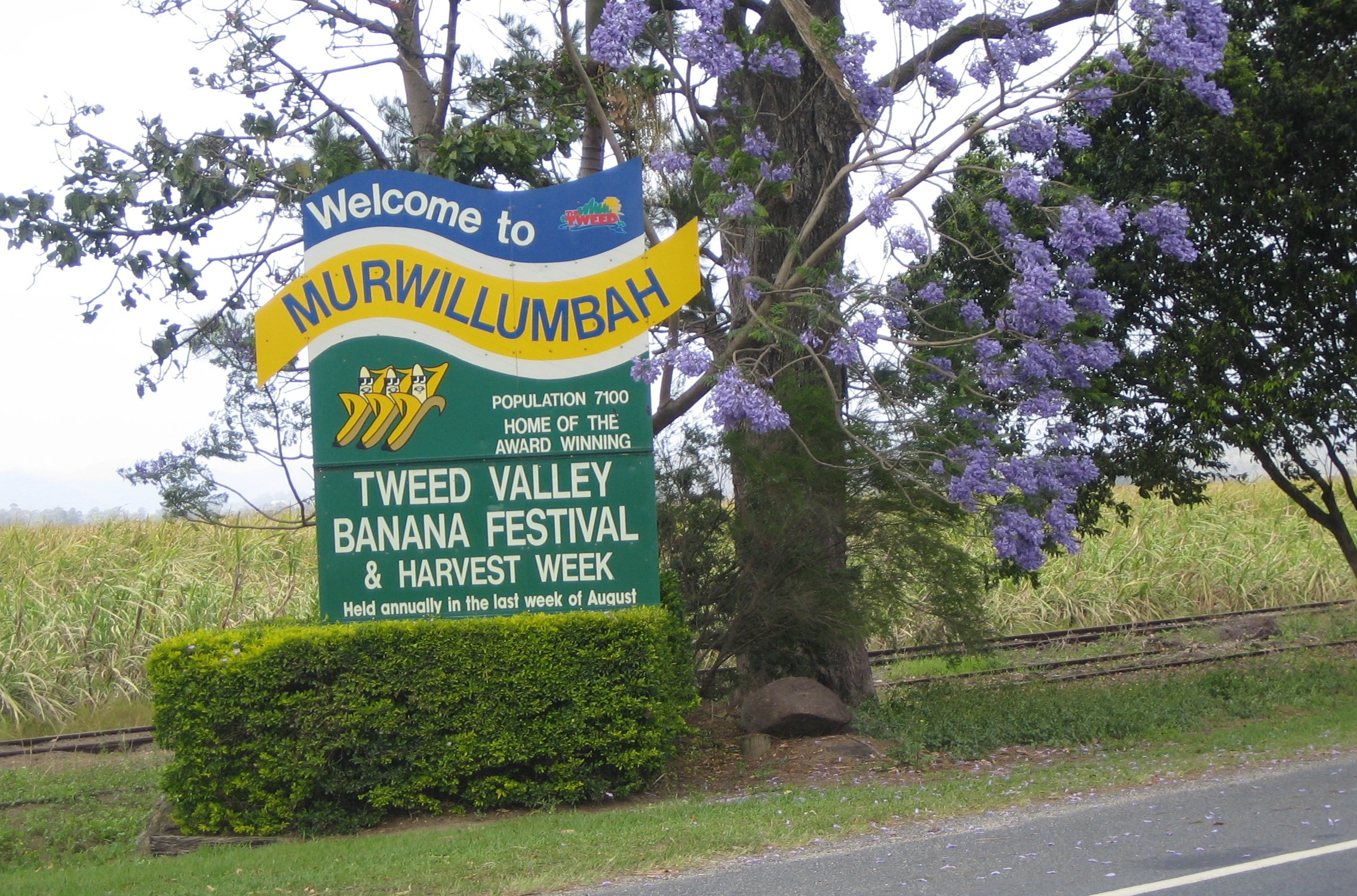
Murwillumbah sign, 2007

The Pacific Highway passed through South Murwillumbah, but the town was completely bypassed when the 27 kilometre dual carriageway Yelgun to Chinderah upgrade was opened in August 2002. The pre-existing highway, now significantly quieter, was renamed The Tweed Valley Way, and is the main means of access to Murwillumbah from both north and south.

A road leading north west, a scenic tourist drive, heads along the Numinbah Valley through the towns of Chillingham, Numinbah and Natural Bridge. A road south west of the town heads to Kyogle via the town of Uki, passing near to Nimbin en route.

Murwillumbah railway station was the terminus of the Casino–Murwillumbah branch line, and had daily services to Sydney until the line closed in 2004. Today NSW TrainLink coaches to and from Casino provide connections to Sydney, while the station itself is used as a tourist information centre.

Several bus services serve the area. Murwillumbah Bus Company offers regular services to major parts of the town, as well as Condong and Uki. Parson's Bus Service links passengers with Pottsville, Cabarita Beach, and Stokers Siding. Gosel's Bus Service offers services to Nimbin via Uki. Singh's Bus Service links the town to Chillingham, Tyalgum and Eungella. Kinetic Gold Coast operate hourly service to Tweed Heads via Terranora.

Murwillumbah's airfield, Whittle Field (ICAO code YMUR), is named after a noted local World War II Spitfire pilot, the late Bob Whittle. There are no scheduled flights, but its 800-metre grass runway supports Murwillumbah Aero Club and business activities including crop-dusting, aircraft restoration, training and scenic charter flights.

The nearest airports to the town are Gold Coast Airport, located 35 km (22 mi) north east, Ballina Byron Gateway Airport, located 75 km (47 mi) south east and Brisbane Airport, located 149 km (93 mi) north of Murwillumbah.

== Industry ==
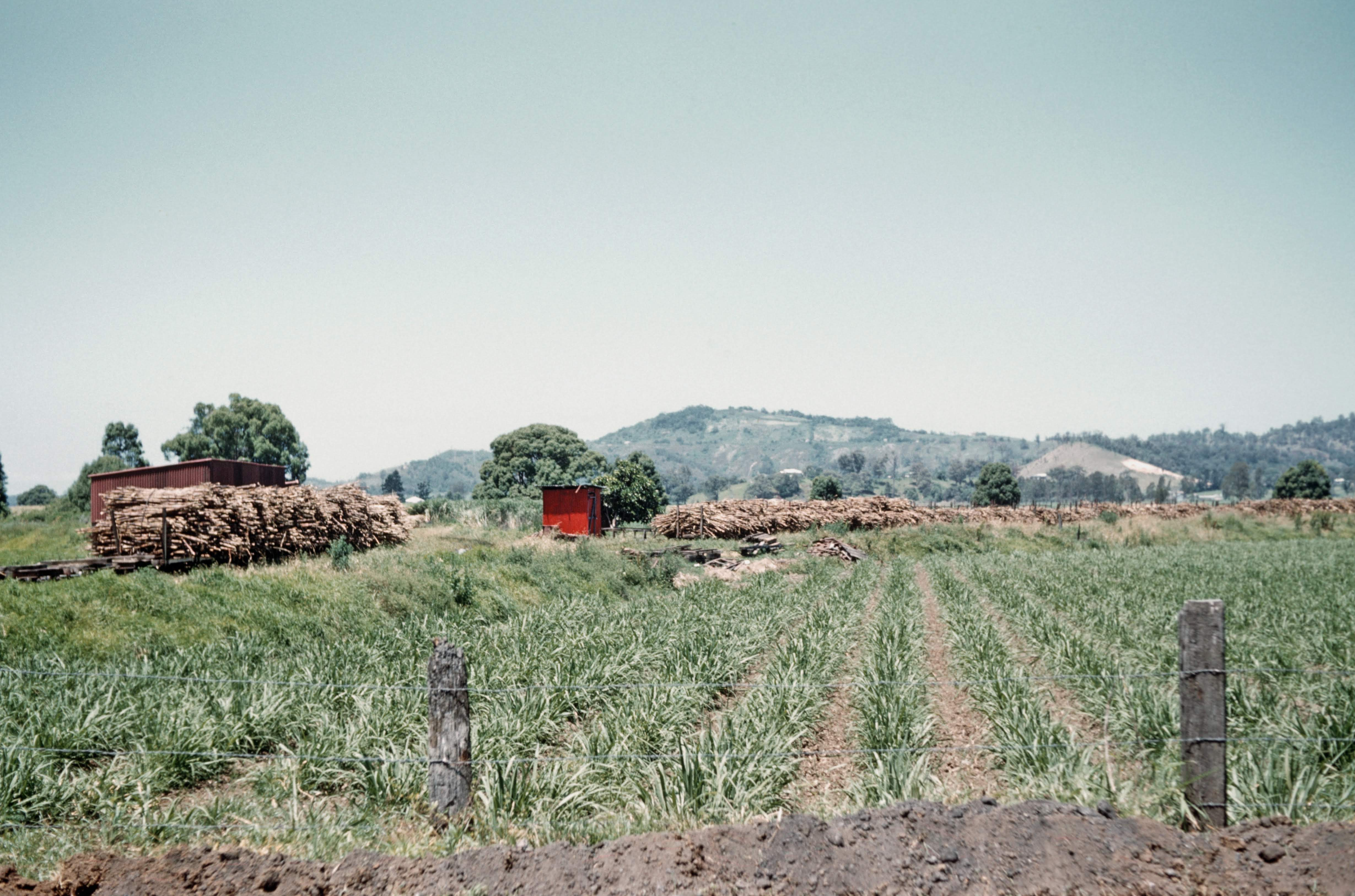
Sugar cane plantation near Murwillumbah in November 1961

Aside from tourism, the major industry of the area, is sugarcane growing. The sugar mill at nearby Condong was served by numerous tramways until 1973 saw the introduction of mechanical cane harvesting. There is also some dairy farming in the area. Coffee, bananas and assorted tropical fruit and vegetables are also produced throughout the area.

South Murwillumbah is home to Stone & Wood Brewing Co.'s second brewery, which opened in 2014. Other breweries based in the town include Spangled Drongo and Ventura Kombucha (which produces hard kombucha).

There are alternative lifestyle retreats nearby, including one of the Hare Krishna organisation.

== Festivals ==
The annual Tweed Banana Festival, the second oldest festival in Australia is staged in the town. In 2005, the festival celebrated its 50th anniversary.

From 2002 to 2009 an historic motor racing festival was run through the streets of Murwillimbah, featuring a parade through town, a one kilometre hillclimb course, and connected events, attracting thousands of spectators. Modeled on the Goodwood Festival of Speed, Speed on Tweed was a highlight of the local calendar attracting cars and competitors from all over Australia and from Europe and North America. In September 2009 the event was held in conjunction with Rally Australia which has scheduled one special stage in Murwillumbah.

== Demographics ==
Historical population
Year	Pop.	±%
1921	2,861	—
1933	3,895	+36.1%
1947	4,954	+27.2%
1954	6,748	+36.2%
1961	7,151	+6.0%
1966	7,311	+2.2%
1971	7,387	+1.0%
1976	7,294	−1.3%
1981	7,807	+7.0%
1986	7,678	−1.7%
1991	8,003	+4.2%
1996	7,657	−4.3%
2001	7,543	−1.5%
2006	7,952	+5.4%
2011	8,523	+7.2%
2016	9,245	+8.5%
2021	9,812	+6.1%
Source: Australian Bureau of Statistics data.

In the 2021 census, Murwillumbah recorded a population of 9,812 people, 52.5% female and 47.5% male. The median age of the Murwillumbah population was 46 years, 8 years above the national median of 38. 81.0% of people living in Murwillumbah were born in Australia. The other top responses for country of birth were England 3.4%, New Zealand 2.0%, India 1.1%, Germany 0.4%, and Philippines 0.4%. 87.7% of people spoke only English at home; the next most common languages were Punjabi 0.9%, Spanish 0.4%, French 0.3%, German 0.3% and Hindi 0.2%.

== Climate ==
Murwillumbah has a humid subtropical climate (Köppen: Cfa) with hot, wet summers and mild, relatively dry winters.

Climate data for Murwillumbah (Bray Park) (28º20'S, 153º23'E, 8 m AMSL) (1972–2024 normals and extremes)
Month	Jan	Feb	Mar	Apr	May	Jun	Jul	Aug	Sep	Oct	Nov	Dec	Year
Record high °C (°F)	42.9 (109.2)	40.9 (105.6)	36.5 (97.7)	35.4 (95.7)	31.9 (89.4)	27.8 (82.0)	29.5 (85.1)	35.9 (96.6)	37.4 (99.3)	38.2 (100.8)	39.6 (103.3)	40.8 (105.4)	42.9 (109.2)
Mean daily maximum °C (°F)	29.6 (85.3)	29.0 (84.2)	28.2 (82.8)	26.2 (79.2)	23.6 (74.5)	21.3 (70.3)	21.1 (70.0)	22.6 (72.7)	25.2 (77.4)	26.4 (79.5)	27.7 (81.9)	29.1 (84.4)	25.8 (78.5)
Mean daily minimum °C (°F)	19.8 (67.6)	19.7 (67.5)	18.5 (65.3)	15.6 (60.1)	12.5 (54.5)	9.9 (49.8)	8.6 (47.5)	8.8 (47.8)	11.5 (52.7)	14.2 (57.6)	16.7 (62.1)	18.6 (65.5)	14.5 (58.2)
Record low °C (°F)	13.2 (55.8)	13.8 (56.8)	11.5 (52.7)	6.6 (43.9)	2.2 (36.0)	−0.3 (31.5)	0.2 (32.4)	−1.4 (29.5)	3.2 (37.8)	4.1 (39.4)	6.6 (43.9)	10.6 (51.1)	−1.4 (29.5)
Average rainfall mm (inches)	212.8 (8.38)	229.5 (9.04)	211.7 (8.33)	149.3 (5.88)	126.9 (5.00)	101.5 (4.00)	64.0 (2.52)	51.1 (2.01)	39.2 (1.54)	108.2 (4.26)	118.2 (4.65)	172.5 (6.79)	1,581.1 (62.25)
Average rainy days (≥ 1.0 mm)	12.1	13.0	13.6	10.4	9.5	7.1	5.9	5.1	5.3	8.1	9.4	10.7	110.2
Average afternoon relative humidity (%)	62	65	64	63	61	59	53	50	51	56	59	60	59
Average dew point °C (°F)	20.2 (68.4)	20.2 (68.4)	18.7 (65.7)	16.4 (61.5)	13.6 (56.5)	11.1 (52.0)	9.4 (48.9)	9.7 (49.5)	12.0 (53.6)	14.5 (58.1)	16.8 (62.2)	18.6 (65.5)	15.1 (59.2)
Source: Bureau of Meteorology (1972–2024 normals and extremes)

== Education ==
Primary schools

- Hare Krishna School
- Mt St Patrick Primary School
- Murwillumbah East Primary School
- Sathya Sai School
- South Murwillumbah's Infants School
- St Joseph's Primary School
- Murwillumbah Primary School
- Tweed Valley Adventist College

Secondary schools

- Hare Krishna School
- Mount Saint Patrick College
- Murwillumbah High School
- Sathya Sai School
- Wollumbin High School
- Tweed Valley Adventist College

== Media ==
Radio stations that cover the town are ABC North Coast, River FM, Triple Z FM, and Radio 97, a community based station which broadcast from the town.

Murwillumbah receives TV channels from SBS and ABC and the regional stations of Seven, Nine and 10 Northern NSW.

Local newspaper is served by The Tweed Valley Weekly

== Sport and recreation ==
Murwillumbah has numerous sports clubs including Murwillumbah Colts, and Murwillumbah Mustangs, Murwillumbah SC, The Gentlemen of Murwillumbah Rugby Club.

Other sports facilities in the area include Murwillumbah Vulcans Australian Football Club, Murwillumbah Brothers Fishing Club, Murwillumbah Swimming Club, Murwillumbah Cycle Club, Murwillumbah Combat Club, Murwillumbah Cricket Club, Murwillumbah Rowing Club, Murwillumbah Hockey Club, Murwillumbah Netball Association, Murwillumbah Bowling Club, Murwillumbah Pistol Club, Murwillumbah Rifle Club, Murwillumbah Croquet Club, Tweed River Jockey Club, Tweed Valley Equestrian Group, Tweed River water Ski Club, Tweed Valley Triathletes-Triathlon Club, Murwillumbah Golf Club and Murwillumbah Tennis Club.

Tweed Shire Regional Botanic Gardens is also in Murwillumbah.

== In popular culture ==
Murwillumbah features in the short documentary Murbah Swamp Beer which was entered into Tropfest in 2002; it follows the events of the Murwillumbah Swamp Beer incident in which 40,000 bottles of beer feel into the Tweed River just outside of town.

Murwillumbah was used as the location for the film Lou (2010) starring John Hurt. The ABC television series of the novel Pastures of the Blue Crane was also filmed in the Tweed region in 1969. In 2018, the town was used as a film location for the Netflix-distributed Lunatics (2019) starring Chris Lilley. The town is close to the filming location of I'm a Celebrity...Get Me Out Of Here!, a British reality television show, and is used as a base for staff and crew working on the show.

== Notable people ==
Notable people from Murwillumbah include:

- Doug Anthony (1929–2020), Australian politician
- Reginald Arnold (1924–2017), Australian cyclist
- Paul Bird (born 1954), Paralympian swimmer
- Richie Arnold (born 1990), Australian international rugby union player
- Rory Arnold (born 1990), Australian international rugby union player
- Bob Batty (1939–2004), Australian rugby league player
- Robert William 'Bob' Bellear (1944–2005), first Aboriginal Australian judge
- Joshua Bray (1838–1918), "founder" of Murwillumbah
- Mark Brokenshire (born 1961), Australian rugby league player
- Max Bryant (born 1999), Brisbane Heat and Queensland cricketer
- Glenn Butcher (born 1961), Australian actor
- Peter Cooley (artist) (born 1957), Australian ceramicist and painter
- Larry Corowa (born 1957), Australian international rugby league player
- Luke Covell (born 1981), former New Zealand international and Cronulla rugby league player
- John Dowling (born 1953), former rugby league player for the St. George Dragons and Queensland
- Nathan Eglington (born 1980), Australian field hockey midfielder and striker
- Stephanie Gilmore (born 1988), Australian surfer with eight world titles
- Jack Gosiewski (born 1994), Australian rugby league player
- Robert Hagan (born 1947), Australian artist
- John Hargreaves (1945–1996), Australian actor
- Chris Higgins (1943–1990), senior Australian public servant
- Johno Johnson (1930–2017), Australian politician
- Narayana Johnson (died 2025), Australian musician also known as River Boy
- Russ Kelly (1909–1943), Australian rugby union player
- Anthony Laffranchi (born 1980), Australian National Rugby League player
- Jenny McAllister (born 1973), Australian politician
- Jack McVeigh (born 1996), Australian basketballer
- Tallulah Morton (born 1991), Australian model
- Barry Muir (1937–2022), Australian rugby league player and coach
- Walter Mussing (1916–1990), Australian rugby league player
- Damien Quinn (born 1981), former rugby league player for Crusaders Rugby League
- Reece Robson (born 1998), Australian rugby league player
- Barry Singh (born 1965), Australian musician
- Ann Symonds (1939–2018), Australian politician
- Ron Tullipan (1917–1975) Australian author
- Eric Willis (1922–1999), Australian politician, 34th premier of New South Wales
- Max Willis (1935–2021), Australian politician
- Alan Woods (1945–2008), gambler, mathematician and actuary
- Dylan Wotherspoon (born 1993), Australian international field hockey player

== Gallery ==
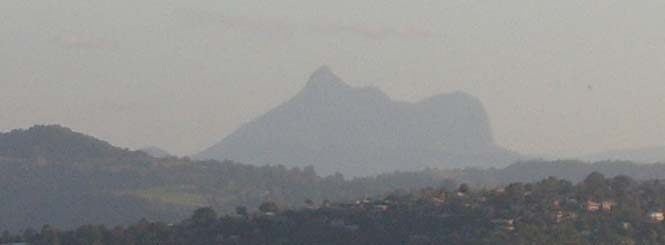
View of Mount Warning, 2005

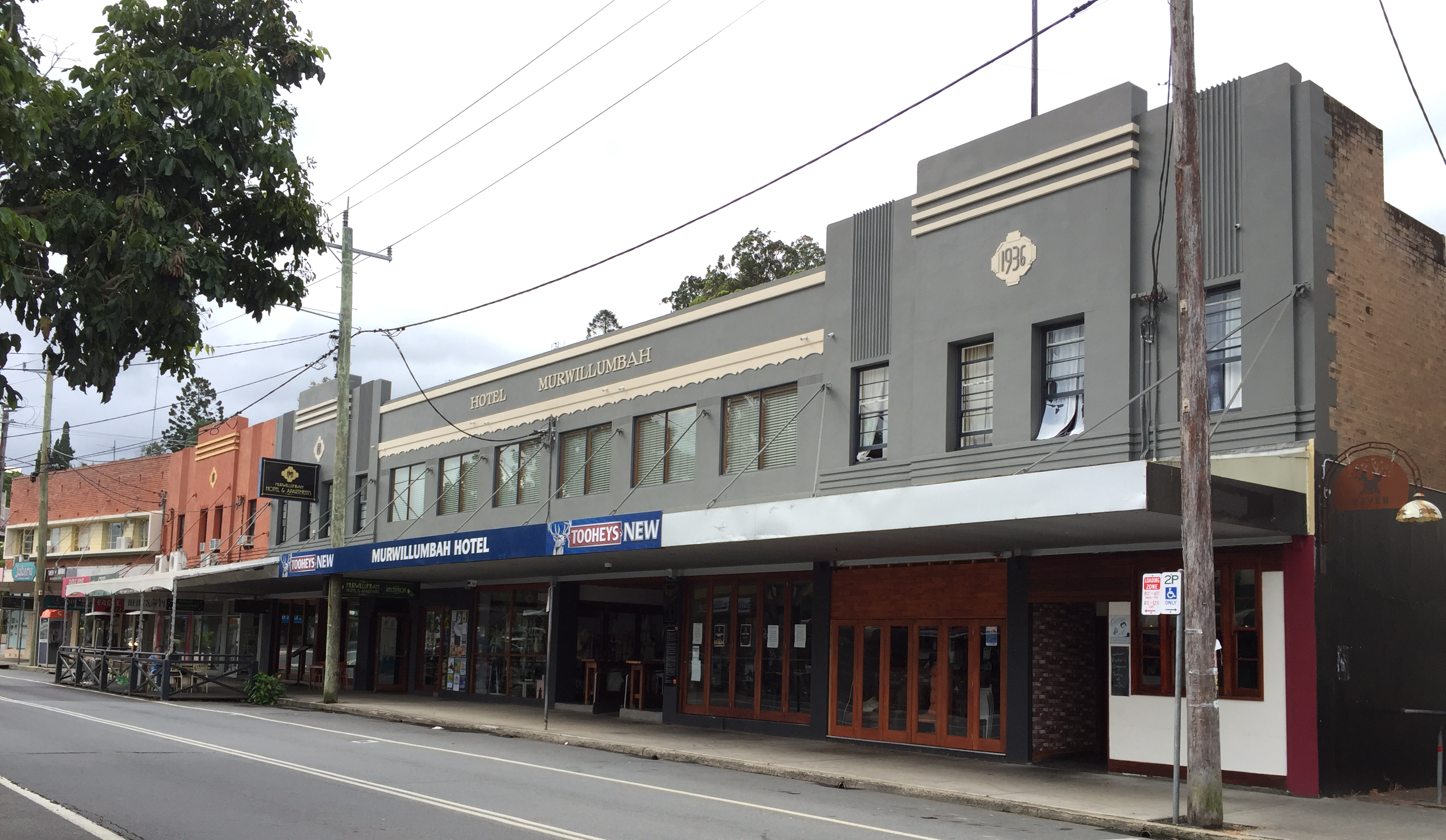
Main Street, 2016

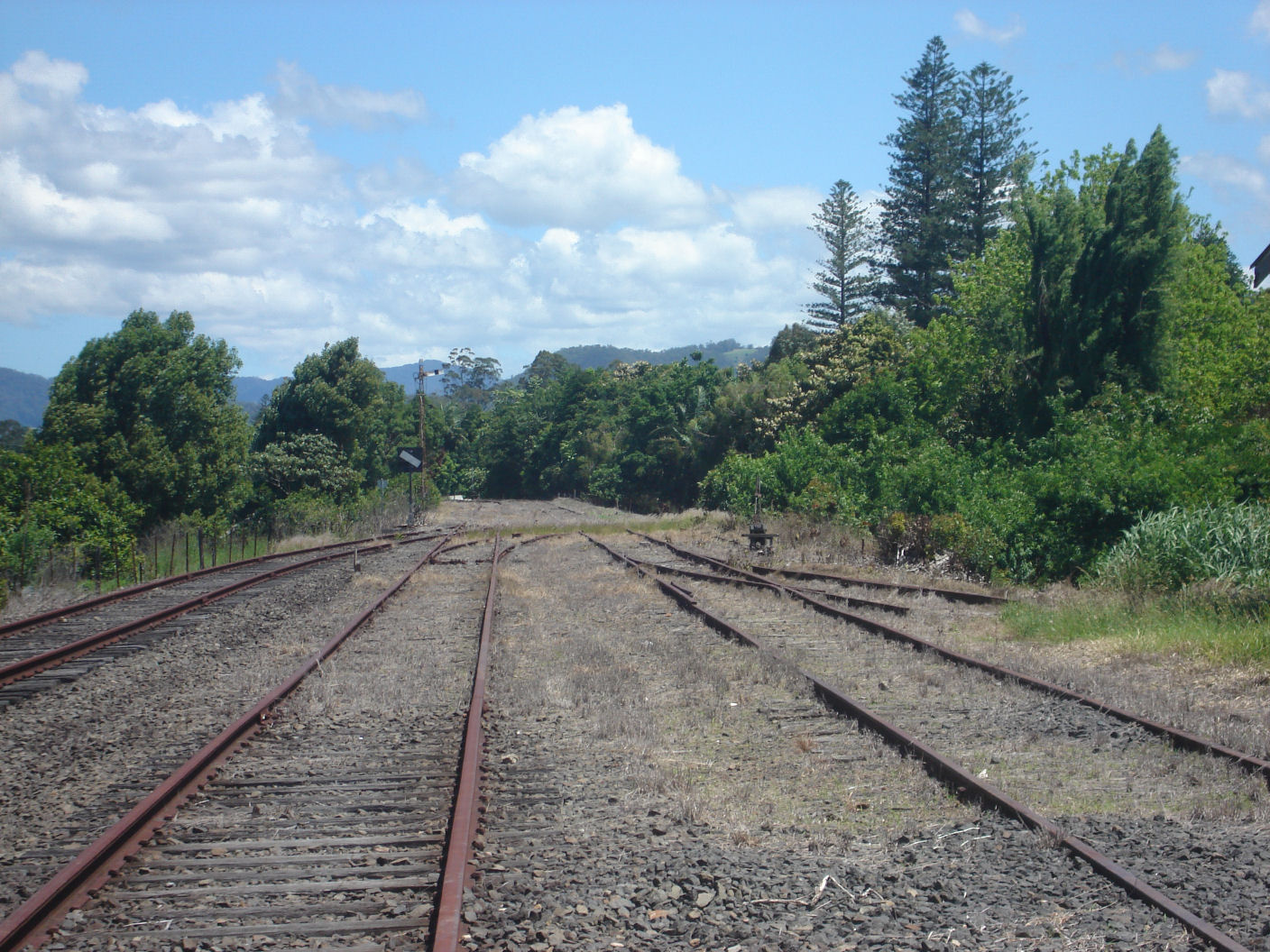
Abandoned train lines, 2007

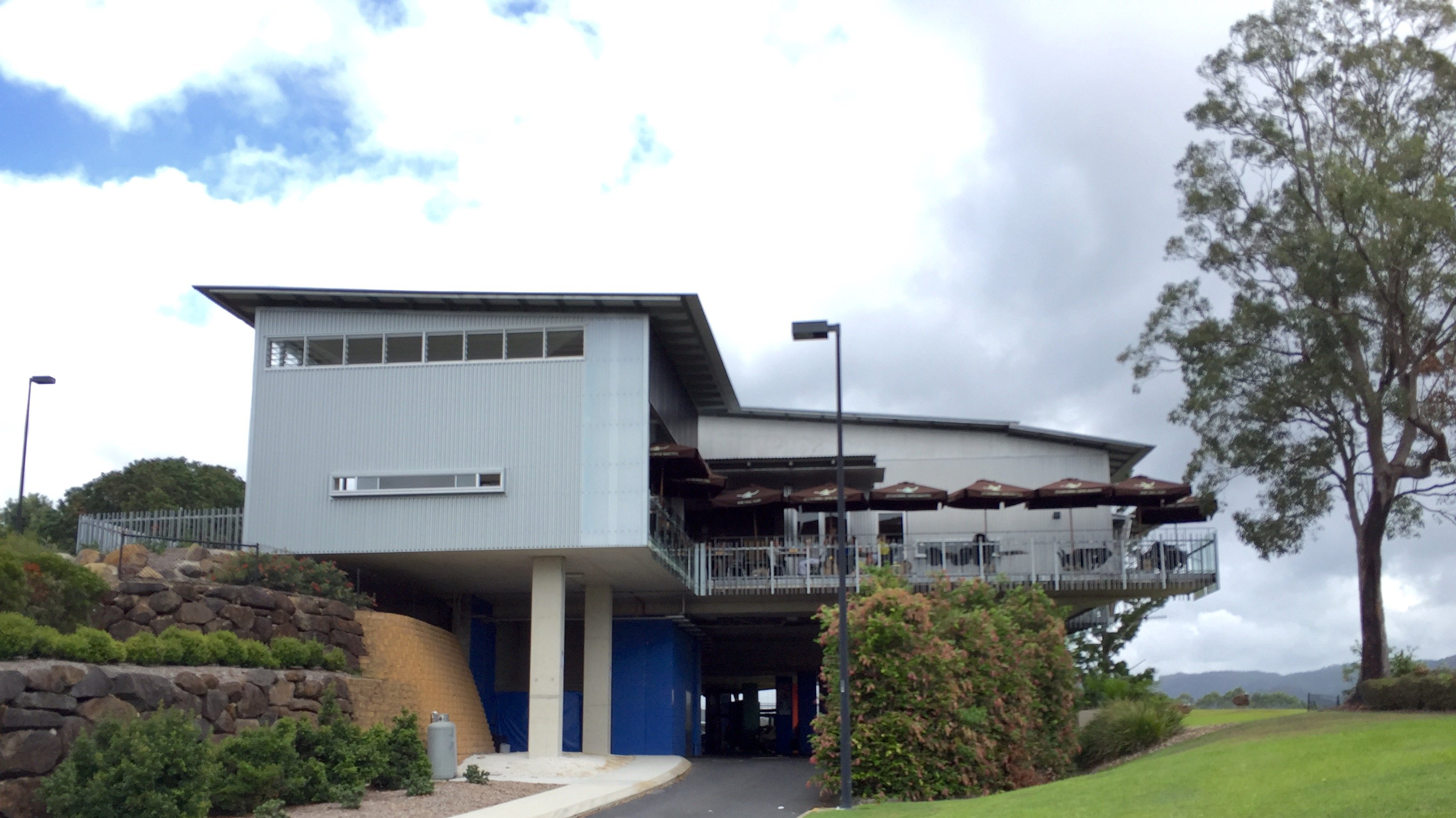
Nearby Tweed Regional Gallery, 2016

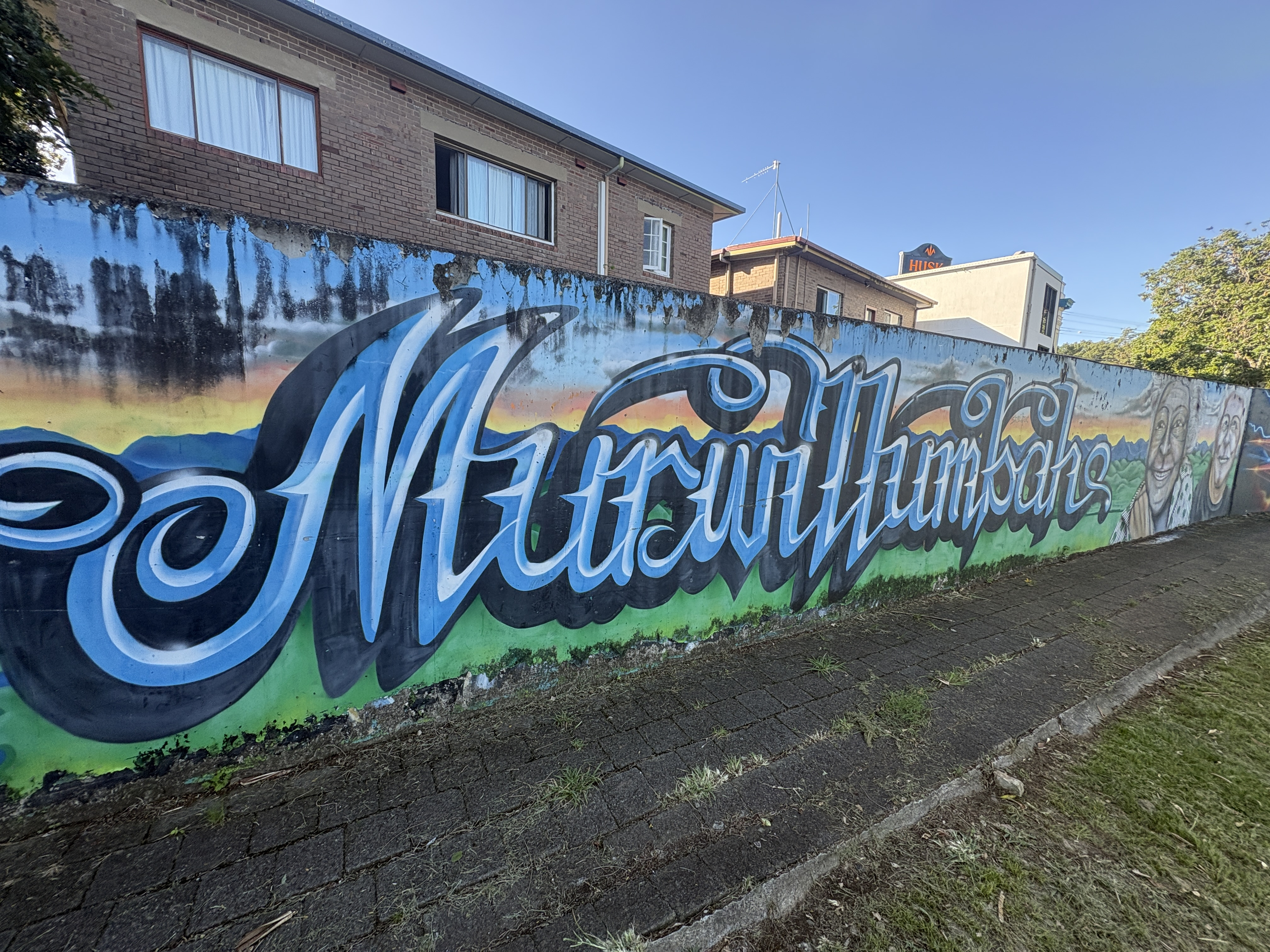
Murwillumbah flood levee wall, 2026
