= John Dowling (rugby league) =

Australian rugby league footballer

Personal information
- Full name: John Michael Dowling
- Born: 3 April 1953 (age 73) Murwillumbah, New South Wales, Australia

Playing information
- Position: Hooker
Club
Years	Team	Pld	T	G	FG	P
1972	Eastern Suburbs
1974	Wynnum-Manly
1979–84	St. George Dragons	117	13	15	0	70
1985	Northern Suburbs	8
	Total	125	13	15	0	70
Representative
Years	Team	Pld	T	G	FG	P
1982	Queensland	3	0	0	0	0

John Dowling (born 3 April 1953) is an Australian former rugby league footballer who played in the 1970s and 1980s.

== Biography ==
Murwillumbah hooker came to Brisbane Easts in 1972 before joining Wynnum-Manly in 1974. A Queensland rep against France in 1977, John Dowling ventured to the St. George Dragons in 1979 under the coaching of Harry Bath but missed the club's grand final success that year because of injury. Dowling played six seasons at St. George Dragons between 1979 and 1984.

He went on to play in three Rugby League State of Origin matches for Queensland in 1982 before returning to Brisbane at the end of the 1984 season. Dowling was Reserve grade coach under Craig Young at St. George in 1989–1990.
