= Tallulah Morton =

Australian fashion model and artist

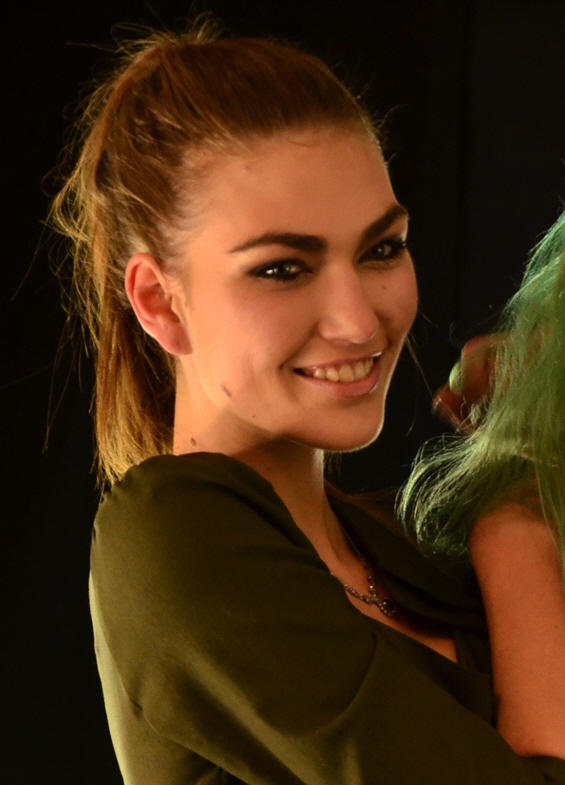
- Tallulah Morton
- Born: Tallulah Morton; 27 November 1991 (age 34); North Sydney, Australia
- Modeling information
- Height: 1.80 m (5 ft 11 in)
- Hair color: Brown
- Eye color: Blue

Tallulah Morton (born 27 November 1991) is an Australian fashion model / artist, living in North Sydney.

== Early life and education ==
Morton was discovered by Gold Coast talent agent Kathy Tabet at age 13 while shopping with her mother at Pacific Fair. Tabet, a former international model herself, "approached the young girl's mother and said Talullah had the ability to be a top model". Several months later, while studying at Wollumbin High School in Murwillumbah, Morton completed a modelling course at Tabet's now-defunct Buckingham Academy and was subsequently booked for Australian Fashion Week. She then had many other professional modelling appearances including opening the 2005 show for Australian fashion designer Josh Goot. A 20-page shoot in fashion magazine Follow was published shortly thereafter, quickly leading to other work. By 2006, Morton had made her New York City debut, at another Josh Goot show. Her age reportedly inhibited her ability to work in Europe initially, and was referenced again when bans on under-age modelling were mooted in 2007.

== Career ==
Morton has featured on the cover of many Australian magazines including Follow, Russh twice and The Daily Telegraph's 'Sunday' (16 July 2006). Her other magazine credits include Vogue, Marie Claire and Harper's Bazaar.

Morton has performed in shows such as Vivienne Westwood's Tokyo show, the World Merino Conference in Perth, New Zealand Fashion Week, and for David Jones. She also became the face of the Cue campaign, and Argentinian fashion brand Complot.

In 2007, Morton made her Paris debut with Marilyn's, showing Dior, Jean Paul Gaultier and Viktor & Rolf winter collections. Morton has worked with prominent fashion photographers Patrick Demarchelier, Steven Meisel and David Sims, and with fashion designers Diane von Furstenberg and Phillip Lim. Morton is currently represented by Chic Management in Sydney.
