= Terry Ramsden =

English investor and gambler

- Born: 1952 (age 73–74); Enfield, Greater London, England
- Occupations: Investor; Gambler
- Spouse: Lisa Ramsden
- Children: 1

Terry Ramsden (born 1952) is an English investor and gambler from Enfield who focused on horse betting and the Japanese stock market.

== Early life ==
Ramsden was raised in Enfield as the son of a GPO Telephones engineer. He began working as an insurance clerk and realized being employed by another would never lead to the wealth he was seeking. In 1971 at the age of 19 he was self-employed and earned £25,000 his first month.

== Career ==
Ramsden earned his initial money through lower stakes gambling on horse races. In 1984 he purchased Glen International, an Edinburgh-based company. He focused the company on horse betting. In the first year he had a small annual turnover of £18,000, three years later that figure grew to £3.5 billion. He became United Kingdom's 57th richest man. His alleged peak net worth was approximately £150 million.

One of his biggest wins was in 1984 when he paid £500,000 for a horse named Katies just a few days before she was expected to run in the Irish 1,000 Guineas. The purchase of Katies was recommended by the Newmarket trainer Mick Ryan who told Ramsden that the horse would win at the Curragh. Katies then actually won the race at odds of 20 to 1, which led to Ramsden winning around £2.5 million.

Between 1984 and 1987 his knowledge of horse racing and the Japanese market made him a fortune. By 1986 he was worth over £100 million. He owned several houses including one in Los Angeles, and over 100 horses. He started a record company called Influx records. He kept band manager Tam Kenny ( Balloch) who previously both worked with A Flock of Seagulls, and worked with Karen Rix (Hungry Waters). Karen Rix was dating Brian Robertson ‘Robbo’ (Thin Lizzy and Motorhead); they have one son together, Logan Robertson (born 4.3.91) That same year Ramsden placed a £500,000 wager on his own horse, Mr. Snugfit, in the Grand National. Mr. Snugfit came in 4th, resulting in a £1 million profit for Ramsden.

In 1988, following the 1987 stock market crash and later the Japanese asset price bubble bursting, Ramsden proceeded to lose vast sums of money including £57 to £58 million on racetrack gambling and suffered capital losses nearing £100 million. In 1991 he was arrested and jailed in Los Angeles for six months while awaiting extradition to the United Kingdom for fraud. In prison he witnessed gang violence. By 1992 he was £100 million in debt. He declared bankruptcy and pleaded guilty in 1993 to recklessly inducing fresh investments into Glen International. He received a two-year suspended sentence.

In 1997, Ramsden breached the Insolvency Act after it was discovered he was hiding £300,000 worth of assets. He was sentenced to 21 months in prison, which he served 10. He was released in 1999 with a lack of support from the friends he acquired during his rich days. His wife and son were estranged.

He started working in the private treaty market, creating a trading system which sped up equities transactions. This company grew to a market capitalisation of £250 million. In 2003, the Jockey Club cleared him to race and own horses again. He owned Jake The Snake, a two-year-old horse named after his son. Jake won the Bet Direct No Q Maiden Stakes at Lingfield in December of that year, Ramsden's first win after prison. He later sold the horse after it failed to perform to expectations.

In 2009, he failed to keep up with payments claiming it was a result of being been unable to sell a property in Barbados.

== Personal life ==
Ramsden has been known for sporting a mullet. He lived a glamorous lifestyle owning multiple cars, houses, racehorses and at one time 30% of Chelsea F.C. and all of Walsall F.C. He has a son, Jake, and ex-wife, Lisa.

== See also ==
- Alan Woods (gambler)
