= 1978 Murwillumbah bank robbery =

Robbery in Australia

The 1978 Murwillumbah bank robbery was a bank robbery that took place on 22 November 1978. It is believed that a group known as the Magnetic Drill Gang stole just over A$1.7 million (equivalent to A$9.87 million in 2022) in that robbery, from the Bank of New South Wales, now Westpac, in Murwillumbah, New South Wales. The robbery is considered to be the biggest bank robbery in Australian history, and the money was never recovered.

== Events ==
On the evening of 22 November 1978, thieves broke through the rear doors of the Bank of New South Wales and then, using a medical cystoscope and other specialised equipment, broke into the Chubb safe and took its entire contents. Their signature tool was an electromagnetic diamond-tipped drill. The process of breaking into the safe took several hours and, after taking its contents, the thieves jammed the safe shut.

Much of the money in the safe had only arrived that day, in an armoured Transurety Australia van, guarded by five security officers.

During the robbery, local people did not see or hear anything unusual.

== The Magnetic Drill Gang ==
The robbery is believed to have been committed by the Magnetic Drill Gang, who had already stolen approximately $1 million in at least nine robberies in Sydney and Melbourne using the same tools, namely the diamond-tipped drill, and a circular electro-magnet holding it in place. All of these robberies had been from Chubb safes and the gang is believed to have honed their skills with these on a safe door they had stolen in Melbourne in 1976.

== Aftermath ==
The robbery was not discovered until 7:30am the next day (23 November 1978) when a patrolling security officer noticed that the rear door was open. It then took bank staff, police, Chubb safe experts and finally local council workers nine hours, until 4:30pm, to open the safe and confirm that its contents had been stolen. The safe was finally opened by the council workers, led by the Tweed Shire engineer, who used jackhammers and sledgehammers to cut a hole in the external wall of the bank and its reinforced concrete.

The police officer, Chief Inspector Frank Charleton, was the first to enter the safe is said to have stated "they got the lot". This slogan became directly associated with this bank robbery and was replicated on t-shirts, beer glasses, tea towels and other goods sold around Australia and the world.

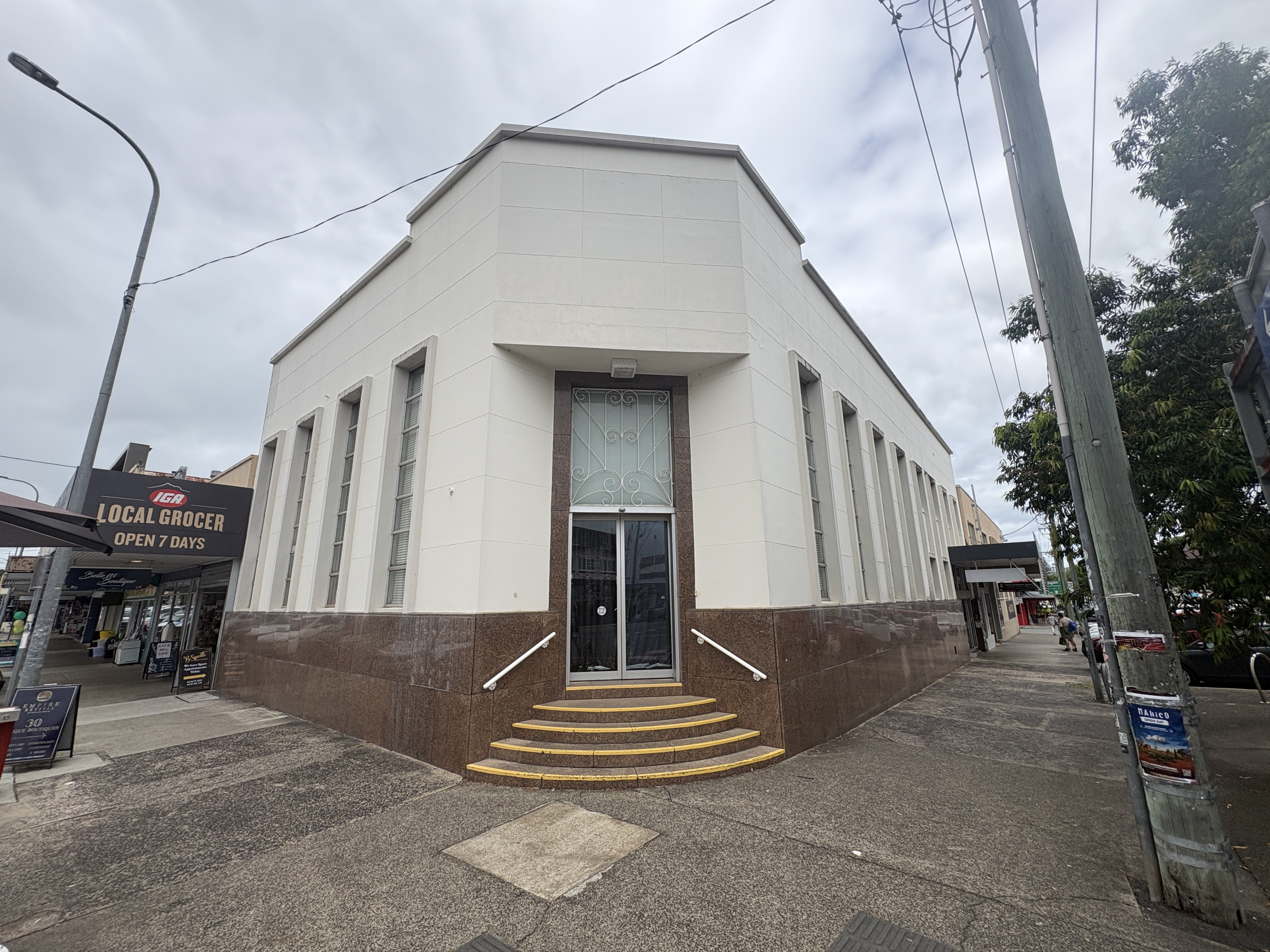
The former Bank of New South Wales and location of the Murwillumbah bank robbery, vacant as at March 2026

The money within the vault was primarily in untraceable notes as the bank branch served as a major point of receipt for old notes being sent on to the Reserve Bank of Australia. Much of the money stolen had been received by the bank the day before and had been collected from banks throughout the region.

Although two men were sought for questioning for the crime, and facial composites were prepared, they were never located and no one was charged for the crime. This was despite a $250,000 reward on offer. Many believe it was an "inside job" as otherwise the thieves would probably not have known about the amount of cash the bank was holding that night. Police, security officers and the armoured truck staff were all suggested as possible perpetrators.

Also in 1979, some of the money stolen from Murwillumbah was cashed in at a bank in Hong Kong which then became the centre of an investigation trying to establish how much of money had been laundered through there.

Since the robbery it has been alleged that Graham Kinniburgh, a safe cracker, was involved in the crime. However, in 2021 Robert Bertram “Bertie” Kidd, who has since died, claimed to have planned the robbery but to have been unable to attend on the night, as he was "unexpectedly detained in prison"; many do not believe this claim as all information shared by Kidd was well known.

== In popular culture ==
Murwillumbah soon gained notoriety for the crime and the t-shirts, and much of the merchandise created, was made by local man Peter Moore who owned the local menswear store. The t-shirts showed a 'ocker type' man, with a beer belly and hairy legs with the words "they got the lot" across the top and, to keep up with demand, Moore worked 18 hours a day screen-printing them. It is believed that Ronnie Biggs, who helped plan and execute the Great Train Robbery of 1963, ordered three shirts while on the run in Rio de Janeiro. A year later Moore released a follow up version "enjoying the lot" showing the same man relaxing under a palm tree.

In 1979, the Bullamakankas included the robbery as being part of the inspiration for the single "Murwillumbah Bank Job". Part of the lyrics of this song are:

And now the bank job in Murwillumbah it shouldn't be like that
They took two million dollars and they put it on the map
And they had the bank vault covered they knew just what to do
They came, they saw, they conquered and then they all shot through

— Bullamankanka, "Murwillumbah Bank Job", 1979

== See also ==
- List of bank robbers and robberies
- Timeline of major crimes in Australia
- Crime in Australia
- Murwillumbah Swamp Beer
