= Billy Walters (gambler) =

American professional gambler

- Born: July 15, 1946 (age 80); Munfordville, Kentucky
- Occupations: Entrepreneur, philanthropist

William T. Walters (born July 15, 1946) is an American entrepreneur, philanthropist, New York Times best-selling author, and one of the most successful American sports bettors of all time, having a winning streak which extended over 30 years. Walters was convicted of insider trading and received a 5-year prison sentence, later commuted.

In 1987, Walters stopped all gambling other than sports betting and returned to his roots in business. As of 2016, his holding company owned interests in eight car dealerships with one under construction, one golf course on the Las Vegas Strip, a rental-car franchise, and a number of commercial properties. His net worth is estimated at more than $200 million.

== Early life ==
Walters grew up poor in the rural town of Munfordville, Kentucky. His father, an auto mechanic, died when Walters was 18 months old. His mother, who was an alcoholic, walked out on her son and two daughters shortly after the death of Walters's father. He was raised by his grandmother in a home with no running water or indoor plumbing.

Walters credits his grandmother, a devout Baptist, with instilling a strong work ethic. She worked two jobs cleaning houses and washing dishes while raising seven children. At the age of seven, Walters secured a $40 bank loan for a power lawnmower to start a grass-cutting business. At age nine, he secured a second loan for $90 to start a paper route. His grandmother arranged both loans for Walters.

His grandmother died when Walters was 13, forcing him to move to Louisville, Kentucky, to be with his mother. There he worked two jobs, one in the morning at a bakery and the second at a gas station in the evenings. He rented a room in the basement from his mother, who charged him $10 per week. He married and had a child before graduating high school. The marriage was short-lived.

== Gambling career ==
Walters started gambling when he was 9 years old, when he bet the money he earned from his paper route on the New York Yankees to beat the Brooklyn Dodgers in the 1955 World Series. The Dodgers won and Walters lost the bet, but it did not deter him from gambling. Walters was a losing gambler as late as 1982. He had lost $50,000 by the time he was 22. Walters once lost his house during a game of pitching pennies. The winner did not take possession; Walters agreed to pay off the debt over the next 18 months.

Walters's success changed in his mid to late 30s. In June 1986, Walters requested a freeze-out with Caesars Atlantic City for $2 million at the roulette tables. Walters was known to have lost $1 million at least twice at the Las Vegas blackjack tables. Caesars, however, declined his request. Walters then took his proposition to the Atlantic Club Casino Hotel, then known as the Golden Nugget, which was accepted.

Walters and his gambling partner delivered $2 million to the cage at the Atlantic Club Casino Hotel. The pair noticed a wheel bias and bet on the 7–10–20–27–36. After 38 hours of play they won $3,800,000, beating the prior record of $1,280,000 held by Richard W. Jarecki at the San Remo Casino in Monte Carlo in 1971. Three years later his "Syndicate" had won $400,000 at a casino in Las Vegas and an additional $610,000 from Claridge Casino in Atlantic City. Walters also captured the 1986 Super Bowl of Poker, (also known as Amarillo Slim's Super Bowl of Poker or SBOP) in Lake Tahoe earning $175,000.

=== Sports betting ===
In the 1980s, Walters joined the Computer Group, which used computer analysis to analyze sports outcomes. Over a period of 39 years, Walters had only one losing year, with a 30-year winning streak. Though he has finished with a loss for a few months, he was always in profit by the end of the year. Walters bet on basketball, the NFL, and college football. Walters won $3.5 million on Super Bowl XLIV after betting on the New Orleans Saints. Due to his reputation, Walters often placed bets through "runners" so bookmakers would remain unaware of the person behind the bet. Walters has admitted that he "only" wins about 57% of his bets, contrary to many sports betting "touts" who sell their picks by claiming much higher win percentages, and that he has been able to amass a fortune by betting on a huge number of games where he has a relatively small edge.

In January 2007, Walters won a $2.2 million bet on University of Southern California defeating University of Michigan; USC won, 32–18. In 2011, Walters claimed he could make between $50 and $60 million on a good year.

In 2023, Walters, along with Billy Baxter, "Roxy" Roxborough, and "Lefty" Rosenthal, was inducted into the Sports Betting Hall of Fame at the Circa Hotel and Casino in Las Vegas. His plaque reads: "Billy Walters is known for being the greatest sports bettor of all time. He commands respect from every prominent bookmaker in the world and is known for contributing as a philanthropist to many causes."

== Book ==
In an interview with VSiN in February 2022, Walters announced he was co-authoring a memoir with journalist and best-selling author Armen Keteyian. ESPN reported that people close to professional golfer Phil Mickelson said he was concerned about the upcoming book and the reputational damage it may cause.

The book, called Gambler: Secrets from a Life at Risk. was published by Simon & Schuster and released in August 2023. It details Walters's life story and includes two chapters on his secrets and strategies to sports betting. Walters also goes into detail about his fractured friendship with Phil Mickelson and his belief that if the golfer had testified during the insider trading trial, Walters would not have been convicted.

The book became a New York Times best seller.

== Insider trading ==
In April 2017, Walters was found guilty of insider trading after using non-public information from Thomas C. Davis, a board member of Dean Foods. Walters was sentenced to 5 years in prison and fined $10 million. Lawyer Daniel Goldman, then an assistant United States Attorney for the Southern District of New York, was part of the trial team.

Walters's source, company director Thomas C. Davis, using a prepaid cell phone and sometimes the code words "Dallas Cowboys" for Dean Foods, helped Walters, between 2008 and 2014, realize profits and avoid losses in the stock, the Federal jury found. Walters gained $32 million in profits and avoided $11 million in losses. At the trial, investor Carl C. Icahn was mentioned in relation to Walters's trading but was not charged with wrongdoing. Golfer Phil Mickelson "was also mentioned during the trial as someone who had traded in Dean Foods shares and once owed nearly $2 million in gambling debts to" Walters. Mickelson "made roughly $1 million trading Dean Foods shares; he agreed to forfeit those profits in a related civil case brought by the Securities and Exchange Commission".

On December 4, 2018, the U.S. 2nd Circuit Court of Appeals upheld the insider trading conviction and 5-year sentence of Walters, even though it chastised the FBI Supervisory Special Agent responsible for overseeing the investigation for leaking grand jury information about the case. On October 7, 2019, the U.S. Supreme Court refused to hear Walters's appeal.

Walters was initially imprisoned at Federal Prison Camp, Pensacola, but was released to home confinement in Carlsbad, California, on May 1, 2020, amid the COVID-19 pandemic. His sentence was scheduled to be completed on January 10, 2022, and was commuted by Donald Trump on January 20, 2021.

== Personal life ==
Walters has three children, and is an avid golfer. He claims to have made over $400,000 on one hole and once as much as $1 million in one round, although he admitted to losing that same amount at blackjack later that night.

In June 2014, Walters had a private jet worth $20 million and owned seven homes, with a net worth estimated at over $100 million.

=== Philanthropy ===
Walters is a noted philanthropist and has donated to Opportunity Village, a Las Vegas nonprofit for people with intellectual disabilities. In September 2020, in response to Opportunity Village canceling their two largest fundraising events because of the COVID-19 pandemic, the Walters family committed to a $1 million matching donation. He and his wife Susan have been staunch Opportunity Village advocates for decades and were honored at the organization's 11th annual black-tie gala Camelot in 2012.

The couple were also honored as Las Vegas Philanthropists of the Year in 1997 by the Association of Fundraising Professionals Las Vegas Chapter.

Following the 2017 Las Vegas shooting, Walters anonymously donated $500,000 to the Las Vegas victim's assistance fund, agreeing to release his name after a request by Clark County Commission Chairman Steve Sisolak to generate more interest in fundraising efforts.

In 2021, Billy Walters and his wife Susan donated $1 million to the effort to rebrand the main airport in Las Vegas from the McCarran International Airport to the Harry Reid International Airport.

Walters donated a "substantial gift" in 2022 to HOPE For Prisoners, a Las Vegas nonprofit that assists formerly incarcerated people with re-entry into society. The Billy Walters Center for Second Chances in Las Vegas centralizes some of the organization's services that include vocational training and job placement assistance, education opportunities, and counseling for mental health and substance abuse. In 2023, Walters received the Champion of Hope award from the organization, and it was announced that he gifted another $2 million for a new vocational school at Southern Desert Correctional Center.

== See also ==
- Alan Woods (gambler)
- Terry Ramsden
- Haralabos Voulgaris
