= Ronald William Tullipan =

(1917-1975) Australian author

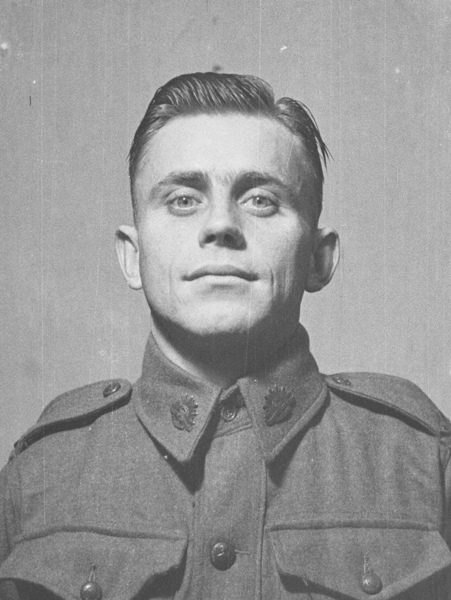
Ronald William Tullipan

Ronald William Tullipan, also known as Ron Tullipan, (10 October 1917 – 24 November 1975) was an Australian author who won the 1961 and 1962 Mary Gilmore Awards.

== Early life and career ==
Tullipan was born in Murwillumbah in New South Wales and was the fourth son of Edgar William and Vera Hilda Tullipan. Because of his father's career as a travelling showman (he was from a prominent circus family), his early schooling was erratic and he described in as 'hit-and-run schooling'. In 1929 his parents divorced and he was sent to live at St Vincent's Orphanage in Nudgee, a suburb of Brisbane.

After leaving the orphanage Tullipan worked at farms throughout New South Wales and Queensland but, during the Great Depression, he travelled extensively to find work and later became a builders labourer.

On 23 October 1937, in Dutton Park, he married Kathrine Mary Power who was 14 years old. They would have 4 children together, 2 of whom died as infants.

== World War II service ==
On 13 July 1941, during World War II, Tullipan enlisted into the Australian Imperial Force and was posted to the 5th Armoured Regiment, then located in Brisbane, and he was immediately frustrated by not being sent the to Middle East. Perhaps due to this he was often punished for disobedience and being absent without leave. He was later posted to the 58th/59th Battalion and sent the Bougainville in November 1944 and was later wounded in action in May 1945. He was discharged from the army on 22 November 1945.

During his army service Tullipan developed a 'fever to write' and, during this period he not only wrote extensively, but also read widely and dissected the work of others.

== Writing career ==
After his return from the war he divorced Kathrine in 1947 and moved to Sydney where he hoped to establish himself as an author. In Sydney he lived with Florence Vivienne (Vi) Murray and, although they never married, she took and her son took on his surname.

While in Sydney Tullipan began publishing short stories, often under the pen name 'Nudgee' (after the orphanage) in magazines and literary journals including The Australian Journal. He also worked as a commercial artist and illustrated numerous publications. He published his first novel The Glass Jaw in the 1940s through Frank Johnson's 'Magpie Series'.

Tullipan and Vi moved to Cairns together in the 1950s, where he worked at the wharfs loading sugar and became involved in union affairs. They then travelled extensively between 1955 and 1960 and that visited the Soviet Union and, later, ran a confectionery shop in London.

In 1960 they returned to Sydney where he published the following books:

- Follow the Sun (1960)
- Rear Vision (1961)
- March into Morning (1962)
- Daylight Robbery (1970)

Rear Vision (1961) and March into Morning (1962) were both partially self-biographical and centred around a young man from an orphanage in Brisbane and they won the 1961 and 1962 Mary Gilmore Awards.

In the 1960s Tullipan also became involved in the Sydney Realist Writers' Group and was president from 1967. He was also on the editorial board of The Sydney Realist between 1967 and 1970.

His final book, Daylight Robbery (1970), was completed even after his house was destroyed by fire in November 1968. Tullipan was most disappointed about losing his extensive library in the fire.

In 1970 Tullipan received a Commonwealth Literary Fund fellowship which was worth $,3000.

== Later life ==
In 1973 Tullipan and Vi returned to Brisbane where he died on 24 November 1975.

== Collections ==
Tullipan's papers (UQFL103) are held at the Fryer Library at the University of Queensland.

His oral history interview, recorded with Hazel de Berg in 1969, is available at the National Library of Australia.
