= Murwillumbah Swamp Beer =

2001 event in Australia

A bottle of Murwillumbah Swamp Beer held at the Tweed Regional Museum, September 2026

Murwillumbah Swamp Beer, also known as Murbah Swamp Beer, is an event which took place over the 2001 Easter weekend in which 40,000 bottles of beer fell into the Tweed River just outside of Murwillumbah in New South Wales, Australia.

Following the incident, and due to delays over the long weekend, many people living in the area dove into the river, often using rafts and canoes, to collect the beer and called the accident "the ultimate dream come true".

== Accident ==
On 13 April 2001 a semi-trailer ran off the Pacific Highway (now Tweed Valley Way), just outside of Murwillumbah, at 2:10 am and fell into the Tweed River causing 40,000 bottles of beer (in 1,000 cartons) to fall into the river. The majority of the bottles were from the Malt Shovel Brewery and were marked with the initials "MSB" which soon became known to local residents as "Murwillumbah Swamp Beer".

The driver was uninjured in the crash and was able to swim out of the water, however, due to it occurring in the early hours of the morning (on Good Friday) the salvage operation for the contents of the truck had to be delayed due to heavy traffic.

== Retrieval ==
By Friday morning, much of the beer that had fallen into the river began to float to the surface and, knowing there was more, many people from the town came to the river and began to collect the beer. Many used snorkels and flippers to do so and even scuba gear; boats, jet skis and bodyboards were also used. The legality of the informal salvage was unclear.

The Tweed Shire Council also issued warnings to those salvaging the beer and stated it should be destroyed due to the risk of contamination.

The incident was reported nationally around Australia.

== Documentary ==
In 2002 a short documentary film was made called Murbah Swamp Beer and it was directed by Gary Doust and produced by Brooke Wilson. It told the story of the crash and the locals' reaction to it primarily through interviews, including a number with a local police officer Stan Single and others with the coach of the under-19s football team whose performance was impacted by the beers' arrival and what he called their downfall. On the film Wilson said: "[i]t captures the spirit of a small, country town as its citizens discover that beer definitely tastes better when it's free."

The film was a finalist in Tropfest 2002 due to its resonance with the audience.

== Anniversary ==
In 2026 the town of Murwillumbah celebrated the 25th anniversary of the event and how it has become a symbol of the town's identity.

Earlier, in 2019, Stone & Wood Brewing Co., on limited release, created the Murbah Swamp Beer which they sold locally to raise money for a community funded hospice.

== Previous incident ==
This was the second vehicle accident involving beer to happen near Murwillumbah with another truck overturning in November 1983. This truck overturned on the highway between Fernvale and Murwillumbah and scattered 45,000 cans of Fosters Beer across 150 metres (490 ft). A security guard called to the incident initially thought that the crash was a stunt by the beer company, as the cargo was a newly released product, however, he changed his mind when he saw the seriousness of the accident and that the driver was trapped in the truck for one and a half hours.

The security guard, Walter Geerz, alongside his dog Basil, prevented the general public from taking the beer for the first few hours after the accident. However, the next day the insurance assessor advised that the beer would all be buried nearby with a bulldozer and, as news spread, many locals with tractors and trailers came and took a "couple of cans".

== See also ==
- 1978 Murwillumbah bank robbery
