= Colossus Bets =

UK-based betting company

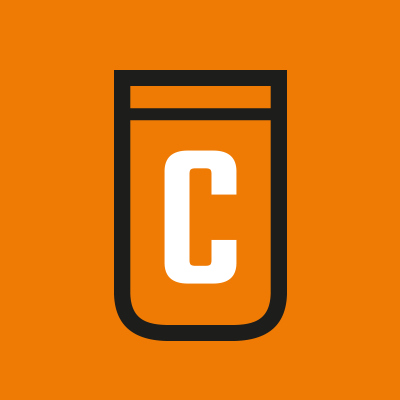
- Industry: Gambling
- Founded: 2013; 13 years ago in UK
- Founder: Bernard Marantelli, Zeljko Ranogajec
- Headquarters: London, England
- Key people: David O'Reilly (CEO)
- Products: Sports betting, sports technology, pools betting
- Website: www.colossusbets.com

Colossus Bets is a British bookmaker in pools betting, headquartered in London. The company was founded by Bernard Marantelli and Zeljko Ranogajec and launched in 2013, and holds US patents covering cash-out and pools-betting functionality.

== History ==
Colossus Bets was launched in the UK in 2013, initially providing solely football pools, with Michael Owen as brand ambassador. It later added horse racing, greyhound racing, American football, ice hockey, basketball and darts pools.

In 2017, Colossus launched Syndicates, a product allowing users to share stakes and winnings. It introduced horse racing pools in the UK in July 2018.

Colossus Bets pools have been integrated into partner sites, including Bet365, Betway Africa and Dafabet. In 2019, the company agreed a long-term licensing agreement giving Bet365 access to its US cash-out patent portfolio, and was granted a totalizator licence by the Oregon Racing Commission.

In August 2017, Colossus Bets entered into a partnership with 54 British racecourses in order to supply betting pools. However, in May 2018 it was revealed that Zeljko Ranogajec was the principal backer of the company using the alias of John Wilson. Subsequently, the consortium of 54 racecourses (Britbet) cancelled their arrangement with Colossus Bets in favour of The Tote.

In October 2020, Marantelli left his role as chief executive and director, remaining with the business in a consultancy role. David O'Reilly was appointed as his successor.

In May 2021 Esports Technologies Inc. (Nasdaq: EBET) announced an exclusive alliance with Colossus Bets. Under the terms of the agreement Colossus Bets became a shareholder in Esports Technologies Inc. Esports Technologies, by then renamed EBET, was delisted from Nasdaq in 2023 amid financial difficulties.

In 2021, Colossus Bets filed patent-infringement proceedings against DraftKings in the United States and against Tabcorp in Australia, alleging unauthorised use of its cash-out functionality. In July 2022, a US magistrate judge in the District of Delaware recommended that seven of the eight patents in the DraftKings case be upheld as valid, while finding one patent invalid. In November 2023, the United States Patent and Trademark Office referred a previously rejected DraftKings challenge to one of the patents to a rehearing panel. In 2024, a new Patent Trial and Appeal Board panel revived the DraftKings challenge, finding that the original petition had been wrongly denied.

In September 2024, Colossus Bets submitted a proposal to replace the Tote as the on-course pool betting provider at British racecourses, with the offer made to Arena Racing Company, the Jockey Club and the Large Independent Racecourses group. The racecourses instead agreed a new deal with the UK Tote Group, running from November 2025 until at least the end of October 2030.

In April 2025, The Wall Street Journal reported that company founders Marantelli and Ranogajec had organised a 2023 operation in which a syndicate purchased nearly every possible number combination in a Texas Lottery draw, winning a jackpot with a lump-sum value of US$57.8 million. The win, together with controversy over online ticket couriers, contributed to 2025 legislation that abolished the Texas Lottery Commission and restricted bulk ticket purchases.

In 2019, Colossus Bets launched Conscious Colossus, a charitable programme that has supported organisations including Alive and Kicking, the Greyhound Trust and the Young Gamers and Gamblers Education Trust (YGAM).
