= Getting out stakes =

The getting out stakes is a slang term in British and Irish horse race betting, referring to the last race of the day. Gamblers who have not won money on other races try to recoup or reduce their losses by betting on the last race at long odds.

Although mostly a slang term, bookmakers themselves have named races as such.
