= Betting on horse racing =

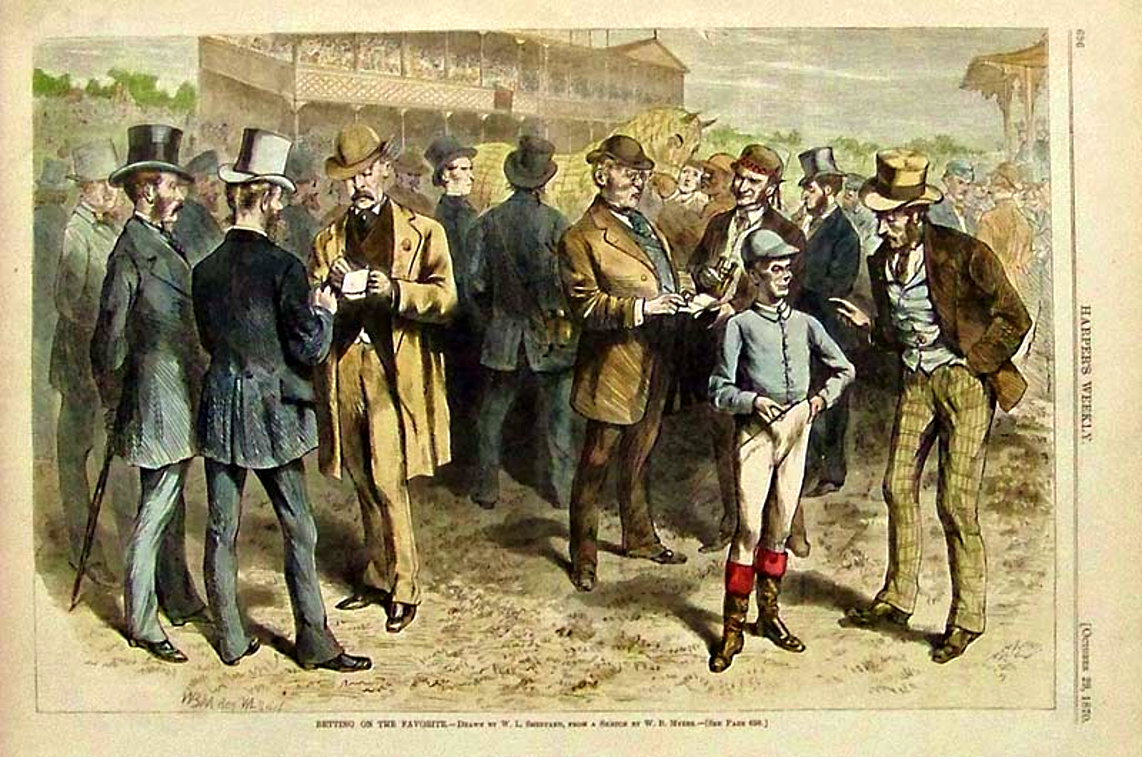
Betting on the Favorite, an 1870 engraving

Betting on horse racing or horse betting commonly occurs at many horse races. Modern horse betting started in Great Britain in the early 1600s during the reign of King James I. Gamblers can stake money on the final placement of the horses taking part in a race. Gambling on horses is, however, prohibited at some racetracks. For example, because of a law passed in 1951, betting is illegal in Springdale Race Course, home of the Toronto-Dominion Bank (TD Bank) Carolina Cup and Colonial Cup Steeplechase in Camden, South Carolina.

Where gambling is allowed, most tracks offer parimutuel betting where gamblers' money is pooled and shared proportionally among the winners once a deduction for purse money to participants, house share and expenses, and a considerable amount of tax revenue has been made from the total. Over $100 billion is wagered annually in 53 countries.

In some countries – notably the UK, Ireland, and Australia – an alternative and more popular facility is provided by bookmakers who effectively make a market in odds. This allows the gambler to 'lock in' odds on a horse at a particular time (known as 'taking the price' in the UK).

== Types of bets ==
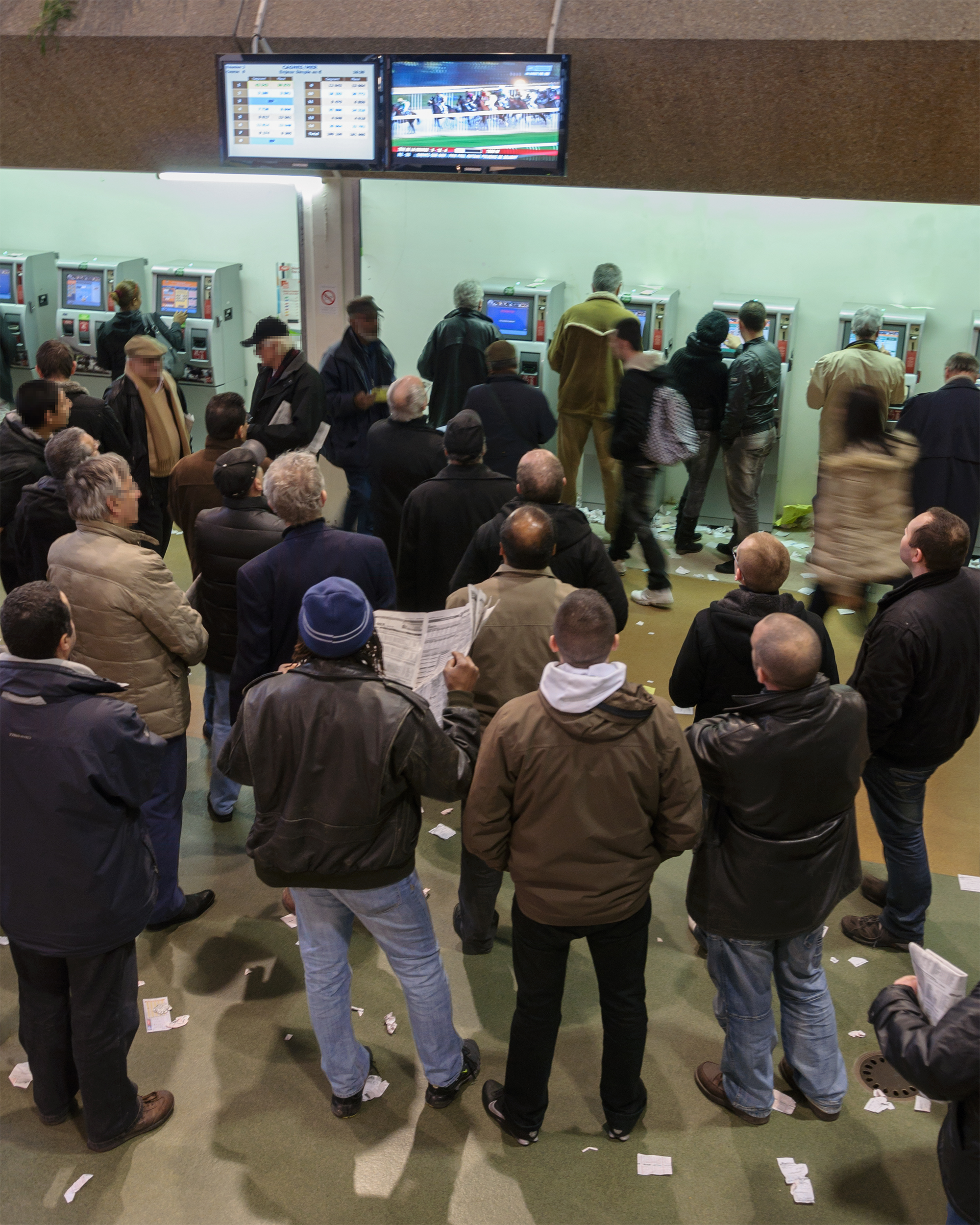
Gamblers awaiting the result of a horse race at the Hippodrome de Vincennes in Paris

In North American racing, the three most common ways to bet money are to win, to place, and to show. A bet to win, sometimes called a "straight" bet, means staking money on the horse, and if it comes in first place, the bet is a winner. In a bet to place, you are betting on your horse to finish either first or second. A bet to show wins if the horse finishes first, second or third. Since the odds become more favorable when a horse is selected to variously finish first, second, or third than it is just to win, the place and show payoffs will be lower than win payoffs. If there are a small number of horses in the race, show or place bets may not be offered (or if bets have already been made, they are cancelled and the wagered amounts refunded).

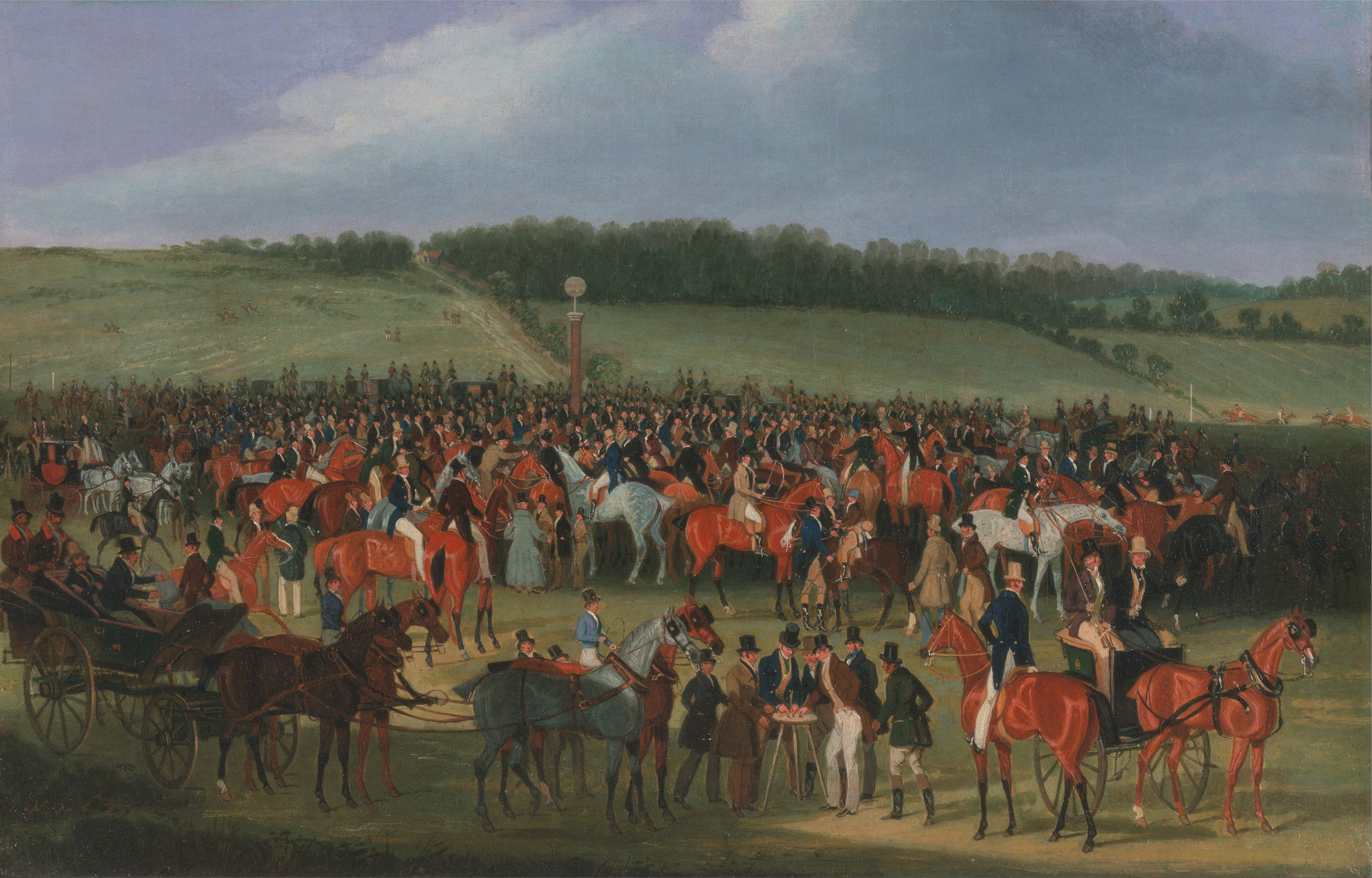
The Epsom Derby betting post, c. 1835

In Europe, Australia, and Asia, betting to place is different since the number of "payout places" varies depending on the size of the field that takes part in the race. For example, in a race with seven or less runners in the UK, only the first two finishers would be considered winning bets with most bookmakers. Three places are paid for eight or more runners, whilst a handicap race with 16 runners or more will see the first four places being classed as "placed". (A show bet in the North American sense does not exist in these locations.)

The term each-way (E/W) bet is used everywhere but North America, and has a different meaning depending on the location. An each-way bet sees the total bet being split in two, with half being placed on the win, and half on the place. Bettors receive a payout if the horse either wins, and/or is placed based on the applicable place criteria. The full odds are paid (plus the place portion) if the horse wins, with a quarter or a fifth of the odds (depending on the race-type and the number of runners) if only the place section of the bet is successful. In the UK some bookmakers will pay for the first five (some independent firms have even paid the first six) for a place on the Grand National. This additional concession is offered because of the large number of runners in the race (maximum 40). Occasionally other handicap races with large fields receive the same treatment from various bookmakers, especially if they are sponsoring the race.

The rough equivalent of the each-way in North America is the across the board (win/place/show) or win/place bet, where equal bets on a horse are made to win, place, and show (or just win and place). Each portion is treated as a separate bet, so an across-the-board bet is merely a convenience for bettors and parimutuel clerks. For instance, if a $2 across-the-board bet (total outlay of $6) were staked on a horse which finished second, paying $4.20 to place and $3.00 to show, the bettor would receive $14.40 ($0.00 win + $8.40 place + $6.00 show) on what is essentially a $6 wager.

In addition to straight wagers, "exotic" wagers offer bettors an opportunity to incorporate the placement of different horses in one or multiple races. The two broad types of exotic wagers are horizontal and vertical: horizontal are bets on multiple horses in one particular race, while vertical involve predicting results across multiple races. Both have specific options for which bets are available.

In the most basic horizontal wager, an exacta, the bettor selects the first and second place horses in the exact order. Picking the first three finishers in exact order is called a trifecta and a superfecta refers to the specific finishing order of the top four horses.

Boxing is a tactic that increases the odds of winning an exotic wager by removing the need to choose the exact order. A quinella, which boxes an exacta (allowing the first two finishers to come in any order and still win), is the basic box, but boxing can be applied to the trifecta and superfecta as well.

A wheel is a bet on a single horse to finish in a specific position, with multiple horses finishing ahead and/or behind it. Thus, a win bet can be thought of as a specific type of wheel bet.

Vertical bets are spread over different races. A daily double is an exotic wager placed on the winner of two consecutive races. Picking the winner of three, four, five or six straight races is referred to as a pick-3, pick-4, pick-5 and pick-6 respectively.

== Betting exchanges ==
In addition to traditional betting with a bookmaker, punters (bettors) are able to both back and lay money on an online betting exchange. Punters who lay the odds are in effect acting as a bookmaker. The odds of a horse are set by the market conditions of the betting exchange which is dictated to by the activity of the members.

=== United States ===
In the United States, betting on horse racing in the United States varies from state to state. The states with the largest pools include California, New York, Kentucky, Florida, Maryland and Illinois. By the late 19th century over 300 tracks were in operation in the country, but those opposed to gambling caused the banning of bookmakers and horse racing at the beginning of the next century. In 1908 pari-mutuel (tote) betting was introduced, helping the industry prosper, which continues to the present day. Pari-mutuel betting is currently legal in 32 US states. Due to new legislation, horse race betting in the US could change significantly in the near future. The legal market handle on horse racing in the United States in 2018 was $11.26 billion, in contrast to expert predictions of the illegal sports betting market being anywhere from $100 billion to $150 billion annually.

==== Kentucky Derby ====
The Kentucky Derby is the most famous horse race in the United States. Known as ‘The Run For The Roses’, it is held on the first Saturday in May at Churchill Downs in Louisville, Kentucky. The one mile two furlong contest dates back to 1875. A total of $149.9 million was wagered on the race in 2019, beating the previous record of $139.2 set the previous year. About one-sixth, $24.6 million of the 2019 total, was gambled online.

=== Hong Kong ===
Hong Kong generates the largest horse racing revenue in the world, and is home to some of the largest horse betting circles, including the Hong Kong Jockey Club. In 2009, Hong Kong generated an average US$12.7 million in gambling turnover per race – 6 times larger than its closest rival (France, at US$2 million), while the United States, which holds far more races, only generated $250,000. Betting on horse racing is ingrained in local culture, and is seen by some as an investment.

The Hong Kong Jockey Club, founded in 1884, gained more per race during the 2014–2015 racing season (about HK$138.8 million (US$17.86 million)) than any other track worldwide. The revenue the club generate from various wagers makes it the largest taxpayer for the government. Hong Kong Jockey Club broke its own record during the 2016–2017 season, with a turnover of HK$216.5 billion, and paid the government HK$21.7 billion in duty and profits tax, an all-time high.

=== Australia ===
A government survey in 2015 found that nearly one million Australians (5.6% of Australian adults) gambled on dog or horse racing in Australia. Most were men aged between 30 and 64 who had a typical yearly expenditure of $1,300 on race betting. Nationally, typical annual race-betting expenditure amounted to roughly $1.27 billion.

Horse race betting in New South Wales (NSW) is conducted by bookmakers (at race meetings and via telephone) and Tabcorp (tote betting at racecourses and through various retail outlets including the internet). In 2014 it was estimated that $300 million alone was bet on Australia's most famous race - the Melbourne Cup.

=== United Kingdom ===
Horse race betting is wide and varied in the UK. Unlike in most other countries where betting exists, the pari-mutual market in the UK is small compared to fixed odds wagering, accounting for only about 5% of the total betting turnover. Between April 2017 and March 2018, off-course horse racing betting turnover in Great Britain amounted to £4.3 billion. The majority of the money wagered on horse racing in the UK is with bookmakers, either in betting shops or online. In 2018, there were 8,500 betting shops in Great Britain. This figure is expected to decrease significantly in 2019 when government restrictions on Fixed Odds Betting Terminals (FOBTs) comes into force.

== See also ==
- Gambling
- Getting out stakes
- Mathematics of bookmaking
- Parimutuel gambling
- Alan Woods (gambler)
- Bill Benter
- Zeljko Ranogajec
