= Robert Hagan (artist) =

Australian artist

- Born: Robert Graeme Hagan; 10 May 1947 (age 78); Murwillumbah, New South Wales, Australia
- Occupations: Television personality, Impressionist artist, Author, Producer
- Television: "'Splash of Color"'
- Website: www.roberthagan.com

Robert Hagan (born 10 May 1947) is an Australian television personality, author, impressionist artist, and producer. He is best known for hosting the Discovery HD/Discovery television show Splash of Color.

== Early life ==
Robert Hagan was born in Murwillumbah, New South Wales and is the third eldest of four children. He graduated from Newcastle University in 1969, and is a self-taught painter and artist.

== Painting ==
Robert Hagan is known for his western, romantic, decorative, adventure, portraiture and maritime paintings.

Hagan's approach to painting is to translate scenes of everyday life into romantic, nostalgic and blissfully peaceful visions of the world. His subjects include the figure in a moment of reflection, animals, children fishing on the beach with their father, sailboats, rainforest birds, cowboys on horseback rounding up cattle or hunched over a campfire after a hard day's droving and dusty outback scenes of Australia.

Although self-taught, Hagan's style is impressionist using a limited palette of oil to impart a sense of tranquility and play on light to make the painting come alive. His brushwork is loose with final strokes of impasto.

Robert Hagan eventually earned a degree of the Doctor of Arts and Professor by International Art Academy in Volos, Greece.

== Books ==
Hagan's book publications include Paintings of Australia (1987), Images of Australia (1993), Romantic Oil Painting Made Easy (1995), Painting Cowboys and the Old West (1997), Cherished Moments (1999), Nostalgic Oil Painting Made Easy (2003), My Australia (2004) and The Art and Adventures of Robert Hagan (2023).

== Television ==
Robert Hagan was the originator/ Executive Producer and host of this 10 part travel/painting series that was licensed in 2010 to Discovery HD and shown internationally in several languages. Production commenced early 2007 and concluded 2009 with USA locations including New Orleans, Fort Worth and Yosemite while Philippines included Puerto Princessa and Banaue. There were 4 episodes filmed in Thailand's Bangkok, Pattaya, Chon Buri and Chiang Mai.

The series was shown in Australia, Singapore, Malaysia, Taiwan, South Korea, Singapore, Indonesia, Poland, Brazil, India and Argentina.

Selected episodes were shown on international air flights.

== DVDs ==
Robert Hagan has produced 5 instructional painting DVDs including 'Billy and Buddy at the Beach', 'Country Cousins', 'Cattle Drive', 'Mountain Men and 'Bathing Elephants'.
