= Bill Benter =

American professional gambler

- Born: William Benter; 1957 (age 68–69); Pittsburgh, Pennsylvania, U.S.
- Education: Case Western Reserve University; University of Bristol
- Occupations: Professor; Businessman; Gambler
- Years active: 1984 –present
- Spouse: Vivian Fung (m. 2012)
- Children: 1

William Benter (born 1957) is an American professional gambler and philanthropist who focuses on horse betting. Benter earned nearly $1 billion through the development of one of the most successful analysis computer software programs in the horse racing market and is considered to be the most successful gambler of all time.

Benter has served as president of the Hong Kong Rotary Club, founded the Benter Foundation, is chairman and International CEO of Acusis LLC in Pittsburgh, Pennsylvania, and occasionally lectures university students on subjects like statistics and mathematical probability.

Benter is a philanthropist donating to charitable causes both in Hong Kong and the United States.

== Early life and career ==
William Benter was born and raised in Pittsburgh, Pennsylvania. As he grew up, he wanted to use his mathematical talents to make a profit, so immediately after finishing a university physics degree in 1977, he went to the blackjack tables in Las Vegas and used his skills to count cards. He came across the book Beat the Dealer by Edward O. Thorp, which helped him improve his methods. Seven years later, he was banned from all of the Vegas strip's casinos.

Benter then met with Alan Woods, a like-minded gambler whose expertise in horse racing complemented his own in computers. The two became racing partners and in 1984, moved to Hong Kong. Starting with US$150,000 (equivalent to US$464,846 in 2025), the pair relied on their mathematical skill to create a formula for choosing race winners.

Using his statistical model, Benter identified factors that could lead to successful race predictions. He found that some came out as more important than others. Refining his software, he ended up winning $600,000 in 1988 and hit $3 million in profits the following year. Benter later worked with Robert Moore.

Benter is a visiting professor at the Southampton Management School as part of the Centre for Risk Research and a fellow of the British Royal Statistical Society.

In 2007, Benter founded the Benter Foundation. The Benter Foundation focuses on local education and the arts, and is housed in three floors of the Benedum Trees Building in downtown Pittsburgh. Benter also restored the original lobby of the original stock market building.

== Personal life ==
In March 2010, Benter married Hong Kong national Vivian Fung in a Tibetan Buddhist rite. In 2015, they had their first child Henry. Benter is currently residing in Pittsburgh.

=== Philanthropy ===
Benter is a big contributor to charity and political groups. According to political campaign contribution records, in 2008 Benter and Acusis were listed as donors to Barack Obama's presidential campaign and the Democratic Party of Virginia. In 2010, The Advantage Trust donated to Israeli-based organization Rabbis for Human Rights. The Atlantic reported in 2010 that Benter had raised and given at least US$800,000 in support to J Street.

In 2012, Benter donated one million dollars to the University of Pittsburgh. In 2013, Fox News reported that Benter donated thousands of dollars for pro-Hagel ads in Politico when he was nominated to be next Secretary of Defense by President Obama.

In 2016, The Washington Post reported the Benter raised US$100,000 for A New Voice for Maryland, a pro-Joel Rubin group for Democratic nomination in Maryland's 8th Congressional District.

== See also ==
- Hong Kong Jockey Club
- Gambling in Hong Kong
- David Walsh (art collector)

== Bibliography ==
- Hausch, Donald B.; Lo, Victor S. Y.; Ziemba, W. T. (2008). Efficiency of Racetrack Betting Markets. World Scientific. pp. 183–198. ISBN 9789812819192.
