= Alan Woods (gambler) =

Australian professional gambler

- Born: 1945; Murwillumbah, New South Wales, Australia
- Died: 26 January 2008 (aged 62); Hong Kong
- Occupations: Mathematician businessman gambler
- Spouse: Meredith Woods
- Children: 2

Alan Woods (1945 – 26 January 2008) was an Australian and Hong Kong professional gambler and mathematician. He focused on blackjack and betting on horse racing, working with Bill Benter and Zeljko Ranogajec, and was an early developer of quantitative, computer-based betting on Hong Kong horse racing. His estimated net worth at his death was AU$670 million, with later estimates higher, including about A$939 million cited by Guinness World Records.

== Early life ==
Woods was raised in Murwillumbah, New South Wales, Australia. He studied mathematics at the University of New England in Armidale but dropped out in his final year before graduating. As a student he played poker machines at a loss, stopping after he moved to Sydney where they were unavailable. He also took up horse betting during college and worked for a time as an insurance actuary.

== Gambling career ==
Woods learned card counting in blackjack from fellow bridge players and won a few thousand dollars testing the method. He began gambling seriously after his wife left him in 1979, winning $16,000 in four months in Hobart and a further $100,000 in Las Vegas. He then played in casinos across Europe, Australia and Asia.

Woods retired from professional blackjack in 1982 and turned to horse betting in Hong Kong, which had a small pool of horses. There he met Bob Moore and Bill Benter, with whom he developed a computer model that selected race winners from factors such as track, form and weather. The model returned about $100,000 in the 1987 season, after which Woods and Benter dissolved their partnership.

Woods later worked in Manila with Zeljko Ranogajec, whom he also regarded as a rival, and won millions from horse betting through the 1990s. By the 2006–07 financial year, his syndicate was reported to account for about 2 per cent of the Hong Kong Jockey Club's betting turnover.

== Personal life ==
Woods married Meredith in 1972 and separated from her in 1979. They had two children. He opposed the Iraq War and described himself as a former conservative turned liberal.

From 1999 until his death he was a member and major funder of the online harm reduction forum Bluelight, covering its running costs as it grew to more than 80,000 members.

=== Death ===
Woods died of appendiceal cancer on 25 January 2008 shortly after he was diagnosed.

== See also ==
- Billy Walters (gambler)
