= Electoral results for the district of Byron =

Election results for Byron, New South Wales, Australia

Byron, an electoral district of the Legislative Assembly in the Australian state of New South Wales was created in 1913 and abolished in 1988.

Election	Member	Party				
1913	John Perry	Liberal Reform				
1917	John Perry	Nationalist	Member	Party	Member	Party
1920	Tom Swiney	Labor	George Nesbitt	Nationalist	Stephen Perdriau	Progressive
1922	William Missingham	Progressive	George Nesbitt	Nationalist	Stephen Perdriau	Nationalist
1925	William Missingham	Progressive	Robert Gillies	Labor	Frederick Stuart	Progressive
1927	Arthur Budd	Country				
1930	Arthur Budd	Country				
1932	Arthur Budd	Country				
1935	Arthur Budd	Country				
1938	Arthur Budd	Country				
1941	Arthur Budd	Country				
1944	Stanley Stephens	Country				
1947	Stanley Stephens	Country				
1950	Stanley Stephens	Country				
1953	Stanley Stephens	Country				
1956	Stanley Stephens	Country				
1959	Stanley Stephens	Country				
1962	Stanley Stephens	Country				
1968	Stanley Stephens	Country				
1971	Stanley Stephens	Country				
1973 by	Jack Boyd	Country				
1973	Jack Boyd	Country				
1976	Jack Boyd	Country				
1978	Jack Boyd	Country				
1981	Jack Boyd	National Country				
1984	Don Beck	National				

== Election results ==
=== Elections in the 1980s ===
==== 1984 ====
1984 New South Wales state election: Byron
Party	Candidate	Votes	%	±%
National	Don Beck	15,860	45.4	−6.8
Labor	Lyle Robb	14,586	41.8	−2.1
Independent	Alan Mountain	1,704	4.9	+4.9
Democrats	Kenneth Nicholson	1,631	4.7	+0.8
Independent	James Mangleson	1,133	3.2	+3.2
Total formal votes		34,914	98.1	+0.7
Informal votes		658	1.9	−0.7
Turnout		35,572	89.5	−0.7
Two-party-preferred result
National	Don Beck	17,431	50.8	−3.5
Labor	Lyle Robb	16,850	49.2	+3.5
National hold		Swing	−3.5	

==== 1981 ====
1981 New South Wales state election: Byron
Party	Candidate	Votes	%	±%
National Country	Jack Boyd	15,855	52.2	+2.0
Labor	Thomas Hogan	13,334	43.9	+1.3
Democrats	Kenneth Nicholson	1,170	3.9	−0.9
Total formal votes		30,359	97.4	
Informal votes		821	2.6	
Turnout		31,180	90.2	
Two-party-preferred result
National Country	Jack Boyd	15,955	54.3	+0.7
Labor	Thomas Hogan	13,434	45.7	−0.7
National Country hold		Swing	+0.7	

=== Elections in the 1970s ===
==== 1978 ====
1978 New South Wales state election: Byron
Party	Candidate	Votes	%	±%
National Country	Jack Boyd	12,553	50.2	−9.7
Labor	Thomas Hogan	10,660	42.6	+2.5
Democrats	Marcia Ritchie	1,210	4.8	+4.8
Marijuana	Raymond Hunter	593	2.4	+2.4
Total formal votes		25,016	98.5	−0.1
Informal votes		388	1.5	+0.1
Turnout		25,404	92.0	+0.8
Two-party-preferred result
National Country	Jack Boyd	13,406	53.6	−6.3
Labor	Thomas Hogan	11,610	46.4	+6.3
National Country hold		Swing	−6.3	

==== 1976 ====
1976 New South Wales state election: Byron
Party	Candidate	Votes	%	±%
Country	Jack Boyd	13,396	59.9	−1.9
Labor	Keith Enderbury	8,979	40.1	+7.3
Total formal votes		22,375	98.6	−0.1
Informal votes		318	1.4	+0.1
Turnout		22,693	91.2	−1.3
Country hold		Swing	−4.4	

==== 1973 ====
1973 New South Wales state election: Byron
Party	Candidate	Votes	%	±%
Country	Jack Boyd	12,397	61.8	+7.3
Labor	James Constable	6,589	32.8	−12.7
Australia	Brian Halesworth	1,083	5.4	+5.4
Total formal votes		20,069	98.7	
Informal votes		257	1.3	
Turnout		20,326	92.5	
Two-party-preferred result
Country	Jack Boyd	12,900	64.3	+9.8
Labor	James Constable	7,169	35.7	−9.8
Country hold		Swing	+9.8	

==== 1973 by-election ====
1973 Byron by-election Saturday 17 February
Party	Candidate	Votes	%	±%
Country	Jack Boyd	6,397	35.9	
Labor	James Constable	7,535	42.3	−3.2
Country	Colville Vincent	3,584	20.1	
Australia	Clemens Vermeulen	314	1.8	
Total formal votes		17,830	98.7	+0.2
Informal votes		227	1.3	−0.2
Turnout		18,057	88.5	−3.5
Two-party-preferred result
Country	Jack Boyd	9,584	54.5	−0.8
Labor	James Constable	7,976	45.5	+0.8
Country hold		Swing	−0.8	

Stanley Stephens (Country) resigned.

==== 1971 ====
1971 New South Wales state election: Byron
Party	Candidate	Votes	%	±%
Country	Stanley Stephens	9,476	54.5	−5.8
Labor	James Constable	7,905	45.5	+5.8
Total formal votes		17,381	98.5	
Informal votes		259	1.5	
Turnout		17,640	91.9	
Country hold		Swing	−5.8	

=== Elections in the 1960s ===
==== 1968 ====
1968 New South Wales state election: Byron
Party	Candidate	Votes	%	±%
Country	Stanley Stephens	12,646	60.2	−4.0
Labor	James Constable	8,342	39.8	+4.0
Total formal votes		20,988	98.3	
Informal votes		353	1.6	
Turnout		21,341	94.5	
Country hold		Swing	−4.0	

==== 1965 ====
1965 New South Wales state election: Byron
Party	Candidate	Votes	%	±%
Country	Stanley Stephens	10,644	64.2	+6.0
Labor	James Constable	5,933	35.8	−6.0
Total formal votes		16,577	98.8	−0.6
Informal votes		199	1.2	+0.6
Turnout		16,776	93.9	−0.2
Country hold		Swing	+6.0	

==== 1962 ====
1962 New South Wales state election: Byron
Party	Candidate	Votes	%	±%
Country	Stanley Stephens	9,831	58.2	−41.8
Labor	James Constable	7,045	41.8	+41.8
Total formal votes		16,876	99.4	
Informal votes		109	0.6	
Turnout		16,985	94.1	
Country hold		Swing	N/A	

=== Elections in the 1950s ===
==== 1959 ====
1959 New South Wales state election: Byron
Party	Candidate	Votes	%	±%
Country	Stanley Stephens	unopposed		
Country hold				

==== 1956 ====
1956 New South Wales state election: Byron
Party	Candidate	Votes	%	±%
Country	Stanley Stephens	11,394	70.3	−29.7
Independent	Archibald Johnston	4,805	29.7	+29.7
Total formal votes		16,199	98.8	
Informal votes		198	1.2	
Turnout		16,397	92.1	
Country hold		Swing	N/A	

==== 1953 ====
1953 New South Wales state election: Byron
Party	Candidate	Votes	%	±%
Country	Stanley Stephens	unopposed		
Country hold				

==== 1950 ====
1950 New South Wales state election: Byron
Party	Candidate	Votes	%	±%
Country	Stanley Stephens	unopposed		
Country hold				

=== Elections in the 1940s ===
==== 1947 ====
1947 New South Wales state election: Byron
Party	Candidate	Votes	%	±%
Country	Stanley Stephens	10,485	68.2	+33.4
Independent	Rodger Pendergast	3,502	22.8	+22.8
Independent	Christopher Grant	1,383	9.0	+9.0
Total formal votes		15,370	98.7	+1.0
Informal votes		203	1.3	−1.0
Turnout		15,573	93.0	+3.5
Country hold		Swing	N/A	

- Preferences were not distributed.

==== 1944 ====
1944 New South Wales state election: Byron
Party	Candidate	Votes	%	±%
Country	Stanley Stephens	4,598	34.8	−21.3
Labor	Arthur Dodd	3,848	29.1	+29.1
Country	Frederick Stuart	2,232	16.9	+16.9
Country	Alick Buckley	2,056	15.6	+15.6
Independent Labor	John Regan	469	3.6	+3.6
Total formal votes		13,203	97.7	+0.5
Informal votes		307	2.3	−0.5
Turnout		13,510	89.5	−4.9
Two-party-preferred result
Country	Stanley Stephens	8,239	62.4	+6.3
Labor	Arthur Dodd	4,964	37.6	+37.6
Country hold		Swing	N/A	

==== 1941 ====
1941 New South Wales state election: Byron
Party	Candidate	Votes	%	±%
Country	Arthur Budd	7,867	56.1	
Independent	Frederick Stuart	6,157	43.9	
Total formal votes		14,004	97.2	
Informal votes		405	2.8	
Turnout		14,429	93.4	
Country hold		Swing		

=== Elections in the 1930s ===
==== 1938 ====
1938 New South Wales state election: Byron
Party	Candidate	Votes	%	±%
Country	Arthur Budd	7,986	57.7	+5.5
Independent	Frederick Stuart	5,849	42.3	+19.9
Total formal votes		13,835	97.6	−0.8
Informal votes		340	2.4	+0.8
Turnout		14,175	94.8	+0.3
Country hold		Swing	N/A	

==== 1935 ====
1935 New South Wales state election: Byron
Party	Candidate	Votes	%	±%
Country	Arthur Budd	7,012	52.2	−26.6
Labor (NSW)	John Rogan	3,396	25.3	+4.1
Independent	Frederick Stuart	3,012	22.4	+22.4
Total formal votes		13,420	98.4	+0.1
Informal votes		214	1.6	−0.1
Turnout		13,634	94.5	−1.7
Country hold		Swing	N/A	

- Preferences were not distributed.

==== 1932 ====
1932 New South Wales state election: Byron
Party	Candidate	Votes	%	±%
Country	Arthur Budd	9,733	78.8	−21.2
Labor (NSW)	Fred Crowther	2,613	21.2	+21.2
Total formal votes		12,346	98.2	
Informal votes		230	1.8	
Turnout		12,576	96.1	
Country hold		Swing	N/A	

==== 1930 ====
1930 New South Wales state election: Byron
Party	Candidate	Votes	%	±%
Country	Arthur Budd	unopposed		
Country hold				

=== Elections in the 1920s ===
==== 1927 ====
1927 New South Wales state election: Byron
Party	Candidate	Votes	%	±%
Independent Country	Frederick Stuart (defeated)	4,316	37.2	
Country	Arthur Budd	4,265	36.8	
Labor	Mark Graham	1,569	13.5	
Independent Labor	Robert Gillies (defeated)	1,449	12.5	
Total formal votes		11,599	97.5	
Informal votes		302	2.5	
Turnout		11,901	82.6	
Two-candidate-preferred result
Country	Arthur Budd	4,940	51.9	
Independent Country	Frederick Stuart	4,584	48.1	
Country win		(new seat)		

==== 1925 ====
1925 New South Wales state election: Byron
Party	Candidate	Votes	%	±%
Quota		7,684		
Progressive	William Missingham (elected 1)	10,097	32.9	+22.6
Progressive	Frederick Stuart (elected 3)	3,307	10.8	+10.8
Progressive	John Williams	2,683	8.7	+8.7
Progressive	Thomas Foyster	381	1.2	+1.2
Labor	Robert Gillies (elected 2)	5,775	18.8	+18.8
Labor	Tom Swiney	4,061	13.2	−9.3
Labor	Ernest Hollis-Neath	232	0.8	+0.8
Nationalist	Stephen Perdriau (defeated)	3,501	11.4	−11.2
Nationalist	Charles Munro	469	1.5	+1.5
Nationalist	Stanley Fayle	226	0.7	+0.7
Total formal votes		30,732	97.5	+0.3
Informal votes		790	2.5	−0.3
Turnout		31,522	69.8	−1.0
Party total votes
Progressive		16,468	53.6	+32.2
Labor		10,068	32.8	+9.0
Nationalist		4,196	13.6	−41.2

==== 1922 ====
1922 New South Wales state election: Byron
Party	Candidate	Votes	%	±%
Nationalist	George Nesbitt (elected 1)	8,672	28.8	+5.2
Nationalist	Stephen Perdriau (elected 2)	6,813	22.6	+22.6
Nationalist	John Williams	1,000	3.3	+3.3
Labor	Tom Swiney (defeated)	6,782	22.5	+2.9
Labor	Roger Kiely	277	0.9	+0.9
Labor	Thomas Reidy	94	0.3	+0.3
Progressive	William Missingham (elected 3)	3,084	10.2	0.0
Progressive	William Zuill	2,740	9.1	+9.1
Progressive	Stephen Blackman	632	2.1	+2.1
Total formal votes		30,094	97.2	+4.1
Informal votes		867	2.8	−4.1
Turnout		30,961	70.8	+15.1
Party total votes
Nationalist		16,485	54.8	+21.9
Labor		7,153	23.8	+3.0
Progressive		6,456	21.4	−9.1

==== 1920 ====
1920 New South Wales state election: Byron
Party	Candidate	Votes	%	±%
Quota		5,103		
Nationalist	George Nesbitt (elected 1)	4,815	23.6	
Nationalist	William Zuill (defeated)	1,901	9.3	
Progressive	Stephen Perdriau (elected 2)	3,384	16.6	
Progressive	William Missingham	2,092	10.2	
Progressive	Duncan Nicholson	750	3.7	
Labor	Tom Swiney (elected 3)	3,992	19.6	
Labor	Roger Ryan	257	1.3	
Independent	James McDougall	1,385	6.8	
Independent	Percy Tighe	1,119	5.5	
Independent	John Yates	646	3.2	
Independent	William McKeever	43	0.2	
Independent	Thomas Winterton	25	0.1	
Total formal votes		20,409	93.1	
Informal votes		1,516	6.9	
Turnout		21,925	55.7	
Party total votes
Nationalist		6,716	32.9	
Progressive		6,226	30.5	
Labor		4,249	20.7	
Independent	James McDougall	1,385	6.8	
Independent	Percy Tighe	1,119	5.5	
Independent	John Yates	646	3.2	
Independent	William McKeever	43	0.2	
Independent	Thomas Winterton	25	0.1	

=== Elections in the 1910s ===
==== 1917 ====
1917 New South Wales state election: Byron
Party	Candidate	Votes	%	±%
Nationalist	John Perry	2,572	38.6	−12.4
Independent	Oliver Virtue	2,516	37.7	+37.7
Independent	Patrick McMahon	1,055	15.8	+15.8
Independent Labor	Percy Tighe	496	7.4	+7.4
Independent	William McKeever	29	0.4	+0.4
Total formal votes		6,668	97.9	+0.4
Informal votes		142	2.1	−0.4
Turnout		6,810	57.8	−7.0
Second round result
Nationalist	John Perry	3,445	52.2	
Independent	Oliver Virtue	3,153	47.8	
Total formal votes		6,598	99.3	+1.4
Informal votes		43	0.7	−1.4
Turnout		6,641	56.3	−1.5
Nationalist hold				

==== 1913 ====
1913 New South Wales state election: Byron
Party	Candidate	Votes	%	±%
Liberal Reform	John Perry	3,433	51.0	
Independent Liberal	Peter Street	2,416	35.9	
Independent	Robert Campbell	792	11.8	
Independent	John Pearson	86	1.3	
Total formal votes		6,727	97.5	
Informal votes		170	2.5	
Turnout		6,897	64.8	
Liberal Reform win		(new seat)		
