= Electoral results for the district of Lismore =

Election results for Lismore, New South Wales, Australia

Lismore, an electoral district of the Legislative Assembly in the Australian state of New South Wales, has had three incarnations, the first from 1894 to 1904, the second from 1913 to 1920 and the third from 1927 until the present.

== Members for Lismore ==
First incarnation (1894–1904)
Election	Member	Party
1894	Thomas Ewing	Protectionist
1895	Thomas Ewing	Protectionist
1898	Thomas Ewing	Protectionist
1901	John Coleman	Independent Liberal
Second incarnation (1913–1920)
Election	Member	Party
1913	George Nesbitt	Liberal Reform
1917	George Nesbitt	Nationalist
Third incarnation (1927–present)
Election	Member	Party
1927	William Missingham	Country
1930	William Missingham	Country
1932	William Missingham	Country
1933 by	William Frith	Country
1935	William Frith	Country
1938	William Frith	Country
1941	William Frith	Country
1944	William Frith	Country
1947	William Frith	Country
1950	William Frith	Country
1953	Jack Easter	Country
1956	Jack Easter	Country
1959	Jack Easter	Country
1959 by	Keith Compton	Labor
1962	Keith Compton	Labor
1965	Bruce Duncan	Country
1968	Bruce Duncan	Country
1971	Bruce Duncan	Country
1973	Bruce Duncan	Country
1976	Bruce Duncan	National Country
1978	Bruce Duncan	National Country
1981	Bruce Duncan	National Country
1984	Bruce Duncan	Independent
1988	Bill Rixon	National
1991	Bill Rixon	National
1995	Bill Rixon	National
1999	Thomas George	National
2003	Thomas George	National
2007	Thomas George	National
2011	Thomas George	National
2015	Thomas George	National
2019	Janelle Saffin	Labor
2023	Janelle Saffin	Labor

== Election results ==
=== Elections in the 2020s ===
==== 2023 ====
2023 New South Wales state election: Lismore
Party	Candidate	Votes	%	±%
Labor	Janelle Saffin	21,615	44.4	+19.0
National	Alex Rubin	13,581	27.9	−11.2
Greens	Adam Guise	6,979	14.3	−10.8
Shooters, Fishers, Farmers	Matthew Bertalli	3,347	6.9	+6.9
Animal Justice	Vanessa Rosayro	1,196	2.5	0.0
Independent	James McKenzie	791	1.6	+1.6
Sustainable Australia	Ross Honniball	666	1.4	−0.2
Independent	Allen Crosthwaite	511	1.0	+1.0
Total formal votes		48,686	97.4	+0.4
Informal votes		1,312	2.6	−0.4
Turnout		49,998	87.1	−1.1
Two-party-preferred result
Labor	Janelle Saffin	28,163	65.0	+13.0
National	Alex Rubin	15,172	35.0	−13.0
Labor hold		Swing	+13.0	

=== Elections in the 2010s ===
==== 2019 ====
2019 New South Wales state election: Lismore
Party	Candidate	Votes	%	±%
National	Austin Curtin	19,104	39.68	−2.78
Labor	Janelle Saffin	12,328	25.61	−0.02
Greens	Sue Higginson	11,693	24.29	−2.14
Independent	Greg Bennett	2,530	5.26	+5.25
Animal Justice	Alison Waters	1,184	2.46	+0.94
Sustainable Australia	David Taylor	742	1.54	+1.54
Conservatives	Paul Collits	564	1.17	+1.17
Total formal votes		48,145	96.96	−0.82
Informal votes		1,508	3.04	+0.82
Turnout		49,653	88.50	−1.29
Two-party-preferred result
Labor	Janelle Saffin	21,856	51.35	+1.57
National	Austin Curtin	20,710	48.65	−1.57
Labor gain from National		Swing	+1.57	

==== 2015 ====
2015 New South Wales state election: Lismore
Party	Candidate	Votes	%	±%
National	Thomas George	19,975	42.5	−17.2
Greens	Adam Guise	12,435	26.4	+7.4
Labor	Isaac Smith	12,056	25.6	+12.7
Christian Democrats	Gianpiero Battista	1,339	2.8	+1.1
Animal Justice	Cherie Imlah	717	1.5	+1.5
No Land Tax	Alan Jones	525	1.1	+1.1
Total formal votes		47,047	97.8	+0.2
Informal votes		1,067	2.2	−0.2
Turnout		48,114	89.8	+0.8
Notional two-party-preferred count
National	Thomas George	21,247	50.2	−24.1
Labor	Isaac Smith	21,055	49.8	+24.1
Two-candidate-preferred result
National	Thomas George	21,654	52.9	−21.5
Greens	Adam Guise	19,309	47.1	+21.5
National hold		Swing	−21.5	

==== 2011 ====
2011 New South Wales state election: Lismore
Party	Candidate	Votes	%	±%
National	Thomas George	27,371	61.2	+7.0
Greens	Susan Stock	9,157	20.5	+2.7
Labor	Andrew Moy	5,902	13.2	−12.4
Independent	Russell Kilarney	1,514	3.4	+3.4
Christian Democrats	Margaret Kay	801	1.8	+1.8
Total formal votes		44,745	98.0	−0.4
Informal votes		921	2.0	+0.4
Turnout		45,666	90.8	
Notional two-party-preferred count
National	Thomas George	29,046	74.3	+14.3
Labor	Andrew Moy	10,041	25.7	−14.3
Two-candidate-preferred result
National	Thomas George	28,993	70.2	+10.2
Greens	Susan Stock	12,307	29.8	+29.8
National hold		Swing	+10.2	

=== Elections in the 2000s ===
==== 2007 ====
2007 New South Wales state election: Lismore
Party	Candidate	Votes	%	±%
National	Thomas George	23,620	54.2	+3.4
Labor	Peter Lanyon	11,155	25.6	−1.9
Greens	Andy Gough	7,726	17.7	+0.6
Democrats	Julia Melland	1,086	2.5	+1.0
Total formal votes		43,587	98.4	−0.1
Informal votes		698	1.6	+0.1
Turnout		44,285	91.8	
Two-party-preferred result
National	Thomas George	24,505	60.0	+1.8
Labor	Peter Lanyon	16,340	40.0	−1.8
National hold		Swing	+1.8	

==== 2003 ====
2003 New South Wales state election: Lismore
Party	Candidate	Votes	%	±%
National	Thomas George	21,680	55.9	+16.7
Labor	Peter Lanyon	9,703	25.0	−2.7
Greens	John Corkill	5,797	15.0	+5.3
Independent	Angela Griffiths	724	1.9	+1.9
Democrats	Julia Melland	592	1.5	−1.8
Socialist Alliance	Nick Fredman	261	0.7	+0.7
Total formal votes		38,757	98.4	+0.3
Informal votes		614	1.6	−0.3
Turnout		39,371	92.3	
Two-party-preferred result
National	Thomas George	22,359	62.8	+4.3
Labor	Peter Lanyon	13,220	37.2	−4.3
National hold		Swing	+4.3	

=== Elections in the 1990s ===
==== 1999 ====
1999 New South Wales state election: Lismore
Party	Candidate	Votes	%	±%
National	Thomas George	15,238	39.2	−19.2
Labor	Kevin Bell	10,779	27.7	+3.4
Liberal	John Howard	5,260	13.5	+13.5
Greens	John Corkill	3,784	9.7	+8.4
Christian Democrats	Ray Dhu	1,426	3.7	+3.7
Democrats	Matthew Walsh	1,270	3.3	−0.3
Democratic Socialist	Bernie Wunsch	322	0.8	+0.8
Independent	Judy Canales	311	0.8	+0.8
Earthsave	Ray Thorpe	300	0.8	+0.8
Timbarra Clean Water	Matthew Ward	217	0.6	+0.6
Total formal votes		38,907	98.2	+2.0
Informal votes		725	1.8	−2.0
Turnout		39,632	93.8	
Two-party-preferred result
National	Thomas George	19,293	58.5	−5.8
Labor	Kevin Bell	13,675	41.5	+5.8
National hold		Swing	−5.8	

==== 1995 ====
1995 New South Wales state election: Lismore
Party	Candidate	Votes	%	±%
National	Bill Rixon	19,292	57.8	+0.3
Labor	John Maxwell	8,260	24.8	−3.2
Independent	Prohibition End	2,457	7.4	+7.4
Independent	Cheryl Baxter	1,583	4.7	+4.7
Democrats	Allan Quartly	1,163	3.5	−2.8
The Country Party	John Spence	605	1.8	+1.8
Total formal votes		33,360	96.0	+1.7
Informal votes		1,408	4.0	−1.7
Turnout		34,768	93.8	
Two-party-preferred result
National	Bill Rixon	20,403	63.7	+1.4
Labor	John Maxwell	11,646	36.3	−1.4
National hold		Swing	+1.4	

==== 1991 ====
1991 New South Wales state election: Lismore
Party	Candidate	Votes	%	±%
National	Bill Rixon	18,301	57.6	−8.1
Labor	Janelle Saffin	8,875	27.9	+2.5
Democrats	Anne Simons	1,993	6.3	−0.1
Greens	Joy Wallace	1,471	4.6	+4.6
Independent	Bob Hopkins	1,156	3.6	+3.6
Total formal votes		31,796	94.3	−3.6
Informal votes		1,930	5.7	+3.6
Turnout		33,726	94.2	
Two-party-preferred result
National	Bill Rixon	19,204	62.2	−8.2
Labor	Janelle Saffin	11,661	37.8	+8.2
National hold		Swing	−8.2	

=== Elections in the 1980s ===
==== 1988 ====
1988 New South Wales state election: Lismore
Party	Candidate	Votes	%	±%
National	Bill Rixon	19,493	65.0	+47.0
Labor	Kenneth Gallen	7,664	25.6	−3.5
Democrats	Stanley Gibbs	2,093	7.0	+5.5
Independent	Jon Axtens	719	2.4	+2.4
Total formal votes		29,969	97.9	−0.9
Informal votes		644	2.1	+0.9
Turnout		30,613	94.2	
Two-party-preferred result
National	Bill Rixon	20,387	69.9	+0.1
Labor	Kenneth Gallen	8,782	30.1	−0.1
National gain from Independent		Swing	N/A	

==== 1984 ====
1984 New South Wales state election: Lismore
Party	Candidate	Votes	%	±%
Independent Country	Bruce Duncan	25,227	75.7	+75.7
Labor	Claire Newton	7,340	22.0	−9.1
Democrats	Ivor Brown	767	2.3	+2.3
Total formal votes		33,334	98.9	+0.7
Informal votes		381	1.1	−0.7
Turnout		33,715	92.5	+0.8
Two-candidate-preferred result
Independent Country	Bruce Duncan		76.9	+76.9
Labor	Claire Newton		23.1	−8.0
Member changed to Independent Country from National		Swing	N/A	

==== 1981 ====
1981 New South Wales state election: Lismore
Party	Candidate	Votes	%	±%
National Country	Bruce Duncan	20,848	68.9	+8.3
Labor	Alan Veacock	9,419	31.1	−2.0
Total formal votes		30,267	98.2	
Informal votes		555	1.8	
Turnout		30,822	91.7	
National Country hold		Swing	+5.1	

=== Elections in the 1970s ===
==== 1978 ====
1978 New South Wales state election: Lismore
Party	Candidate	Votes	%	±%
National Country	Bruce Duncan	15,144	60.6	−39.4
Labor	William Slade	8,262	33.1	+33.1
Democrats	Shirley Ryan	1,567	6.3	+6.3
Total formal votes		24,973	98.8	
Informal votes		298	1.2	
Turnout		25,271	93.8	
Two-party-preferred result
National Country	Bruce Duncan	15,927	63.8	−36.2
Labor	William Slade	9,046	36.2	+36.2
National Country hold		Swing	−36.2	

==== 1976 ====
1976 New South Wales state election: Lismore
Party	Candidate	Votes	%	±%
Country	Bruce Duncan	unopposed		
Country hold				

==== 1973 ====
1973 New South Wales state election: Lismore
Party	Candidate	Votes	%	±%
Country	Bruce Duncan	15,120	71.8	−28.2
Labor	Frederick Braid	5,105	24.2	+24.2
Democratic Labor	William Hunt	576	2.7	+2.7
Independent	William Hargrave	258	1.2	+1.2
Total formal votes		21,059	98.5	
Informal votes		329	1.5	
Turnout		21,388	93.1	
Two-party-preferred result
Country	Bruce Duncan	15,751	74.8	−25.2
Labor	Frederick Braid	5,308	25.2	+25.2
Country hold		Swing	−25.2	

==== 1971 ====
1971 New South Wales state election: Lismore
Party	Candidate	Votes	%	±%
Country	Bruce Duncan	unopposed		
Country hold				

=== Elections in the 1960s ===
==== 1968 ====
1968 New South Wales state election: Lismore
Party	Candidate	Votes	%	±%
Country	Bruce Duncan	13,499	68.2	+36.4
Labor	Barrie Eggins	6,304	31.8	−14.0
Total formal votes		19,803	99.3	
Informal votes		136	0.7	
Turnout		19,939	95.9	
Country hold		Swing	+16.1	

==== 1965 ====
1965 New South Wales state election: Lismore
Party	Candidate	Votes	%	±%
Labor	Keith Compton	7,624	45.8	−9.7
Country	Bruce Duncan	5,305	31.8	−10.6
Country	Digby Wilson	2,323	13.9	+13.9
Liberal	Alan Henderson	1,406	8.4	+8.4
Total formal votes		16,658	98.9	−0.3
Informal votes		182	1.1	+0.3
Turnout		16,840	94.6	−0.5
Two-party-preferred result
Country	Bruce Duncan	8,685	52.1	+8.0
Labor	Keith Compton	7,973	47.9	−8.0
Country gain from Labor		Swing	+8.0	

==== 1962 ====
1962 New South Wales state election: Lismore
Party	Candidate	Votes	%	±%
Labor	Keith Compton	9,268	55.5	+55.5
Country	William Blair	7,087	42.4	−7.6
Democratic Labor	John Antill	344	2.1	+2.1
Total formal votes		16,699	99.2	
Informal votes		134	0.8	
Turnout		16,833	95.1	
Two-party-preferred result
Labor	Keith Compton	9,337	55.9	+55.9
Country	William Blair	7,362	44.1	−5.9
Labor gain from Country		Swing	N/A	

- The Country Party had won the 1959 election for Lismore by 2 votes, however it was declared void by the Court of Disputed Returns. The resulting by-election was won by Keith Compton (Labor).

=== Elections in the 1950s ===
==== 1959 by-election ====
1959 Lismore by-election Saturday 5 November
Party	Candidate	Votes	%	±%
Labor	Keith Compton	7,563	47.1	
Country	Jack Easter (defeated)	5,903	36.8	−13.2
Country	Clyde Campbell	2,575	16.1	−33.9
Total formal votes		16,041	99.4	+1.1
Informal votes		89	0.6	−1.1
Turnout		16,130	92.4	−0.7
Two-party-preferred result
Labor	Keith Compton	8,312	51.8	
Country	Jack Easter	7,729	48.2	−1.8
Labor gain from Country		Swing	N/A	

The 1959 Lismore election was declared void.

==== 1959 ====
1959 New South Wales state election: Lismore
Party	Candidate	Votes	%	±%
Country	Jack Easter	7,996	50.01	
Independent	Clyde Campbell	7,994	49.99	
Total formal votes		15,990	98.3	
Informal votes		273	1.7	
Turnout		16,263	93.1	
Country hold		Swing		

==== 1956 ====
1956 New South Wales state election: Lismore
Party	Candidate	Votes	%	±%
Country	Jack Easter	9,914	61.4	+25.5
Labor	Archibald McEwan	4,039	25.0	−9.3
Independent	Constance Wilson	2,190	13.6	+13.6
Total formal votes		16,143	99.3	+0.4
Informal votes		109	0.7	−0.4
Turnout		16,252	92.4	−2.5
Two-party-preferred result
Country	Jack Easter	11,009	68.2	+5.2
Labor	Archibald McEwan	5,134	31.8	−5.2
Country hold		Swing	+5.2	

==== 1953 ====
1953 New South Wales state election: Lismore
Party	Candidate	Votes	%	±%
Country	Jack Easter	5,775	35.9	
Labor	Donald Watson (mathematician)	5,520	34.3	
Country	William Frith	4,786	29.8	
Total formal votes		16,081	98.9	
Informal votes		185	1.1	
Turnout		16,266	94.9	
Two-party-preferred result
Country	Jack Easter	10,132	63.0	
Labor	Donald Watson (mathematician)	5,949	37.0	
Country hold		Swing		

==== 1950 ====
1950 New South Wales state election: Lismore
Party	Candidate	Votes	%	±%
Country	William Frith	10,631	70.4	
Labor	Francis Fredericks	4,467	29.6	
Total formal votes		15,098	97.6	
Informal votes		375	2.4	
Turnout		15,473	92.4	
Country hold		Swing		

=== Elections in the 1940s ===
==== 1947 ====
1947 New South Wales state election: Lismore
Party	Candidate	Votes	%	±%
Country	William Frith	9,628	62.9	+3.4
Independent	Frederick Stoker	5,686	37.1	+37.1
Total formal votes		15,314	98.5	+0.2
Informal votes		227	1.5	−0.2
Turnout		15,541	93.6	+4.3
Country hold		Swing	N/A	

==== 1944 ====
1944 New South Wales state election: Lismore
Party	Candidate	Votes	%	±%
Country	William Frith	8,025	59.5	+19.3
Lang Labor	Warren Oakes	5,469	40.5	+40.5
Total formal votes		13,494	98.3	−0.8
Informal votes		232	1.7	+0.8
Turnout		13,726	89.3	−4.2
Country hold		Swing	N/A	

==== 1941 ====
1941 New South Wales state election: Lismore
Party	Candidate	Votes	%	±%
Country	William Frith	5,728	40.2	
Labor	Jim Fredericks	4,439	31.1	
Independent	Edward Thorncroft	3,161	22.2	
Independent	David Harrison	925	6.5	
Total formal votes		14,253	99.1	
Informal votes		123	0.9	
Turnout		14,376	93.5	
Two-party-preferred result
Country	William Frith	8,764	61.5	
Labor	Jim Fredericks	5,489	38.5	
Country hold		Swing		

=== Elections in the 1930s ===
==== 1938 ====
1938 New South Wales state election: Lismore
Party	Candidate	Votes	%	±%
Country	William Frith	unopposed		
Country hold				

==== 1935 ====
1935 New South Wales state election: Lismore
Party	Candidate	Votes	%	±%
Country	William Frith	unopposed		
Country hold				

==== 1933 by-election ====
1933 Lismore by-election Saturday 11 March
Party	Candidate	Votes	%	±%
Country	William Frith	4,039	33.4	
Labor (NSW)	Jim Fredericks	3,634	30.1	+6.1
Country	Robert Gibson	2,456	20.3	
Country	Percy Tighe	931	7.7	
Independent	Phillip Wilkins	924	7.7	
Total formal votes		12,079	97.8	−1.2
Informal votes		277	2.2	+1.2
Turnout		12,356	90.6	−6.3
Two-party-preferred result
Country	William Frith	7,730	64.0	−12.0
Labor (NSW)	Jim Fredericks	4,349	36.0	+12.0
Country hold		Swing	−12.0	

William Missingham, Country died.

==== 1932 ====
1932 New South Wales state election: Lismore
Party	Candidate	Votes	%	±%
Country	William Missingham	9,823	76.0	+12.6
Labor (NSW)	Charles Taylor	3,093	24.0	−12.2
Total formal votes		12,916	99.0	+1.1
Informal votes		127	1.0	−1.1
Turnout		13,043	96.8	+1.6
Country hold		Swing	N/A	

==== 1930 ====
1930 New South Wales state election: Lismore
Party	Candidate	Votes	%	±%
Country	William Missingham	7,674	63.4	
Labor	Jim Fredericks	4,381	36.2	
Communist	William Harkin	42	0.4	
Total formal votes		12,097	97.9	
Informal votes		265	2.1	
Turnout		12,362	95.2	
Country hold		Swing		

=== Elections in the 1920s ===
==== 1927 ====
1927 New South Wales state election: Lismore
Party	Candidate	Votes	%	±%
Country	William Missingham	9,008	74.0	
Independent	George Boyd	3,157	26.0	
Total formal votes		12,165	99.1	
Informal votes		109	0.9	
Turnout		12,274	78.7	
Country win		(new seat)		

District re-created

==== 1920–1927 ====
District abolished

=== Elections in the 1910s ===
==== 1917 ====
1917 New South Wales state election: Lismore
Party	Candidate	Votes	%	±%
Nationalist	George Nesbitt	4,720	79.1	+8.3
Independent Labor	Michael O'Halloran	1,250	20.9	+20.9
Total formal votes		5,970	99.1	+1.2
Informal votes		52	0.9	−1.2
Turnout		6,022	53.3	−16.7
Nationalist hold		Swing	+8.3	

==== 1913 ====
1913 New South Wales state election: Lismore
Party	Candidate	Votes	%	±%
Farmers and Settlers	George Nesbitt (Note: Also endorsed by Liberal Reform.)	5,383	70.8	
Labor	Roger Kearney	2,218	29.2	
Total formal votes		7,601	97.9	
Informal votes		159	2.1	
Turnout		7,760	70.0	
Farmers and Settlers win		(new seat)		

District re-created

==== 1904–1913 ====
District abolished

=== Elections in the 1900s ===
==== 1901 ====
1901 New South Wales state election: Lismore
Party	Candidate	Votes	%	±%
Independent Liberal	John Coleman	824	48.0	
Independent Liberal	James O'Flynn	506	29.5	
Independent Liberal	Richard Balmer	277	16.1	
Independent Liberal	James Frith	62	3.6	
Independent Liberal	Frank Russell	25	1.5	
Labour	Robert Campbell	12	0.7	
Progressive	Charles Duffy	12	0.7	
Total formal votes		1,718	98.2	−1.5
Informal votes		32	1.8	+1.5
Turnout		1,750	68.0	+23.7
Independent Liberal gain from Progressive				

The sitting member was Thomas Ewing (Progressive) who did not contest the election as he had been elected in March 1901 to the federal seat of Richmond.

=== Elections in the 1890s ===
==== 1898 ====
1898 New South Wales colonial election: Lismore
Party	Candidate	Votes	%	±%
National Federal	Thomas Ewing	591	84.9	
Independent Federalist	James Walker	105	15.1	
Total formal votes		696	99.7	
Informal votes		2	0.3	
Turnout		698	44.3	
National Federal hold				

==== 1895 ====
1895 New South Wales colonial election: Lismore
Party	Candidate	Votes	%	±%
Protectionist	Thomas Ewing	unopposed		
Protectionist hold				

==== 1894 ====
1894 New South Wales colonial election: Lismore
Party	Candidate	Votes	%	±%
Protectionist	Thomas Ewing	718	76.4	
Independent Labour	James Walker	222	23.6	
Total formal votes		940	99.3	
Informal votes		7	0.7	
Turnout		947	69.6	
Protectionist win		(new seat)		
