= 1959 Lismore state by-election =

Election result for Lismore, New South Wales, Australia

A by-election was held for the New South Wales Legislative Assembly electorate of Lismore on 12 September 1959 because Justice Sugerman in the Court of Disputed Returns declared that the 1959 Lismore election was void. Electoral officers failed to initial or sign 51 ballot papers, rendering those papers informal. Those electors had been prevented from casting an effective vote and therefore preventing from voting. As Jack Easter's margin at the election was only 2 votes, the errors may have affected the result of the election.

== Dates ==
Date	Event
21 March 1959	New South Wales state election.
1 May 1959	Clyde Campbell filed a petition in the Court of Disputed returns.
12 June 1959	1959 Lismore election declared void.
18 August 1959	Writ of election issued by the Speaker of the Legislative Assembly.
21 August 1959	Nominations
12 September 1959	Polling day
9 October 1959	Return of writ

== Candidates ==
- Clyde Campbell, was an independent candidate at the 1959 election but was endorsed by the Country Party for the by-election
- Jack Easter was the sitting member and retained Country Party endorsement. He had been elected with 63% of the two-party-preferred result at the 1953 Lismore election, increasing to 68% at the 1956 Lismore election.
- Keith Compton was the Labor candidate. There had been no Labor candidate at the election in March.

== Result ==
1959 Lismore by-election
Party	Candidate	Votes	%	±%
Labor	Keith Compton	7,563	47.1	
Country	Jack Easter (defeated)	5,903	36.8	−13.2
Country	Clyde Campbell	2,575	16.1	−33.9
Total formal votes		16,041	99.4	+1.1
Informal votes		89	0.6	−1.1
Turnout		16,130	92.4	−0.7
Two-party-preferred result
Labor	Keith Compton	8,312	51.8	
Country	Jack Easter	7,729	48.2	−1.8
Labor gain from Country		Swing	N/A	

== See also ==
- Electoral results for the district of Lismore
- List of New South Wales state by-elections
