= 1973 Byron state by-election =

Election result for Byron, New South Wales, Australia

A by-election was held for the New South Wales Legislative Assembly electorate of Byron on 17 February 1973 because of the resignation of Stanley Stephens (Country).

== Dates ==
Date	Event
17 January 1973	Stanley Stephens resigned.
19 January 1973	Writ of election issued by the Speaker of the Legislative Assembly.
26 January 1973	Nominations
17 February 1973	Polling day
16 March 1973	Return of writ

== Result ==
1973 Byron by-election Saturday 17 February
Party	Candidate	Votes	%	±%
Country	Jack Boyd	6,397	35.9	
Labor	James Constable	7,535	42.3	−3.2
Country	Colville Vincent	3,584	20.1	
Australia	Clemens Vermeulen	314	1.8	
Total formal votes		17,830	98.7	+0.2
Informal votes		227	1.3	−0.2
Turnout		18,057	88.5	−3.5
Two-party-preferred result
Country	Jack Boyd	9,584	54.5	−0.8
Labor	James Constable	7,976	45.5	+0.8
Country hold		Swing	−0.8	

== See also ==
- Electoral results for the district of Byron
- List of New South Wales state by-elections
