= Electoral results for the district of Murwillumbah =

Election results for Murwillumbah, New South Wales, Australia

Murwillumbah, an electoral district of the Legislative Assembly in the Australian state of New South Wales was created in 1988 and abolished in 1999.

| Election | Member | Party |
|---|---|---|
| 1988 | Don Beck | National |
| 1991 | Don Beck | National |
| 1995 | Don Beck | National |

== Election results ==
=== Elections in the 1990s ===
==== 1995 ====
1995 New South Wales state election: Murwillumbah
| Party | Candidate | Votes | % | ±% |
|---|---|---|---|---|
| National | Don Beck | 14,701 | 41.2 | +4.3 |
| Labor | Trevor Wilson | 10,005 | 28.0 | −1.7 |
| Independent | Jade Hurley | 8,139 | 22.8 | +5.4 |
| Greens | Samuelle Leonard | 1,543 | 4.3 | +4.3 |
| Independent | John Diamond | 665 | 1.9 | +1.9 |
| Against Further Immigration | Ken Harradine | 359 | 1.0 | +1.0 |
| The Country Party | John Morrison | 213 | 0.6 | +0.6 |
| Independent | Ron Evans | 100 | 0.3 | +0.3 |
| Total formal votes | | 35,725 | 95.9 | +0.6 |
| Informal votes | | 1,511 | 4.1 | −0.6 |
| Turnout | | 37,236 | 92.8 | |
Two-party-preferred result
| National | Don Beck | 16,713 | 52.1 | −1.0 |
| Labor | Trevor Wilson | 15,394 | 47.9 | +1.0 |
| National hold | | Swing | −1.0 | |

==== 1991 ====
1991 New South Wales state election: Murwillumbah
| Party | Candidate | Votes | % | ±% |
|---|---|---|---|---|
| National | Don Beck | 11,196 | 36.8 | −19.1 |
| Labor | Trevor Wilson | 9,038 | 29.7 | −6.9 |
| Independent | John Hurley | 4,984 | 16.4 | +16.4 |
| Independent | Max Boyd | 4,431 | 14.6 | +14.6 |
| Democrats | Ken Nicholson | 772 | 2.5 | +2.5 |
| Total formal votes | | 30,421 | 95.3 | −2.4 |
| Informal votes | | 1,499 | 4.7 | +2.4 |
| Turnout | | 31,920 | 92.4 | |
Two-party-preferred result
| National | Don Beck | 14,937 | 53.1 | −6.5 |
| Labor | Trevor Wilson | 13,201 | 46.9 | +6.5 |
| National hold | | Swing | −6.5 | |

=== Elections in the 1980s ===
==== 1988 ====
1988 New South Wales state election: Murwillumbah
| Party | Candidate | Votes | % | ±% |
|---|---|---|---|---|
| National | Don Beck | 16,687 | 56.1 | +10.7 |
| Labor | James McCaughey | 10,847 | 36.5 | −6.6 |
| Independent | Angus Pearson | 2,220 | 7.5 | +7.5 |
| Total formal votes | | 29,754 | 97.7 | −0.5 |
| Informal votes | | 689 | 2.3 | +0.5 |
| Turnout | | 30,443 | 92.9 | |
Two-party-preferred result
| National | Don Beck | 17,648 | 60.1 | +9.9 |
| Labor | James McCaughey | 11,714 | 39.9 | −9.9 |
| National notional hold | | Swing | +9.9 | |
