= Arthur Budd =

Arthur Budd may refer to:

- Arthur Budd (rugby union) (1853–1899), English rugby union player
- Arthur Budd (politician) (1870–1957), Australian politician
- Arthur Budd (footballer) (1945–2012), Australian rules footballer
