= 1933 Lismore state by-election =

Election result for Lismore, New South Wales, Australia

A by-election was held for the New South Wales Legislative Assembly electorate of Lismore on 11 March 1933 because of the death of William Missingham, Country. William Frith of the National Party of Australia – NSW won the election with 33.4% of the vote.

== Dates ==
Date	Event
1 February 1933	William Missingham died.
14 February 1933	Writ of election issued by the Speaker of the Legislative Assembly.
21 February 1933	Day of nomination
11 March 1933	Polling day
25 March 1933	Return of writ

== Result ==
1933 Lismore by-election Saturday 11 March
Party	Candidate	Votes	%	±%
Country	William Frith	4,039	33.4	
Labor (NSW)	Jim Fredericks	3,634	30.1	+6.1
Country	Robert Gibson	2,456	20.3	
Country	Percy Tighe	931	7.7	
Independent	Phillip Wilkins	924	7.7	
Total formal votes		12,079	97.8	−1.2
Informal votes		277	2.2	+1.2
Turnout		12,356	90.6	−6.3
Two-party-preferred result
Country	William Frith	7,730	64.0	−12.0
Labor (NSW)	Jim Fredericks	4,349	36.0	+12.0
Country hold		Swing	−12.0	

== See also ==
- Electoral results for the district of Lismore
- List of New South Wales state by-elections
