= Janelle Saffin =

Australian politician (born 1954)

The Honourable Janelle Saffin MP
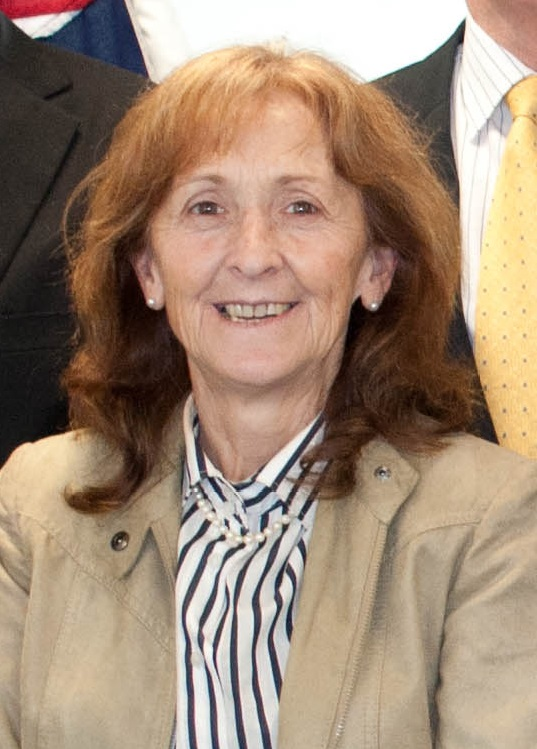

Minister for Recovery
- Incumbent
- Assumed office 17 March 2025
- Preceded by: Steph Cooke (Note: Ministry not in use from 2023 to 2025 and was previously titled Minister for Flood Recovery.)

Minister for Small Business
- Incumbent
- Assumed office 17 March 2025
- Preceded by: Steve Kamper

Minister for the North Coast
- Incumbent
- Assumed office 17 March 2025
- Preceded by: Rose Jackson

Member of the New South Wales Legislative Assembly for Lismore
- Incumbent
- Assumed office 23 March 2019
- Preceded by: Thomas George

Member of the Australian Parliament for Page
- In office 24 November 2007 – 7 September 2013
- Preceded by: Ian Causley
- Succeeded by: Kevin Hogan

Member of the New South Wales Legislative Council
- In office 25 March 1995 – 28 February 2003

Personal details
- Born: 1 November 1954 (age 72) Ipswich, Queensland
- Party: Labor
- Profession: Teacher, lawyer
- Website: janellesaffin.com.au

Janelle Anne Saffin (born 1 November 1954) is an Australian politician and a member of the Labor Party. She has been the Member for Lismore in the New South Wales Legislative Assembly since 23 March 2019. She was the Member for Page in the Australian House of Representatives from 2007 to 2013, and a Member of the New South Wales Legislative Council from 1995 to 2003.

== Early life ==
Saffin was born into a working-class family in Ipswich in Queensland. She left school at thirteen, and worked in a range of unskilled jobs before gaining her Intermediate Certificate at TAFE. She moved to Lismore at the age of 24, and began working as the co-ordinator of a women's refuge. She also established a domestic violence liaison committee with the local police, which was the first of its kind outside Sydney. She later gained a teaching qualification at the Northern Rivers College of Advanced Education, and taught for a period before deciding to retrain as a lawyer and gaining a degree by correspondence from Macquarie University.

== Political career ==
Saffin ran as the Labor candidate for the seat of Lismore at the 1991 state election, but was defeated by incumbent National Party MP Bill Rixon. Four years later, she contested and won preselection for the eighth and last winnable position on the Labor ticket for the Legislative Council at the 1995 state election. Labor's victory at the election thus saw her comfortably elected, albeit on preferences.

Saffin is associated with the Socialist Left faction of the party and is involved in advocating for progressive causes both inside and outside of parliament. She took a particular interest in the fate of East Timor and Burma, and was an official observer for the International Commission of Jurists at the 1999 independence referendum in East Timor. She is actively involved in feminist causes, and was one of only two Australian representatives at the Global Forum of Women Political Leaders in Manila in 2000. She also worked as an anti-nuclear campaigner, being involved in the campaigns against French nuclear testing in the Pacific and uranium mining at Jabiluka. She attempted to gain Labor preselection for a second term before the 2003 state election, but was unsuccessful in gaining a winnable position on Labor's ticket and subsequently was not re-elected.

Saffin had met East Timorese foreign minister José Ramos-Horta a number of times as an MP, and in 2004, having left politics, she moved to East Timor to take up a position as Ramos-Horta's chief political and legal advisor. She served in the role for three years assisting in the rebuilding of the country, staying with Ramos-Horta through his election first to Prime Minister and then President in 2007. She resigned in early 2007, choosing to return to Australia for family reasons and contest preselection for the National Party held federal seat of Page, based around her home town of Lismore. She faced a difficult preselection contest against local mayor Ian Tiley, but emerged successful.

Saffin then faced a difficult contest in the general election against new National Party candidate Chris Gulaptis, with previous member Ian Causley having decided to retire at the election. Causley had held the seat with a 5.5-point margin, which saw the possibility of victory initially considered unlikely. However, as Labor continued to poll well in the seat, they began to supply more resources to the campaign, with the party's assistant secretary declaring Page to be a "target seat" in September. Saffin campaigned heavily on industrial relations, health and housing affordability, and received a 2PP swing of 7.8 points, defeating the Nationals candidate. This resulted in Page being one of the first seats nationally to be declared on election night. Saffin was re-elected at the 2010 federal election with a further 1.8-point swing, against the national trend.

On 21 March 2013 Saffin resigned as Government Whip after an attempt to replace Prime Minister Julia Gillard with the previous Prime Minister Kevin Rudd failed. The attempt foundered when Rudd unexpectedly announced that he would not contest the position. Saffin had indicated support for Rudd.

Saffin was defeated at the 2013 election by Nationals candidate Kevin Hogan in a rematch of the 2010 election.

At a TAFE rally on 23 September 2015, with Labor's Shadow Minister for Vocational Education, Sharon Bird, Saffin announced that she would again contest the federal seat of Page at the 2016 election. Despite achieving a small swing in her favour, Saffin was defeated by Kevin Hogan in their third consecutive election against each other.

On 22 April 2018 Saffin won pre-selection to contest the NSW State seat of Lismore, which she won on 23 March 2019. This was one of just two seats Labor won off the Coalition in the election and represented the first time Labor had won the Lismore electorate since 1962. In doing so, Saffin became the first woman to represent the seat.

Saffin received prominent media coverage during the 2022 Lismore floods, both for her support of residents stranded by the flood and where she was forced to swim through flood waters herself after being trapped by rising water at a friend's home.

Saffin won re-election at the 2023 New South Wales state election increasing her primary vote by over 19 points and delivering a 2PP swing of over 12 points in her favour, one of the largest swings in the state.

In 2025, Saffin was sworn in as Minister for Recovery, Minister for Small Business, and Minister for the North Coast.

Saffin has confirmed that she will again contest the division of Lismore at the 2027 New South Wales election.

== Notes ==
Parliament of Australia
Preceded by Ian Causley	Member for Page; 2007–2013	Succeeded by Kevin Hogan
New South Wales Legislative Assembly
Preceded by Thomas George	Member for Lismore; 2019–present	Succeeded by Incumbent
