= Jack Easter =

Australian politician

Member of the New South Wales Legislative Assembly
- In office 14 February 1953 – 12 June 1959
- Preceded by: William Frith
- Succeeded by: Keith Compton
- Constituency: Lismore

Personal details
- Born: 27 November 1907 London
- Died: 1 January 1979 (aged 71)
- Party: Australian Country Party (N.S.W.)
- Spouse: Margery Joan Thomas m. 1932

Jack Stuart Easter (21 November 1907 – 1 January 1979) was an Australian politician who represented the National Party in the Parliament of New South Wales.

He was educated at Ardingly College and at Regent Street Polytechnic. He was a company director who during his career served as alderman and mayor of Ballina, and also served as Chairman of Richmond River County Council, and delegate to Northern Rivers County Council and to Far North Coast Weeds Council.

He served as an Australian Country Party (N.S.W.) member for Lismore in the New South Wales Legislative Assembly between 1953 and 1959. After being re-elected at the 1959 New South Wales state election by a margin of two votes, Easter's win was disputed in the Court of Disputed Returns where the election was pronounced void, leading to a subsequent by-election. He lost the by-election to the Labor Party's Keith Compton after the Australian Country Party endorsed a second candidate.

New South Wales Legislative Assembly
Preceded by William Frith	Member for Lismore; 1953–1959	Succeeded by Keith Compton
