= Thomas George (Australian politician) =

Australian politician

4th Deputy Speaker of the Legislative Assembly
- In office 3 May 2011 – 1 March 2019
- Speaker: Shelley Hancock
- Preceded by: Tanya Gadiel
- Succeeded by: Leslie Williams

Member of the New South Wales Legislative Assembly for Lismore
- In office 27 March 1999 – 1 March 2019
- Preceded by: Bill Rixon
- Succeeded by: Janelle Saffin

Personal details
- Born: 15 January 1949 (age 77) Casino, New South Wales, Australia
- Party: The Nationals

Thomas George (born 15 January 1949) is an Australian politician who was a member of the New South Wales Legislative Assembly from 1999 to 2019. He was educated at St Mary's Primary and Marist Brothers College in Casino. He has worked as a bank officer, a stock and station agent, a real estate agent and a publican. He is married to Deborah.

Elected to the seat of Lismore in 1999, Thomas George had been a longtime supporter of the Nationals, becoming a member in 1969. Besides being the NSW National Party Whip in the O'Farrell/ Stoner Liberal/ The Nationals Opposition, George was also Temporary Speaker of the Legislative Assembly.

His foundations for helping out the community began when he was the inaugural chairman of the Casino Beef Week Promotion Committee from 1982 to 1990. He was rewarded with the Casino Apex Citizen of the Year and the Casino Council's Australia Day Award. George was president of the Casino Chamber of Commerce and Industry from 1997 until 1998, and a representative on the Northern Rivers Area Consultative Committee from 1995 until 1997. He then became director of the Northern Regional Westpac Life Saver Rescue Helicopter from 1994 until 1999.

George has been a member of The Nationals Agricultural and Small Business Committees, the Coalition Advisory Social Development Committee while on the back bench. He was president of the NSW Parliamentary Lions Club. He has been a spokesperson on rural crime and energy, and ports, and was the deputy whip in 2002 before being appointed as the party whip in 2003. In June 2017, George announced his intention to retire from politics at the next state election in 2019.

== Notes ==
New South Wales Legislative Assembly
Preceded by Bill Rixon	Member for Lismore; 1999–2019	Succeeded by Janelle Saffin
Preceded by Tanya Gadiel	Deputy Speaker of the Legislative Assembly; 2011–2019	Succeeded by Leslie Williams
