= Electoral district of Lismore =

State electoral district of New South Wales, Australia

Lismore New South Wales—Legislative Assembly
- Interactive map of district boundaries from the 2023 state election
- State: New South Wales
- Dates current: 1894–1904; 1913–1920; 1927–present
- MP: Janelle Saffin
- Party: Labor
- Namesake: Lismore, New South Wales
- Electors: 57,384 (2023)
- Area: 13,020.61 km^{2} (5,027.3 sq mi)
- Demographic: Rural and provincial
Electorates around Lismore:
Queensland	Queensland	Tweed
Queensland	Lismore	Ballina
Northern Tablelands	Clarence	Ballina

Lismore is an electoral district of the Legislative Assembly of the Australian state of New South Wales. It has been represented by Janelle Saffin of the Labor Party since 2019.

The district is on the Queensland border in the state's northeast and includes all of the City of Lismore (including Lismore, Lindendale, Nimbin, Dunoon and Clunes), much of inland Tweed Shire (including Murwillumbah, Tyalgum and Uki), all of Kyogle Council (including Kyogle, Bonalbo, Tabulam and Woodenbong) and all of Tenterfield Shire (including Tenterfield, Drake, Jennings, Liston, Legume, Torrington and Urbenville).

== History ==
Lismore was first created with the end of multi-member districts in 1894, when it was split from Richmond. In 1904, it was abolished with the reduction in the size of the Legislative Assembly, after Federation. In 1913, Lismore was recreated, replacing Richmond. With the introduction of proportional representation in 1920, Lismore and Clarence were absorbed into Byron. With the end of proportional representation in 1927, Lismore and Clarence were recreated.

Historically a Country Party/National Party seat, Lismore has only been represented by two Labor MPs: Keith Compton, who was elected at a by-election in 1959 and re-elected in 1962, and Janelle Saffin, who was elected in 2019 who is also the first woman to represent the division.

== Members for Lismore ==
First incarnation (1894–1904)
Member	Party	Term
Thomas Ewing	Protectionist	1894–1901
John Coleman	Independent Liberal	1901–1904
Second incarnation (1913–1920)
Member	Party	Term
George Nesbitt	Liberal Reform	1913–1917
George Nesbitt	Nationalist	1917–1920
Third incarnation (1927–present)
Member	Party	Term
William Missingham	Country	1927–1933
William Frith	Country	1933–1953
Jack Easter	Country	1953–1959
Keith Compton	Labor	1959–1965
Bruce Duncan	Country	1965–1975
Bruce Duncan	National Country	1975–1982
Bruce Duncan	National	1982–1982
Bruce Duncan	Independent	1982–1988
Bill Rixon	National	1988–1999
Thomas George	National	1999–2019
Janelle Saffin	Labor	2019–present

== Election results ==
2023 New South Wales state election: Lismore
Party	Candidate	Votes	%	±%
Labor	Janelle Saffin	21,615	44.4	+19.0
National	Alex Rubin	13,581	27.9	−11.2
Greens	Adam Guise	6,979	14.3	−10.8
Shooters, Fishers, Farmers	Matthew Bertalli	3,347	6.9	+6.9
Animal Justice	Vanessa Rosayro	1,196	2.5	0.0
Independent	James McKenzie	791	1.6	+1.6
Sustainable Australia	Ross Honniball	666	1.4	−0.2
Independent	Allen Crosthwaite	511	1.0	+1.0
Total formal votes		48,686	97.4	+0.4
Informal votes		1,312	2.6	−0.4
Turnout		49,998	87.1	−1.1
Two-party-preferred result
Labor	Janelle Saffin	28,163	65.0	+13.0
National	Alex Rubin	15,172	35.0	−13.0
Labor hold		Swing	+13.0	
