= Frederick Stuart (Australian politician) =

Australian politician

Frederick William Stuart (1879 – 18 February 1954) was an Australian politician.

He was born on the Hunter River to farmer Frederick Stuart and Janet, née Graham. He attended primary school before serving in the Boer War with the New South Wales Lancers and then the Mounted Rifles. After the war he spent some time in the Orange Free State, running a business there before returning to Australia in 1905, settling in Murwillumbah in 1909. He married Marjorie Phillips in South Australia, with whom he had five children. He ran an office for Hindmarsh, Johnson and Co., an auctioneering firm he eventually took over (it became F. W. Stuart and Co.). From 1925 to 1927 he was a Progressive member of the New South Wales Legislative Assembly for Byron. Stuart died at Murwillumbah in 1954.

New South Wales Legislative Assembly
Preceded by George Nesbitt; Stephen Perdriau	Member for Byron; 1925–1927; Served alongside: Gillies, Missingham	Succeeded by Arthur Budd
