= William Frith (politician) =

Australian politician (1883–1960)

Personal details
- Born: 11 June 1883 St Leonards, New South Wales
- Died: 14 June 1960 (aged 77) Neutral Bay, New South Wales
- Party: Country Party

William Frith (11 June 1883 – 14 June 1960) was an Australian politician. He was a member of the New South Wales Legislative Assembly from 1933 until 1953. He was a member of the Country Party. He was the party whip from 1938 till 1953.

Frith was born in St Leonards, New South Wales. He was the son of a monumental mason and was educated to elementary level at Boolaroo Public School. He worked as a farmer and auctioneer in the Lismore, New South Wales region. Between 1928 and 1933 he was an alderman on Lismore City Council and he served as Mayor in 1932 and 1933. Frith was elected to the New South Wales Parliament as the Country Party member for Lismore at the by-election caused by the death of the sitting member William Missingham. He retained the seat at the next 6 elections. By the time of the 1953 election, Frith had reached the age of 70 and under Country Party rules multiple endorsements for the seat were permissible. He was defeated by his younger colleague Jack Easter.

New South Wales Legislative Assembly
Preceded by William Missingham	Member for Lismore; 1933 – 1953	Succeeded by Jack Easter
