= Tom Swiney =

Australian politician

Personal details
- Born: 1 January 1875 Balranald, New South Wales
- Died: 15 October 1945 (aged 70) Lidcombe, New South Wales
- Party: Labor Party

Thomas James Swiney (1 January 1875 – 15 October 1945) was an Australian politician. He was a member of the New South Wales Legislative Assembly for one term from 1920 until 1922. He was a member of the Labor Party (ALP).

Swiney was born in Balranald, New South Wales and worked as a farmer. At the 1920 election, he was the first candidate on the ALP list and won the third and last position in the multi-member seat of Byron. Swiney was defeated at the 1922 election by 223 votes. He later held positions with the Aboriginal Protection Board. He did not hold ministerial or party office.

New South Wales Legislative Assembly
Preceded by John Perry	Member for Byron; 1920 – 1922; Served alongside: Nesbitt, Perdriau	Succeeded by William Missingham
