= Robert Gillies (Australian politician) =

Australian politician (1876–1941)

Robert Towers Gillies (1876 – 26 July 1941) was an Australian politician.

== Early life ==
He was born on the Paterson River to farmers Dugald and Mary Gillies. He attended public school at Pimlico and worked as a blacksmith.

== Career ==
He farmed at Cudgera from around 1908, before relocating to Tweed Heads around 1922, where he became a contributor to the Tweed Daily and a councillor from 1922 to 1925. In 1925 he was elected to the New South Wales Legislative Assembly as one of the Labor members for Byron, but he was expelled in 1927 for his opposition to Jack Lang. He later joined the right-wing All for Australia League.

After leaving politics he became a commercial agent in Fairfield and then at Lismore before returning to Tweed Heads around 1935. Gillies died at Tweed Heads in 1941.

== Personal life ==
Around 1903, he married Mabel Elsie McKeever, with whom he had six children.

New South Wales Legislative Assembly
Preceded by George Nesbitt; Stephen Perdriau	Member for Byron; 1925–1927; Served alongside: Missingham, Stuart	Succeeded by Arthur Budd
