= Arthur Budd (footballer) =

Australian rules footballer

Personal information
- Full name: Arthur Budd
- Born: 27 December 1945
- Died: 7 April 2012 (aged 66)
- Original team: Clarence
- Height: 185 cm (6 ft 1 in)
- Weight: 85 kg (187 lb)

Playing career^{1}
| Years | Club | Games (Goals) |
| 1969 | South Melbourne | 7 (2) |
- ^{1} Playing statistics correct to the end of 1969.

Arthur Budd (27 December 1945 – 7 April 2012) was an Australian rules footballer who played for the South Melbourne Football Club in the Victorian Football League (VFL).
