= Bruce Duncan =

Australian politician

Robert Bruce Duncan (10 October 1928 – 7 May 2005) was an Australian politician. He was the member for Lismore in the New South Wales Legislative Assembly from 1965 to 1988, first as a member of the Country Party and then as an independent.

Duncan was born in Lismore to farmer Robert Duncan and his wife Mary Mustard. He was educated at public schools in the Lismore area and became a dairy farmer at Konorigan. On 21 August 1953 he married Marlene Brown, with whom he had two sons.

In 1965, Duncan was preselected as one of two Country Party candidates for the marginal Labor seat of Lismore, held by Keith Compton. The Liberal Party also endorsed a candidate, making the seat a three-cornered contest. In the event, Duncan easily led the non-Labor candidates and was able to defeat Compton on the other candidates' preferences. Duncan established a strong electoral record, making Lismore a safe seat in 1968 and being elected unopposed in 1971. He continued to hold the seat with large margins over the following years. In 1982, the National Country Party, as it had become, changed its name to the National Party. Duncan objected to the exclusion of the word "Country" from the party's name, and resigned. The National Party, however, did not oppose his election in 1984 and he won his seat easily as an independent. Duncan retired in 1988, when the seat went back to the National Party.

Duncan died in Sydney in 2005.

New South Wales Legislative Assembly
Preceded by Keith Compton	Member for Lismore; 1965–1988	Succeeded by Bill Rixon
