= Electoral district of Murwillumbah =

Former state electoral district of New South Wales, Australia

Murwillumbah was an electoral district of the Legislative Assembly in the Australian state of New South Wales from 1988 to 1999, which included the town of Murwillumbah.

Murwillumbah replaced Byron and its only member was Donald Frederick Beck, a member of the National Party. Murwillumbah was replaced by Tweed.

== Members for Murwillumbah ==
Member	Party	Term
Don Beck	National	1988–1999

== Election results ==
1995 New South Wales state election: Murwillumbah
Party	Candidate	Votes	%	±%
National	Don Beck	14,701	41.2	+4.3
Labor	Trevor Wilson	10,005	28.0	−1.7
Independent	Jade Hurley	8,139	22.8	+5.4
Greens	Samuelle Leonard	1,543	4.3	+4.3
Independent	John Diamond	665	1.9	+1.9
Against Further Immigration	Ken Harradine	359	1.0	+1.0
The Country Party	John Morrison	213	0.6	+0.6
Independent	Ron Evans	100	0.3	+0.3
Total formal votes		35,725	95.9	+0.6
Informal votes		1,511	4.1	−0.6
Turnout		37,236	92.8	
Two-party-preferred result
National	Don Beck	16,713	52.1	−1.0
Labor	Trevor Wilson	15,394	47.9	+1.0
National hold		Swing	−1.0	
