= Stephen Perdriau =

Australian politician

Raymond Stephen Perdriau (3 December 1886 – 25 December 1951) was an Australian politician.

He was born at Waverley in Sydney to surveyor Stephen Edward Perdriau and Grace Marion, née King. After attending Scots College and Sydney Grammar School he was employed by Dalgety's Ltd and then began farming on the Tweed River. During World War I he served in the Australian Imperial Force's 3rd Artillery Division and was wounded and invalided at the Battle of Passchendaele; he attained the rank of corporal. On 5 November 1916 he married Isabella Aitchison in London, with whom he had a daughter. He was elected to the New South Wales Legislative Assembly in 1920 as one of the members for Byron, a member of the Progressive Party. He served as Minister for Business Undertaking for one day, 20 December 1921. A coalitionist Progressive who had joined the Nationalist Party by 1922, Perdriau was defeated in 1925. On 29 August 1939 he married Myrtle May Webb, with whom he had four more children. He died at Kyogle in 1951.

New South Wales Legislative Assembly
Preceded by John Perry	Member for Byron; 1920–1925; Served alongside: Nesbitt, Swiney/Missingham	Succeeded by Robert Gillies; Frederick Stuart
