= Don Beck (politician) =

Australian politician

Donald Frederick Charles Beck (21 March 1936 – 21 April 2024) was an Australian politician. He was a member of the New South Wales Legislative Assembly from 1984 until 1999. He was a member of The Nationals.

Beck was born in Toowoomba. He worked as a refrigeration and electrical contractor in rural Queensland until settling in the Tweed River area in the early 1960s. He served two terms on the Tweed Shire Council prior to winning National Party pre-selection for the seat of Byron before the general election of 1984. He subsequently won the seat replacing the previous member, Jack Boyd. The seat was abolished prior to the 1988 election and Beck was then elected the member for Murwillumbah. He held this seat until it was abolished in 1999. Beck then contested Tweed, which was basically a reconfigured version of his old seat. However, he was defeated by Labor's Neville Newell.

He was a National Serviceman in 1955 and subsequently a member of the Citizens Military Forces.

New South Wales Legislative Assembly
| Preceded by Jack Boyd | Member for Byron; 1984–1988 | Succeeded by Abolished |
| Preceded by New seat | Member for Murwillumbah; 1988–1999 | Succeeded by Abolished |
