= George Nesbitt =

Australian politician

George Nesbitt (1859 – 13 December 1948) was an Irish-born Australian politician.

He was born at Castlederg in County Tyrone to John Nesbitt, a Master in Poor Law, and Rebecca, née Gregory. He arrived in New South Wales in 1885 and worked for a Sydney softgoods firm as a traveller to the North Coast from 1887 to 1895. In 1895, he settled in Lismore and opened a general store; also, in that year he married Adina Morgan. He was active in various retailers' and commercial travellers' associations throughout the 1890s and 1900s and was an alderman and mayor at Lismore from 1906 to 1907. In 1913, he was elected to the New South Wales Legislative Assembly as the Liberal member for Lismore; with the introduction of proportional representation he became one of the members for Byron. He left the Assembly in 1925 but in 1927 was appointed to the New South Wales Legislative Council, serving until 1940. Nesbitt died at Cremorne in 1948.

New South Wales Legislative Assembly
Preceded by New seat	Member for Lismore; 1913–1920	Succeeded by Seat abolished
Preceded by John Perry	Member for Byron; 1920–1925; Served alongside: Perdriau, Swiney/Missingham	Succeeded by Robert Gillies; Frederick Stuart
