= Jack Boyd =

Australian politician

Personal details
- Born: 3 December 1921 Murwillumbah, New South Wales
- Died: 3 March 1985 (aged 63) Murwillumbah
- Party: National Party

John Charles (Jack) Boyd (3 December 1921 – 3 March 1985) was an Australian politician and member of the New South Wales Legislative Assembly from 1973 until 1984. He was a member of the Country Party and its successors.

== Biography ==
Boyd was born in Murwillumbah, New South Wales. He was educated at Murwillumbah High School and became a sugarcane grower and agriculturist. He was active in a number of farming groups including the Banana Growers Federation and the New South Wales Council of Canegrowers.

In 1940 Boyd joined the 2nd Australian Imperial Forces and saw service at Tobruk, where he was wounded. He was commissioned in 1943. Following his war service he continued to serve in the army reserve and eventually reached the rank of Lieutenant-Colonel. Boyd was elected to the New South Wales Parliament for the seat of Byron at a by-election caused be the resignation of Stanley Stephens. He retained the seat until his retirement at the 1984 state election. He did not hold ministerial or party office.

New South Wales Legislative Assembly
Preceded by Stanley Stephens	Member for Byron; 1973 – 1984	Succeeded by Don Beck
