= Keith Compton =

Australian politician

Keith Clive Compton (16 May 1900 – 6 December 1977) was an Australian politician. He was a Labor Party member of the New South Wales Legislative Assembly from 1959 to 1965, representing the electorate of Lismore.

Compton was born in Maitland and attended West Maitland High School. He trained as an engineer, working as an assistant engineer for the Shire of Kyogle from 1925 to 1930, before taking a position as shire engineer for the Lismore-based Shire of Gundurimba, which he would hold until his election to parliament in 1959. He served as the director of the Lismore Base Hospital during the 1950s, and was a member of the board of the Lismore Technical College. He was involved in local politics, serving as a local councillor for a period around 1939, joining the Labor Party in 1940, and being an unsuccessful Labor candidate at the 1946 election.

In 1959, the state electorate of Lismore was considered highly safe for the conservative Country Party, and Labor had not contested the seat at the 1959 election. A bitter battle between an independent and endorsed Country Party candidate saw the endorsed candidate, Jack Easter, win by two votes, and the Court of Disputed Returns overturned the result and called a new election in the seat. Labor endorsed Compton for the by-election and directed a large amount of resources into the campaign, and amidst significant Country Party infighting, won the seat in a landslide.

Compton was appointed to the ministry as Minister for Lands in 1961, and oversaw large amounts of infrastructure construction in the Lismore area, including new schools and a new hospital. He was easily re-elected in 1962, but faced a much more significant challenge in 1965. High unemployment and a struggling local economy saw growing disillusionment with Labor, and he was defeated by Country Party candidate Bruce Duncan, who subsequently held the seat for 23 years with little difficulty.

Compton resigned from the Labor Party in 1966. He died in 1977 at Lismore, and is buried in the Lismore Cemetery.

New South Wales Legislative Assembly
Preceded by Jack Easter	Member for Lismore; 1959 – 1965	Succeeded by Bruce Duncan
