= Electoral district of Byron =

State electoral district of New South Wales, Australia

Byron was an electoral district of the Legislative Assembly in the Australian state of New South Wales created in 1913, replacing Rous, and named after Cape Byron. With the introduction of proportional representation in 1920, Byron absorbed Lismore and Clarence and elected three members. With the end of proportional representation in 1927, it was redivided into the single-member electorates of Byron, Lismore and Clarence. In 1988, Byron was replaced by Ballina and Murwillumbah.

== Members for Byron ==
Single-member (1913–1920)
Member	Party	Term						
John Perry	Liberal Reform	1913–1917						
John Perry	Nationalist	1917–1920						
Three members (1920–1927)
Member	Party	Term	Member	Party	Term	Member	Party	Term
Tom Swiney	Labor	1920–1922	George Nesbitt	Nationalist	1920–1925	Stephen Perdriau	Progressive	1920–1922
William Missingham	Progressive	1922–1927	George Nesbitt	Nationalist	1920–1925	Stephen Perdriau	Nationalist	1922–1925
William Missingham	Progressive	1922–1927	Robert Gillies	Labor	1925–1927	Frederick Stuart	Progressive	1925–1927
Single-member (1927—1988)
Member	Party	Term						
Arthur Budd	Country	1927–1944						
Stanley Stephens	Country	1944–1973						
Jack Boyd	Country	1973–1984						
Don Beck	National	1984–1988						

== Election results ==
1984 New South Wales state election: Byron
Party	Candidate	Votes	%	±%
National	Don Beck	15,860	45.4	−6.8
Labor	Lyle Robb	14,586	41.8	−2.1
Independent	Alan Mountain	1,704	4.9	+4.9
Democrats	Kenneth Nicholson	1,631	4.7	+0.8
Independent	James Mangleson	1,133	3.2	+3.2
Total formal votes		34,914	98.1	+0.7
Informal votes		658	1.9	−0.7
Turnout		35,572	89.5	−0.7
Two-party-preferred result
National	Don Beck	17,431	50.8	−3.5
Labor	Lyle Robb	16,850	49.2	+3.5
National hold		Swing	−3.5	
