= Stanley Stephens (Australian politician) =

Australian politician

Stanley Stephens OBE

Member of the New South Wales Legislative Assembly for Byron
- In office 1944–1973
- Preceded by: Arthur Budd
- Succeeded by: Jack Boyd

Stanley Tunstall "Stepper" Stephens OBE (13 February 1913 – 23 March 1986) was an Australian politician. He was a Country Party member of the New South Wales Legislative Assembly from 1944 to 1973, representing the electorate of Byron. He served as Minister for Housing and Minister for Co-operative Societies in the Askin Coalition government.

Stephens was born in Blayney, and was educated at Fort Street High School and Murwillumbah High School. He became a journalist, and served as editor of the Mullumbimby Star from 1932 to 1939. He enlisted in the army at the beginning of World War II, and saw action at Tobruk, before being severely wounded in the Battle of El Alamein. Initially left for dead, he managed to survive, but lost the sight in one eye and suffered impaired vision in the other. He returned to Australia, underwent rehabilitation, and returned to working as a journalist.

Stephens nominated as a Country Party candidate for the seat of Byron at the 1944 state election, and was easily elected. He was re-elected nine times, running unopposed in 1950, 1953 and 1959. He served as Country Party whip from 1953 until the election of the Askin government, when he was appointed to the ministry as Minister for Housing and Minister for Co-operative Societies. While the relevant minister, he was responsible for the passage of the Credit Union Act 1969, pioneering legislation overseeing the introduction of credit unions.

Stephens resigned in the middle of his tenth term in 1973, and the subsequent by-election was won by Country Party candidate Jack Boyd. He was made an Officer of the Order of the British Empire (OBE) in 1976, and died in the Sydney suburb of Lindfield in 1986.

New South Wales Legislative Assembly
Preceded by Arthur Budd	Member for Byron; 1944–1973	Succeeded by Jack Boyd
