= Bill Rixon =

Australian politician

Barry William Rixon (22 February 1941 – 12 November 2003) was an Australian politician, elected as a member of the New South Wales Legislative Assembly.

Rixon was born and died in Kyogle, New South Wales. He was educated at Upper Eden Creek Primary School, Lismore High School, Armidale Teacher's College and the University of New England. He was a teacher at Milvale, Glen Innes, Tenterfield and Kyogle from 1960 to 1987. He married Merrilyn and they had two daughters, Serenity and Laura and four sons, Ben, Victor, Luke and Jordan.

Rixon was a councillor on Kyogle Council from 1977 to 1983 and president of it from 1977 to 1980. He was a The Nationals member for Lismore from 1988 to 1999.

New South Wales Legislative Assembly
Preceded by Bruce Duncan	Member for Lismore; 1988 – 1999	Succeeded by Thomas George
