= Arthur Budd (politician) =

Australian politician

Arthur Eames Budd (25 September 1870 – 28 November 1957) was an Australian politician.

Born at Ipswich in Queensland to farmer John Budd and Sarah Naish, née Eames, he was educated privately before becoming a railway worker and road contractor, moving to Murwillumbah in New South Wales in 1891 to become a farmer. On 14 August 1895 he married Annie Knight, with whom he had ten children. Budd served on Murwillumbah Municipal Council from 1904 to 1908 and from 1920 to 1927, with a period as mayor from 1922 to 1927. He was managing director of Budd's Farm Supplies until 1927 and had been a foundation member of the Tweed River Agricultural Society in 1910. From 1921 to 1927 he was the Murwillumbah district Coroner.

In 1927, Budd was elected to the New South Wales Legislative Assembly as the Country Party member for Byron. He served until his retirement in 1944. On 8 January 1935 he remarried Ida Swinney. One of his sons from his first marriage, Sir Harry Budd, served as a member of the New South Wales Legislative Council from 1946 to 1978. Arthur Budd died at Murwillumbah in 1957 and was cremated in Brisbane.

New South Wales Legislative Assembly
Preceded by Robert Gillies; William Missingham; Frederick Stuart	Member for Byron; 1927–1944	Succeeded by Stanley Stephens
