= Court of Disputed Returns (New South Wales) =

Special electoral jurisdiction of the Supreme Court of New South Wales, Australia

New South Wales Court of Disputed Returns
- Interactive map of New South Wales Court of Disputed Returns
- 33°52′08″S 151°12′42″E
- Established: 1928
- Jurisdiction: New South Wales, Australia
- Location: Sydney
- Coordinates: 33°52′08″S 151°12′42″E
- Composition method: Judges of the Supreme Court (NSW)
- Authorised by: Electoral Act 2017 (NSW)
- Appeals to: No appeal; decisions are final
- Website: supremecourt.justice.nsw.gov.au

Chief Justice of New South Wales
- Currently: Justice Tom Bathurst AC
- Since: 1 June 2011

The Court of Disputed Returns in New South Wales is a court within the Australian court hierarchy established initially in 1928 pursuant to the Parliamentary Electorates and Elections Amendment Act, and since 2017 pursuant to the Electoral Act 2017. The jurisdiction of the Court is exercised by the Supreme Court of New South Wales and the Court considers petitions concerning the validity of any election or return under the Act. The Court is concerned with elections held for the New South Wales Parliament and local government elections within the state.

The Court may also consider questions respecting the qualifications of a member of the Legislative Assembly or the Legislative Council, or respecting a vacancy in either, but only if that question was referred by either the Assembly or the Council. The Court may declare that any person was not qualified to be a member of parliament, declare that any person was not capable of sitting as a member of parliament, or to declare that there is a vacancy.

== The petition ==
The petition may be filed by the candidate or an elector entitled to vote at that election.

In considering the petition, the court may inquire whether or not the petition is duly signed, and so far as rolls and voting are concerned may inquire into the identity of persons, and whether their votes were improperly admitted or rejected, assuming the roll to be correct, but the court shall not inquire into the correctness of any roll.

For elections of officers to Aboriginal Land Councils under the Aboriginal Land Rights Act 1983 (NSW), or a Rural Lands Board under the Rural Lands Protection Act 1998 (NSW), the Land and Environment Court acts to consider disputed returns.

== History ==
The Court's jurisdiction over disputed electoral returns can be traced to the practices of the United Kingdom Parliament. Until 1604, disputed returns were decided by the King in Chancery. From 1604 to 1868, the British House of Commons exercised the jurisdiction. The Grenville Act 1770 (UK) provided for the determination of disputes by a Select Committee of the House of Commons. Later, a committee of 11 members were chosen by ballot to report their decision to the House. In essence, the parliament had the jurisdiction to determine whether a person had been properly elected, rather than the Courts. In 1868, the Parliamentary Elections Act 1868 (UK) was passed conferring jurisdiction on two judges of the Queen's Bench. The transfer of jurisdiction from Parliament to the courts was hastened by a concern with the partisanship of Parliament in ruling on electoral disputes.

At the time of Federation of Australia, Western Australia and Tasmania had transferred jurisdiction over disputed returns to their Supreme Courts. South Australia and Queensland had created hybrid tribunals. Victoria and New South Wales retained the exclusive jurisdiction to determine disputed returns for themselves. New South Wales gave the Supreme Court exclusive jurisdiction over disputed returns with the introduction of section 32 of the Parliamentary Electorates and Elections (Amendment) Act 1928.

The High Court of Australia sits as the Australian Court of Disputed Returns for federal elections. Prior to the enactment of the Electoral and Referendum Amendment Act (No 1) 2001, which commenced on 16 July 2001, the High Court could refer federal electoral disputes to the Supreme Court of a state.

== See also ==
- List of New South Wales courts and tribunals
