= William Missingham =

Australian politician

William Thomas Missingham (15 May 1868 – 1 February 1933) was an Australian politician.

He was born at Jamberoo to farmer David Missingham and Priscilla, née Noble. Educated at Jamberoo and Kiama, he moved to the Richmond River area in 1890 to manage the Pearce Creek butter factory and, in 1898, became a dairy farmer. On 25 November 1891, he married Margaret Elizabeth Dorrough, with whom he had four children. He served on Terania Shire Council from 1906 to 1922 and as president from 1909 to 1922; he was also vice-president (1914–17) and president (1918–22) of the Shires Association of New South Wales. In 1922, he was elected to the New South Wales Legislative Assembly as a Progressive member for Byron; he was the party's deputy leader from 1925 to 1932 (it had become the Country Party in 1927). With the re-introduction of single-member districts in 1927, he became member for Lismore. Missingham held his seat until his death at Croydon in 1933.

New South Wales Legislative Assembly
Preceded by Tom Swiney	Member for Byron; 1922–1927; Served alongside: Nesbitt/Gillies, Perdriau/Stuart	Succeeded by Arthur Budd
Preceded by New seat	Member for Lismore; 1927–1933	Succeeded by William Frith
