= François Gérard =

French painter (1770–1837)

Francois Gérard
- Portrait by Antoine-Jean Gros, c. 1790
- Born: François Pascal Simon Gérard; 4 May 1770 (Note: Some sources say he was born on 4 May 1770, however his tombstone (Montparnasse Cemetery, 1st division) reads: "Ici reposent – François Pascal Simon baron Gérard, né à Rome le 12 mars 1770, mort à Paris le 11 janvier 1837 – Jacques Alexandre Gérard, né à Paris le 13 avril 1780, mort à Paris le 28 octobre 1832 – Marguerite Françoise Matteï, [épouse] de F. Gérard, née à Rome le 7 avril 1775, morte à Auteuil le 1er décembre 1848 – Sophie Catherine Sylvoz, [épouse d'Alexandre] Gérard, née à Chambéry le 8 [octobre] 1792, morte à Paris le 16 mars 1867 – La famille à leur mémoire chère."); Rome, Papal States
- Died: 11 January 1837; Paris, France
- Education: Pajou, Brenet, David
- Known for: Portrait painting

François Pascal Simon Gérard (French pronunciation: [fʁɑ̃swa paskal simɔ̃ ʒeʁaʁ], 4 May 1770 – 11 January 1837), titled as Baron Gérard in 1809, was a French painter. He was born in Rome, where his father occupied a post in the house of the French ambassador, and his mother was Italian.

A student of Jacques-Louis David, Gérard became one of the leading painters of the First French Empire (1804–1815) and the Bourbon Restoration (1815–1830). Court painter to Emperor Napoleon and later First Painter to Kings Louis XVIII and Charles X, Gérard enjoyed great renown across Europe. Nicknamed “the painter of kings, the king of painters”, he was the portraitist of choice for many European royal families. His salon was one of the most celebrated of its time and welcomed some of the era’s most eminent figures.

After he was made a baron of the Empire in 1809 by Emperor Napoleon, he was known formally as Baron Gérard.

== Life and career ==
François Gérard was born in Rome to J. S. Gérard and Cleria Matteï. At the age of twelve, Gérard obtained admission into the Pension du Roi in Paris. From the Pension, he passed to the studio of the sculptor Augustin Pajou, which he left at the end of two years for the studio of the history painter Nicolas-Guy Brenet, whom he quit almost immediately to place himself under Jacques-Louis David.

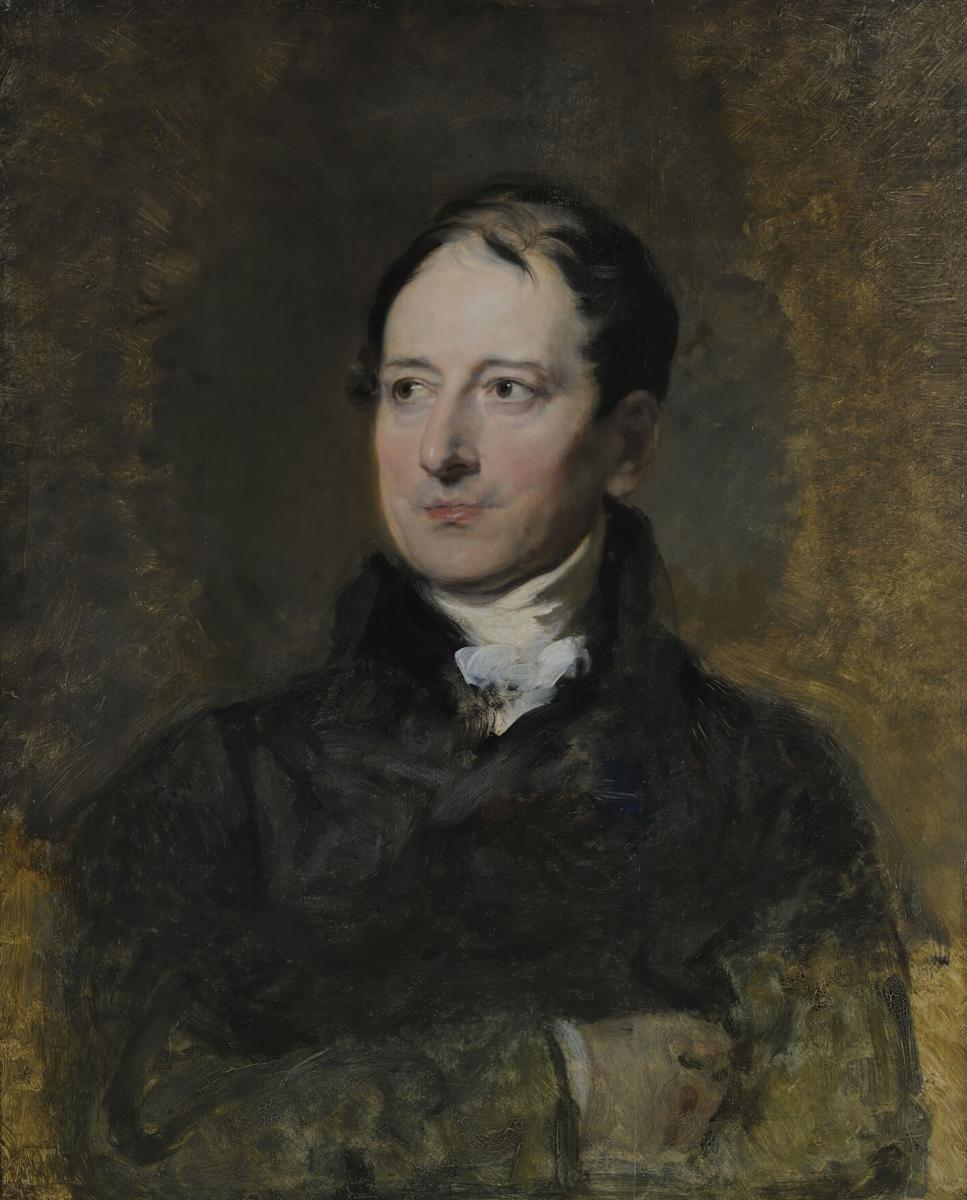
Portrait by Thomas Lawrence (c. 1824)

In 1789, he competed for the Prix de Rome, which was carried off by his comrade Girodet. The following year (1790), he once more showed up, but the passing of his father prevented him from finishing his work and forced him to travel to Rome with his mother. He eventually made it back to Paris in 1791, but due to his extreme poverty, he was forced to abandon his studies in favor of a job that would pay him money right away. David at once availed himself of his help, and one of that master's most celebrated portraits, of Louis-Michel Le Pelletier de Saint-Fargeau, may owe much to the hand of Gérard. This painting was executed early in 1793, the year in which Gérard, at the request of David, was named a member of the revolutionary tribunal, from the fatal decisions of which he, however, invariably absented himself.

In 1794, he obtained the first prize in a competition, the subject of which was The Tenth of August, that is, the storming of the Tuileries Palace on that date in 1792. Further stimulated by the successes of his rival and friend Girodet in the Salons of 1793 and 1794, Gérard (aided by Jean-Baptiste Isabey, the miniaturist) produced in 1795 his famous Bélisaire. In 1796, a portrait of his generous friend (conserved today in the Louvre) obtained undisputed success, and the money received from Isabey for these two works enabled Gérard to execute in 1797 his Psyche et l'Amour (illustration). (Note: At the Hong Kong Book Fair 2007, Hong Kong's Television and Entertainment Licensing Authority forced the publisher of a Chinese book, translated from Korean, Love Mythology: Love Stories in Greek and Roman Mythology: 12 Keys to Understand Myths of Love Theme (Author: Lee Eyun Kee Publisher: [Taiwan] Yuan Liou) bearing Gérard's "Psyché et l'Amour" on the cover to temporarily withdraw it from sale.) At last, in 1799, his portrait of Madame Mère established his position as one of the foremost portrait-painters of the day.

At the Salon of 1808, eight (and at the Salon of 1810, fourteen) portraits by him were exhibited, indicating the numbers he executed yearly. Figures of the Empire and of the Bourbon Restoration, as well as men and women of Europe, sat for Gérard. This was due in part to his manner and conversation, as his salon was frequented alongside his studio. Madame Germaine de Staël, George Canning, Charles de Talleyrand, and the Duke of Wellington have written about his society.

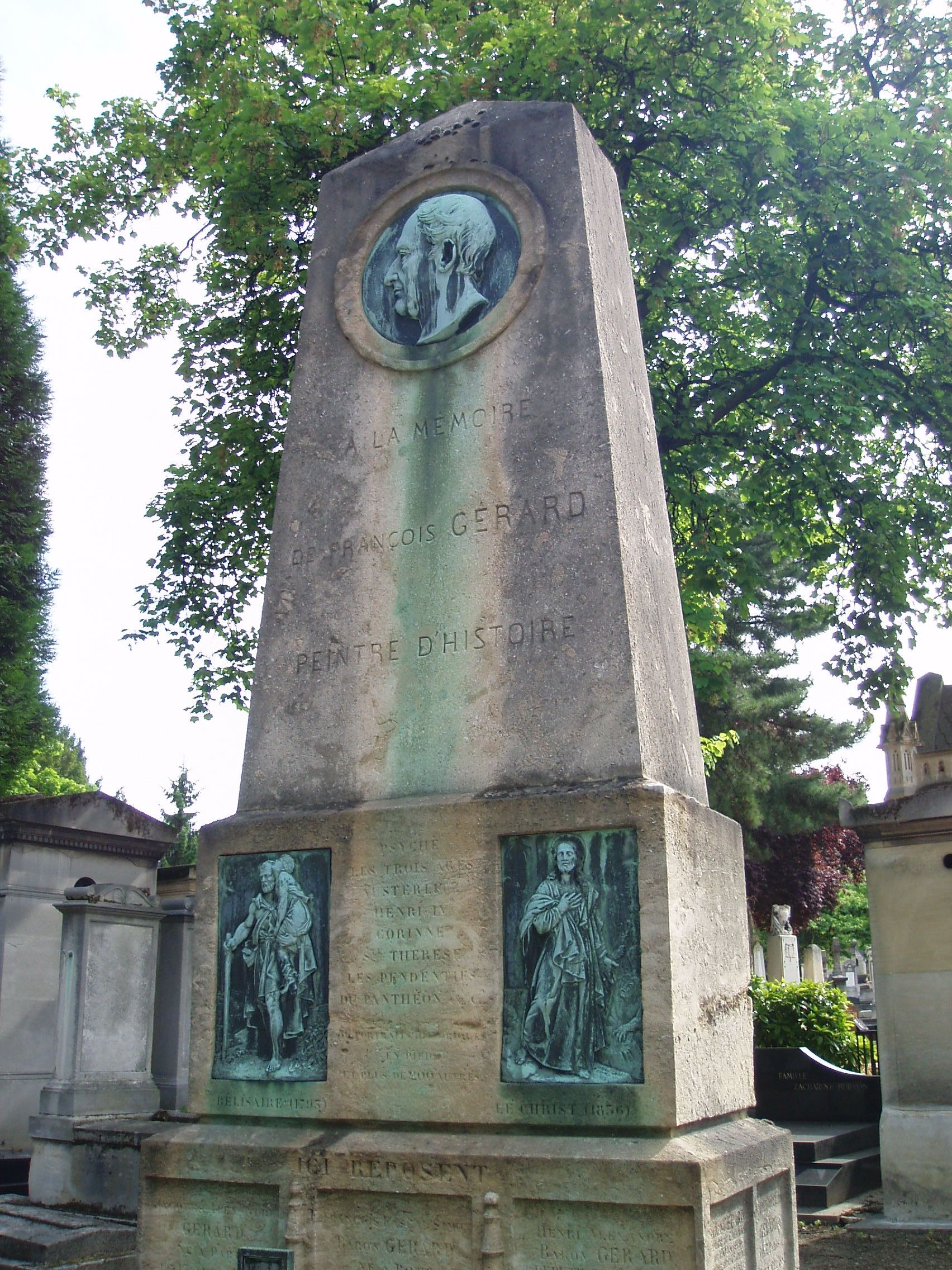
Family tomb in Montparnasse Cemetery

Rich and famous, Gérard was stung by remorse for earlier ambitions abandoned; at intervals, he had indeed striven with Girodet and other rivals to prove his strength at history painting, still a more prestigious genre than portraiture. His Bataille d'Austerlitz (1810) showed a breadth of invention and style which was even more conspicuous in L'Entrée d'Henri IV à Paris (at Versailles), the work with which in 1817 he paid homage to the returned Louis XVIII. After this date, Gérard declined, watching with impotent grief the progress of the Romantic school.

Loaded with honors – baron of the Empire in 1809, member of the Institut on 7 March 1812, officer of the Légion d'honneur, first painter to the king – he worked on, sad and discouraged. He painted several works to celebrate the Coronation of Charles X in 1825. In 1830 he was commissioned by Charles to produce a large history painting of his son Duke of Angoulême bidding farewell to the French Army expedition departing Toulon for the Conquest of Algeria. This was never executed as it was rapidly overtaken by the events of the July Revolution that brought down Charles and the Bourbon Dynasty.

The revolution of 1830 added to his disquiet, and on 11 January 1837, after three days of fever, he died. Gérard is best remembered for his portraits. The color of his paintings has suffered, but his drawings show in uninjured delicacy the purity of his line, and those of women are specially remarkable for a virginal simplicity and frankness of expression. His students included Heinrich Christoph Kolbe.

== Selected works ==
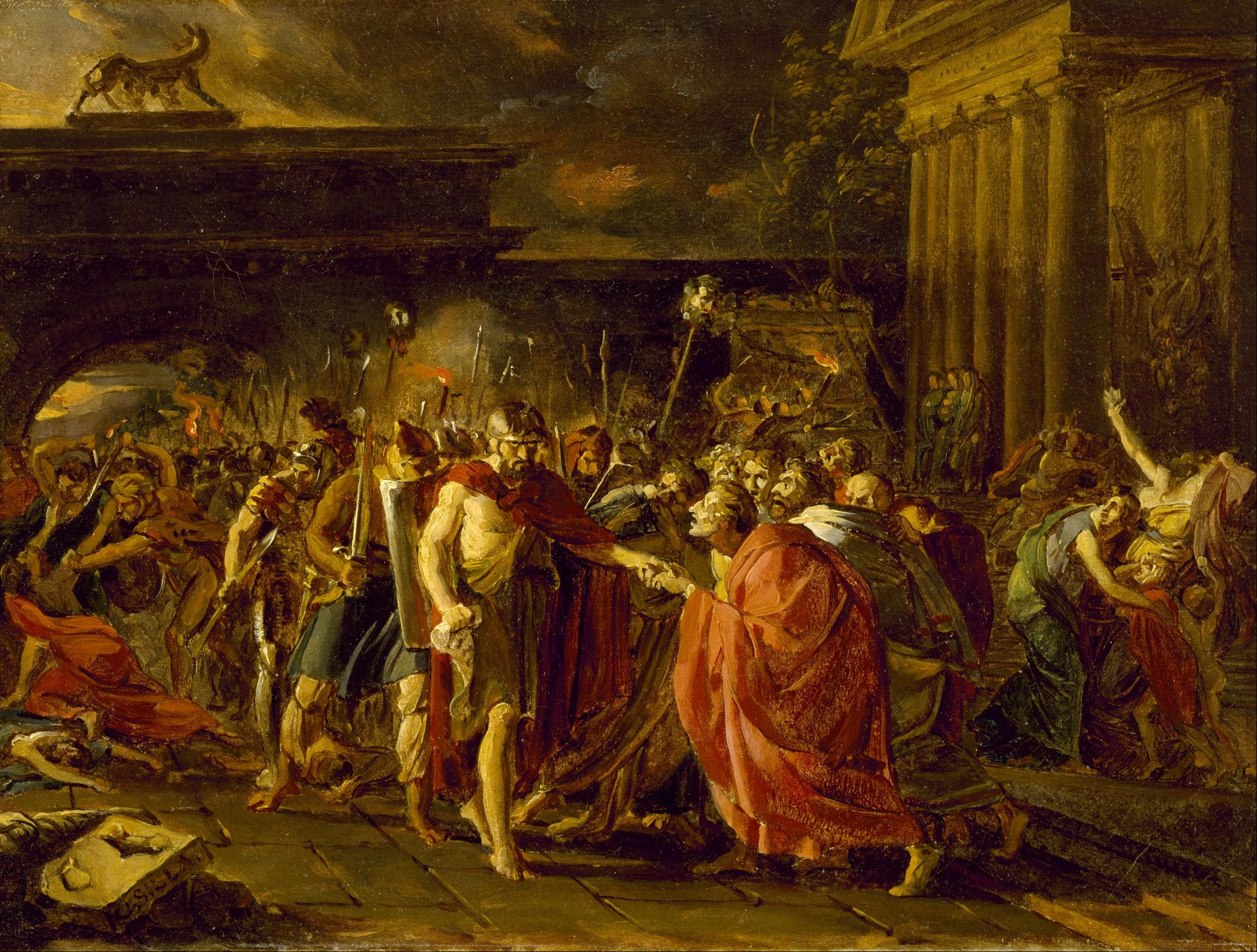
Marius Returning to Rome, 1789

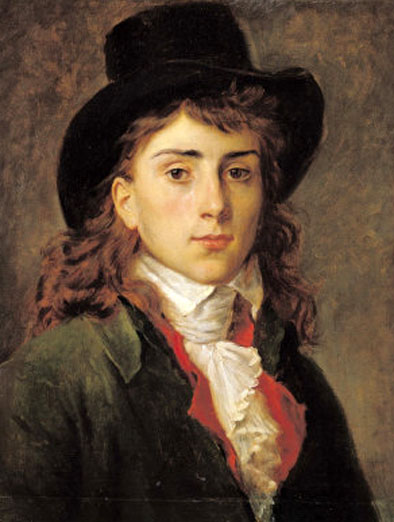
Antoine-Jean Gros, 1791

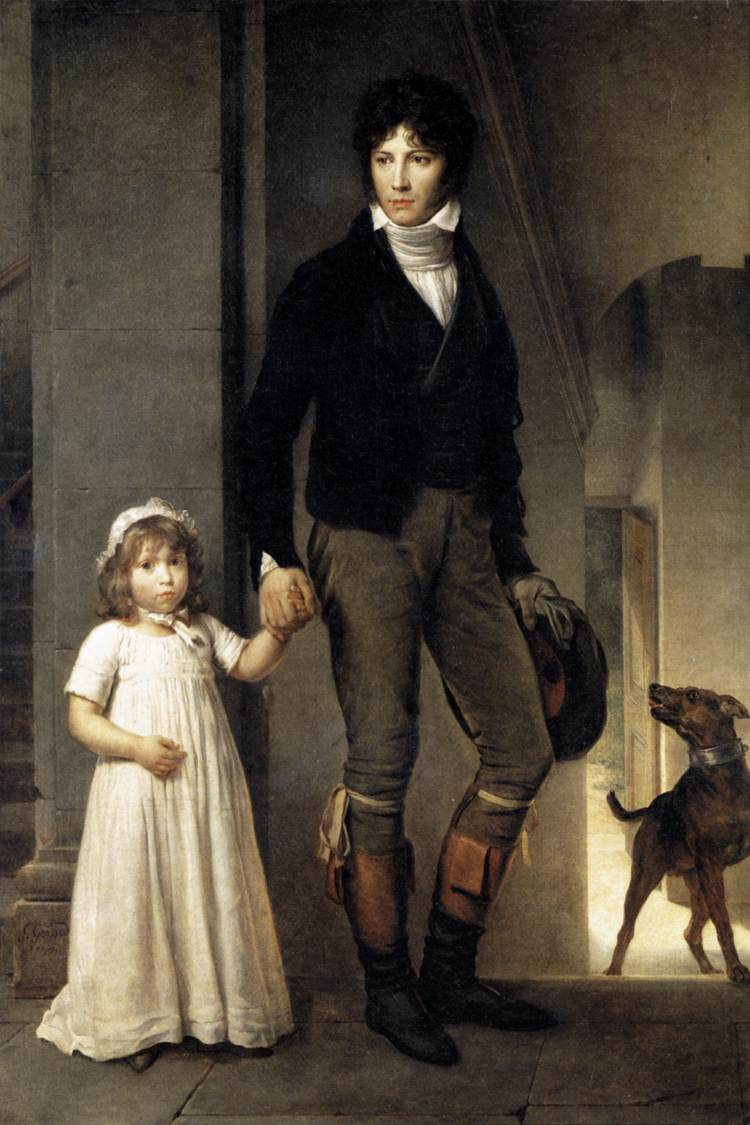
Jean-Baptiste Isabey and His Daughter, 1795

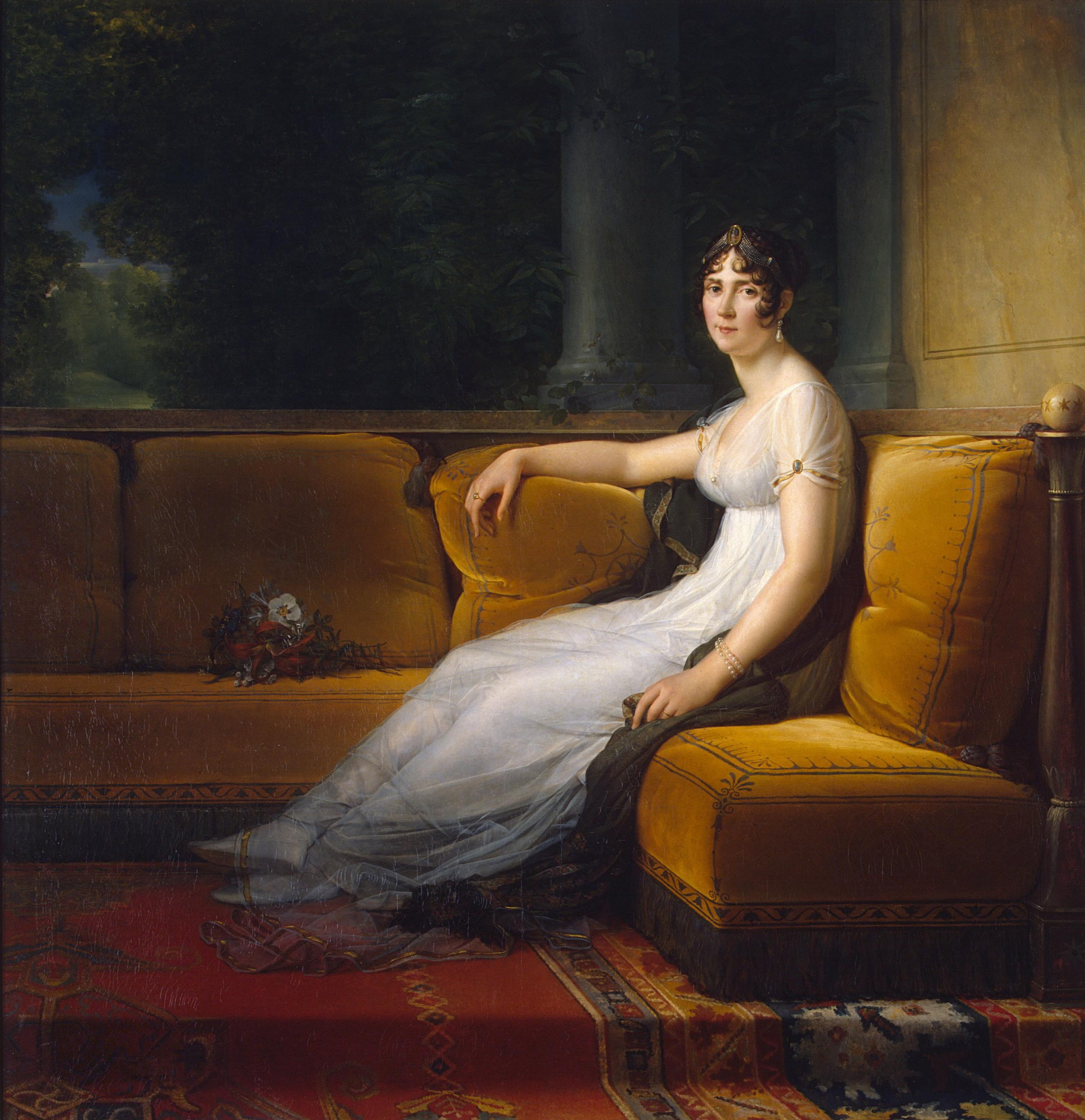
Portrait of Joséphine de Beauharnais, 1801

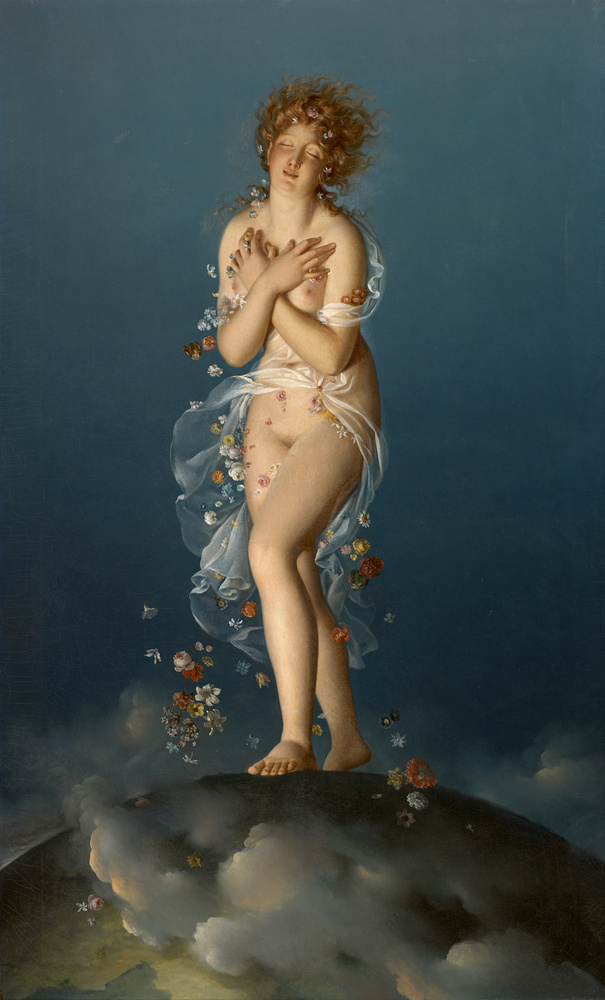
Flora Caressed by Zephyr, 1802

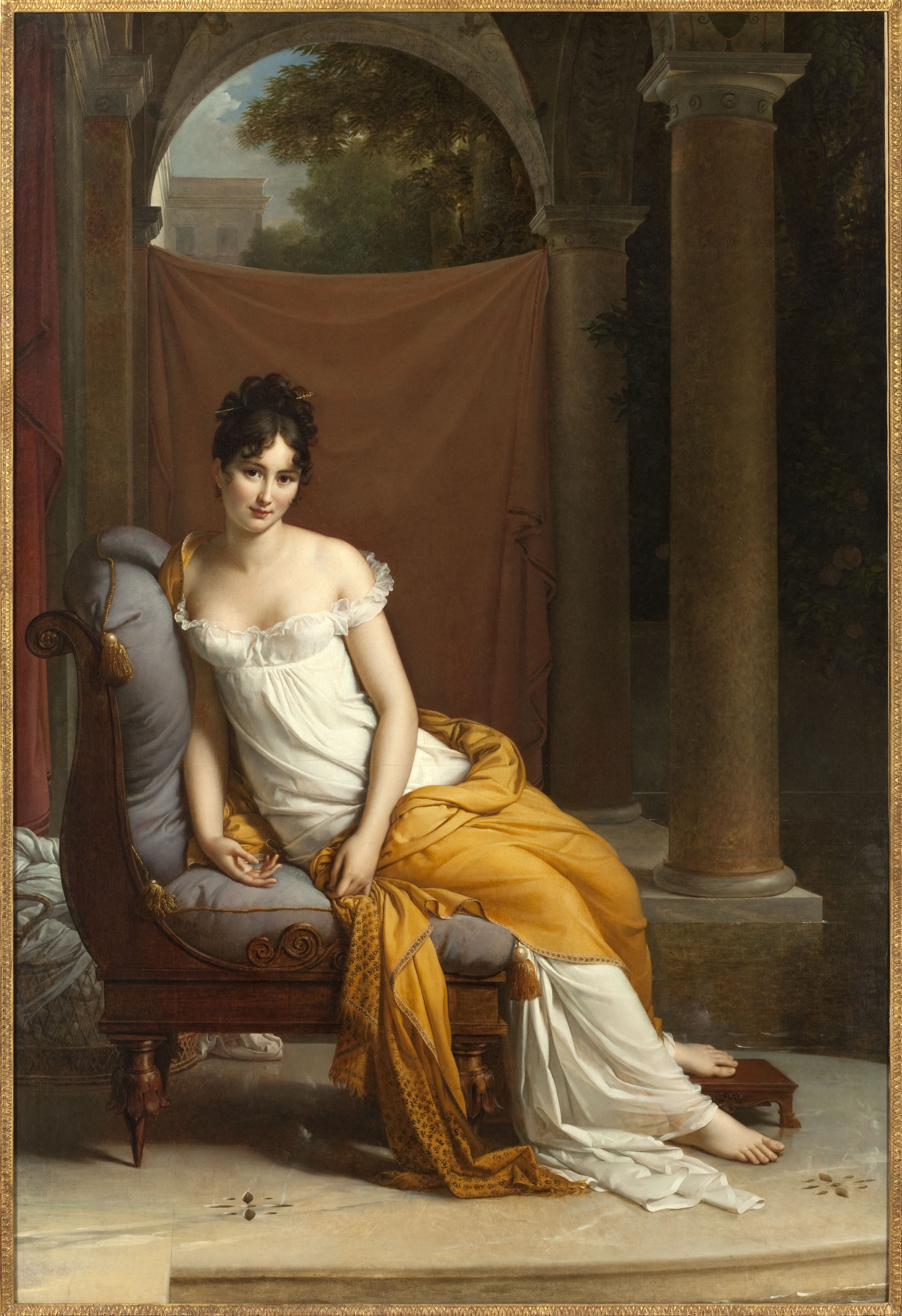
Portrait of Juliette Récamier, 1802

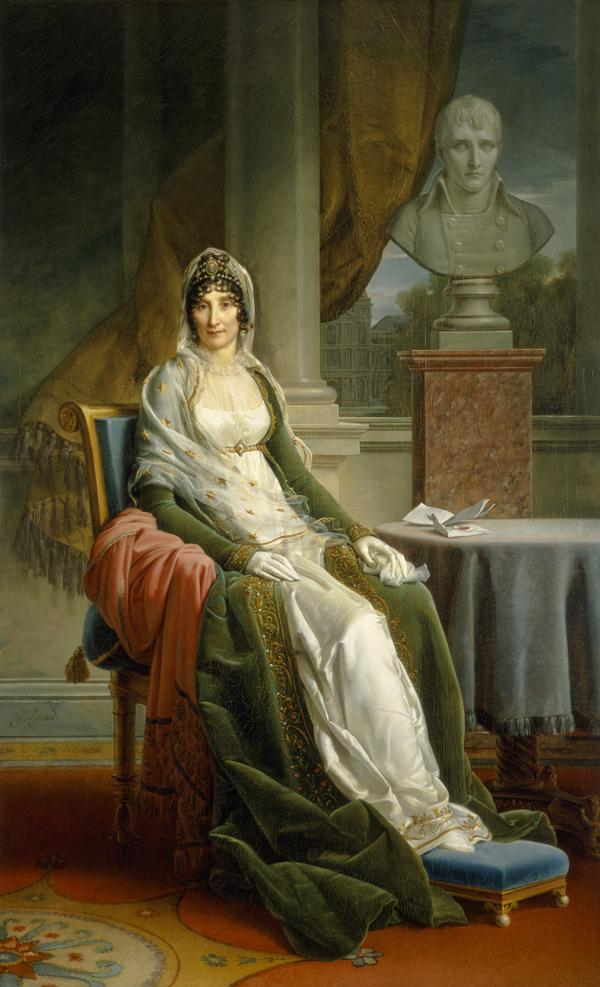
Portrait of Letizia Bonaparte, 1803

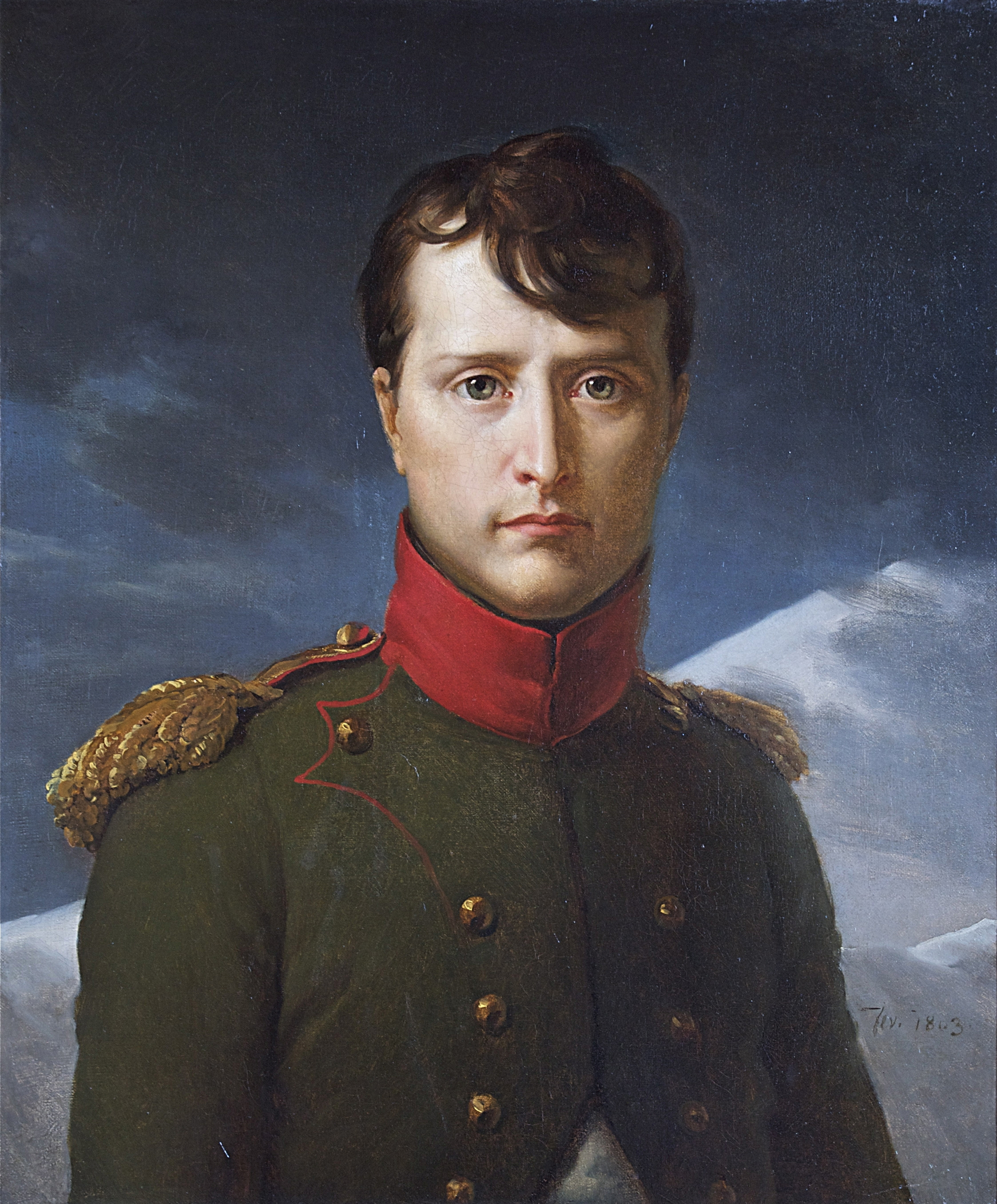
Napoleon Bonaparte as First Consul, 1803

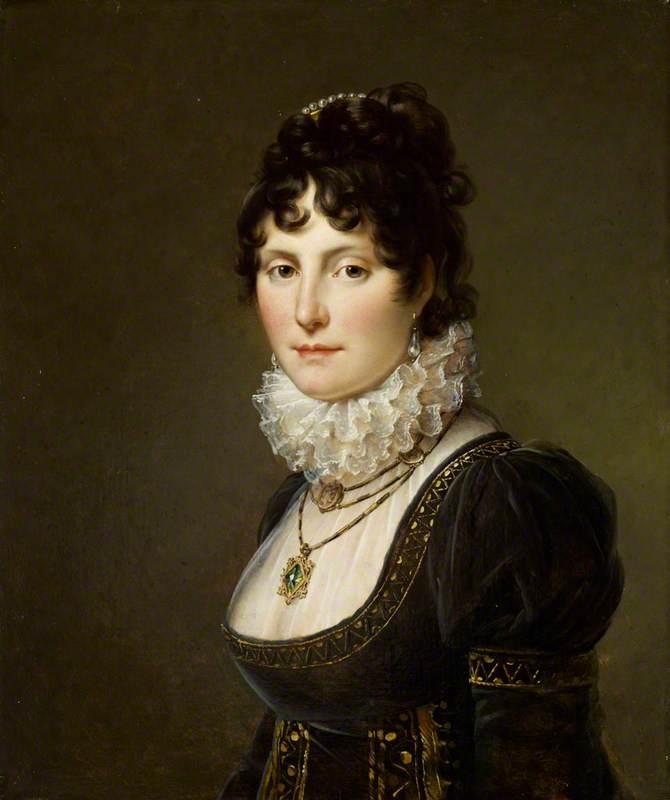
Portrait of Mary Nisbet, 1803

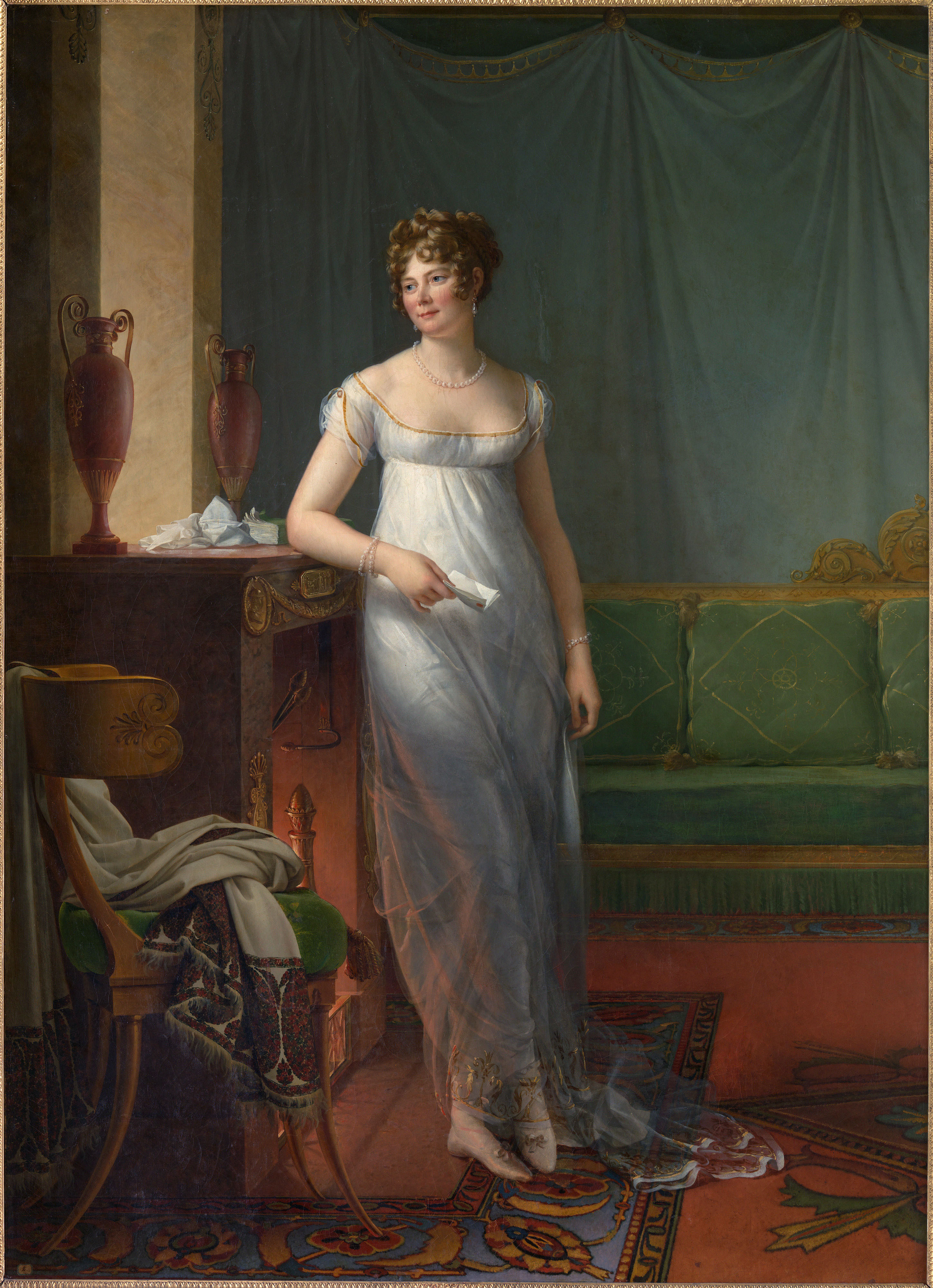
Catherine Grand, 1804

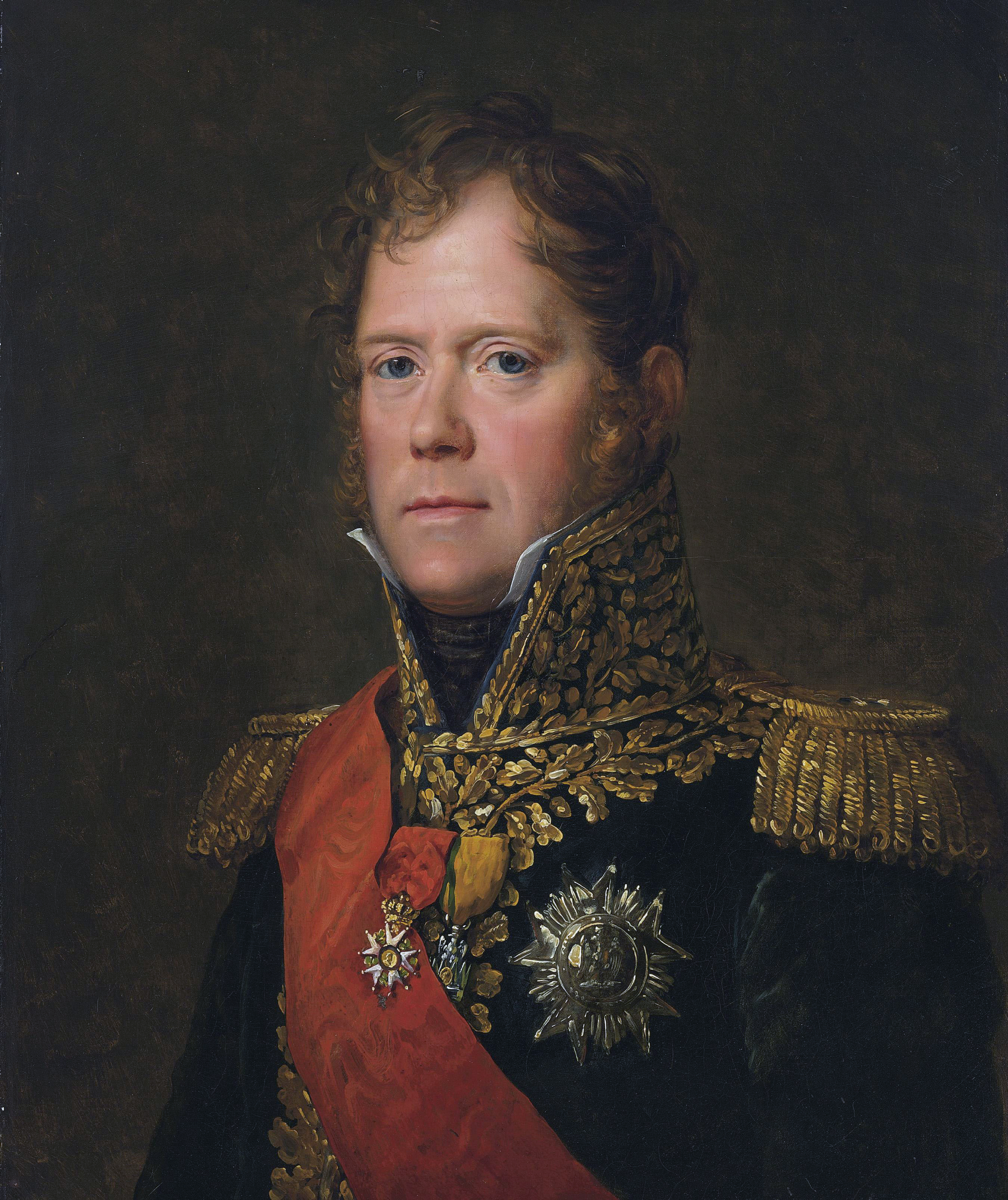
Marshal Michel Ney, 1805

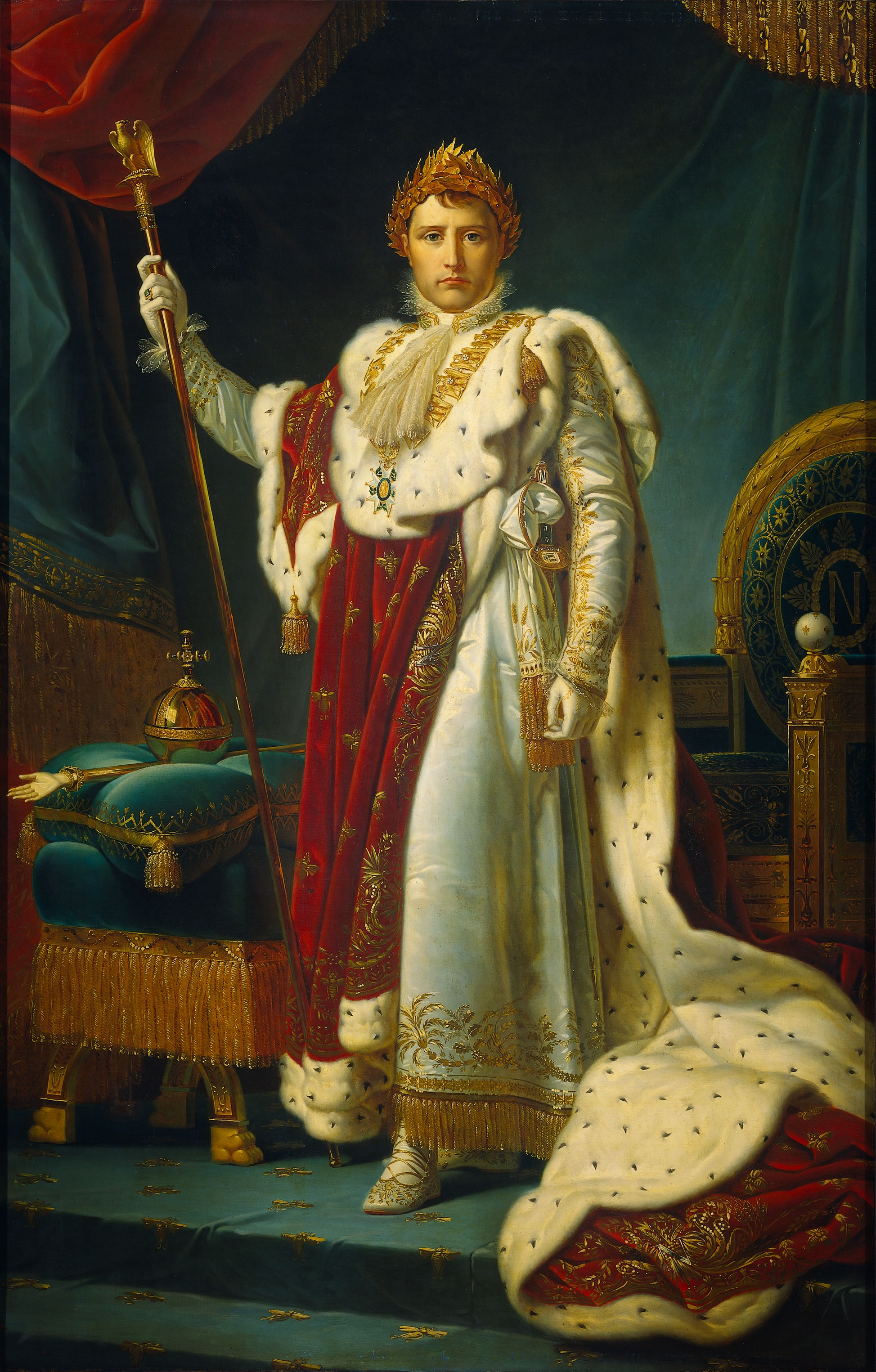
Napoleon I as Emperor, 1805

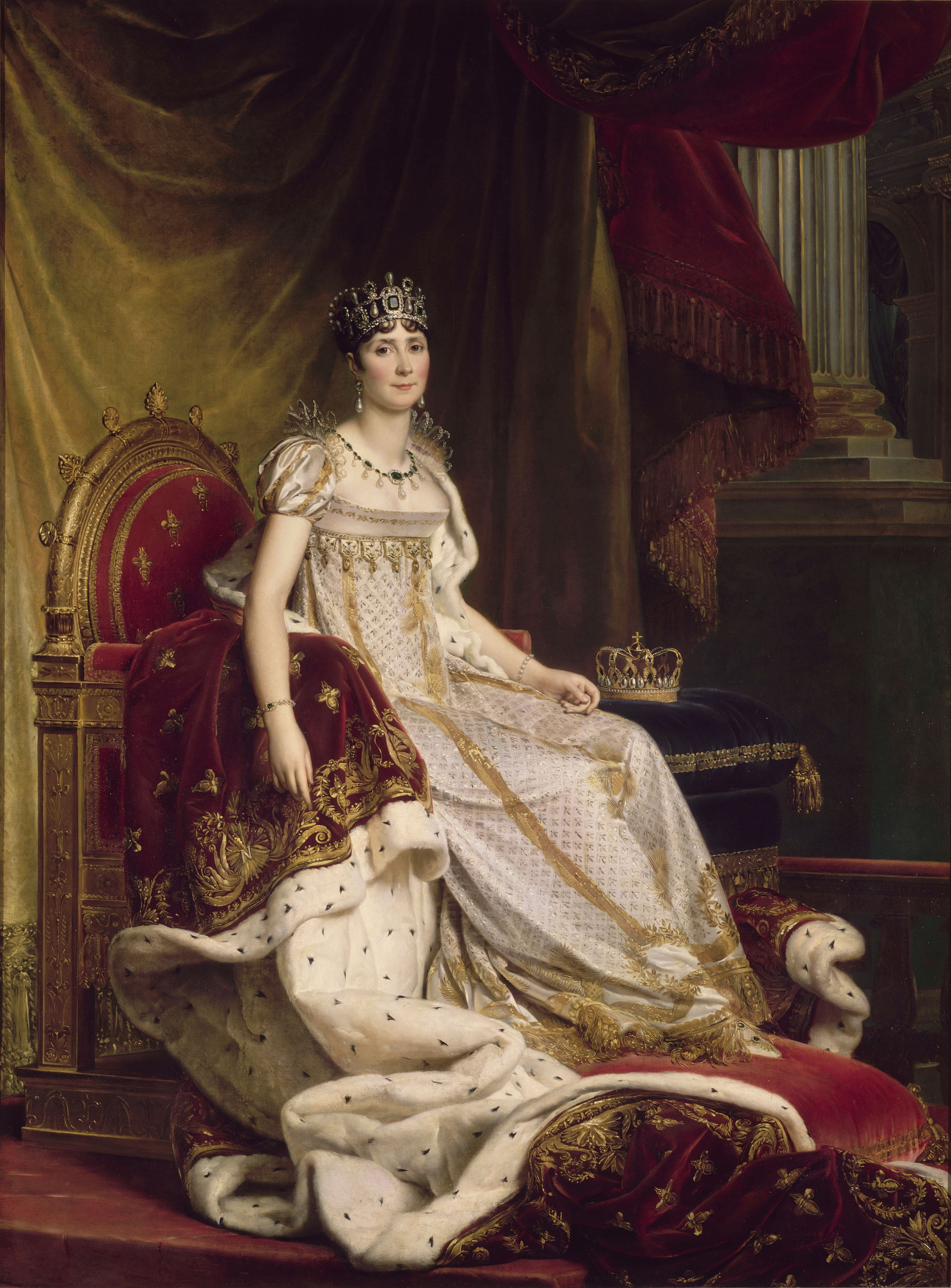
Portrait of Joséphine de Beauharnais, 1808

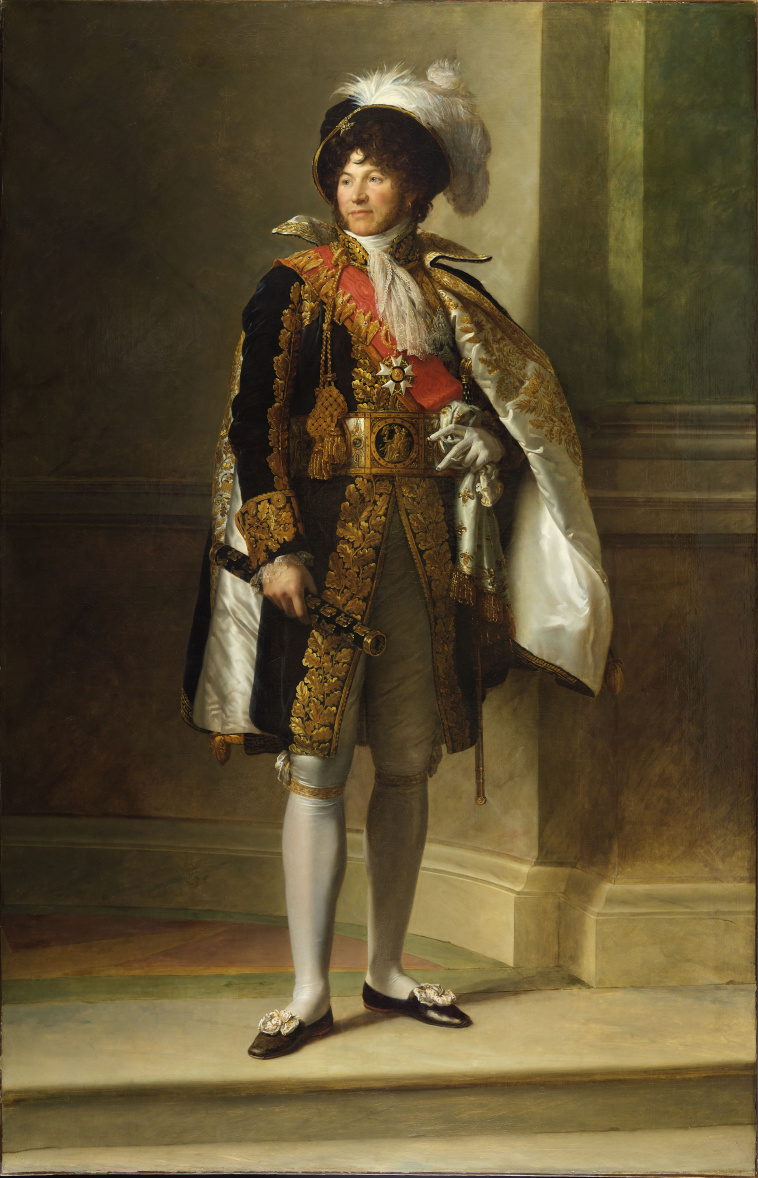
Portrait of Joachim Murat, 1808

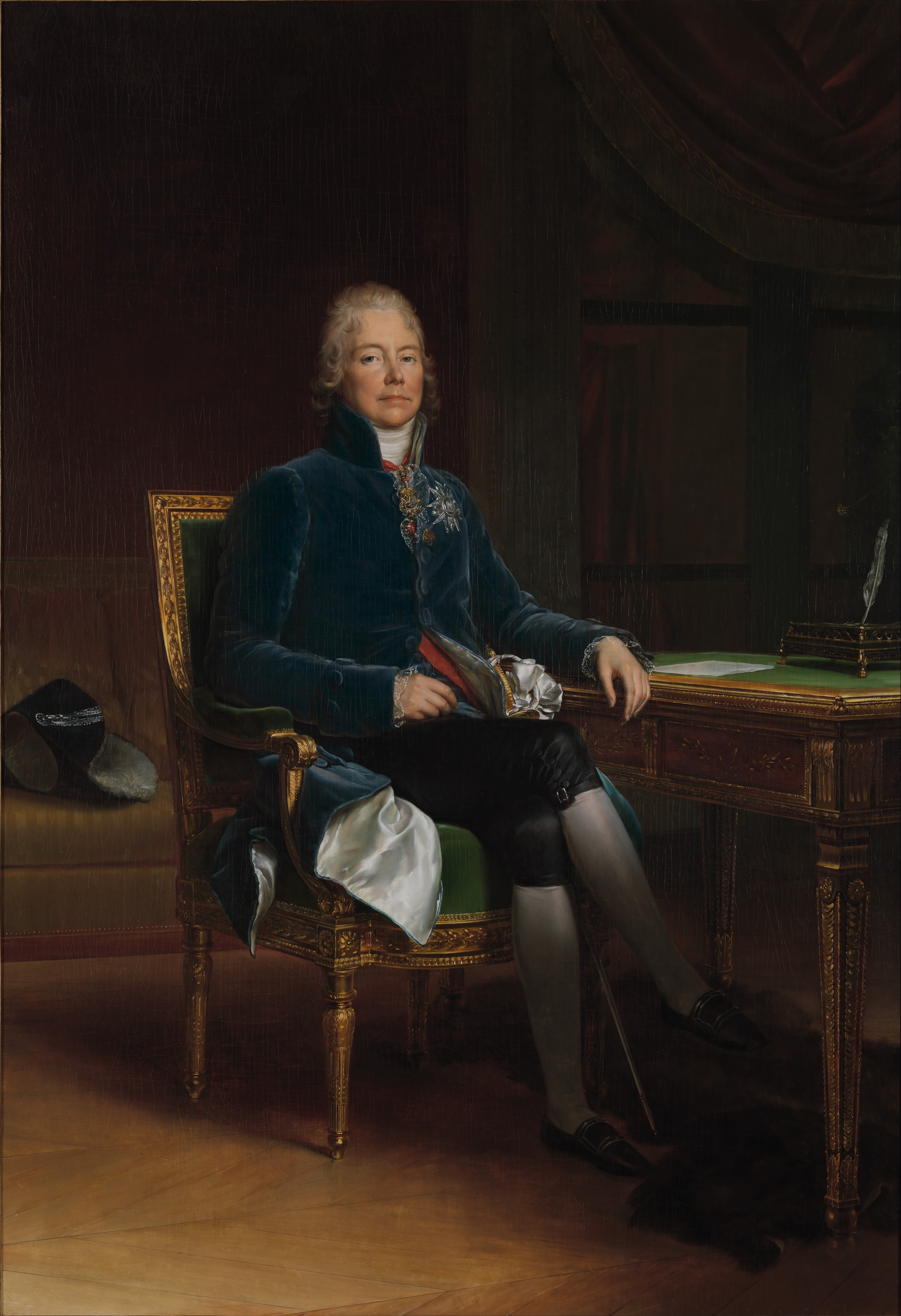
Portrait of Talleyrand, 1808

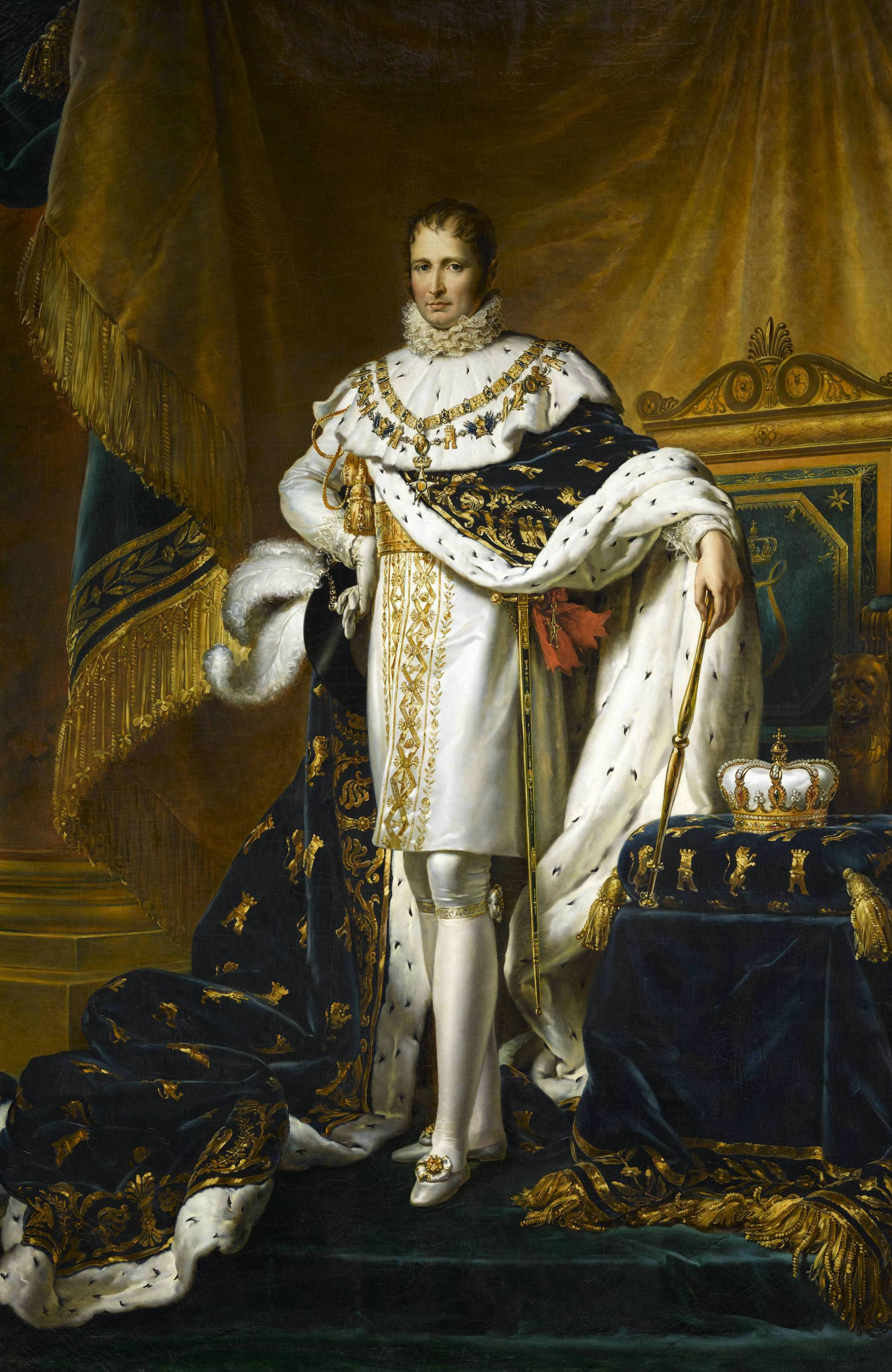
Portrait of Joseph Bonaparte, 1808

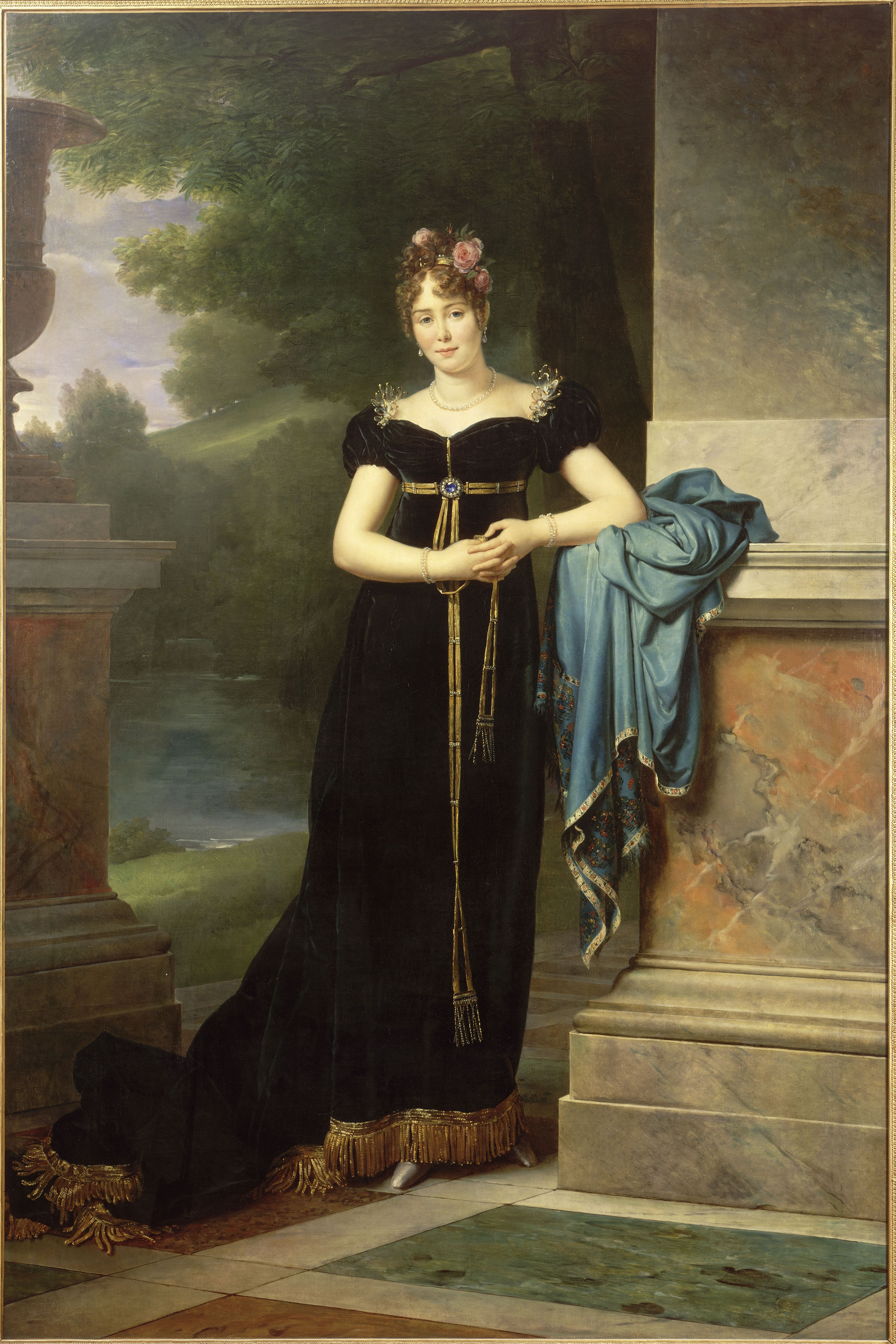
Portrait of Marie Walewska, 1810

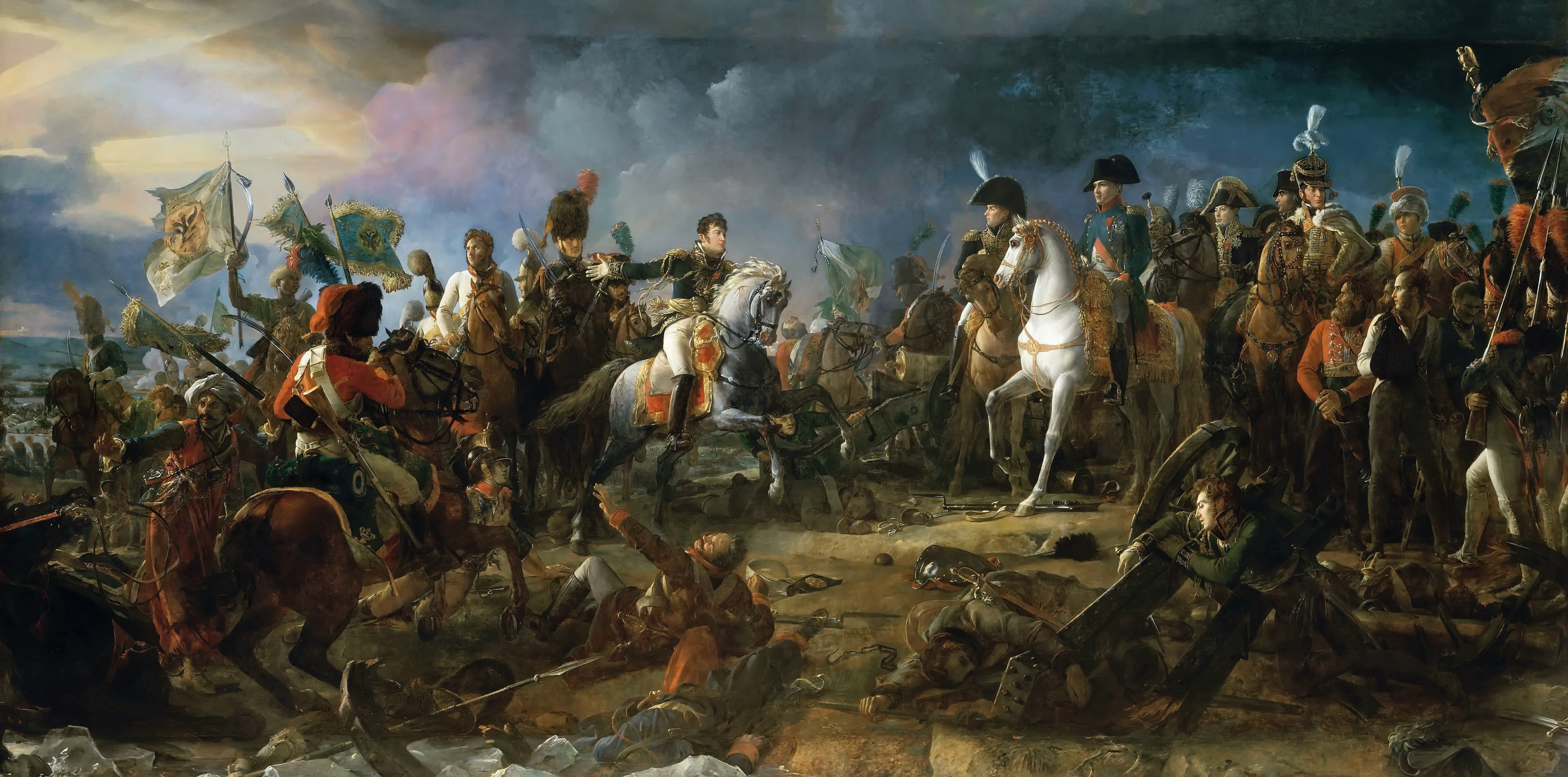
Napoleon at the Battle of Austerlitz, 1810

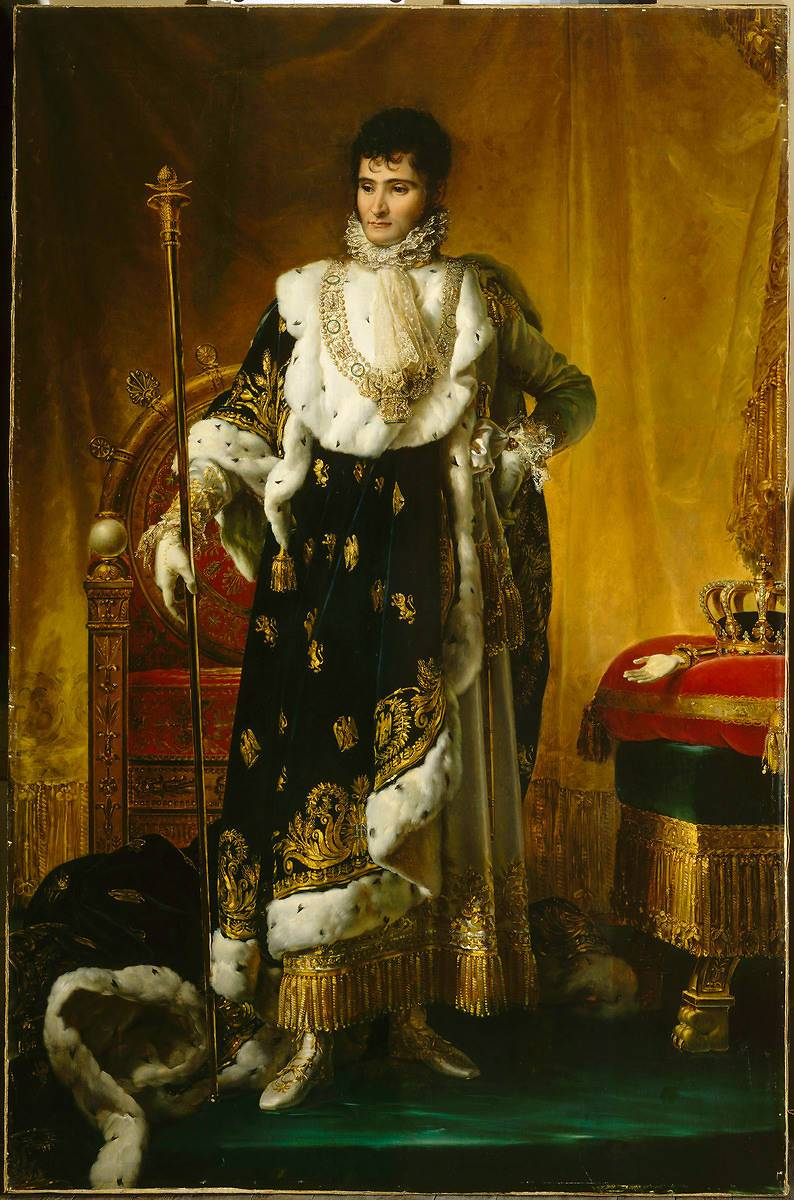
Portrait of Jérôme Bonaparte, 1811

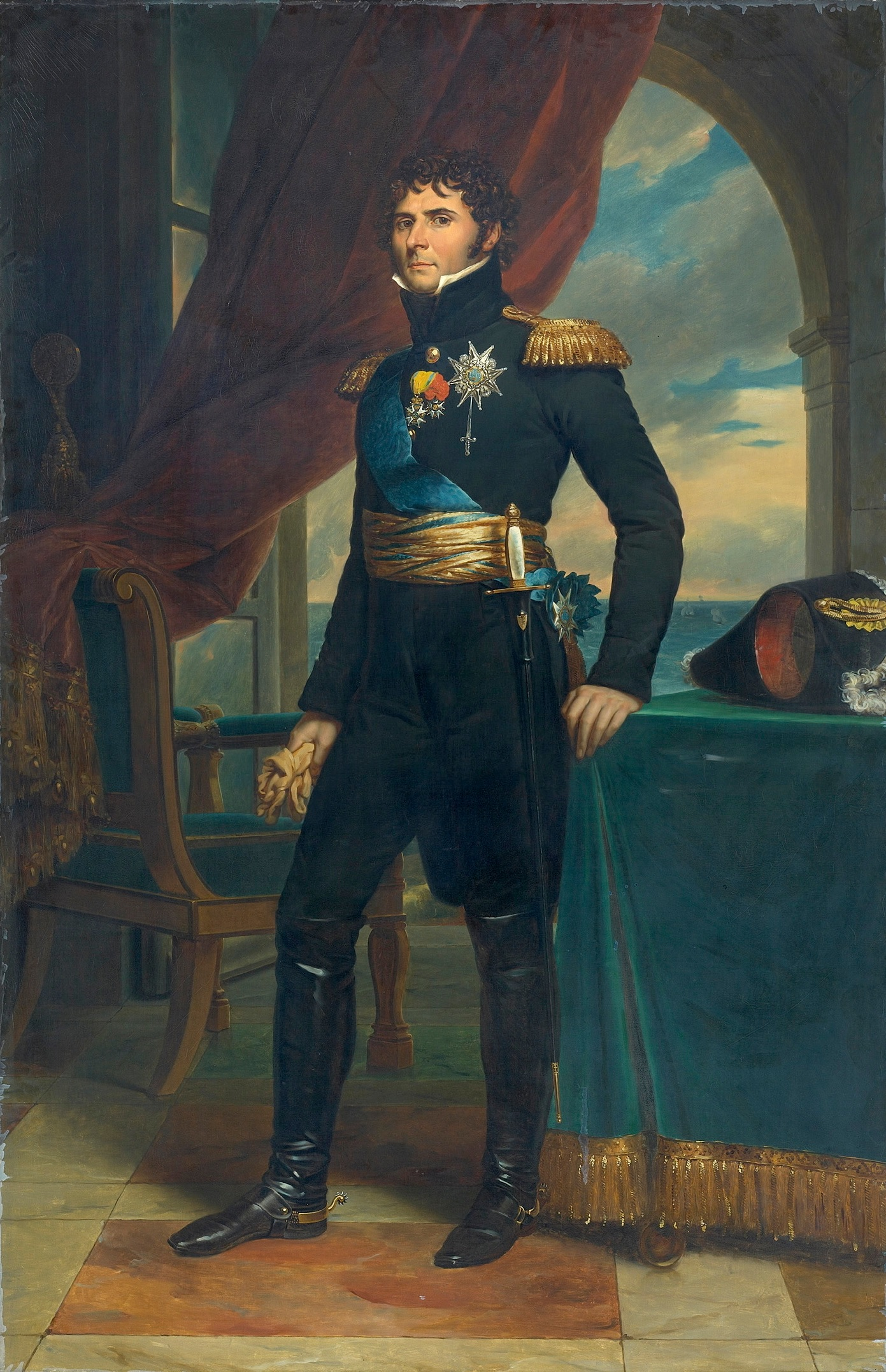
Portrait of Jean-Baptiste Jules Bernadotte, 1811

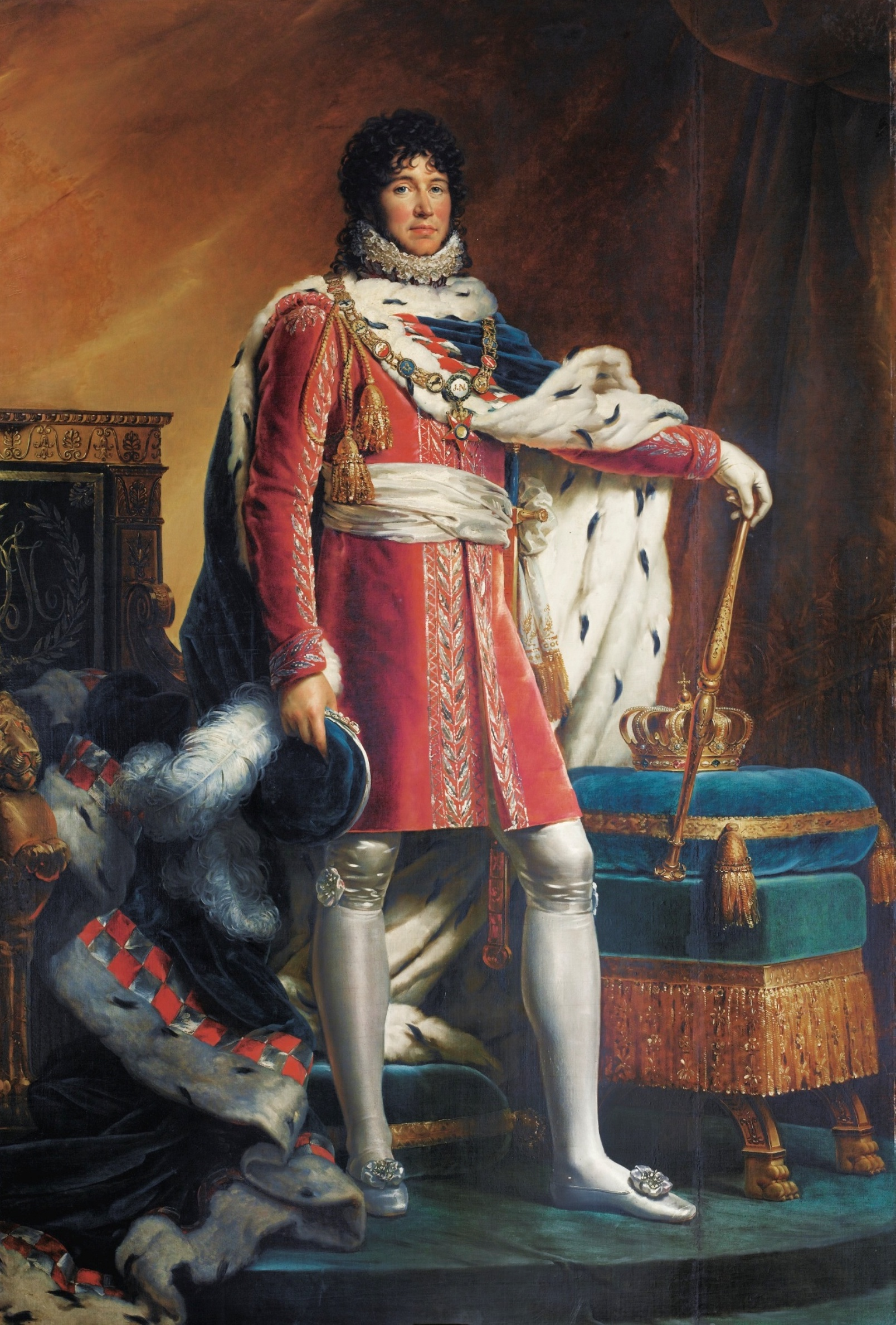
Portrait of Joachim Murat, king of Naples and of the Two Sicilies, 1811–1812, private collection, Paris

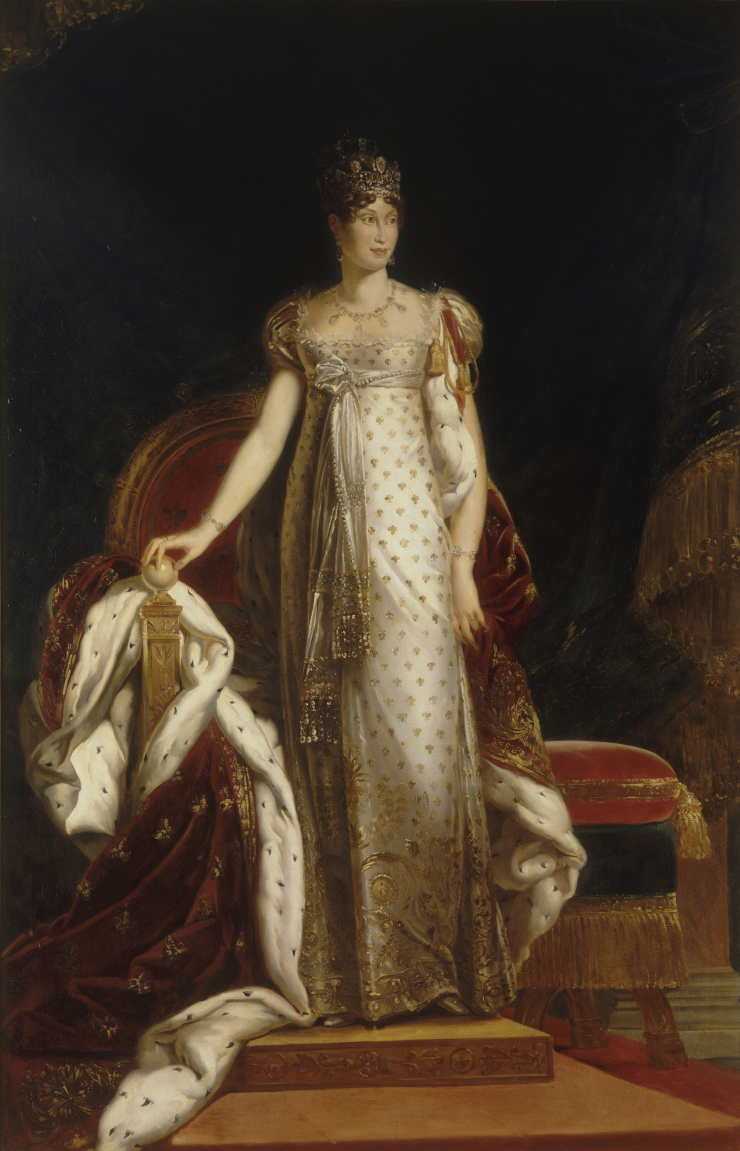
Portrait of Marie Louise, 1812

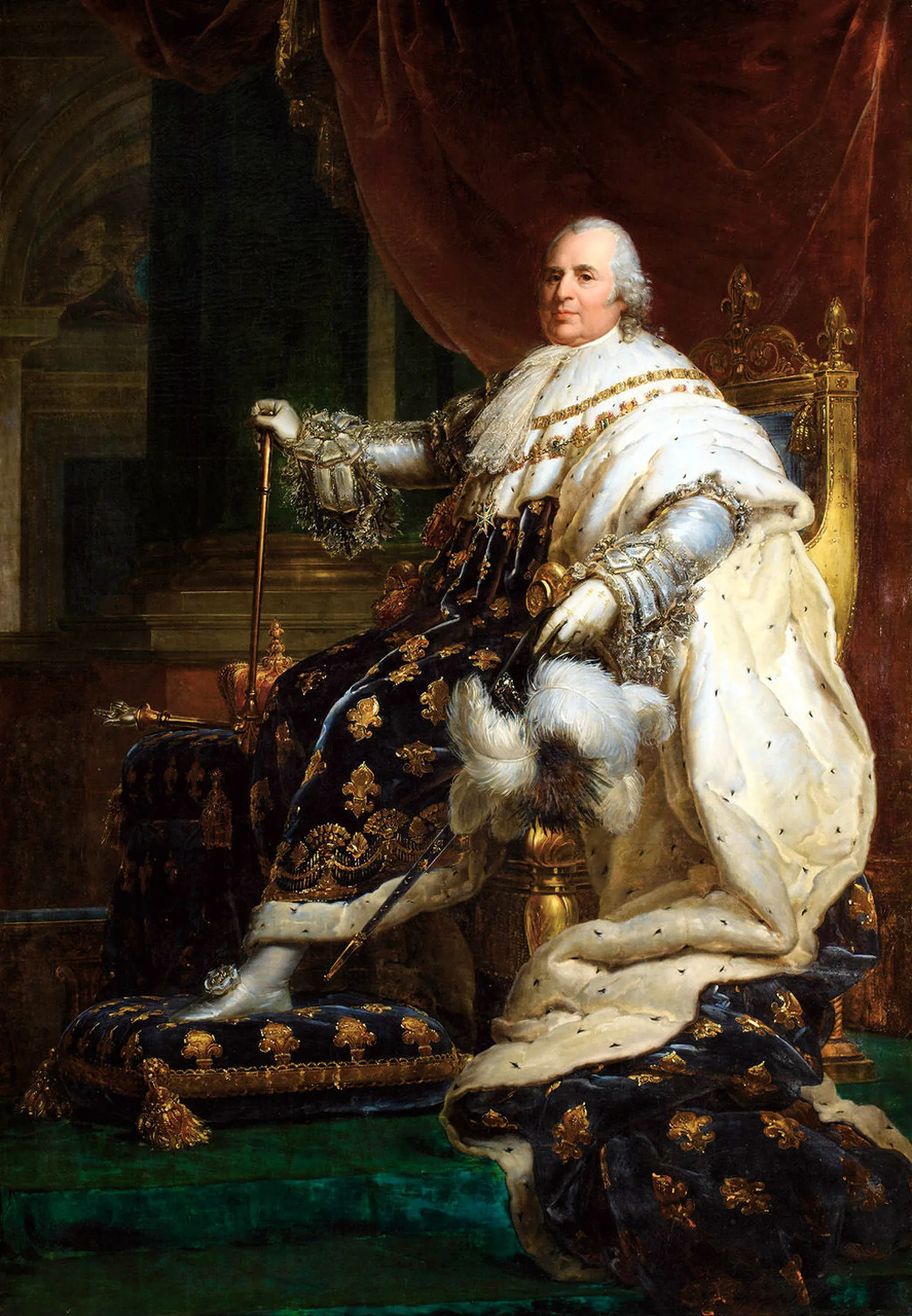
Portrait of Louis XVIII, 1814

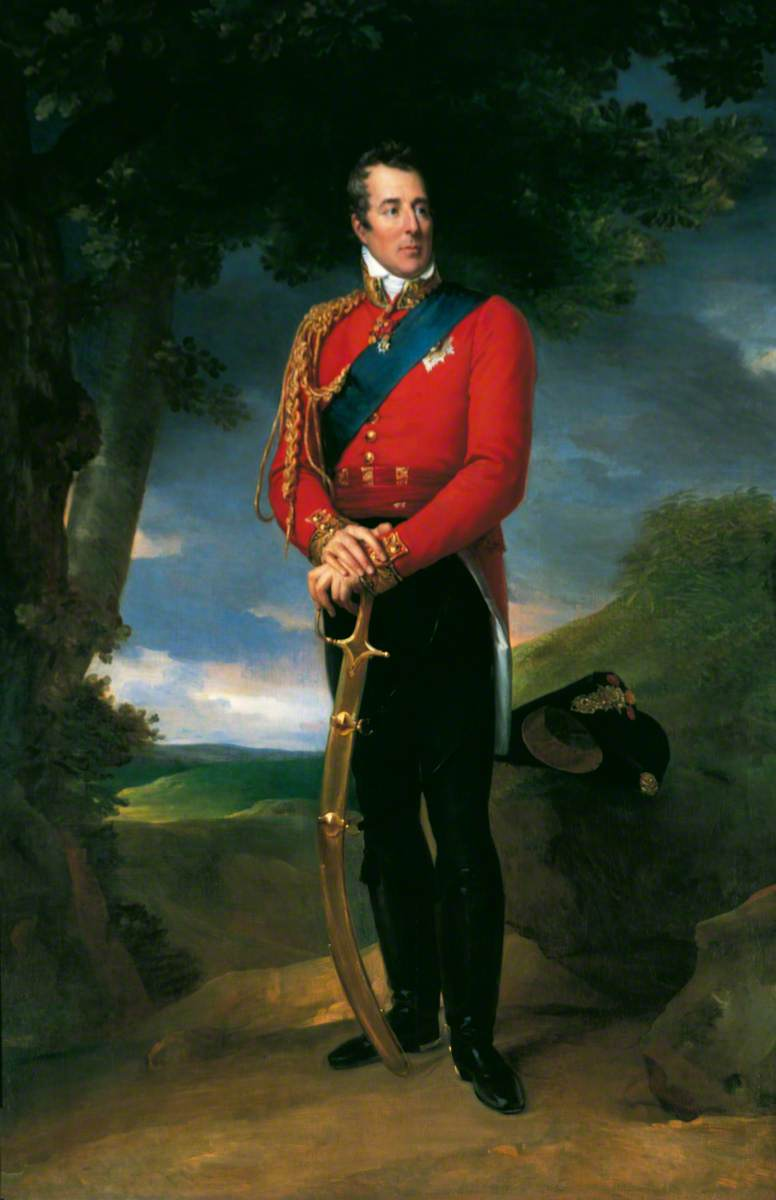
Portrait of the Duke of Wellington, 1814

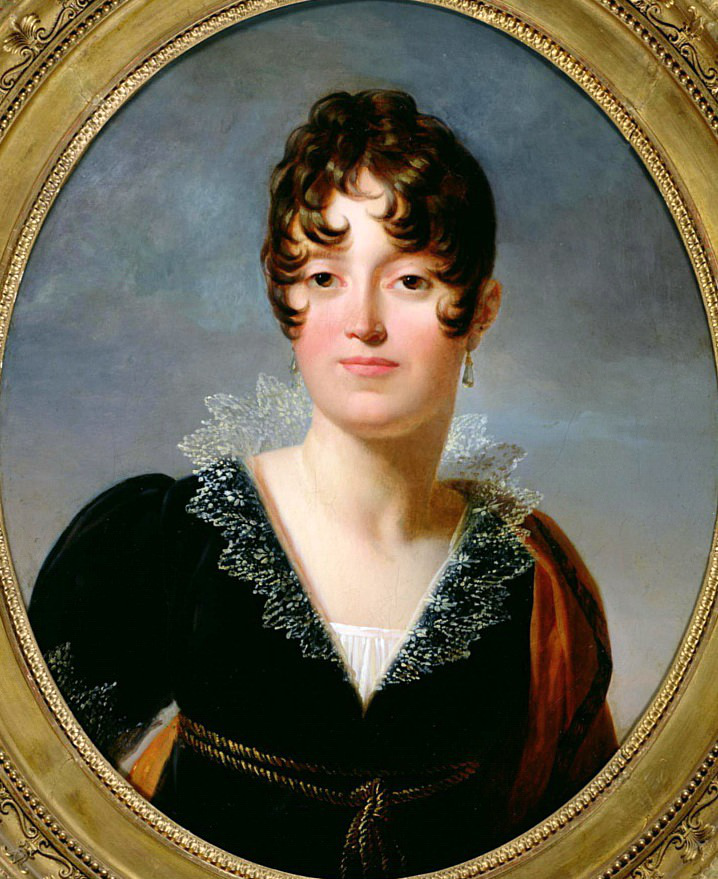
Portrait of Désirée Clary

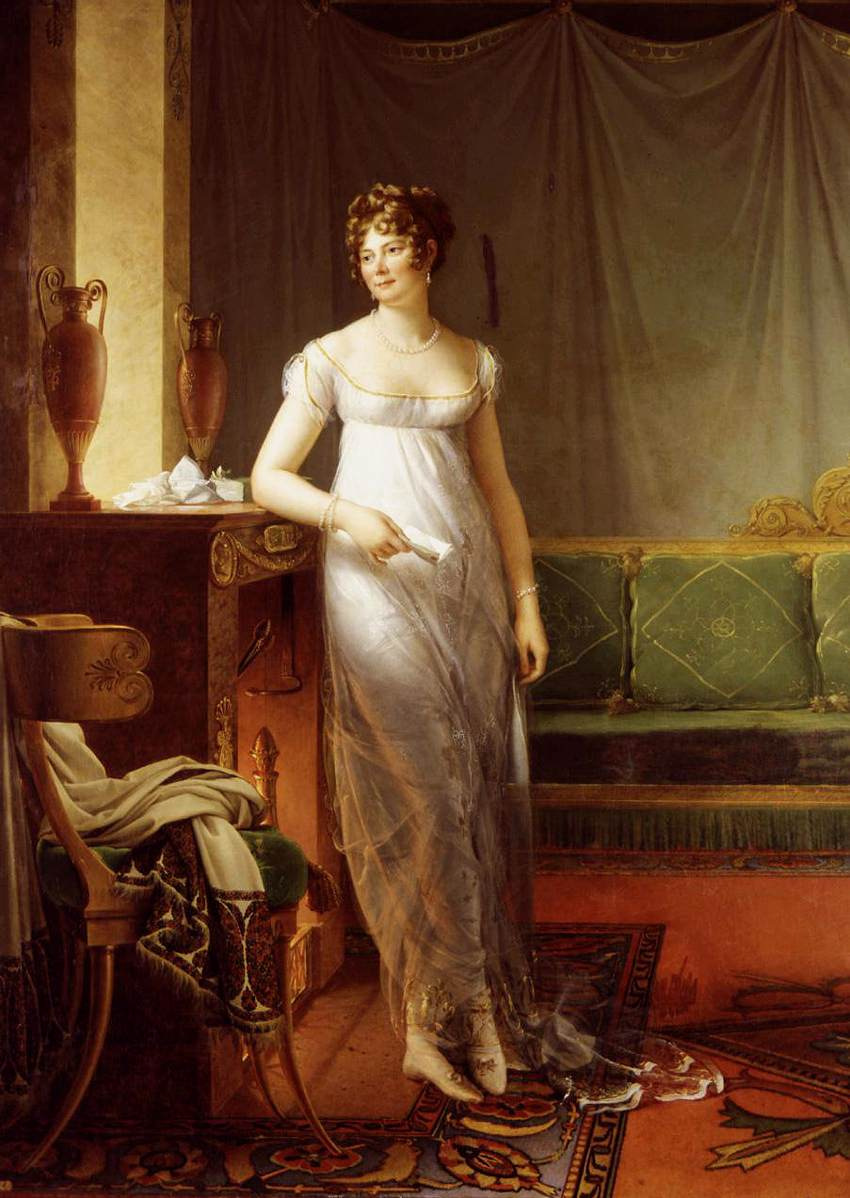
Portrait of Catherine Grand, Princesse de Bénévent

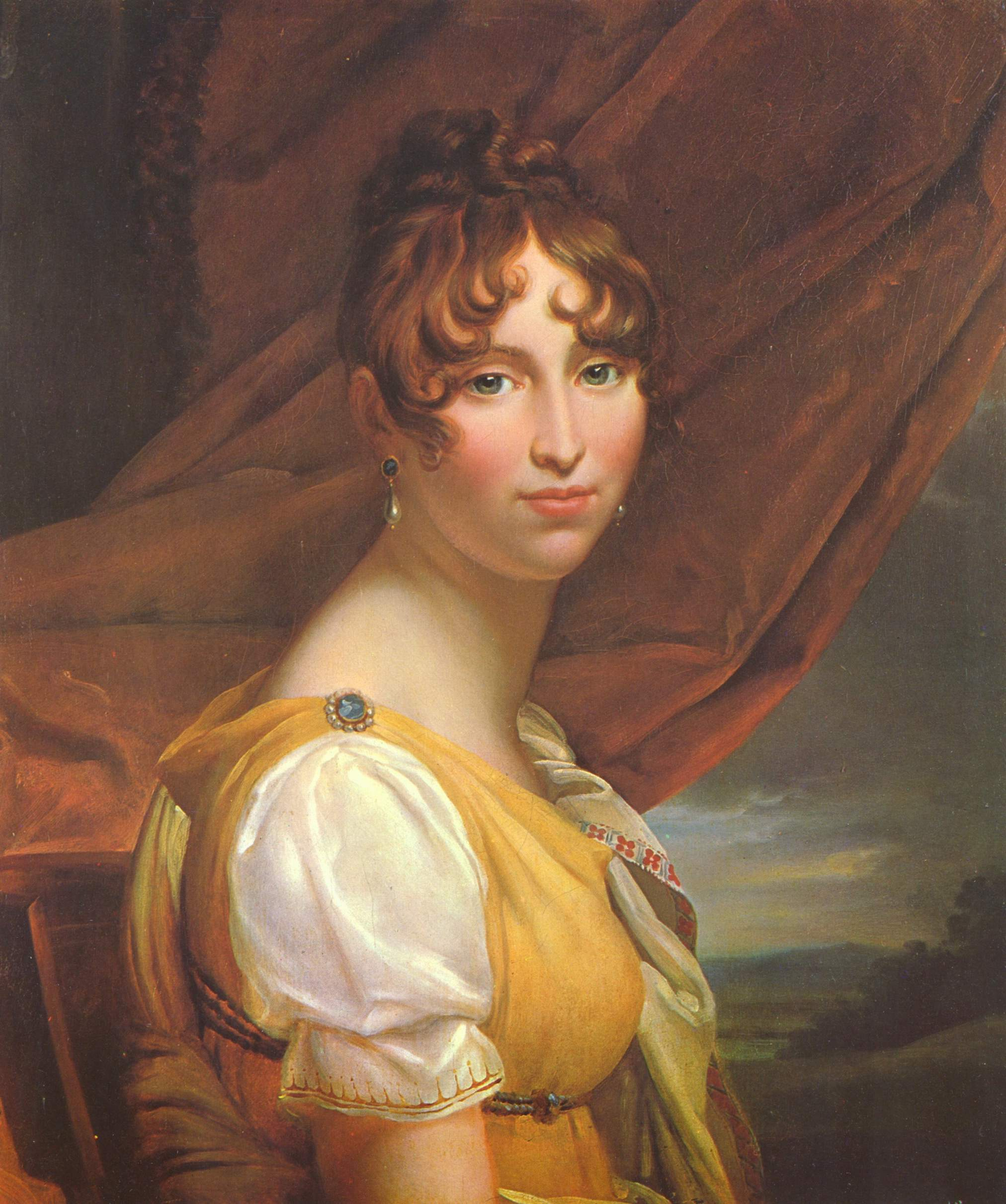
Portrait of Hortense de Beauharnais

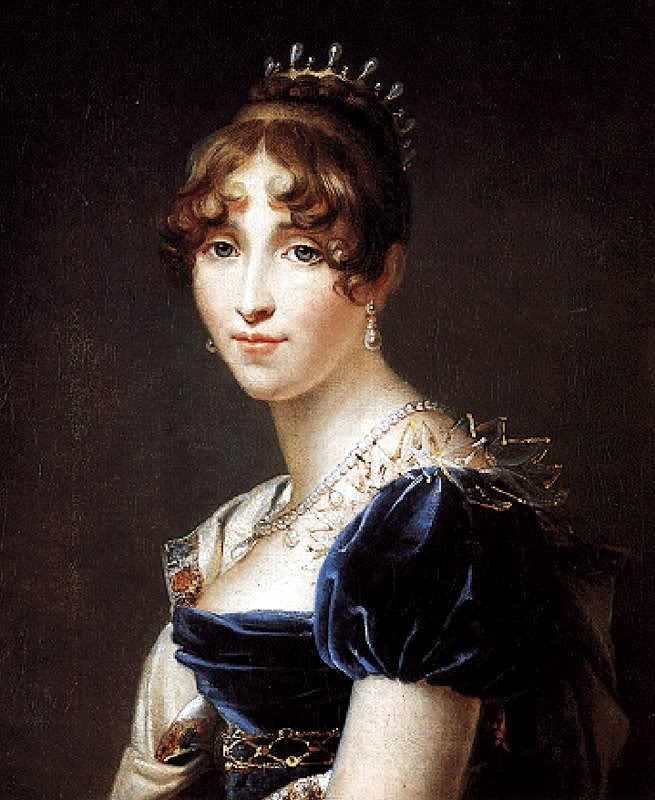
Portrait of Hortense de Beauharnais

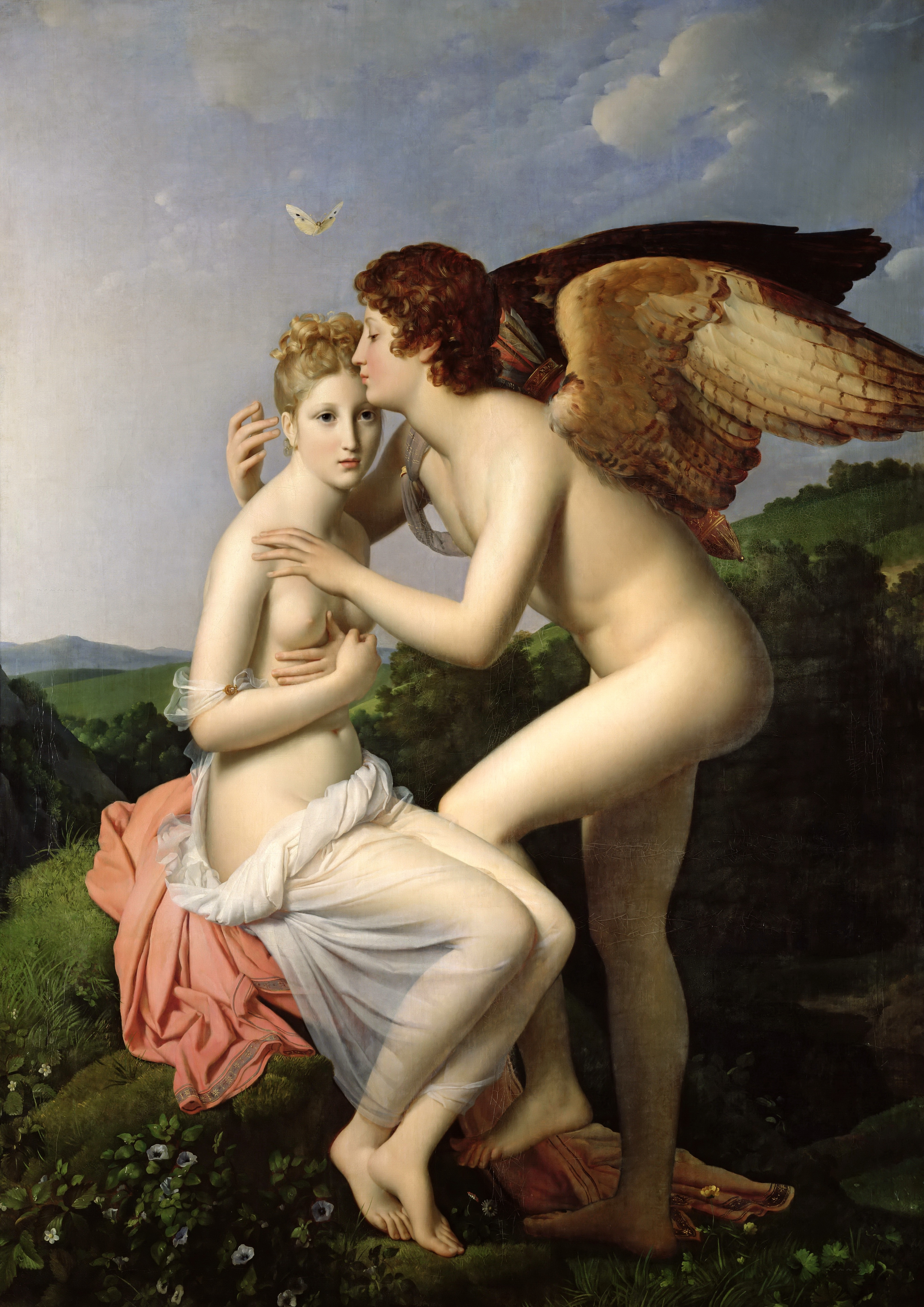
Cupid and Psyche

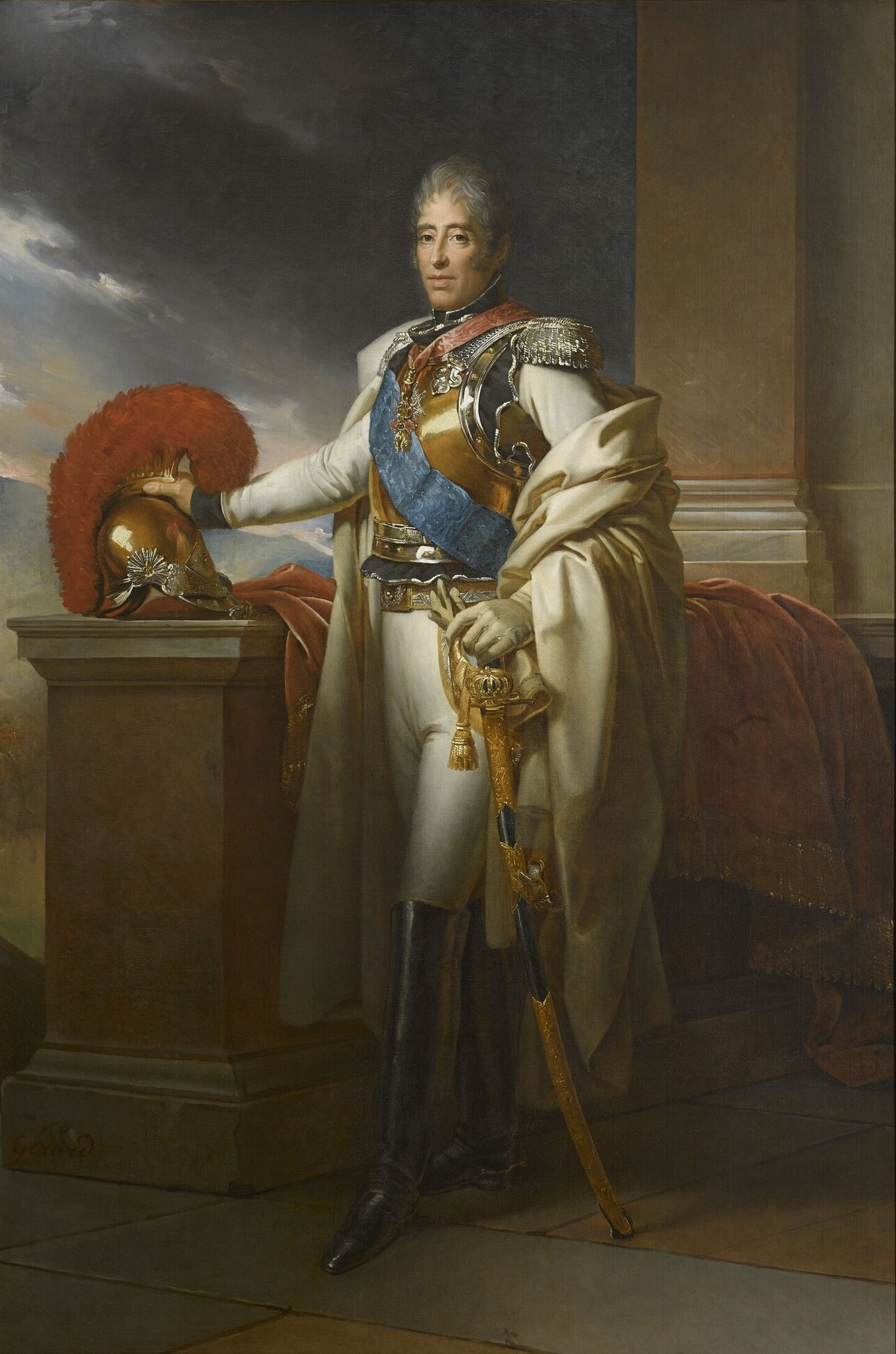
Portrait of the Count of Artois, 1815

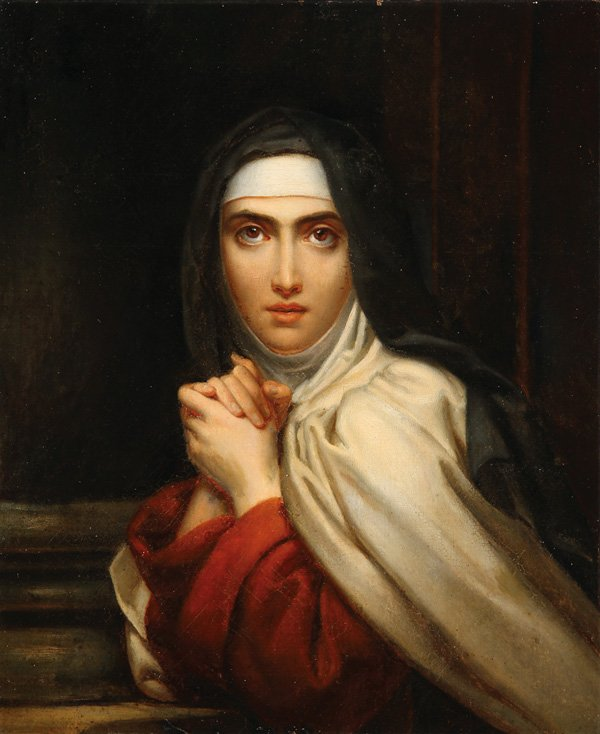
Teresa of Ávila

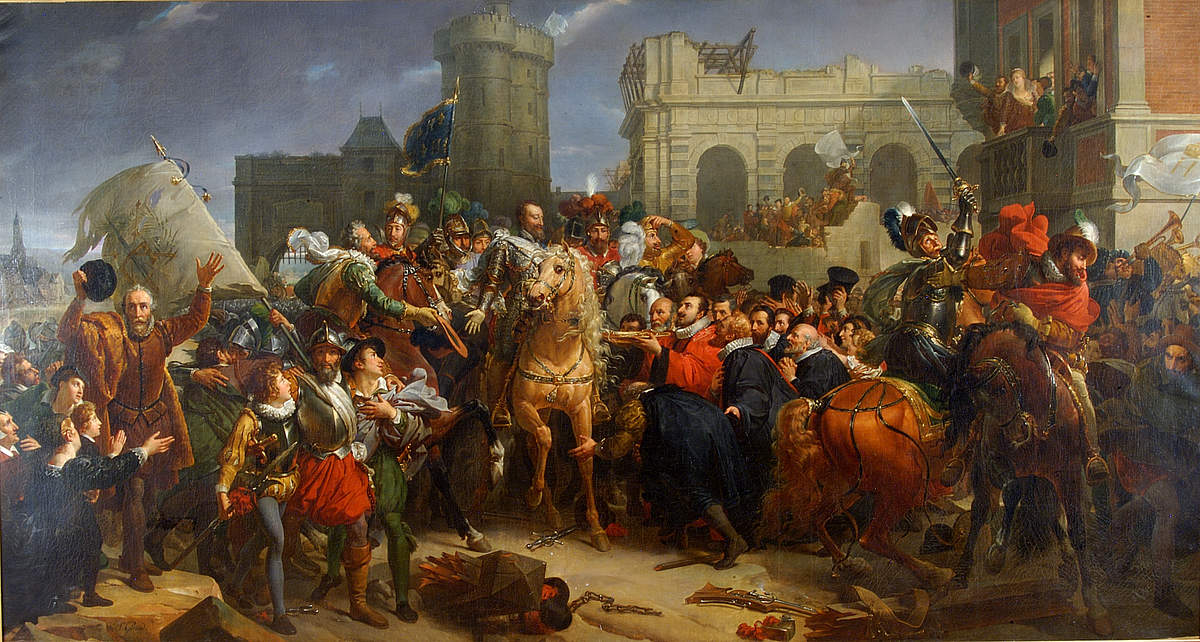
Entry of Henry IV into Paris, 1817

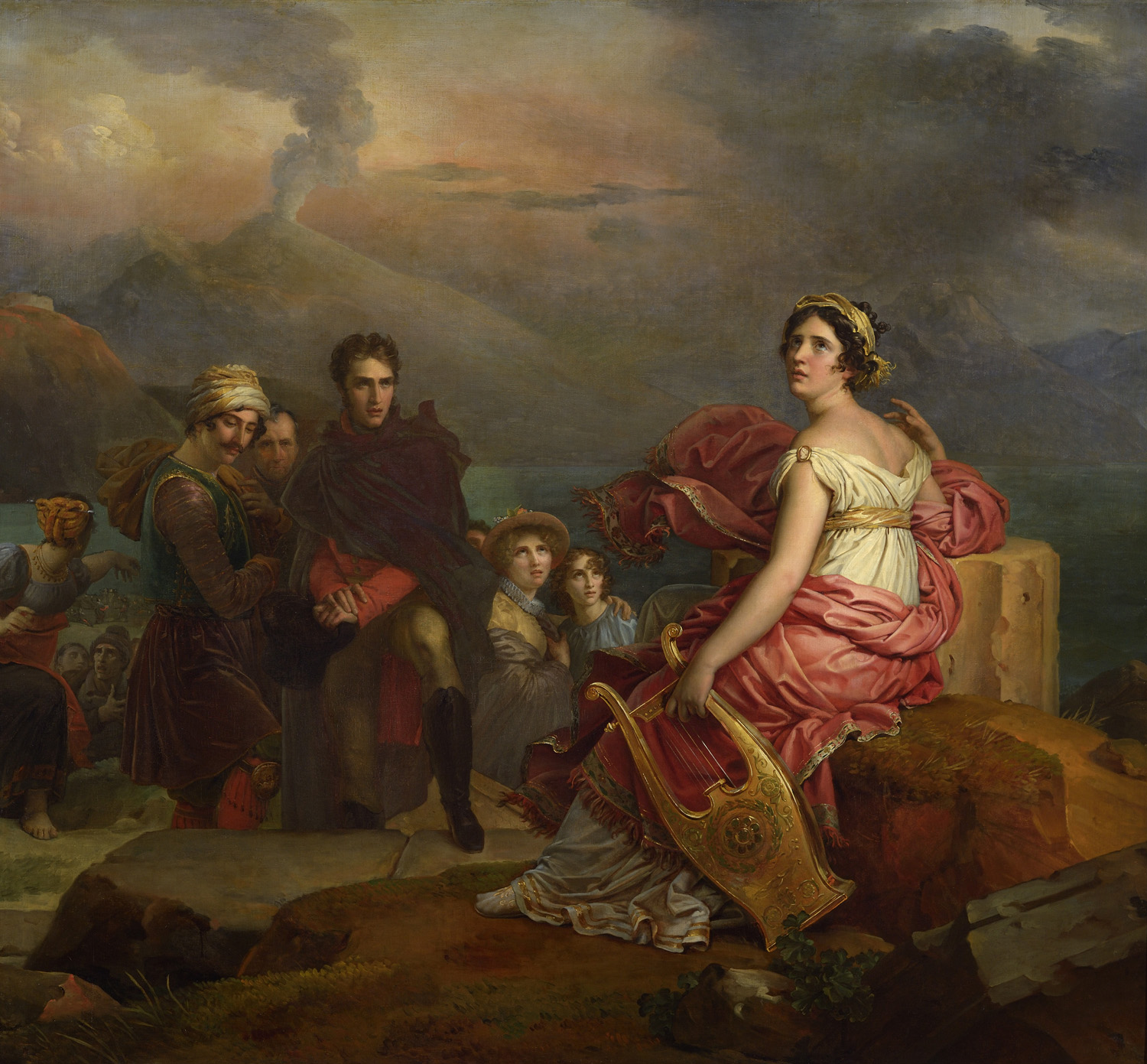
Corinne at Cape Misenum, 1819–1821, Musée des Beaux-Arts de Lyon

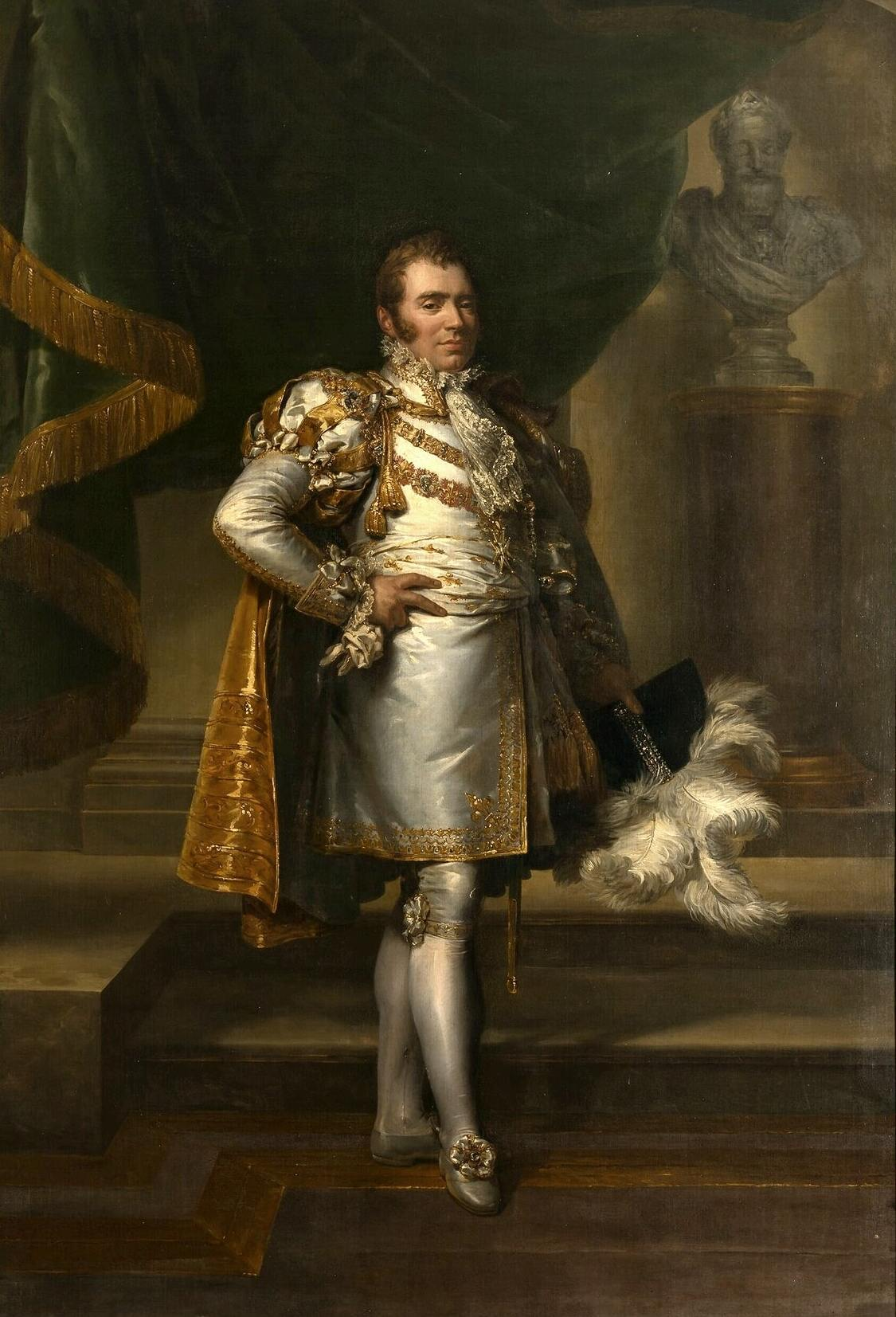
Portrait of the Duke of Berry, 1820

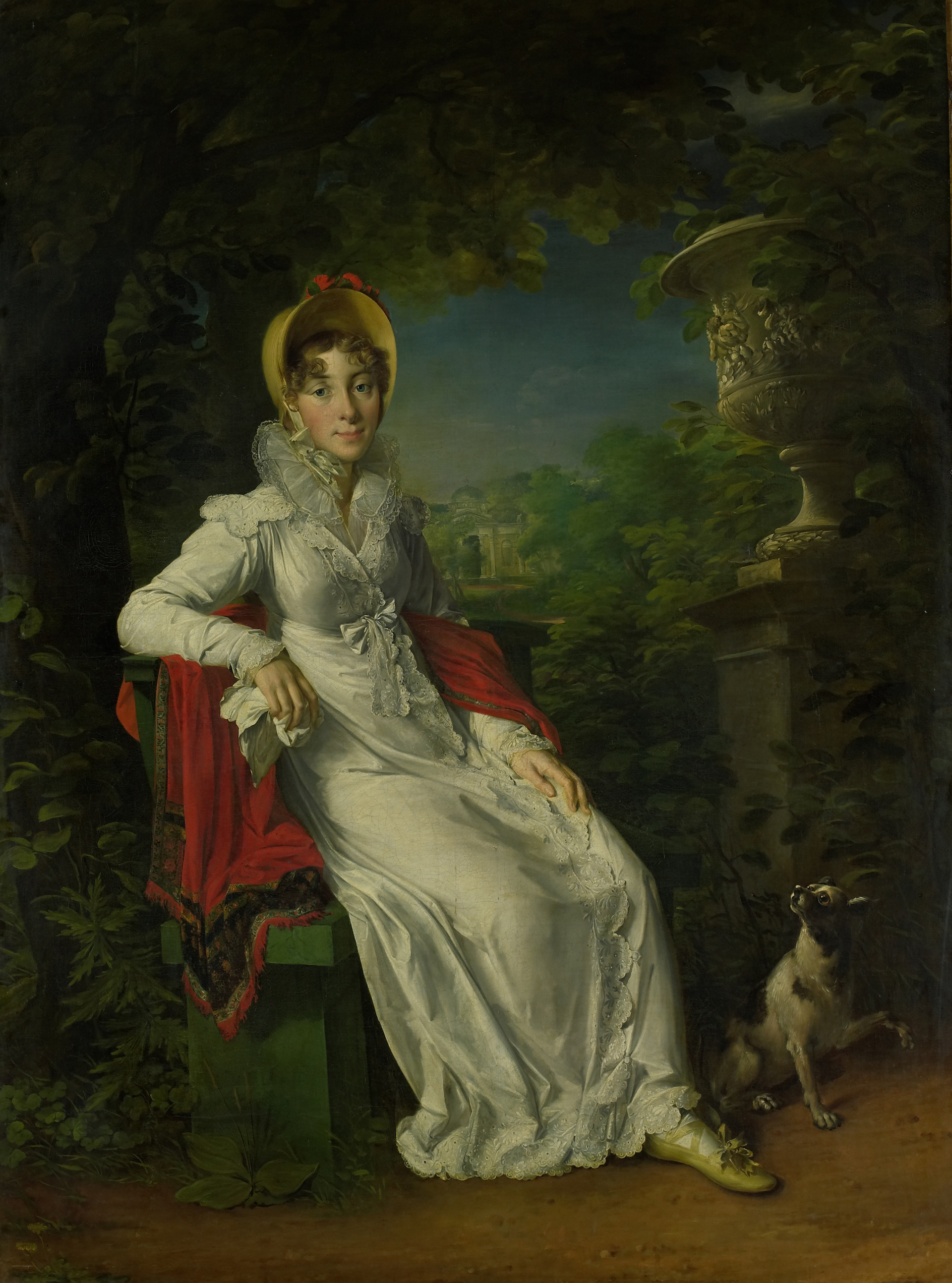
Duchess of Berry, 1820

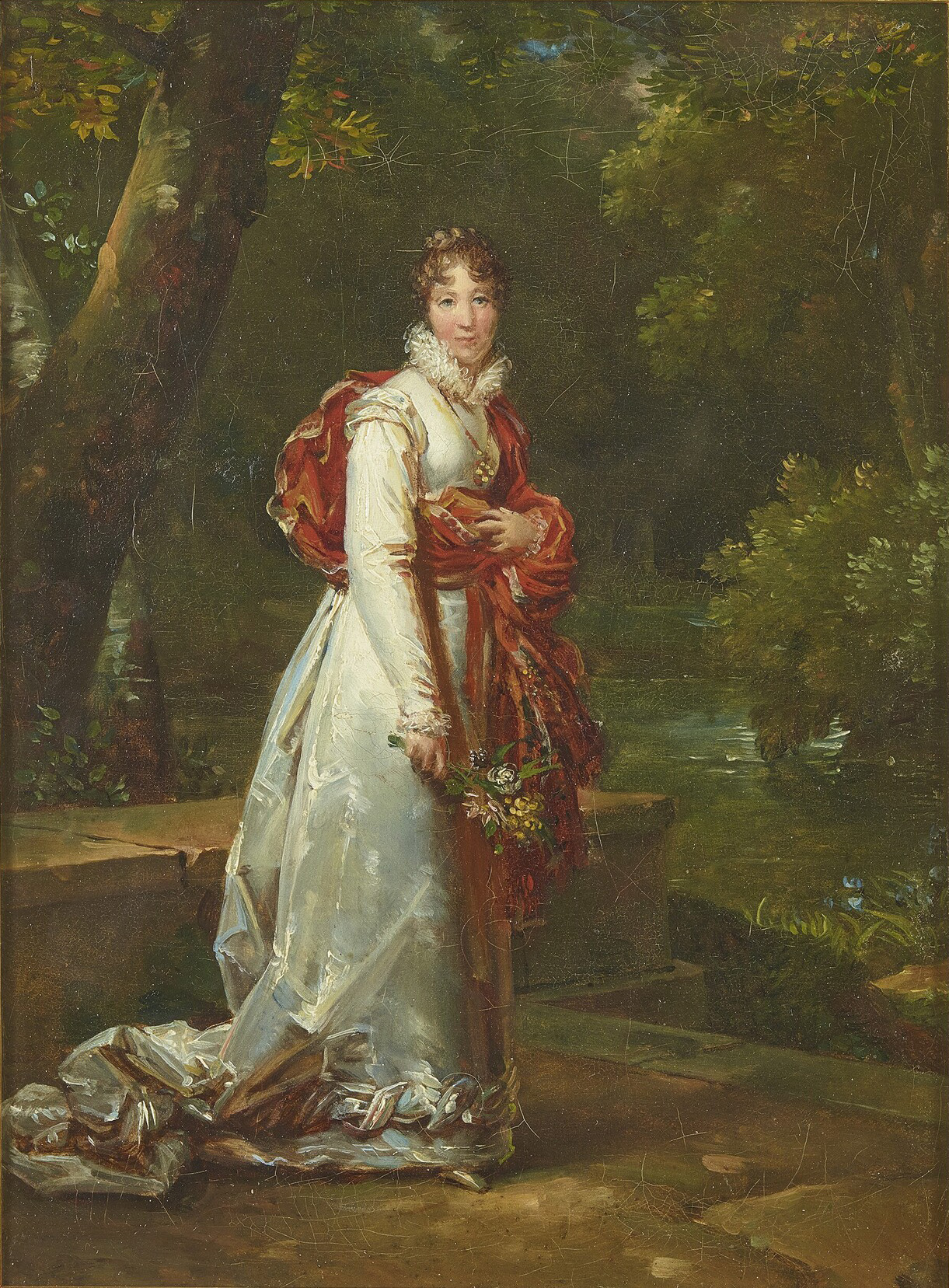
Adelaide of Orleans, 1821

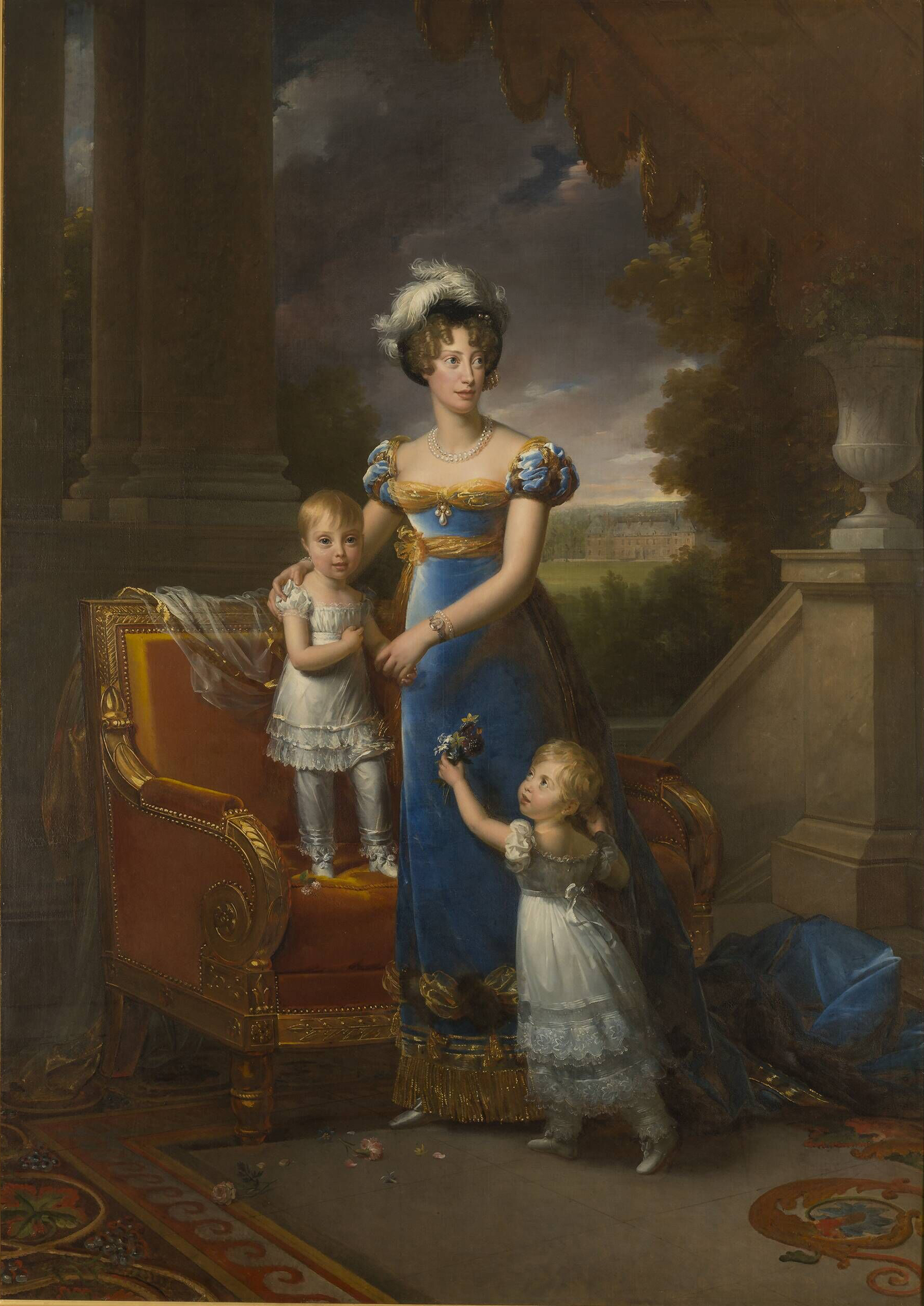
The Duchess of Berry and Her Children, 1822

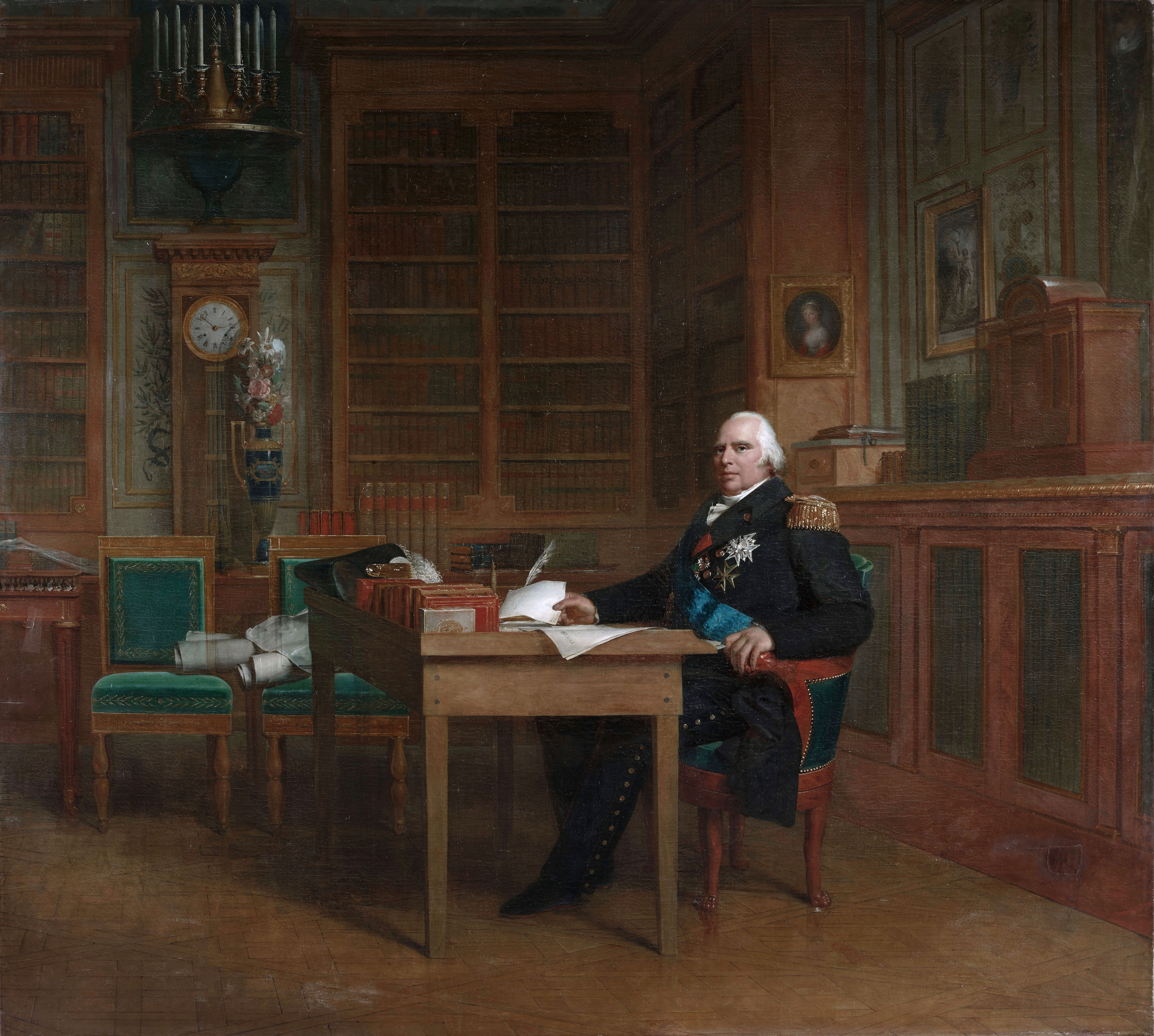
Louis XVIII in his Study, 1823

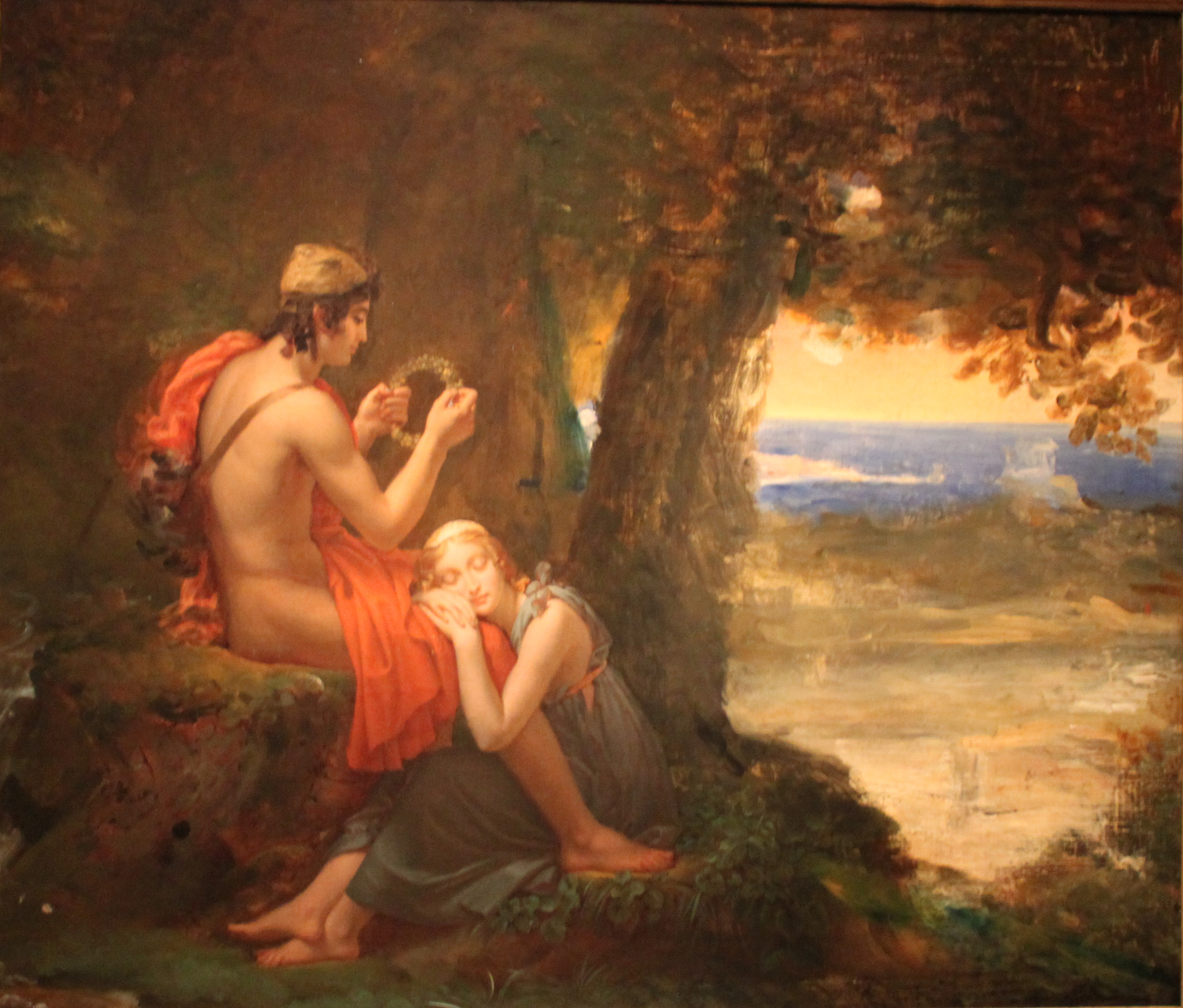
Daphnis and Chloe, c. 1824, oil on canvas, The Detroit Institute of Arts

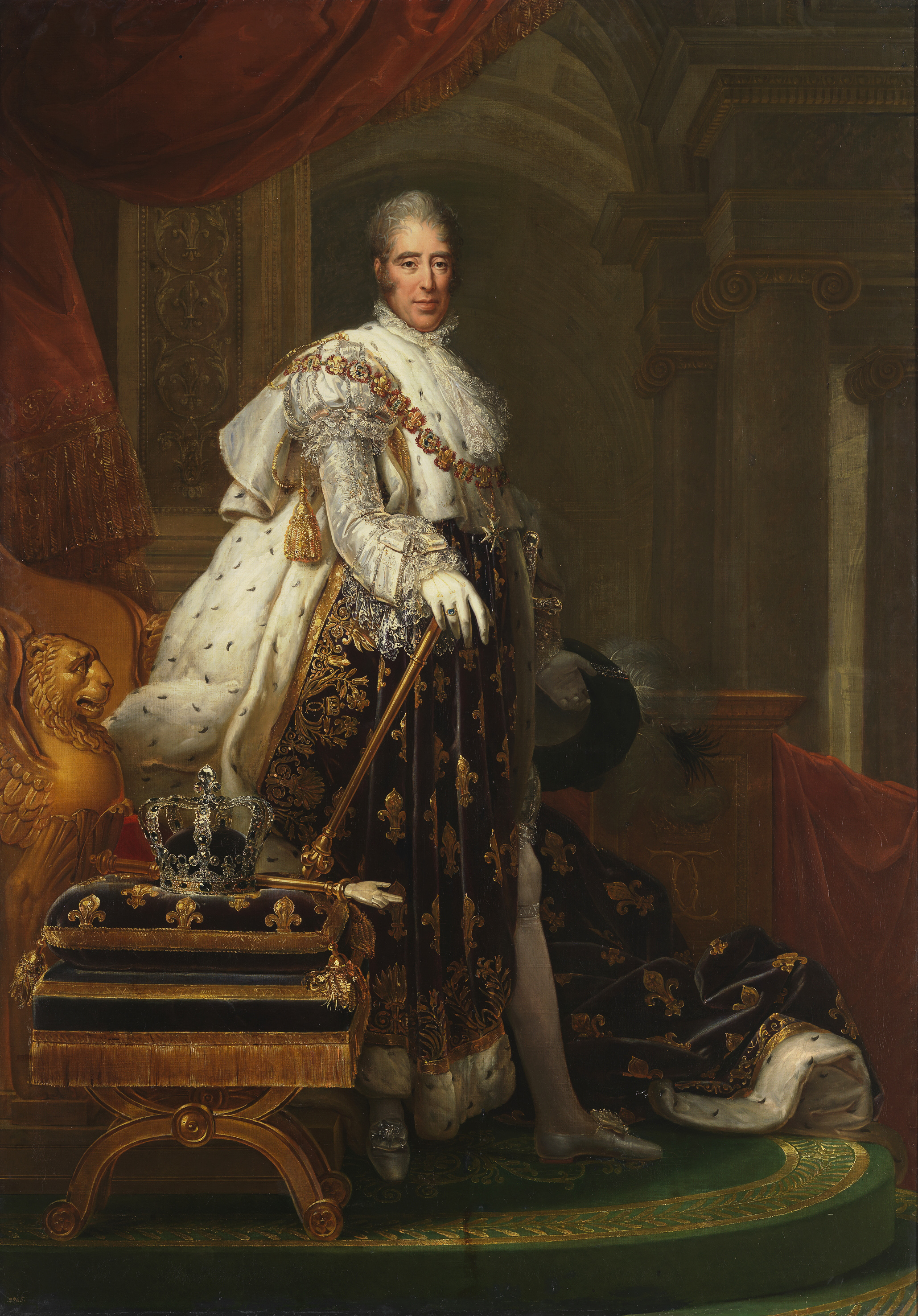
Portrait of Charles X, 1825

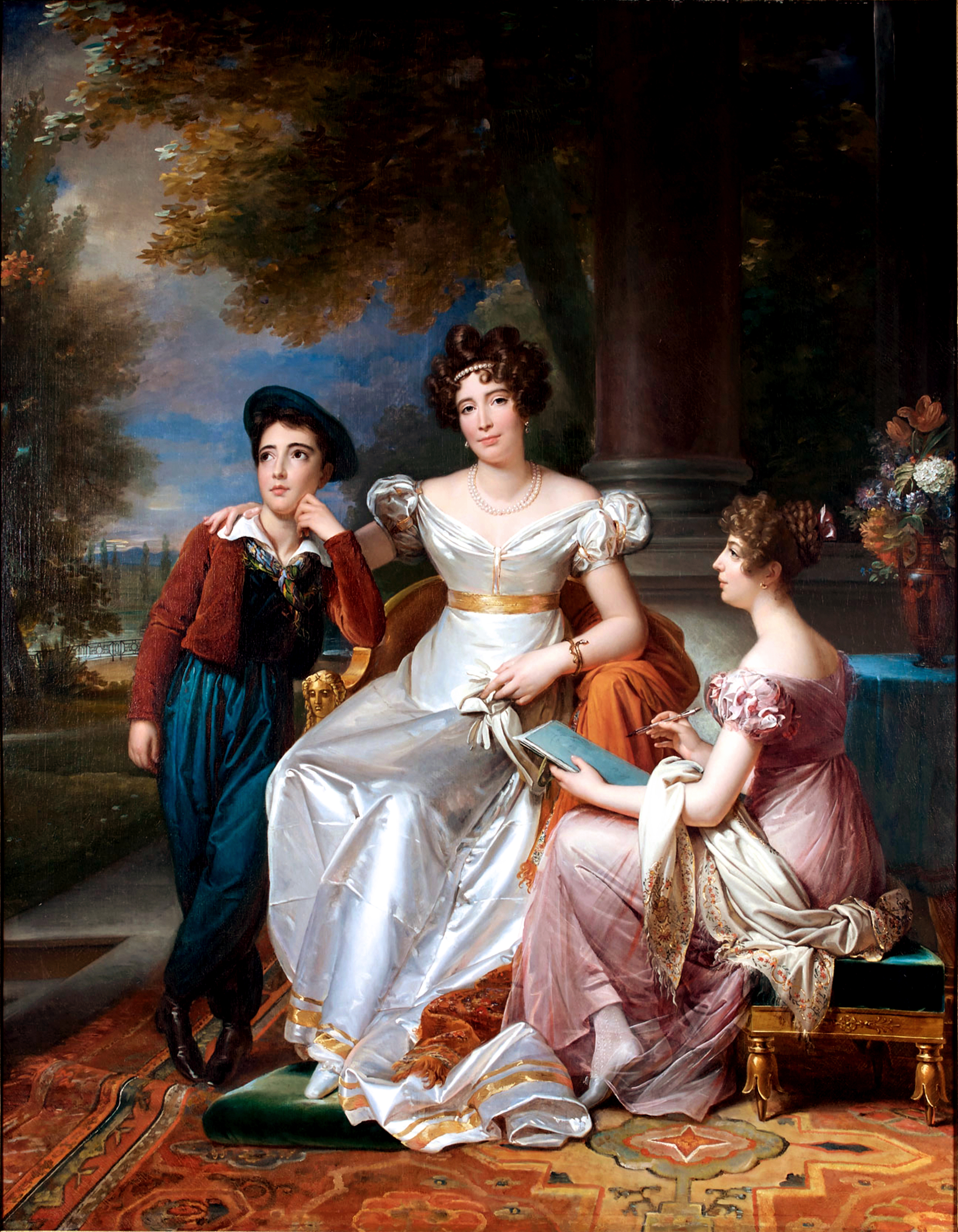
Zoé Talon and her Children, 1825

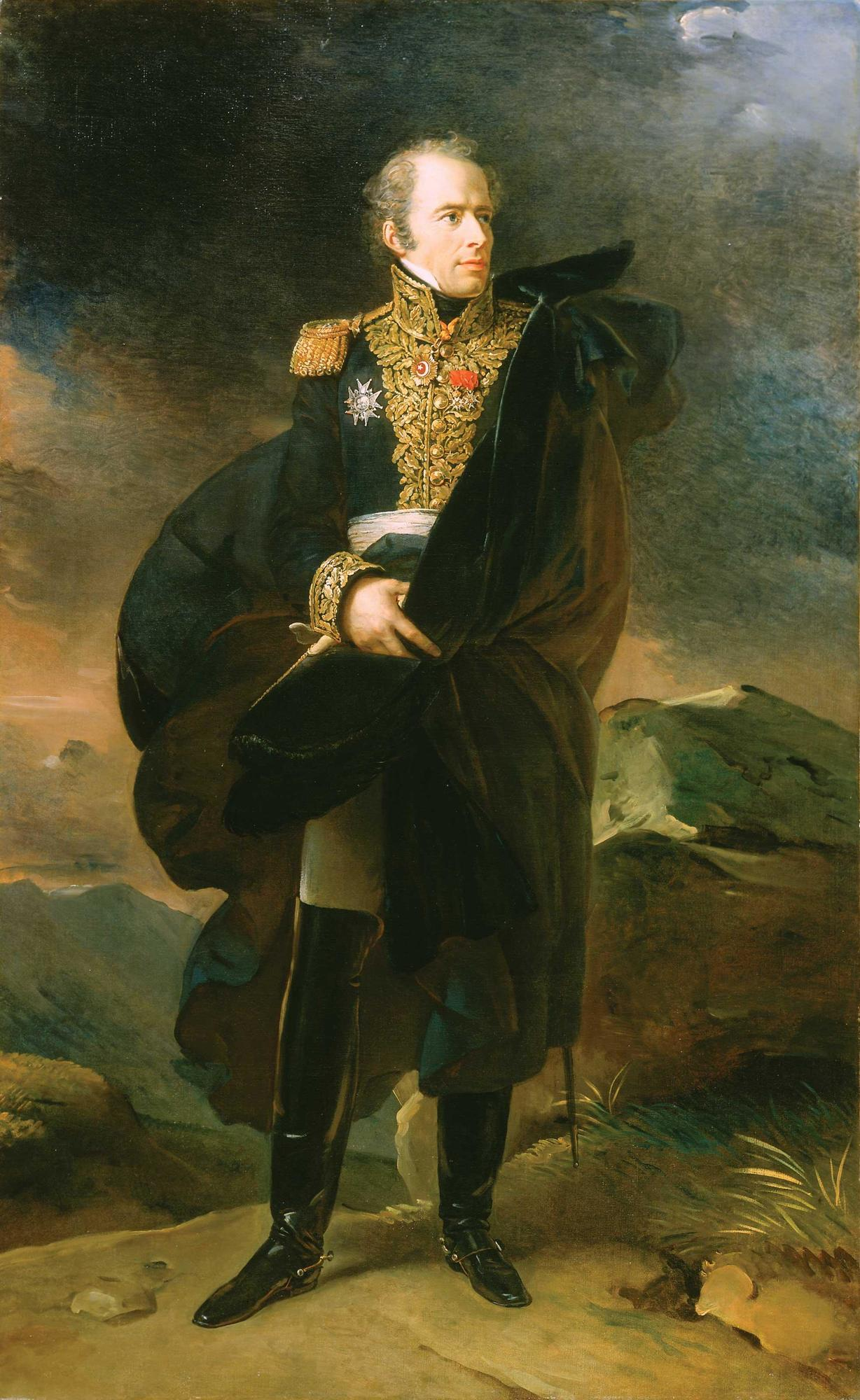
Maximilien Sébastien Foy, 1826

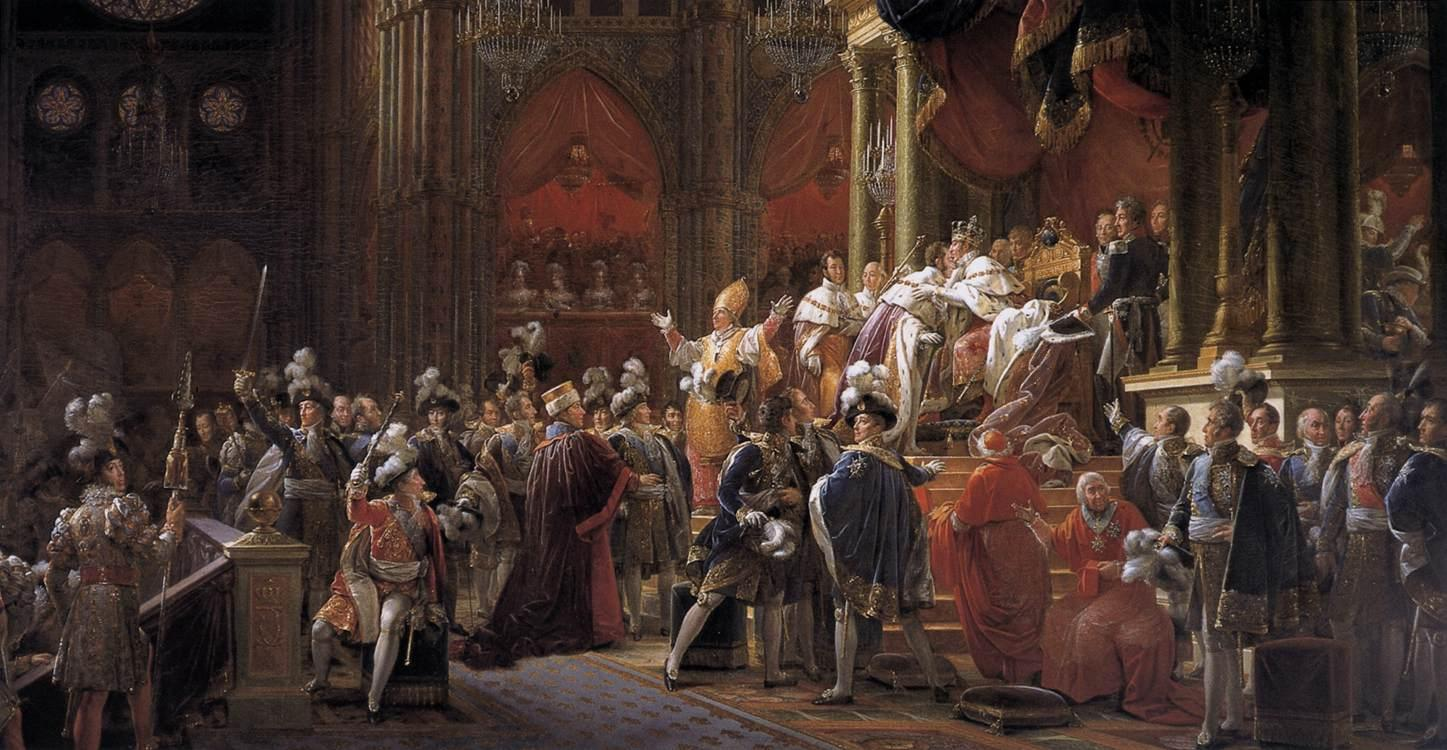
The Coronation of Charles X, 1827

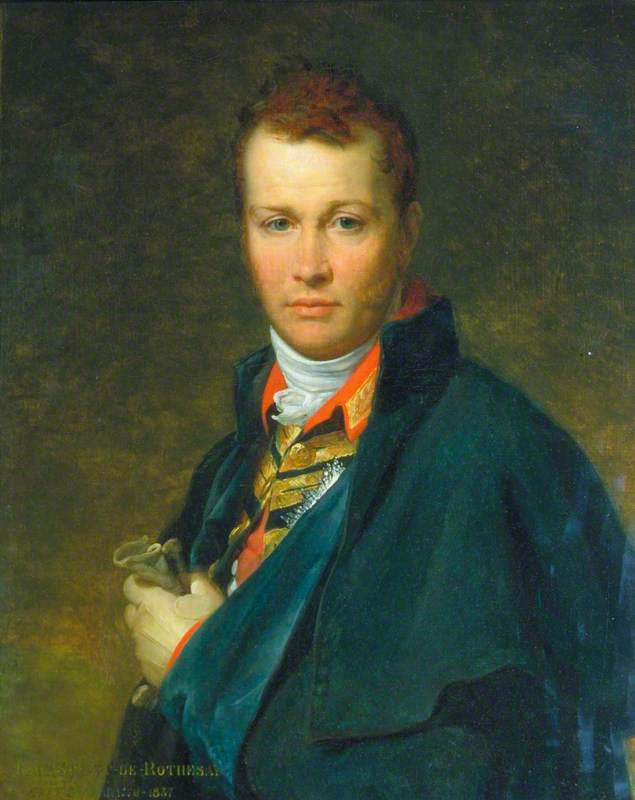
Lord Stuart de Rothesay, 1829

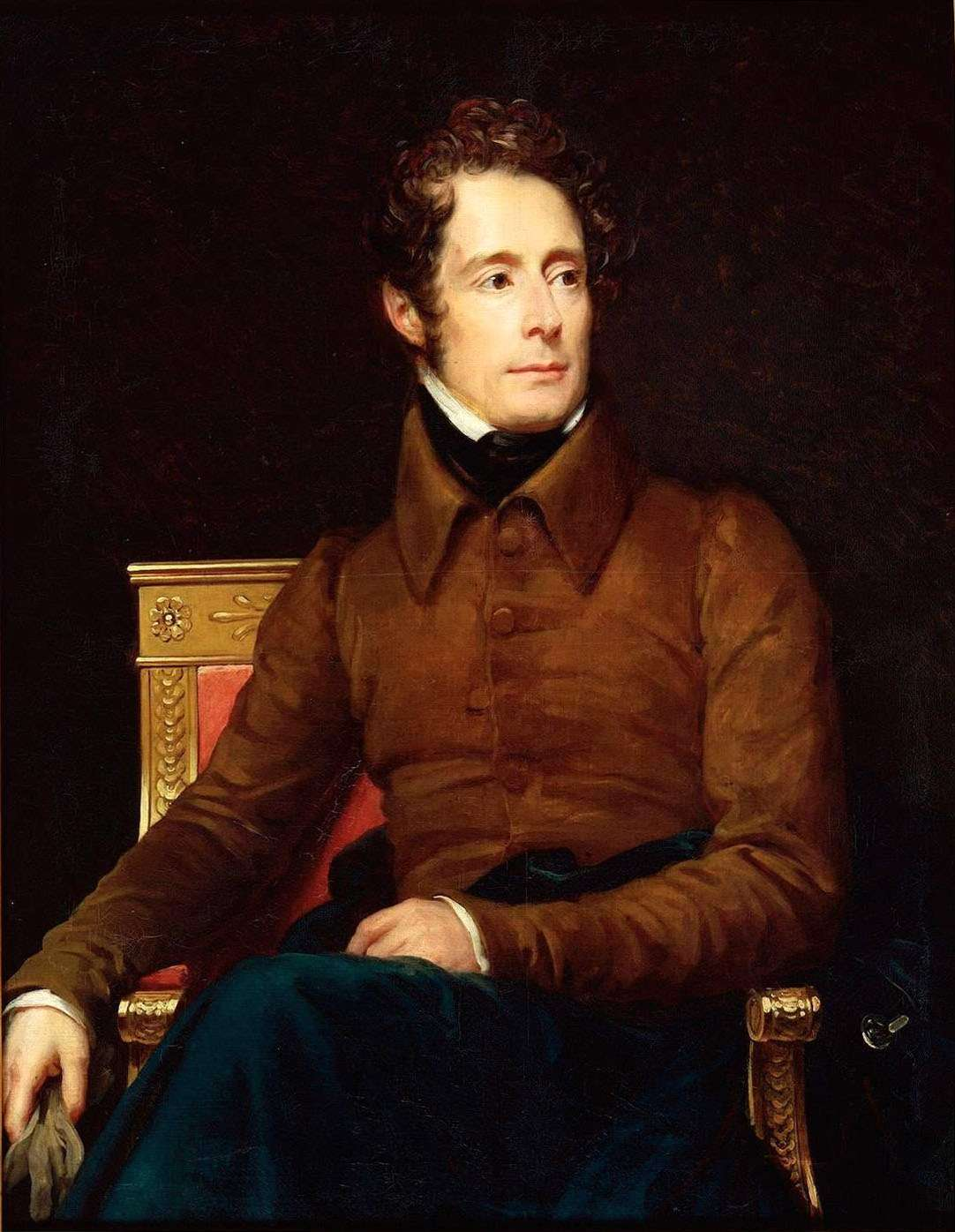
Portrait of Alphonse de Lamartine, 1831

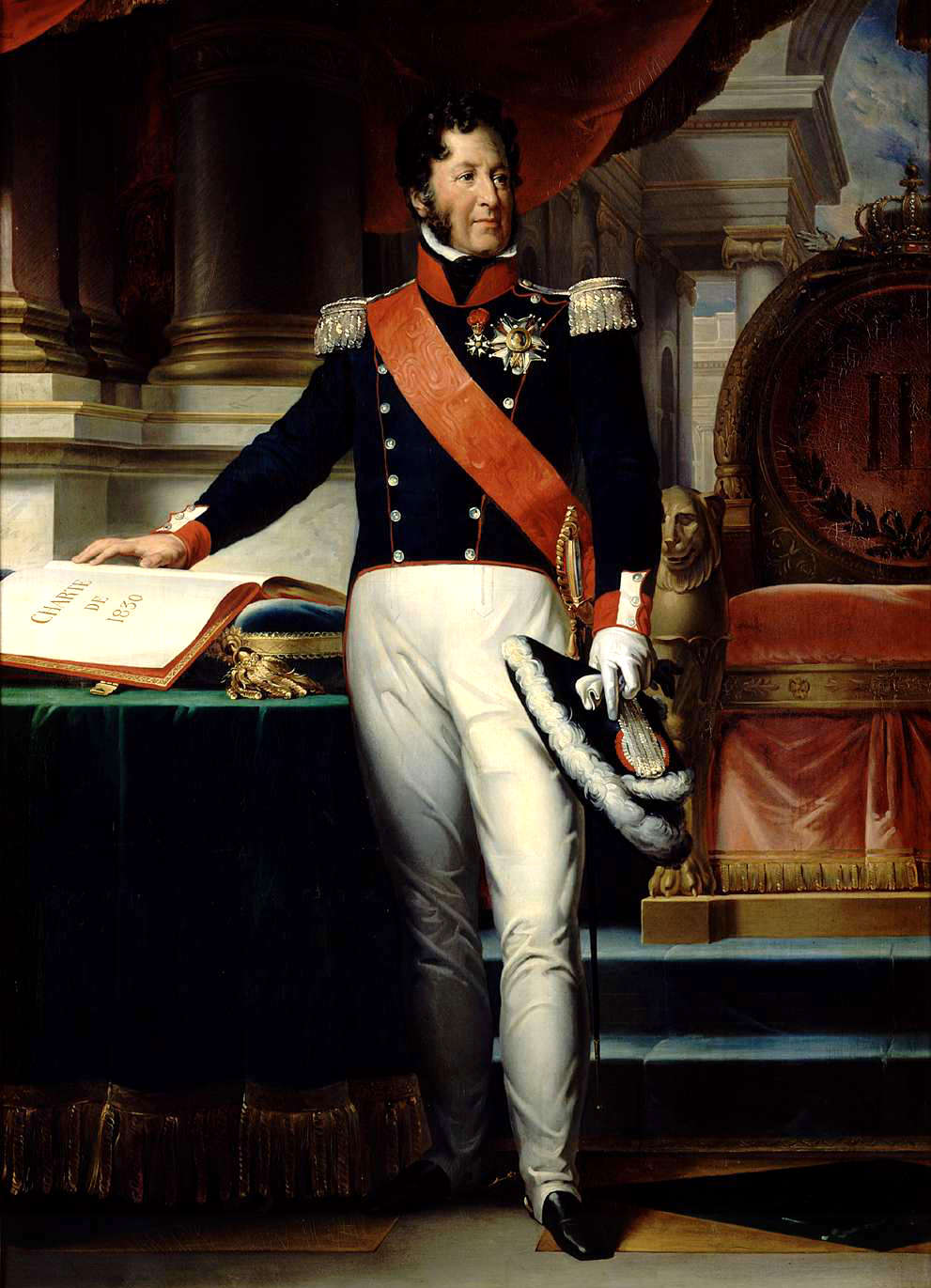
Portrait of Louis Phillippe I, 1834

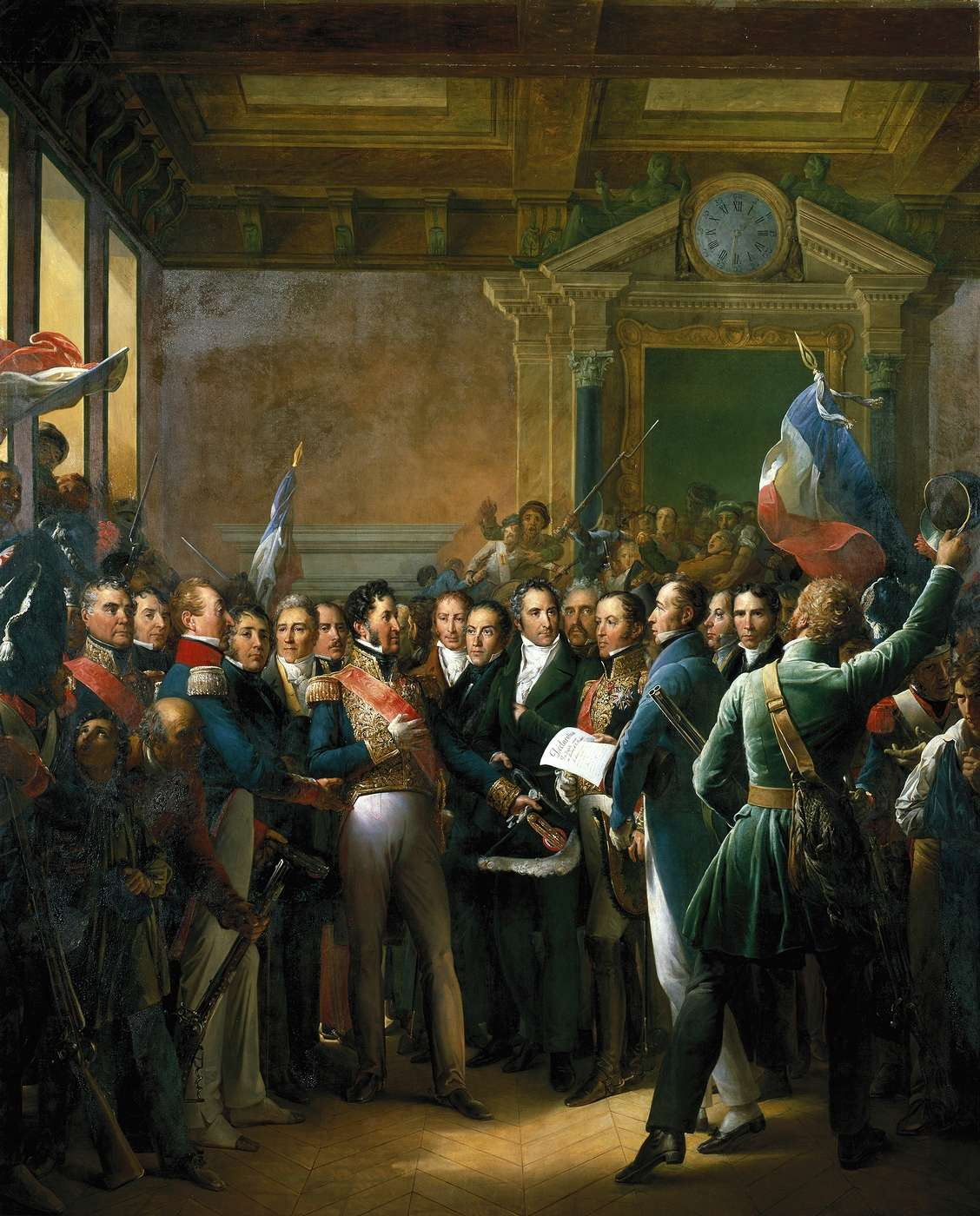
The Reading of the Declaration of the Deputies, 1836

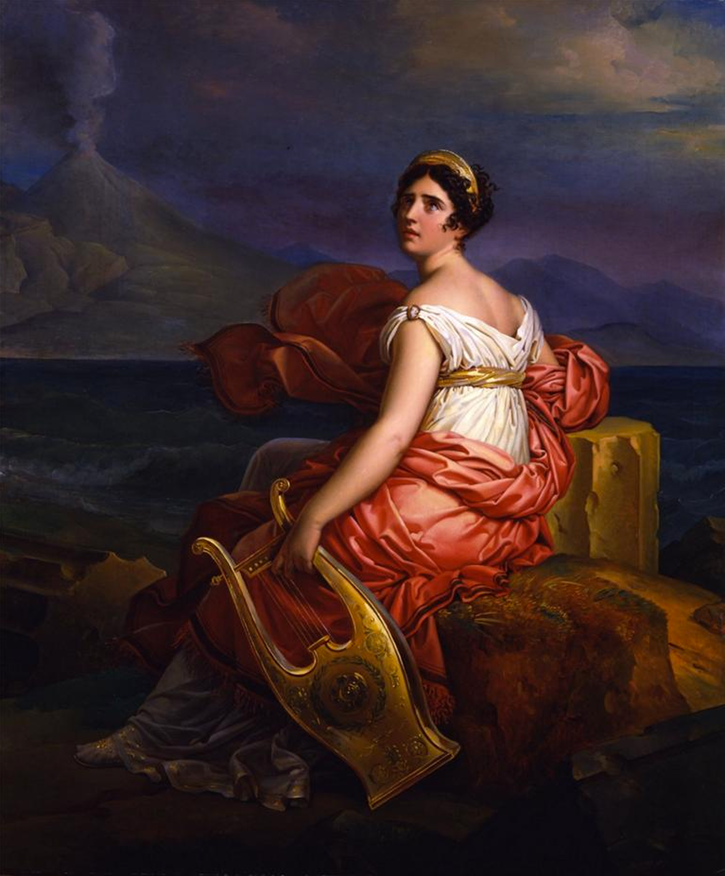
Mme de Staël as her character Corinne (posthumously)

== See also ==
- Neoclassicism in France
