= 1798 in art =

Events from the year 1798 in art.

== Events ==
- English painter Robert Smirke begins to produce The Seven Ages of Man series for the Boydell Shakespeare Gallery.
- 19 November - The Rijksmuseum was founded in The Hague.

== Works ==
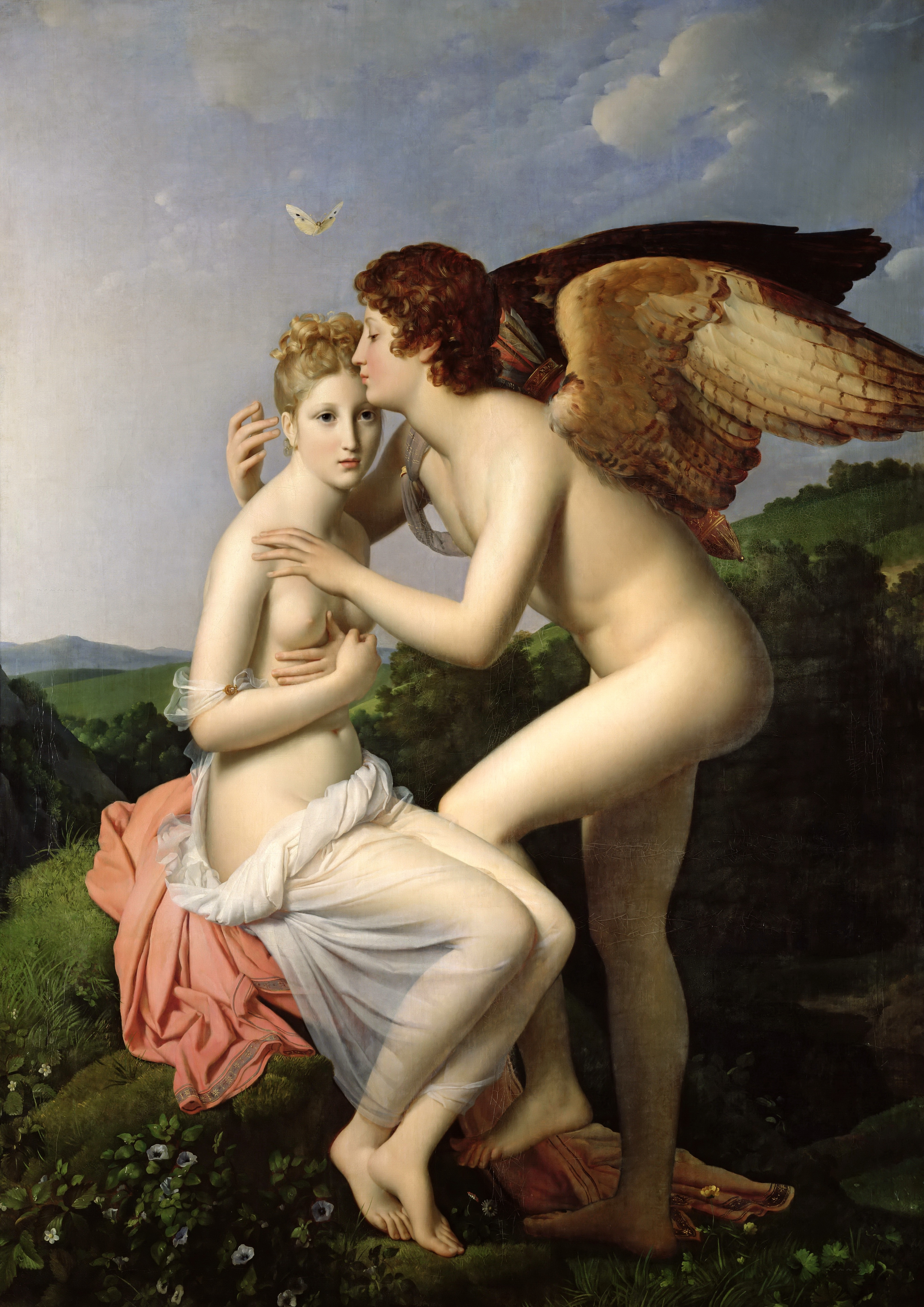
Cupid and Psyche by François Gérard

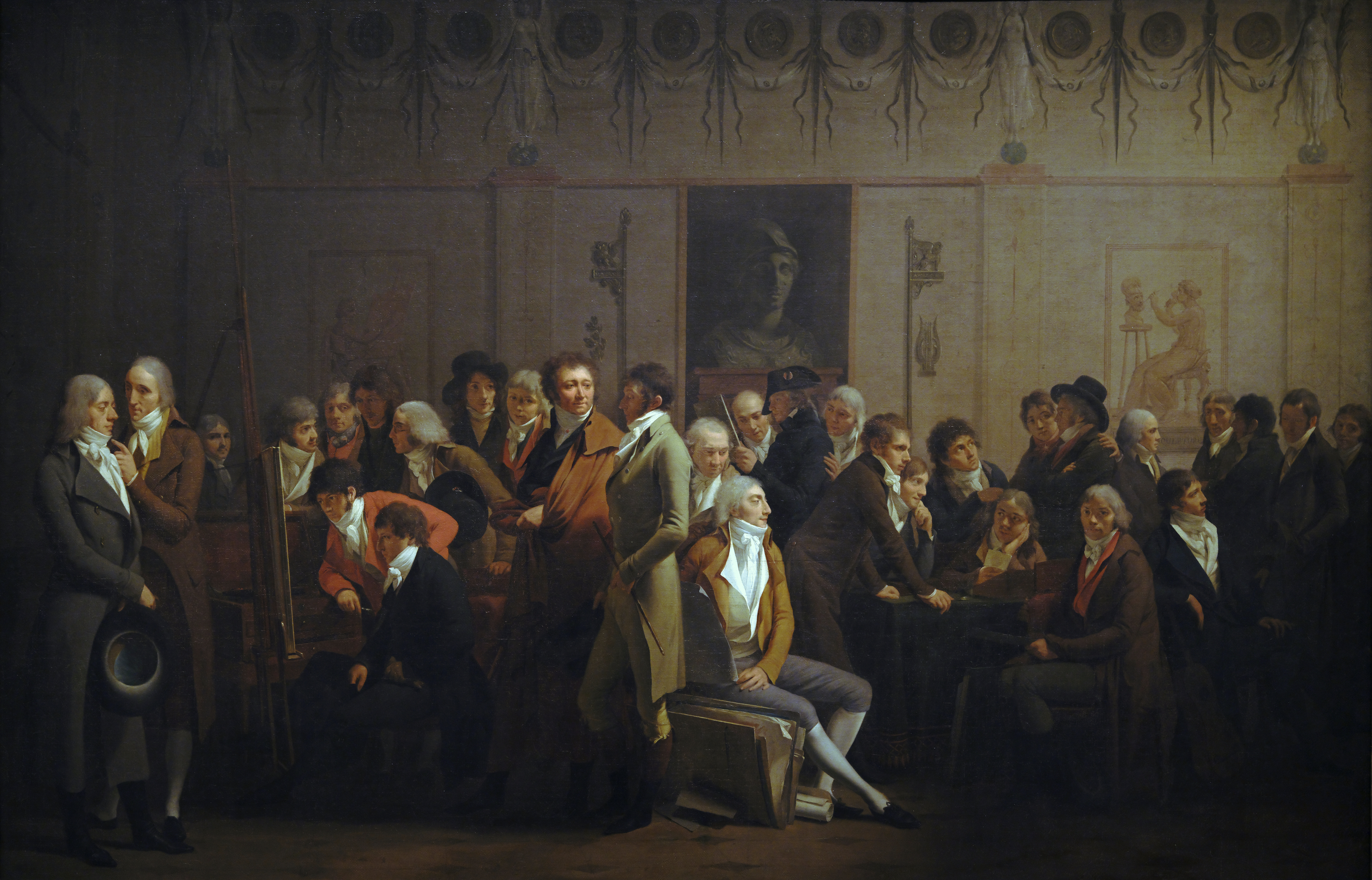
Meeting of Artists in Isabey's Studio by Louis-Léopold Boilly

- William Beechey
  - George III and the Prince of Wales Reviewing Troops
  - Portrait of Thomas Hope
  - Portrait of George, Prince of Wales
- Louis-Léopold Boilly – Meeting of Artists in Isabey's Studio
- John Singleton Copley – Portrait of Henry Addington
- François Gérard – Cupid and Psyche
- Anne-Louis Girodet de Roussy-Trioson – Jean-Baptiste Belley
- Francisco Goya
  - Gaspar Melchor de Jovellanos (approximate date)
  - Witches' Sabbath
- Antoine-Jean Gros – Le pont d'Arcole
- Thomas Lawrence
  - Caroline, Princess of Wales
  - John Philip Kemble as Coriolanus
- John Opie – Portrait of Amelia Opie
- Charles Thévenin – General Augereau at the Bridge of Arcole
- J.M.W. Turner
  - Dunstanburgh Castle
  - Kilgarren Castle
- François-André Vincent – The Ploughing Lesson
- Thomas Whitcombe – The Battle of Camperdown, 11 October 1797

== Births ==
- January 8 – John Graham Lough, English sculptor known for his funerary monuments and a variety of portrait sculpture (died 1876)
- January 9 – Philippe Joseph Henri Lemaire, French sculptor (died 1880)
- February 17 – Josef Matěj Navrátil, Czech painter of paintings, murals and frescos (died 1865)
- March – David Hay, Scottish-born interior decorator (died 1866)
- March 12 – Elizabeth Goodridge, American painter specializing in miniatures (died 1882)
- April 26 – Eugène Delacroix, French Romantic painter (died 1863)
- June 22 – Ditlev Blunck, Danish painter (died 1854)
- July 16 – Abbondio Sangiorgio, Italian sculptor (died 1879)
- July 29 – Carl Blechen, German painter specializing in fantastic landscapes with demons and grotesque figures (died 1840)
- September 28 – Charles-Philippe Larivière, French academic painter and lithographer (died 1876)
- October 13 – Herman Wilhelm Bissen, Danish sculptor (died 1868)
- October 24 – Massimo d'Azeglio, Italian statesman, novelist and painter (died 1866)
- November 29 – Alexander Brullov, Russian painter, teacher and architect (died 1877)
- December 8 – Antoine Laurent Dantan, French academic sculptor (died 1878)
- date unknown
  - John Cart Burgess, English watercolour painter of flowers and landscapes (died 1863)
  - Jean Henri De Coene, Belgian painter of genre and historical subjects (died 1866)
  - Konstantin Danil, Serbian painter (died 1873)
  - William Egley, English miniature painter (died 1870)
  - James Eights, American scientist and watercolour painter (died 1882)
  - Thomas Foster, Irish portrait painter (died 1826)
  - James Duffield Harding, English landscape painter (died 1863)
  - Demeter Laccataris, Austro-Hungarian portrait painter of Greek origin (died 1864)
  - Henry O'Neill, Irish illustrator and archaeologist (died 1880)
  - Robert Seymour, English illustrator (suicide 1836)
  - Rafael Stupin, Russian painter (died 1860s)
  - Henry Bryan Ziegler, British landscape and portrait painter (died 1874)

== Deaths ==
- January 4 – Gavin Hamilton, Scottish neoclassical history painter (born 1723)
- January 25 – Christopher Unterberger, Italian painter of the early-Neoclassical period (born 1732)
- February 9 – Antoine de Favray, French-born portrait painter (born 1706)
- May 25 – Asmus Jacob Carstens, Danish-German (born 1754)
- May 27 – Franciszek Pinck, Polish sculptor and stucco artist (born 1733)
- August 28 – Charles Catton, English painter (born 1728)
- October 30 – Anton Hickel, Bohemian painter (born 1745)
- December 8 – Richard Newton, English caricaturist, of typhus (born 1777)
- date unknown
  - Giuseppe Angeli, Venetian painter of the late-baroque (born 1709)
  - Christopher Hewetson, Irish sculptor (born c. 1737)
  - Innocenzo Spinazzi, sculptor (born 1726)
  - Mikhail Shibanov, Russian painter (b. unknown)
  - Vincenzio Vangelisti, Italian engraver (born 1740)
