= 1793 in art =

Events from the year 1793 in art.

== Events ==
- April 29 – The Royal Academy Exhibition of 1793 opens at Somerset House in London
- August 10 – The Louvre in Paris opens to the public as an art museum, with 537 paintings.
- Henry Fuseli begins to paints scenes from Paradise Lost.
- Aleksander Orłowski joins the Polish army; this leads to his participation in the Kościuszko Uprising.

== Works ==
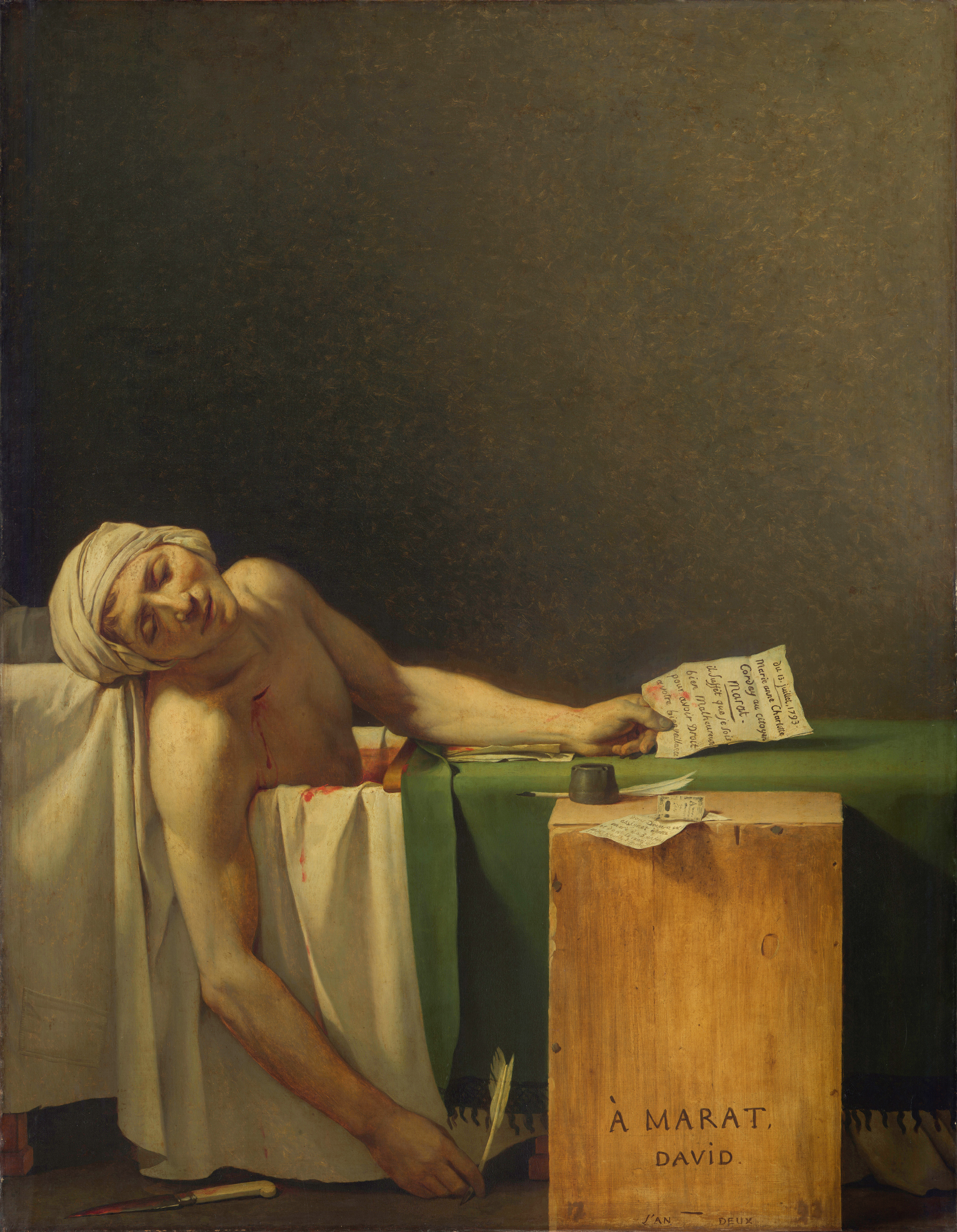
Jacques-Louis David, The Death of Marat (1793)

- William Beechey
  - Sir Francis Ford's Children Giving a Coin to a Beggar Boy
  - Sarah Siddons with the Emblems of Tragedy
- William Blake – For Children: The Gates of Paradise (engravings)
- Mather Brown – Louis XVI Saying Farewell to His Family
- Antonio Canova – Psyche Revived by Cupid's Kiss (marble statue, 1st version, commissioned 1787, enters Louvre 1824)
- Jacques-Louis David – The Death of Marat
- Francisco Goya – Attack on a Coach
- Pierre-Narcisse Guérin – The Death of Brutus
- Thomas Lawrence – Portrait of Sir Francis Burdett
- Philip James de Loutherbourg – The Shipwreck
- George Morland – A Farrier's Shop
- John Opie – Boadicea Haranguing the Britons
- George Stubbs – The Prince of Wales's Phaeton
- François Marie Suzanne – terra cotta figure of Benjamin Franklin
- Charles Thévenin – The Storming of the Bastille
- John Trumbull – Portrait of John Adams
- Utamaro – Three Beauties of the Present Day (nishiki-e color woodblock print; approximate date)

== Births ==
- January 15 – Ferdinand Georg Waldmüller, Austrian painter and writer (died 1865)
- February 13 – Philipp Veit, German Romantic painter (died 1887)
- June 1 – Augustus Earle, English artist (died 1838)
- June 3 – Edmund Thomas Parris, English history, portrait, subject, and panorama painter, book illustrator, designer and art restorer (died 1873)
- July 19 – Thomas Doughty, American landscape painter (died 1856)
- August 3 – Jacques-Jean Barre, French engraver and designer of French medals, the Great Seal of France, bank notes and postage stamps (died 1855)
- October 11 – Johan Erik Lindh, Swedish painter and former decorative painter who moved to Finland (died 1865)
- November 3 – Thomas Ender, Austrian painter (died 1875)
- November 5 – Antoine Maurin, French lithographer (died 1860)
- November 16 – Francis Danby, Irish landscape painter from the south of Ireland (died 1861)
- November 17 – Charles Lock Eastlake, English painter and art collector (died 1865)
- November 25 – Robert Havell, Jr., English principal engraver of Audubon's The Birds of America (died 1878)
- December 3 – Clarkson Frederick Stanfield, English marine painter (died 1867)
- December 7 – Joseph Severn, English portrait and subject painter (died 1879)
- date unknown
  - Henry Perronet Briggs, English portrait and historical painter (died 1844)
  - Margaret Sarah Carpenter, née Geddes, English portrait painter (died 1872)
  - Erin Corr, Irish engraver (died 1862)
  - Angelus de Baets, Belgian painter of portraits and architectural subjects (died 1855)
  - Luo Bingzhang, Han Chinese official, military general, calligrapher and devout Confucian scholar (died 1867)
  - Jacobus Josephus Eeckhout, Belgian historical and genre subject painter (died 1861)
  - Jean-Antoine-Siméon Fort, French artist painting in oil and watercolours (died 1861)
  - Václav Mánes, Czech painter (died 1858)
  - Angélique Mezzara, French portrait painter and miniaturist (died 1868)
  - Boris Orlovsky, Russian sculptor (died 1837)
  - Louis Royer, Austrian Netherlands sculptor (died 1868)
  - Watanabe Kazan, Japanese painter, scholar and statesman (died 1841)

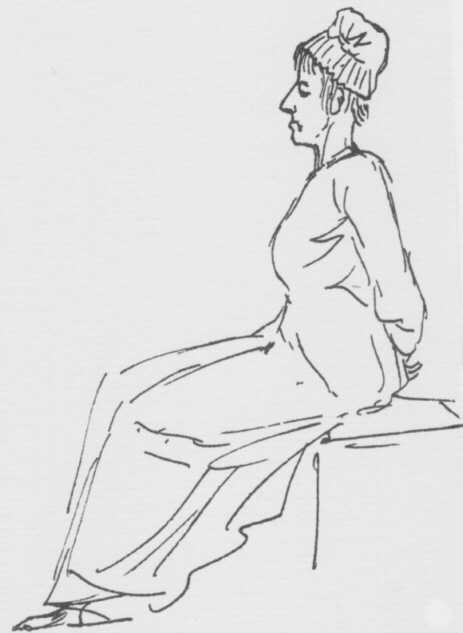
Jacques-Louis David, Marie Antoinette on the way to the guillotine (16 October 1793)

== Deaths ==
- January 1 – Francesco Guardi, Venetian painter of veduta (born 1712)
- March 2 – Carl Gustaf Pilo, Swedish-born painter (born 1711)
- May 15 - Peter Adolf Hall, Swedish-French artist who mainly devoted himself to miniature painting (born 1739)
- May 29 – John Webber, English landscape artist (born 1751)
- July 5
  - Alexander Roslin, Swedish portrait painter (born 1718)
  - Peter Anton von Verschaffelt, Flemish sculptor and architect (born 1710)
- September 9 – Peter Perez Burdett, English draughtsman (born c.1734)
- October 5 – José del Castillo, Spanish painter and a leader of the artistic movement Illustrious Absolutism (born 1737)
- November – Dominic Serres, French-born painter of naval maritime scenes (born 1719)
- November 7 – Per Krafft the Elder, Swedish portrait painter (born 1724)
- November 20 – Teodor Ilić Češljar, Serbian painter of the late Baroque and Rococo period of Vojvodina (born 1746)
- December 13 – Michel-Bruno Bellengé, French painter (born 1726)
- date unknown
  - Ramón Bayeu, Spanish Neoclassicist painter (born 1746)
  - Maria Carowsky, Swedish artist (born 1723)
  - Ignazio Collino, Italian sculptor (born 1724)
  - Hendrik de Meijer, Dutch painter (born 1744)
  - Mauritius Lowe, British painter and engraver (born 1746)
  - Giuseppe Sanmartino, Italian sculptor during the Rococo period (born 1720)
  - Dominic Serres "the Elder", French-born marine painter (born 1722)
  - Antonio González Velázquez, Spanish late-Baroque painter (born 1723)
