= 1746 in art =

Events from the year 1746 in art.

== Events ==
- The Venetian painter Canaletto moves to London, beginning a nine-year stay in England to be closer to his market.
- The French philosopher Charles Batteux publishes Les beaux-arts réduits à un même principe in Paris, putting forward for the first time the idea of les beaux arts, the fine arts.

== Paintings ==
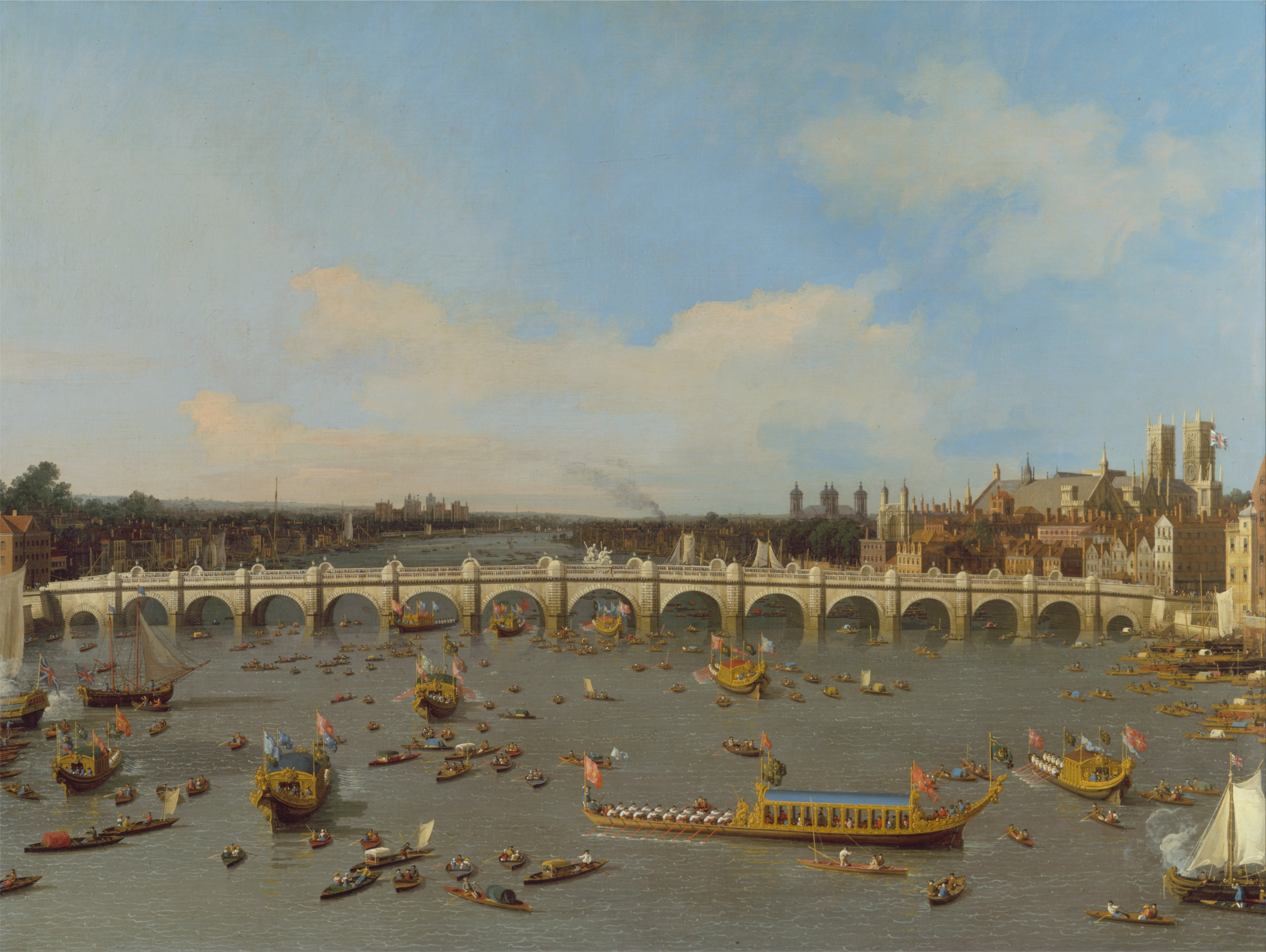
Canaletto's painting of Westminster Bridge

- Canaletto
  - A Most Beautiful View of the City of London Taken Through One of the Centres of the Arches of the New Bridge at Westminster (Alnwick Castle, Northumberland)
  - Westminster Bridge, with the Lord Mayor's Procession on the Thames (c.1746-47; Yale Center for British Art, New Haven, Connecticut)
- Thomas Gainsborough – Conversation in a Park
- Elias Gottlob Haussmann – Johann Sebastian Bach
- Thomas Hudson – Portrait of Theodore Jacobsen
- Joshua Reynolds – Portrait of John Hamilton
- John Smybert – Sir William Pepperrell, Bt
- Giovanni Battista Tiepolo - St. Catherine of Siena

== Births ==
- March 9 – François-Nicolas Delaistre, French sculptor (died 1832)
- March 22 – Gerard van Spaendonck, Dutch painter (died 1822)
- March 30 – Francisco Goya, Aragonese Spanish painter and printmaker (died 1828)
- June 6 – Francesco Saverio Mergalo, Italian portrait painter of the Rococo or late-Baroque period (died 1786)
- October 22 – James Northcote, English painter (died 1831)
- November 11 – Jean Guillaume Moitte, French sculptor (died 1810)
- December 30 – François-André Vincent, French painter (died 1816)
- date unknown
  - Luis Paret y Alcázar, Spanish painter of the late-Baroque or Rococo period (died 1799)
  - Anthonie Andriessen, Dutch landscape painter (died 1813)
  - William Ashford, British painter who worked exclusively in Ireland (died 1824)
  - Domenico Aspari, Italian painter and engraver (died 1831)
  - Etienne Aubry, French painter of primarily portraits and genre subjects (died 1781)
  - Ramón Bayeu, Spanish Neoclassicist painter (died 1793)
  - John Bogle, Scottish miniature painter (died 1803)
  - Joseph Boze, French portrait and miniature painter (died 1826)
  - Teodor Ilić Češljar, one of the best late Baroque and Rococo Serbian painters from the region of Vojvodina (died 1793)
  - Balthasar Anton Dunker, German landscape painter and etcher (died 1807)
  - Mauritius Lowe, British painter and engraver (died 1793)
  - Xi Gang, renowned Chinese calligrapher and painter in Qing Dynasty (died 1803)
  - Philippe-Laurent Roland, French sculptor (died 1816)
  - Michael Angelo Rooker, English oil and watercolour painter, illustrator and engraver (died 1801)
  - Henry Walton, British painter and art dealer (died 1813)

== Deaths ==
- February 22 – Guillaume Coustou the Elder, French sculptor and academician (born 1677)
- March 20 – Nicolas de Largillière, French painter (born 1656)
- March 29 – Matteo Ripa, painter, engraver and missionary (born 1682)
- June 8 – Giacomo Leoni, architect (born 1686)
- July 30 – Francesco Trevisani, Italian painter of frescoes (born 1656)
- December 31 – Antonio Baroni, Italian painter active in Verona (born 1678)
- date unknown
  - Domenico Bocciardo, Italian painter, active in Genoa (born 1680)
  - Jan Baptist Bosschaert, Flemish painter (born 1667)
  - Sebastiano Galeotti, peripatetic Italian painter (born 1656)
  - Francesco Antonio Xaverio Grue, Italian potter and painter (born 1686)
  - Theodor van Pee, Dutch painter (born 1668)
