= Flora Caressed by Zephyr =

Painting by François Gérard

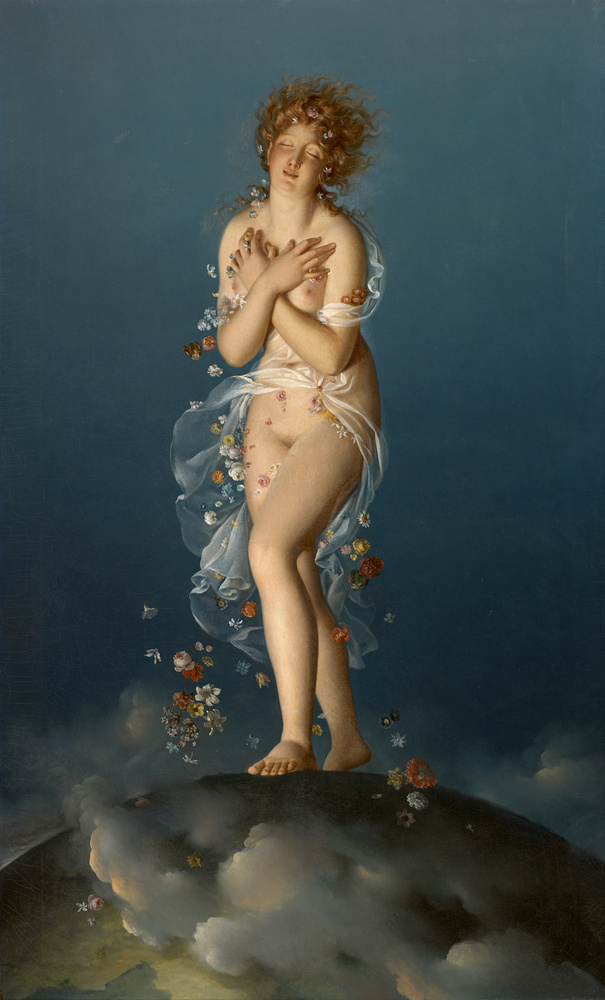
- Artist: François Gérard
- Year: 1802
- Medium: oil on canvas
- Dimensions: 169 cm × 105 cm (67 in × 41 in)
- Location: Museum of Grenoble; Grenoble

Flora Caressed by Zephyr (French: Flore caressée par Zéphyr), also titled Dawn (L'Aurore), is an oil on canvas painting by the French painter François Gérard, from 1802. It depicts the love of Flora (Spring) and Zephyr (the West Wind) from Greco-Roman mythology.

The picture was produced in 1802 as part of a series of works commissioned for the private mansion of Charles Gaudin, the French Minister of Finance. It is now in the Museum of Grenoble.

== Description ==
The picture depicts a young woman as Flora, the ancient Roman goddess of Spring. She is naked and seems to be standing on the terrestrial globe. All around her swirls a light mist, representing Zephyrus, her lover, god of the West Wind. From their caresses a multitude of flowers are created, which rain down over the globe. The young woman crosses her arms on her bosom and keeps her eyes closed. Focused on herself, she seems in ecstasy.

The painting is mythologically inspired. The painter refers to the loves of Chloris (Flora) and Zephyr, recounted by Ovid in the Fasti. The "precisely painted blooms" were informed by Pierre-Joseph Redouté's botanical illustrations.

== Provenance ==
Gérard had his first success with Cupid and Psyche (1798), but only achieved real fame after about 1800, when Napoleon and his circle made him their favourite painter. Flore Caressed by Zephyr (1802) was one of a series of works commissioned for the private mansion of the French Minister of Finance Charles Gaudin, and was probably matched by a representation of Danaë by Girodet, now in the Museum der bildenden Künste in Leipzig.

== See also ==
- Empire style
- Venus Pudica
