= Angélique Mezzara =

French painter

- Born: Marie Angélique Foulon; 1793; Paris, France
- Died: September 13, 1868 (aged 74–75); Paris, France
- Known for: miniaturist, pastellist, painter Painting
- Spouse: Francesco Mezzara

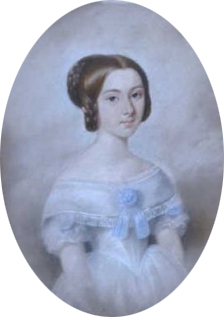
Portrait of melle Mallet by Angélique Mezzara

Angélique Mezzara, born Marie Angélique Foulon, (1793 – September 13, 1868) was a French portrait painter and miniaturist, who frequently worked in pastels. During a time when few women were painters, she exhibited regularly for nearly 30 years at the Paris Salon, the major art event of the time. Two of her sons became sculptors, and a daughter exhibited with her at the Paris exhibition as a painter.

== Family ==
Marie Angélique Foulon was born in 1793 to Nicolas Foulon and Madeleine Marotte du Coudray. Nicolas Foulon was an apostate Benedictine monk, who at one point drew up a French breviary to replace the Roman Catholic one. He left and was expelled from the Jansenist monastery of Blancs-Manteaux in Paris at the time of the French Revolution. His revolutionary political involvement reportedly included being bailiff at the Council of 500, and serving in the Tribunat and Senate. Madeleine Marotte du Coudray had been raised in a severe Jansenist family. Because of opposition from her family, the couple lived together for several years and had at least one child before formally declaring their union in a civil ceremony on January 11, 1793, as a mariage provisoire. Marie Angélique was the second of their four children. Her older sister, also named Marie, was born September 24, 1791, and is noted in the marriage declaration.

== Marriage and career ==
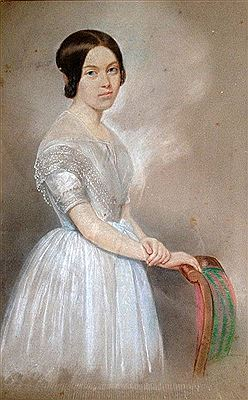
Jeune Fille by Angélique Mezzara

By 1813, Marie Angélique Foulon, "an artiste peintre" was married to Thomas François Gaspard Mezzara, also known as Francis or Francesco Mezzara (1774–February 3, 1845). The couple lived in Paris at 16 Rue d'Enfer as of 1813, and at 89 Rue de Charonne as of 1818. Although identified at the time of his marriage as a "peintre d'histoire", his works were rejected when he submitted them to the Paris Salon in 1842 and 1844. A self-portrait was the only painting by Francesco Mezzara known to exist as of 2014. There are suggestions that his main source of income was as a dealer in art and antiquities.

The couple traveled briefly in the United States in 1817 and again in 1819. Their first son, Joseph-Ernest-Amédée Mezzara (March 2, 1820 – 1901) was born in New York. Their second son, Pierre-Alexandre-Louis Mezzara (December 9, 1825 – January 30, 1883) was born in Évreux, France. A daughter, Marie-Adèle Angiola Mezzara (August 1, 1828-) was born in Paris. It is possible that another daughter, Clémentine, may have been born in the United States.

Contemporary sources suggest that the marriage was not happy: Pierre-Jean de Béranger wrote to David d'Angers that Madame Mezzara supported her "nombreuse famille" through her work as a painter, referring to "L'histoire des malheurs de la mere" (the story of the misfortunes of the mother). Certainly, Madame Mezzara worked steadily as an artist after her children were born, and after her husband died in 1845. As early as 1825, in Évreux, she was painting portraits. The Database of Salon Artists (1827–1850) indicates that she submitted work to the Paris Salon as early as the Salon of 1827, though she was not accepted in that year. In 1833, she submitted 5 works, of which 4 were accepted. From then on, most of her submissions were accepted. These included both drawings and pastels. A list of her works in the Dictionnaire général des artistes de l'école française indicates that she exhibited at the Paris Salon almost every year from 1833 to 1852. This was a substantial achievement, given the restrictions facing women artists of the time.

By 1834, the Salon records her as living at 75 Rue du Faubourg-Saint-Martin. She was mentioned with other artists, including the women "de Mmes de Varennes, Clotilde Gérard, Fanny Allaux, Laure de Léoménil et Angélique Mezzara" in Annuaire historique universel, pour 1839. In La phalange: revue de la science sociale, she and other women portrait painters at the Salon of 1845 were mentioned: "mesdames Armide Lepeut, Sophie Rude; Nina Bianchi, Elisa Blondel, Élisa Bernard, Angélique Mezzara". The women's works were also commended as being more expressive than those exhibited by the men.

One of Angélique Mezzara's portraits was shown in the ninth annual exhibition of the Artists' Fund Society of Philadelphia in 1844. She is identified as living in Philadelphia at that time, but nothing is known about how long she may have stayed in the United States.

It is possible that she translated a novel, La Rêve de la Vie, from English to French, for publication in 1858.

== Children ==
Both of her sons became artists. Joseph Mezzara was both a sculptor and a painter, portraying prominent contemporary figures. Although his earliest submissions to the Paris Salon were refused, a number of his marble portrait busts were accepted by the Paris Salon between 1852 and 1875. Joseph Mezzara married Mathilde Leenhoff in 1856. Mathilde was a sister of Suzanne Leenhoff, who had a complicated relationship with Édouard Manet. Joseph's sons Francois Mezzara and Charles Mezzara, and Charles' wife Florence Koechlin, are also listed as painters and students of Joseph Mezzara in Dictionnaire général des artistes.

Pierre (or Pietro) Mezzara also became a sculptor, but moved to the United States, possibly because of the California Gold Rush. He lived in San Francisco, and was known for his work as a cameo cutter. He created the first memorial statue of Abraham Lincoln. It was dedicated (in plaster) in San Francisco in 1866, and destroyed (in bronze) by the San Francisco earthquake of 1906. Pietro Mezzara was involved with the California Art Union and the San Francisco Art Association, and helped found the San Francisco School of Design.

Clémentine Mezzara, who exhibited watercolors at the Salon of 1847 and 1848, may have been a daughter of Angélique. Salon records for 1847 list both Angélique Mezzara and Clémentine Mezzara as living at 11 Quai Napoléon.

== Death ==
Between 1849 and 1852, Angélique moved to 101 Rue Blanche, the address at which she died on September 13, 1868. Her death was recorded as follows: "Acte de décès: Marie Angélique FOULON, artiste peintre, âgée de soixante-quinze ans, née à Paris, décédée ce matin, à quatre heures trois quarts en son domicile, Rue Blanche, n°. 101, veuve de François Gaspard MEZZARA." The death was reported by "M. Joseph Ernest Mezzara, sculpteur, âgé de quarante-huit ans, dem[euran]t à Paris, Rue d'Alambert [d'Alembert], n°. 16, fils de la défunte."

== Known works ==
The Dictionnaire général des artistes lists the following works shown at the Salon by Mme Angélique Mezzara:

- S. 1833. Portrait de M. Manuel, d'apres M. Brolling;
  - Portrait de Mme. C. G., d'apres M. Hersent;
  - Portraits, dessins au pastel meme numero.
- S. 1834. Portraits, dessines meme numero.
- S. 1836. Portraits au pastel, meme numero.
- S. 1837. Portrait d'hommes, pastel.
  - Portrait de femme;
  - Portraits de MMlles M., pastels.
- S. 1838. Portrait de Mme N., pastel.
  - Portrait de M. E. V., pastel.
- S. 1839. Portrait de Mlle P. G., pastel.
- S. 1840. Portrait de Mme de T., pastel.
- S. 1841. Etude au pastel.
- S. 1843. Portrait de Mlle M. R., pastel.
- S. 1845. Portrait de Mme M. R., pastel.
  - Portrait de Mlle A. R., pastel.
- S. 1847. Portrait de Mme la comtesse de Salvandy, pastel.
- S. 1849. Portrait de Mlle C. M., pastel.
- S. 1852. Portrait de M. A. V., pastel.
  - Portrait de Mme E. V., pastel.
