= Artists in Isabey's Studio =

1798 painting by Louis-Léopold Boilly

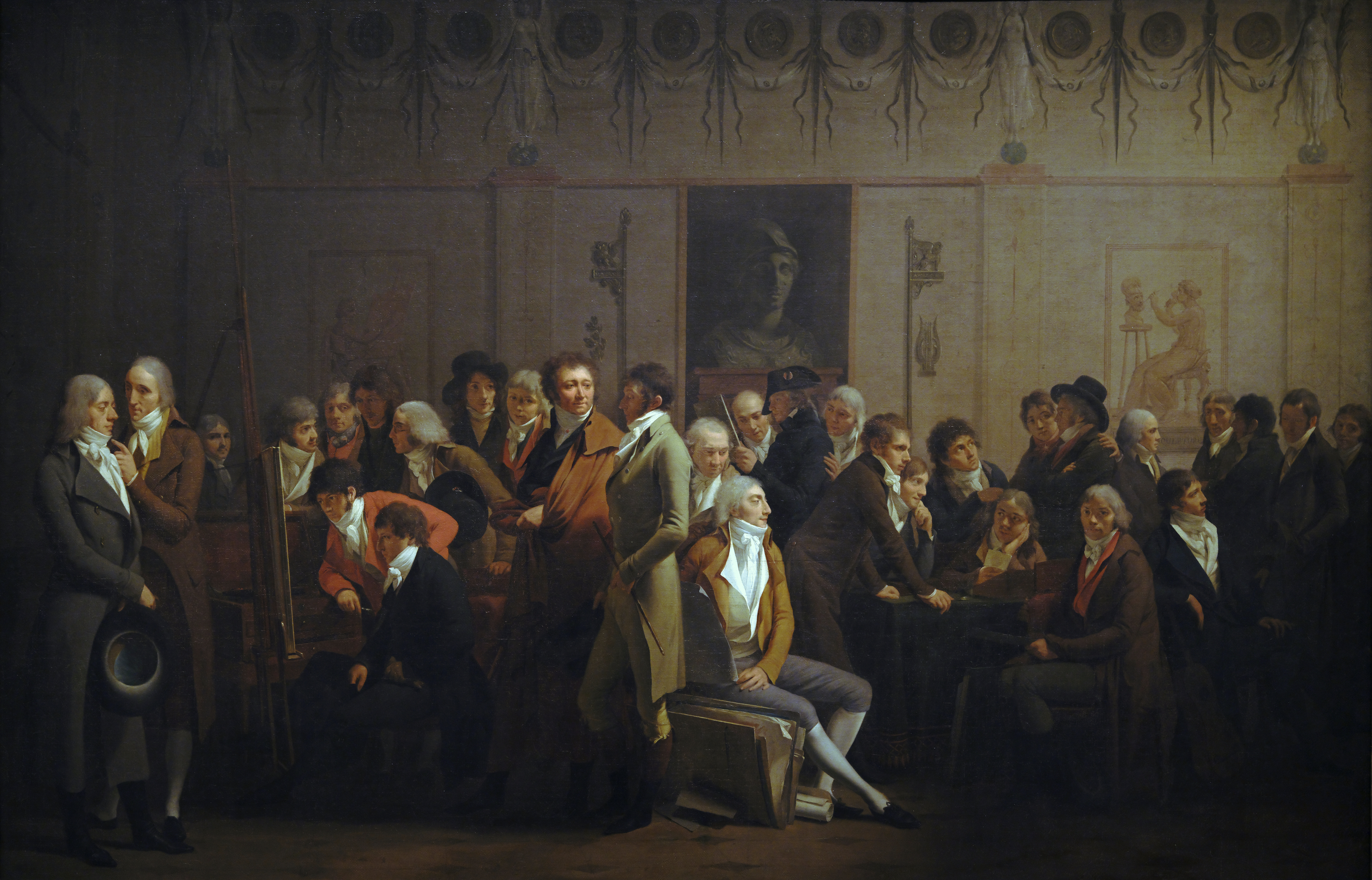
- Artist: Louis-Léopold Boilly
- Year: 1798
- Medium: Oil on canvas
- Dimensions: 71.5 cm × 111 cm (28.1 in × 44 in)
- Location: Louvre, Paris

Artists in Isabey's Studio (French: Réunion d'artistes dans l'atelier d'Isabey) is a painting of 1798 by the French artist Louis-Léopold Boilly, showing many artists who were influential under the French Directory. It was displayed with 529 other works at the Paris Salon of 1798, which was mainly noted for Gérard's Cupid and Psyche. It is now in the Louvre, whose collections it entered in 1911.

From left to right it shows the composer Étienne Nicolas Méhul, the art critic Hoffman, an unknown man, the sculptor Charles-Louis Corbet, the painters Michel Martin Drolling, Jean-Louis Demarne, Jean-Baptiste Isabey (leaning towards the easel), François Gérard (seated before the easel), Nicolas-Antoine Taunay, Swebach-Desfontaines, the miniature painter Charles Bourgeois, the painter Guillon Lethière, Carle Vernet, the engraver Jean Duplessis-Bertaux, the architects Pierre-François-Léonard Fontaine and Charles Percier, the actor Baptiste aîné of the Comédie-Française (seated by a folio of drawings), the painter and architect Jean-Thomas Thibault, the painters Jan-Frans van Dael and Pierre-Joseph Redouté, the actor François-Joseph Talma, the painters Charles Meynier, Louis-Léopold Boilly himself, the actor Chénard du Théâtre-Italien, the painters Xavier Bidault, Girodet-Trioson (seated and looking at the viewer), the sculptor Denis Chaudet, the engraver Maurice Blot, the sculptor François-Frédéric Lemot, the painter Gioacchino Serangeli and an unknown man.

== Bibliography ==
- Alsdorf, Bridget. Fellow Men: Fantin-Latour and the Problem of the Group in Nineteenth-Century French Painting. Princeton University Press, 2022.
- Eitner, Lorenz. French Paintings of the Nineteenth Century: Before impressionism. National Gallery of Art, 2000.
- Whitlum-Cooper, Francesca. Boilly: Scenes of Parisian Life. National Gallery Company, 2019.
