= Portrait of John Hamilton =

Painting by Joshua Reynolds

- Artist: Joshua Reynolds
- Year: 1746
- Type: Oil on canvas, portrait painting
- Dimensions: 130 cm × 100.2 cm (51 in × 39.4 in)
- Location: Abercorn Estate

Portrait of John Hamilton is a 1746 portrait painting by the British artist Joshua Reynolds. It depicts the Royal Navy officer John Hamilton. Hamilton is shown at full-length in the busby and flamboyant uniform of a hussar. On the right of the painting is a dismasted ship in a stormy sea, likely making reference to the HMS Princess Louisa which was shipwreck in 1736 while escorting George II on his return from Hanover. Hamilton had been particularly noted for his bravery in the aftermath of the wreck. His career was cut short when was drowned at Portsmouth Harbour in 1755. Reynolds painted him at Plymouth.

Reynolds was in his twenties at the time and at the beginning a successful career. He would later go on to become President of the Royal Academy. His biographer Edmond Malone suggested that this painting was the first that brought him to public attention. The picture is today in the collection of Abercorn Estate. In 1876 a mezzotint based on the painting was produced by the engraver Richard Josey.

== Bibliography ==
- McIntyre, Ian. Joshua Reynolds: The Life and Times of the First President of the Royal Academy. Allen Lane, 2003.
- Postle, Edward (ed.) Joshua Reynolds: The Creation of Celebrity. Harry N. Abrams, 2005.
- Bolton, Andrew. Wild: Fashion Untamed. Metropolitan Museum of Art, 2004.
