= Portrait of Sir Francis Burdett (Lawrence) =

1793 painting by Thomas Lawrence

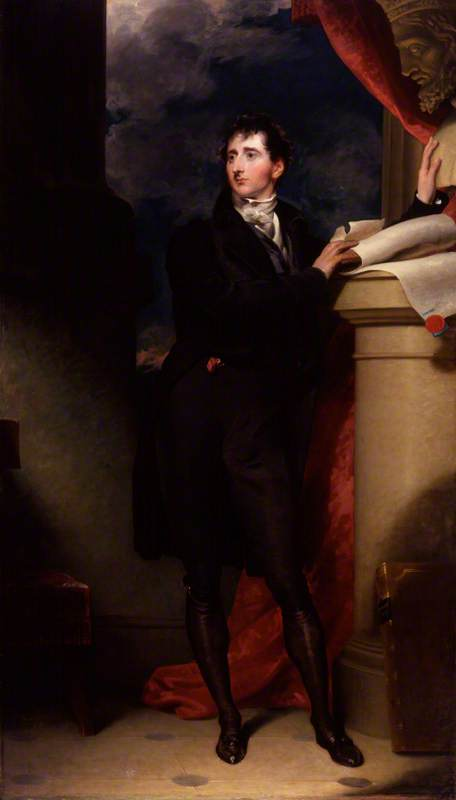
- Artist: Thomas Lawrence
- Year: 1793
- Type: Oil on canvas, portrait painting
- Dimensions: 250.2 cm × 143.5 cm (98.5 in × 56.5 in)
- Location: National Portrait Gallery; London

Portrait of Sir Francis Burdett is a 1793 portrait painting by the British artist Thomas Lawrence. It depicts the radical English politician Sir Francis Burdett. A baronet's son, Burdett was a long-standing Member of Parliament. His 1810 imprisonment led to the Burdett Riots in London. He is shown at full-length leaning on a column. The sculpture of an ancient English king and the copy of the Doomsday Book at his feet appeared to celebrate his championing traditional British rights.

This work was commissioned by the banker Thomas Coutts when his daughter Sophia married Burdett in August 1793 along with a companion piece featuring the new Lady Burdett. As was common with Lawrence, they remained in his studio for many years unfinished. At Lawrence's death in 1830, the paintings were claimed by Harriet Mellon, the widow of Coutts. They were likely finished by Richard Evans, Lawrence's long-standing assistant. The work was subsequently exhibited at the British Institution in Pall Mall in 1853.The painting of Burdett www acquired by the National Portrait Gallery in 1952.

Burdett was painted twice towards the end of his career, in 1838 and 1843, by Lawrence's friend and successor as President of the Royal Academy Martin Archer Shee.

== See also ==
- Portrait of Sir Francis Burdett, an 1843 painting by Martin Archer Shee

== Bibliography ==
- Elliott, Kamilla. Portraiture and British Gothic Fiction: The Rise of Picture Identification, 1764–1835. JHU Press, 2012.
- Levey, Michael. Sir Thomas Lawrence. Yale University Press, 2005.
