= The Prince of Wales's Phaeton =

Painting by George Stubbs

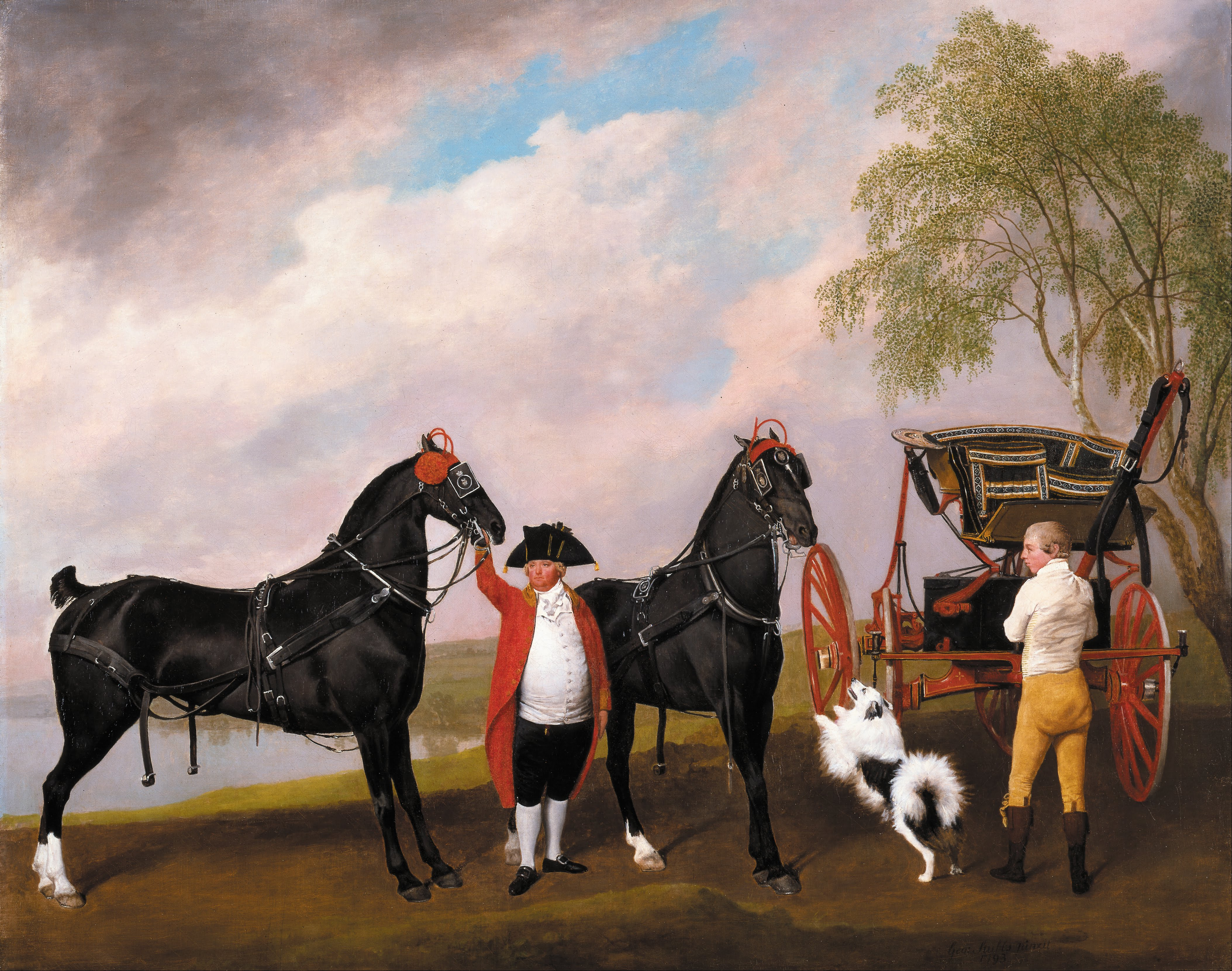
- Artist: George Stubbs
- Year: 1793
- Type: Oil on panel, animal painting
- Dimensions: 102 cm × 128.1 cm (40 in × 50.4 in)
- Location: Royal Collection

The Prince of Wales's Phaeton is an oil painting on panel by the British artist George Stubbs, from 1793. It is held at the Royal Collection.

It depicts a phaeton, a fashionable racing carriage belonging to the Prince of Wales and also features the prince's coachman Samuel Thomas, in livery, with two horses. Also included is the prince's spitz dog Fino.

It was part of a series of paintings commissioned by the Prince, the future George IV, from Stubbs. It hung at Carlton House in London and later at Royal Lodge at Windsor. It remains in the Royal Collection.

== Bibliography ==
- Blake, Robin. George Stubbs And The Wide Creation:Animals, People and Places in the Life of George Stubbs 1724-1806. Random House, 2016.
- Gaunt, William. The Great Century of British Painting: Hogarth to Turner. Phaidon, 1978.
- Egerton, Judy. George Stubbs, Painter. Yale University Press, 2007.
