= The Storming of the Bastille (Thévenin) =

Painting by Charles Thévenin

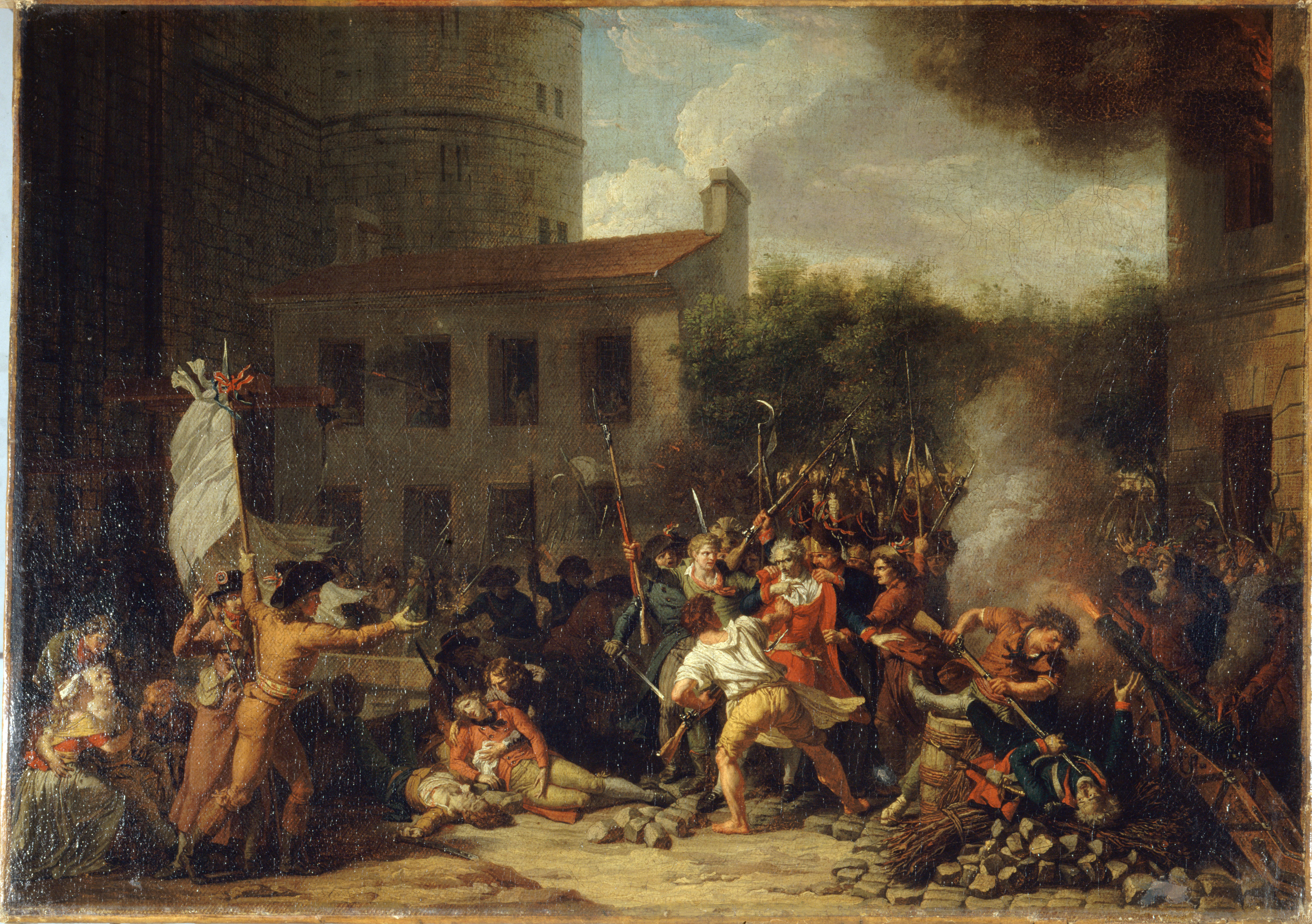
- Artist: Charles Thévenin
- Year: 1793
- Type: Oil on canvas, history painting
- Dimensions: 41 cm × 58.5 cm (16 in × 23.0 in)
- Location: Musée Carnavalet, Paris

The Storming of the Bastille (French: Prise de la Bastille, le 14 juillet 1789 ) is a 1793 history painting by the French artist Charles Thévenin. It depicts the Storming of the Bastille on 14 July 1789 at the beginning of the French Revolution. Located in Paris the Bastille had served as a notorious prison during the Ancien Regime, and it's storming by insurgents became an iconic symbol of the new era. Thévenin began working on a Etching not long after the incident, which became the basis for his later painting. Thévenin was a noted pupil of François-André Vincent, one of the leading artists of the era along with Jacques-Louis David.

The painting was displayed at the Salon of 1793 and again for the Salon of 1795 held at the Louvre in Paris. Today it forms part of the collection of the city's Musée Carnavalet, having been acquired in 1886. Thévenin also produced an etching based on the painting.

== Bibliography ==
- Mansfield, Elizabeth C. The Perfect Foil: François-André Vincent and the Revolution in French Painting. University of Minnesota Press, 2011.
- Roberts, David. Jacques-Louis David and Jean-Louis Prieur, Revolutionary Artists: The Public, the Populace, and Images of the French Revolution. State University of New York Press, 2000.
