= Database of Salon Artists =

The Database of Salon Artists is a resource listing every submission to the Paris Salon between 1827 and 1850, using information derived from the original Salon registers now held in the Archives des Musées Nationaux, part of the Service des Bibliothèques, des Archives et de la Documentation Générale des Musées de France. Launched in March 2014, it lists over 80,000 entries of all types (painting, sculpture, engraving, lithography, etc.) while recording the exhibition record of every artist submitting work to the Salon. It also includes biographical information for the majority of these artists, such as birthplace, birthdate and artistic education.

The Database was developed as part of the AHRC-funded research project 'Painting for the Salon? The French State, Artists and Academy, 1830-1852' at the University of Exeter. The Database is also accessible via the website of the Archives des Musées Nationaux (AMN), based in the Louvre Palace.
