= Portrait of George, Prince of Wales =

Painting by William Beechey

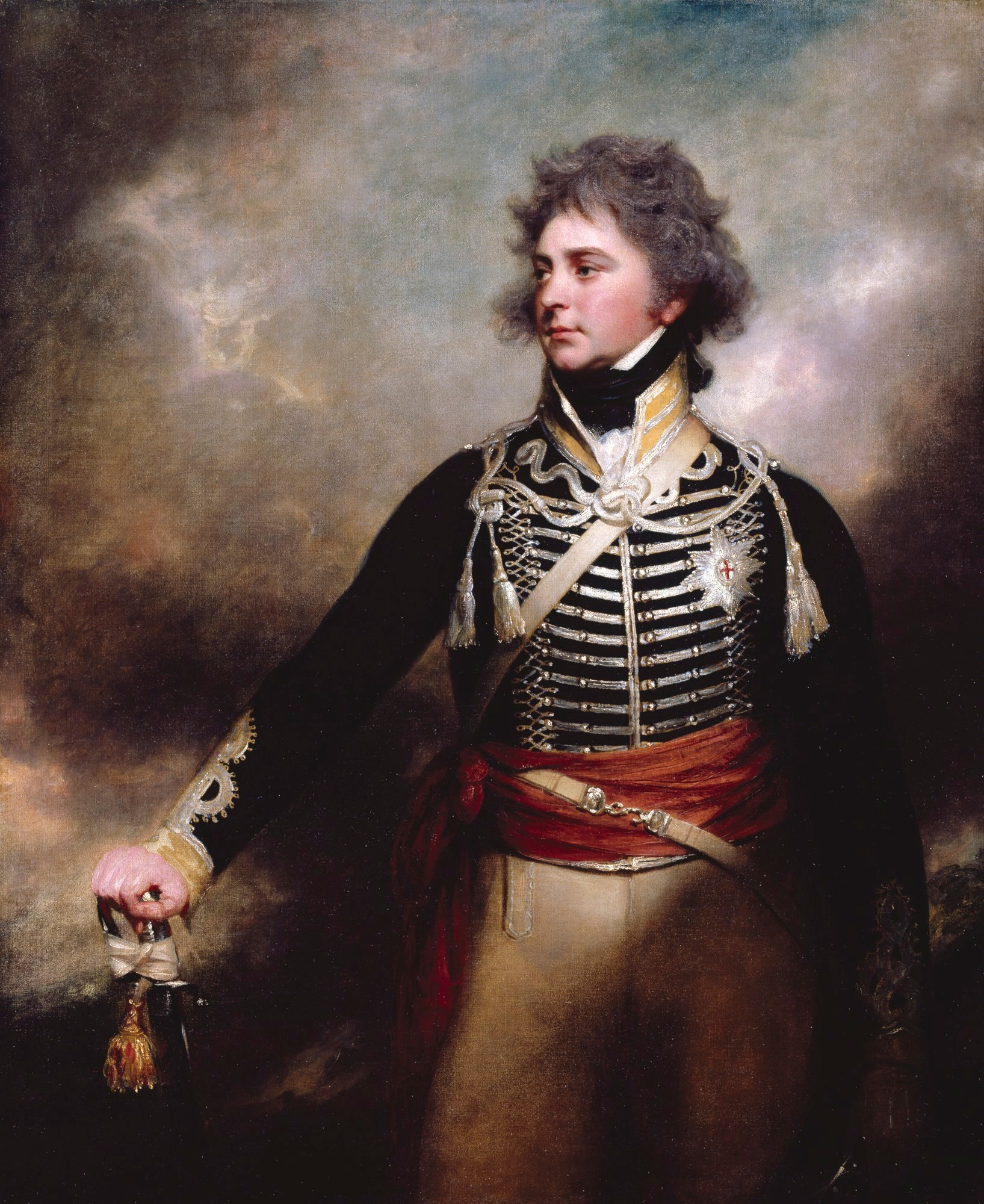
- Artist: William Beechey
- Year: 1798
- Type: Oil on canvas, portrait
- Dimensions: 141.4 cm × 117.6 cm (55.7 in × 46.3 in)
- Location: Royal Academy, London

Portrait of George, Prince of Wales is a 1798 portrait painting by the English artist William Beechey. It depicts the future George IV, then Prince of Wales. George, heir to his father George III, is shown in the uniform of the Tenth Light Dragoons. The style imitates those of Rembrandt from the seventeenth century.

It was painted by Beechey as his "diploma piece" after his election to the Royal Academy. The original remains in the collection of the Royal Academy. Beechey also painted a copy in 1803 at Prince George's command, to present to his younger brother Edward, Duke of Kent. This is now in the Royal Collection.

Beechey was a prominent portrait artist of the Regency era, picking up a number of royal commissions. In 1830 he stood for election as the president of the Royal Academy but finished second to Martin Archer Shee.

== Bibliography ==
- Robinson, Leonard. William Etty: The Life and Art. McFarland, 2007.
- Roberts, William. Sir William Beechey, R.A.. Duckworth and Company, 1907.
