= Thomas Foster (painter) =

Irish portrait painter

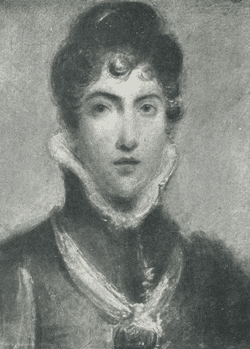
- Born: 1796-1798; Dublin, Ireland
- Died: 1826 (aged 27–28); Piccadilly, London
- Occupation: Painter

Thomas Foster (1798 – 1826) was an Irish portrait painter.

== Life ==
Thomas Foster was born in Dublin between 1796 and 1798. He enrolled in the Dublin Society School in 1811.

Foster died by suicide in March 1826 aged 29. He shot himself in a hotel in Piccadilly, London. In a letter he stated his friends had abandoned him and that he had grown tired of life. It is unclear if he was troubled by the large commission he received from John Wilson Croker or by an unrequited love for a young woman who was the subject of one of his portraits.

== Career ==
He was awarded a premium for 2 portraits and a subject picture in 1815 which were exhibited with Hibernian Society of Artists, and a painting titled The Adoration of the Shepherds exhibited on Hawkins Street. In 1816 he exhibited Hercules throwing Lychas into the Sea, and in 1817 two works, Portrait and Christ taken down from the Cross. Foster moved to London in 1818 at age 21 and entered the schools of the Royal Academy. He visited the studio of the sculptor Joseph Nollekens regularly, modelling from antique heads. He became friends with Croker, and painted portraits of a number of Croker's relatives. He was also an acquaintance of Sir Thomas Lawrence, and he copied Lawrence's portraits for Croker.

He exhibited with the Royal Academy from 1819 to 1825. In 1822 he exhibited Mazeppa. He also exhibited with the British Institution between 1819 and 1826. He was among the first associates of the Royal Hibernian Academy (RHA), but died before the first exhibition. Foster was considered well-connected and was popular in society, but fellow painter James Northcote believed this hindered him in becoming a great artist as he spent too much time socialising. Foster was a model for one of the murderers in Northcote's Burial of the Princes in the Tower. Foster had been commissioned to paint the scene of Louis XVIII receiving the Order of the Garter at Carlton House, for which he produced a number of studies.

At the time of his death he left an unfinished portrait of John Banim on his easel. Four of his paintings were shown posthumously at the first exhibition of the RHA.

== Selected works ==
- The Cup found in Benjamin's Sack (1818)
- Mercury sealing up the Eyes of Argus (1819)
- Portrait of Thomas Elrington, Provost of Trinity College (1820)
- Sir Henry Bishop (1821)
- Colonel Phillips (1821)
- Miss Tree (1823)
