= Henry Bryan Ziegler =

British artist

Henry Bryan Ziegler (1798–1874) was a British artist, known as a landscape and portrait painter.

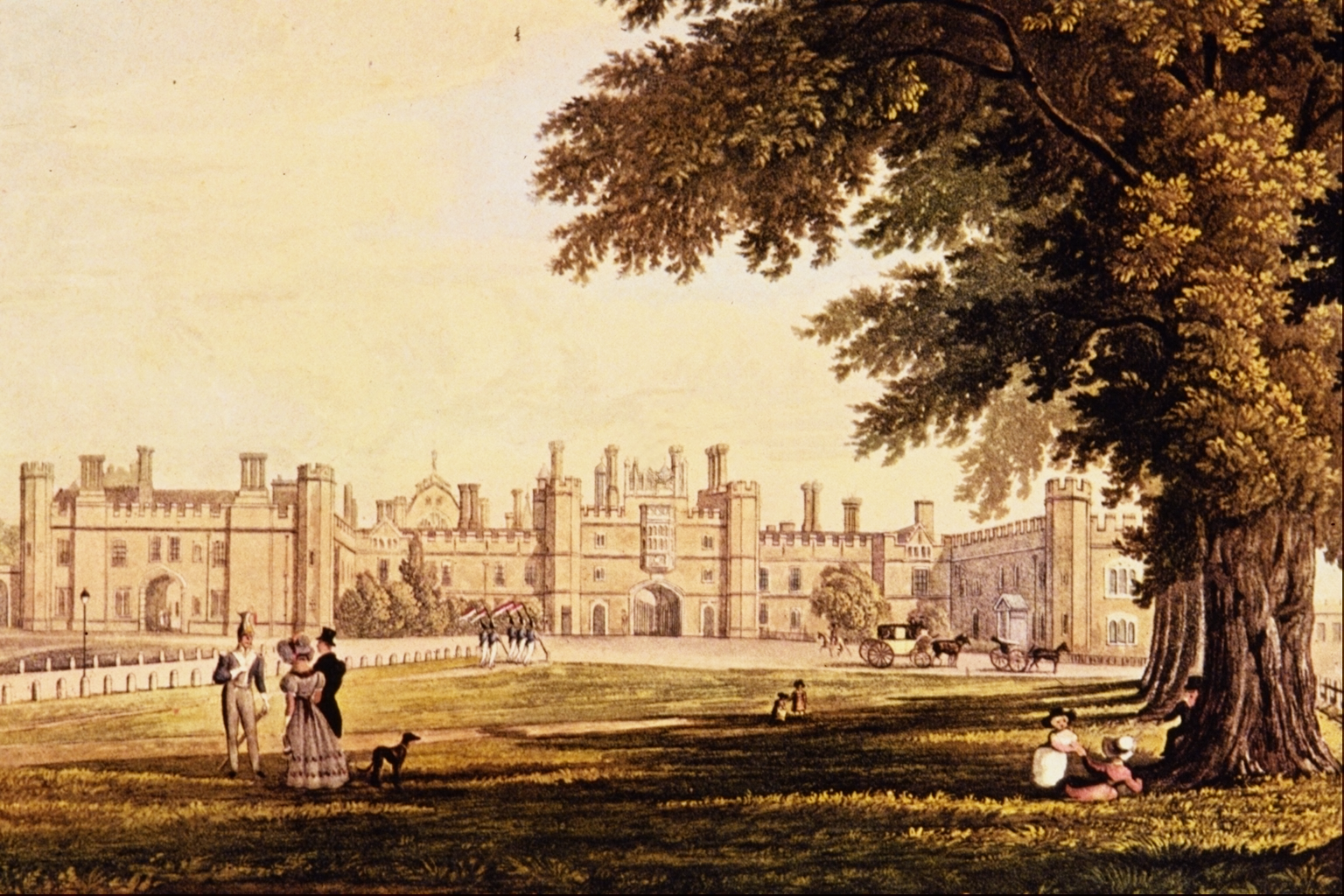
Hampton Court Palace by Henry Bryan Ziegler

Ziegler studied under John Varley and at the Royal Academy schools. He made a reputation as drawing master to members of the royal family. In later life he mainly painted watercolour portraits. A series of lithographs after Ziegler by Louis Haghe of the lodges of Windsor Great Park was published in 1839, early in the reign of Queen Victoria.
