= Conversation in a Park =

Painting by Thomas Gainsborough

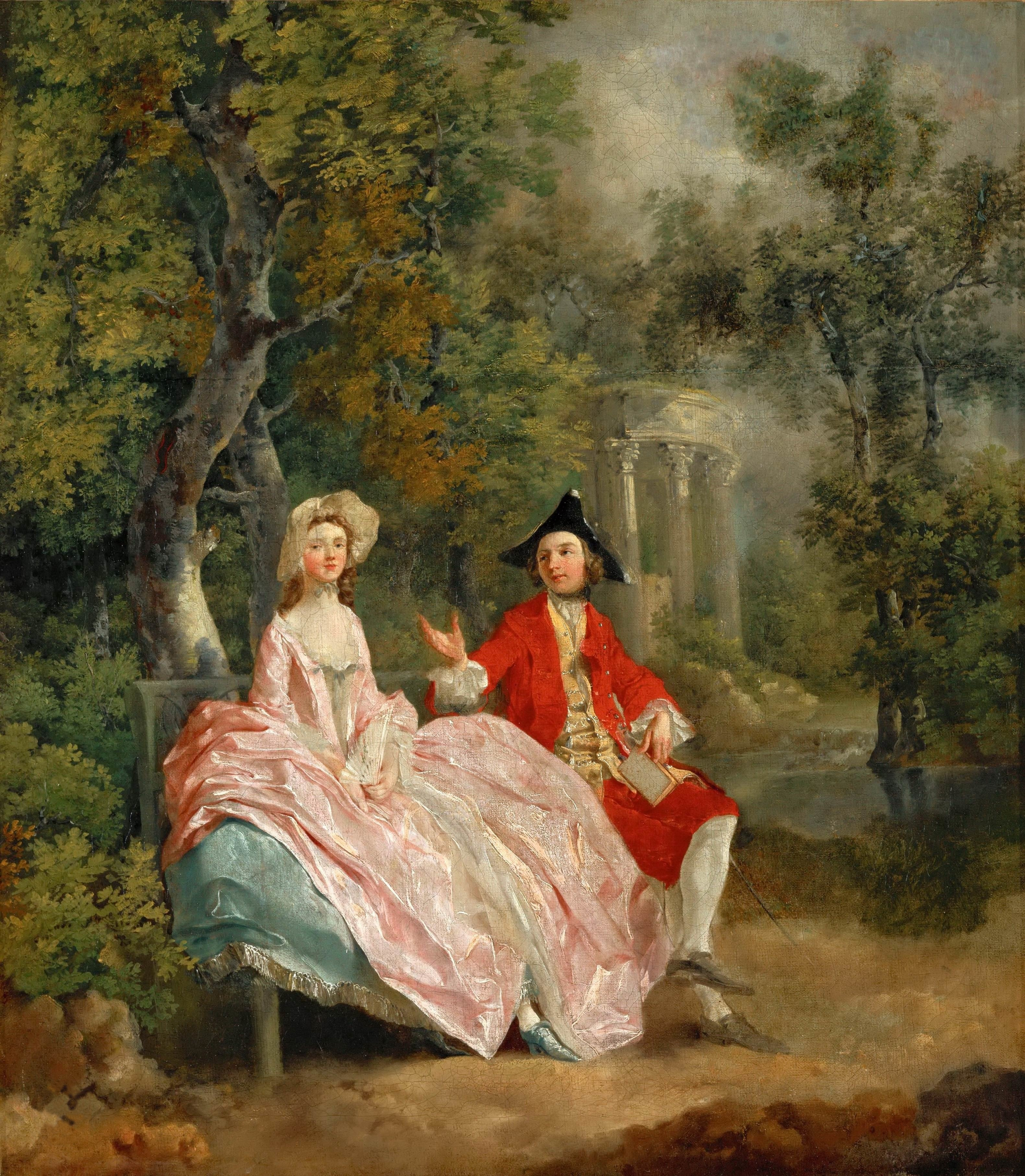
- Artist: Thomas Gainsborough
- Year: 1746
- Type: Oil on canvas, conversation piece
- Dimensions: 73 cm × 68 cm (29 in × 27 in)
- Location: Louvre; Paris

Conversation in a Park (French: Conversation dans un parc) is an oil painting by the British artist Thomas Gainsborough, from 1746. A conversation piece, it depicts a couple sitting on a bench in the gardens of a country estate. It is believed to feature a self-portrait of the painter and his wife Margaret, who he married that year.

It may have been loosely inspired by Gainsborough's courtship in Vauxhall Gardens. It certainly represents an idealised view, and represents the sort of society that Gainsborough hopes to paint in his portraits and aspired to join himself. The painting has been in the collection of the Louvre, in Paris, since 1952.

== Bibliography ==
- Belsey, Hugh. Thomas Gainsborough: A Country Life. Prestel, 2002.
- Hamilton, James. Gainsborough: A Portrait. Hachette UK, 2017.
- Postle, Martin. Thomas Gainsborough. Tate, 2002.
