= General Augereau at the Bridge of Arcole =

Painting by Charles Thévenin

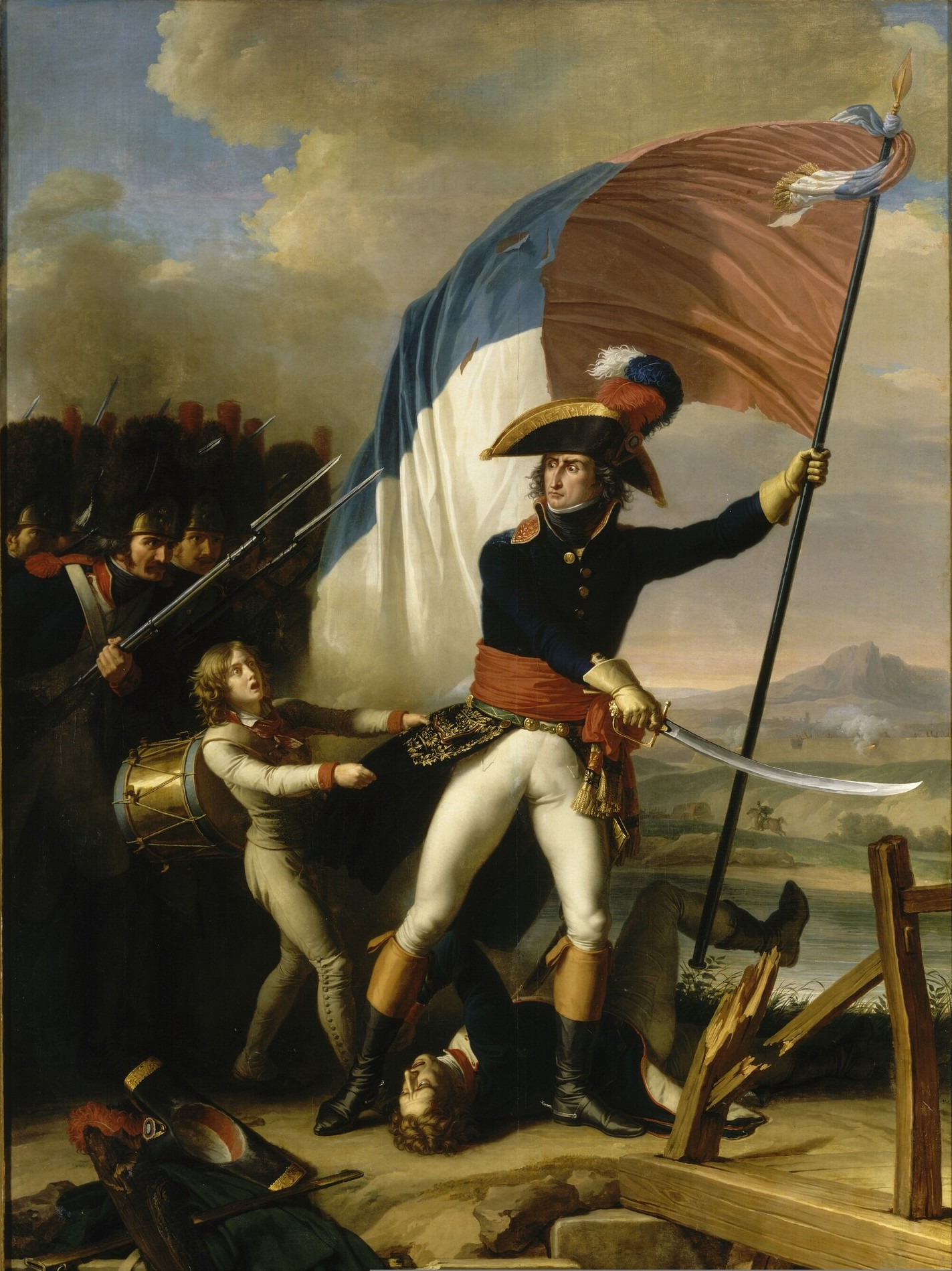
- Artist: Charles Thévenin
- Year: 1798
- Type: Oil on canvas, history painting
- Dimensions: 362 cm × 268 cm (143 in × 106 in)
- Location: Palace of Versailles; Versailles

General Augereau at the Bridge of Arcole (French: Augereau au pont d'Arcole) is a 1798 history painting by the French artist Charles Thévenin. It portrays the Battle of Arcole fought on 15 November 1796 during the Italian campaign of the French Revolutionary Wars. During heavy fighting, French troops were able to force a crossing of the bridge defended by the Austrians. Both Charles-Pierre Augereau and Napoleon Bonaparte distinguished themselves in the battle and the two generals were officially accorded equal credit for the victory. Bonaparte, the future Emperor of France, was portrayed as a dashing hero in Antoine-Jean Gros's Bonaparte at the Bridge of Arcole.

Augereau's own supporters countered by commissioning this heroic depiction of the general. Thévenin was a noted neoclassical artist and former pupil of François-André Vincent. The picture was displayed at the Salon of 1798 held at the Louvre in Paris. It was later transferred to the collection of the Museum of French History at the Palace of Versailles. A print based on the painting was produced by the engraver Louis Charles Ruotte.

== Bibliography ==
- Grigsby, Darcy Grimaldo. Extremities: Painting Empire in Post-revolutionary France. Yale University Press, 2002.
- Hornstein, Katie. Picturing War in France, 1792–1856. Yale University Press, 2018.
