= Mikhail Shibanov =

Russian painter

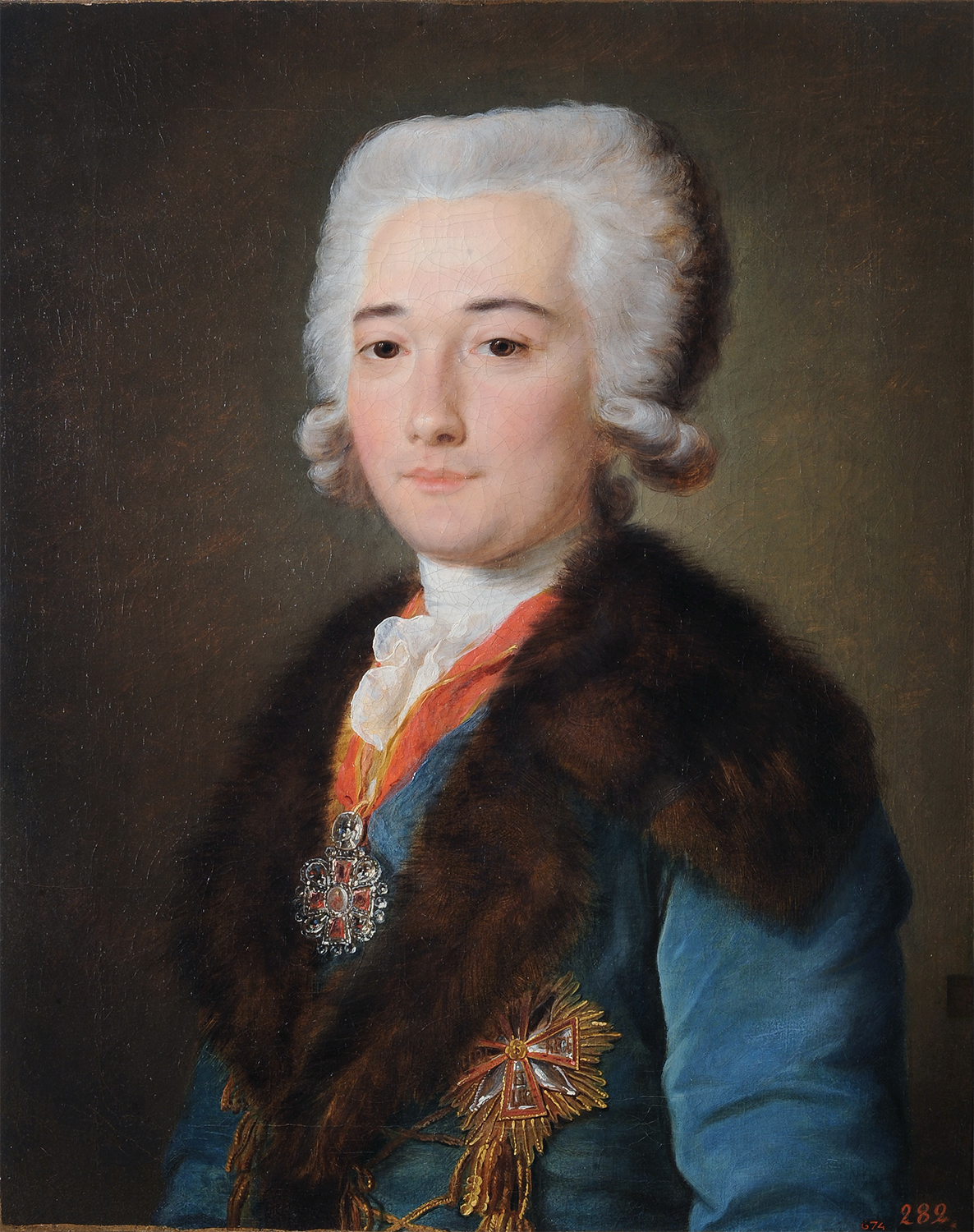
Portrait of Alexander Dmitriev-Mamonov, before 1786-1788

Mikhail Shibanov (Russian: Михаил Шибанов) was a Russian painter active during the 1780s; a portrait of Count Alexander Dmitriev-Mamonov of which he is known to be the author dates to about this time. Shibanov was a serf of Prince Grigory Potemkin; his date of birth is unknown. Two of his genre scenes are held at the Tretyakov Gallery in Moscow; the above-mentioned portrait is in the Russian Museum now.

Shibanov died sometime after 1798.
