= Philippe-Laurent Roland =

French sculptor

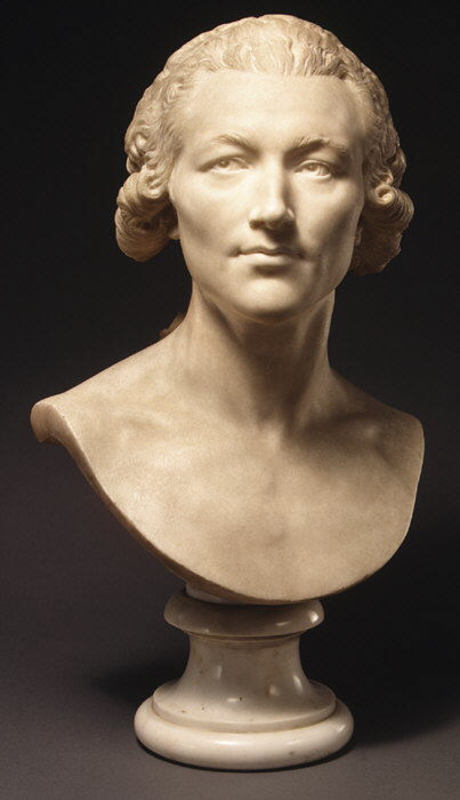
- Born: 13 August 1746
- Died: 11 July 1816 (aged 69)
- Resting place: Père Lachaise Cemetery
- Occupation: Sculptor
- Awards: Chevalier of the Legion of Honour (1806–)

Philippe-Laurent Roland (13 August 1746 – 11 July 1816) was a French sculptor. A native of Pont-à-Marcq, Nord, he died in Paris. His art is neoclassical in style; he worked a great deal in stone and in terra cotta. Some of his reliefs may be seen on the facade of the Louvre.

== Biography ==
The son of a tailor and innkeeper, Philippe-Laurent Roland began his training at the drawing school in Lille, in his native region. He had a younger brother, the painter Jacques-François-Joseph Roland (1757-1804).

In 1764, he left for Paris and joined the studio of Augustin Pajou with whom he maintained a collaboration of nearly forty years. He then collaborated with him on the decoration of the Palace of Versailles and the Palais-Royal.

== Works ==
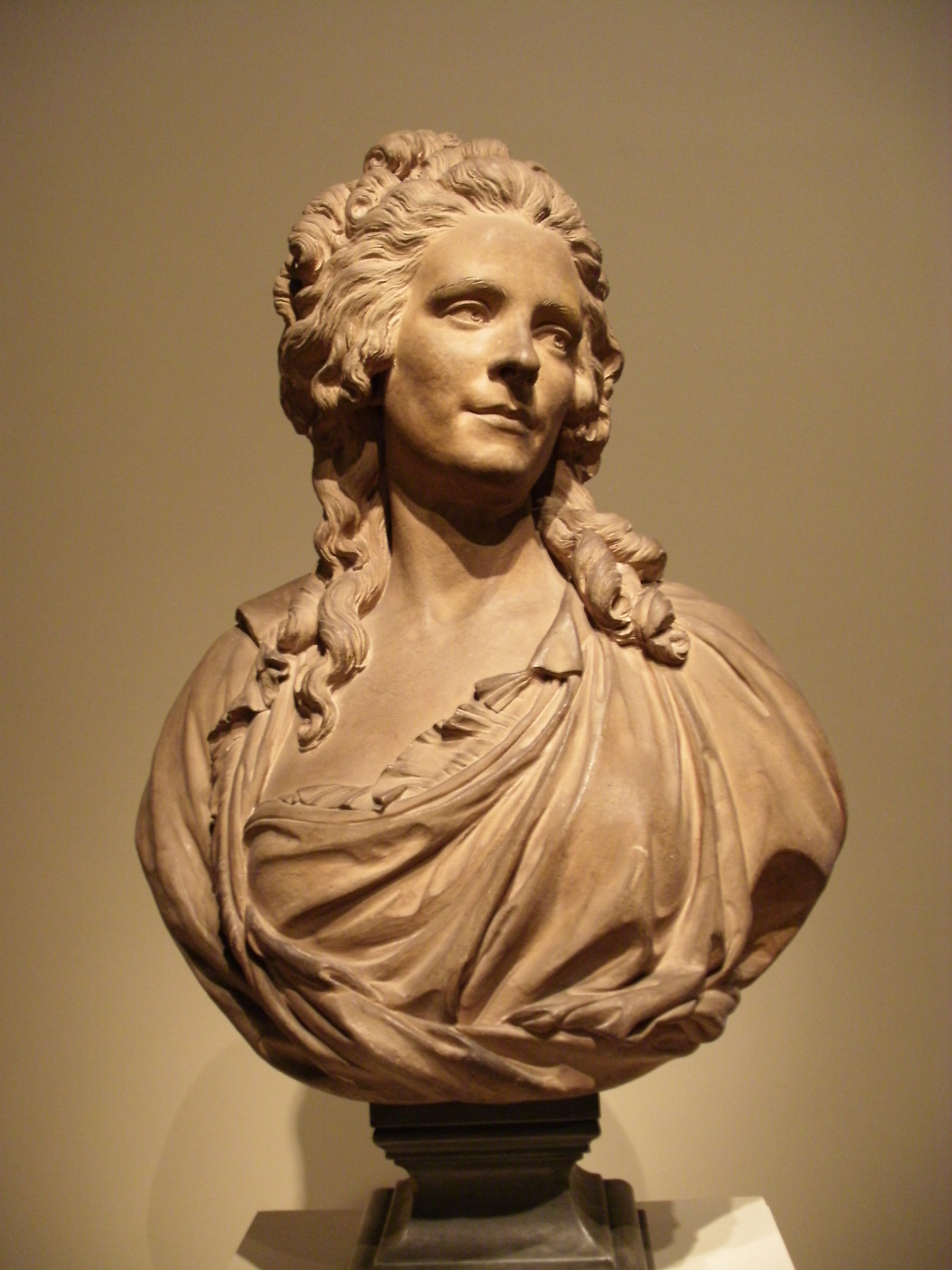
Thérèse-Françoise Potain Roland, Wife of the Sculptor, terra cotta, in the National Gallery of Art
