= Francesco Saverio Mergalo =

Italian painter

Francesco Saverio Mergalo (6 June 1746 – 12 April 1786) was an Italian painter of the Rococo or late-Baroque period, active near his natal city of Monteleone di Calabria. He was best known for his portraits.

He is described as being born poor and dying poor. He painted the ceiling of a church in Jonadi in Calabria.
