= Mauritius Lowe =

British engraver and painter (1746–1793)

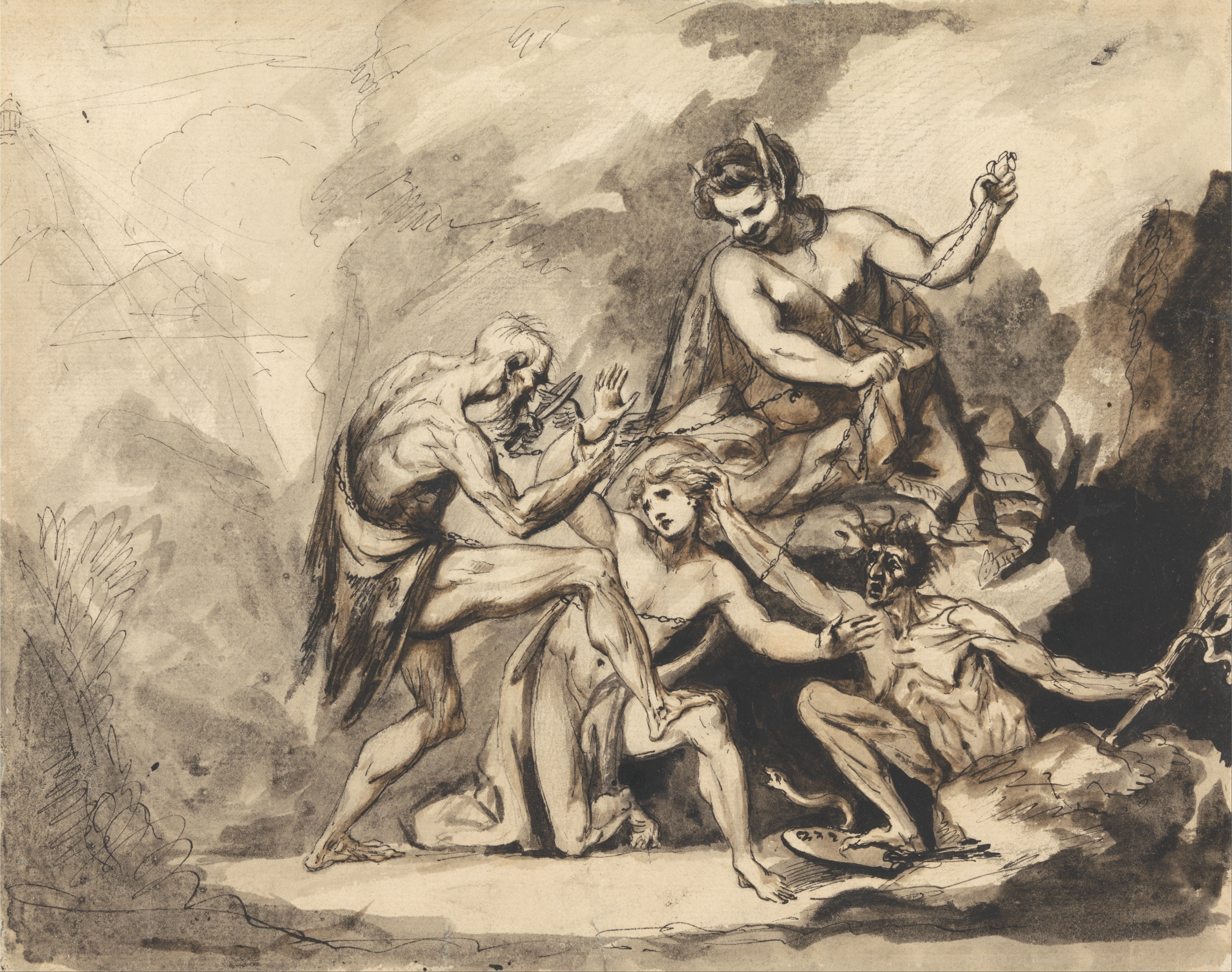
The Artist Assaulted by Time, Ignorance and Envy by Mauritius Lowe, Yale Center for British Art

Mauritius Lowe (1746 – 1793) was a British painter and engraver.

Lowe was one of the first students at the Royal Academy of Arts. While there he was awarded a gold medal, along with John Bacon and James Gandon. As a reward for his performance at the Academy, in 1771 Lowe was offered a "Traveling Studentship", a sponsorship to study art abroad for three years. His allowance was later forfeited however for misconduct. Lowe was friends with the writer and poet Samuel Johnson.
