= Charles Thévenin =

French painter (1764–1838)

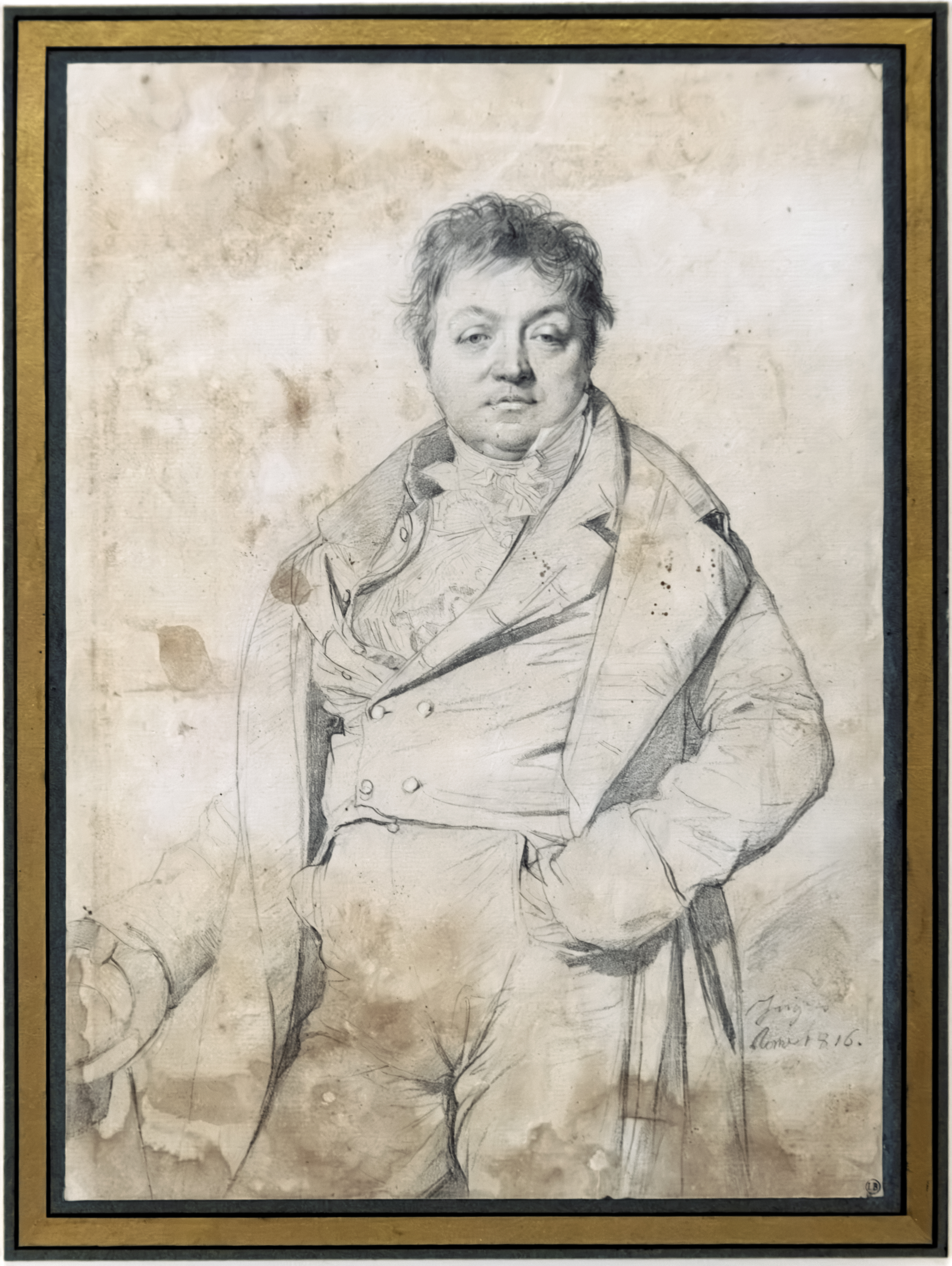
- Portrait by Dominique Ingres, 1816
- Born: Charles Thévenin; 12 July 1764; Paris, France
- Died: 28 February 1838 (aged 73)
- Education: Académie royale de peinture et de sculpture
- Known for: painting
- Movement: Neoclassicism

Charles Thévenin (12 July 1764 – 28 February 1838) was a neoclassical French painter, known for heroic scenes from the time of the French Revolution and First French Empire.

== Biography ==
Born in Paris, the son of a court architect, Charles studied painting at the Académie royale de peinture et de sculpture under François-André Vincent. Winning second prize in the prix de Rome for Joseph recognised by his brothers in 1789, he won first prize in 1791 for Regulus returns to Carthage.

Thus he received his first commissions and in 1790 produced the first version of The Taking of the Bastille, which produced a number of commentaries. He received a second prize at the Concours of Year II for The 12 July 1789.

After giving up history painting for decorative subjects for a time, in 1798 he produced Augereau on the bridge at Arcole, the first in a series of paintings glorifying the Empire. He left for Italy, staying at the French Academy in Rome, meeting Dominique Ingres and becoming the academy's director from 1816 to 1823. On his return to Paris, he was elected a member of the Académie des Beaux-Arts in 1825, then named Conservateur of the Cabinet des estampes in the Bibliothèque nationale.

== Works ==
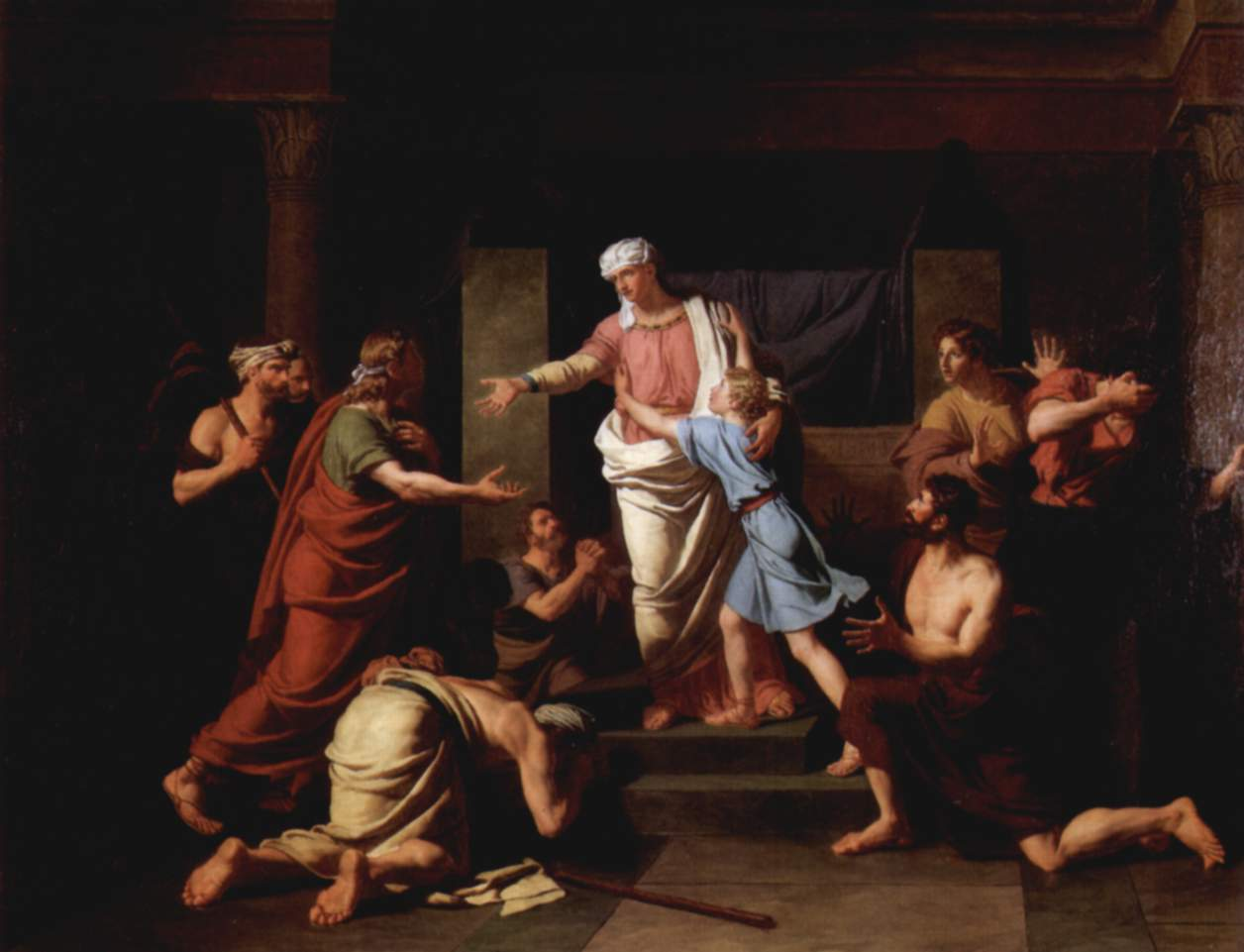
Joseph recognised by his brothers, 1789

- Joseph reconnu par ses frères (1789). Musée des Beaux-Arts, Angers.
- Un vainqueur de la Bastille (1789). Musée Carnavalet, Paris.
- La Vengeance du peuple après la prise de la Bastille ou Assassinat du Marquis de Pelleport (1789–90). Musée Carnavalet, Paris.
- Le Marquis de Launay, gouverneur de la Bastille, capturé par les assaillants le 14 juillet 1789 (1789–93). Musée Carnavalet, Paris.
- La Prise de la Bastille (eau-forte, 1790). Bibliothèque nationale de France, Paris.
- Régulus retourne à Carthage (1791). École nationale supérieure des Beaux-Arts, Paris.
- La Fête de la Fédération, le 14 juillet 1790, au Champ-de-Mars (1792). Musée Carnavalet, Paris.
- Œdipe et Antigone (v. 1795–96). Assemblée nationale, Paris.
- General Augereau at the Bridge of Arcole (1798). Musée national du Château de Versailles.
- Jean-Baptiste de Monet, Chevalier de Lamarck (1802–03).
- Abbaye de St. Martin de Sées (v. 1810).
- The Storming of the Citadel of Ratisbon (1810)
- Reddition de la ville d’Ulm, le 20 octobre 1805, Napoléon Ier recevant la capitulation du général Mack (1815)

== Gallery ==
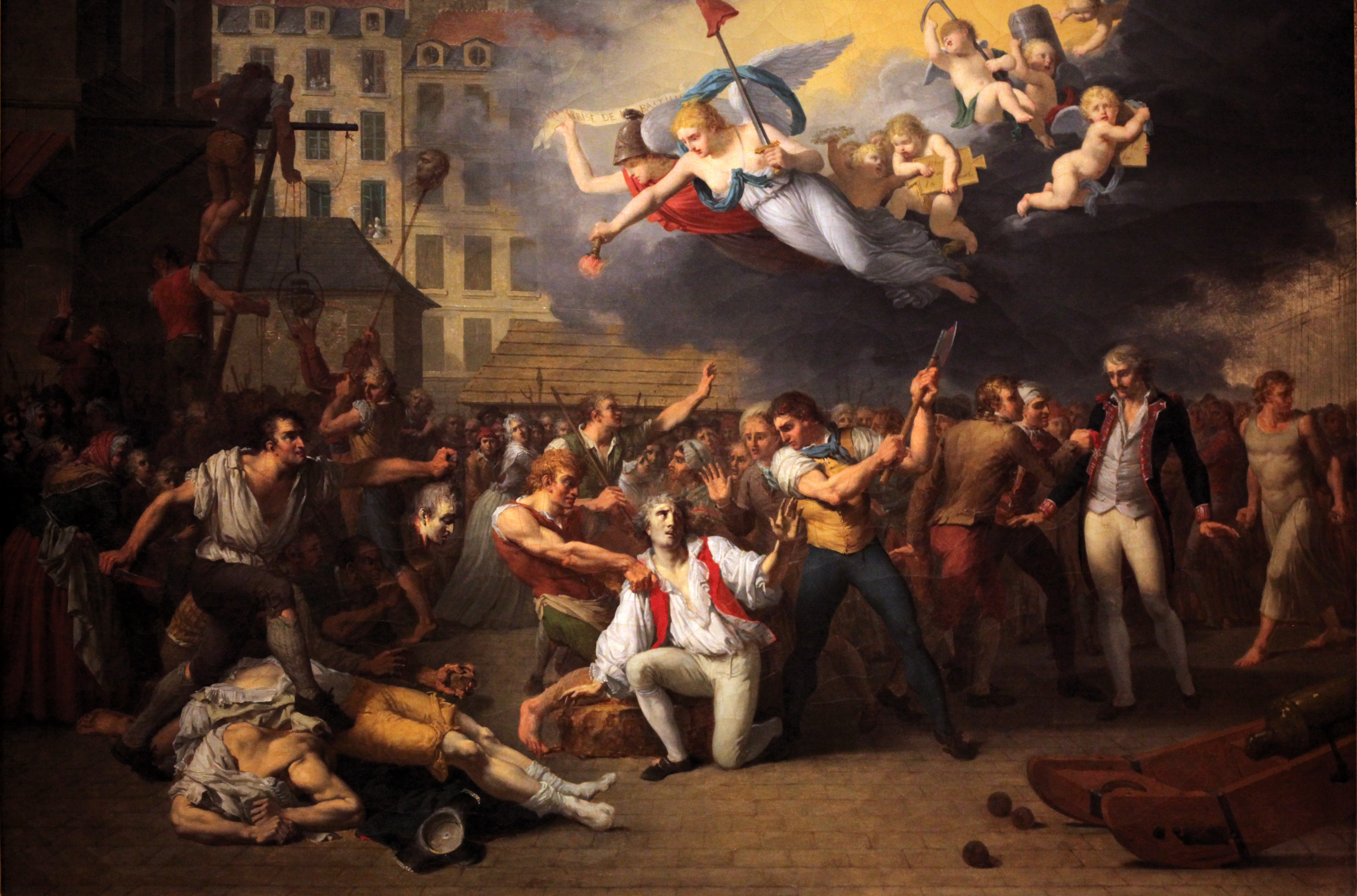
The Marquis de Pelleport Tries in Vain to Save the Life of Antoine-Jérôme de Losme-Salbray (1789)

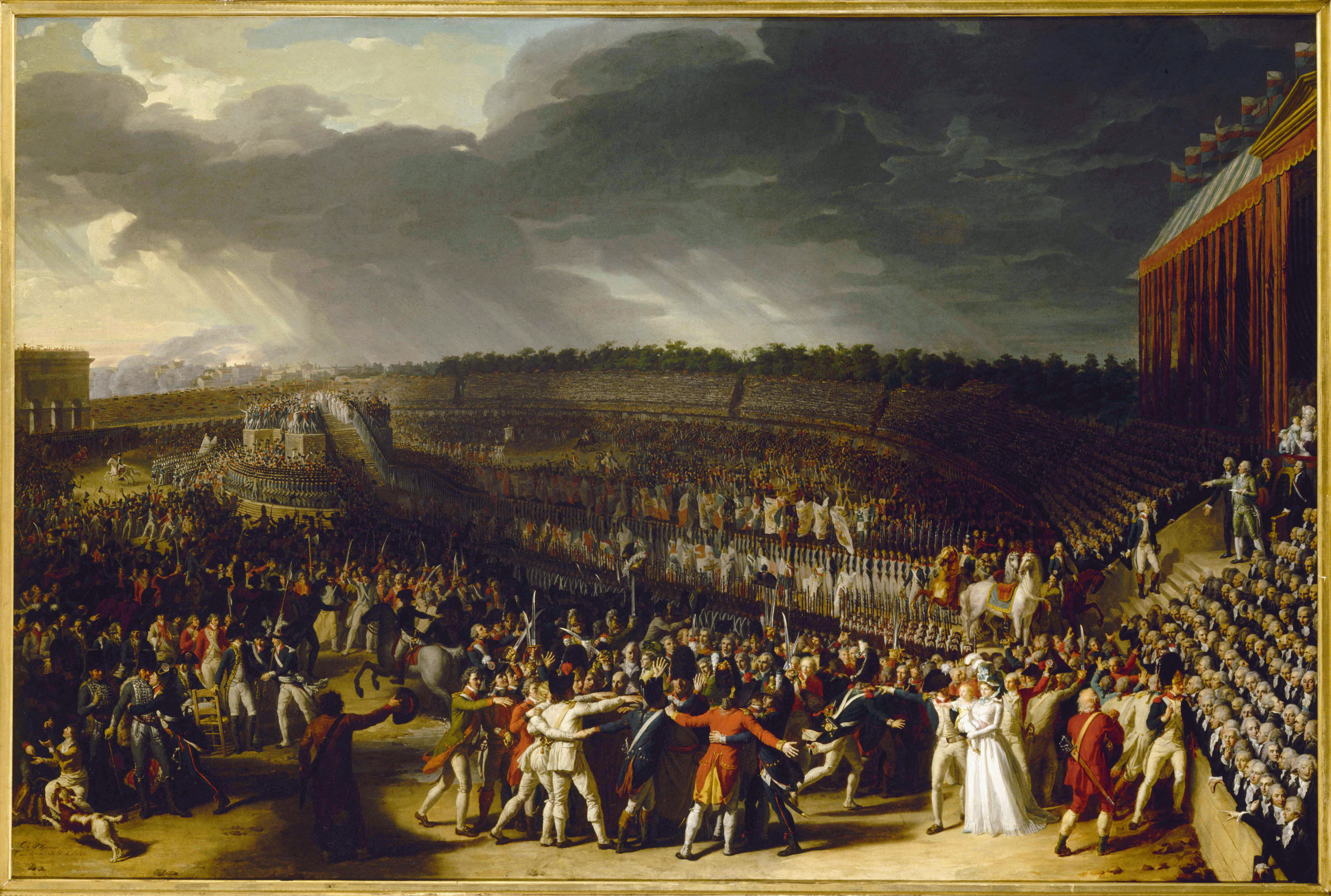
The Festival of the Fédération, 14 July 1790, on the Champ-de-Mars (1792)

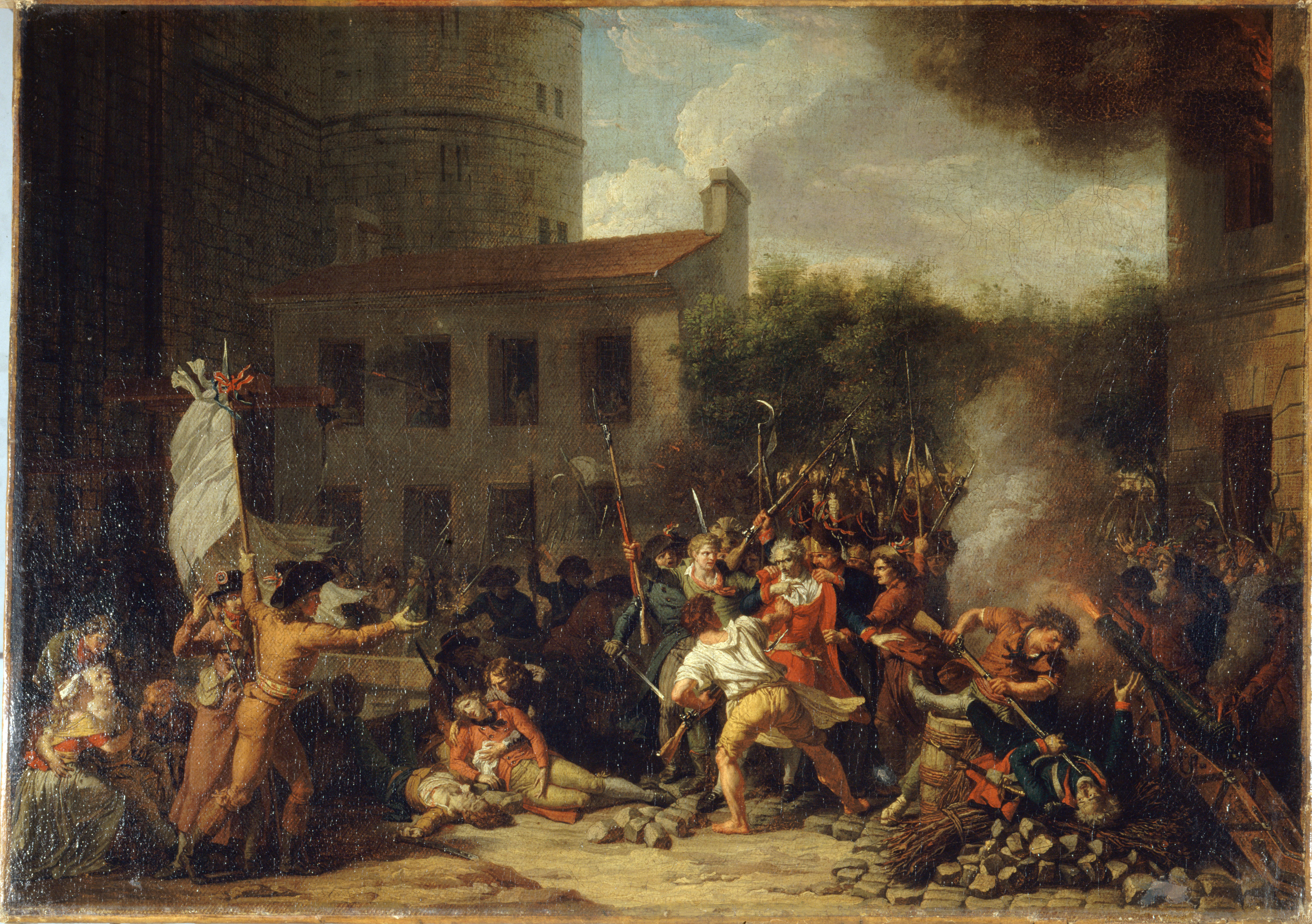
The Storming of the Bastille (1793)

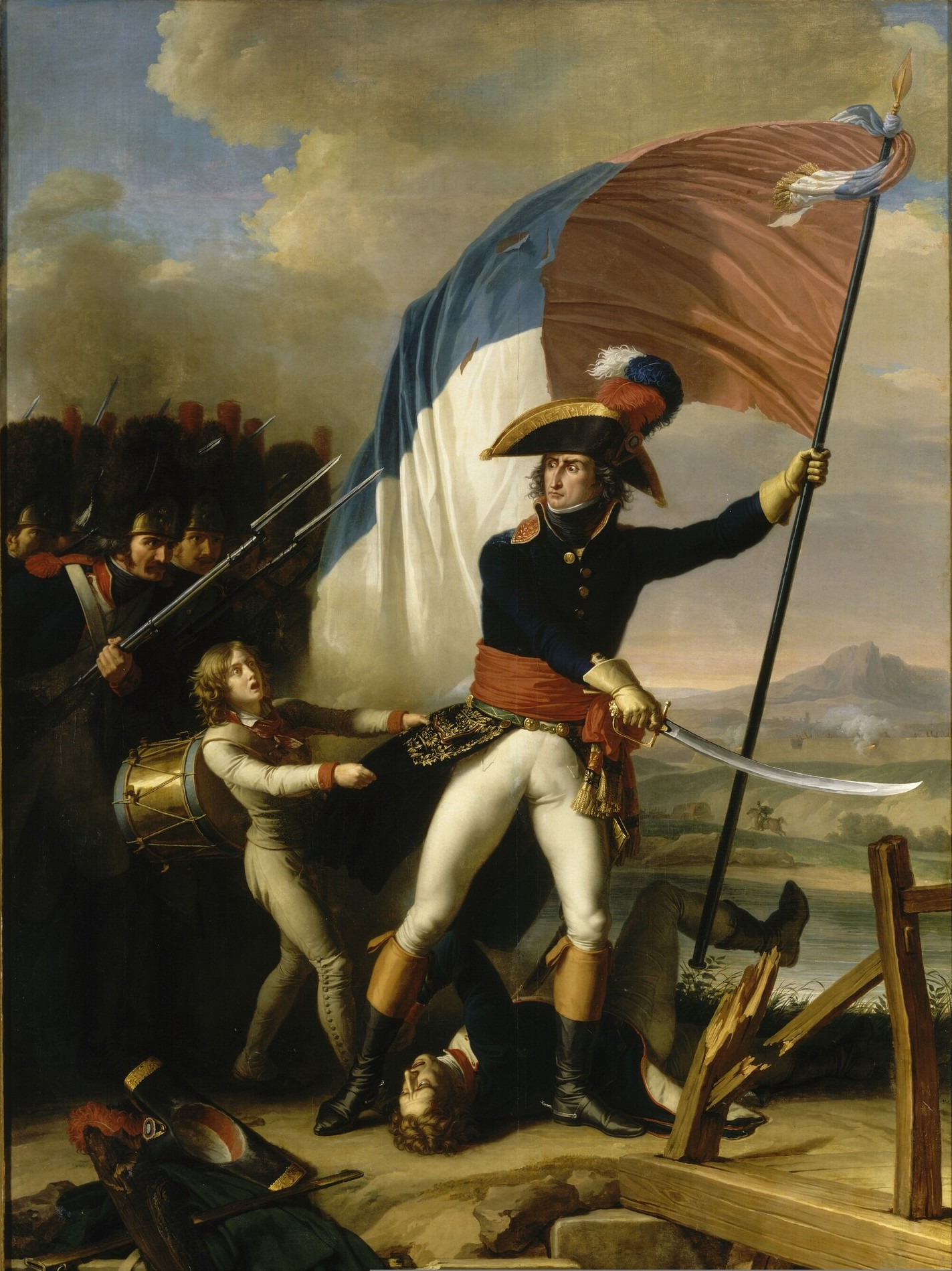
General Augereau at the Bridge of Arcole (1798)

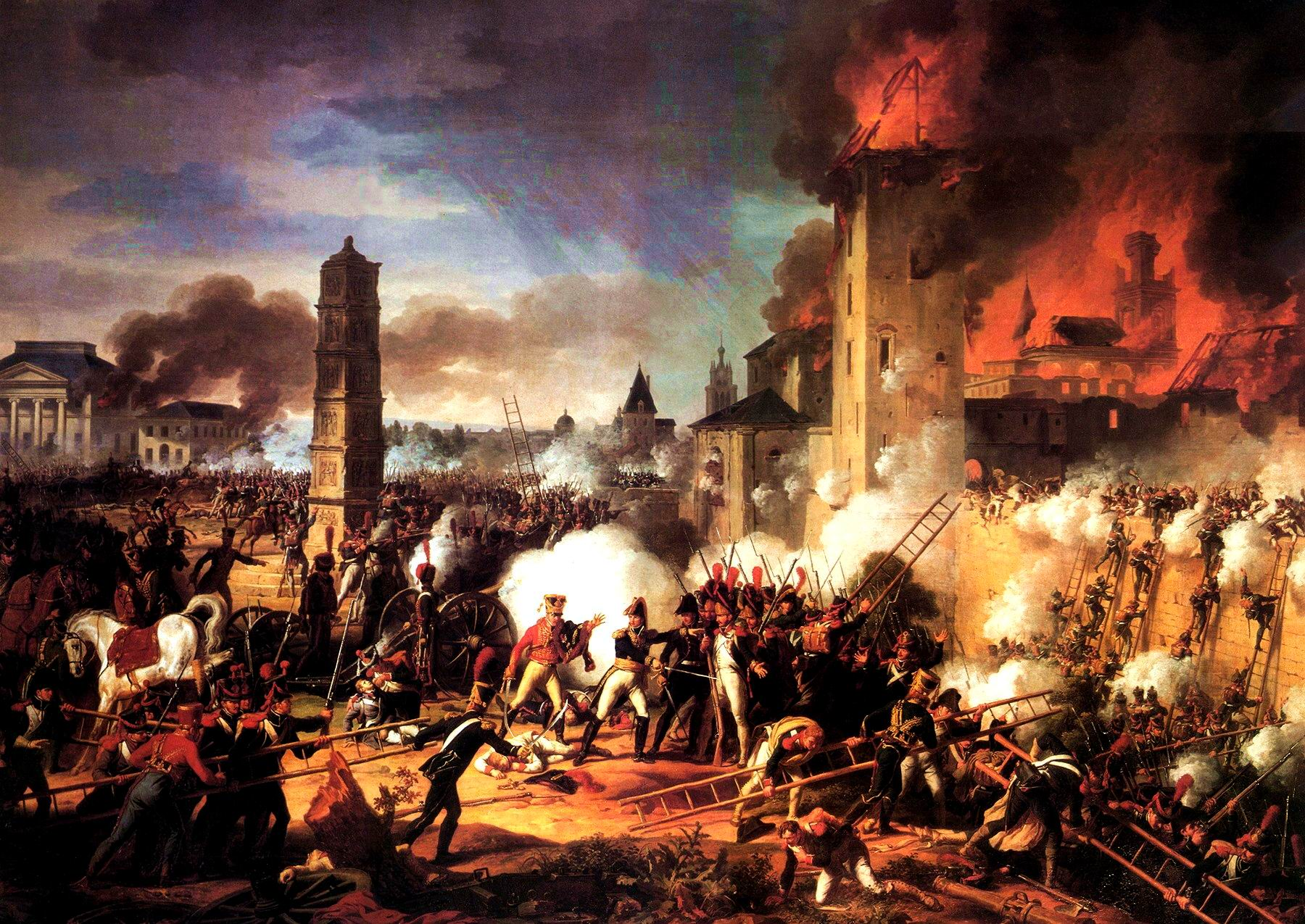
The Storming of the Citadel of Ratisbon (1810)

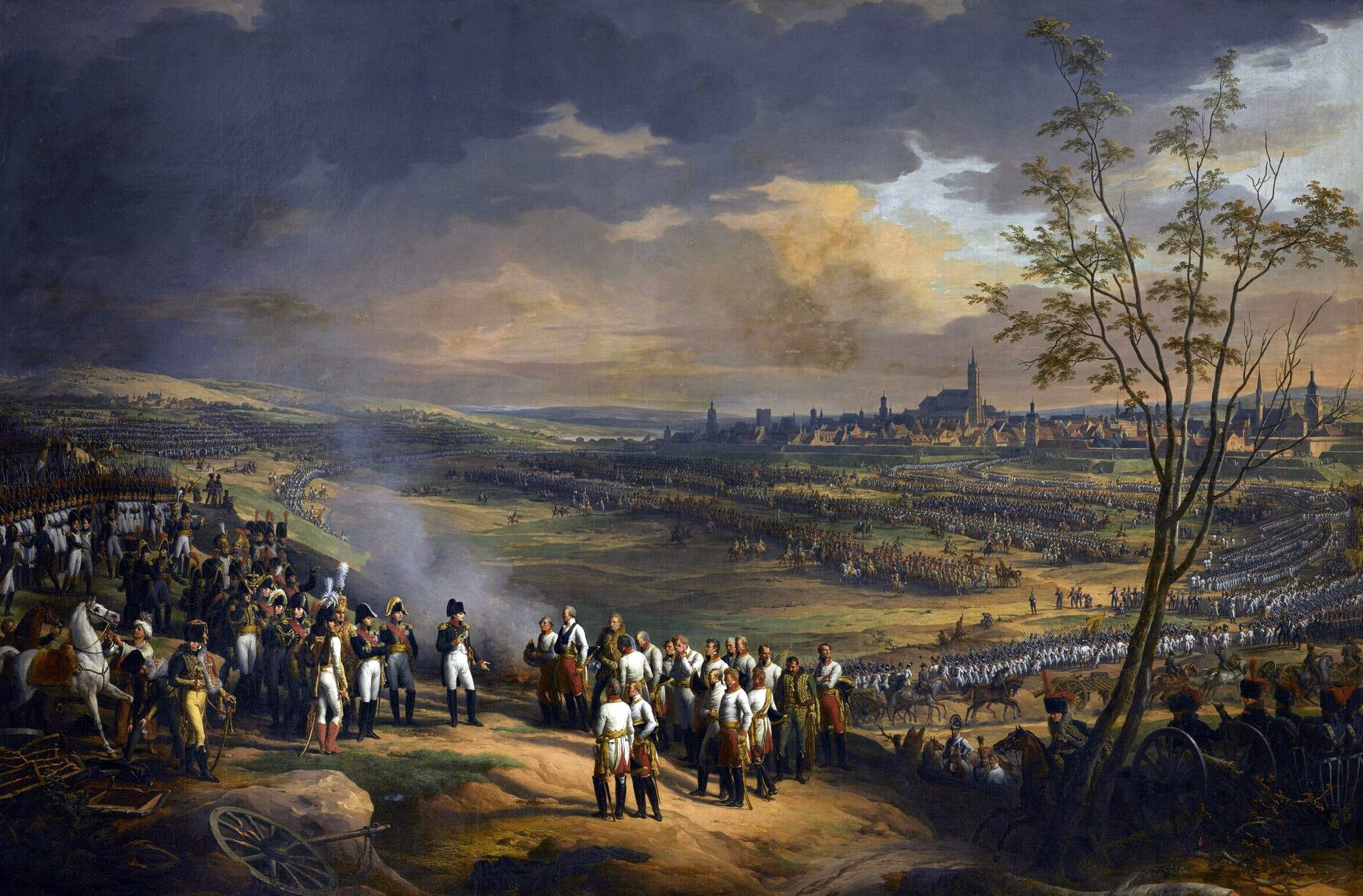
Surrender of the town of Ulm, 20 October 1805, Napoleon I receives the capitulation of general Mack (1815)

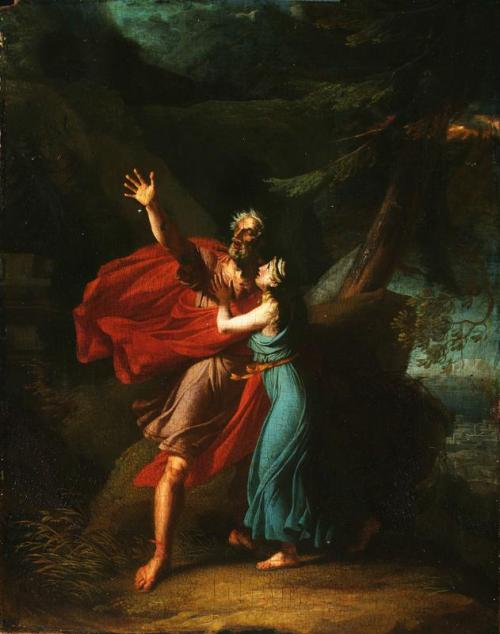
Oedipus and Antigone, Aberdeen Archives, Gallery & Museums Collection

== Bibliography ==
- (in French) François Macé de Lépinay, « Autour de «La Fête de la Fédération», Charles Thévenin et la Révolution 1789-1799 », Revue de l'Art, 1989, vol. 83, pp. 51-60. (online text)
