= Cupid and Psyche (Gérard) =

Painting by François Gérard

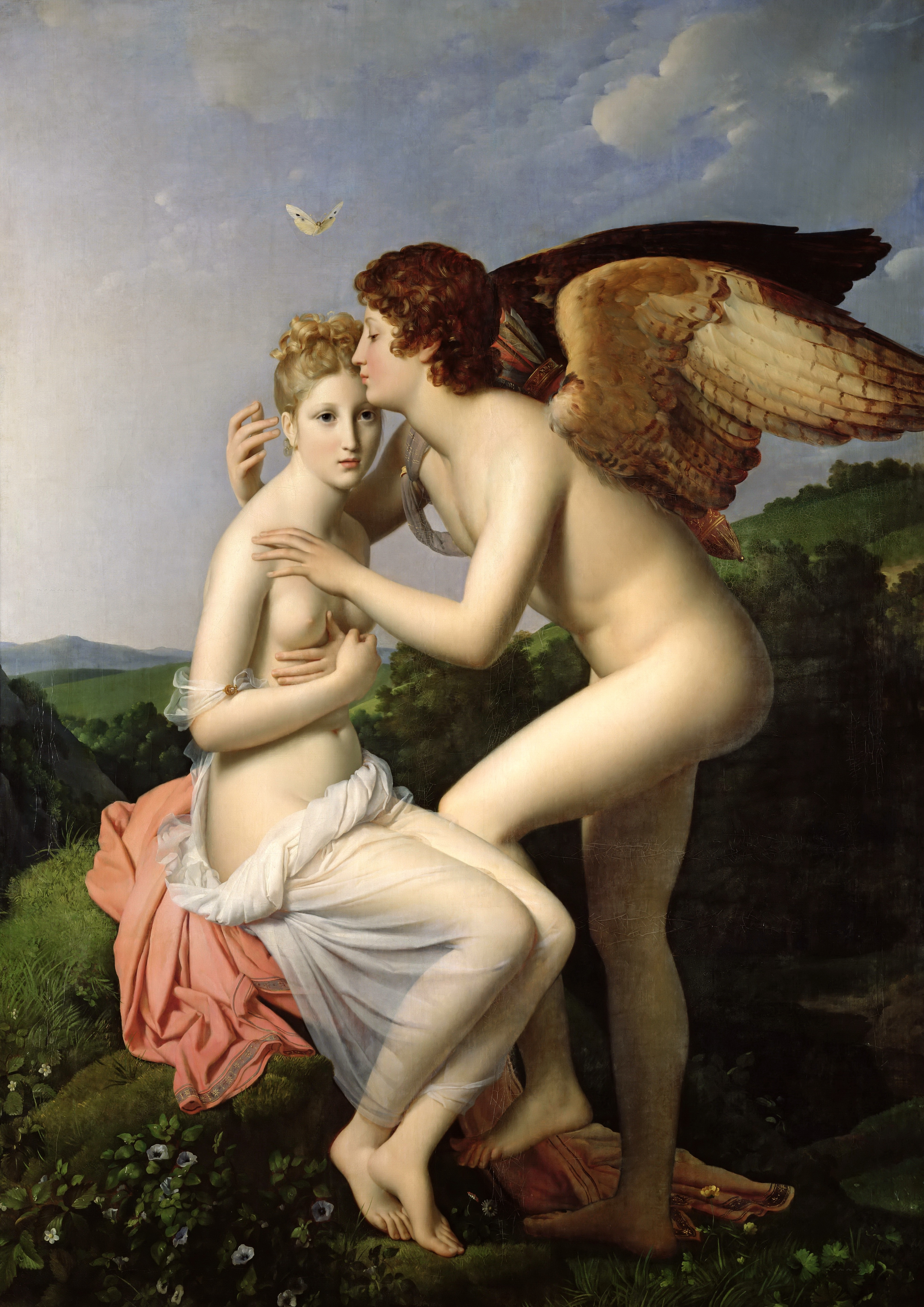
- Artist: François Gérard
- Year: 1798
- Medium: oil on canvas
- Dimensions: 186 cm × 132 cm (73 in × 52 in)
- Location: Louvre; Paris

Cupid and Psyche (or Allegory of Eros and Psyche) is an oil-on-canvas painting by French painter François Gérard, from 1798. It was exhibited for the first time at the Salon of 1798. It is held in the Louvre, in Paris.

== History and description ==
The scene takes place in a green landscape, which serves as the background for the action. The young princess Psyche is depicted here as being somewhat surprised by the first kiss she is receiving from Cupid (or Eros), which remains invisible to her eyes. The ancient myth told here is not only a love story, but also a metaphysical allegory: Psyche is in fact the personification of the human soul, related to the overwhelming passion, and to the libido. This work created by Gérard, who had been a pupil of Jacques-Louis David, testifies the evolution of his neoclassical style.

The relationship depicted in this painting between Cupid and Psyche is inspired by the narrative of the Latin poet Apuleius in The Golden Ass, and was a subject that repeatedly inspired neoclassical painters, sculptors and writers of the late 18th and the early 19th centuries. The gestures of Eros, the god of love, remain measured, almost completely devoid of passion and commitment, as he kisses gently Psyche in the forehead, to her surprise, because she is unable to see him. The lines of the nude bodies reflect carefully the attention that the artist paid to their anatomy. A transparent dress covers the legs of the young woman. Psyche's expression denotes a serene but distant relaxation, as well an effort to hide her feelings. The butterfly seen above Psyche's head symbolizes the soul. The scene is able to express the deepest sensuality, while also maintaining a certain sense of innocence.
