= 1803 in art =

Events in the year 1803 in Art.

== Events ==
- 2 May – The Royal Academy Exhibition of 1803 opens at Somerset House in London
- Summer – The Stafford Gallery at Cleveland House, London, the private art collection of the Marquess of Stafford's family (including many paintings from the Orleans Collection), is first opened to the public (by invitation).

== Works ==
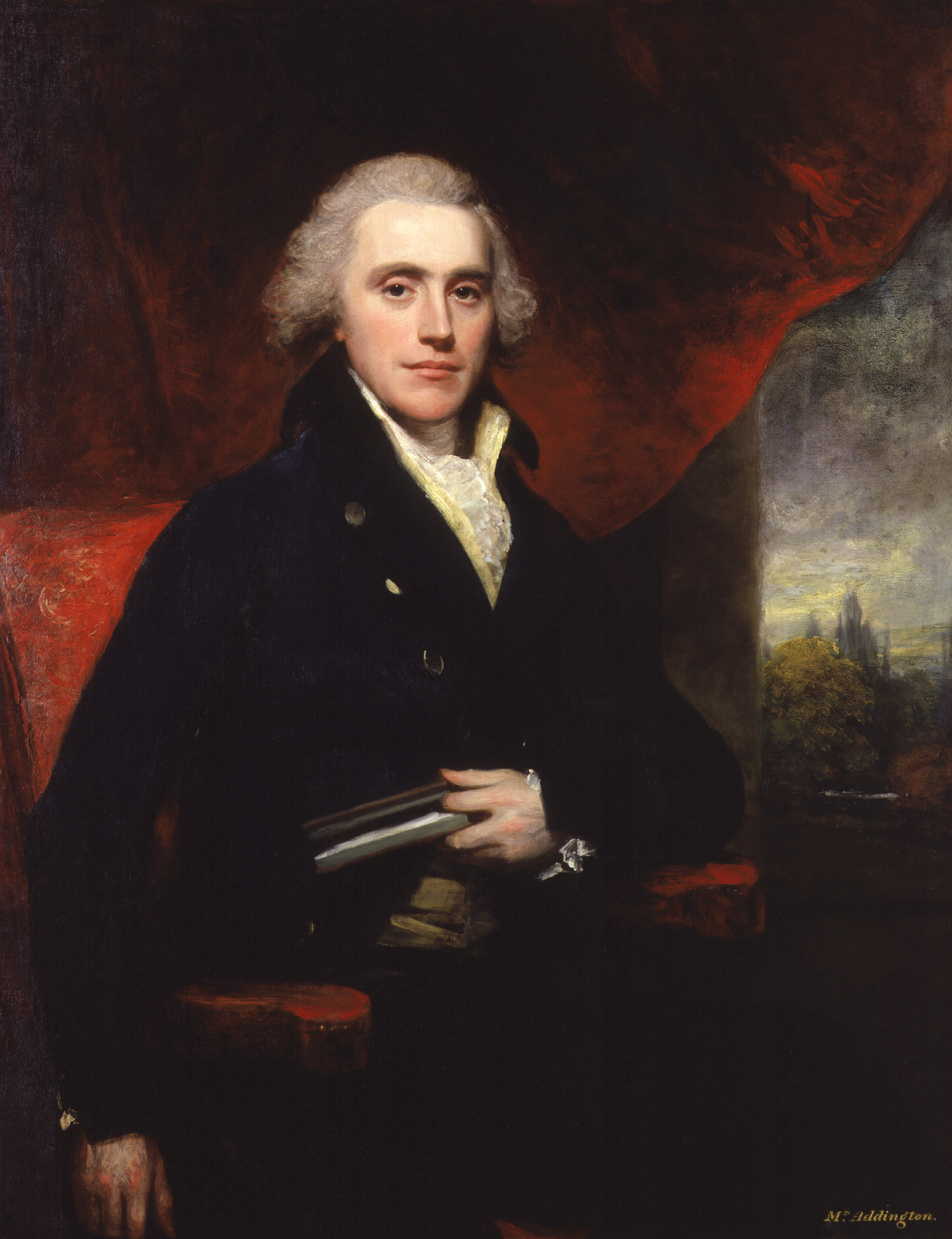
Portrait of Henry Addington by William Beechey.

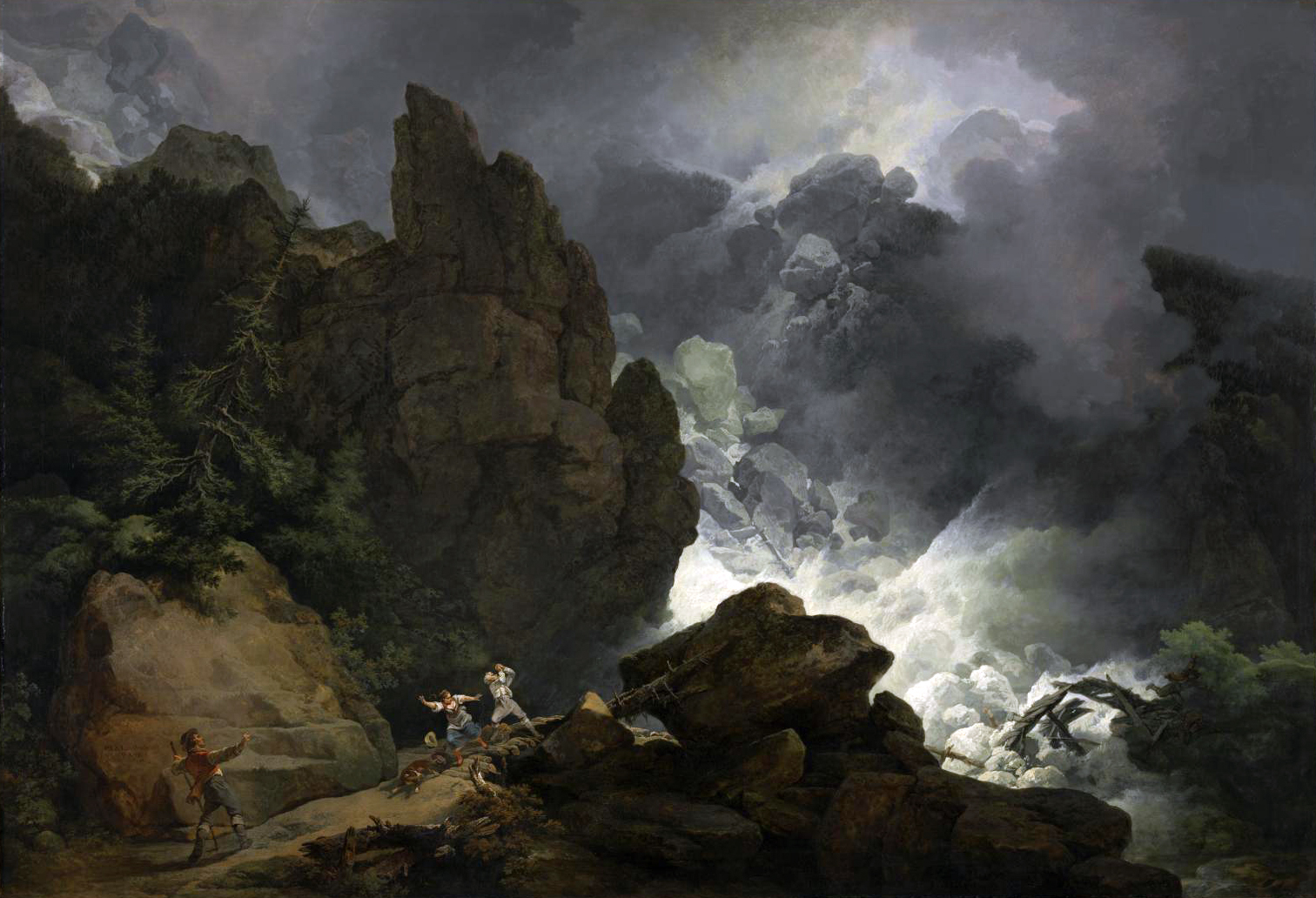
An Avalanche in the Alps by Philip James de Loutherbourg

- James Barry – Self-portrait as Timanthes
- William Beechey – Portrait of Henry AddingtonRoberts, William (1907). Sir William Beechey, R. A. London: Duckworth and Co. p. 215.
- Louis-Léopold Boilly
  - The Arrival of a Stagecoach in the Courtyard of the Messageries
  - Jean-Antoine Houdon modeling the bust of Laplace in his atelier (c.1803-04)
- Adam Buck – Mary Anne Clarke
- John Sell Cotman – watercolours
  - Bedlam Furnace Near Irongate [sic.], Shropshire
  - Ruins of Rievaulx Abbey
- François Gérard
  - Portrait of Letizia Bonaparte
  - Portrait of Mary Nisbet
- Philip James de Loutherbourg – An Avalanche in the Alps
- Henry Fuseli – The Blind Polyphemus, at the Entrance to His Cave, Strokes the Ram under which Odysseus Lies Concealed
- François Gérard – Portrait of Napoleon Bonaparte, First Consul
- Thomas Lawrence – Portrait of Lord Thurlow
- Thomas Douglas Guest – Portrait of Joseph Wilton
- Christian Horneman – Portrait miniature of Ludwig van Beethoven
- William Turner
  - Bonneville, Savoy
  - Calais Pier
  - The Festival of the Opening of the Vintage at Mâcon
  - Fishing Boats Entering Calais Harbour
- Utamaro – Sakizoroi shintaku no kachan ("Array of blooms in the flower beds at the new quarters") (print series; approximate date)
- David Wilkie – Diana and Callisto

== Awards ==
The Prix de Rome is expanded in 1803 to include musical composition as a category.

- Grand Prix de Rome, painting:
- Grand Prix de Rome, sculpture:
- Grand Prix de Rome, architecture:
- Grand Prix de Rome, music: Albert Androt.

== Births ==
- January 18 – Francis Grant, painter (died 1878)
- March 3 – Alexandre-Gabriel Decamps, painter (died 1860)
- May 19 – Martinus Rørbye, Danish genre painter (died 1848)
- June 13 – Treffle Berthlaume, sculptor (died 1884)
- July 24 – Alexander Jackson Davis, architect, illustrator (died 1892)
- August 23 – Egide Charles Gustave Wappers, painter (died 1874)
- September 13 – Jean Ignace Isidore Gérard ("J J Grandville"), caricaturist (died 1847)
- September 28 – Adrian Ludwig Richter, German painter and etcher (died 1884)
- October 3 – Paul Huet, painter (died 1869)
- November 25 – Sofia Ahlbom, Swedish drawing artist, engraver and lithographer (died 1868)

== Deaths ==
- January 8 – Domenico Cunego, Italian printmaker (born 1725)
- January 22 – Giuseppe Baldrighi, Italian painter (born 1722)
- April 21 – John Bogle, Scottish miniature painter (born 1746)
- April 24 – Adélaïde Labille-Guiard, historical and portrait painter (born 1749)
- April 29 – Thomas Jones, Welsh artist of water colours and sketches (born 1742)
- June 14 – José Camarón Bonanat, Spanish painter, mainly active in Valencia (born 1731)
- July 8 – Francesco Giuseppe Casanova, Italian painter and a younger brother of Giacomo Casanova (born 1727)
- November 25 – Joseph Wilton, sculptor (born 1722)
- December 6 – William Verstille, American portrait artist (born 1757)
- date unknown
  - Giuseppe Camerata, Italian miniature painter and engraver (born 1718)
  - Luigi Mayer, Italian-German painter (born 1755)
  - Vasily Rodchev, Russian history painter (born 1768)
  - Giovanni Volpato, Italian engraver, excavator, dealer in antiquities and manufacturer of biscuit porcelain figurines (born 1735)
  - Xi Gang, Chinese calligrapher and painter of the Qing dynasty (born 1746)
