= 1718 in art =

Events from the year 1718 in art.

== Events ==
- Arnold Houbraken publishes his biographical work De groote schouburgh der Nederlantsche konstschilders en schilderessen ("The Great Theatre of Dutch Painters and Woman Artists").

== Paintings ==
- Nicolas Lancret – Italian Comedians by a Fountain
- Jonathan Richardson – Alexander Pope and his dog, Bounce
- Jacob van Schuppen – Portrait of Eugene of Savoy
- Antoine Watteau – La Surprise

== Births ==
- January – Johann Melchior Kambly, Swiss sculptor who took part in the development of the architectural style of Frederician Rococo (died 1783)
- April 24 – Nathaniel Hone, Irish-born painter (died 1784)
- June 5 – Thomas Chippendale, English furniture maker (died 1779)
- July 4 – Giambettino Cignaroli, Italian painter of the Rococo and early Neoclassic period (d. 1770)
- July 15 – Alexander Roslin, Swedish portrait painter (died 1793)
- August 16 – Jakob Emanuel Handmann, Swiss painter (died 1781)
- August 28 – Claude-Henri Watelet, French fermier-général, amateur painter and writer on the arts (died 1786)
- September 25 – Martin Johann Schmidt, Austrian painter (died 1801)
- October 17 – Christoffer Foltmar, Danish painter of miniatures and organist (died 1759)
- date unknown
  - Joseph Bergler the Elder, Austrian sculptor (died 1788)
  - Giuseppe Camerata, Italian miniature painter and engraver (died 1803)
  - Nicolas Desportes, French painter of hunting scenes (died 1787)
  - James Giles, English artist in Worcester, Derby, Bow and Chelsea porcelain and also glass (died 1780)
  - Maria Maddalena Baldacci, Italian painter born in Florence (died 1782)
- probable – Agostino Carlini, Italian sculptor and painter (died 1790)

== Deaths ==
- May 24 – Jeremiah Dummer, American silversmith and portrait painter (born 1645)) was the first American-born silversmith,
- May 29 – Giuseppe Avanzi, Italian painter (born 1645)
- December 25 – Franz Joseph Feuchtmayer, German sculptor and stuccoist (born 1660)
- December 28 – Jan Brokoff, German sculptor (born 1652)
- date unknown
  - Jan Griffier, Dutch painter (born c. 1645–1652)
  - Juan Simón Gutiérrez, Spanish Baroque painter (born 1634)
  - Kanō Tanshin, Japanese painter (born 1653)
  - Wu Li, Chinese landscape painter and poet during the Qing Dynasty (born 1632)
- probable
  - Josias English, English etcher (born unknown)
  - Giuseppe Laudati, Italian painter of the Baroque period (born 1672)
  - Girolamo Odam, Italian painter, pastel portraitist and landscape artist, as well as wood engraver (born 1681)
  - Pasquale Rossi, Italian painter of the Baroque period (born 1641)
