= 1884 in art =

Events from the year 1884 in art.

== Events ==
- February 2 – First annual exhibition of Les XX opens at the Palais des Beaux-Arts in Brussels. Artists invited to show in addition to members of the group include Auguste Rodin, James McNeill Whistler and Max Liebermann.
- March – Theo van Gogh starts buying and selling Impressionist works, beginning with a painting by Pissarro.
- April – Camille Pissarro moves to Éragny-sur-Epte.
- May 1 – The Salon of 1884 opens in Paris
- May 15–July 15 – Groupe des Artistes Indépendants stages the first officially sanctioned open exhibition of contemporary art in Paris, including the first showing of Seurat's Bathers at Asnières.
- July 29 – Société des Artistes Indépendants established in Paris under the leadership of Albert Dubois-Pillet.
- August 30 – Austrian painter Marianne Preindlsberger marries English painter Adrian Scott Stokes.
- Summer – Seurat begins work on A Sunday Afternoon on the Island of La Grande Jatte.

== Works ==
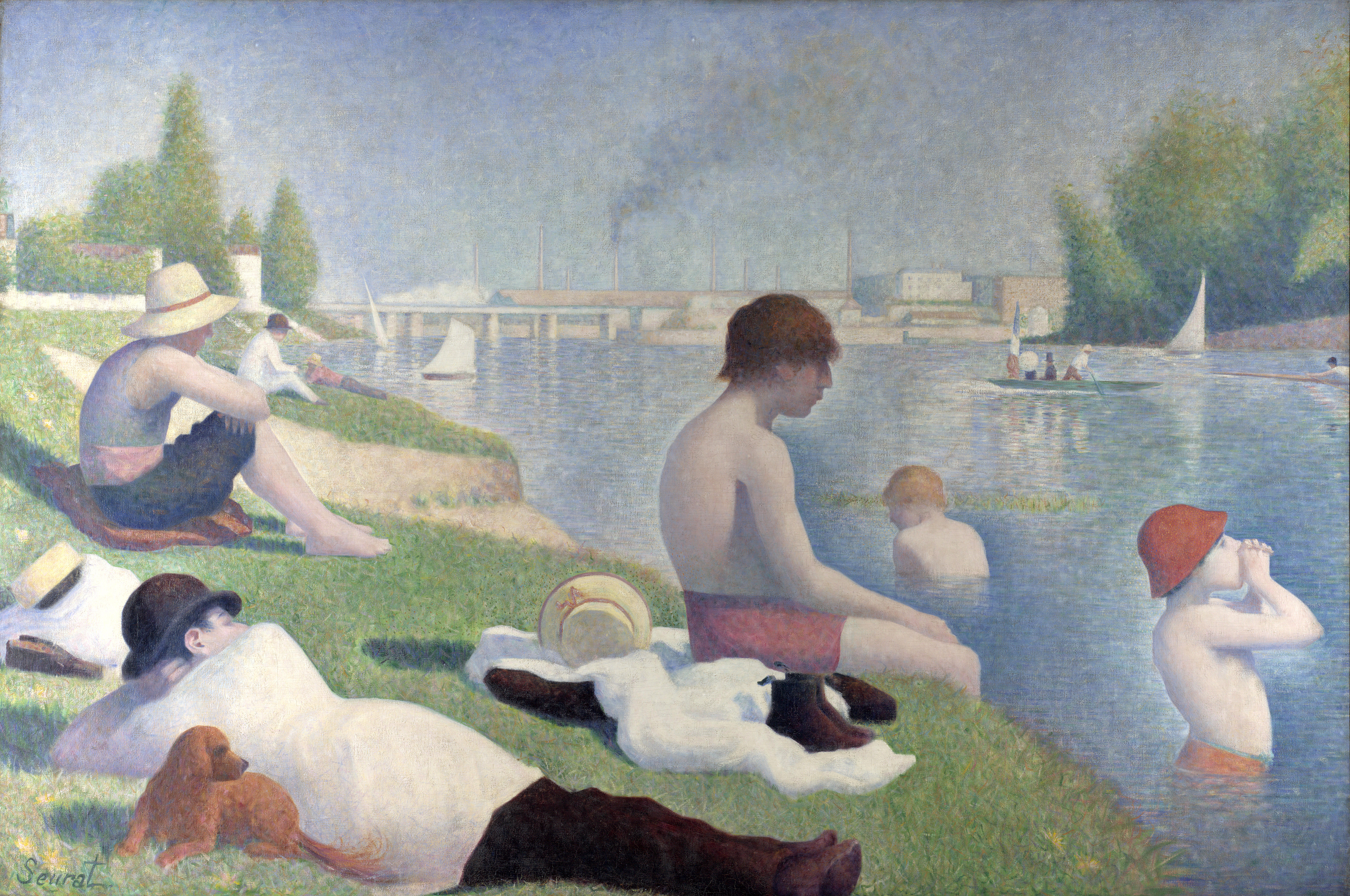
Seurat – Bathers at Asnières

- Michael Ancher – Portrait of my wife, the painter Anna Ancher
- Henry Baerer – Ludwig van Beethoven (bronze sculpture, version for Central Park, New York City)
- Marie Bashkirtseff – The Meeting
- Anna Bilińska-Bohdanowicz – A Negress
- Jules Breton – The Song of the Lark
- Gustave Caillebotte
  - Houses at Trouville
  - Man at his bath
  - Man wearing a blouse
  - The Yellow Fields at Gennevilliers
- Gustaf Cederström – Funeral procession of King Charles XII
- Giuseppe De Nittis – Breakfast in the Garden
- Albert Edelfelt – Boys Playing on the Shore
- Daniel Chester French – John Harvard (bronze sculpture)
- Jean-Léon Gérôme – A Roman Slave Market
- Alfred Gilbert – sculptures
  - Icarus
  - Study of a Head
- John Atkinson Grimshaw – The Thames by Moonlight with Southwark Bridge
- Félix Resurrección Hidalgo – Las Virgenes Cristianas Expuestas al Populacho
- Henry Holiday – Dante and Beatrice
- John Lavery
  - On the Bridge at Grez
  - Under the Cherry Tree
- Frederic Leighton – Cymon and Iphigenia
- John Seymour Lucas – After Culloden, Rebel Hunting
- Juan Luna – Spoliarium
- Jean-Louis-Ernest Meissonier – The Siege of Paris in 1870
- John Everett Millais
  - An Idyll of 1745
  - Message from the Sea
- Albert Joseph Moore – Reading Aloud
- Edvard Munch – Morning
- John O'Connor – From Pentonville Road looking west, evening
- Anna Petersen – Breton Girl Looking After Plants in the Hothouse
- Armand Point – La Joie des choses
- Edward Poynter – Diadumenè
- Medardo Rosso – Flesh of Others (wax sculpture)
- John Singer Sargent
  - Auguste Rodin
  - Portrait of Madame X
- Giovanni Segantini - The Bad Mothers
- Georges Seurat – Bathers at Asnières
- Alfred Sisley – The Port of Moret-sur-Loing
- Marie Spartali Stillman – Madonna Pietra degli Scrovigni
- Marianne Stokes – Reflection
- Abbott Handerson Thayer – The Sisters
- Félix Vallotton - Study of Buttocks (c.)
- Vasily Vereshchagin – Blowing from Guns in British India
- Jan Voerman – Days of Mourning
- James McNeill Whistler – The Chelsea Girl

== Births ==
- February 5 – Vlastislav Hofman, Czech painter and architect (died 1964)
- February 12
  - Marie Vassilieff, Russian-French painter (died 1957)
  - Max Beckmann, German painter (died 1950)
- May 11 – Stanley Anderson, English engraver (died 1966)
- June 19 – Georges Ribemont-Dessaignes, French writer and artist (died 1974)
- June 25 – Daniel-Henry Kahnweiler, German-born French art dealer (died 1979)
- June 30 – Jovan Bijelić, Serbian painter (died 1964).
- July 7 – André Dunoyer de Segonzac, French painter and graphic artist (died 1974)
- July 12 – Amedeo Modigliani, Italian-born painter and sculptor (died 1920)
- September 1 – Hilda Rix Nicholas, Australian painter (died 1961)
- October 6 – MacDonald Gill, English designer (died 1947)
- November 14 – Derwent Lees, Australian artist (died 1931)
- December 12 (November 30 O.S.) – Zinaida Serebriakova, Russian-born painter (died 1967)
- December 15 – Eugeniusz Zak, Belarusian-born painter (died 1926)
- December 17 – Waldo Peirce, American painter (died 1970)

== Deaths ==
- January 9 – Vito D'Ancona, Italian painter (born 1825)
- January 28 – Alexander Louis Leloir, French painter (born 1843)
- June 13 – Anton Zwengauer, German painter (born 1810)
- June 19 – Adrian Ludwig Richter, German painter and etcher (born 1803)
- October 1 – Theodor Martens, German painter (born 1822)
- October 3 – Hans Makart, Austrian painter and designer (born 1840)
- October 22 – Treffle Berthlaume, Québécois sculptor (born 1803)
- October 31 – Marie Bashkirtseff, Ukrainian-French painter, of TB (born 1858)
- date unknown
  - Stanisław Chlebowski, Polish painter, especially of oriental themes (born 1835)
  - Lina von Perbandt, German landscape painter (born 1836)
  - Carlo Randanini, Italian painter (year of birth unknown)
