= John Cousen =

John Cousen (Bradford 1804–1880 London) was a British landscape engraver.

He was articled to John Scott, the animal engraver. His larger works after Turner, Stanfield, and others are of great excellence, but his exquisite taste is best displayed in his smaller plates after Turner, especially those in the 'Rivers of France,' which are full of poetic feeling. Cousen worked extensively for The Art Journal. He died at South Norwood, south London in 1880, but had retired from the practice of his art some sixteen years before, in consequence of ill-health.

His more important works are:

- Mercury and Herse; after Turner.
- Towing the Victory into Gibraltar; after Stanfield.
- The Morning after the Wreck; after the same.

After Turner, for the Turner Gallery:

- Calais Pier: Fishing-Boats off Calais.
- Snow-Storm: Hannibal and his Army crossing the Alps.
- Peace: Burial at Sea of the Body of Sir David Wilkie.
- St. Michael's Mount, Cornwall.

For the Vernon Gallery:

- The Battle of Trafalgar; after Stanfield.
- The Canal of the Giudecca and Church of the Jesuits, Venice; after the same.
- The Old Pier at Littlehampton; after Sir A. W. Callcott.
- Returning from Market; after the same.
- Cattle: Early Morning on the Cumberland Hills; after T. Sidney Cooper.
- The Mountain Torrent; after Sir E. Landseer.
- The Cover Side; after F. R. Lee.
- Rest in the Desert; after W. J. Müller.
- A Woodland View; after Sir D. Wilkie.
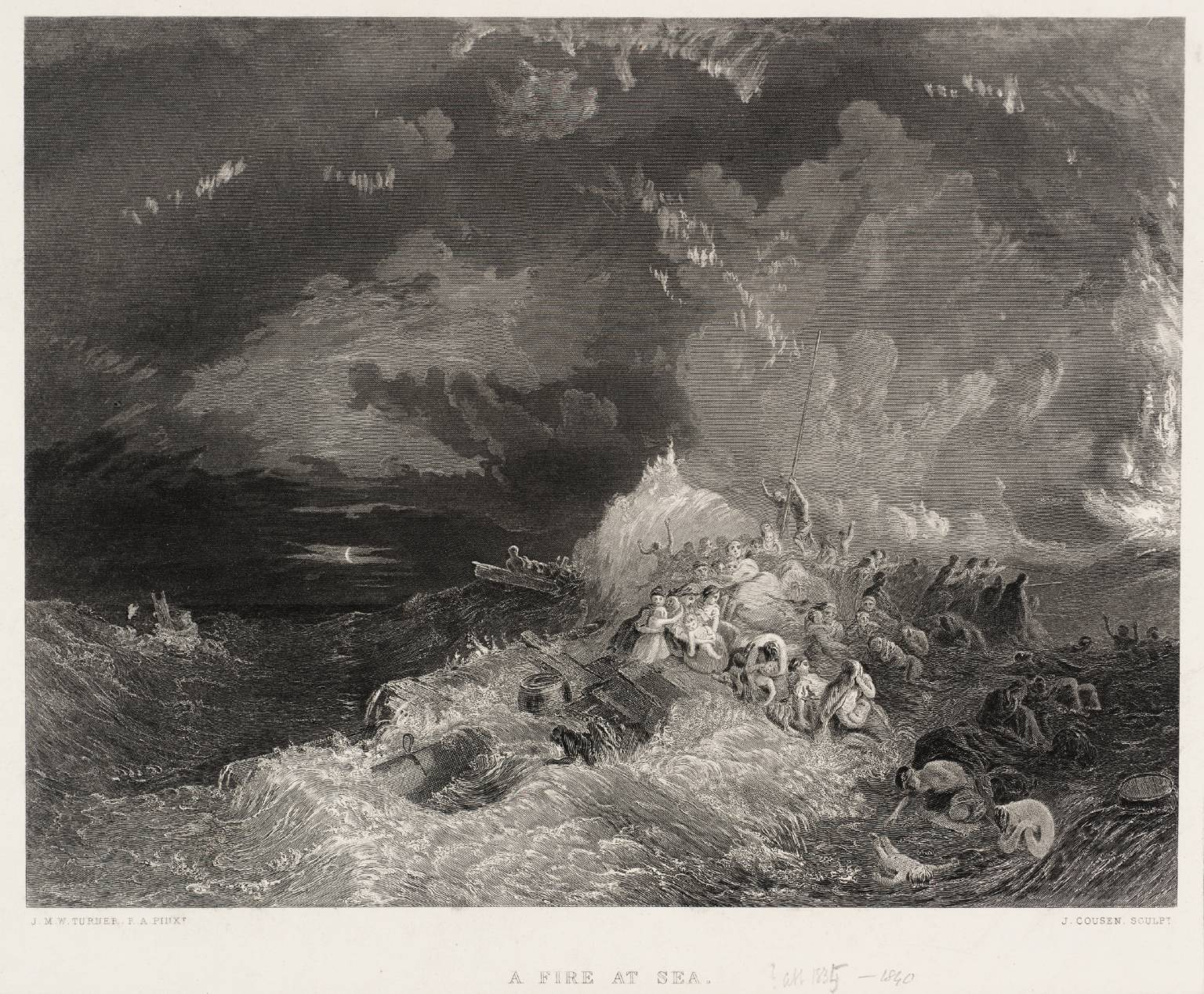
John Cousen: A Fire at Sea (after William Turner's unfinished painting of the same name, probably based on the foundering of the English convict ship Amphitrite)
