= Fishing Boats Entering Calais Harbour =

Painting by J. M. W. Turner

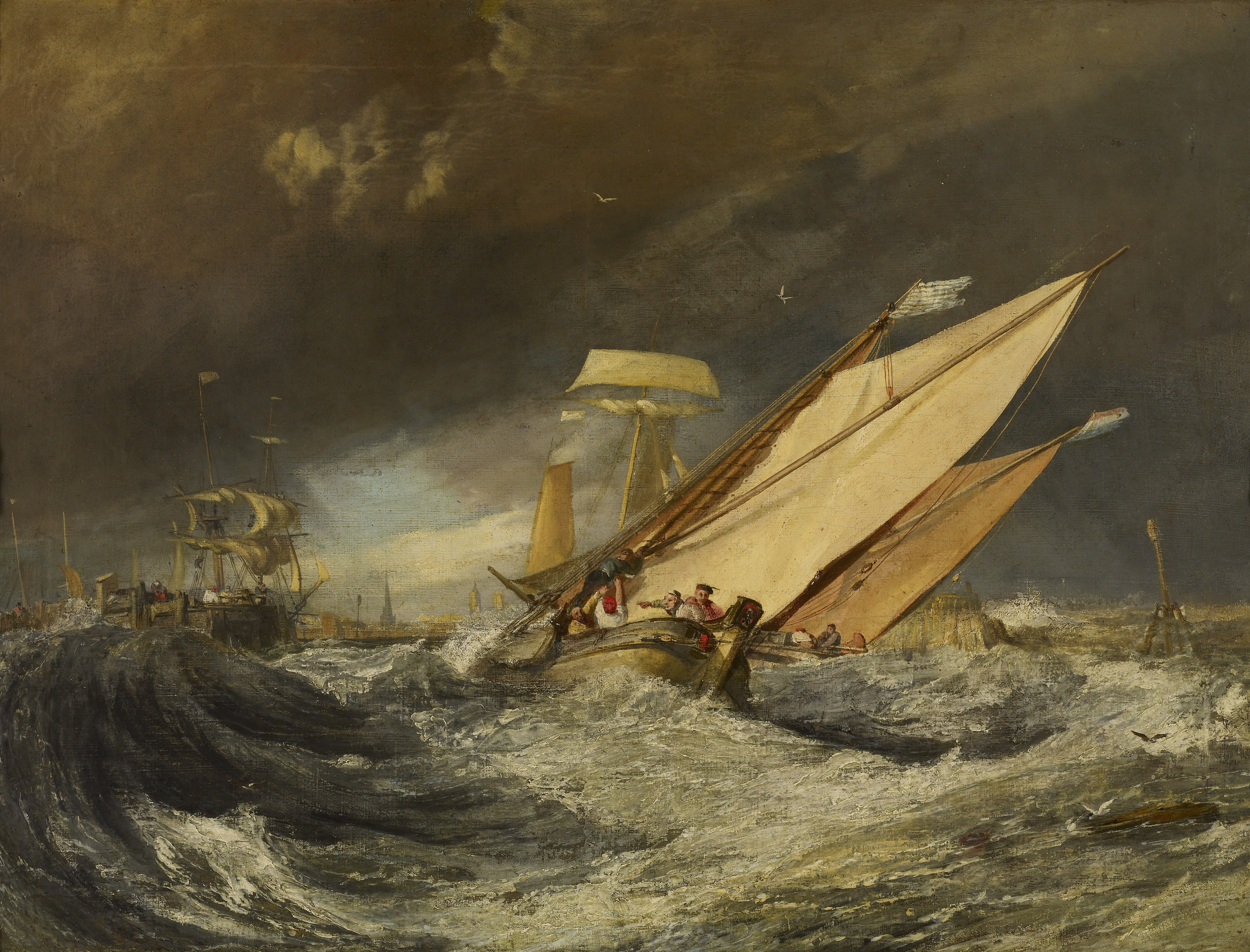
- Artist: J. M. W. Turner
- Year: c.1803
- Type: Oil on canvas, landscape painting
- Dimensions: 73.7 cm × 98.4 cm (29.0 in × 38.7 in)
- Location: Frick Collection; New York City

Fishing Boats Entering Calais Harbour is an 1803 landscape painting by the British artist J.M.W. Turner. During stormy weather, fishing boats return to the port of Calais. Turner had visited the town in 1802 during the Peace of Amiens before the outbreak of the Napoleonic Wars. As well as this picture he also created the larger Calais Pier, now in the National Gallery in London. Turner produced a later print inspired by the painting Entrance of Calais Harbour, which he included in his Liber Studiorum.

Today the painting is in the Frick Collection in New York City, having been one of five Turners acquired by Henry Clay Frick between 1901 and 1914.

== See also ==
- List of paintings by J. M. W. Turner

== Bibliography ==
- Bachrach, Fred G.H. Turner's Holland. Tate Gallery, 1994.
- Bailey, Anthony. J.M.W. Turner: Standing in the Sun. Tate Enterprises Ltd, 2013.
- Bryant, Juliua. Kenwood: Catalogue of Paintings in the Iveagh Bequest. Yale University Pewss, 2003.
- Kelly, Franklin & Warrell, Ian. J.M.W. Turner. Tate Publishing, 2009.
- Shanes, Eric. The Life and Masterworks of J.M.W. Turner. Parkstone International, 2012.
