= Diana and Callisto (Wilkie) =

Painting by David Wilkie

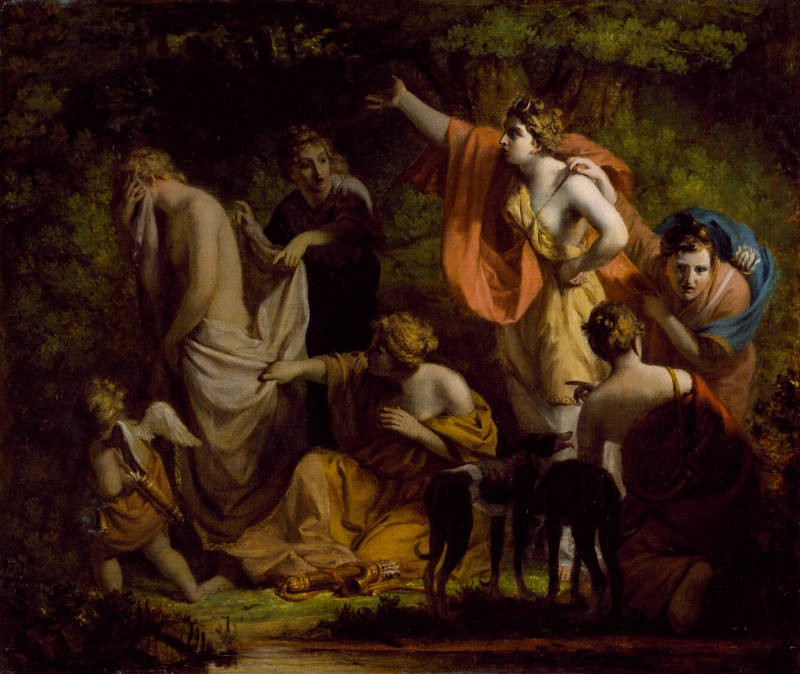
- Artist: David Wilkie
- Year: 1803
- Medium: Oil on canvas
- Dimensions: 64.1 cm × 76.8 cm (25.2 in × 30.2 in)
- Location: Chrysler Museum of Art, Norfolk

Diana and Callisto is an oil painting on canvas by the Scottish artist David Wilkie, from 1803. It was based on a theme from Roman mythology.

== History and description ==
Produced when the artist was a student at the Trustees' Academy in Edinburgh, it depicts the moment a furious Diana discovers that her maid Callisto has become pregnant by Jupiter. Diana looks enraged with what happened, while Callisto covers her tearful face in embarrassment.

The subject of Diana and Callisto was chosen for that year's competition by the Academy. Wilkie won first prize and within two years he was to move to London where his genre scenes enjoyed success at the Royal Academy. The work remained in Wilkie's possession until his death in 1841. Today the painting is in the Chrysler Museum of Art in Norfolk, having been given by Walter P. Chrysler Jr. in 1971.

A chalk study for the painting is in the collection of the Scottish National Gallery, in Edinburgh.

== Bibliography ==
- Macmillan, Duncan. Scottish Art, 1460-2000. Mainstream Publishing, 2000.
- Tromans, Nicholas. David Wilkie: The People's Painter. Edinburgh University Press, 2007.
