= An Avalanche in the Alps =

Painting by Philip James de Loutherbourg

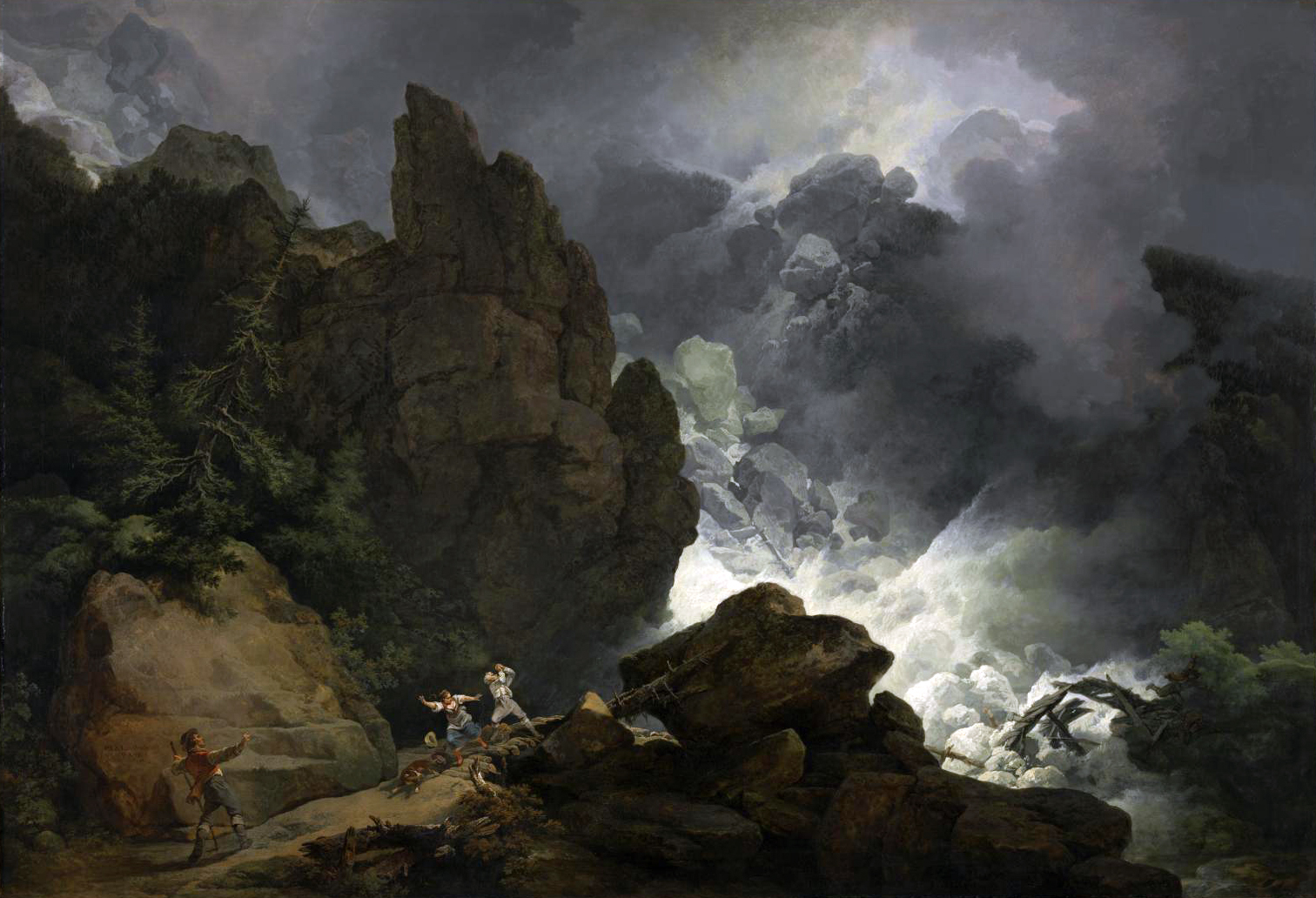
- Artist: Philip James de Loutherbourg
- Year: 1803
- Type: Oil on canvas, landscape painting
- Dimensions: 111 cm × 160 cm (44 in × 63 in)
- Location: Tate Britain, London

An Avalanche in the Alps is an oil on canvas landscape painting by the French-born British artist Philip James de Loutherbourg, from 1803. Painted in the emerging style of romanticism it depicts an avalanche in the mountains of the Alps. Loutherbourg adds narrative to the painting by having tiny figures in the foreground recoiling from the impending avalanche.

It was one of two depictions of avalanches that Loutherbourg produced around this time, but he had long depicted storms and other natural disasters in his work.It was exhibited at the Royal Academy's 1804 Summer Exhibition at Somerset House and was quickly sold to the art collector John Leicester. Today it is in the collection of the Tate Britain in Pimlico, having been acquired in 1965.

== Bibliography ==
- Andrews, Malcolm. Landscape and Western Art. Oxford University Press, 1999.
- Morawińska, Agnieszka . Romanticism. Dom Polski, 1999.
- Murray, Christopher John. Encyclopedia of the Romantic Era, 1760-1850, Volume 2. Taylor & Francis, 2004.
- Pipes, Alan. Foundations of Art and Design. Laurence King Publishing, 2003.
- Preston, Lillian Elvira. Philippe Jacques de Loutherbourg: Eighteenth Century Romantic Artist and Scene Designer. University of Florida, 1977.
