= Carlo Randanini =

Italian painter

Carlo Randanini (died 1884) was an Italian painter, in oil and watercolor, mainly of genre subjects, including costume genre.

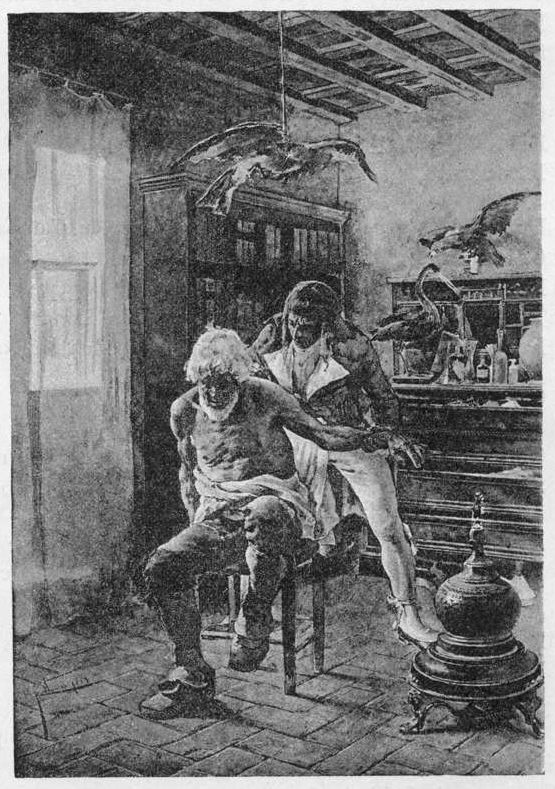
A Surgical Operation

== Biography ==
He was a resident of Rome, where he was born and completed his studies. In 1881 at Milan, he displayed a canvas depicting Un mendicante, studio dal vero. In 1883 at Rome, he exhibited another similar subject, and in 1884 at Turin: Al passeggio che fu bene accolto. He died in Turin that same year.
