= Maria Maddalena Baldacci =

Italian artist (1718–1782)

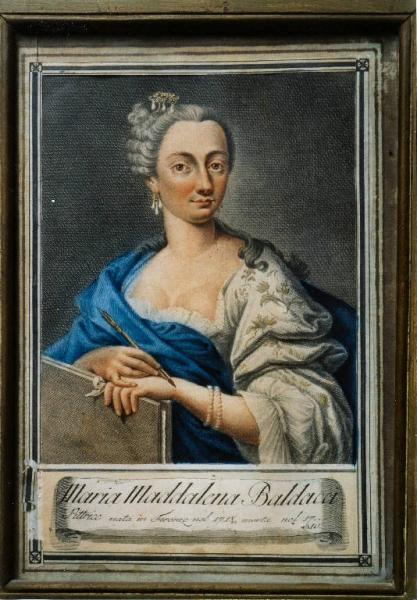
- Self-portrait by Maria Maddalena Baldacci, 1750
- Born: 1718; Florence, Italy
- Died: 1782 (aged 63–64); Florence, Italy
- Known for: Painting

Maria Maddalena Baldacci (1718–1782) was an Italian painter. She was born in Florence. She painted portrait miniatures and crayon, including the portrait of Empress Maria Theresa.
