= Bonneville, Savoy =

Painting by J. M. W. Turner

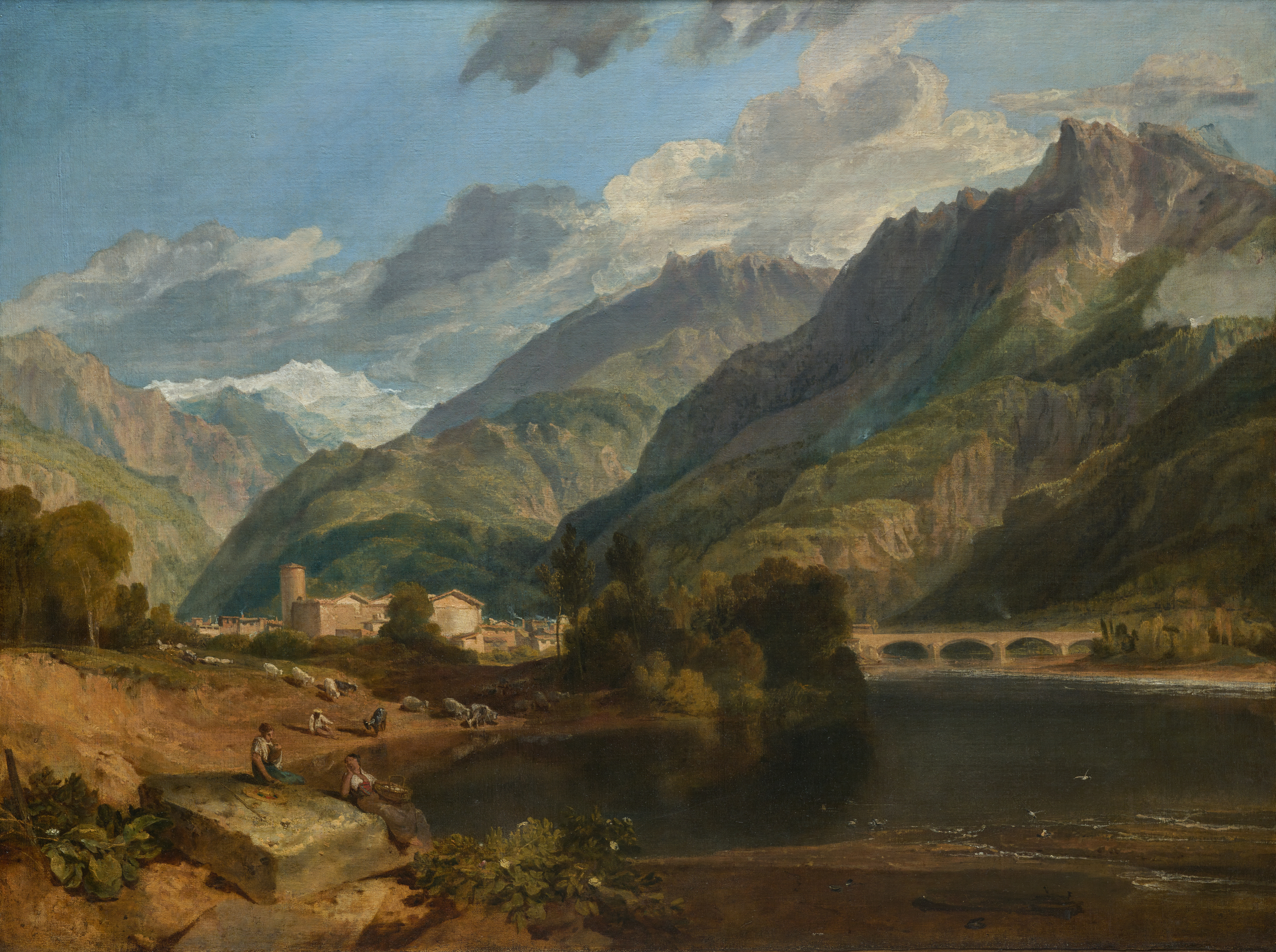
- Artist: J.M.W. Turner
- Year: 1803
- Type: Oil on canvas
- Dimensions: 92.1 cm × 123.2 cm (36.3 in × 48.5 in)
- Location: Dallas Museum of Art, Dallas

Bonneville, Savoy is an 1803 landscape painting by the British artist J.M.W. Turner. It features a view of the settlement of Bonneville in Savoy. During the Peace of Amiens Turner travelled to Continental Europe where he visited France and Switzerland. At the time Savoy was part of France, having been annexed during the French Revolutionary Wars.

The painting was submitted to the Royal Academy's Summer Exhibition of 1803 at Somerset House in London along with other pictures inspired by Turner's trip to the continent. Today it is in the collection of the Dallas Museum of Art in Texas.

A later version of the same subject painted circa 1812 is in the Philadelphia Museum of Art.

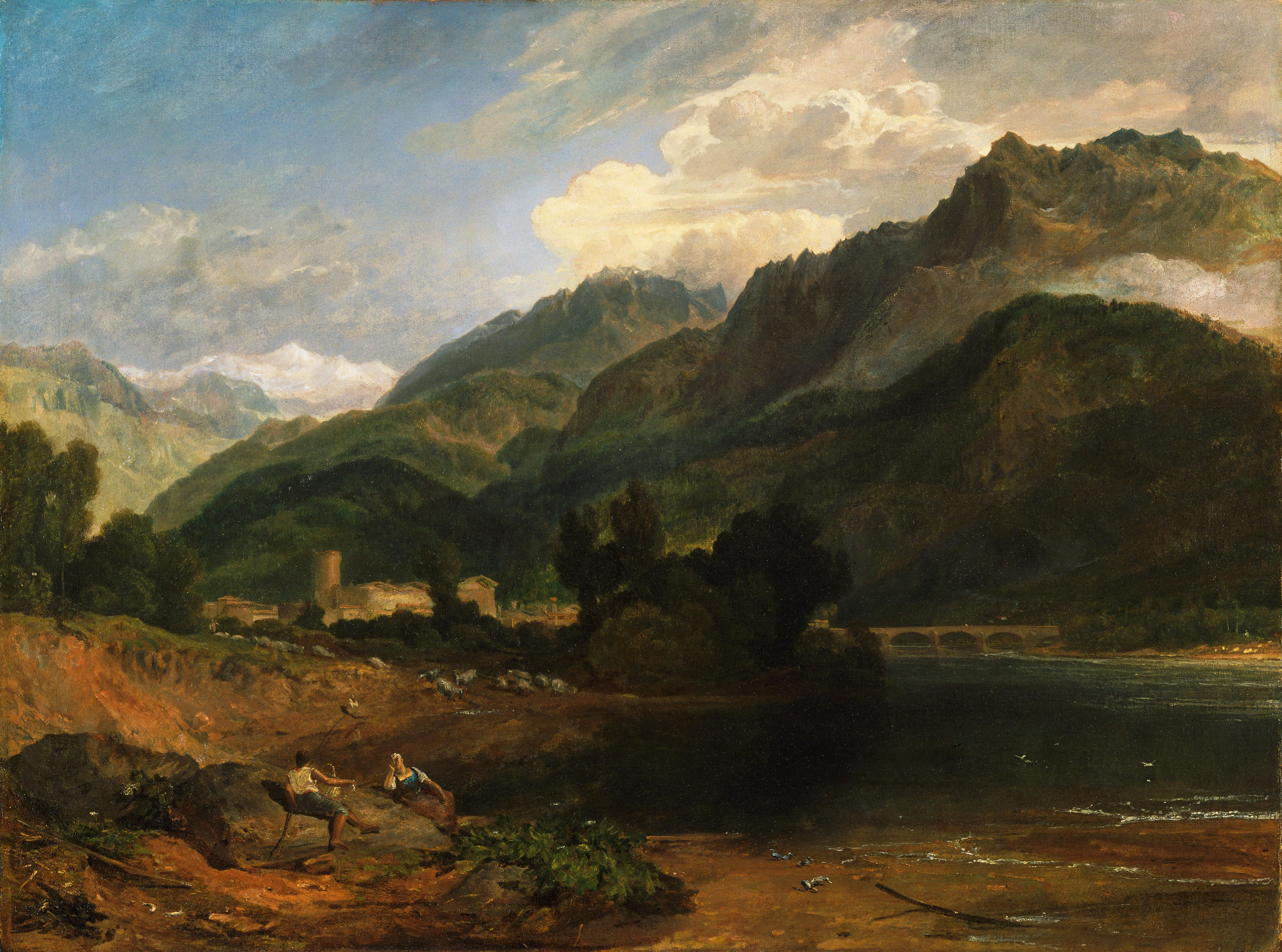
c. 1812 version

== See also ==
- List of paintings by J. M. W. Turner

== Bibliography ==
- Bailey, Anthony. J.M.W. Turner: Standing in the Sun. Tate Enterprises Ltd, 2013.
- Hamilton, James. Turner - A Life. Sceptre, 1998.
- Hill, David. Turner in the Alps: The Journey Through France & Switzerland in 1802. George Philip, 1991.
- Smiles, Sam. J. M. W. Turner: The Making of a Modern Artist. Manchester University Press, 2007.
