= Josias English =

Josias English was an amateur etcher. He was originally thought to have died in 1718, but upon the discovery of his will it transpired his death actually occurred in 1705.

English was a gentleman of independent means who resided at Mortlake which was then in Surrey and is now a district of London. He was an intimate friend and a pupil of Francis Cleyn, the manager of the Mortlake Tapestry Works, and etched numerous plates in the style of Wenceslaus Hollar, after Cleyn's designs; these include a set of eleven plates, etched in 1653, entitled "Variæ Deorum Ethnicorum Effigies, or Divers Portraicturs of Heathen Gods", a set of four representing "The Seasons", a similar set of "The Four Cardinal Virtues", and a set of fourteen plates of grotesques and arabesques.

His most important etching was "Christ and the Disciples at Emmaus", after Titian. He also etched a plate of a jovial man smoking, dated 1656, portraits of Richard Kirkby, John Ogilby, and William Dobson; the last-named etching was long attributed to John Evelyn.

There is in the British Museum a small mezzotint engraving by English. According to Vertue, he claimed English died about 1718 (later discovered to have been 1705), and left his property, which included a portrait of Cleyn and his wife and some samples of the Mortlake tapestry, to Mr Crawley of Hempsted, Hertfordshire. His wife, Mary, died on 21 March 1679–80, and was buried in Barnes.
