= Albert Androt =

French composer

Albert Auguste Androt (1781 – 19 August 1804) was a French composer.

== Life ==
He was born at Paris in 1781, and admitted into the Conservatoire de Paris in his fifteenth year. In 1799 he obtained a prize for his exercises in harmony, and four years afterwards, having gained the newly established Prix de Rome for his Alcyone, he was sent to that city to study under Pietro Alessandro Guglielmi. During the first year of his residence in Rome, he made such progress that his master commissioned him to write a requiem and another sacred composition. The latter, performed during Passion Week, excited so much admiration, that he was engaged to compose an opera for the autumn. He had scarcely completed the last scene when he died on 19 August 1804. The following October a De Profundis of his composition was performed in his memory at the church of San Lorenzo in Lucina.
