= The Festival of the Opening of the Vintage at Mâcon =

Painting by J. M. W. Turner

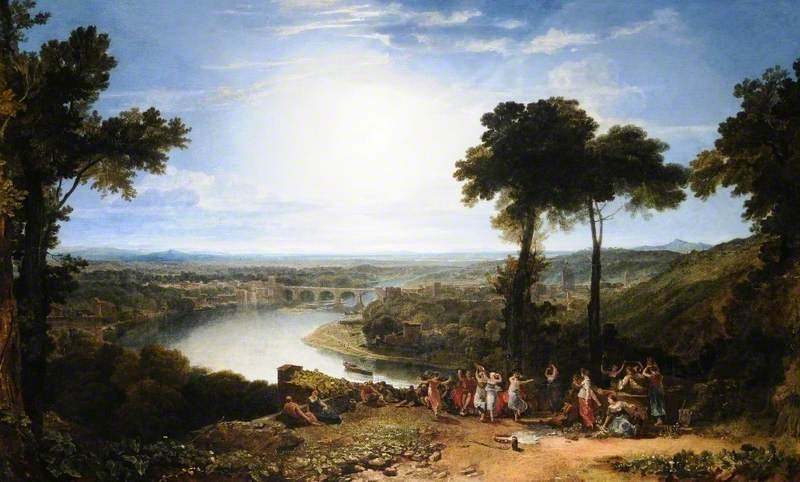
- Artist: J.M.W. Turner
- Year: 1803
- Type: Oil on canvas, landscape painting
- Dimensions: 182.5 cm × 274.4 cm (71.9 in × 108.0 in)
- Location: Graves Art Gallery, Sheffield

The Festival of the Opening of the Vintage at Mâcon is an 1803 landscape painting by the English artist J.M.W. Turner. It was produced in the wake of Turner's visit to Continental Europe during the Peace of Amiens. The pause in fighting was brief and the Napoleonic Wars broke our soon afterwards.

The painting was inspired by Turner's journey through Mâcon in Burgundy during the harvesting season in the vineyards. Despite the title, the painting draws much of its inspiration from the River Thames at Richmond, then west of London. Stylistically it is a homage to the works of the seventeenth century Old Master Claude Lorrain, who Turner greatly admired.

It was one of six paintings that Turner displayed at the Royal Academy Exhibition of 1803 at Somerset House, his first year as a full member of the Academy. Turner priced the painting at £300 when he turned down an offer to purchase it for 250 guineas from the art collector Sir John Leicester. It was ultimately acquired by Charles Anderson-Pelham, 1st Earl of Yarborough for £400. The painting is now in the collection of the Graves Art Gallery in Sheffield.

== See also ==
- List of paintings by J. M. W. Turner

== Bibliography ==
- Bailey, Anthony. J.M.W. Turner: Standing in the Sun. Tate Enterprises Ltd, 2013.
- Hamilton, James. Turner - A Life. Sceptre, 1998.
- Hill, David. Turner in the Alps: The Journey Through France & Switzerland in 1802. George Philip, 1991.
