= Under the Cherry Tree =

Painting by John Lavery

- Artist: John Lavery
- Year: 1884
- Type: Oil on canvas, genre painting
- Dimensions: 150.8 cm × 150.4 cm (59.4 in × 59.2 in)
- Location: Ulster Museum, Belfast

Under the Cherry Tree is an 1884 oil painting by the Irish artist John Lavery. While studying in Paris Lavery paid visit to the artist's colony at Grez-sur-Loing. This was one of his most ambitious early paintings. It has also been known by the alternative title On the Loing, an Afternoon Chat. It depicts a scene on the River Loing where a laundress accompanied by a child stops her work for a conversation with a passing boatman.

One of the Glasgow Boys, Lavery was an important figure in the development of British Impressionism. Although produced en plein air, this painting also reflects the Realism that he had seen at the Paris Salon.

The painting has been part of the collection of the Ulster Museum in Belfast since 1929.

== Bibliography ==
- McConkey, Kenneth. A Free Spirit: Irish Art, 1860-1960. Antique Collectors' Club, 1990.
- O'Brien, Gerard & Roebuck, Peter. Nine Ulster Lives. Ulster Historical Foundation, 1992.
