= Portrait of Lord Thurlow =

1803 painting by Thomas Lawrence

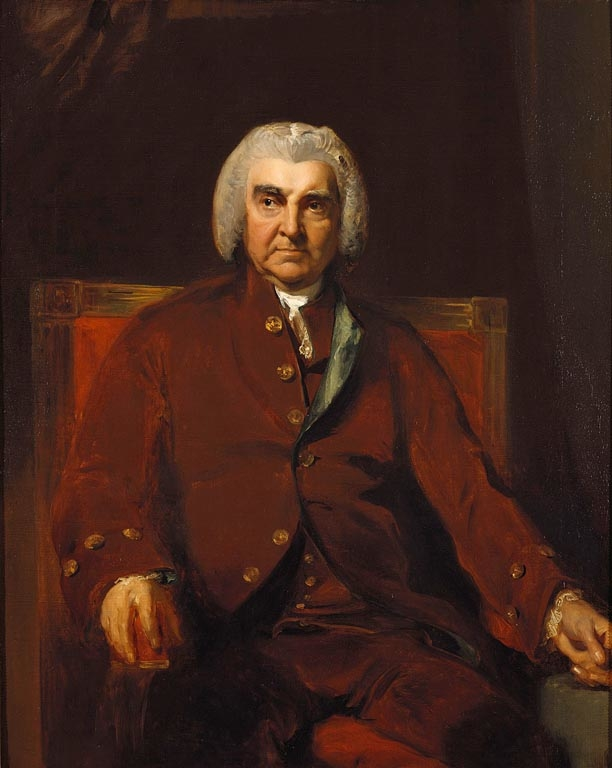
- Artist: Thomas Lawrence
- Year: 1803
- Type: Oil on canvas
- Dimensions: 128.5 cm × 102.6 cm (50.6 in × 40.4 in)
- Location: Royal Collection, London

Portrait of Lord Thurlow is an oil on canvas portrait painting by the British artist Thomas Lawrence, from 1803. It depicts Edward Thurlow, 1st Baron Thurlow the former Lord Chancellor who held the post from 1778 to 1792. When he sat for Lawrence he was at the end of a long career.

== History and description ==
Lawrence had emerged as a child prodigy in Bath in the 1780s. By the early years of the nineteenth century he had established himself in London as portraitist of Society figures. The painting was produced in late 1802. It has been suggested as counter-argument to the idea that Lawrence was excessively flattering to his sitters in the romantic style. He portrays the veteran Thurlow as an aged, plain-dressed and deeply conservative figure.

The painting was originally commissioned by Caroline of Brunswick but was commandeered by her estranged husband the Prince of Wales the future George IV, who was later to become a frequent patron of Lawrence.

The work was exhibited at the Royal Academy's Summer Exhibition of 1803 at Somerset House. It brought near universal acclaim from the press. After visiting the exhibition George III praised It as "a true representation of the man without artificial fancies of dress". Today the painting remains in the Royal Collection.

== Bibliography ==
- Gore-Brown. Chancellor Thurlow: The Life and Times of an XVIIIth Century Lawyer. Hamilton, 1953.
- Levey, Michael. Sir Thomas Lawrence. Yale University Press, 2005.
