= Portrait of Letizia Bonaparte =

Painting by François Gérard

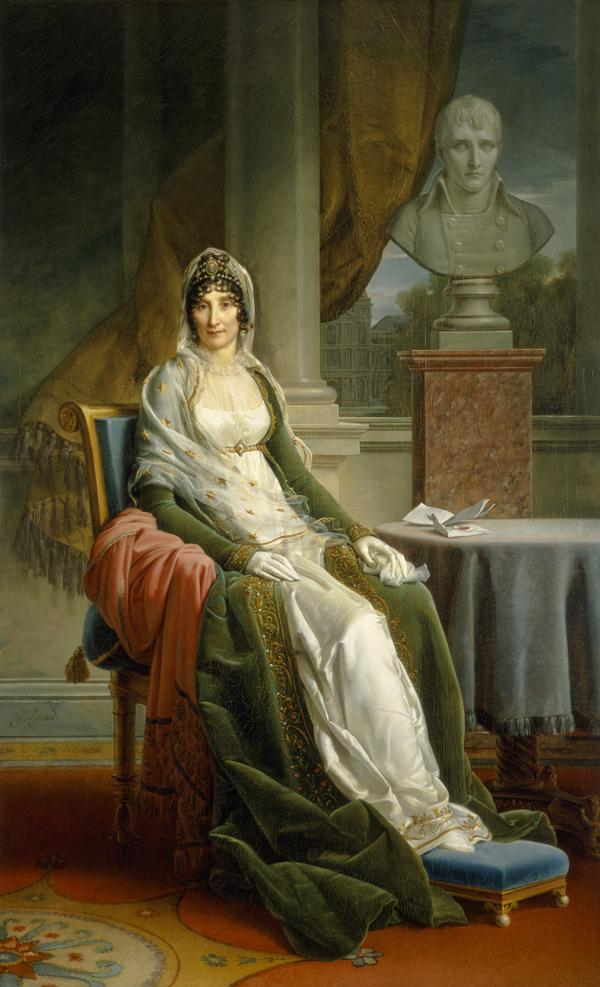
- Artist: François Gérard
- Year: 1802–1803
- Type: Oil on canvas, portrait painting
- Dimensions: 210.8 cm × 129.8 cm (83.0 in × 51.1 in)
- Location: Scottish National Gallery, Edinburgh

Portrait of Letizia Bonaparte or Madame Mère is a c.1803 portrait painting by the French artist François Gérard. It depicts the Corsican noblewoman Letizia Bonaparte, best known as the mother of Napoleon, Emperor of the French. Several of her other children, acquired royal status during the Napoleonic era as rulers of Imperial France's client states, forming the House of Bonaparte. Gérard, a former student of Jacques-Louis David, painted many members of the extended Bonaparte family. After the Bourbon Restoration of 1814 he switched to painting Louis XVIII and members of the House of Bourbon.

She is portrayed at full-length seated in a well-furnished apartment overlooking the Tuileries Palace in Paris, with a bust of Napoleon beside her. The painting was taken to Italy by the sitter's granddaughter Mathilde Bonaparte when she married, Today it is in the collection of the Scottish National Gallery in Edinburgh, having been acquired in 1988 with the support of the Art Fund.

== See also ==
- Napoleon I as Emperor, an 1805 painting by Gérard

== Bibliography ==
- Freund, Amy Elisabeth. Revolutionary Likenesses: Portraiture and Politics in France, 1789-1804. University of California, Berkeley, 2005.
- Gott, Ted & Huguenaud, Karine. Napoleon: Revolution to Empire. ISBN 0724103554. National Gallery of Victoria, 2012.
