= Royal Academy Exhibition of 1803 =

1803 art exhibition in London

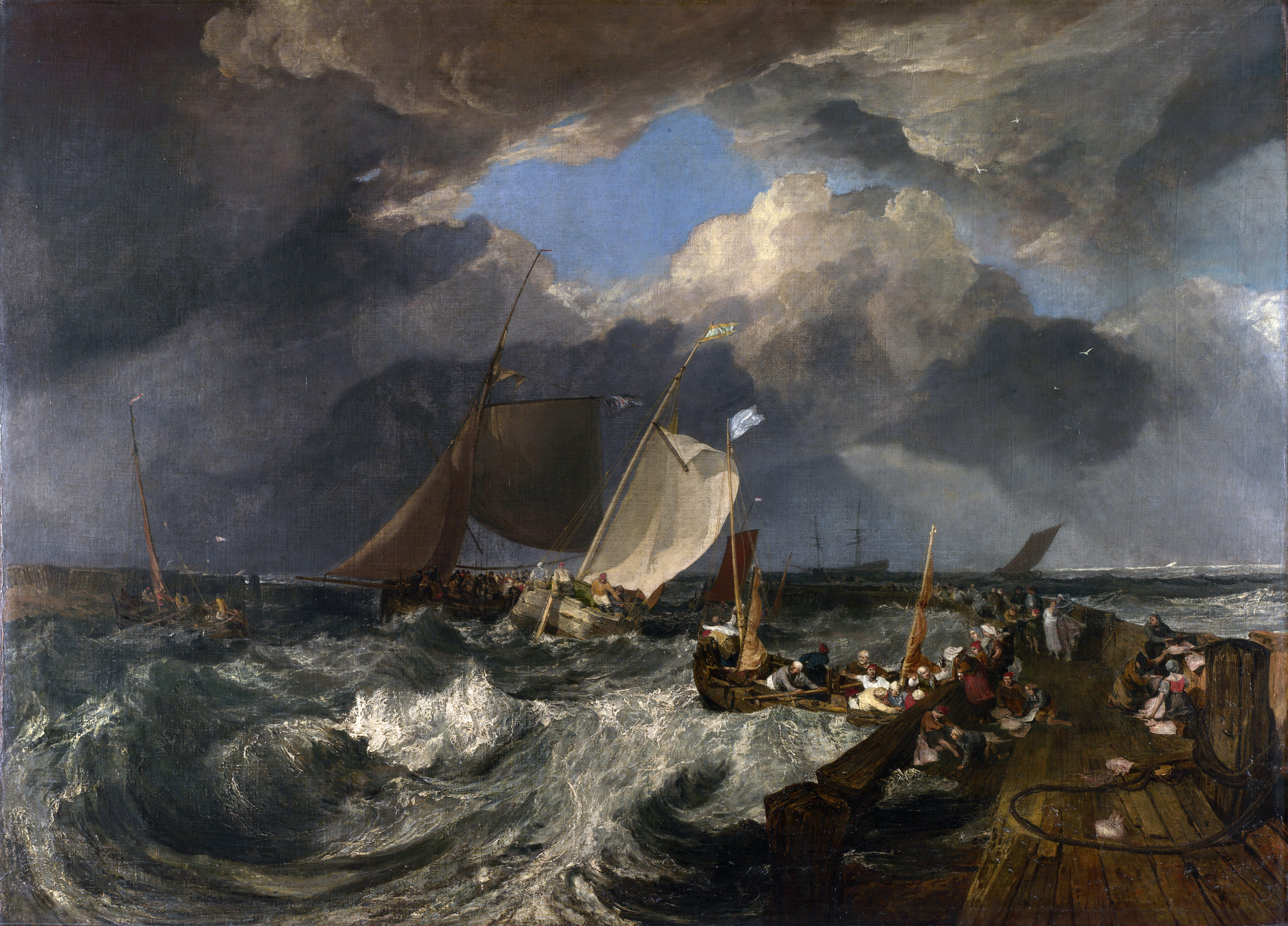
Calais Pier by J.M.W. Turner

The Royal Academy Exhibition of 1803 was an art exhibition held at Somerset House in London between 2 May and 11 June 1803. It was the thirty fifth annual Summer Exhibition staged by the Royal Academy of Arts. It was notable for the submissions by the London-born painter J.M.W. Turner who had recently been elected as a full member of the Academy at the age of twenty seven.

The Treaty of Amiens, signed the previous March, brought an end to the French Revolutionary Wars. During the peace a number of British artists had travelled to Continental Europe including France. The President of the Royal Academy Benjamin West had visited Paris and exhibited a work at the Salon of 1802 at the Louvre. By the time the 1803 exhibition in London was being held, the uneasy peace between Britain and France ended and the decade-long Napoleonic Wars began. A number of artists submitted works reflecting their trips to the continent, including Turner whose seascape Calais Pier reflected his first landing in France during a storm.

Thomas Lawrence exhibited portraits of leading political and high society figures including William Windham and Emily Lamb, the sister and wife of future Prime Ministers. Lawrence's Portrait of Lord Thurlow, featuring the former Lord Chancellor Lord Thurlow, attracted particular praise from critics and George III.

The Academy was the scene of growing tension between the two American painters Benjamin West and John Singleton Copley. Both artists gained bad publicity from the exhibition. Copley's large group portrait The Knatchbull Family received a poor critical reception and he withdrew it at the demand of Sir Edward Knatchbull who had commissioned it while West was accused of violating the Academy rules by submitting the history painting Hagar and Ishmael which he had previously exhibited, and ended up withdrawing it from show.

== Gallery ==
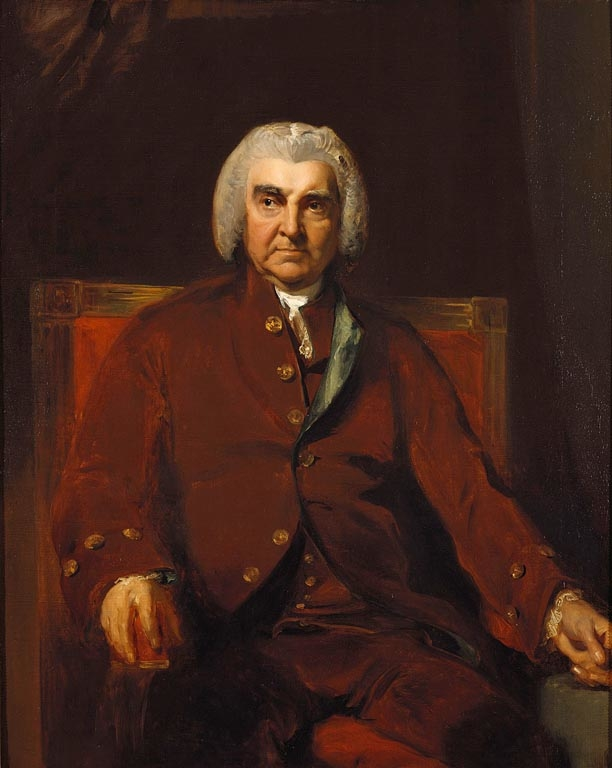
Portrait of Lord Thurlow by Thomas Lawrence

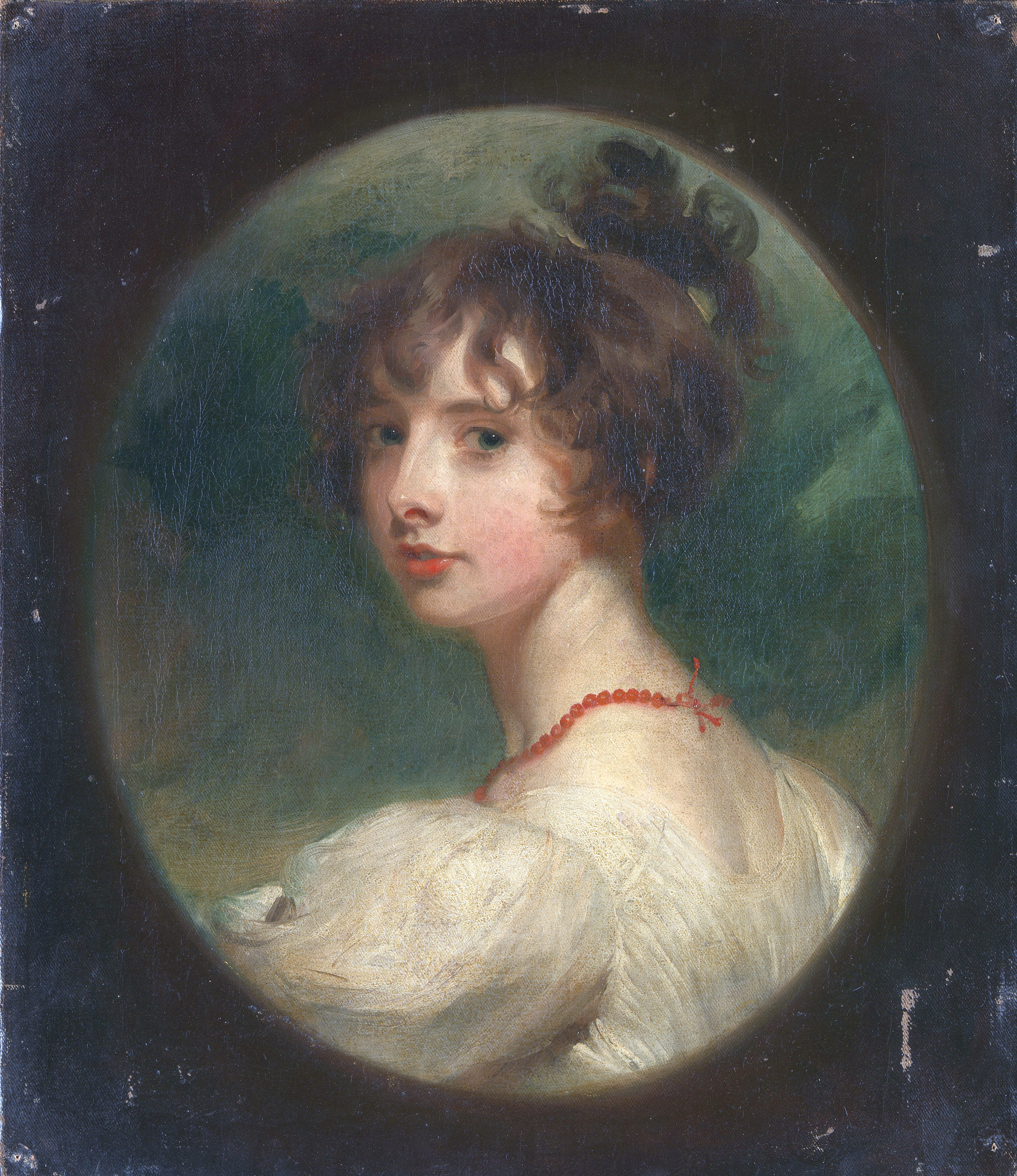
Portrait of Emily Lamb by Thomas Lawrence

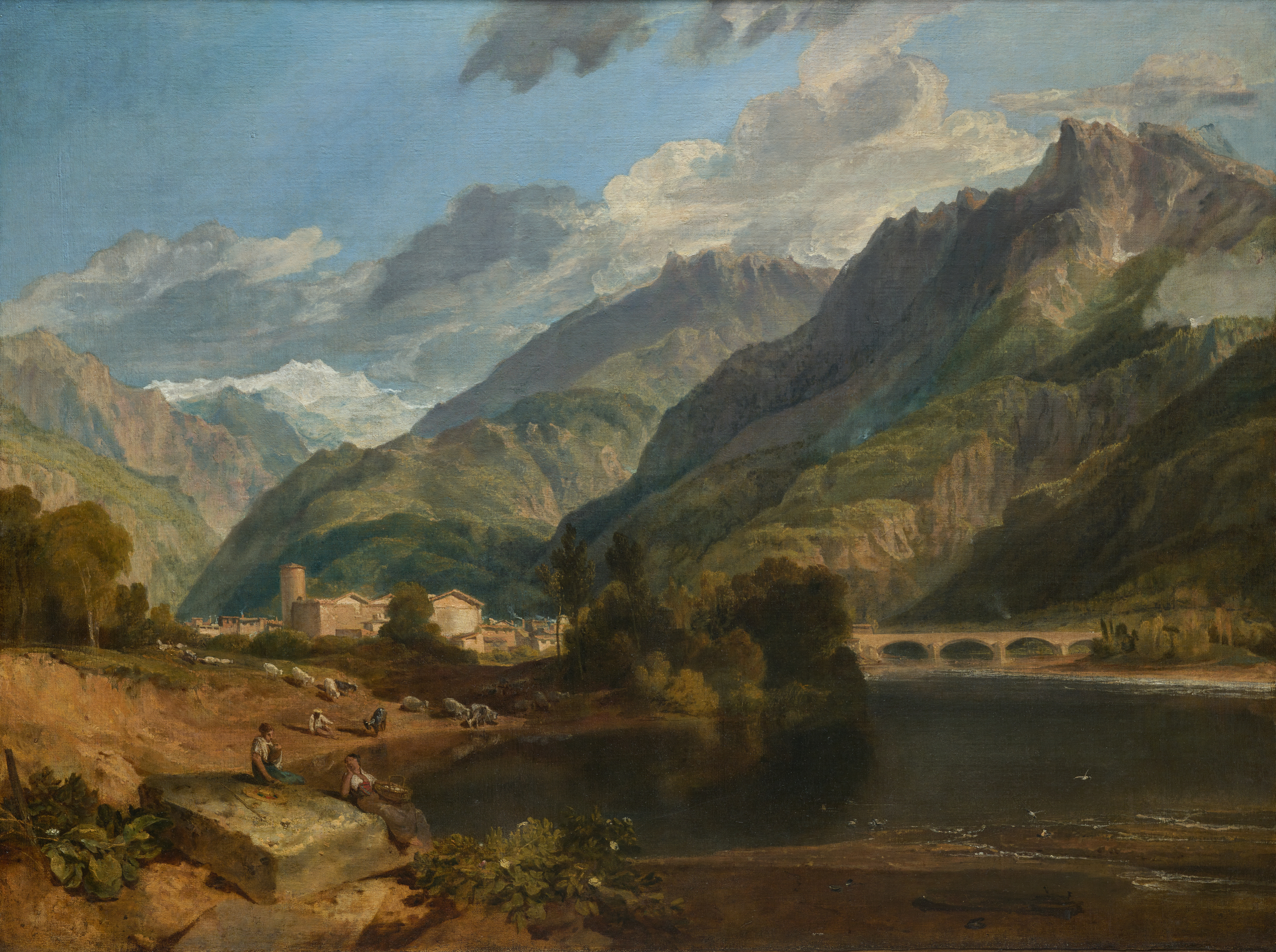
Bonneville, Savoy by J.M.W. Turner

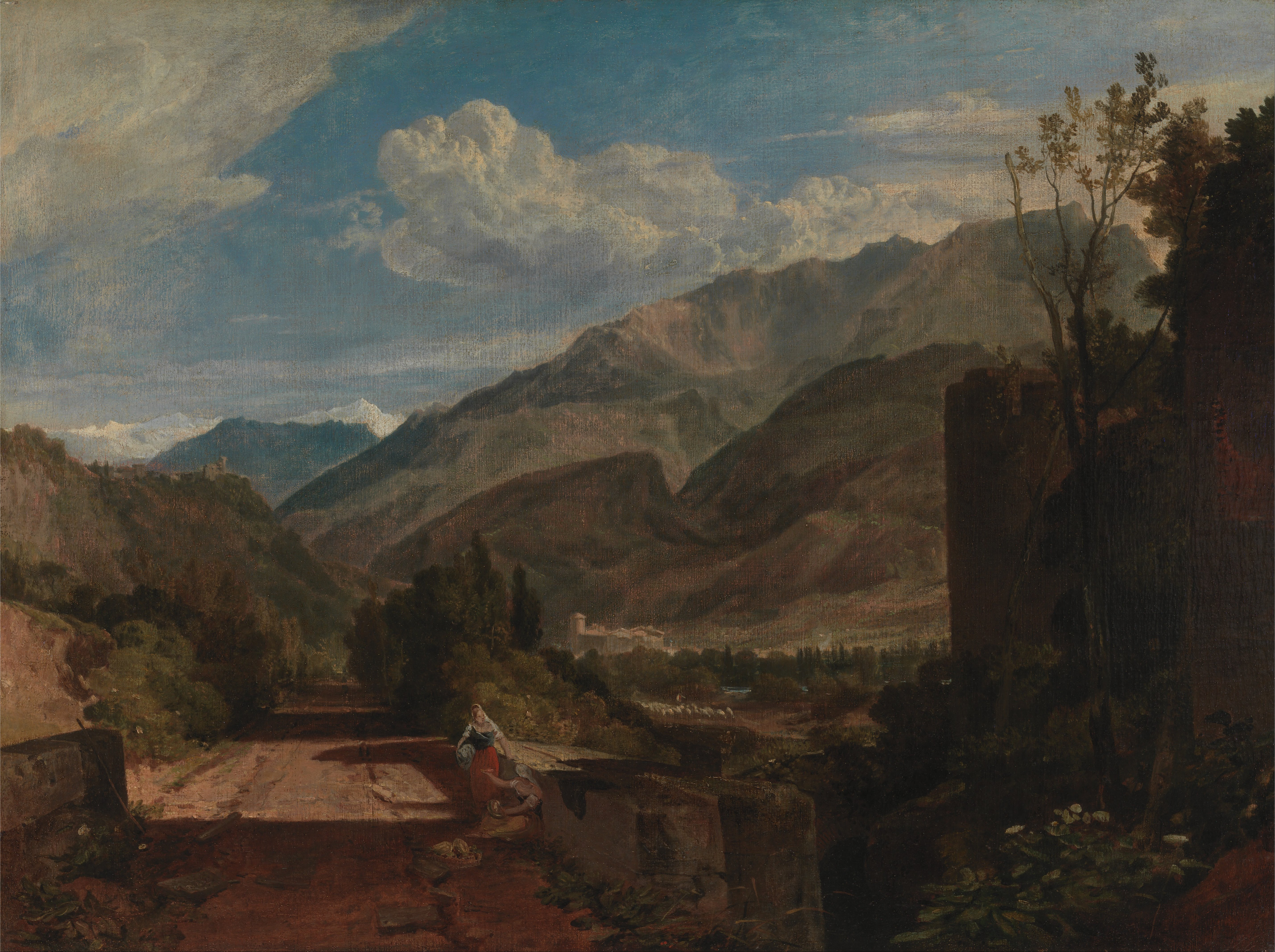
Chateau de St. Michael, Bonneville, Savoy by J.M.W. Turner, 1803

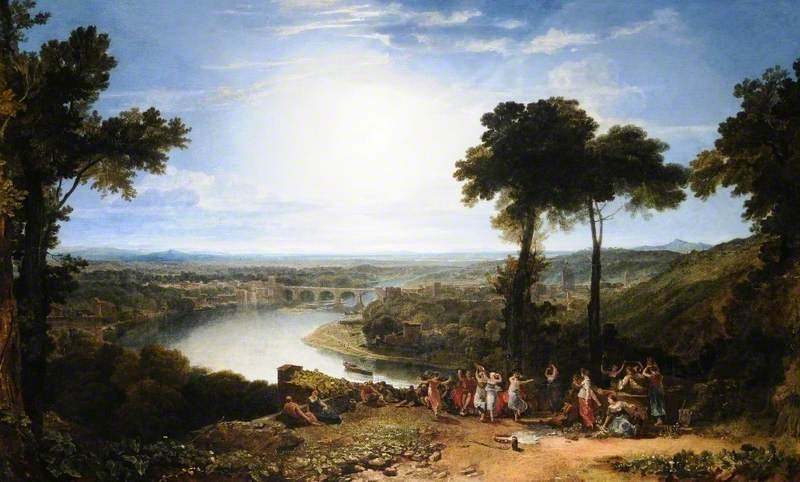
The Festival of the Opening of the Vintage at Mâcon by J.M.W. Turner

St Huges Denouncing Vengeance on the Shepherd of Cormayer in the Valley of d'Aoust by J.M.W. Turner

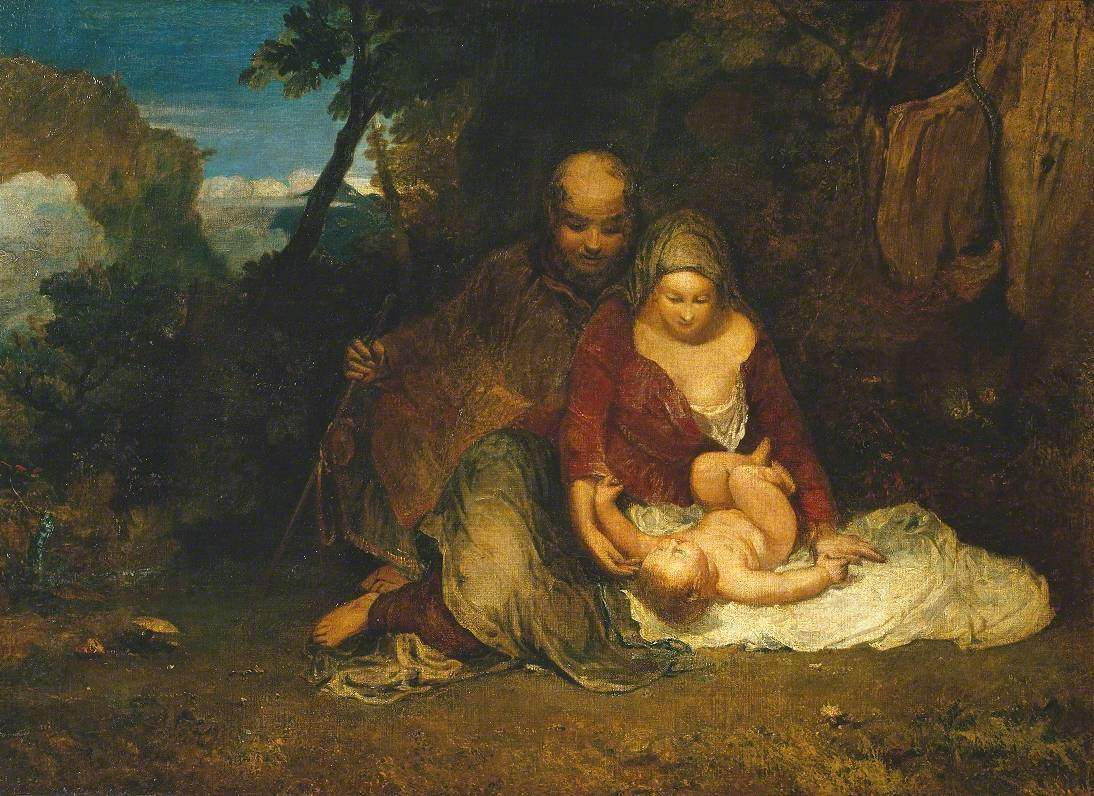
The Holy Family by J.M.W. Turner

Prospero and Miranda by Henry Thomson

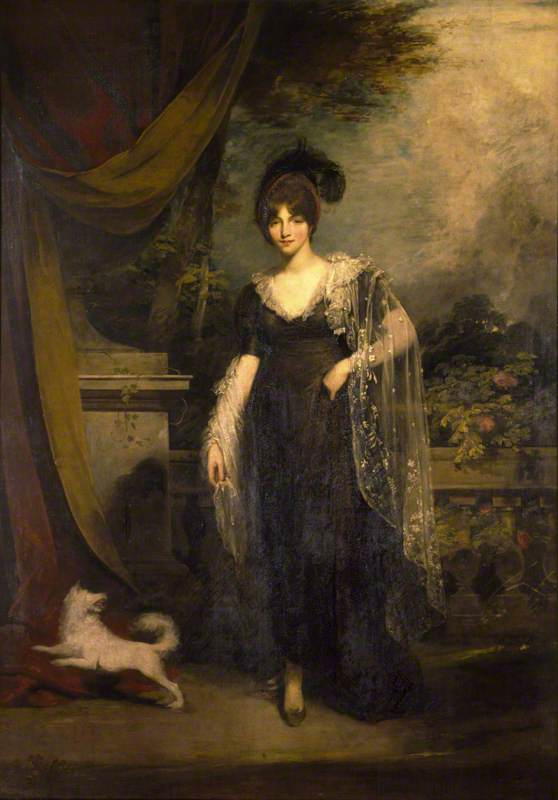
Portrait of Mary Robinson by William Owen

Portrait of Captain Samuel Brooking by James Northcote

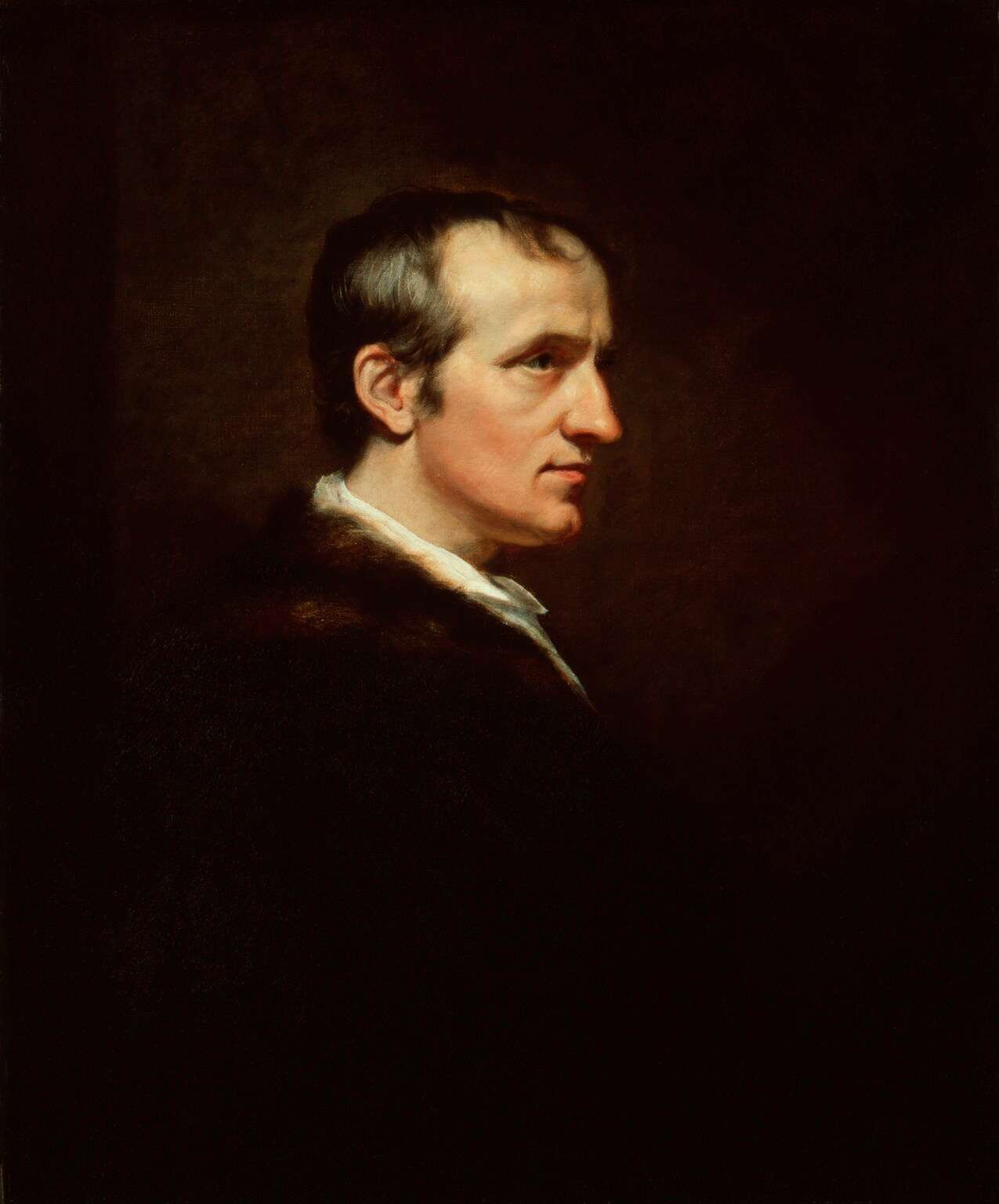
Portrait of William Godwin by James Northcote

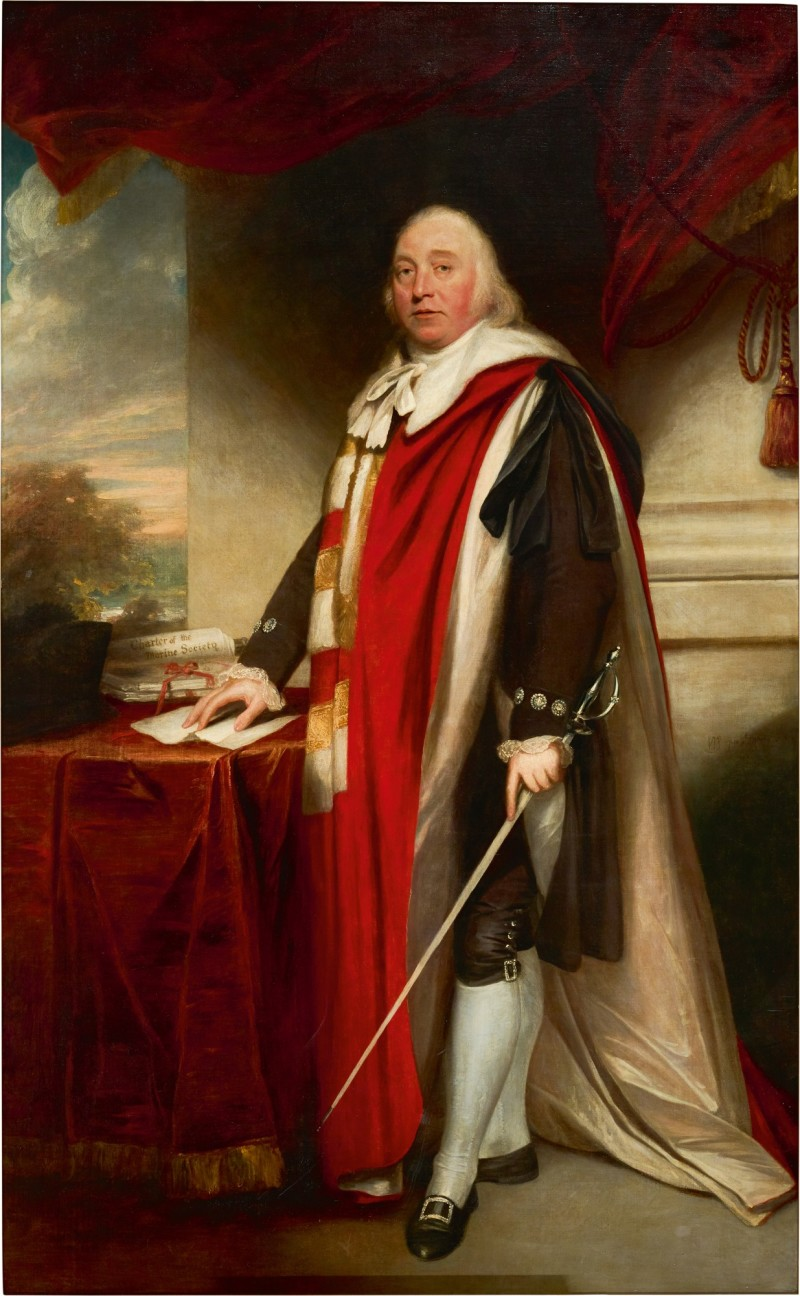
Portrait of the Earl of Romney by William Beechey

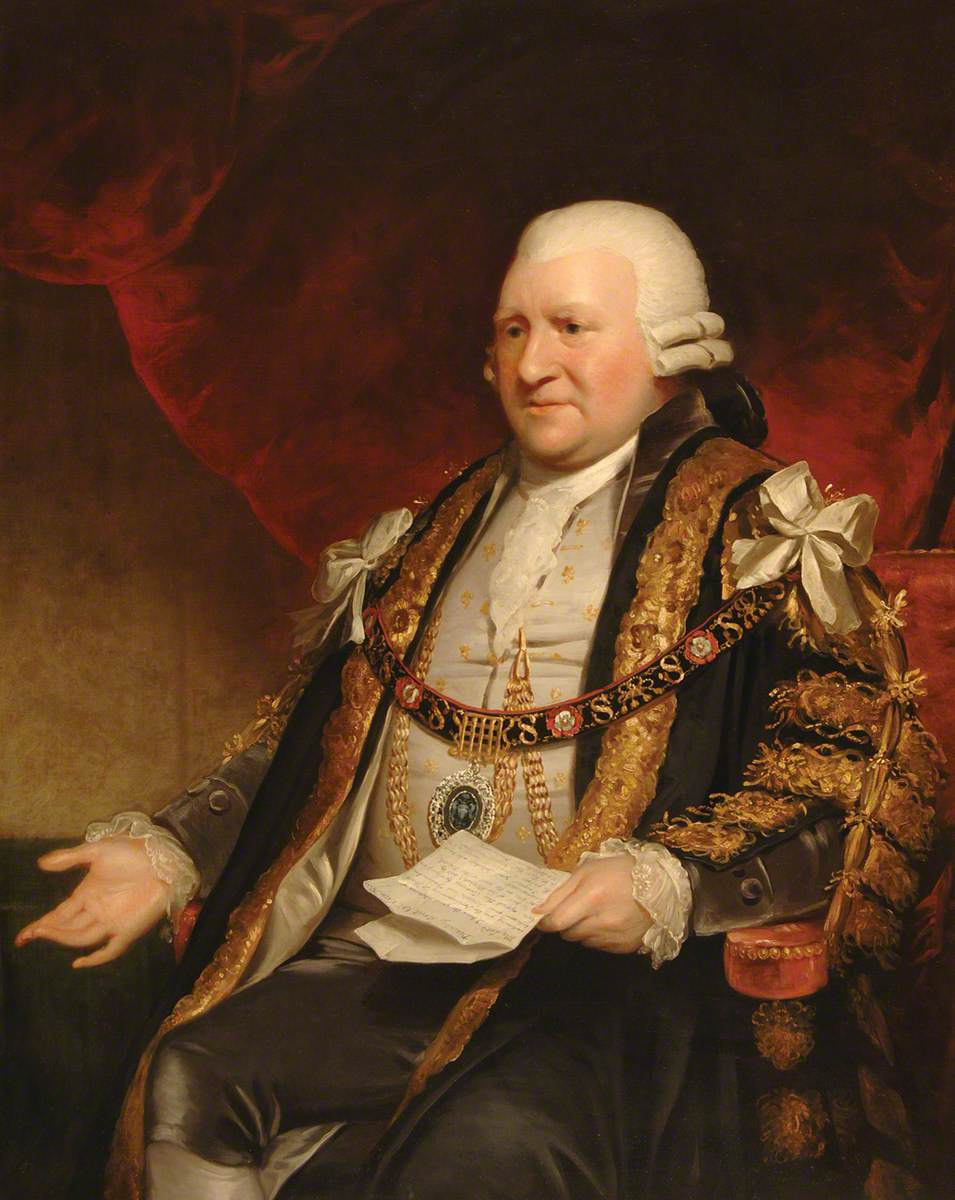
Portrait of William Staines by William Beechey

Mrs. Symonds and Her Children by William Beechey

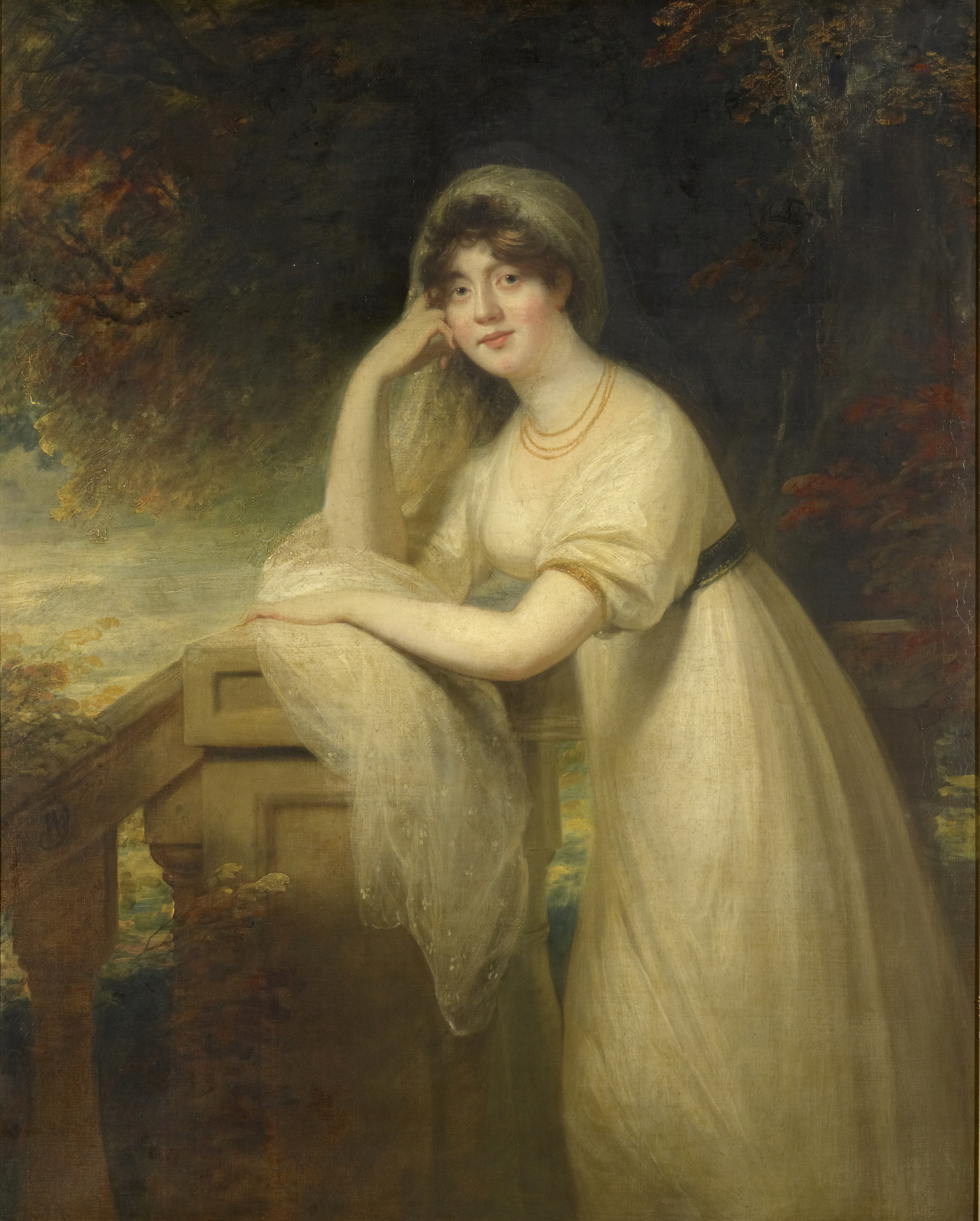
Princess Sophia of Gloucester by William Beechey

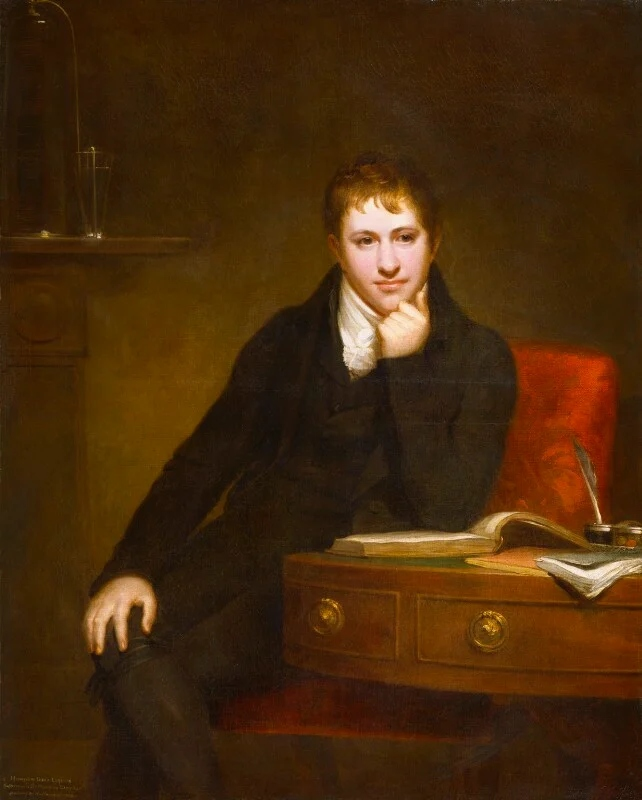
Portrait of Humphry Davy by Henry Howard

Portrait of John Henry Johnstone by Martin Archer Shee

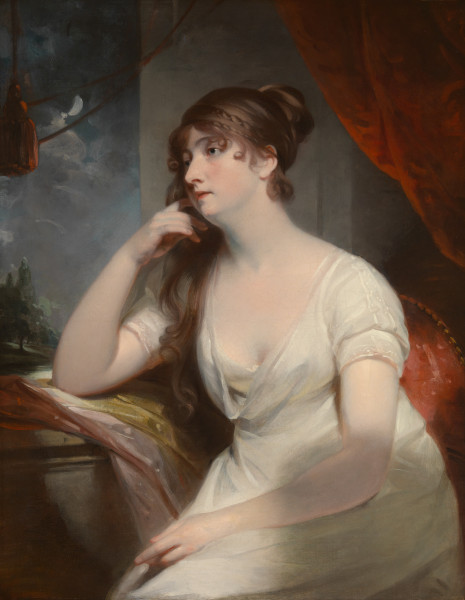
Portrait of Maria Ann Pope by Martin Archer Shee

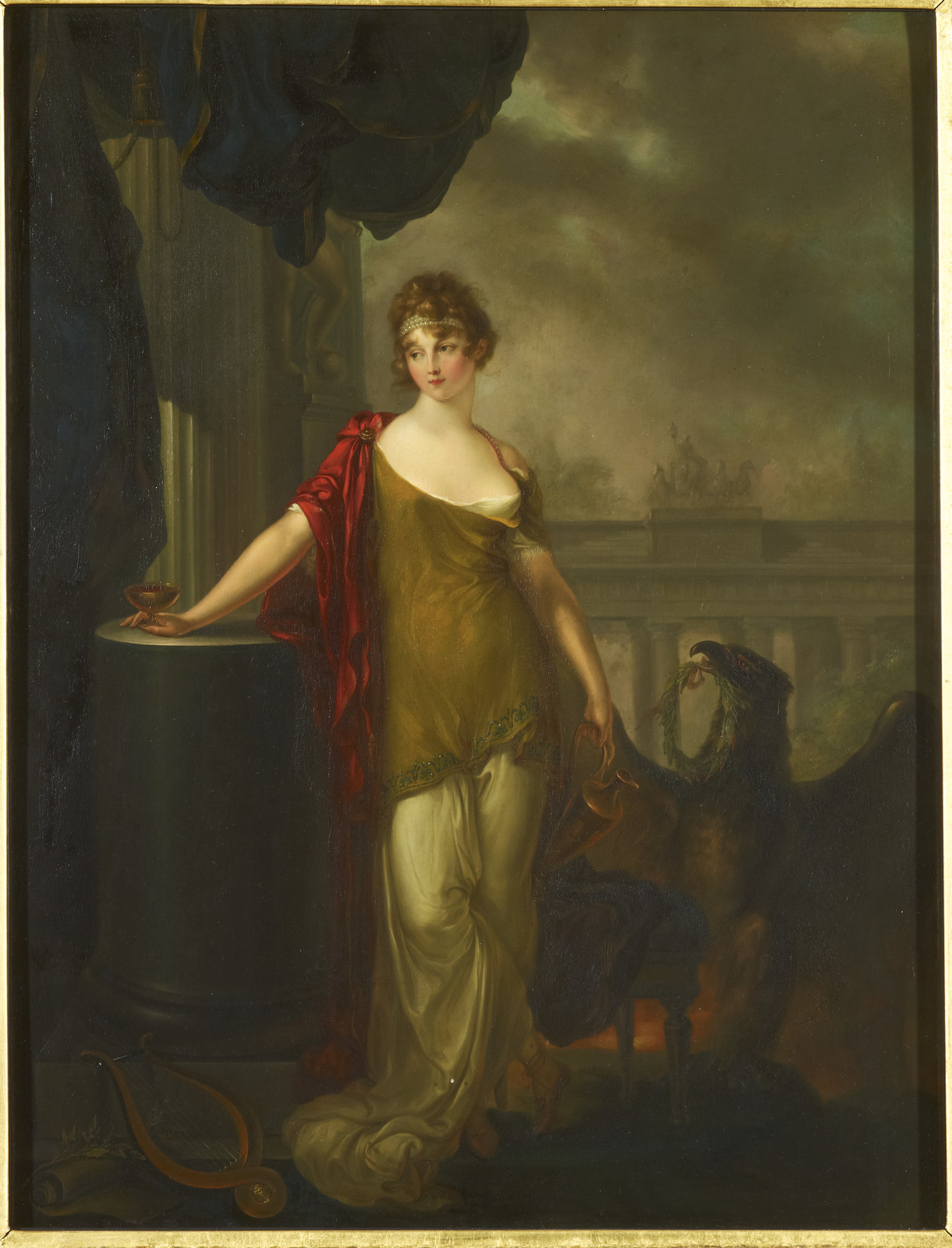
Portrait of Louise, Queen of Prussia by Peter Edward Stroehling

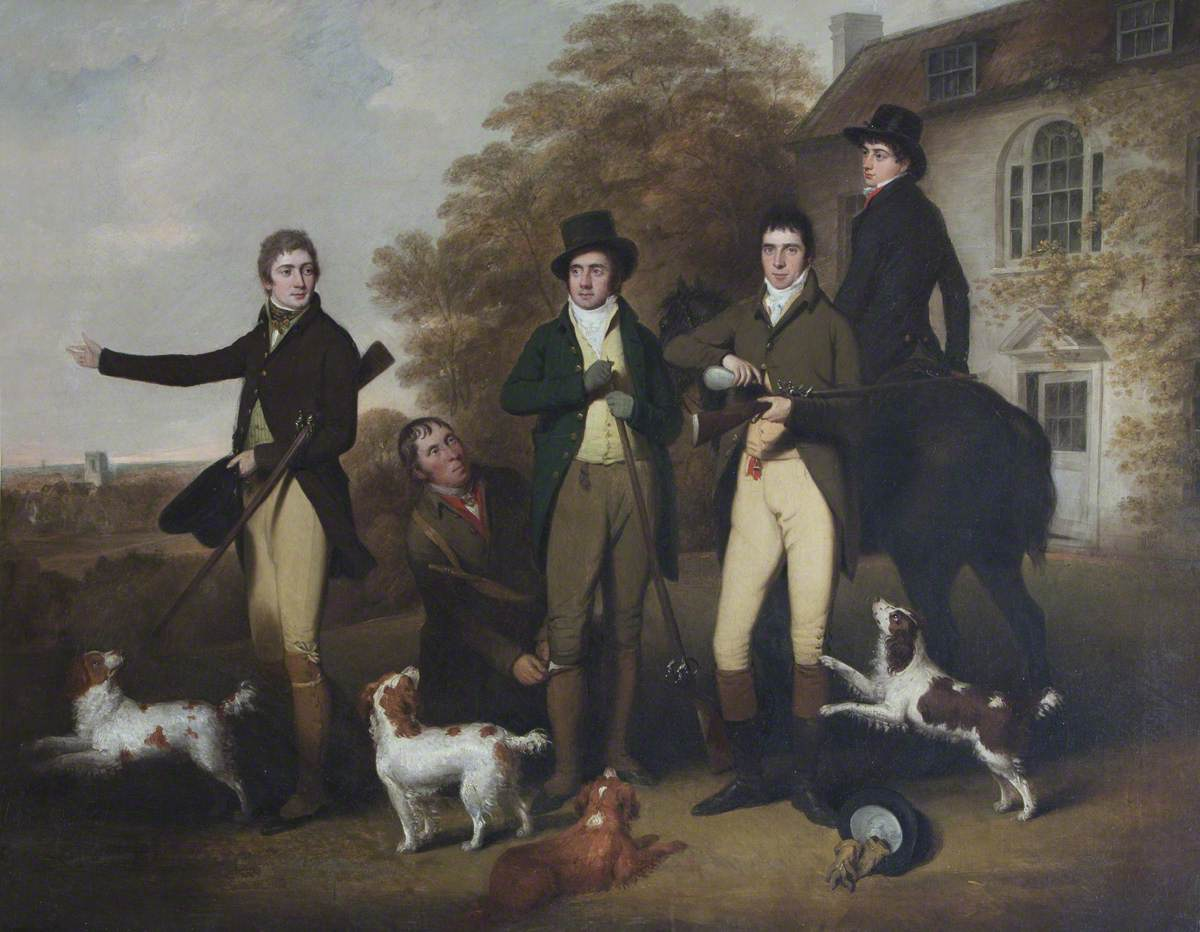
A Shooting Party by William Redmore Bigg

Portrait of a Newfoundland Dog by George Stubbs

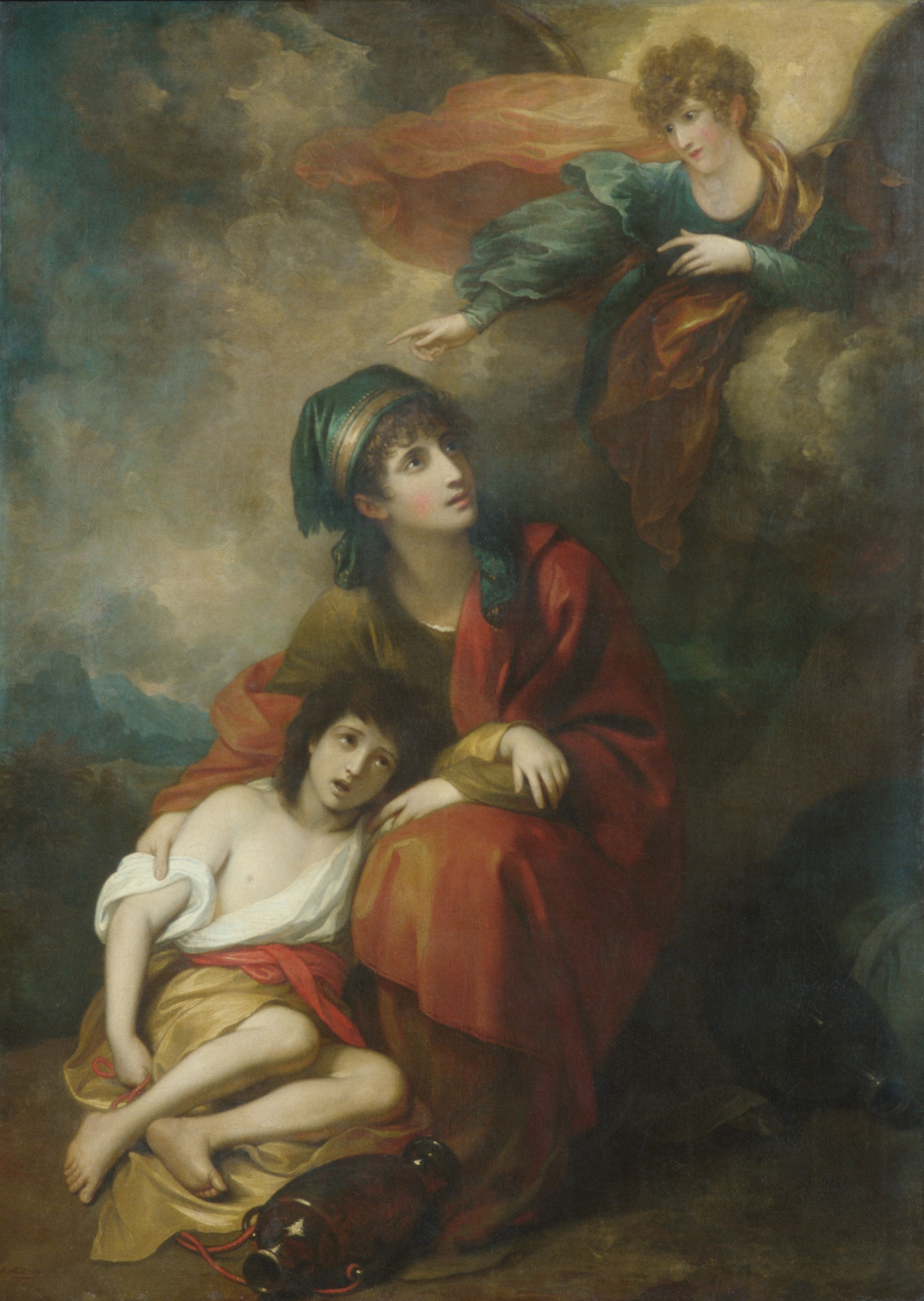
Hagar and Ishmael by Benjamin West

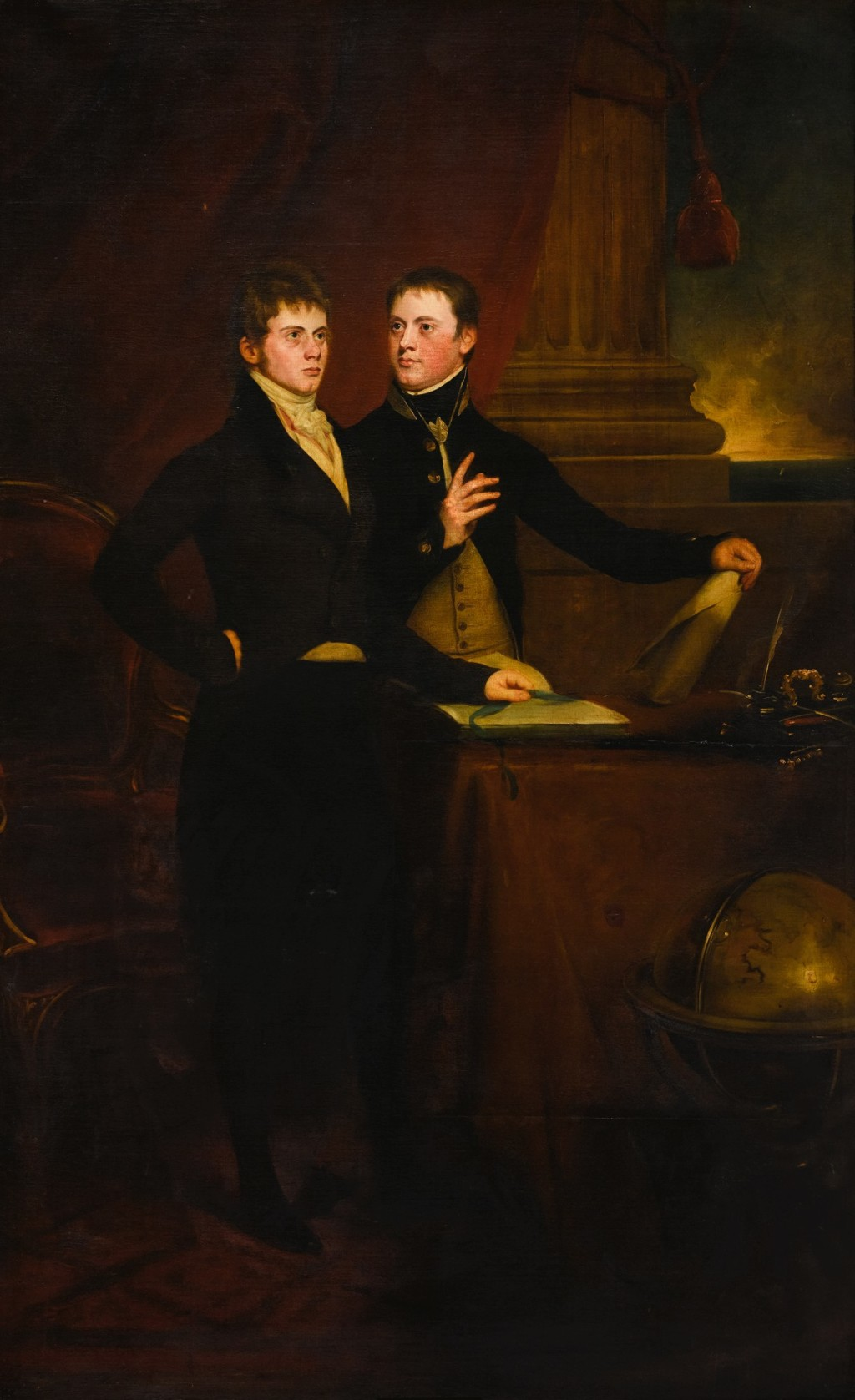
A surviving fragment of The Knatchbull Family by John Singleton Copley

== Bibliography ==
- Albinson, Cassandra, Funnell, Peter & Peltz, Lucy. Thomas Lawrence: Regency Power and Brilliance. Yale University Press, 2010.
- Bailey, Anthony. J.M.W. Turner: Standing in the Sun. Tate Enterprises Ltd, 2013.
- Levey, Michael. Sir Thomas Lawrence. Yale University Press, 2005.
- Spencer-Longhurst, Paul. The Sun Rising Through Vapour: Turner's Early Seascapes. Third Millennium Information, 2003.
