= Giuseppe Camerata =

Italian painter

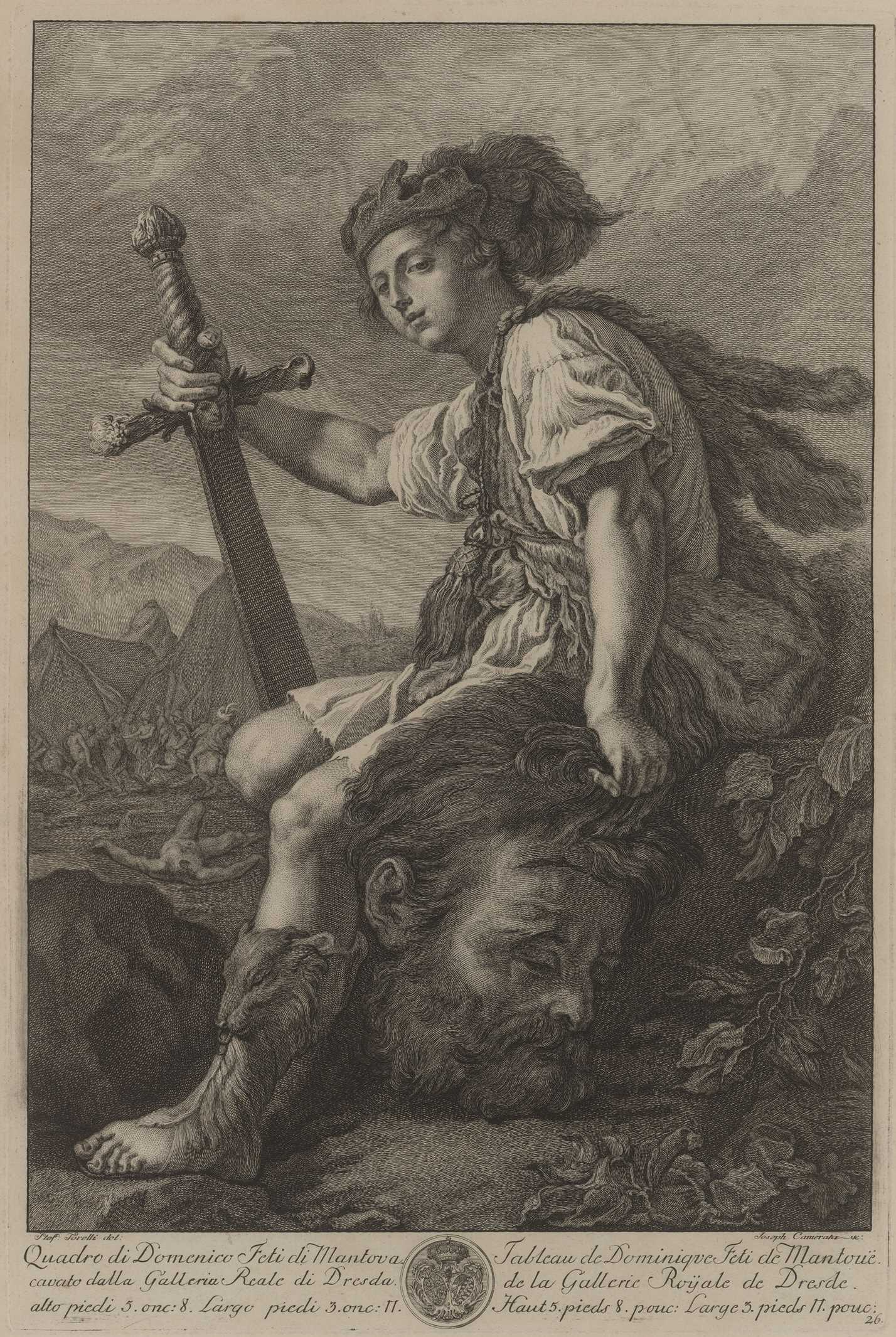
David with the Head of Goliath, after a painting by Domenico Fetti

Giuseppe Camerata (1718–1803) was an Italian miniaturist painter and engraver.

== Biography ==
He was born at Frascati or at Venice, the son of G. Camerata, a painter of some reputation, and studied under Gregorio Lazzarini. He learned the technique of engraving from Giovanni Cattini, and after visiting Vienna in 1742, was in 1751 invited to assist in engraving the plates for the Dresden Gallery, and was there made principal engraver to the Court. He visited Italy again in later life, and subsequently came to Munich, where he settled for a time in 1763. He afterwards became professor in the Academy at Dresden, where he died.

== Selected works ==
=== Portraits ===
- Marco Foscarini, Doge of Venice and former patron of Piranesi.
- Simone Cantarini, Procurator of St. Mark.
- Sebastiano Bombelli, the Venetian painter.

=== Subjects from Dresden Gallery ===
- Parable of the Talents; Parable of the Lost Piece of Silver; Parable of the Prodigal Son; David with the Head of Goliath; Infant Bacchus; after Domenico Fetti.
- Holy Family; after Giulio Cesare Procaccini
- St. Roch aiding the Plague-stricken; after Camillo Procaccini.
- St. Roch distributing Alms and Assumption of the Virgin after Annibale Carracci.
- Adulteress before Christ; after Bartolomeo Biscaino.
- Chastity of Joseph; after Simone Cantarini.
- Old and New Testament; after A. Baccari.
- Mary Magdalene after Pompeo Batoni.
- A half-length figure, with a beard and Another half-length, the companion; after Dietrich.
- Mary Magdalene; after Van der Werf.
