= Treffle Berthlaume =

Canadian sculptor

- Born: June 13, 1803; Havre-St. Pierre, Quebec, Canada
- Died: October 22, 1884 (aged 81)

Treffle Berthlaume (June 13, 1803 – October 22, 1884) was a sculptor. He was born in Havre-St. Pierre, Quebec, Canada, to father Jean-Paul, a carpenter of modest means, and mother Brigitte (née de Panne). The youngest of six, and the only boy, Treffle was the only Berthlaume child to receive a formal education at Baie-Comeau High School until the age of 15, whereupon he began training in his father's craft.

Perhaps best remembered for his contribution towards church carvings, Berthlaume and acquaintance François Baillairgé (1759–1852) produced the Barbeau Cross, now displayed at the Church of Saint Jean on the Island of Orleans in Quebec. For this, and other achievements, Treffle Berthlaume was commemorated on the Canadian 32-cent stamp in 1984, after his death one hundred years earlier.
