= Calais Pier =

Painting by J. M. W. Turner

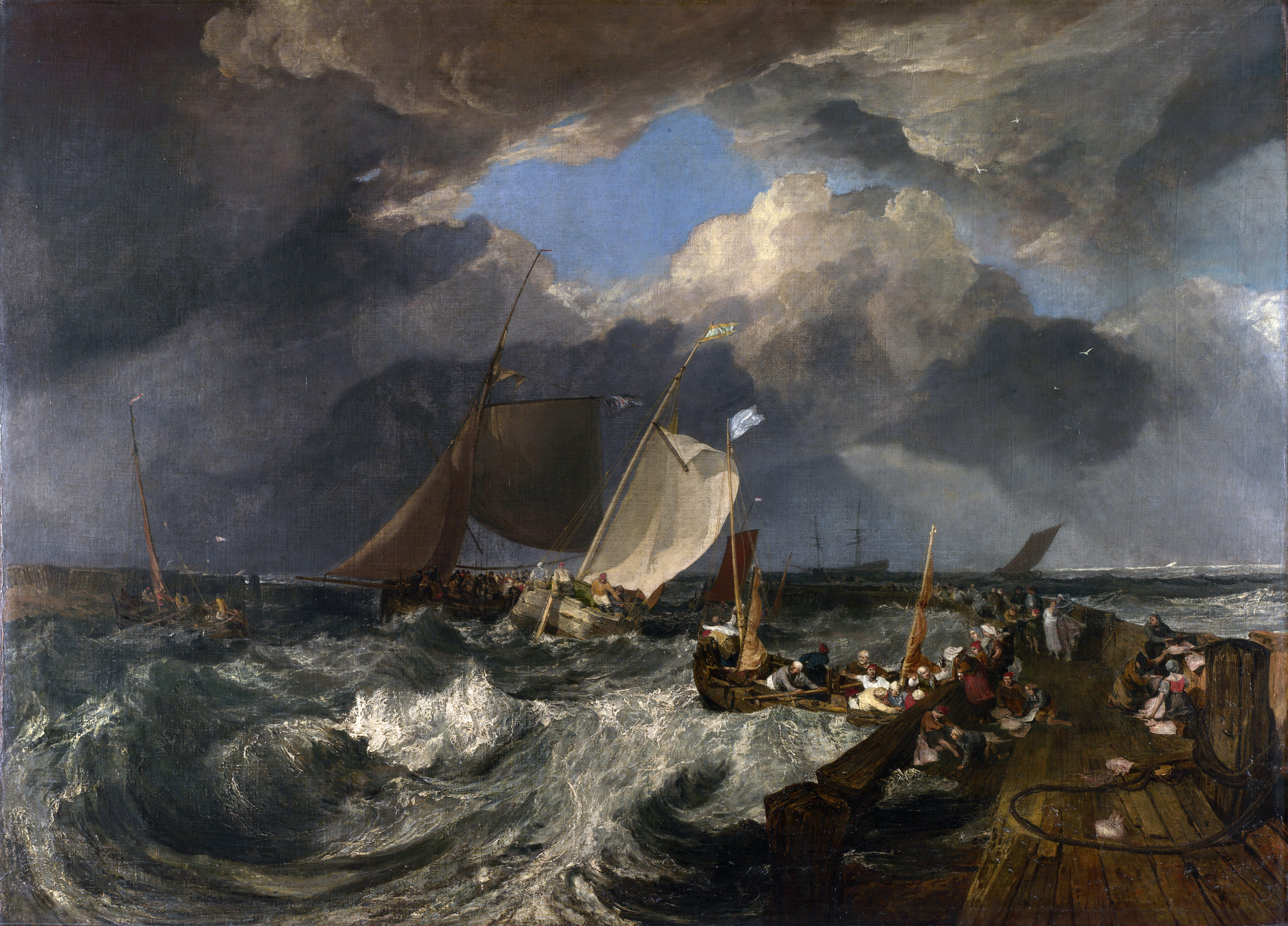
- Artist: J. M. W. Turner
- Year: 1803
- Type: Oil on canvas
- Dimensions: 172 cm × 240 cm (68 in × 94 in)
- Location: National Gallery, London

Calais Pier is a landscape painting by the British artist J. M. W. Turner, painted in 1803 and exhibited at the Royal Academy's Summer Exhibition the same year. The painting's full title is Calais Pier, with French Poissards preparing for Sea: an English Packet arriving. The painting shows a British packet boat arriving in the harbour.

The painting was inspired by a visit Turner made to Calais, France, the previous year when the Peace of Amiens led to a brief break in the French Revolutionary War against France. Having made the crossing during stormy weather, his ship was stuck outside the harbour for some time during which he made a number of sketches. After transferring to the pilot boat he nearly drowned while getting ashore. It was also a clever allusion to the concerns about the political situation in Europe.

Turner's contemporary John Constable was privately critical of both this work and Turner's The Opening of the Vintage of Macon after viewing them at the Royal Academy, as he felt the artist had become "more and more extravagant and less attentive to nature". However, art critic John Ruskin later hailed it as the first painting to display "Turner's colossal power".

The work is now in the collection of the National Gallery having been part of the Turner Bequest of 1856.

== See also ==
- List of paintings by J. M. W. Turner

== Bibliography ==
- Hamilton, James. Constable: A Portrait. Hachette UK, 2022.
- Hamilton, James. Turner - A Life. Sceptre, 1998.
- Robinson, Alan. Imagining London, 1770-1900. Springer, 2004.
