= Portrait of Joseph Bonaparte =

Painting by François Gérard

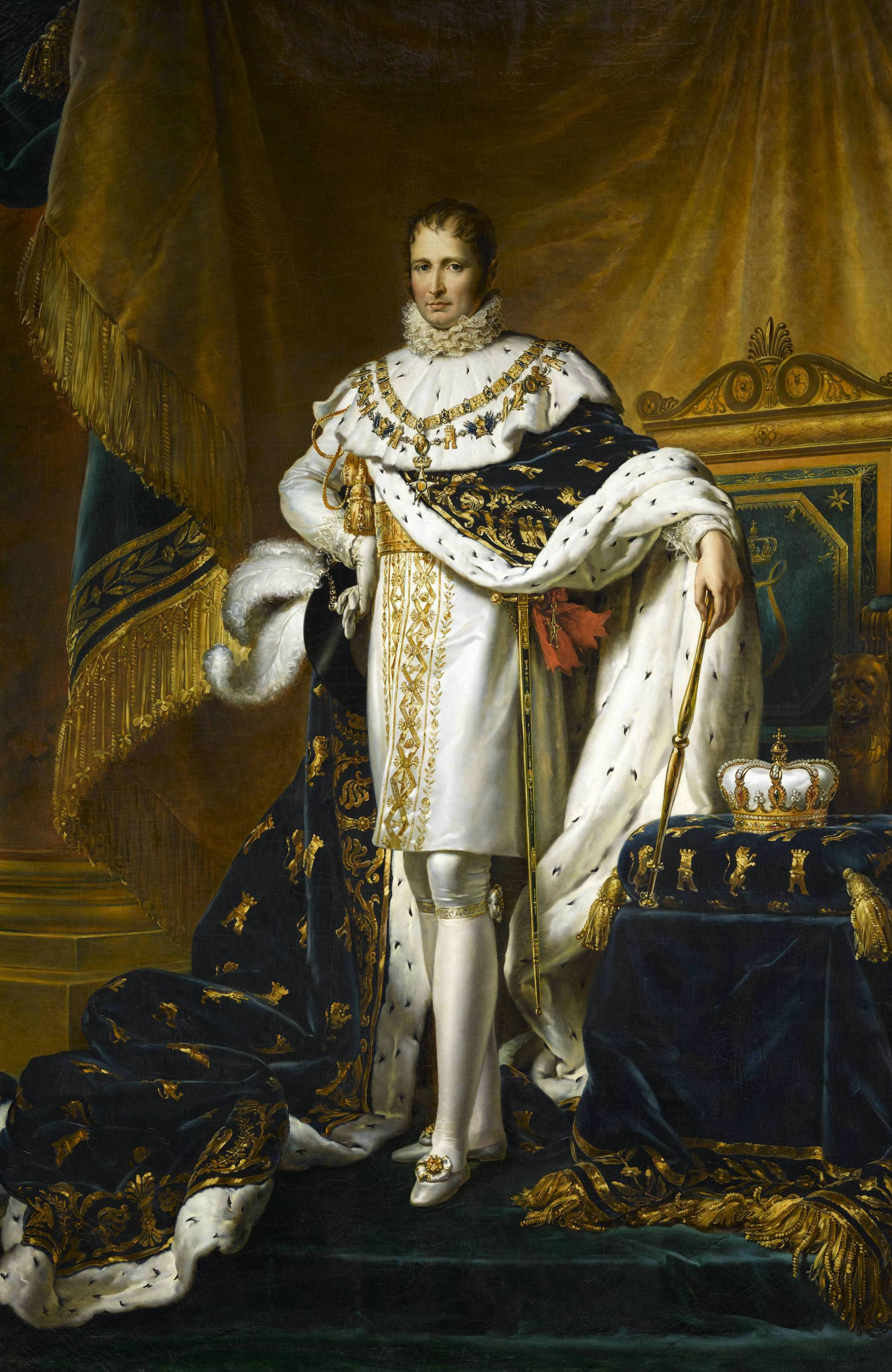
- Artist: François Gérard
- Year: 1808
- Type: Oil on canvas, portrait painting
- Dimensions: 244 cm × 162 cm (96 in × 64 in)
- Location: Palace of Fontainebleau; Fontainebleau

Portrait of Joseph Bonaparte is an 1808 portrait painting by the French artist François Gérard. It depicts Joseph Bonaparte, recently created King of Spain, in his coronation robes. Joseph, the elder brother of Napoleon, had been King of Naples until he had been placed on the throne of Spain which triggered the Peninsular War.

Gérard, a neoclassical painter and pupil of Jacques-Louis David, produced a number of depictions of the extended Bonaparte dynasty. Today the painting is in the collection of the Palace of Fontainebleau outside Paris, having been acquired in 1981.

== See also ==
- Napoleon I as Emperor, an 1805 portrait by Gérard
- Portrait of Jérôme Bonaparte, an 1811 portrait by Gérard

== Bibliography ==
- Dwyer, Philip. Citizen Emperor: Napoleon in Power. ISBN 0300212534. Yale University Press, 2013.
- Nicholls, David. Napoleon: A Biographical Companion. ISBN 0874369576. Bloomsbury Academic, 1999.
