= Royal Academy Exhibition of 1804 =

1804 art exhibition in London

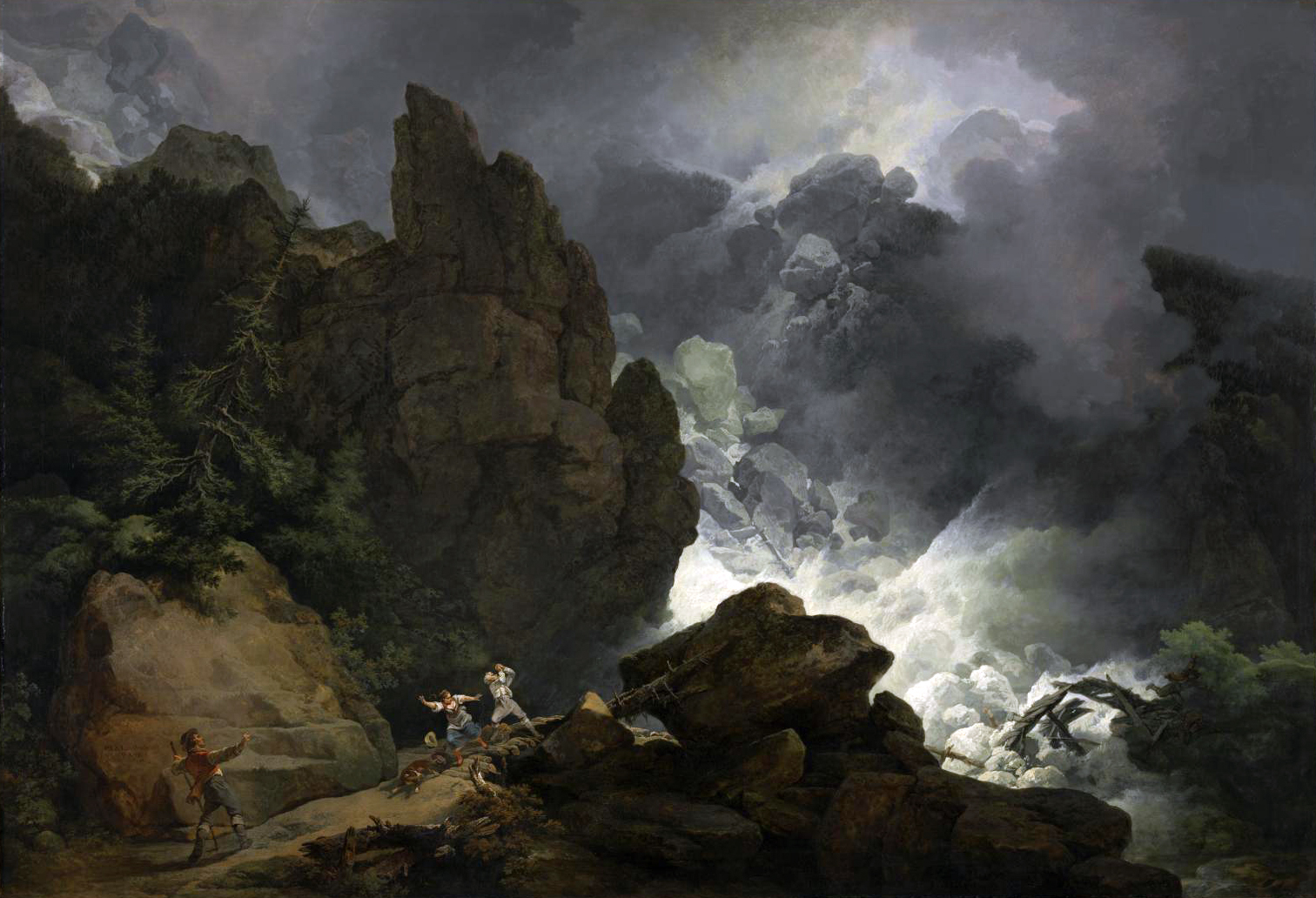
An Avalanche in the Alps by Philip James de Loutherbourg

The Royal Academy Exhibition of 1804 was the thirty sixth annual Summer Exhibition of the British Royal Academy of Arts. It was held at Somerset House in London between 30 April and 16 June 1804 and featured submissions from leading artists and architects of the later Georgian era.

The exhibition continued the dispute from the previous year of as a faction of artists led by John Singleton Copley tried to undermine the authority of Copley's fellow American Benjamin West as President of the Royal Academy. West defiantly displayed Hagar and Ishmael a reworked painting that had caused controversy the previous year. J.M.W. Turner submitted two oil paintings and a watercolour, a limited offering by his usual standards. The following year he chose not to display at the Academy at all and held a private exhibition in his own studio. John Constable did not submit any works in 1804.

James Ward submitted a landscape featuring bulls fighting but his fellow Academicians criticised it as being too derivative of Rubens and he withdrew it. Through his place on the hanging committee the landscape painter Joseph Farington was extremely influential in securing the positioning of various artworks.

== Gallery ==
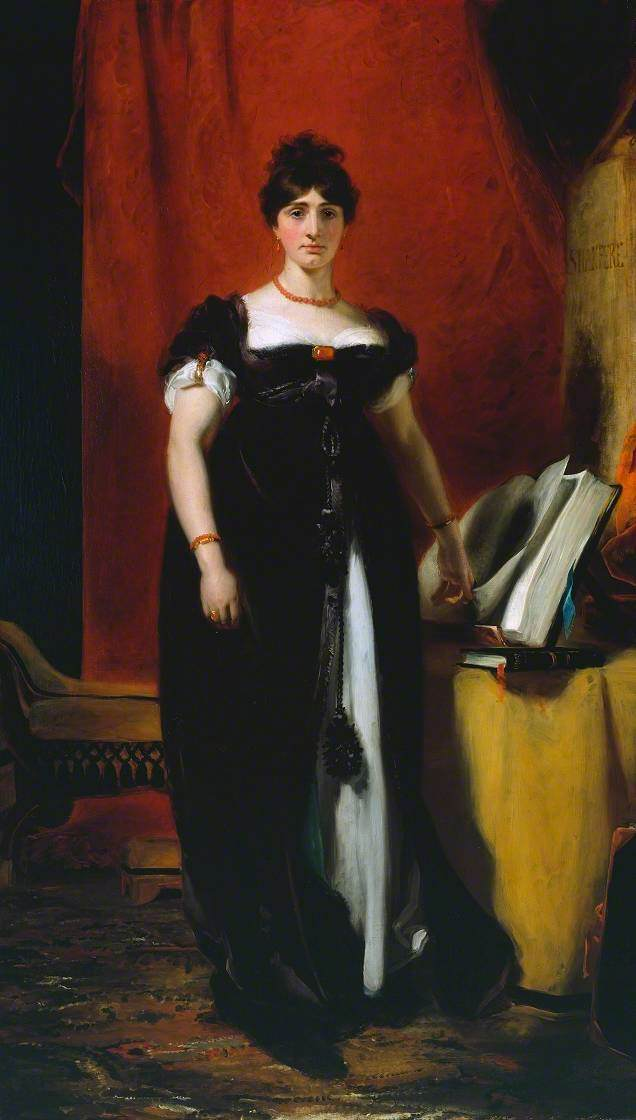
Portrait of Sarah Siddons by Thomas Lawrence

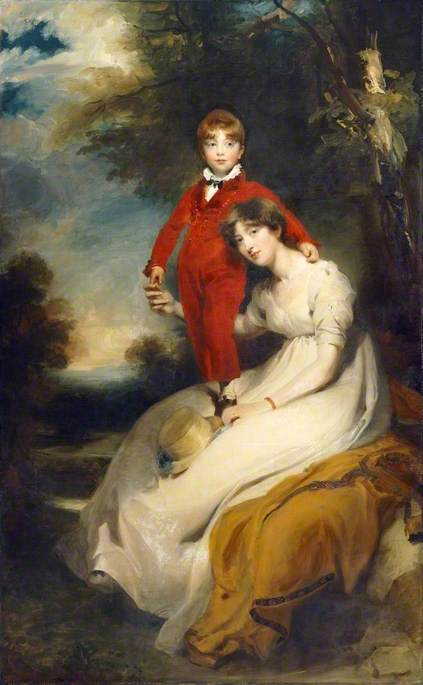
Sabine Thellusson and Son by Thomas Lawrence

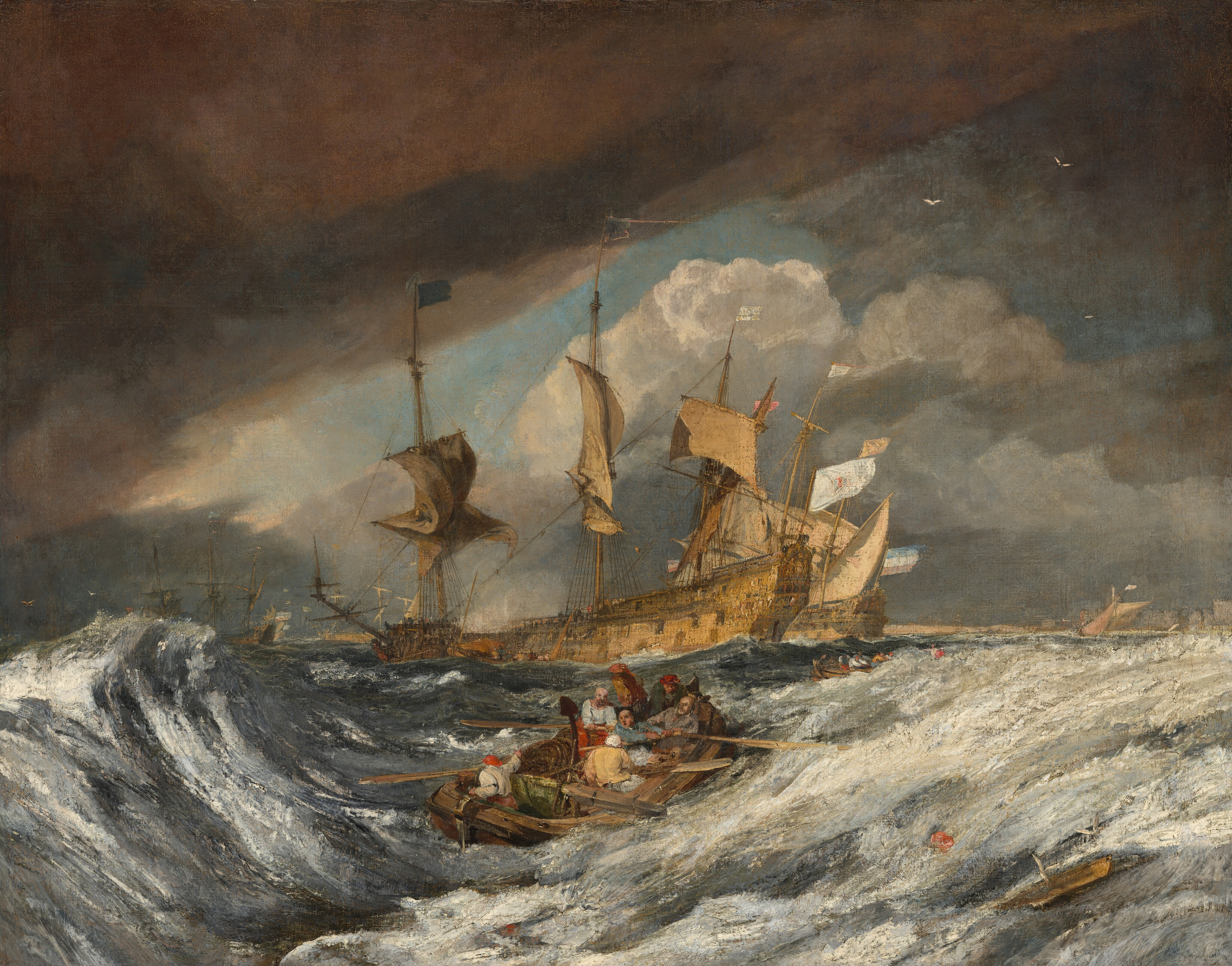
Boats Carrying Out Anchors and Cables to the Dutch Men of War by J.M.W. Turner

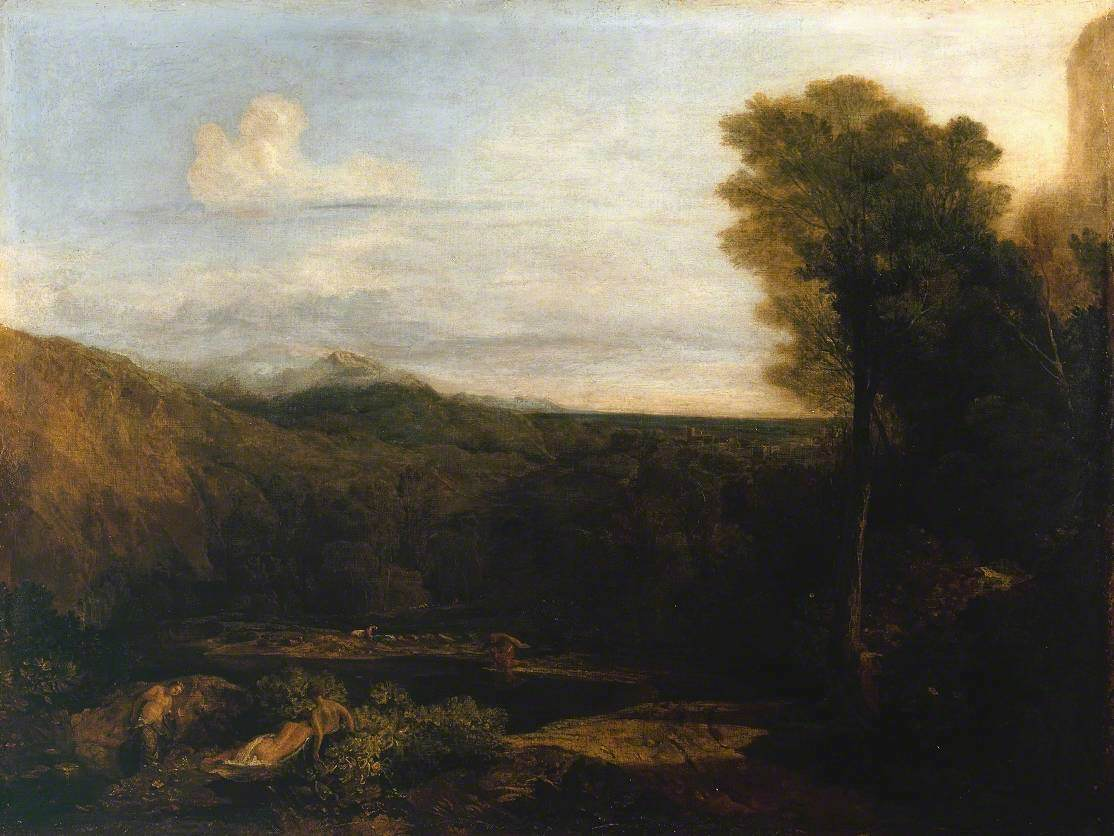
Narcissus and Echo by J.M.W. Turner

Old Margate Pier by J.M.W. Turner

Tiger Hunting by James Northcote

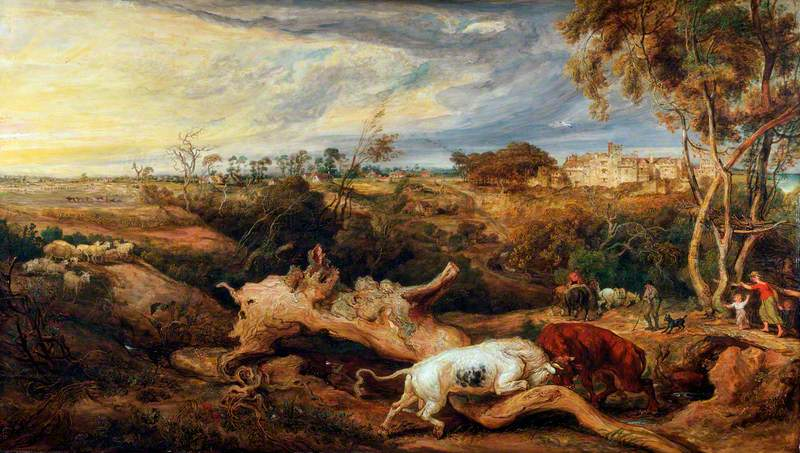
Bulls Fighting in a Landscape by James Ward

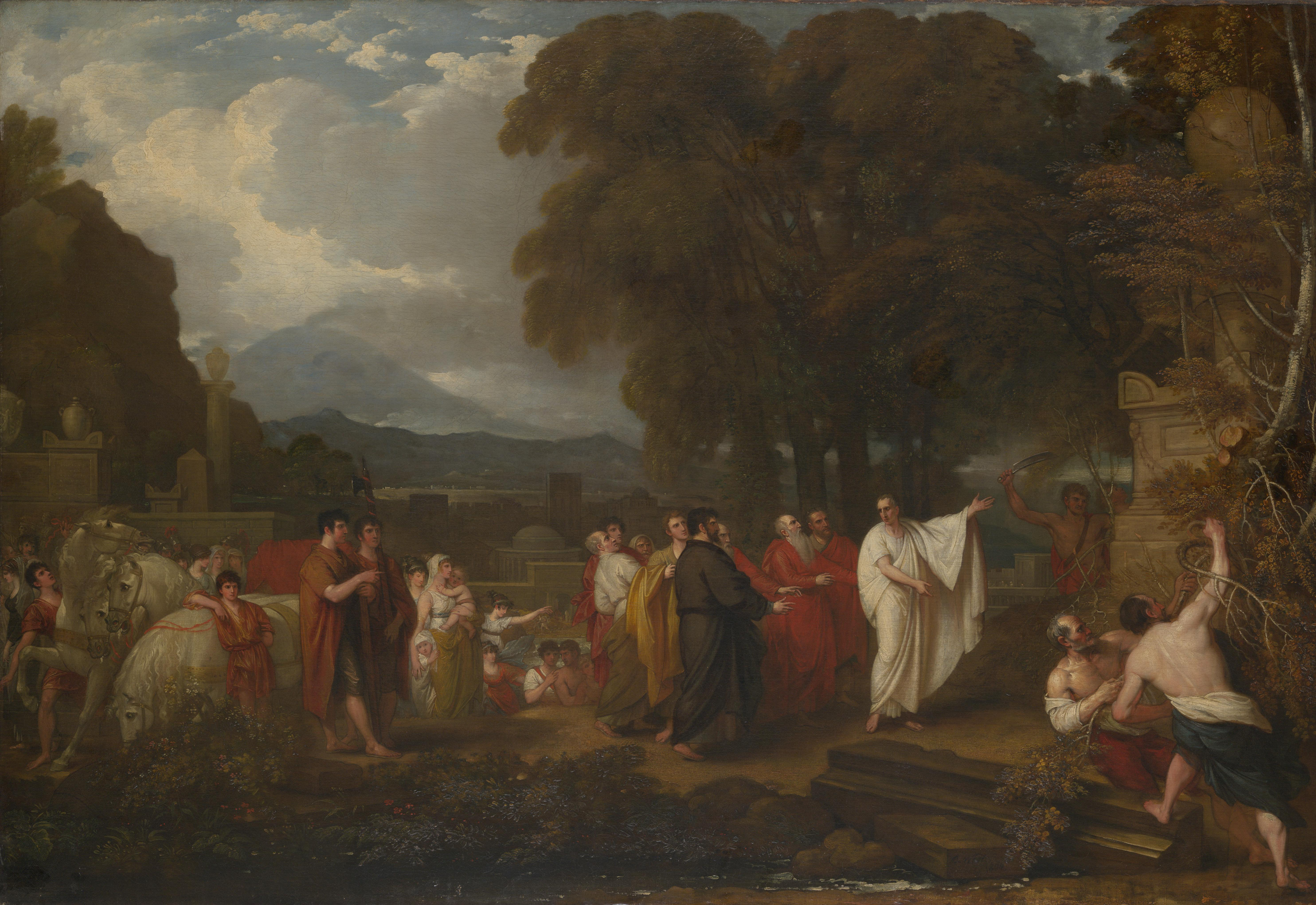
Cicero Discovering the Tomb of Archimedes by Benjamin West

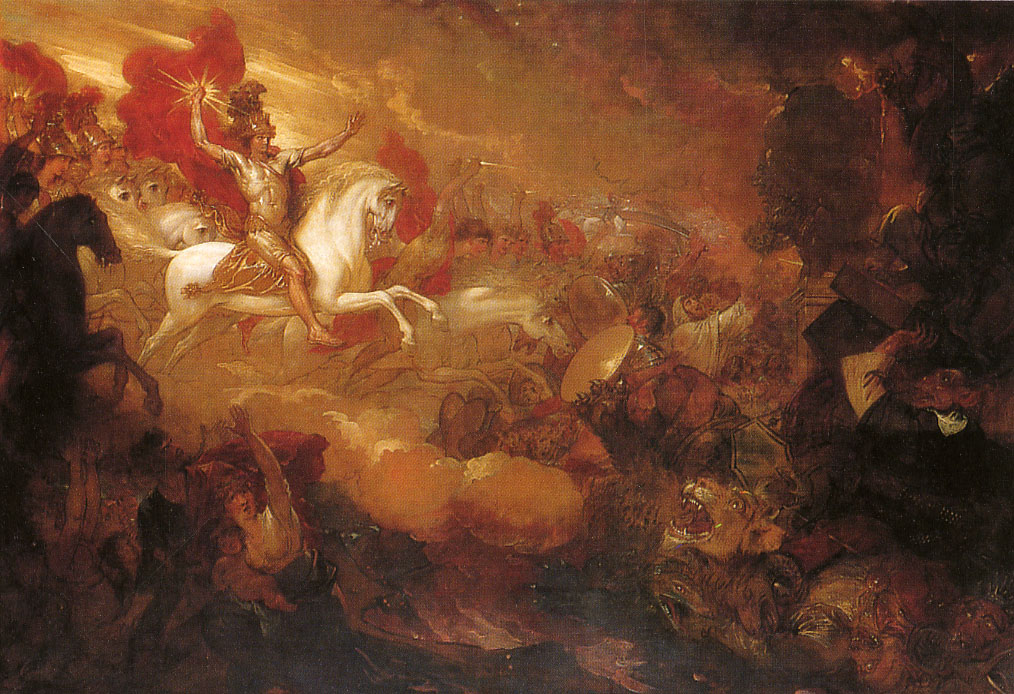
Destruction of the Beast and the False Prophet by Benjamin West

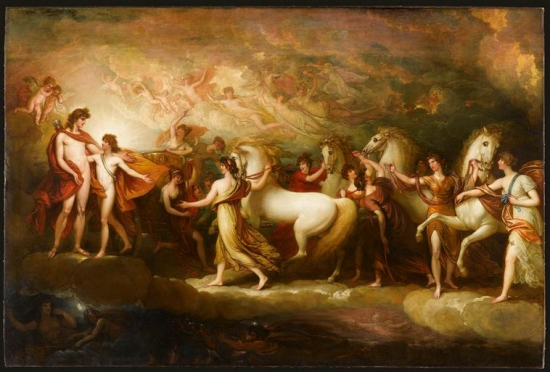
Phaeton Asking Apollo to Drive the Sun Chariot by Benjamin West

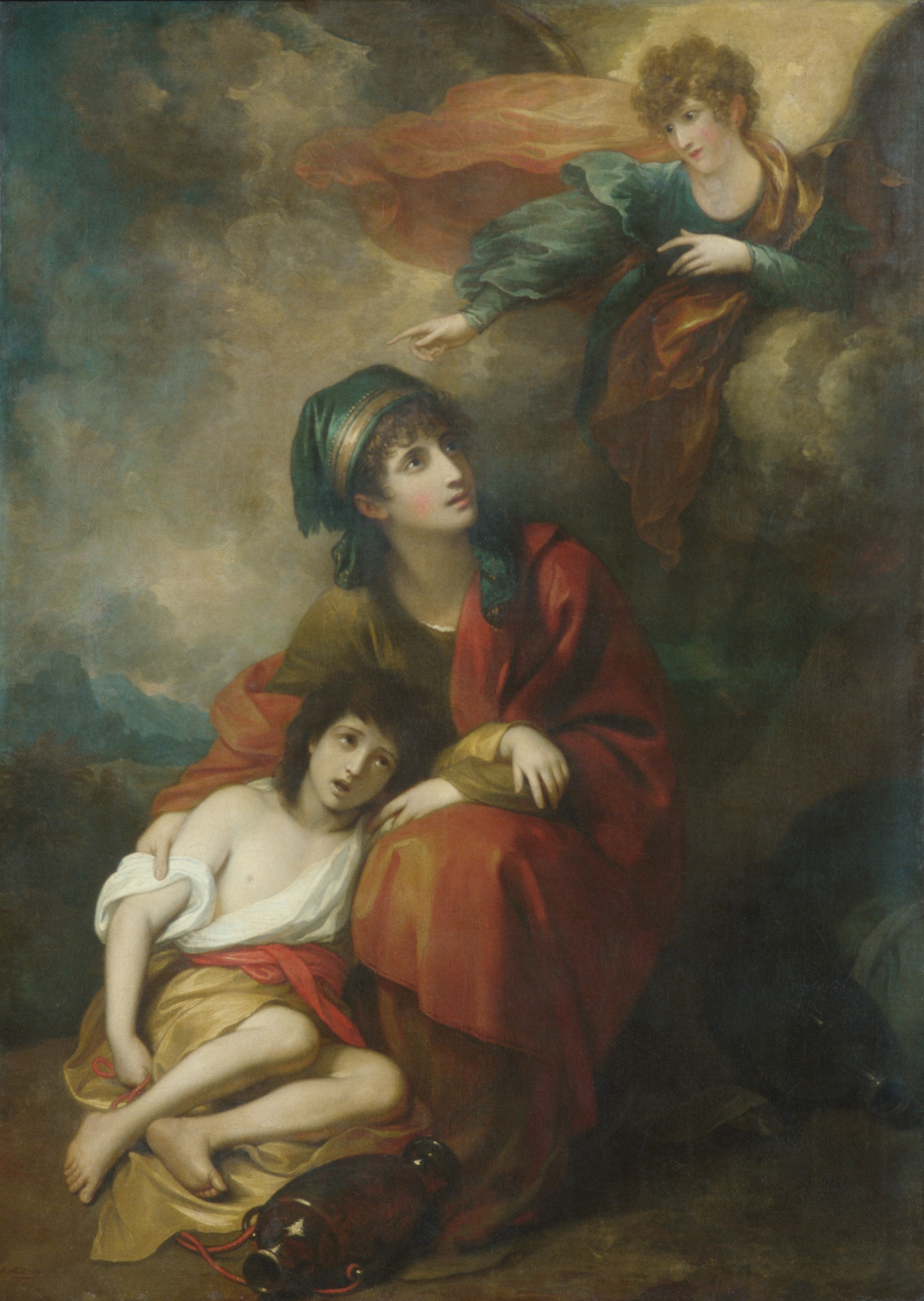
Hagar and Ishamel by Benjamin West

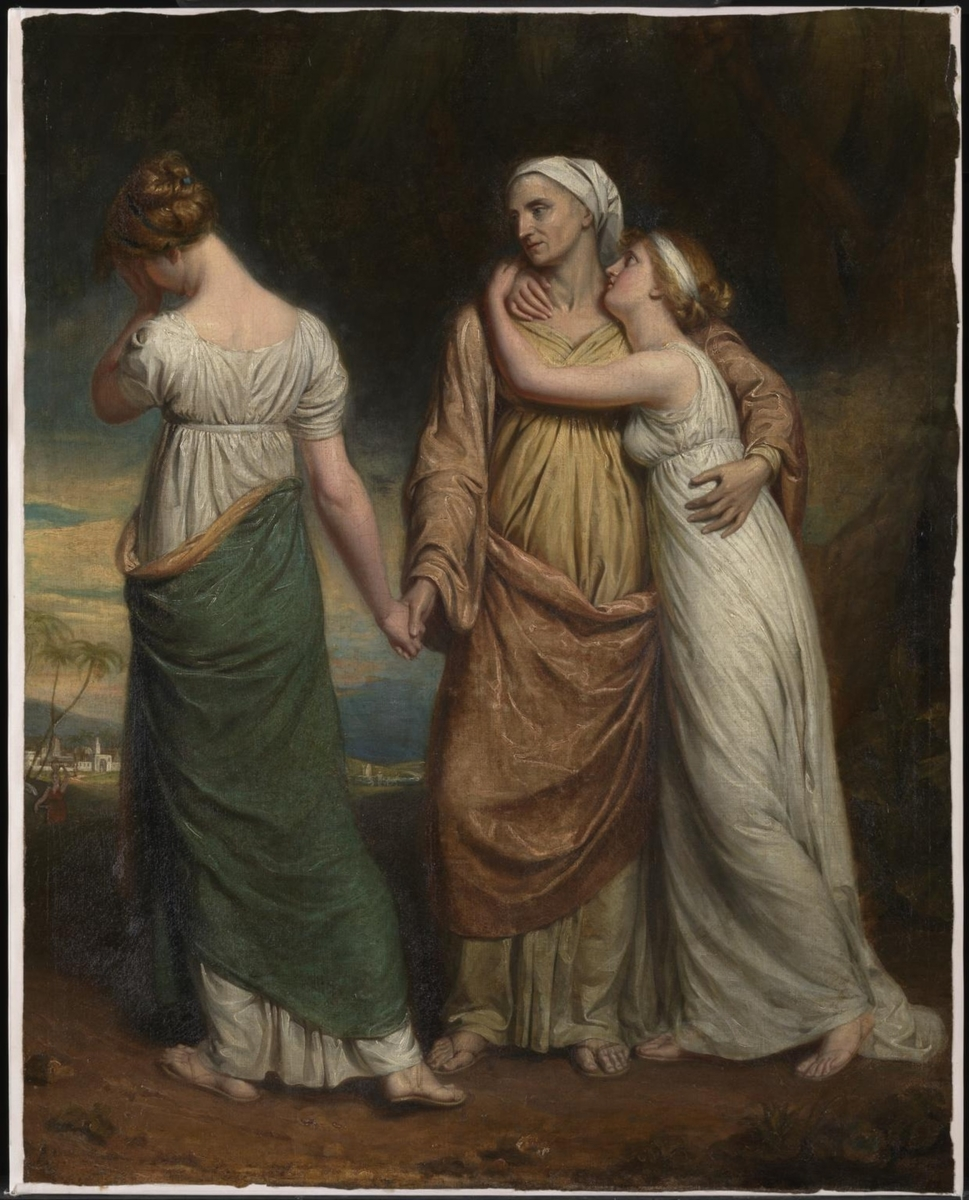
Naomi and her Daughters by George Dawe

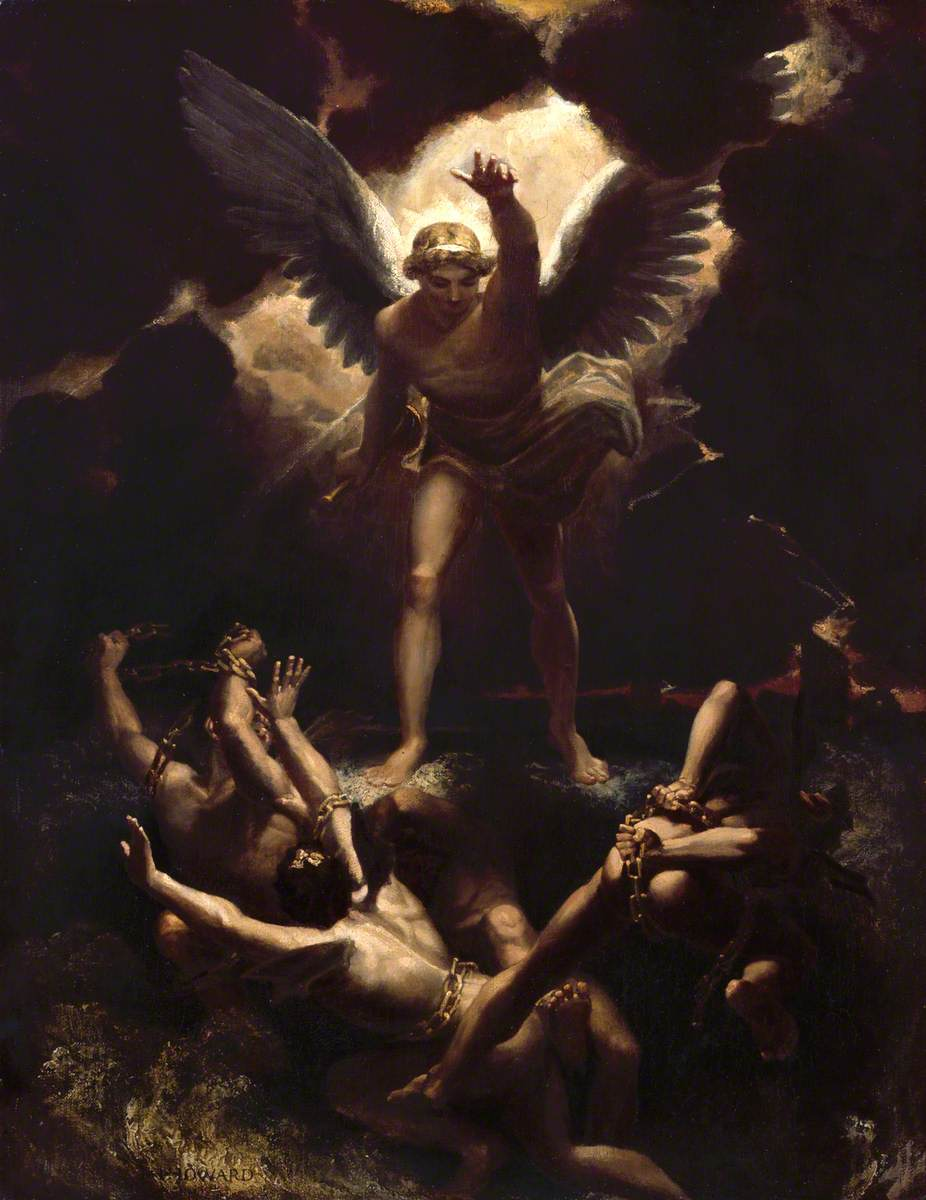
The Sixth Trumpet Soundeth by Henry Howard

Henry III Replying to the Bishops by Richard Westall

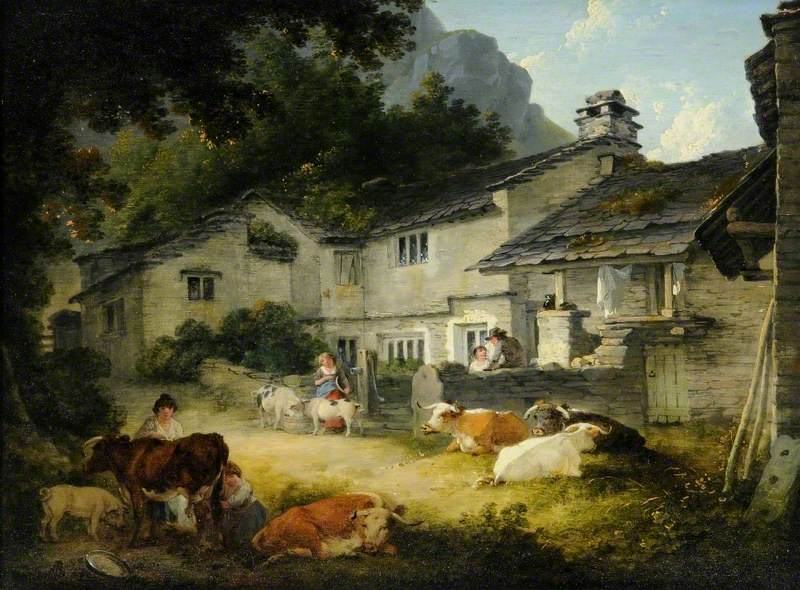
Cottage in Ambleside by Julius Caesar Ibbetson

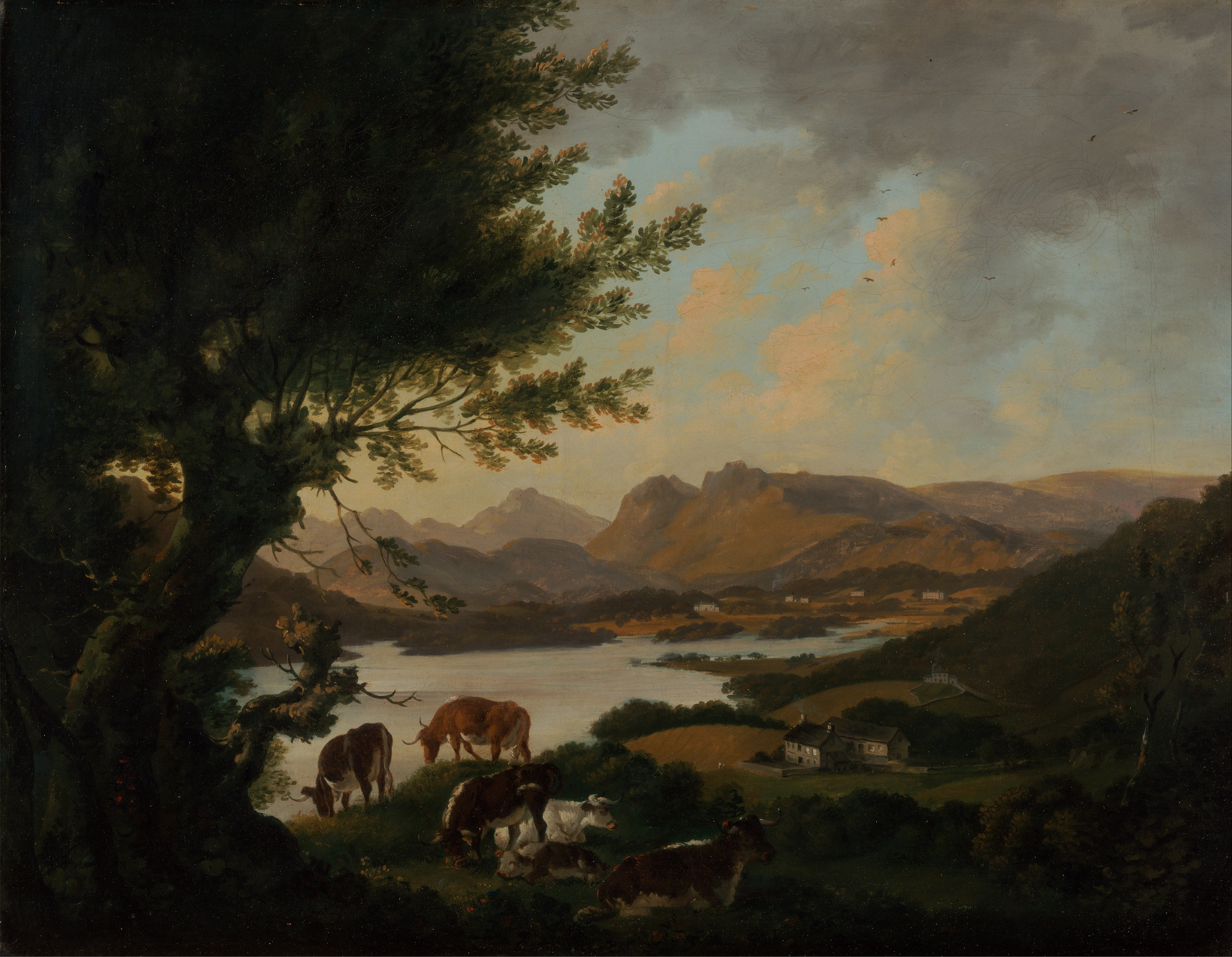
Lake Windemere by Julius Caesar Ibbetson

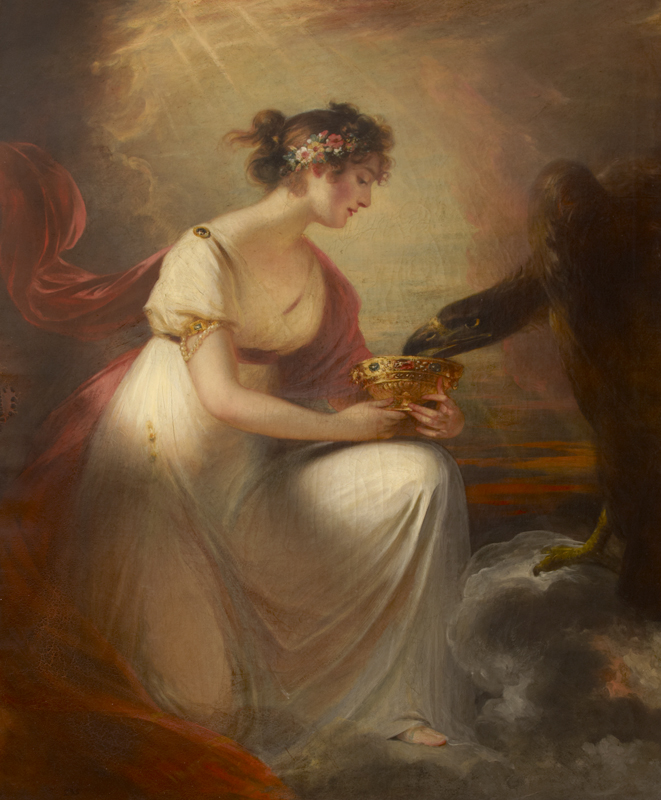
Frances Wyndham as Hebe by William Beechey

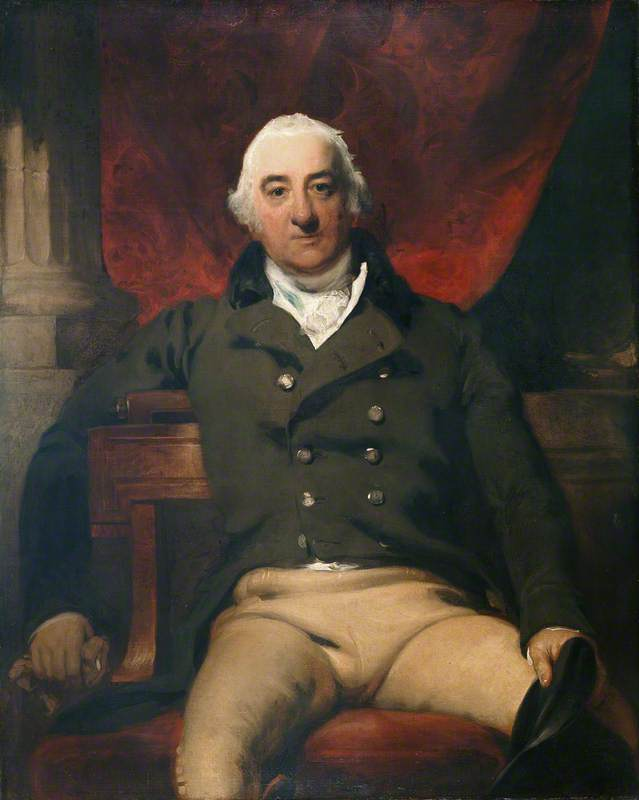
Portrait of James Curtis by Thomas Lawrence

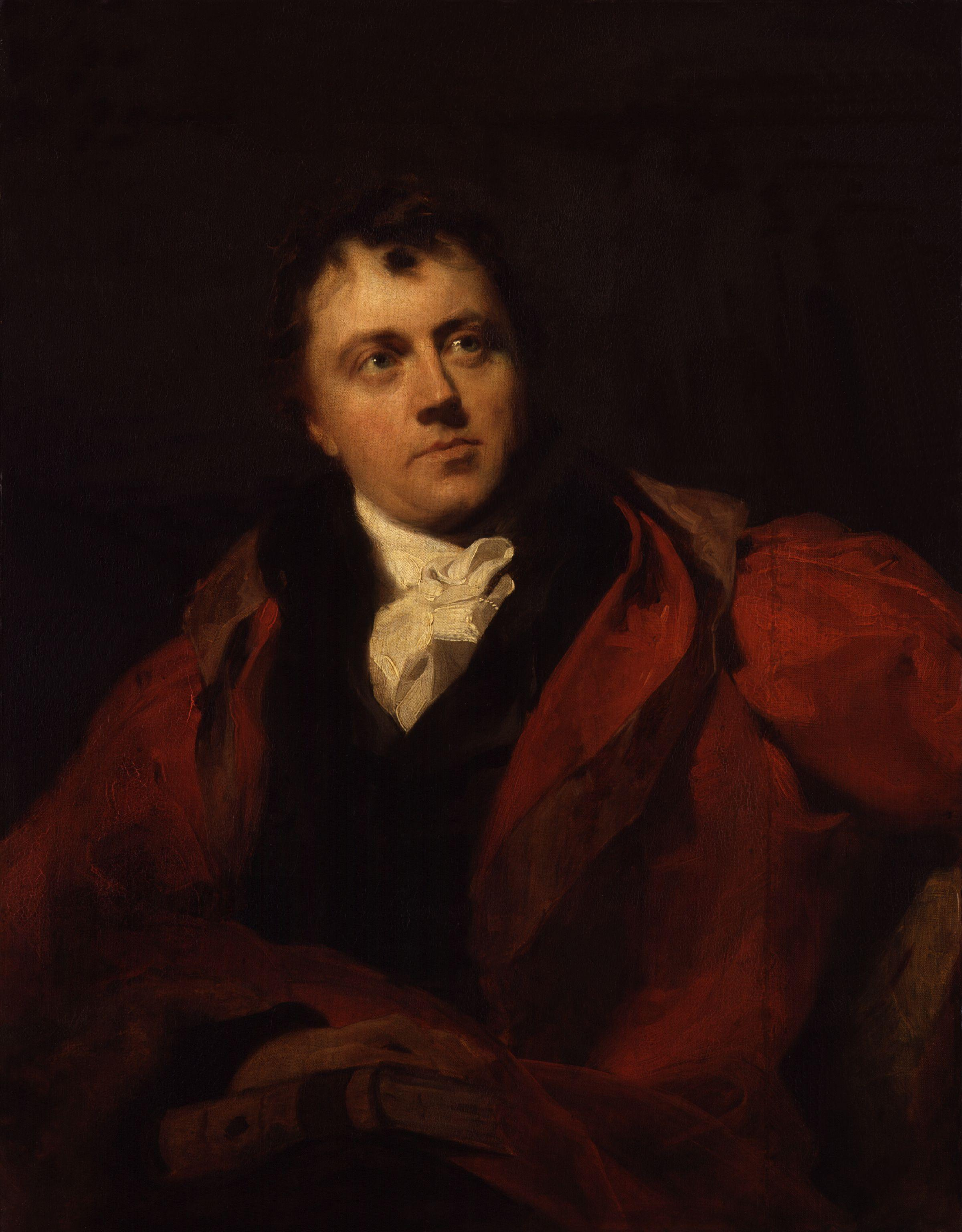
Portrait of James Mackintosh by Thomas Lawrence

Portrait of Mary Montagu and Her Brother by John Singleton Copley

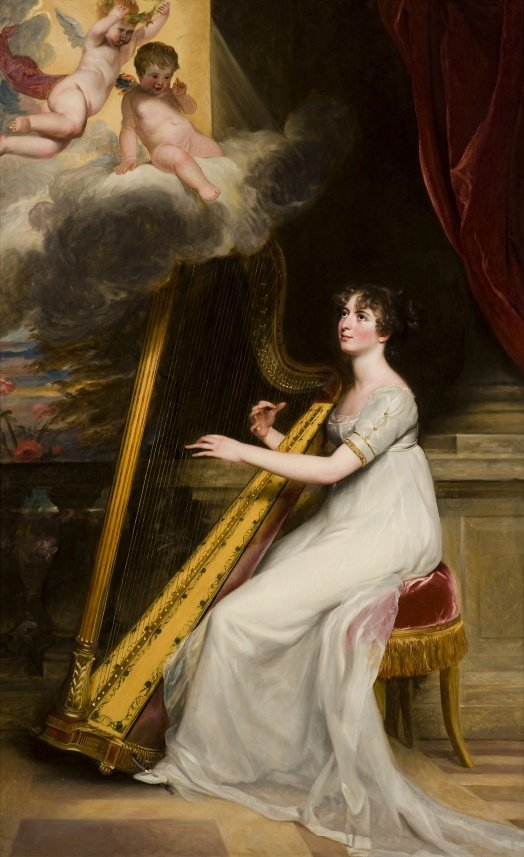
Mrs. Richard Crowninshield Derby as St. Cecilia by John Singleton Copley

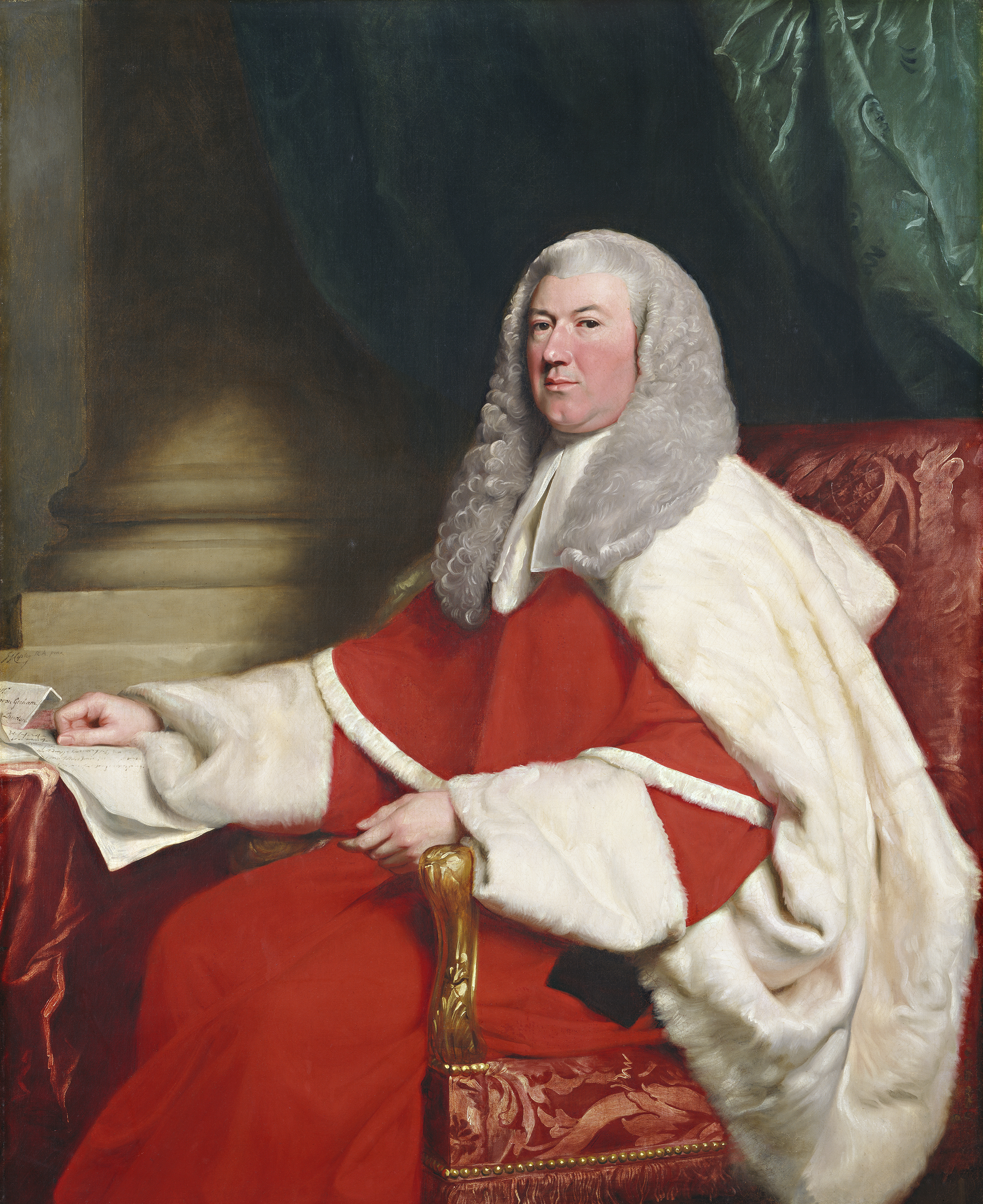
Portrait of Robert Graham by John Singleton Copley

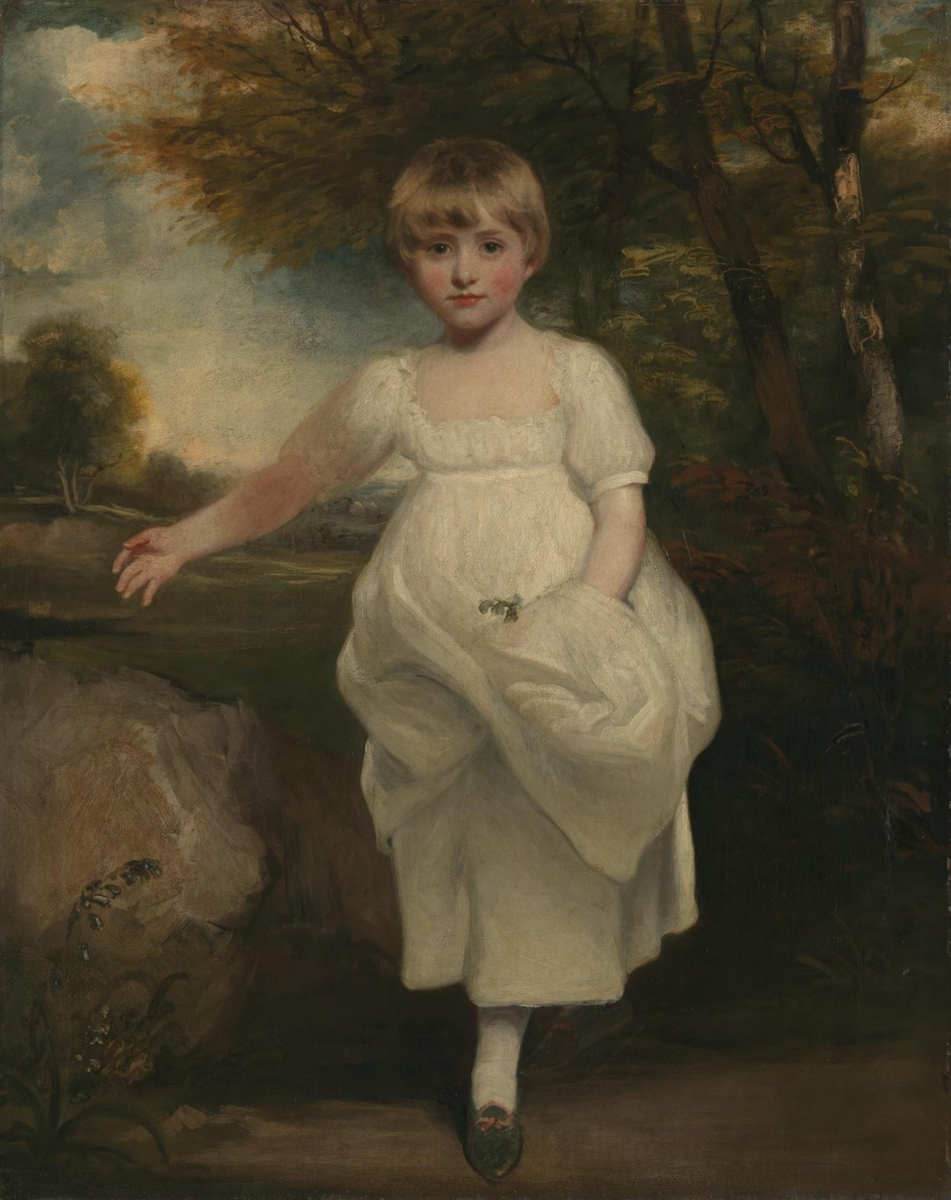
Portrait of Harriet Cholmondeley by John Hoppner

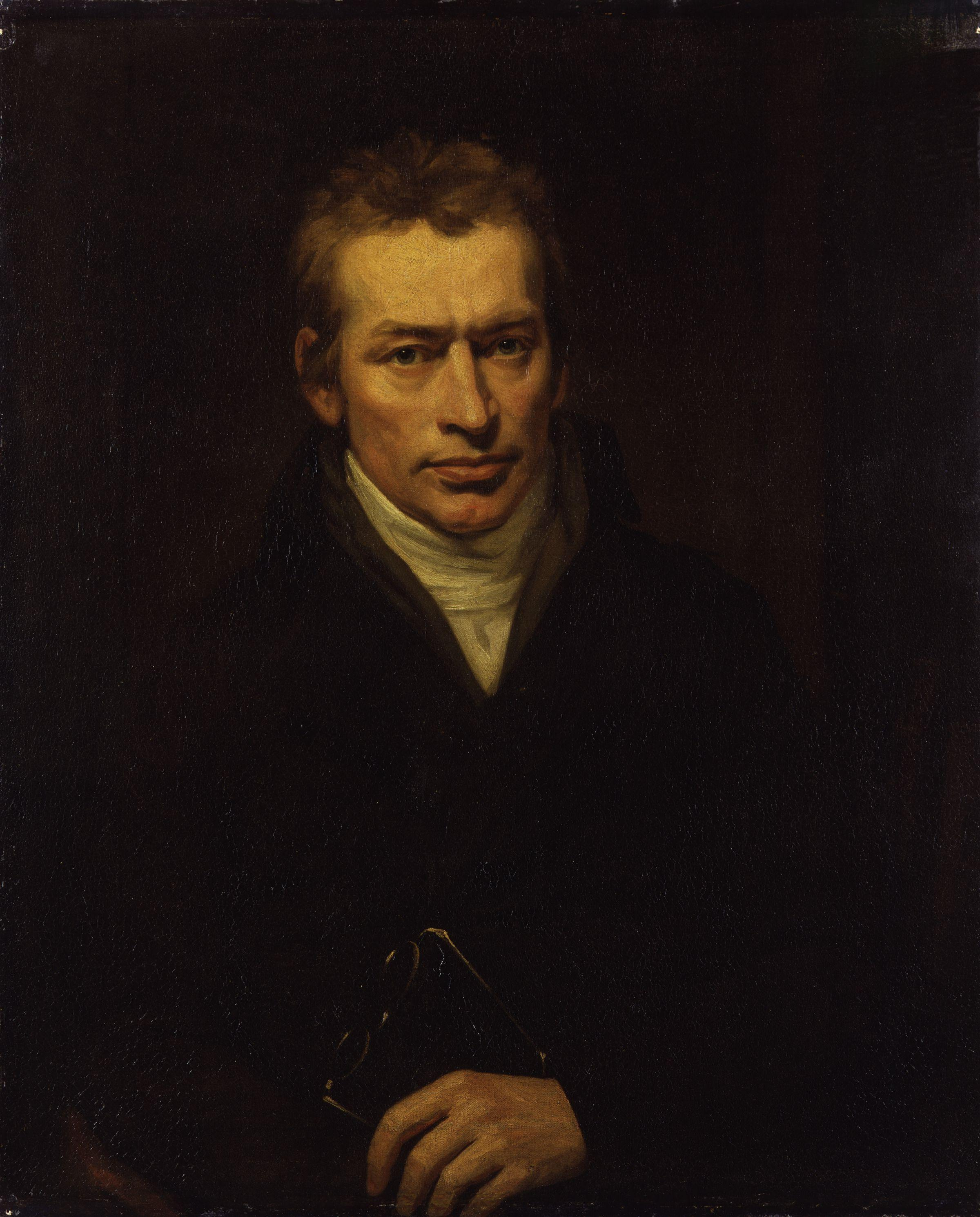
Portrait of Thomas Holcroft by John Opie

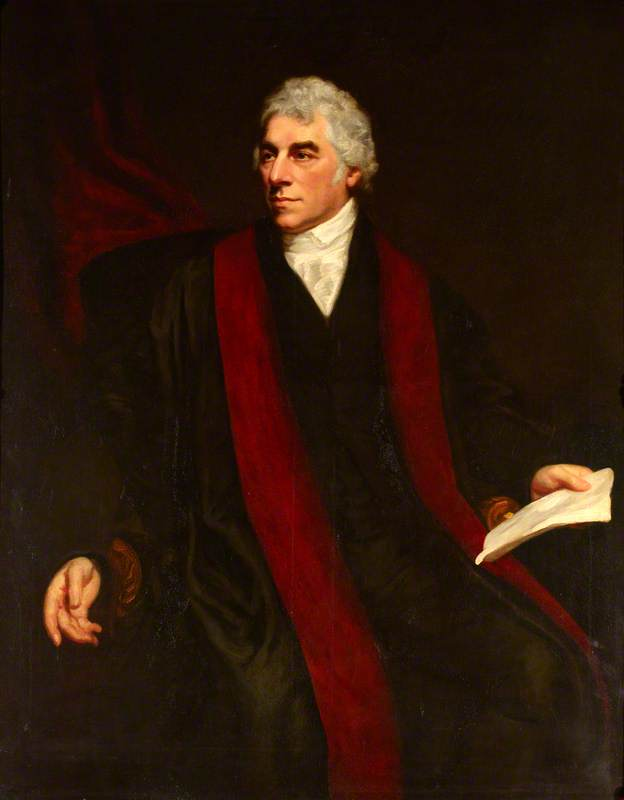
Portrait of William Blizard by John Opie

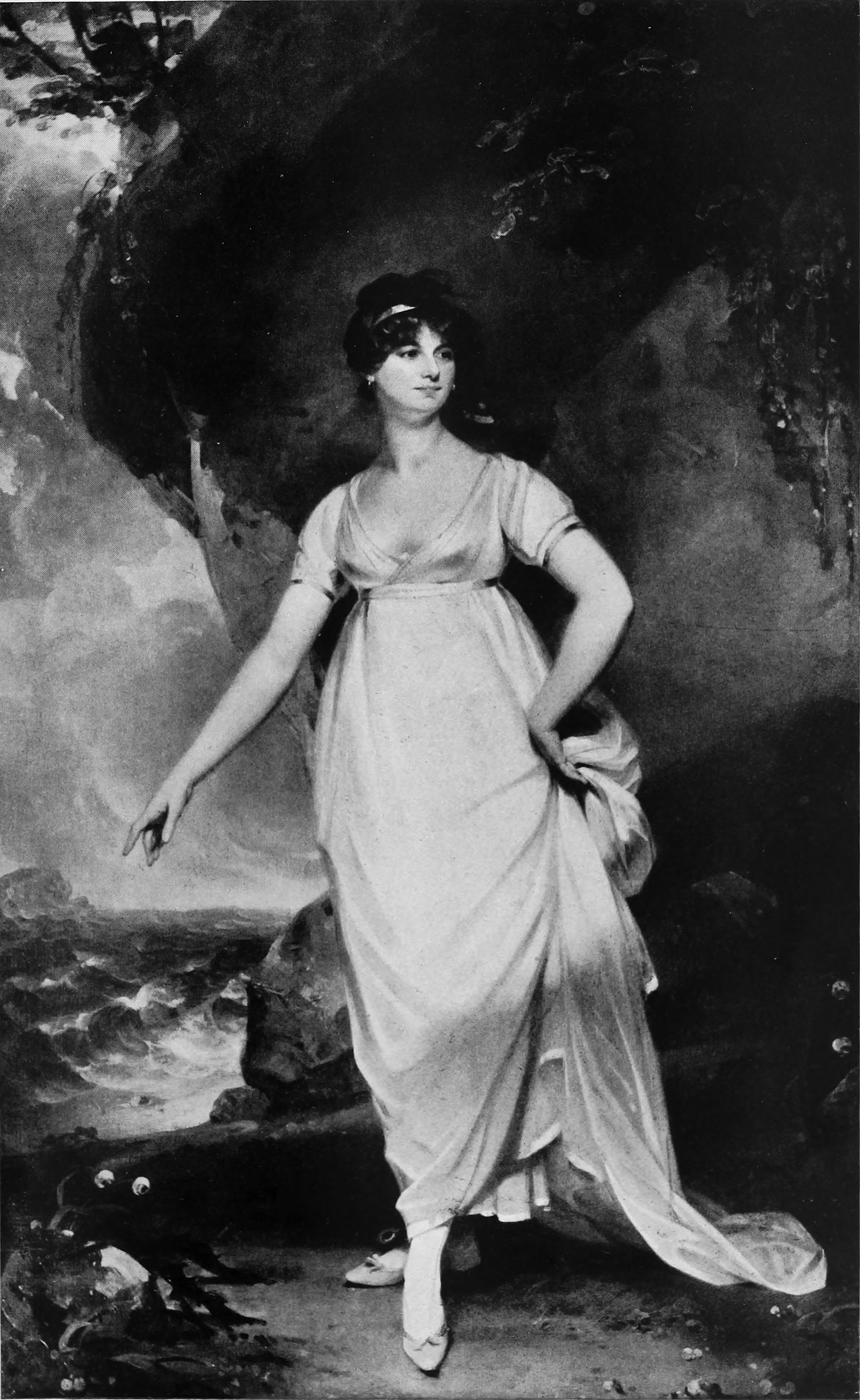
Mrs Williamson as Miranda by Martin Archer Shee

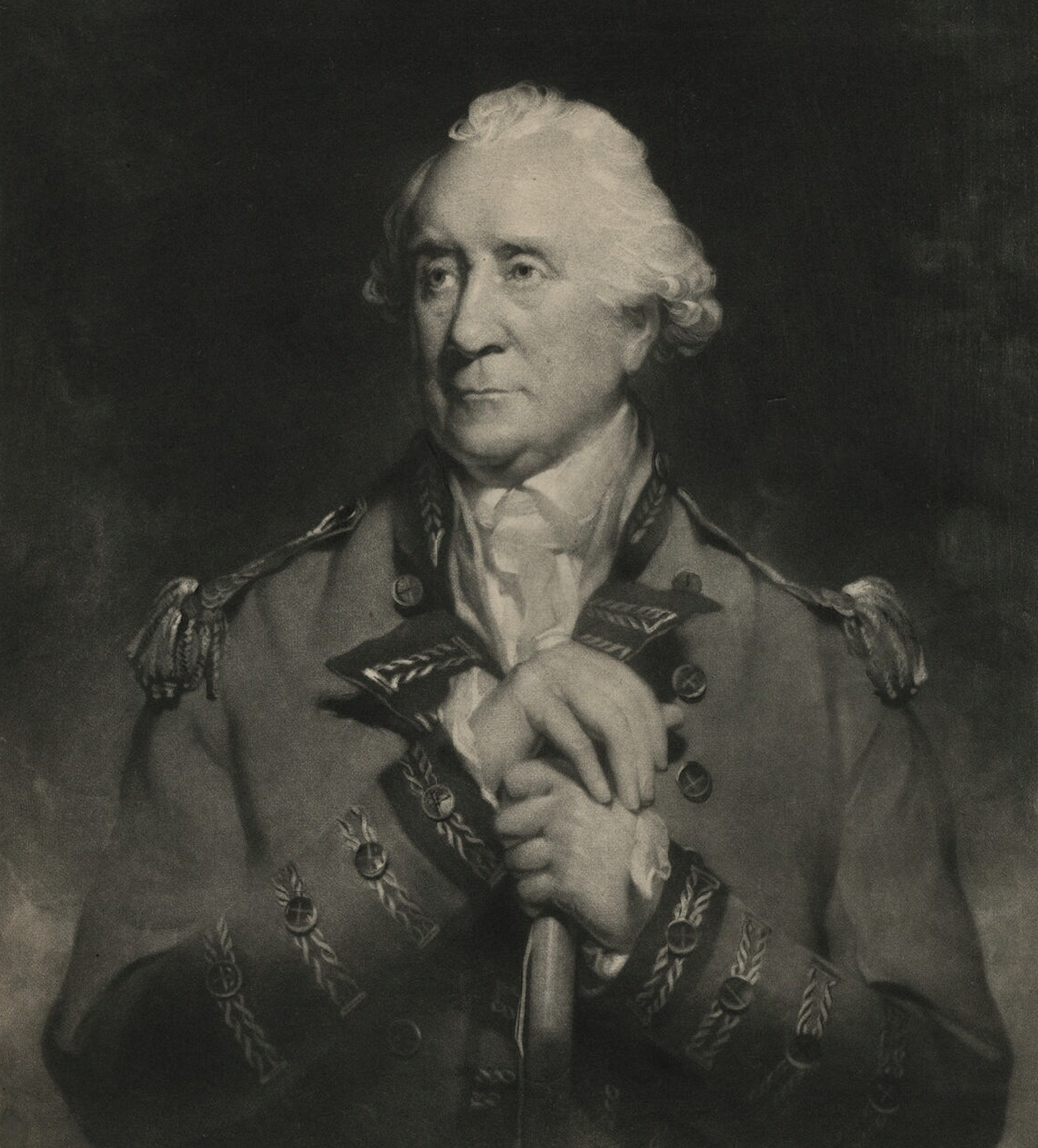
Portrait of Patrick Tonyn, mezzotint based on the painting by Martin Archer Shee

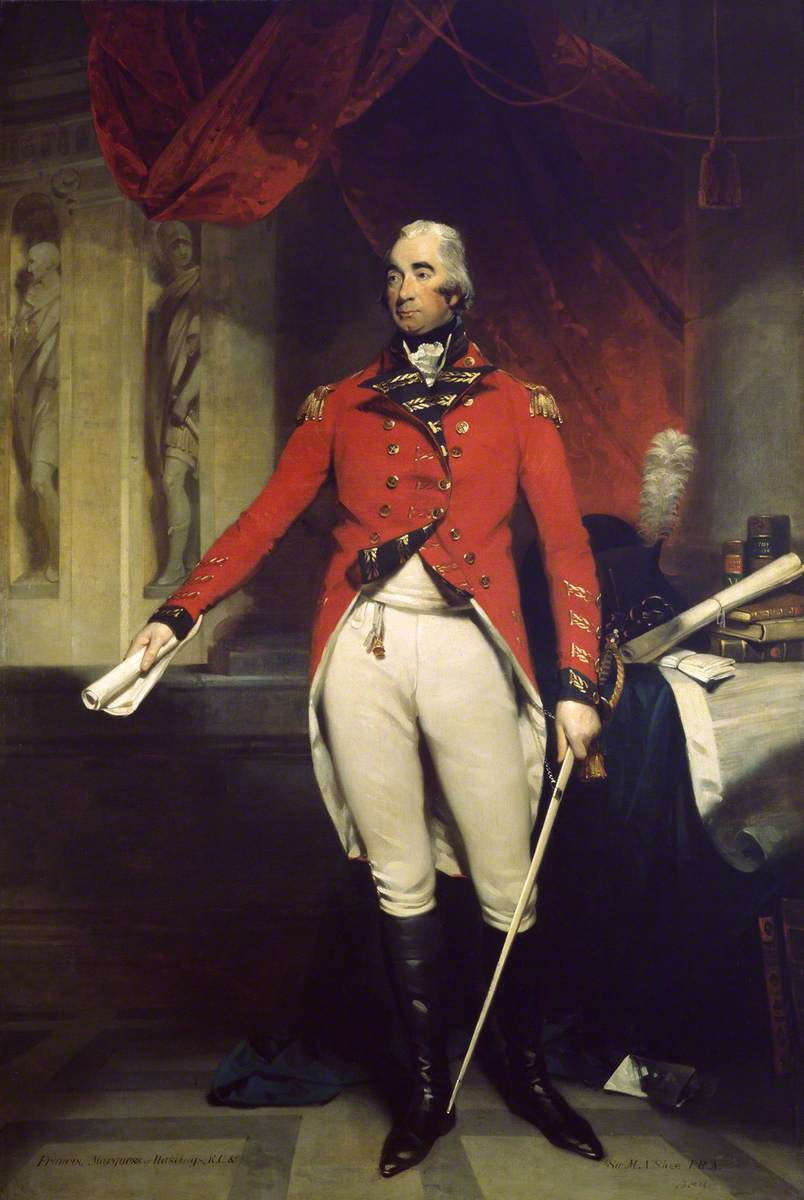
Portrait of the Earl of Moira by Martin Archer Shee

== Bibliography ==
- Albinson, Cassandra, Funnell, Peter & Peltz, Lucy. Thomas Lawrence: Regency Power and Brilliance. Yale University Press, 2010.
- Bailey, Anthony. J.M.W. Turner: Standing in the Sun. Tate Enterprises Ltd, 2013.
- Costello, Leo. J.M.W. Turner and the Subject of History. Routledge, 2017.
- Levey, Michael. Sir Thomas Lawrence. Yale University Press, 2005.
- Reynolds, Graham. Constable's England. Metropolitan Museum of Art, 1983.
- Spencer-Longhurst, Paul. The Sun Rising Through Vapour: Turner's Early Seascapes. Third Millennium Information, 2003.
