= Boats Carrying Out Anchors and Cables to the Dutch Men of War =

Painting by J. M. W. Turner

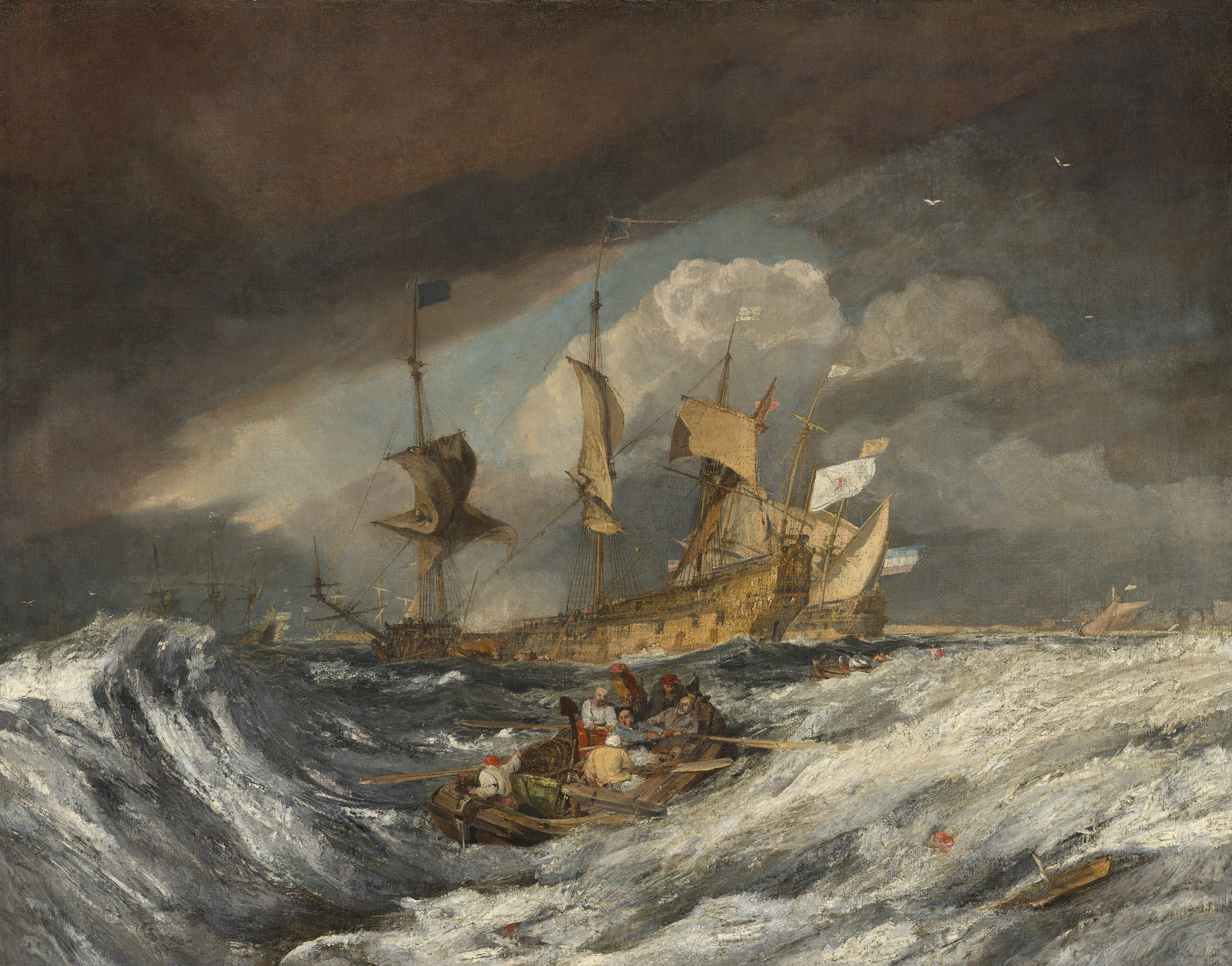
- Artist: J. M. W. Turner
- Year: 1804
- Type: Oil on canvas, landscape painting
- Dimensions: 101.6 cm × 130.8 cm (40.0 in × 51.5 in)
- Location: National Gallery of Art, Washington, D.C.

Boats Carrying Out Anchors and Cables to the Dutch Men of War is an 1804 oil painting by the British artist J.M.W. Turner. A historical seascape depicts a scene from 1665. It has been suggested that Turner may have been warning about the danger of Napoleonic France repeating the Dutch attack on the Royal Navy fleet during the Raid on the Medway in the Second Anglo-Dutch War.

The painting was displayed at the Royal Academy Exhibition of 1804 held at Somerset House in London. It was acquired by the banker and art collector Samuel Dobrée, and in 1827 along with the Iveagh Sea Piece it was bought by Lord Delamere. today it is in the National Gallery of Art in Washington, having been acquired from the Corcoran Gallery of Art in 2014.

== See also ==
- List of paintings by J. M. W. Turner

== Bibliography ==
- Bailey, Anthony. J.M.W. Turner: Standing in the Sun. Tate Enterprises, 2013.
- Bryant, Juliua. Kenwood: Catalogue of Paintings in the Iveagh Bequest. Yale University Pewss, 2003.
- Cusack, Tricia (ed.) Art and Identity at the Water's Edge. Taylor & Francis, 2017.
- Spencer-Longhurst, Paul. The Sun Rising Through Vapour: Turner's Early Seascapes. Third Millennium Information, 2003.
