= Portrait of Jérôme Bonaparte =

Painting by François Gérard

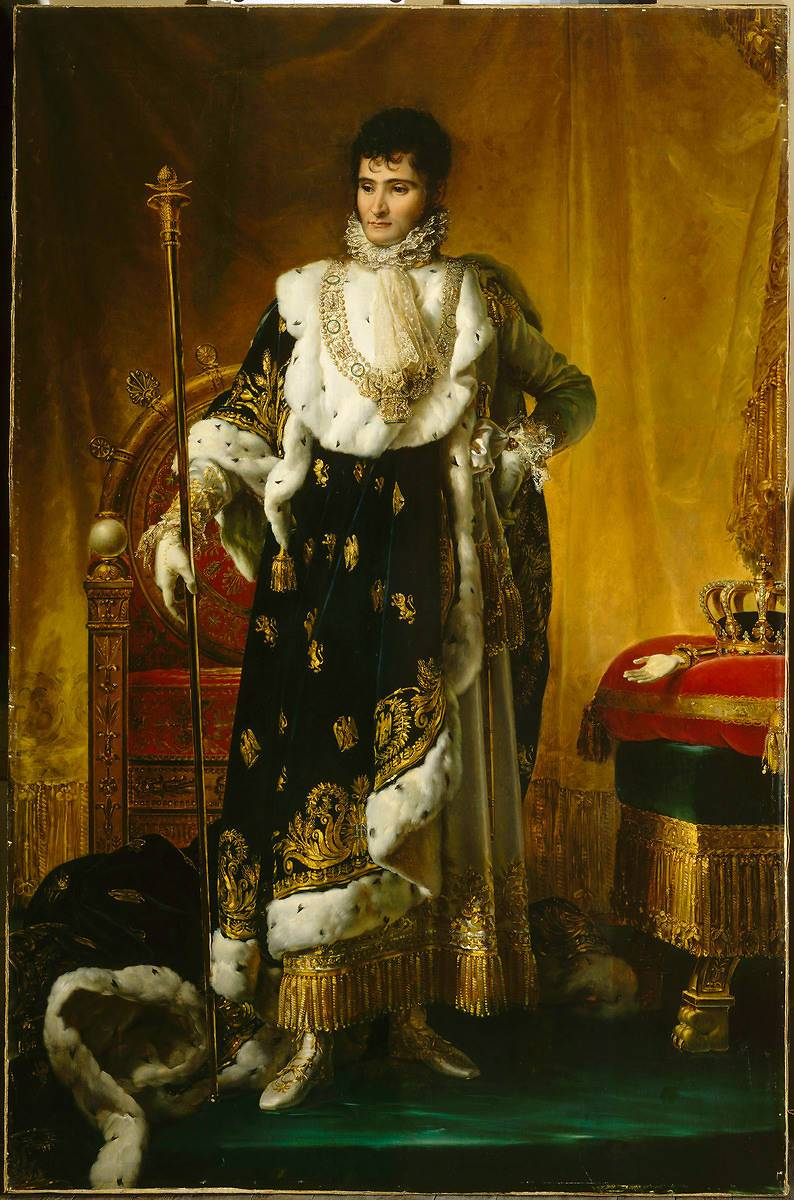
- Artist: François Gérard
- Year: 1811
- Type: Oil on canvas, portrait painting
- Dimensions: 218.5 cm × 143.5 cm (86.0 in × 56.5 in)
- Location: Palace of Fontainebleau, Fontainebleau

Portrait of Jérôme Bonaparte is an 1811 portrait painting by the French artist François Gérard depicting Jérôme Bonaparte, then the King of Westphalia. The younger brother of Napoleon, Emperor of France, he had been placed on the throne of the newly-created Kingdom in 1807 and held it until it was dissolved following the Battle of Leipzig in 1813. He is presented in coronation robes. The same year Gérard helped secure a commission for the young artist Horace Vernet to paint an equestrian portrait of Jérôme.

The painting is held in the collection of the Palace of Fontainebleau, outside Paris.

== See also ==
- Portrait of Joseph Bonaparte, an 1808 portrait by Gérard featuring Jérôme's elder brother

== Bibliography ==
- Dion-Tenenbaum, Anne. L'orfèvre de Napoléon: Martin-Guillaume Biennais. ISBN 2711845869. Réunion des musées nationaux, 2003.
- Harkett, Daniel & Hornstein, Katie (ed.) Horace Vernet and the Thresholds of Nineteenth-Century Visual Culture. ISBN 1512600431. Dartmouth College Press, 2017.
- Tulard, Jean. L'histoire de Napoléon par la peinture. ISBN 2841877396. Archipel, 2005.
