= Napoleon I as Emperor =

Painting by François Gérard

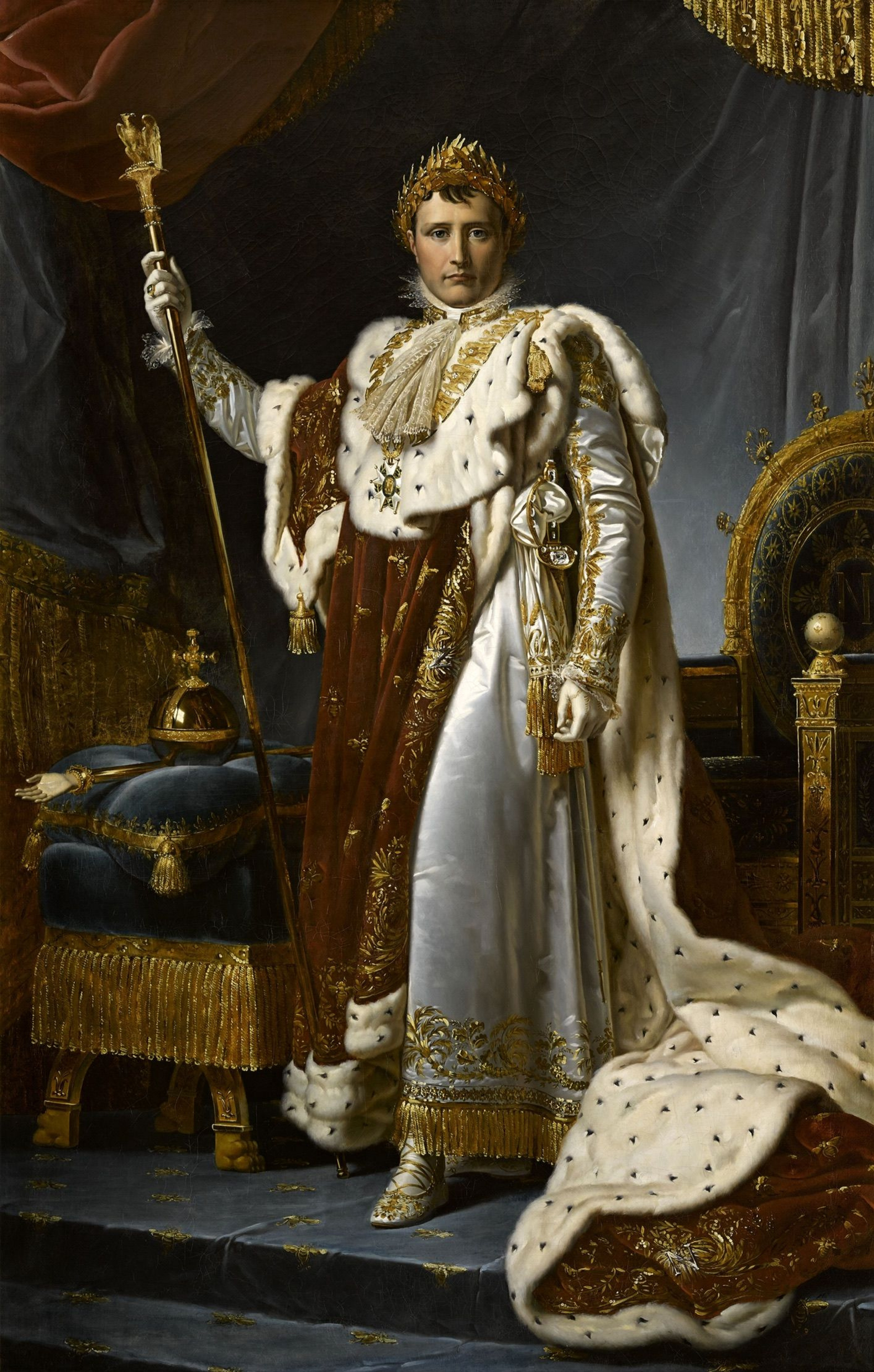
- Artist: François Gérard
- Year: 1805
- Medium: oil on canvas
- Dimensions: 225.5 cm × 145.5 cm (88.8 in × 57.3 in)
- Location: Palace of Versailles; Versailles

Napoleon I as Emperor, also known as Napoleon I in his Coronation Robes (French: Portrait de l’empereur Napoléon Ier en robe de sacre), is an oil-on-canvas painting by the French artist François Gérard, produced in 1805 under the First French Empire and currently displayed at the Palace of Versailles. Gérard initially produced the painting as an official portrait of Napoleon I for his throne room at the Tuileries Palace. It was later moved to the Palace of Versailles. The painting spent time at the Louvre, at the Élysée Palace (from 1849 to 1851 under the presidency of Louis-Napoléon Bonaparte), then at the Château de Saint-Cloud before returning to Versailles in 1894.

== Description ==
The painting depicts the emperor Napoleon I at his coronation on 2 December 1804. He is standing before a blue-cushioned gilt throne, wearing a white robe embroidered with gold thread, a long red coronation cloak trimmed with ermine, and white coronation gloves. His head is crowned with golden laurels, and he is wearing a golden collar of the Légion d'honneur. He is holding a staff topped by an eagle in his right hand, and his left hand is resting by his side; further to his right is a stool bearing an orb and cross and an ivory-headed sceptre, a Hand of Justice typical of the French Crown Jewels.

The work measures 225.5 cm × 145.5 cm (88.8 in × 57.3 in) – with its frame, 261.5 cm × 180.5 cm × 17.5 cm (103.0 in × 71.1 in × 6.9 in) – and weighs 100 kg (220 lb). Many copies were produced during the First French Empire. There are workshop paintings at, for example, the Château de Fontainebleau in Fontainebleau, the Hôtel des Invalides in Paris, the Rijksmuseum in Amsterdam (on loan from the Museum Boijmans Van Beuningen since 1922), the Pushkin Museum in Moscow, the Hofburg in Vienna, and the Deutsches Historisches Museum in Berlin.

== Capodimonte Museum ==
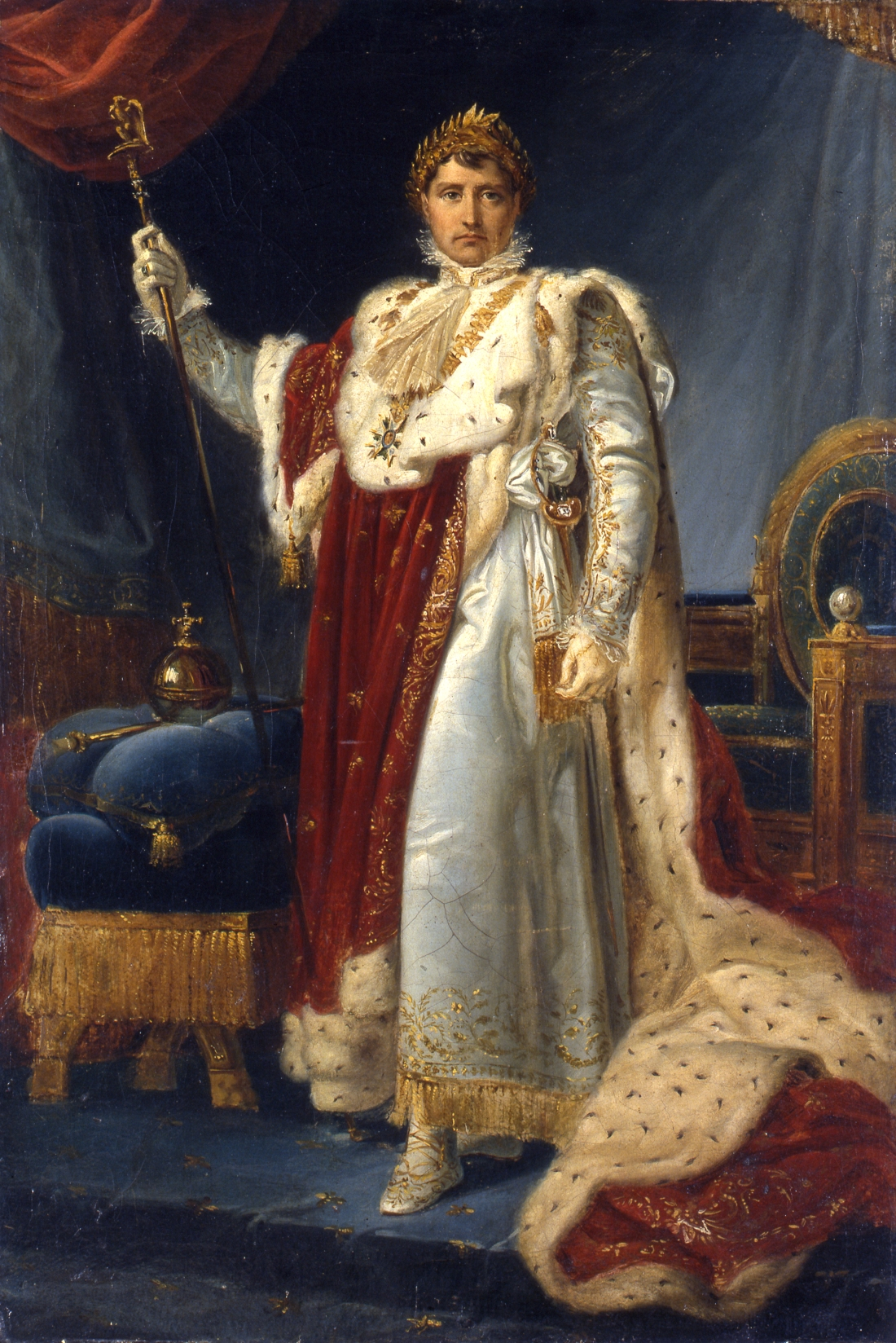
Copy at the Capodimonte Museum

A copy is now in the Capodimonte Museum in Naples, probably after being taken there by Joachim Murat, although it is not known where it was first exhibited. When the Bourbons were restored to the throne of Naples, the painting was initially moved off public display and into a barn at the Palace of Portici. The work was attributed to Gérard in the 1840s and the work was moved to the main floor of the palace. In an 1874 inventory, the work was reattributed to Anne-Louis Girodet de Roussy-Trioson and moved to the Palace of Capodimonte, where it still hangs in Room 54 within the Royal Apartments.

Despite being a copy, the work has several notable differences to the original. In the copy, the figure's pose is modelled on that of Michaelangelo's David, standing with the sceptre of Charles V of France in one hand and a gold laurel wreath on his head. To his left is a cushion bearing the hand of justice and an orb, whilst there is a throne in the background. The work's celebratory tone is reinforced by a French-made frame surmounted by emblems of Napoleon.

== Gallery of contemporaneous copies ==
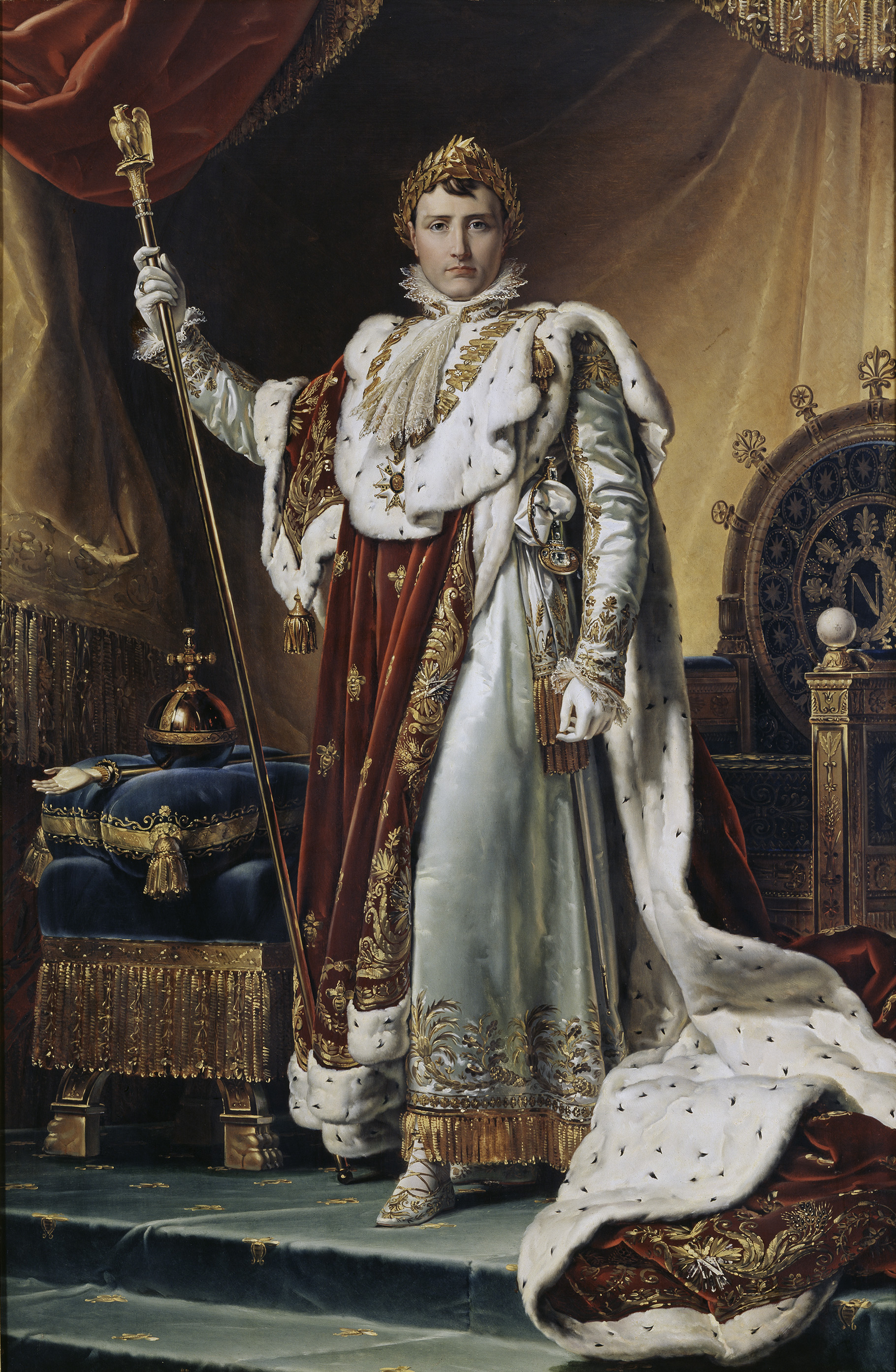
Château de Fontainebleau

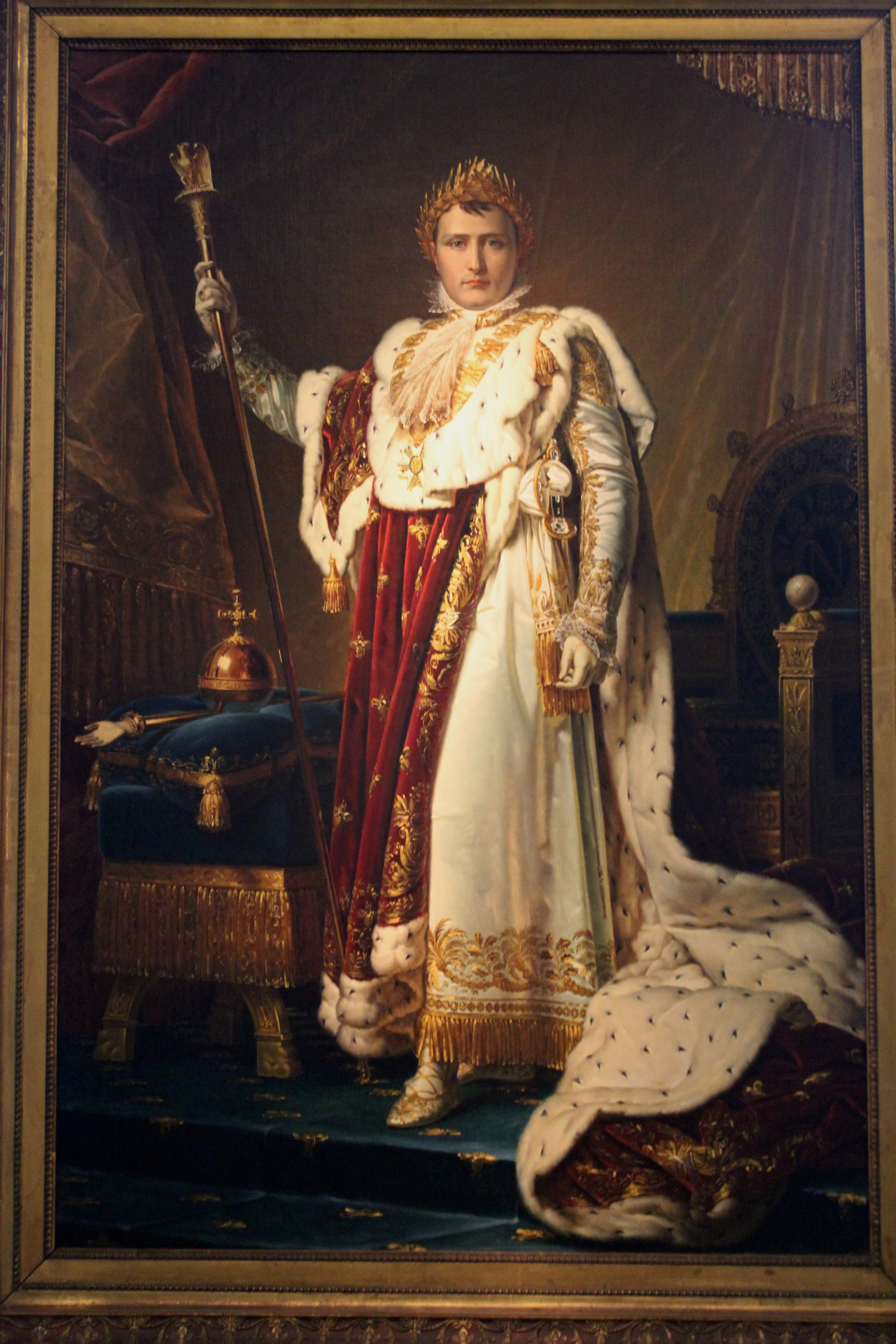
Deutsches Historisches Museum, Berlin

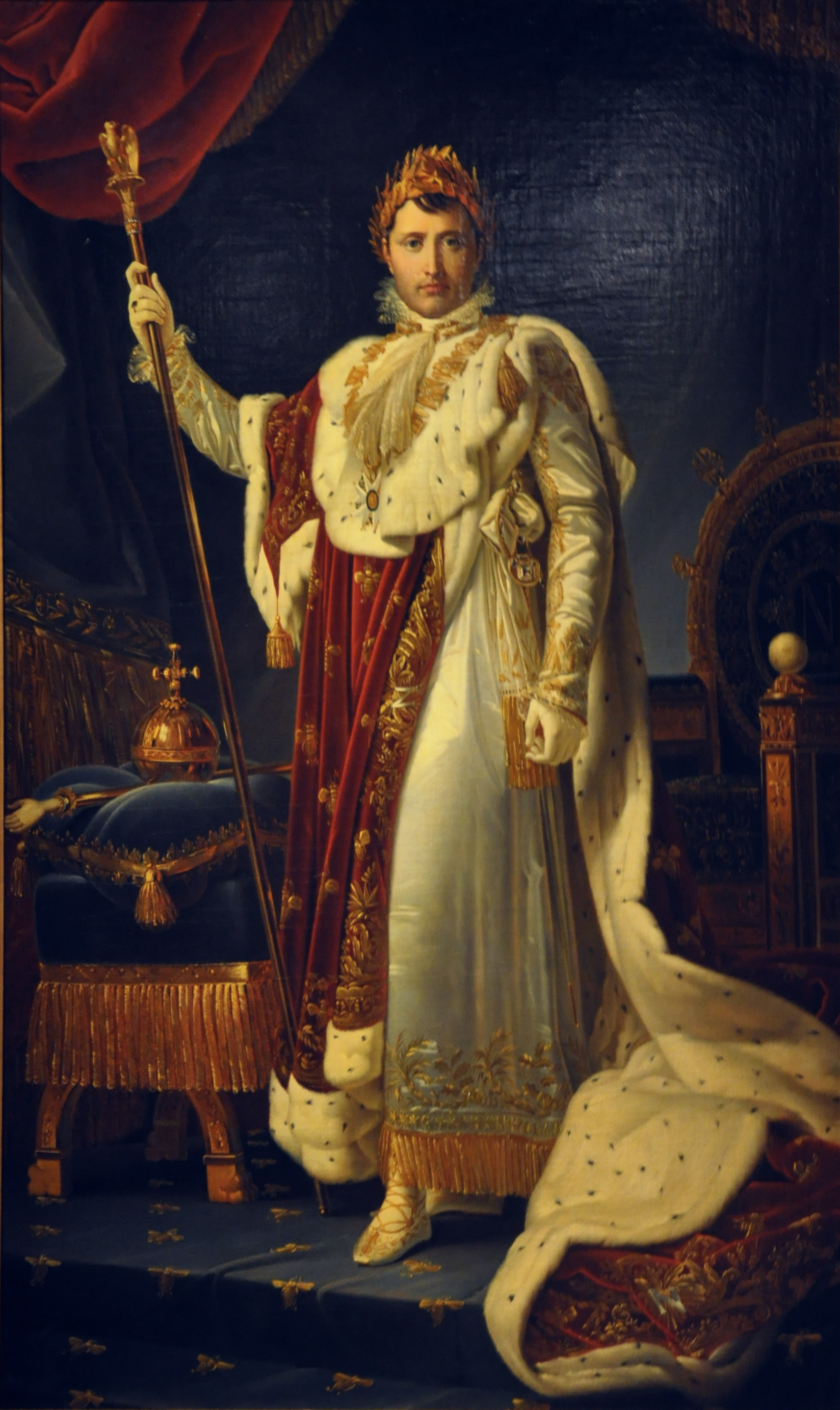
Hofburg, Vienna

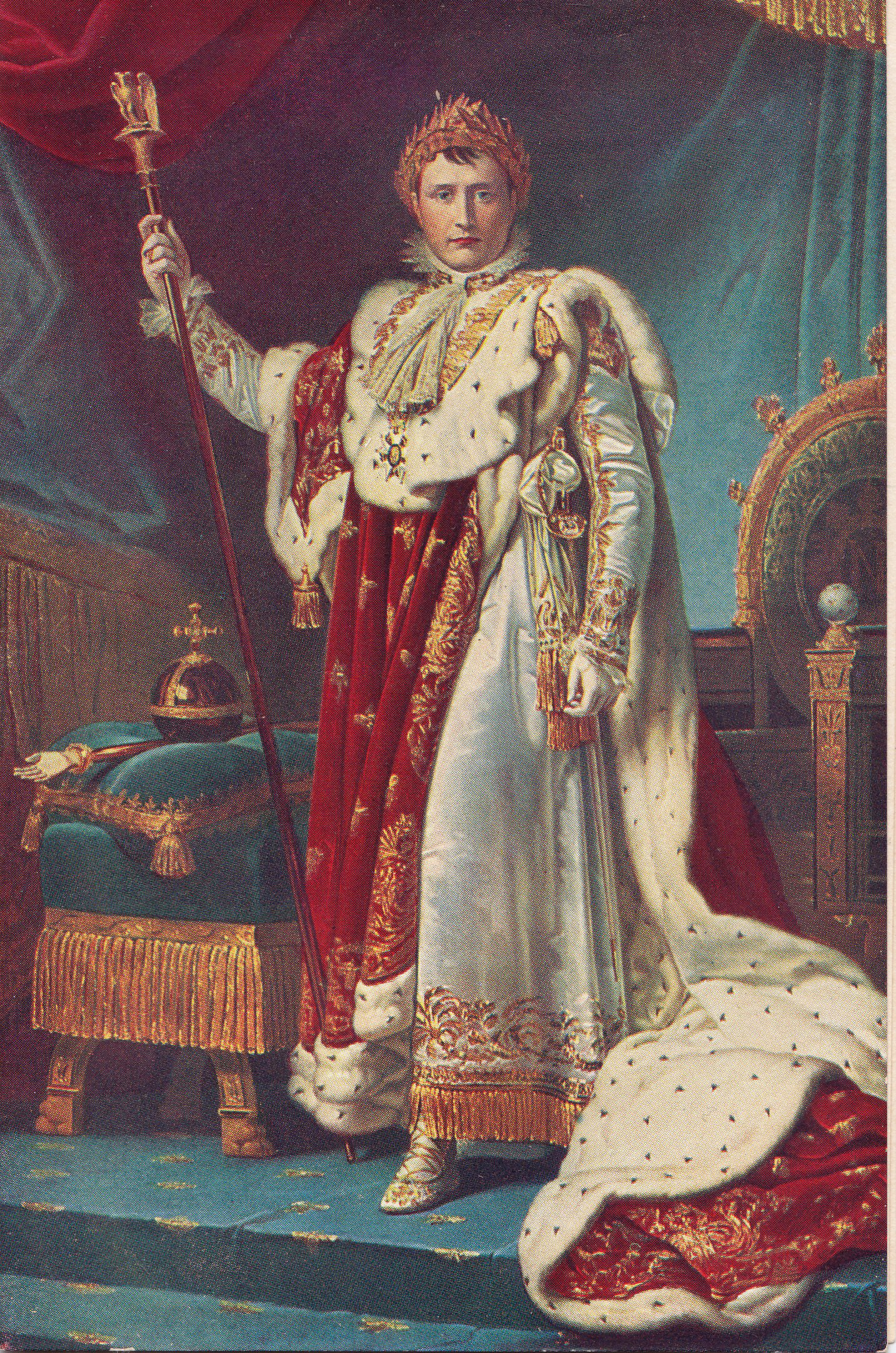
Hôtel des Invalides, Paris

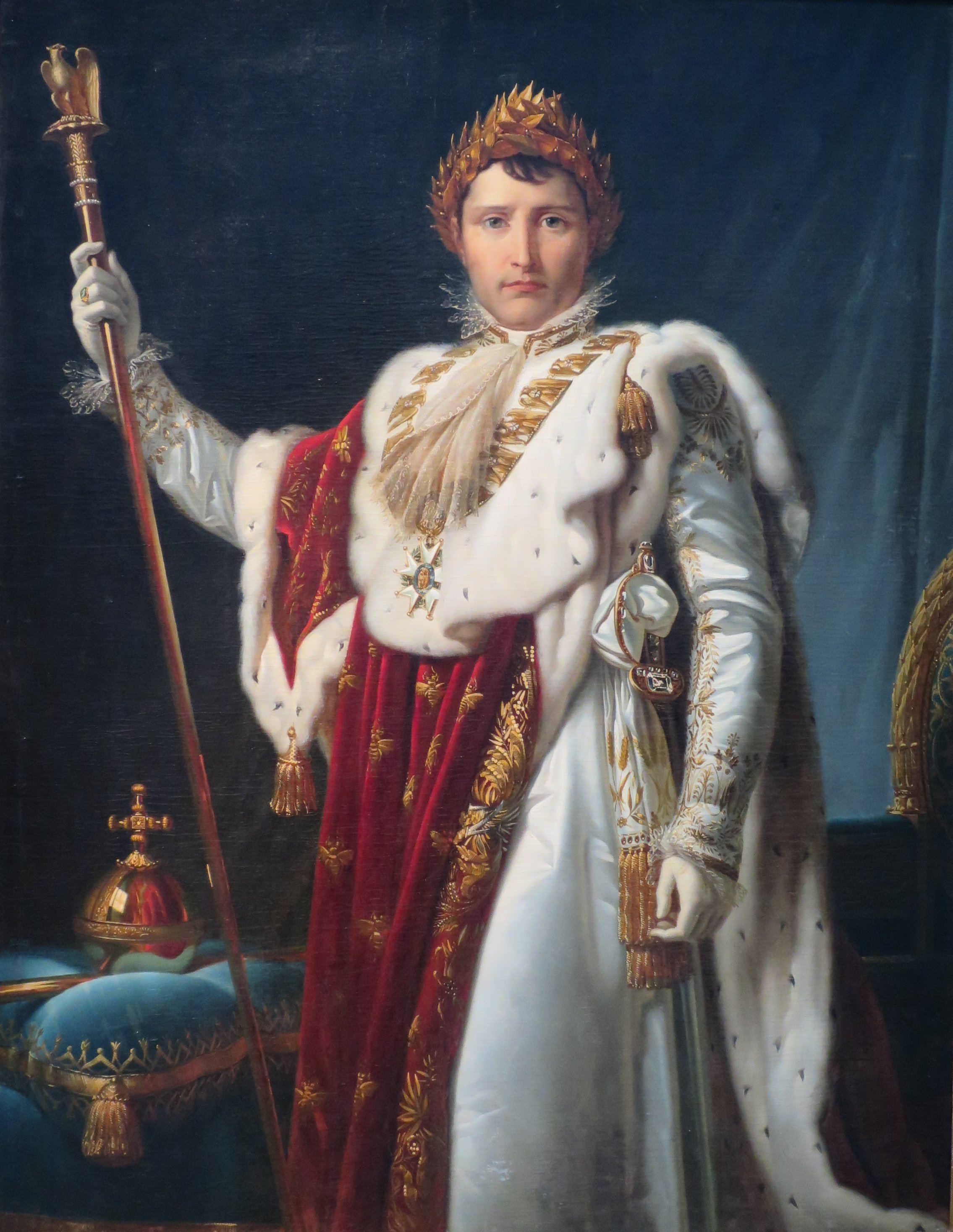
Pushkin Museum, Moscow

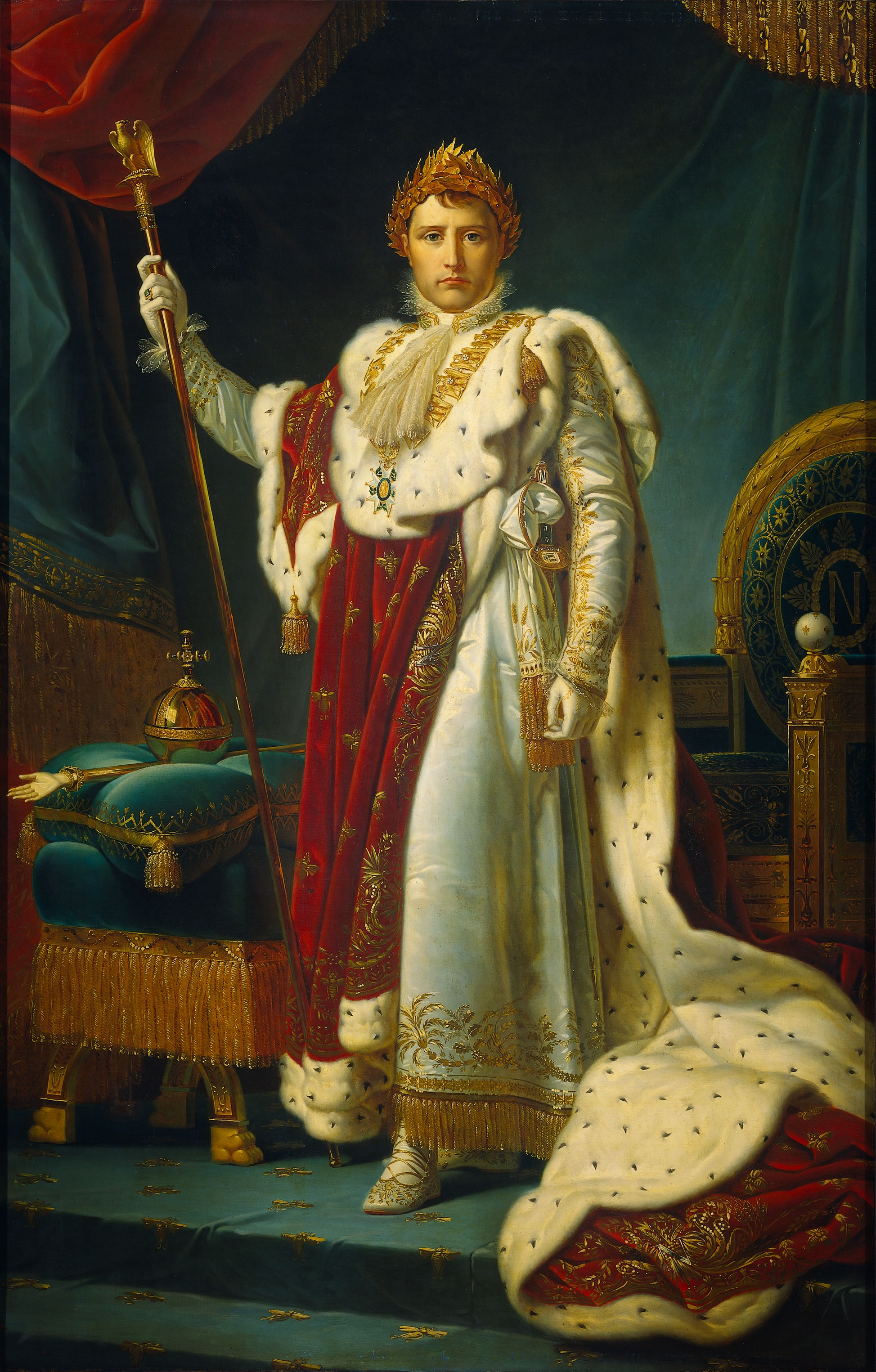
Rijksmuseum, Amsterdam

== See also ==
- The Coronation of Napoleon by Jacques-Louis David

== Bibliography ==
- (in Italian) Touring Club Italiano, Museo di Capodimonte, Milan, Touring Club Editore, 2012. ISBN 978-88-365-2577-5
- Original painting at Versailles
- Copy at the Rijksmuseum
