= Portrait of Margaret Desenfans =

1757 painting by Joshua Reynolds

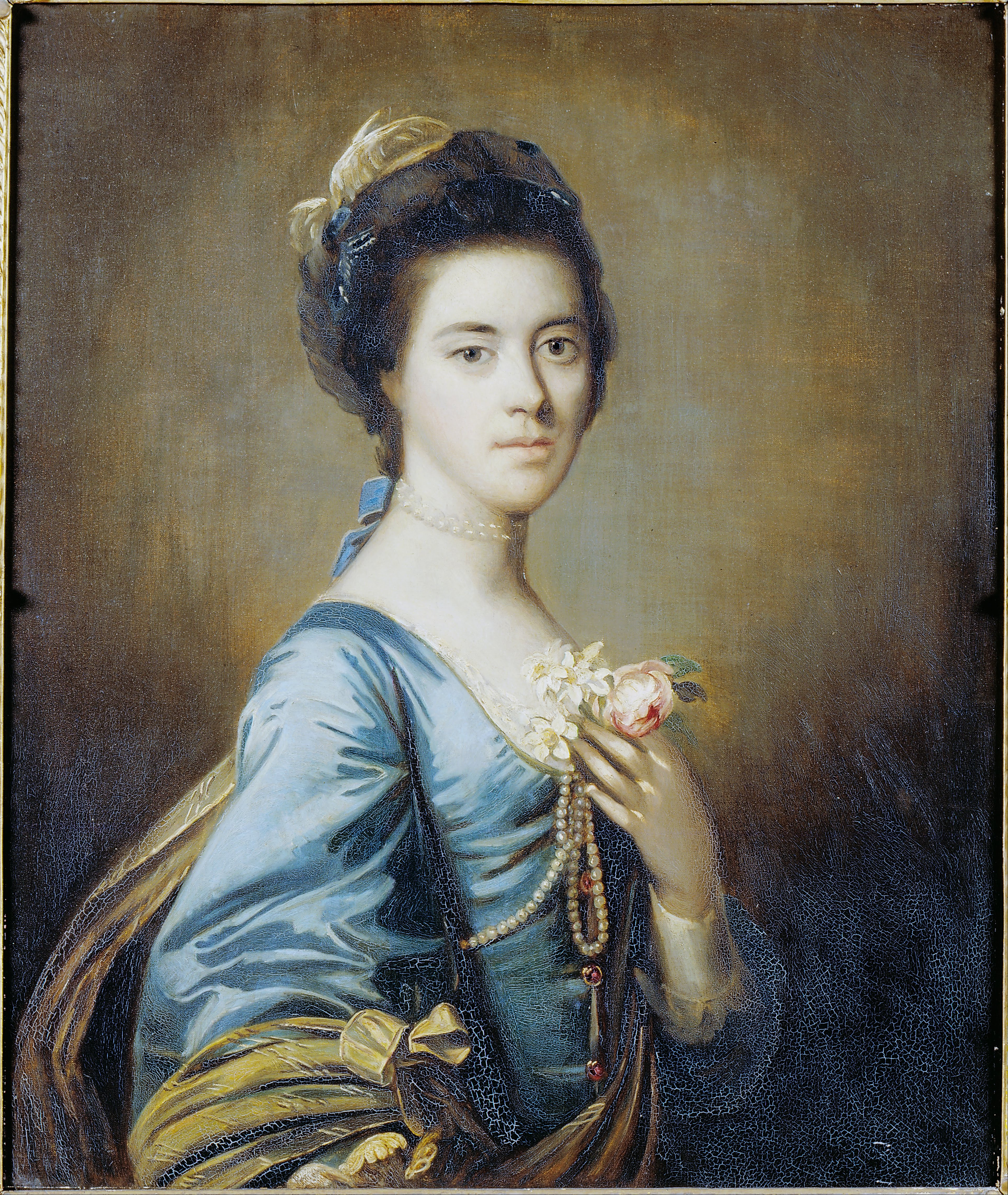
Moussa Ayoub's copy of the original portrait.

Portrait of Margaret Desenfans is a 1757 portrait of Margaret Desenfans by the English painter Joshua Reynolds. It was listed as part of her husband Noel's art collection in 1791 but remained in her own family's collection until being sold by auction in 1930 That year Dulwich College commissioned Moussa Ayoub to produce a copy of the original portrait. The original then remained lost until 2013, when its private owner loaned it for an anniversary exhibition at the Dulwich Picture Gallery, which Margaret and her husband founded.
