= Margaret Desenfans =

Co-founder of Dulwich Picture Gallery

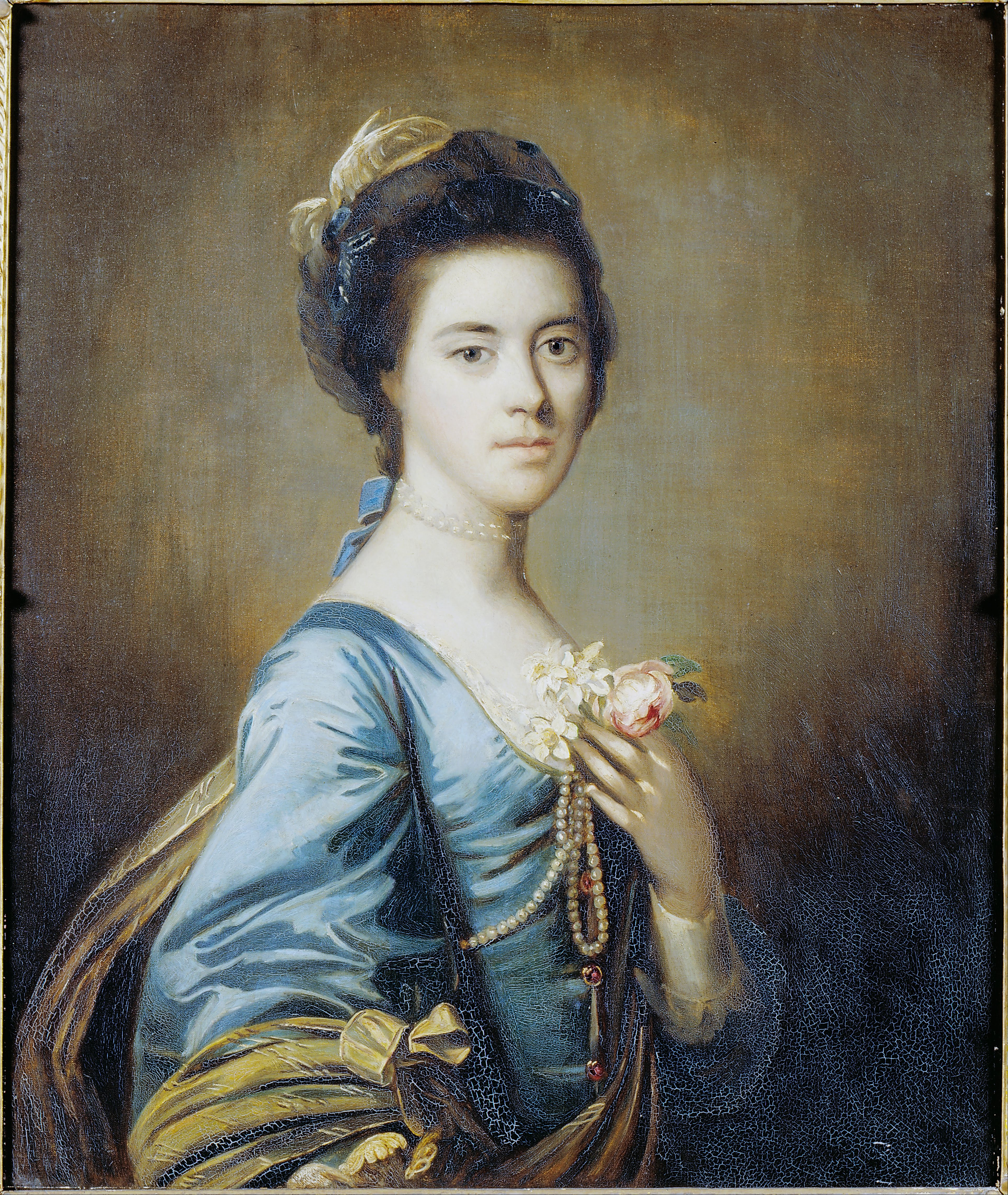
Portrait of Margaret Desenfans by Moussa Ayoub after Joshua Reynolds

Margaret Desenfans (née Morris, 1737–1814 or 1731–1814) was a British benefactor as one of three founders of the Dulwich Picture Gallery in London.

== Biography ==
Desenfans was born in Clasemont, Swansea, County Glamorgan, Wales. She was the daughter of Robert Morris (d.1768) and Margaret Morris (née Jenkins). Her father was a Shropshire entrepreneur who had come to Swansea in 1724 to supervise the Llangyfelach Copper Works, founded in 1717, and had taken control of the works when the owner John Lane was declared bankrupt in 1726. Her siblings included: Robert Morris (a barrister born c. 1743, a supporter of the radical politician, John Wilkes, who died unmarried c. 1797), Bridget, Jane Morris and Sir John Morris, 1st Baronet. John followed their father as an industrialist, active in copper-smelting and coal-mining in Swansea, South Wales. Morriston, in the Tawe valley, is named after her family.

In 1757, aged 20, Desenfans was painted by Sir Joshua Reynolds. A copy of this Portrait of Margaret Desenfans was commissioned by Dulwich College in 1930 and executed by Moussa Ayoub.

In 1776, Desenfans married the art collector and dealer Noel Desenfans. She, her French husband, and their friend Francis Bourgeois would eventually build up an art collection which became the basis of Dulwich Picture Gallery in London.

Desenfans died on 16 May 1813 at her home in London.

== Legacy ==
In 2013, Desenfans was commemorated by a display at Dulwich Picture Gallery.

== See also ==
- Morris baronets
