= Sir John Morris, 1st Baronet =

British industrialist

Sir John Morris, 1st Baronet (15 July 1745 – 25 June 1819), was a British industrialist, active in copper-smelting and coal-mining in Swansea, South Wales.

== Biography ==
=== Early life ===
John Morris was born on 15 July 1745. He was the son of Robert Morris (died 1768) and Margaret Morris (née Jenkins) who in later life lived in Tredegar. Robert was a Shropshire entrepreneur who had come to Swansea in 1724 to supervise the Llangyfelach Copper Works, founded in 1717, and had taken control of the works when the owner, John Lane, was declared bankrupt in 1726. John Morris had four older siblings: Robert (a barrister born c. 1743, a supporter of the radical politician, John Wilkes, who died unmarried c. 1797), Bridget, Jane and Margaret, who as Margaret Desenfans became one of the co-founders of the Dulwich Picture Gallery

=== Morriston ===
The family expanded their copper-smelting and coal-mining interests in the Tawe valley throughout the remainder of the eighteenth century. John Morris initiated in 1768 the building of the planned village of Morris Town (today the northern part of Swansea, Morriston), including 'Morris Castle', to house the company's workers. With a growing population by the 19th century, tin-plating became a major industry.

He was High Sheriff of Glamorgan in 1803 and in 1806 he was created a baronet, of Clasemont in the County of Glamorgan. Clasemont was their home in the Clase or Clâs part of Morriston which had been taken down before 1849 when the locality was summarised by topographer Samuel Lewis.

=== Family ===
His father died in 1768.

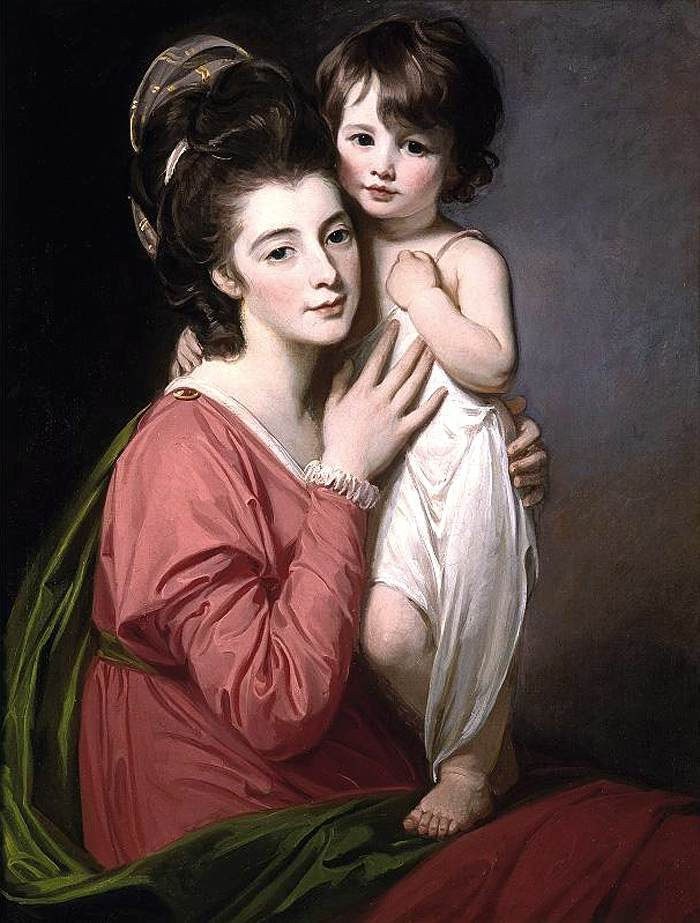
Mrs Henrietta Morris and her son John. Portrait by George Romney, 1777.

In 1774 John married Henrietta Musgrave, one of five daughters of Sir Philip Musgrave, 6th Baronet.

In 1776 his sister Margaret Morris married the Frenchman, Noel Joseph Desenfans; they and Francis Bourgeois would eventually build up an art collection which became the basis of the collection at Dulwich Picture Gallery in London.

Morris had five daughters, three of whom survived into adulthood and each married:

- Henrietta ∞ Sir Nathaniel Levett Peacocke.
- Caroline ∞ Rev. George Fauquier
- Matilda ∞ Mr. Edward Jesse. Their children included historian John Heneage Jesse and author and activist Matilda Charlotte Houstoun.

His younger son gained an M.A. but is not recorded by Burke's Peerage as having had any children. His older son married the daughter of the 5th Lord Torrington and continued the male line - he had a Navy Commander and General among the less senior of his four sons and the title devolved from one branch to another to a Morris descendant of the Commander living in Georgetown, Ontario.

He died on 25 June 1819, aged 73.

== Arms ==
Coat of arms of Sir John Morris, 1st Baronet
Crest A lion rampant Or charged on the shoulder with a cross couped Gules within a chain in the form of an arch Or. Escutcheon Sable on a saltire engrailed Ermine a bezant charged with a cross couped Gules. Motto Scuto Fidei (By The Shield of Faith)

Baronetage of the United Kingdom
New creation	Baronet (of Clasemont); 1806–1819	Succeeded by John Morris
