= Matilda Charlotte Houstoun =

English writer and women's right activist

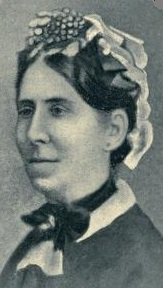
- Born: 16 August 1811; Staffordshire, England, United Kingdom
- Died: 1 June 1892 (aged 80); Pimlico, London, England
- Occupations: Travel writer; novelist; women's rights activist; biographer
- Writing career
- Notable works: Texas and the Gulf of Mexico; or Yachting in the New World, Hesperos or Travels in the West, Recommended to Mercy, Only a woman's life; by one who saved it
- Movements: Women's 19th century literature, Sentimental Fiction, Novel of Experience

Matilda Charlotte Houstoun (née Jesse; 16 August 1811 – June 1892) was an English travel writer, novelist, biographer, and women's right activist. She is best known for her series of travel writings, particularly Texas and the Gulf of Mexico (1844) and Hesperos, and their observations about African-American life during the times of the Confederate Deep South. Later on, she turned her pen from novels to social reform, particularly on the rights of working class women and single mothers. During her lifetime, her best known work was Recommended to Mercy, a female-driven "yellow-back" novel published in 1862.

== Childhood ==
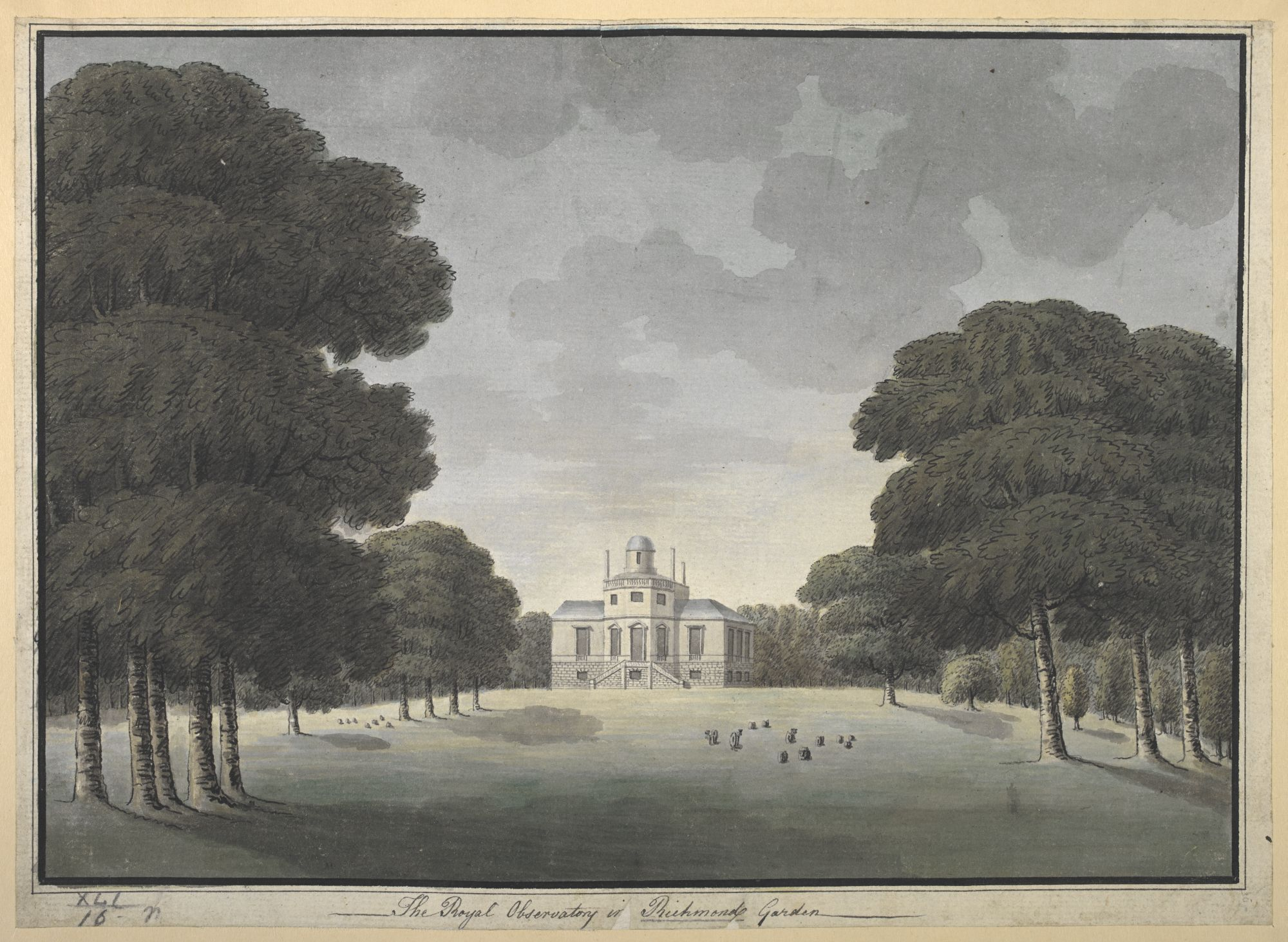
King's Observatory c. 1778 in Richmond Park

Matilda Charlotte Jesse was baptised into the Church of England at All Saints' parish church in West Bromwich, Staffordshire, 16 August 1811.

Her father, Edward Jesse (1780–1868), was a writer on natural history and the son of a Yorkshire vicar. His family had been Huguenots (French Protestants) who had moved to England following the 1685 revocation of the edict of Nantes. He was a friend of John Wilson Croker, Irish statesman and author, and Rev. John Mitford, editor of The Gentleman's Magazine. Jesse held various government appointments, including sinecure positions, and became Deputy Surveyor of Royal Parks and Palaces, in which role he helped restore Hampton Court Palace.

Her mother, Matilda née Morris, was the daughter of Sir John Morris, 1st Baronet of Glamorganshire, Wales.

Matilda had a brother, John Heneage Jesse, who grew up to be a historian, and a sister, later Mrs. Curwen. The family lived in or near the royal parks to the west of London, first at Richmond Park and then Bushy Park. Edward Jesse became well acquainted with the Duke of Clarence, later William IV, and as Matilda and her father rode around Richmond Park, the Duke would often join them. At one point the family lived in Molesey, Surrey.

She received a basic education, but her Welsh governess banned her charge from reading novels. However, she would often work on her father's rough drafts, becoming acquainted with numerous artists and writers of the day. She was familiar with the writings of Theodore Edward Hook and Thomas Moore from her father's social circle, and began to write short stories and poems.

The debate around the abolition of slavery across the British Empire was a burning political question in the early nineteenth century. Her aunt taught her about this cause as she grew up. The family was visited by William Wilberforce against whom she held a ‘childhood grudge’ because 'after the visit of the great emancipator, all cakes and puddings were strictly tabooed as they contained West India sugar, and therefore to eat them was a sin'.

== Early adulthood ==
Her first marriage was to Reverend Lionel Fraser circa 1831. He died the following year and she moved back to her parents' home, where she stayed for four years.

Her second marriage was on 1 October 1839 in the chapel of the British Embassy in Paris, to Captain William Houstoun of the 10th Royal Hussars cavalry regiment. Her husband's father was General Sir William Houston, 1st Baronet, sometime Governor of Gibraltar, and his mother was Lady Jane Maitland, the fourth daughter of James Maitland, 7th Earl of Lauderdale.

They had two sons, William who was born in 1838, George, who was born in 1841, and one daughter, Sidney, born in 1843.

In 1842–1844 she travelled with her husband to New Orleans and Texas, which was the source for her first travel writings; then they travelled in a Britzka carriage through Paris and Naples, returning to Texas in the 1850s. The family moved to Ireland when her husband acquired land in Doolough, County Mayo. Living in Dhulough Lodge, she began her career as a novelist, publishing her first novel in 1862. In her later years, she returned to live in London, and became interested in women's rights, particularly with issues surrounding single mothers and working-class women.

== North America ==
Departing September 1842 from England, she went with her husband, Captain William Houstoun, travelling on their 200-tonne yacht the Dolphin, fitted with six cannon, over to the United States of America where they landed in Galveston on 18 December, later arriving at New Orleans between December 1842 and January 1843, then sailing along onto the Gulf of Mexico, alternating between Texas and New Orleans during their stay.

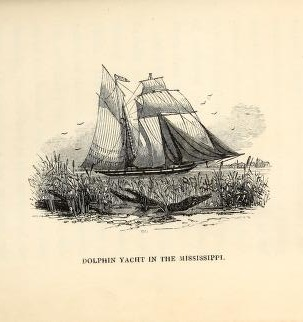
The Dolphin yacht

Upon one of these intervals, returning from New Orleans to Galveston, she took a trip on the 111-tonne steamboat Dayton to Houston Texas upon which she spent three days, travelling along the Buffalo Bayou. In 1844 she published this as her first travelogue Texas or the Gulf of Mexico; Yachting to the New World. This trip was taken for business ventures her husband was undertaking in beef manufacture and preservation at the time.

In her 1850 publication Hesperos she makes another trip to Texas, which at the time was in the process of the annexation of Texas to the United States. On the second trip to Texas she visited the home of James Morgan, a Texas slave-owner and land speculator, where she met Ferdinand von Roemer. The two did not agree, Roemor characterising her as a 'snob', Houstoun describing him as unfamiliar to a 'change in raiment' and 'having no teeth' due to a 'tobacco' smoking, which she thought of as a disgusting habit to practise. The second trip appeared to have been taken by Captain Houstoun to invest in Texan sugar plantations, however she only observed as a tourist to Texas life.

Viktor Bracht in 1848 noted her 1844 work to be the only other account of Texas written by a woman in this time, except the Texas 1833 - 1836 works by Mary Austin Holley, worth reading on the subject of Texas as a native to Texas. In Yachting to the New World, Houstoun notes upon politics and other topics like the advent of a civil war in the United States.

== Slavery and racism ==
To the residents of the British Isles, the slave trade was considered abolished in the British Empire in 1772, but slavery was not illegal until the parliamentary action of 1840, which was a long process notably involving the work of William Wilberforce (whose work she was acquainted with) and the James Somerset Case in 1772.

Abolitionist works (see Clapham sect or British and Foreign Anti-Slavery Society) and published authors like Ukawsaw Gronniosaw in his 1772 work A Narrative of the Most Remarkable Particulars in the Life of James Albert Ukawsaw Gronniosaw, an African Prince, Olaudah Equiano in his 1789 work The Interesting Narrative of the Life of Olaudah Equiano, Phillis Wheatley in her 1773 work Poems on Various Subjects, Religious and Moral, Mary Prince in her 1831 work The History of Mary Prince, and in the work of the Sons of Africa (widespread literature publications in London society at the time, each often going through multiple reprints) shaped how in 19th century Britain's societal views on the practice of slavery. Expansion of this was seen as a moral Christian duty to "brothers" in need and certainly appears to have been the mindset upon which Houstoun went to the United States with her aunt Mrs. Townsend:

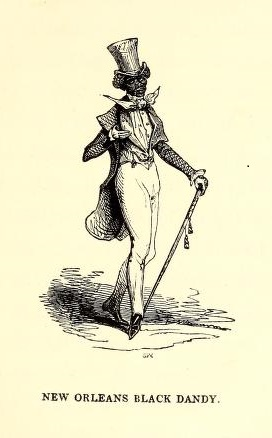
New Orleans Black Dandy from Texas and the Gulf of Mexico 1844

There is scarcely any spectacle more affecting in idea than that of a human being being made a matter of barter. I went to America strongly prejudiced against this unnatural traffic, and prepared to view every instance of it with horror, and every slave with compassion and sympathy.

Particularly surrounding the culture of the black population in New Orleans, she at first believed them to be something akin to passive agents, but over her 1844 work comes to form a more intersectional view of the New Orleanians in the period, regarding them as active agents in their own affairs:

During our drives through the streets especially on Sundays, the display of Negro finery, and taste was very remarkable. ... No one pays higher for his outfit than the negro in the Slave States. He gives his money too, so carelessly, and with such an independent air. I have heard of their giving eight dollars for a suit of clothes, and their industry, and efforts to procure money, are highly praiseworthy. They are in the habit of giving their masters a certain sum of money, (generally I believe about two dollars a day) in lieu of their services. Their time then, is their own, and they are at liberty to make as much more out of it as they can. … though still regarding the slave trade generally in the same light, I began to think that the slaves were not quite so to be pitied as I had imagined.

In Hesperos, Houstoun's 1850 publication, she touches on a number of topics including Christianity amongst African-Americans, the settlements of Liberia (which she describes as "the wilderness"), the population figures in the Americas comparing "whites" and "blacks", the effects of slavery on wealth distribution on the upper classes amongst the northern states, black labour in the West Indies, redistribution of global slave routes, education among the southern African-American population, and England's role in the cotton trade, abolition, and "prevention of the slave trade".

All of this is measured by her own "social scale," which is evocative of the later The White Man's Burden race-based ideology. Her own intersectionality displays how she thought of the "blacks" as a group to be "pitied" and, particularly Africans who without "the light of civilization" and the "[Americans'] exertion throughout the means of missionaries to propagate the gospel and civilise the nations on the African coast ... [and] a perpetual stream of industrious and intelligent men [who] will be pouring in from the United States" would "retrograde":

“May we not, with these facts before us, come to the conclusion that the bondage of the black race in America is a medium [for the Christian god] through which it is probable that the heathen portion of benighted Africa may in time be civilized.”

== Ireland ==
Her second husband leased land in North western Ireland however he died on 23 Oct 1872 in Dhulough Lodge Ireland. She published her 1879 work based on living in Ireland in Doolough, at ‘Dhulough Lodge’. It was at Doolough she wrote a great many of her early works. She often wrote as a way to deal with her 'weariness' over the extended periods of time William Houstoun was away on active duty, and then as a widow. Her works were usually ‘sensation fiction’ from this period.

She became interested in landscape gardening during her time at Connaught turning the Lodge from ‘a bog’ to ‘dainty and well kept gardens’:

"I am sure I was born to be a landscape gardener," remarks Mrs. Houstoun. "That was my real vocation in life. ... Towering above and beyond our roughly-built house was a mountain called Glenumra, over 3,000 feet in height, whilst in front was Muelhrae, or King of the Irish Mountains (as it is the loftiest), and a part of it effectually concealed from us all the glories of the setting sun. The humid nature of the soil was favourable to the growth of plants. I designed and laid out large gardens, and had only to insert a few feet or inches, as the case might be, of laurel, fuchsia, veronica, or hydrangia into the ground, and the slips took root, grew and flourished. Long before we left there were fuchsias thirty feet high; the veronicas, over six feet, blossomed in November. Then I built a stove-house and conservatory, where my exotic fernery was my great delight, and I spent much of my time there. All the money I earned by my writings I spent on my ferns and plants."

== Writing ==
Houston's earliest published work is Katerina, which was published in Bentley's Miscellany, Richard Bentley's London-based magazine in 1839.

=== Travelogues ===
Houstoun published her works Texas and the Gulf of Mexico; Yachting in the New World in 1844 and Hesperos or Travels in the New World in 1850.

=== Novels ===
Her novel Recommended to Mercy (1862), was a precursor to a number of her other fiction works, a large number of which includes stories surrounding female leads or heroines who are often involved in dangerous scenarios and settings which explore the fallen woman protagonist where each is proactive in Houstoun's novels. These have been described as 'sentimental' works of fiction, which in the 19th century were known for being dissuaded to be read by male authors, known as ‘silly novels by woman novelists’.

By 1868 she was regarded as being in 'high note in literature as a novelist and writer'. Her later works (1879–1892) are said to be characterised by challenging the 'institution of marriage' before the New Woman genre grew in popularity in Britain.

Sentimental Novel	Publication
Such Things Are	1862
Taken upon Trust	1863
Cyril Blount: or, Trust Money	1865
The Two Rubies	1868
Wide of the Mark	1871
Gone Like a Shadow	1871
Lilian's Penance	1872
Barbara's warning	1874
Done in the dark	1877
Records of a Stormy Life	1879
Lost in the Crowd	1882
A cruel wrong	1890

==== Such Things Are ====
Beginning in Wales, Such Things Are is Houstoun's first sentimental fiction work. Beginning with 'George Bernard', who falls in love after saving his love interest 'Olive', they marry, moving to London together. The story then shifts to the Brigham family, whose father has recently become bankrupt. The eldest, Susan Brigham, moves to be with her wealthy godmother Christina Llewellen and her niece, Margaret Mayford, in the countryside. The Brighams and the Bernards move to the Isle of Wight, then London, whereupon all the characters begun to alternate. The story branches into a number of interwoven subplots regarding debts, gambling, and murder with a number of other characters. The work ends by Christina Llewellen marrying, Margaret Mayfords suitor (Lord George) ending his engagement with her, and a murder subplot, where Susan Brigham's cousin Florence eventually runs away to Malta with her husband.

==== Recommended to Mercy ====
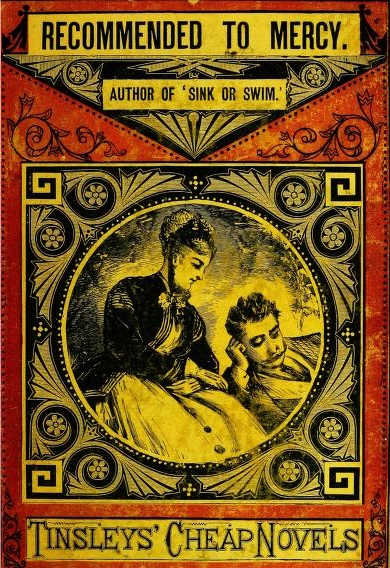
Recommended to Mercy 1869

Recommended to Mercy was at the time of its publication said to be possibly banned by Mudie's publishing group. In the end, William Harrison Ainsworth had to recommend that Mercy had to be self published by Houstoun, being picked up after its fourth edition and success in papers like The Times, by Tinsley publishers for its two shilling yellowback series in 1869.

Mercy's protagonist is Helen Langton or Vaughan, a fallen woman. Mercy includes common sentimental novel tropes (like bigamy trials or marriage infidelity) but due to Houstoun's writing of Helen's actions as an ‘experienced heroine’ (the fallen woman trope subverted and re-examined), Mercy has been reclassified by modern scholars as a ‘novel of experience’.

Helen sets an example for a ‘more radically... wifely loyalty without the legitimisation of a marriage contract.’ Throughout Mercy are example of loveless marriages which are played in opposition to Helens societally unconventional relationship to her lover, Philip Thornleigh. Helen subverts the audience's expectations by choosing to be a mistress rather than be married unhappily to a stranger, condemning such marriages as ‘errors [for which] she saw no excuse’. Helen therefore ‘disregards the social and legal absolutes’ of Victorian societal expectation to instead ‘privately carry out [her] ideals’ she holds for her own happiness. Houstoun also extended these principles to Helen's happiness in her work, and in Helen's belief in work for post-maternal mothers.

Houstoun lays some blame for perpetuating these societal expectations with women themselves. Characters such as Mrs. Wraxham attempts to socially ostracize Helen for her own financial incentive for example. Helen is written as an example of Houstouns proto-feminist relationship dynamics wherein she is generous and charitable to other women, promoting ‘the importance of women's relationships to social harmony’ in the favour of other women's agency which Houstoun prompts the reader to follow by example.

The narrator uses a number of these polemics to denounce and examine a number of the supposed judgements the audience would make of the fallen woman trope, so that the reader becomes empathic to Helen, leading the reader to question the value systems which otherwise prevent Helen from thus becoming an accepted member of society.

Houstoun ends the novel when Helen is ‘middle-aged’ and ‘resigned to her status’ which is said to be a precursor to the New Woman genre for its ending of ‘uneasy alliance’ of work and Helen's ‘radical’ personal moral and ethics.

==== Taken upon Trust ====
Taken upon Trust is the sequel to Such Things Are. The plot revolves around Chrissy, who is accused of poisoning someone who is after her affection, this admirer is the friend of Chrissy's husband.

==== Zoe's Brand ====
Zoe's Brand is an escapist fantasy sentimental novel. The female protagonist, Zoe "Cherie" Gordon is the daughter of a Louisiana plantation owner, with numerous Prince Charming-type love interests. Male characters are notable for being viewed through the female gaze of Zoe, rarely developing as characters beyond their gentlemanly behaviour.

With the Antebellum South as a backdrop, Zoe's was written based on Houstoun's time in Texas in 1843, written with strong tones of anti-slavery, and pious Christianity seen in Mercy. Although never translated, her work was sought after by the editor of the Revue Contemporaine to be published in French.

==== Cyril Blount ====
Cyril Blount was a sentimental novel Houstoun had written in response to the bankruptcy and settlement acts by Richard Bethell, whereby 1864 a large number of 'gentlemen' had become declared bankruptcy on a change in the law in 1861 which became the Land Registry Act 1862. The novel's protagonist Cyril, is acquainted with a woman, Maudie. She is to marry Captain Henslow, who has married into the same family twice, but Maudie does not wish to marry Henslow. Maudie's mother however has approved of the arrangement. The plot is said to be 'highly flavoured with rascality', including a 'murder plot' and inheritance themes.

==== The Two Rubies ====
The story revolves around the marriage of two women who are both named Ruby, whom a reviewer describes as 'above the average of young lady heroines'. 'Mrs. Raynor' is also noted to 'write a memorandum on some letter which had come into her possession by mistake [whereby] she describes herself as a Christian gentleman'.

==== Wide of the Mark ====
A man murders the lover of his sister and locks her away in a tower. The themes of the work heavily involving 'insanity' and 'marital cruelty'.

==== Gone Like a Shadow ====
Gone Like a Shadow's heroine is Madeline Ward. Madeline's father's dies and this causes her to leave her home in the country. On her friend's advice, she takes the pseudonym of Ada Wynward, becoming a governess with a family in London. Madeline's mother becomes ill, at which point she becomes the governess for a family in the county of 'Meadshire'. Madeline is treated very well by the new family, however she is blighted by imposter syndrome and becomes worried for her future career prospects. To provide for her mother, she steals a 'small chain' and ends up having to bribe the pawnsbroker to redeem her for the stolen 'jewel'. She becomes more reclusive over the course of the plot due to this incident. 9 months after this incident, Madeline marries Baronet Deane, who eventually finds out about her murky past due to gossip in Meadshire by a 'vulgar ...dragoon', losing her face in polite Meadshire society. On her cousin's advice Madeline flees to London, where she then 'furnishes conclusive evidence of an alibi' to attempt to separate from her husband, to regain standing once more in Meadshire. Sending this alibi as blackmail to the Baronet, he rebuffs her and she is met with a 'stony response' from the baronet. Madeline, now a mother, becomes a fallen woman with Houstoun ending the last volume on the cliffhanger that 'though "gone like a shadow" from the busy world, [she] shall return'.

==== Lilians Penance ====
Lilian's Penance is based around a heroine who marries a man whilst she is in love with someone else.

==== Barbara's Warning ====
Houstoun set this work amongst the demimonde.

==== Fixed as Fate ====
The novel is based around the marriage of the protagonist Ethel Bassett to General Philip Meredyth, who was originally married to Ethel's sister. Ethel is in need of money, but is stuck between her desire of marrying for love than for money. Whilst Ethel is in Europe, she is telegraphed by Meredyth about a change in the law regarding their situation. This novel is about the implications of such a 'social imbroglio' of a marriage.

=== Women's rights ===
Houstoun became a champion of women's rights and began publishing her works based on these as her Only a woman's life; by one who saved it (1889) His Besetting Sin (1888) and later works are said to champion these interests.

=== Biographies ===
Her 1879 work, Records of a Stormy Life and 1883 work A Woman's memories of World-Known men; being semi-autobiographies; are based upon the events of her own life. Sylvanus Redivivus (1889) also being another of her biographies.

== Activism ==
Houstoun became more involved in her later life as a social reformer in women's welfare and rights. Specifically, the most notable being the case of Frances Isabella Stallard (1856–1922), whose case Houstoun became involved with on Houstoun's insistence that Stallard was ‘an innocent woman... condemned to death on circumstantial evidence for the murder of her child’.

As a teenager, Frances had met a man called George Gatrell, a shipwright, in Cowes on the Isle of Wight, she became pregnant by this man, who fled to the West Indies. She gave birth to this child as an impoverished single mother out of wedlock, between January and March in 1875 at the Parkhurst workhouse and named her daughter Agnes Ellen Stallard. In the summer of 1875, Agnes was placed into the care of a Mrs Simmons of Newbridge as Frances begin working full time, and Ann Stallard (Frances mother) was already working at Vermont for an Emily Meager. This arrangement was kept until 1877, when a report from a policeman notified the Stallard household that Agnes was being abused in the carer's guardianship, Frances and her mother walked 20 miles to collect Agnes, to bring to their hometown of Chale in the Isle of Wight. Upon collecting the child, it was noted that Agnes, now 2 years of age, was unable to stand or walk and often bled from her nose and ears.

Ann became suspicious after Frances had left their residence in Chale. France having taken Agnes, claiming to have gone to Lymington to place Agnes in the care of George Gatrell's family who lived in England proper. Frances did not return for 4 weeks, so by early 1877, Ann led a search for Agnes which ending by finding Agnes’ body was found in a culvert. When later questioned in court, Frances confessed to killing Agnes by placing a cloth across the child's face to stop Agnes's crying. Frances was then charged with the murder of Agnes on 9 April 1877 in a Winchester court by Lord Coleridge, who sentenced Frances to execution, even though the jury had recommended a mercy verdict. She would carry out this period of her sentence on death row in the Knaphill prison in Surrey, later being transferred to Holloway prison.

After the publication of her story in The Daily Telegraph and other national newspapers, there was a national outcry against the death sentence verdict in the case, and a national petition was sent to the Home Office demanding further action be taken in Stallard's case. The charge was eventually altered to 'penal servitude for life', the outcome being that Stallard served twelve years in prison.

The trial and circumstances of the events of Stallard's life became known to Houstoun circa 1888, and she published her book Only a Womans Life in 1889 in support of Stallards defence in the case. In the same year, Judge Matthews had read Houstoun's work and upon deliberation again with Lord Coleridge over Stallard's case caused the dropping of Stallard's guilty verdict, Stallard was released on 25 July 1889 and returned to the Isle of Wight, where by 1891 she found work as a servant, eventually finding work as a housekeeper. Houstoun later noted she "looked back with thankfulness" for her 1889 work, as it was ‘successful in obtaining [Stallard's] release after twelve years [as a] convict.

Houstoun was noted by Black to ‘[give] little teas and suppers to aged men and women, whose sad cases have from time to time been recommended to her’ in the last years of her life.

== Last years ==
She was known for her art collection which included works by Richard Parkes Bonington, Slingelandt and Francesco Zuccarelli. Houstoun was described herself as a "Liberal who was 'not a Gladstonian'". She was featured in Helen Black's Notable Women Author's of the Day, published in 1893; Black noted that Houstoun was ‘a great reader... in the literature of the day as she is in the records of the past’. She was said to be fond of the literary work of Caroline Norton and Charlotte Riddell in the 1890s.

Suffering from ‘severe neuralgic affection of the joints... [and]... injury to both knees’ she was plagued by continuing health problems from many years as a gardener, leading to Houstoun dying of a cerebral haemorrhage. She died in her home at 16 Gloucester Street, Pimlico, London aged 81.

== Published works ==
- Katerina : the Dwarf of the Jungfernsteig in Bentley's Miscellany Vol. 6 No. 36 (1839) Katerina
- Texas and the Gulf of Mexico; or Yachting in the New World (1844) Vol I Vol II
- Hesperos, or Travels in the West (1850) - Vol I & II
- Such Things Are (1862) Vol I Vol IIVol III
- Recommended to Mercy: A Novel (1862) Vol I Vol II Vol III
- Hazel Combe: or, The Golden Rule (1863) Vol I Vol IIVol III
- Taken upon Trust (1863) Taken Upon Trust
- Zoe's Brand (1864) Vol I Vol IIVol III
- Cyril Blount: or, Trust Money (1865)
- More than a Match: A Novel (1867)
- Sink or Swim?: A Novel (1868) Vol I Vol IIVol III
- The Two Rubies: A Novel (1868)
- Daisie's Dream: A Novel (1869) Vol I Vol IIVol III
- Wide of the Mark: A Novel (1871) Vol I Vol IIVol III
- Gone Like a Shadow: A Novel (1871)
- First in the Field (1872) Vol I Vol IIVol III
- Lilian's Penance (1873) Vol II Vol III
- Barbara's Warning: A Novel (1874) Vol IVol IIVol III
- Greed's Labour Lost: A Novel (1874)
- Done in the Dark: A Novel (1877) Vol I Vol IIVol III
- Records of a Stormy Life (1879) Vol IVol IIVol III
- Twenty Years in the Wild Wild West; or Life in Connaught (1879) Twenty years in the wild west; or, Life in Connaught
- Fixed as Fate (1881)
- The Silver Link (1881)
- Lost in the Crowd: or, Better Broke than Kept (1882) Vol IVol IIVol III
- A woman's Memories of World-Known Men (1883) Vol IVol II
- Caught in a Snare: A Novel (1884)
- A Mad Game (1884)
- The Poor of the Period, or, Leaves from a Loiterer's Diary (1884)
- Under the Lash: A Novel (1885)
- Every Inch a Woman: A Novel (1885)
- Dott Wynyard's Revenge (1886)
- Saved in Time (1886)
- A Heart on Fire: A Novel (1887)
- His Besetting Sin: A Novel (1888)
- Sylvanus Redivivus (the Rev. John Mitford) With a Short Memoir of his Friend and Fellow Naturalist, Edward Jesse (1889)
- Only a Woman's Life; by One Who Saved It (1889)
- A Cruel Wrong: A Novel (1890)
- The Way She Won Him: A Novel (1891) Vol I
- The Heir of Elmdale as an illustrator (1892)
- Their Road to Fortune (1900)

== Sources ==
- Sparks, Tabitha (2014). "Sensation Intervention: M.C. Houstoun's Recommended to Mercy (1862) and the Novel of Experience". In Beller, Anne-Marie; McDonald, Tara (eds.). Rediscovering Victorian Women Sensation Writers: Beyond Braddon. New York: Routledge. pp. 10–23.
