= John Mitford (priest) =

English clergyman and man of letters

John Mitford (1781–1859) was an English clergyman and man of letters.

== Early life ==
Related to Attorney General and politician Lord Redesdale, who became a patron, and to the historian William Mitford, he was born at Richmond, Surrey, on 13 August 1781. He was the elder son of John Mitford (died 18 May 1806), commander of a vessel engaged in the China trade of the East India Company, by his second wife, Mary, eldest daughter of J. Allen of Clifton, Bristol. Early in life he went to school at Richmond, and for a time he was at Tonbridge school, under Vicesimus Knox. But he was mostly brought up in the diocese of Winchester, where the Rev. John Baynes of Exton, near Droxford, Hampshire, was his tutor.

After a brief experience as clerk in the army pay office, Mitford on 6 March 1801 matriculated at Oriel College, Oxford, under the tutorship of Edward Copleston, with Reginald Heber as a close friend, and graduated B.A. on 17 December 1804.

== Cleric ==
On 22 December 1808 he was ordained as a Church of England priest by Henry Bathurst, the bishop of Norwich, and was licensed to the curacy of Kelsale in Suffolk, though he was not a natural cleric. Within months he obtained through Lord Redesdale's interest the vicarage of Benhall, near Saxmundham, to which he was instituted on 17 February 1810, and in August 1815 he became domestic chaplain to Redesdale. In the same month he was appointed to the rectory of Weston St. Mary, and a few years later he was nominated to the rectory of Stratford St. Andrew, both in Suffolk, and then in crown patronage. All these livings were united, during his incumbency, in 1824, when he was reinstituted, and he retained them until his death.

At Benhall Mitford built a parsonage and consolidated the glebe. He planted shrubs and foreign trees, and formed an extensive library, mainly of English poetry. He rented permanent lodgings in Sloane Street, London, where he enjoyed "the most perfect intimacy with Samuel Rogers for more than twenty years". He travelled widely in Britain and Europe.

== Death and legacy ==
Mitford was afflicted by an attack of paralysis, fell down in a London street, and never recovered. For some time he was confined to his rooms in Sloane Street. Finally he was moved to his living, and died at Benhall vicarage on 27 April 1859. He was buried at Stratford St. Andrew.

Mitford's collections were dispersed after his death by Sotheby & Wilkinson. His fine art collection of silver Greek coins, cameos, and miniatures was sold on 30 June 1859, the engravings and drawings on 23 July 1859 and two following days, his Greek and Latin classics on 17 December 1859 and six following days. This sale produced £1,029. 19s. The library of English history, plays, and poetry was sold on 24 April 1860 and eleven following days, producing £2,999 2s.; and his manuscripts on 9 July 1860, producing £817 3s. The manuscripts contained three volumes of autograph letters, papers relating to Thomas Gray, his own recollections in fifty-five volumes, the correspondence of Jonathan Toup. Many of the books, with his notes, went to the libraries of Alexander Dyce and John Forster at the South Kensington Museum, or in the library of the British Museum. His commonplace-books are now Add MSS 32559-32575 of the British Library, and from them were printed Some Conversations with the Duke of Wellington.

== Works ==
In 1833 Mitford began to contribute to the Gentleman's Magazine a series of articles on the old English poets and on sacred poetry, paying particular attention to the works of Prudentius. During that year William Pickering purchased a share in the magazine, and a new series was started in January 1834: Mitford became editor. For seventeen years Mitford contributed monthly, and he edited the magazine successfully until the end of 1850. During these years he also wrote numerous poems signed J. M. His communications dropped off after 1850.

By 1811 Mitford had contemplated an edition of Thomas Gray's Works, and in 1814 he edited the first accurate edition of The Poems of Thomas Gray, with Critical Notes, a Life of the Author, and an Essay on his Poetry. In 1816 he published two volumes of The Works of Thomas Gray, adding to the published letters. Much of his work reappeared in the Aldine edition of Gray's Works in 5 vols. (2 vols. in 1835, 2 vols. in 1836, 1 vol. in 1843). The last volume, however, consisted mainly of the poet's correspondence with Norton Nicholls, and this was also issued in a separate volume. The Eton edition in 1847 of the poems contained An Original Life of Gray by Mitford, which was inserted in the subsequent impressions of 1852 and 1863. In 1853 he edited the Correspondence of Gray and Mason, with some Letters addressed by Gray to the Rev. James Brown, D.D., and some pages of notes were printed in 1855. Many of Mitford's comments were reproduced in Edmund Gosse's edition of Gray, while from his manuscripts were drawn much of the information in Tovey's Gray and his Friends.

When Pickering launched the Aldine edition of the British poets he enlisted the services of Mitford. For it he edited, with memoirs, in addition to the poems of Gray, those of

- William Cowper, 1830, 3 vols. (memoir written by John Bruce in 1865 edit.);
- Oliver Goldsmith, 1831;
- John Milton, 1832, 3 vols., with sonnet to Charles Sumner;
- John Dryden, 1832-3, 5 vols. (life rewritten by the Rev. Richard Hooper in the 1865 and 1866 editions);
- Thomas Parnell, 1833 and 1866 (with epistle in verse to Alexander Dyce);
- Jonathan Swift, 1833-4, 3 vols., and 1866;
- Edward Young, 1834, 2 vols. (with sonnet), 1858 and 1866;
- Matthew Prior, 1835, 2 vols., 1866;
- Samuel Butler, 1835, 2 vols. (with verses to William Lisle Bowles), 1866;
- William Falconer, 1836, 1866 (with sonnet);
- Edmund Spenser, 1839, 5 vols. (with four sonnets, re-edited by John Payne Collier in 1866).

The text and lives by Mitford in the original Aldine edition were reprinted at Boston, United States, in 1854-6, and his notes to Milton's Poems were reprinted, after correction, in an edition of the Poetical Works of Milton and Marvell, Boston, in 1878. In 1851 he edited The Works of Milton in Verse and Prose', 8 vols., and wrote for it a memoir, expanded from that in the 1832 edition of the 'Poems.'

Among Mitford's other works were:

- Agnes, the Indian Captive: a poem, in four cantos; with other poems, 1811.
- 'A Letter to Richard Heber on Mr. Weber's late edition of Ford's Dramatic Works,' 1812, a severe criticism. The letter to John Philip Kemble (1811) on the same subject, which was said by Halkett and Laing (ii. 1382) to have been "written chiefly by Mitford", was assigned in the British Museum Catalogue to G. D. Whittington of Cambridge.
- Sacred Specimens selected from the Early English Poets, with Prefatory Remarks, 1827.
- Poemata Latine partim reddita partim scripta a V. Bourne, 1840; Latin verse by Vincent Bourne, with life by Mitford.
- Correspondence of Horace Walpole and Rev. W. Mason, ed., with notes, by Mitford, 1851, 2 vols. Some of his annotations were reproduced by Peter Cunningham in his edition of Walpole's Letters.
- Lines suggested by a fatal Shipwreck near Aldborough, 3 Nov. 1855, n.p. 1855; 2nd edit., Woodbridge, 1856.
- Cursory Notes on various Passages in the Text of Beaumont and Fletcher, as edited by Rev. Alexander Dyce, 1856; complimentary to Dyce.
- Miscellaneous Poems, 1858; a selection from his fugitive pieces.

John Raw's Pocket-book for 1830 and later years contained poems by Mitford; his lines "On the Aldine Anchor", in the Gentleman's Magazine for 1836, and in Notes and Queries, were printed for separate circulation. Further poems were inserted in the last periodical, 3rd ser. ix. 58, in Matilda Charlotte Houstoun's A Woman's Memories and her Sylvanus Redivivus, and in John Glyde's New Suffolk Garland (1866); and some Remarks on the Mustard Tree of Scripture were preserved at the Dyce Library, South Kensington Museum.

Mitford was in early life a cricketer, and from the conversation of William Fennex, a cricket veteran whom he supported by charitable work in his garden at Benhall, he wrote many newspaper articles and compiled a manuscript volume, which he gave to the Rev. James Pycroft in 1836. On it Pycroft laid the structure of his work on the Cricket Field, 1851.

On his letters was based a volume of Sylvanus Redivivus (the Rev. John Mitford). With a short Memoir of Edward Jesse. By M. Houstoun, 1889, reissued in 1891 as Letters and Reminiscences of the Rev. John Mitford. With a Sketch of Edward Jesse. By C. M. He wrote many letters to Bernard Barton, and Charles Lamb frequently refers to him in his correspondence with Barton. Many of his letters afterwards passed to Edward FitzGerald, who collected and bound together Mitford's papers in the Gentleman's Magazine; the volume became the property of William Aldis Wright. A letter from him on his notice of the early works of Mary Russell Mitford in the Quarterly Review, which was cropped by William Gifford, is in Friendships of Miss Mitford, and a communication on an ancient garden at Chelsea is in Alfred Guy Kingan L'Estrange's Village of Palaces.

Mitford recommended to John Bowyer Nichols the publication of Bishop Percy's Correspondence, which formed most of the seventh and eighth volumes of the Illustrations of the Literary History of the Eighteenth Century; the seventh volume was dedicated to him.

== Family ==
Mitford married at St. George's, Hanover Square, London, on 21 October 1814, Augusta, second daughter of Edward Boodle, of Brook Street, Grosvenor Square, London, who died at her son's house, Weston Lodge, Hampstead, on 25 December 1886, aged 92, and was buried at Hampstead cemetery on 29 December. The wedding day was extremely turbulent as John Mitford wanted his illegitimate child John Mitford Ling to be part of the family. Due to the separation the only child of the unhappy marriage was Robert Henry Mitford. Robert was born on 24 July 1815, and married at Wellow, Somerset, on 12 August 1847, Anne, youngest daughter of Lieutenant-colonel William Henry Wilby, their eldest son being Robert Sidney Mitford of the Home Office. John Mitford Ling had a career in medicine, with his wife Mary Ann Pallant in Suffolk.
