= Francis Bourgeois (painter) =

English painter

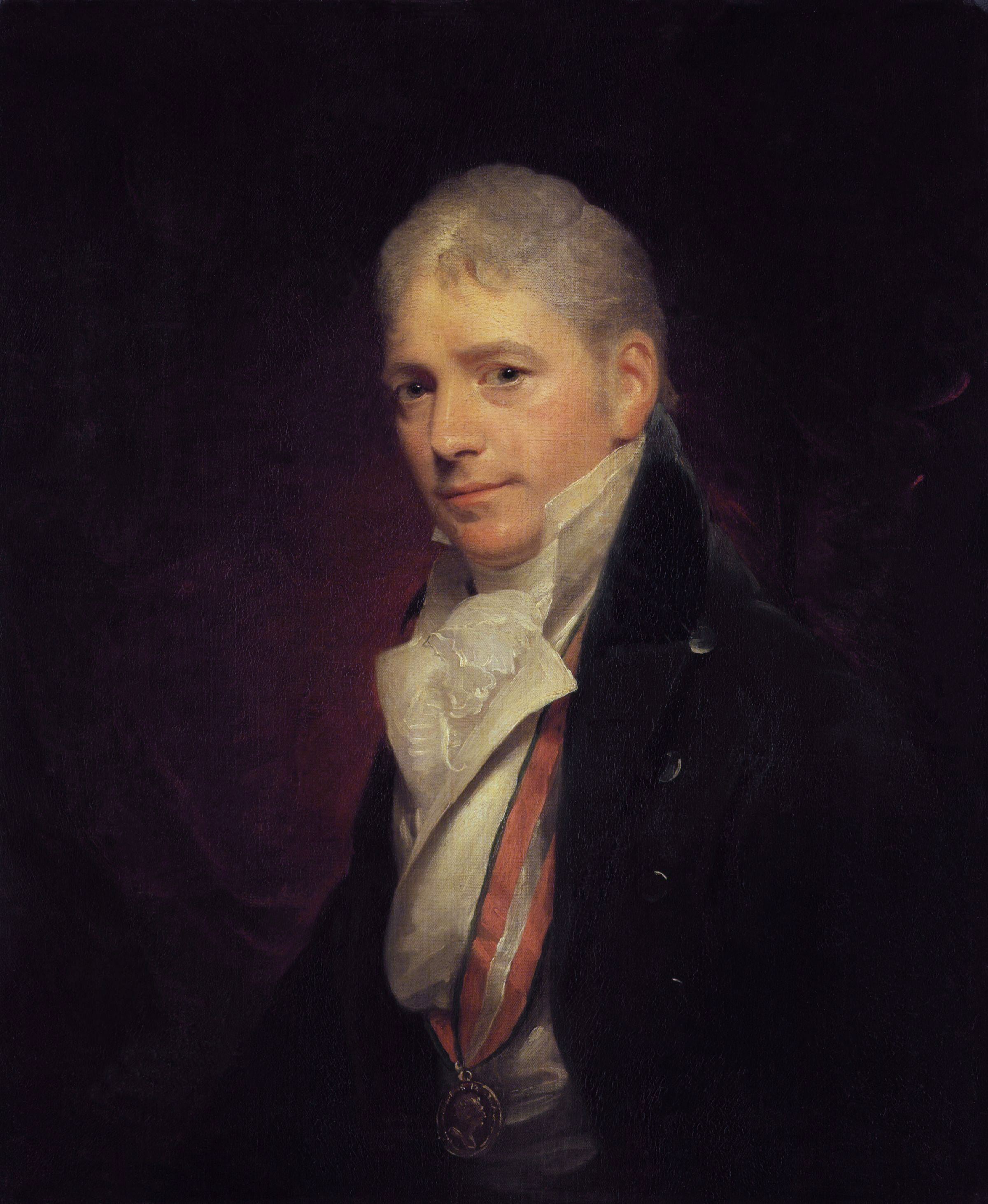
Portrait of Francis Bourgeois, by William Beechey, 1810

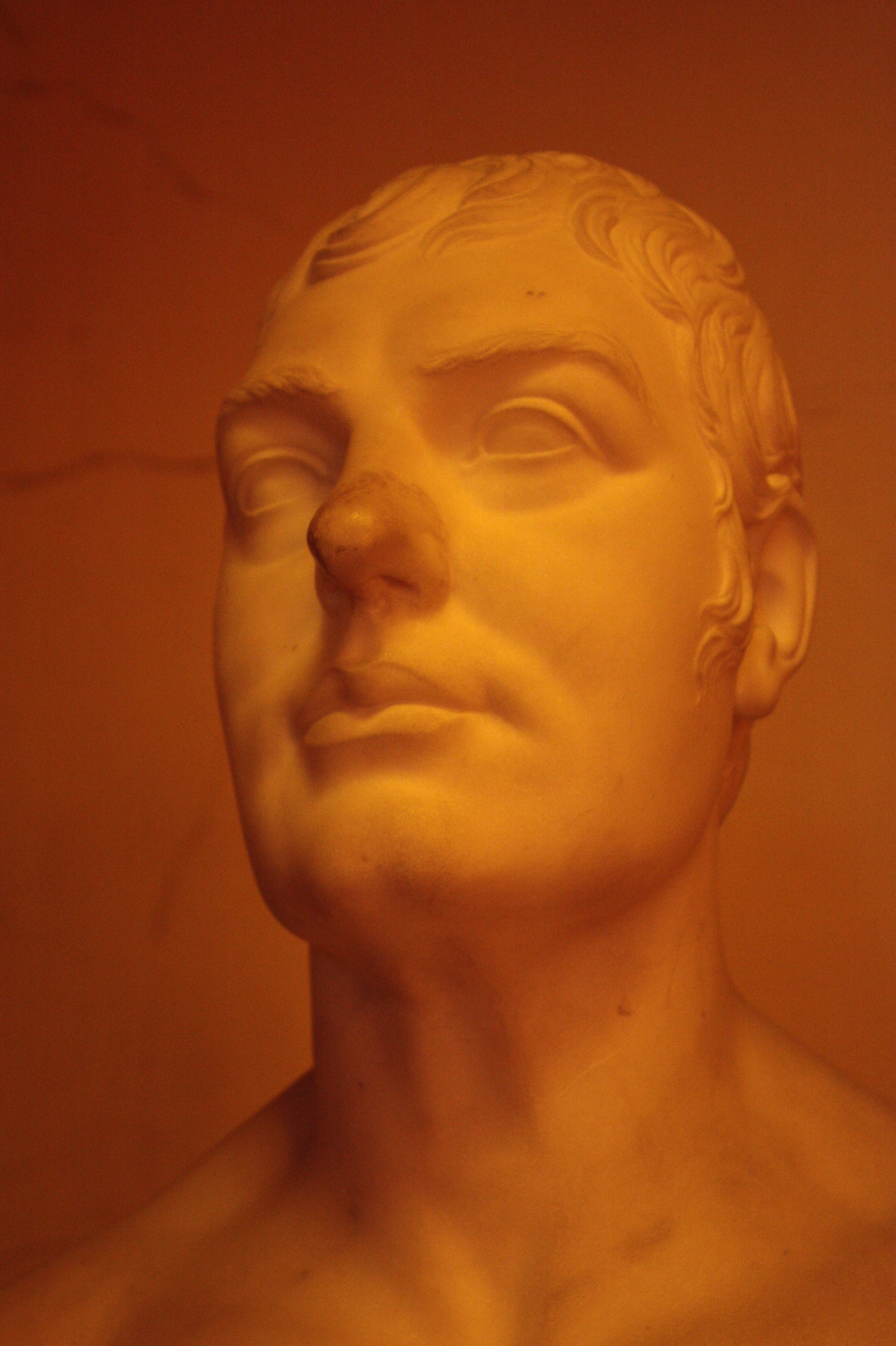
Bust of Peter Bourgeois, Dulwich Art Gallery

Sir Peter Francis Lewis Bourgeois RA (November 1753 – 8 January 1811) was an English landscape painter and history painter, and court painter to King George III of the United Kingdom.

In the late 18th century he became an art dealer and collector in association with Frenchman Noël Desenfans. The pair were commissioned by Polish King Stanisław August Poniatowski to compile a collection of paintings, which they spent five years doing, but Stanisław's exile in 1795 meant the contract could not be completed and they were left with a large collection of paintings. Bourgeois outlived Desenfans and bequeathed the art to Dulwich College with an additional £2000 to build a permanent building to house it. This became the Dulwich Picture Gallery, England's first purpose-built public art gallery.

== Biography ==
Bourgeois was born in London in November 1753 (or, according to Royal Academy records, in 1756). He was the son of Isaac Emanuel Bourgeois, a prosperous emigre Swiss watchmaker, and Elizabeth Bourgeois (née Gordon or Garden). He had a sister. In 1768, when he was fifteen, his mother died and he and his sister were abandoned by their father. Some time afterward he was taken into the protection of Noel Joseph Desenfans, a writer who had come from France to Britain in 1769.

Bourgeois studied painting as a pupil of Philip James de Loutherbourg. In 1776, at the age of 23, Bourgeois made a tour of Europe. When in Warsaw he met bishop Michal Jerzy Poniatowski, primate of Poland and brother of the Polish king, Stanislaw II.

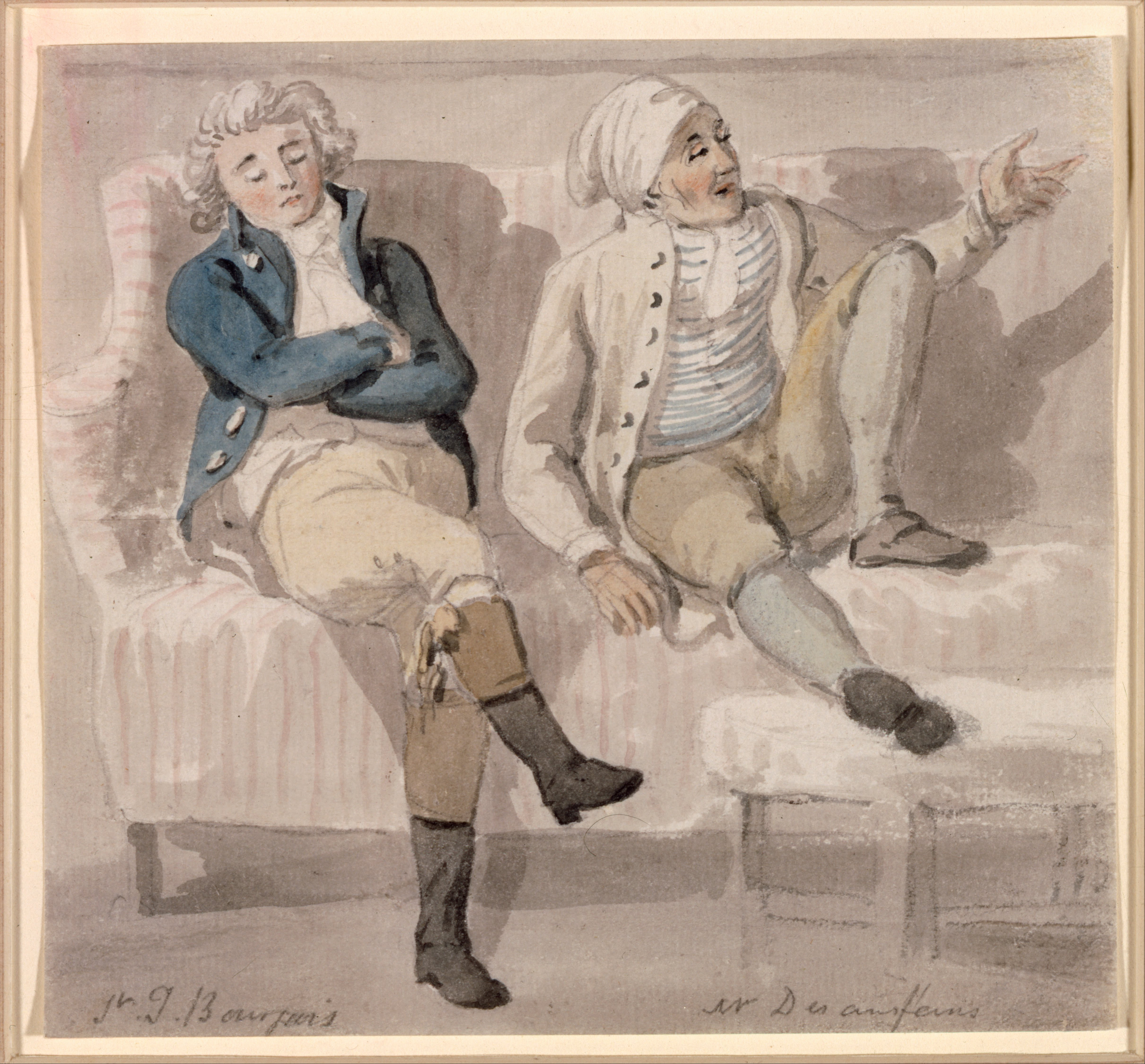
Francis Bourgeois and Noël Desenfans

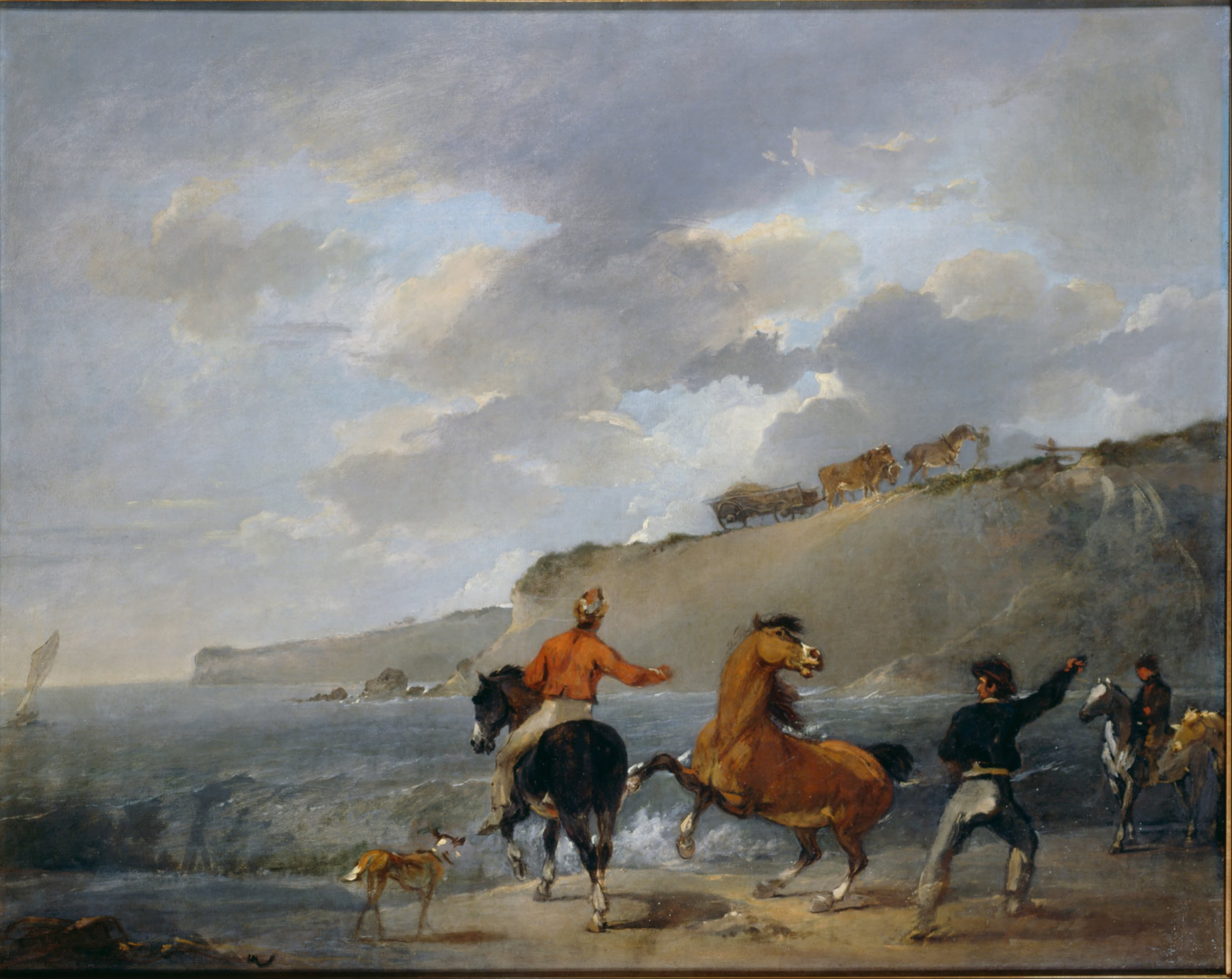
Sea Shore with Rearing Horse, c. 1792, Dulwich Art Gallery

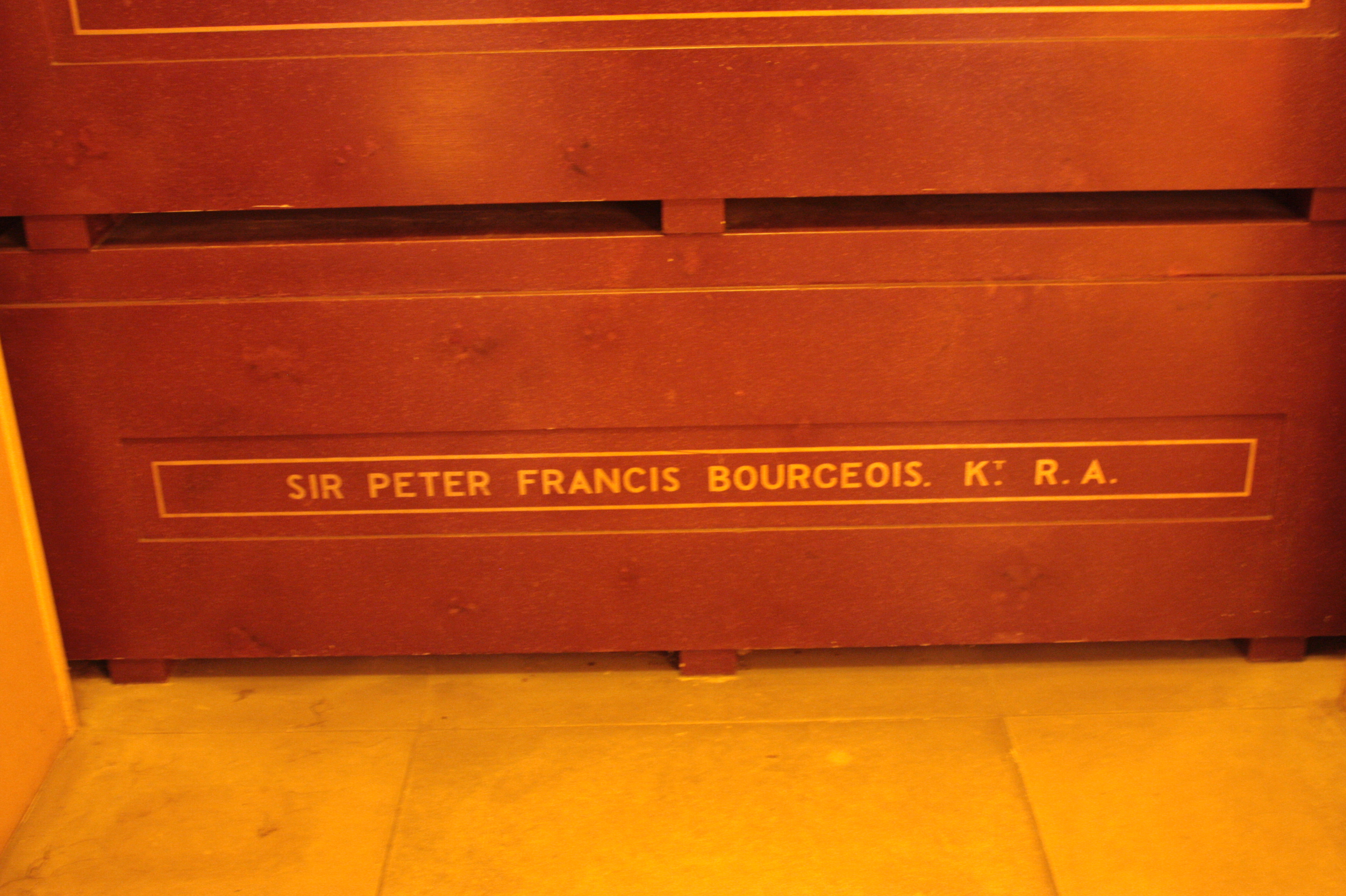
The sealed coffin of Sir Peter Bourgeois, Dulwich Art Gallery

In the same year, his protector Noel Desenfans married Margaret Morris, an heiress and sister of the Swansea industrialist, John Morris. By the 1780s Margaret and Noel Desenfans were collecting pictures and discreetly dealing. Bourgeois lived with them at their house in Charlotte (now Hallam) Street, London.

In December 1787 Bourgeois was elected an Associate of the Royal Academy and was elected a full member on 11 February 1793, when he donated a landscape painting as his diploma work.

In 1791 Bourgeois's friend, Michal Poniatowski visited London to commission Bourgeois to paint a portrait of the king Stanislaw (now in Dulwich Picture Gallery). For this Bourgeois was presented with the Polish medal "Merentibus", for which George III allowed him to use the title of 'Sir' in Britain. While in London Poniatowski asked Noel and Margaret Desenfans and Bourgeois to assemble a royal collection for Poland. During the next five years, Bourgeois joined Margaret and Noel Desenfans touring Europe and buying pictures and continued his own painting in 1794 he was appointed landscape-painter to George III.

The collection assembled for King Stanislaw included works by Vernet, Rembrandt, Veronese, and others. In 1795 Desenfans was appointed Polish consul general in London, but a few months later Stanislaw was forced to abdicate and the dealers were left with the collection. Their attempts to sell it to Alexander I of Russia or the British Government proved unsuccessful and in 1799 Desenfans published a Plan for establishing some national galleries in Britain, of which the collection might form a basis, and in 1802 he exhibited the collection in London with a sale Catalogue. The collection remained unsold. Bourgeois shared the Desenfans' wish that the collection should be exhibited publicly, and when he died in 1811 he left it to Dulwich College with £10,000 to build a public gallery. Dulwich Picture Gallery - one of the first public art galleries anywhere in Britain was founded. The gallery was designed by Sir John Soane, who also designed the attached mausoleum, in which Bourgeois, Margaret Desenfans and Nöel Desenfans rest in sealed coffins (visible on request).

His death was indirectly caused by a horse riding accident and came about when he refused to have his leg amputated and dismissed his physician. His body was later entombed in the Mausoleum of Dulwich Picture Gallery.

A portrait of Bourgeois by William Beechey is in the collection of the National Portrait Gallery and another by James Northcote is at the Dulwich Picture Gallery. George Dance the Younger made a pencil portrait of him, and he is included in Henry Singleton's 1795 group portrait The Royal Academicians in General Assembly (at the Royal Academy of Arts, London).

Family members of Francis Bourgeois included Victor H. Bourgeois (1864–1935) and Louise Forget-Bourgeois (1830–1914).

== Paintings ==
- Paysage Anglais, huile signe P.F. Bourgeois 1787, dimensions 47 cm de hauteur et 67 cm de large, Bourgeois family
- An Extensive Picturesque Landscape with Gypsies, by Sir Francis Bourgeois (oil on canvas, 109.2 x 160 cm. - Tabley House the Dining Room, Knutsford, Cheshire, U.K.)
- A Scene in Coriolanus, with a portrait of the late J. P. Kemble as Coriolanus, by Sir Francis Bourgeois (1790s. oil on canvas, 110.5 x 88.9 cm. Sir John Soane's Museum, London)
- The Chestnut Hunter, oil on canvas, 33¾"×43", signed and dated lower right "P. F. Bourgeois 1781, framed, titled and labeled on reverse: "British Sporting Paintings," exhibited at Harris Museum and Art Gallery, Preston, England, 1943, loaned by Messrs. Frost & Reed, London, registered stock # of F.R. (Frost & Reed) B311. Note: Label on reverse lists the artist as Sir F. P. Bourgeois, however the biographical listing in E. Benezet is Sir Peter Francis Bourgeois. Condition: Under black light a few small areas of inpainting in the sky and an area to the right of the horse noted; basically in very fine condition. October 2003 Schrager Auction Galleries Ltd. item 1285 price was $18,000.00
- The Ferry's Crossing watercolour/paper 24×37.5 cm sold 9 Sep 1993
- Tobias and the Angel oil panel 20.3×20.8 cm Bourgeois bequest 1811 at the Dulwich Picture Gallery
- Seashore oil canvas 101×106.3 cm Bourgeois bequest 1811 at the Dulwich Picture Gallery
- Friar in Prayer oil panel 16.5×12 cm Bourgeois bequest 1811 at the Dulwich Picture Gallery
- Soldiers oil panel 16.5×12 cm Bourgeois bequest 1811 at the Dulwich Picture Gallery
- Man holding a Horse oil canvas 21×15.8 cm Bourgeois bequest 1811 at the Dulwich Picture Gallery
- Tiger Hunt oil canvas 114.3×142.2 cm Bourgeois bequest 1811 at the Dulwich Picture Gallery
- Landscape with Cattle oil canvas 91.7×145.1 cm Bourgeois bequest 1811 at the Dulwich Picture Gallery
- Cupid oil canvas 60.6×81.9 cm Bourgeois bequest 1811 at the Dulwich Picture Gallery
- Landscape with Cattle oil canvas 101.9×127.5 cm Bourgeois bequest 1811 at the Dulwich Picture Gallery
- Landscape with Soldiers oil canvas 63.8×75.8 cm Bourgeois bequest 1811 at the Dulwich Picture Gallery
- Figures in a Landscape oil canvas 43.2×76.2 cm Bourgeois bequest 1811 at the Dulwich Picture Gallery
- Landscape with Cattle oil canvas 42.9×53 cm Bourgeois bequest 1811 at the Dulwich Picture Gallery
- Cavalry in a Landscape oil canvas 40×67.9 cm Bourgeois bequest 1811 at the Dulwich Picture Gallery
- Self-portrait oil canvas 61×51.8 cm provenance gift of the executors of Sir Felix Agar
- Sir Peter Francis Bourgeois, creator Sir Peter Francis Bourgeois after Sir William Beechey oil canvas 76.2×60.9 cm damaged 1939/45 Bourgeois bequest 1811 at the Dulwich Picture Gallery
- Sir Peter Francis Bourgeois, creator Sir Peter Francis Bourgeois after Sir William Beechey oil canvas 76.5×64.1 cm Bourgeois bequest 1811 at the Dulwich Picture Gallery
- William Tell oil canvas 76.8×110.2 cm Bourgeois bequest 1811 at the Dulwich Picture Gallery
- Seashore oil canvas 91.7×146.7 cm Bourgeois bequest 1811 at the Dulwich Picture Gallery
- Landscape with Cattle oil canvas 79.4×107.9 cm Bourgeois bequest 1811 at the Dulwich Picture Gallery
- Funeral Procession oil canvas 131.5×206.1 cm Bourgeois bequest 1811 at the Dulwich Picture Gallery
- Religion in the Desert oil canvas 94.6×120 cm damaged 1939/45 Bourgeois bequest 1811 at the Dulwich
- A Man on Horseback, called Noel Desenfans creator ascribed to Bourgeois, Sir Peter Francis 1756 1811 oil canvas 119.7×101 cm; is the only picture in the collection that could conceivably be identified with no.273 in the 1813 inventory ('Desenfans up on Horse' by Bourgeois). The attribution to Bourgeois, however seems impossible and the identity of the sitter indeterminate. Provenance London, London, Sir Francis Bourgeois, 1811
- Richard Earlom after Sir Peter Francis Bourgeois, Smugglers Defeated. From the original Picture in the Collection of Noel Desenfans Esqr. &c. London, B. B. Evans 1 May 1798. Mezzotint. 520×690mm
- Scene pastorale, dessin lave de sepia, British Museum
- Etude de troupeaux, aquarelle gouache, British Museum
- Peter Francis Bourgeois, The Ferry's Crossing, Watercolor w/scratching out, 9.5×14.8 in. / 24.2×37;5 cm, Signed, sold by Bonhams Chelsea: 9.September 1993 Lot 130 English and Continental Watercolours and Drawings
- Attributed To Peter Francis Bourgeois, Whispering sweet nothings, Oil on Canvas, 28.2×34.5 in. / 71.8×87.6 cm., sold by New Orleans Auction Galleries: 17 November 2002 Lot 975 Sale 0206, no picture available
- After Peter Francis Bourgeois, Cottage Cares (+ Rural Innocence; 2 works by J. Whessell), 1806–, Medium stipple engravings in colors, 24×20.5 in. / 61×52 cm., R. Bowyer, pub., sold by Christie's South Kensington: 27.April 2006 Lot 2773, British and Continental Pictures
- A Hen defending her chickens from the attack of a cat (oil on canvas, 37 x 98 cm. Sir John Soane's Museum, London)
- Landscape (ca. 1793. Royal Academy of Arts, London)
