= Vincent Bourne =

British classical scholar

Vincent Bourne, familiarly known as Vinny Bourne (1695 – 2 December 1747), was an English classical scholar and Neo-Latin poet.

== Life ==
Even near contemporaries could find little biographical information about Vincent Bourne. His father's name was Andrew; Vincent was born in 1695. In 1710 he was admitted to Westminster School and was elected to a scholarship at Trinity College, Cambridge, on 27 May 1714, proceeding to B.A. in 1717 and becoming a fellow of his college in 1720. In 1721, the year he commenced his M.A., he edited a collection of Carmina Comitialia which contains, among the Miscellanea at the end, some verses of his own, including his tripos poem on Androcles.

On leaving Cambridge he became a master at Westminster School, and continued to hold this appointment until his death. He was a man of peaceful temperament, content to pass his life in indolent repose. As a teacher he wanted energy, and he was a very lax disciplinarian. The poet William Cowper, who was one of his pupils and particularly fond of Bourne, commented that he was so inattentive to his pupils, and so indifferent whether they brought him good or bad exercises, that "he seemed determined, as he was the best, so to be the last, Latin poet of the Westminster line." In another letter Cowper wrote, "I lost more than I got by him; for he made me as idle as himself."

In 1734 he published his Poemata, Latine partim reddita, partim scripta, with a dedication to the Duke of Newcastle, and in November of the same year he was appointed housekeeper and deputy sergeant-at-arms to the House of Commons. Later the Duke of Newcastle offered him valuable ecclesiastical preferment, which he declined from conscientious motives. In a letter to his wife, written shortly before his death, he summed up his feelings: "I own and declare that the importance of so great a charge, joined with a mistrust of my own sufficiency, made me fearful of undertaking it: if I have not in that capacity assisted in the salvation of souls, I have not been the means of losing any; if I have not brought reputation to the function by any merit of mine, I have the comfort of this reflection — I have given no scandal to it by my meanness and unworthiness."

Bourne died on 2 December 1747 and was buried at Fulham. His will mentions two children: a daughter named Lucia after her mother and his son Thomas, who was a lieutenant in the marines and about to sail for India. It also mentions a house in Westminster and farm in Bungay. In later years, Mrs Bourne became a Sister at the Royal Hospital and Collegiate Church of Saint Katharine. She was followed there by her daughter, who died unmarried in 1807.

== Works ==
There were nine editions of Bourne's Latin poems in all, of which the posthumous 1772 quarto was criticised for containing several that demonstrably did not belong to him. Later editions were sometimes accompanied by the translations of others, notably the nineteen written by Cowper. The final 1840 edition of his Poematia contains a memoir and a survey of his writing by John Mitford. Thereafter he was little noticed until the recent revival of interest in Latin poetry.

William Cowper's too partial assessment of Bourne's poetry, in a letter to the Reverend John Newton dated 10 May 1781, frequently prefaced the various editions of his work. "I love the memory of Vinny Bourne. I think him a better Latin poet than Tibullus, Propertius, Ausonius, or any of the writers in his way except Ovid, and not at all inferior to him." Charles Lamb was also an admirer and translated eight more of his poems. In an enthusiastic letter to William Wordsworth, written in 1815, he summed up Bourne's poetical approach as "sucking from every flower, making a flower of everything! His diction all Latin, and his thoughts all English!"

The charm of Bourne's poems lies not so much in the elegance of his Latinity as in the breadth and humour of his subject matter. He had quick sympathy for his fellow-men, and loving tenderness towards all animals. His epitaphs are models of simplicity and grace. A later critic commented on his epigrammatic style that "his natural taste brought to that form an almost lyrical delicacy of touch which makes his vignettes of contemporary life a new genre … In Bourne it is the exact and sympathetic observation of the particular contemporary scene which charms us. His work shows the final and complete emancipation of the eighteenth-century Latin poet from the theory of imitating the classics which had dominated the Renaissance."

Some of his subjects tested his linguistic ingenuity to the full, having to encompass a man smoking a pipe, a magic lantern show, a pair of spectacles, a coach too full of people, or a crowd milling about street ballad singers. His playfulness is particularly apparent in treating animal subjects such as a jackdaw inhabiting a steeple, a snail, or sparrows feeding in a Cambridge college, all poems translated by Cowper. Another, Canis et Echo, features a dog barking at the Moon reflected in the Thames, and then at the echo of its own voice. The theme is further imitated by repetition within the text:

Audiit et vanas ludicra nympha minas:
Audiit; et rabie rabiem lepidissima vindex.

Nevertheless, despite the elegance and adaptability of Bourne's style, the essayist A. C. Benson comments that "an exhaustive account of his Latinity would be a long enumeration of minute mistakes arising from the imperfect acquaintance of the scholars of the day with the principles of correct Latinity", Bourne's final 19th century editor having enumerated these at some length. But, Benson concludes, his former popularity as a poet rested on the fact that he was "a man with a warm heart and a capacious eye, finding any trait of human character, any grouping of the grotesque or tender furniture of life, interesting and memorable....Absent-minded he may have been, but observant he was to a peculiar degree, and that not of broad poetical effects, but of the minute detail and circumstance of every-day life."

In addition, Bourne translated into Latin poems by some of the principal Augustan poets of his time, including Nicholas Rowe, John Gay, Matthew Prior, John Arbuthnot and Joseph Addison, whose "Three Divine Hymns" fitted his religious frame of mind. In particular also he translated narratives such as David Mallet's "William and Margaret" and Thomas Tickell's ballad of "Lucy and Colin". As these writers adapted the Augustan spirit to themes of the time, so Bourne endeavoured also to update the Latin language to encompass similar themes.
