= Edward Jesse =

English writer (1780–1868)

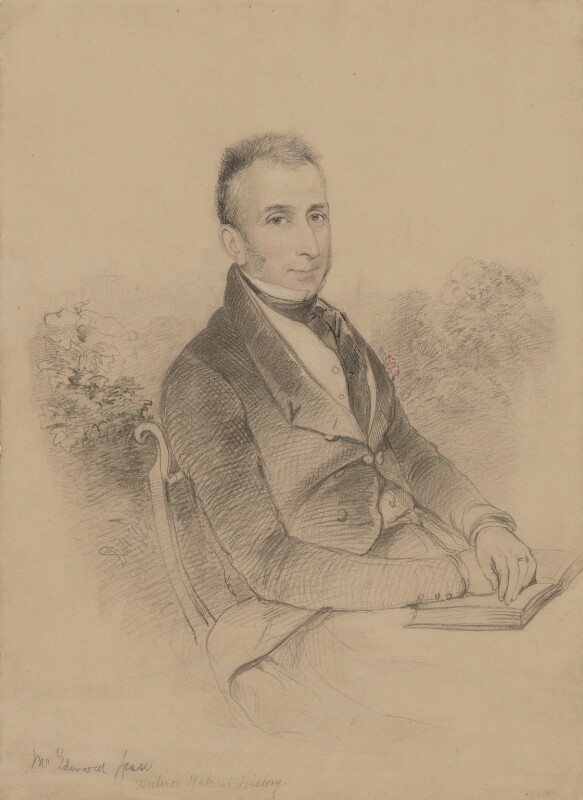
- Edward Jesse, 1844
- Born: 14 January 1780; Hutton Cranswick
- Died: 28 March 1868 (aged 88); Brighton
- Notable work: Gleanings in Natural History (1832); An Angler's Ramblers (1836); Summer's Day at Hampton Court (1st ed. 1839); Anecdotes of Dogs (1846); WIndsor Castle and Its Environs, including Eton College (2nd ed. 1858); Lectures on Natural History (1861)
- Spouses: Matilda Morris (1807–c. 1851); Jane Caroline (1852–1868)
- Children: John Heneage Jesse; Matilda Charlotte Houstoun
- Parents: Reverend William Jesse; Mary Jesse
- Relatives: Lucy Townsend (sister)

Edward Jesse (14 January 1780 – 28 March 1868) was an English writer on natural history. As a surveyor for the Office of Works, he was responsible for much of the restoration and presentation of Hampton Court Palace after it was opened to the public in 1838.

== Life ==
Jesse was born at Hutton Cranswick, Yorkshire, the third son and youngest of four children (Note: Including abolitionist Lucy Townsend, Jesse's sister.) of Reverend William Jesse (1738–1814) and Mary Jesse. Originally the parish vicar for Hutton Cranswick, Rev. Jesse later became a prominent evangelical vicar in West Bromwich and personal chaplain to the 2nd Earl of Dartmouth, a convert of Selina Hastings.

Jesse was privately educated, and in 1798 was appointed to a clerkship in the Santo Domingo office. (Note: On the recommendation of noted evangelical and abolitionist William Wilberforce) Jesse's command of French recommended him to the 3rd Earl of Dartmouth, who made Jesse his private secretary on his appointment in 1801 as President of the Board of Control (overseeing the British East India Company). Following his promotion to Lord Steward in 1802, Dartmouth commended Jesse to the Royal Household, and Jesse was appointed to the ceremonial post of Gentleman of the Ewry (Note: Michelle Charlotte Houstoun would write later of her father's appointment: "The duties which this post as "Gentleman of the Ewry" entailed were of the slightest, consisting merely of an attendance, in full court dress, at coronations and such-like ceremonies, on which occasions the office of the gentleman "in question was to present on his bended knee a golden ewer or basin filled with rose-water to the sovereign. Into that rosewater the royal fingers were dipped, and subsequently wiped on a fine damask napkin fringed with gold, which the. "Gentleman of the Ewry," for the yearly pay of £300, independently of "perquisites", carried, in hotel-waiter fashion, upon his arm. This absurd and useless office has been happily long since done away with, but whilst it existed its influence over my father's prospects in life was very considerable." Houstoun (1889), pp. 6–7) in 1803 (which he held until its abolition in 1832). Jesse was also commissioned a lieutenant colonel of the Birmingham Volunteers, and on the corps disbandment (Note: After the threat of a Napoleonic invasion of England had passed.) the Duke of Rutland appointed Jesse as captain in the Leicestershire Militia in 1805. In 1814 Jesse was made a Commissioner of Hackney Coaches (or 'Jarvies'), which he held until responsibility for coach licensing was transferred to the Stamp Office in 1831.

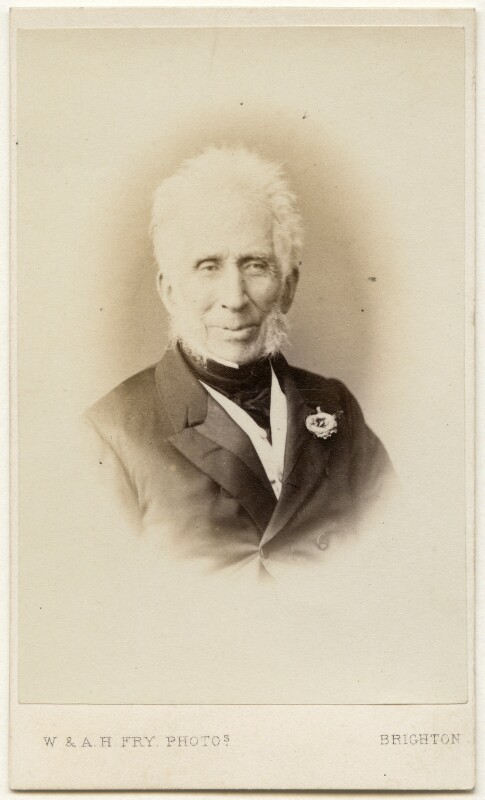
Edward Jesse 1867

Jesse was made a clerk in the Office of Woods and Forests by Lord Glenbervie c. 1821, and following the abolition of the posts of Gentleman of the Ewry and Hackney Coach Commissioner, was appointed Itinerant Deputy Surveyor in the Office of Woods, Forests and Land Revenues, with responsibility for Hampton Court Palace and Windsor Castle, in 1834. On the abolition of this office he retired on a pension, and he died in 1868 at Brighton.

Jesse married his first wife, Matilda Morris, daughter of Sir John Morris, 1st Baronet in 1807. Their son, John, born 1809, became a noted court historian. Their eldest daughter Frances, born 1810, married Edward Curwen, a lieutenant in the 14th Dragoons, in 1833. Their youngest daughter Matilda, born 1811, became a noted author and women's rights activist. Following Matilda's death c. 1851, Jesse married Jane Caroline in 1852, who survived him.

== Works ==
=== Natural history ===
The result of his interest in the habits and characteristics of animals was a series of pleasant and popular books on natural history. He also edited Izaak Walton's The Compleat Angler. (See Bibliography).

=== Guide books ===
Jesse contributed to the second edition of Leitch Ritchie's Windsor Castle, and edited later editions of Gilbert White's Selborne. He wrote a number of handbooks to places of interest, including Windsor and Hampton Court (see Bibliography).

=== Hampton Court Palace ===
In 1832 the Office of Works and Public Buildings was subsumed into the Office of Woods, Forests and Land Revenues, and responsibility for the maintenance of unoccupied Royal palaces was passed to the reconstituted Office of Works in 1838. As Itinerant Deputy Surveyor with responsibility for the districts of Hampton Court and Windsor, Hampton Court Palace fell under Jesse's responsibility.

The Palace was opened to the general public in December 1838, (Note: The last monarch to reside at the palace was George II, and informal tours of the palace and its art collection had been conducted by the staff since the 18th century. The decision to open the palace to the general public was made following the death of the long-serving housekeeper, Lady Emily Montagu, on 21 April 1838. Lord Duncannon, First Commissioner of Woods and Forests, immediately recommended to (the then-19 year old) Queen Victoria that the housekeeper role be abolished. In August the State Apartments were closed to make preparations for opening to the general public, which took place on Tuesday 4 December.) initially displaying works from the Royal Collection in the State Apartments, with only the interior courtyards, gardens and Apartments open for viewing. Previously, members of the public had been able to tour the palace in small groups conducted by the housekeeper, but the Great Hall had been inaccessible throughout. (Note: A situation described at the time as like "a performance of Hamlet without the principal character". See "Hampton Court Palace". The Mirror of Literature, Amusement and Instruction. 25 (710): 161. 14 March 1835.) The Hall had been cleared in the early 18th century by architect James Wyatt (on the orders of George III), removing the theatre fixtures and fittings installed by William III and George I, and adding a new door at the east end of the Hall through to the Great Watching Chamber.

In July 1840 Jesse began a substantial restoration of the Great Hall for public display, his Romantic interpretation aiming to give "an appearance similar, perhaps, to that it formerly presented when it was occupied by the Cardinal of York and his princely retinue." Jesse's restoration was influenced by the Gothic Revival of the mid-nineteenth century, and in particular the work of architects Jeffry Wyatville (who had remodelled Windsor Castle), and Edward Blore, who had assisted Jesse with the Tudor restoration of the West Front of Hampton Court Palace. (Note: Including the replacement of 17th century sash windows with reproduction Gothic arched windows.) Jesse was also influenced by the historical novels of Walter Scott, whose tales of romantic chivalry in medieval settings (Note: e.g. Ivanhoe, Rob Roy, Waverley) were popular with the Victorian reading public; Jesse referenced Scott in several of his works.

Jesse decorated the Great Hall with stag's heads between each window, banners displaying the "devices of Henry VIII and the arms of Wolsey", and a string course of Tudor roses and portcullises. Jesse commissioned a statue of St George slaying the Dragon, (Note: At a cost of £60.) which was placed on "a richly-carved stone bracket, inscribed 'Seynt George for merrie Englande,'". Tapestries depicting The Story of Abraham were moved from the State Apartments, where they had formed the backdrop to the growing population of paintings from the Royal Collection, to hang in the Great Hall (Note: Where they remain today.), Jesse noting each to be "of such excellent design, and of such costliness of material, that it may be safely asserted that its parallel does not exist in Europe at this time." Collections of arms and armour were placed at either end of the Hall, specially-commissioned or loaned from the Tower of London collection.

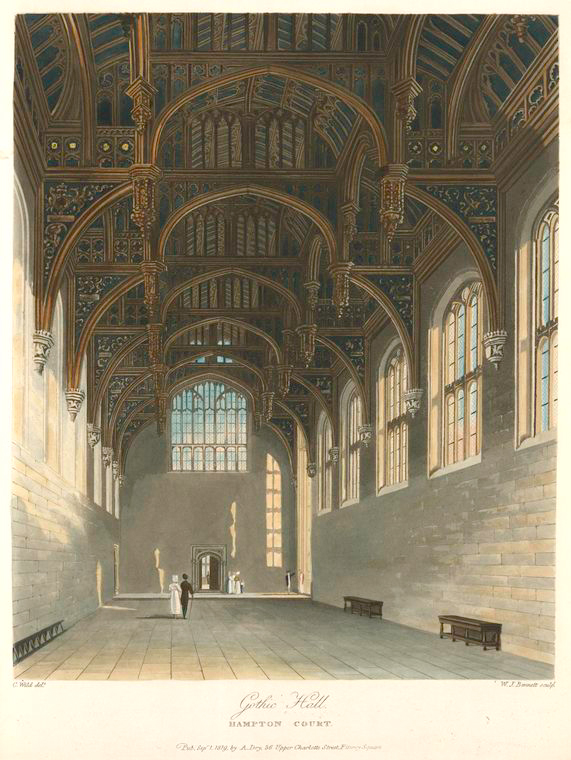
c. 1817, facing east, following James Wyatt's clearance

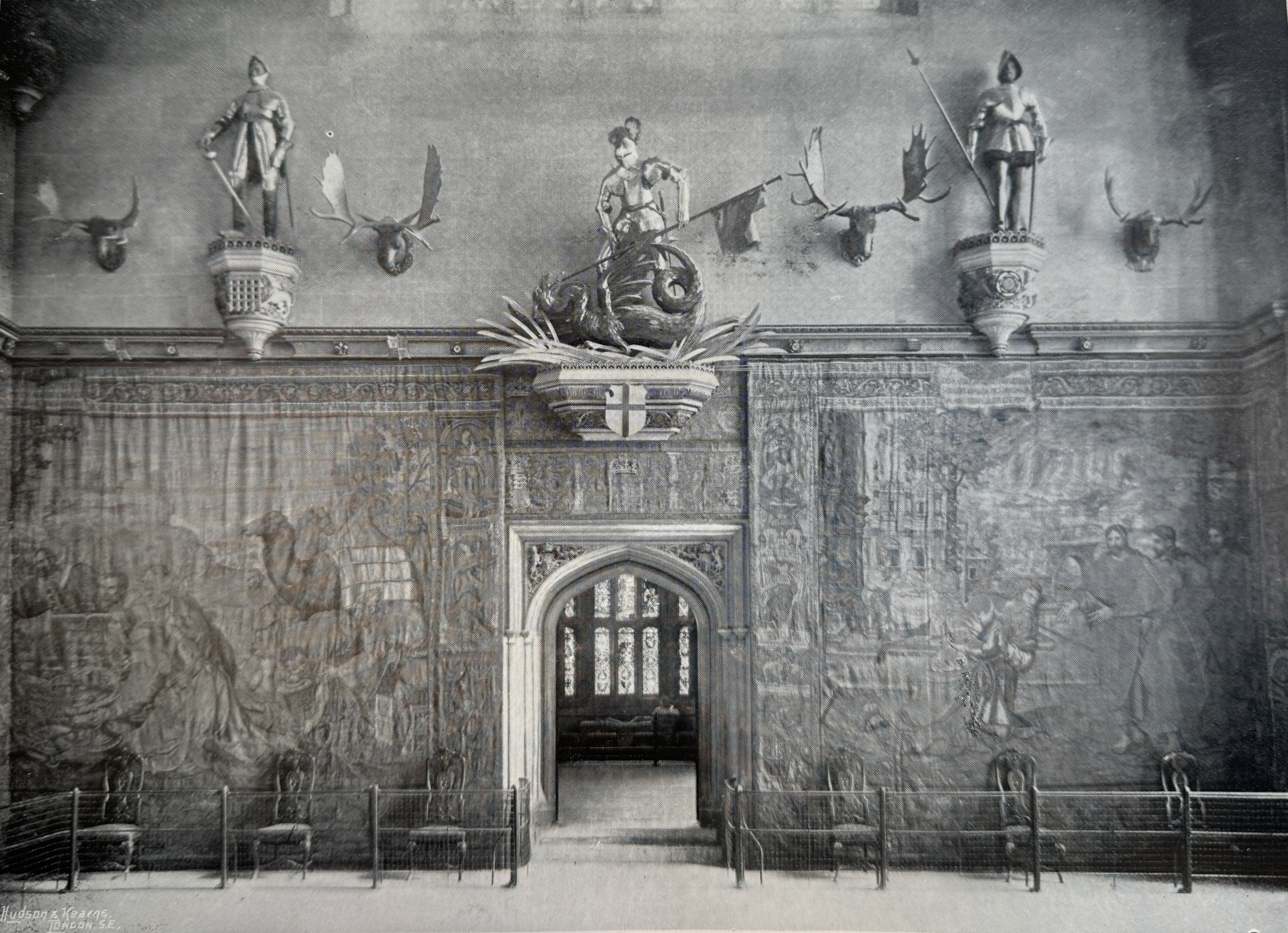
c. 1897, facing east, showing the entrance to the Great Watching Chamber, after Jesse's restoration

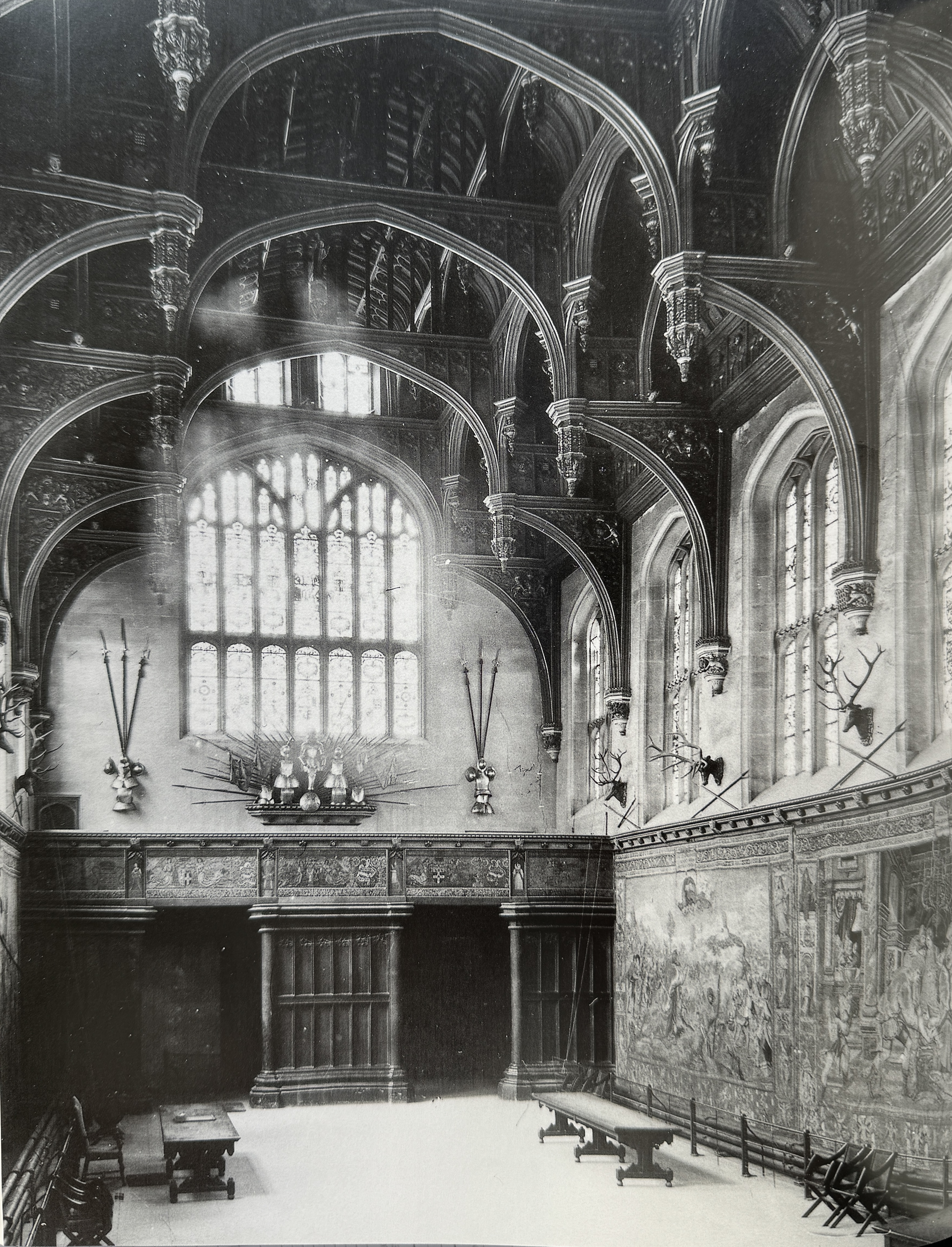
c. 1890, facing west, after Jesse's restoration

The Great Hall before and after Jesse's restoration

Informed by research of the original building accounts, (Note: Evidenced by additions made by Jesse to the 5th edition of A Summer's Day at Hampton Court (published 1842).) Jesse undertook a second phase of restorative works in 1844, which included the painting of the hammerbeam roof members in bright shades of white, vermillion, blue and green, and gilding the heraldic badges in gold. (Note: Jesse cited references to payments made in 1575 to a workman named George Gower for 'stopping, priminge, and paintinge with sondrie colours' the timbers of the Great Hall.)

==== Thomas Willement stained glass commission ====
Jesse also commissioned stained glass artist Thomas Willement to chart the Tudor history of the Palace in a series of windows on all sides of the Hall and the Great Watching Chamber. The west window, relating to Henry's wives and family, provides a full-length portrait of Henry VIII beneath a canopy of state and his arms, cyphers and badges. Alongside Henry are the arms, devices and mottoes of each his wives, and beneath him those of his children Edward VI, Queen Mary and Queen Elizabeth. The two small gable windows above show the arms of the Order of St John of Jerusalem (the original owners of the Manor of Hampton), Lord Thomas Docwra (who leased the Manor to Thomas Wolsey), the Archbishopric of York and Cardinal Wolsey. The east window is dedicated to Henry's lineage, showing Henry surrounded by the arms and badges of John Duke of Somerset, Margaret of Richmond, Henry VII, Elizabeth of York, Edward IV, Richard Duke of York, John Earl of Somerset, John Duke of Lancaster, Edmond Duke of York and Richard of Cambridge.

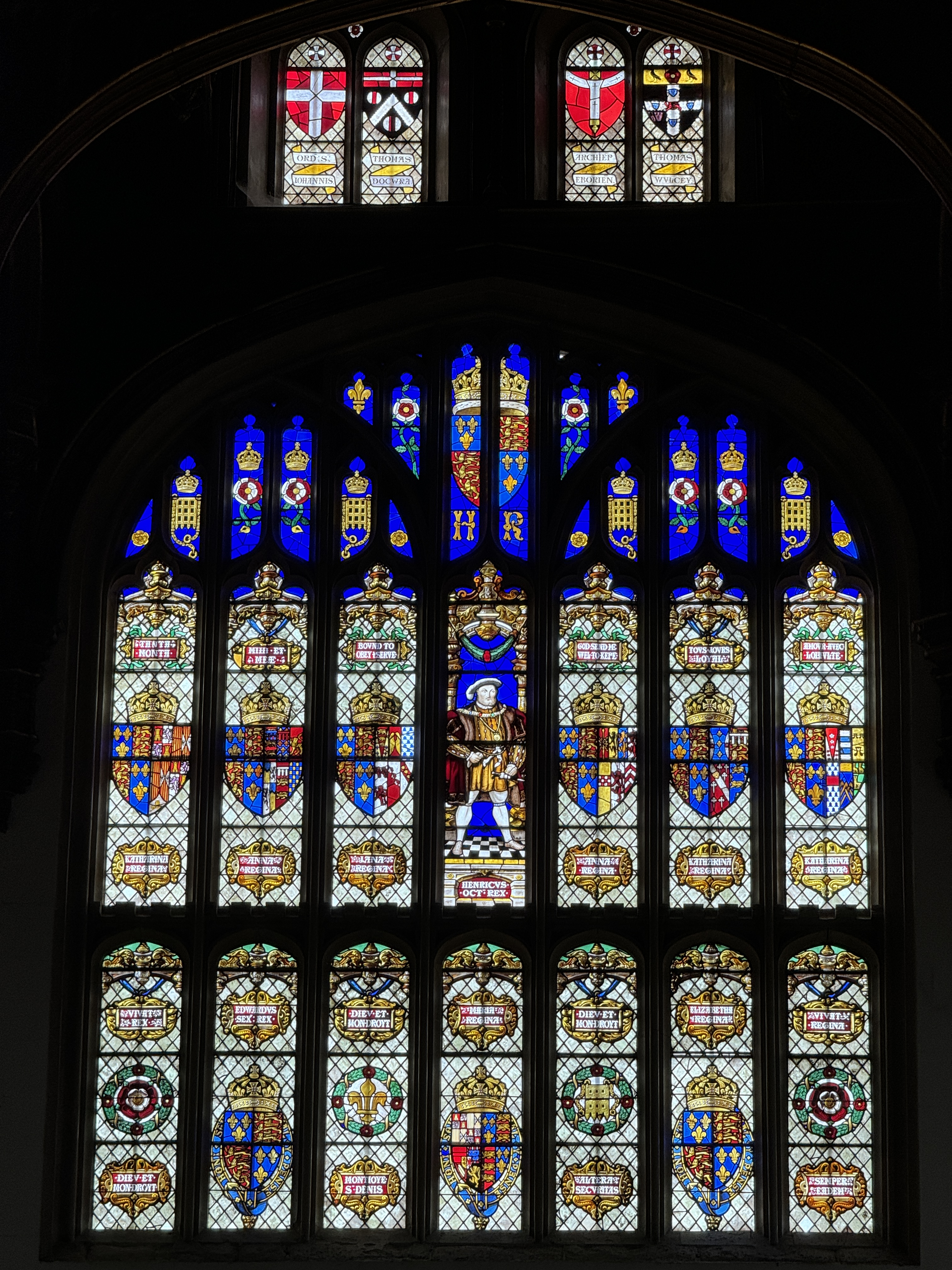
Great Hall West Window, setting out Henry VIII's family

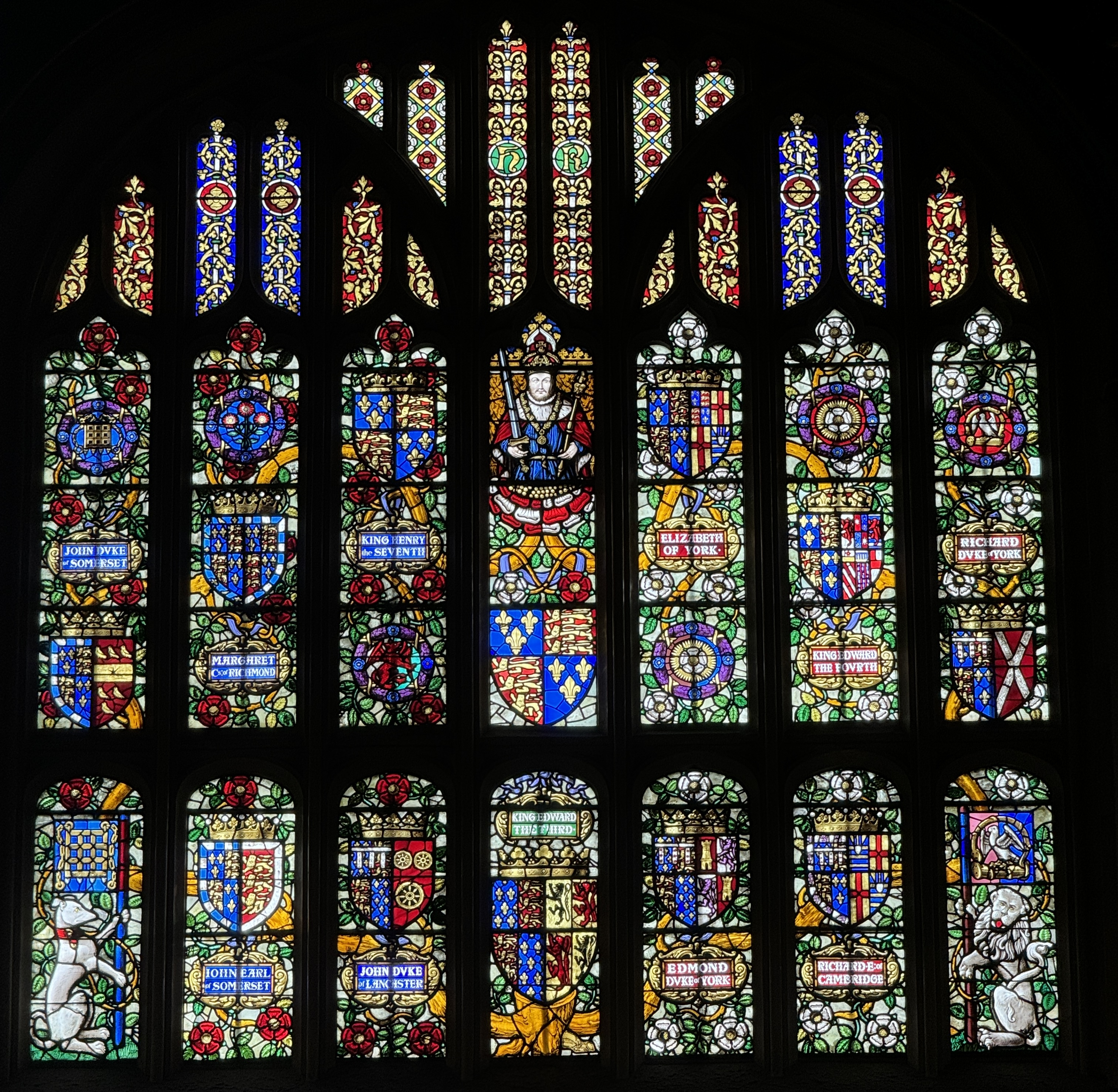
Great Hall East Window, setting out Henry VIII's lineage

Williment also set out the line of descent of each of Henry VIII's wives in alternate windows on the north and south sides of the Hall.

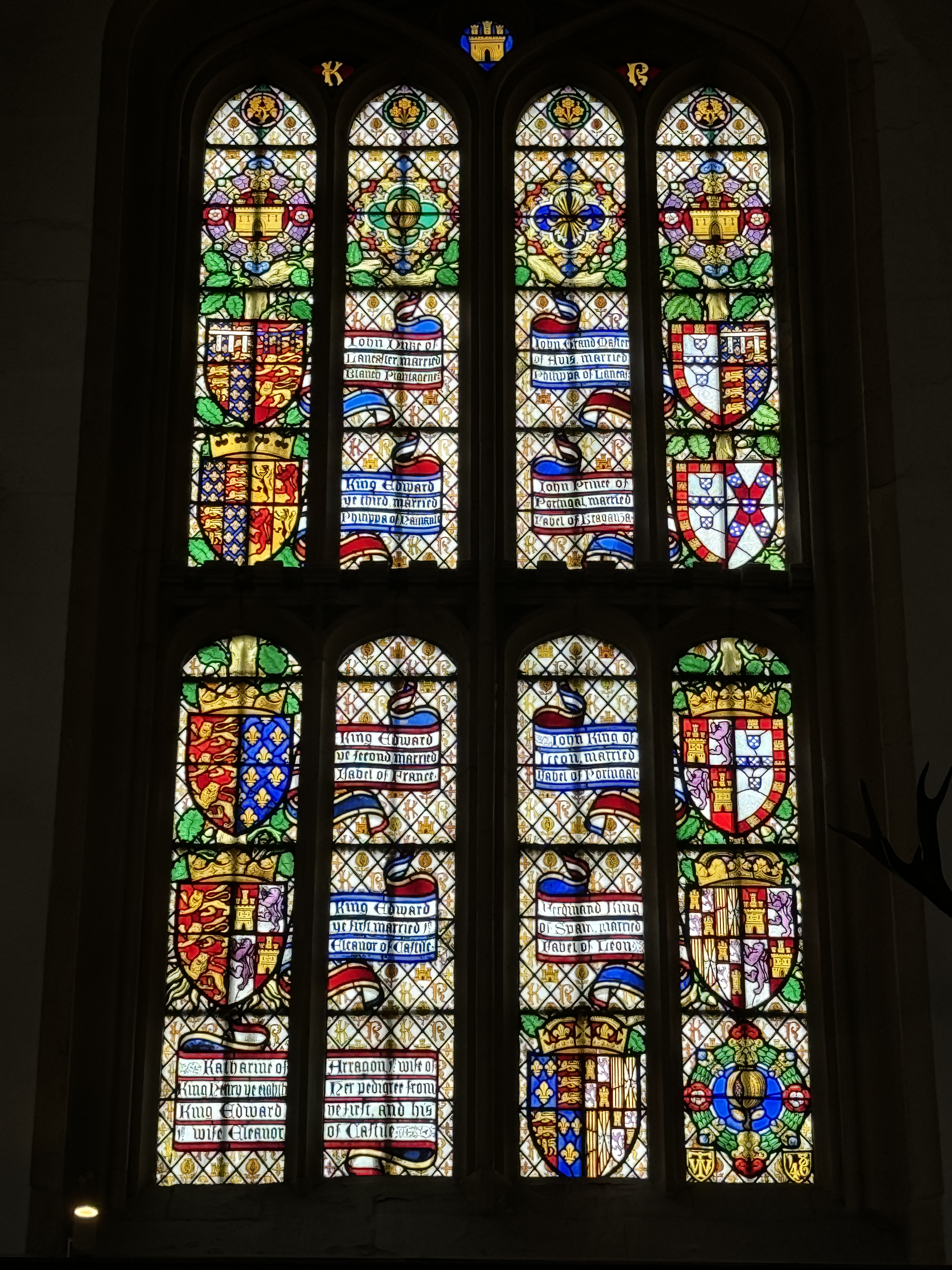
"Katharine of Arragon"

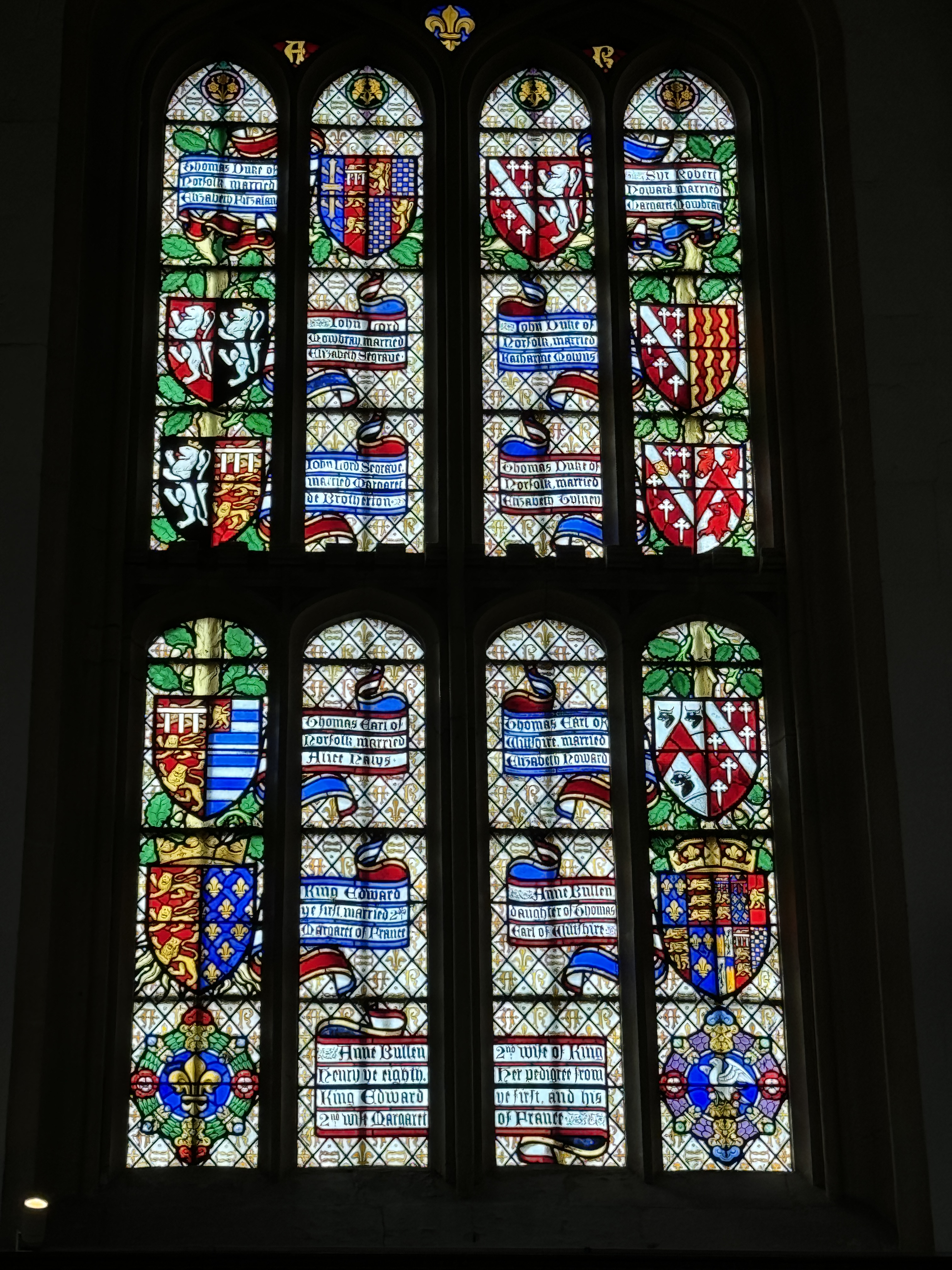
"Anne Bullen"

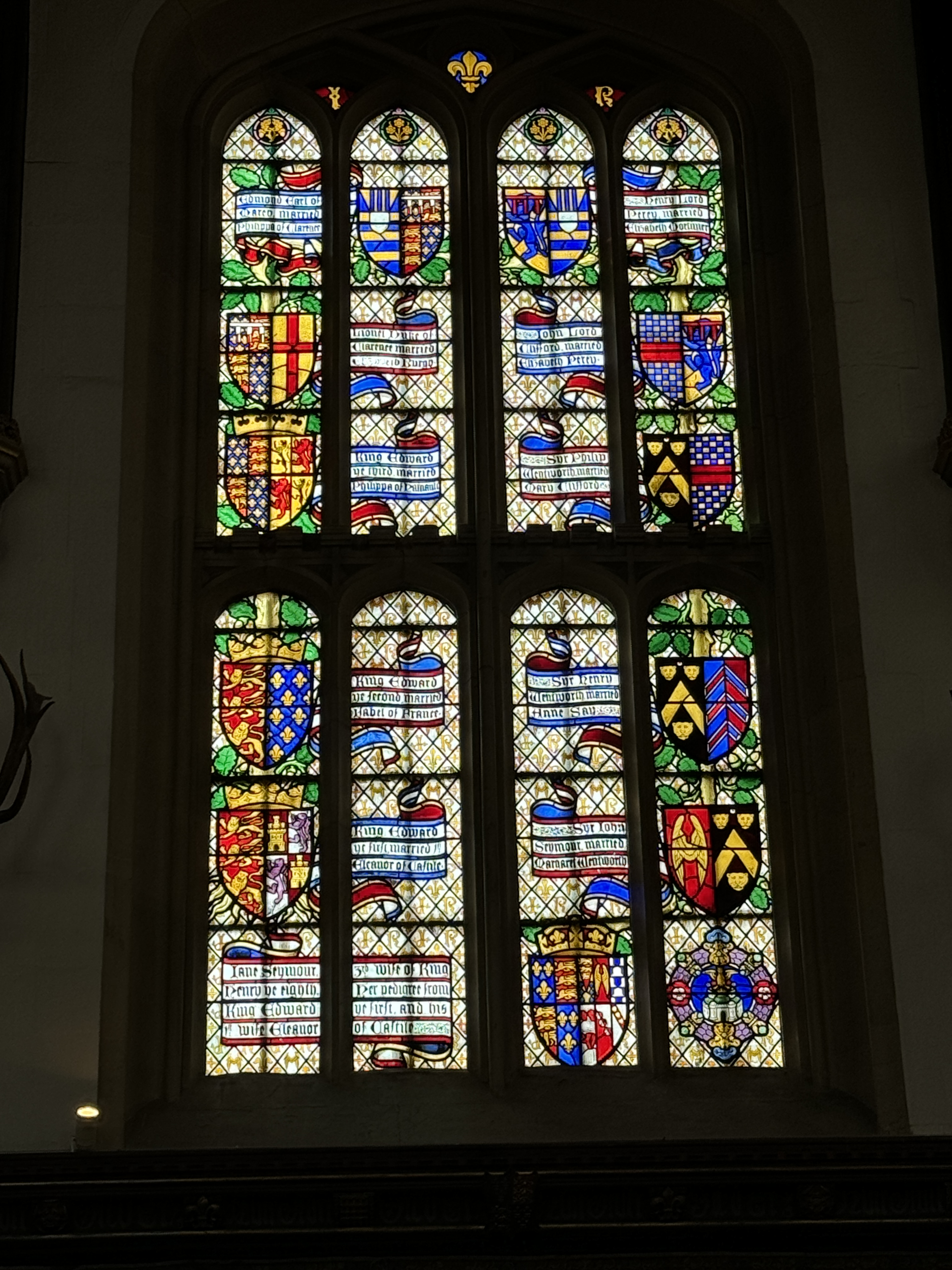
"Jane Seymour"

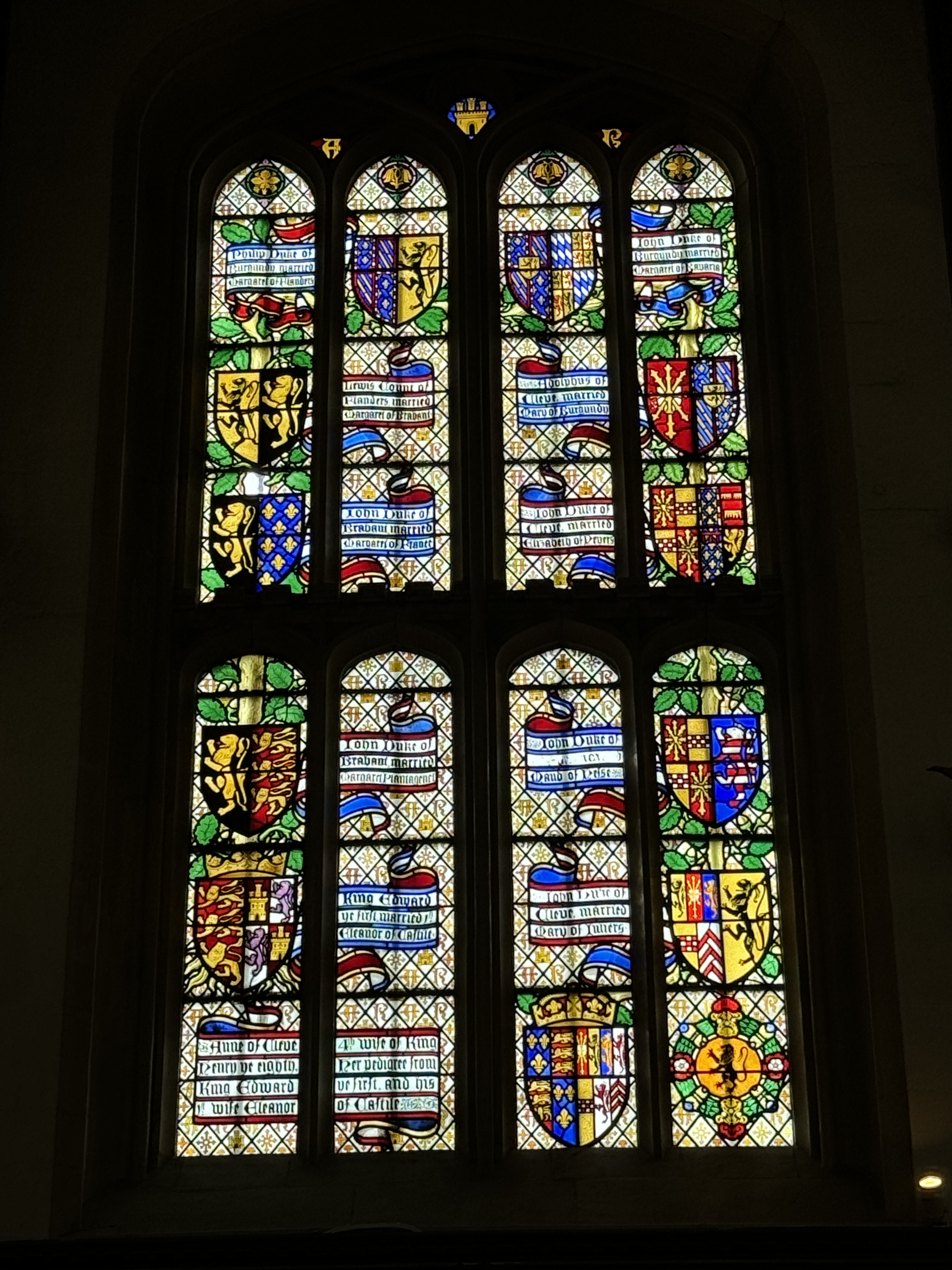
"Anne of Cleve"

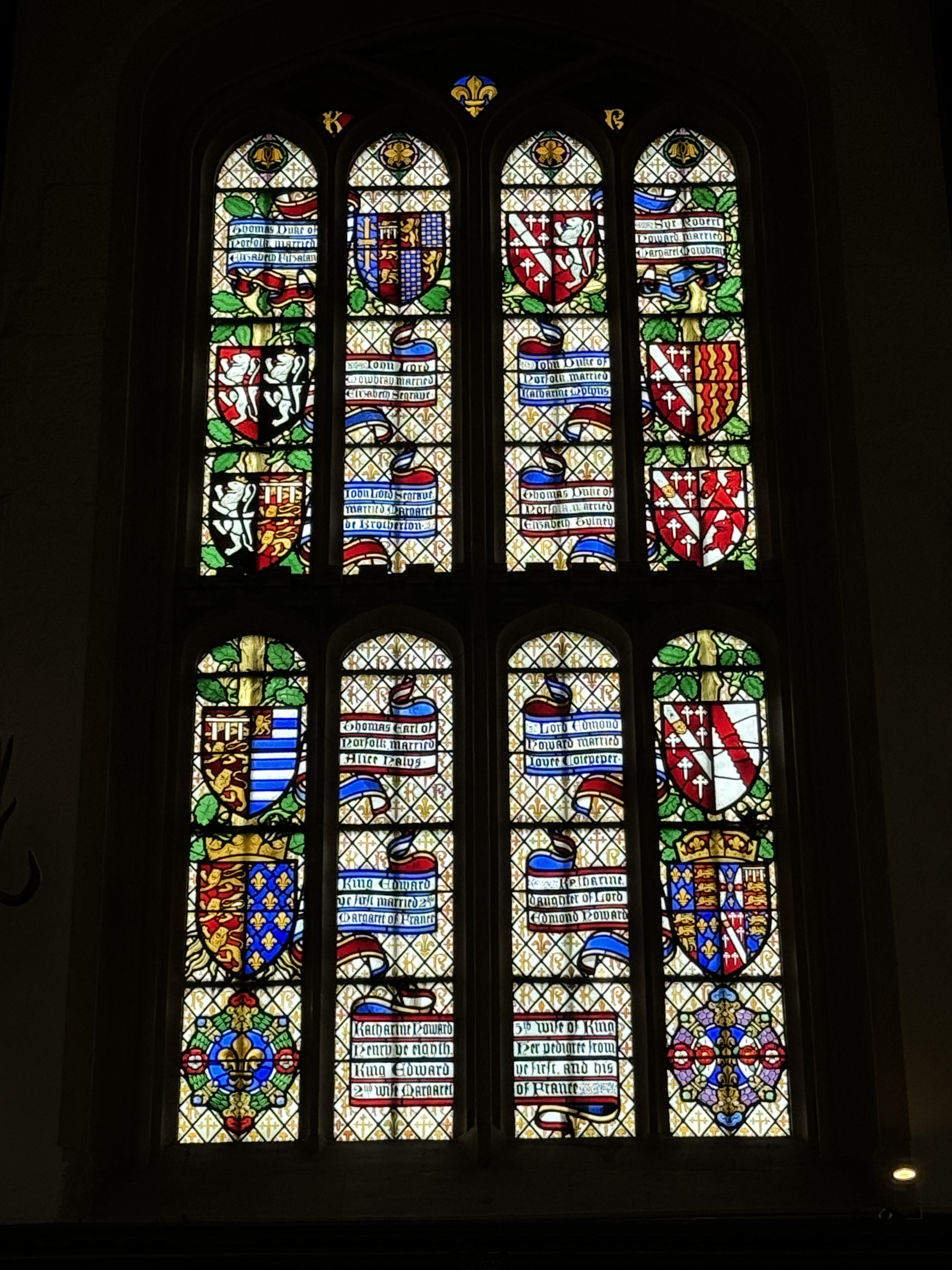
"Katherine Howard"

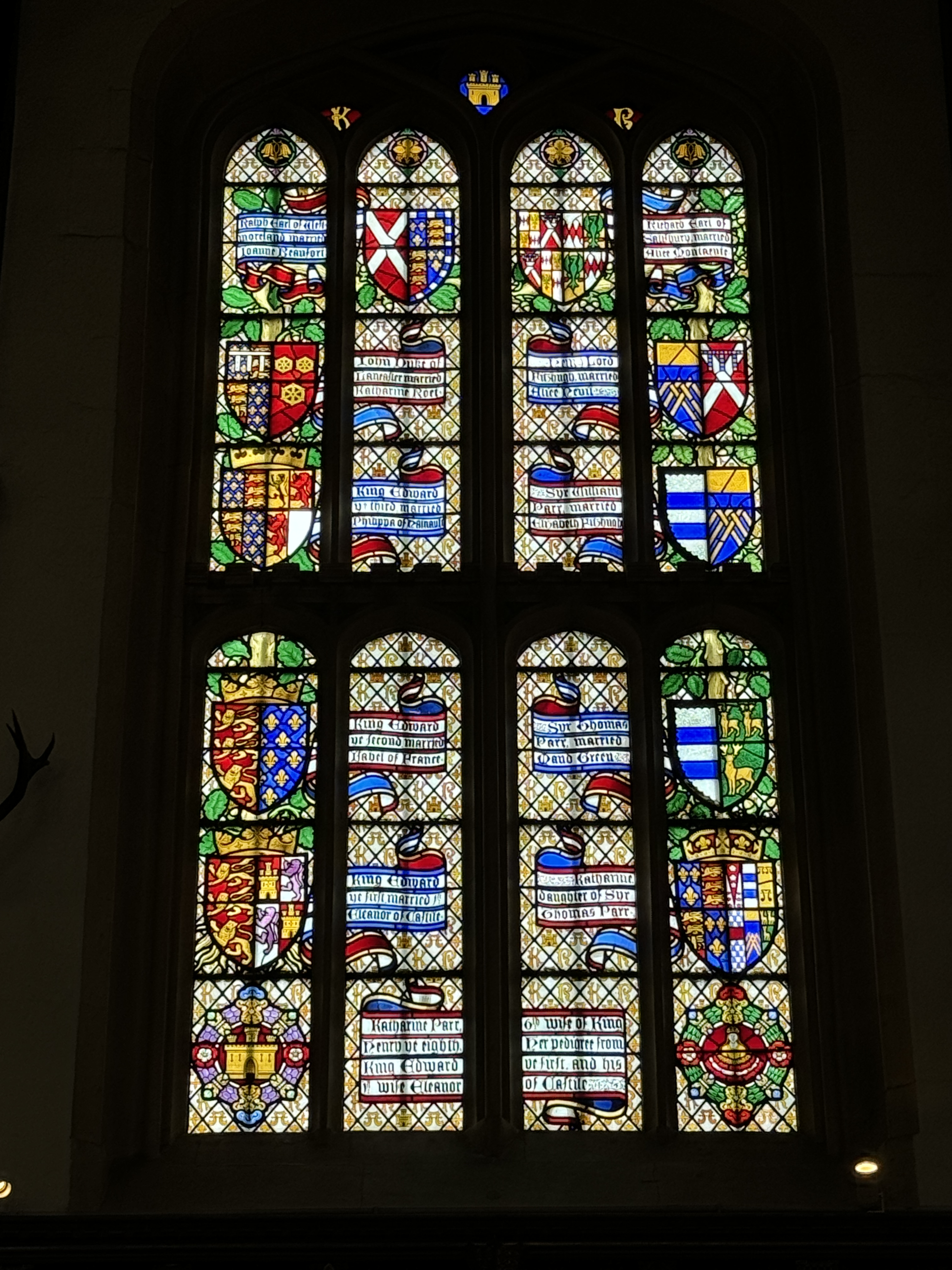
"Katharine Parr"

Stained glass windows presenting the lineage of each of Henry VIII's wives, installed by Thomas Willement

==== Criticism and legacy ====
Jesse's restoration of the Great Hall was the subject of both contemporary criticism (on the grounds of aesthetics and historical authenticity) and praise (for the vivid presentation of context, colour and armour). Henry Cole (Note: Then director of the South Kensington Museum and writing under his pseudonym Felix Summerly.) wrote "[the] effect would have been far more satisfactory if the judgment of the decorator had been as good as his intention," yet despite the incongruous juxtaposition of disparate Tudor actors and symbolism in Willement's windows, "the restoration of the coloured glass ... is most welcome, and characteristic of old times." Jesse's arrangement of the Great Hall continued to be presented until 1925, and Willement's stained glass remains in place today.

Jesse's presentation of the Great Hall has since been described as "one of the great Romantic interiors of the mid-nineteenth century". Jesse himself has been described as "both the first curator and the first interpreter of Hampton Court Palace," and "a forerunner to the HRP (Note: Historic Royal Palaces) Conservation and Learning Department".

== Bibliography ==
=== Natural history ===
Jesse, Edward (1832). Gleanings in Natural History (1st ed.). London: John Murray.

Jesse, Edward (1836). An Angler's Rambles. London: John van Voorst.

Jesse, Edward (1844). Scenes and Tales from Country Life. London: John Murray.

Jesse, Edward (1846). Anecdotes of Dogs. London: Richard Bentley.

Jesse, Edward (1861). Lectures on Natural History. London: L. Booth.

==== As editor ====
White, Gilbert; Jardine, William (1854). Jesse, Edward (ed.). The Natural History of Selbourne. London: Henry G. Bohn.

Walton, Izaak; Cotton, Charles (1856). Jesse, Edward (ed.). The Complete Angler. London: Henry G. Bohn.

=== Guide books ===
Jesse, Edward (1839). A Summer's Day at Hampton Court (1st ed.). London: John Murray.

Jesse, Edward (1841a). A Summer's Day at Windsor, and a Visit to Eton. London: John Murray.

Jesse, Edward (1847). Favorite Haunts and Rural Studies; Including Visits to Spots of Interest in the Vicinity of Windsor and Eton. London: John Murray.

Ritchie, Leitch; Jesse, Edward (1848). Windsor Castle, and its Environs (2nd ed.). London: Henry G. Bohn.

== Notes and references ==
=== Sources ===
Bettany, G. T.; Goldbloom, Alexander (23 September 2004). "Jesse, Edward (1780–1868), writer on natural history.". Oxford Dictionary of National Biography.

Davis, John R. (2024). "An Act of 'Queenly Beneficence'? A Historical Investigation of the Opening of Hampton Court Palace to the Public in the Nineteenth Century". The Court Historian. 29 (1): 17–32. doi:10.1080/14629712.2024.2321780.

Houstoun, Matilda Charlotte (1889). Silvanus Redivivus. London.

Jesse, Edward (1841). A Summer's Day at Hampton Court (4th ed.). London: John Murray, Albemarle Street.

Jesse, Edward (1842). A Summer's Day at Hampton Court (5th ed.). London: John Murray, Albemarle Street.

Lipscomb, Suzannah (Summer 2010). "Historical Authenticity and Interpretative Strategy at Hampton Court Palace". The Public Historian. 32 (3): 98–119. doi:10.1525/tph.2010.32.3.98.

Parker, Julia (2009). Reinvention and continuity in the making of an historic visitor attraction: control access and display at Hampton Court Palace,1838–1938 (PhD thesis). Kingston University, London.

Summerly, Felix (1843). A Handbook for the Architecture, Tapestries, Paintings, Gardens and Grounds of Hampton Court (2nd ed.). London: Bell and Daldy.

Thurley, Simon (2003). Hampton Court: A Social and Architectural History. London: Yale University Press. ISBN 0300102232.

Worsley, Lucy; Souden, David (2005). Hampton Court Palace: the official illustrated history. London: Merrell. ISBN 9781858942827.
