= Moussa Ayoub =

Syrian-British portrait painter (c.1873–1955)

M. Moussa Ayoub (c.1873–1955) was a Syrian-born British artist known for his portraits. He was an active painter in London and Paris between 1903 until 1938.

== About ==
He was born 1873 in Damascus, Syria, during the time of Ottoman Syria. Ayoub studied with painter Jean-Paul Laurens in Paris. They naturalized to the United Kingdom in July 1907. It has been assumed he worked as one of the art copiest team, under artist Luke Fildes. Moussa Ayoub died on 15 June 1955 in London.

His art work in various public museum collections including Princeton University Art Museum, Science Museum Group, Frogmore Paper Mill, Government Art Collection, University College London Art Museum (UCL), Hunterian Museum, Windsor Guildhall, and Royal Collection Trust.
