= John Heneage Jesse =

English historian

John Heneage Jesse (1809 – 7 July 1874), English historian, son of Edward Jesse, was educated at Eton and became a clerk in the secretary's department of the Admiralty.

His poem on Mary, Queen of Scots was published about 1831, and was followed by a collection of poems entitled Tales of the Dead. He also wrote a drama, Richard III, and a fragmentary poem entitled London. None of these ventures achieved any success, but his numerous historical works are written with vivacity and interest, and, in their own style, are an important contribution to the history of England.

They include:

- Memoirs of the Court of England during the Reign of the Stuarts (1840)
- Memoirs of the Court of England from the Revolution of 1688 to the Death of George II (1843)
- George Selwyn and his Contemporaries (1843, new ed. 1882)
- Memoirs of the Pretenders and their Adherents (1845)
- Memoirs of Richard the Third and his Contemporaries (1861)
- Memoirs of the Life and Reign of King George the Third (1867)

The titles of these works are sufficiently indicative of their character. They are sketches of the principal personages and of the social details of various periods in the history of England rather than complete and comprehensive historical narratives.

In addition to these works Jesse wrote Literary and Historical Memorials of London (1847), London and its Celebrities (1850), and a new edition of this work as London: its Celebrated Characters and Remarkable Places (1871). His Memoirs of Celebrated Etonians appeared in 1875.

A collected edition containing most of his works in thirty volumes was published in London in 1901.

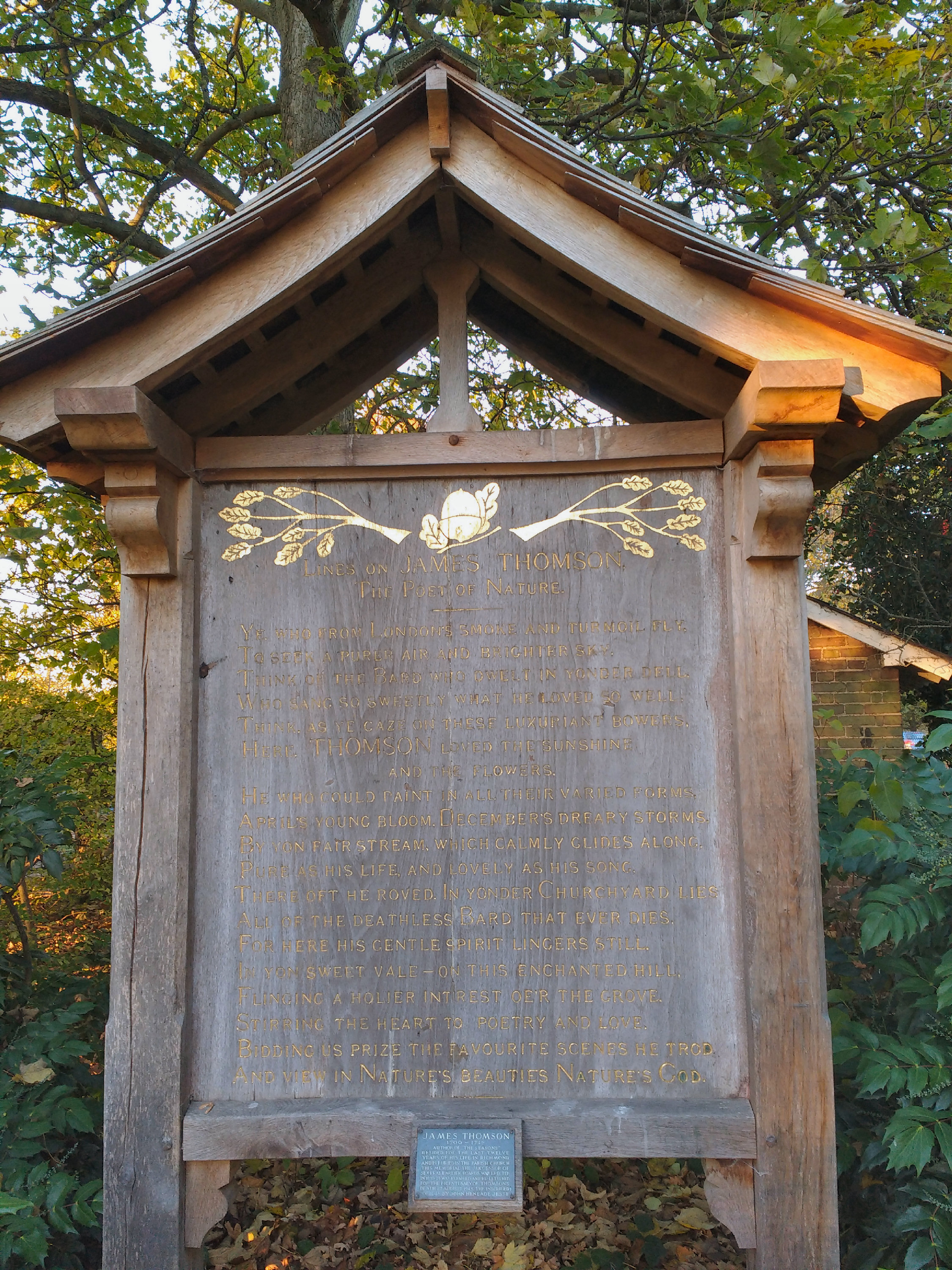
Board for James Thomson (1700-1748) in Poet's Corner, Pembroke Lodge Garden, Richmond Park, with lines written by John Heneage Jesse

In Richmond Park's Pembroke Lodge gardens, there is a memorial to the poet James Thomson, who died at Richmond in 1748. This is a black wooden board with a poem about Thomson by John Heneage Jesse.
