= Georgiana Leicester, Baroness de Tabley =

(1794–1859), Wife of 1st Baron De Tabley

The Right Honourable The Baroness de Tabley
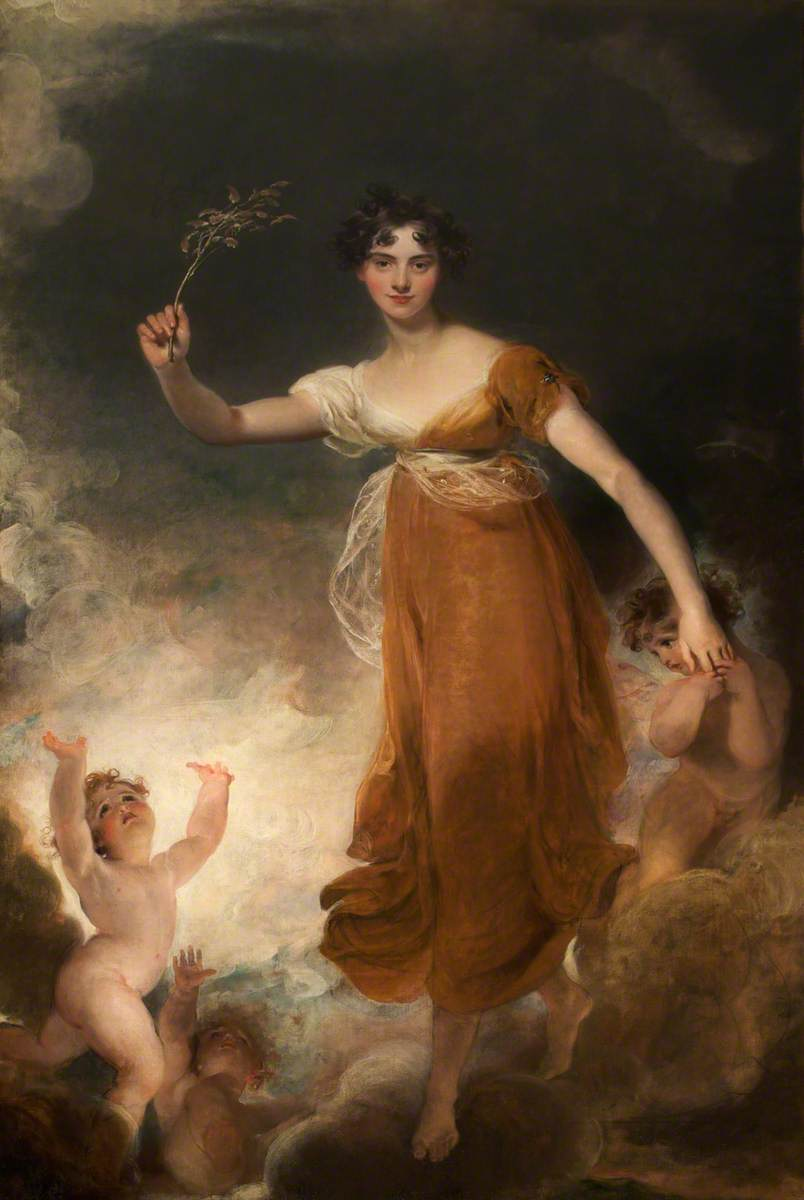
- Georgiana, Lady Leicester, (later Lady De Tabley), portrait as "Hope"/The Branch by Sir Thomas Lawrence (c. 1811)
- Born: Georgiana Mary Cottin; 28 February 1794; London, England
- Died: 5 November 1859 (aged 65); Brighton, England
- Other name: Lady De Tabley
- Occupation: Aristocrat
- Spouse(s): John Leicester, 1st Baron de Tabley (1810–1827; his death); Frederick Leicester (m. 1828)
- Children: George Warren, 2nd Baron de Tabley
- Parent(s): Josiah Cottin; Lavinia Chambers

Georgiana Maria Leicester, (Note: also known as Georgina Mary) Lady de Tabley (née Cottin, 1794–1859) was an English aristocrat, and the wife of John Leicester, 1st Baron de Tabley. Married in 1810, the couple resided at the Leicester country estate Tabley House in Cheshire, where they raised two sons. Following Lord de Tabley's death in 1827, Lady Georgina formed a close relationship with her late husband's nephew, Reverend Frederick Leicester, who had recently joined the household as a clergyman. Their controversial decision to marry him in 1828, at a time when aunt-nephew unions were prohibited by the Church of England, ignited scandal but did not permanently damage Lady Georgina's standing among the aristocracy. She retained the title of Lady De Tabley until she died in 1859.

== Early life and first marriage ==
Georgiana Mary Cottin was born on February 28, 1794, in London to Josiah Cottin, a captain in the 10th Light Dragoons, and Lavinia Cottin (née Chambers). Her father was descended from a French Huguenot family and her mother was the daughter of Sir William Chambers, architect to King George III. At her christening, her godparents were the Prince Regent (later King George IV) and Maria Fitzherbert.

On November 10, 1810, at age 16, Georgina married baronet Sir John Fleming Leicester at Hampton Court Palace. They settled at Tabley House, her husband's estate in Cheshire, and had two sons - George (b. 1817) and William (b. 1819). Her husband was created Baron de Tabley on 16 July 1826, at which time she became a baroness.

== Second marriage and scandal ==
After Lord de Tabley died in 1827, Georgina stayed briefly with her widowed sister-in-law Mrs Charles Leicester. Rumors soon emerged of a romance between Georgina and Charles' son, Reverend Frederick Leicester, who had recently become domestic chaplain to Georgina's elder son George.

Georgina and Frederick shocked society by marrying on July 10, 1828, in an unknown location. As the Church of England prohibited aunt-nephew marriages, Frederick resigned from his post to avoid expulsion. The union forfeited £500 of Georgina's annual £1,500 widow's jointure.

News of Lady De Tabley and Reverend Leicester's marriage quickly spread through British high society and became a subject of criticism and gossip among aristocratic circles. In a letter dated July 8, 1828, English politician and diarist Thomas Creevey wrote about hearing of the union to his stepdaughter. Creevey noted that the couple had sacrificed part of her (Georgiana) jointure and his (Frederick) clerical income by defying church prohibition against aunt-nephew unions.

He wrote:

"Dear Mr. and Mrs. Smythe Owen and I have lived in the most perfect harmony since 4 o'clock on Saturday afternoon, but other human being have I seen none, except the parson at church yesterday, whom I was in hopes to have seen more of. He is Mr. Leicester, nephew to the late Lord de Tabley. . . . Having known his father in the days of my youth at Cambridge as by far the most ultra and impertinent dandy of his day, I was curious to see the son. It was precisely the same thing over again. This beautiful youth (for such he is), aged 27, has been appointed by the Court of Chancery guardian to his nephew Lord de Tabley, aged 16. About 6 weeks ago, he was married to his aunt Lady de Tabley, who expects to be confined next month. I am sorry she is not [illegible] for this second marriage. On her part she forfeits £500 a year out of her jointure of £1500; and his diocesan, the Bishop of Lichfield, has given him notice he shall eject him from his living for marrying his aunt, which reduces his income to nothing. . . ."

== Later life ==
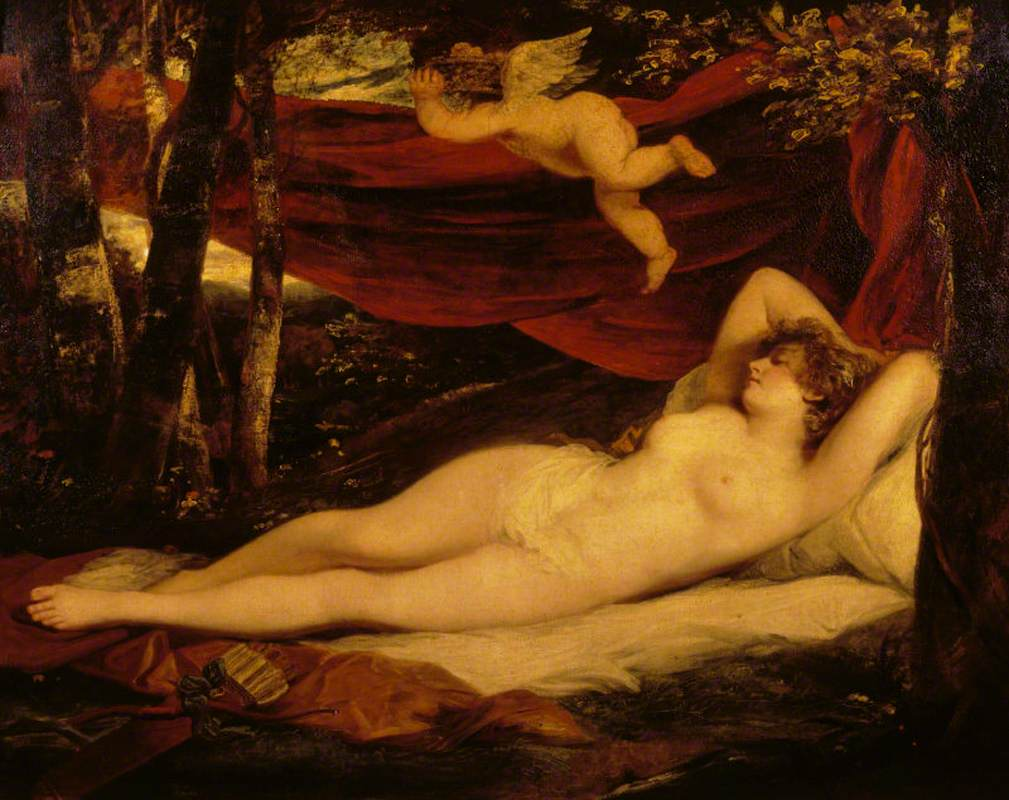
Sleeping Nymph and Cupid, by John Hoppner, now at Petworth House. The model for the nymph was said at the time to be Georgina Maria Cottin.

The couple weathered the scandal and remained together until Georgina's death on November 5, 1859, in Brighton. They lived in properties adjacent to her elder son George, 2nd Baron de Tabley. Though Frederick remarried after Georgina died, when he died in 1873, he was buried alongside her.
