= John Mitford =

John Mitford may refer to:

- John Mitford (Royal Navy officer), British naval officer and writer
- John Freeman-Mitford, 1st Baron Redesdale, known as Sir John Mitford between 1793 and 1802
- John Mitford (priest) (1781–1859), English man of letters
- John de Mitford, MP for Northumberland (UK Parliament constituency)

== See also ==
- John Freeman-Mitford (disambiguation)
