= John Freeman =

John Freeman may refer to:

== Politicians ==
- John Freeman (Australian politician) (1894–1970), Australian politician
- John Freeman (British politician) (1915–2014), British politician, broadcaster and television presenter
- John Freeman (Wyoming politician) (born 1954), member of the Wyoming House of Representatives
- John Bailey Freeman (1835–1890), Canadian politician
- John D. Freeman (1817–1886), U.S. representative from Mississippi

== Sportspeople ==
- John Freeman (cricketer) (1883–1958), English cricketer
- John Freeman (baseball) (1901–1958), American baseball player
- John Freeman (footballer) (born 2001), English footballer
- John Freeman (rugby) (1934–2017), Welsh rugby union and professional rugby league footballer
- John Childe-Freeman (born 1935), known as John Freeman, cricketer for Queensland
- John Ripley Freeman (1855–1932), American civil engineer
- Buck Freeman (John Frank Freeman, 1871–1949), American baseball player

== Writers and editors ==
- John Freeman (poet) (1880–1929), English poet
- John Freeman (1903–1950), pseudonymous author of essay "Can Socialists Be Happy?", now attributed to George Orwell
- John Freeman (editor) (born 1960), British writer and editor
- John Freeman (author) (born 1974), American literary critic and former editor of Granta

== Others ==
- John Freeman (painter), British painter
- John Freeman (VC) (1832–1913), British Army soldier, Victoria Cross recipient
- John Freeman (animator) (1916–2010), American character animator for Disney, Marvel Studios and others
- John M. Freeman (1933–2014), American pediatric neurologist
- John Freeman (trade unionist) (1933–2011), trade union leader from Northern Ireland
- John Freeman (diplomat) (born 1951), British diplomat, governor of Turks and Caicos Islands
- John Craig Freeman (born 1959), artist and professor of new media
- John Freeman, the fictional protagonist of the web series Half-Life: Full Life Consequences
- John Freeman, the name chosen by Edward Oxford (1822–1900) after his attempted regicide of Queen Victoria

== See also ==
- Jack Freeman (disambiguation)
- Jonathan Freeman (disambiguation)
- John Freeman-Mitford (disambiguation)
- Jonny Freeman, British actor and comedian
