= Gregory Byrne (disambiguation) =

Gregory Byrne is an American college athletic director.

Gregory Byrne may also refer to:

- Greg Byrne (born 1960), former politician in the province of New Brunswick, Canada
- Sir Gregory Byrne, 1st Baronet (died 1712), Irish Jacobite
