= George Warren, 2nd Baron de Tabley =

British nobleman and politician

The Right Honourable The Lord de Tabley PC
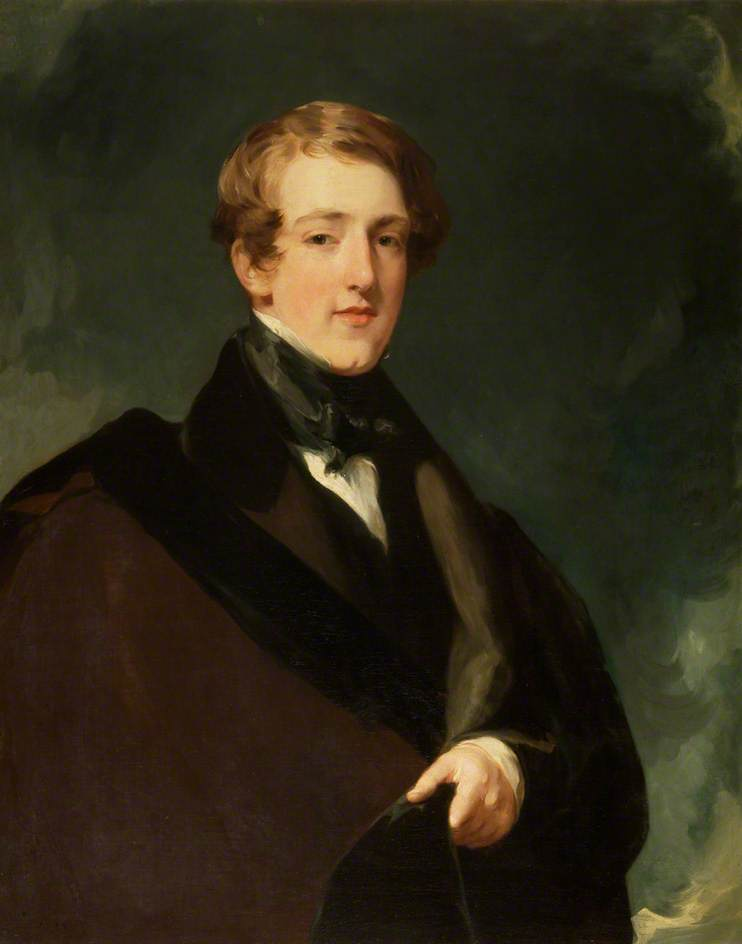
- Portrait by Margaret Sarah Carpenter, c.1830/32

Treasurer of the Household
- In office 12 December 1868 – 1 March 1872
- Monarch: Queen Victoria
- Prime Minister: William Ewart Gladstone
- Preceded by: Percy Egerton Herbert
- Succeeded by: The Lord Poltimore

Personal details
- Born: George Fleming Leicester; 28 October 1811
- Died: 19 October 1887 (aged 75)
- Party: Liberal
- Spouses: Catharina de Salis-Soglio (m. 1832; died 1869) Elizabeth Smith-Barry (m. 1871; died 1887)
- Education: Christ Church, Oxford

George Fleming Warren, 2nd Baron de Tabley PC (28 October 1811 – 19 October 1887) was a British Liberal politician. He notably served as Treasurer of the Household under William Ewart Gladstone between 1868 and 1872.

== Early life ==
Born George Fleming Leicester, he was the eldest son of John Leicester, 1st Baron de Tabley, by his wife Georgina Maria Cottin, daughter of Josiah Cottin, and a godson of George IV.

George was educated at Eton and Christ Church, Oxford. In 1832, he assumed by Royal licence the surname of Warren in lieu of Leicester under the terms of the will of his kinswoman Elizabeth Warren-Bulkeley (née Warren), Viscountess Bulkeley.

== Political career ==
Lord de Tabley succeeded in the barony on the death of his father in 1827. He sat on the Liberal benches in the House of Lords and served under successively Lord Aberdeen, Lord Palmerston and Lord Russell as a Lord-in-waiting (government whip in the House of Lords) between 1853 and 1858 and 1859 and 1866. In 1868 he was appointed Treasurer of the Household in the first Liberal administration of William Ewart Gladstone, a post he held until 1872, and was sworn of the Privy Council in 1869.

== Personal life ==
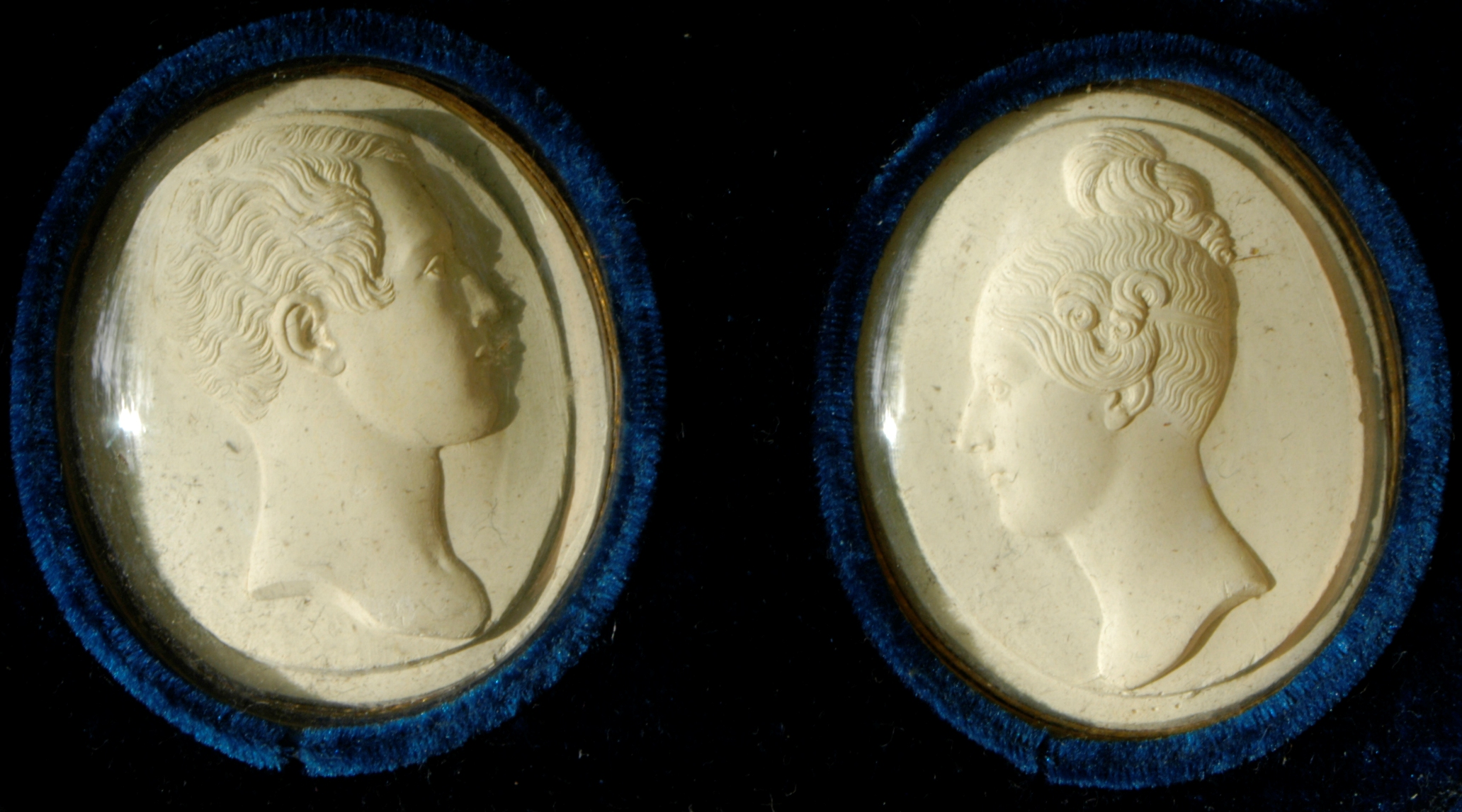
Plaster oval miniature reliefs of De Tabley and his wife Nina, circa 1833.

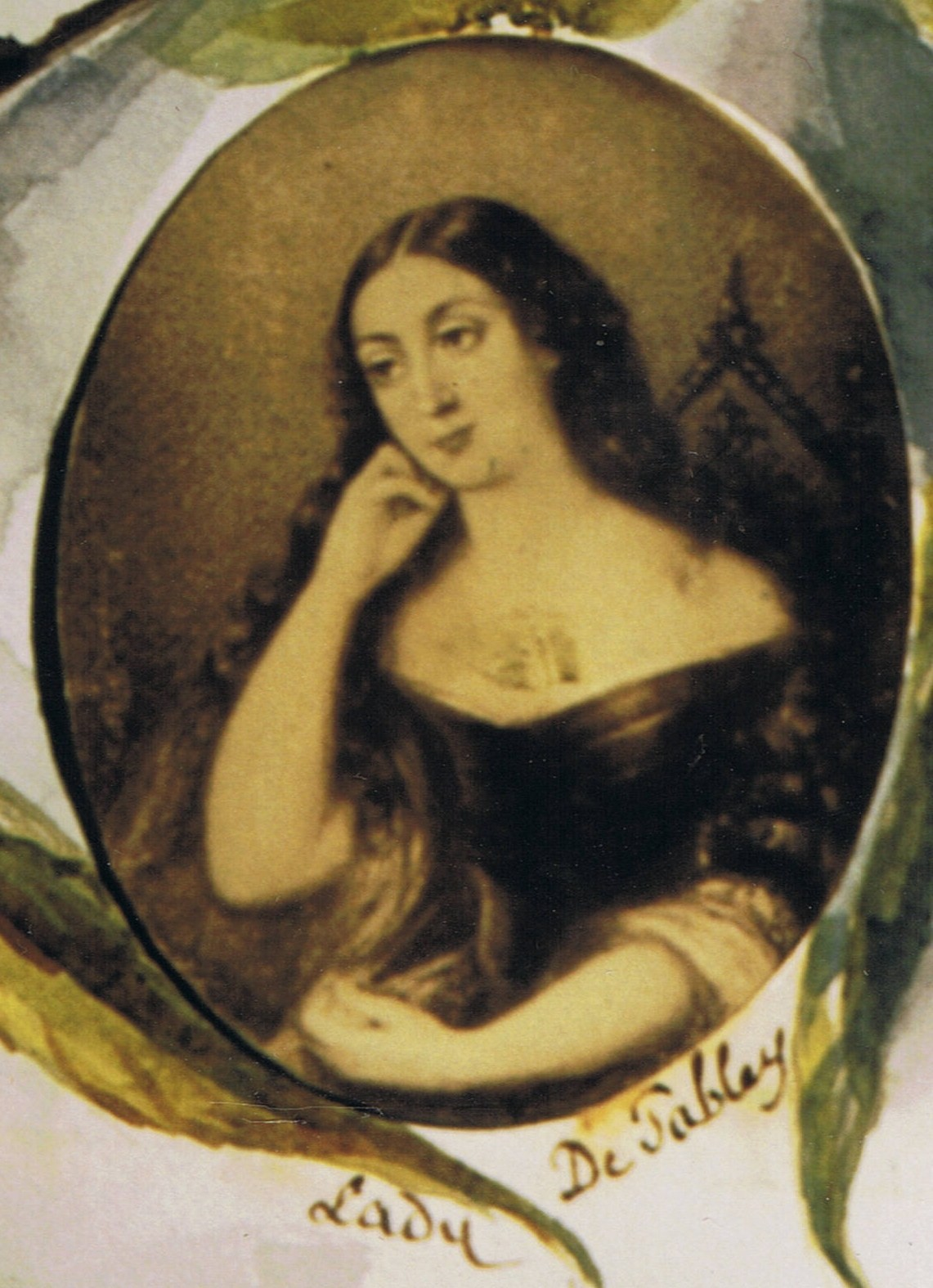
Miniature of Lady de Tabley, from an album made by her sister-in-law, Emily Fane de Salis

Lord de Tabley married Catharina Barbara 'Nina', daughter of Jerome, 4th Count de Salis-Soglio, in 1832. They had two sons and four daughters:

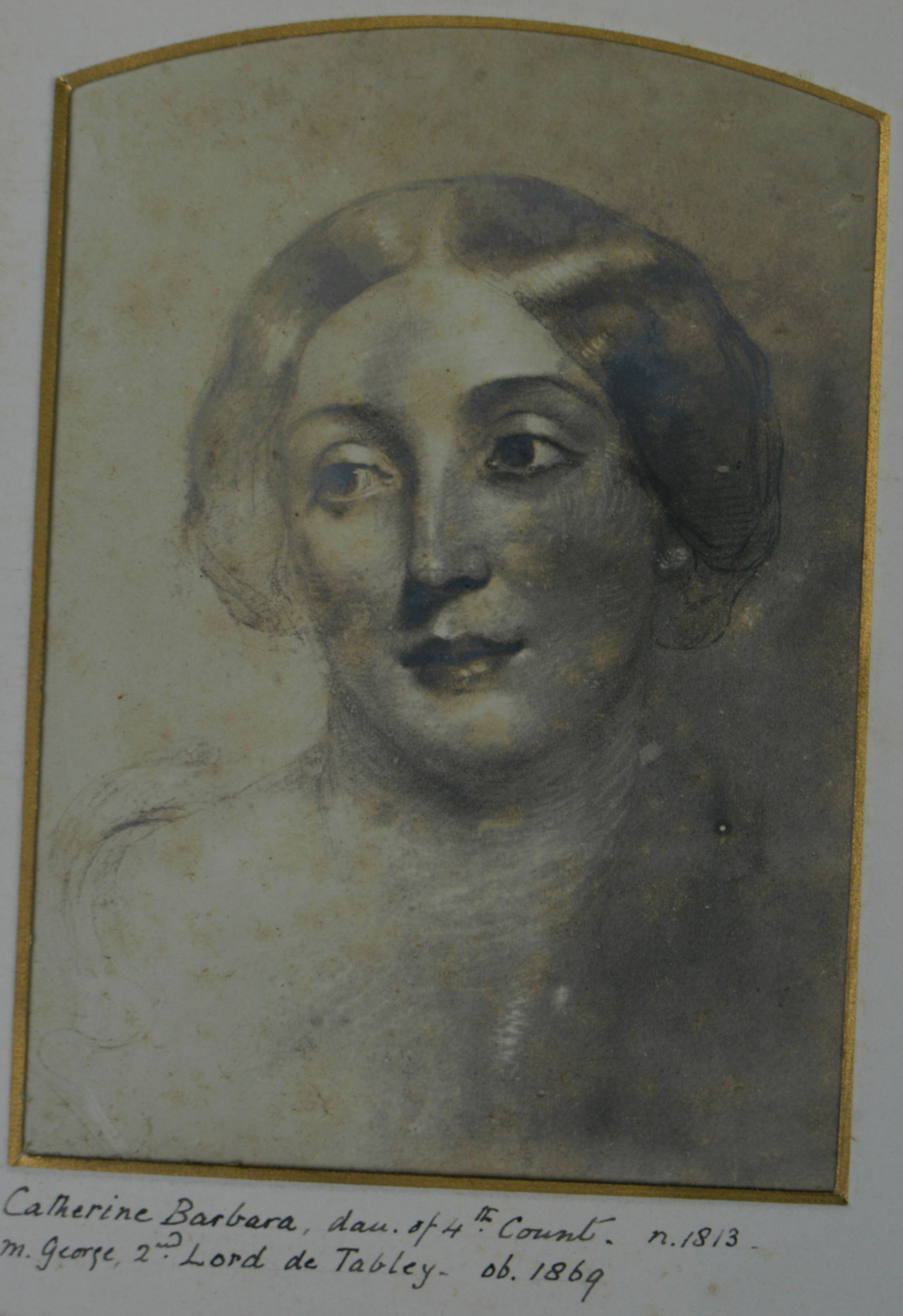
Catherine-Barbara, first wife to 2nd Lord De Tabley.

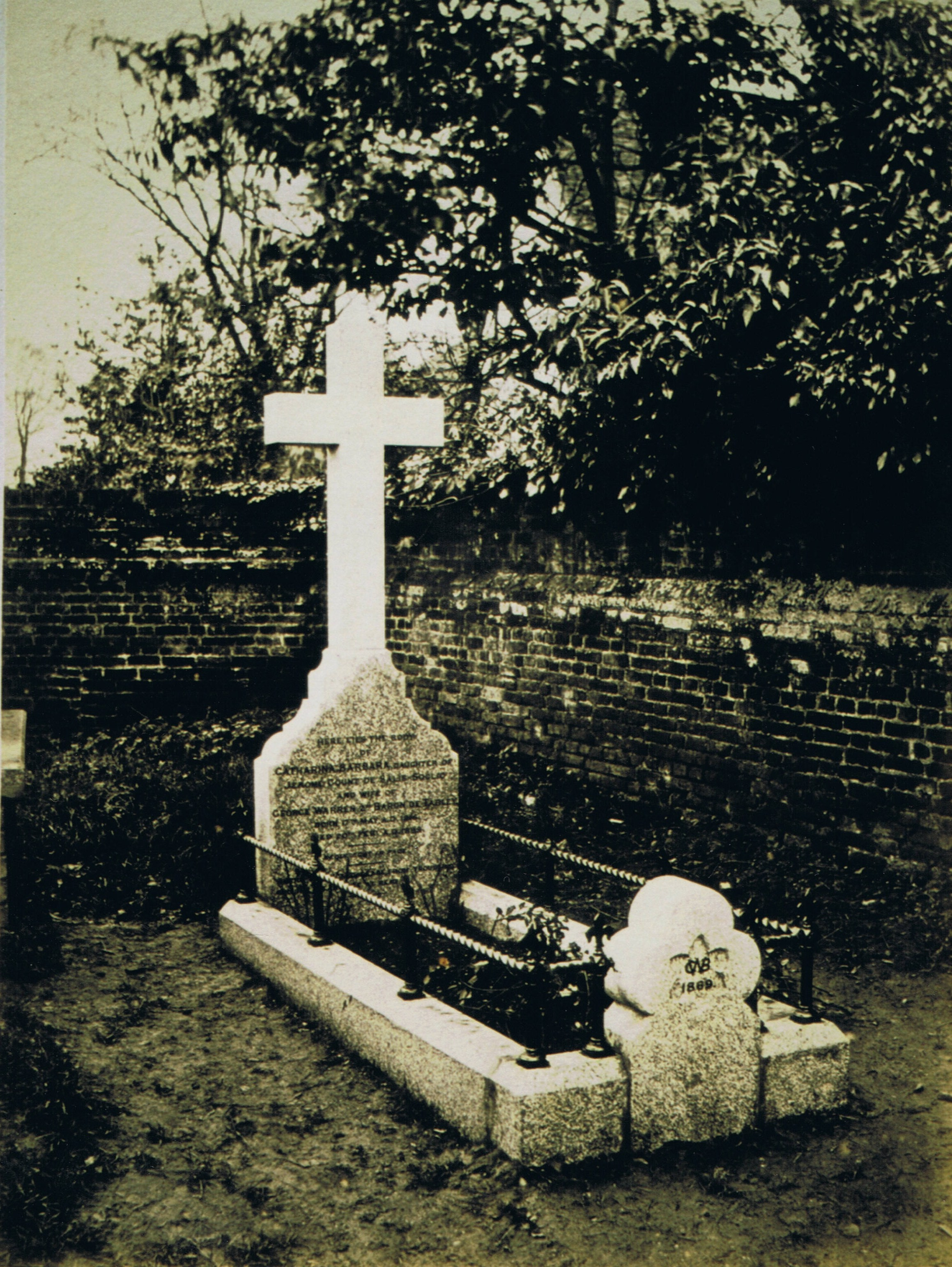
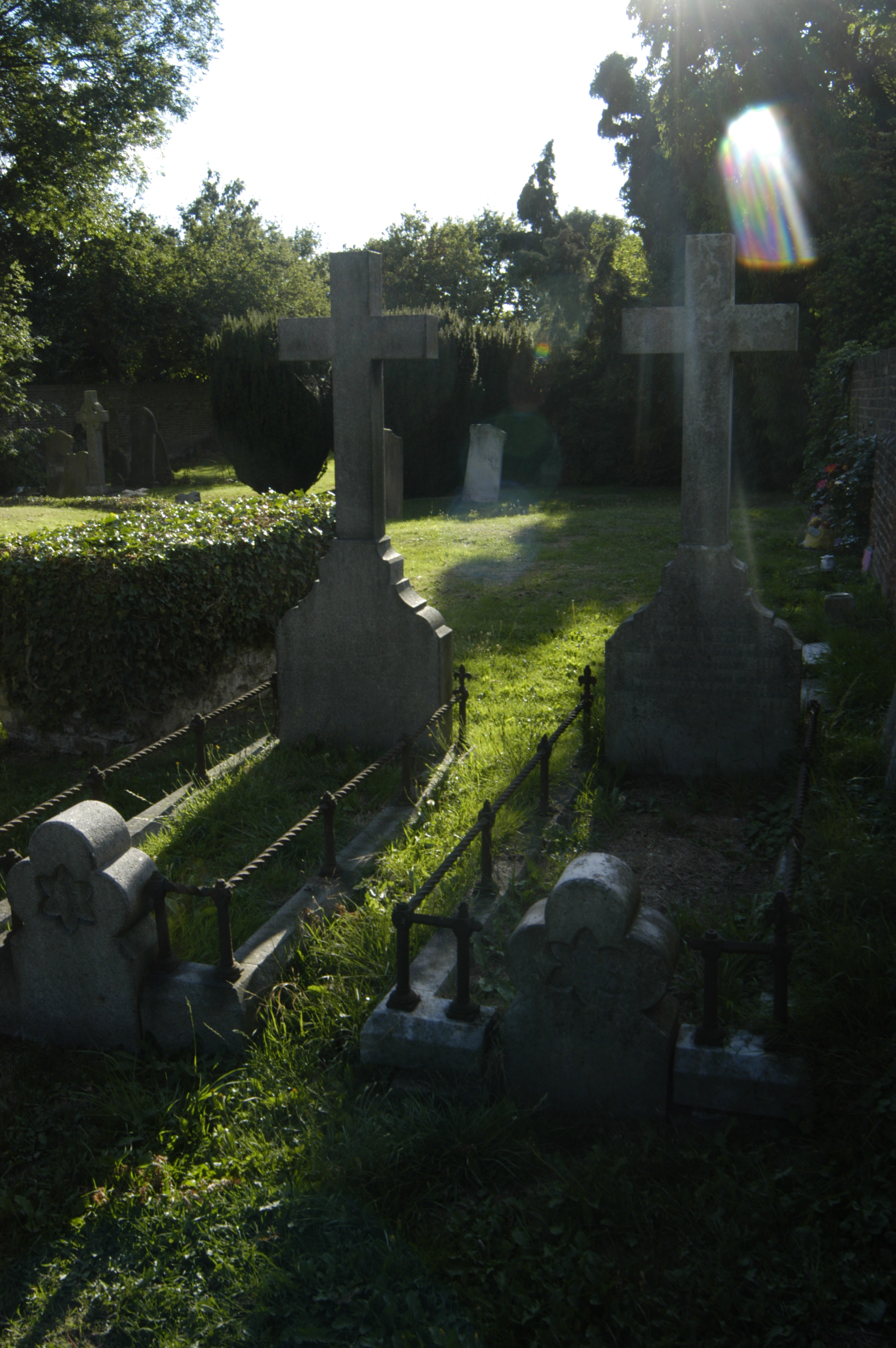
_{Tomb of Lady de Tabley (c. 1870) and that of her eldest daughter, Catharine, Harlington.}

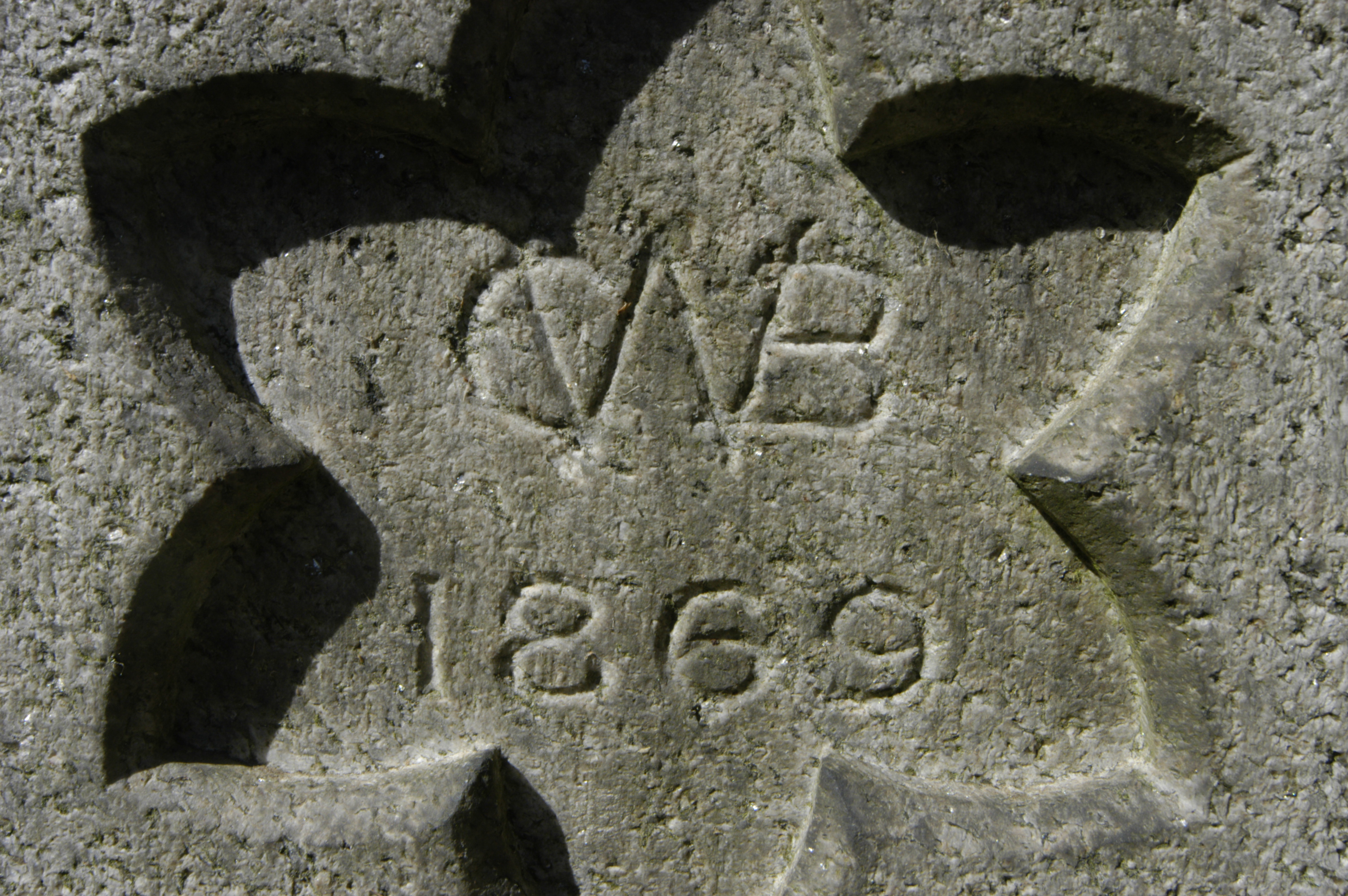
Lady De Tabley's monogramme on her gravestone at Harlington (2013). (CWB for Catherina Barbara Warren).

- John Byrne Leicester Warren, 3rd Baron de Tabley (1835–1895).
- Hon. Catharine Leicester (1838–1881). Buried Harlington, Middlesex, beside her mother. In 1884 the women's ward of the Harlington, Harmondsworth and Cranford Cottage Hospital was named after her.
- Hon. Meriel Warren (1839–72), married Allen Bathurst in 1862.
- Hon. Eleanor (1841-14 August 1914), married Sir Baldwyn Leighton, 8th Baronet (1836-2 January 1897), of Loton, Shropshire, in 1864. She was (eventual) heir to her brother in 1895, and in 1900 took the name Leighton-Warren. Barbara Sotheby (1870–1952), photographer and painter, was her daughter.
- Hon. Francis Peter Leicester Warren (1842–1845).
- Hon. Margaret Warren (1847–1921), married Arthur Cowell-Stepney, 2nd Baronet (aka Emile Algernon Arthur Keppel Cowell-Stepney) (1834–1909), of Llanelli, in 1875. Their daughter Catherine Muriel Cowell-Stepney (Miss Alcyone Stepney) (1876–1952), was painted by Sir John Everett Millais. She married Sir Stafford Howard in 1911.

Lady de Tabley died in 1869. Lord de Tabley subsequently married Elizabeth Smith-Barry (née Jacson) in 1871 but had no further children. He died in October 1887, aged 75, to be succeeded in his titles by his eldest and only surviving son, John.

== Gallery ==
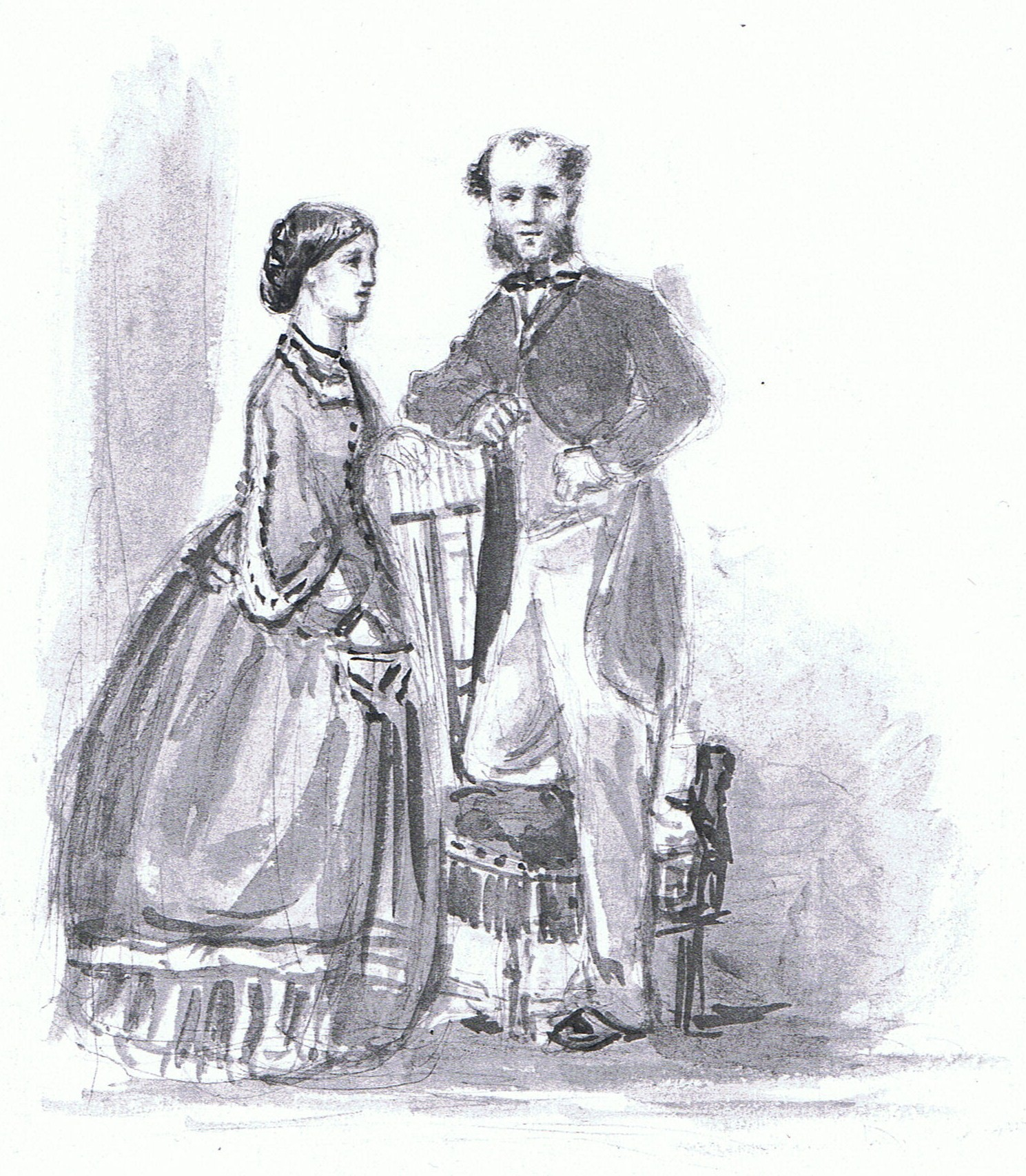
Lord de Tabley's daughter, Meriel, with her husband Allen Bathurst.

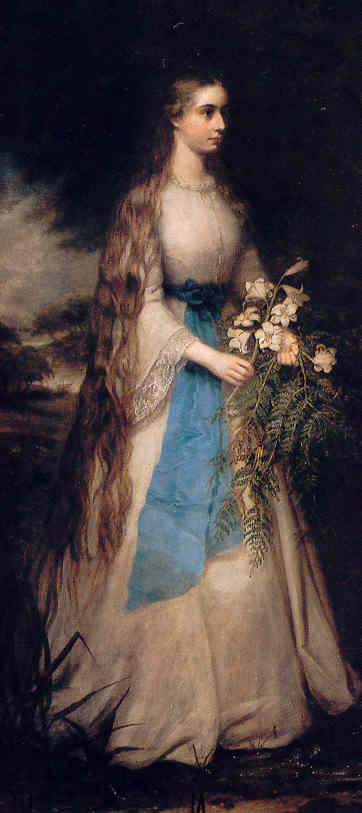
His daughter, Margaret, Lady Stepney-Cowell (d. 1921), by Richard Buckner. Once at Fingask Castle.

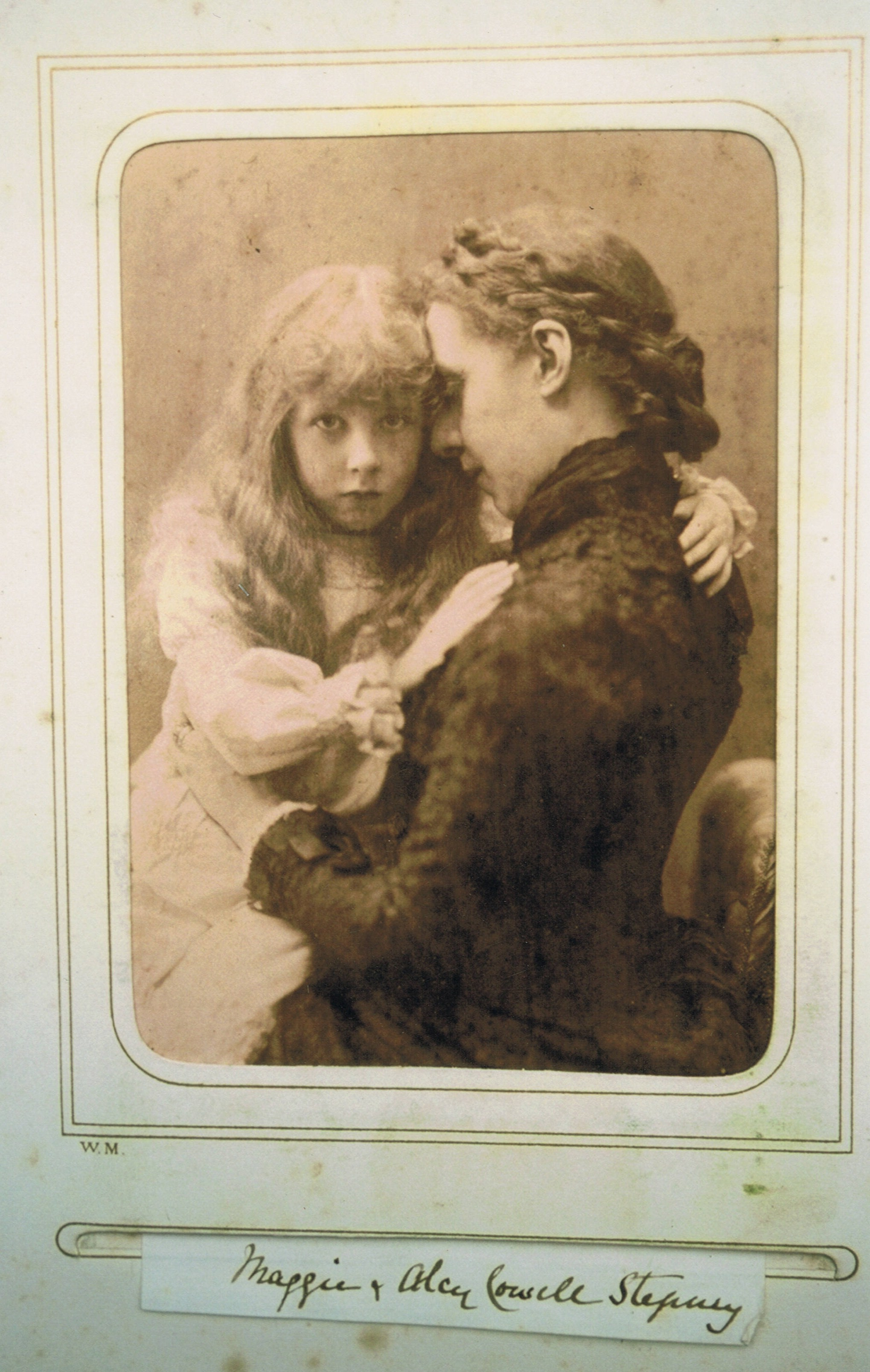
His daughter and granddaughter, Maggie and Alcy Stepney-Cowell.

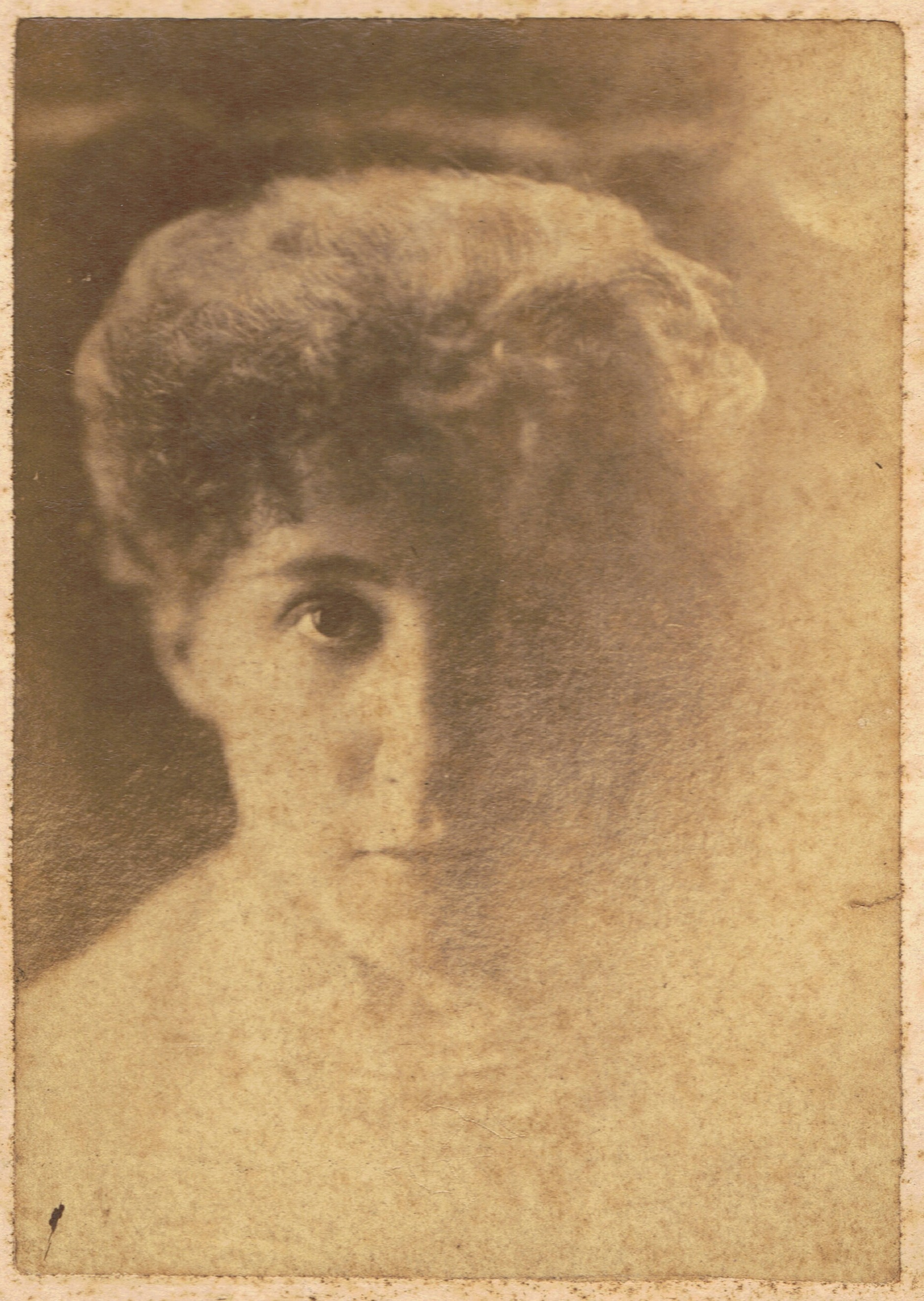
_{His granddaughter, painter and photographer Barbara Sotheby (d. 1952) in 1888. Daughter of Eleanor (Lady) Leighton. Her portrait of her uncle, in coloured chalk, and a portrait of Paul, the porter, belong to the Tabley House Collection.}

Political offices
Preceded by Percy Egerton Herbert	Treasurer of the Household; 1868–1872	Succeeded by The Lord Poltimore
Peerage of the United Kingdom
Preceded by John Fleming Leicester	Baron de Tabley; 1827–1887	Succeeded by John Byrne Leicester Warren
