= John Freeman-Mitford (disambiguation) =

John Freeman-Mitford, 1st Baron Redesdale (1748–1830) was an English lawyer and politician.

John Freeman-Mitford may also refer to:

- John Freeman-Mitford, 1st Earl of Redesdale (1805–1886)
- John Power Bertram Ogilvy Freeman-Mitford, 4th Baron Redesdale (1885–1963)

== See also ==
- John Freeman (disambiguation)
- John Mitford (disambiguation)
