= Jack Freeman =

Jack Freeman may refer to:

- Jack Freeman (Australian rules footballer) (1891–1916), Australian rules footballer
- Jack Freeman (American football) (1918–2003), American college football head coach
- Jack Freeman (American football, born 1922) (1922–1990), American football player for the Brooklyn Dodgers

== See also ==
- John Freeman (disambiguation)
