= John Leicester, 1st Baron de Tabley =

British politician

John Leicester, 1st Baron de Tabley (4 April 1762 – 18 June 1827) was an English landowner, politician, amateur artist, and patron of the arts.

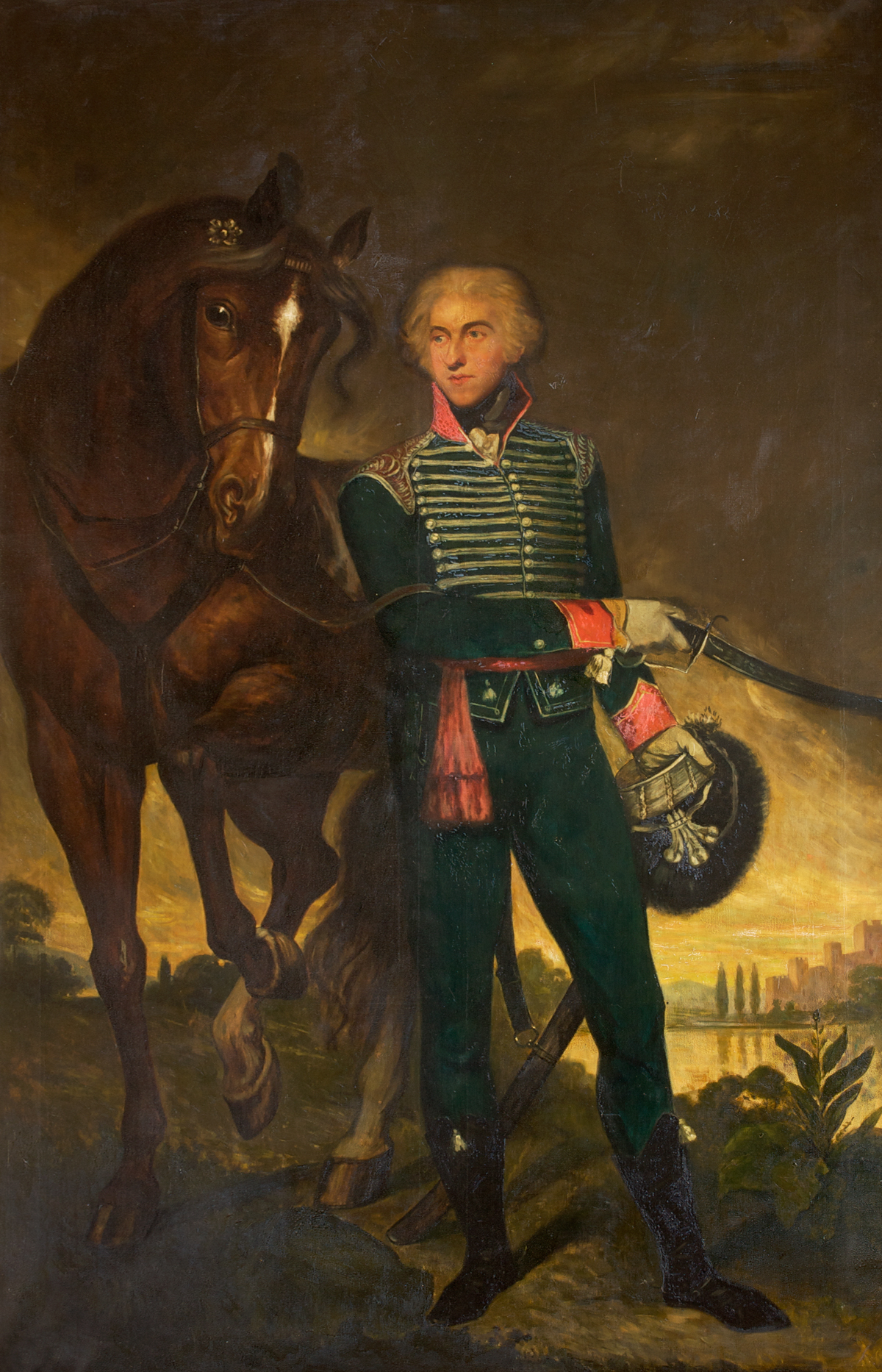
Sir John Fleming Leicester as colonel of yeomanry

== Early life ==
Born at Tabley House in Cheshire, 4 April 1762, he was the eldest son of Sir Peter Leicester, 4th Baronet, by his wife Catherine, coheiress of Sir William Fleming of Rydal, Westmorland. His father was a patron of Wilson, Barret, and other artists, and built the house at Tabley. The son was taught to draw by Robert Marris, Thomas Vivares, and Paul Sandby.

On the death of his father in 1770, Leicester succeeded to the baronetcy and estates, while still a small boy. He was educated at Trinity College, Cambridge, where he proceeded M. A. in 1784, and then travelled on the continent. In Italy about 1786 he met Sir Richard Colt Hoare and they spent time together France and Italy.

== Politician ==
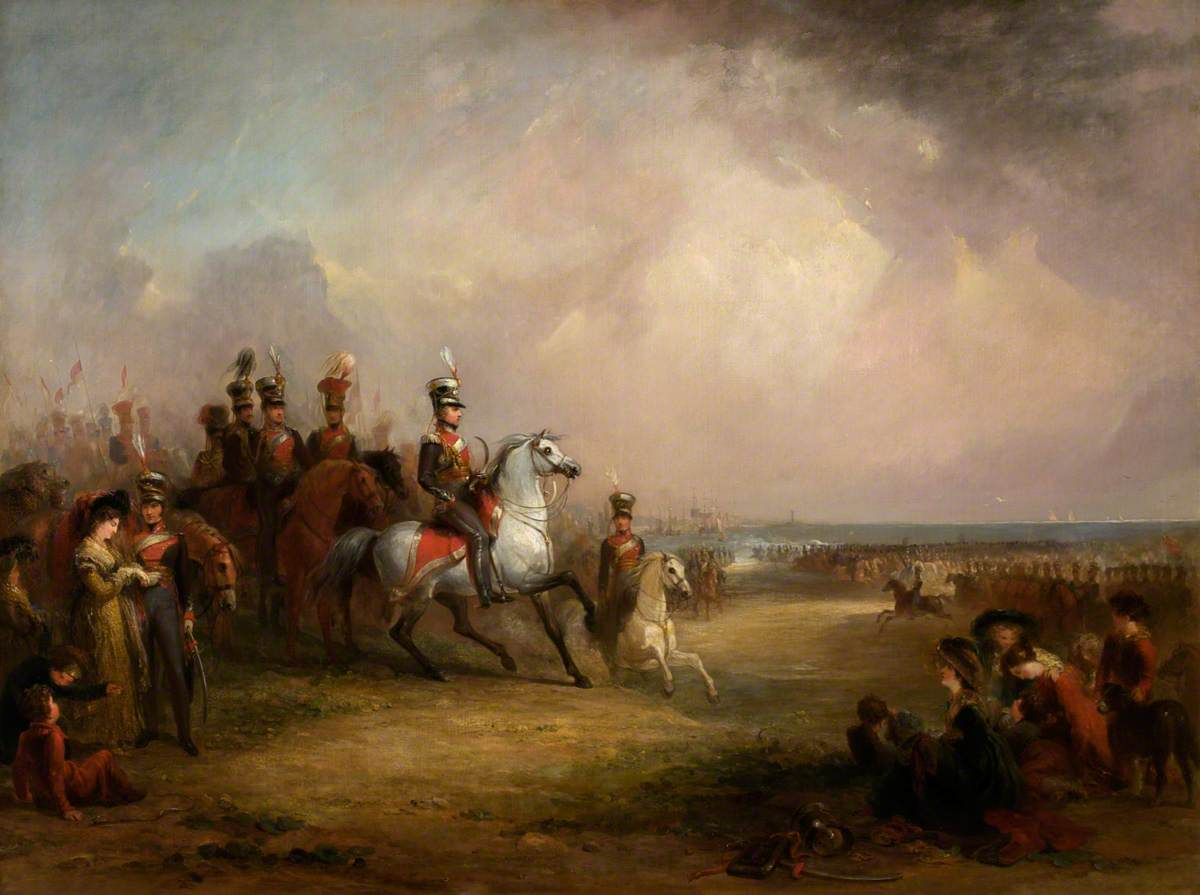
Sir John Leicester and the Cheshire Yeomanry Exercising on the Sands at Liverpool by George Jones, 1824

Leicester was elected Member of Parliament for Yarmouth, Isle of Wight, in 1791, for Heytesbury, Wiltshire, in 1796, and for Stockbridge, Hampshire, in 1807. In parliament he supported the Prince Regent and soon became one of the Prince's personal friends.

Leicester acted also as lieutenant-colonel of the Cheshire militia, and after thirteen years' service was appointed colonel of a regiment of cavalry raised for home defence. During the Napoleonic Wars he raised the regiment eventually called the Cheshire Yeomanry. In 1817, it took part in dispersing the Blanketeers in Lancashire.

== Artistic and intellectual interests ==
Leicester promoted an English school of painting and sculpture. He collected examples of English and Scottish art in a gallery in his London house in Hill Street, Berkeley Square, and from April 1818 onwards the general public could visit his collection. With Colt Hoare and Walter Ramsden Fawkes, the patron of Turner, Leicester contributed to the expansion of patronage to artists in England. Part of his collection of pictures of the English school, of which a catalogue by William Paulet Carey was published in 1819, was sold by auction soon after his death and realised £7,466, then a gigantic sum.

In 1805-1806 Leicester assisted Sir Thomas Bernard in the foundation of the British Institution for Promoting the Fine Arts in the United Kingdom. The Annals of the Fine Arts for 1819 was dedicated to him. He was an honorary member of the Royal Irish Institution and the Royal Cork Society of Arts. Leicester was also interested in music and natural history, and late in life discussed with his friend William Jerdan an elaborate British Ichthyology. He sketched, mainly landscapes, and also painted in oils and made a set of lithographic prints from his own drawings of landscapes and natural history subjects.

== Title and death ==
Leicester was created Baron de Tabley on 16 July 1826. He died at Tabley House on 18 June 1827.

== Family ==
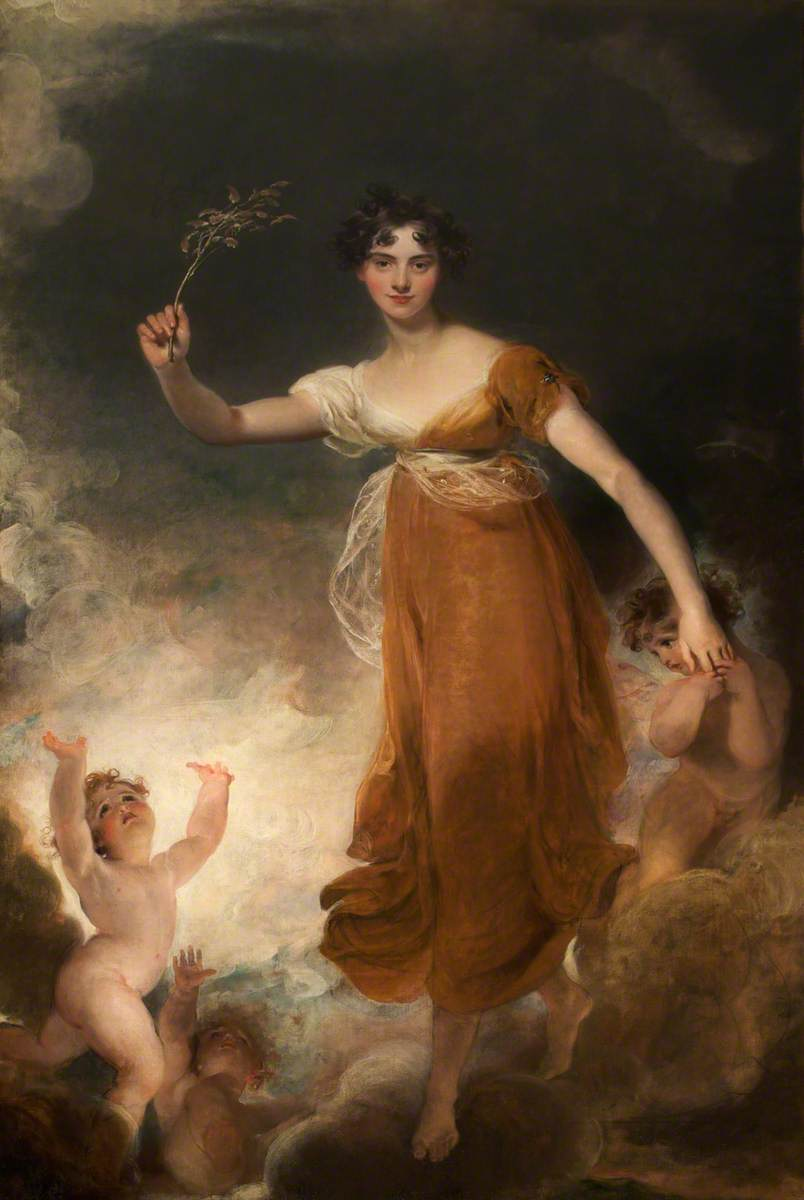
Georgiana, Lady Leicester, (later Lady De Tabley), portrait as "Hope"/The Branch by Sir Thomas Lawrence.

Leicester married, on 9 November 1810, she aged 16, Georgiana Maria, youngest daughter of Lieutenant-Colonel Josiah Cottin, and a noted beauty. Their son, George Warren, 2nd Baron de Tabley succeeded to the title.

Political offices
Peerage of the United Kingdom
New creation	Baron de Tabley; 1826–1827	Succeeded by George Fleming Warren
Baronetage of England
Preceded by Peter Leicester	Baronet (of Nether Tabley); 1770–1827	Succeeded by George Fleming Warren

== Notes ==
- La Belle Assemblee, or Court and Fashionable Magazine, London, August 1828, no. 44, vol. 8, Illustrative Memoir of the Right Honourable Georgiana, Lady De Tabley, pages 47–49;
- The Portrait Gallery of distinguished females, by John Burke, two volumes, London, 1833.

Attribution

This article incorporates text from a publication now in the public domain: Nicholson, Albert (1892). "Leicester, John Fleming". In Lee, Sidney (ed.). Dictionary of National Biography. Vol. 32. London: Smith, Elder & Co. pp. 425–426.
