= Jonathan Freeman =

Jonathan Freeman may refer to:

- Jonathan Freeman (actor) (born 1950), Tony-nominated American actor known for voicing the villainous Jafar in Disney's Aladdin
- Jonathan Freeman (politician) (1745–1808), United States representative from New Hampshire
- Jonathan Freeman-Attwood, principal of the Royal Academy of Music in London, United Kingdom
- Jonathan Freeman (cinematographer), Canadian cinematographer working primarily in America
- Jonathan Freeman (footballer) (born 1994), Australian rules footballer for Brisbane Lions
- Jon Freeman (academic) (Jonathan B. Freeman), American psychologist

== See also ==
- Jon Freeman, computer game industry figure
- Jonny Freeman, British actor and comedian
- John Freeman (disambiguation)
