= John Warren, 3rd Baron de Tabley =

English poet, numismatist, botanist and authority on bookplates (1835–1895)

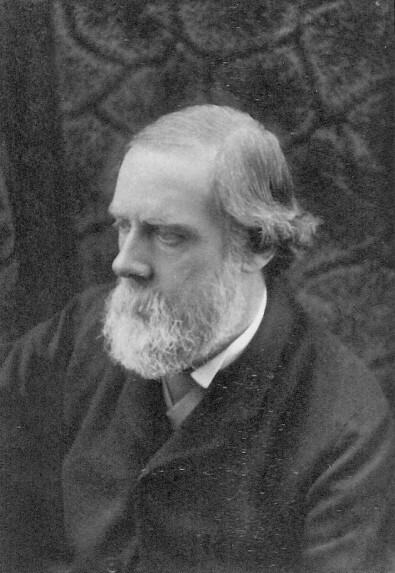

John Byrne Leicester Warren, 3rd Baron de Tabley (26 April 1835 – 22 November 1895) was an English poet, numismatist, botanist and an authority on bookplates.

== Life ==
John Byrne Leicester Warren, third and last Baron de Tabley, was born at Tabley House, Cheshire, on 26 April 1835. He was the eldest son of George Fleming Leicester (afterwards Warren), Lord de Tabley (1811–1887), and his wife (married: 1832) Catherina Barbara (1814–1869), second daughter of Jerome, Count de Salis-Soglio.

The young Warren, as he then was, was educated at Eton from 1847 to 1851, in the Rev. Edward Coleridge's house, and then at Christ Church, Oxford, where he graduated in 1856 with second class honours in classics, law, and modern history. In the autumn of 1858 he went to Turkey as unpaid attaché to Lord Stratford de Redcliffe. In 1860 he was called to the bar from Lincoln's Inn. He was commissioned as a part-time Lieutenant in the Cheshire Yeomanry and unsuccessfully contested Mid-Cheshire as a Liberal in 1868.

After his mother died and his father remarried in 1871, Warren moved to London, where he became a close friend of Tennyson. Tennyson once said of him: 'He is Faunus, he is a woodland creature'.

From 1877 until his succession to the barony and estates in 1887, Warren was lost to his friends, assuming the life of a recluse. It was not until 1892, five years after becoming Lord de Tabley, that he returned to London life and enjoyed a renaissance of reputation and friendship.

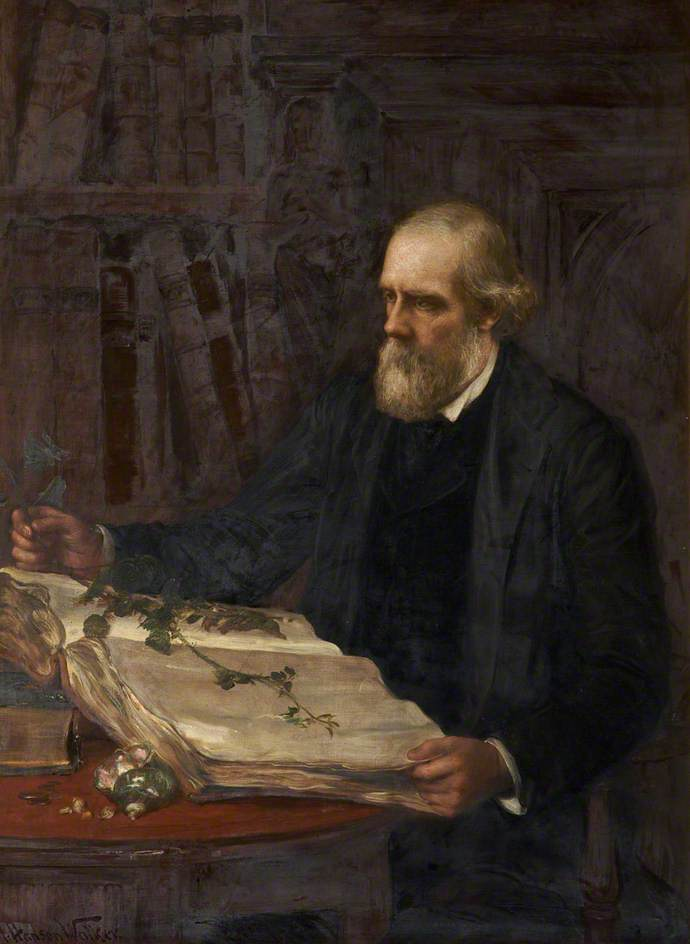
Portrait of Lord de Tabley, (48 x 40 inches), by John Hanson Walker

During the later years of his life, Tabley made many new friends, besides reopening old associations, and he seemed to be gathering around him a small literary company when his health broke, and he died at Ryde on the Isle of Wight in his sixty-first year. He is buried at St Oswald’s Church, Lower Peover, in Cheshire.

Although his reputation will live almost exclusively as that of a poet, Tabley was a man of many studious tastes. He was at one time an authority on numismatics (he was a first cousin of the numismatist John, Count de Salis-Soglio), he wrote two novels, published A Guide to the Study of Book Plates (1880), and the fruit of his careful researches in botany was printed posthumously in his elaborate Flora of Cheshire (1899).

Poetry, however, was his first and last passion, and to that he devoted the best energies of his life. Lord de Tabley's first impulse towards poetry came from his friend George Fortescue, with whom he shared a close companionship during his Oxford days, and whom he lost, as Tennyson lost Hallam, within a few years of their taking their degrees. Fortescue was killed by falling from the mast of Lord Drogheda's yacht in November 1859, and this gloomy event plunged Tabley into a deep depression. Between 1859 and 1862 he issued four little volumes of pseudonymous verse (by G. F. Preston), in the production of which he had been greatly stimulated by the sympathy of Fortescue. Once more he assumed a pseudonym: his Praeterita (1863) bearing the name of William Lancaster.

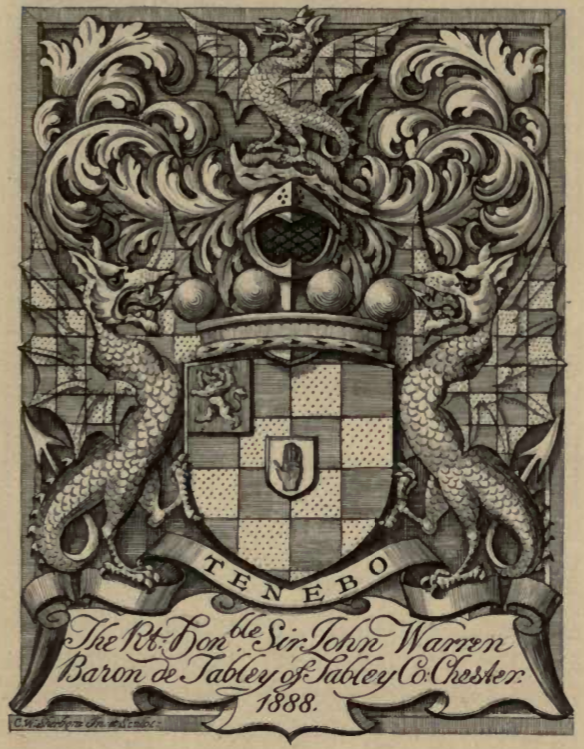
Lord de Tabley's bookplate, engraved by Charles William Sherborn

In the next year he published Eclogues and Monodramas, followed in 1865 by Studies in Verse. These volumes all displayed technical grace and much natural beauty; but it was not until the publication of Philoctetes in 1866 that Tabley met with any wide recognition. Philoctetes bore the initials M.A., which, to the author's dismay, were interpreted as meaning Matthew Arnold. He at once disclosed his identity, and received the congratulations of his friends, among whom were Tennyson, Browning and Gladstone.

In 1867 he published Orestes, in 1870 Rehearsals and in 1873 Searching the Net. These last two bore his own name, John Leicester Warren. He was somewhat disappointed by their lukewarm reception, and when in 1876 The Soldier of Fortune, a drama on which he had bestowed much careful labour, proved a complete failure, he retired altogether from the literary arena.

It was not until 1893 that he was persuaded to return, and the immediate success in that year of his Poems, Dramatic and Lyrical encouraged him to publish a second series in 1895, the year of his death. The genuine interest with which these volumes were welcomed did much to lighten the last years of a somewhat sombre and solitary life. His posthumous poems were collected in 1902.

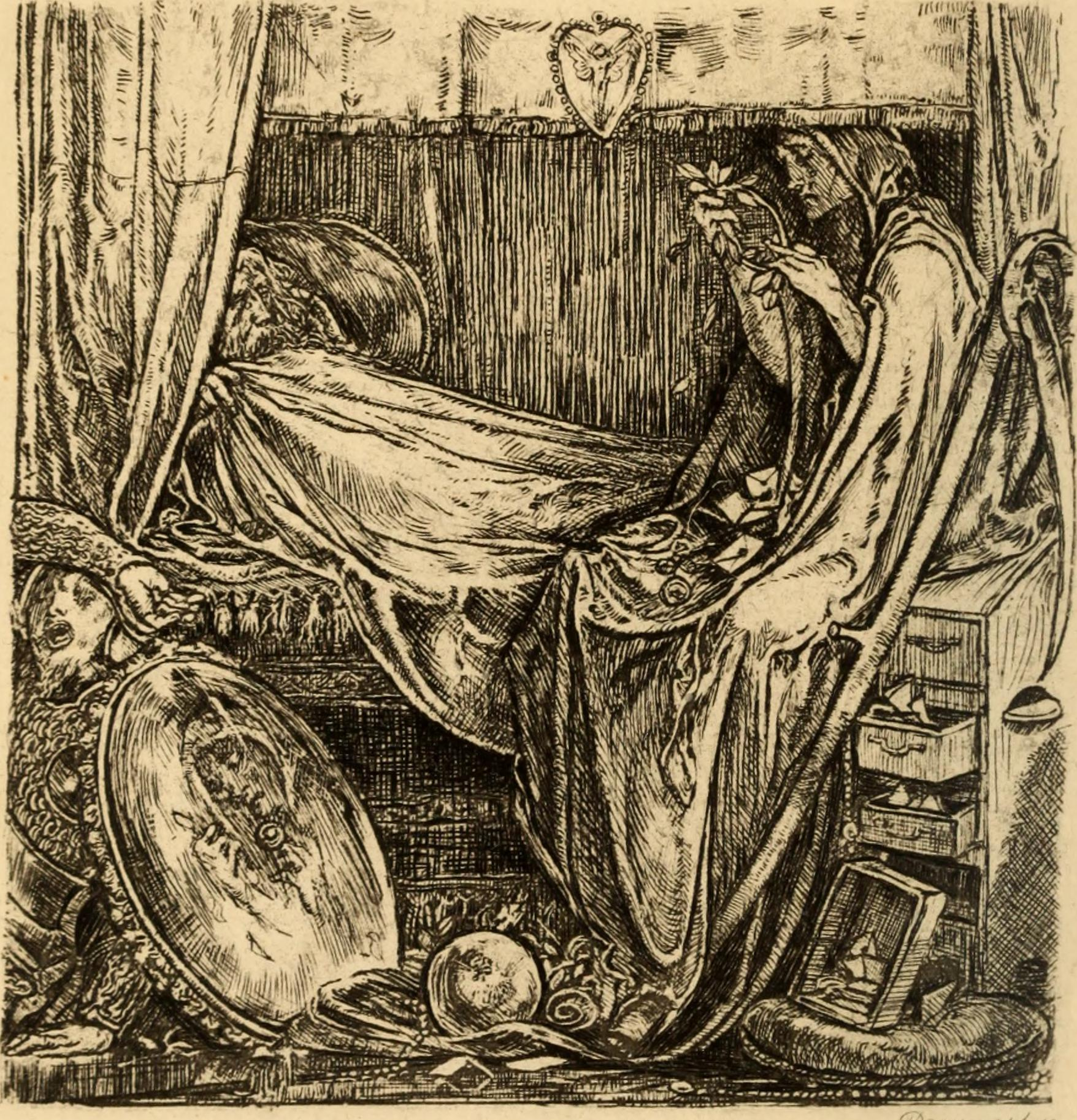
Bookplate from Poems, Dramatic and Lyrical (1893)

Arthur Waugh gives the following assessment of Tabley as a poet:

The characteristics of De Tabley’s poetry are pre-eminently magnificence of style, derived from close study of Milton, sonority, dignity, weight and colour. His passion for detail was both a strength and a weakness: it lent a loving fidelity to his description of natural objects, but it sometimes involved him in a loss of simple effect from over-elaboration of treatment. He was always a student of the classic poets, and drew much of his inspiration directly from them. He was a true and a whole-hearted artist, who, as a brother poet well said, “still climbed the clear cold altitudes of song.” His ambition was always for the heights, a region naturally ice-bound at periods, but always a country of clear atmosphere and bright, vivid outlines.

There is also a sketch of Lord de Tabley by Edmund Gosse in his Critical Kit-Kats (1896). This is an extract of what Gosse wrote:

His character was like an opal, where all the colours lie purdue, drowned in a milky mystery, and so arranged that to a couple of observers, simultaneously bending over it, the prevalent hue shall in one case seem a pale green, in the other a fiery crimson.

== Sisters ==
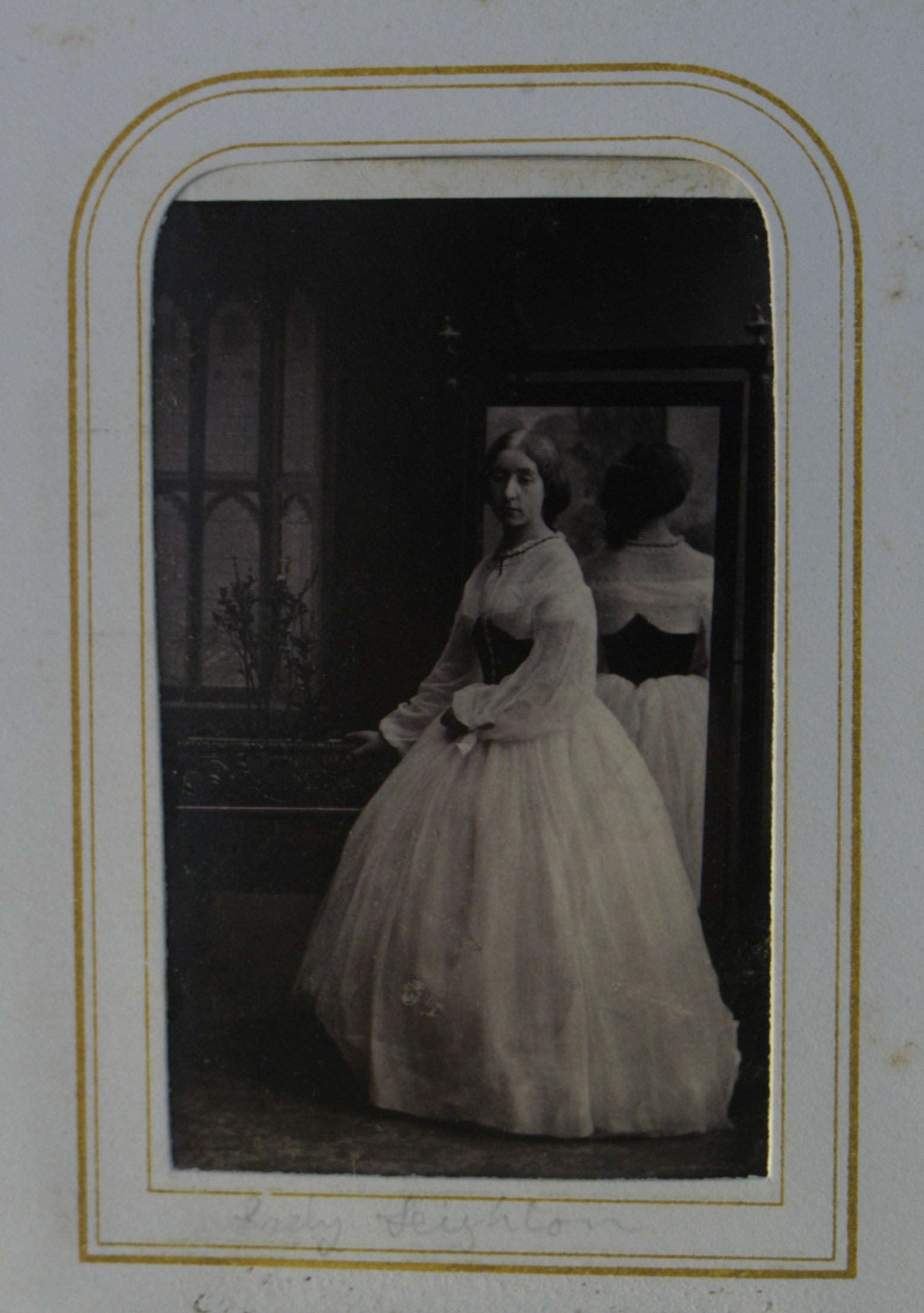
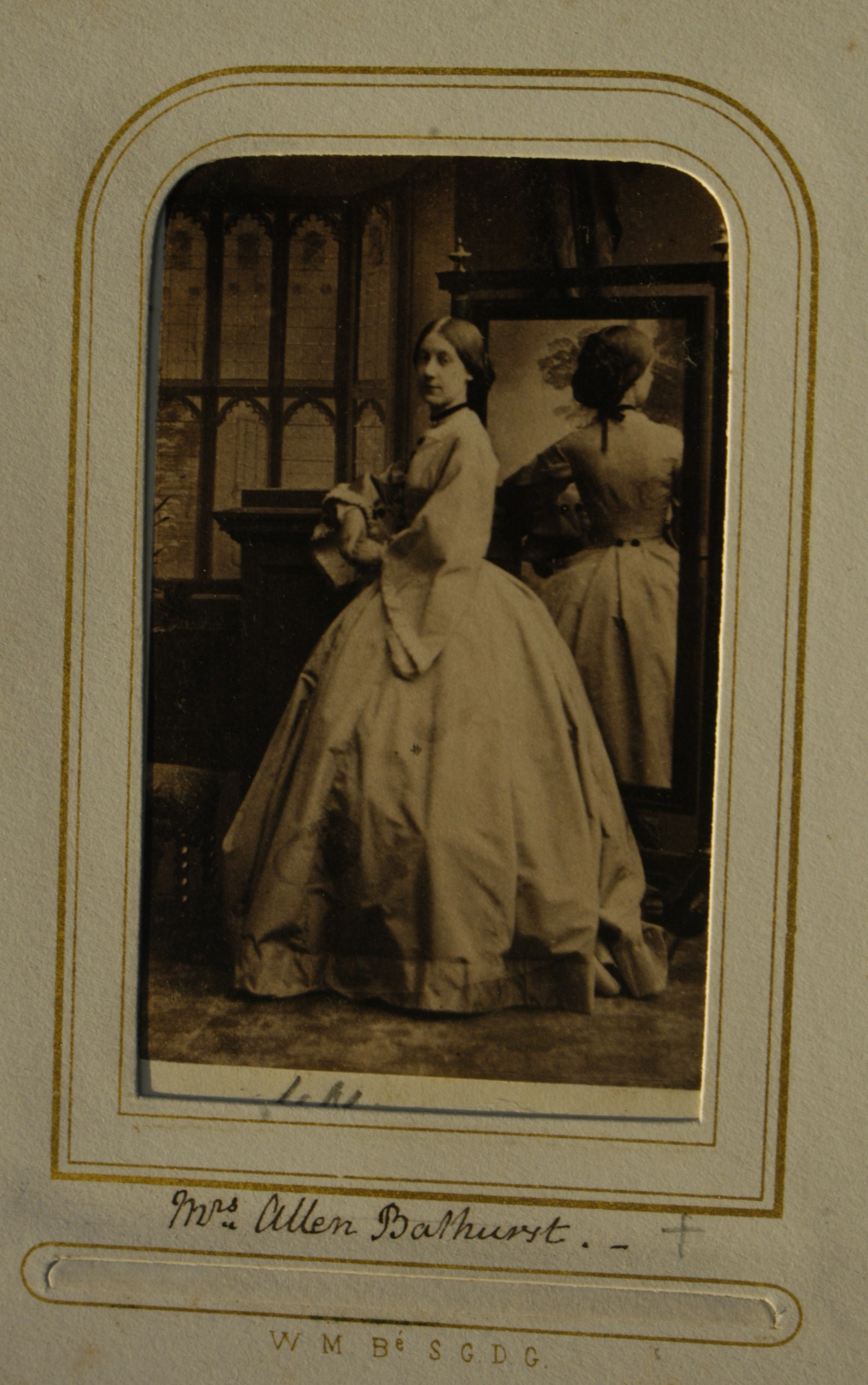
Two of de Tabley's sisters. Eleanor Lady Leighton and Meriel Bathurst
- Catherine (1838–1881). Buried Harlington, Middlesex.
- Meriel (1839–72), married (1862), Allen, 6th Earl Bathurst (1832–1892), of Cirencester. (He succeeded in 1878, after her death).
- Eleanor (1841 – 14 August 1914), married (1864), Sir Baldwyn Leighton, MP, 8th Baronet (1836 – 2 January 1897), of Loton, Salop.

She was (eventual) heir to her brother in 1895, and in 1900 took the name Leighton-Warren.

- Margaret (1847–1921), married (1875), Sir Arthur Cowell-Stepney, 2nd Bt, (aka Emile Algernon Arthur Keppel Cowell-Stepney) (1834–1909), of Llanelli.

Their daughter Catherine Muriel [sic] Cowell Stepney (Miss Alcyone Stepney) (1876–1952), was painted by Sir John Everett Millais, Royal Academy, 1880, No. 239. Of Cilymaenllwyd, Llanelli, she married Sir Stafford Howard, KCB, DL, JP, MP in 1911.

- and two other children, who both died in infancy.

== Two of de Tabley's sisters, a niece and an uncle ==
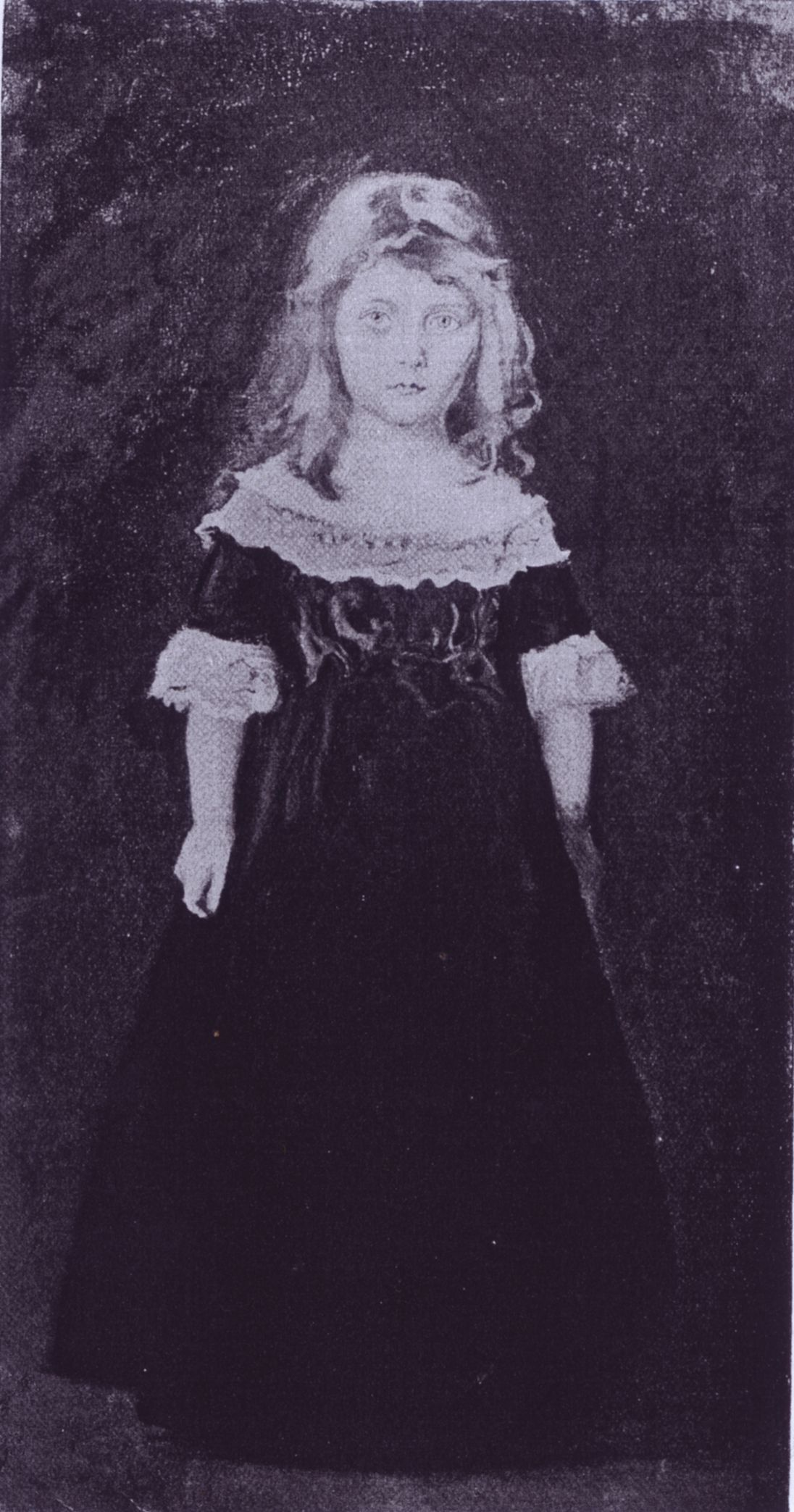
Niece, Alcyone Stepney (1876-1952) by Millais

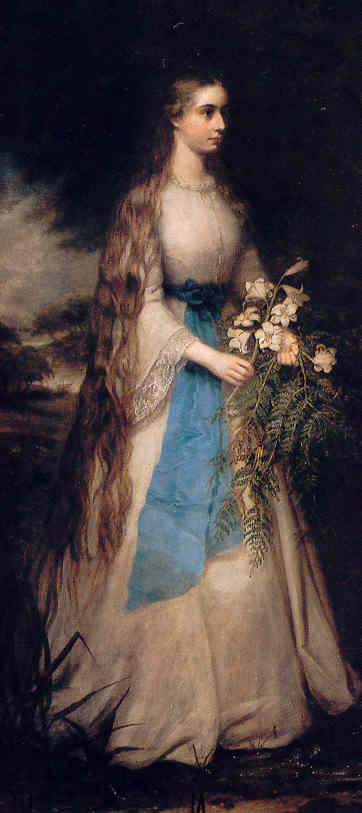
His sister. Margaret, Lady Stepney-Cowell (d.1921), by Richard Buckner. Once hung at Fingask Castle.

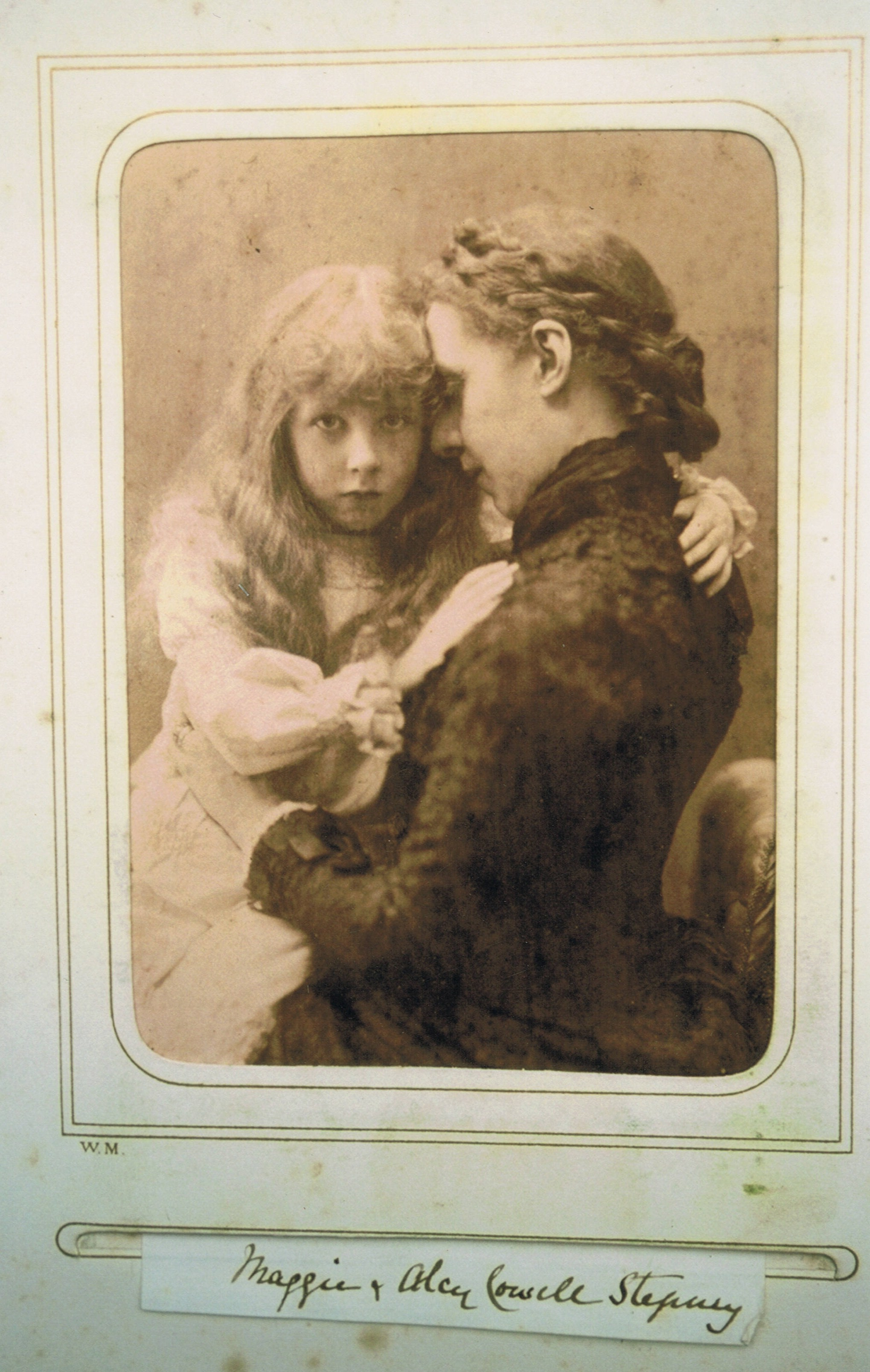
A sister & niece. Maggie & Alcy Stepney Cowell.

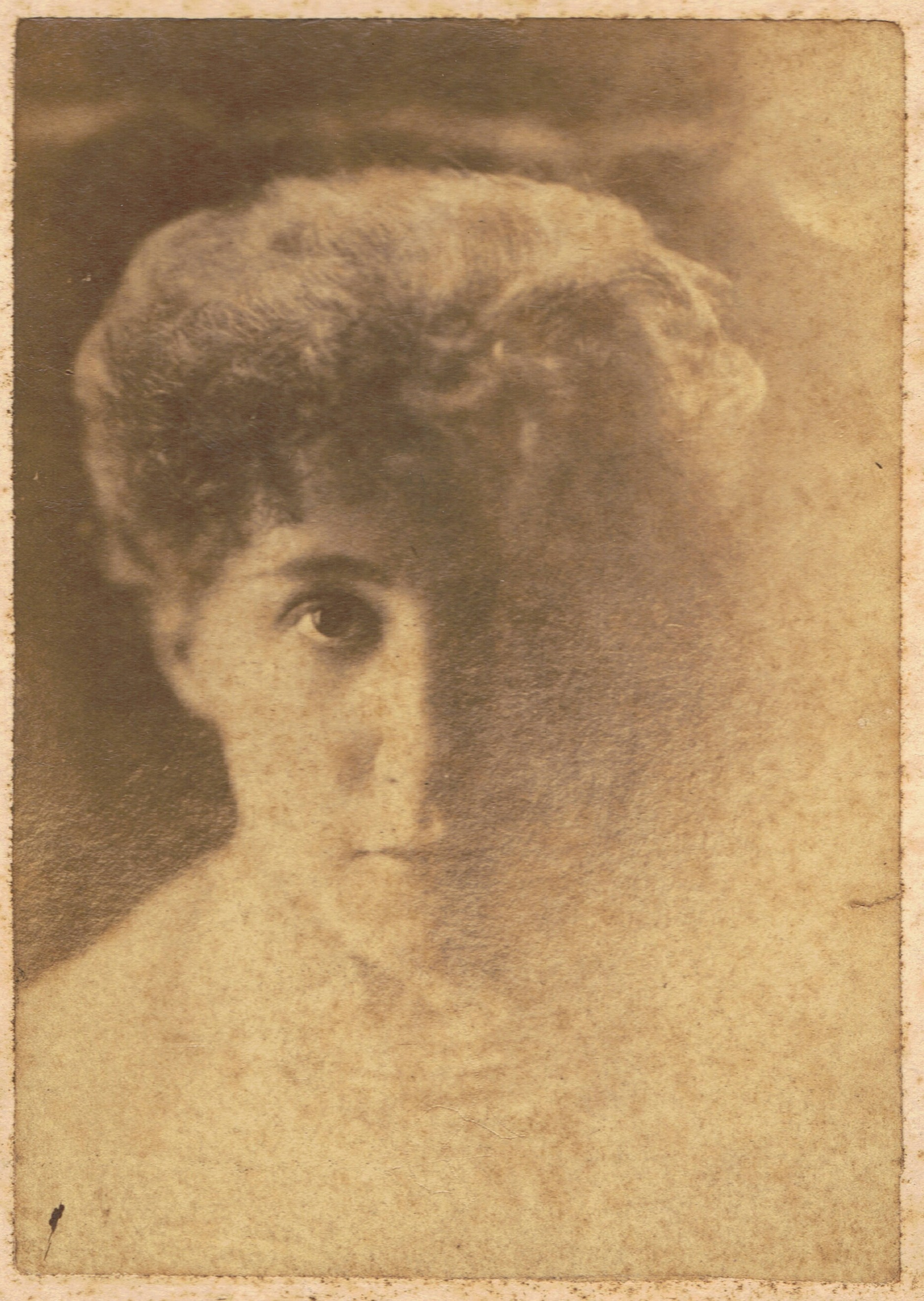
A Niece. The painter and photographer Barbara Sotheby (d. 1952) in 1888. Daughter of his sister Eleanor Leighton. On 28 September 1909 she married Alfred (d. 9 October 1949), younger son of Admiral Sir Edward Southwell Sotheby. Her portrait of her uncle, in coloured chalk, and a portrait of Paul, the porter, belong to the Tabley House Collection.

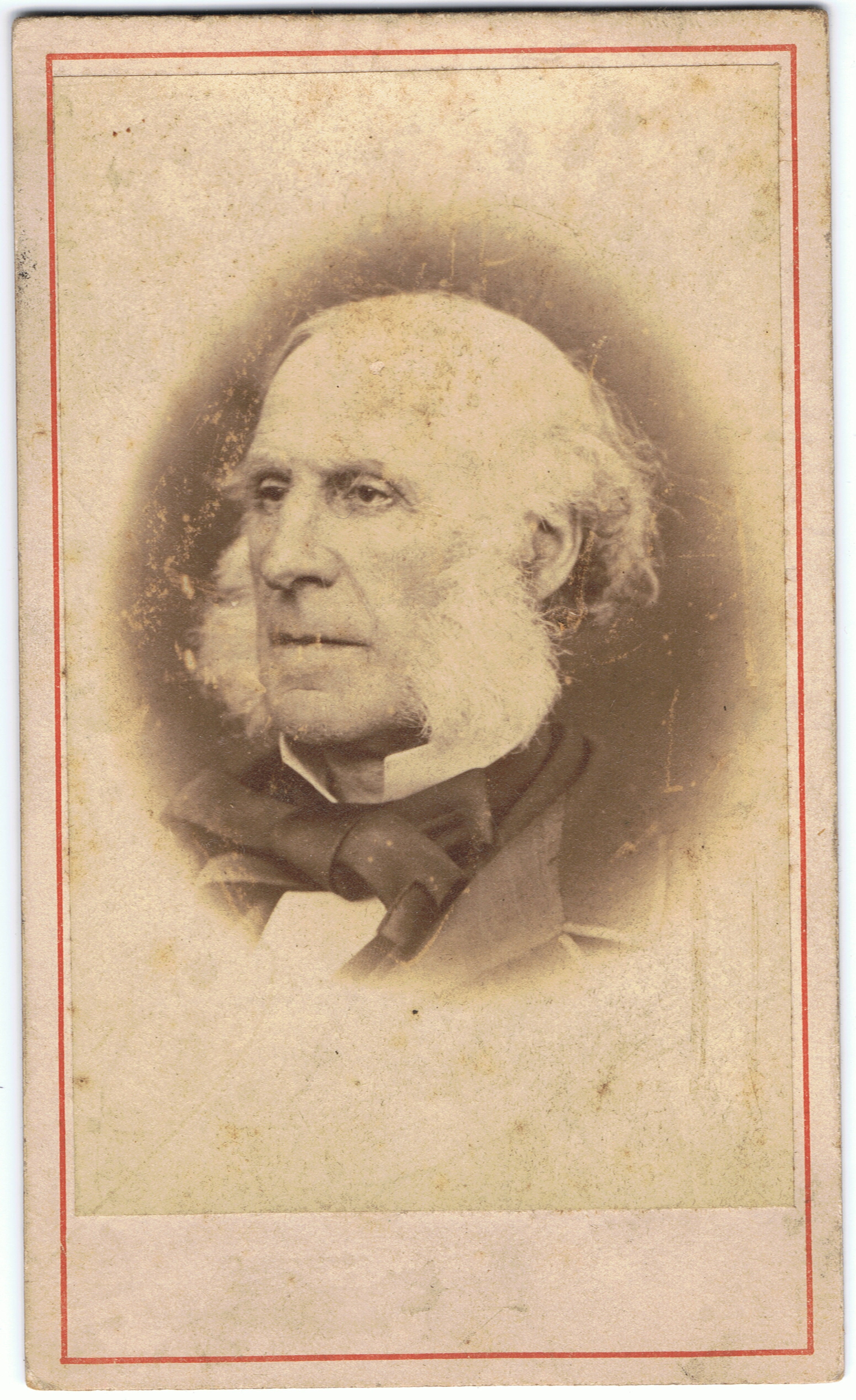
His uncle William.

Peerage of the United Kingdom
Preceded by George Warren	Baron de Tabley; 1887–1895	Extinct
Baronetage of England
Preceded by George Fleming Warren	Baronet (of Nether Tabley); 1887–1895	Succeeded by Peter Leicester
