= Sir Gregory Byrne, 1st Baronet =

Sir Gregory Byrne, 1st Baronet (c.1640 – March 1712) was an Irish Jacobite soldier and politician.

Byrne was the son of Daniel Byrne, a wealthy clothier, and Anne Taylor. He was admitted to Gray's Inn on 23 June 1662 to train in law. In 1663 he was implicated in the murder of Mathew Webb, but received a pardon from Charles II of England. On 17 May 1671 he was created a baronet, of Nether Tabley in the Baronetage of England, after his father purchased the title. He inherited the lordships of Sheen and Timogue from his father in 1684.

An adherent of James II of England following the Glorious Revolution, he was appointed High Sheriff of Queen's County in 1689. He received a commission as a captain in the Jacobite army in 1689 and was present at the Siege of Derry. Byrne was the Member of Parliament for Ballynakill in the brief Irish Patriot Parliament called by James II the same year. He was appointed Tax Assessor for the Queen’s County on 10 April 1690. He fought at the Battle of the Boyne in July 1690 and was subsequently attainted for treason. On 23 January 1693, Byrne appears on the list of Roman Catholic officers pardoned by William III of England on 17 December 1692. In 1693 he was arrested and briefly detained in Dublin during a French invasion scare but later in the year he was included in the conditional release of Irish officers, and finally pardoned in 1694 under the terms of the Treaty of Limerick.

In 1669 he married Margaret Copley, daughter of Colonel Christopher Copley. He was succeeded in his title by his son, Daniel Byrne.

Parliament of Ireland
Preceded by Thomas Keating; Sir Amos Meredith	Member of Parliament for Ballynakill; 1689; With: Oliver Grace	Succeeded by John Barrington; Daniel Weaver
Baronetage of England
New creation	Baronet (of Nether Tabley); 1671–1712	Succeeded by Daniel Byrne
