= John Mitford (Royal Navy officer) =

British naval officer, poet and journalist

- Born: 22 January 1782; Mitford, Northumberland
- Died: 24 December 1831 (aged 49); St Giles, London
- Burial place: St. Dunstan's, London
- Military career
- Allegiance: Great Britain; United Kingdom
- Branch: Royal Navy
- Service years: 1795–1811
- Conflicts: French Revolutionary Wars; Battle of Hyères Islands; Battle of Santa Cruz de Tenerife; Battle of the Nile; Napoleonic Wars
- Other work: Writer, journalist and editor

John Mitford (22 January 1782 – 24 December 1831) was a British naval officer, poet and journalist who is best remembered for his book The adventures of Johnny Newcome in the navy.

== Early life and naval career ==
Mitford was born at Mitford, Northumberland. As one of the Mitfords of Mitford Castle he was a cousin to Admiral Robert Mitford the bird-artist and Philip Meadows Taylor (author of Confessions of a Thug), and distantly related to Lord Redesdale (attorney general), William Mitford (historian), the Reverend John Mitford, and Mary Russell Mitford (author of Our Village). The younger son of a younger son, Mitford had to make his own way in life and he chose a career in the navy. The patronage of his relative Lord Redesdale secured him a place as a midshipman on the Victory in April 1795.

Mitford was present at the Battle of Hyères Islands on 13 July 1795. The next year he moved into the Zealous with Captain (later Sir) Samuel Hood, and was present at the disastrous attack on Santa Cruz in July 1797, and at the battle of the Nile on 1–2 August 1798. Mitford afterwards served under Hood in the Courageux and was with him in 1801 in the Venerable. From 1804 to 1806 he commanded a revenue cutter on the coast of Ireland, and from 1809 to 1811 was acting-master of the brig Philomel in the Mediterranean. In 1808 he married Emily Street of Dalintober, Argyll. The couple had two sons, John (born 1808) and Charles Bertram (born 1810), and two daughters Frances (born 1812) and Emily (born 1815). The marriage ended in separation.

== The Blackheath affair ==
In late 1811 Mitford received an offer of a position in the civil service from Lady Bridget Perceval, who was daughter-in-law of the Earl of Egmont, and a family connection of Mitford's relative and patron Lord Redesdale. When he returned to England however Mitford found that the position did not exist and Bridget Perceval wanted him instead to join her campaign in support of Princess Caroline (a neighbour in Blackheath). While Mitford was helping Bridget Perceval place letters in the newspapers he was hidden away in Warburton's private asylum in Hoxton, Whitmore House. In the spring of 1813 Bridget Perceval and Mitford 'overleaped the bounds the prudence' and a letter in The News purportedly signed by Lords Eldon, Castlereagh, and Liverpool and promising Caroline a larger establishment was traced to Mitford, who swore that the letter had originated with Lady Perceval and that he had no idea it was a forgery. Lady Perceval denied all knowledge of the letter and brought a case against Mitford for perjury; Mitford was tried and acquitted.

Mitford's stay in Warburton's asylum provided him with the material for two anonymous pamphlets (published in the 1820s) exposing the exploitation, neglect and abuse of patients. He had previously petitioned Parliament to inquire into conditions in Warburton's asylums, but without success. "All private mad-houses are alike public evils, that should be destroyed" wrote Mitford.

== Literary career ==
Mitford spent the rest of his life in London, making a living from writing and editing and by all accounts living a hand-to-mouth existence. In 1818 he produced a book of verse, The poems of a British sailor, some of which had been written when he was at sea and others while he was working for Bridget Perceval. The same year saw the publication (under the pseudonym of Alfred Burton) of Mitford's most famous work: The adventures of Johnny Newcome in the navy, a poem in four cantos, illustrated by Thomas Rowlandson. Johnny Newcome (a generic term for new recruits) is a clergyman's son who is forced to leave school and join the navy when his clergyman father loses all his money in a banking crash. He embarks on HMS Capricorn at Sheerness and, under the good Captain Dale his career prospers, but in Jamaica yellow fever strikes the ship, Captain Dale dies and is replaced by the bullying Captain Teak, and Johnny regretfully leaves the navy. Another edition of Johnny Newcome appeared the following year, and the poem was reprinted by Methuen in 1905. Mitford wrote the poem in six weeks whilst sleeping out in Bayswater Fields under a shelter made of nettles, and washing in a gravel pit. To keep the poetry flowing, his publisher allowed him a shilling a day; he lived on bread and cheese and spent the rest on gin. Mitford's other works include:

- The adventures of a post captain, a poem in similar style to The adventures of Johnny Newcome in the navy which recounts the adventures of Captain Bowsprit.
- A peep into Windsor Castle after the lost mutton, a satirical pro-Caroline poem about the Prince Regent
- The king is a true British sailor, a song about King William IV.

Other works have been attributed to Mitford, including: Confessions of Julia Johnstone, written by herself in contradiction to the fables of Harriette Wilson (1825)

As an editor, he worked on: Scourge, or Monthly exposure of Imposture and Folly (1811–1814); New Bon-Ton magazine or the Telescope of the Times (1818–21); New London Rambler’s Magazine (1828–30). At the time of his death he was editing the Quizzical Gazette and Merry Companion.

Mitford defended the reputation of Emma, Lady Hamilton when Edward Pelham Brenton, in his Naval history of Great Britain, accused her of having demanded to be rowed round the Minerva to see Admiral Caracciolo hanging. Mitford wrote a letter to the Morning Post denying Brenton's version of events; Brenton in turn dismissed Mitford as someone who lodged 'over a coal shed in some obscure street near Leicester Square'. But more eyewitnesses, including Francis Augustus Collier, came forward to dispute Brenton's version of events and support Mitford's.

Mitford died of a chest infection in St Giles workhouse in December 1831, aged 49, and was buried in the graveyard at St Dunstan's, Fleet Street.

Mitford's unconventional life-style and association with publishers such as William Benbow and Edward Duncombe made him the subject of harsh criticism, although his talents as a writer were recognised. William Howitt referred to him as "one of the most deplorable instances of misused talents, and one of the most pitiable victims of intemperance and want of prudence", while another Victorian writer described him in the following terms: "Jack was a respectable classical scholar, and possessed some literary ability; but, instead of devoting his talents to any useful purpose, he prostituted them to the lowest ends. Drink, drink, drink! became his besetment and from the day it did so his ignoble fate was sealed." More recently he has been described as "a brilliant hack satirist with an intimate knowledge of the Royal domestic politics" and capable of "more than passable satirical verse".
