= John Freeman (painter) =

British painter

- Occupation: Painter

John Freeman (fl. 1670–1720) was a British painter.

== Biography ==
Freeman gained some repute as a history painter during the reign of Charles II. In his early life, he went to the West Indies, where he narrowly escaped death by poisoning. He returned to England, and was much employed, although "his Genius was so impair'd by that Attempt on his Life, that his latter Works fail'd of their usual Perfection." He was considered a rival of Isaac Fuller. He drew in the academy that existed at the time, and later served as a scene painter to the play-house in Covent Garden. Some plates in R. Blome's History of the Old and New Testament are probably from his designs. It is not known when he died, but he is considered unlikely to have lived till 1747 and be identical with the I. Freeman who drew the large view of The Trial of Lord Lovat in Westminster Hall.
