= Leicester baronets =

Extinct baronetcy in the Baronetage of England

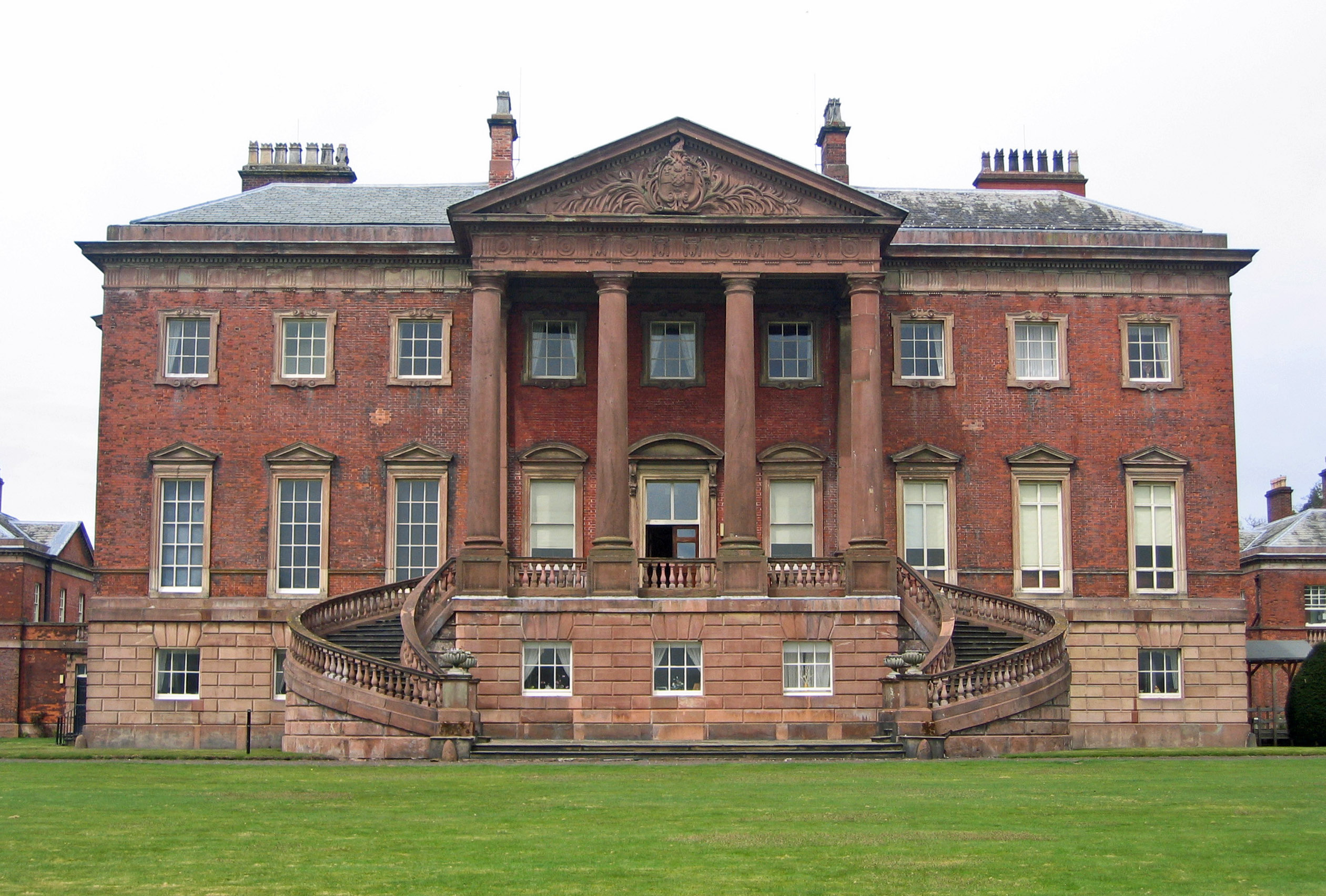
Tabley House, the seat of the Leicester family

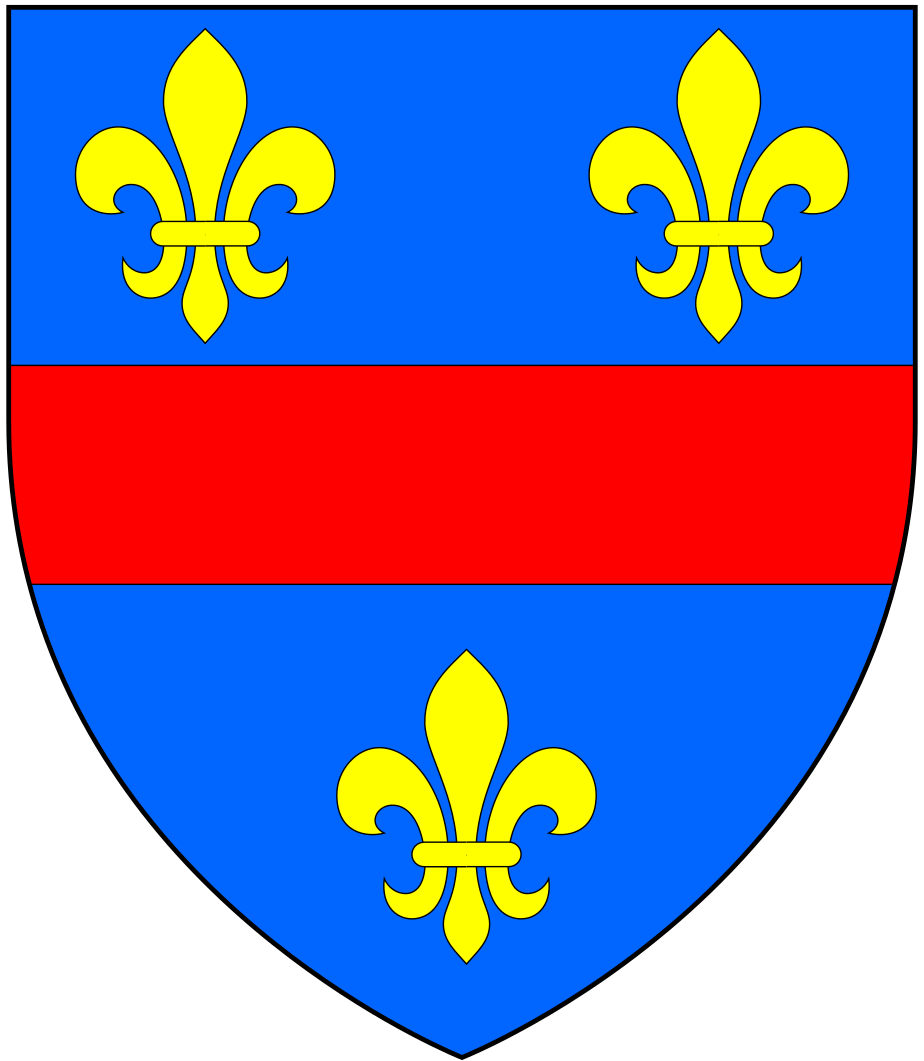
Arms of Leycester of Tabley Old Hall, Cheshire and of the Leicester baronets (1671): Azure, a fess gules between three fleurs-de-lys or. The arms of Leycester are a known contravention of the heraldic "Rule of tincture"

There have been two baronetcies created for persons with the surname Leicester, both in the Baronetage of England. The fifth Baronet of the second creation was raised to the peerage as Baron de Tabley in 1826. Both the barony and the two baronetcies are now extinct.

The Leicester Baronetcy, of Tabley in the County of Chester, was created in the Baronetage of England on 10 August 1660 for Peter Leicester. The third Baronet sat as Member of Parliament for Newton. The title became extinct on his death in 1742. See also the 1671 creation below.

The Byrne, later Leicester, later Warren, later Leicester Baronetcy, of Timogue in the Queen's County, was created in the Baronetage of England on 17 May 1671 for Gregory Byrne, the son of Daniel Byrne, a wealthy clothier. He represented Ballynakill in the Irish House of Commons and was High Sheriff of Queen's County in 1689. His grandson Sir John Byrne, the third Baronet, was High Sheriff of Cheshire in 1740. He married Meriel, daughter of Sir Francis Leicester, 3rd and last Baronet, of Tabley (see above). He was succeeded by his son Sir Peter Byrne Leicester, the fourth Baronet, who assumed the surname of Leicester in lieu of his patronymic in 1744 on inheriting the estates of his maternal grandfather. He later sat as Member of Parliament for Preston. His son Sir John Fleming Leicester, the fifth Baronet, was Member of Parliament for Yarmouth, Heytesbury and Stockbridge. On 10 July 1826 he was raised to the Peerage of the United Kingdom as Baron de Tabley, of Tabley House in the County Palatine of Chester.

His eldest son Sir George Leicester the second Baron, assumed in 1832 by Royal licence the surname of Warren in lieu of Leicester under the terms of the will of his kinswoman Elizabeth Warren-Bulkeley (née Warren), Viscountess Bulkeley. He sat on the Liberal benches in the House of Lords and served under William Ewart Gladstone as Treasurer of the Household between 1868 and 1872. On the second Baron's death the titles passed to his son Sir John Leicester Warren, the third Baron. He was a poet, numismatist, botanist and an authority on bookplates. When he died in 1895 the barony became extinct while he was succeeded in the baronetcy by his kinsman Peter Fleming Frederic Leicester, the eighth Baronet. He was the grandson of Charles Leicester, younger son of the fourth Baronet. The baronetcy became extinct as well on the death of the ninth Baronet in 1968.

The seat of the Leicester family was Tabley House, Tabley Inferior, Cheshire.

== Leicester baronets, of Tabley (1660) ==
- Sir Peter Leicester, 1st Baronet (1614–1678)
- Sir Robert Leicester, 2nd Baronet (1643–1684)
- Sir Francis Leicester, 3rd Baronet (1674–1742)

== Byrne, later Leicester, later Warren, later Leicester baronets, of Nether Tabley (1671) ==
- Sir Gregory Byrne, 1st Baronet (died 1712)
- Sir Daniel Byrne, 2nd Baronet (1676–1715)
- Sir John Byrne, 3rd Baronet (c. 1705–1742)
- Sir Peter Leicester, 4th Baronet (1732–1770)
- Sir John Fleming Leicester, 5th Baronet (1762–1827) (created Baron de Tabley in 1826)

== Barons de Tabley (1826) ==
- John Fleming Leicester, 1st Baron de Tabley (1762–1827)
- George Fleming Warren, 2nd Baron de Tabley (1811–1887)
- John Byrne Leicester Warren, 3rd Baron de Tabley (1835–1895)

== Byrne, later Leicester baronets, of Nether Tabley (1671; reverted) ==
- Sir Peter Fleming Frederic Leicester, 8th Baronet (1863–1945)
- Sir Charles Byrne Warren Leicester, 9th Baronet (1896–1968)
