= Josiah Cottin =

English army officer (1771–1843)

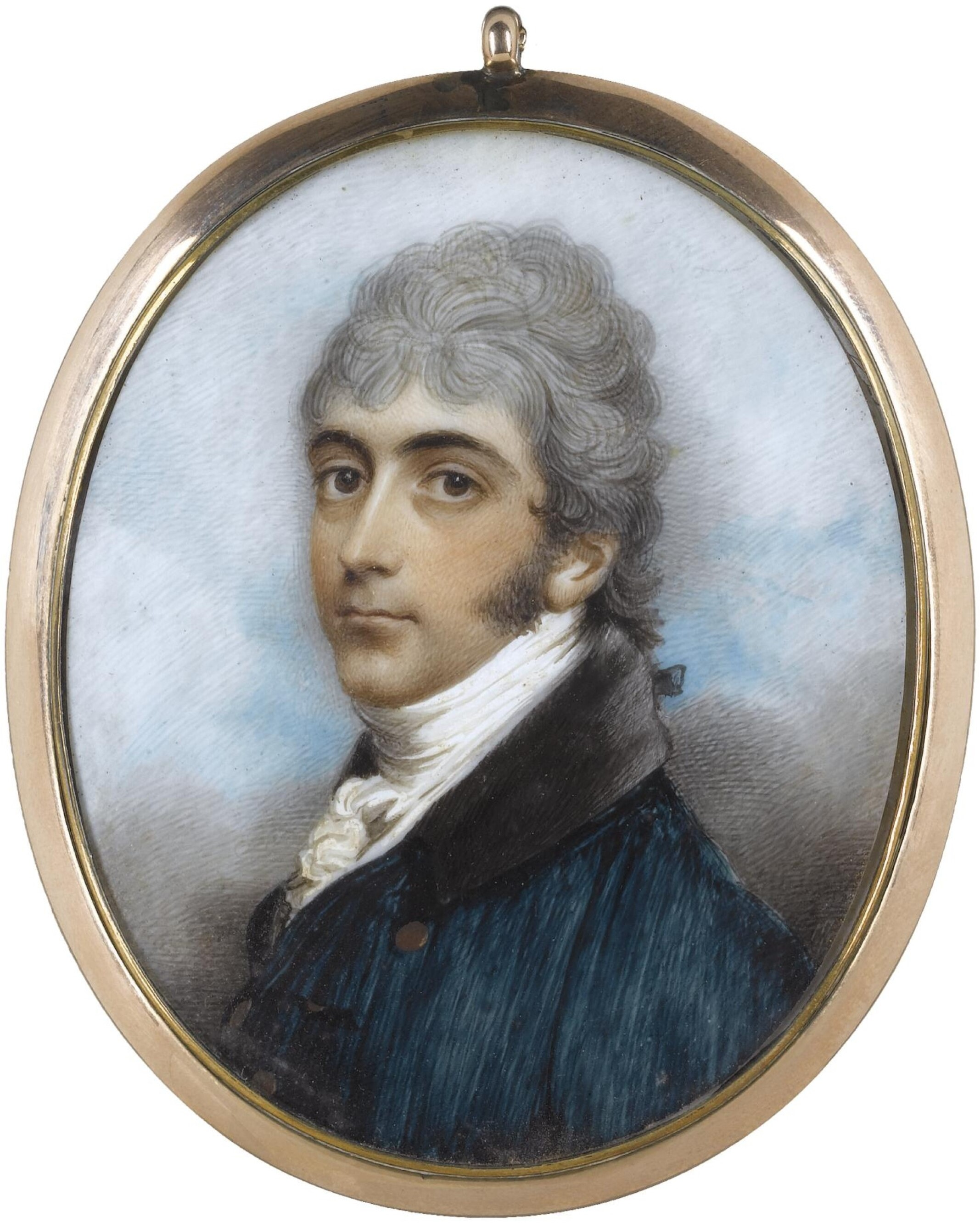
- portrait by Andrew Plimer
- Born: 1771
- Died: 1843 (aged 71–72)
- Military career
- Allegiance: United Kingdom
- Rank: Colonel

Josiah Cottin (1771–1843) was an English army officer. He is now remembered for his association with a notorious courtesan, who assumed the name Julia Johnstone.

== Life ==
He was the son of Alexander Cottin (died 1794) of Hertfordshire; his sister Mary Ann married George Thackeray. Alexander Cottin was baptised in 1745 at St Antholin, Budge Row, and was from a Huguenot family, the son of Josiah and Jane Cottin; he married first Anne Chapman, who was Josiah's mother.

Cottin studied at Daventry Academy from 1783. He then served in the 10th Light Dragoons. Jane, widow of Josiah Cottin the elder, died in 1792 leaving £3,000 for Josiah Cottin the younger, her grandson. It was in trust, but allowed for "his advancement in the army". Cottin became Colonel of the 10th Light Dragoons. He died in March 1843, at Hampton Court Palace.

== Family ==
Cottin married Lavinia, daughter of William Chambers, in 1792. Their daughter Georgina Maria, god daughter to the Prince of Wales, married in 1810 Sir John Fleming Leicester, 5th Baronet.

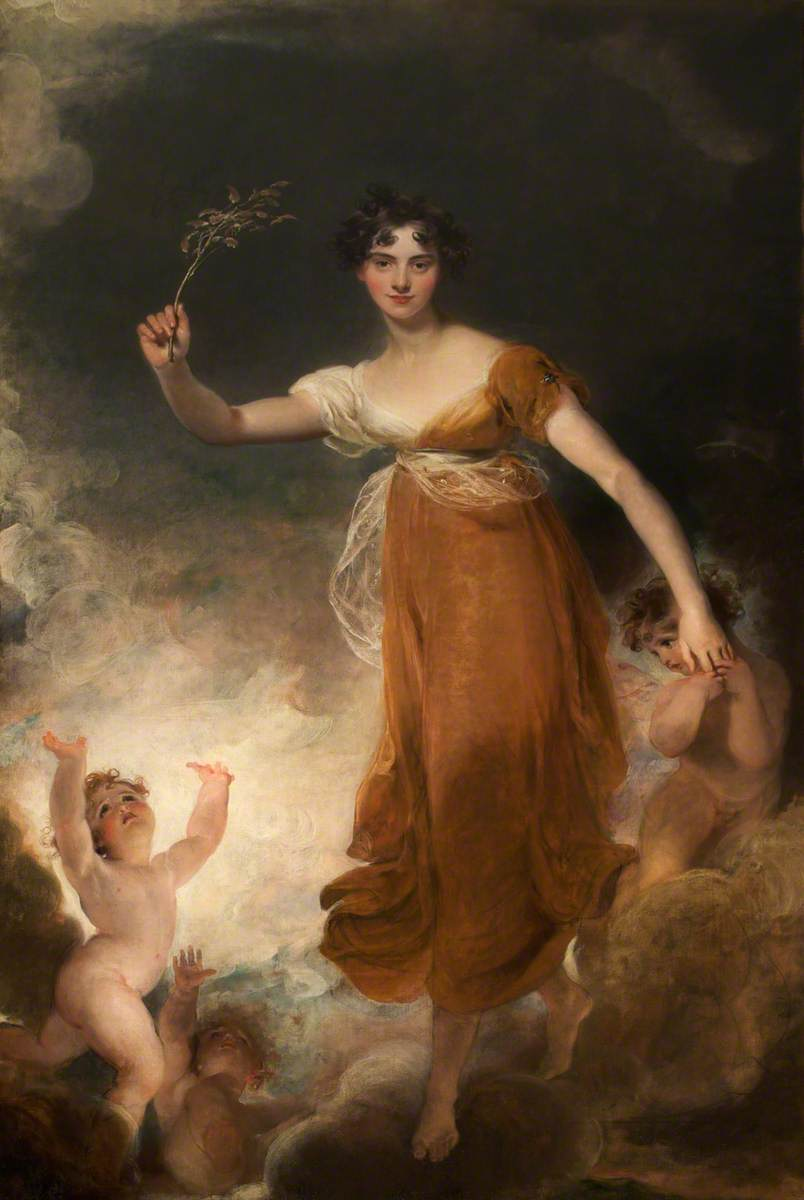
Georgina Maria Cottin as "Hope", portrait by Thomas Lawrence

The other children were Adolphus (later Adolphus Murray), Elizabeth, and Anna Eliza Catherine, her father's heiress.

== Hampton Court Palace and relationship with "Julia Johnstone" ==
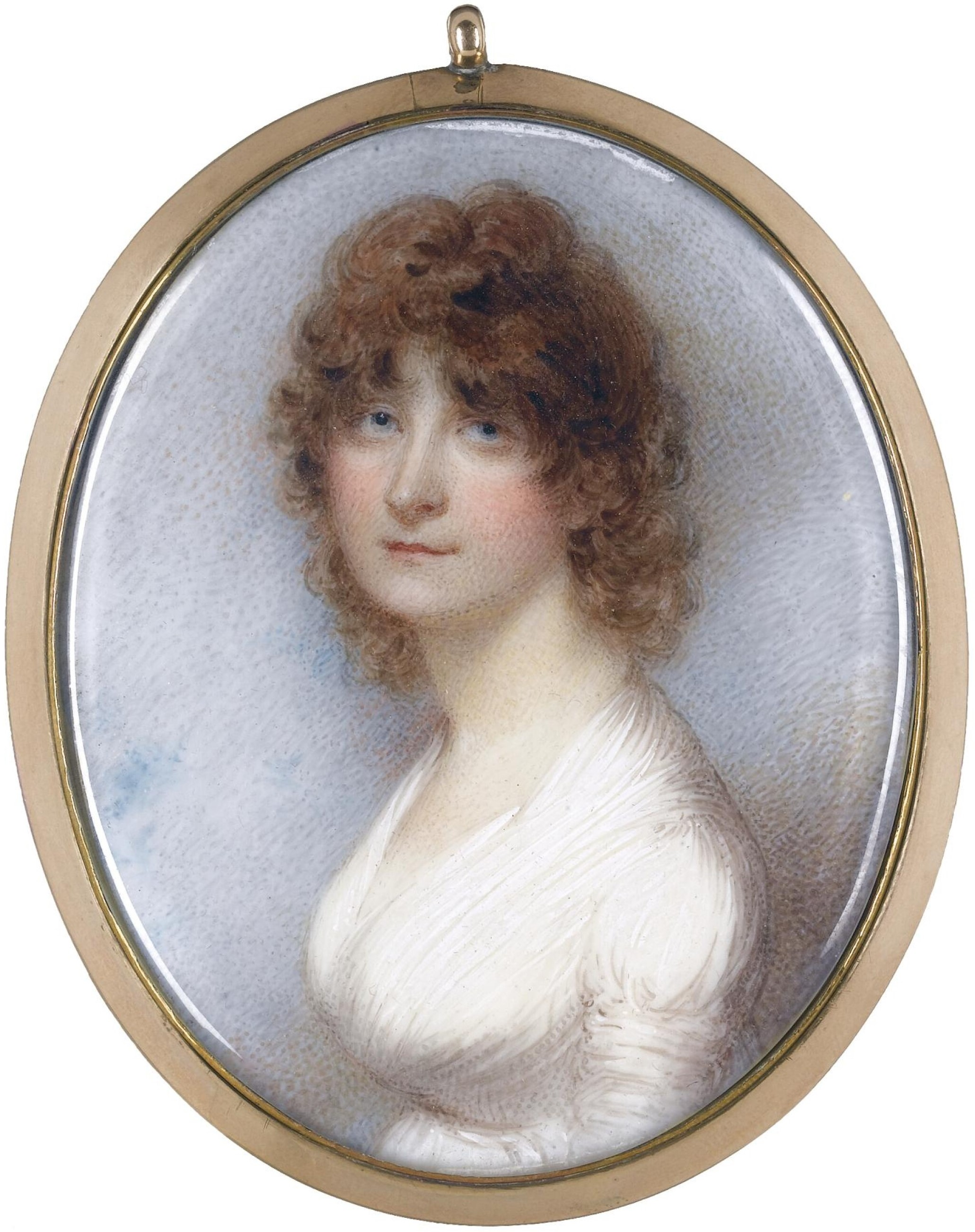
Julia Storer, called 'Mrs Johnstone', portrait by William Wood, 1799

The Confessions of Julia Johnstone was published in 1825. Publisher John Joseph Stockdale was of the opinion that there was a ghostwriter, Jack Mitford. Mitford had been discharged from the navy a decade earlier, and was by this time an alcoholic.

Julia Johnstone was the assumed name of Julia Storer (born 1777). She was connected to the court, but became a courtesan. She claimed an early relationship with the young George "Beau" Brummell, from around 1794. Her parents were Thomas James Storer (1747–1792) (as John James in Kelly), and his wife Elizabeth Proby, daughter of John Proby, 1st Baron Carysfort, and maid-of-honour to Charlotte of Mecklenburg-Strelitz, the Queen. The Brummells and Storers both had grace and favour apartments in Hampton Court Palace, William Brummell being private secretary to Lord North.

According to a Sotheby's catalogue note, "Whilst Julia was staying with the Cottin family as a lady's companion, she became the mistress of Colonel Josiah Cottin [...] and assumed the false name 'Mrs Johnstone'". The miniature painter William Wood made a pair of paintings of the couple, in 1800. Colonel and Mrs Cottin (Lavinia) had a Hampton Court apartment (Apartment 2, Suite XXI) from 1797; while George Brummell was brought up in Apartment 10, Suite XVIII with his father, who died in 1794. The "Hon. Mrs. Storer" had Apartment 7, Suite XIX from 1782 to the end of her life. (The reference only identifies her by the courtesy title, and tentatively suggests a later marriage to Francis Willis, which would have been in 1804.)

There are inconsistencies in versions of the affair, particularly in the record for apartments in the Palace, taking Josiah Cottin to be the "Colonel Cotton" of the 10th Light Dragoons of the Confessions; and with the timeline authors give for the seduction of Julia Storer by Cottin. If that seduction occurred around her 16th birthday, namely in 1793, it would not have been in the apartment granted to the Cottins in 1797. As Kelly notes, there is an independent account given of the affair by Harriette Wilson, initially a friend of Julia, and later putatively an enemy, the Confessions appearing later than Wilson's Memoirs of 1820, with the full title appending In contradiction to the fables of Harriette Wilson. Some of Wilson's affair with the Member of Parliament Richard Meyler, to 1816, took place at Storer's home.

Julia Storer became pregnant, causing a court scandal. She had one brother, Anthony Gilbert Storer (1782–1818). According to the account in Kelly, "Colonel Cotton" was the father, and Anthony challenged him to a duel. Julia was banished by her family. Cotton, who had a large family with Lavinia, set Julia up in Primrose Hill, and had five more children with her, being known as "Mr Johnstone" in the second family. He eventually left Julia, who moved in with Harriette Wilson. She took up again with Beau Brummell around 10 years after he had been the boy next door.
