= 1645 in art =

Events from the year 1645 in art.

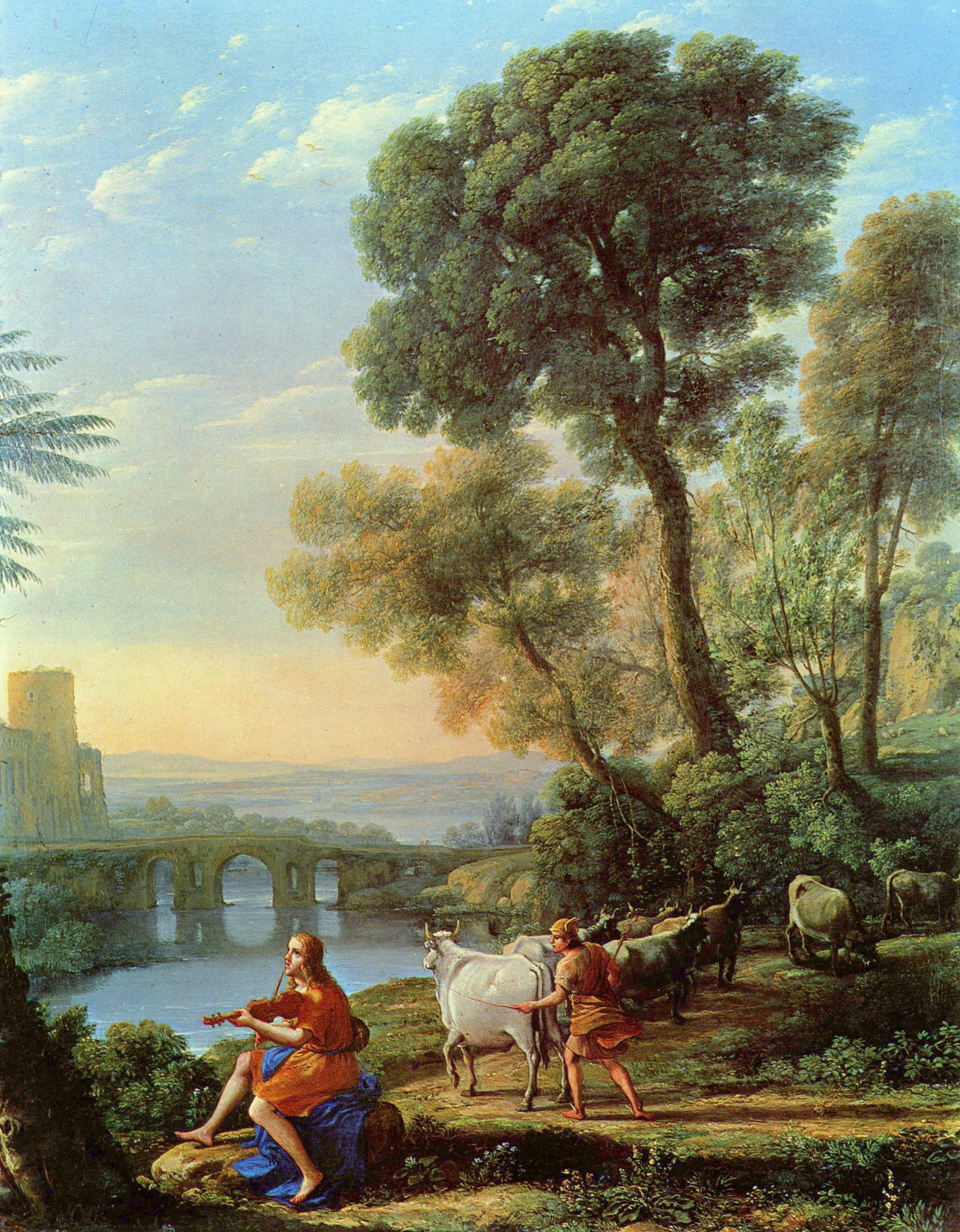
Landscape with Apollo and Mercury by Claude.

== Events ==
- (unknown)

== Works ==
=== Paintings ===
- Claude Lorrain - Landscape with Apollo and Mercury
- William Dobson
  - The Painter with Sir Charles Cottrell and another (approx. date)
  - Portrait of Endymion Porter
  - Prince Rupert, Colonel William Legge and Colonel John Russell
- Rembrandt
  - Girl at a Window
  - Holy Family
  - Portrait of an Old Man
  - Self-portrait
- Salvator Rosa - Philosophy (approx. date)
- Diego Velázquez - Portrait of Sebastián de Morra (approx. date)

=== Sculpture ===
- Gianlorenzo Bernini - Truth Unveiled by Time

== Births ==
- January 11 - Matthias Rauchmiller, German sculptor active in Vienna (died 1686)
- August 30 - Giuseppe Avanzi, Italian painter of the Baroque period (died 1718)
- September - Romeyn de Hooghe, Dutch Baroque engraver and caricaturist (died 1708)
- September 14 - Jeremiah Dummer, American silversmith and portrait painter (died 1718)
- October 26 - Aert de Gelder, Dutch painter in the tradition of Rembrandt's late style (died 1727)
- December 6 – Maria de Dominici, Maltese sculptor and painter (died 1703)
- date unknown
  - Giovanni Antonio Fumiani, Italian painter of the Baroque period (died 1710)
  - François de Troy, French painter, father of Jean-François de Troy (died 1730)
  - Carlo Girolamo Bersotti, Italy painter of the Baroque period, specialized in painting still lifes (died unknown)
  - Sebastiano Taricco, Italian painter of the Baroque period (died 1710)
  - Jean-Baptiste Théodon, French sculptor (died 1713)
- probable
  - Giulio Giacinto Avellino, Italian painter (died 1700)
  - Urbano Romanelli, Italian painter in Rome and in churches at Velletri (died 1682)
  - Andrea Lanzani, Italian painter for the Habsburg court (died 1712)

== Deaths ==
- April 11 - Ferraù Fenzoni, Italian painter active in Todi
- April 14 - Shi Kefa, Chinese government official and calligrapher (born 1601)
- May - Ambrosius Bosschaert II, Dutch flower painter (born 1609)
- July 12 - Luciano Borzone, Italian painter of the Baroque period with an antique style (born 1590)
- September - Julius Porcellis, Dutch marine artist (born c.1610)
- December 12 - Giovanni Bernardino Azzolini or Mazzolini or Asoleni, Italian painter (born 1572)
- date unknown
  - Juan Alfonso Abril, Spanish painter active mainly in his native Valladolid (born unknown)
  - Christoffel van den Berghe, Dutch painter (born 1590)
  - Hans Gillisz. Bollongier, Dutch still life painter (born 1600)
  - Paolo Domenico Finoglia, Italian painter (born 1590)
  - Sebastiano Ghezzi, Italian painter and architect (born 1580)
  - Jacob van der Heyden, Flemish Baroque painter, sculptor and engraver (born 1573)
  - Francisco Varela, Spanish Baroque painter (born 1580)
  - Wen Zhenheng, Chinese Ming dynasty scholar, painter, and landscape garden designer (born 1585)
