= Ognissanti, Venice =

16th-century Roman Catholic church in Venice, Italy

Chiesa di Ognissanti Church of Ognissanti
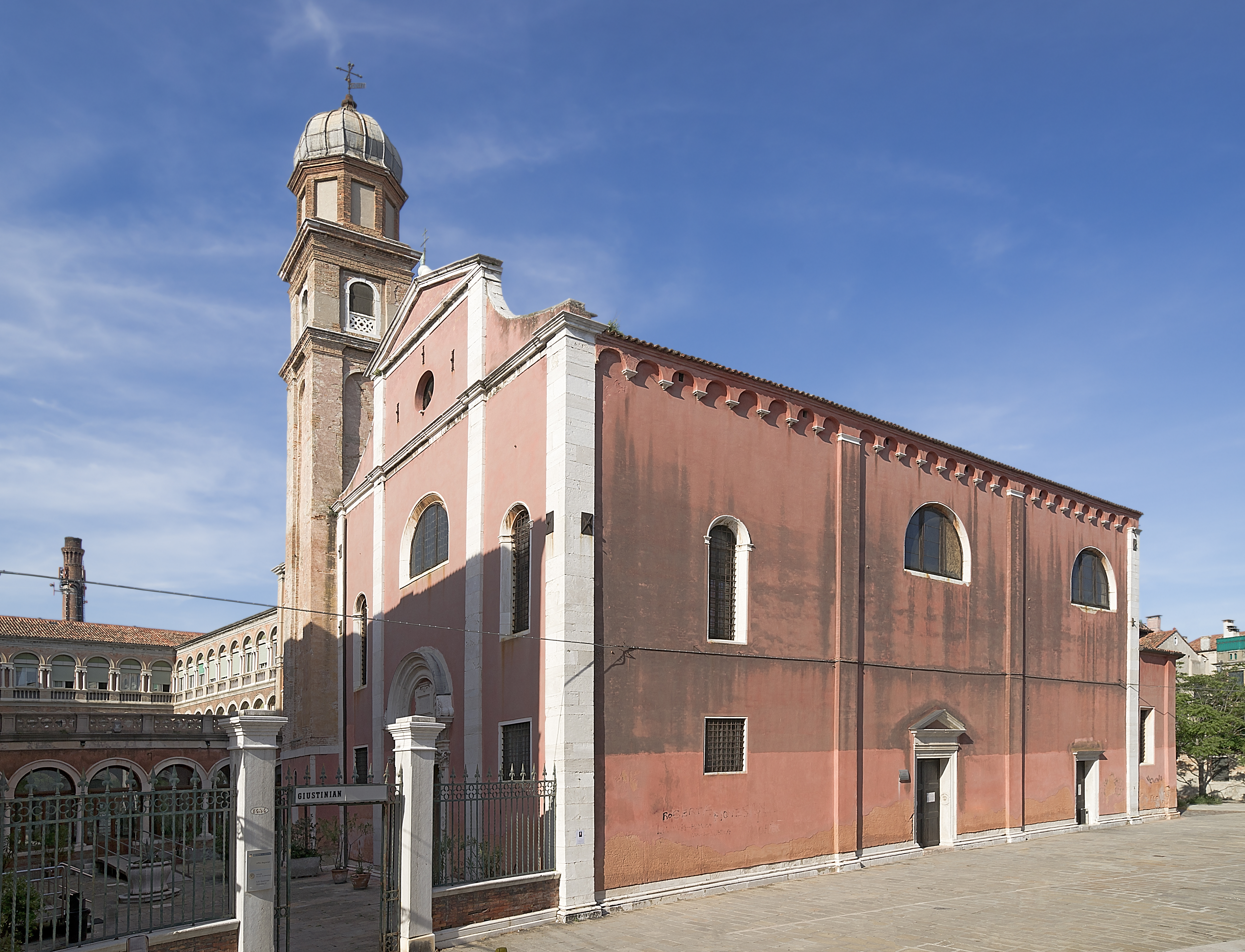

- Location within Venice Location within Italy

Religion
- Affiliation: Roman Catholic
- Year consecrated: 1586
- Status: Active

Location
- Location: Dorsoduro, Venice, Italy
- Coordinates: 45°25′52.07″N 12°19′23.88″E

Architecture
- Type: Church
- Style: Renaissance
- Groundbreaking: 1505

Ognissanti (Italian: Chiesa di Ognissanti) is a 16th-century Roman Catholic church located in the Dorsoduro sestiere of the Italian city of Venice.

== History ==
In the 15th century, the area of the current church housed a monastery of Cistercian nuns who had moved here from Torcello, the nearby islands now largely uninhabitable. In 1472 a hospice was built with an annexed small church, which is shown in the plan of Venice made by Jacopo de' Barbari. This was replaced from 1505 by the current building, consecrated in 1586.

The church and the nunnery were suppressed by Napoleon Bonaparte in 1807 and left abandoned until Giovan Battista Giustinian turned them into a convalescent facility for elderly people. Later the monastery became a hospital, active until the mid-1990s, while the church, contained in the former's perimeter, was used for religious functions for recovered people.

It now forms part of the Giustinian Hospital.

== Description ==
The church's façade is divided into three vertical sectors, corresponding to the nave and aisles of the interior. The portal has a simple structure, flanked and surmounted by arched, large windows.

The church has a bell tower with a top in Baroque top.

== Description ==
The high facade is divided vertically into three. The church is flanked on the left side by the bell tower. Internally, the church has a single nave with no aisle. There is a large gallery for the nuns at the back of the church.

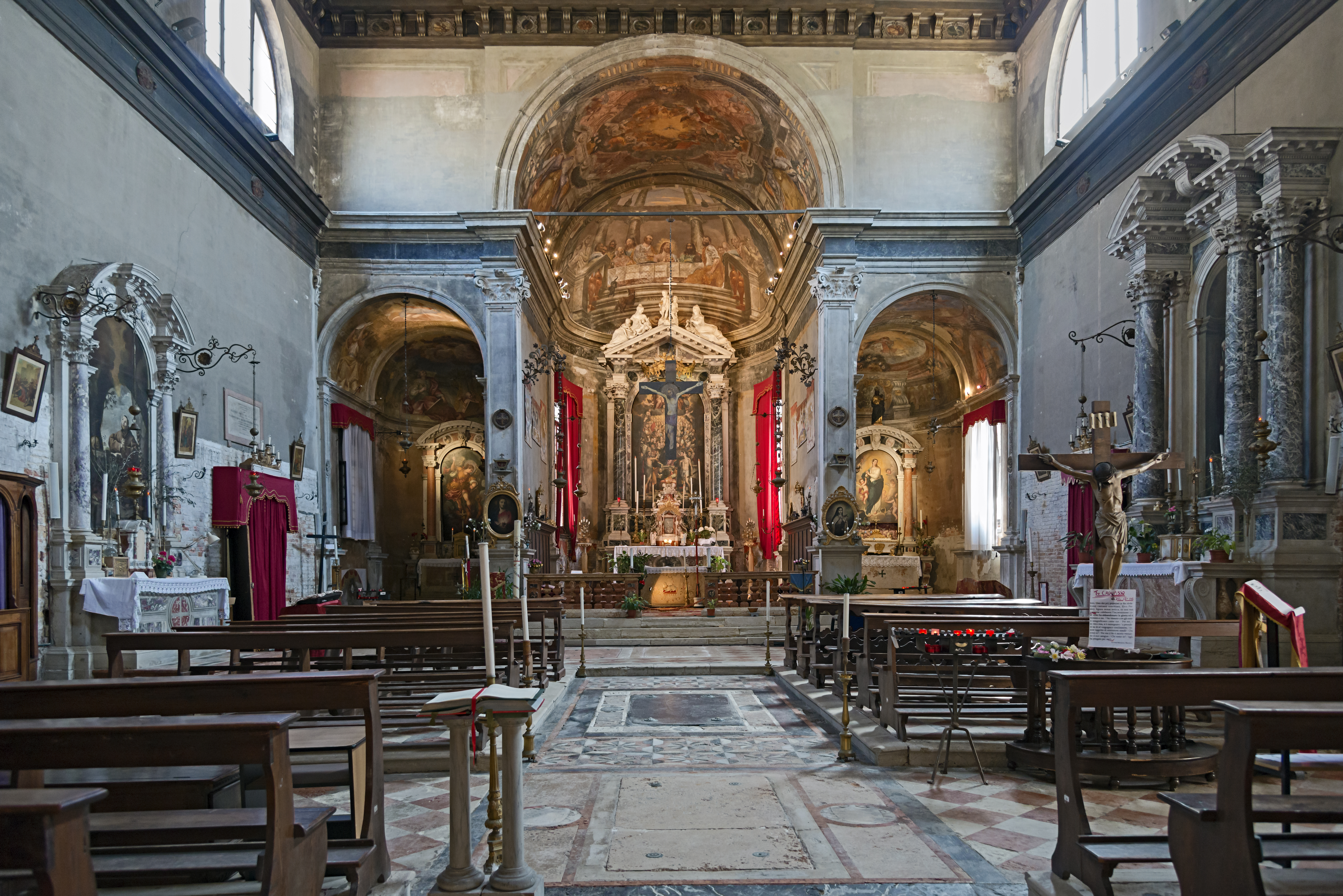
General view of the interior of the church

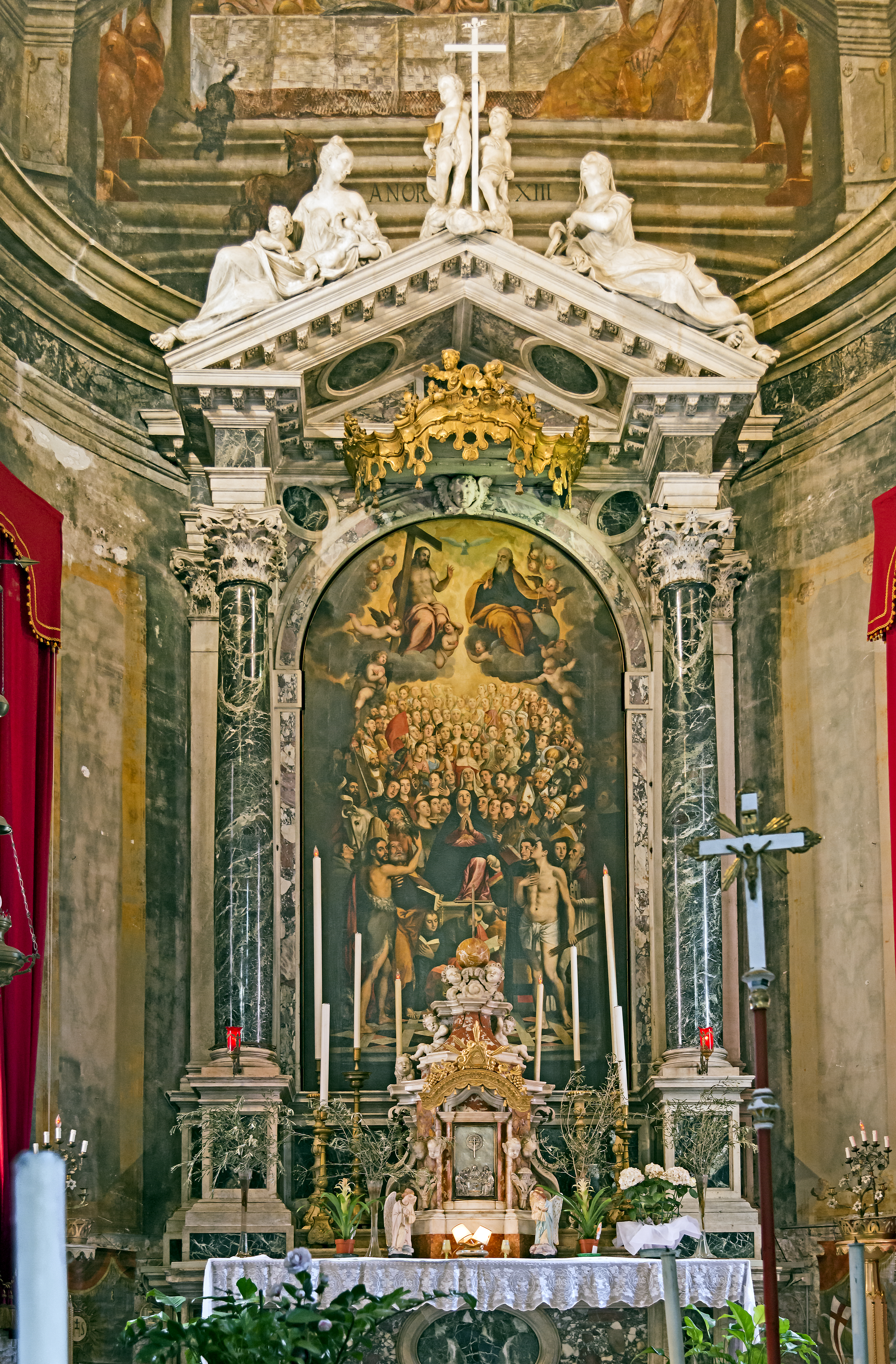
The high altar

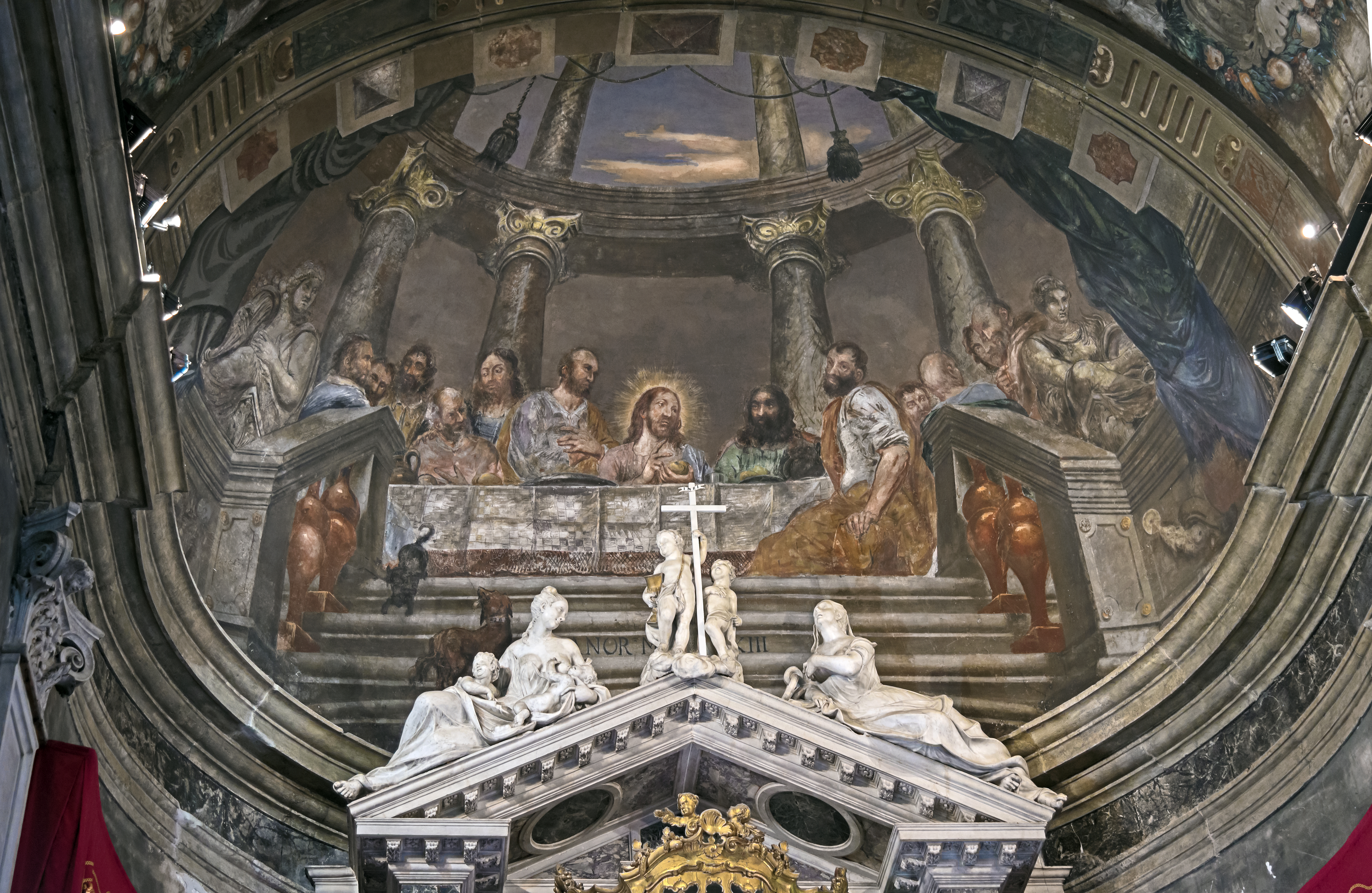
Fresco in the apse.

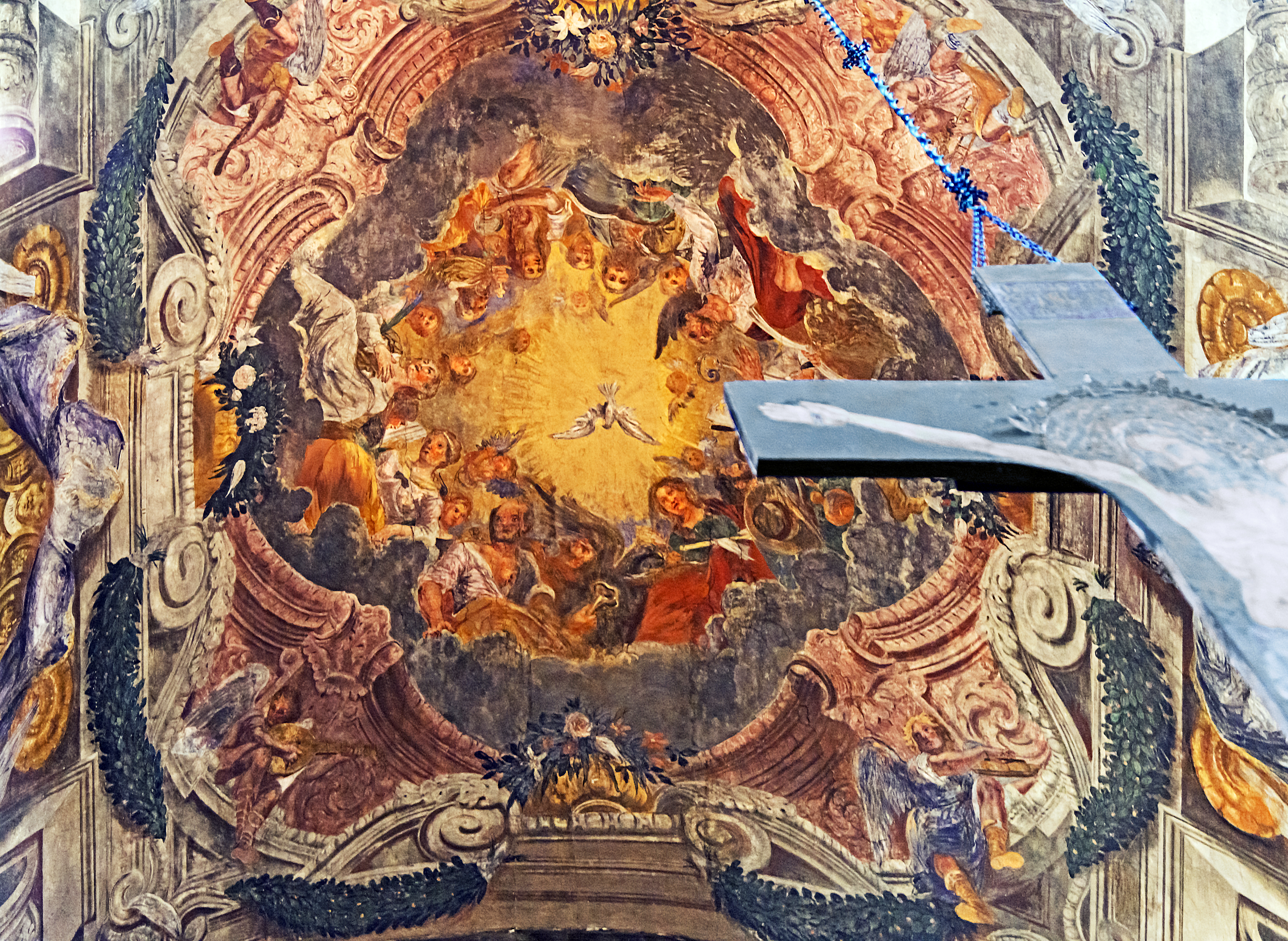
Vault above the altar.

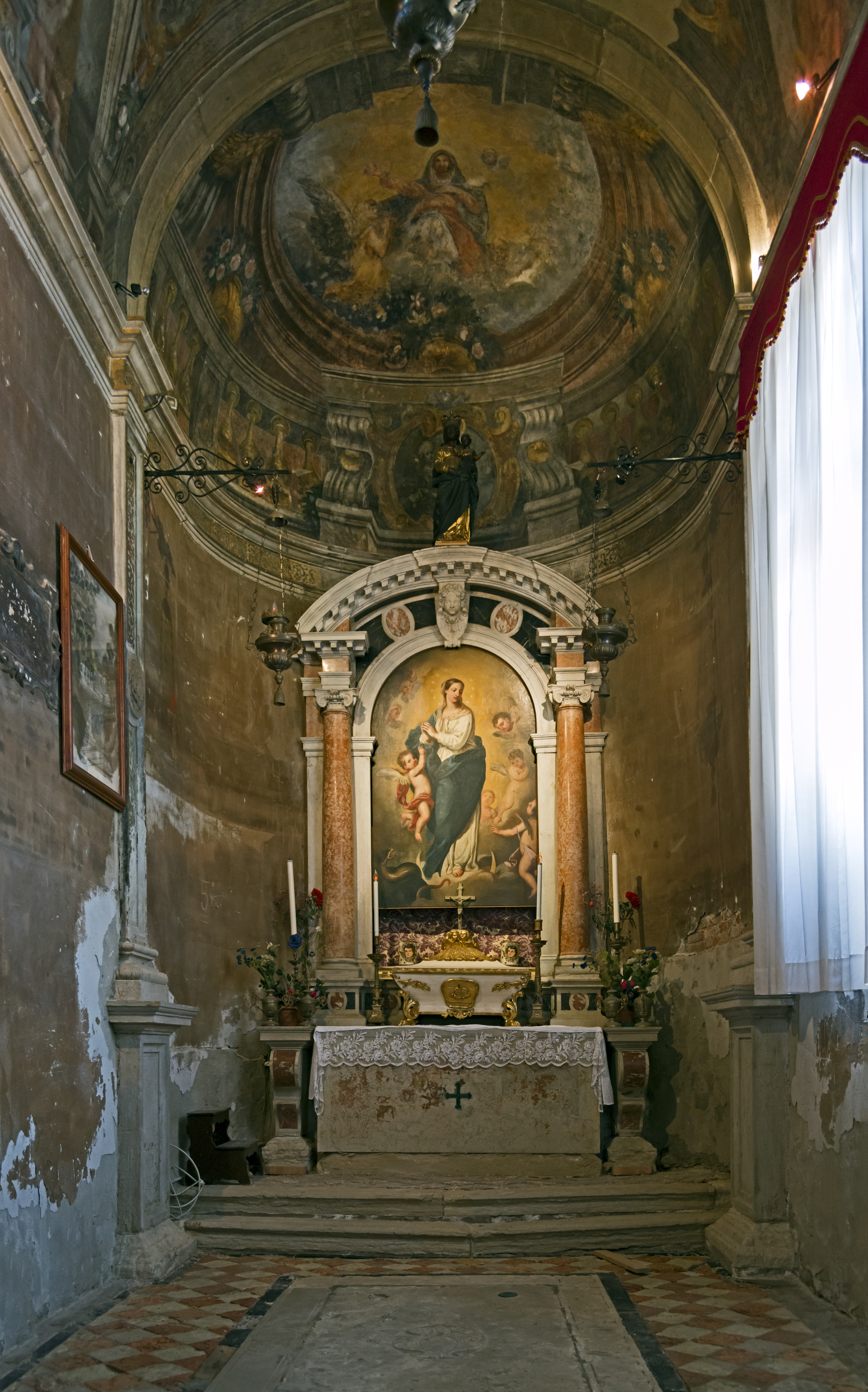
Chapel to the right of the choir.

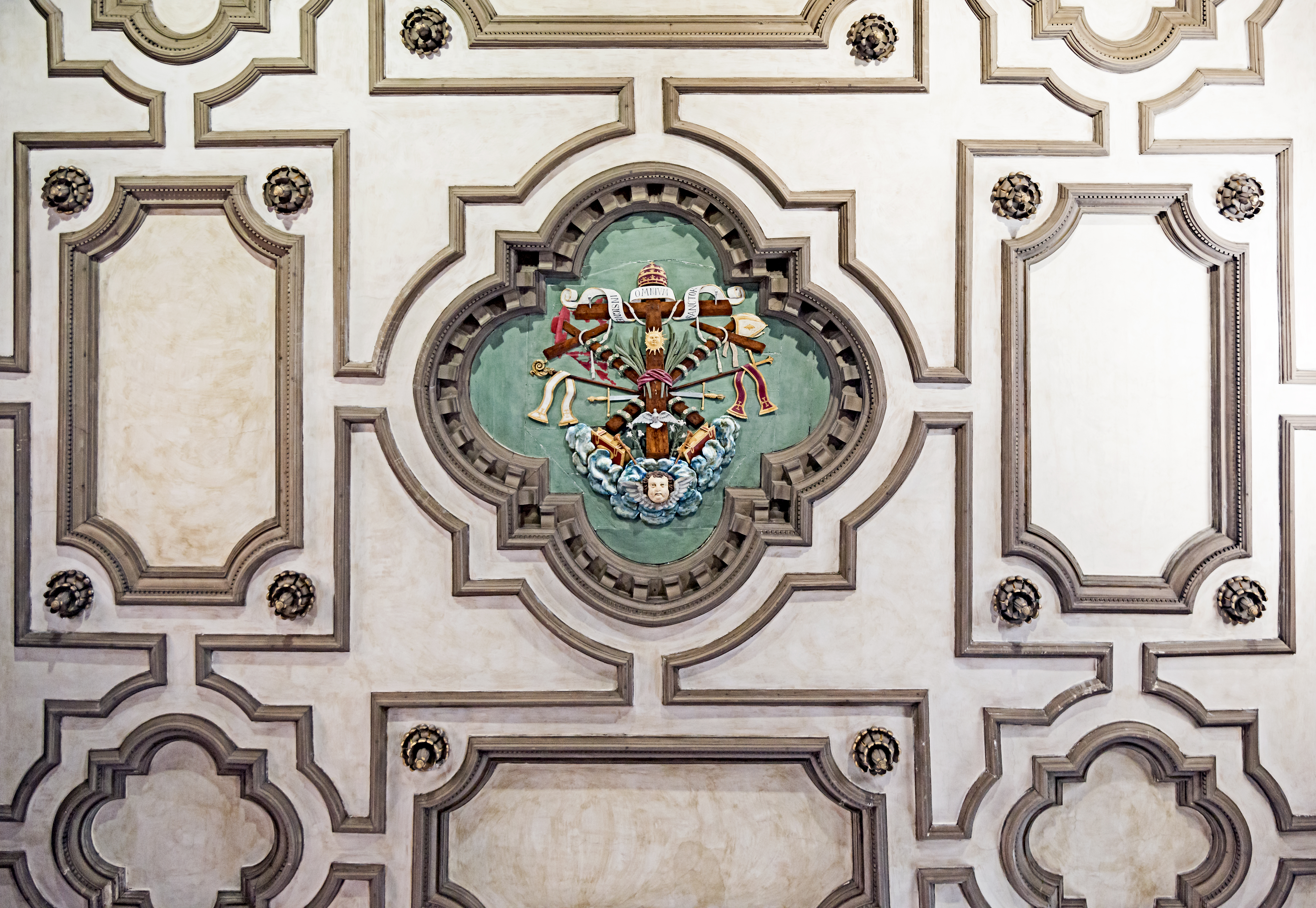
Ceiling of the nave.

== Works of Art ==
On 13 March 1673 Agostino Litterini received an important commission from Abbess Teodora Sansonio for the decoration of the main chapel in collaboration with the painter Bologna Giacomo Grassi.

Litterini painted a fresco of The Last Supper in the apse. He also painted The Glory of Paradise in the vault of the same chapel. Because of the stylistic similarities, it is possible to assume the same painters worked on the frescoes in the two side chapels of the presbytery. In the left one, which belongs to the Michiel family, Litterini painted God the Father at the back of the chapel and four Virtues in the vault. In the Battaglia Chapel, on the right, are the Virgin in Glory and two angels bearing flowers and fruit.

=== In Place ===
- In the apse above the choir is a fresco of The Last Supper by Agostino Litterini and Giacomo Grassi.
- In the vault above the altar is a fresco of The Glory of Paradise by Agostino Litterini and Giacomo Grassi.
- The altarpiece is The Trinity and All Saints by Marco Moro.

=== Moved or Lost ===
- Carlo Ridolfi painted a Visitation - a painting which harmonised colours "in a completely new way". This is now in the store of the Accademia Gallery
- The Baptism of Christ (lost) by Giacomo Alberelli
- Coronation of the Virgin by Paolo Veronese (c. 1586), now in the Accademia

=== Unknown Status ===
- Pietro Muttoni painted a huge composition in the church.
- The Slaughter of the Innocents by Pietro Liberi.
- Morto Riuscitato (The Resurrection?) by Carlo Sacchi

== Bibliography ==
- Umberto Franzoi, Dina Di Stefano, The Churches of Venice (in Italian), Alfieri, Venice, 1976
- Giampaolo Onesto, Interventi di restauro nella Chiesa di Ognissanti a Venezia, Padova, Il Prato, 2001, ISBN 8887243492.
- Franzoi, Umberto; Di Stefano, Dina (1976). Le chiese di Venezia. Venice: Alfieri editore.
