= Endymion Porter =

English courtier and diplomat (1587–1649)

Endymion Porter MP JP
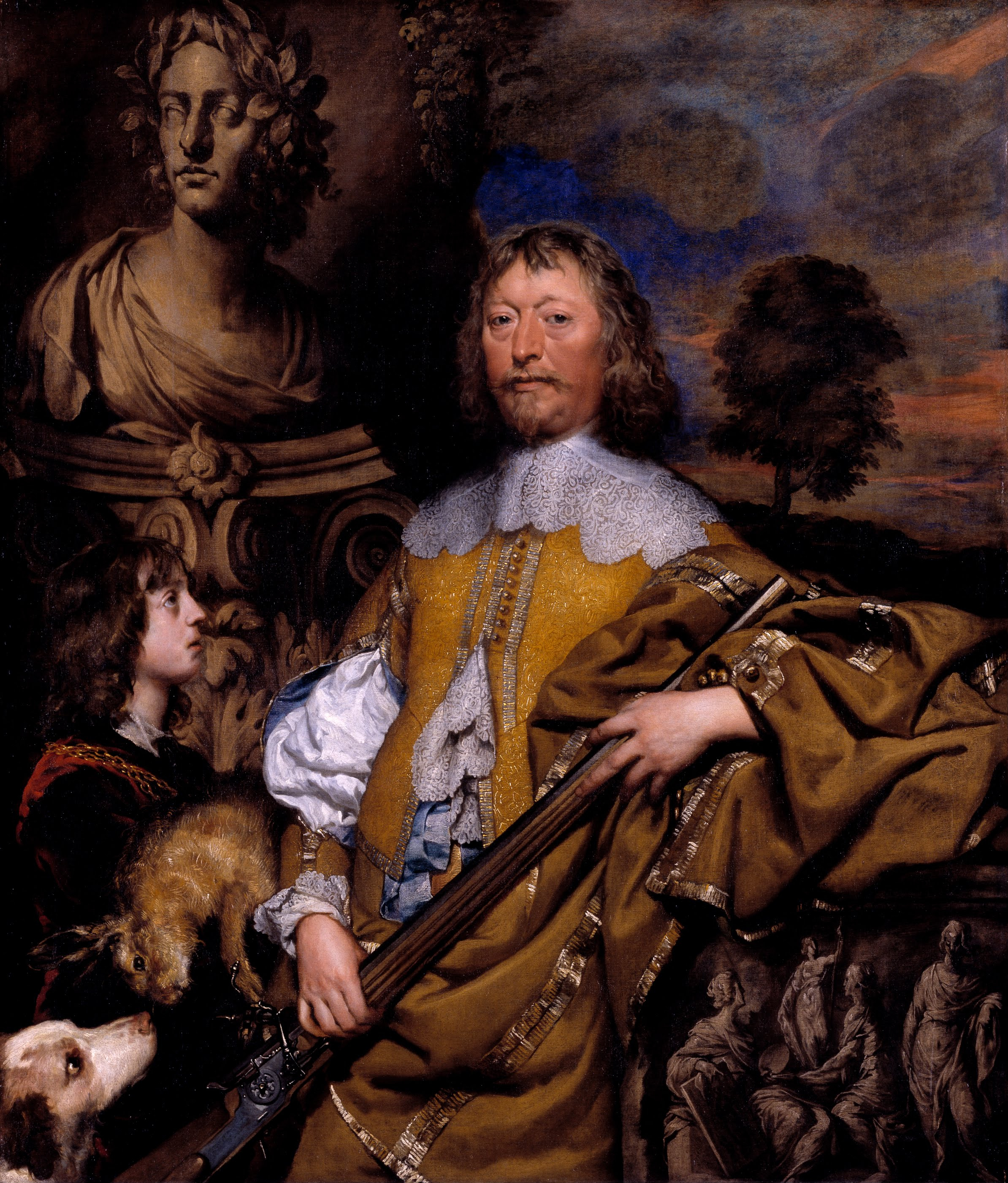
- Portrait of Endymion Porter by William Dobson c. 1642-1645

Member of Parliament for Droitwich
- In office November 1640 – March 1643 (suspended)

Personal details
- Born: 1587 Aston-sub-Edge, near Mickleton, Gloucestershire
- Died: 20 August 1649 (aged 62) London
- Resting place: St Martin-in-the-Fields
- Spouse: Olivia Boteler (1619-his death)

Endymion Porter, c. 1587 to 20 August 1649, was a courtier from Mickleton, Gloucestershire. Although never a political figure, he acquired significant influence first from his association with the Duke of Buckingham, then Charles I, who made him a groom of the bedchamber.

A minor poet and patron of the arts, he introduced painters such as Peter Paul Rubens and Van Dyck to the court.

== Personal details ==
Endymion Porter was born c. 1587 at the family home of Aston-sub-Edge, near Mickleton, Gloucestershire, eldest of eight children of Edmund (d.1623), and Angela Porter. His grandfather, Giles, married a noblewoman from Castile in the 1560s, and Porter had a large number of Spanish relatives.

In 1619, he married Olivia Boteler (d. 1663). They had twelve children, seven of whom survived into adulthood, George (1621-1683), Charles (1623-1640), Philip (1628-1655), Mary (1629-1643), Lettice (1631-?), Thomas (1636-1680), and James (1638-1702).

== Career ==
In 1605, he accompanied his grandfather to Spain and spent two years as a page in the household of the Duke of Olivares, later chief advisor to Philip II of Spain. He returned to England in 1612, where his Spanish language skills eventually led to a position with the Duke of Buckingham. Through this connection, in 1619 he married Buckingham's relative Olivia Boteler, and in 1621 was appointed groom of the bedchamber to Charles I.

In October 1622 he was sent to negotiate concerning the affairs of the Electorate of the Palatinate and the proposed "Spanish Match" of the Prince of Wales with the Infanta. He accompanied Charles and Buckingham on their foolhardy expedition in 1623, acted as their interpreter, and was included in the consequent attack made by Lord Bristol on Buckingham in 1626.

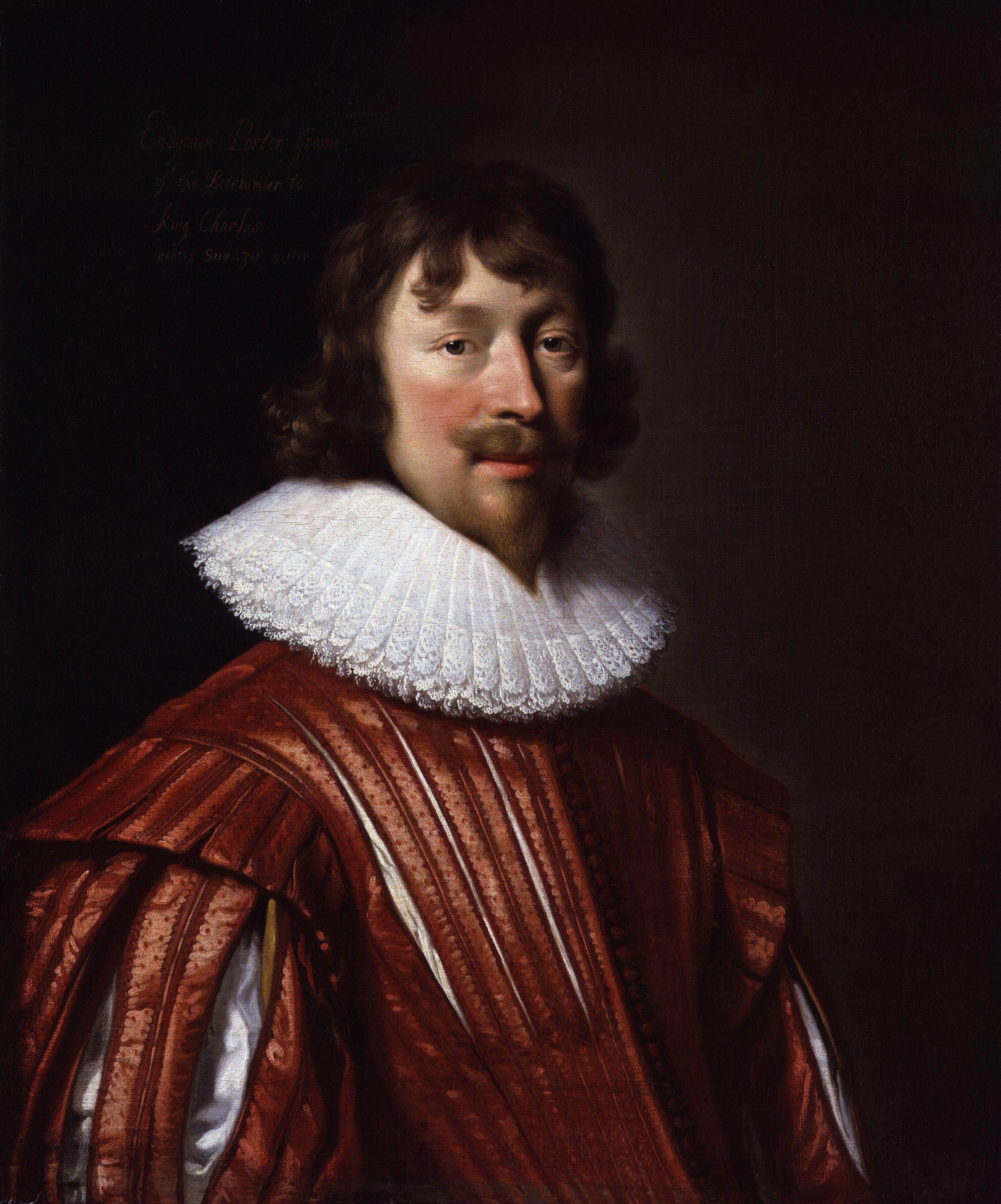
Portrait of Endymion Porter, by Daniel Mytens, 1627

In October 1622 he was sent to negotiate concerning the affairs of the Electorate of the Palatinate and the proposed "Spanish Match" of the Prince of Wales with the Infanta. He accompanied Charles and Buckingham on their foolhardy expedition in 1623, acted as their interpreter, and was included in the consequent attack made by Lord Bristol on Buckingham in 1626.

In 1628, Porter was employed as envoy to Spain to negotiate for peace, and in 1634 on a mission to the Netherlands to the Cardinal-Infante Ferdinand. He was one of the promoters of the 1635 Courteen association.

During the Civil War Porter remained a constant and faithful servant of the king. He was with him during the two Scottish campaigns, attended him again on the visit to Scotland in August 1641, and followed Charles on his last departure from London in 1642, receiving the nominal command of a regiment, and sitting in the Royalist parliament at Oxford in 1643.

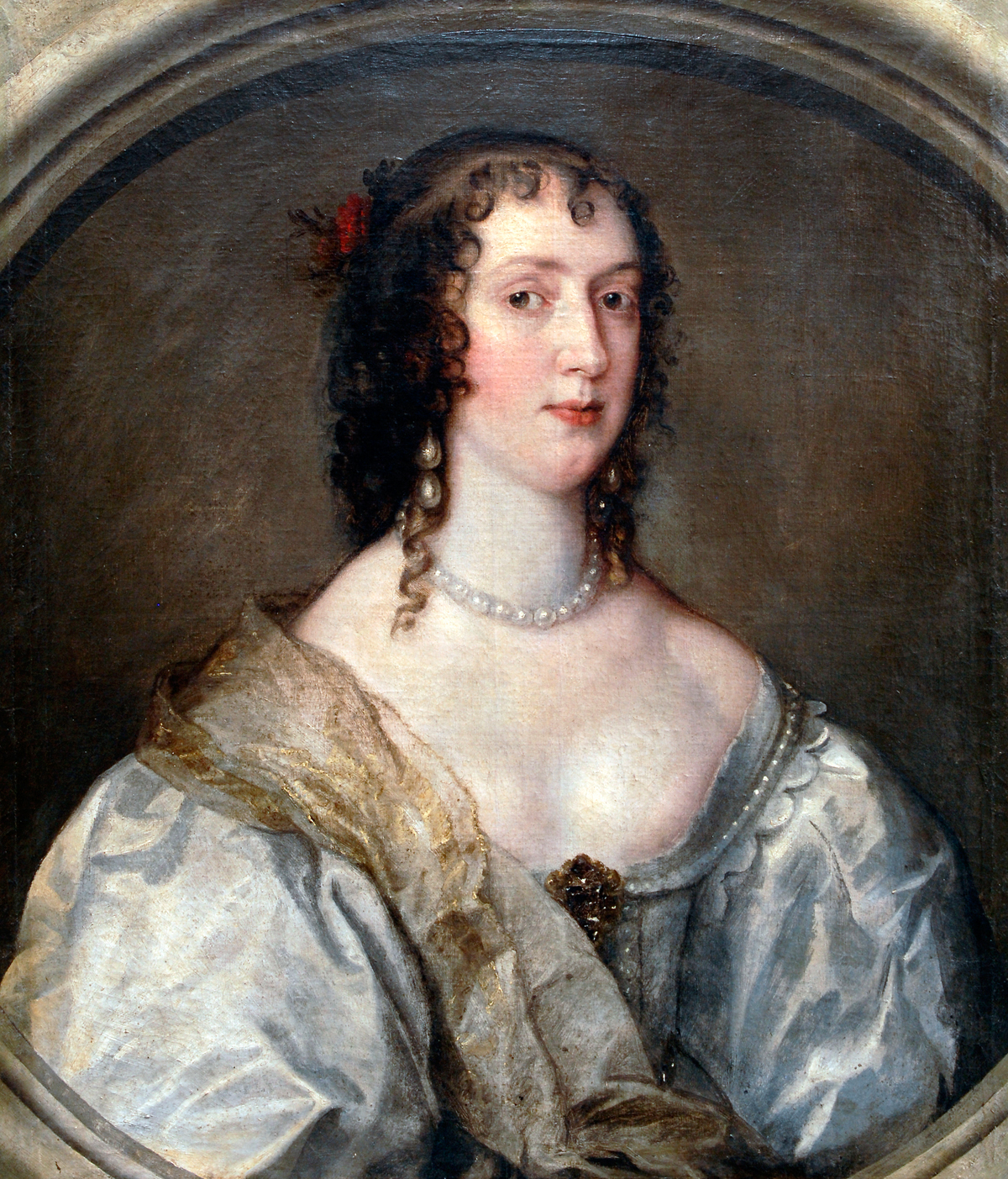
Olivia Porter, by Anthony van Dyck

He had, however, little faith in the king's measures. "His Majesty's businesses," he wrote in 1641, "run in their wonted channel—subtle designs of gaining the popular opinion and weak executions for the up-holding of monarchy." His fidelity to Charles was of a personal, not of a political nature. "My duty and loyalty have taught me to follow my king," he declared, "and by the grace of God nothing shall divert me from it." This devotion to the king, the fact that he was the agent and protégé of Buckingham, and that his wife Olivia, daughter of John Boteler, 1st Baron Boteler of Bramfield, and niece of Buckingham, was a zealous Roman Catholic, drew upon him the hostility of the opposite faction. Olivia was a lady-in-waiting to Queen consort Henrietta Maria.

As member of the Long Parliament, in which he sat as member for Droitwich, he was one of the minority of 59 who voted against Strafford's attainder, and was, in consequence, proclaimed a "betrayer of his country."

He had been Captain of the St Martin-in-the-Fields company of the Westminster Trained Bands but was among the Royalist officers purged from the regiment on 24 January 1642 after a dispute over guarding the Houses of Parliament.

On 15 February 1642, he was voted one of the dangerous counsellors, and specially excepted from pardon on 4 October and in the treaties of peace negotiated subsequently, while on 10 March 1643 he was excluded from parliament.

== Abroad ==
Porter was also implicated in the army plot; he assisted Glamorgan in illegally putting the great seal to the commission to negotiate with the Irish in 1644, and was charged with having, in the same manner, affixed the great seal of Scotland, then temporarily in his keeping, to that of O'Neill in 1641, and of having incurred some responsibility for the Irish rebellion.

Towards the end of 1645, when the king's cause was finally lost, Porter abandoned England, and resided successively in France, Brussels and Antwerp, where he was reduced to great poverty, and the Netherlands. The property which he had accumulated during the tenure of his various appointments, by successful commercial undertakings and by favours of the court, was now for the most part either confiscated or encumbered.

He returned to England in 1649, after the king's death, and was allowed to compound for what remained of it. He died shortly afterwards, and was buried on 10 August 1649 at St Martin-in-the-Fields, leaving as a special charge in his will to his sons and descendants to "observe and respect the family of my Lord Duke of Buckingham, deceased, to whom I owe all the happiness I had in the world". He left five sons, George, James, Charles, Philip and Thomas, who all played conspicuous, if not all creditable, parts in the history of the time.

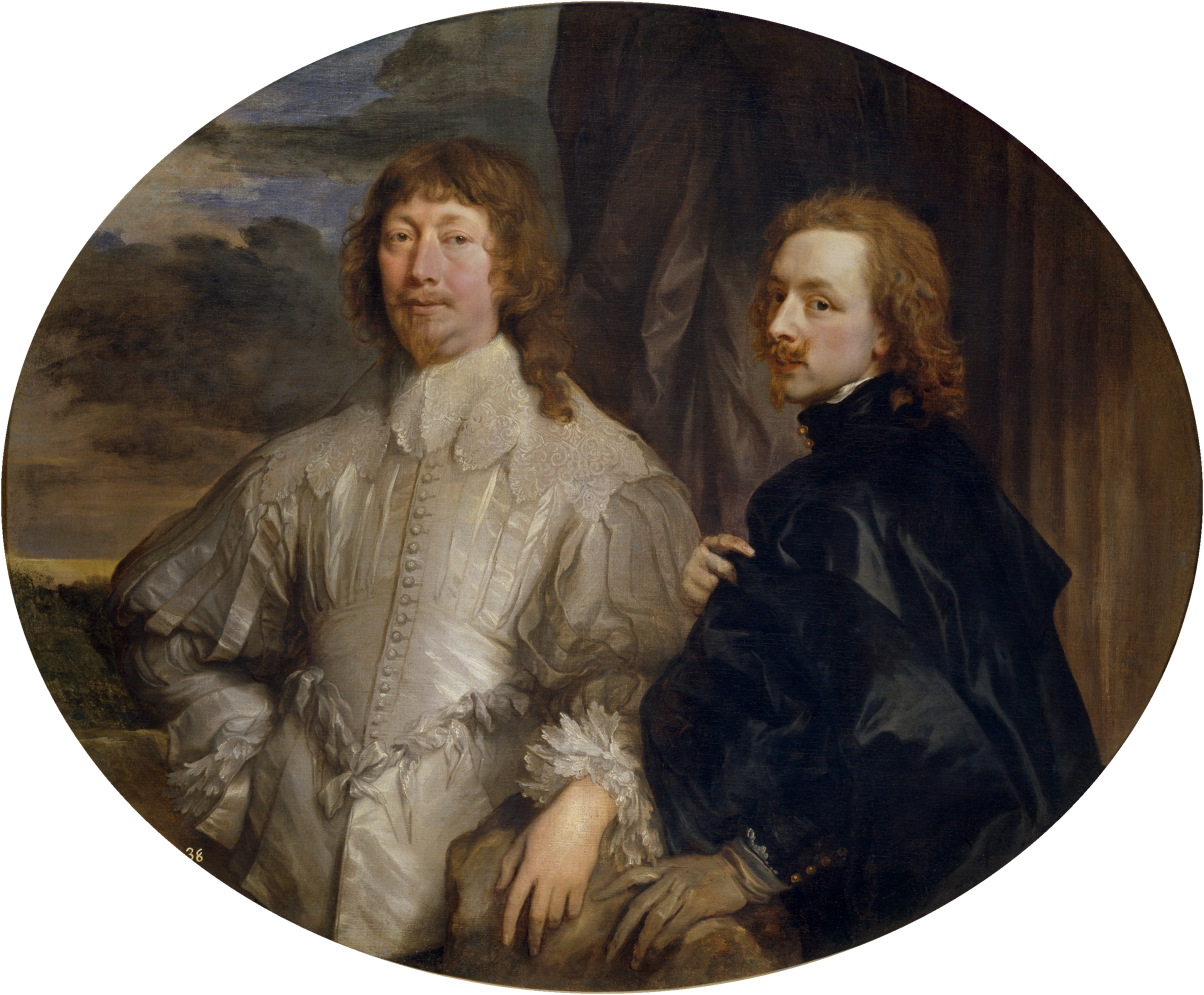
Double portrait of Sir Endymion and Anthony van Dyck, by Anthony van Dyck

== Arts ==
According to Wood, Porter was "beloved by two kings: James I for his admirable wit and Charles I for his general bearing, brave style, sweet temper, great experience, travels and modern languages". During the period of his prosperity, Porter had gained a great reputation in the world of art and letters. He wrote verses, was a generous patron of Davenant, who especially sang his praises, of Dekker, May, Herrick and Robert Dover, and was included among the 84 "essentials" in Edmund Bolton's "Academy Royal."

He was a judicious collector of pictures, and as the friend of Rubens, Van Dyck, Daniël Mijtens and other painters, and as agent for Charles in his purchases abroad he had a considerable share in forming the king's magnificent collection. He was also instrumental in procuring the Arundel pictures from Spain. In 2013 a painting of his wife by Anthony van Dyck was found to have been undiscovered as a masterpiece in the Bowes Museum in County Durham.

== Sources ==
- Asch, Ronald (2008). "Porter, Endymion". Oxford Dictionary of National Biography (online ed.). Oxford University Press. doi:10.1093/ref:odnb/22562. (Subscription, Wikipedia Library access or UK public library membership required.)
- Huxley, Gervais (1959). Endymion Parker. Chatto, Windus.
