= Self-portrait with Sir Endymion Porter =

1635 painting by Anthony van Dyck

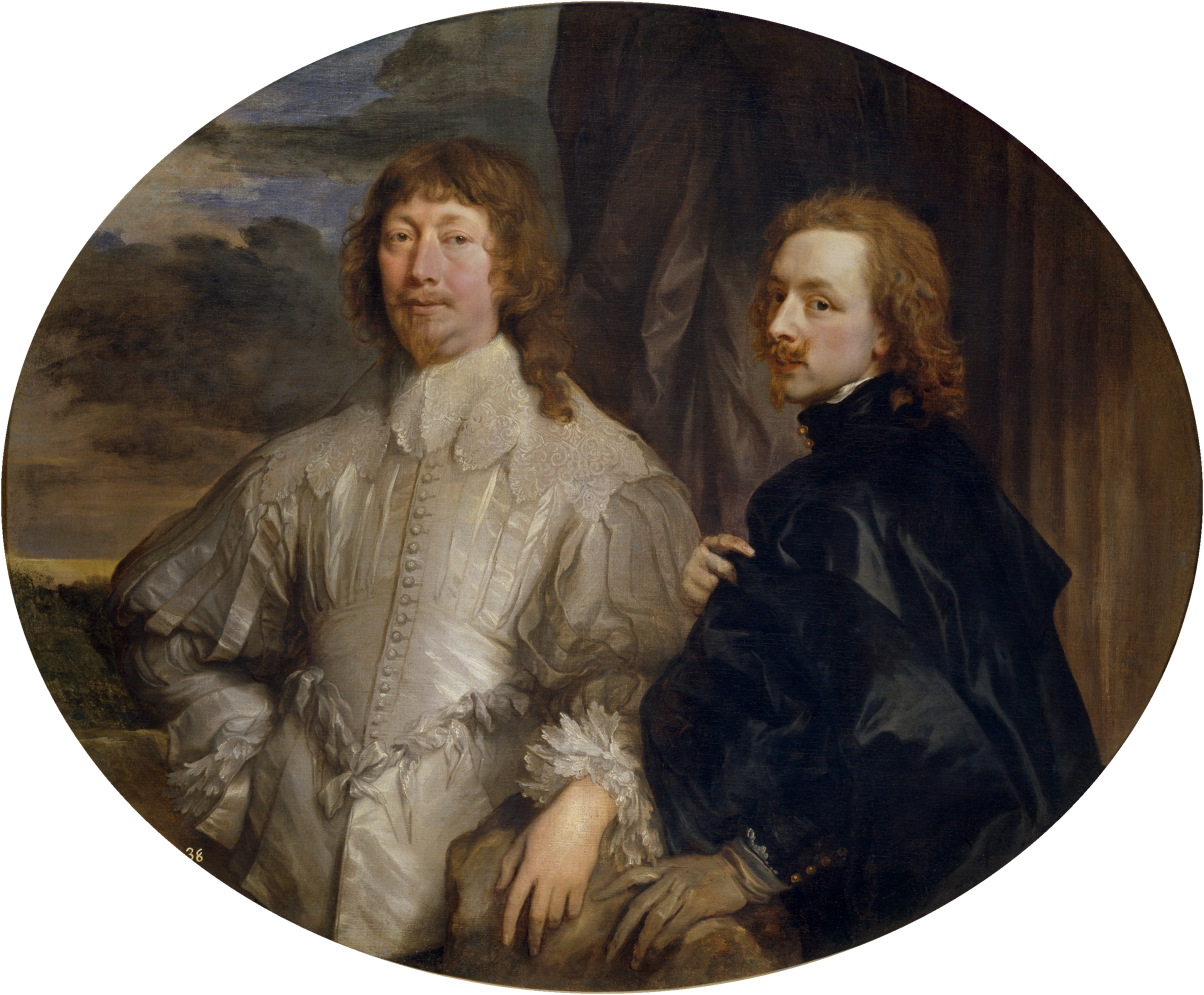

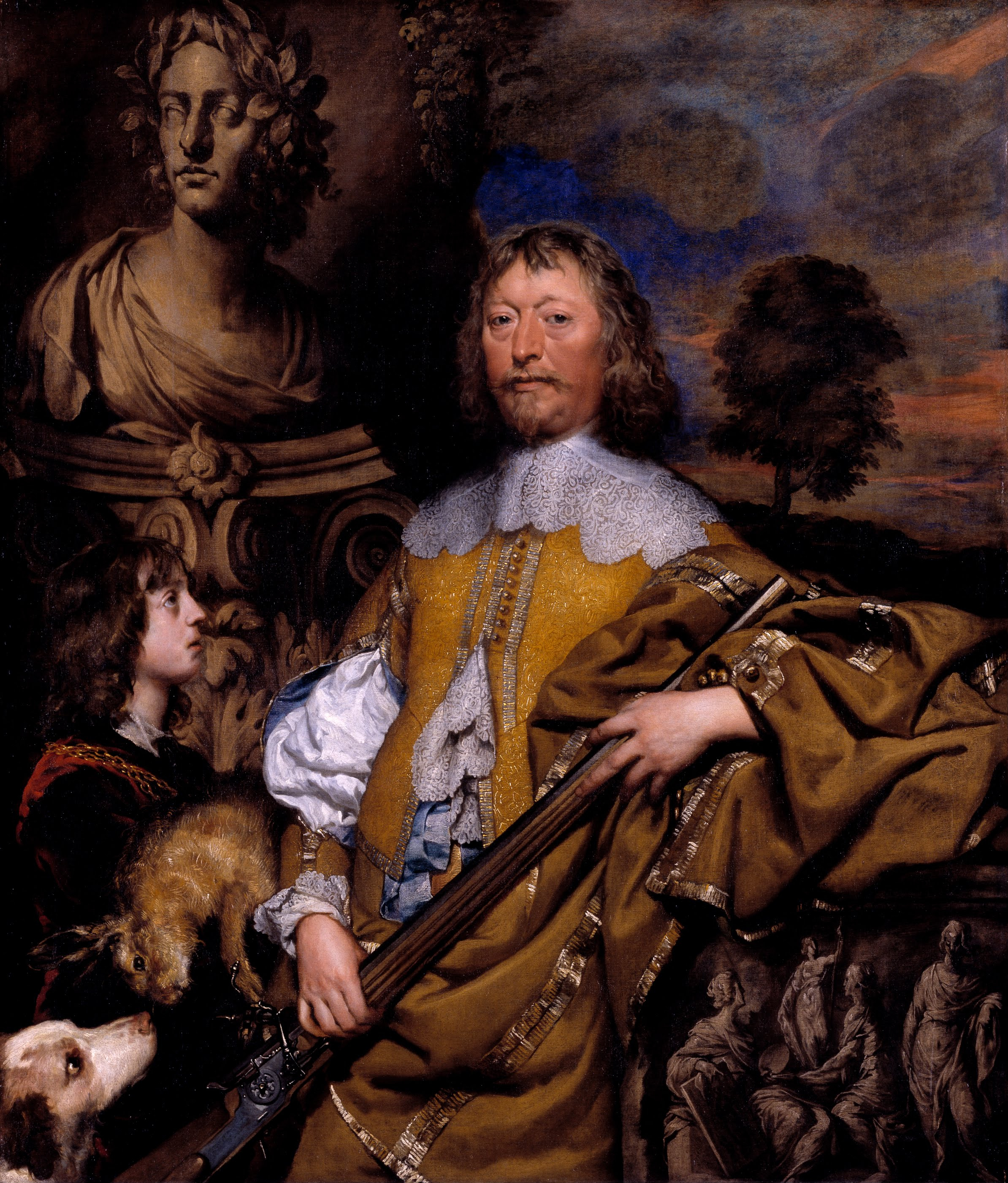
Portrait of Endymion Porter by William Dobson, c.1645

Self-portrait with Sir Endymion Porter is a self-portrait by Anthony van Dyck, showing him with his patron Sir Endymion Porter.

== Painting ==
The painting was produced in 1635 and measures 119 by 127 centimetres (47 in × 50 in). It is now in the Museo del Prado in Madrid, Spain.

It is van Dyck's only self-portrait to include another figure, showing Porter's importance in his life. The pair had first met in 1620, during van Dyck's first stay in London. Porter was Charles I of England's main art dealer, negotiating to acquire the vast art collection of the Duke of Mantua and also collecting art for himself. He also knew Peter Paul Rubens and Orazio Gentileschi. Van Dyck presented the double portrait to Porter himself - it was later acquired by Isabella Farnese, who owned it by 1745, and passed from her collection to the Prado.

== See also ==
- List of paintings by Anthony van Dyck
