= George Porter (Royalist) =

Royalist army officer and courtier (1621–1683)

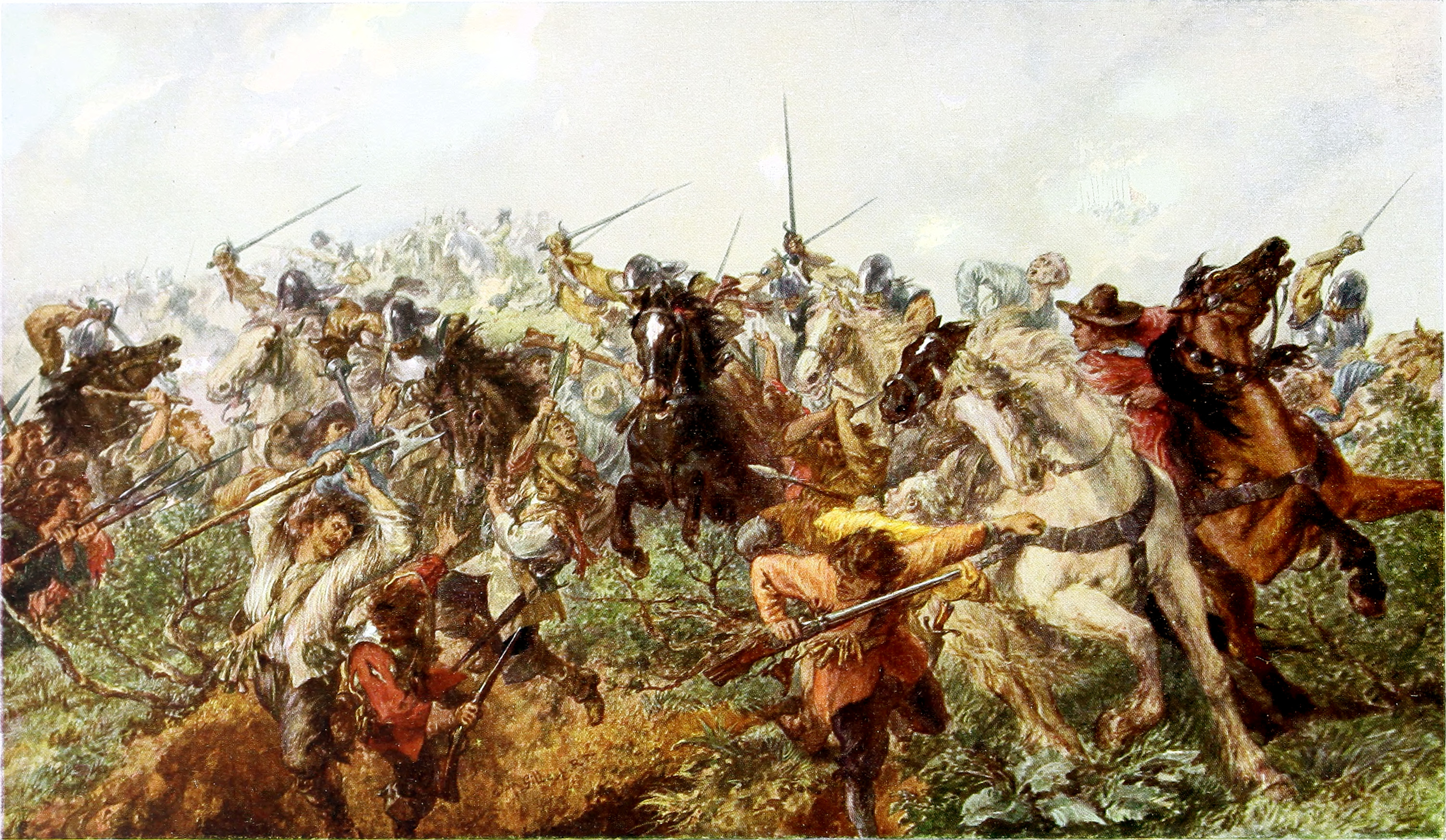
- Battle of Marston Moor July 1644; Porter was wounded and captured

Groom of the Bedchamber
- In office 1677–1683

Personal details
- Born: c. 7 November 1621 Hatfield, Hertfordshire
- Died: 3 October 1683 (aged 61) St Giles, London
- Resting place: St Giles in the Fields
- Spouse: Diana Goring (m. 1646; died 1683)

Military service
- Battles/wars: First English Civil War; Relief of Newark; Battle of Marston Moor (WIA) (POW); Battle of Langport

George Porter, (c. 7 November 1621 – c. 3 October 1683), was a member of the landed gentry, born near Hatfield, Hertfordshire. During the First English Civil War, he rose to the rank of lieutenant-general in the Royalist army, being described however by a colleague as "the best company, but worst officer that ever served the king."

After the 1660 Stuart Restoration, he was appointed gentleman of the privy chamber to Catharine of Braganza, then later Groom of the Bedchamber to Charles II of England. He died in London in October 1683.

== Personal details ==
George Porter was born in his mother's house near Hatfield, Hertfordshire around 7 November 1621, eldest son of Endymion Porter (1587-1649), and his wife Olivia Boteler (d.1663).

On 19 June 1641 Charles I recommended him to the Earl of Ormonde to be allowed to transport a regiment of a thousand of the disbanded soldiers of the Irish army for the service of Spain.

At the start of the Civil War Porter appears to have served under Prince Rupert, and then became commissary-general of horse in the army of the Earl of Newcastle. In March 1644 Porter was engaged in fortifying Lincoln, and at the battle of Marston Moor, where he was wounded, he held the rank of major-general of Newcastle's foot.

Parliament sent Porter to the Tower of London but later allowed him to be exchanged. On his release Porter became lieutenant-general and commander of the horse in the army of George Goring, Lord Goring, in the west of England. Over Goring, he was considered a bad influence. At Ilminster on 9 July 1645, he allowed Goring's cavalry to be surprised and routed by Edward Massey. Goring declared that he deserved to be shot, and a few weeks later told Edward Hyde that he suspected Porter of treachery as well as negligence; his final verdict was that "his brother-in-law was the best company, but the worst officer that ever served the king". Porter then quarrelled with Colonel Samuel Tuke, over promotion.

In November 1645 Porter obtained a pass from Sir Thomas Fairfax, abandoned the king's cause, and went to London. He made his peace with the parliamentary cause: the House of Commons remitted the fine of £1,000 which the committee for compounding had imposed upon him, and passed an ordinance for his pardon.

Porter was quarrelsome, and in 1646 and 1654 intended duels were prevented by official intervention. In 1659 he was engaged in the plots for the restoration of Charles II, but was not trusted by the royalists. After the king's return, he obtained the office of gentleman of the privy chamber to Catharine of Braganza and from 1677 served as a Groom of the Bedchamber to the King until his own death in 1683.

== Family ==
Porter married Diana, daughter of George Goring, 1st Earl of Norwich, and widow of Thomas Covert of Slaugham, Sussex, by whom he had three sons and five daughters. His daughter Mary married Philip Smythe, 2nd Viscount Strangford.
