= Giacomo Alberelli =

Italian painter

Giacomo Alberelli or Albarelli was an Italian painter, active mainly in Venice in the years 1600–1650.

== Life ==
Alberelli was a pupil and assistant of Jacopo Palma the Younger with whom he worked for 34 years. He painted historical subjects, including the Baptism of Christ for the church of the Ognissanti in Venice. According to Ridolfi, he was also a sculptor.
