= Portrait of Endymion Porter =

Painting by William Dobson

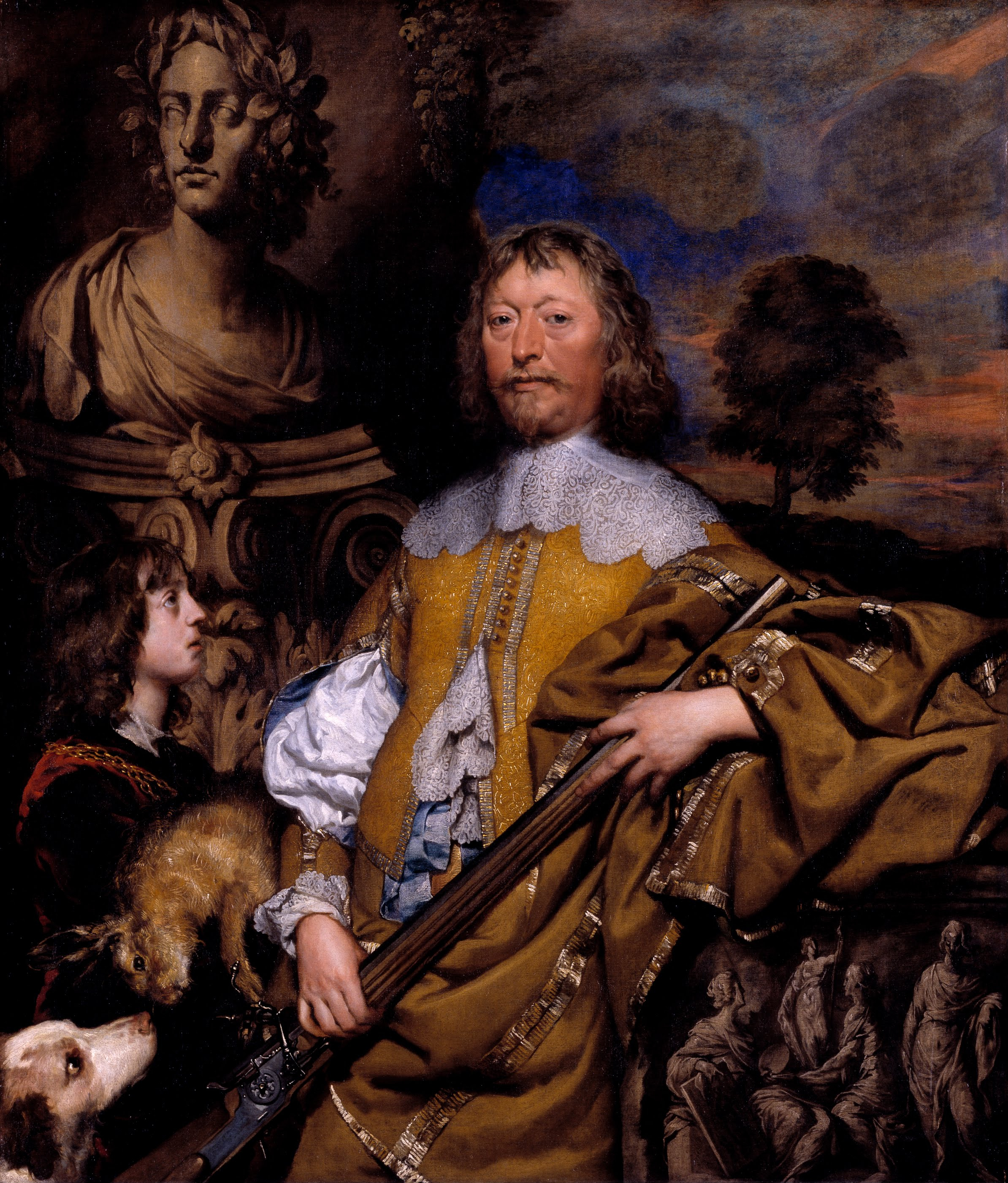
- Artist: William Dobson
- Year: 1642-45
- Type: Oil on canvas, portrait painting
- Dimensions: 149.9 cm × 127 cm (59.0 in × 50 in)
- Location: Tate Britain, London

Portrait of Endymion Porter is a c.1645 portrait painting by the Englsih artist William Dobson. It depicts the courtier Endymion Porter, a close associate of Charles I. He had risen at court through the influence of the Duke of Buckingham and had accompanied Charles to Madrid during the Spanish Match. He was also a noted patron of the arts. Dobson's portrait shows him as a huntsman holding a musket and accompanied by a gun dog and a page. Porter's pose references a portait of the Roman Emperor Vespasian by Titian, which was then in the Royal Collection.

The painting is believed to have been produced in Oxford which served as the Royalist capital during the English Civil War, where Dobson worked. However it has been argued that it may have been painted, or at least begun, earlier in 1642 in London before the outbreak of war. The painting was acquired in the Tate Gallery in 1888. In 1646 a print was produced based on the painting by the engraver William Faithorne.

== See also ==
- Self-portrait with Sir Endymion Porter, a 1635 painting by Anthony van Dyck

== Bibliography ==
- Huxley, Gervais. Endymion Porter: The Life of a Courtier, 1587-1649. Chatto & Windus, 1959.
- Myrone, Martin. Representing Britain, 1500-2000: 100 Works from Tate Collections. Tate Publishing, 2000.
- Vaughan, William. Endymion Porter & William Dobson. Tate Gallery, 1970.
