= Julius Porcellis =

Dutch painter

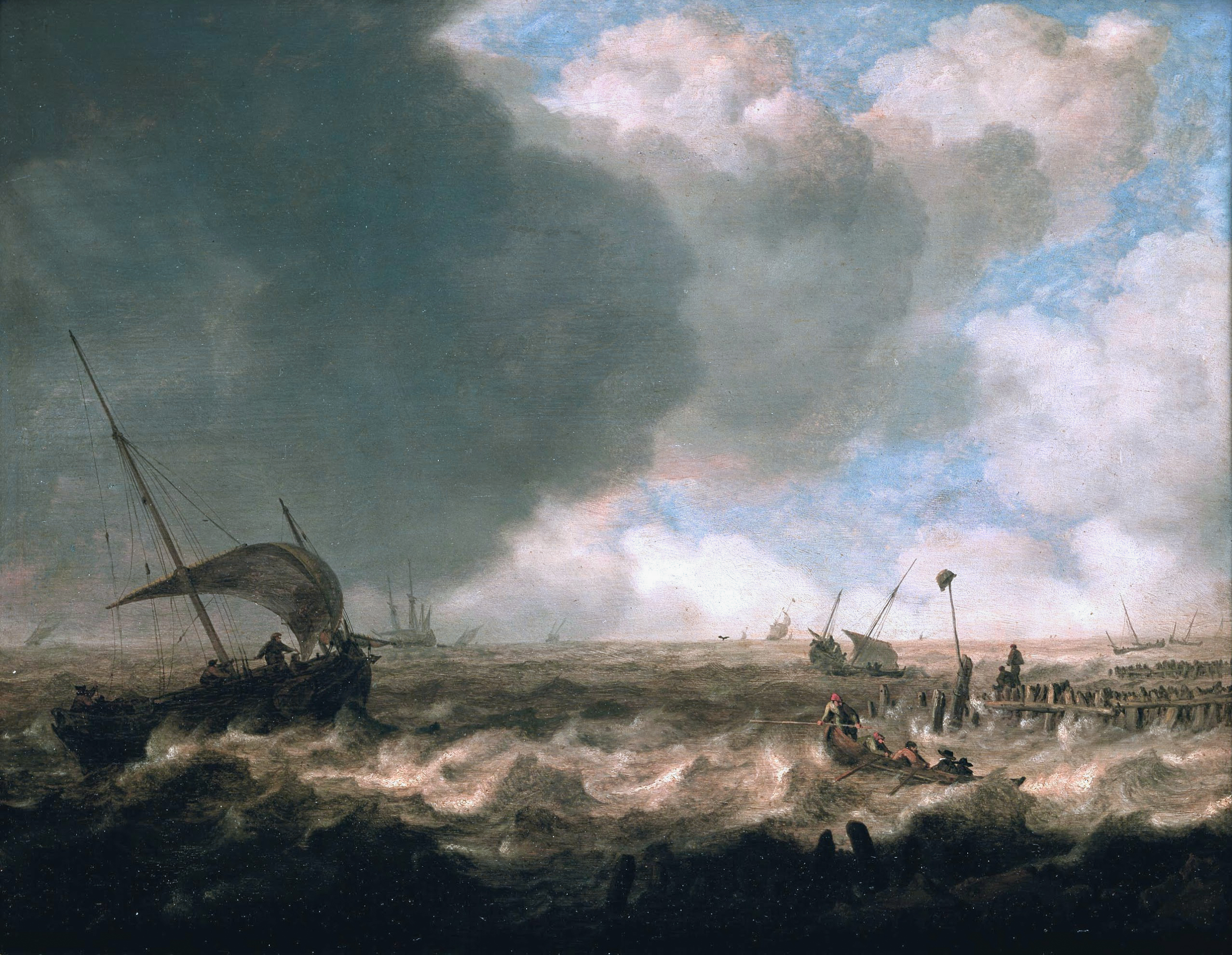
Julius Porcellis Marine

Julius Porcellis (1610 – buried 30 September 1645) was a Dutch marine artist.

Porcellis was born in Rotterdam, the son of the marine artist Jan Porcellis and Jacquemyntje Jansdr.

In 1622 he was recorded as being documented in Haarlem; in 1624 in Amsterdam; and in 1627 in Voorburg. He was also documented during that period, between 1624 and 1632, in Zoeterwoude village. Between 1634 and 1644 he was active in Rotterdam.

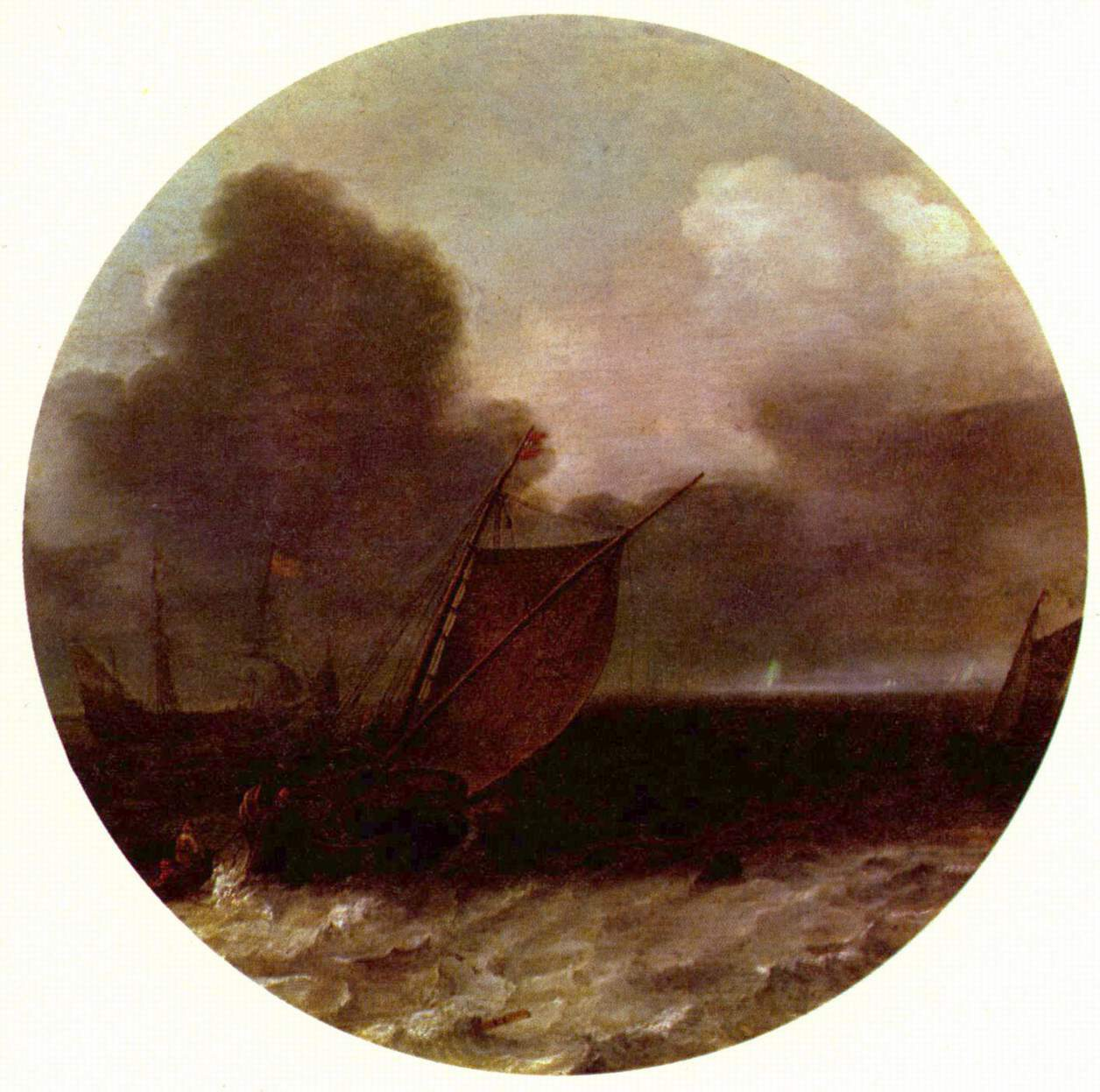
Julius Porcellis, Vessels in a Strong Wind, oil on panel, Ø 33.5 cm, 1610-1632. Museum Boijmans Van Beuningen, Rotterdam

He died in Leiden where he had lived in the Breestraat and was buried on September 30th 1645 in the St. Pancras church.
