= Carlo Girolamo Bersotti =

Italian painter

Carlo Girolamo Bersotti (1645–1700s) was an Italian painter, active during the Baroque period in Milan. Born in Pavia, he was a pupil of Carlo Sacchi (1617–1703), and painted mainly landscapes, still lifes, and animals. Also called Borsotti.
