= Prince Rupert, Colonel William Legge and Colonel John Russell =

Painting by William Dobson

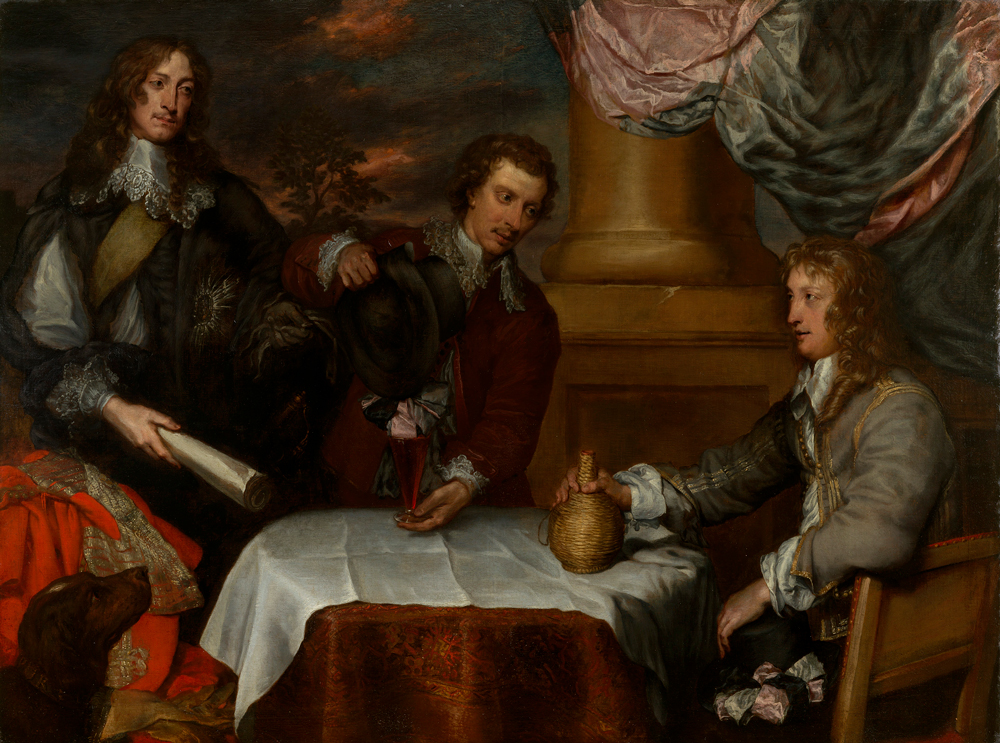
- Artist: William Dobson
- Year: c.1645
- Type: Oil on canvas, portrait painting
- Dimensions: 151.1 cm × 203.2 cm (59.5 in × 80.0 in)
- Location: Ashmolean Museum, Oxford

Prince Rupert, Colonel William Legge and Colonel John Russell is a c. 1645 oil painting by the English artist William Dobson. It is a triple portrait of three prominent figures of the Cavalier side during the English Civil War Prince Rupert of the Rhine and Colonels William Legge and John Russell. It depicts three figures whose loyalty to the Royalist cause had been questioned after the fall of Bristol leading them to be tried in Oxford. The painting is a statement of their continued loyalty to King Charles.

In 2017 the painting was acquired by the Ashmolean Museum in Oxford through the Acceptance in lieu scheme.

== Bibliography ==
- Bann, Stephen. Scenes and Traces of the English Civil War. Reaktion Books, 2020.
