= Carlo Sacchi =

Italian painter (1617–1706)

Carlo Sacchi (1617–1706) was an Italian painter of the Baroque period.

He was born in Pavia and trained with a painter, Carlo Antonio Rossi, in Milan, then travelled to Rome before settling in Venice. There he imitated a style recalling Paolo Veronese. He was also an engraver. Sacchi died in Pavia. One of his pupils was Carlo Girolamo Bersotti.
