= William Dobson =

English painter (1611–1646)

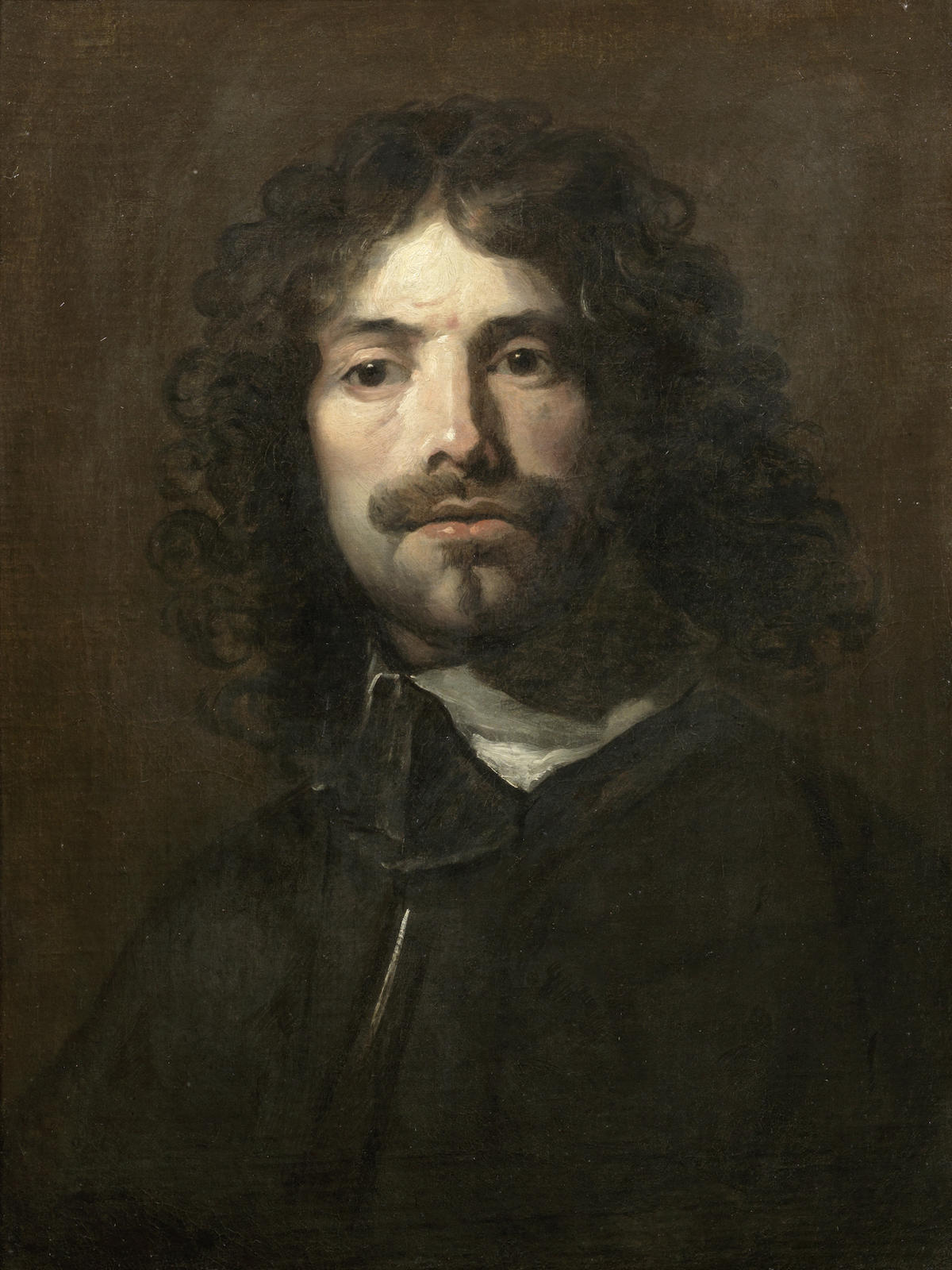
- Self-portrait, c. 1639
- Born: Baptised 4 March 1611; London, England
- Died: 28 October 1646 (aged 35); Oxford, England
- Education: Apprenticeship in London
- Known for: Portrait painting
- Spouses: Elizabeth (before 1634) Judith Sander (after 1637)

William Dobson (4 March 1611 (baptised); 28 October 1646 (buried)) was an English painter who specialised in portrait painting. One of the first significant English painters, he was praised by his contemporary John Aubrey as "the most excellent painter that England has yet bred". The art critic Waldemar Januszczak describes him as the first British born painter of genius.

After Dobson's first apprenticeship he joined the studio of the German-born artists Francis Cleyn. It is possible Dobson had access to the Royal Collection and copied works by Titian and Anthony van Dyck. Little is known of Dobson's career in the 1630s.

After van Dyck’s death in 1641, Dobson was able to gain royal commissions from Charles I of England. One unverified source claimed that he become serjeant painter to Charles, and Groom of the Chamber. It is not known how he gained an introduction to the king. Dobson's final years were disrupted by the English Civil War, which forced him to be based with the royal court at Oxford. There he painted leading cavaliers such as Charles Lucas, John Byron, 1st Baron Byron, Prince Rupert of the Rhine, and Maurice, Prince Palatine of the Rhine. Most of his surviving works are half-length portraits that date from 1642. There is evidence that his materials became increasingly scarce during the war. He returned to London in 1646, where he died in poverty at the age of 35.

There are examples of Dobson's paintings in art galleries in the UK, the US, and in New Zealand, as well as in several English country houses.

== Life ==
=== Family and early years ===
Dobson was born in London and was baptised at St Andrew's Holborn on 24 February 1611. The historian Katharine Gibson states that his father (died 1626), who was also called William Dobson, was probably the painter and stainer who was mentioned in Corporation of London records in 1622, and according to John Aubrey was a gentleman who was an assistant to the Lord Chancellor, Francis Bacon, and was involved in the building and decoration of Verulam House in St Albans. However, Rosalinda Jones thinks that the description of Dobson senior as a decorative artist may be a misreading of Aubrey's statement that he assisted Bacon with the design of Verulam House, but "he spending his estate upon women, necessity forced his son ... to be the most excellent painter that England hath yet bred". It is not known whether Dobson senior is the same person as a lawyer called William Dobson.

William Dobson junior was first apprenticed to the English printseller and painter William Peake, before becoming a student in the studio of the German-born painter and tapestry maker Francis Cleyn. Dobson is believed to have had access to the Royal Collection and to have copied works by Titian and Anthony van Dyck, the court painter of King Charles I of England. The colour and texture of Dobson's work was influenced by Venetian painting, but van Dyck's style had little apparent influence on Dobson. The story that van Dyck himself discovered Dobson when he noticed one of the young artist's pictures in a London shop window is not supported by any evidence, nor do we know how he gained his introduction to the King, who had Dobson paint himself, his sons and members of the court.

=== Artistic career ===
Little is known of Dobson's career in the 1630s, but when van Dyck died in 1641, the opportunity arose for him to gain royal commissions from King Charles. He is said to have become serjeant painter to the King and groom of the privy chamber. However, this claim comes from only one old and as yet unverified source. During the English Civil War Dobson was based at the Royalist centre of Oxford and painted many leading Cavaliers. His portrait of the future Charles II as Prince of Wales at the age of around twelve is a notable baroque composition, and perhaps his finest work. He also painted at least the head of Duke of York, as well as portraits of leading Royalists such as Charles Lucas and John Byron, 1st Baron Byron, Prince Rupert of the Rhine and Prince Maurice.

=== Personal life ===
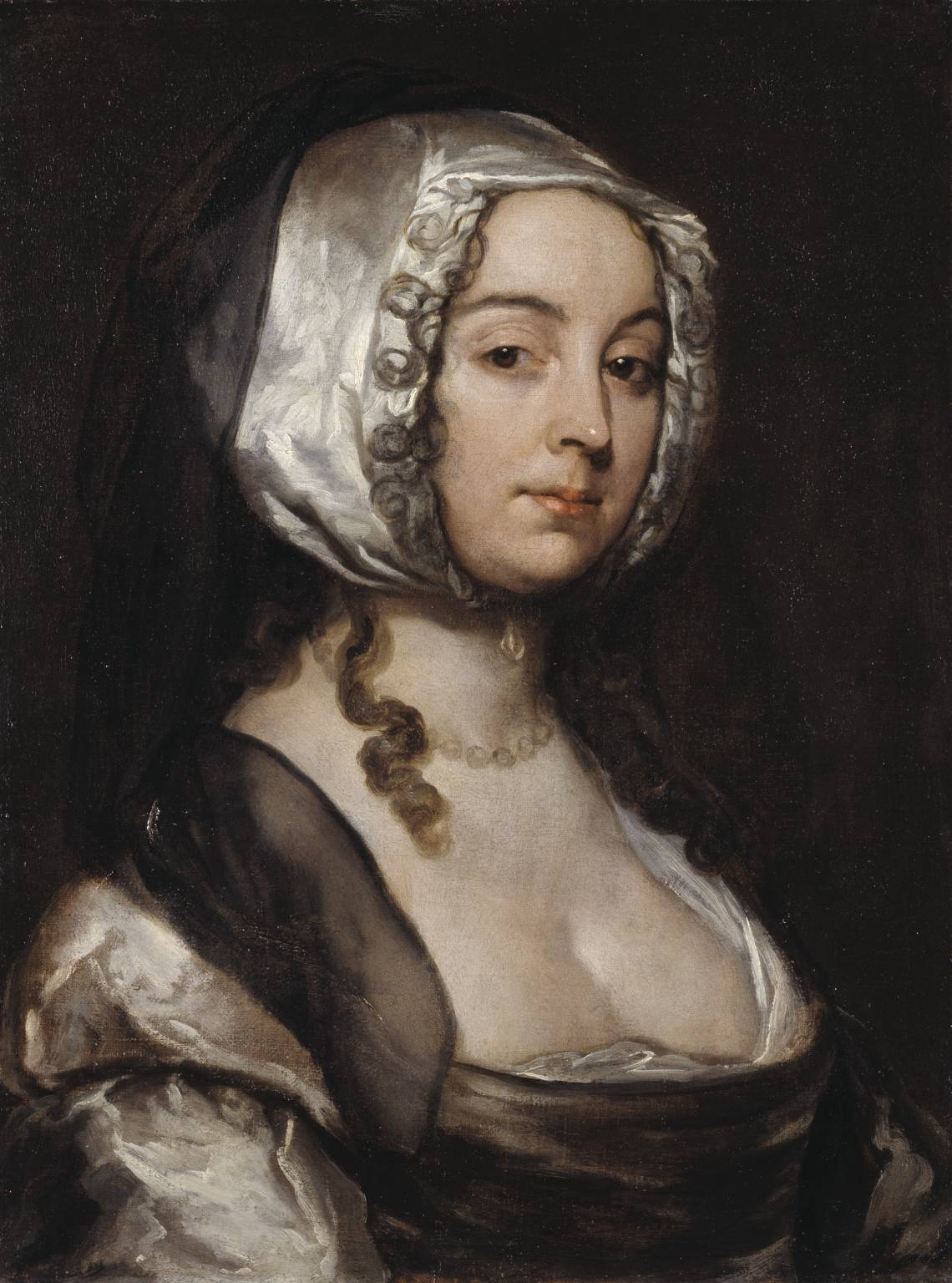
Portrait thought to be of the artist's second wife, Judith, c. 1635–1640

Dobson was married twice, first to Elizabeth, whose surname is unknown, as is the date of their marriage. She was buried in St Martin-in-the-Fields on 26 September 1634. On 18 December 1637 he married Judith Sander, who survived him.

=== Final years ===
In London, Dobson spent a period of time in prison for debt. Following his death he was buried at St Martin in the Fields on 28 October 1646.

== Works ==
Dobson is associated with 51 paintings, mostly half-length portraits dating from 1642 or later. The thick impasto of his early work gave way to a mere skim of paint, perhaps reflecting a wartime scarcity of materials. After Oxford fell to the Parliamentarians, in June 1646, Dobson returned to London. Now without patronage, he was briefly imprisoned for debt and died in poverty at the age of thirty-five.

Ellis Waterhouse described Dobson as "the most distinguished purely British painter before Hogarth", and in the view of Waldemar Januszczak he was "the first British born genius, the first truly dazzling English painter".

There are examples of Dobson's work at the National Gallery, the National Gallery of Scotland, Tate Britain, the National Portrait Gallery, the National Maritime Museum, Queen's House in Greenwich, the Walker Art Gallery in Liverpool, the Ferens Art Gallery in Hull, the Courtauld Institute of Art, the Dulwich Picture Gallery in London, in several English country houses including notably Alnwick Castle where Dobson's self-portrait with Nicholas Lanier and Charles Cotterell is displayed, at the Yale Center for British Art in New Haven, CT, USA, and at the Dunedin Public Art Gallery in New Zealand.

The 2011 anniversary of his birth was marked by exhibitions, a 'Dobson Trail' listing his paintings on a website, and a BBC television profile by Januszczak, The Lost Genius of British Art: William Dobson.

== Gallery ==
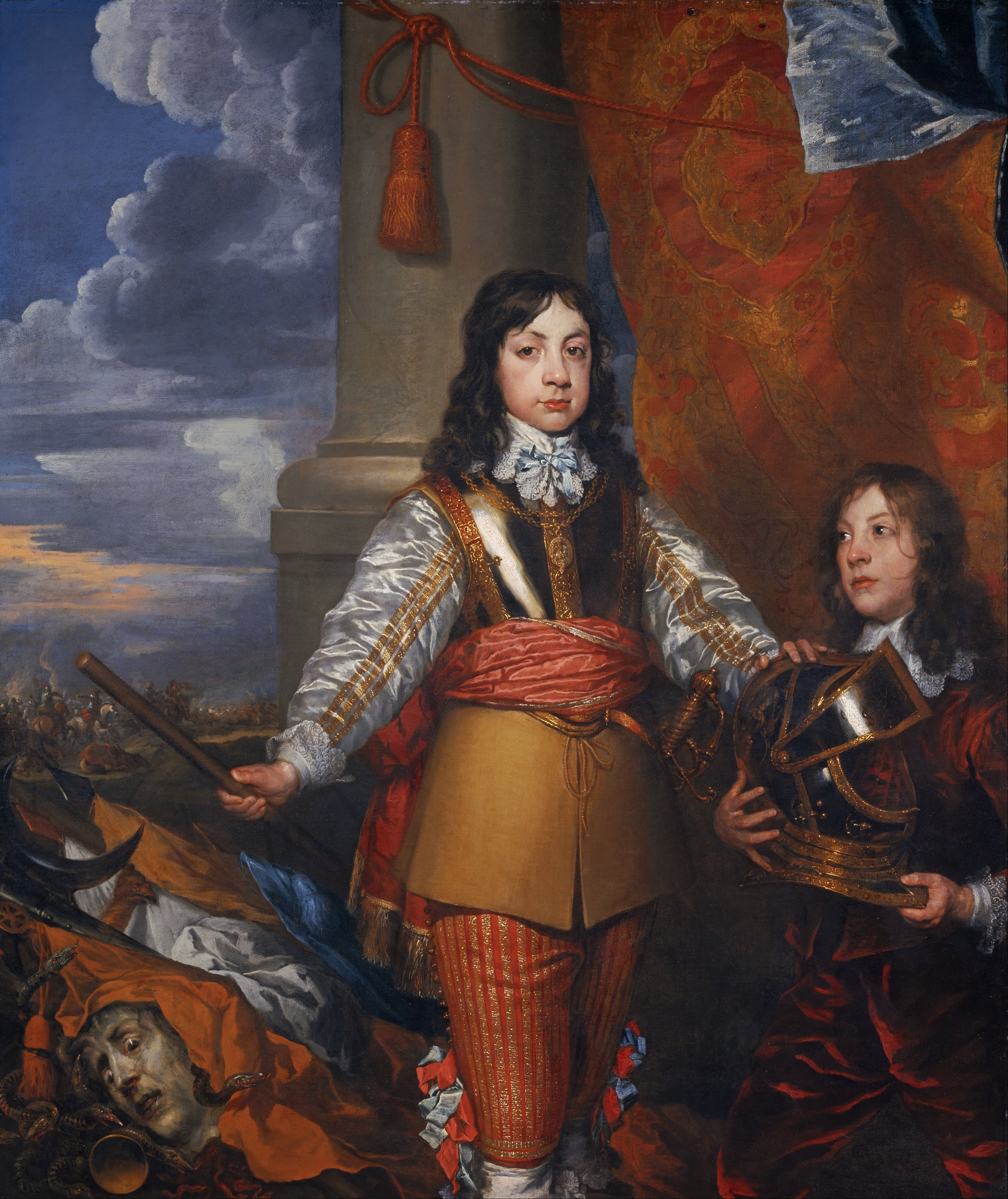
Charles II, 1630 – 1685. King of Scots 1649 – 1685. King of England and Ireland 1660 – 1685 (When Prince of Wales, with a page) (c. 1642), Scottish National Portrait Gallery

Portrait of Abraham van der Doort (late 1630s), Hermitage Museum, St Petersburg

Portrait of Lord Byron (1643), Tabley House

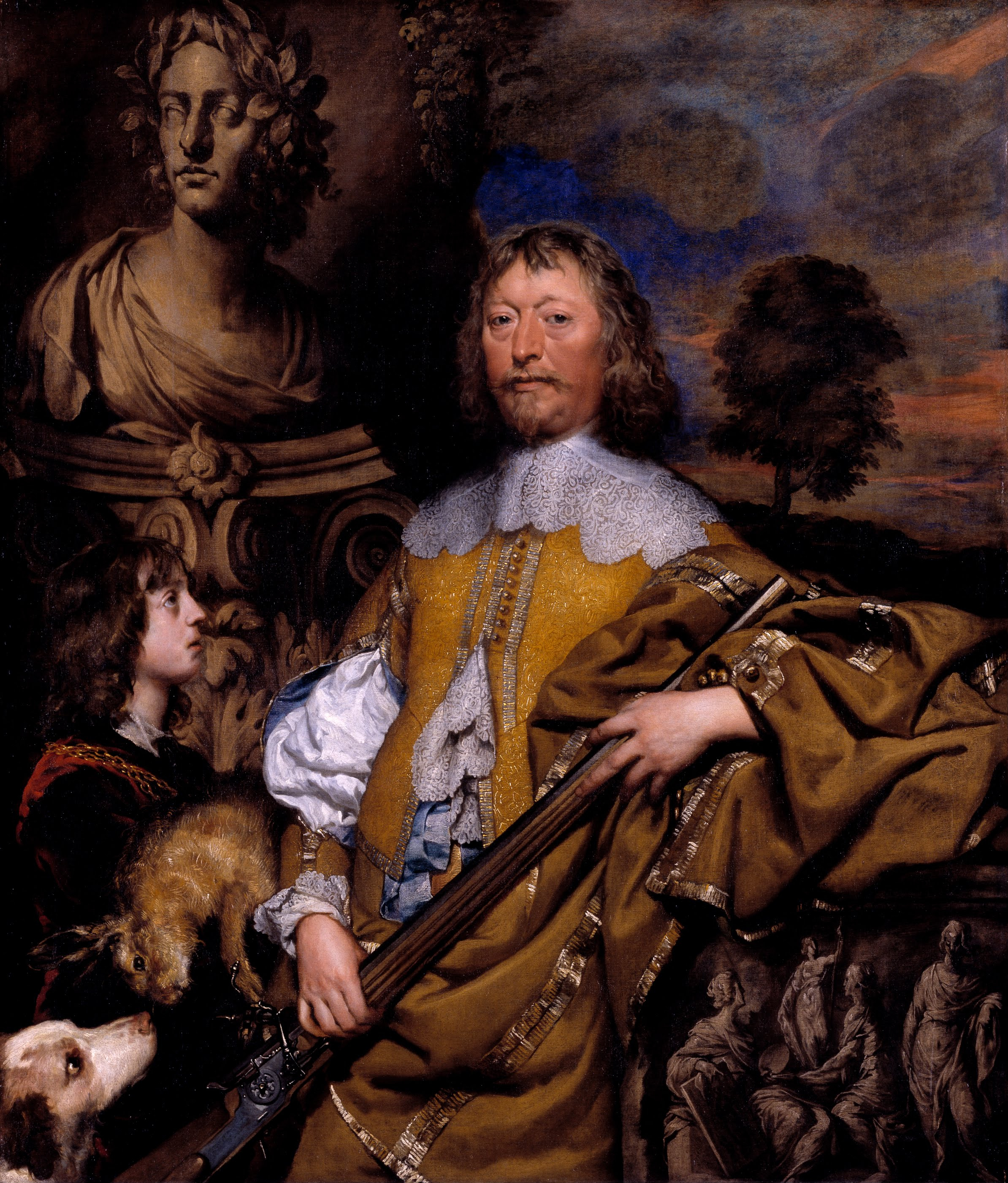
Portrait of Endymion Porter (1645), Tate Britain

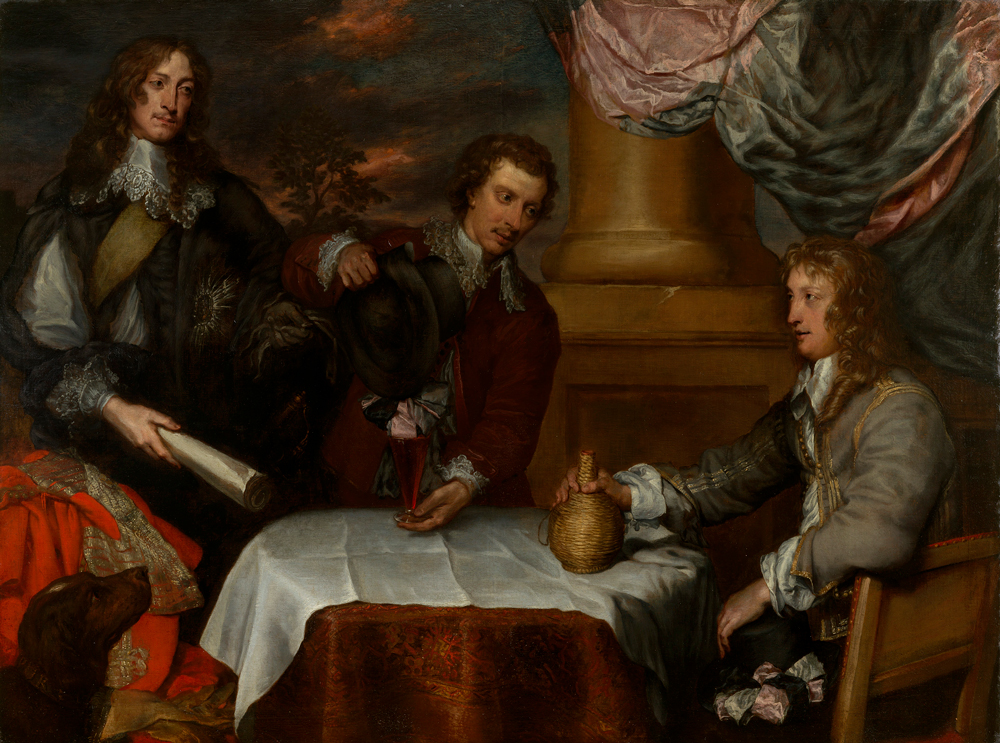
Prince Rupert, Colonel William Legge and Colonel John Russell (1645), Ashmolean Museum

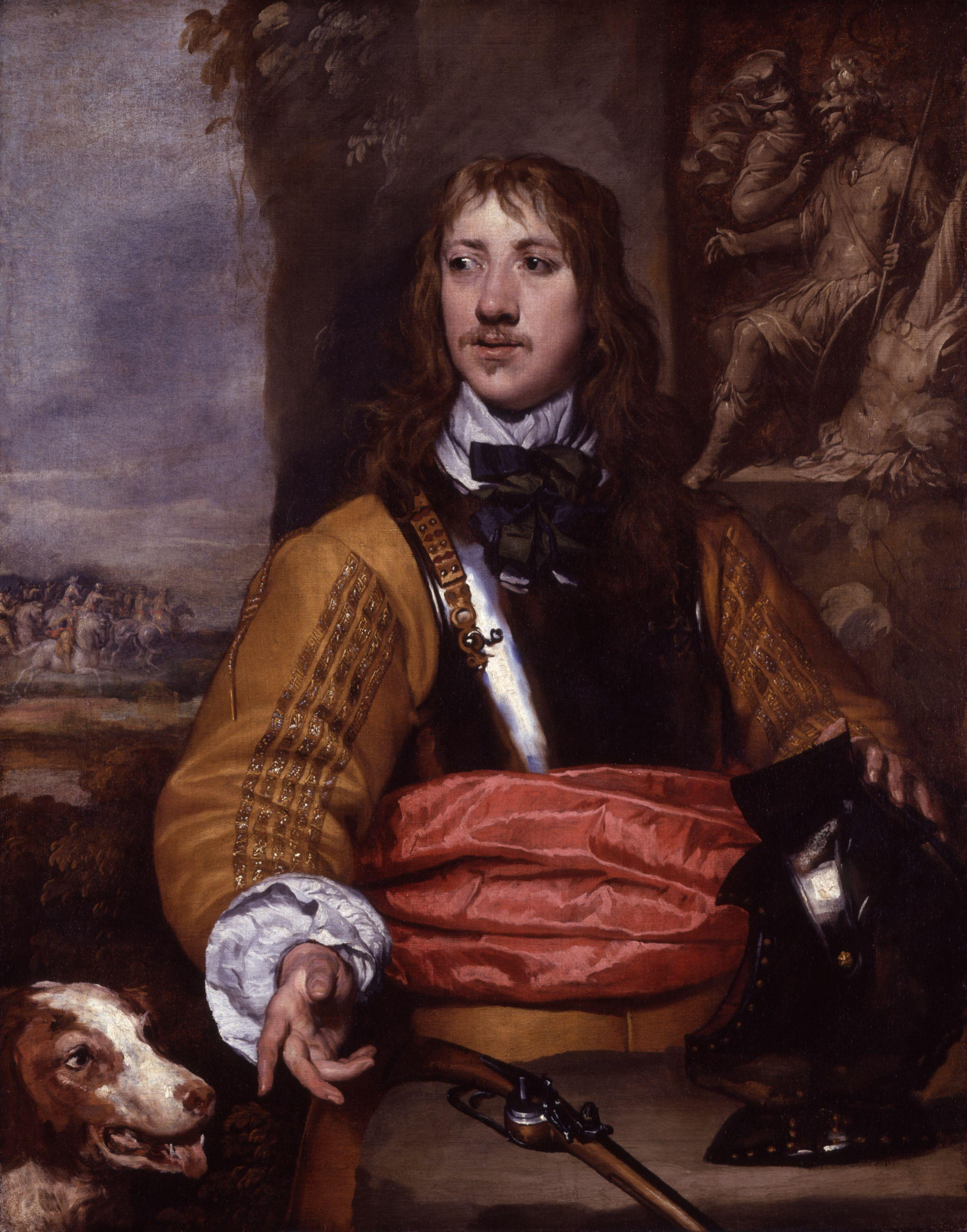
Richard Neville (undated), National Portrait Gallery

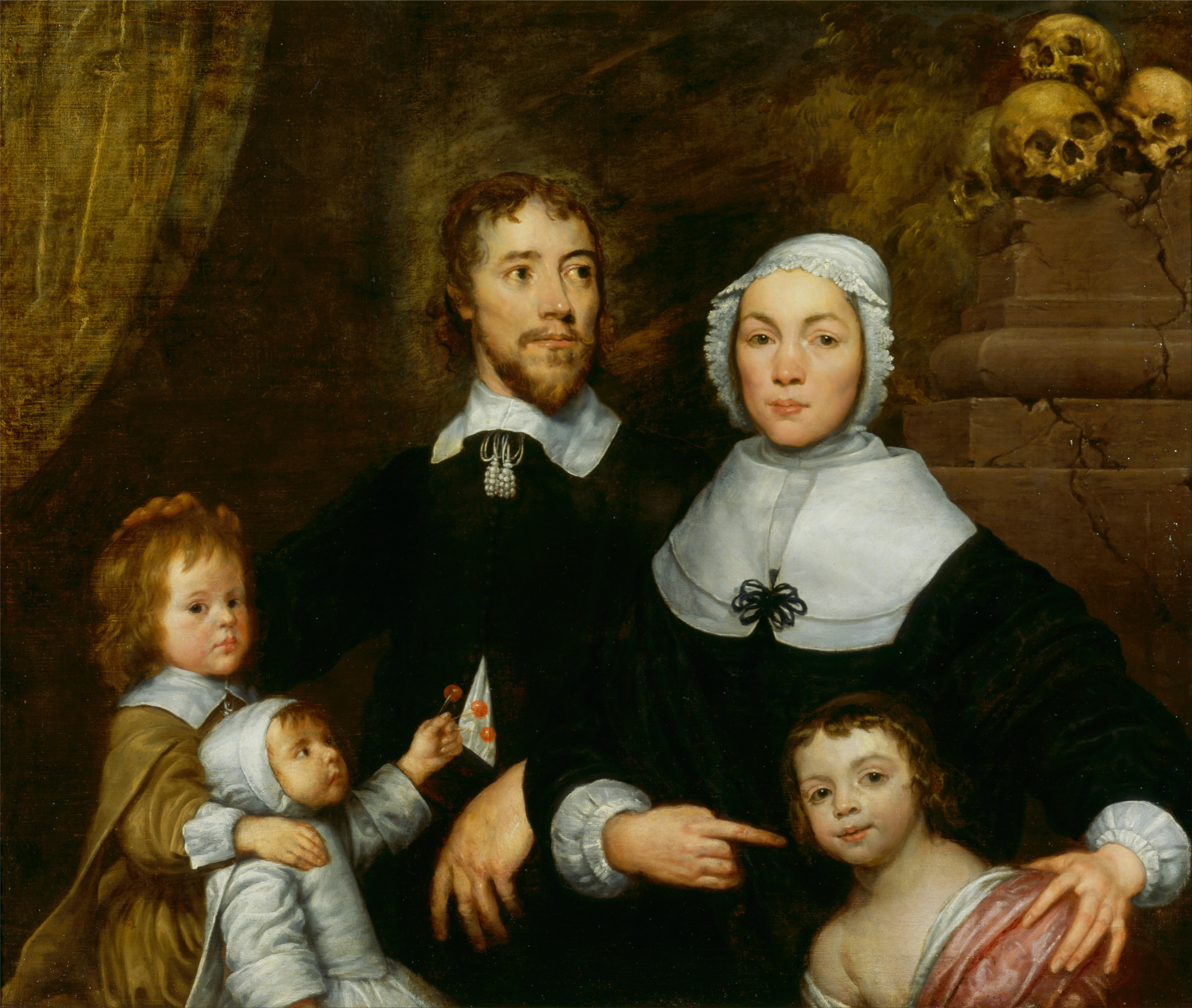
Portrait of a Family, Probably that of Richard Streatfeild (c. 1645), Yale Center for British Art

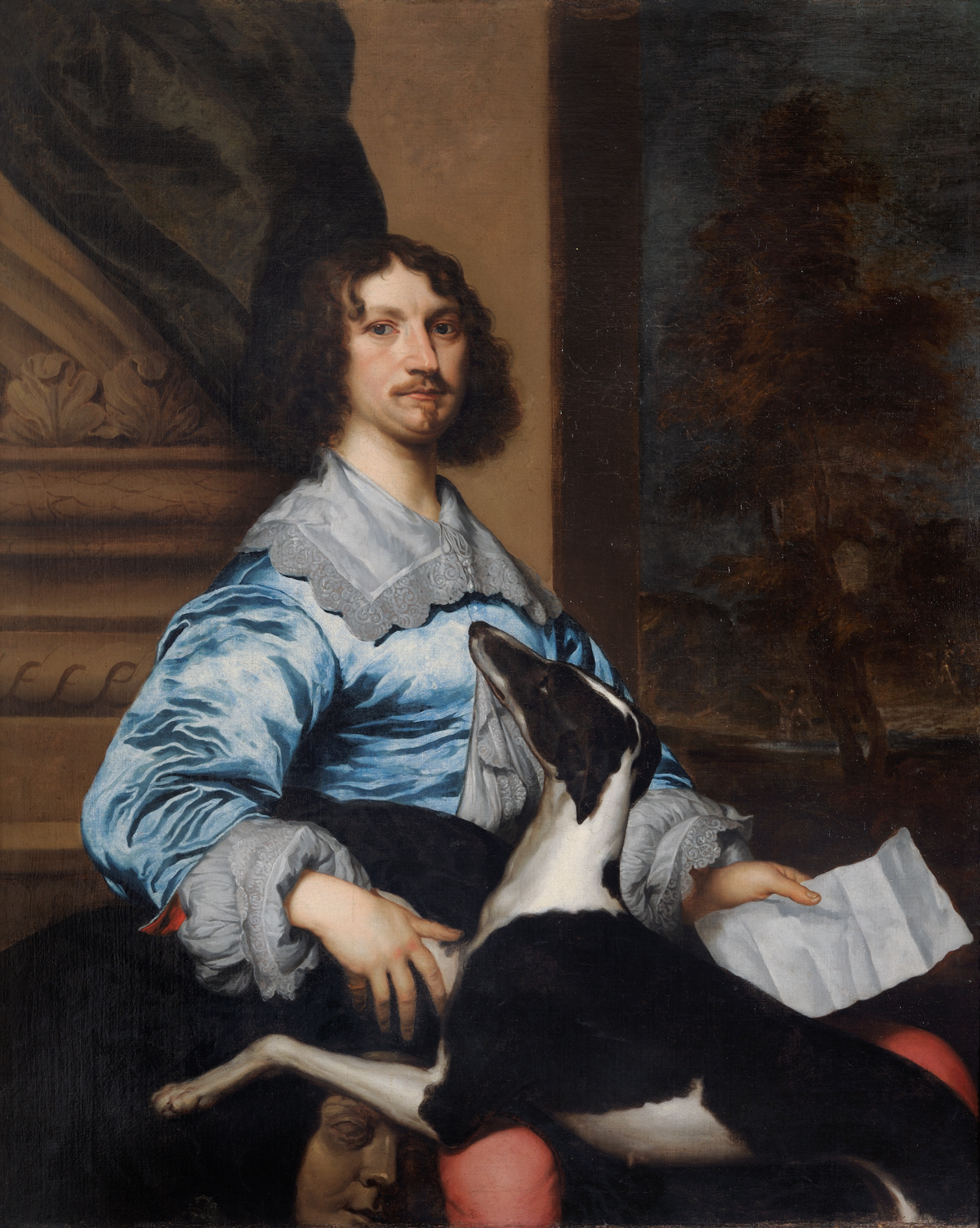
Portrait of diplomat and author Sir Richard Fanshawe (1644), Valence House Museum, Dagenham, UK

== Sources ==
- Jones, Rosalinda Faye (2016). William Dobson: The King's Painter. Tyger's Head Books. ISBN 978-1-909596-06-1.
