= Tabley Old Hall =

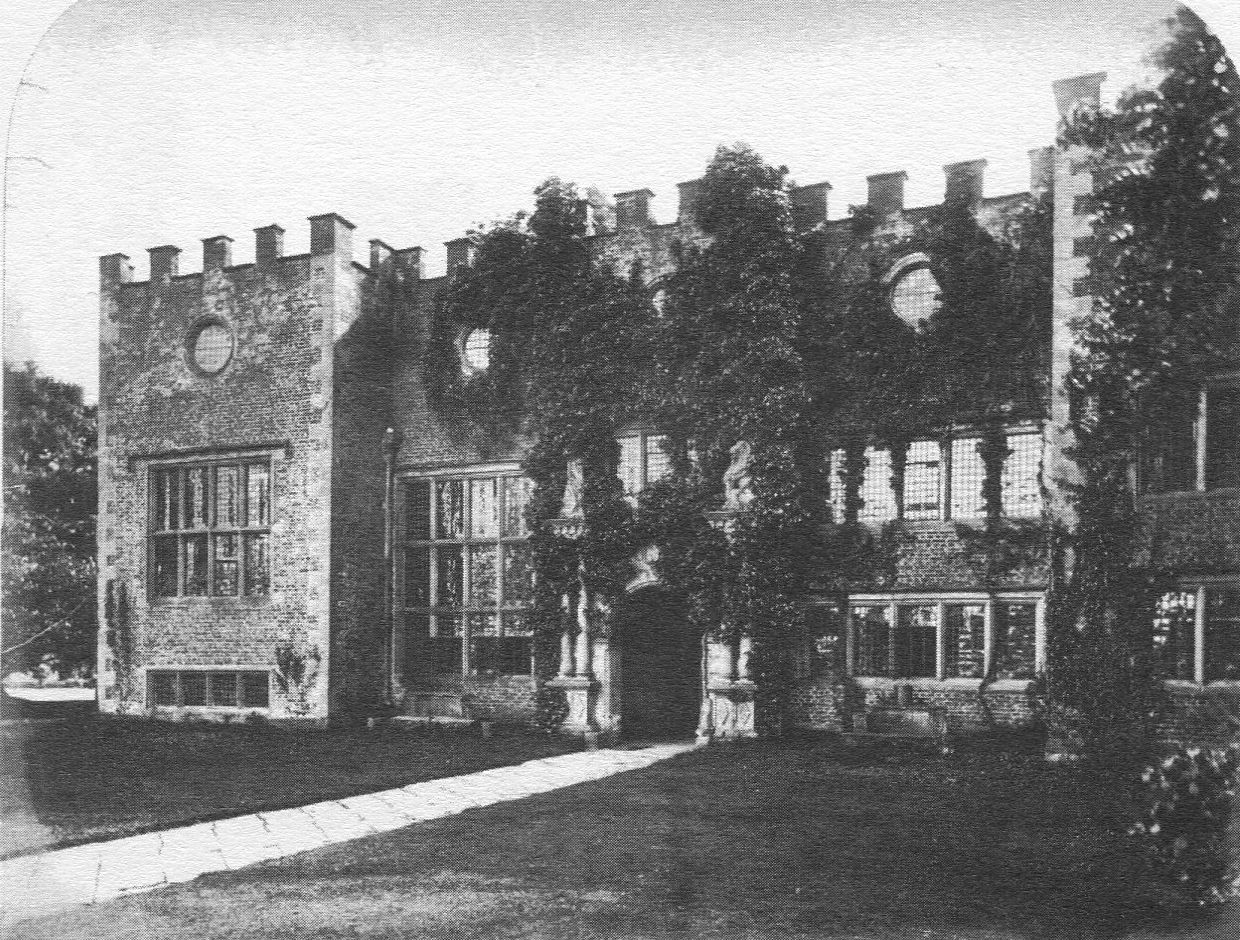
- Photograph of Tabley Old Hall in the 1860s

- Location in Cheshire
- 53.2926°N 2.4216°W
- Location: Tabley Inferior, Cheshire, England
- OS grid reference: SJ 720 774

Site notes
- Governing body: Crown Estate

Listed Building – Grade II*
- Designated: 3 September 1984
- Reference no.: 1139011

Scheduled monument
- Official name: Tabley Old Hall moated site and gatehouse.
- Designated: 24 September 1992
- Reference no.: 1012354

The ruin of Tabley Old Hall (more properly known as Nether Tabley Old Hall) is on an island surrounded by a moat in the civil parish of Tabley Inferior, about 1.5 miles (2.4 km) to the west of Knutsford, Cheshire, England. The ruin is recorded in the National Heritage List for England as a designated Grade II* listed building, and the moated site on which it stands is a scheduled monument.

== Older history ==
=== Before the new house ===
The hall is the ancestral home of the Leicester (or Leycester) family of Tabley. The estate of Nether Tabley was acquired in the 13th century by the marriage of Sir Nicholas de Leycester (who died in 1295) to Margaret de Dutton. The first house on the site was a timber-framed hall built by John Leycester, who died in 1398. This consisted of an open great hall, with a screens passage, and a two-storey domestic wing. During the 16th century Adam de Leycester made alterations to the house, and built a half-timbered gatehouse to the bridge crossing the moat. His descendant Peter Leicester (1588–1647) married in 1611 and, to celebrate it, installed in the great hall a large and highly decorated carved chimney-piece, which was dated 1619. The carvings consists of heraldry, and of figures including terms, a merman, a mermaid, a naked child holding an hourglass, an owl, and a dove. Peter Leicester's son, the historian Sir Peter Leycester (1614–1678), altered and extended the house between 1656 and 1671. The main alterations were to the east front. This was extended forwards in brick, with projecting wings on each side, giving the house an E-shaped façade. It had a battlemented parapet below which were oculi. The latter gave the appearance of a two-storey façade, although the oculi looked only into the roof space. The house had a central entrance porch, with an archway flanked by Ionic columns decorated with lions sejant. The doorway from the porch leads into the former screens passage. The back of the hall was left untouched at this time. Alterations to the interior included re-panelling the great hall, adding an impressive staircase, and creating a study for Sir Peter's collection of over 1,300 books. Between 1674 and 1678 Sir Peter also built St Peter's Chapel alongside the hall. During the 18th century the house was extended further by Sir Francis Leicester, 3rd Baronet (1674–1742); this included increasing the servants' quarters. He also added another wing incorporating a new library (Sir Peter's old study was preserved), and a nursery. Stained glass portraits of English monarchs were inserted into the large window in the great hall.

Sir Francis had only one child, a daughter called Meriel (1705–1740). Her first marriage was to a member of the Legh family of Lyme Park, with whom she had one child, a daughter. In 1728 she married Sir John Byrne of Timogue, Ireland. After the death of Sir Francis, the Tabley estate was inherited by Meriel's oldest son by her second marriage, Sir Peter Byrne (1732–1770), who changed his surname to Leicester in order to inherit the estate under the terms of Sir Francis' will. Sir Peter wanted to demolish the old hall and build a new house, using the material from the old house for stables and outbuildings. However, he was prevented so doing by the terms of Sir Francis' will, which obliged his heirs to maintain the hall in good order; otherwise they would forfeit the inheritance. Sir Peter's response was to build a completely new house about 700 metres away, which is the present Tabley House. This house was designed by John Carr in Palladian style. The family moved into the new house in 1767.

=== After the new house ===
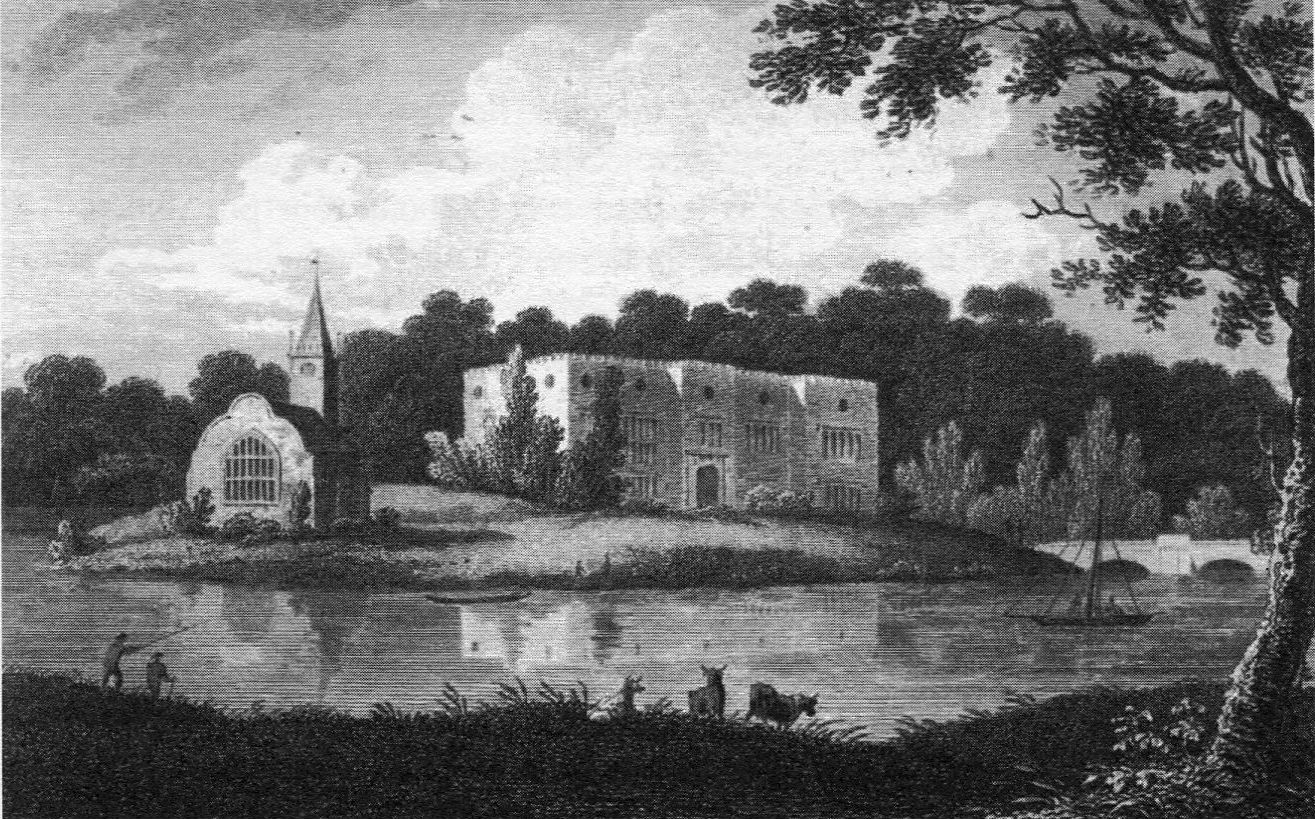
Engraving of the Old Hall and Chapel

The newer additions to the old hall were then removed, returning it to its 17th-century plan, and it was initially used as a farmhouse. In the 19th century, when under the care of George Warren, 2nd Baron de Tabley (1811–87), its structural condition was maintained, and it continued to be furnished with old furniture. Retired employees of the family lived in the house, and kept an eye on the family's children who used it as a playhouse. Following the weddings of two of Lord de Tabley's daughters in the 1860s, celebratory balls were held in the hall. When the Cheshire Yeomanry met on the estate, the officers dined in the new house, while the other ranks used the old hall. The old hall was also used to host tours demonstrating the history of the family. From the 1870s, Lord de Tabley kept his collection of historical objects and curiosities in the great hall, creating it into a museum. He also used the old hall as a lending library for local residents. His heir, John Warren, 3rd Baron de Tabley (1835–95), lived for most of the time in London rather than at Tabley, and visited only occasionally. His employees continued to live in the old hall, and he dined there each year at the time of the annual audit. He allowed the general public to walk through the grounds if they attended services at the chapel, and also gave permission for groups and organisations to use the hall for meetings and events. When Lord de Tabley's sister, Eleanor, Lady Leighton Warren (1841–1914), inherited the estate, she did not continue this custom. Wishing for more privacy, she closed the park to public access, and greatly reduced the number of visitors to the old hall.

After Lady Leighton Warren's death, her son Cuthbert (1877–1954) closed the old hall at the outbreak of the First World War. By this time the area around the hall had started to suffer from subsidence because of the extraction of brine from the Cheshire salt deposits. Nevertheless the hall reopened in 1916, apparently in a reasonable structural condition. By 1924 a buttress had been built to support one of the walls. In 1927 members of the Lancashire and Cheshire Antiquarian Society toured the building. The condition of the old hall then continued to deteriorate because of the subsidence. The chapel was also at risk, and it was taken down and rebuilt at the side of Tabley House, being re-consecrated on its new site in 1929. Attempts were made to sell the fabric of the old hall for rebuilding it on a different site, but these were unsuccessful. The family then decided to sell the contents of the hall, including items from Sir Peter's book collection. Other items were moved into the new house and its outbuildings, in particular into the room connecting the new house with the rebuilt chapel, which became known as the Old Hall Room. These items included the carved chimney-piece and the stained glass depictions of English monarchs.

== Later history and present day ==
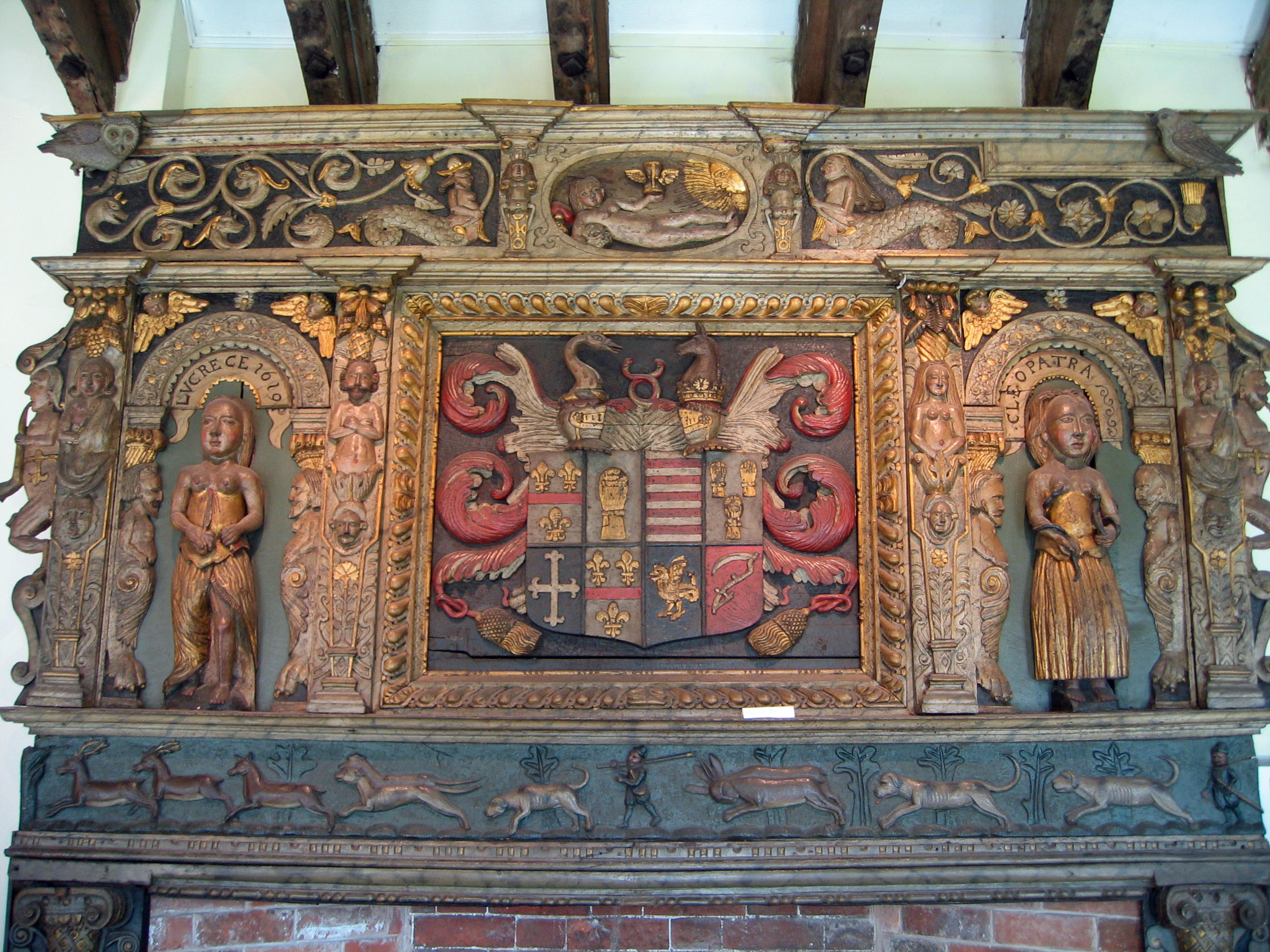
Chimney-piece in the Old Hall Room in 2010

The condition of the old hall fabric remaining after the Second World War continued to deteriorate. As of 2012 the building was described as leaning badly and being covered in ivy; "Sir Peter Leicester's new façade from 1671 just about survives". The last member of the family, Colonel John Leicester Warren, died in 1975. He bequeathed the estate to the National Trust and, failing that, to a charity to be chosen by his executors. The National Trust refused the bequest, and the estate was acquired by the University of Manchester. In 2007 the estate, other than Tabley House itself and its pleasure gardens, was bought by the Crown Estate; this included the site of the old hall and its remains.

The old hall was designated as a Grade II* listed building on 3 September 1984. The citation relating to this describes it as being the partial survival of the E-shaped front of a derelict house. In respect of the remains existing in the 21st century, the authors of the Cheshire volume of the Buildings of England series say "a few fragments of wall stand almost full height on the island, precariously propped up". The moated site on which the ruined building stands is a scheduled monument. The old hall is included in the Heritage at Risk Register of English Heritage, its condition being described as "very bad".

== Legends ==
According to legend, the bodies of a husband and wife were walled up inside the house. It is said that the man was killed in a duel, and the woman later committed suicide. Their ghosts were sometimes reported, leaning over a balustrade in the house.

== See also ==
- Grade II* listed buildings in Cheshire East
- List of Scheduled Monuments in Cheshire (1066–1539)
- Listed buildings in Tabley Inferior
