= Listed buildings in Tabley Inferior =

Tabley Inferior is a civil parish in Cheshire East, England. It contains 14 buildings that are recorded in the National Heritage List for England as designated listed buildings. Of these, two are listed at Grade I, the highest grade, one is listed at Grade II*, the middle grade, and the others are at Grade II. Much of the parish is occupied by the estate of Tabley House, and 13 of the listed buildings are associated with it, the other listed building being a timber-framed house.

== Key ==
Grade	Criteria
I	Buildings of exceptional interest, sometimes considered to be internationally important
II*	Particularly important buildings of more than special interest
II	Buildings of national importance and special interest

== Buildings ==
Name and location	Photograph	Date	Notes	Grade
Farm building, Moat Farm; 53.29260°N 2.42160°W	—	Mid 16th century	The timber-framed farm building was encased in brick in the late 18th century, and has a slate roof. It is in two storeys, and contains doorways, windows and pitch holes. Inside are two pairs of full crucks.	II
Tabley Old Hall; 53.29260°N 2.42160°W		c. 1650	This originated as a timber-framed country house in the 14th century. Damaged by subsidence, it is now derelict, and what survives is part of an E-shaped front of the house built in about 1650. It is in brick with stone dressings, and contains part of a stone porch with Ionic columns and a dentil cornice. The windows are mullioned. The ruins and the moated site on which they stand are a scheduled monument.	II*
St Peter's Church; 53.29613°N 2.41421°W		1675–78	A private chapel that was originally adjacent to Tabley Old Hall, but moved to its present site in 1927. The tower had been added in 1724. The chapel is built in brick with stone dressings and a stone-slate roof. It consists of a nave, an ante-chapel, and a west tower. The tower has a balustrade with ball finials at the top of the first stage, and another on the summit. Inside the chapel the stalls are arranged to face each other, and there is a gallery in the ante-chapel.	I
Parkside Cottage; 53.28330°N 2.40688°W		Late 17th to early 18th century	A timber-framed house on a stone plinth with whitewashed brick infill and a thatched roof. It is in two storeys, with a door at the far left, the original door having been blocked.	II
Dovecote, Tabley House; 53.29726°N 2.41397°W	—	c. 1760	The dovecote is in brick with a slate roof on which is a wooden lantern. It has an octagonal plan, and is in two storeys. There is a doorway with a fanlight in the south front. The windows in the ground floor are rectangular, and in the upper floor they are circular; most of them have been bricked up and rendered.	II
Stable block, Tabley House; 53.29675°N 2.41364°W	—	c. 1760	The stable block was remodelled in 1995–96 and converted into 21 dwellings. It was originally designed by John Carr, and is in brick with stone dressings and green slate roofs. The block forms a rectangular plan around a courtyard and has a south front of 23 bays. It is in two storeys and contains sash windows. The inward facing fronts have been altered for domestic use.	II
Tabley House; 53.29596°N 2.41311°W		1761–67	A country house designed by John Carr for Sir Peter Byrne Leicester. It is a symmetrical building in Palladian style, constructed in brick with stone dressings. The main part of the house is in three storeys with a basement, it has a front of nine bays with a large sandstone Doric portico. On the sides of the main house are two-storey three-bay symmetrical pavilion wings connected to the house by curved corridors.	I
White Lodge; 53.29019°N 2.42591°W	—	c. 1770	A lodge to Tabley House, it was probably designed by John Carr. It is built in whitewashed brick, and has a slate roof. In the centre is a two-storey semicircular archway. Flanking this on the ground floor are sash windows, and above are circular windows. There are outshuts on both sides.	II
Boat house 53.29144°N 2.41797°W	—	Late 18th century	The boat house is built in brick with stone dressings, but is without a roof. Facing Tabley Mere is a semicircular archway flanked by towers containing cross-shaped blind arrow slits. At the top is a ruined parapet. At the rear are arched doorways.	II
Folly tower 53.28673°N 2.41730°W		c. 1780	The folly tower stands on an island in Tabley Mere. It is circular, built in brick, and in three storeys. In the ground floor is a doorway with an arched entrance, in the middle storey are four arched windows, and in the top storey are eight oculi. The top is battlemented with machiolations.	II
Sundial, Tabley House; 53.29539°N 2.41278°W	—	Early 19th century	The sundial is in stone on brick footings, and stands on two circular steps. It consists of the upper part of a Greek Doric column, and has a copper dial and gnomon.	II
Parterre wall, Tabley House; 53.29533°N 2.41273°W	—	c. 1830	The wall around the parterre is in brick with a stone coping and is about 3 feet (0.9 m) high. Along it at intervals are stone piers carrying stone balls. Opposite the portico of the house is a bowed section.	II
Red Lodge; 53.29466°N 2.42278°W	—	Late 19th century	A lodge to Tabley House, it is partly in brick, and partly timber-framed, and has a tiled roof. Facing the drive is a porch, behind which is a single-storey range. To the right of the porch is a canted bay window. The gabled upper floor is jettied, the panels in the timber framing containing pargeting. The windows are mullioned.	II
Link building, Tabley House; 53.29604°N 2.41405°W	—	1927–29	The building links the house to St Peter's Church. It is in brick with stone dressings and has a stone-slate roof. The building is in a single storey, and has a west front of five bays. The windows are mullioned, and at the ends of the building are shaped gables with stone balls. It contains a large chimney-piece dated 1619 moved from Tabley Old Hall.	II

== See also ==
- Listed buildings in Plumley
- Listed buildings in Toft
- Listed buildings in Pickmere
- Listed buildings in Tabley Superior
