= St Peter's Church, Tabley =

Coordinates: 53.2961°N 2.4142°W

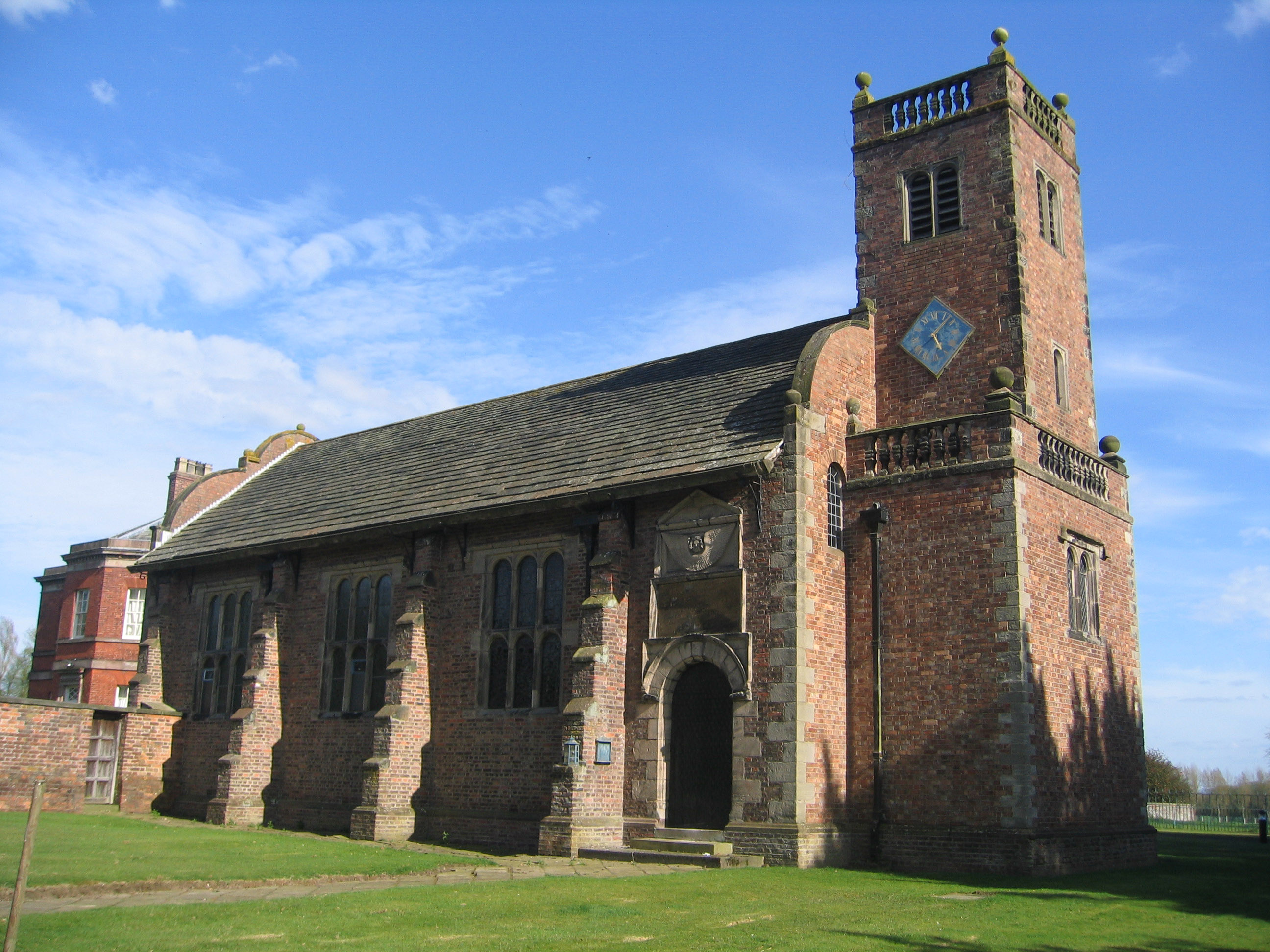
- St Peter's Church, Tabley, from the northwest

- Location in Cheshire
- OS grid reference: SJ 725 777
- Location: Tabley House near Knutsford, Cheshire
- Country: England
- Denomination: Anglican

History
- Status: Private chapel
- Dedication: St Peter
- Consecrated: 1929

Architecture
- Heritage designation: Grade I
- Designated: 5 March 1959
- Architectural type: Chapel
- Style: Gothic
- Groundbreaking: 1675
- Completed: 1929

Specifications
- Materials: Brick with stone dressings Stone slate roof

Administration
- Province: York
- Diocese: Chester

St Peter's Church is a chapel to the west of Tabley House near Knutsford, Cheshire, England. It is recorded in the National Heritage List for England as a designated Grade I listed building.

== History ==
The chapel was originally built on an island in the lower mere called The Moat in 1675–78 beside Tabley Old Hall by Sir Peter Leycester. The tower was added around 1720. In 1927 the chapel was moved to its present position because its foundations were being undermined by brine-pumping.

== Architecture ==
=== Structure ===
The chapel is joined to the house by a passage. It is built in brick with stone dressings and has a stone slate roof. The plan consists of a west tower and a three-bay nave with an ante-chapel over which is a gallery. The tower is in three stages. The lowest stage has a two-light window above which is a parapet with stone balusters and ball finials. The next stage is recessed and has a diagonal clock faces on three sides. The belfry stage above this has two-light louvred openings with stone surrounds. At the top is another parapet with stone balusters and ball finials.

=== Fittings and furniture ===
The ceiling is coved. The interior of the chapel is panelled and the stalls are arranged down the sides. The pulpit is octagonal and it has a sounding board and an ancient hourglass. The reredos was painted by Lady Leighton and carved by Countess Bathurst, one of her aunts. One of the windows contains Flemish 17th-century stained glass, and another window dated 1895 was designed by Edward Burne-Jones and made by Morris & Co. In the ante-chapel is a war memorial to the tenants who died in the First World War which is made from panelling from the Old Hall. The organ was made in 1876 by Bryceson Brothers and Morten of London. The registers date from 1678 and contain records of the baptisms and weddings of the Leicester family and their tenants.

== See also ==
- Grade I listed buildings in Cheshire East
- Grade I listed churches in Cheshire
- Listed buildings in Tabley Inferior
