= Tabley Mere =

Protected area in Cheshire, England

Coordinates: 53.287437°N 2.4169668°W

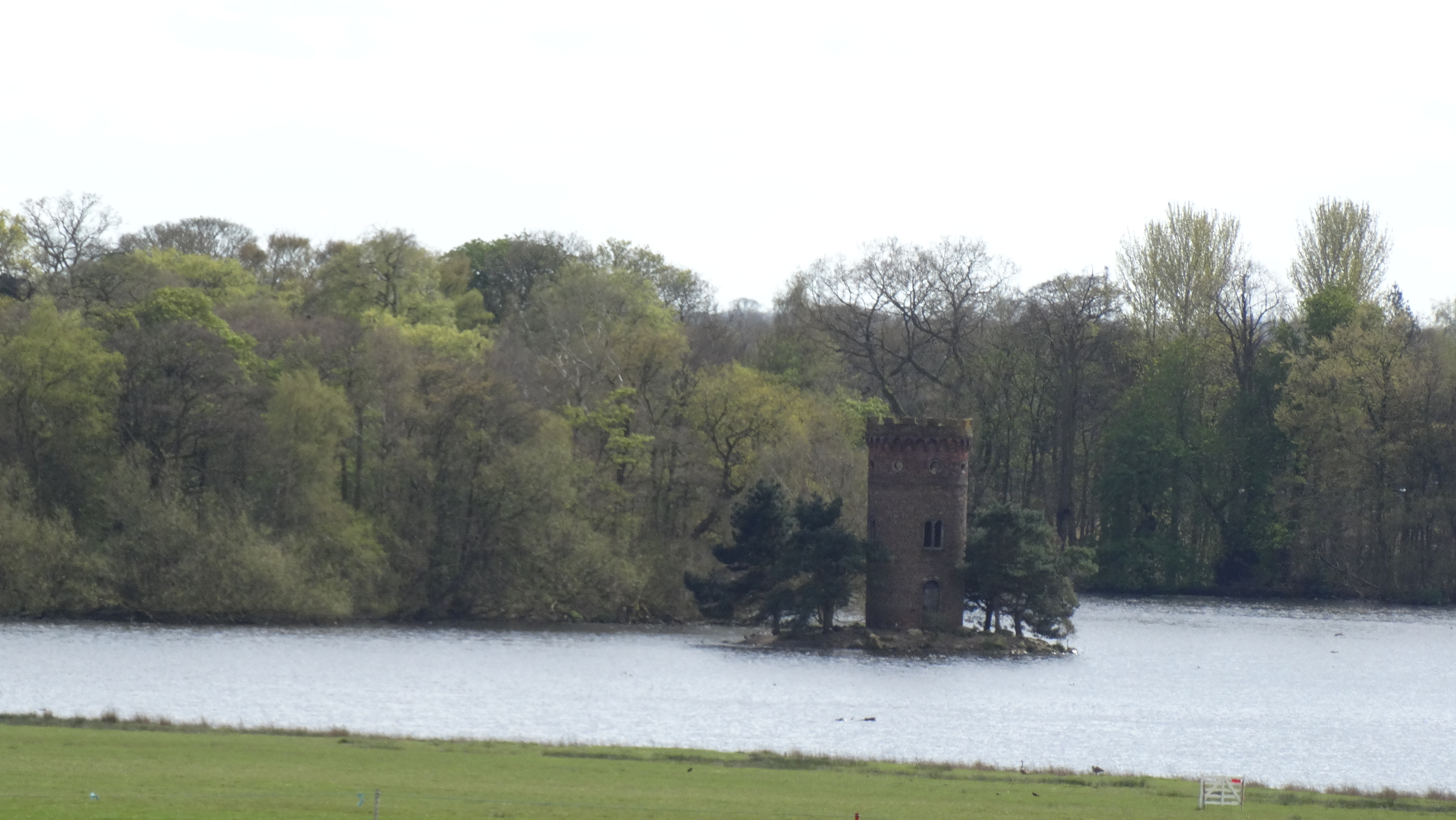
Tabley Mere

Tabley Mere is a Site of Special Scientific Interest (SSSI) in Cheshire, England. It is located 3 km southwest Knutsford and is situated within the estate of Tabley House (300m south of the house). This protected area has open pools of water (meres) that are very nutrient rich and this leads to an exceptional diversity of wetland plants.

The pools were enlarged at the time when Tabley House was built in the 1760s. These pools are mainly fed by surface water and the M6 motorway was constructed near one of their inflows.

== Biology ==
Wetland plants in the open pools (meres) include autumnal starwort, and pondweed species including Potamogeton berchtoldii, Potamogeton crispus and Potamogeton pectinatus. The pools are surrounded by fen habitat and acidic marshy grassland.

== Land ownership ==
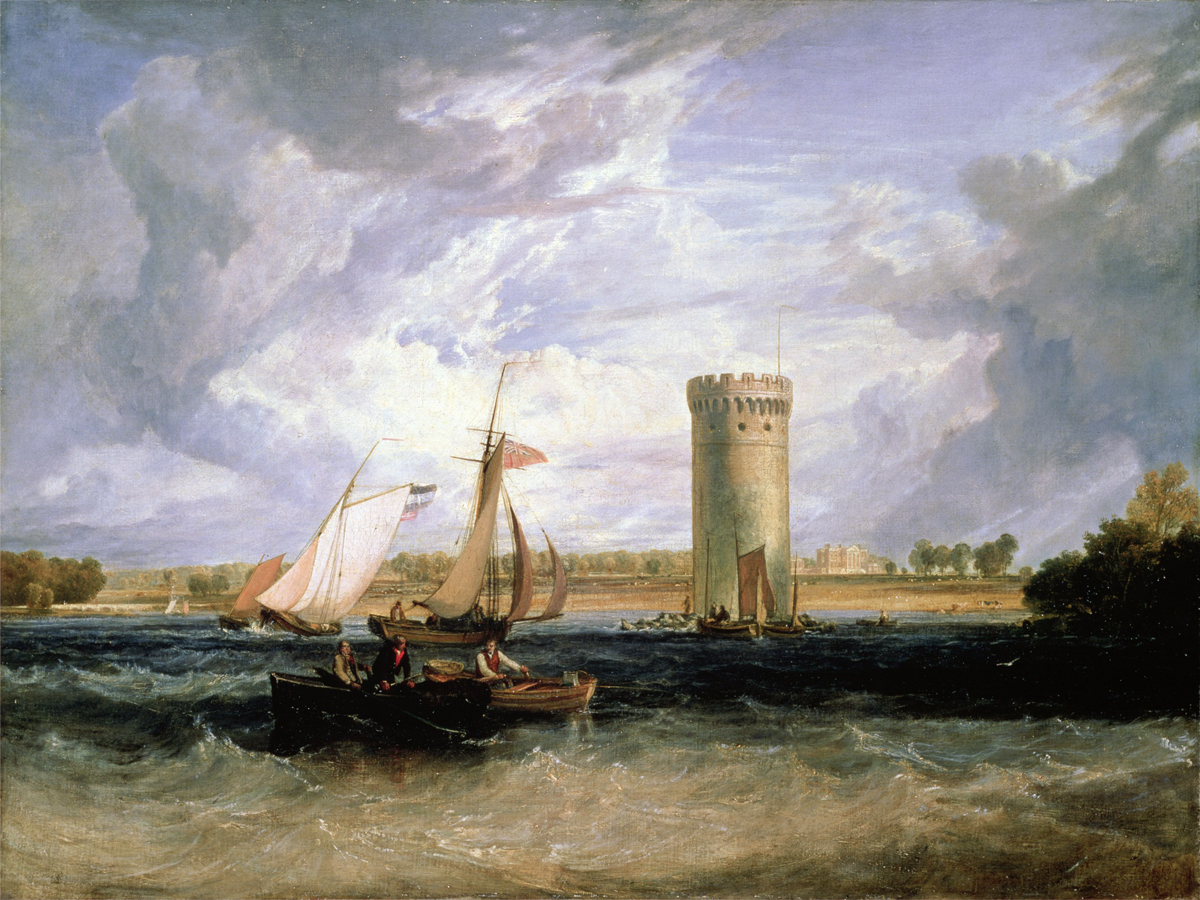
Tabley, Windy Day by J.M.W. Turner, 1808

All land within Tabley Mere SSSI is owned by the Crown Estate, who own the whole estate of Tabley House.
