= Tabley, Windy Day =

Painting by J.M.W. Turner

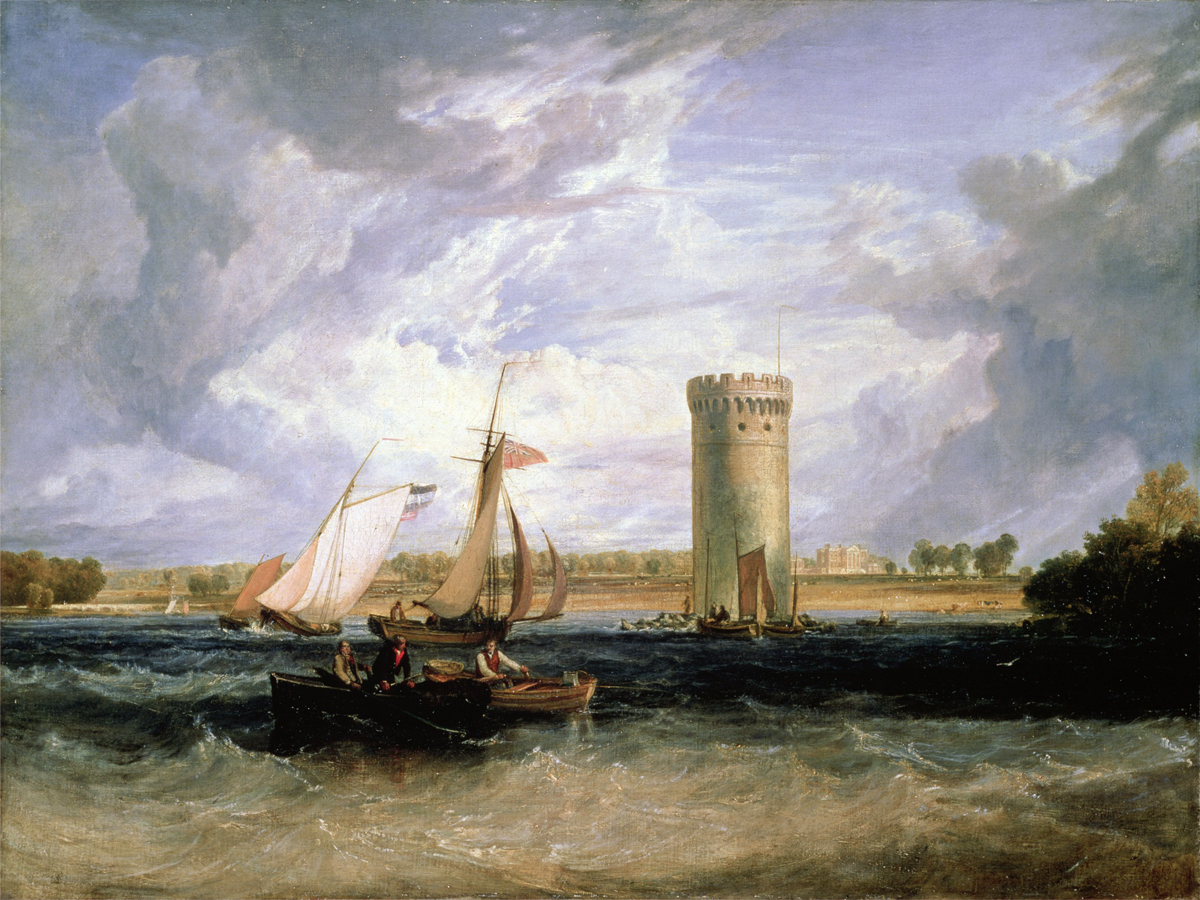
- Artist: Joseph Mallord William Turner
- Year: 1808
- Type: Oil on canvas, landscape painting
- Dimensions: 91.5 cm × 120.6 cm (36.0 in × 47.5 in)
- Location: Tabley House, Cheshire

Tabley, Cheshire, the Seat of Sir J. F. Leicester, Bt: Windy Day is an 1808 landscape painting by the British artist J.M.W. Turner. It features a view of Tabley Mere part of the Cheshire estate of the art collector Sir John Leicester who commissioned the picture. In the background is the Palladian Tabley House. Turner had a lengthy stay at Tabley as a guest of Leicester while working on the picture.

It was produced alongside companion piece Tabley, Calm Morning. While the latter was sold after Leicester's death in 1827 to rival art collector the Earl of Egremont and now hangs at Petworth House in Sussex, Windy Day remains in the collection of Tabley House.

== See also ==
- List of paintings by J. M. W. Turner

== Bibliography ==
- Bailey, Anthony. J.M.W. Turner: Standing in the Sun. Tate Enterprises, 2013.
- Boime, Albert. A Social History of Modern Art, Volume 2: Art in an Age of Bonapartism, 1800-1815. University of Chicago Press, 1993.
- Cannon-Brookes, Peter. Paintings from Tabley. Heim, 1989.
- Hamilton, James. Turner - A Life. Sceptre, 1998.
