= Portrait of Lord Byron (Dobson) =

Painting by William Dobson

- Artist: William Dobson
- Year: c.1643
- Type: Oil on canvas, portrait painting
- Dimensions: 142 cm × 120 cm (56 in × 47 in)
- Location: Tabley House, Cheshire

Portrait of Lord Byron is a c.1643 portrait painting by the English artist William Dobson. It depicts the aristocrat and soldier John Byron, 1st Baron Byron, a noted cavalry commander during the English Civil War. Byron was a staunch Cavalier who rallied to Charles I on the outbreak of war. He was created Baron Byron by the king for his victory at the Battle of Roundway Down. The following year he took part in the Storming of Bolton and the decisive Battle of Marston Moor in Yorkshire.

Dobson had settled in the Royalist capital of Oxford where he painted portraits of leading Cavaliers. For many years the picture was misattributed to Anthony van Dyck. The painting was displayed at the Art Treasures Exhibition in Manchester in 1857. Today the painting is part of the collection of Tabley House in Cheshire.

== Bibliography ==
- Cannon-Brookes, Peter. Paintings from Tabley. Heim, 1989.
- Morris, Edward. Public Art Collections in North-west England: A History and Guide. Liverpool University Press, 2001.
- Pergam, Elizabeth A. The Manchester Art Treasures Exhibition of 1857. Routledge, 2017.
