= Tabley House =

Country house in Tabley Inferior, Cheshire, England

Coordinates: 53.296°N 2.413°W

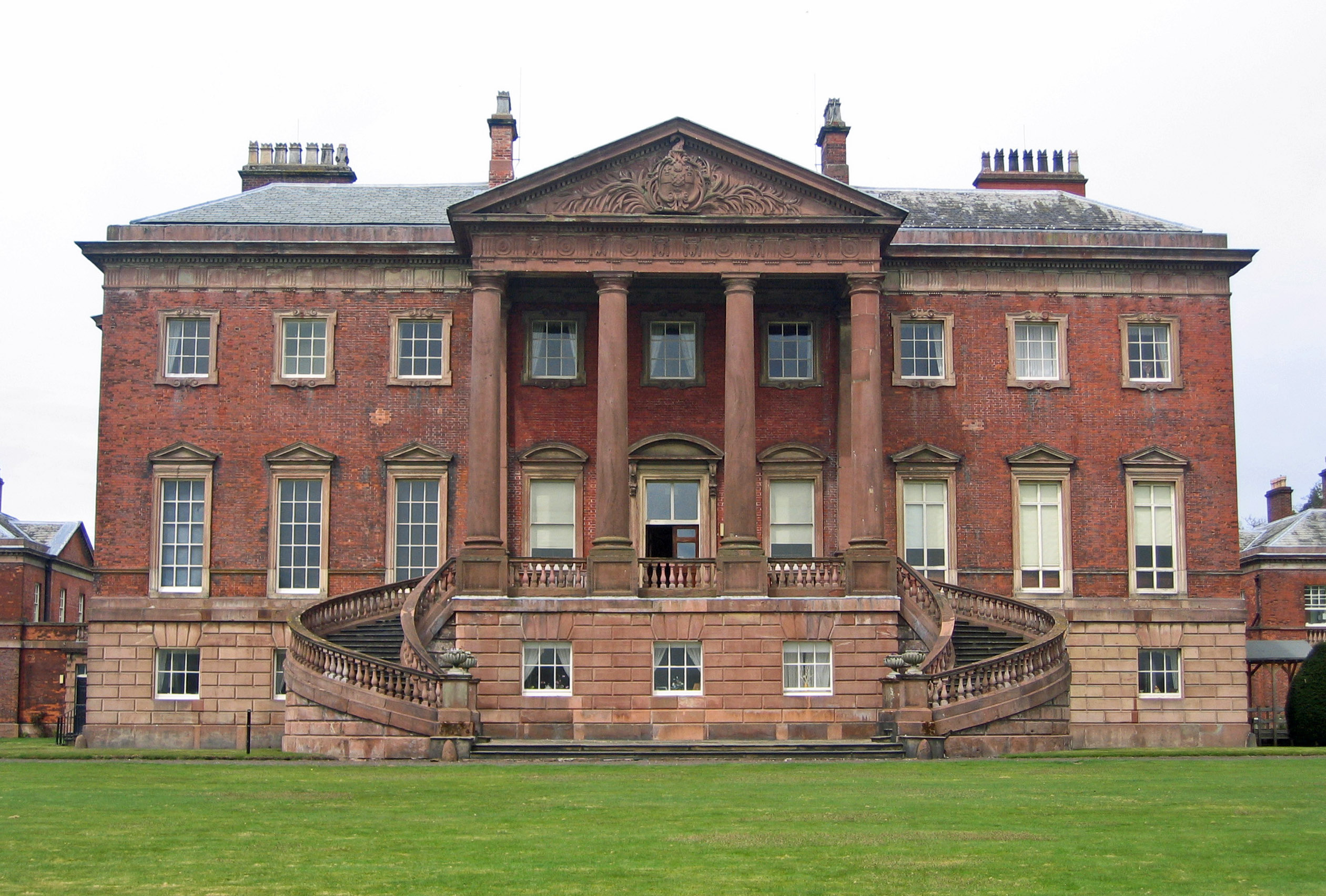
- South front elevation

- Location within Cheshire
- Type: Country house
- Location: Tabley Inferior, Cheshire, England

History
- Built: 1761–69

Site notes
- Architect: John Carr
- Architectural style: Palladian
- Owner: University of Manchester
- Website: www.tableyhouse.co.uk

Listed Building – Grade I
- Official name: Tabley House
- Designated: 5 March 1959
- Reference no.: 1115424

Tabley House is an English country house in Tabley Inferior (Nether Tabley), about 3 kilometres (1.9 mi) to the west of the town of Knutsford, Cheshire. The house is recorded in the National Heritage List for England as a designated Grade I listed building. It was built between 1761 and 1769 for Sir Peter Byrne Leicester, replacing the nearby Tabley Old Hall, and was designed by John Carr. The Tabley House Collection exists as an exhibition showcased by the University of Manchester.

In the early part of the 19th century, three of Carr's rooms on the west side of the house were converted to form a single room, the gallery. After Sir Peter's death, the house was re-orientated and the main entrance moved from the south to the north front. The house and estate continued to be held by the Leicester family until the death of Lt. Col. John Leicester Warren in 1975.

Under the terms of his will the house, contents and estate were offered to the National Trust, which declined the offer. The house was then acquired under the terms of the will by the Victoria University of Manchester, and the house was used as a school. Since 1988 its lease has been held by a healthcare company. The 3,600-acre (1,500 ha) estate surrounding the house was sold in 2007 to the Crown Estate.

The house is symmetrical and designed in Palladian style. It is constructed in brick with stone dressings, with a large sandstone portico on the south front. On the east and west sides of the main house are pavilion wings connected to the house by curved corridors. To the west of the house is St Peter's Church, also listed Grade I, which was moved from a position adjacent to Tabley Old Hall to its present site in 1927. In the grounds are other listed buildings, including the ruins of the Old Hall.

As of 2012 the ground and top floors of the main house, together with the adjacent wings, are used as accommodation for the elderly. The reception rooms of the first floor are open to the public at advertised times, and are entered by the original stairway on the south front; they contain paintings and furniture collected by the Leicester family. Some items in the collection had formerly been displayed on this floor, whilst others were moved from elsewhere in the house. The first floor may also be hired for weddings, meetings, and conferences. It is managed by a trust, which is supported by a group of Friends and by volunteers.

== History ==
=== Old Hall ===
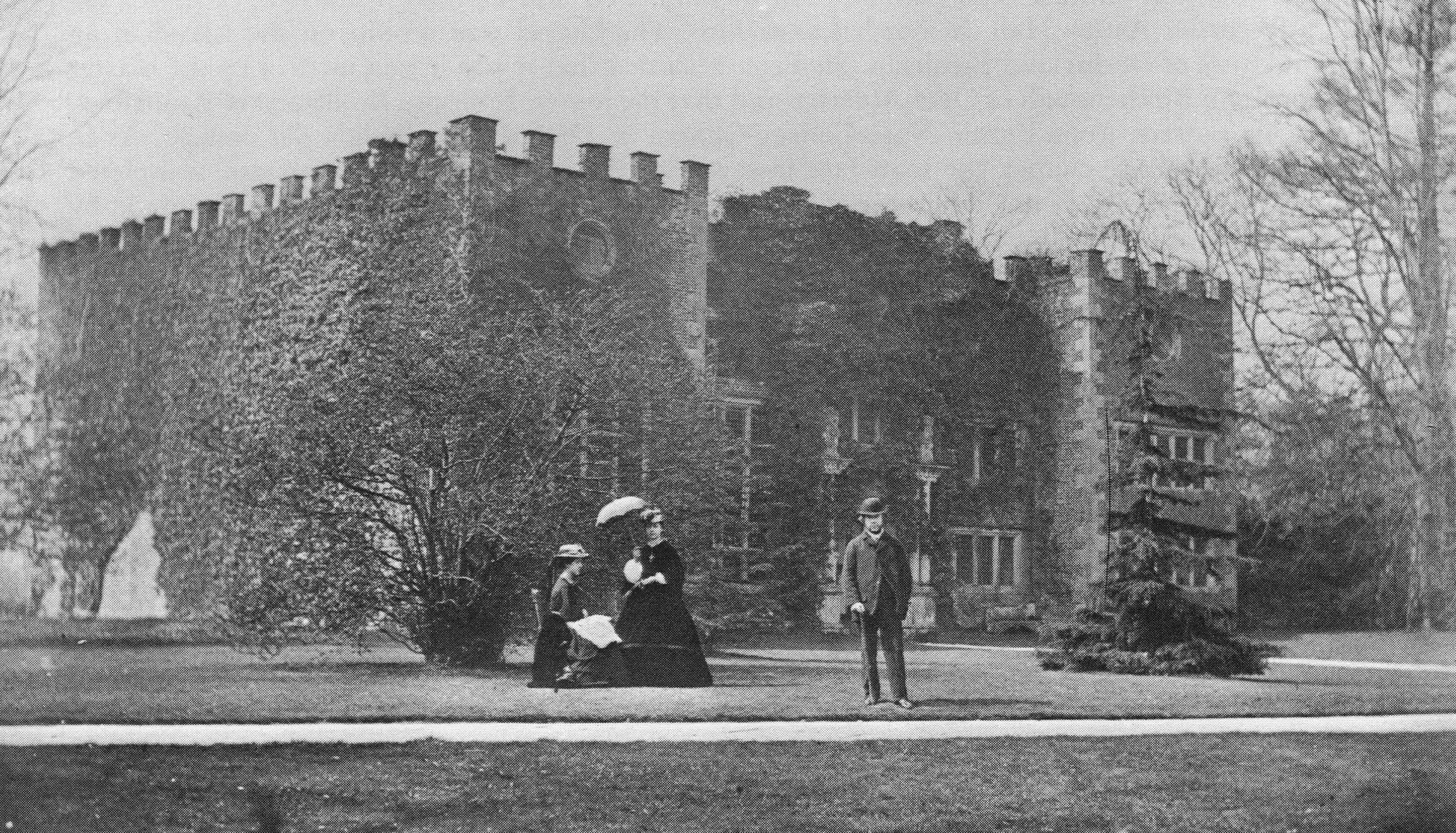
Tabley Old Hall about 1860, with Lord de Tabley and his sisters

The original house was built on an island in Nether Tabley Mere, known as the Moat, in about 1380 by John de Leycester. The house contained a Great Hall with a large central arch formed by two massive cruck beams, which were carved to imitate Gothic stonework. During the 16th century Adam de Leycester made alterations to the hall, and built a half-timbered gatehouse to the bridge crossing the mere. Peter Leycester (1588–1647) installed an ornate chimneypiece dated 1619 in the Great Hall.

In 1671 his son, the historian Sir Peter Leycester, 1st Baronet (1614–78), enlarged the house, adding a staircase and an upper storey. He arranged for the exterior to be encased in brick in Jacobean style, with a mixture of mullioned and round windows, and a porch with statues of lions. In 1674 Sir Peter replaced the chapel adjacent to the hall, designed in a mixture of Gothic and Jacobean styles, and a tower was added to the chapel in 1724.

After the new house was built in the 1760s, the Old Hall continued to be furnished, and the chapel was used for family worship. But in 1927 part of the hall collapsed because of subsidence resulting from the extraction of brine nearby. The building was abandoned, and is now a ruin. The chapel (now known as St Peter's Church) was demolished and rebuilt near to the west front of the new house. The ornate chimneypiece was moved and reinstalled in the Old Hall Room on the west side of the house.

=== Present house ===
The present house was built by Sir Peter Byrne Leicester. He inherited the estate through his mother's line on the death of his grandfather in 1742, at which time he was aged 10. At this time his name was Peter Byrne, and the name of Leicester was added by an Act of Parliament in 1744. One of the requirements of his inheritance was to keep the Old Hall in good condition, but Sir Peter considered it to be "old and not commodious". When he came of age in 1753 he decided to build a new house to replace the Old Hall. The provisions of his grandfather's will made it difficult for him to build a new house outside the parish of Nether Tabley, therefore Sir Peter decided to build it nearby in the estate, higher on the ground sloping down to the Moat. He appointed John Carr of York as architect; building began in 1761 and was completed in about 1769.

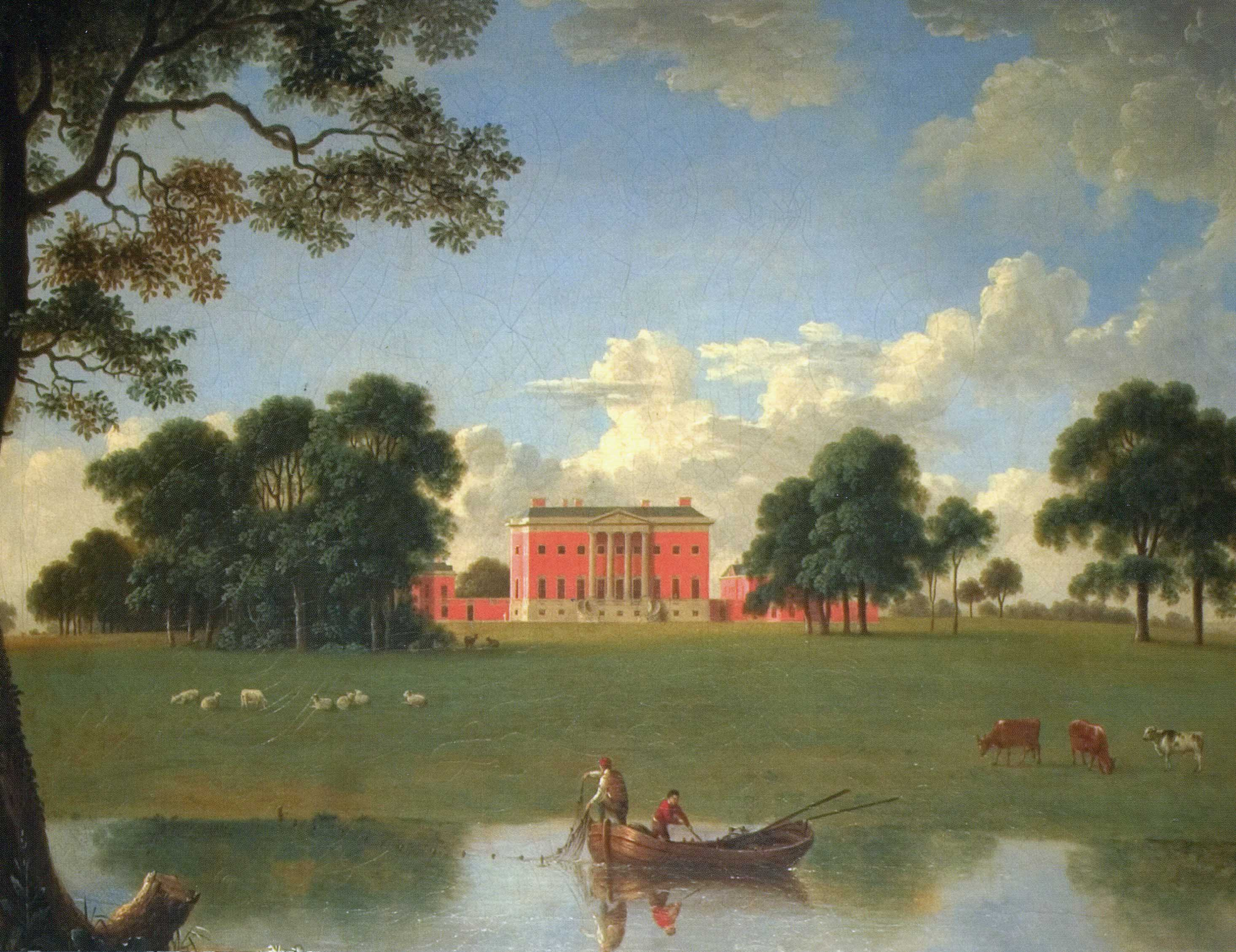
Tabley House from the Park by Anthony Devis c. 1770

Carr designed the house in Palladian style, even though by the 1760s this style was becoming less fashionable. His design consisted of a rectangular building in three storeys, with a projecting portico on the south front, and two pavilions on each side, which were set back and approached by curved corridors. On each side of the portico was a curved stairway leading to the main middle floor, the piano nobile. As the house was originally planned, it had a central staircase, with three rooms on the south front. The middle of these rooms was the entrance hall, to the west of it was the drawing room, and to the east was the dining room. Behind the drawing room was the library, and behind the dining room was a room known as the common parlour. Across the back of the house, on this floor, there were two bedrooms and three dressing rooms. The western pavilion contained the servants' bedrooms, and in the eastern pavilion was the kitchen. The interior of the house contained craftsmanship of a high quality. The plasterwork was created by Thomas Oliver of Warrington, the woodcarving of the doorcases and staircase was by Mathew Bertram, assisted by Daniel Shillito. Much of the furniture was made by Gillow of Lancaster. Sir Peter also commissioned a number of paintings, which included full-length portraits of himself and his wife by Francis Cotes, and landscapes of the grounds and the halls by J. M. W. Turner and Richard Wilson amongst others.

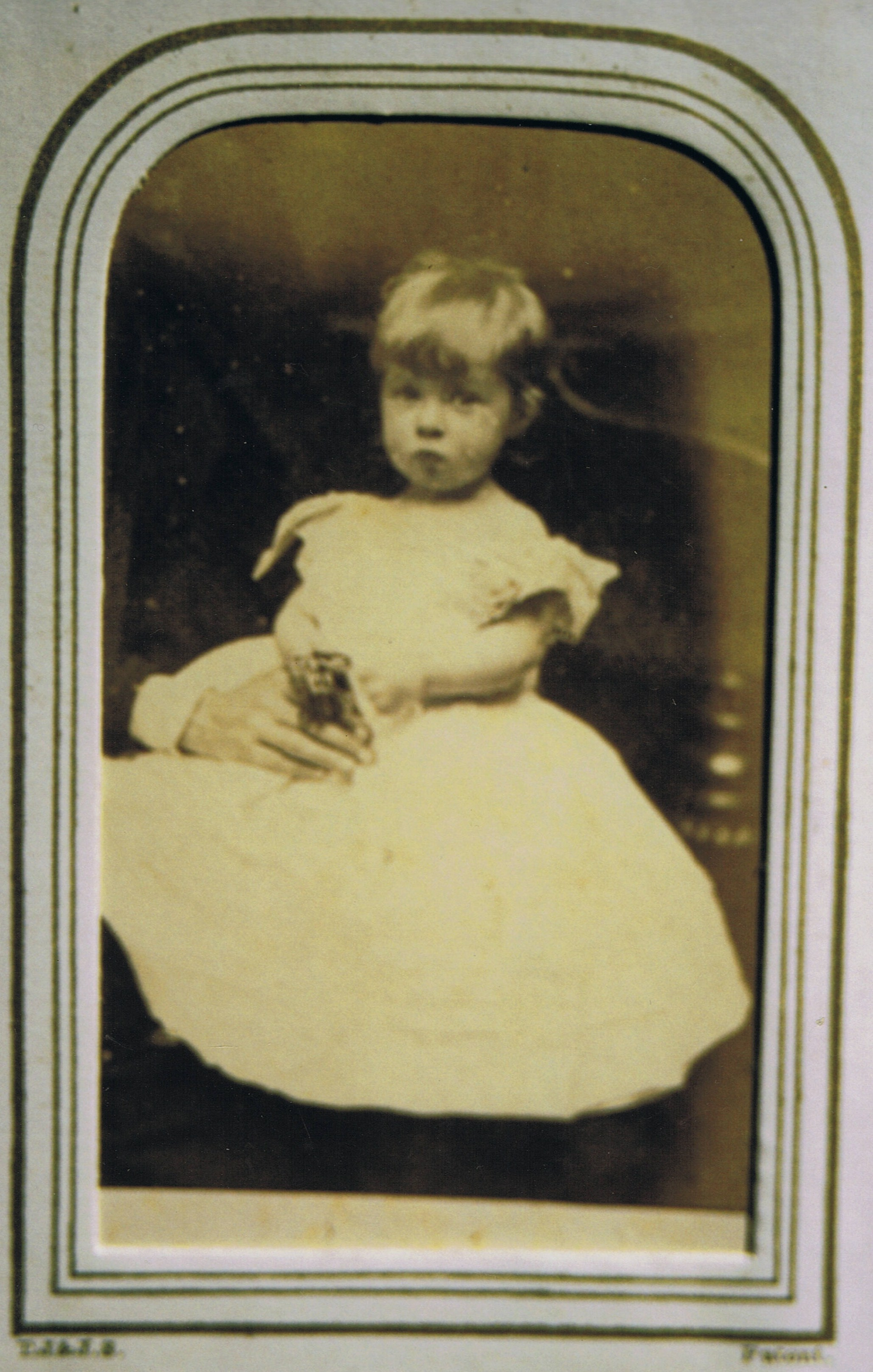
A granddaughter of the 2nd Lord de Tabley, Barbara Leighton (later Mrs Alfred Sotheby) (1870–1952), as an infant

An interest in paintings continued in the family's next generation. Sir John Fleming Leicester, the 1st Lord de Tabley, built a collection of modern British art that was hung in a gallery in his London house at Hill Street, Berkeley Square. Sir John has been described as "the first important patron of British art". In 1823 he offered his collection to Lord Liverpool to form the basis of the planned National Gallery, but the offer was declined. After his death in 1827 the best works were sold by auction and the remainder moved to Tabley, where most of them are today. Between 1808 and 1810 the three original rooms on the west side of the first floor of the house had been converted by Thomas Harrison into a single tripartite room to form a picture gallery. Further work was carried out in the room following this; Peter Cannon Brookes, the author of the 1991 guide to the house, concludes that the final appearance of the room "dates almost entirely from 1840–45".

After Sir John's death the house was structurally reorganised for George Warren, 2nd Baron de Tabley by Robert Curzon, a family friend and an "amateur architect". The house was re-orientated to move the front entrance to the north side of the house. The architecture of the north front had previously been "simple and dignified", but it was enhanced to make its appearance more impressive. The alterations included adding rustication to the bottom storey and around the central window, and quoins to the three projecting central bays. The arms of the 2nd baron were added to the previously blank pediment, and in 1915 a small porch was built over the new entrance. The south portico had become redundant, other than serving as an entrance to the garden. The new entrance led by way of a small lobby to a new staircase up to a new entrance hall on the first floor. A new dining room was created in the northeast corner.

The house and estate continued to be owned by the Leicester family until the death of Lt. Col. John Byrne Leicester Warren in 1975. The first request in his will was that the estate should if possible be taken into the care of the National Trust, but this was declined by the Trust. The executors then acted on Warren's second request, to pass the estate to a charitable institution, and thus it came into the care of the Victoria University of Manchester. By the time of Warren's death the manor of Nether Tabley, comprising the estate and the halls, had been owned by the Byrne-Leicester family for almost exactly 700 years. Col. Leicester-Warren used the house as a school from the late 1940s until 1984, after his death. In 1988 a 125-year lease of the house, the stables, and the associated buildings was sold by the university to Cygnet Health Care, on condition that the suite of rooms on the first floor of the house, and their contents, should be preserved. Between 1988 and 1990 the health care company carried out structural repairs to deal with damage caused by dry rot and the deathwatch beetle. The ground and top floors of the house, and the wings, have been converted into nursing accommodation, leaving the appearance of the exterior virtually unchanged. In 1990 the first floor was opened to the public under the care of the Tabley House Collection Trust. The original entrance by the stairway on the south front was re-instated for this purpose.

In 2007 the university sold the estate – but not the house – to the Crown Estate in a deal worth "over £35m". Its 3,600 acres (1,500 ha) included 18 tenanted farms, 18 farmland lettings, 52 residential properties and 13 commercial leases generating a total rent roll of £500,000.

== Architecture ==
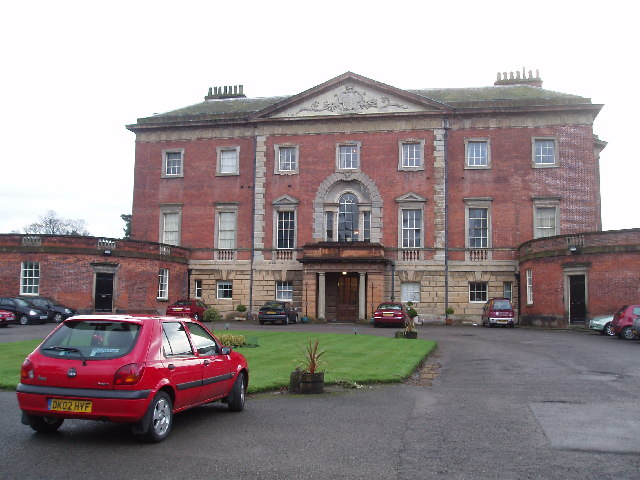
Tabley House, north front

Tabley House was designated as a Grade I listed building on 5 March 1959. Its architectural style is Palladian, the only 18th-century Palladian country house in Cheshire. The house has three storeys; the bottom storey is constructed in rusticated stone, with the upper storeys in Flemish bond brick with stone dressings. A Doric frieze runs around the whole building below the eaves. The roofs are in green slate with lead flashings. The south front has nine bays, the central three bays projecting forward. On each side of the central projection is a semi-circular stairway leading to the middle floor. The stairway is built in rusticated stone and it has a moulded balustrade. From the top of the stairway a portico rises through the top two storeys. It consists of four columns in Doric style constructed from red Runcorn sandstone. Its tympanum contains the arms of Sir Peter Byrne Leicester and his wife, Catherine. All the windows in the ground floor are sashes with 3×2 panes and over each window there are splayed voussoirs. The central bay of the middle storey contains a doorway with an architrave and a segmental pediment carried on brackets. On each side of the door is a window with similar architraves and segmental pediments, but not carried on brackets. In the lateral three bays on each side are sash windows with 3×5 panes over which are architraves and triangular pediments. The top floor windows are also sashes, these having 3×3 panes, and architraves with scrolls at the top and bottom.

The north front is also symmetrical and is in seven bays, with the central three projecting slightly forwards. Over the bays is a pediment containing the arms of the 2nd Baron de Tabley and his wife Catherina. In the centre of the ground floor is a porch, on either side of which are two 3×2 sash windows, plus a narrow two-pane window. The middle floor has a central Venetian window surrounded by a rusticated stone arch. All the other windows on this floor are 3×5 sashes; those on each side of the central window have triangular pediments, while those in the lateral bays have horizontal architraves. The top storey has seven 3×3 sash windows; the central three have scrolls similar to those on the south front, while the surrounds to the lateral two windows on each side are plainer.

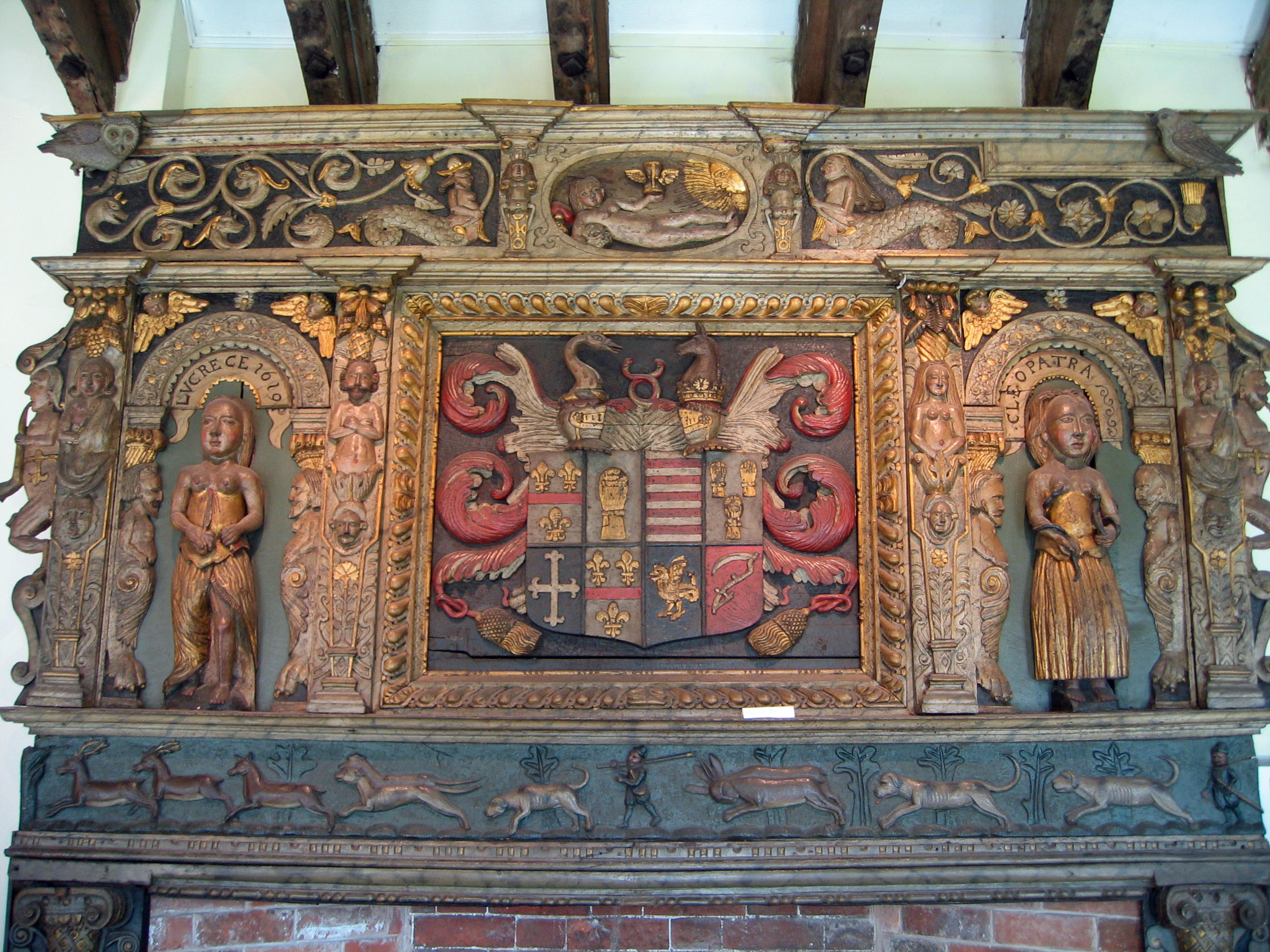
Top of an ornately carved, painted and gilded chimneypiece with female figures on the sides and a coat of arms at the centre

On each side elevation there are central canted bay windows. The middle floor has arched windows on the west front, while the corresponding windows on the east front are blind. On each side of the house are two-storey pavilion wings joined to the main block by quadrant (curved), single-storey corridors. Each pavilion is symmetrical and identical, built in brick with stone dressings. Each is in three bays, the central bay forming a canted bay window. Again, the windows are sashes.

To the east of the house, and linked to it by the Old Hall Room, is St Peter's Chapel. Incorporated in the Old Hall Room (now used as the tea room) is the painted and gilded wooden chimney-piece from the Old Hall, which had been installed in the Old Hall by Sir Peter Leycester in 1619. It includes carvings of caryatids, statues of Lucretia and Cleopatra in niches, and a female nude lying on a skull and holding an hourglass. The windows in the Old Hall Room contain stained glass panels with various designs, including depictions of English monarchs from William II to George II.

== Interior ==
The entrance to the first floor on the south front leads to a room now known as the Portico Room. This was the original entrance hall to the house, but as a result of the 19th-century alterations it was converted into a billiard room. It was later used as a drawing room, and during the time the house was used as a school, it was the school library. From 1990 it has been restored as the entrance hall. It contains a white chimney-piece and a cast iron grate. The mahogany woodwork was carved by Daniel Shillito and Mathew Bertram and the plasterwork was by Thomas Oliver. In the side walls are plaster figures of Isis and the Capitoline Flora in niches, and on the walls are plaster relief medallions representing the four seasons. Much of the furniture in the room has been moved from elsewhere in the house. The breakfast table carries the mark of the Lancaster firm of Gillow. The lantern suspended from the middle of the ceiling was made by Ince and Mayhew in about 1770, and was restored by Plowden and Smith in 1998.

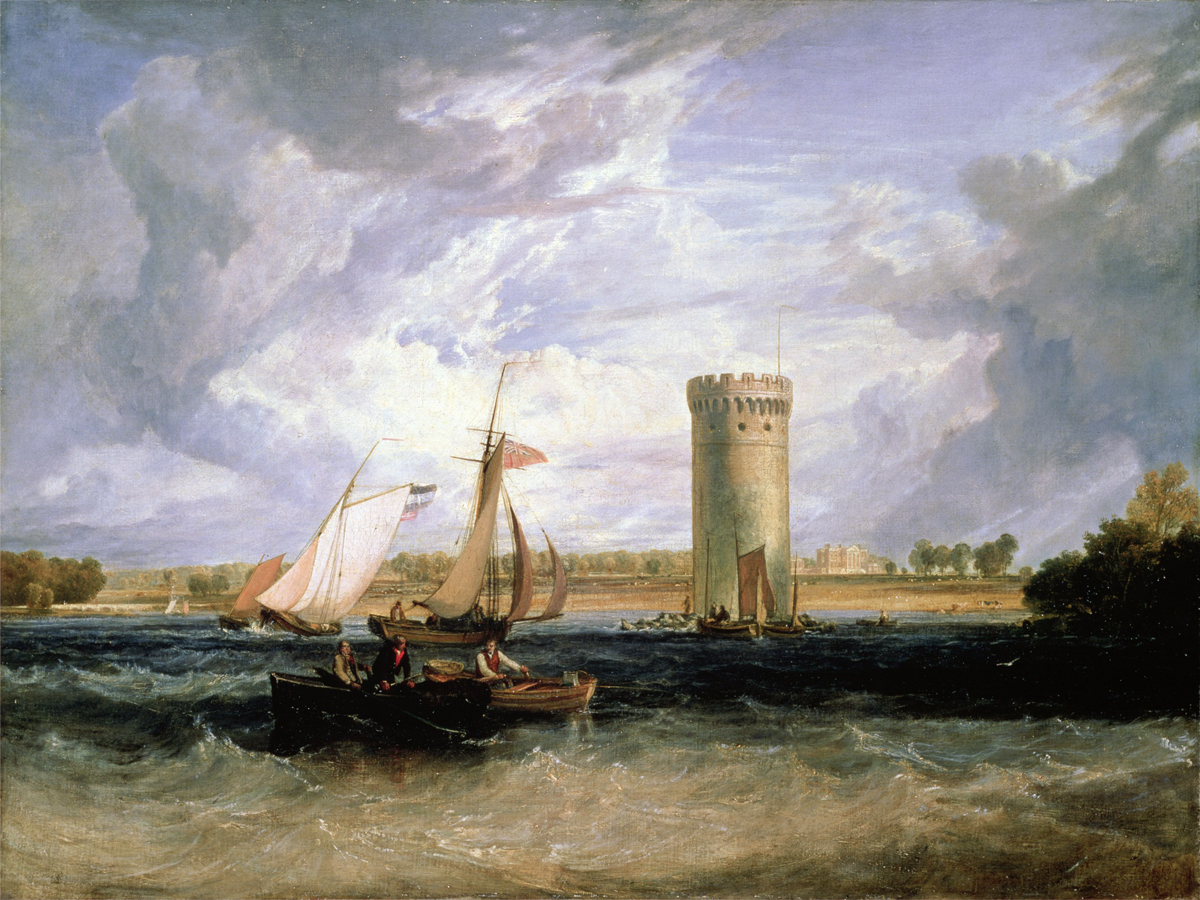
Tabley, Windy Day by J. M. W. Turner (1808)

To the east of the Portico Room is the Drawing Room. This was designed by Carr as the dining room, and contains a white marble chimneypiece designed by Carr. The plasterwork is again by Oliver. The furniture and paintings are original to the house. The paintings include one of John, 1st Baron Byron by William Dobson, one of his wife as Saint Catherine by Peter Lely, and two paintings by John Opie. The most important painting in the room is Tabley, the Seat of Sir J. F. Leicester, Bart: Windy Day, by J. M. W. Turner. Also in the room are two still life paintings by Thomas Lister, 4th Baron Ribblesdale, a cousin of the Leicesters. The Drawing Room also contains a 1824 version of The Destruction of Pompeii and Herculaneum by John Martin. The prime version of the work, held by the Tate in London, which was badly damaged in the 1928 Thames flood, was restored in 2008 with the aid of this version.

The room to the north of the Drawing Room was originally the common parlour, and is now known as the Octagon Room. It provided a link between the public rooms on the south of the house and the more private rooms on the north side. Again designed by Carr, its canted corners contain china cabinets. It also contains a set of five paintings of Tabley by Anthony Devis. The ceiling has Rococo plasterwork by Oliver. This room leads to the Dining Room on the north side of the house, which contains paintings of the Leicester family. These include 3rd Lord Tabley by Frank Holl, Colonel Sir John Leicester, Bart., and the King's Cheshire Yeomanry Cavalry exercising on the Sands at Liverpool by George Jones, Portrait of 2nd Lord de Tabley by Margaret Carpenter, a full-length Portrait of 2nd Lord de Tabley as Colonel Commandant of the Earl of Chester's Yeomanry Cavalry by Francis Grant, Hilda, Mrs Cuthbert Leicester Warren by Simon Elwes, Lt. Colonel John Leicester Warren by Graham Rust, and Margaret Leicester Warren by Philip de László. Also in the room is Extensive Picturesque Landscape, with Gypsies by Francis Bourgeois and, over the sideboard, is the Portrait of the Prince Regent, later George IV by Thomas Lawrence and his studio. The fireplace in the Dining Room is made from Anglesey marble and was designed by George Bullock.

In the centre of the first floor is the Oak Hall, so-called because of the oaks formerly growing on the site of the new hall. It contains a mahogany four-flight staircase. The staircase has triple balusters, and was carved by Shillito. Again the plasterwork is by Oliver. More family portraits hang on its walls and the hall's contents include a hobby horse, a man trap, and an 18th-century sedan chair. Also in the hall is a memorial display for Tabley House School. The other room on the north side of the house is known as the Marble Hall. This was created from Carr's original rooms in the 19th-century alterations. It contains five reliefs on its wall, one of which depicts the nine muses.

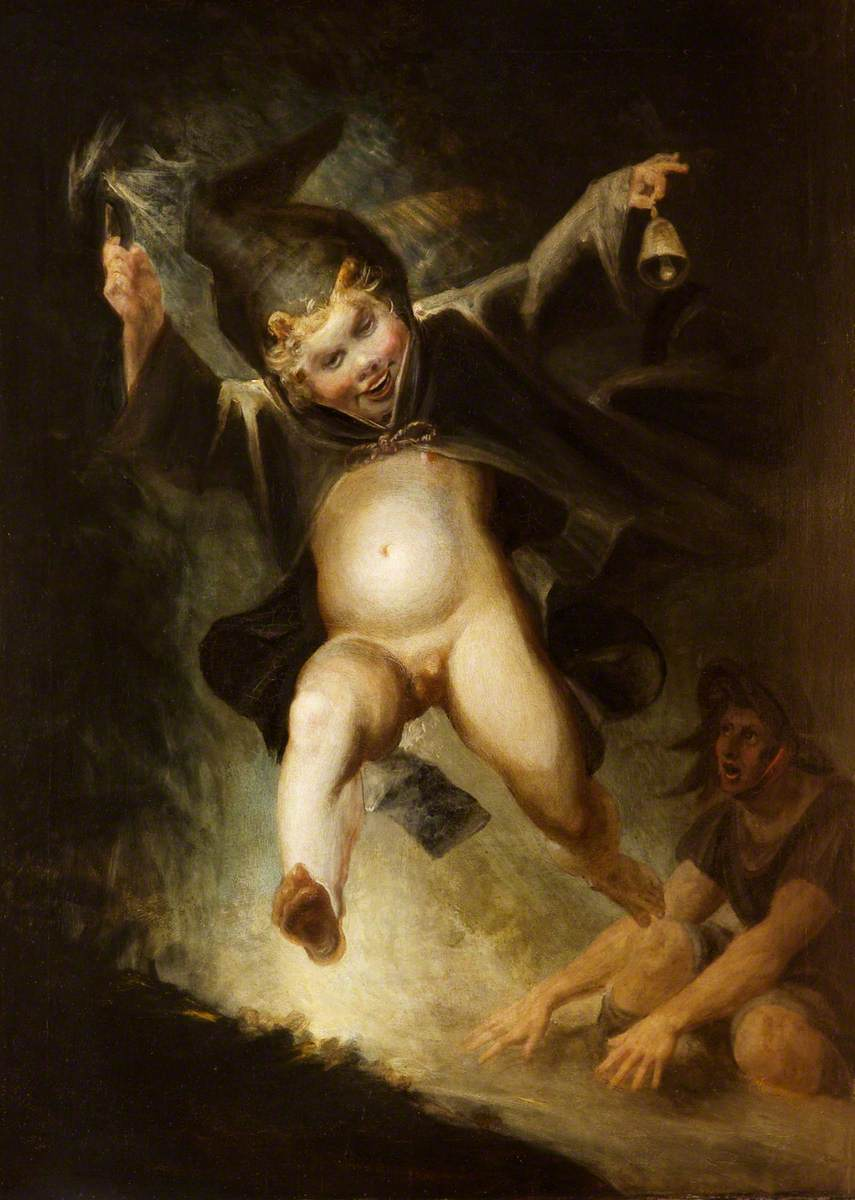
Friar Puck by Henry Fuseli

The west side of the first floor is occupied by the gallery, which has been described as "one of the great rooms of Cheshire". It contains most of the finest furniture from the house. The items include mirrors and marble tops attributed to the London workshops of Thomas Chippendale, and sofas attributed to George Bullock. There is more furniture by Gillow as well as two virginal, brought from the Old Hall: one is a four-and-a-half octave instrument by Phillip Jones from 1761, and the second a three-and-a-half octave instrument from the late 17th century, which is probably Italian. Both are in working order and can still be played. Paintings in the gallery include the Portrait of Sir John Fleming Leicester, 1st Lord de Tabley, in Peer's Robes, started by Joshua Reynolds and completed by James Northcote, and Portrait of Georgiana Maria Lady Leicester by Lawrence. There are more paintings by Northcote and Lawrence, and others by Julius Caesar Ibbetson, William Hilton, Charles Robert Leslie, Francis Cotes, Augustus Wall Callcott, and George Henry Harlow. Two paintings, Friar Puck by Henry Fuseli and The Fall of Phaeton by James Ward, were originally in Sir John Leicester's London Gallery but were sold in 1827. They were bought back at auction by the 2nd Lord de Tabley in the mid-19th-century.

== Grounds ==
The grounds cover an area of about 240 hectares (590 acres) and are listed Grade II in the Register of Historic Parks and Gardens of Special Historic Interest in England. What remains of Tabley Old Hall consists of its shell in three storeys, constructed in red English garden wall bond brick with stone dressings. The ruin is listed at Grade II*, and its moated site and gatehouse are a scheduled monument. To the north of the Old Hall is Moat Farm. One of the farm buildings, dating from the mid-17th century, is listed at Grade II. By Tabley Mere is a boathouse in brick with stone dressings, but lacking a roof, in Gothic style; it is listed at Grade II. On an island in the mere is a folly tower, dating from about 1780, constructed in red brick. It is a circular structure in three storeys, with machicolations and battlements at its summit. The folly is also listed at Grade II.

To the north of Tabley House, off Chester Road, are two entrance lodges, each of which is listed at Grade II. The White Lodge dates from about 1770 and was probably designed by John Carr. It is constructed in whitewashed English garden wall bond brick with a slate roof. The Red Lodge dates from the late 19th century; it is constructed in English garden wall bond brick with timber framing, and has a tiled roof. St Peter's Church to the west of the house is a Grade I listed building. It is joined to the house by a linking building, constructed in 1927–29 in red Flemish bond brick with stone dressings and a stone slate roof. The linking building is listed at Grade II. To the south of the house is a sundial dating from the early 19th century constructed in stone with a copper dial and gnomon; it is listed at Grade II. To the south of this is a parterre wall, about 1 metre (3 ft) high, constructed in red Flemish bond brick, with piers carrying stone balls. It is also listed at Grade II.

To the north of the house is the former stable block dating from about 1760, designed by John Carr. It was converted and extended in 1995–96. The block is constructed in red brick with stone dressings and green slate roofs. Although it has been altered since it was originally built, it has maintained its Grade II listing for its "group value", recognising "the importance of its massing and exterior character to the setting of Tabley House". To the north of the stable block is a dovecote dating from about 1760. It is an octagonal structure in two storeys built in red brick with a slate roof, and is listed at Grade II. The grounds are promoted by the Campaign to Protect Rural England.

== Present day ==
The ground and top floors of the main house, and the wings, are run as Tabley House Nursing Home by Cygnet Health Care, with a separate entrance. The Tabley House Collection exists as an exhibition showcased by the University of Manchester. The rooms on the first floor, with their collection of paintings and furniture, have been open to the public since 1990. These rooms are open at advertised times during the summer months, as is the tea room in the Old Hall Room. The hall is licensed for civil weddings and is available to hire for conferences and meetings. Occasional events are organised at the house. Tabley House is managed by the Tabley House Collection Trust. It is supported by a group known as The Friends of Tabley, and by volunteers.

== Gallery ==
Portrait of Lord Byron by William Dobson, 1643

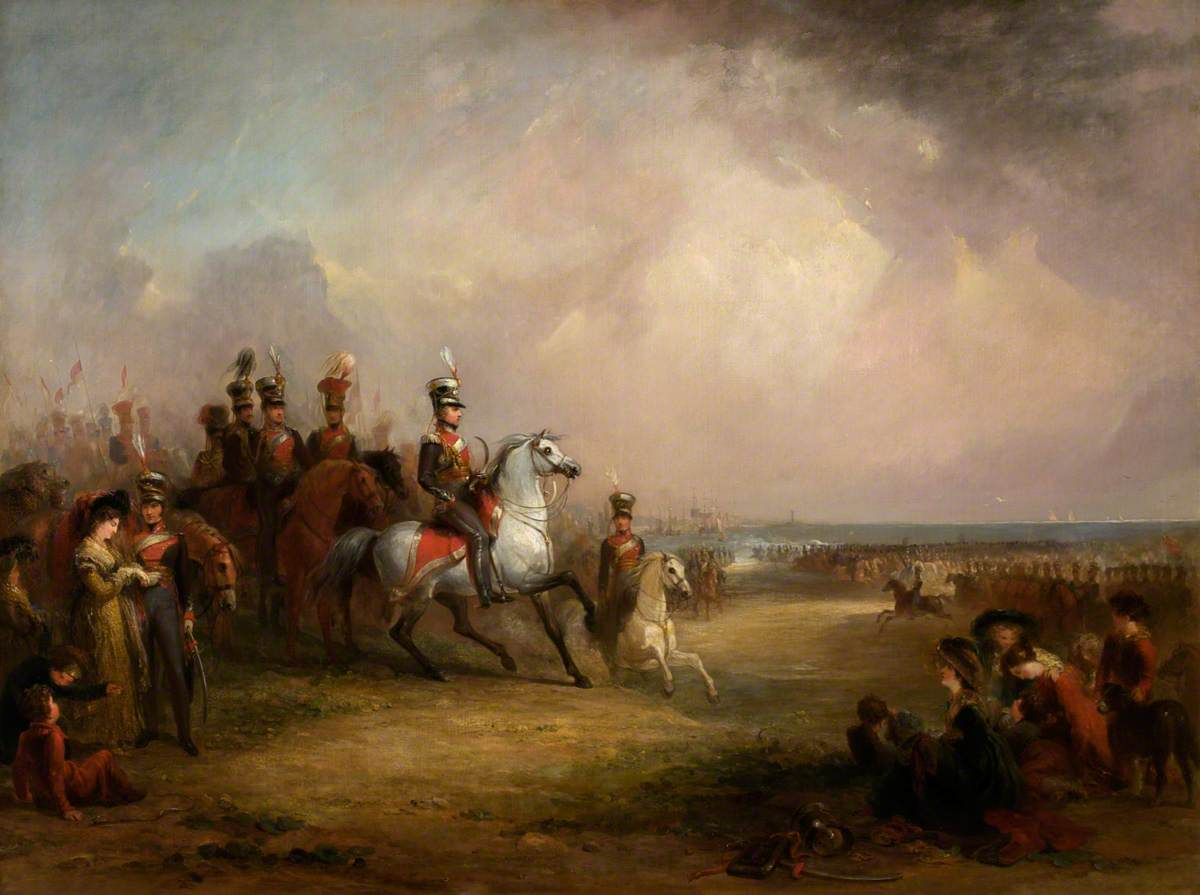
Sir John Leicester and the Cheshire Yeomanry Exercising on the Sands at Liverpool by George Jones, 1824

== See also ==
- Grade I listed buildings in Cheshire East
- Listed buildings in Tabley Inferior
- List of works by Thomas Harrison
