= Tabley Inferior =

Coordinates: 53.294°N 2.424°W

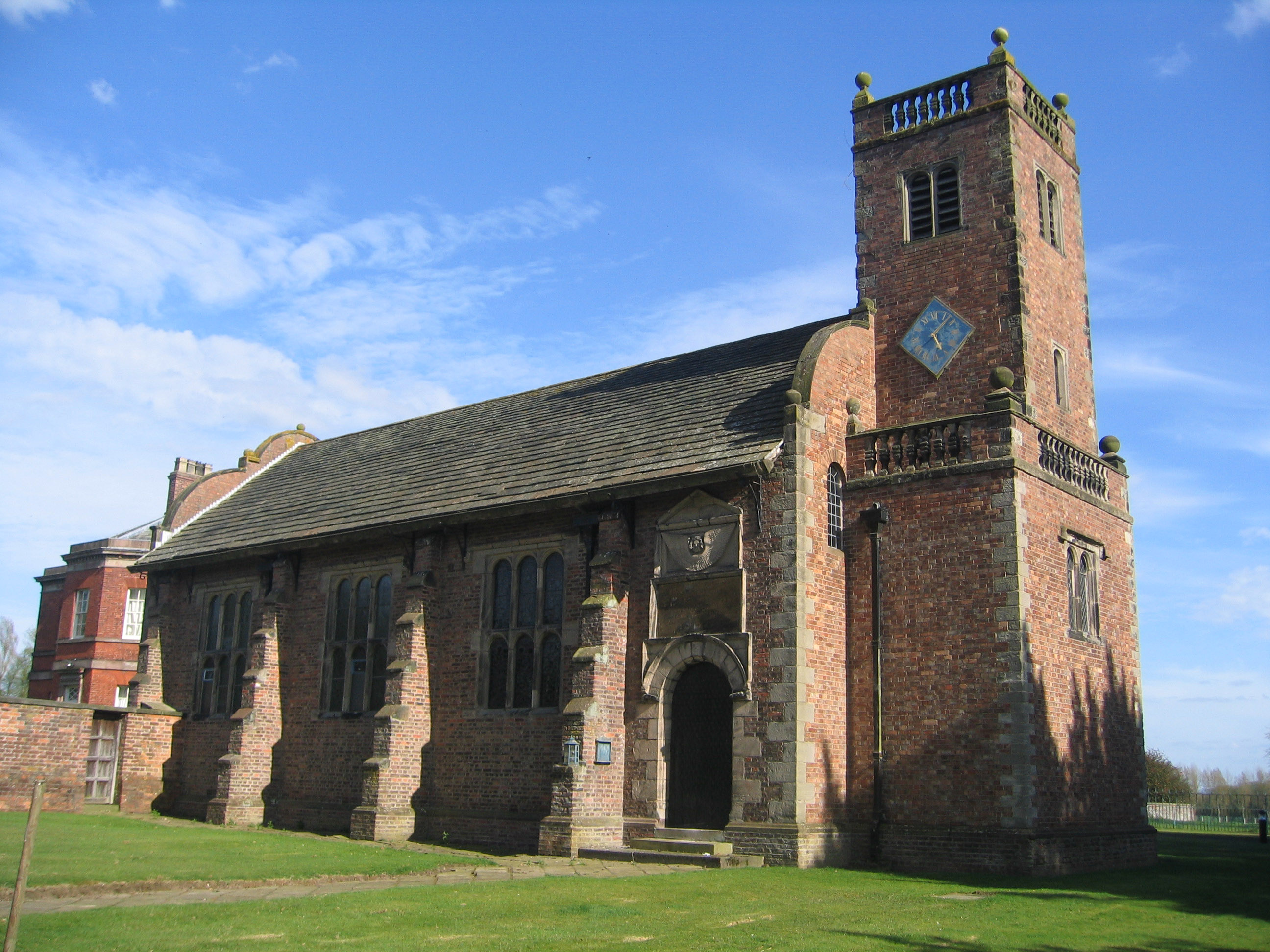
- St, Peter's Chapel, Tabley

- Location within Cheshire
- Population: 137 (2001)
- OS grid reference: SJ717776
- Civil parish: Tabley Inferior
- Unitary authority: Cheshire East
- Ceremonial county: Cheshire
- Region: North West
- Country: England
- Sovereign state: United Kingdom
- Post town: KNUTSFORD
- Postcode district: WA16
- Dialling code: 01565
- Police: Cheshire
- Fire: Cheshire
- Ambulance: North West
- UK Parliament: Tatton

Tabley Inferior is a civil parish in the Borough of Cheshire East and ceremonial county of Cheshire in England. It has a population of 137. Tabley House is located there.

The Windmill public house, located near Junction 19 of the M6, is a tied house owned by Robinsons Brewery. Originally the site of a 16th-century listed building, it has been totally rebuilt. The name commemorates a racehorse once owned by former local landowner Lord de Tabley. It now has a large restaurant.

== See also ==
- Listed buildings in Tabley Inferior
