= Peter Leycester =

British historian; (1614–1678)

Sir Peter Leycester
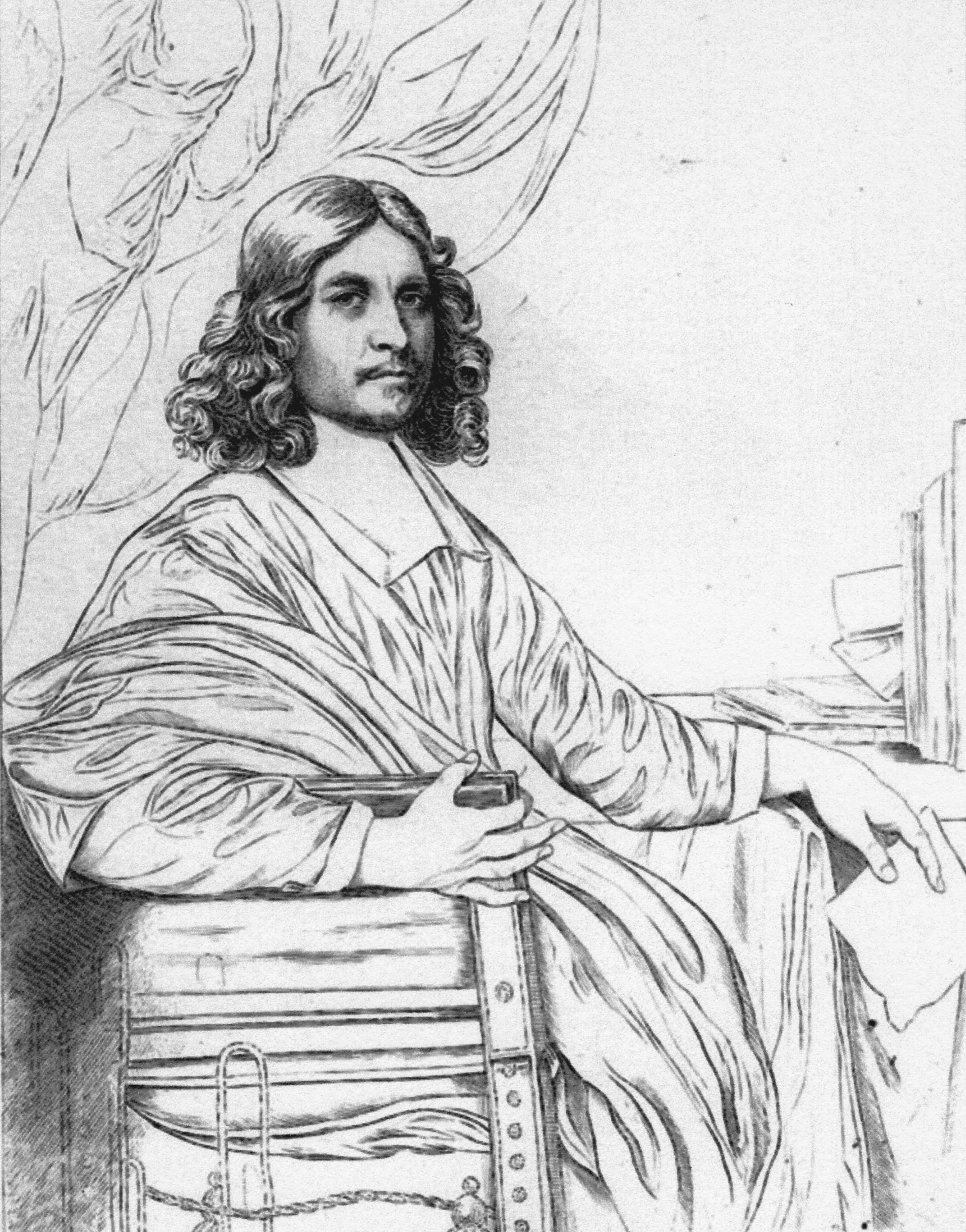
- Sir Peter Leycester in 1665
- Born: 3 March 1614; Nether Tabley, Cheshire, England
- Died: 11 October 1678 (aged 64); Nether Tabley
- Education: Brasenose College, Oxford; Gray's Inn
- Occupations: Antiquarian, Historian
- Title: Baronet
- Spouse: Elizabeth Gerard
- Children: Robert, Byron I, Elinour, Elizabeth, Thomas, Byron II
- Parent(s): Peter Leycester; Elizabeth Mainwaring

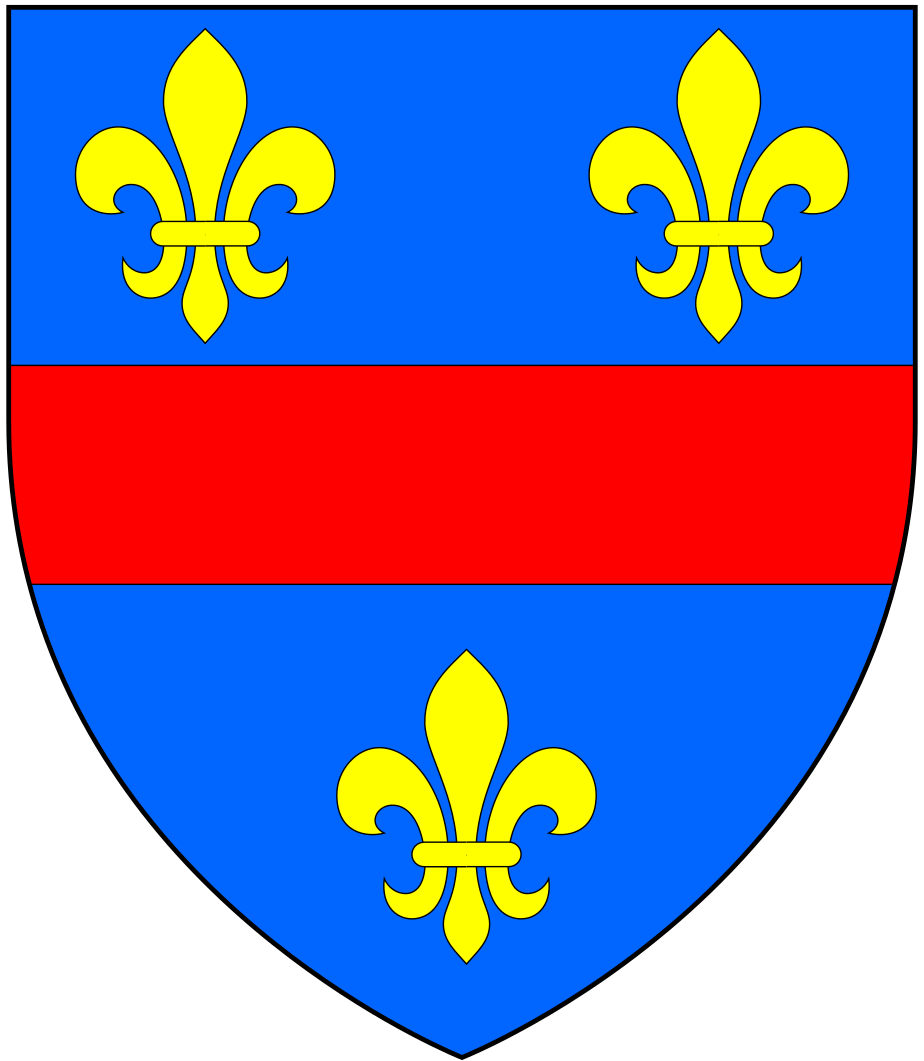
Arms of Leycester of Tabley Old Hall, Cheshire: Azure, a fess gules between three fleurs-de-lys or. The arms of Leycester are a known contravention of the heraldic "Rule of tincture"

Sir Peter Leycester, 1st Baronet (also known as Sir Peter Leicester) (3 March 1614 – 11 October 1678) was an English antiquarian and historian. He was involved in the English Civil War on the royalist side and was subsequently made a baronet. He later compiled one of the earliest histories of the county of Cheshire and as a result of this became involved in a controversy with the Mainwaring family. He developed a library in his home at Tabley Old Hall and made improvements to the house and estate, including building a private chapel in the grounds of the house. He was an active and conscientious justice of the peace and used his position on the Bench to expound his staunchly conservative and Royalist political views.

== Biography ==
Peter Leycester was born at Nether Tabley, near Knutsford, Cheshire, England, the eldest son of Peter Leycester (1588–1647) and Elizabeth Mainwaring, a daughter of Sir Randle Mainwaring of Over Peover, Cheshire. He entered Brasenose College, Oxford in 1629 as a gentleman commoner but did not take a degree. In 1632 he was admitted to Gray's Inn. When the Civil War started he was appointed as one of the king's commissioners of array for Cheshire. He was in Oxford in June 1646 when the city surrendered to Thomas Fairfax. Consequently, he was excluded from other responsibilities and had time to develop his interest in antiquarian research. Among the subjects he studied was the pedigree of the Mainwaring family. In 1649 he purchased a transcript of the section of the Domesday Book relating to Cheshire. In 1655 he had a period of imprisonment, but following the Restoration he was released and returned to the bench as a justice of the peace. In this capacity, according to a modern historian, he harangued grand juries with warnings on the constant dangers of sedition and revolution, and the need to maintain a vigilant watch on all Roman Catholics, especially Jesuits, as well as republicans, Puritans and anyone else who threatened the existing social order. He was created a baronet in 1660 as a reward for his loyalty to the royalist cause.

== Historical antiquities ==
His major historical work appeared in 1673, its full title being Historical antiquities in two books; the first treating in general of Great Britain and Ireland; the second containing particular remarks concerning Cheshire, and chiefly of the Bucklow hundred. Whereunto is annexed a transcript of Domesday-Book, so far as it concerneth Cheshire; it is usually referred to with the shorter title of Historical antiquities. In the book, Leycester presented a discussion relating to the legitimacy of Amicia, the wife of Ralph Mainwaring, as to whether or not she was the lawful daughter of Earl Hugh Cyveliok. This led to a dispute with Sir Thomas Mainwaring of Peover, one of her descendants, who in 1673 published a Defence of Amicia. Leycester replied later that year with An Answer to the Book of Sir Thomas Manwaringe. After this there followed a paper war of 15 pamphlets. In 1675 the justices itinerant at Chester assizes declared in favour of Amicia's legitimacy.

== Personal life ==
Leycester made a large collection of books and manuscripts in his library at Tabley, compiling a catalogue of 1,332 books in 1672. He produced a musical treatise entitled Prolegomena historica de musica P. L. and a theological dissertation On the soul of man. On his estate, he made major improvements, including building a private chapel in his garden between 1675 and 1678. Leycester also assembled a manuscript titled Lessons for the Lyra Viol. It consists of over 100 works for solo lyra viol. Many of the works appear in other collections. One work has an associated date of 1670. The preface to this manuscript includes pages discussing the history of music.

In 1642 he married Elizabeth Gerard, the third daughter of Gilbert, 2nd Baron Gerard of Gerards Bromley and his first wife Elizabeth Dutton, at Dutton, Cheshire. They had three sons and three daughters. He died at his home in 1678 and was buried at Great Budworth, Cheshire. His memorial is in the north chapel of St Mary and All Saints Church, Great Budworth. He was succeeded in the baronetage by his eldest son, Sir Robert Leicester (1643–84).

== See also ==
- St Peter's Church, Tabley

Baronetage of England
| New creation | Baronet (of Nether Tabley); 1660–1678 | Succeeded by Robert Leicester |
