= Ante-chapel =

Portion of a chapel on the western side of the choir screen

The ante-chapel is that portion of a chapel which lies on the western side of the choir screen.

In some of the colleges at Oxford and Cambridge the ante-chapel is carried north and south across the west end of the chapel, constituting a western transept or narthex. This model, based on Merton College chapel (13th century), of which only chancel and transept were built though a nave was projected, was followed at Wadham, New and Magdalen Colleges, Oxford, in the new chapel of St John's College, Cambridge, and in Eton College. In Jesus College, Cambridge, the transept and a short nave constitute the ante-chapel; in Clare College an octagonal vestibule serves the same purpose; in Christ's, Trinity and King's Colleges, Cambridge, the ante-chapel is a portion of the main chapel, divided off from the chancel by the choir screen.
