= Lismore, New South Wales =

City in New South Wales, Australia

Lismore Tuckurimbah (Bandjalang)
- City
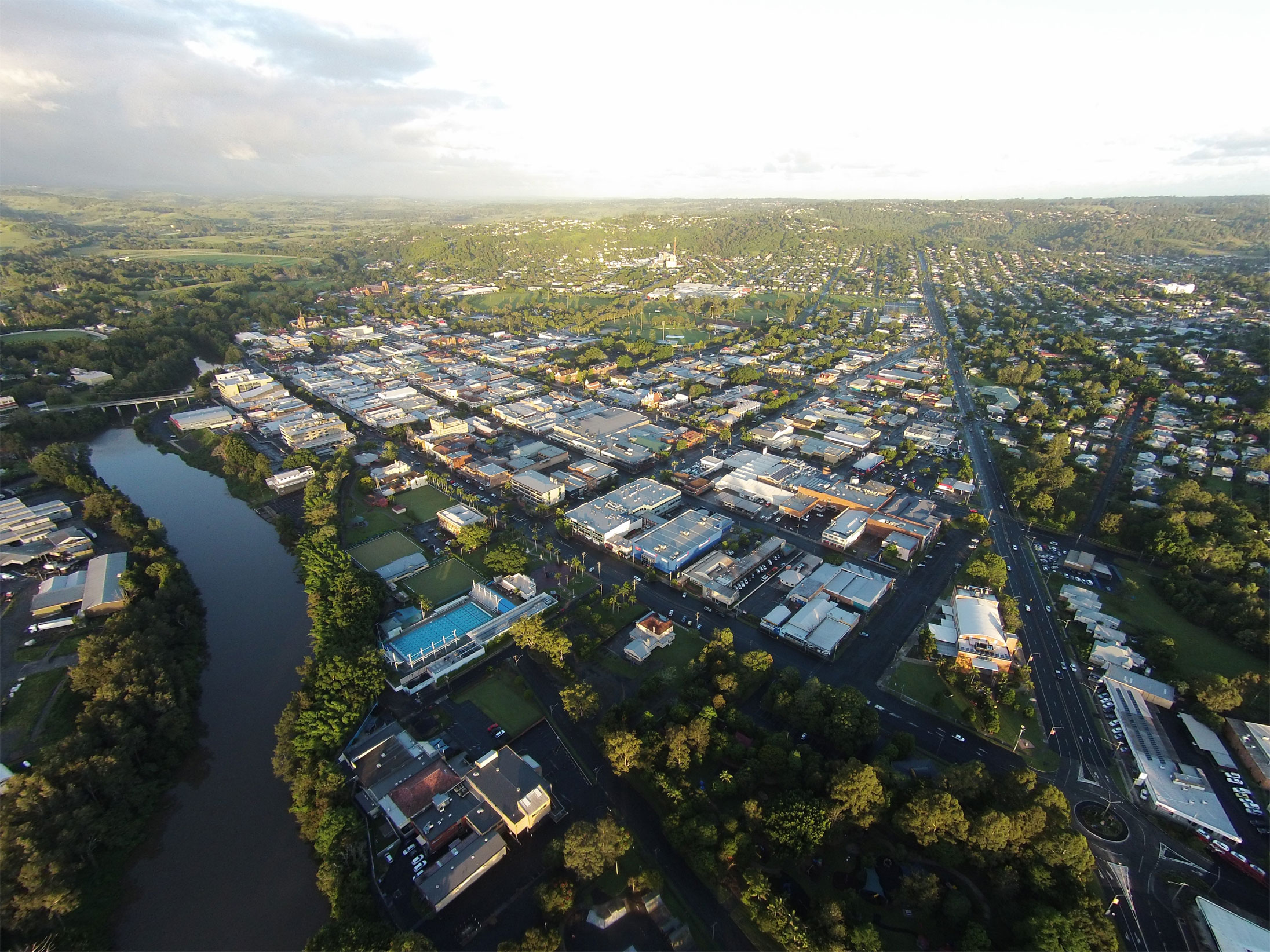
- Lismore from helicopter, overlooking the Bruxner Highway and Lismore CBD

- Coordinates: 28°49′0″S 153°17′0″E
- Country: Australia
- State: New South Wales
- LGA: City of Lismore
- Location: 734 km (456 mi) NNE of Sydney; 200 km (120 mi) S of Brisbane; 46 km (29 mi) SW of Byron Bay; 32 km (20 mi) W of Ballina; 35 km (22 mi) S of Nimbin
- Established: 1856

Government
  - State electorate: Lismore
  - Federal division: Page
- Elevation: 12 m (39 ft)

Population
  - Total: 28,816 (2021 census)
- Postcode: 2480
- County: Rous
- Mean max temp: 25.5 °C (77.9 °F)
- Mean min temp: 13.2 °C (55.8 °F)
- Annual rainfall: 1,343.0 mm (52.87 in)

Lismore is a city located in the Northern Rivers region of New South Wales, Australia and the main population centre in the City of Lismore local government area, it is also a regional centre in the Northern Rivers region of the state.

Lismore is 734 km (456 mi) north of Sydney and 200 km (120 mi) south of Brisbane. It is situated on a low floodplain on the banks of the Wilsons River near the latter's junction with Leycester Creek, both tributaries of the Richmond River which enters the Pacific Ocean at Ballina, 30 km (19 mi) to the east.

Lismore is on the traditional lands of the Widjabul/Wia-bal people of the Bundjalung nation who are the traditional owners of the land.

The original settlement initially developed as a grazing property in the 1840s, then became a timber and agricultural town and inland port based around substantial river traffic, which prior to the development of the road and rail networks was the principal means of transportation in the region. Use of the river for transport declined and then ceased around the mid-twentieth century, however by that time Lismore (which was elevated to city status in 1946) had become well established as the largest urban centre in the region, providing its surrounding area with a range of services. The city is also located on the Bruxner Highway which crosses the Wilsons River at Lismore, and was formerly a stop on the Casino-Murwillumbah railway line. It is the home of one of the three campuses of Southern Cross University.

With its low-lying position adjacent to the Wilsons River, which can rise rapidly following periods of high rainfall in its catchment, the centre of Lismore is susceptible to flooding, although it is partly protected by a system of levees and flood gates. Noteworthy recent floods occurred in 1974, 2017 in the aftermath of Cyclone Debbie and the worst ever in 2022. A budget was announced for additional flood mitigation works in November 2018.

At the 2021 census, the urban population of Lismore was 28,816.

== European history ==
=== Early colonial history ===
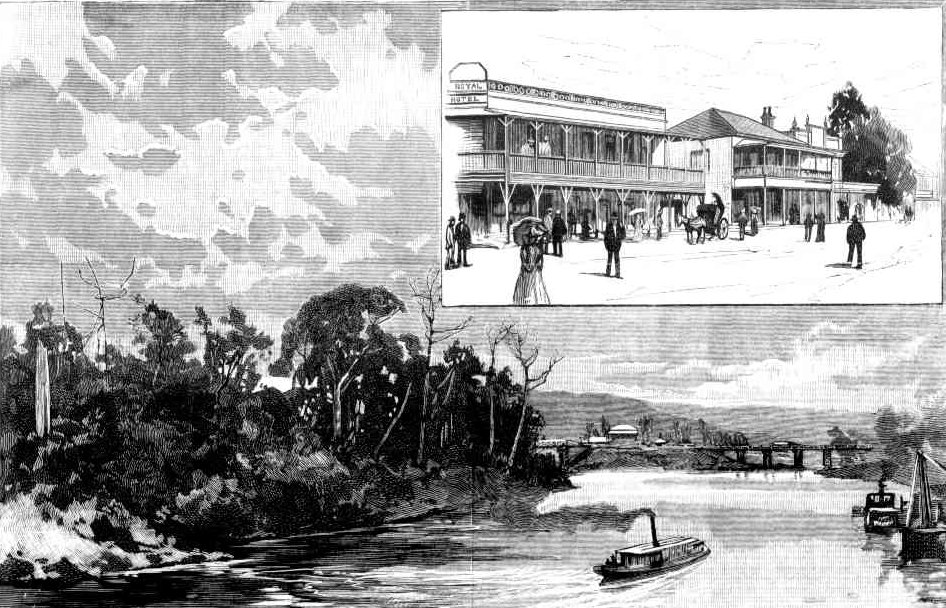
Lismore, NSW in 1894 - illustration from Sydney Mail May 12, 1894 (upper portion)

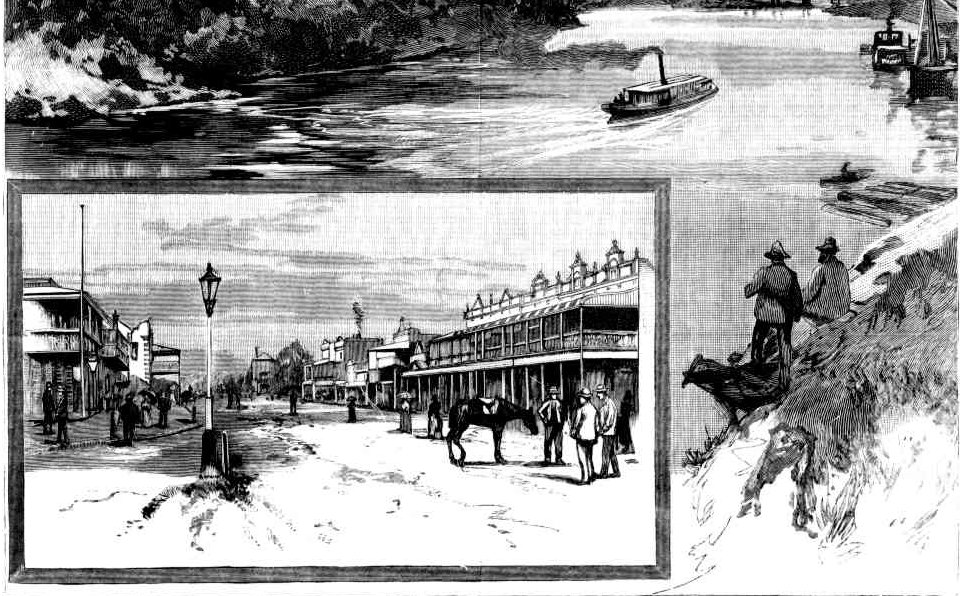
Lismore, NSW in 1894 - illustration from Sydney Mail May 12, 1894 (lower portion)

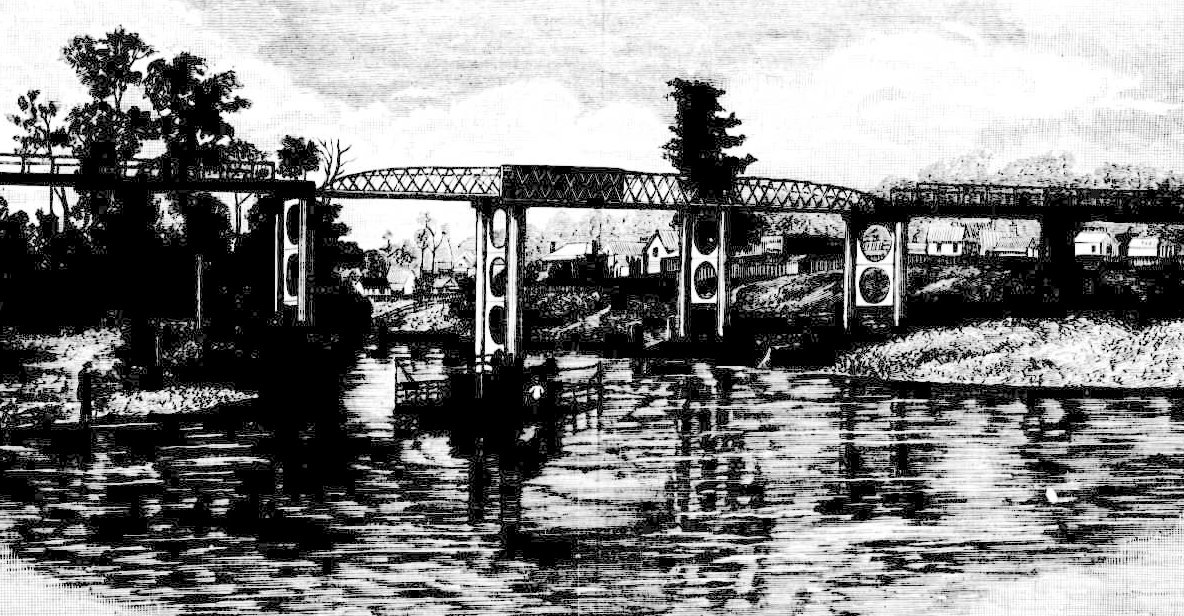
Fawcett Bridge with Colemans Point behind, newly opened, 1884

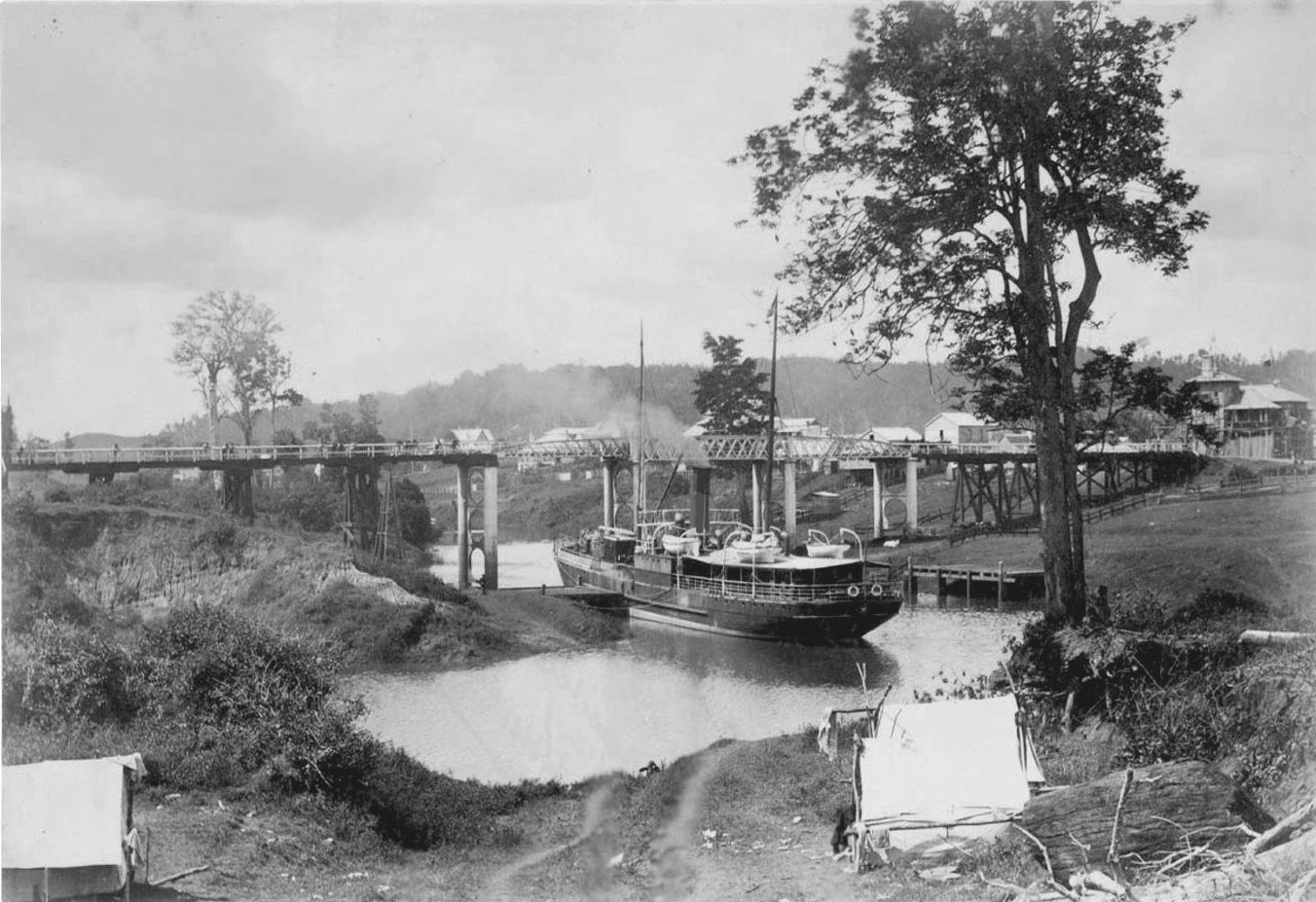
"A Bridge at Lismore" (Fawcett Bridge), photo c.1901

The British history of the city begins in c. 1843: a pastoral run covering an area of 93 square kilometres (36 sq mi) was taken up by Captain Dumaresq at this time covering the Lismore area and was stocked with sheep from the New England area. Ward Stephens took up the run in the same year, but the subtropical climate was unsuited for sheep grazing, so it was eventually abandoned. In January 1845, William and Jane Wilson took it over. The Wilsons were Scottish immigrants, who arrived in New South Wales in May 1833. Mrs. Wilson named the property after the small island of Lismore, one of the Inner Hebrides in Loch Linnhe, Argyleshire.

In 1855, the surveyor Frederick Peppercorne was instructed by Sir Thomas Mitchell to determine a site for a township in the area. Peppercorne submitted his map of the proposed village reserve on 16 February 1856. The chosen site was William Wilson's homestead paddock and the area was proclaimed the "Town of Lismore" in the NSW Government Gazette on 1 May 1856. The township was soon settled and its post office was opened on 1 October 1859. The Wilson family then established a new homestead at Monaltrie, some 6 km south of Lismore, in 1861 which still survives and has been stated to be "Lismore's oldest home", although the Lismore "Northern Star" has elsewhere given that distinction to a timber-built home "Locheil" in Bouyon Street, North Lismore, stated to date from 1860 and originally occupied by Mr and Mrs John Jones, later a private hospital and local maternity hospital between 1911 and 1917. Both "Monaltrie" and "Locheil" are included on the list of Lismore Heritage items, along with other sites and structures of historic significance.

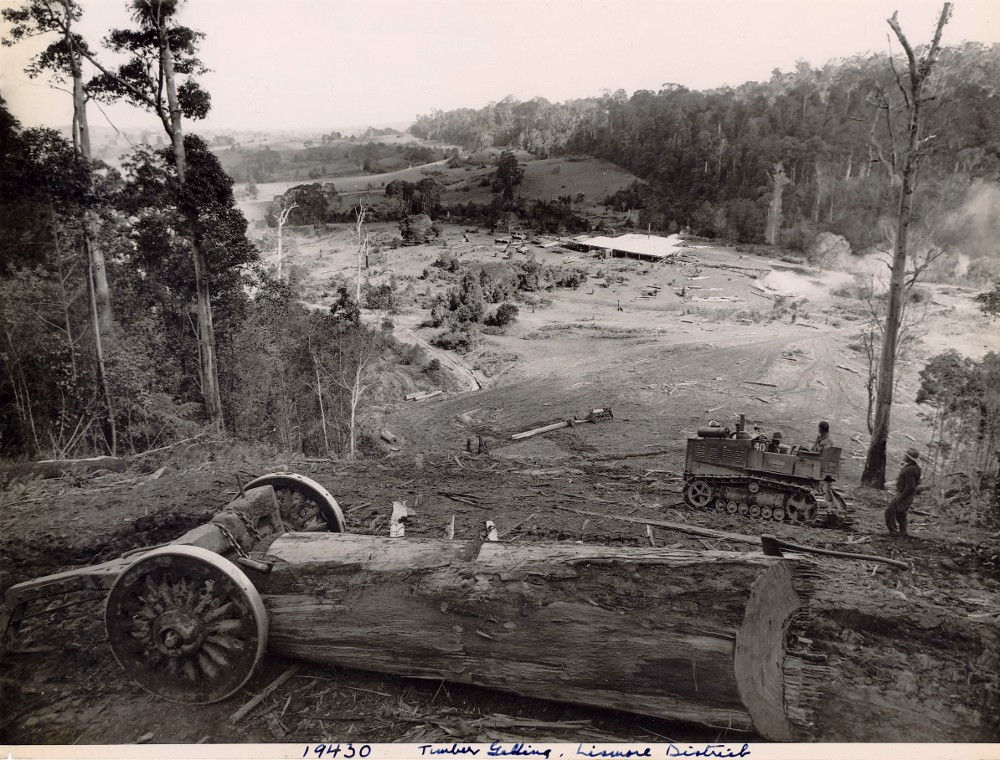
Historic photograph of timber getting in the Lismore district, probably early-mid 20th century (additional details unknown)

From the 1840s onwards, timber cutters moved up the Richmond River from its Ballina entrance felling timber from the extensive, previously untouched subtropical rainforest covering the region known as the "Big Scrub"; their primary interest was the Australian red cedar, Toona ciliata, known locally as "red gold", which was highly prized for its appearance, ease of working, and pest resistance. At that time there was no substantial network of roads so rivers were the primary means of access and bulk transportation. Despite its low-lying position and propensity for flooding (which was to cause problems in subsequent times), Lismore developed as an inland port owing to its location at the highest navigable point for large cargo-carrying vessels on the north arm of the Richmond, later renamed the Wilsons, River. For the second half of the 19th century the primary industries of the Lismore region continued to be cattle grazing and timber, supporting a growing economy and population and the development of secondary industries which included ship building, transportation, saw milling, tallow manufacturing and more. As the Big Scrub was cleared, it was steadily replaced with new pasture which formed the basis of a flourishing dairy industry, and many processing plants ("butter factories") and dairy cooperatives were established throughout the region. Infrastructure development in Lismore continued, including the presence of three schools by 1879, a new Government Wharf in 1880, two new bridges over the river in 1884 and 1885, the railway station (1894) and a new post office building (1898); by the end of that century Lismore had a population of over 4,500, although had suffered from some ravages including numerous floods plus a period of drought in the last half of the 1890s.

=== 20th century and beyond ===
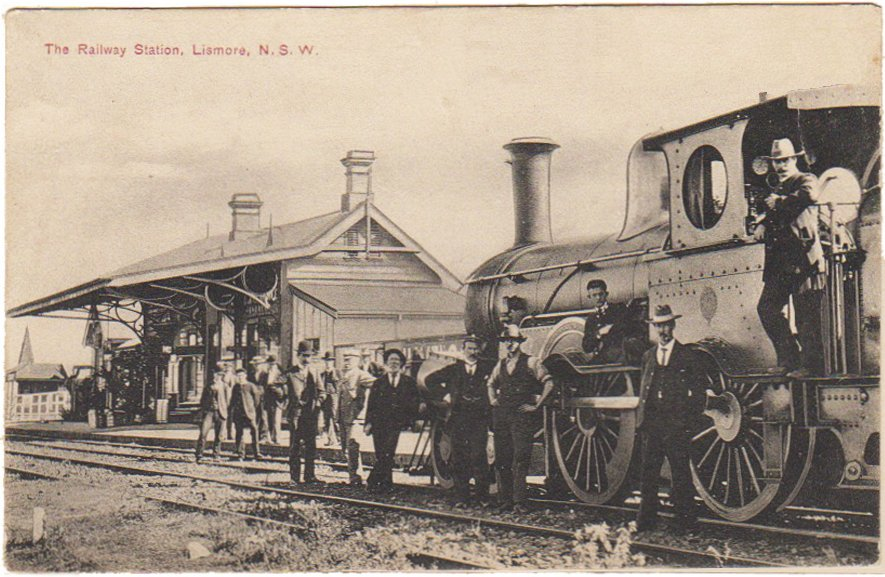
Lismore Railway Station in the early 1900s (from an old postcard)

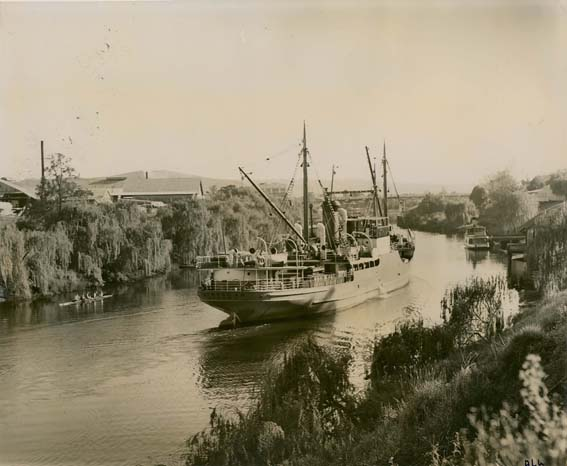
A large vessel (?S.S. Wyrallah) on the then Richmond (now Wilsons) River at Lismore, probably early-mid 20th century (additional details unknown)

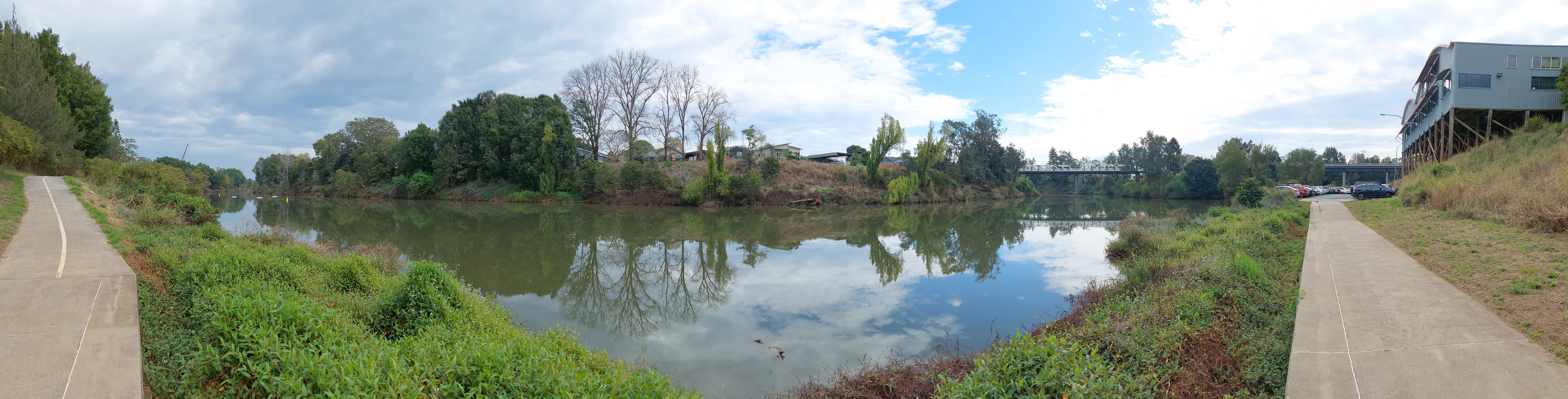
Its traffic now gone and banks overgrown, today the Wilsons River slips past the Lismore CBD (central business district) almost un-noticed - except in times of flood.

At the beginning of the 20th century, river navigation was still the mainstay of transportation in Lismore, the principal operator being the North Coast Steam Navigation Company. The dairy industry was performing strongly, employing hundreds of small family-owned operations, the Lismore region becoming the centre for dairy production from the surrounding farms and the richest dairy district in Australia. The railway station had opened in 1894 as the starting point of the Murwillumbah railway line which, starting at that time in Lismore, ran to the coast at Byron Bay (from which steamers could be caught to Sydney) and then on to Murwillumbah, and subsequently in 1903 inland to Casino, but was not connected to any national network. However, as the century progressed, development of a better road network and the advance of motor transportation made inroads into the long-term success of both the river and rail traffic which eventually declined: river traffic was also affected by requisitioning of ships during the second world war and the largest shipping line operating on the two arms of the Richmond River, the North Coast Steam Navigation Company, went into liquidation in 1954; the railway line lasted until 2004 when it was closed on purely economic grounds after advising that it was "unprofitable" to continue providing services to Murwillumbah, putting an end to 110 years of rail transport in the region. Meanwhile, economic development in Lismore continued, including construction of a new School of Arts (1907, destroyed by fire in 1932), building of churches for four denominations, opening of a new Norco (dairy farmers' cooperative) factory in 1931, and other utilities.

=== Transport in Lismore ===
Lismore Airport had ceased commercial passenger operations after Rex Airlines discontinued its service between Sydney and Lismore, ending its longstanding operation with the final flight operating in June 2022. Air travel is now served by Ballina Byron Gateway Airport which is located approximately 34 kilometres (21 mi) east of Lismore.

Regular coach services towards Casino and Brisbane are run by Premier Motor Service, and NSW Trainlink. Ballina Buslines and Northern Rivers Buslines run regular cash only services towards Byron Bay, Kyogle, Ballina, Goonellebah, and Nimbin.

A 2013 government report found that 90% of trips in the Northern Rivers region were by car, with 1% by public transport. This was attributed to a small and distributed population.

=== City status ===
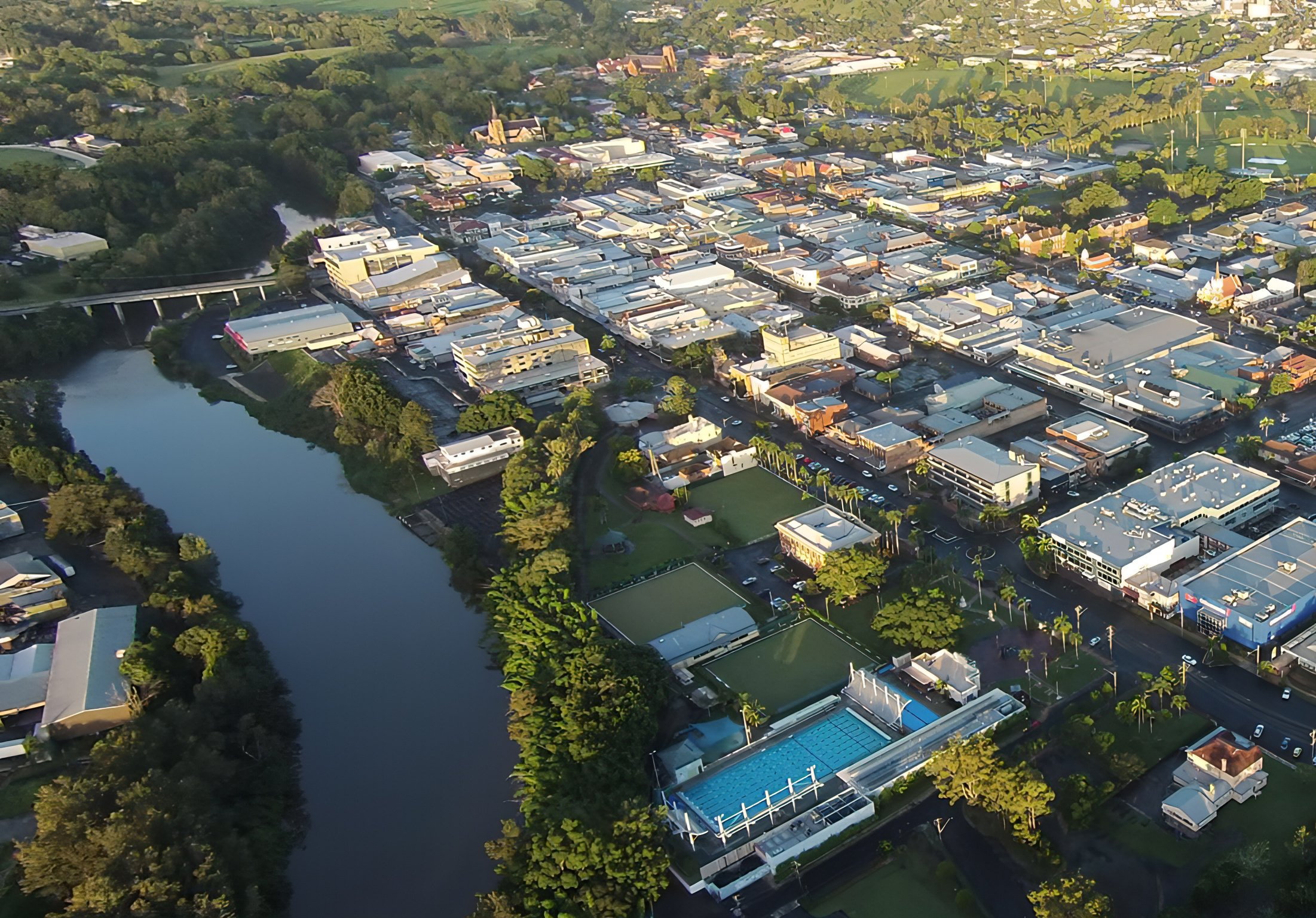
Lismore CBD and Wilsons River from above, photographed in 2015 (detail of image in infobox); recognisable features include Fawcett Bridge over the river, 2 churches at the top of frame (including St. Carthage's Cathedral at right), Molesworth Street, the original Municipal Chambers, and the Memorial Baths/Aquatic Centre. The former Post and Telegraph Office (indistinct) is located on Molesworth Street, a little above the centre of the frame.

Lismore was officially gazetted as a city on 9 September 1946, with grant of an official coat of arms on 29 January 1947. In the early 1950s, civic pride was boosted by a visit from the newly crowned Queen Elizabeth II with her consort who visited the city in February 1954, staying at the city's Gollan Hotel.

Television came to the city in 1956 and a local channel commenced broadcast in 1962 in the suburb of Goonellabah, which had been incorporated into the city of Lismore four years earlier. In 1969, the aerodrome at South Lismore received its licence from the Department of Civil Aviation, becoming the basis of the future Lismore Airport. The 1960s were something of a boom time in development for Lismore, although the dairy industry was starting to decline and by the end of that decade and into the 1970s, many farmers turned to raising beef cattle instead, or simply let their land condition lapse.

In 1963, a new bridge (the Ballina St. bridge) was opened to carry the Bruxner Highway road traffic across the Wilsons River; previously all traffic between the east and west banks of the river had to travel via the narrower, upstream Fawcett Bridge, originally constructed in 1894, before even motor traffic had come to the area.

Later, especially following the 1973 "alternative society" Aquarius Festival, which was held in the nearby village of Nimbin, the area began to attract so-called "alternative lifestylers" who were able to buy ex-dairying land at reasonable prices and re-invigorate the area with a range of pursuits and values of interest to a new generation, including an interest in owner-building of residences, experiments in communal living, environmental awareness and various artistic and creative activities, leading to badging of the area around Lismore as the "rainbow region". Meanwhile, Lismore has also become a regional centre for higher education: the original Lismore Teachers College (1970 onwards) becoming first the Northern Rivers College of Advanced Education in 1973, then an associate member of the University of New England, and finally (together with UNE-Coffs Harbour Centre), forming the Lismore Campus of the new Southern Cross University (established 1 January 1994). In addition, tourism has become an important contributor to the region's economy as well as the development of new agricultural products such as macadamias, avocado and stone fruit, pecans, and boutique coffee plantations, which are well suited to the rich volcanic soils, subtropical climate and moderately high rainfall of the area.

As traditional agricultural and manufacturing sectors have declined somewhat, so employment in the service sector has expanded. At the 2016 census, within Lismore City and the surrounding region (43,135 persons) the top employment sectors reported were Health Care and Social Assistance (4,534 persons), Retail Trade (2,491 persons), Education and Training (2,448 persons) and Accommodation and Food Services (1,297 persons), followed by Public Administration and Safety (1,204 persons), Agriculture, Forestry and Fishing (1,018 persons), Manufacturing (1,000 persons) and Construction (967 persons).

=== Architecture and amenities ===
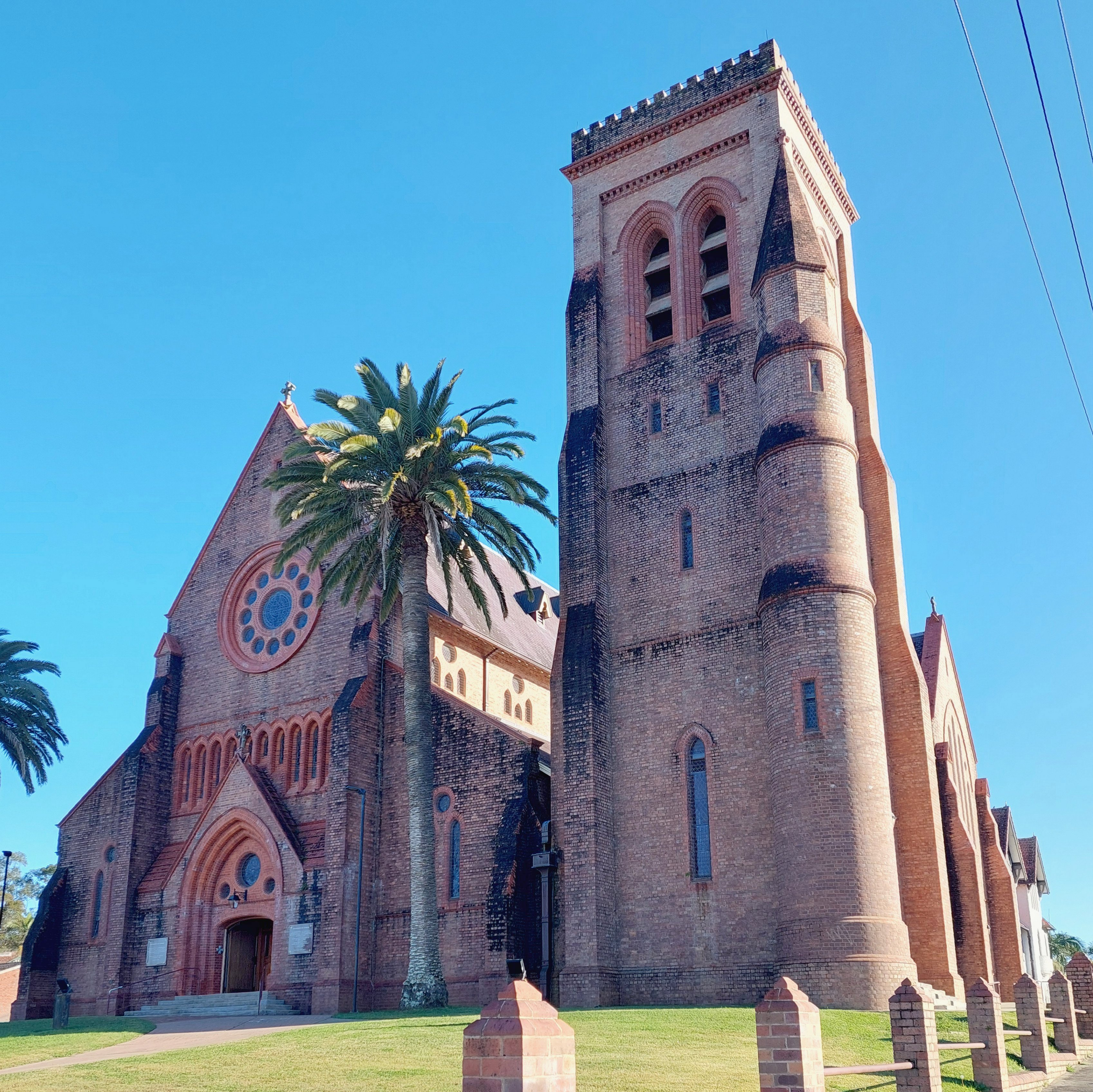
St. Carthage's Cathedral at Lismore, Australia

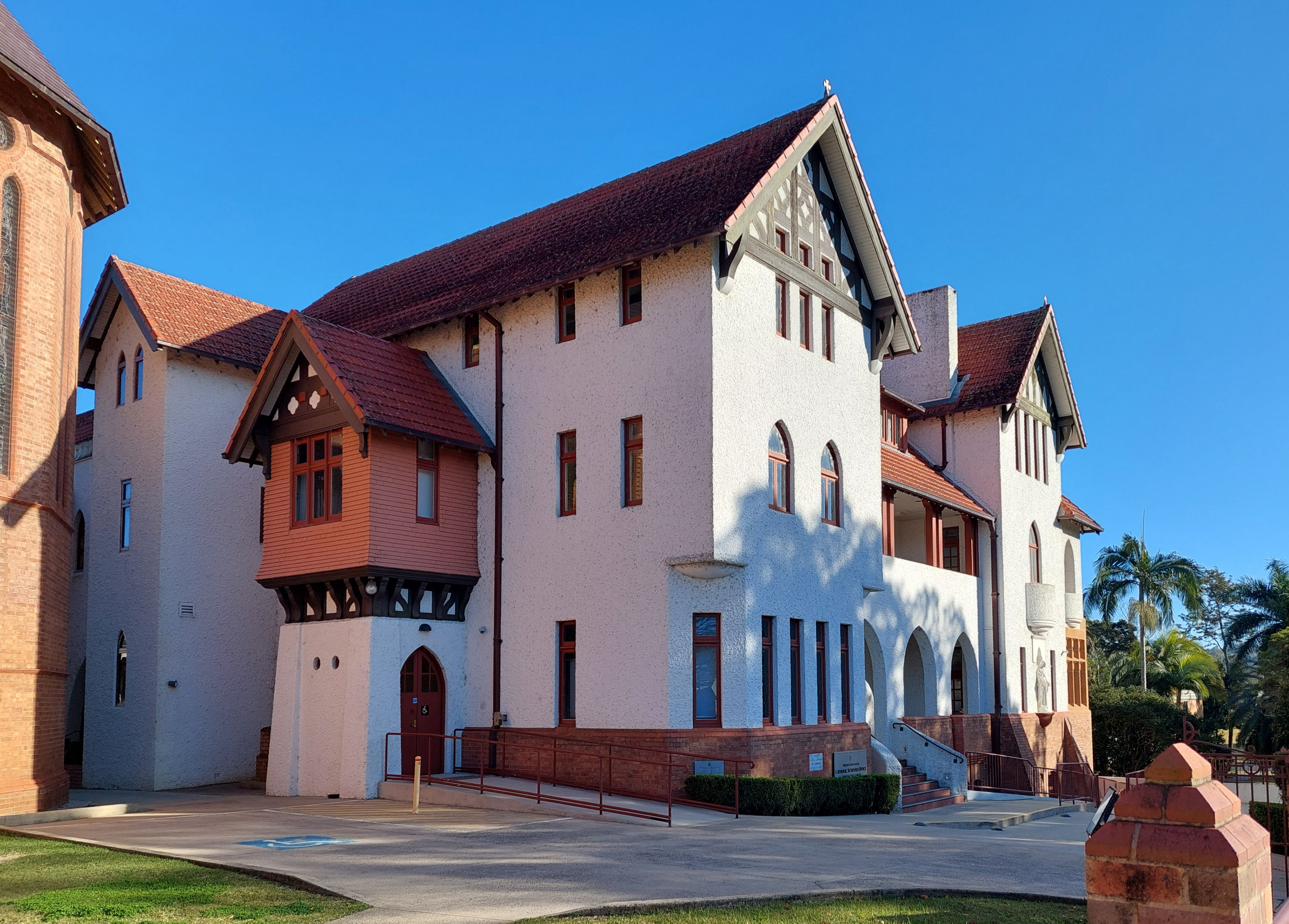
Presentation House (former St Mary's Convent), Dawson Street

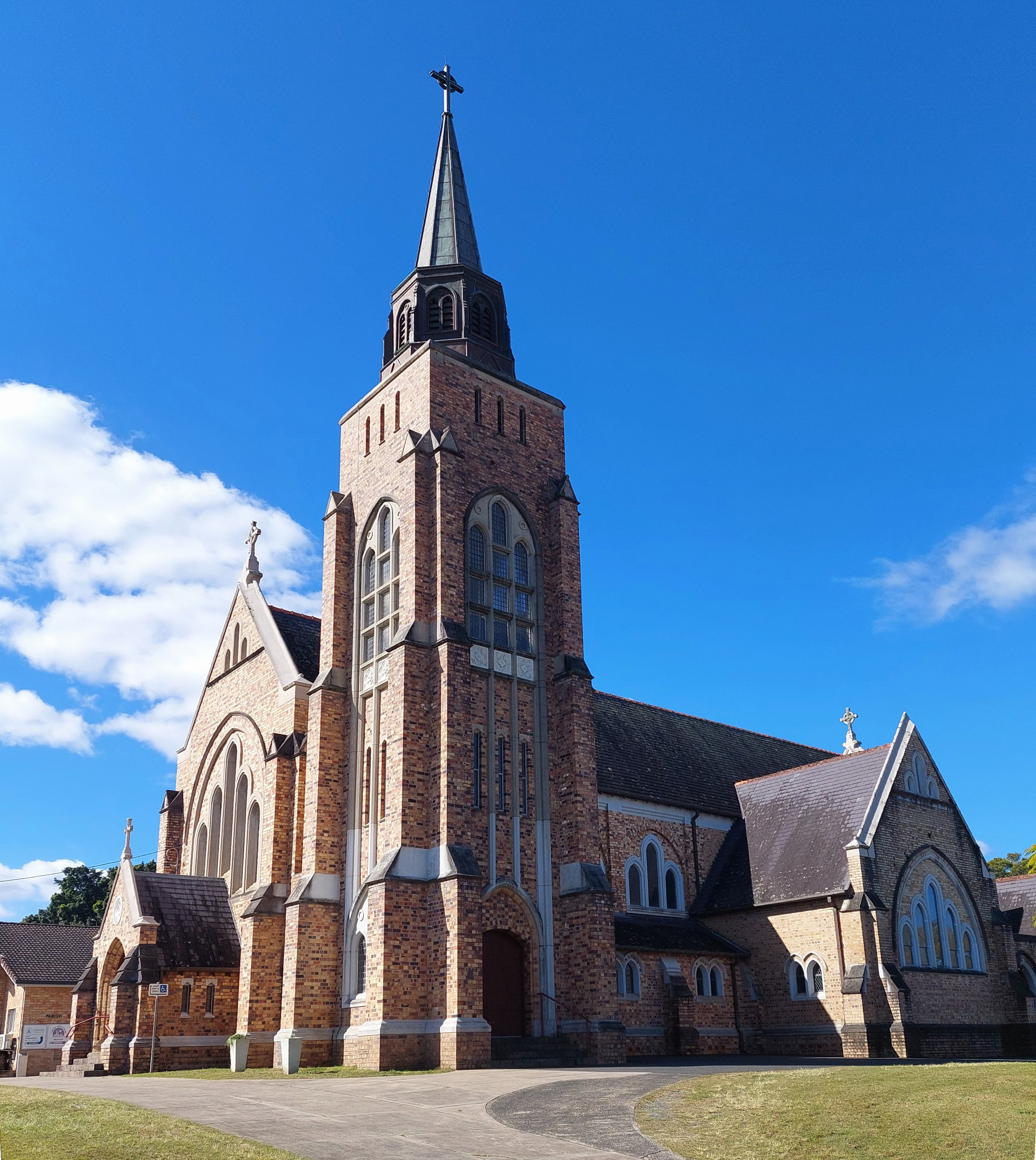
St. Andrew's Anglican Church, Zadoc Street

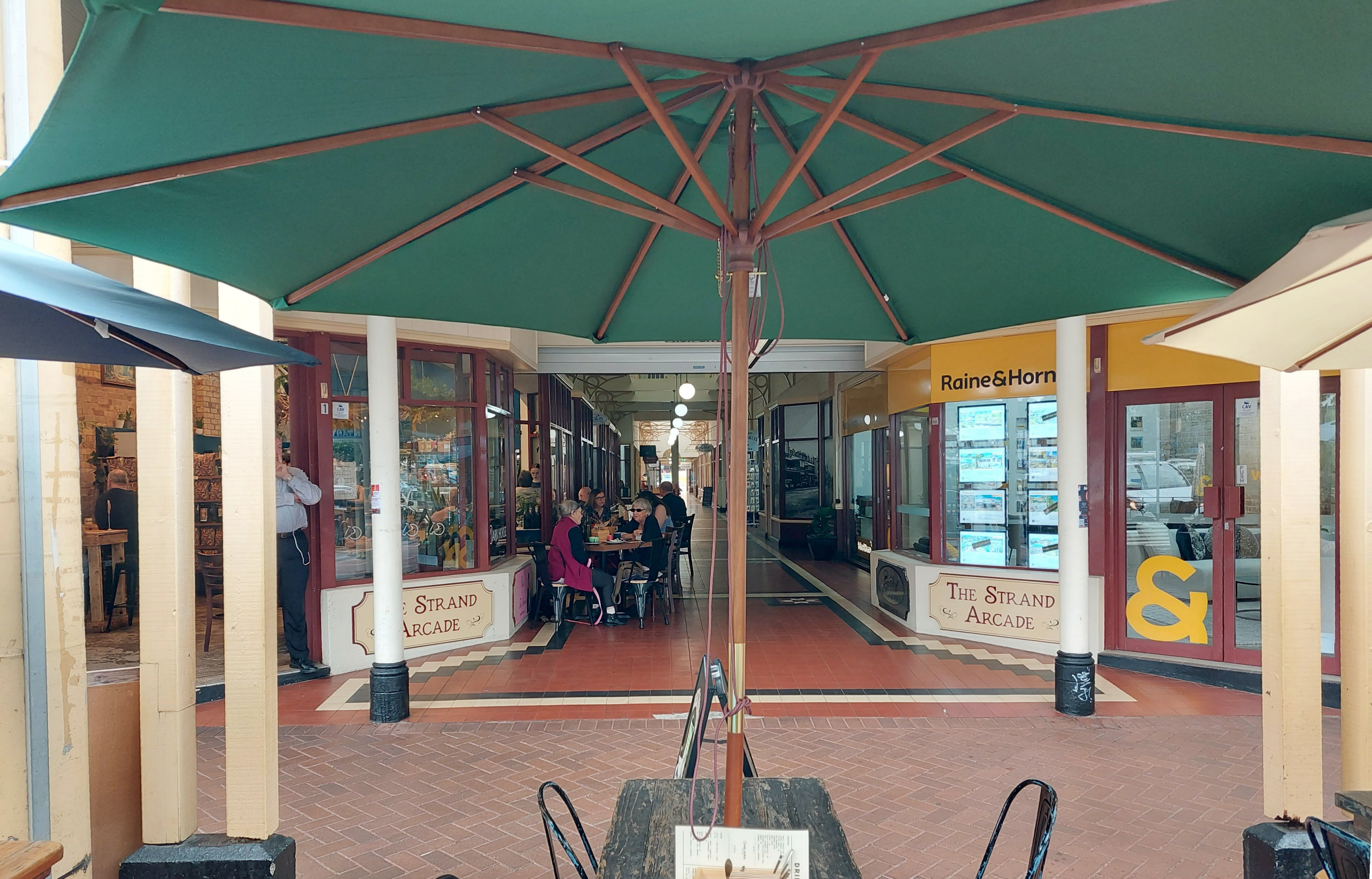
Lismore: entrance to the Strand Arcade (2023 photograph)

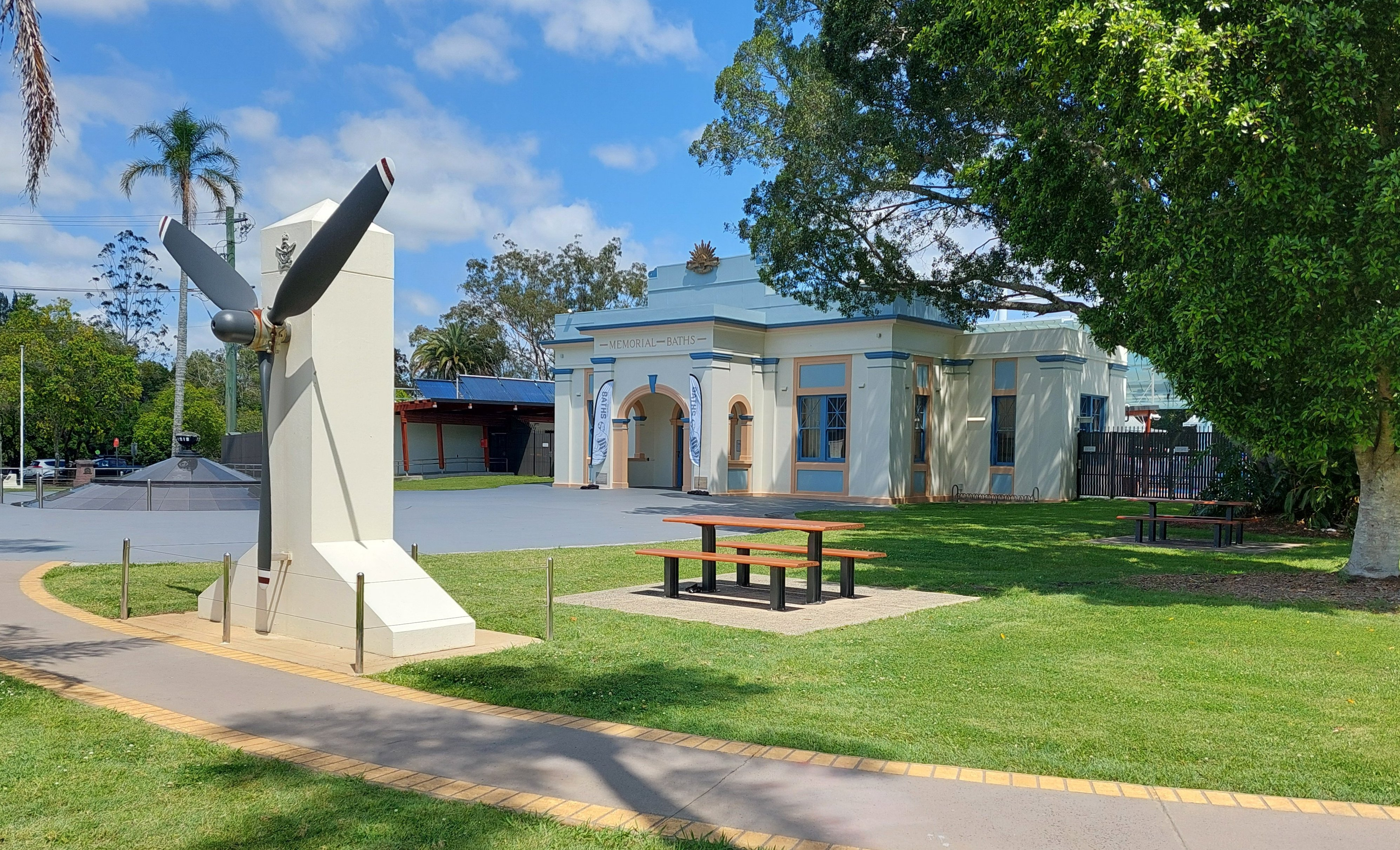
Lismore Memorial Baths, exterior, October 2024

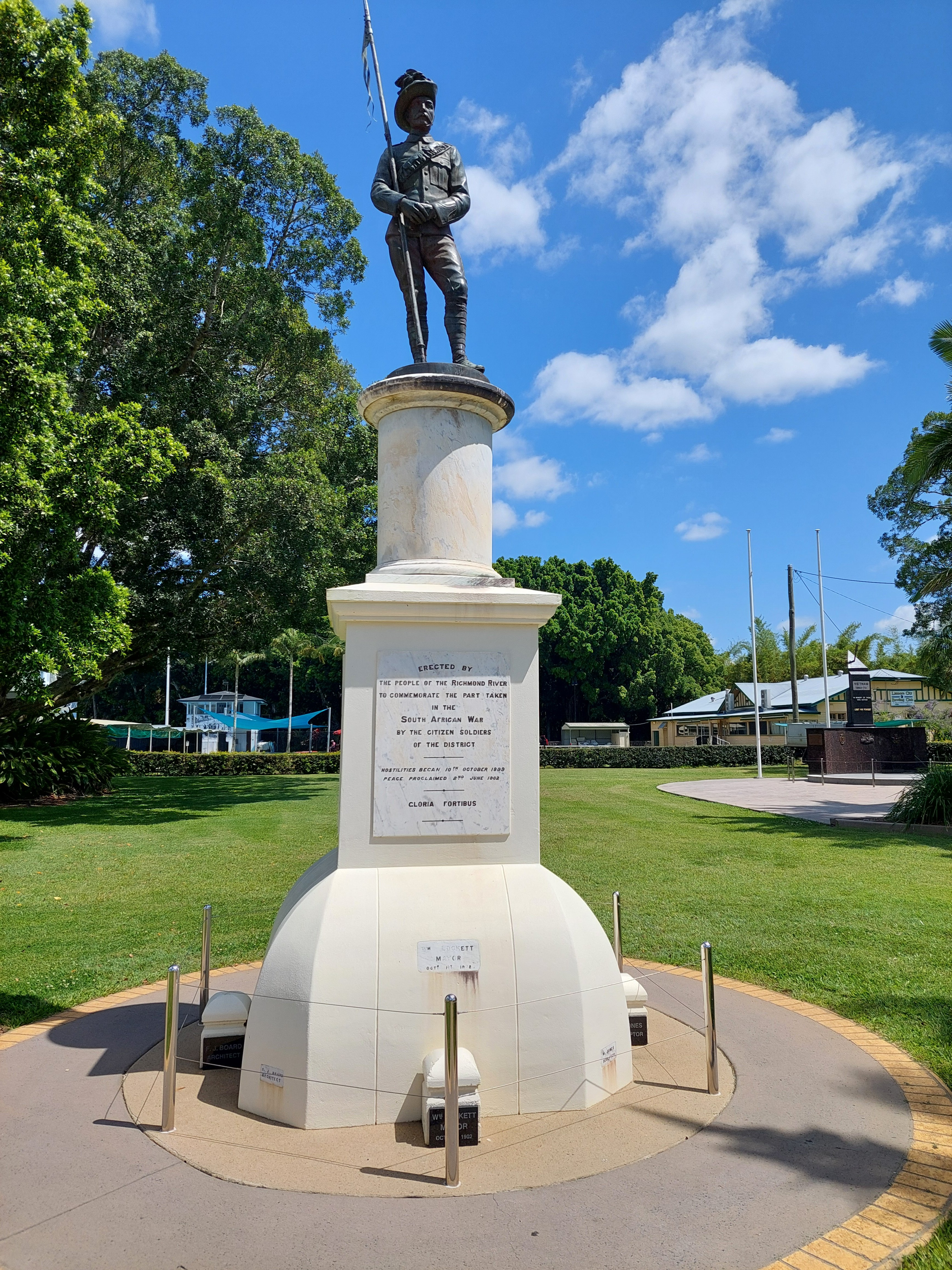
Boer War Memorial adjacent to Lismore Memorial Baths, October 2024

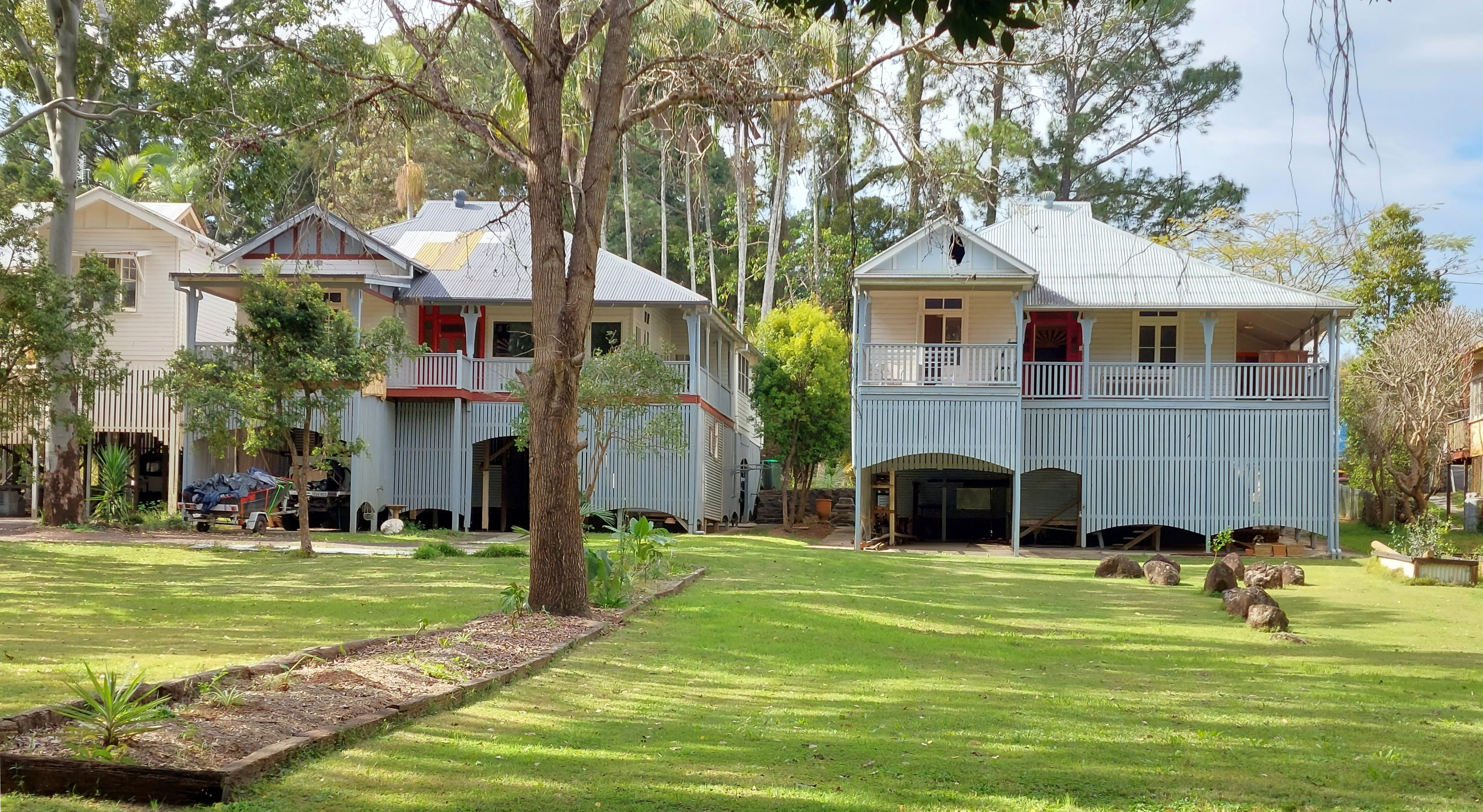
Older style, "high Set" wooden (weatherboard) houses near central Lismore, with living accommodation on the first floor and accessed via external stairs

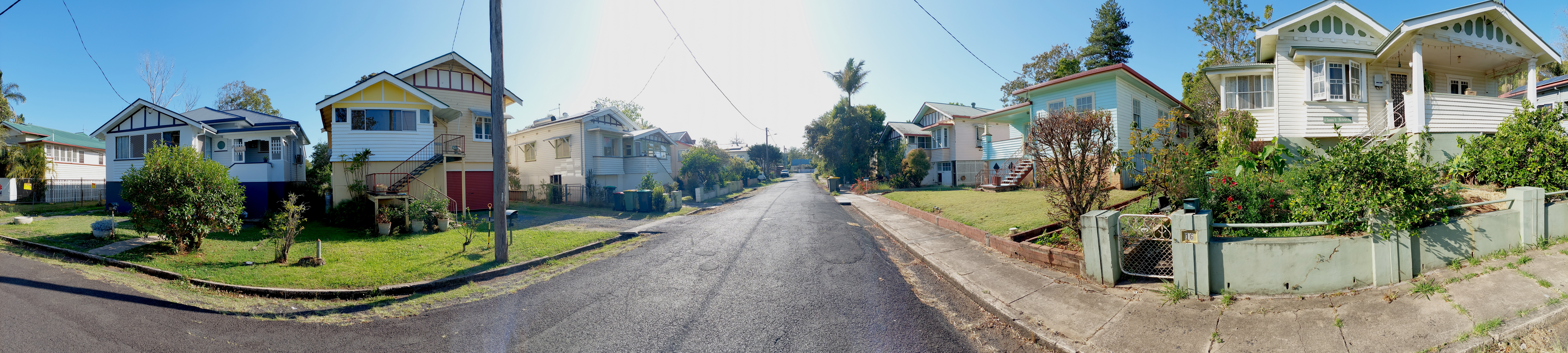
Suburban street in North Lismore, showing a preponderance of mid-20th century "high set" residences

Surviving buildings of historical interest within Lismore City include the old Council Chambers (1928) in Molesworth Street designed by William Gilroy, now home to the Richmond River Historical Society Museum with a collection of objects, documents and photographs relevant to the historical development of the area, including Aboriginal artifacts; the Art Nouveau post office (1897), designed by W.L. Vernon; the original Australian Joint Stock Bank (1891), built in the Italianate style, now the T & G Building; the classical revival courthouse (1883) in Zadoc Street; the Lismore Memorial Baths (1928), constructed as a memorial to local persons who died in World War I; and various churches including St Andrew's Anglican Church (1904), St Carthage's Roman Catholic Cathedral (1892–1907), the Uniting (formerly Methodist) Church (1908–09), the Church of Christ (1923), and St Paul's Presbyterian Church (1907–08). Adjacent to St. Carthage's Cathedral, Presentation House, a convent opened for the Roman Catholic Presentation Sisters in 1907 and used by the nuns until 2004, has been refurbished and now serves as the Catholic Schools Office for the Diocese of Lismore.

The commercial city centre retains many shopfronts ranging in date from the late nineteenth to mid twentieth centuries with little modern intrusion; a feature of interest is the presence of numerous arcades, for example the 1920s Star Court Arcade, which includes the 1921 Star Court Theatre, which allow shoppers to continue to shop in comfort in the presence of subtropical downpours as well as extremes of heat or cold.

Many homes in the city are built in the "high set" style otherwise common to much of Queensland (refer accompanying photographs) with living accommodation on the first floor leaving the ground floor unenclosed by structural walls and open to cooling breezes beneath the floorboards in the summer. With the advent of air conditioning in more recent years, such understories have frequently been walled in retrospectively and used for other purposes such as garages, play areas (rumpus rooms) or additional accommodation; in commercial areas they may also be adapted for shop fronts at street/pedestrian level. Most houses also feature covered verandahs wrapping around part or all of the house, to provide both shade from hot sun as needed, and an outdoor area protected from the elements for activities during wet weather.

The city encompasses a range of parks and gardens, some bordering the river, as well as Rotary Park, a patch of regenerated rainforest close to the centre of the city, and a 27 ha remnant of the "Big Scrub" in the form of the Wilson Nature Reserve (see below).

== Heritage and other listings ==
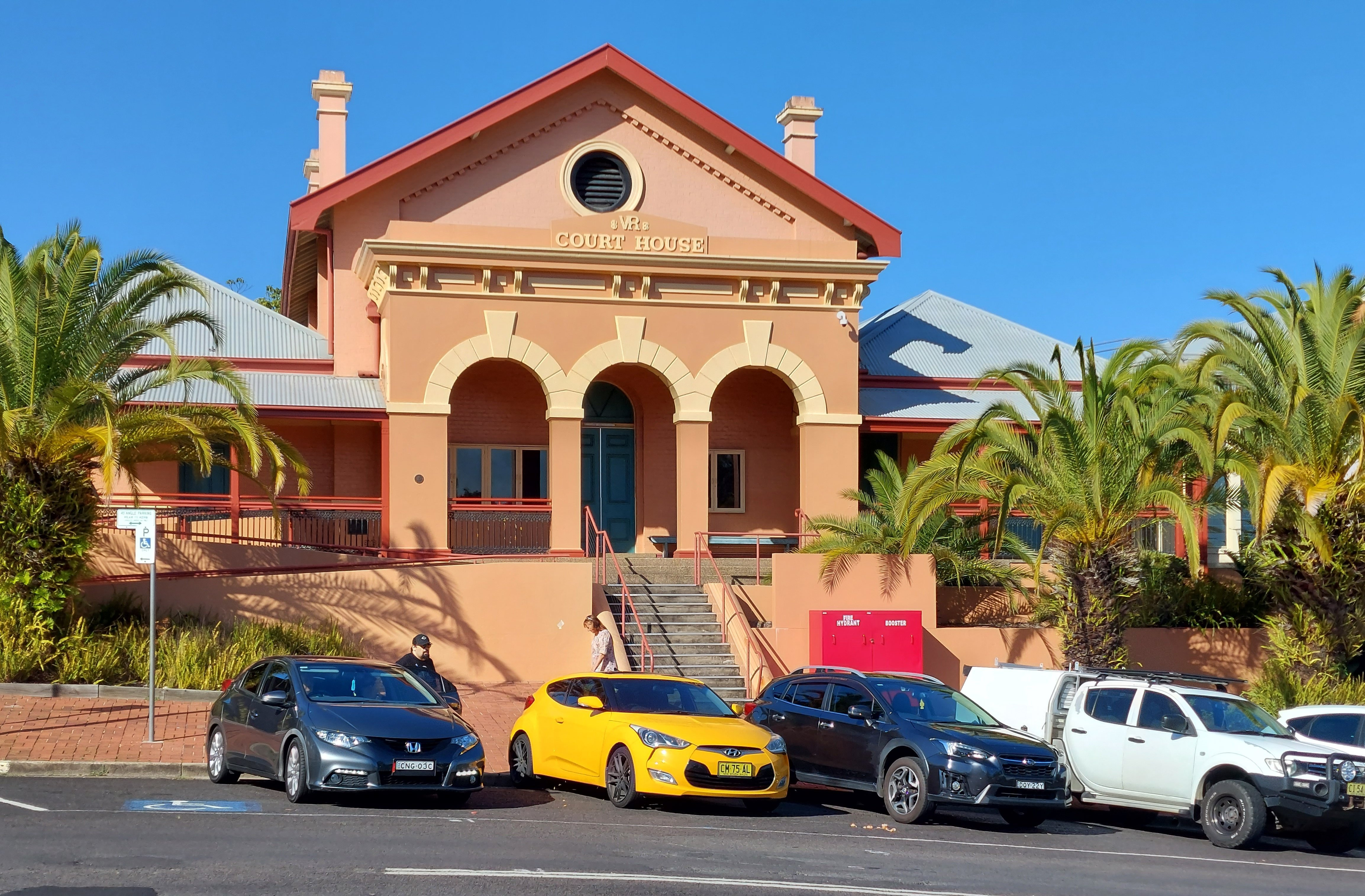
The 1883 Court House in Zadoc Street

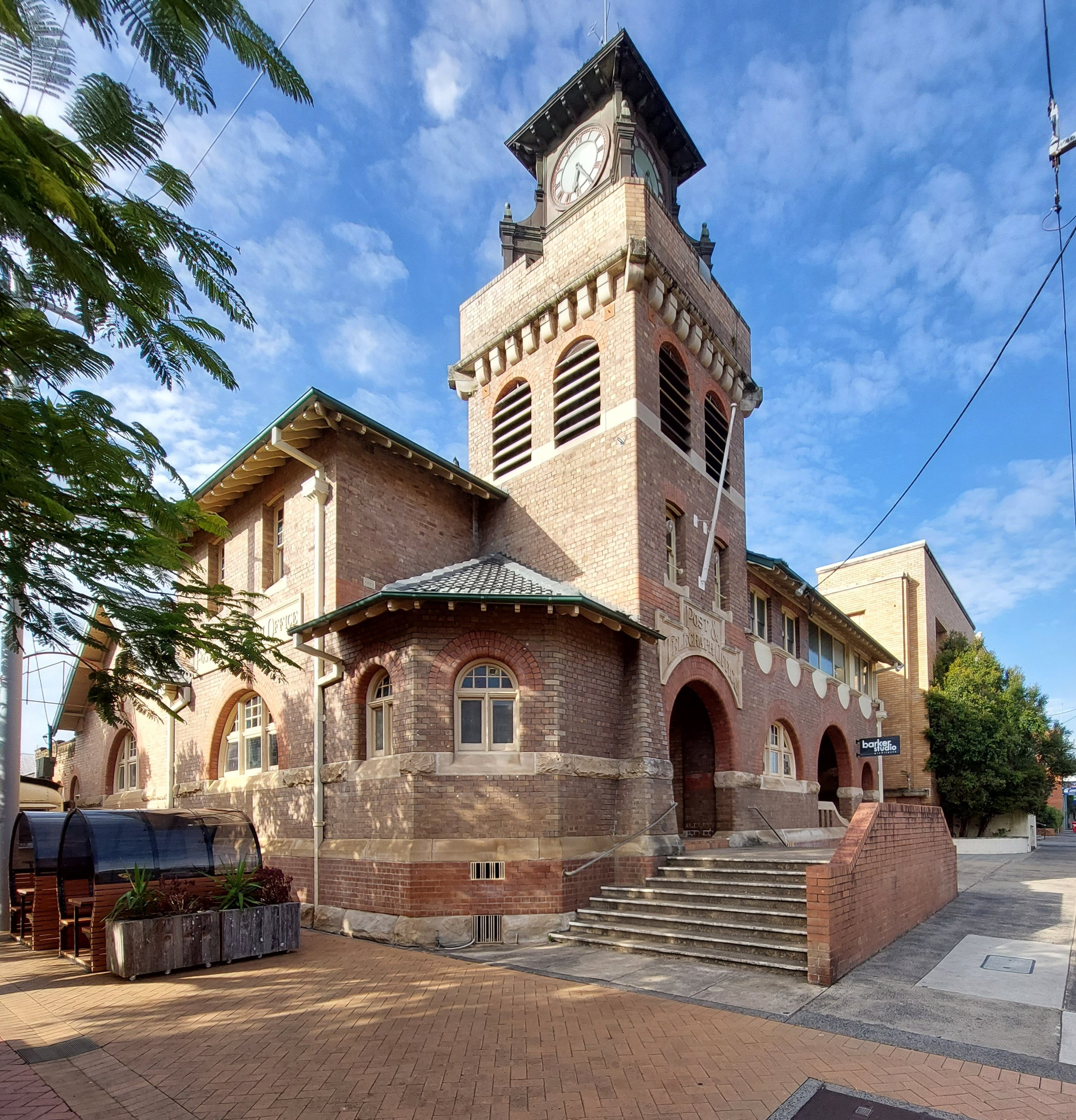
The 1898 Lismore Post and Telegraph Office building

Lismore has three sites listed on the New South Wales State Heritage Register (for images see "Gallery"), namely:

- Colemans Bridge over Leycester Creek.
- Lismore railway station.
- Lismore railway underbridges.

An additional c. 42 items are listed by the local council on Local Environmental Plans under the Environmental Planning and Assessment Act, 1979, including:

- The 1883 classical revival Court House, Zadoc Street.
- The Commonwealth Bank building, Molesworth Street.
- Dalley Street Conservation Area.
- The former Government Savings Bank, Woodlark Street.
- Lismore Fire Station, Molesworth Street.
- Memorial Baths, Molesworth Street.
- The 1898 Post and Telegraph Office building.

A full listing of heritage sites in Lismore can be generated via a search for suburb/town = "Lismore" via the New South Wales Heritage Database.

== Rainforest ==
Lismore and surrounding towns were once part of the rainforest referred to as the "Big Scrub", of which less than one percent remains following British settlement. A section of this rainforest is viewable in the grounds of the Southern Cross University and at Wilsons Nature Reserve on Wyrallah Road.

== Geography ==
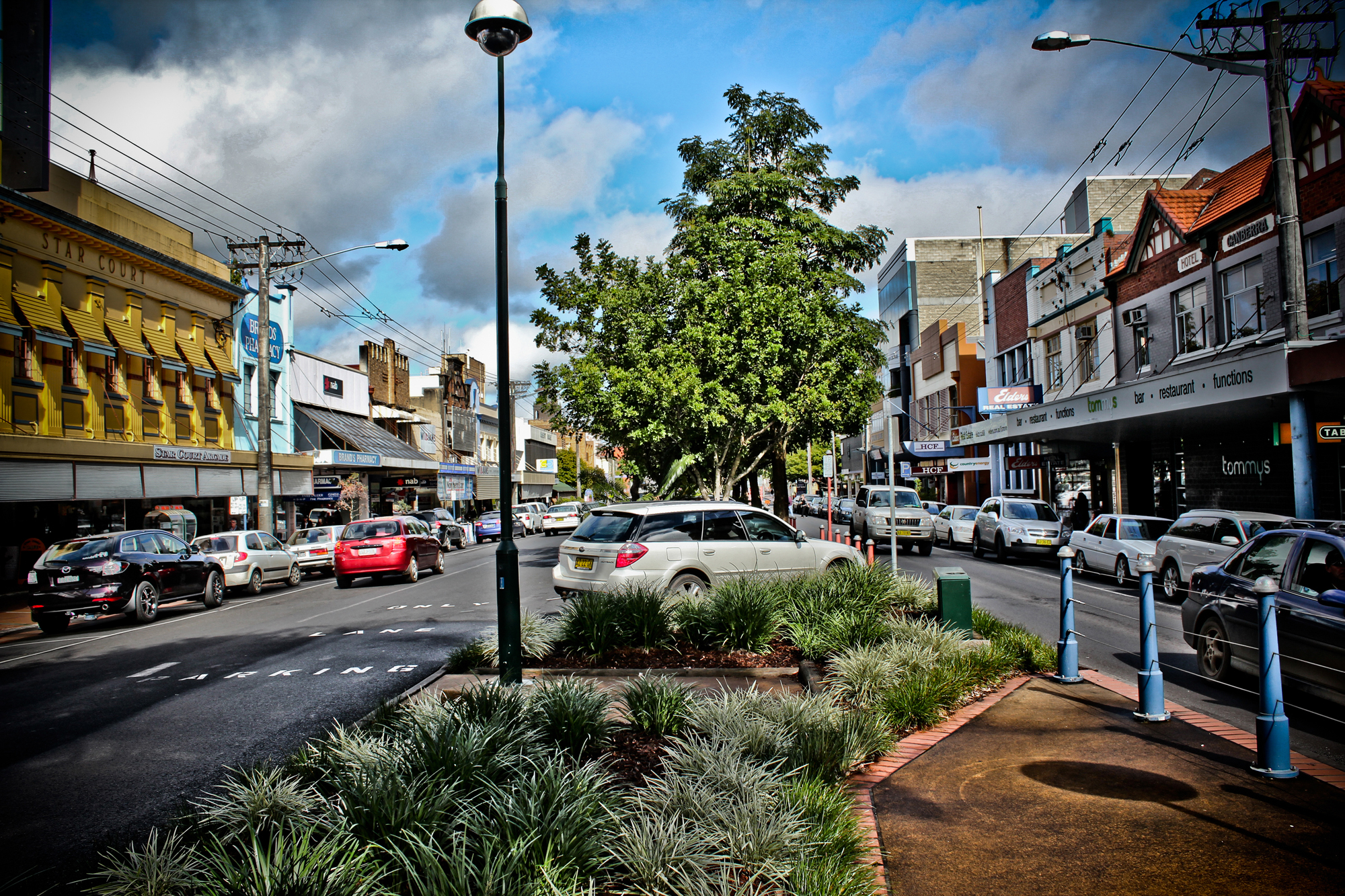
Molesworth Street, Lismore

Lismore is located on the Bruxner Highway and it lies at the confluence of the Wilsons River (a tributary of the Richmond River) and Leycester Creek, The state capital city of Sydney is located 764 km (475 mi) to the south by highway. Brisbane, the state capital of Queensland, is 200 kilometres (124 mi) to the north.

Lismore's central business district is located 35 kilometres (22 mi) from the eastern coast, and 46 kilometres (29 mi) southwest of Byron Bay. The coastal town of Ballina is 36 kilometres (22 mi) away. There are a number of rainforest patches in the area, remnants of the Big Scrub. These are preserved today, with a small pocket known as Boatharbour Reserve just east of town on the Bangalow road. The nearest large and publicly accessible national park is Nightcap National Park.

== Climate and weather ==
=== General characteristics ===
Lismore experiences a humid subtropical climate with mild to warm temperatures all year round and ample rainfall, with a long term yearly average of 1,343 mm. Temperatures in summer range between 20 °C (68 °F) and 35 °C (95 °F). The subtropical climate combined with geographical features means the urban area is unusually humid when compared with surrounding areas. Humidity levels often reach 100% in summer. Lismore has 109.6 clear days annually.

=== Floods ===
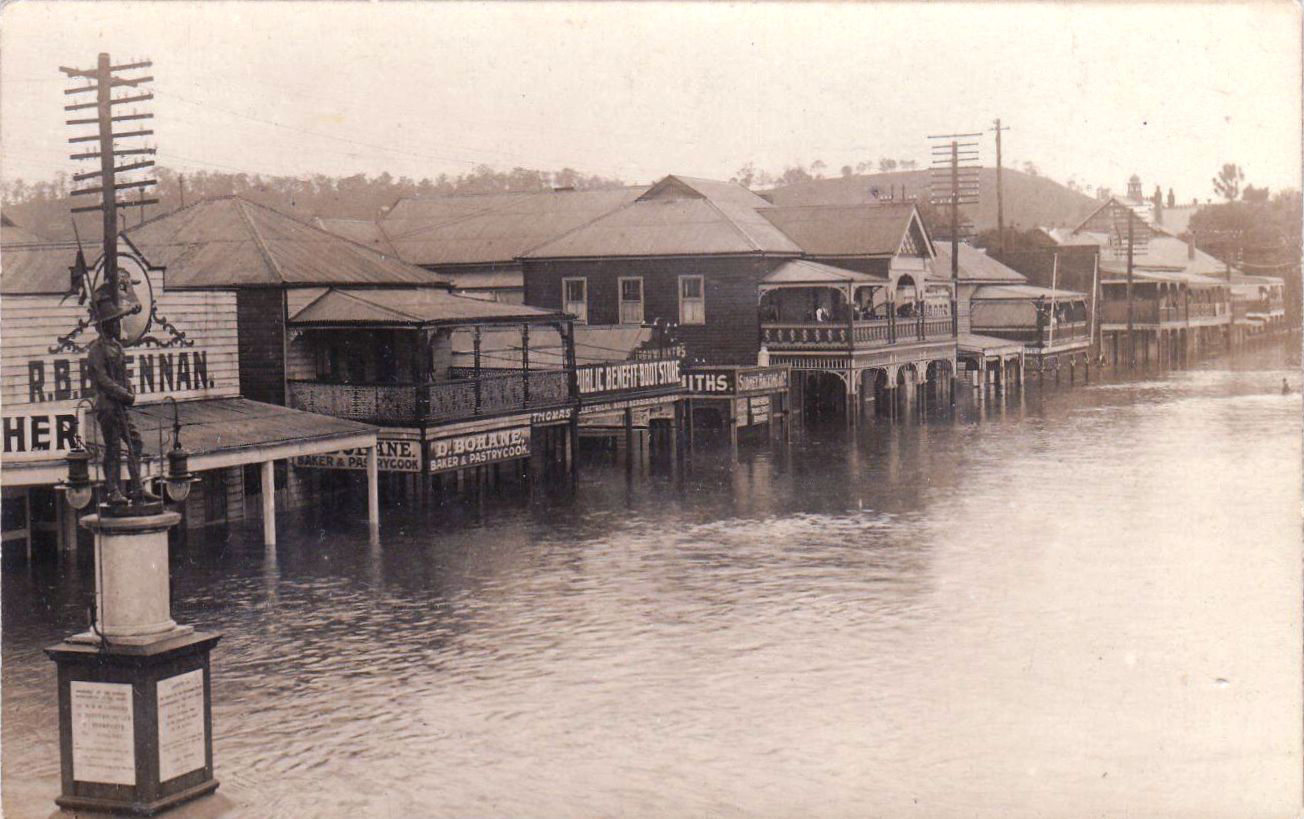
Flood at Lismore, NSW, 23 July 1921 (contemporary postcard)

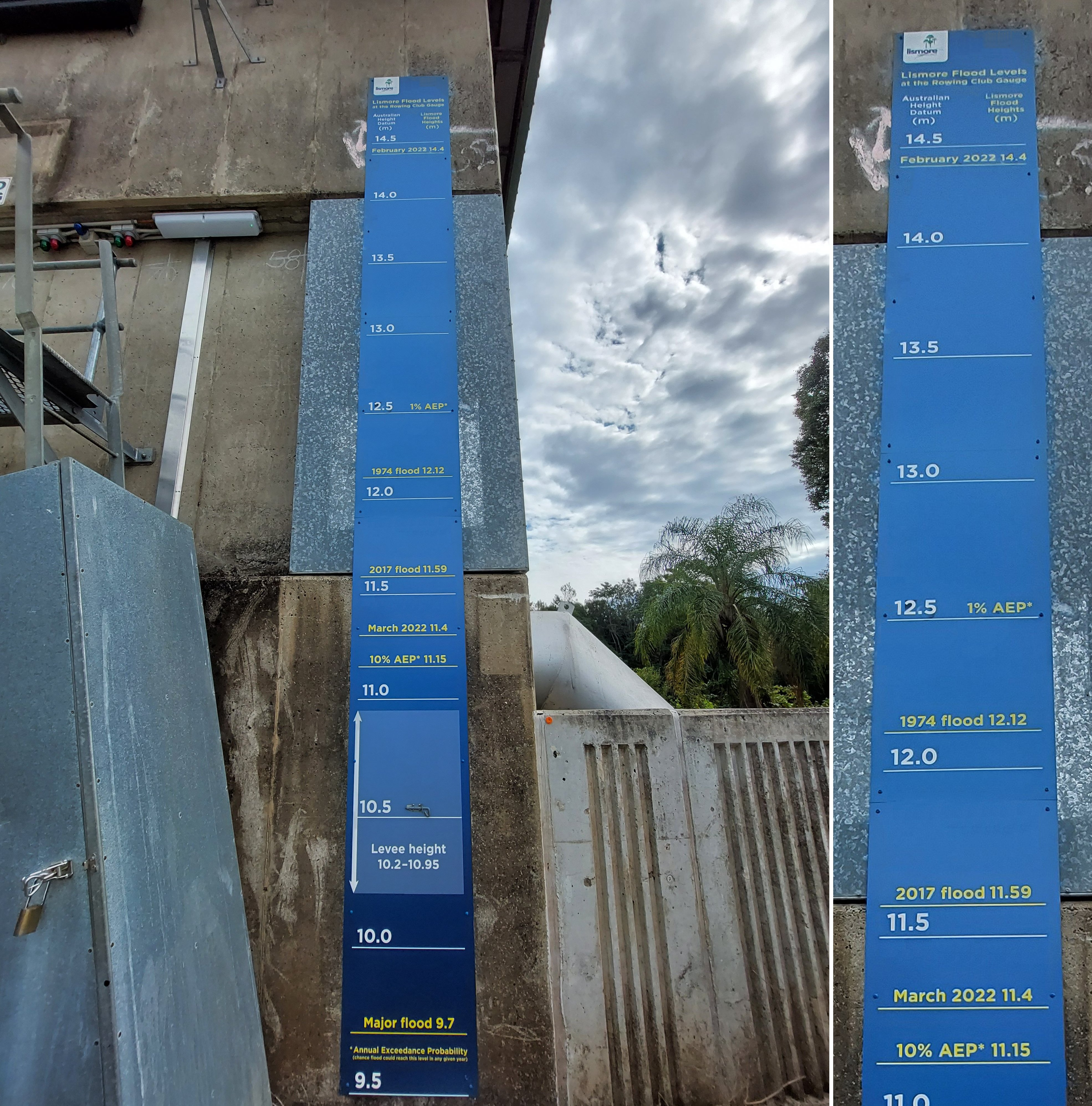
Display of flood levels (to 2022) of Wilsons River at Lismore, NSW

Although no other major environmental hazards generally affect the area, Lismore is renowned for frequent floods from Wilsons River and Leycester Creek. Prior to the 2022 event which reached an unprecedented 14.4 metres (47 ft), the worst such floods were in 1954 and 1974, when waters rose to a height of 12.1 metres (40 ft), with a number of others recorded as exceeding the stated height of the levee wall protection at 10.7 metres (35 ft). A history of Lismore flood events from 1870 to 2022 has been published by Lismore council.

In 1999 a government-funded scheme to protect the CBD and South Lismore from a 1-in-10-year flood event was approved. This proposal would mean that most of the smaller floods would not enter the central area of Lismore and substantially improve the time available for the evacuation of residents and the business community in larger floods. Nonetheless, around 3000 residents of Lismore were evacuated after floods affected much of the area on 30 June 2005, many being temporarily housed on the campus of Southern Cross University. However, the new levee that had been completed two weeks prior limited damage and stopped the water reaching the Central Business District.

In the aftermath of Cyclone Debbie in March 2017, Lismore was again badly affected by flooding of up to 3.5 metres (11 ft) through all CBD businesses. Wilsons River reached 11.6 metres (38 ft) and the levee was overtopped for the first time since its completion. A modelled projection of the maximum flood extent, plus an animation, of this flood event as affecting Lismore is available on the "BigData Earth" Company website.

A budget of $8.2 million for additional flood mitigation works was announced in November 2018.

In February 2022, Lismore and other parts of Northern New South Wales and South East Queensland were flooded to an unprecedented degree, resulting in serious devastation to many buildings in the CBD in addition to adjacent low lying residential areas which will take "years to rebuild". The Wilsons River in Lismore reached 14.37 metres at its peak, the largest flood since modern records began. One year on from the disaster, the process of reconstruction was still ongoing.

=== Cyclones ===
At a latitude approaching 29°S, Lismore is out of range for most Australian region tropical cyclones which typically inhabit the region north of 25°S, however exceptions to this general pattern have occurred, notably Cyclone Zoe which directly affected the region in March 1974, and heavy rainfall in March 2017 associated with ex-Cyclone Debbie which had crossed the coast near Airlie Beach in Queensland, over 1,200 km to the north, but then travelled south as a Tropical Low before passing over populous areas of South East Queensland and the Northern Rivers and then moving out to sea once more. Earlier, before the start of the current official naming method for tropical cyclones in Australia, Lismore was affected by "The Great Gold Coast Cyclone" (informal title) which crossed the coast at Coolangatta on the Gold Coast south of Brisbane, in February 1954.

To a lesser degree, Lismore was also affected by rain events associated with Tropical Cyclone Beatrice in January 1959, Tropical Cyclone Elaine in March 1967, Tropical Cyclones Daisy and Wendy in February 1972, Tropical Cyclone Emily in April the same year, Tropical Cyclone Wanda in January 1974, Tropical Cyclone Colin in February 1976, Ex-Tropical Cyclone Lance in April 1984, Ex-Tropical Cyclone Elsie in March 1987, Tropical Cyclone Nancy in February 1990, and Ex-Tropical Cyclone Oswald in January 2013 followed by an unnamed, cyclone strength Low in February the same year.

In March 2025, Cyclone Alfred was expected to be the first tropical Cyclone to directly threaten Brisbane for 50 years, with associated high winds and rainfall anticipated to affect the Northern Rivers region (including Lismore) from around 7 March. In the event, Cyclone Alfred's main effects were felt further north than Lismore, although the city did experience high rainfall which caused road closures plus power outages to thousands of customers across northern New South Wales, as well as moderate flooding in the Lismore central business district with the Wilsons River rising to 9.31 meters, just below the major flood level, before subsiding.

=== Drought and water security ===
A high degree of year-to-year variation in rainfall is typical of the Northern Rivers region. Periods of reduced rainfall are often associated with El Niño events and increased rainfall with La Niña events. For example, the region experienced a significant reduction in rainfall between late 2002 and mid-2003 and again in 2007 in association with persistent and recurrent El Niño events. In common with other areas in Australia, the Lismore region can experience drought but in general, the Northern Rivers region is less drought prone than many of its neighbours, especially those west of the Great Dividing Range.

The municipal water supply is provided by Rous County Council via Rocky Creek Dam, which is situated in a high rainfall area within the Whian Whian State Conservation Area approximately 20 kilometres (12 mi) north of the city, and can be supplemented by drawing additional water from the Wilsons River when required. According to data in the Drought Management Plan adopted by the Council in 2016, level 1 water restrictions for the whole supply region (which stretches from Woodburn in the south to Ocean Shores in the north, as well as westwards to Lismore) would be triggered if the level in Rocky Creek Dram falls to 60%, level 2 restrictions at 45% of capacity, and so on. From 2002 up to late 2019, only one period of severe water restrictions was recorded (reaching level 5 in March 2003) with one other period of lesser severity (level 1 restrictions) during the second half of 2007.

=== Other severe weather events ===
Lismore is often hit by severe storms in spring and summer. For example, there was a severe hailstorm on 9 October 2007. A tornado is an extreme rarity, but later that same month one struck nearby Dunoon. It was captured on video as it hit an electrical transformer station there.

=== Quantifying natural hazard risks ===
In a 2016 report prepared for Insurance Australia Group (IAG), the consulting company SGS Economics and Planning rated and mapped different Local Government Areas (LGAs) across Australia against a range of natural hazard risks, namely Tropical Cyclone, Storm, Bushfire, Earthquake and Flood. On a 0-5 scale where 0 = no exposure, 5 = extreme risk, the region which includes Lismore rated 1 for Earthquake, 2 for Storm and Bushfire, 3 for Tropical Cyclone and 4 for Flood risk (SGS report, Figures 1, 3, 5, 6, 8).

Climate data for Lismore
Month	Jan	Feb	Mar	Apr	May	Jun	Jul	Aug	Sep	Oct	Nov	Dec	Year
Record high °C (°F)	43.4 (110.1)	42.8 (109.0)	37.2 (99.0)	35.6 (96.1)	30.6 (87.1)	28.1 (82.6)	28.9 (84.0)	32.7 (90.9)	37.2 (99.0)	39.8 (103.6)	42.2 (108.0)	40.6 (105.1)	43.4 (110.1)
Mean daily maximum °C (°F)	29.9 (85.8)	29.1 (84.4)	27.9 (82.2)	25.7 (78.3)	22.6 (72.7)	20.2 (68.4)	19.9 (67.8)	21.5 (70.7)	24.4 (75.9)	26.6 (79.9)	28.2 (82.8)	29.7 (85.5)	25.5 (77.9)
Mean daily minimum °C (°F)	18.8 (65.8)	18.8 (65.8)	17.4 (63.3)	14.2 (57.6)	10.9 (51.6)	8.5 (47.3)	6.5 (43.7)	7.2 (45.0)	9.9 (49.8)	13.2 (55.8)	15.8 (60.4)	17.8 (64.0)	13.2 (55.8)
Record low °C (°F)	11.6 (52.9)	11.8 (53.2)	10.0 (50.0)	5.0 (41.0)	1.1 (34.0)	−1.0 (30.2)	−3.5 (25.7)	−2.0 (28.4)	−0.3 (31.5)	2.8 (37.0)	6.1 (43.0)	7.8 (46.0)	−3.5 (25.7)
Average rainfall mm (inches)	155.4 (6.12)	183.6 (7.23)	188.4 (7.42)	129.2 (5.09)	115.3 (4.54)	97.0 (3.82)	80.3 (3.16)	54.9 (2.16)	50.4 (1.98)	73.2 (2.88)	94.1 (3.70)	121.3 (4.78)	1,343.1 (52.88)
Average rainy days (≥ 0.2mm)	12.9	13.9	15.6	12.5	11.6	9.5	8.3	7.5	7.4	9.0	10.0	11.4	129.6
Average afternoon relative humidity (%)	58	61	60	58	59	56	51	46	45	50	51	55	54
Source 1: Bureau of Meteorology
Source 2: For February record high: Weatherzone

== Demographics ==
At the 2021 census, there were 28,816 people in built-up Lismore.

- Aboriginal and Torres Strait Islander people made up 7.1% of the population.
- 83.5% of people were born in Australia. The most common other countries of birth were England 2.1%, New Zealand 1.1%, Philippines 0.6%, India 0.5% and Germany 0.4%.
- 87.7% of people only spoke English at home. Other languages spoken at home included Italian at 0.5%.
- The most common responses for religion were No Religion 41.8%, Catholic 19.4% and Anglican 11.8%.

The population reached a recent peak of 29,320 at June 2012 and since has experienced a gradual decline to 28,816 in 2021. The population of central Lismore in 2021 was 3,656.

Historical population
Year	Pop.	±%
1921	8,700	—
1933	11,762	+35.2%
1947	15,214	+29.3%
1954	17,372	+14.2%
1961	18,935	+9.0%
1966	19,757	+4.3%
1971	20,904	+5.8%
1976	22,082	+5.6%
1981	24,033	+8.8%
1986	24,896	+3.6%
1991	27,246	+9.4%
1996	28,380	+4.2%
2001	27,193	−4.2%
2006	27,069	−0.5%
2011	27,474	+1.5%
2016	27,569	+0.3%
2021	27,916	+1.3%
Source: Australian Bureau of Statistics data.

== Media ==
The Northern Star is an online tabloid newspaper based in Lismore. It covers the region from Lismore, Casino, Ballina, Byron Bay, Murwillumbah, and Tweed Heads, and, like many other regional Australian newspapers owned by NewsCorp, the newspaper ceased print editions in June 2020 and became an online-only publication.

The Northern Rivers Echo was a free weekly community newspaper for Lismore, Alstonville, Wollongbar, Ballina, Casino, Nimbin and Evans Head. The Lismore CBD Magazine is a monthly e-magazine publication.

The commercial radio stations of Lismore are Triple Z (Hit Music) and 2LM 900 AM (also broadcast on 104.3FM) and both are run by Broadcast Operations Group. The community radio stations are River FM 92.9 which offers an independent alternative media voice playing a diverse range of music and ABC North Coast 94.5 FM.

Lismore receives TV channels from SBS and ABC and the regional owned and operated stations of Seven, Nine (Now owned by WIN Corporation) and 10 Northern NSW.

== Business ==
The Norco Co-operative has its headquarters in Lismore. The main campus of Southern Cross University is in Lismore.

== Education ==
- Southern Cross University has its home campus located in Lismore, offering undergraduate and postgraduate degrees in disciplines including business and law, tourism, humanities and social sciences, creative and performing arts, education, environment, marine and forest sciences, engineering, health and human sciences, law and Indigenous studies. The university was established in 1994 and has campuses at Coffs Harbour, New South Wales, and Gold Coast, Queensland. The university has students from more than 80 countries around the world.

Lismore and the surrounding area is home to a number of public and private schools, including:

- Albert Park Public School
- Blue Hills College
- Kadina High Campus
- Lismore High Campus
- Lismore Public School
- Lismore South Public School
- Living School Lismore
- Our Lady Help of Christians Catholic Primary School
- Richmond River High Campus
- St Carthage's Catholic Primary School
- St John's College, Woodlawn
- Summerland Christian College
- Trinity Catholic College, Lismore
- Vistara Primary School

== Sport and recreation ==
Lismore has two rugby league clubs competing in the Northern Rivers Regional Rugby League Competition:

- Lismore Marist Brothers Rams
- Northern United Dirrawongs

Lismore Marist Brothers Rams won the prestigious Clayton Cup in 1987, as the premier local rugby league team in Country New South Wales Competitions with a 17–1 record across the season.

Lismore is a strong-hold of association football, with six clubs affiliated with Football Far North Coast being located in Lismore and near surrounds:

- South Lismore Celtic – formed in 1946
- Lismore Workers – formed as Eastwood in 1949
- Lismore Thistles – formed in 1958
- Richmond Rovers – formed in 1961
- Italo Stars – formed in 1966, Defunct in 2023
- Goonellabah – formed in June 1969

The Albert Park complex is home to the Far North Coast Baseball Association and Lismore is considered one of the strongest centres for Baseball in Australia.

The Lismore Swans founded in 1983 represent Lismore in Australian rules football and competes in the AFL North Coast competition.

Lismore Speedway is a Speedway located at the Lismore Showgrounds. The track regularly hosts National and State titles and featured national events.

== Sister cities ==
Lismore formed a sister city relationship with the Japanese city of Yamatotakada in Nara Prefecture in 1963. The first such relationship established between Australia and Japan, it was initiated by Lismore-born Marist priest and writer Paul Glynn. Lismore is also a sister city of Eau Claire, Wisconsin, USA and Lismore, County Waterford, Ireland.

== Leaders ==
- Member of NSW State Parliament for Lismore: Janelle Saffin MP (Labor)
- Mayor of the City of Lismore: Steve Krieg (Independent)
- Deputy Mayor of the City of Lismore, Jeri Hall (Independent)

== Notable people ==
Notable people from or who have lived in Lismore include:

- Peter Arnison AC, CVO – Major General, Land Commander Australia 1994–1996, Governor of Queensland 1997–2003
- Julian Assange – WikiLeaks founder, once lived in Lismore
- Andrew Barr – the 7th Chief Minister of the Australian Capital Territory, was born in Lismore in 1973
- Lisa Casagrande – a footballer who played 64 internationals for the Matildas from 1994 to 2000.
- Ron Casey – Sydney based radio and television personality
- Con Colleano – a tightrope walker, was born in Lismore in 1899
- Harold Warnock Cottee – a co-founder of Cottee's drinks
- Bob Ellis – a writer, journalist, filmmaker and political commentator, was born in Lismore in 1942
- Craig Foster – former Socceroo, human rights advocate, was born in Lismore in 1969
- Paul Foster was born in Lismore in 1967.
- Peter Gahan – an Australian baseball player and the only FNCBA player to have their Australian player number retired.
- Adam Gilchrist – a cricketer, lived in Lismore from the age of 13
- Paul Glynn – a Marist missionary priest and writer, was born in Lismore in 1928
- Terry Greedy – a Socceroo goalkeeper was born in Lismore
- Grinspoon – a rock band, originated in Lismore
- Nicholas Hamilton – an actor mostly known for his role as Henry Bowers in It
- Lurline Hook – gold medalist diver at the 1938 British Empire Games
- Martin Kennedy – rugby league player
- Brian Kelly – rugby league player
- Alofiana Khan-Pereira – rugby league player
- Andrew King – rugby league player
- Chris King – rugby league player
- Noah Martin – rugby league player
- John McIntosh – Australian politician, member of the New South Wales Legislative Council
- David Mead – a National Rugby League player
- Adrian Meagher – an Olympic baseball player
- Bruce Mitchell – an Oxford scholar of Old English, was born in Lismore in 1920
- Maia Mitchell – an actress best known for her role as Callie Adams Foster on The Fosters and Good Trouble
- Pat Morton – a businessman and politician who was born and attended school in Lismore
- Margaret Olley AC – an Australian artist, was born in Lismore
- Jamilla Rankin – professional soccer player, was born in Lismore in 2003
- Rhoda Roberts – theatre director, actress and Aboriginal elder
- Nigel Roy – rugby league footballer, was born in Lismore in 1974
- Tony Smith – a rugby league coach
- James Strong AO – a former CEO of Qantas
- Emma Tom – a writer, journalist and media commentator
- Edwin Wilson – poet and painter, born Lismore 1942

== See also ==
- Cubawee, an historic self-managed Aboriginal reserve near Tuncester, near Lismore
- Lismore Turf Club

== Gallery ==
View over Lismore, October 2026

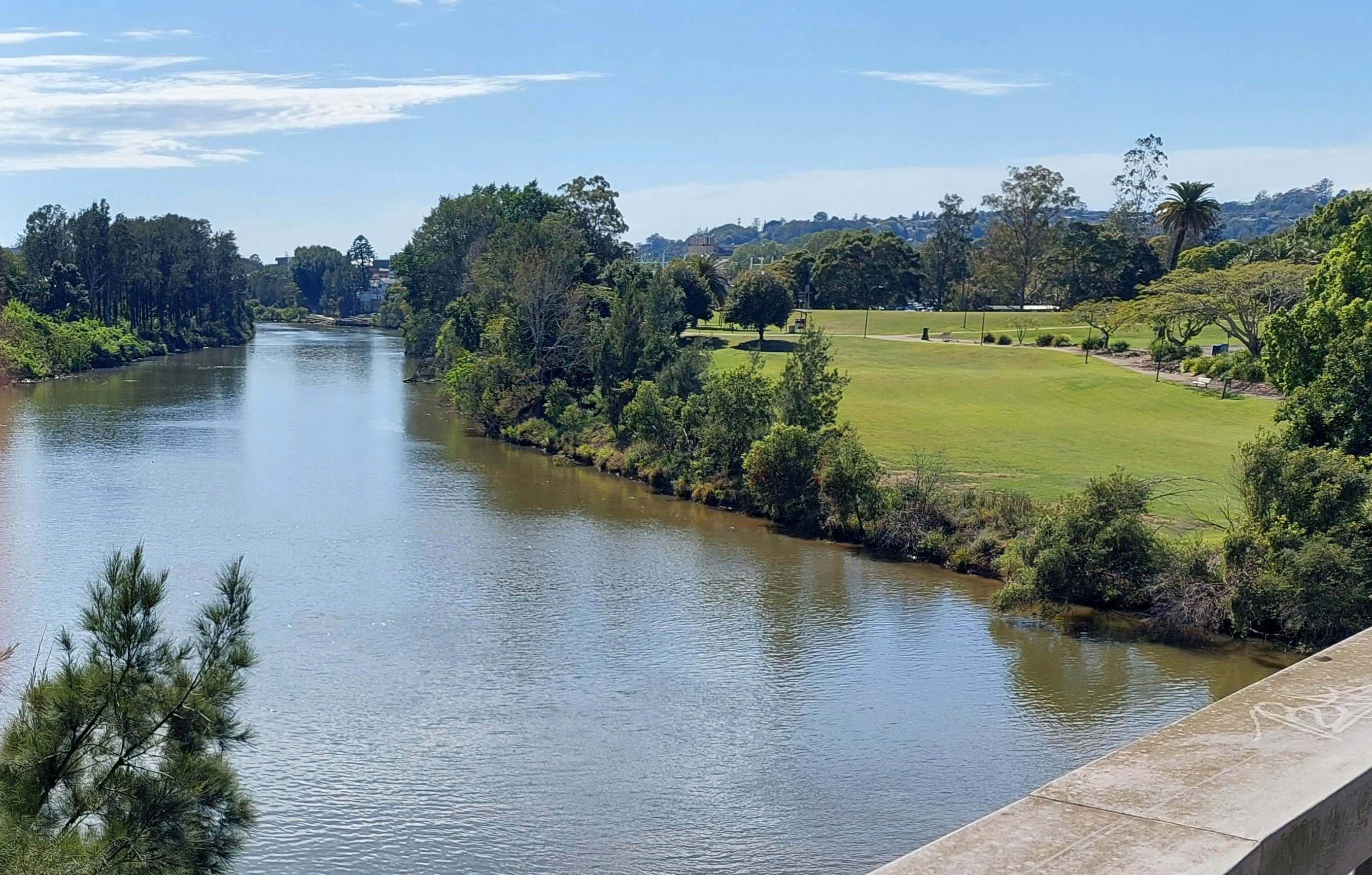
Wilsons River and Riverside Park, Lismore, photographed in 2023

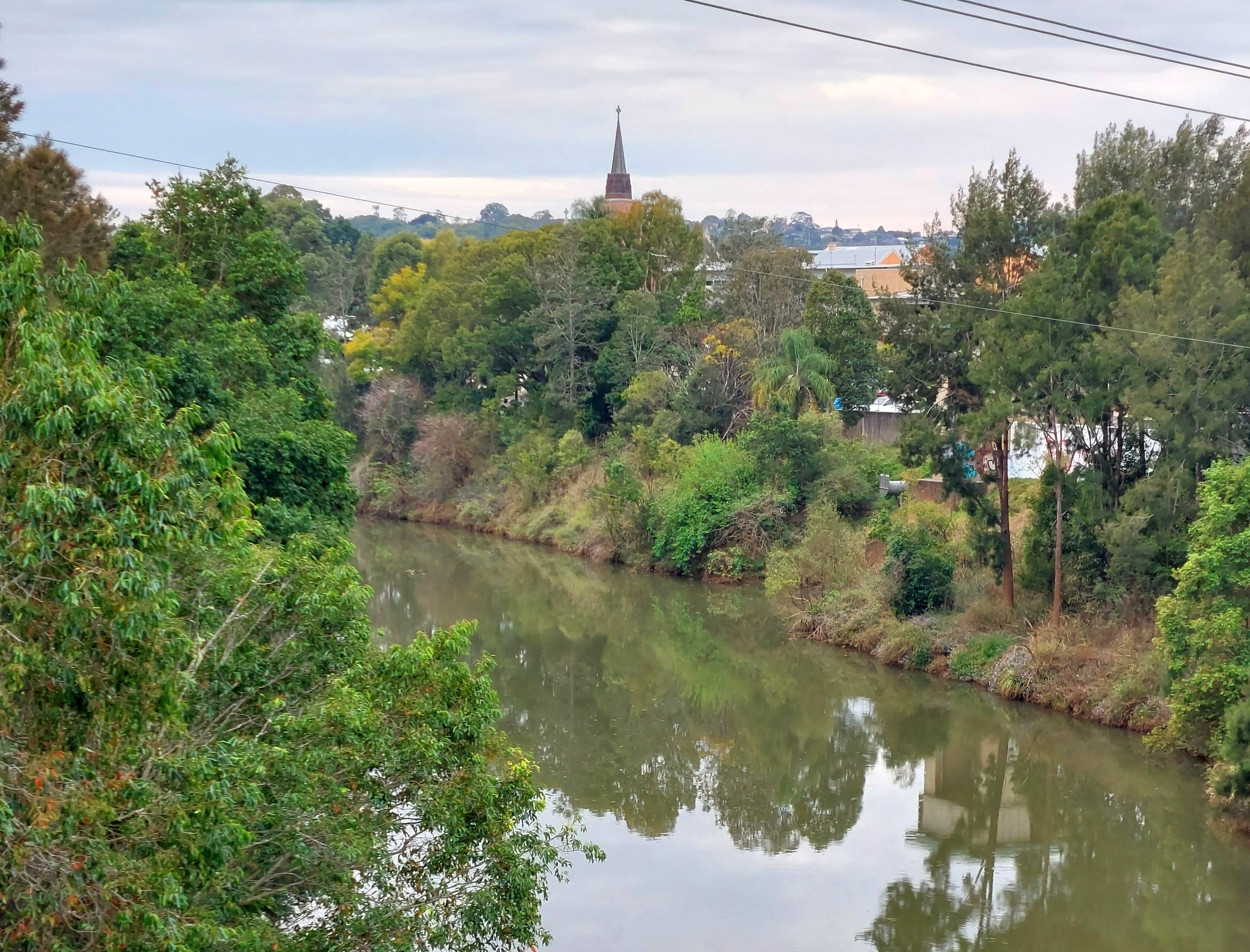
Wilsons River and Coleman's Point, Lismore, photographed in 2023

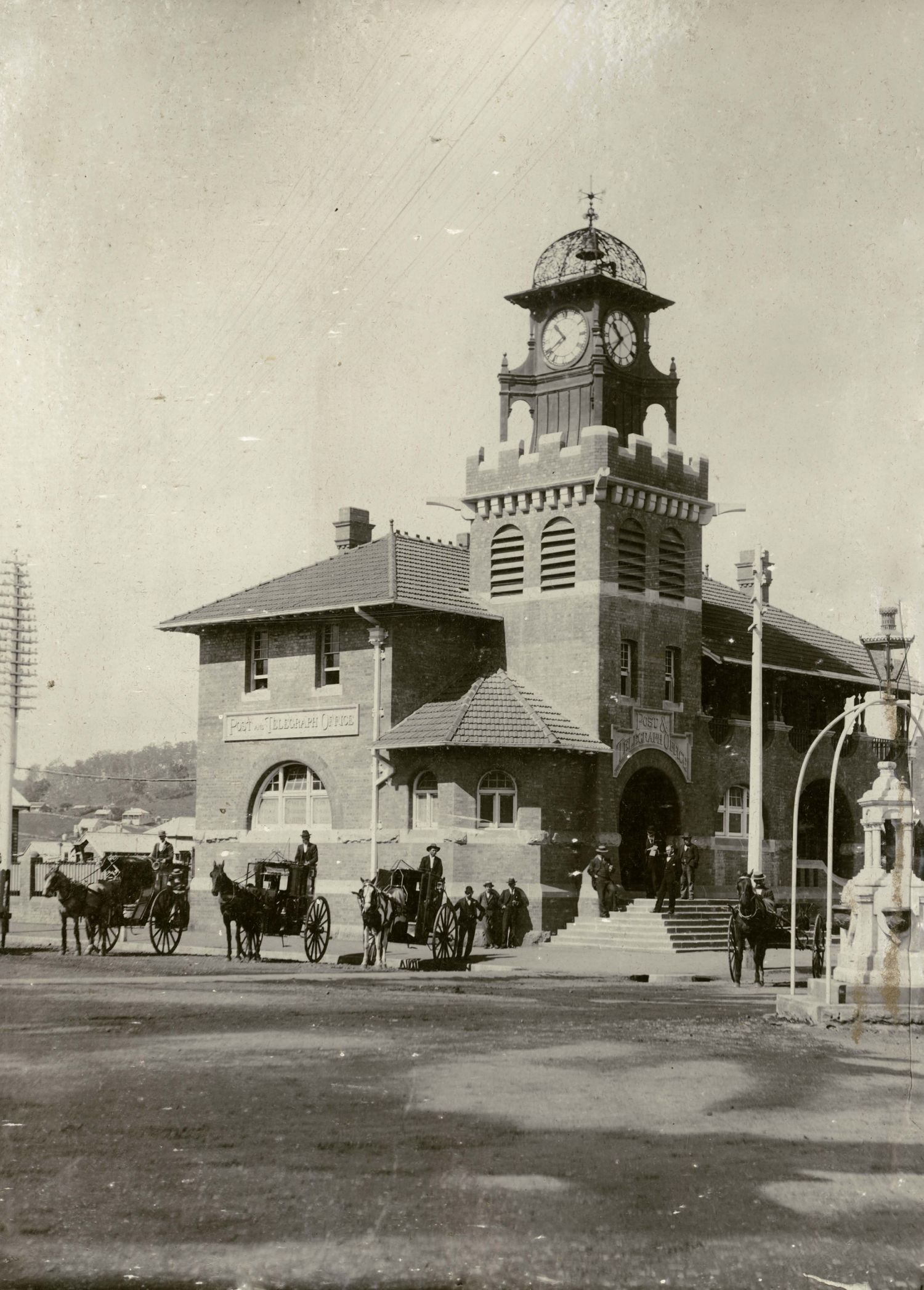
The Art Nouveau style Post and Telegraph Office at Lismore (1898), photographed circa 1904

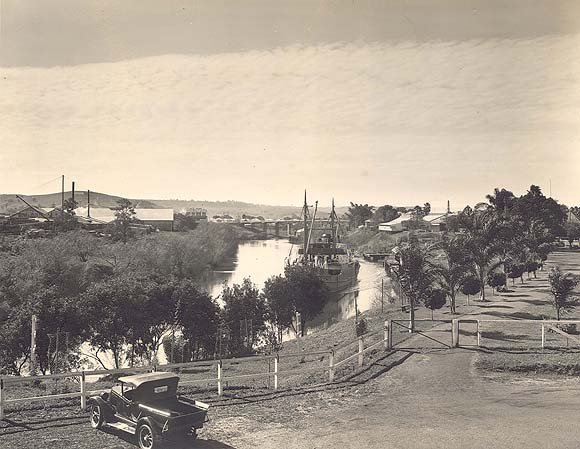
Richmond (now Wilsons) River, Lismore - historical photograph with river traffic (date not known)

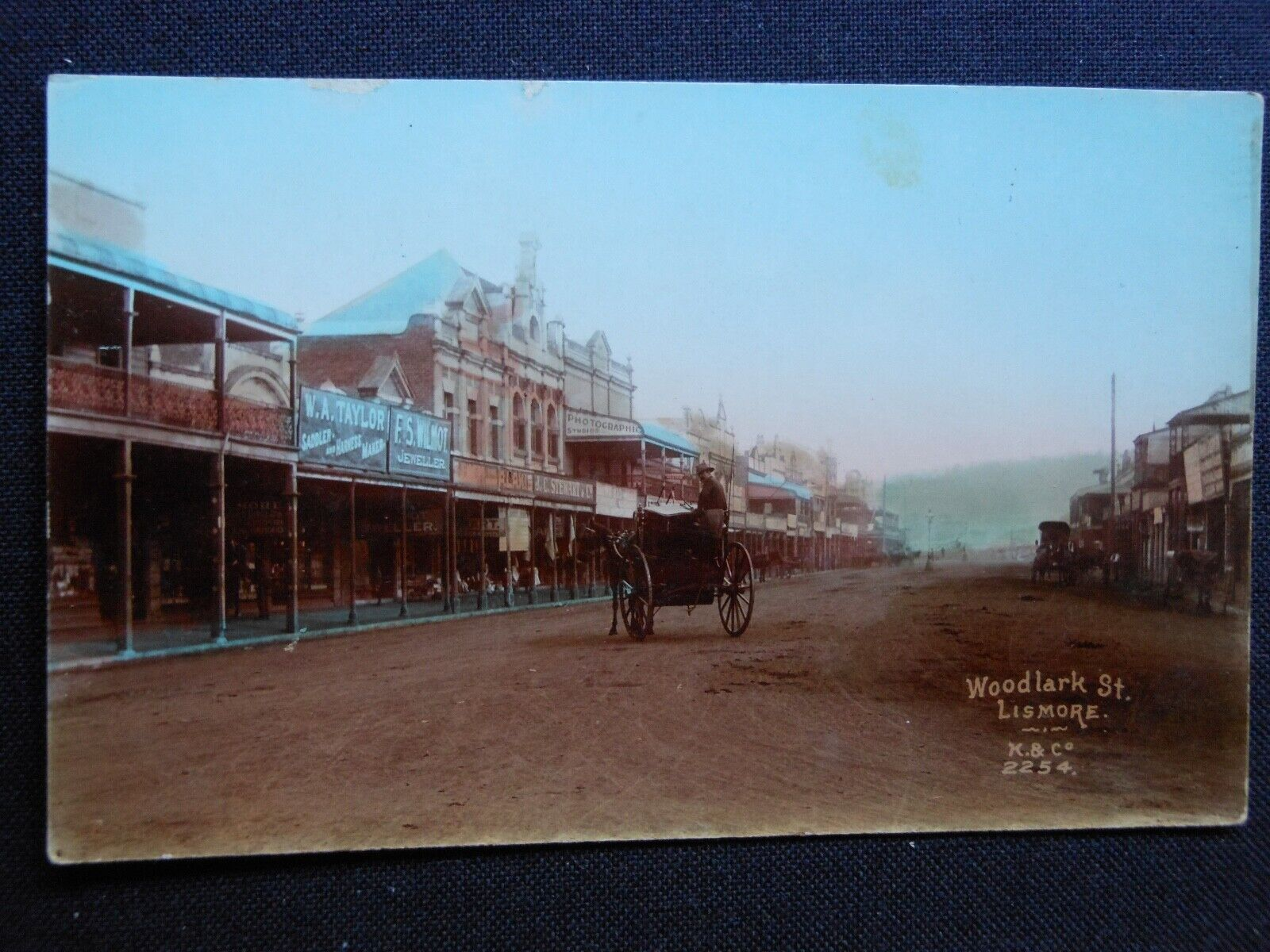
Woodlark Street, Lismore, 1800s (B&W postcard, colourised)

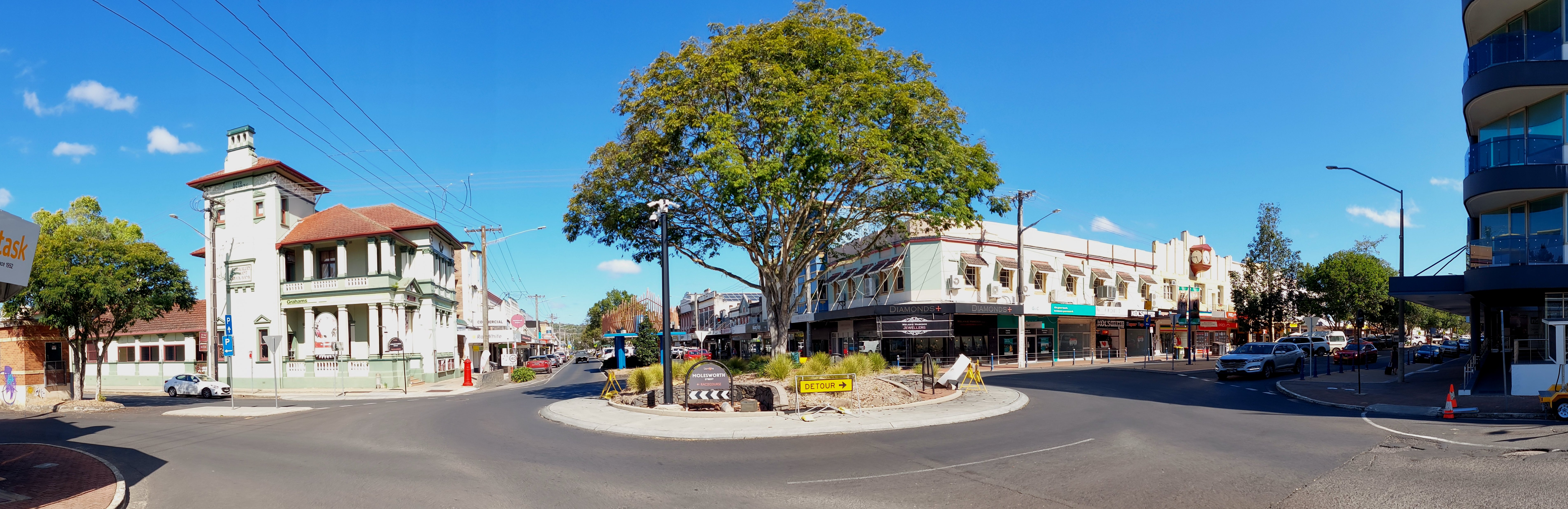
Junction of Molesworth and Woodlark Streets, Lismore, October 2023

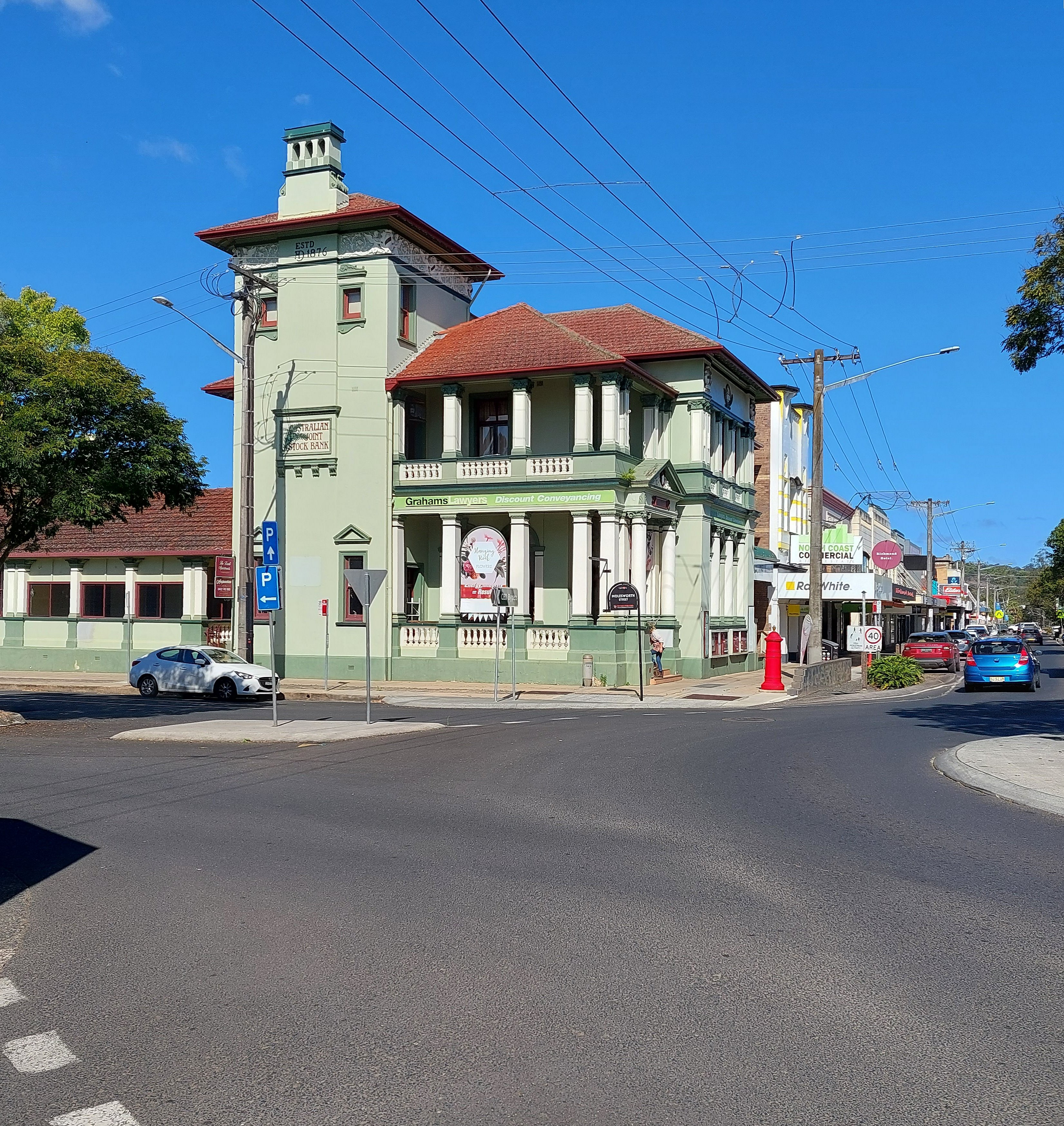
Former Joint Stock Bank Building, Lismore (1891), photographed in 2023

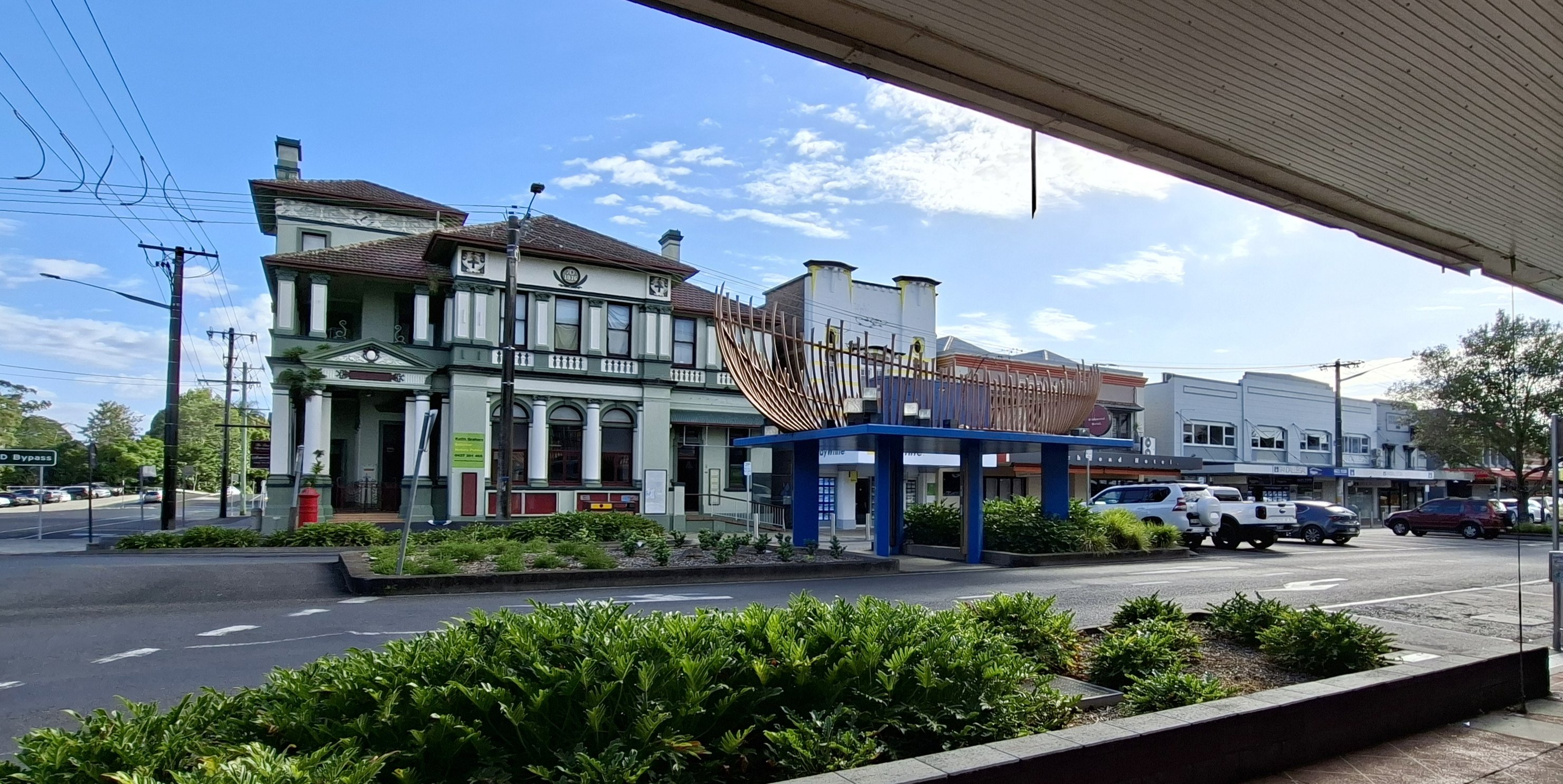
Former Joint Stock Bank building (1891) and Woodlark Street, January 2026

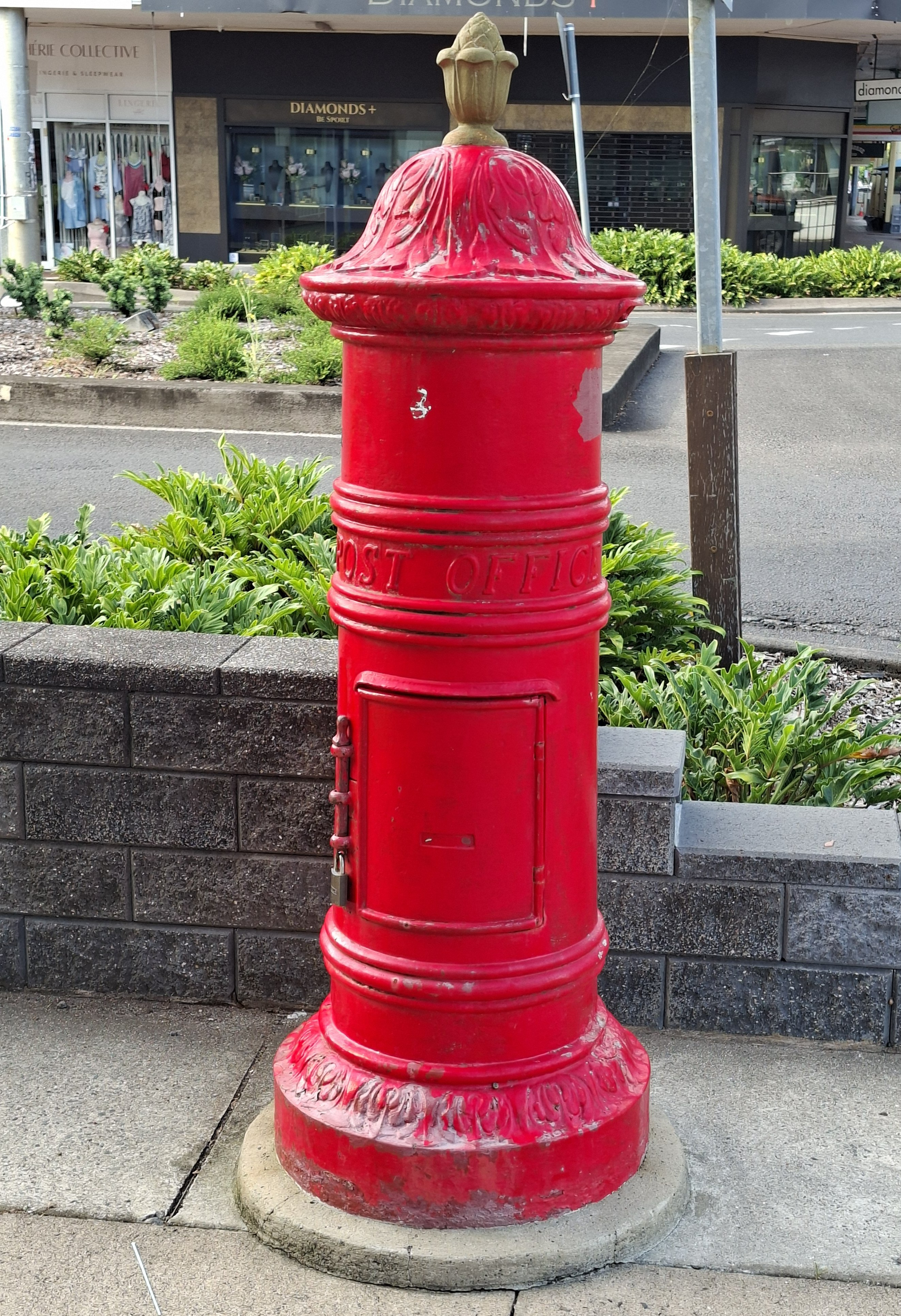
Historic post box, Woodlark St., Lismore NSW (1890s), January 2026

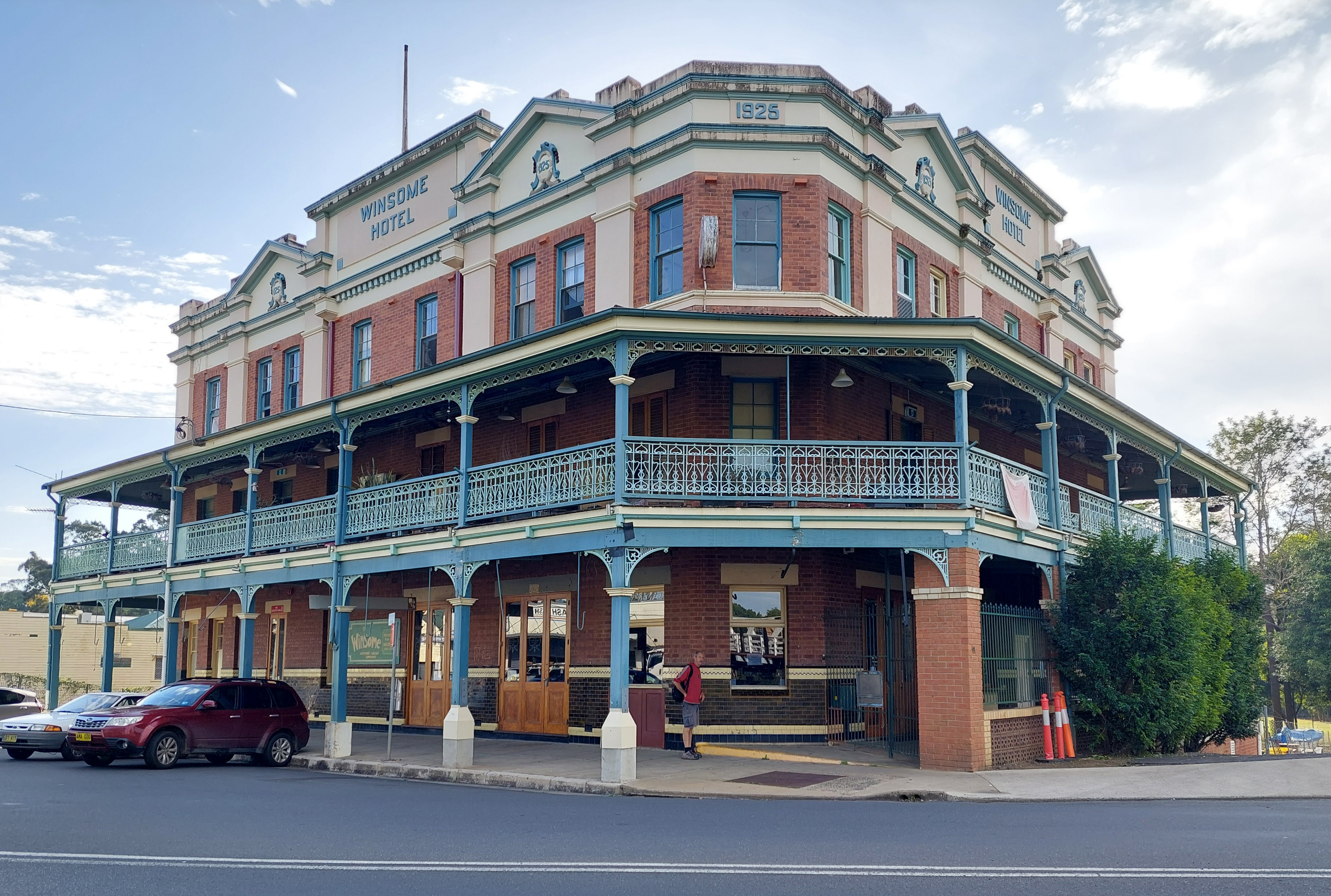
The 1925 Winsome Hotel in Lismore, NSW, photographed in 2023

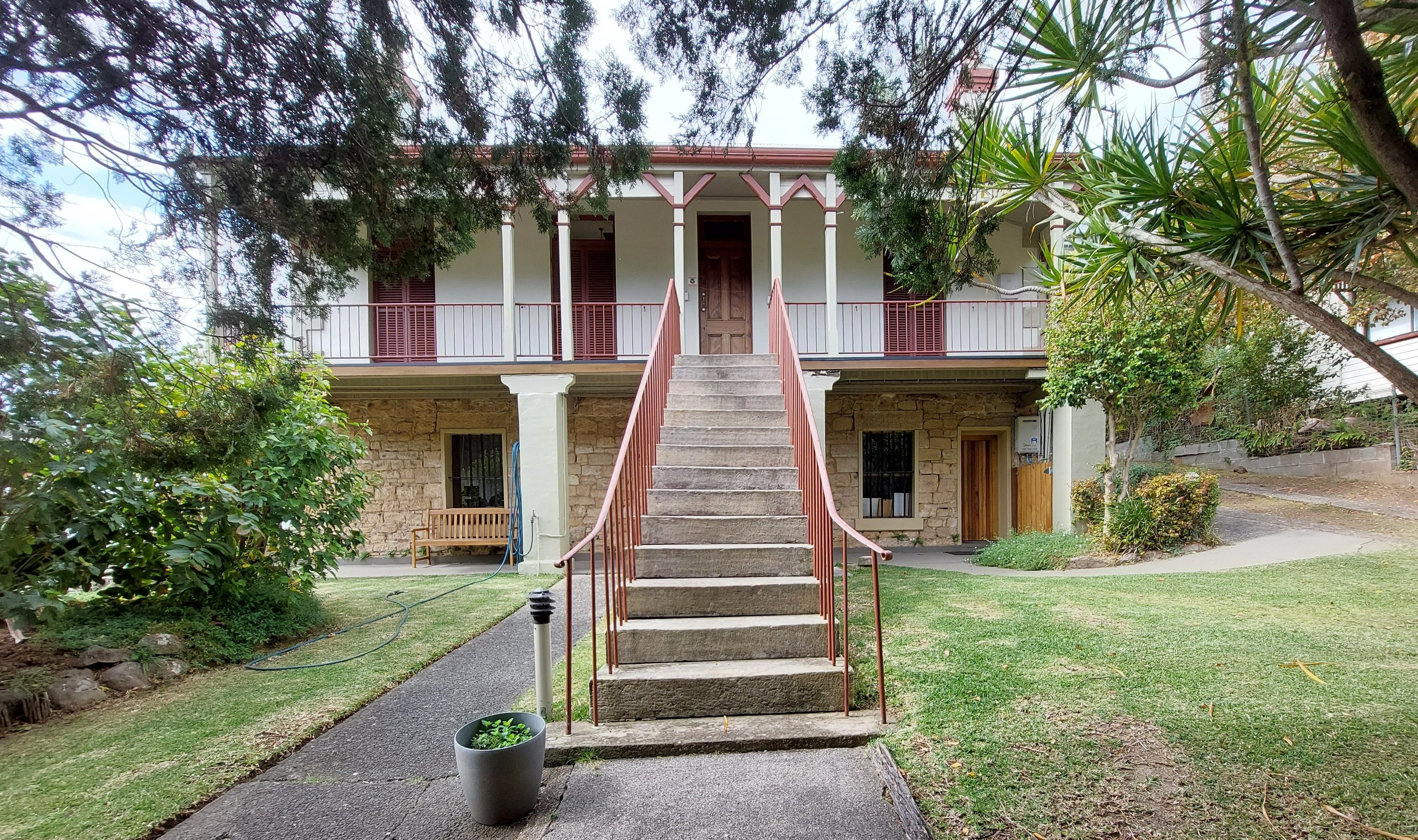
Riverview House in Lismore, NSW, an early stone built merchant's residence in Molesworth Street, photographed in 2023

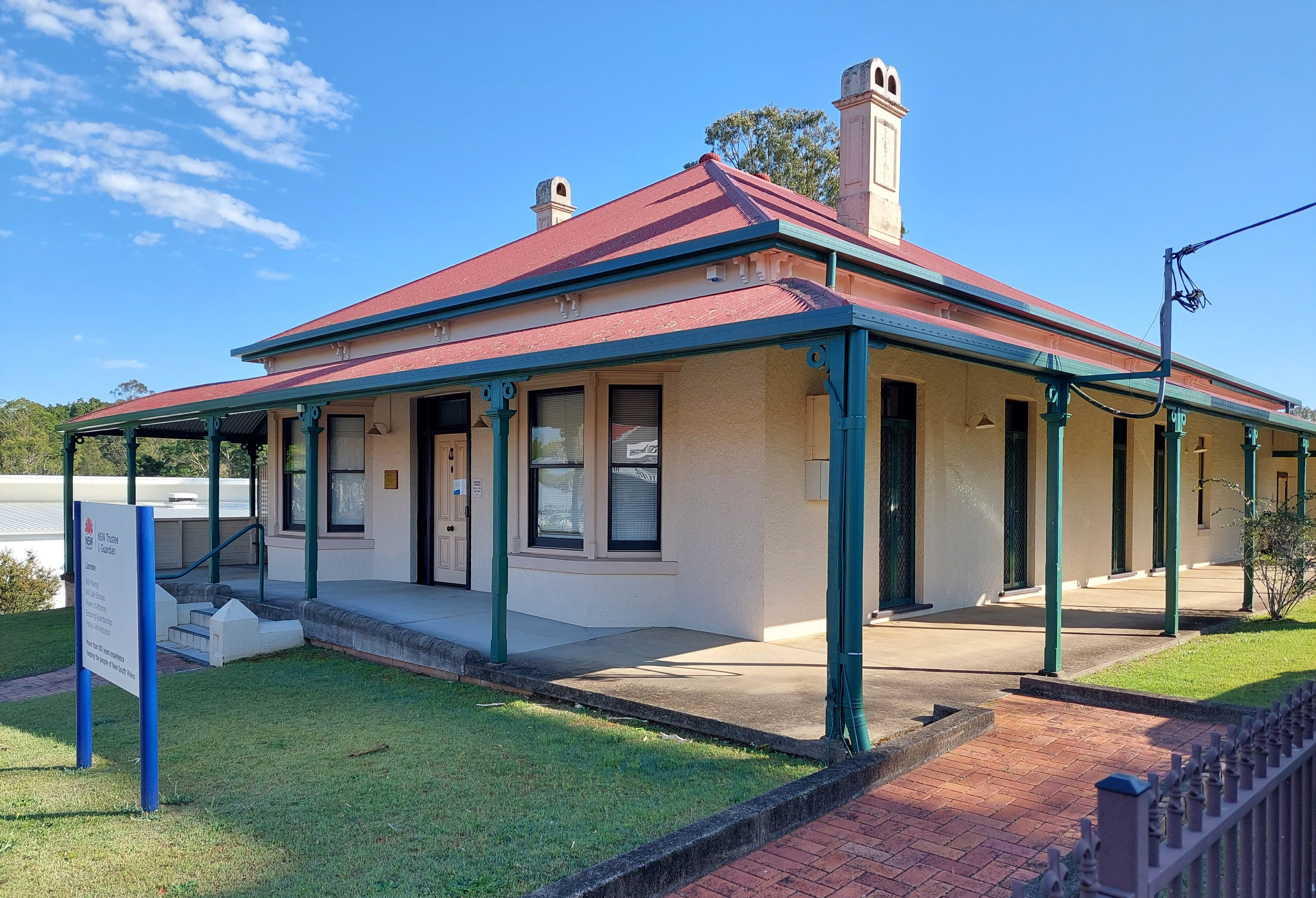
The original 1893 manse (rectory) for the Methodist Church in Zadoc Street, currently (2023) the Lismore office for the NSW Trustee & Guardian

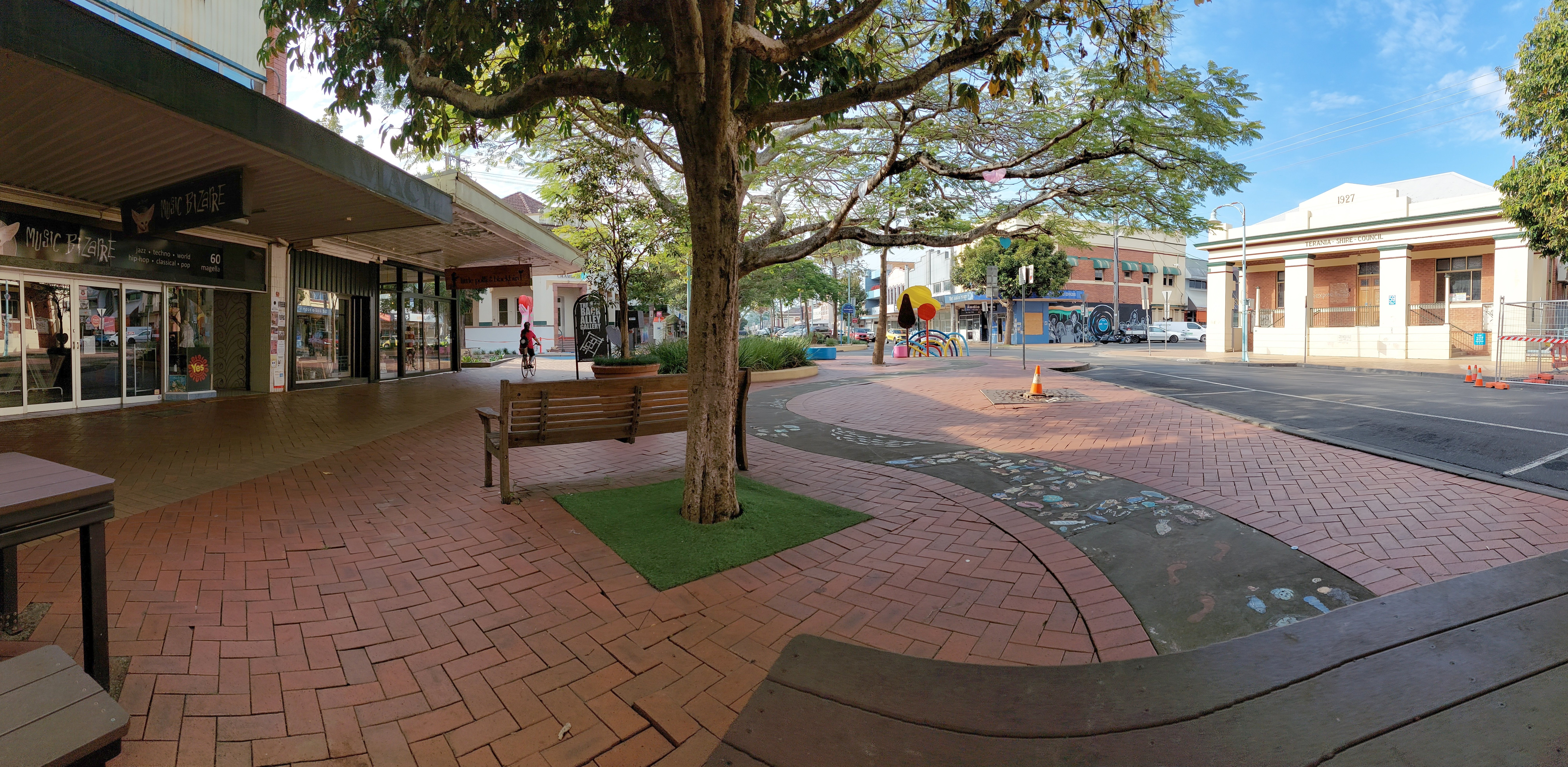
Early morning in Magellan Street, Lismore, NSW, in 2023

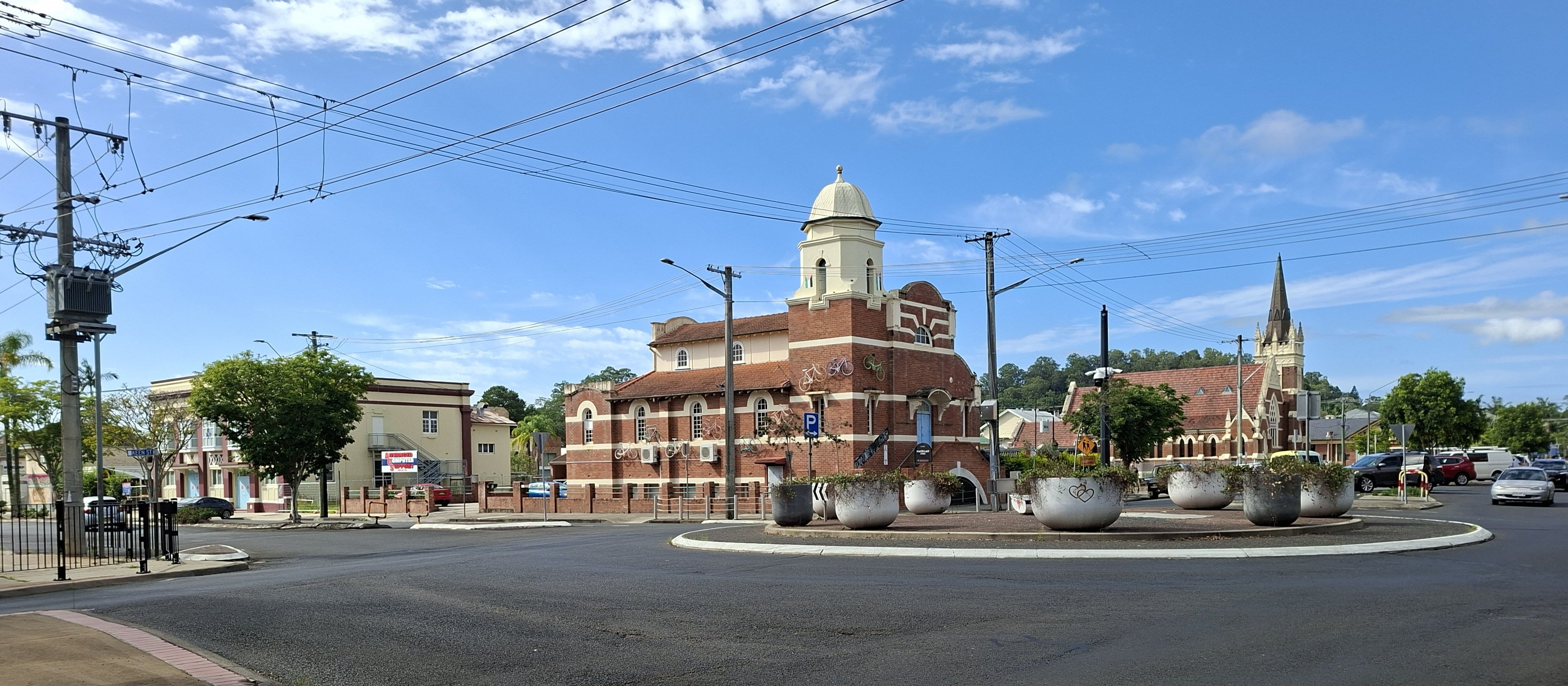
Junction of Keen and Magellan Streets, Lismore, Jan 2026, showing historic buildings, L-R: Masonic Temple (1913), Church of Christ (1923), St Paul's Presbyterian Church (1908)

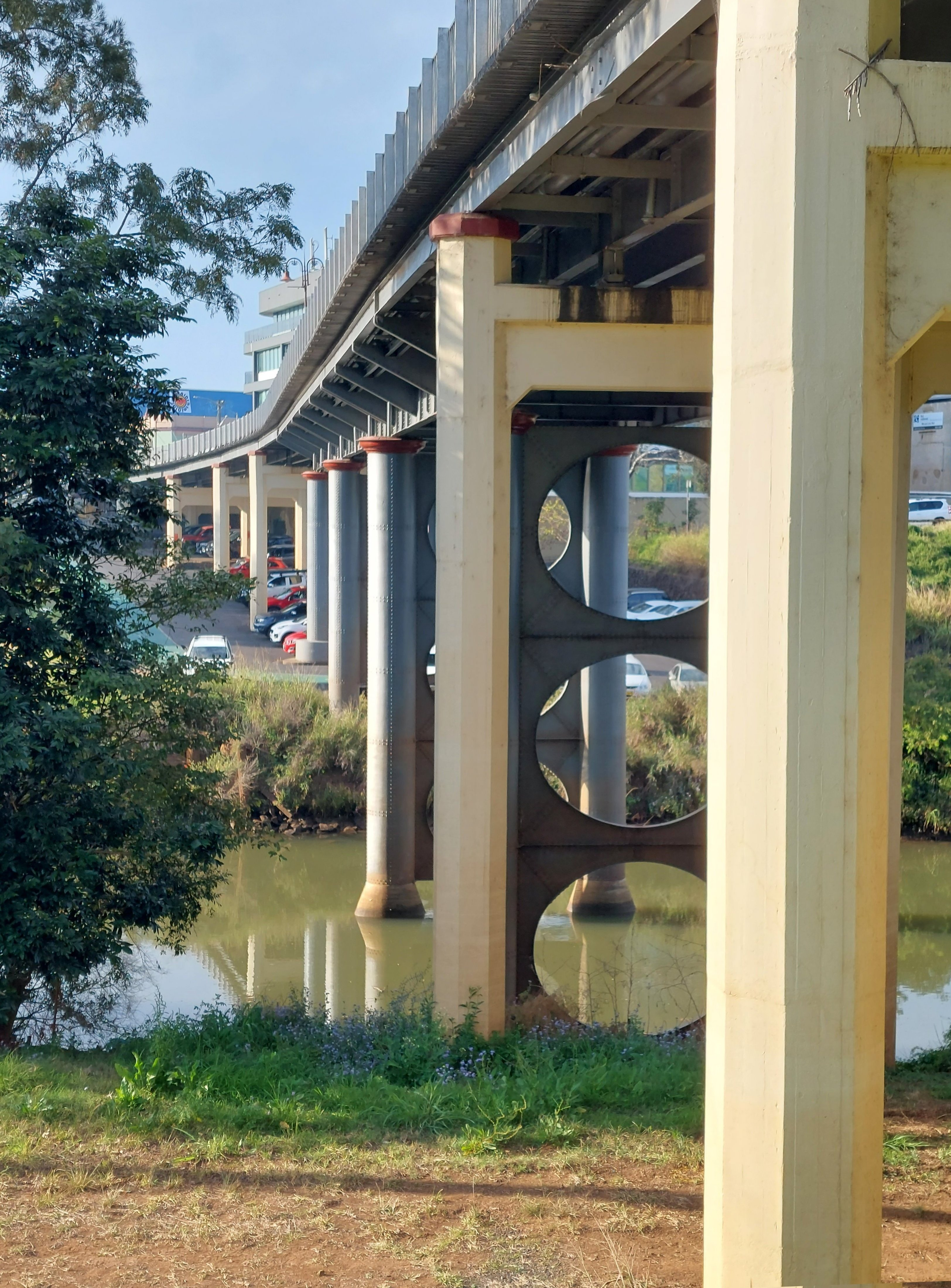
Fawcett Bridge in Lismore, NSW in 2023

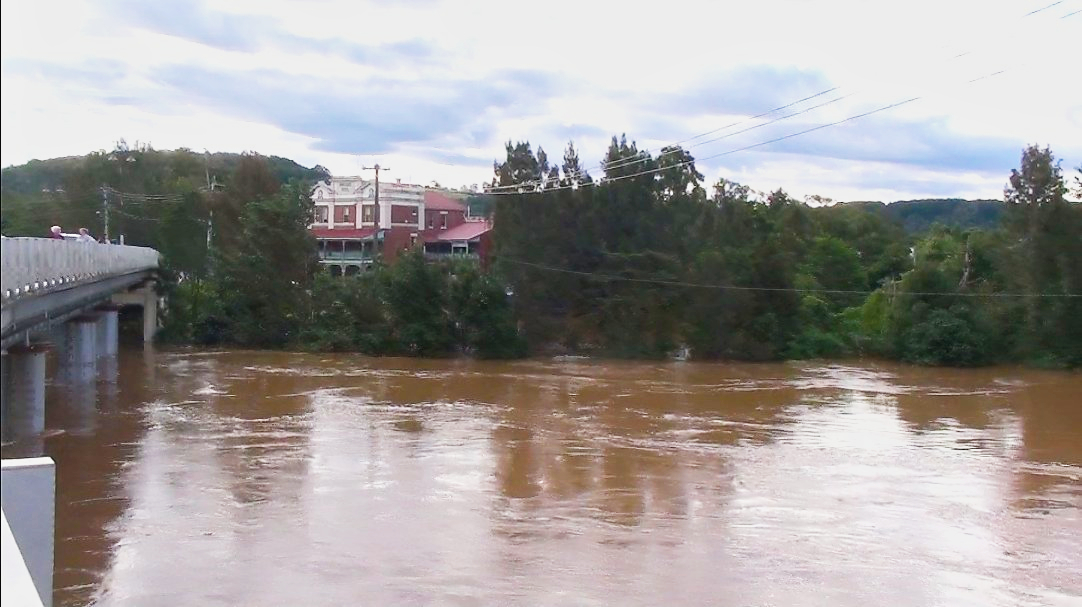
Wilsons River in moderate flood at Lismore, NSW, 5 June 2016 (1)

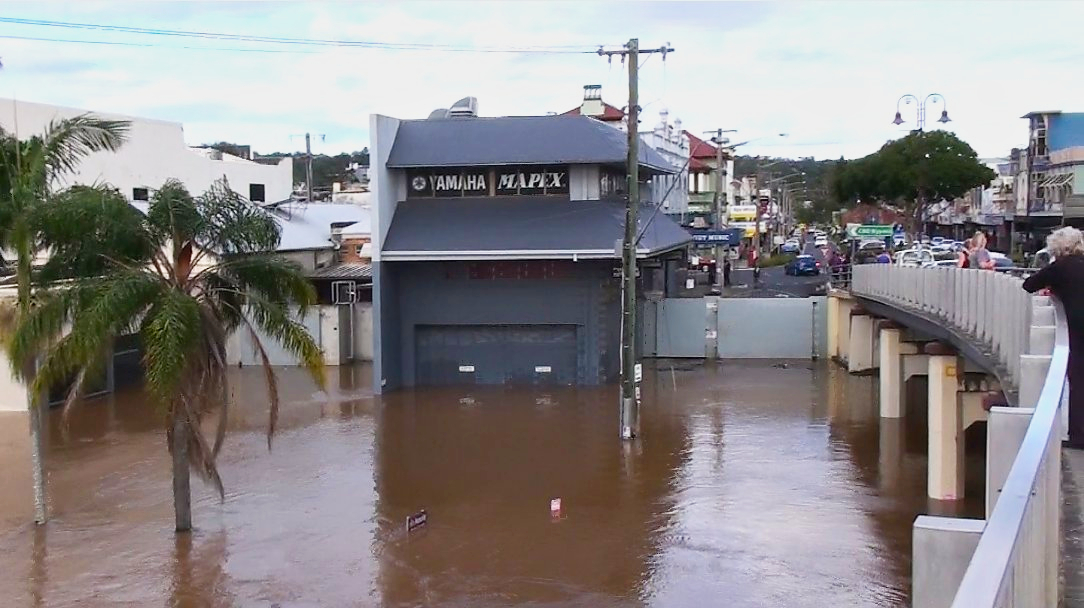
Wilsons River in moderate flood at Lismore, NSW, 5 June 2016 (2)

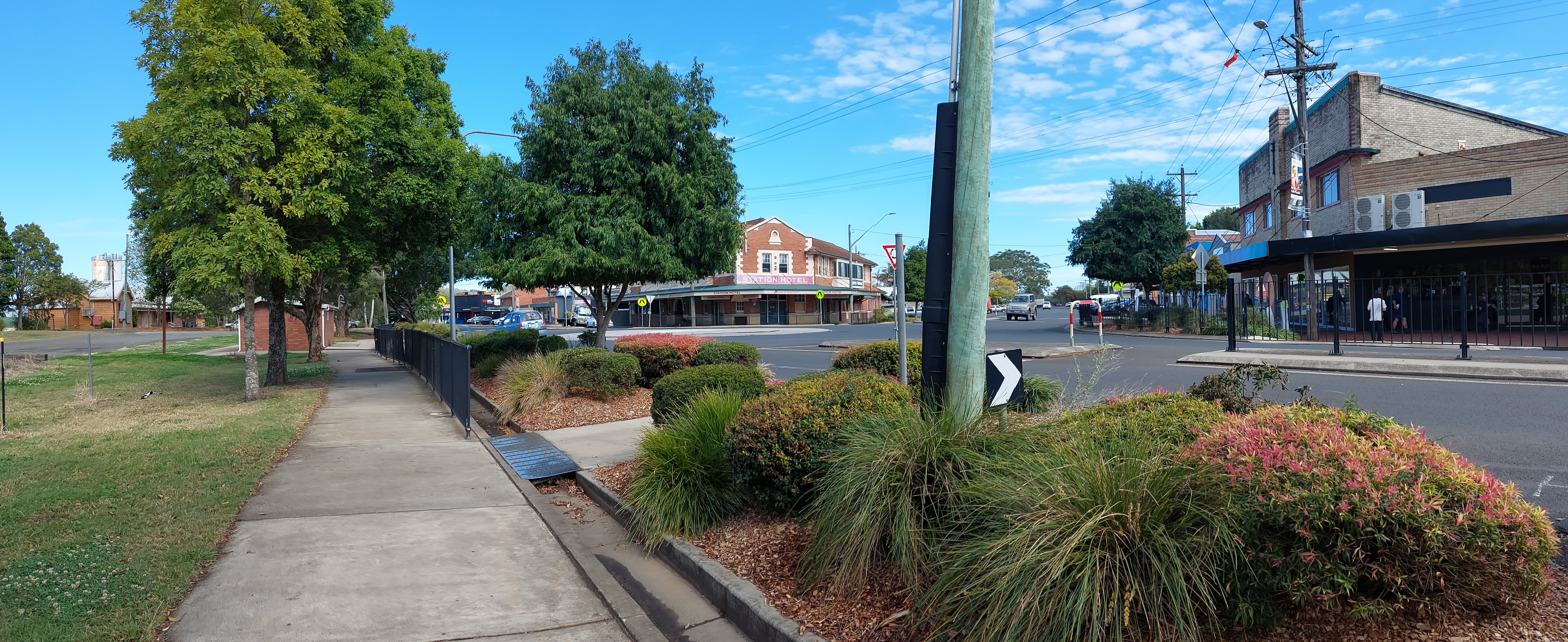
South Lismore near Lismore railway station

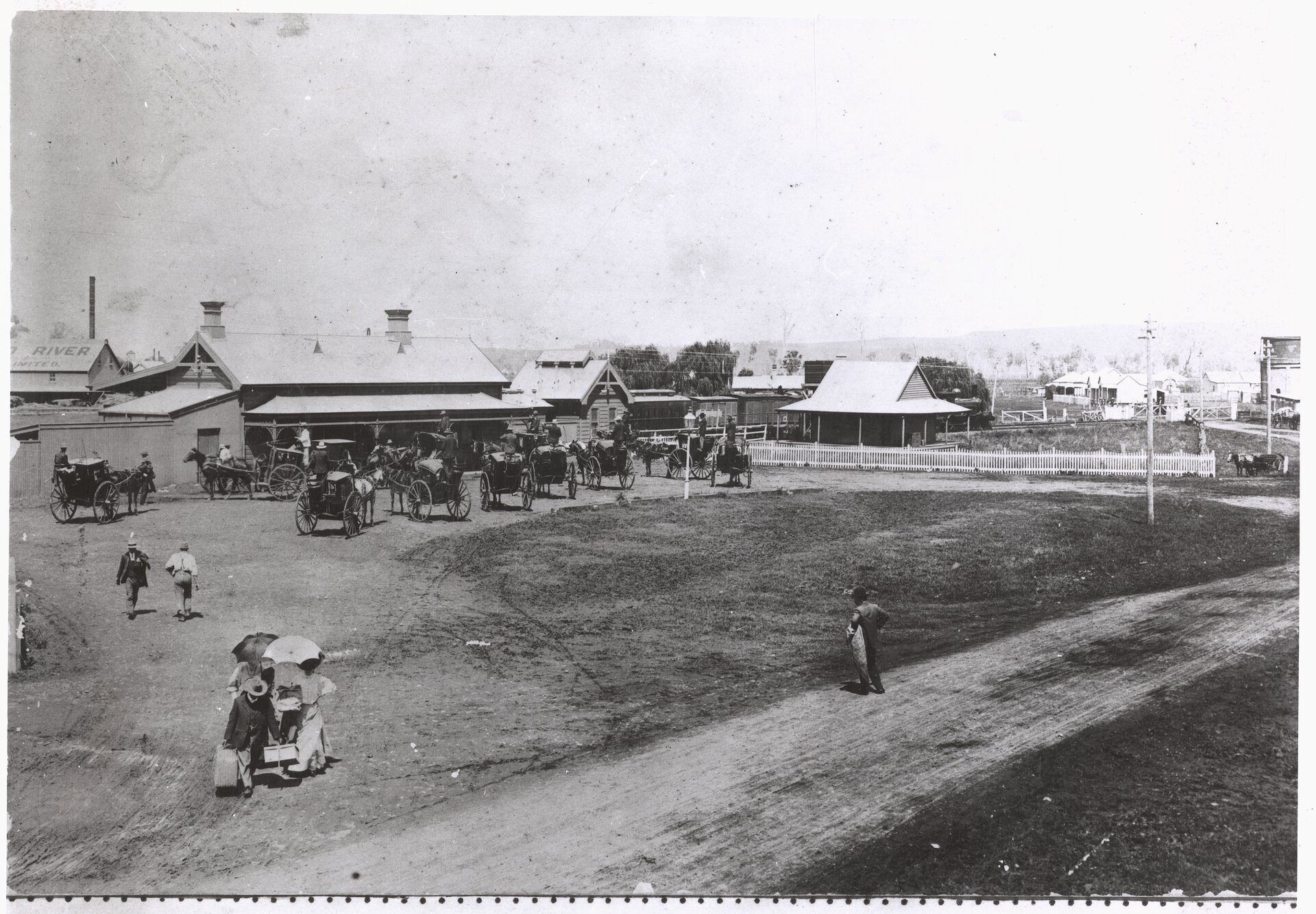
Lismore Railway station, early 1900s

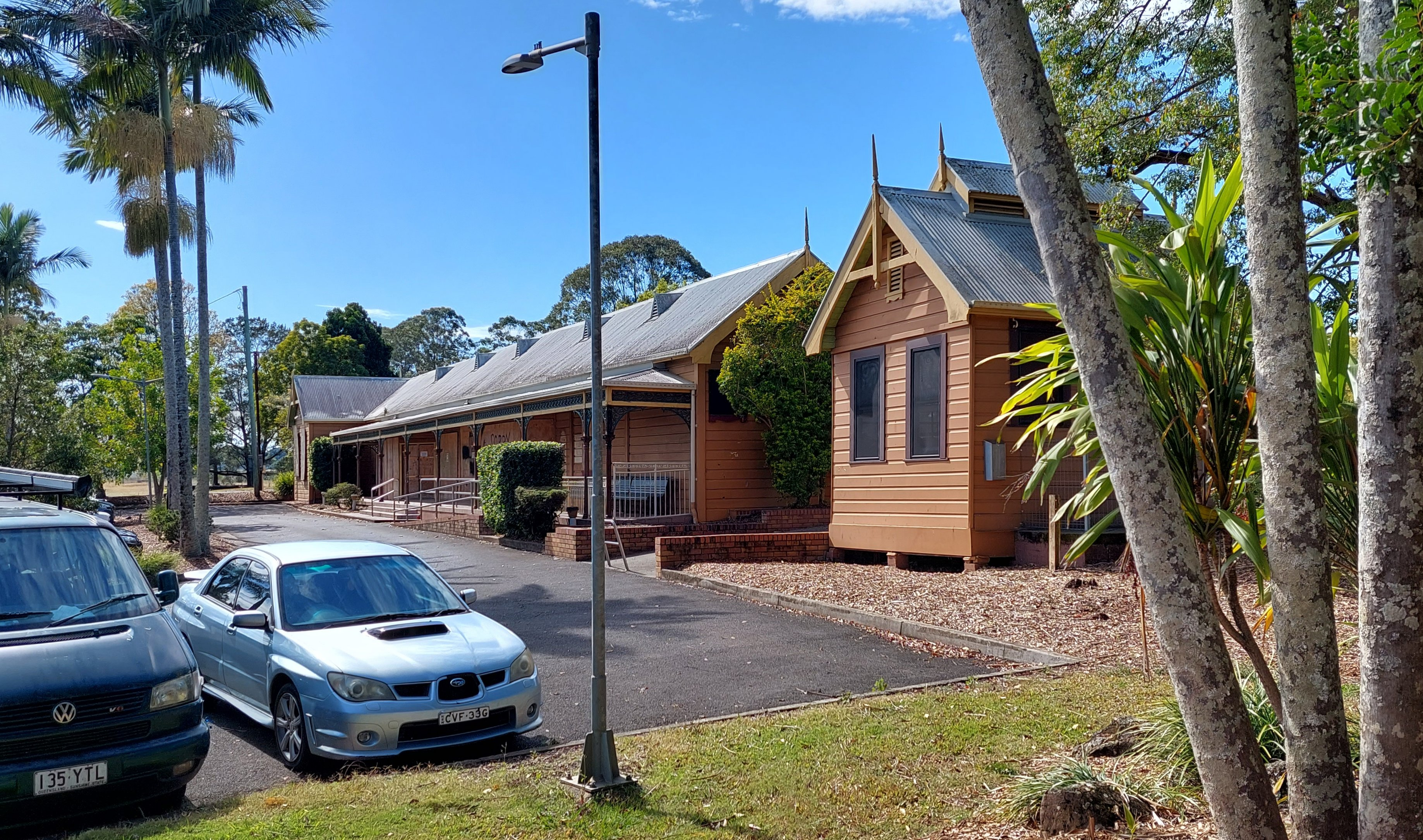
Lismore Railway station in 2023 (1)

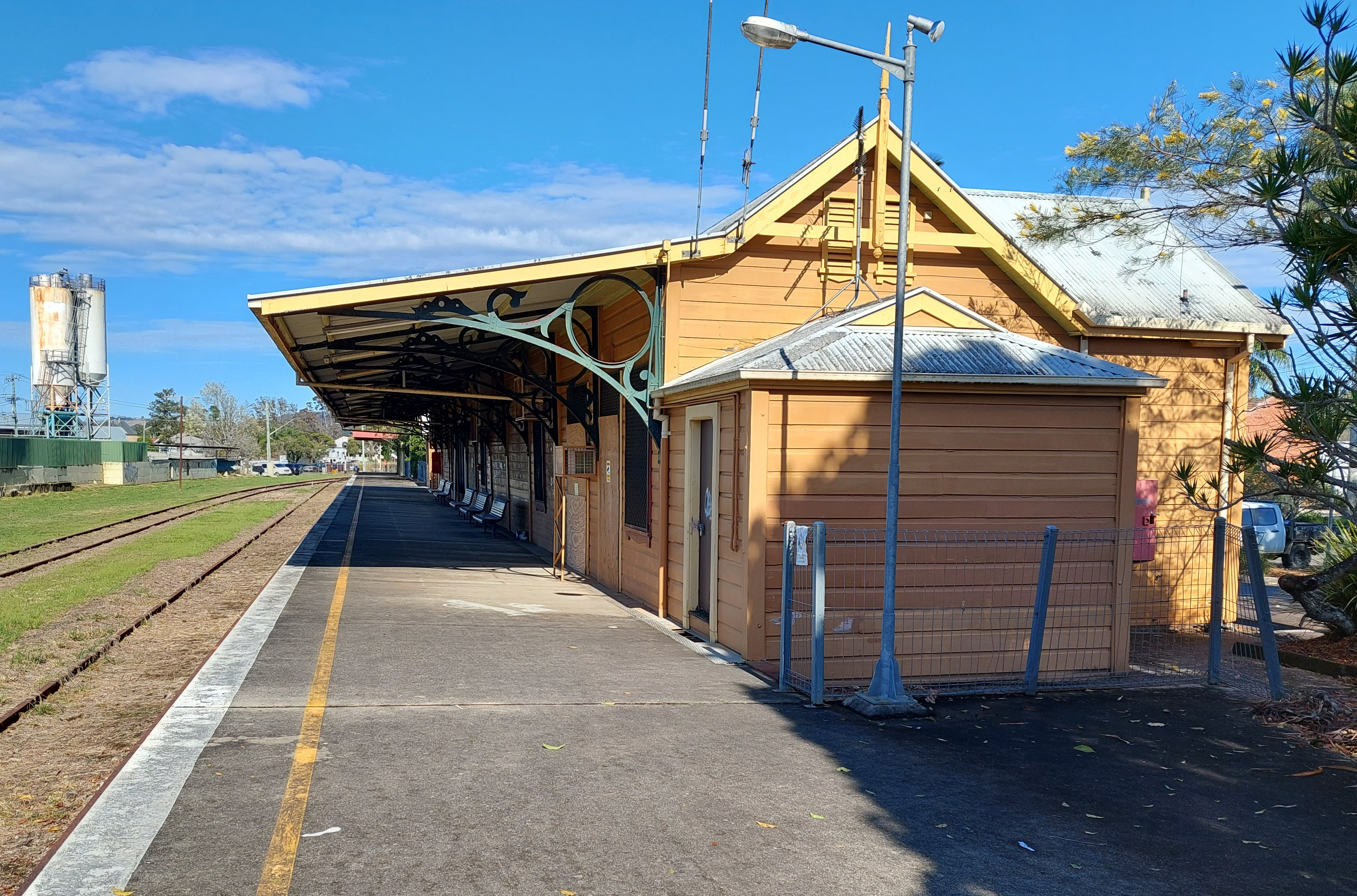
Lismore Railway station in 2023 (2)

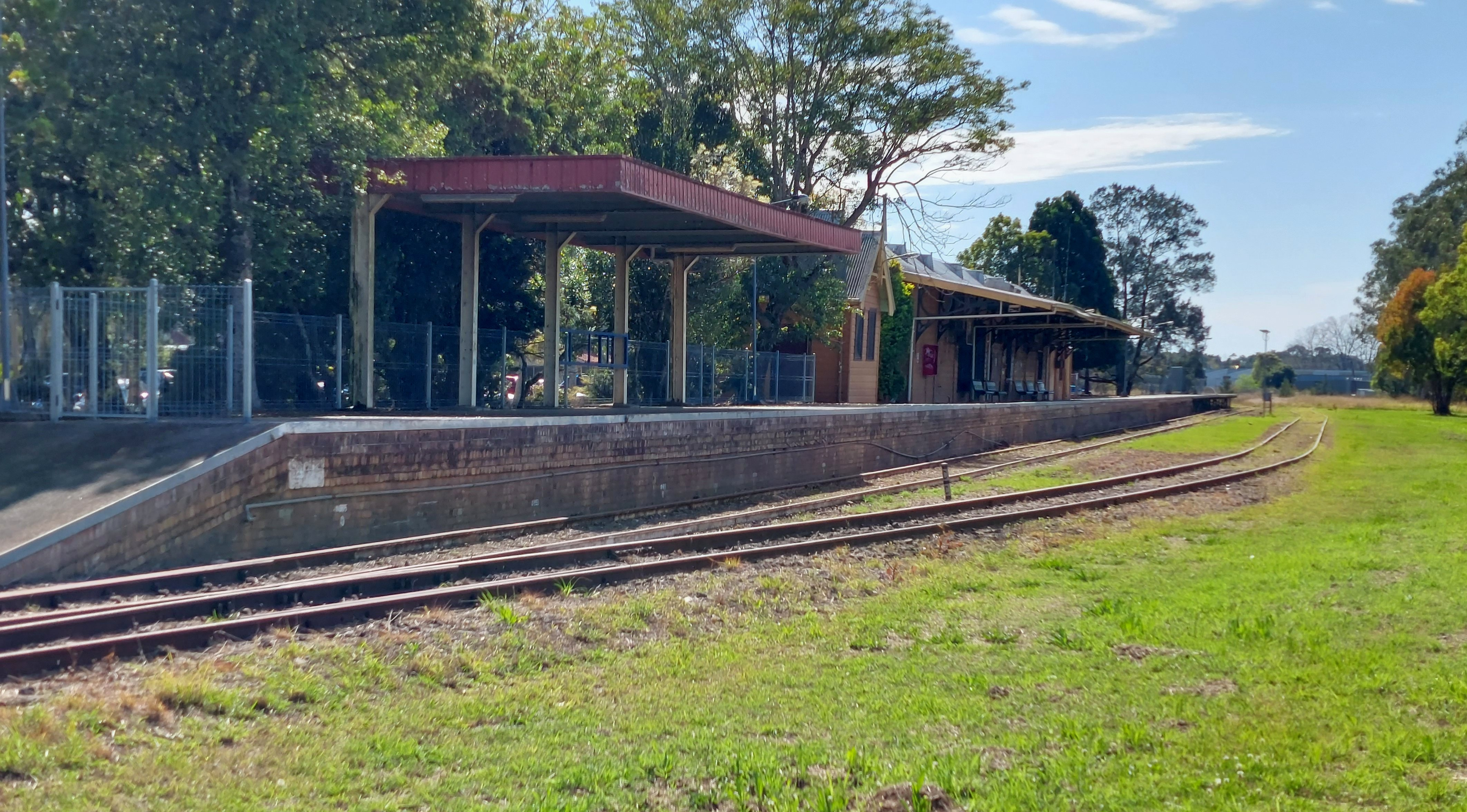
Lismore Railway station in 2023 (3)

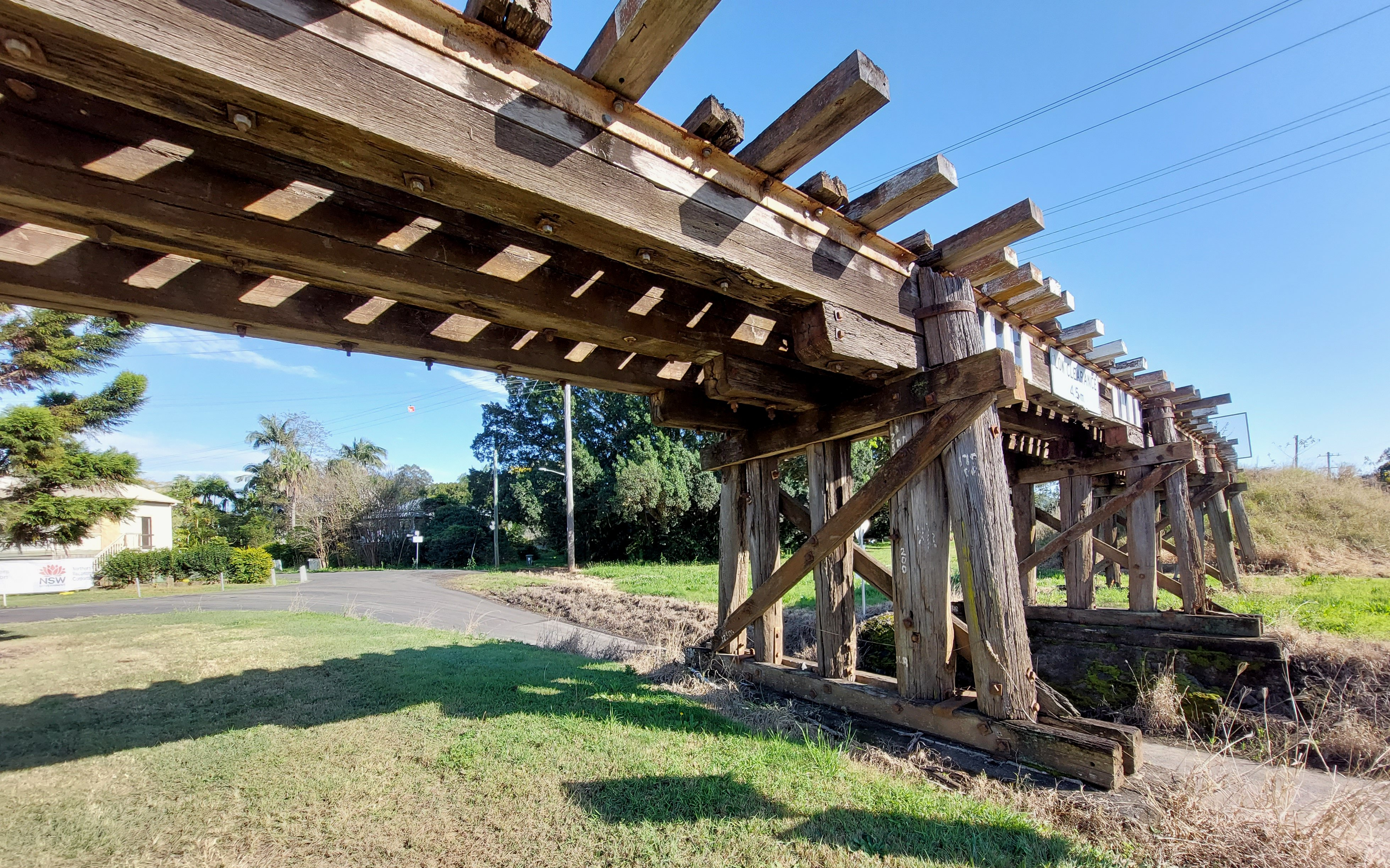
Historic railway viaduct, Union St., Lismore

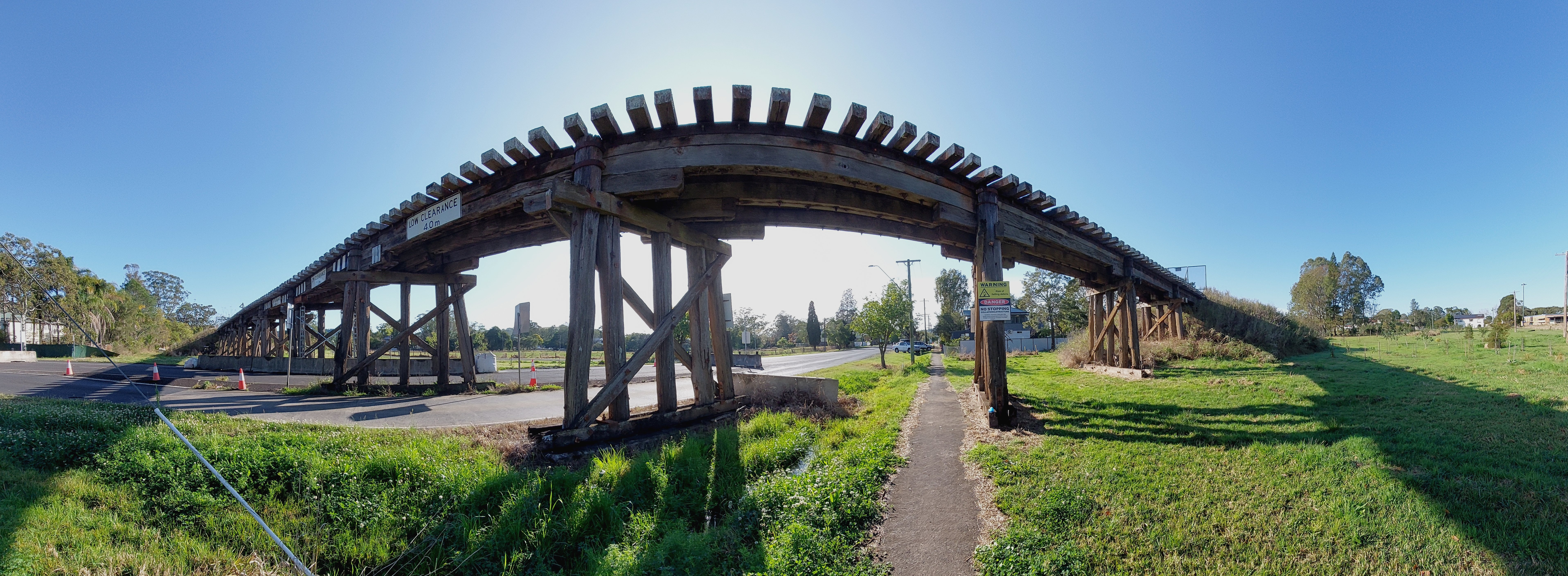
Historic railway viaduct, Terania St., Lismore

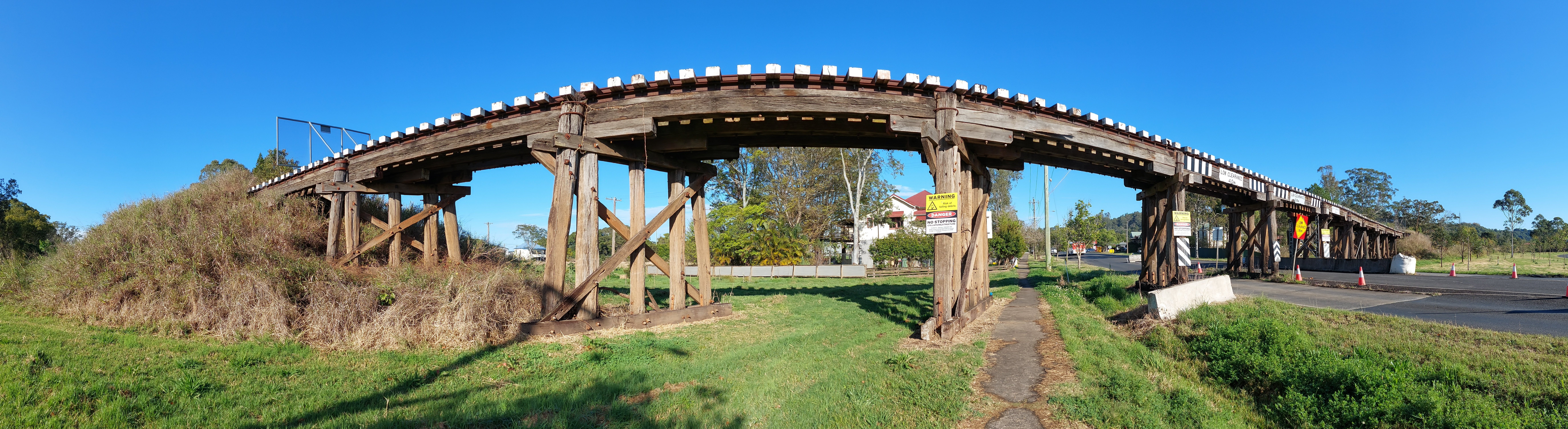
Historic railway viaduct, Terania St., Lismore (another view)

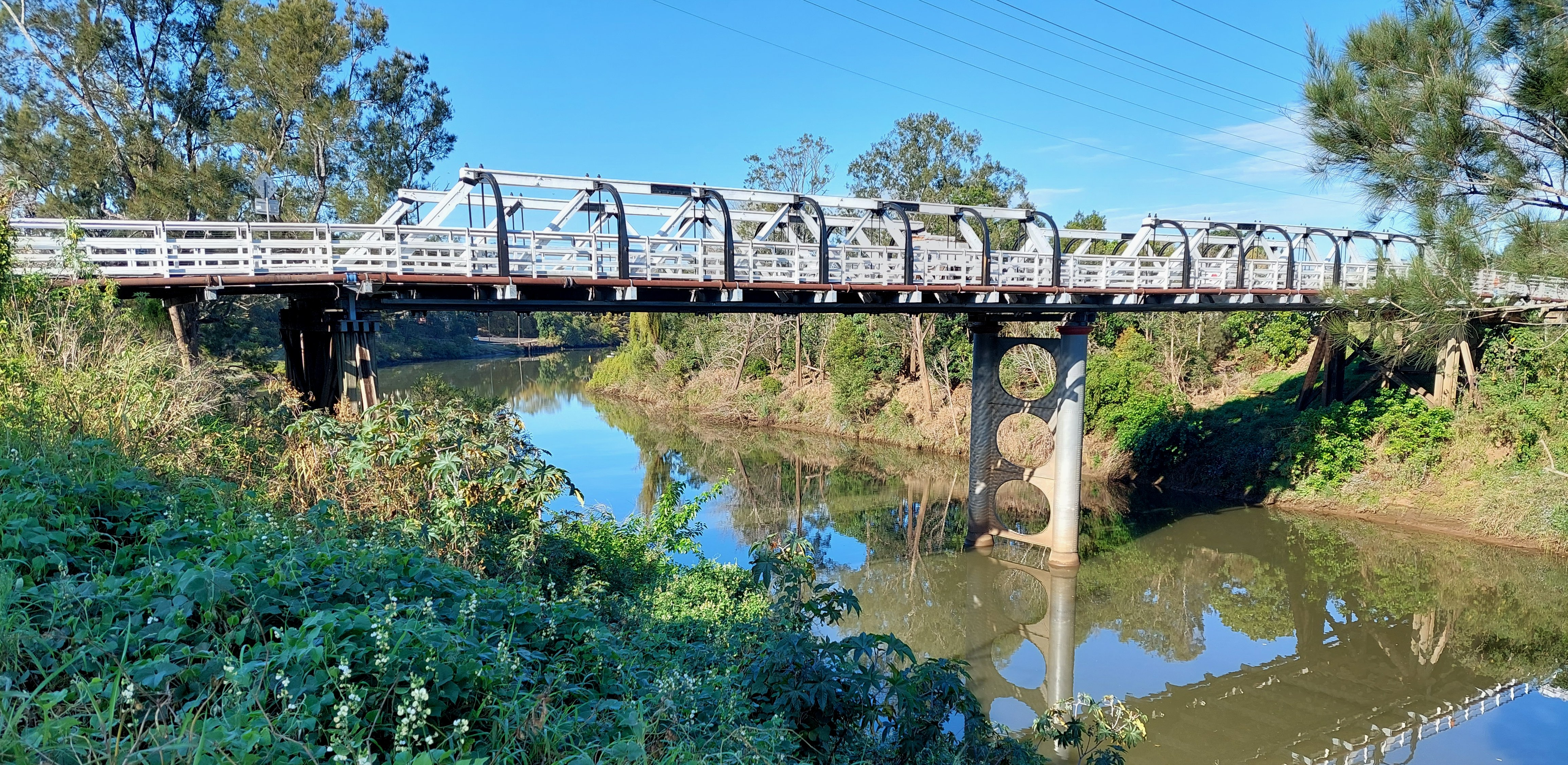
Colemans Bridge over Leycester Creek, Lismore

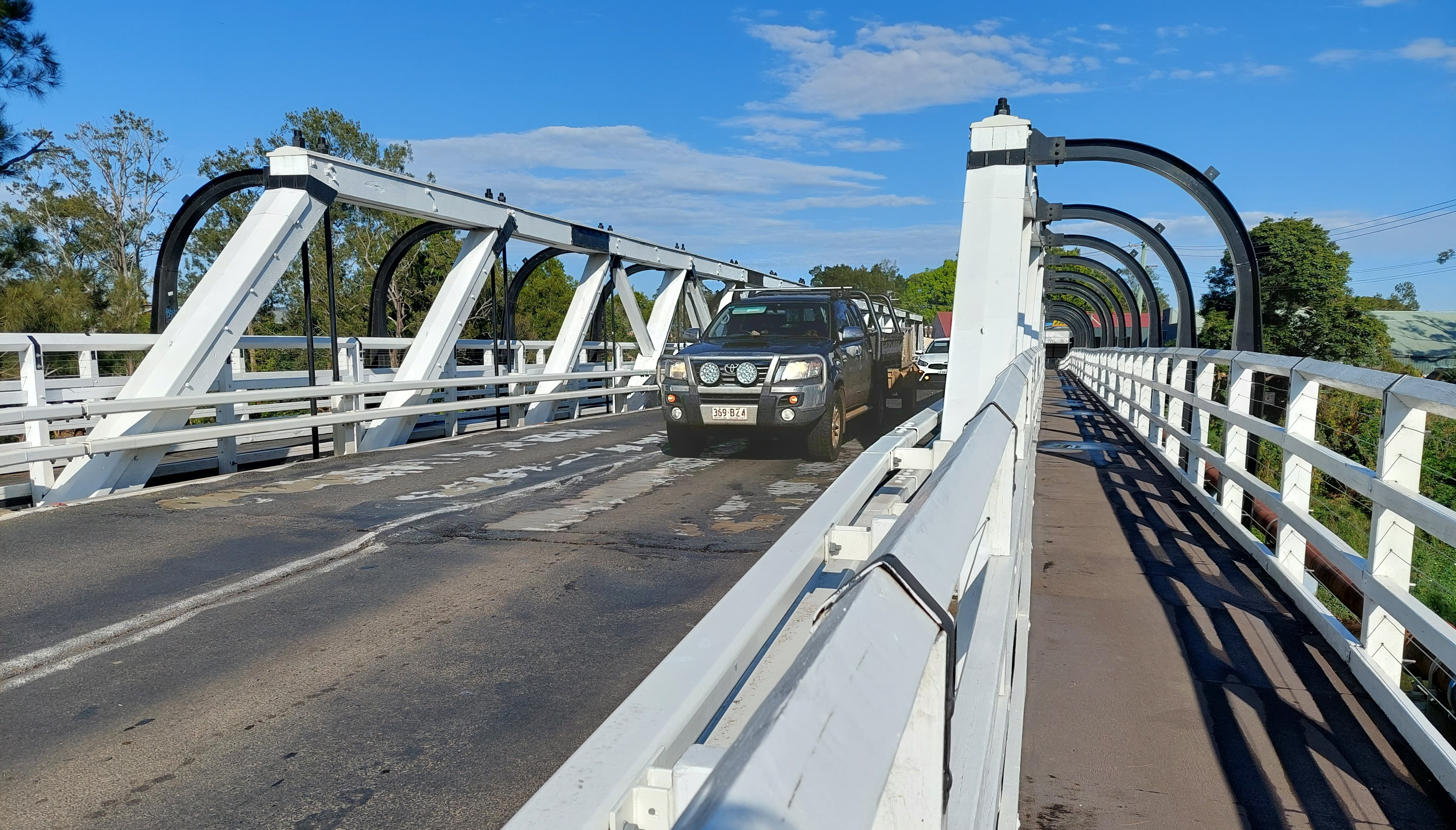
Colemans Bridge over Leycester Creek, Lismore (road view)

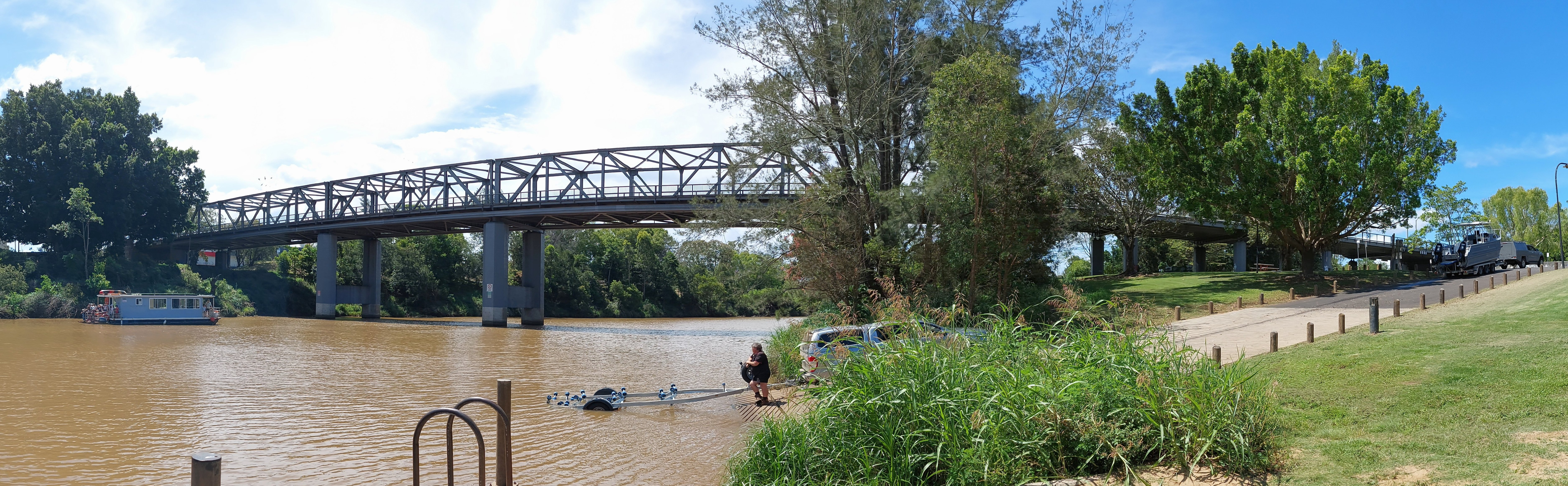
Ballina St. road bridge at Lismore, carrying the Bruxner Highway over the Wilsons River

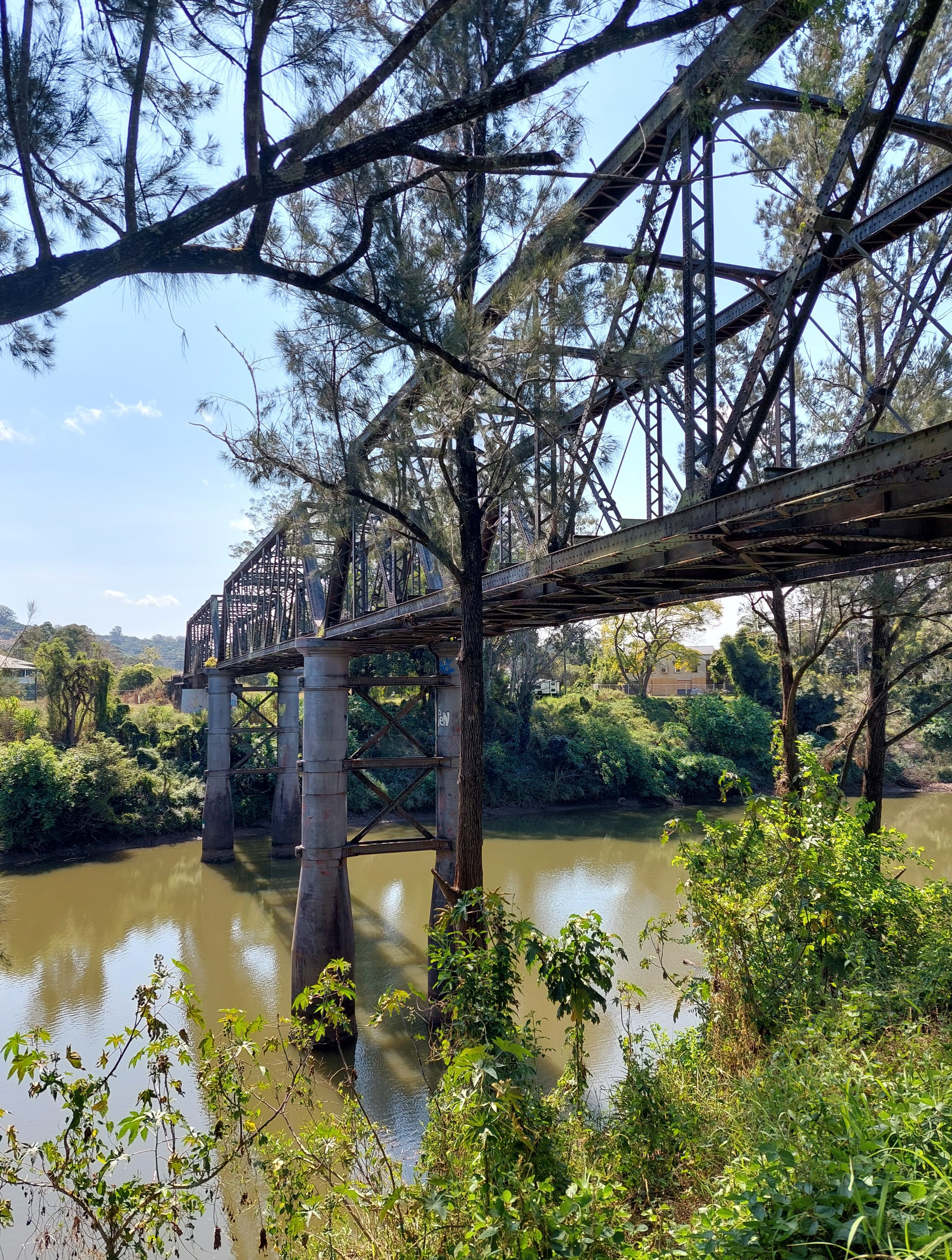
The heritage listed Leycester Creek railway bridge, from the Union Street end

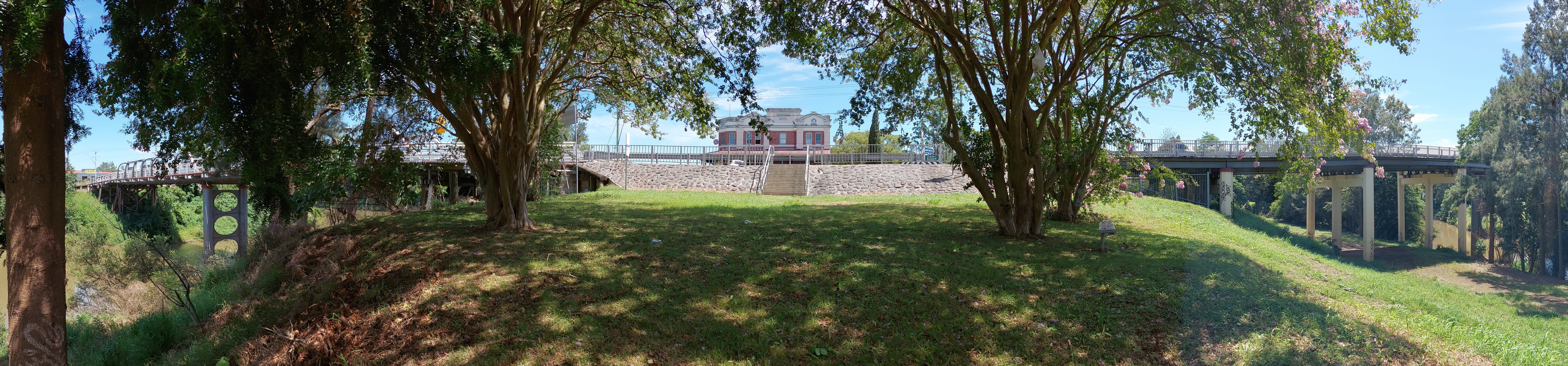
View from Two Bridges Park in Lismore, New South Wales, December 2023 - panorama showing Colemans and Fawcett Bridges, with Winsome Hotel between
