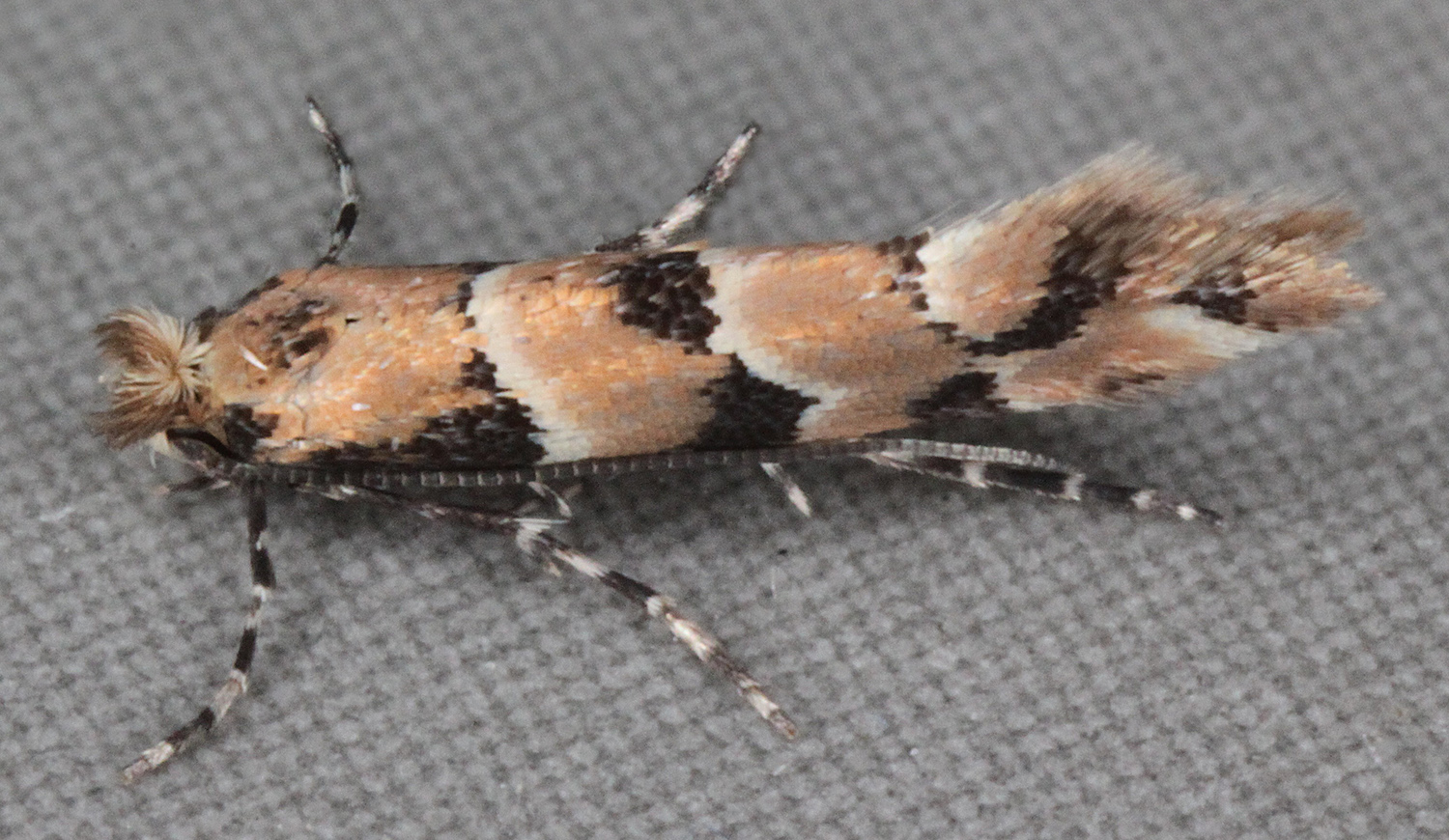
- Phyllonorycter trifasciella, Marl Hall Woods, Llandudno Junction, North Wales, Sept 2009
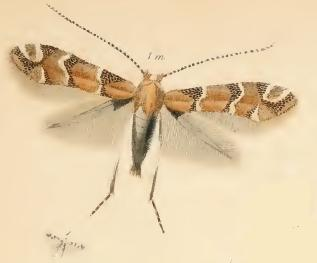

Scientific classification
- Domain: Eukaryota
- Kingdom: Animalia
- Phylum: Arthropoda
- Class: Insecta
- Order: Lepidoptera
- Family: Gracillariidae
- Genus: Phyllonorycter
- Species: P. trifasciella

Binomial name
- Phyllonorycter trifasciella Haworth, 1828

= Phyllonorycter trifasciella =

Species of moth

Phyllonorycter trifasciella is a moth of the family Gracillariidae. It is found in Western Europe.

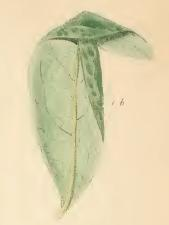
Mined honeysuckle leaf

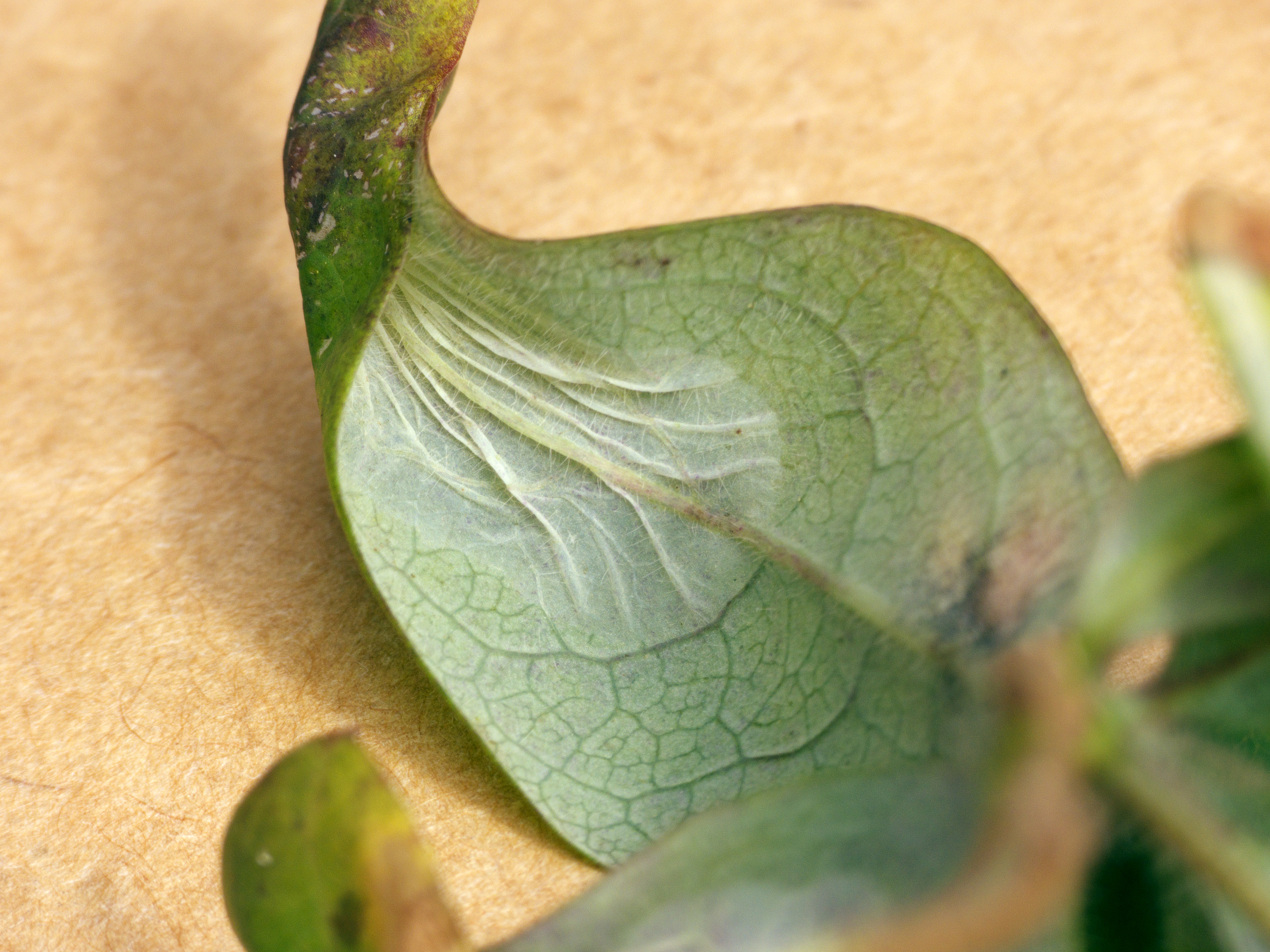
Mined honeysuckle leaf

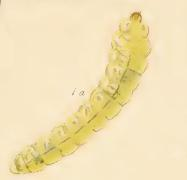
Larva

The wingspan is 7–8 mm. The forewings are pale reddish ochreous; three slender whitish more or less angulated fasciae, margined anteriorly with broad blackish suffusions, broadest towards costa, third sometimes interrupted by a patch of blackish scales extending to tornus; a round blackish apical spot. Hindwings are grey.

The moth flies in three generations, from March–April, July–August and October.

The larvae feed on Lonicera, Symphoricarpos and Leycesteria species.
