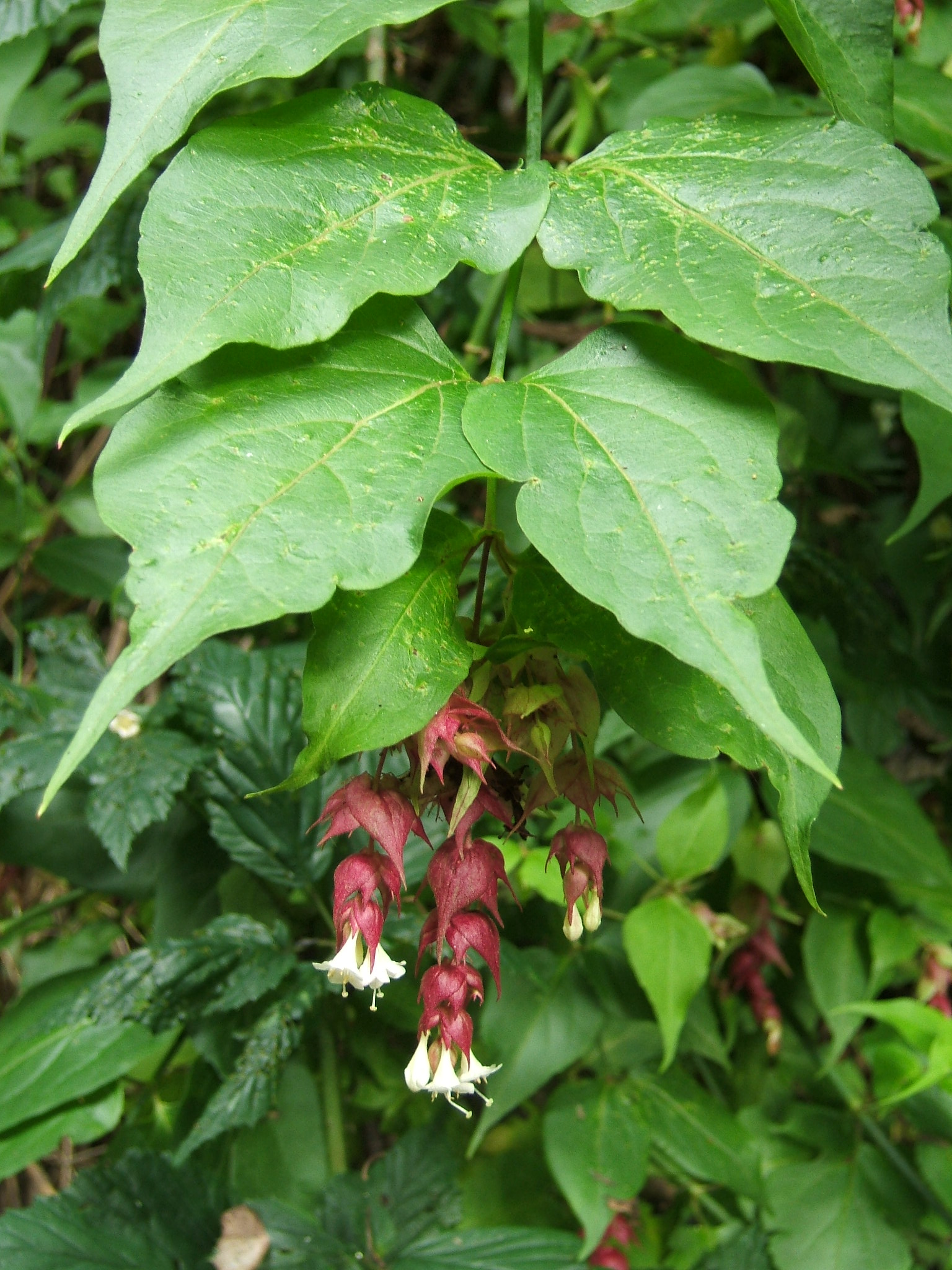

Scientific classification
- Kingdom: Plantae
- Clade: Tracheophytes
- Clade: Angiosperms
- Clade: Eudicots
- Clade: Asterids
- Order: Dipsacales
- Family: Caprifoliaceae
- Genus: Leycesteria
- Species: L. formosa

Binomial name
- Leycesteria formosa Wall.

= Leycesteria formosa =

Species of plant

Leycesteria formosa, the pheasant berry, is a deciduous shrub in the family Caprifoliaceae, native to the Himalayas and southwestern China. It is considered a noxious invasive species in Australia, New Zealand, the neighbouring islands of Micronesia, and some other places.

In the Himalayas, the shrub is frequently used in the traditional medicine of the various countries and peoples encompassed within the region.

== Names ==
The genus name Leycesteria was coined by Nathaniel Wallich (one time director of Royal Botanic Garden, Calcutta) in honour of his friend William Leycester, Chief justice and noted amateur horticulturist, in Bengal in about 1820; while the Latin specific name formosa (feminine form of formosus) signifies 'beautiful' or 'handsome' (literally: 'shapely') – in reference to the curious, pendent inflorescences with their richly wine-coloured bracts. There is a popular misconception, however, that the specific name derives from the place name 'Formosa', which is an abbreviation of the original Portuguese name for the island of Taiwan: Ilha Formosa "beautiful island". Portuguese is a romance language (i.e. derived from Latin) and the adjective formosa has passed into it unchanged in spelling and meaning from the original Latin. Leycesteria formosa is so named in recognition of its beauty, not in acknowledgment of an origin on the island now known as Taiwan. The Latin specific names of certain plants, given to indicate that they were native to Taiwan at a time when it was known as Formosa take such forms as formosae, formosana and formosensis, not the Latin adjective/Portuguese adjective-used-as-a-proper-noun formosa.

Other common names include Himalayan honeysuckle, pheasant-eye, Elisha's tears, flowering nutmeg, spiderwort, Cape fuchsia, whistle stick, Himalaya nutmeg, granny's curls,partridge berry, chocolate berry, shrimp plant/flower and treacle tree/berry It is also recorded as Symphoricarpos rivularis Suksdorf. Contrary to the impression given by the respective common names, the plant is completely unrelated either to the nutmeg tree or to the fuchsia. Further contrary to the name "Cape fuchsia", it is not native to South Africa – the name being especially inappropriate, given that the family Caprifoliaceae as a whole is absent from Sub-Saharan Africa.

Wallich was Danish by birth and perhaps could hardly be expected to forsee that within fifty years or so the name of the worthy Justice [Leycester(ia)] would be corrupted into 'Elisha's tears' – which yet seems strangely to suit the plant, with its pendent white flowers and its persistent bracts which darken to a sombre blood red as the season advances.

Garden Shrubs and their Histories
Alice M. Coats

It is apparent from the above that the common name Elisha's tears falls into the same category (of jocular corruptions of the scientific names of plants into common names more congenial to rural British taste) as Aunt Eliza (for Antholyza) and Sally-my-handsome for Mesembryanthemum. It is also testament to a greater familiarity with the names of biblical figures – such as the Old Testament prophets – on the part of Britons of the nineteenth century, when compared to their counterparts in the twenty-first.

== Affiliation within Caprifoliaceae ==
The results of the genetic testing undertaken by Zhang et al. have revealed that Leycesteria is most closely related to the genera Triosteum (common name – "horse gentians"; Chinese: 莛子藨属; tíng zi biāo shǔ) and Heptacodium (Chinese common name: 七子花; qī zi huā; lit. "seven son flower"). Of these, only Triosteum has fruits that are berries, the fruits of Heptacodium being dry capsules. These three genera belong to the subfamily Caprifolioideae of the honeysuckle family Caprifoliaceae, the other two genera in the subfamily being Lonicera, the (true) honeysuckles and Symphoricarpos, the snowberries.

== Description ==
It is found to be a hardy evergreen, requiring a considerable degree of moisture, and a situation slightly sheltered and shaded, though the colour of its bracts would be most probably be heightened by exposure to solar light. Propagation is effected by cuttings or layers.
Joseph Paxton
Paxton's Magazine of Botany Volume VI (1839)

A deciduous, sometimes evergreen, half-woody, shrub-like plant (intermediate between a shrub and a herbaceous perennial) with young stems that are soft, hollow and upright in various shades of green, salmon pink, maroon and purple, 1–3 m (3 ft 3 in – 9 ft 10 in) in height, which may only last for 2–5 years before collapsing and being replaced by new stems from the roots. Mature specimens, however, may have short, truly woody trunks clothed in rough, grey bark at the base. The leaves are opposite, dark green and usually cordate 6–18 cm (2.4–7.1 in) long and 4–9 cm (1.6–3.5 in) broad, with an entire, wavy or even deeply lobed margin and often an extended drip tip (commonly an adaptation to a wet climate). The flowers (bee-pollinated) are produced on 5–10 cm (2.0–3.9 in) long pendulous racemes; each flower is small, white, pale pink or rarely deep purplish pink, subtended by a purplish-pink bract, terminating – like the leaves – in a drip tip. The fruit is a berry, hard and deep pink when unripe, and fragile, soft (easily burst) and a deep purple-brown when ripe and measuring 1 cm in diameter. The berries are eaten avidly by birds, which disperse the seeds in their droppings.

The berries are unpleasantly bitter when unripe, but, once soft and deep purple-brown in colour, are edible and sweet, having a mild flavour reminiscent of toffee or caramel. Being a recent introduction to Europe, the plant lacks any traditional uses there.

== Distribution ==
L. formosa includes within its wide range of distribution the areas of all the other known species of the genus. From the North-West Frontier Province and the Punjab it ranges the whole length of the Himalaya eastwards to south-eastern Yunnan, where it was collected by Henry near Mengtze, and north-eastwards to Szechuan and eastern Tibet, where Rehder's var. stenosepala appears to replace very largely the typical form.

A Revision of the Genus Leycesteria
— H.K. Airy-Shaw

The species is native to Pakistan, India, Nepal, East and West Himalaya, Southwestern China (Sichuan, Yunnan and Guizhou), Tibet and Myanmar.

== Introduction to the U.K. ==
Coats notes that according to John Claudius Loudon the plant was brought into cultivation in 1824 and flowered soon afterwards in Allen and Rogers's Bolingbroke Nursery in Battersea; and that it was grown at about the same time in the gardens of the Royal Horticultural Society (known at that time as the Horticultural Society of London) from seed procured from India by John Forbes Royle. It proved something of a disappointment to those whose expectations had been raised by a rather highly coloured plate of it in Wallich's Plantae Asiaticae Rariores (1830-2) [see image of said plate in gallery below].

Its leaves are a pale dull green...it has a rambling inelegant mode of growth, and the colour of the bracts is not at all brighter than what is represented in the accompanying plate.
John Lindley
The Botanical Register (1839)

The character of the plant, as developed in an artificial climate, is far from being so good as the accounts of Indian botanists had led us to anticipate. The foliage is large and handsome, and the flowers appear to be produced numerously in terminal pendent racemes; but the most showy feature is the large bracteae at the base of the flowers, which are beautifully veined and tipped with crimson. Dr. Lindley suggests that this latter character may be more prominently exhibited as the plant becomes older, and more inured to our system of cultivation.
Joseph Paxton
Paxton's Magazine of Botany Volume VI (1839)

L. formosa was expected, at the time of its introduction, to be frost-tender in the UK and therefore to need a sunny, South or West-facing aspect, but was soon found to prefer, on the contrary, a cool position, being a plant of dappled woodland shade. Rallying after his initial disappointment, Lindley could concede

If grown in the shade it is most likely to be a beautiful object.

and, a century or so later, Coats could give it similarly mixed praise, prescient in her anticipation of the plant's subsequent classification, in certain other countries, as an invasive weed:

Its hardiness and ease of propagation have led to it being regarded as a background-shrub, and its peculiar merits are rather overlooked. The design of its hanging racemes is unusual and striking.

Leycesteria formosa became a popular plant in Victorian shrubberies, grown because the berries were relished by the pheasants raised as game birds on country estates – whence the English common name pheasant berry. Attempts have been made in recent years to re-popularise the species in Britain, with new cultivated varieties appearing in garden centres.

== Habitat and cultivation ==
In the wild, in the eastern Himalayas and western China, the plant grows in wet, rocky woods and on cliffs, its predeliction for the latter habitat explaining its success in colonising walls – effectively artificial cliffs. The plant was included in a list of species observed to be resistant to gross atmospheric pollution (smoke and other particulates) compiled in the late 19th century. It is equally resistant to modern atmospheric pollution and will tolerate windy sites and the salty air of coastal localities. Furthermore, deer will not browse upon it. It is often found naturalised in the wild in southern England. In Ireland it is found in roadsides, planted wooded areas, and riverbanks.

== Medicinal uses ==
L. formosa is a frequently used medicinal plant in Southwest China, where it bears the common name Yi Yao. The Yi people (known also as Nuoso and Lolo) of Sichuan province use the tender shoots of the plant in their system of traditional medicine to treat measles. The Yi (speakers of various Loloish languages of Burmese affiliation) are notable for their rich cultural heritage, having retained their ancient shamanic faith of Bimoism, which incorporates a traditional body of ethnomedicinal knowledge. Furthermore the Yi are fortunate in not having to rely solely upon oral tradition, possessing as they do written records in their own Yi script, dating back at least to the end of the fifteenth century and – according to tradition – even farther back to the time of the Tang dynasty.

In the Poonch region of Azad Kashmir (Pakistan) a paste of the leaves (or a leaf extract) of L. formosa (known locally under the name of Jummar) is used as a hair tonic to rid the hair of dandruff and lice and the same use has been recorded in the Kedarnath Wildlife Sanctuary of the Garhwal Himalaya range of Uttarakhand province, India. A common name for the plant in 'Chamoli' (= Garhwali), spoken in Uttarakhand, is Bhenkew.

The Monpa people of Mêdog County, Southeast Tibet use unspecified plant parts of L. formosa (known locally by the common name pya-min-mon) to stem blood loss in cases of traumatic bleeding. Shan et al. append to their paper on the ethnobotany of the Monpa a table comparing Monpa plant use for a given species with the reported phytochemical/pharmacological properties of that species as reported in Chinese academic literature and note a good match in the case of L. formosa, although they note further that the plant has been reported elsewhere in China to be used not only to arrest bleeding but also in the treatment of bone fractures.

Coats gives the common name of the shrub in Nepal as nulkuroo but does not state the language of that country from which it derives (it is not Nepali). The Khaling people of the subtropical lowlands of Solukhumbu district, Nepal use unspecified plant parts of L. formosa as an anthelminthic. In his paper on Khaling plant names, Japanese missionary and ethnographer Sueyoshi Toba lists the Khaling name for the plant as ‘dӕnciki and the Nepali name as paDpaDe, describing the plant itself as 'an aromatic shrub, which sometimes takes parasitic form'. This description is curious on two counts, for Leycesteria formosa – at any rate when grown as an ornamental shrub in Europe – is neither notably aromatic nor a parasite, lacking as it does haustoria to tap nutrients from a host plant. The latter point, at least, may be explicable by Toba having observed (or heard described by a Khaling informant) L. formosa growing epiphytically upon a tree in a deposit of humus. The plant is certainly often to be observed growing as a lithophyte – specifically a chasmophyte – in a minimal substrate, e.g. from bird droppings deposited in rock crevices or in cracks in the mortar of old walls. Indeed the plant has been observed growing as a (non-native) epiphyte on the tree fern Dicksonia squarrosa in a survey conducted recently in New Zealand.

=== Traditional Chinese medicine ===
In Standard Chinese L. formosa is best-known under the common name 鬼吹簫 (Guĭ chuī xiāo) – approximate pronunciation "gwé chwé siaaow" – meaning ghost flute (literally ghost-blown flute) / "xiao of the spirits", although Zhang et al. list also (in translation only) other common names rendered as "gun barrel", "hollow wood", "wild lupine" and the more cryptic "golden chicken lock". In the semi-humoral system of Traditional Chinese medicine, as practised in southwest China, the plant is believed to remove excess "dampness" (湿; shī) and "heat" (火; huǒ), to promote blood circulation and to stop bleeding. It is also used to treat (among other diseases/disease concepts) "damp heat jaundice" (referable possibly to hepatitis), arthritic pain (notably that caused by rheumatoid arthritis), asthma, irregular menstruation, cystitis and bone fracture. L. formosa is regarded in China as the pre-eminent medicinal species of its genus and has been used there as such for millennia.

=== 'Ghost flute' and other Chinese common names ===
The shrub acquired its picturesque folkloric name of ghost flute (and also that of 鬼竹子 or Guǐ zhúzi: ghost bamboo) in reference to the eerie piping sounds produced by the broken, hollow stems of the plant when blown upon by the wind.

Nowadays in the city, the street lights are so bright, even late at night, but it wasn't like that in the countryside when I was a lad. Moonlit nights weren't so bad, but, when you were out walking and there was no moon, it'd be pitch black and you'd start to imagine all sorts of things... When I was a child and I and a few friends would be walking along beside these bushes, they'd make the sound of a flute: I would always think that there really was someone playing the flute, but then I'd look around and there'd be no one there. I'd suddenly feel a bit scared and run away. It got to the point where I'd avoid going near the place where those plants grew: If I so much as caught a glimpse of one, I'd beat a hasty retreat. Maybe, in ancient times, people felt the same way and that's why they gave it the name 'ghost flute', although I expect the herb-gatherers at that time were fond of it and didn't let the sound bother them, because they knew that it was such a good medicinal plant. Later, of course, when I grew up and worked out how the plant made the sound, I realised that there was no reason to be afraid of it any more... it's the stems that make the sound, you see - because they're hollow. If the weather's right and you get a good breeze, you'll hear that rich, melodious sound, just like the blowing of a lot of flutes. and – what with all those pretty little bell flowers dancing around in the wind as well – you'd think the ghosts were blowing on them too...

In addition to the above, L. formosa has acquired a wealth of common names in the Chinese language, including:

- 风吹箫 (Fēng chuī xiāo): Wind(-blown) flute
- 夜吹箫 (Yè chuī xiāo): Night(-blowing) flute
- 大追风 (Dà zhuī fēng): Big chase wind
- 炮筒花 (Pào tǒng huā): Gun barrel flower
- 炮竹筒 (Pào zhútǒng): Firecracker (Pào 'gun' + zhútǒng 'bamboo tube')
- 炮仗筒 (Pàozhang tǒng): Firecracker (Pàozhang 'gun battle' + tǒng 'tube')
- 火炮花 (Huǒpào huā): Artillery flower
- 金鸡一把锁 (Jīnjī yī bǎ suǒ): Golden rooster lock
- 空心木 (Kōngxīn mù): Hollow wood
- 空心草 (Kōngxīn cǎo): Hollow grass
- 大笔杆草 (Dà bǐgǎn cǎo): Big pen grass/Big-stalked grass
- 来色木 (Lái shǎi mù): (Come) colour wood
- 大木比替力 (Dà mù bǐ tì lì): Big wood that is a substitute for strength
- 鬼竹子 (Guǐ zhúzi): Ghost bamboo
- 梅叶竹 (Méi yè zhú): Plum-leaved bamboo
- 野芦柴 (Yě Lú chái): Wild reed firewood
- 磨倮子 (Mó luǒ zi): Grinding naked seed
- 猴橘子 (Hóu júzi): Monkey orange

These names refer mostly to the tubular (fistular) form of the stems, their similarity to those of bamboos and their suitability for wind instruments – as suggested by their natural tendency to whistle eerily in the wind. Those referring to (again, tubular) guns and fireworks indicate that the jointed stems of the plant explode (crack / pop) when burnt, like those of bamboo (the popping stems of which the first fireworks were manufactured to mimic). Only one common name (Hóu júzi, 'Monkey orange') references the shrub's edible berries, and does so in a somewhat disparaging manner. The curious name Jīnjī yī bǎ suǒ, translating as 'Golden rooster lock', suggests that the plant was thought to relate in some way to the good luck / wealth-bringing symbol of the golden cockerel.

== Other uses ==
The hollow canes produced by L. formosa have been used in India to make whistles and flutes. Other uses of the plant in North India (states Assam, Himachal Pradesh, Jammu and Kashmir (union territory), Ladakh and Sikkim) are as a green manure and as firewood.

== Animal toxicity ==
While many sources assert that L. formosa is not toxic, there have been associated deaths of cattle reported in New Zealand and Australia, where the plant is a rampant weed, and thus the plant is best considered suspect until more conclusive evidence comes to light. Leaves and unripe berries are likely to have been the plant parts browsed. Though this plant is often confused with Tutu a plant with poisonous seeds in Aotearoa, this plant shares an almost identical habitat, leaf shape, hollow stems, and a deep connection with traditional health practices called rongoā.

== Chemistry ==
Leycesteria formosa has yielded coumarins, monomeric flavonoids and the two biflavonoid compounds amentoflavone (3'–8" biapigenin) and its 4"'methyl derivative podocarpusflavone A. Amentoflavone and, to some extent, podocarpusflavone A are good cAMP phosphodiesterase-4 inhibitors. In the light of these findings L. formosa may be considered of potential interest in the treatment of dermatitis. Prior to the isolation of amentoflavone from Leycesteria, the only genera of Caprifoliaceae in which the compound was known to occur were Viburnum and Lonicera. (Note: the genus Viburnum is now placed, not in Caprifoliaceae, but in the related family Viburnaceae). The leaves of L. formosa have been found to contain leucoanthocyanins, while the wood contains the fluorescent lactone aesculetin.

== Gallery ==
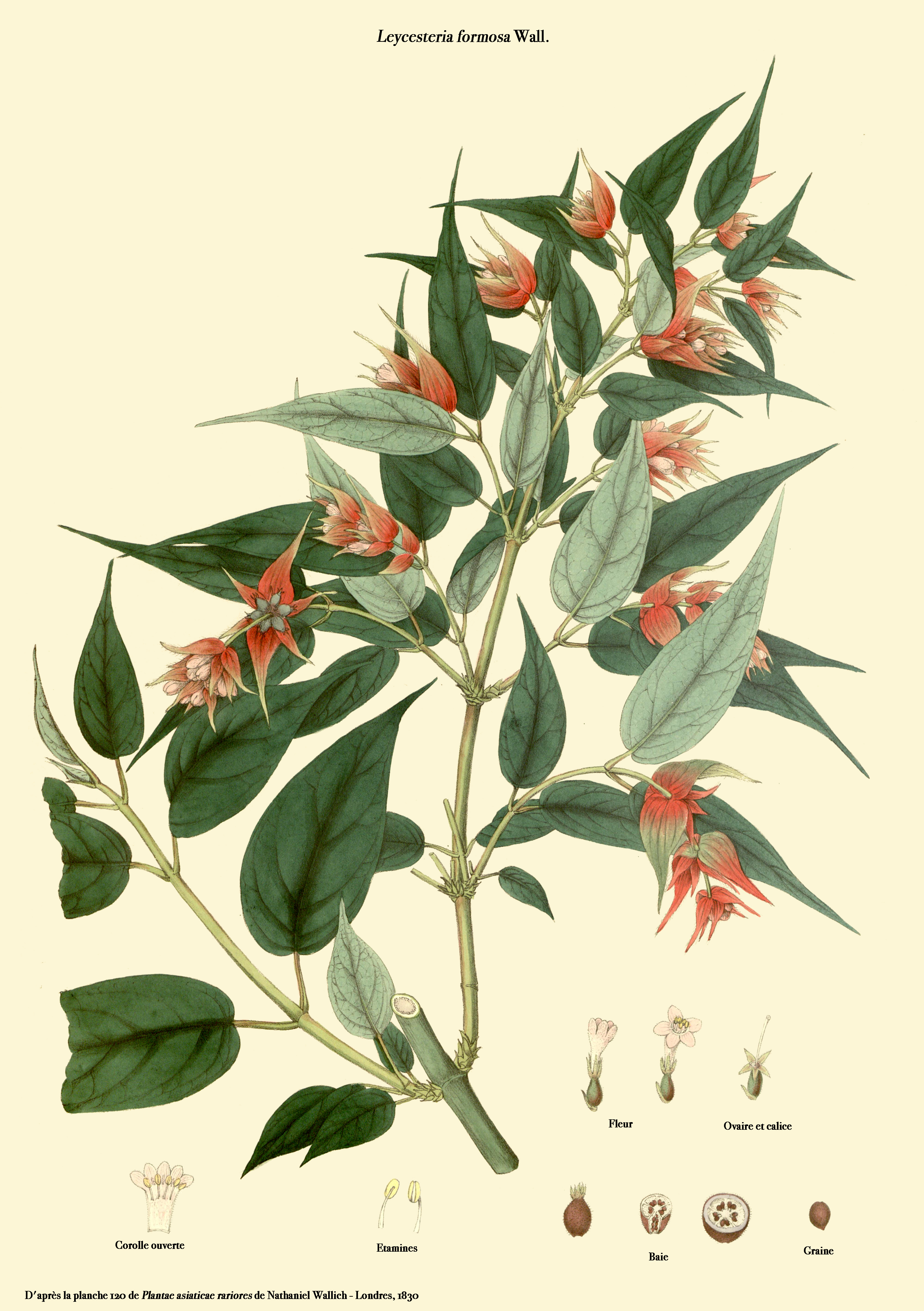
The misleadingly "highly coloured" plate 120 from Nathaniel Wallich's Plantae asiaticae rariores, published London 1830

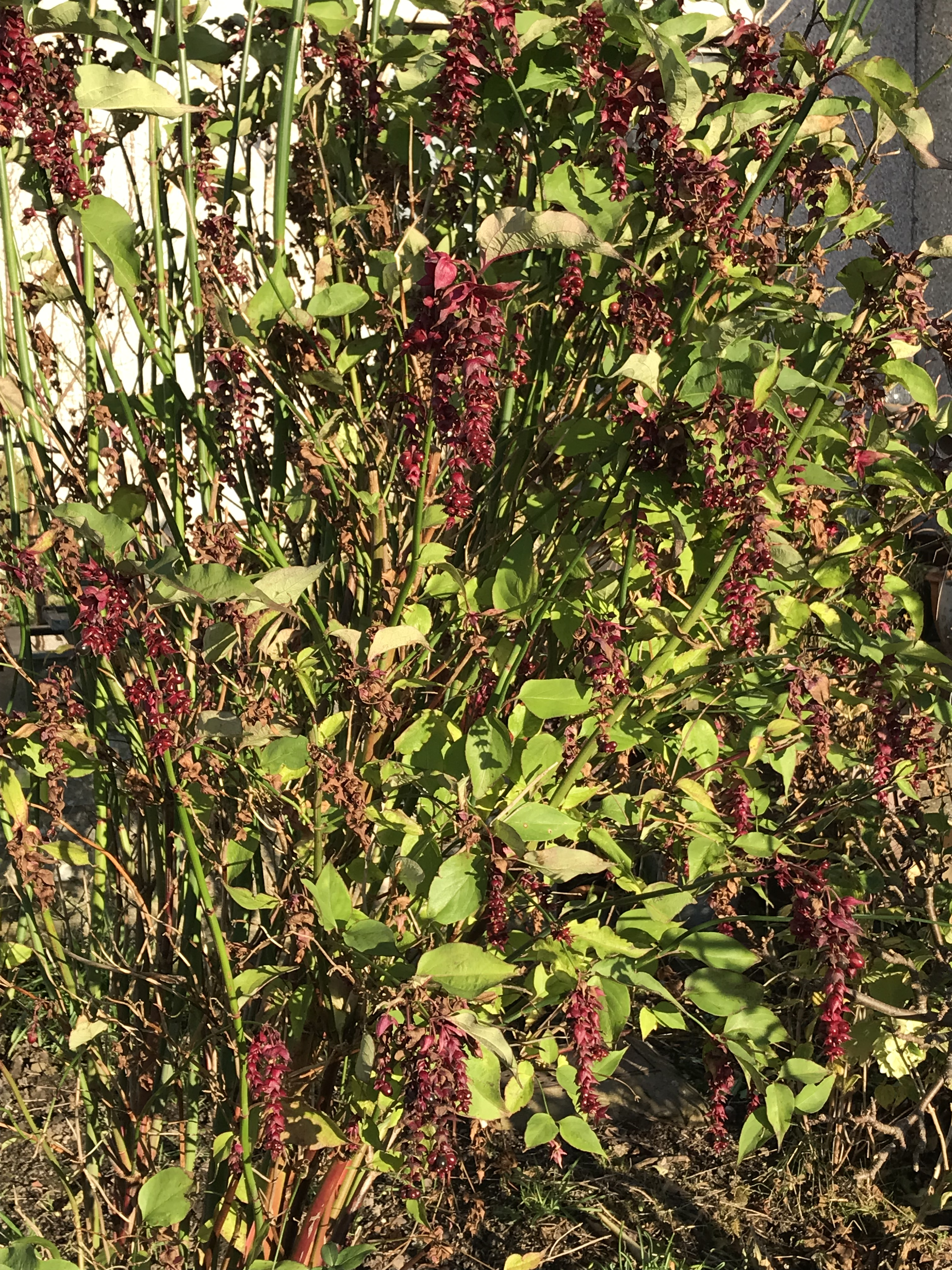
Cultivated plant in leaf and fruit in November, Paxton, Scottish Borders

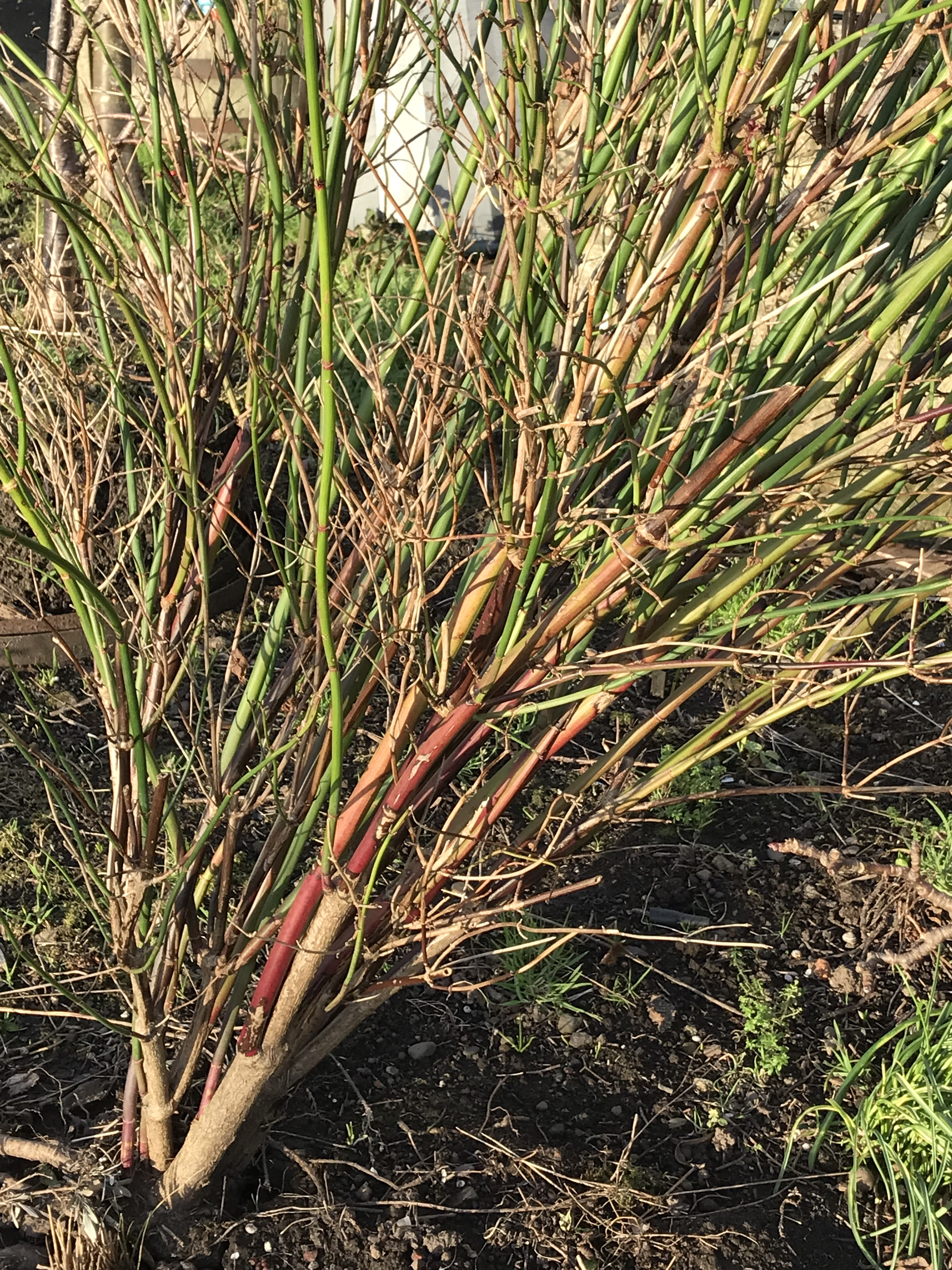
Same specimen defoliated and stripped of fruit by 110 mph winds of Storm Arwen, revealing colourful, bamboo-like stems

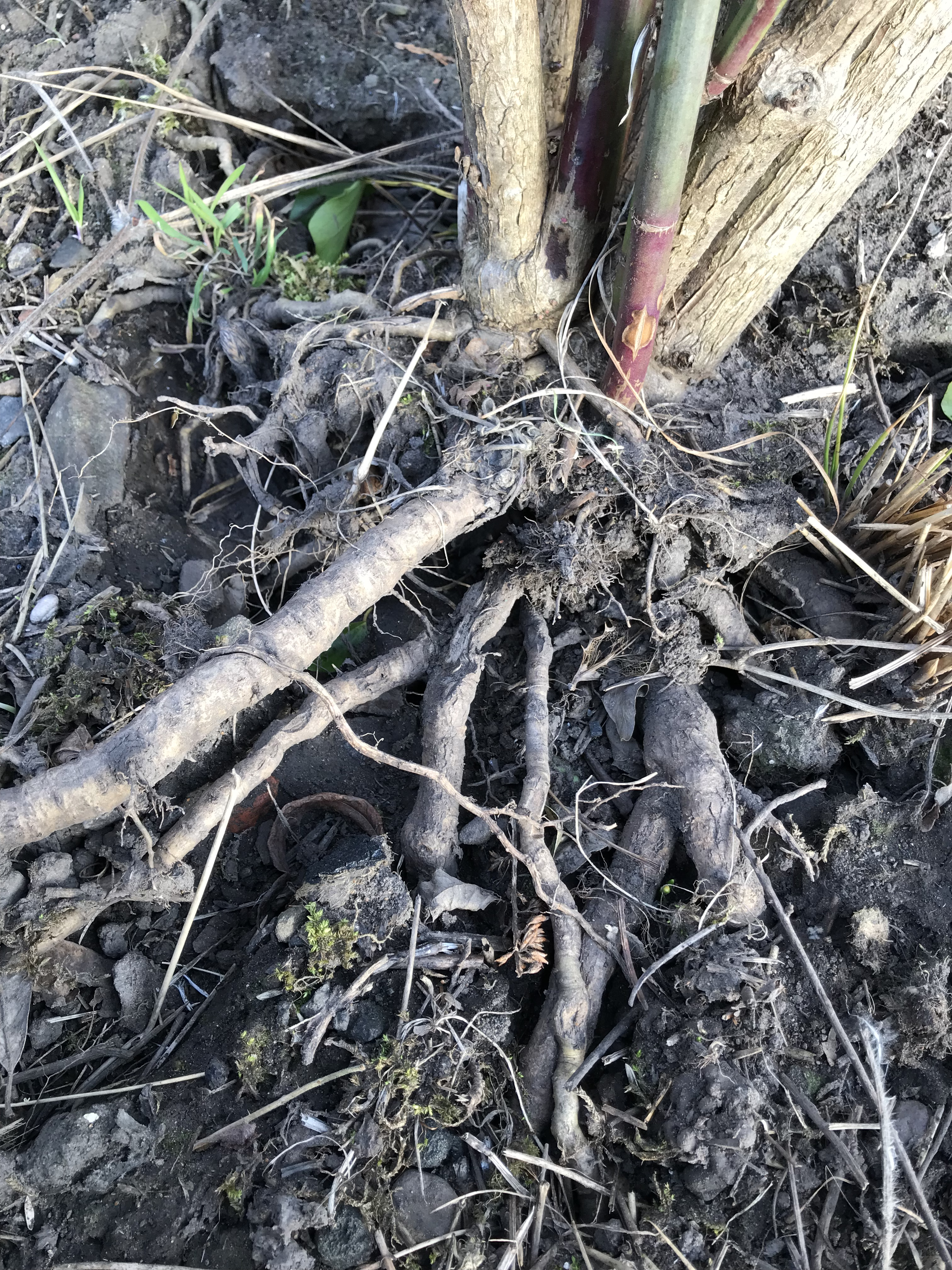
Roots of same specimen, exposed by wind-rock

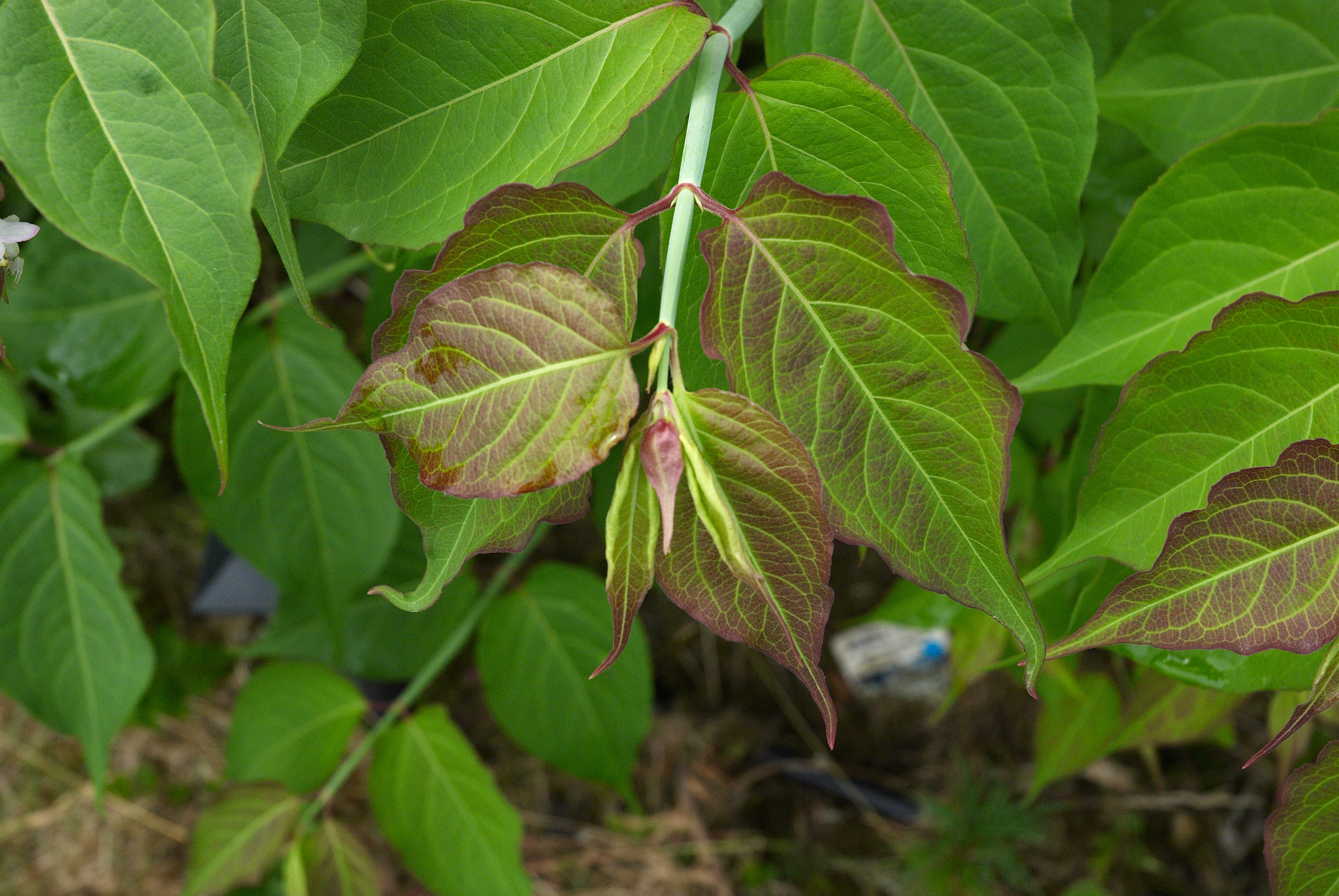
Purple-tinted foliage of young shoot

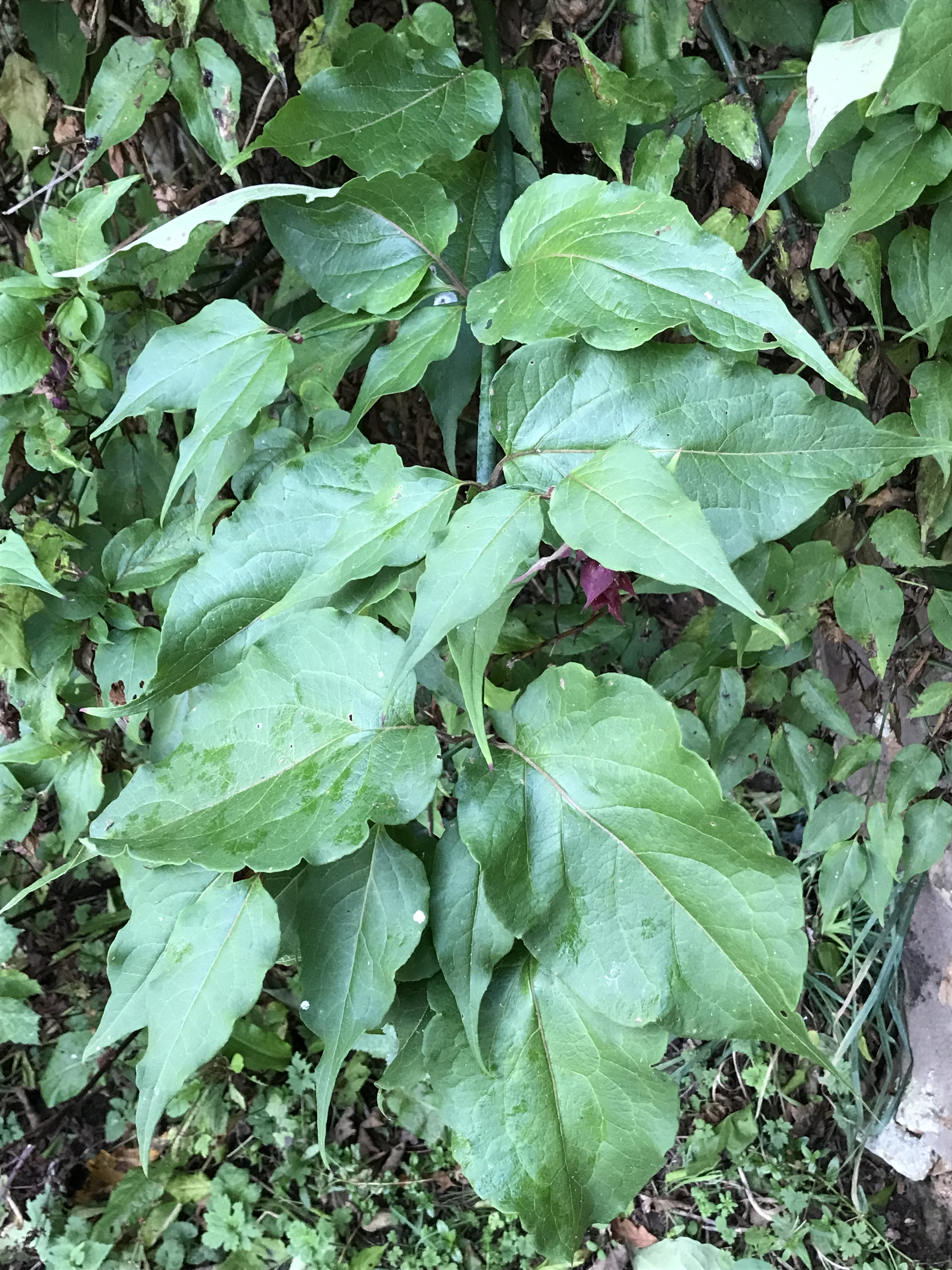
Mature foliage in autumn, showing characteristic drip tips (adaptation to wet climate where species evolved)

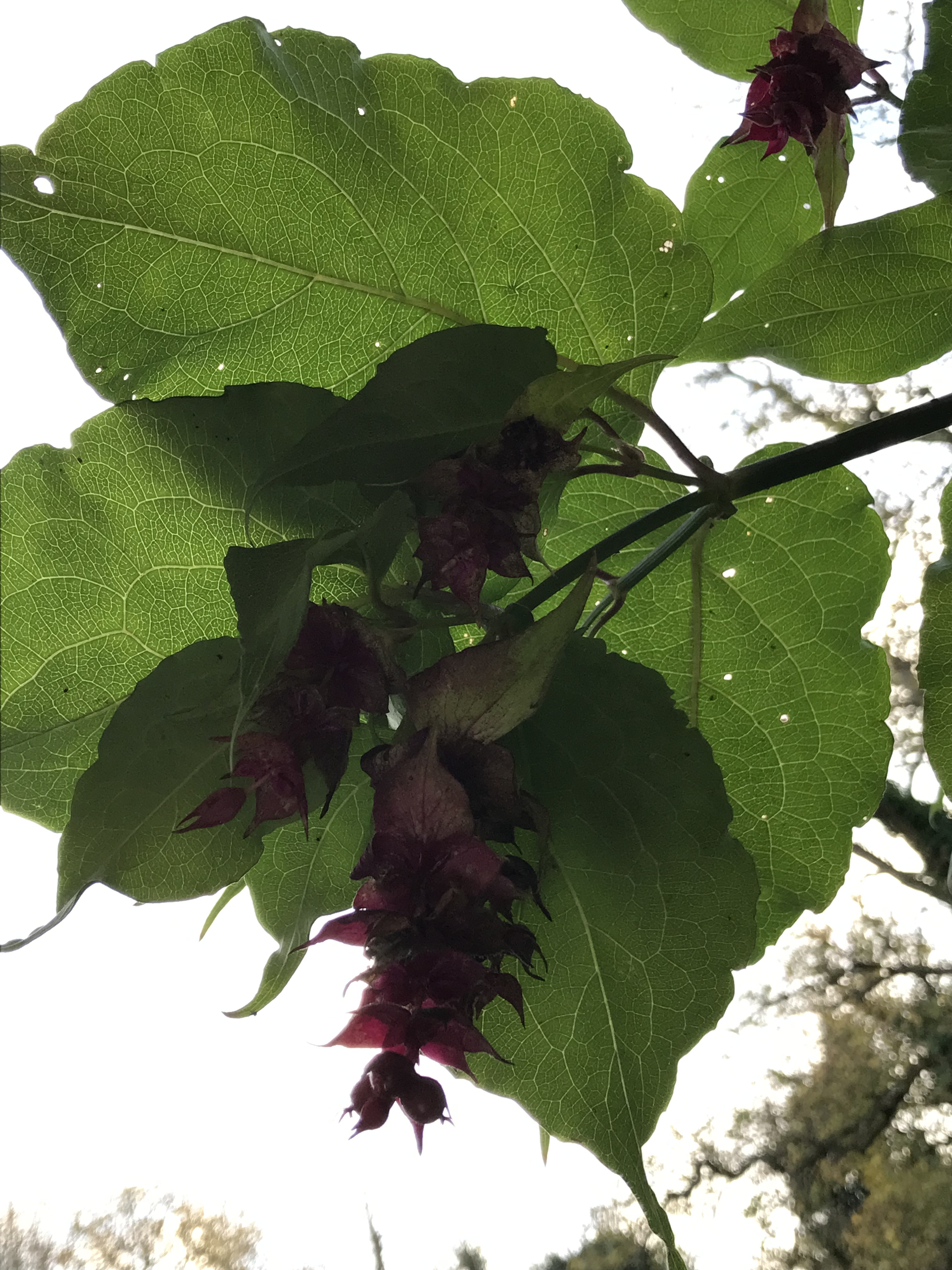
Foliage of fruiting shoot viewed from beneath, back-lit by sunlight to reveal leaf venation

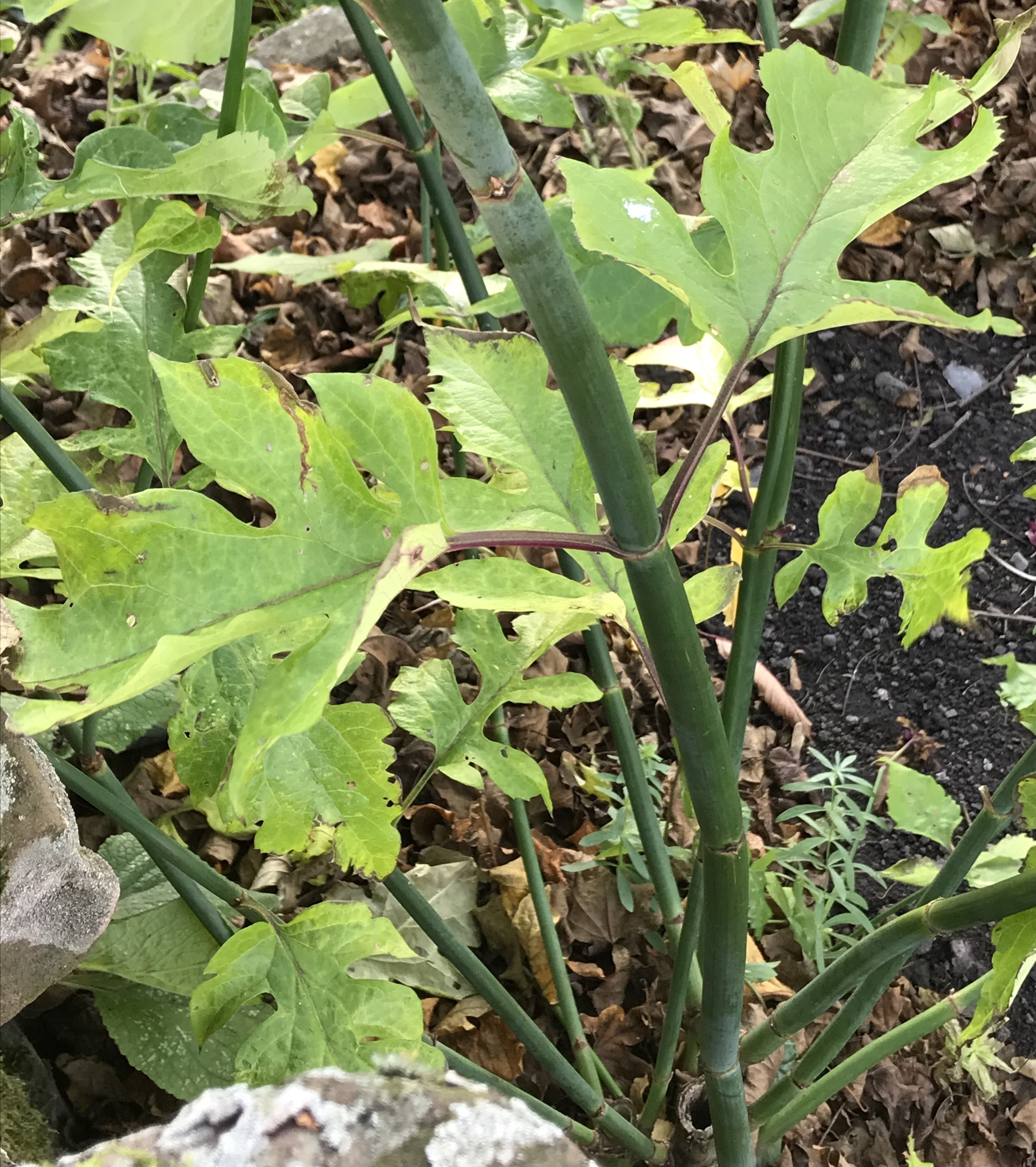
Young plant bearing unusually deeply lobed leaves, Paxton, Scottish Borders

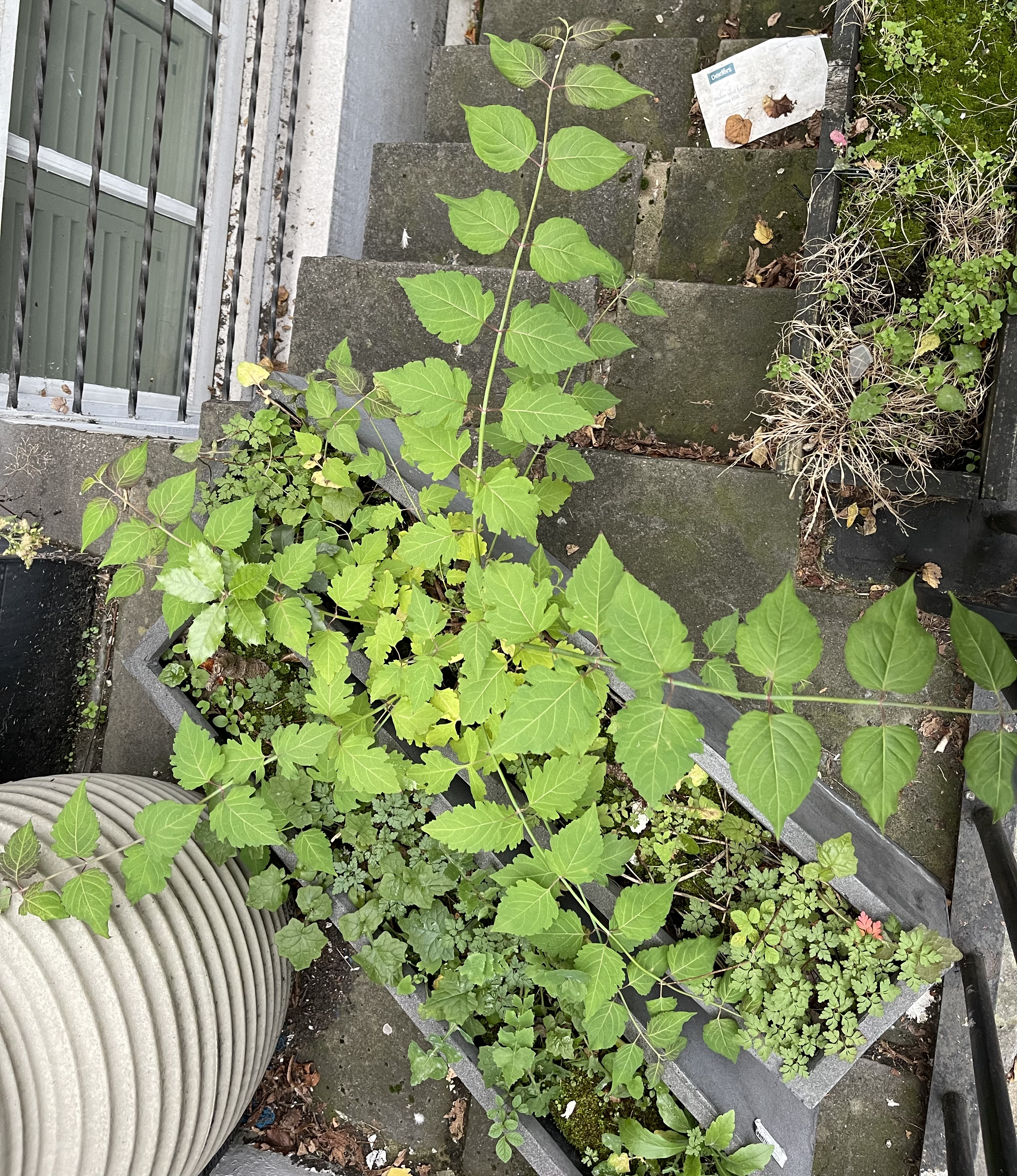
Young plant with dentate-to-finely-lobed foliage, growing as window box weed, in London's Notting Hill Gate

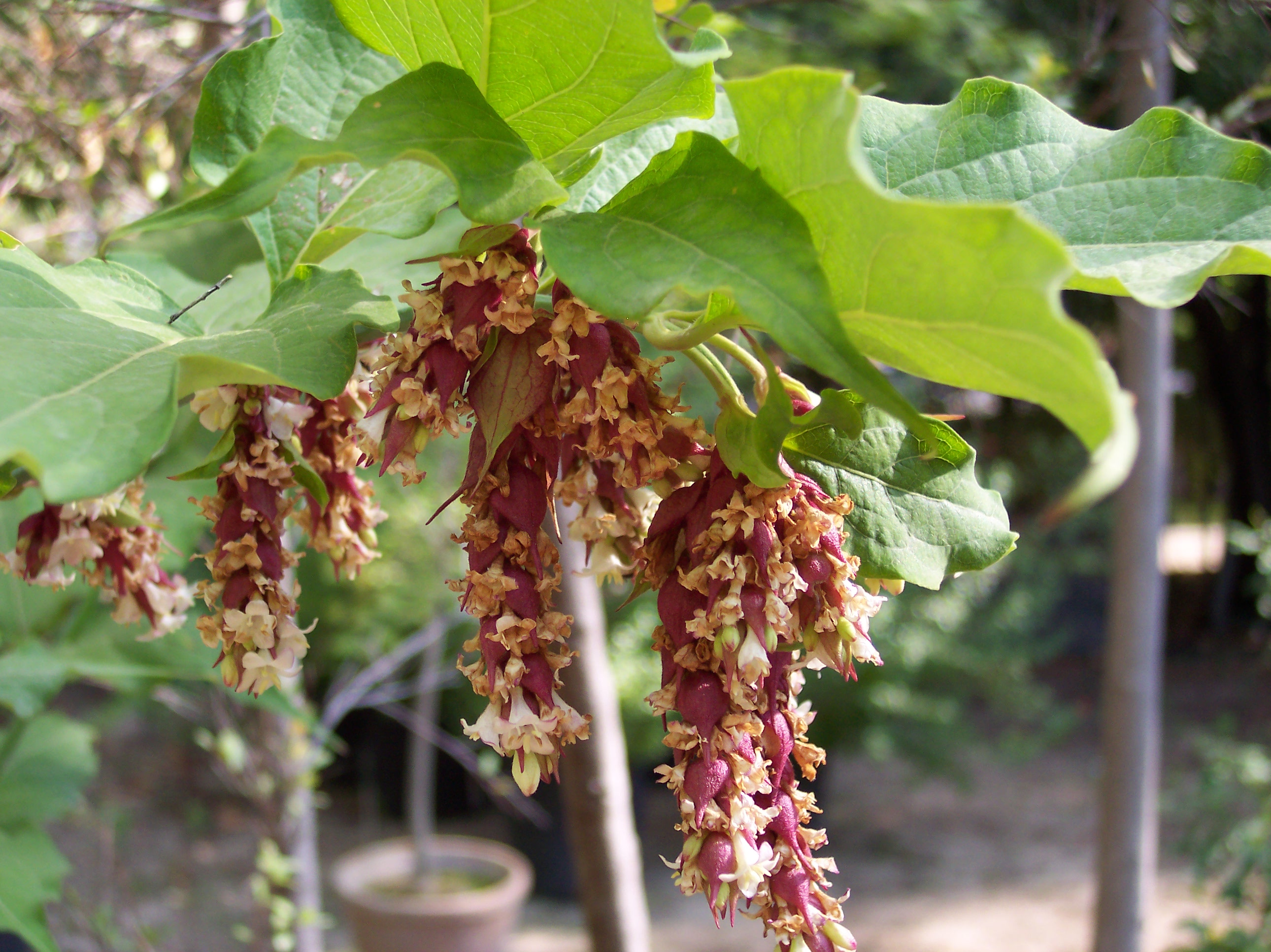
Pendulous flower racemes of specimen in Real Jardín Botánico de Madrid

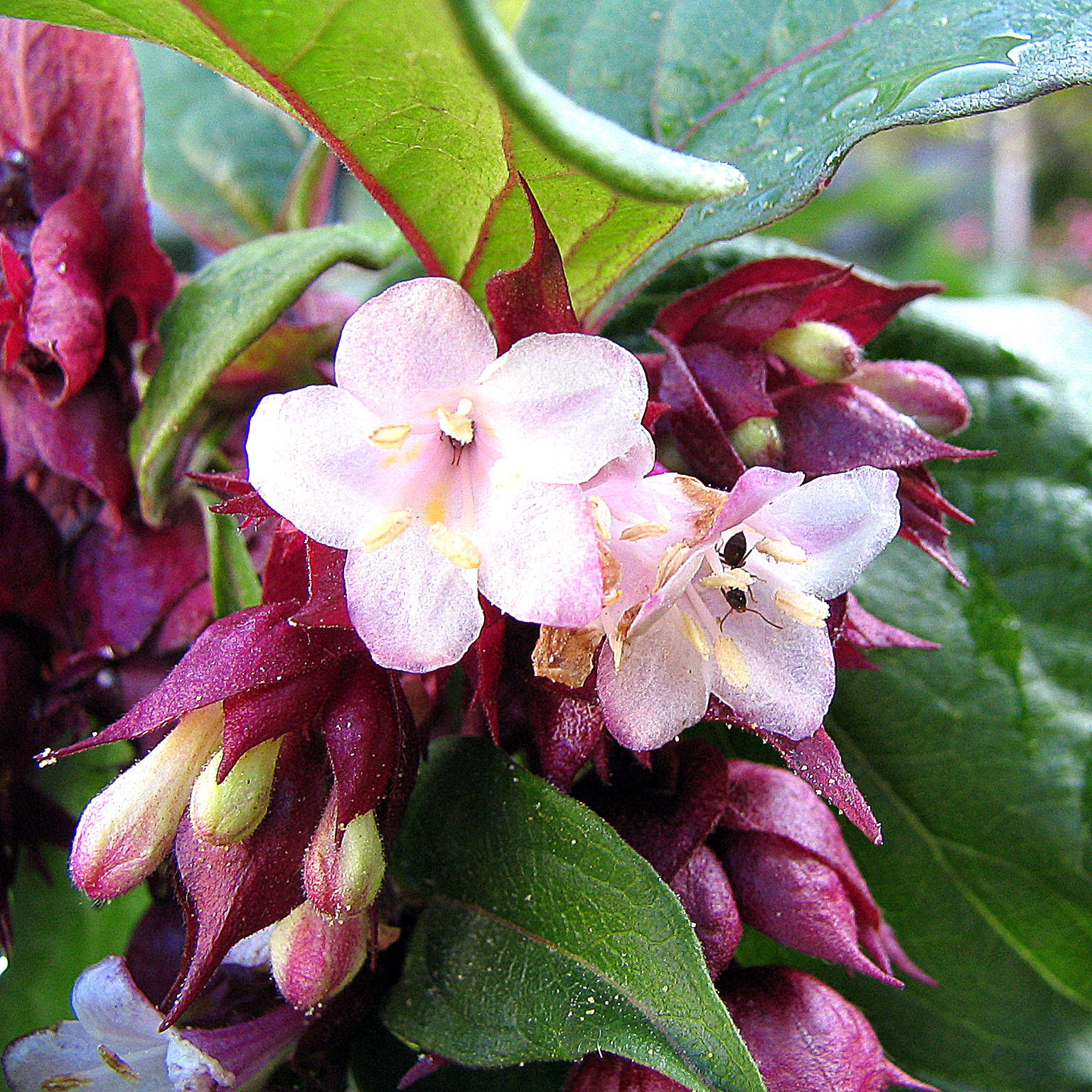
Close-up of flowers of pink-flowered form, cultivated plant, Serbia

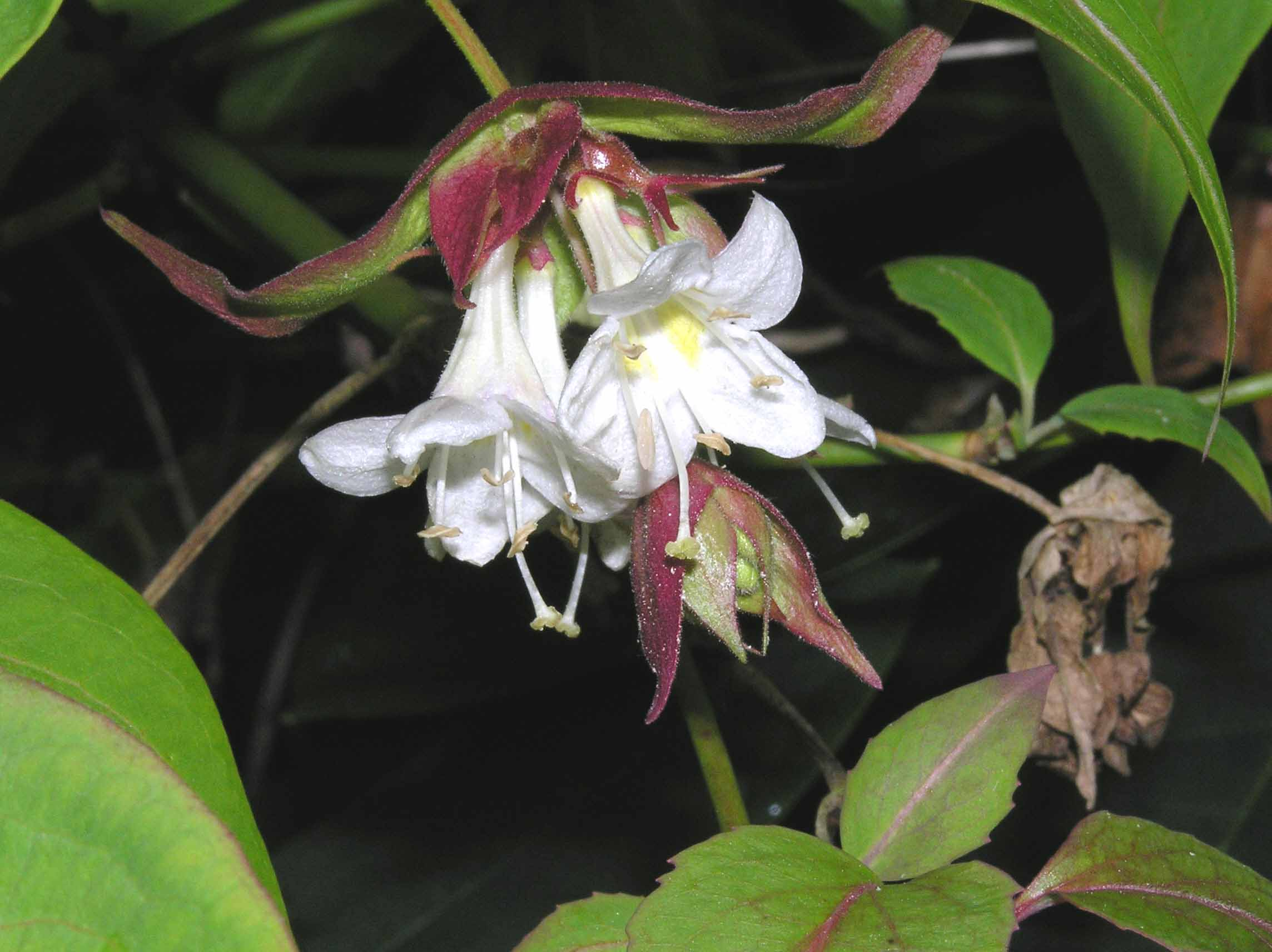
Close-up of flowers of white-flowered form, Woking, Surrey

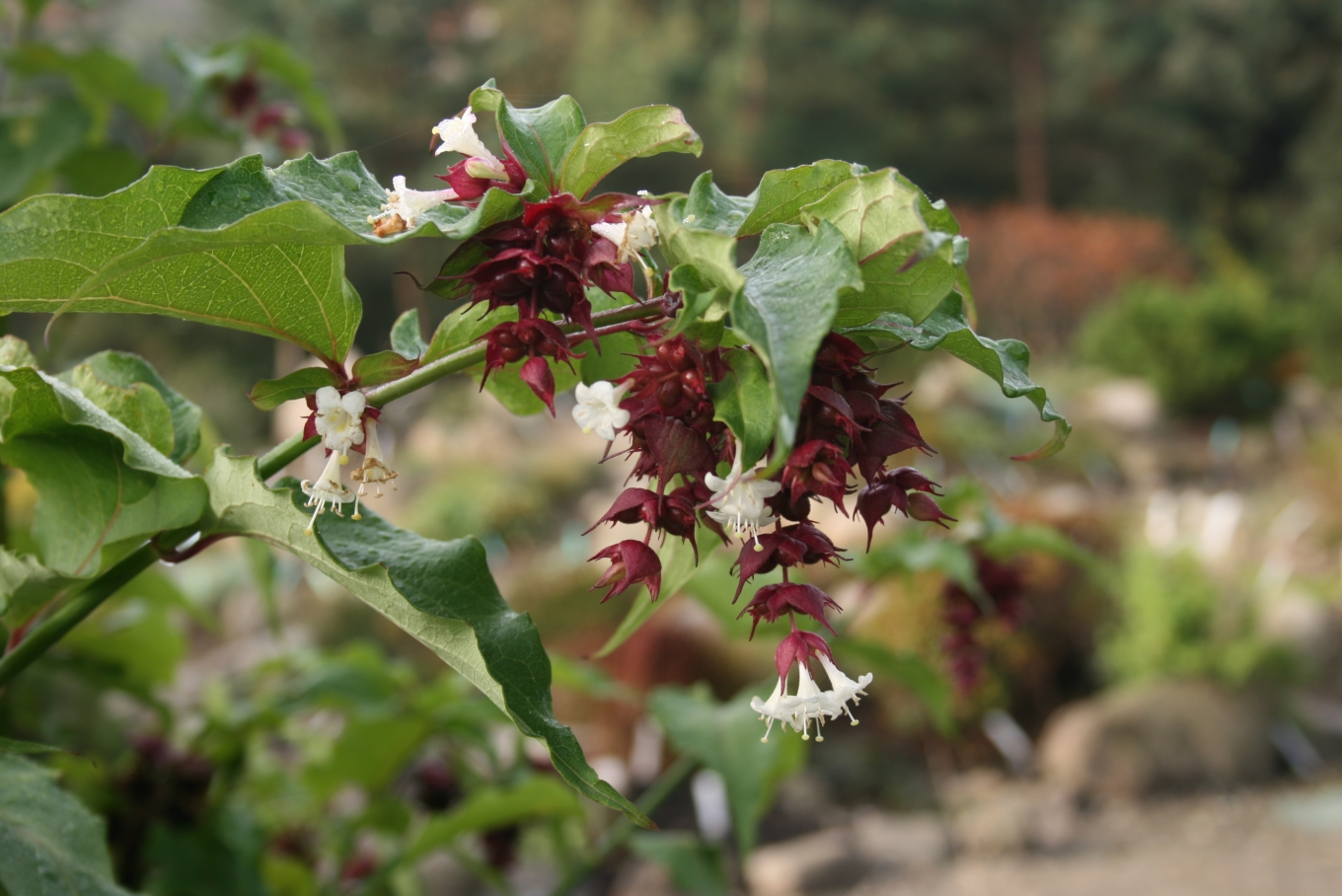
White-flowered form in flower and fruit, Aarhus Botanical Gardens

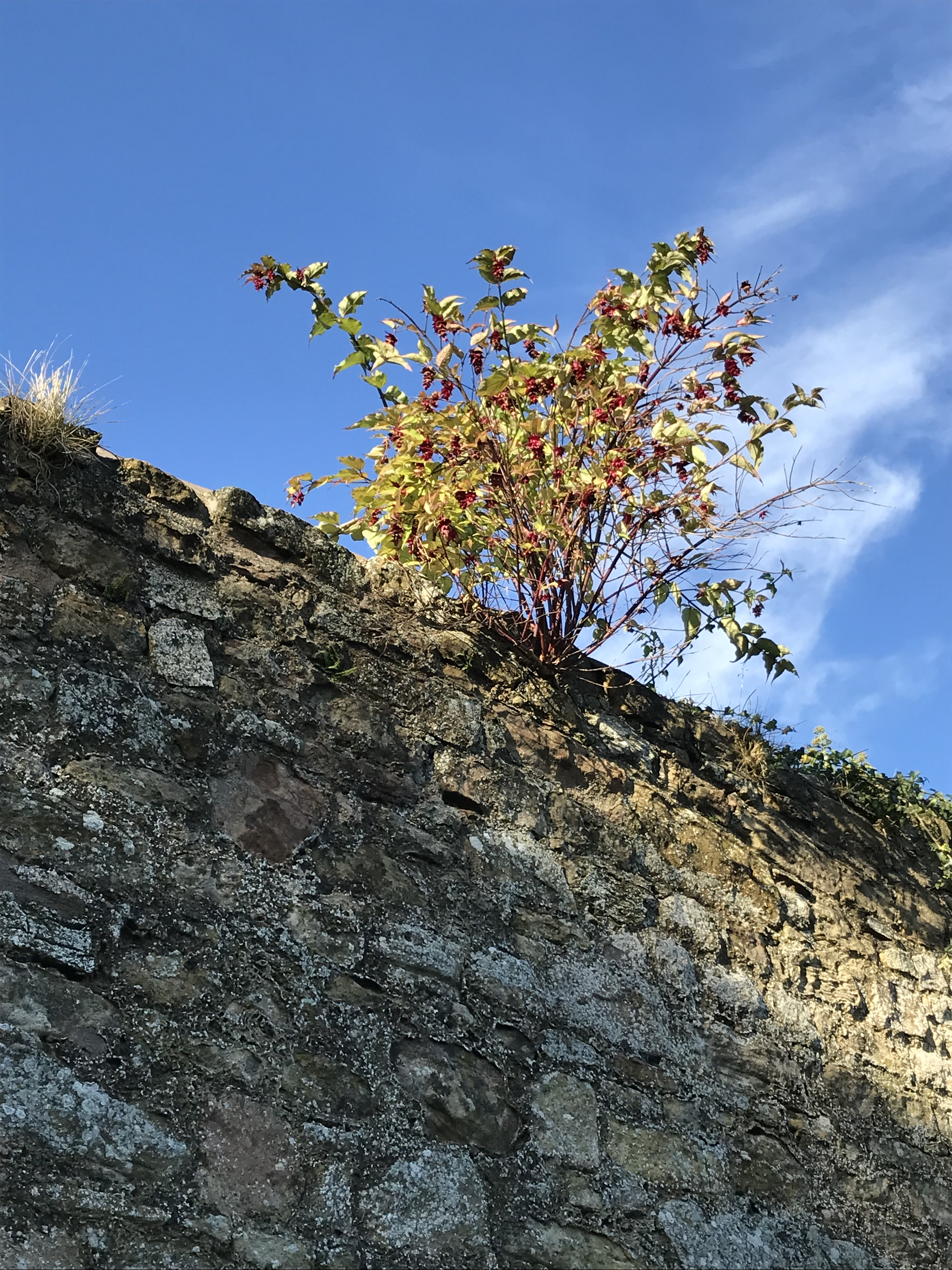
Plant (dwarfed by limited root system) seeded on garden wall in bird droppings and growing as a lithophyte

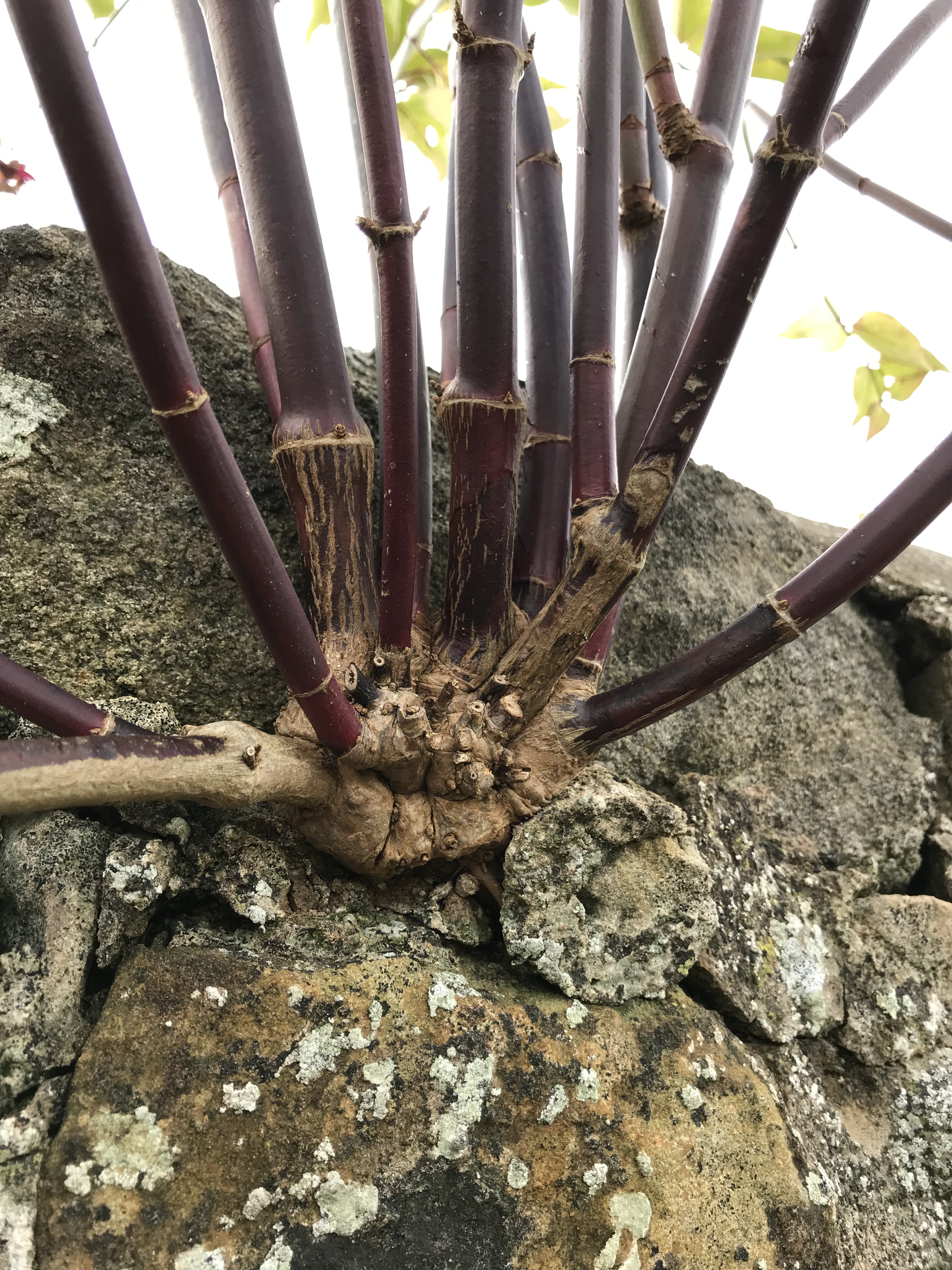
Close-up of base of dwarf specimen on wall, showing puffy, gnarled rootstock (possibly a type of lignotuber)

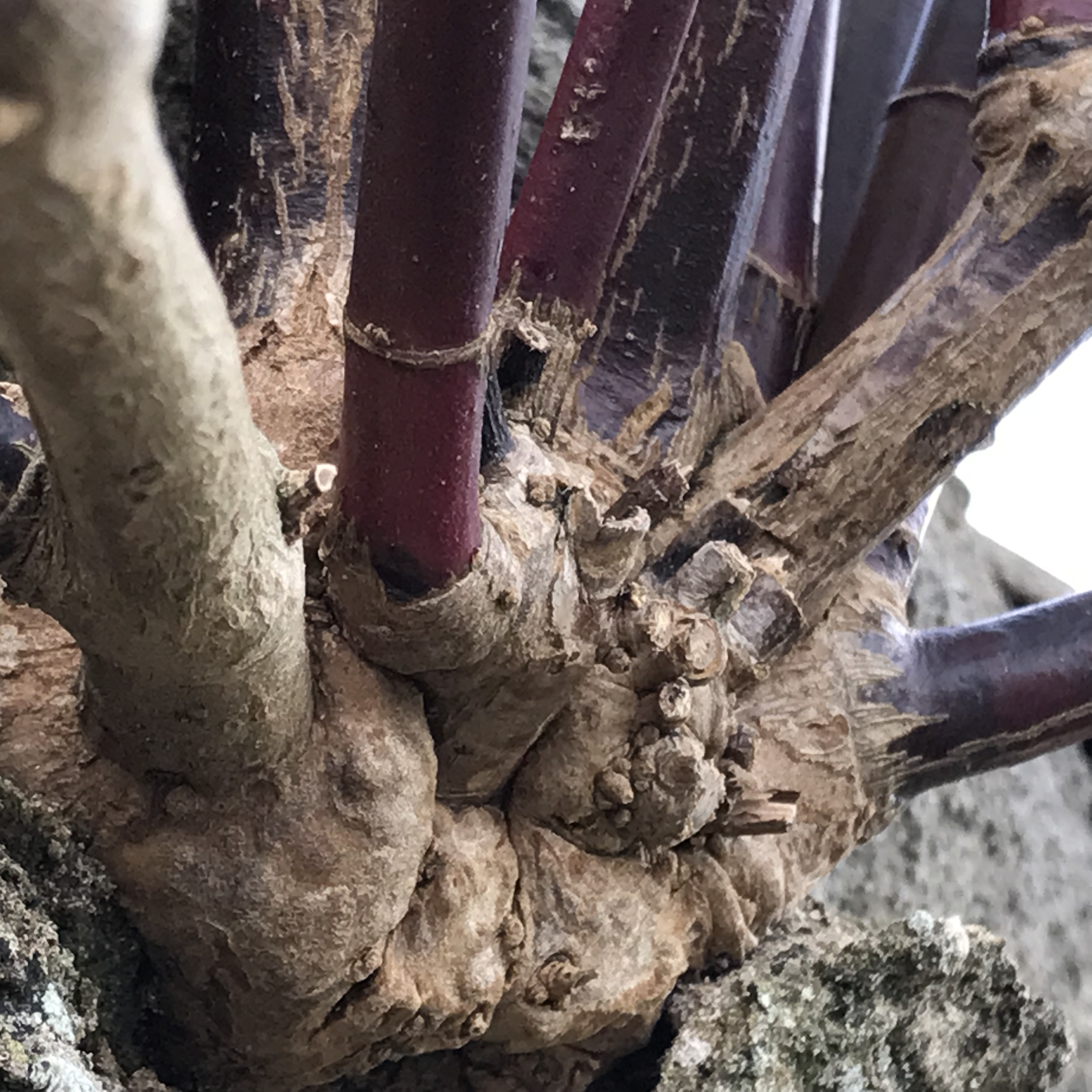
Close-up of lignotuber of specimen growing chasmophytically on wall

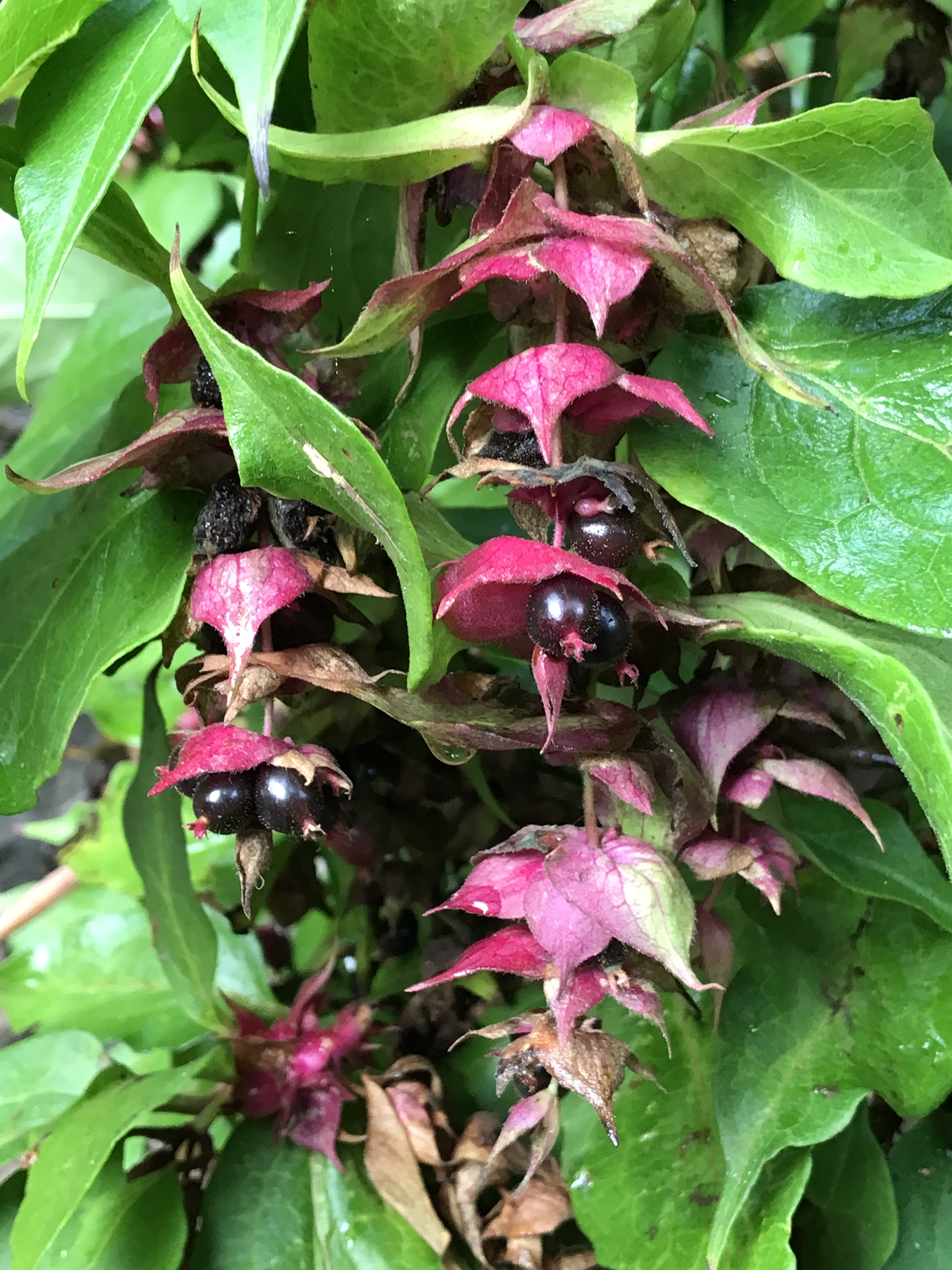
Pendent clusters of ripe fruit subtended by pink bracts, Berrington, Northumberland

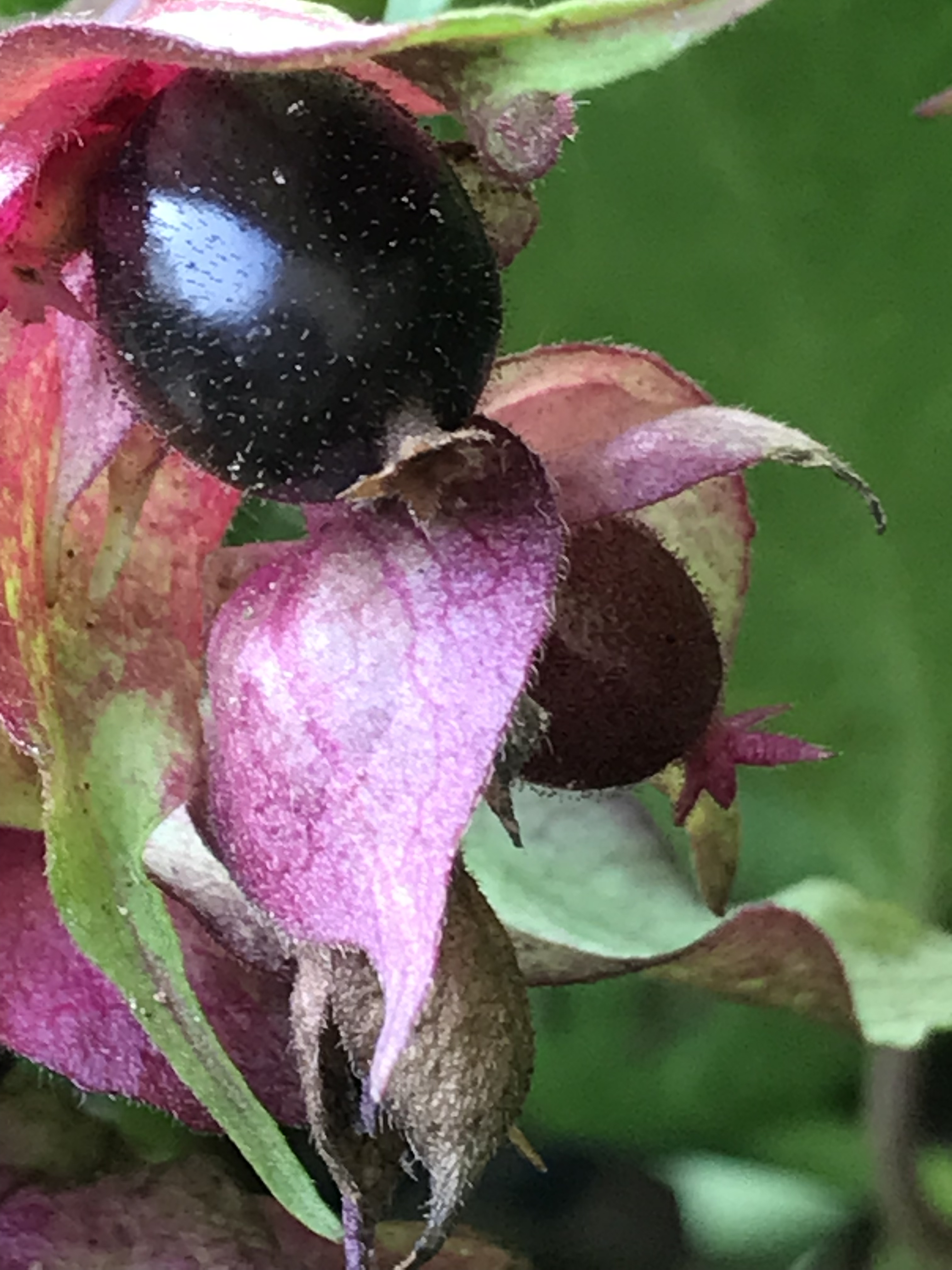
Close-up of two ripe, edible berries, showing bracts, hairy skins and persistent calyces

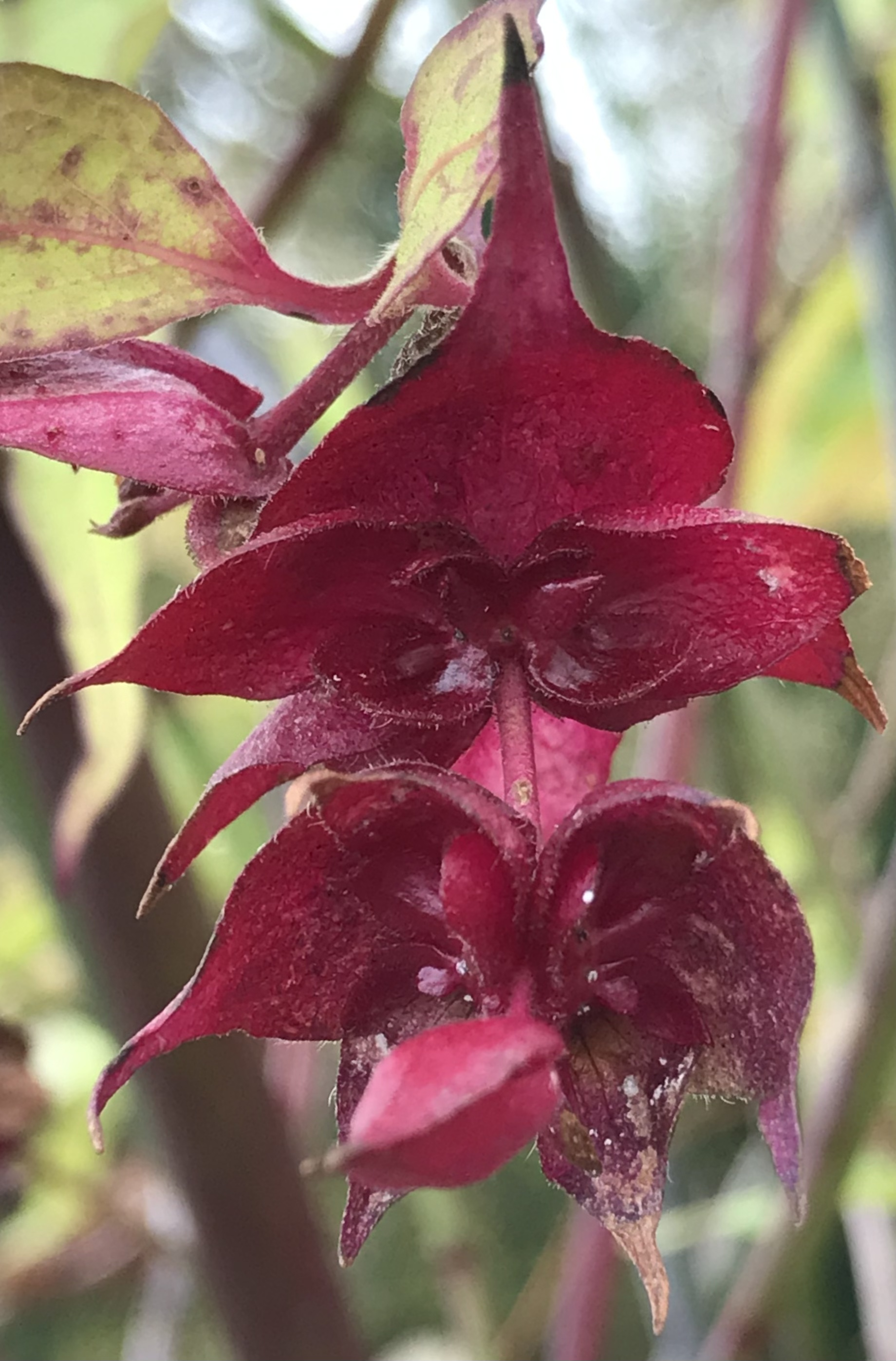
Colourful bracts of an infructescence stripped bare of fruit by birds and squirrels

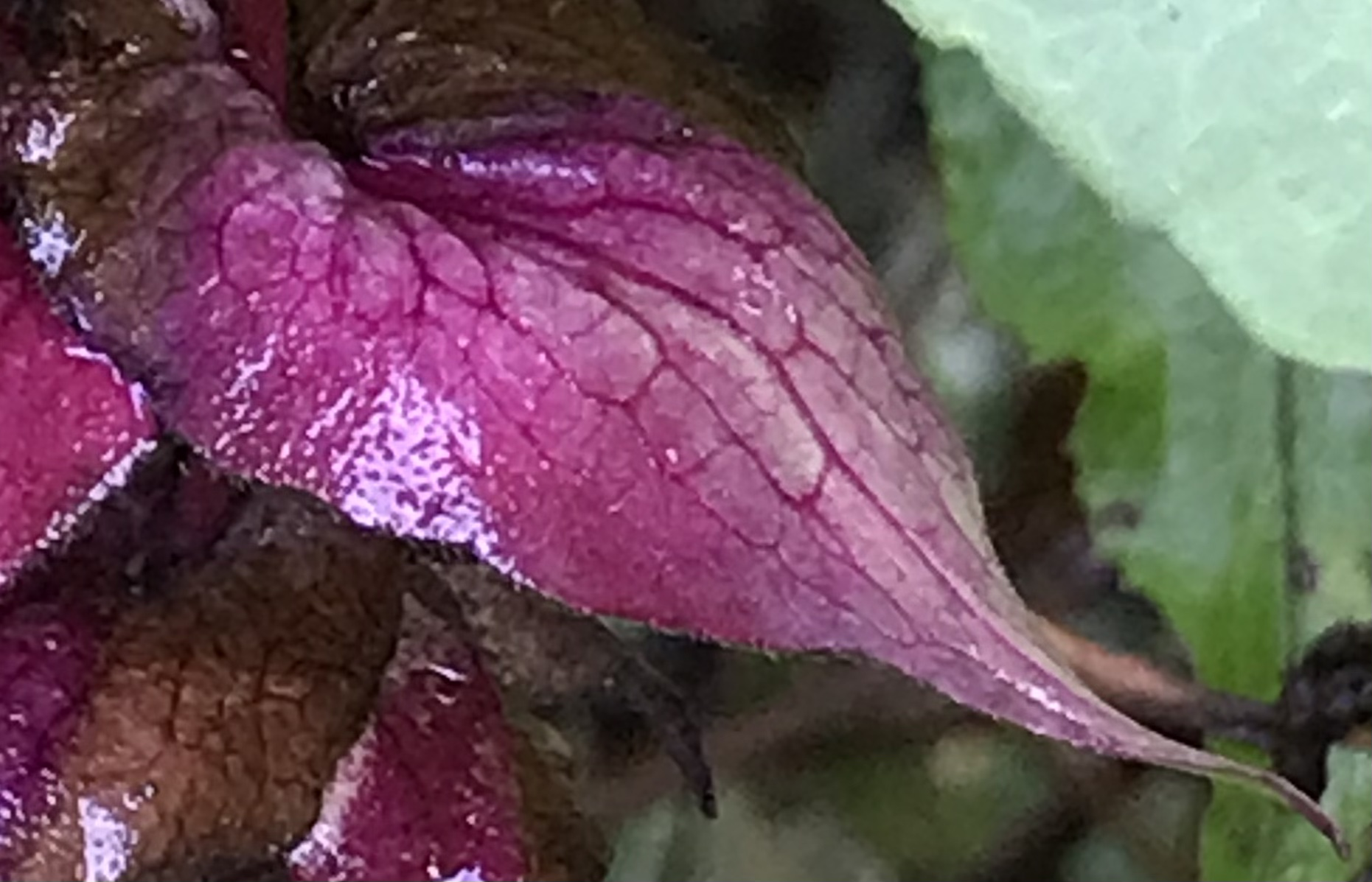
Close-up of single bract, showing attractive wine-red venation and drip tip

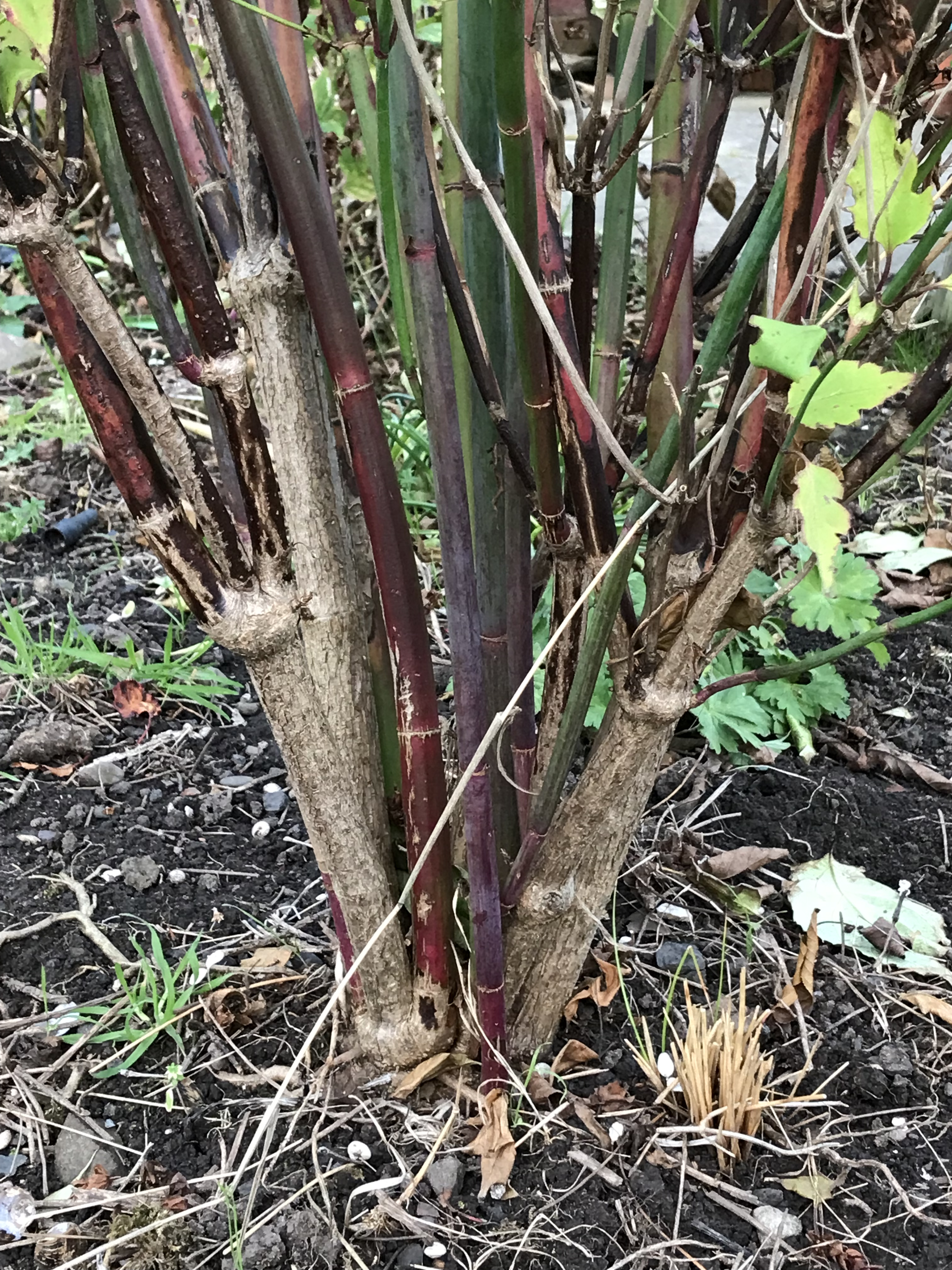
Base of a cultivated plant showing hollow stems of various ages, Paxton, Scottish Borders

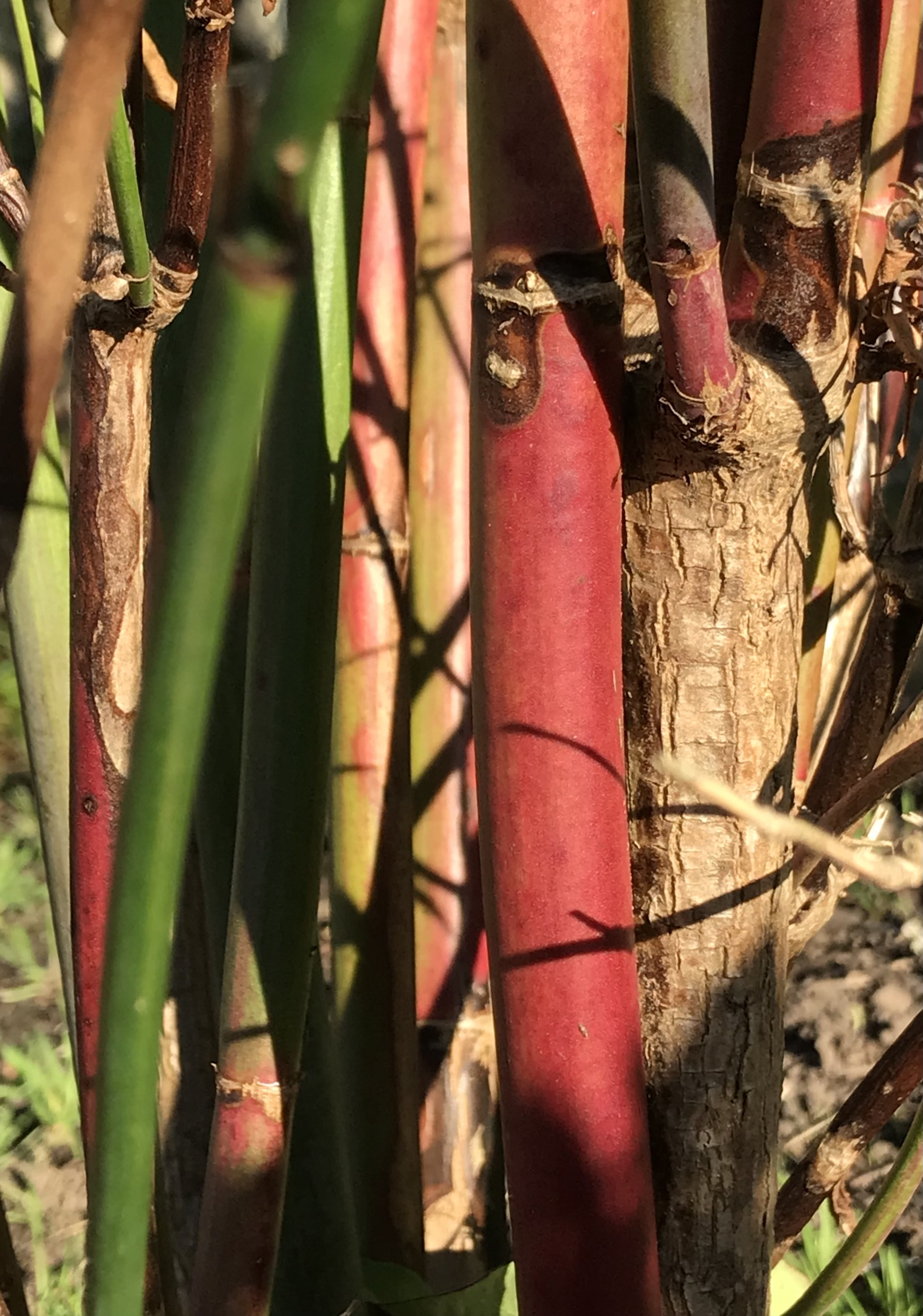
Detail of colourful stems of same specimen, showing value for winter colour in garden

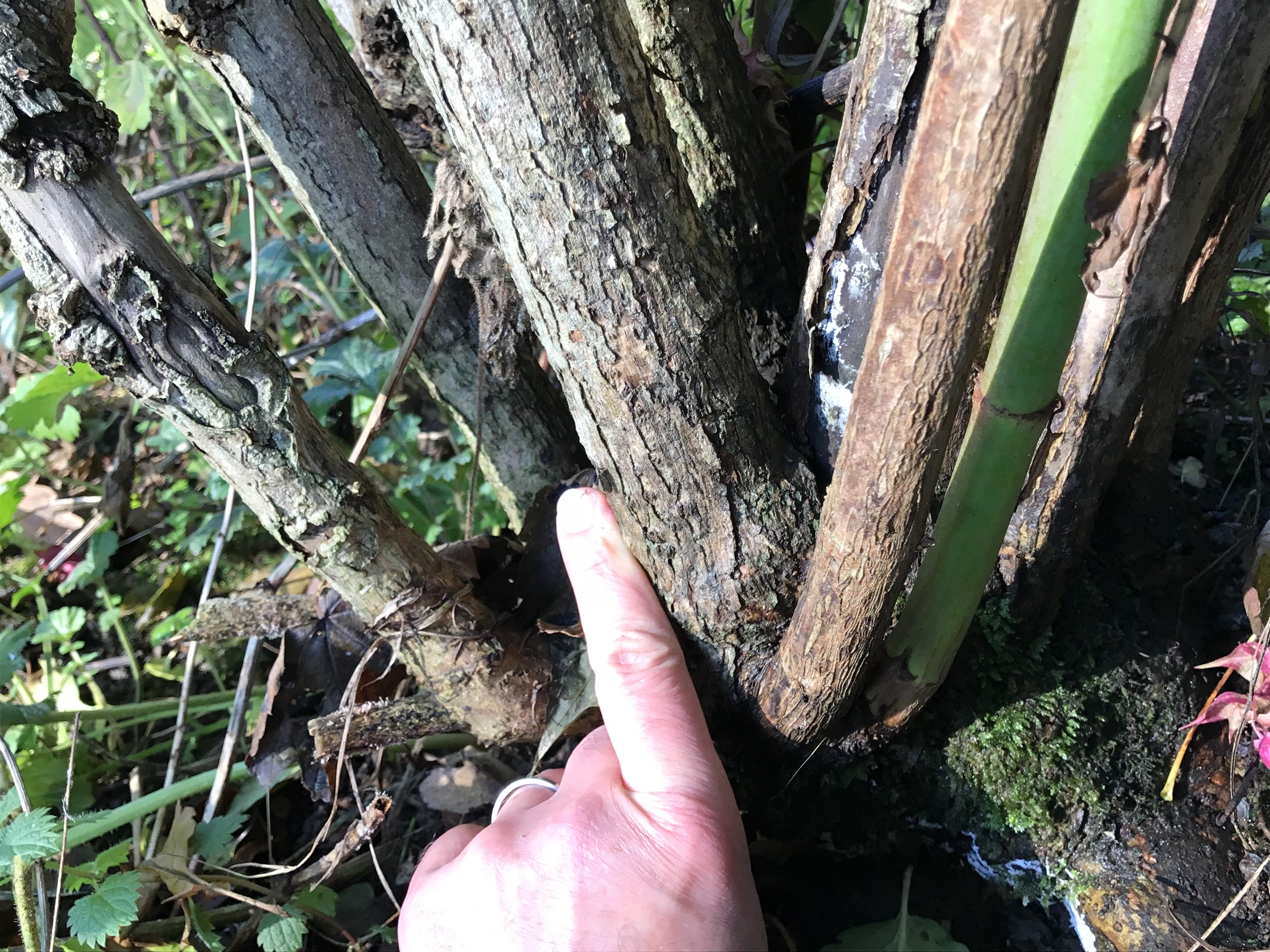
Base of a more mature specimen – oldest trunk with finger to show scale, Berrington

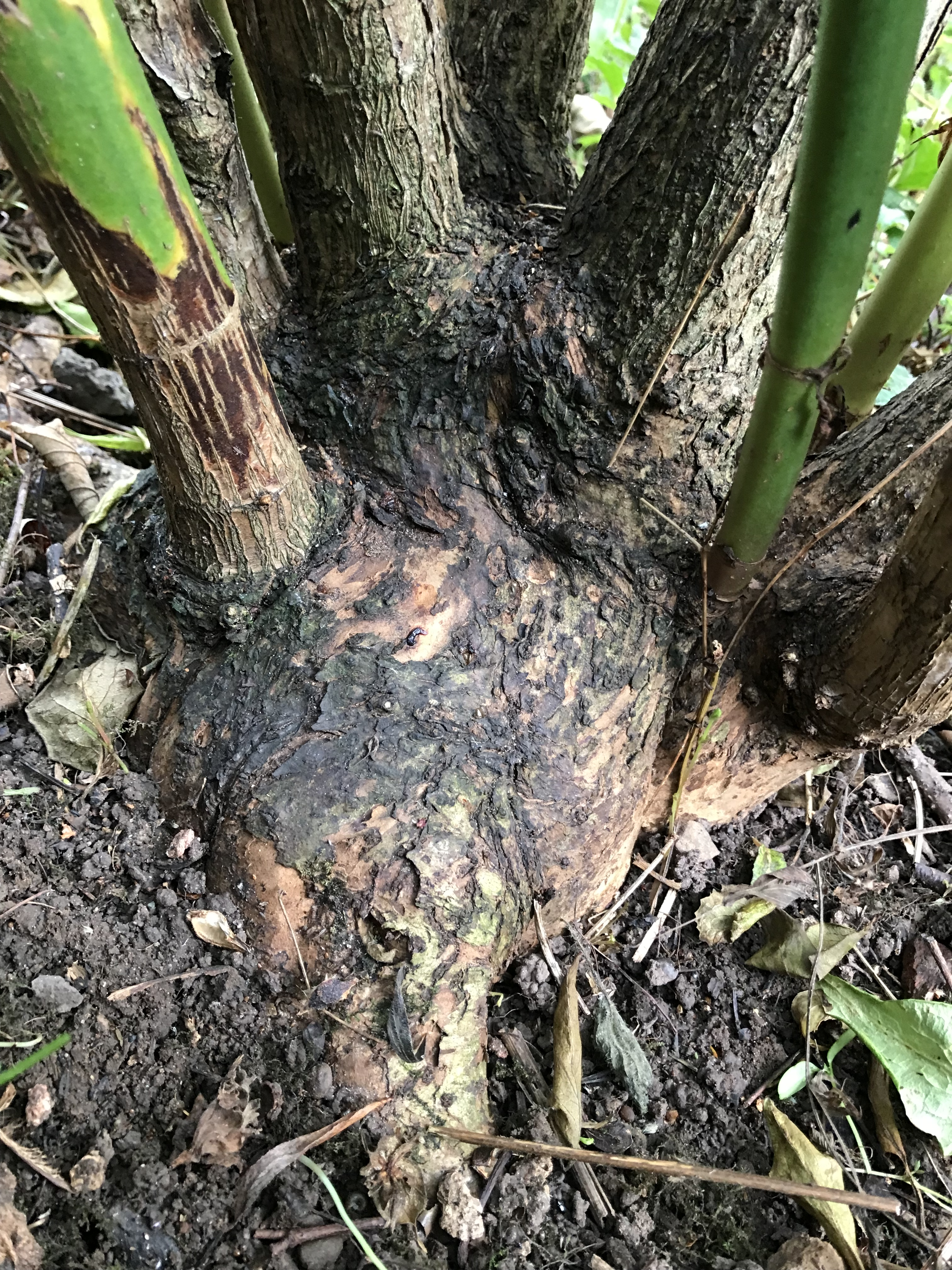
Lignotuber, grey trunks and green stems of same specimen

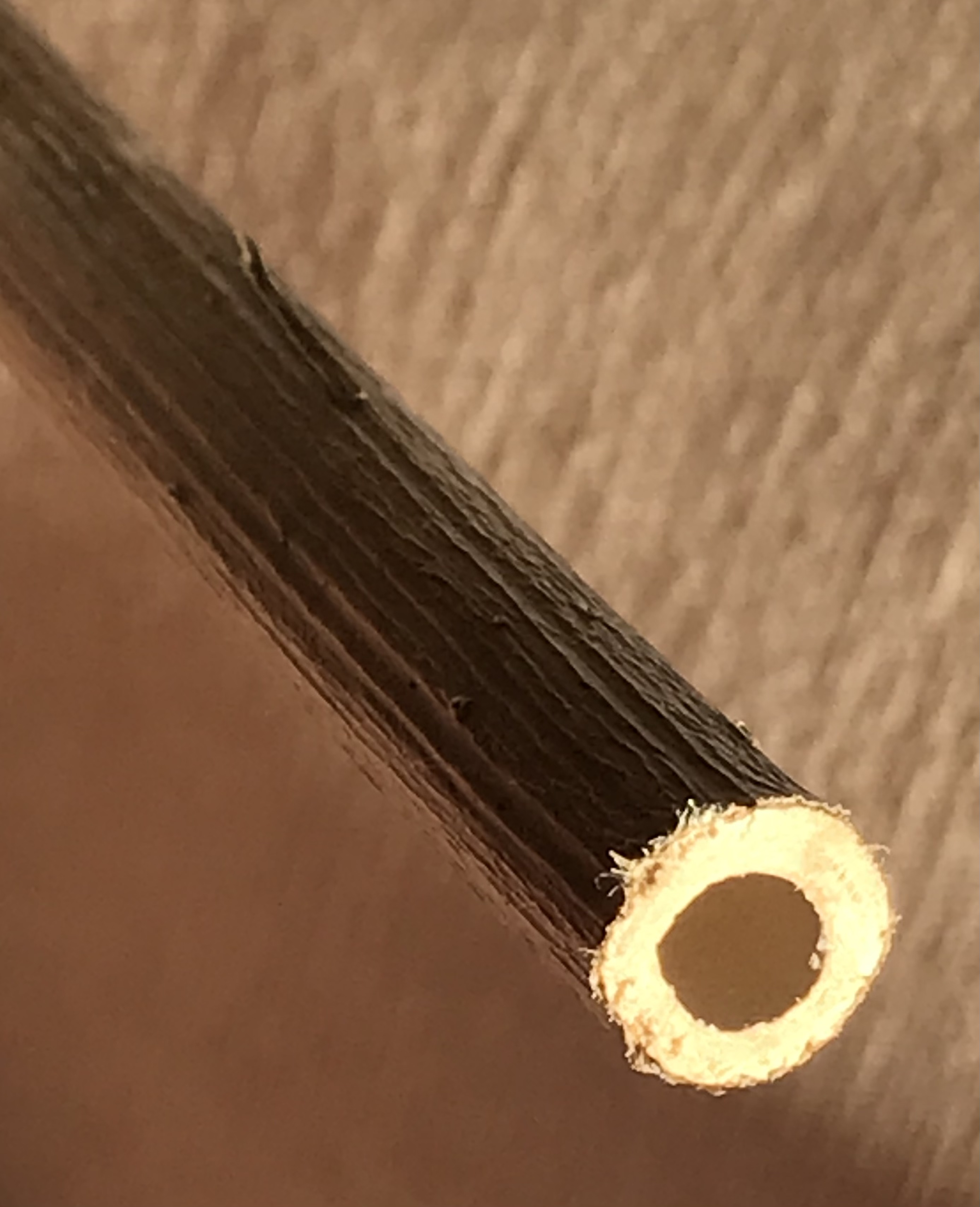
Single pan-pipe (lower end closed by natural septum) sawn from a dead stem

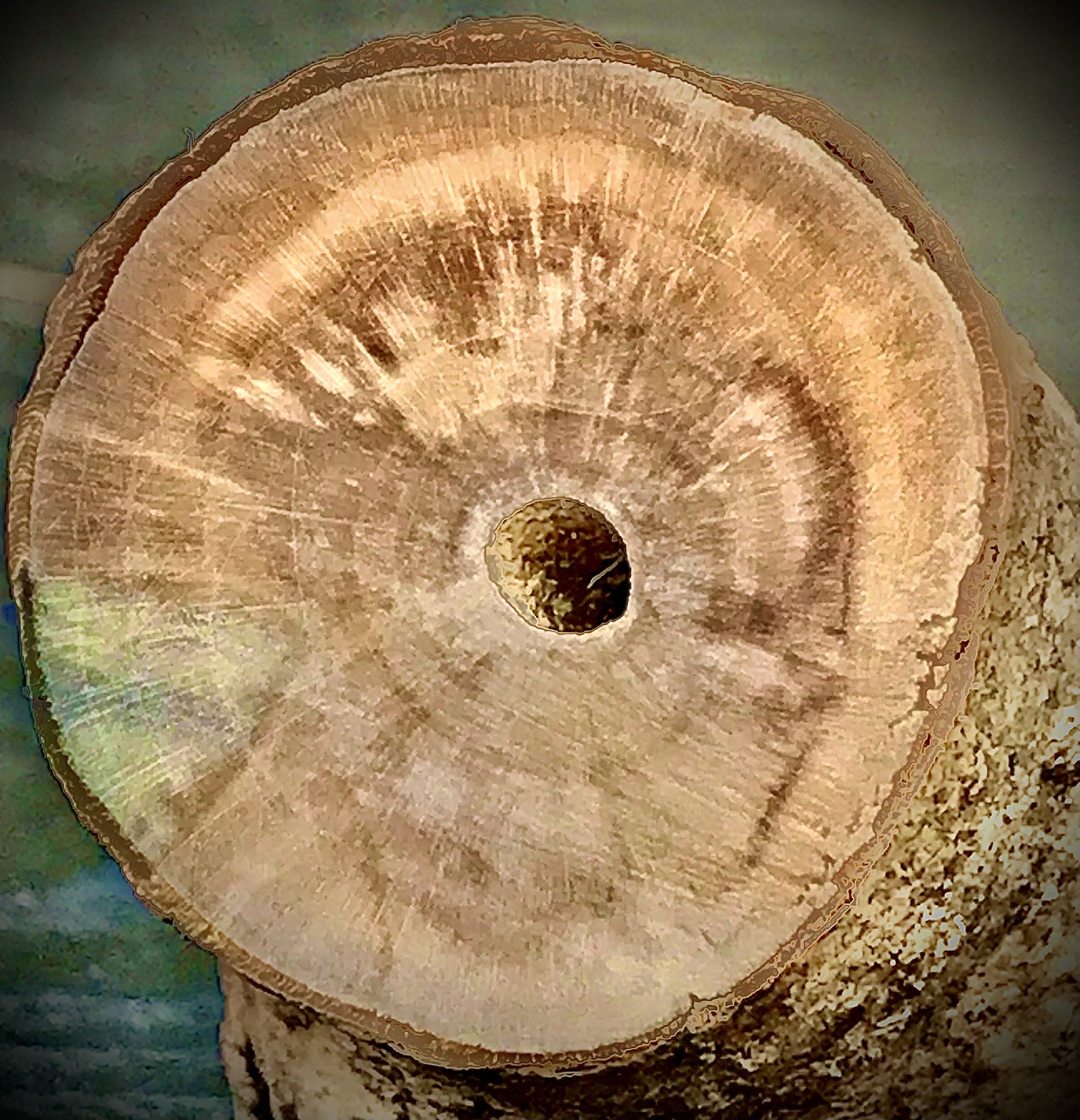
Sawn and polished section of a (dead) woody basal trunk. (True wood, not usual bamboo-like fistular stems of top growth)
