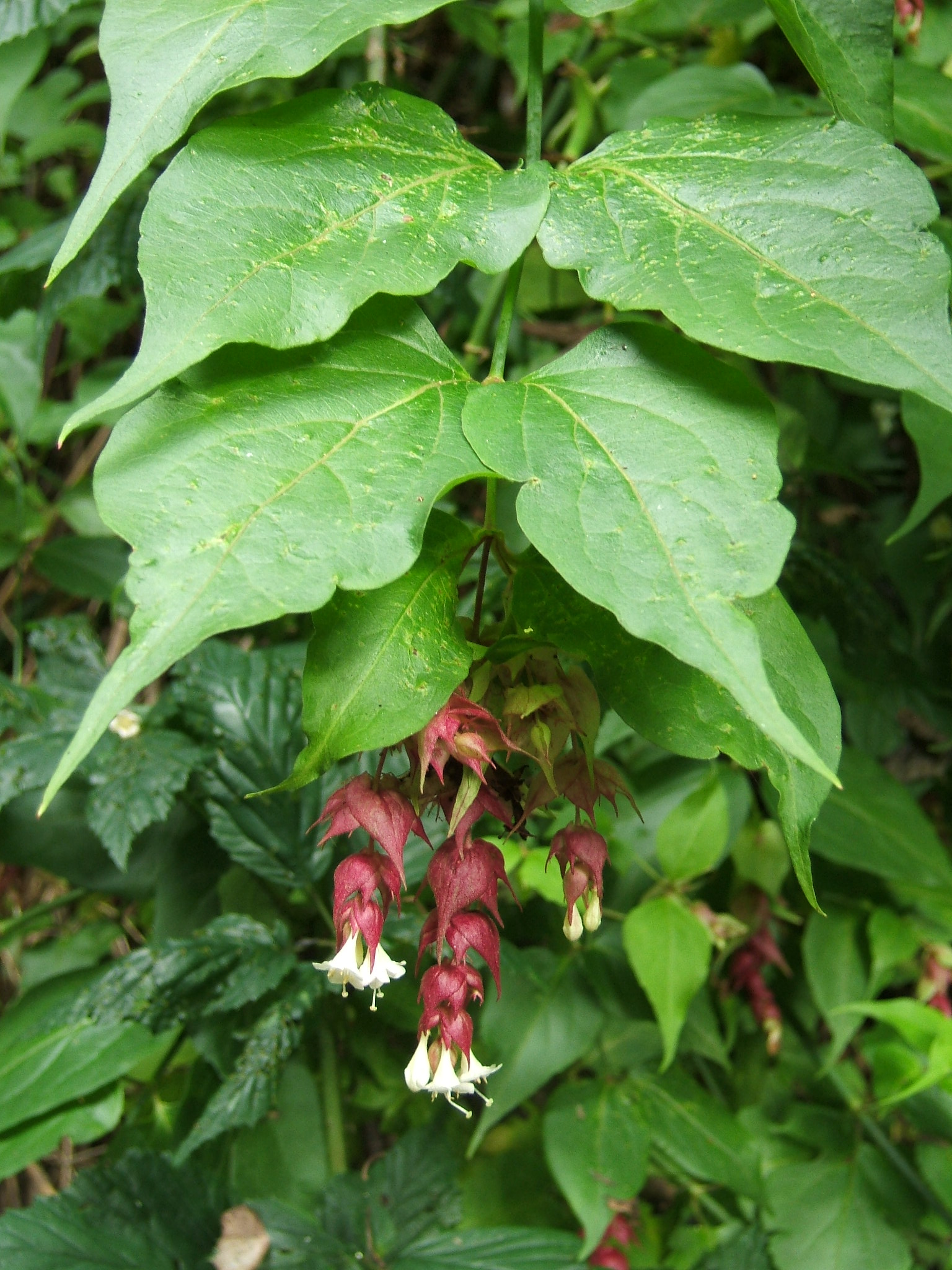
- Leycesteria formosa

Scientific classification
- Kingdom: Plantae
- Clade: Embryophytes
- Clade: Tracheophytes
- Clade: Spermatophytes
- Clade: Angiosperms
- Clade: Eudicots
- Clade: Asterids
- Order: Dipsacales
- Family: Caprifoliaceae
- Subfamily: Caprifolioideae
- Genus: Leycesteria; Wall. (1824)

Species
- Leycesteria crocothyrsos Airy Shaw; Leycesteria dibangvalliensis S.K.Das & G.S.Giri; Leycesteria formosa Wall.; Leycesteria glaucophylla (Hook.f. & Thomson) Hook.f.; Leycesteria gracilis (Kurz) Airy Shaw; Leycesteria stipulata (Hook.f. & Thomson) Fritsch; Leycesteria insignis Merr.

= Leycesteria =

Genus of flowering plants in the honeysuckle family

Leycesteria is a genus of flowering plants in the honeysuckle family Caprifoliaceae. It includes seven species native to the Himalayas of northern Pakistan, India, Nepal, Bhutan, and Tibet, and to Myanmar and southwestern China.

The species are shrubs with short-lived stems with soft wood, growing to 1.5–2 m (4 ft 11 in – 6 ft 7 in) tall. One species, Leycesteria formosa (Himalayan honeysuckle or flowering nutmeg), is a popular garden shrub in Britain.

Leycesteria was named for William Leycester, a horticulturist in Bengal in about 1820.
