= Leicester (disambiguation) =

Leicester is a city in central England.

Leicester may also refer to:

== Places ==
=== United States ===
- Leicester, Massachusetts
- Leicester, New York, a town
  - Leicester (village), New York, part of the town
- Leicester, North Carolina
- Leicester, Vermont, a community
- Leicester Township, Clay County, Nebraska

=== England ===
- Leicester, a city in the Midlands
  - HM Prison Leicester, opened 1828
  - Leicester railway station, opened 1840
- Leicester (European Parliament constituency), 1979–1999
- County of Leicester, Leicestershire formally until 1969
  - Leicester (UK Parliament constituency), 1295–1918
  - Leicester Forest East, a village
- Leicester Square, London (opened 1670)

=== Elsewhere ===
- Leicester, Alberta, Canada
- Leicester (islet), Cook Islands
- Leicester, Sierra Leone

== Education ==
- Leicester Academy, Massachusetts, United States (1784–1921)
- Leicester College, England (founded 1999)
- University of Leicester, England (founded 1921)

== People ==
=== Surname ===
- George Leicester (disambiguation)
- Henry M. Leicester (1906–1991), American biochemist and historian of chemistry
- Jon Leicester (born 1979), American baseball player
- Margot Leicester (born 1949), British actor
- Robert Leicester (disambiguation)

=== Given name ===
- Leicester Devereux, 6th Viscount Hereford (1617–1676), British peer
- Leicester Devereux, 7th Viscount Hereford (1674–1683), British peer
- Leicester Hemingway (1915–1982), American writer
- Leicester Martin (c.1662–1732), British politician
- Leicester Smyth (1829–1891), British Army officer and Governor of Gibraltar

=== Titles ===
- Earl of Leicester, a peerage of the United Kingdom
- Leicester baronets, including a list of people who have held the title

== Sport ==
- Leicester City F.C., an English football club
- Leicester Riders, a British basketball team
- Leicester Tigers, an English rugby union team

== Other uses ==
- Leicester cheese
- Leicester, a breed of sheep also known as Leicester Longwool
- SS Leicester (1891), a passenger and cargo vessel

== See also ==
- Leicester House (disambiguation)
- Leinster (disambiguation)
- Leister (disambiguation)
- Lester (disambiguation)
- Leycester (disambiguation)
