= Leycester =

Leycester may refer to:

== People ==
=== Given name ===
- Hugh Leycester Hornby (1888–1965), an Anglican clergyman in Lancashire
- John Leycester Adolphus (1795–1862), an English lawyer, jurist and author
- Joseph Leycester Lyne, known as Father Ignatius of Jesus (1837–1908), an Anglican Benedictine monk
- Leycester Coltman (1938–2003), British ambassador to Cuba from 1991 to 1994
- Leycester Meares (1909–1994), Australian judge
- Robert Leycester Haymes (1870–1942), a lieutenant-colonel in the British Army

=== Surname ===
- Augustus Adolphus Leycester, pastoralist and early settler at Tuncester, New South Wales, Australia
- Francis Leycester (fl.1520s–), first dean of Peterborough, England
- George Leycester (1763—1838), an English amateur cricketer
- George Leycester, English member of Parliament for Thirsk
- Joseph Leycester (1784–1859), an Irish politician
- Peter Leycester (1614–1678), an English antiquarian and historian
- Ralph Leycester (1763–1835), English politician
- William Leycester, a horticulturist in Bengal in about 1820, after which the genus Leycesteria was named

== Places ==
- Leycester, New South Wales, a locality in the City of Lismore, NSW, Australia
- Leycester Creek, a perennial stream in the Richmond River catchment area, NSW, Australia

== See also ==
- Leicester, a city in England
- Leicester (disambiguation)
- Leycesteria, a genus of flowering plants named after horticulturalist William Leycester
- Lord Leycester Hospital, Warwick, England
- Lord Leycester Hotel, Warwick, England
