= Colemans Bridge =

Bridge in New South Wales, Australia

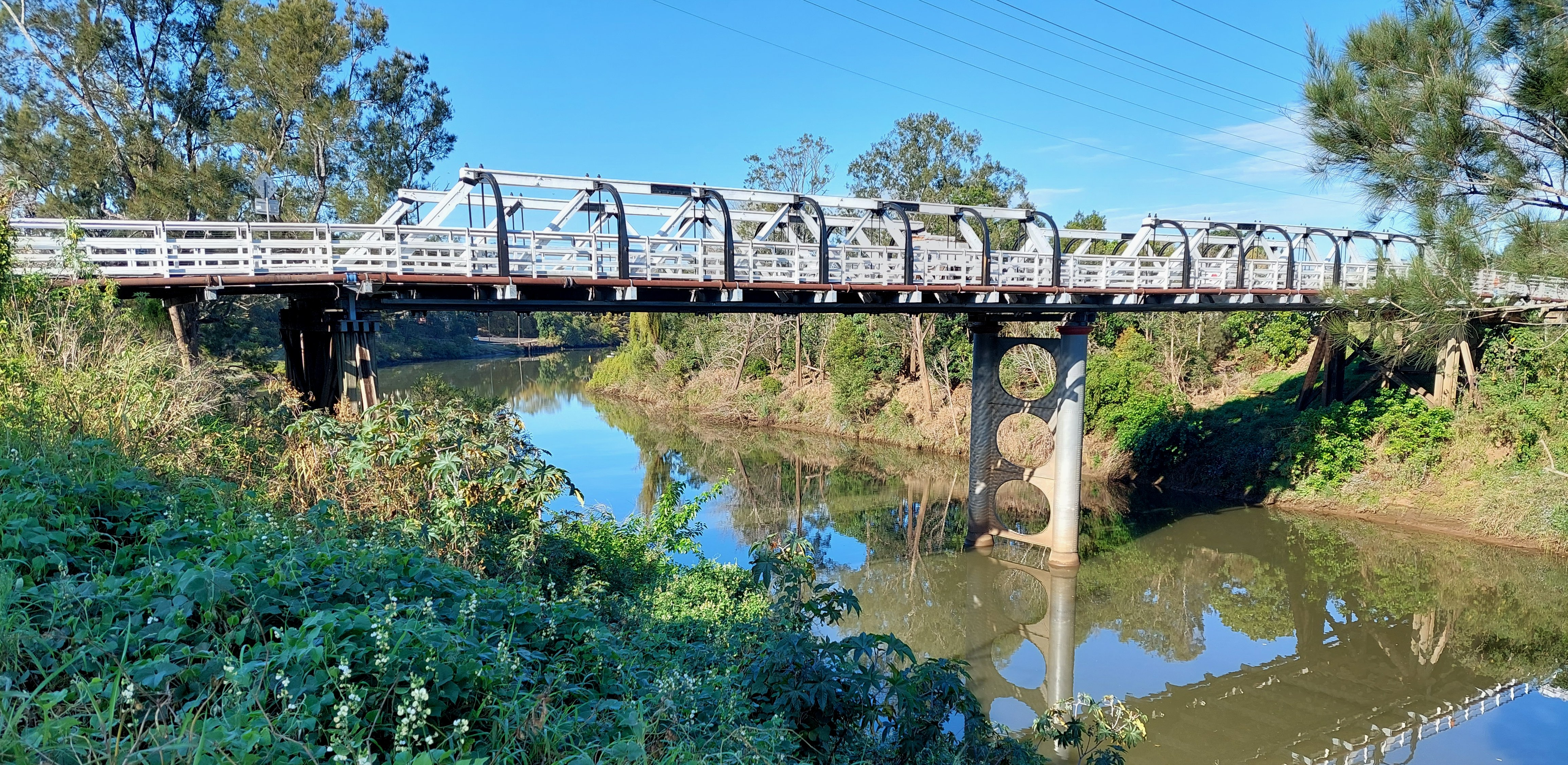
- Colemans Bridge over Leycester Creek in 2023
- Coordinates: 28°48′22″S 153°16′30″E
- Crosses: Leycester Creek
- Locale: Lismore
- Begins: Lismore
- Ends: South Lismore
- Named for: John Coleman
- Owner: Transport for NSW
- Heritage status: Heritage Act — State Heritage Register
- Next upstream: Leycester Creek railway bridge
- Followed by: Ballina Street bridge (Bruxner Highway), Wilsons River

Characteristics
- Design: Dare truss
- Material: Lumber
- Total length: 90.7 m (298 ft)
- Width: 6.1 m (20 ft)
- Longest span: 32 m (105 ft)
- No. of spans: 2
- No. of lanes: 2

History
- Architect: Harvey Dare
- Constructed by: W. F. Oakes
- Opened: 1908

New South Wales Heritage Register
- Official name: Colemans Bridge over Leycester Creek
- Type: state heritage (built)
- Designated: 20 June 2000
- Reference no.: 1463
- Type: Road Bridge
- Category: Transport – Land
- Builders: W. F. Oakes

Colemans Bridge is a heritage-listed road bridge that carries Union Street across the Leycester Creek in Lismore, New South Wales, Australia. It was designed by Harvey Dare and built in 1907 by W. F. Oakes. The bridge is owned by Transport for NSW. It was added to the New South Wales State Heritage Register on 20 June 2000.

== History ==
=== Timber truss bridges ===
Timber truss road bridges have played a significant role in the expansion and improvement of the NSW road network. Prior to the bridges being built, river crossings were often dangerous in times of rain, which caused bulk freight movement to be prohibitively expensive for most agricultural and mining produce. Only the high priced wool clip of the time was able to carry the costs and inconvenience imposed by the generally inadequate river crossings that often existed prior to the trusses construction.

Timber truss bridges were preferred by the Public Works Department from the mid 19th to the early 20th century because they were relatively cheap to construct, and used mostly local materials. The financially troubled governments of the day applied pressure to the Public Works Department to produce as much road and bridge work for as little cost as possible, using local materials. This condition effectively prohibited the use of iron and steel, as these, prior to the construction of the steel works at Newcastle in the early 20th century, had to be imported from England.

Harvey Dare, the designer of Dare truss and other bridges, was a leading engineer in the Public Works Department, and a prominent figure in early 20th century NSW.

Timber truss bridges, and timber bridges generally were so common that NSW was known to travellers as the "timber bridge state".

=== Colemans Bridge ===
The bridge was built in 1907 by Sydney contractor W. F. Oakes, opening in November that year. It replaced an older bridge, which was demolished and replaced with a temporary bridge during construction. It was originally known as the Leycester Creek Bridge but was renamed after John Coleman, then a recently deceased state MP for the area, in December 1907 after a request from the local council. Unlike the nearby Fawcett Bridge, it included provision for pedestrian traffic, which was a popular feature of the new bridge.

== Description ==
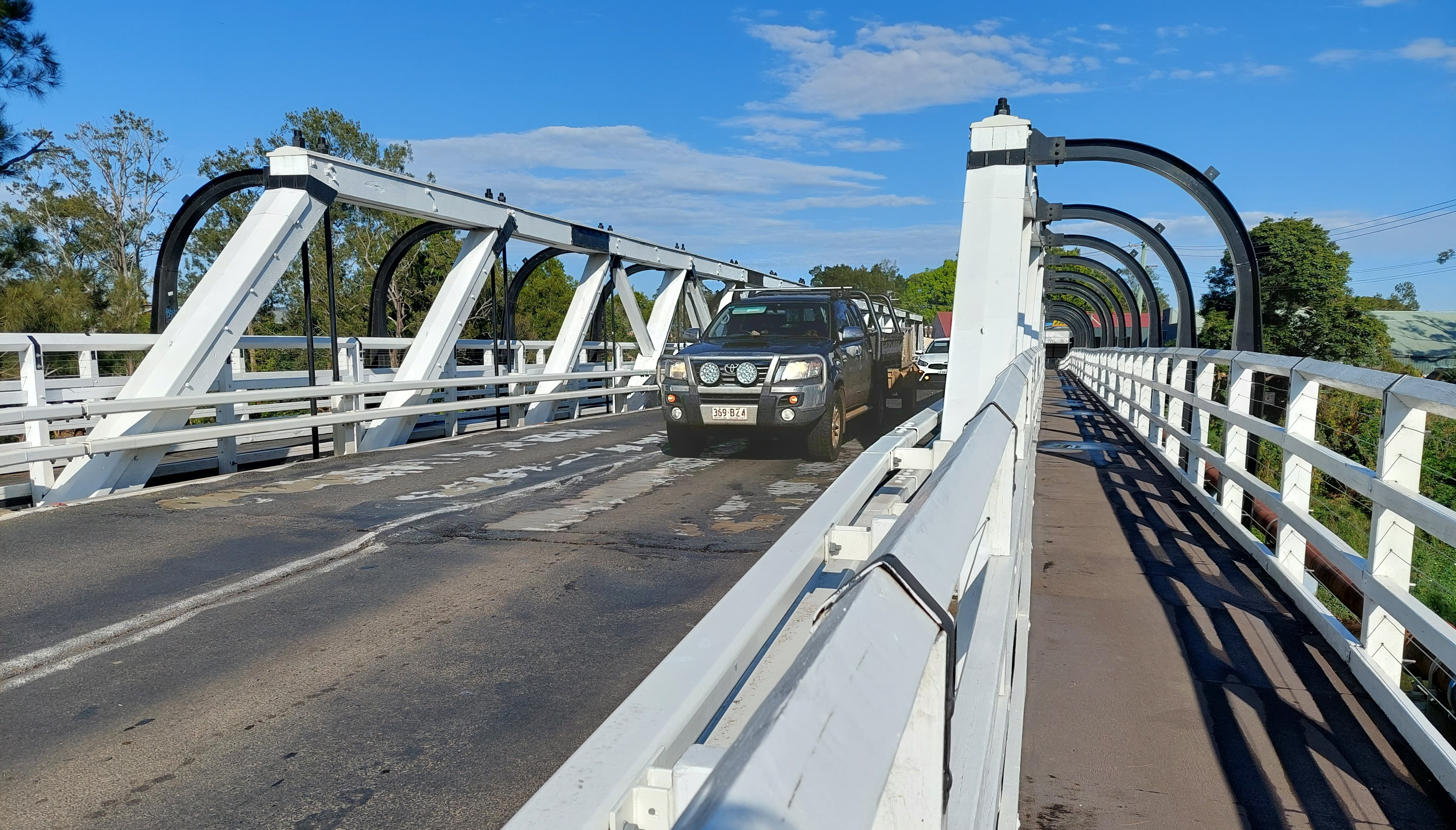
Colemans Bridge (road view)

Coleman's Bridge is a Dare-type timber truss road bridge. It has two timber truss spans, each of 32 metres (105 ft). There are tow timber approach spans at one end and one at the other giving the bridge an overall length of 90.7 metres (298 ft). The bridge has a twin cylindrical cast iron central pier. Timber trestles provide the remaining sub structure. The bridge deck provides a dual lane carriage way and a footpath both sides of the roadway. The minimum width of the carriage way is 6.1 metres (20 ft).

An Armco traffic guard rail provides protection to vehicular traffic and a timber post and rail barrier forms the pedestrian walkway handrail. Curved steel braces fixed to the top chord of the timber truss help strengthen the outer timber pedestrian barriers.

It was reported to be in good physical condition as at 13 September 2005.

== Heritage listing ==
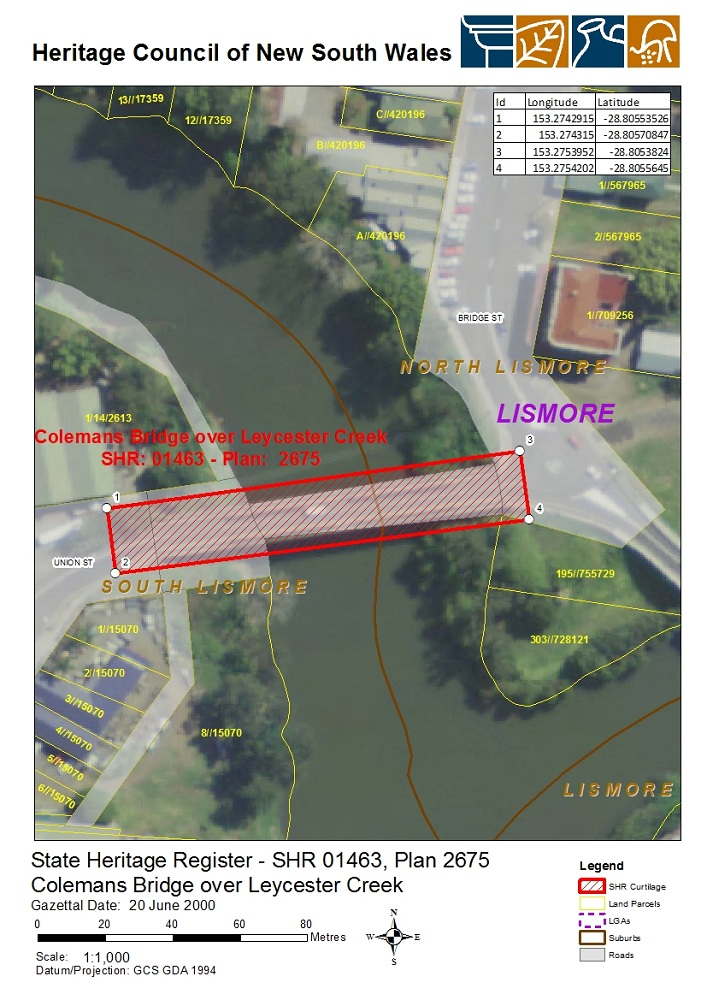
Map associated with heritage listing

Colemans Bridge is an early example of Dare timber truss bridges. In 1998 it was in good condition. As a timber truss road bridge, it has many associational links with important historical events, trends, and people, including the expansion of the road network and economic activity throughout NSW, and Harvey Dare, the designer of this type of truss. Dare trusses were fifth in the five stage design evolution of NSW timber truss road bridges. They were similar to Allan trusses, but contain improvements which make them stronger and easier to maintain. This engineering enhancement represents a significant evolution of the design of timber truss bridges, and gives Dare trusses some technical significance. Colemans Bridge has particular technical significance, having iron piers, the only two-lane Dare truss, footways, and long spans. In 1998 there were 27 surviving Dare trusses in NSW of the 40 built, and 82 timber truss road bridges survive from the over 400 built. Colemans Bridge is a representative example of Dare timber truss road bridges, and is assessed as being Nationally significant, primarily on the basis of its technical and historical significance.

Colemans Bridge over Leycester Creek was listed on the New South Wales State Heritage Register on 20 June 2000 having satisfied the following criteria.

The place is important in demonstrating the course, or pattern, of cultural or natural history in New South Wales.

Through the bridge's association with the expansion of the NSW road network, its ability to demonstrate historically important concepts such as the gradual acceptance of NSW people of American design ideas, and its association with Harvey Dare, it has historical significance.

The place is important in demonstrating aesthetic characteristics and/or a high degree of creative or technical achievement in New South Wales.

The bridge exhibits the technical excellence of its design, as all of the structural detail is clearly visible. In the context of its landscape it is visually attractive. As such, the bridge has moderate aesthetic significance.

The place has a strong or special association with a particular community or cultural group in New South Wales for social, cultural or spiritual reasons.

Timber truss bridges are prominent to road travellers, and NSW has in the past been referred to as the "timber truss bridge state". Through this, the complete set of bridges gain some social significance, as they could be said to be held in reasonable esteem by many travellers in NSW. Colemans Bridge is valued by the people of the Lismore region.

The place possesses uncommon, rare or endangered aspects of the cultural or natural history of New South Wales.

Rare - Colemans Bridge contains many important technical and aesthetic features.

The place is important in demonstrating the principal characteristics of a class of cultural or natural places/environments in New South Wales.

Highly representative of Dare timber truss bridges and late 19th century bridge technology

== See also ==
- Historic bridges of New South Wales
- List of bridges in Australia
- Leycester Creek railway bridge, Lismore
