= Back Creek (Richmond Valley, New South Wales) =

River in Australia

Coordinates: 28°33′S 153°04′E

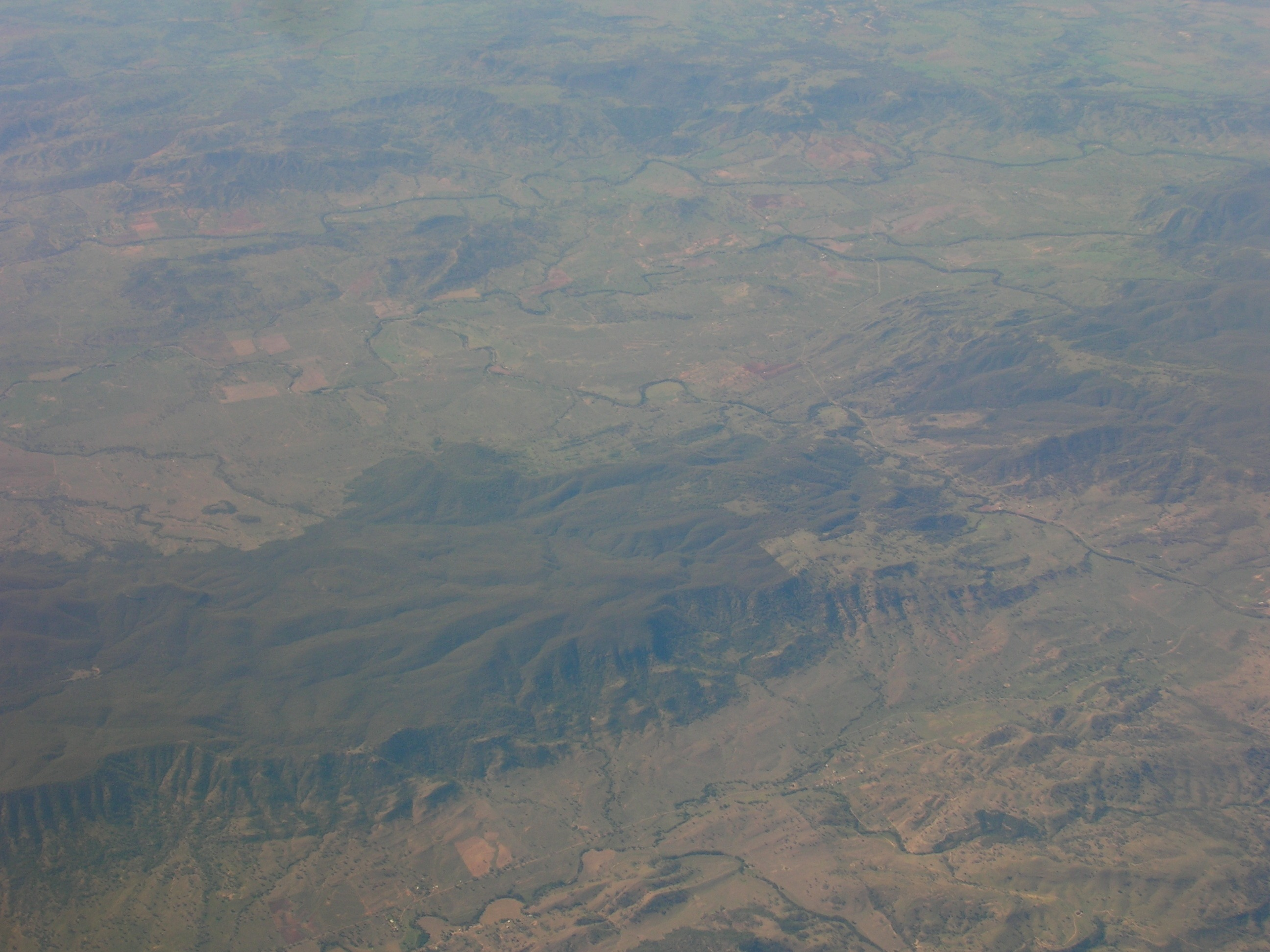
- Airborne - Brisbane to Adelaide Back Creek, New South Wales

Location
- Country: Australia
- State: New South Wales
- Region: South East Queensland (IBRA), Northern Rivers
- Local government area: Richmond Valley

Physical characteristics
- Source: Homeleigh Mountain
  - location: near Kyogle
  - elevation: 367 m (1,204 ft)
- Mouth: confluence with Leycester Creek
  - location: Leycester
  - elevation: 11 m (36 ft)
- Length: 63 km (39 mi)

Basin features
- River system: Richmond River catchment
- Tributaries
  - left: Boorabee Creek, Boundary Creek (Richmond Valley), Cadiangullong Creek

The Back Creek, a perennial stream of the Richmond River catchment, is located in Northern Rivers region in the state of New South Wales, Australia.

== Location and features ==
Back Creek rises below Homeleigh Mountain about 8 kilometres (5.0 mi) north northeast of Kyogle. The river flows generally south southeast, joined by three minor tributaries before reaching its confluence with the Leycester Creek near the village of Leycester. The river descends 357 metres (1,171 ft) over its 63 kilometres (39 mi) course.

== See also ==
- Rivers of New South Wales
- List of rivers of New South Wales (A-K)
- List of rivers of Australia
