= Lismore railway underbridges =

Railway viaducts and bridge in Lismore, New South Wales

Coordinates: 28.8021°S 153.2712°E

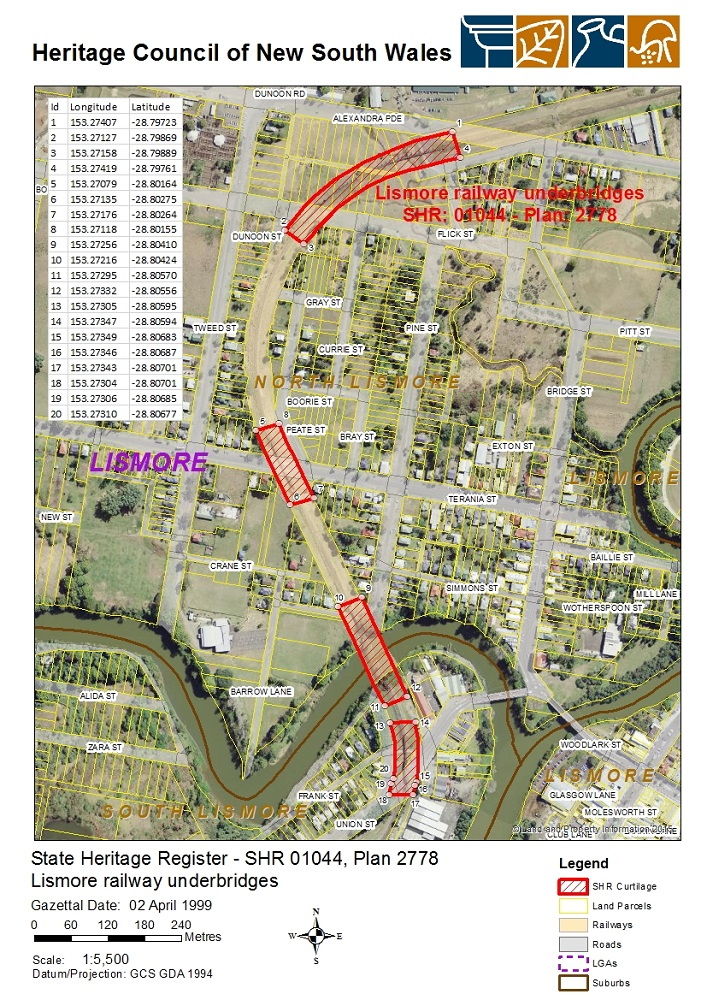
1044 - Lismore railway underbridges - SHR Plan No 2778 (5012077b100)

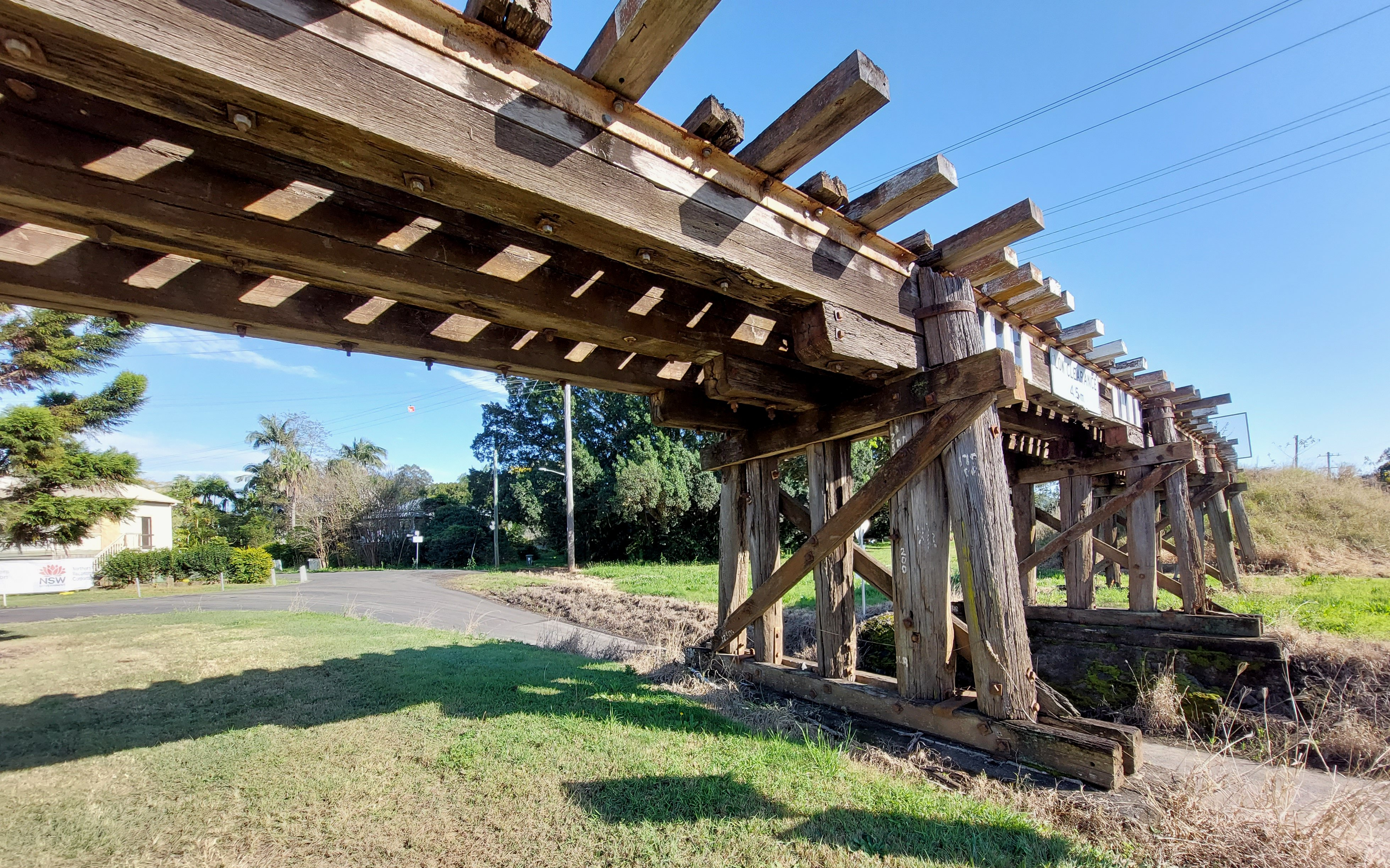
The railway viaduct crossing Union Street

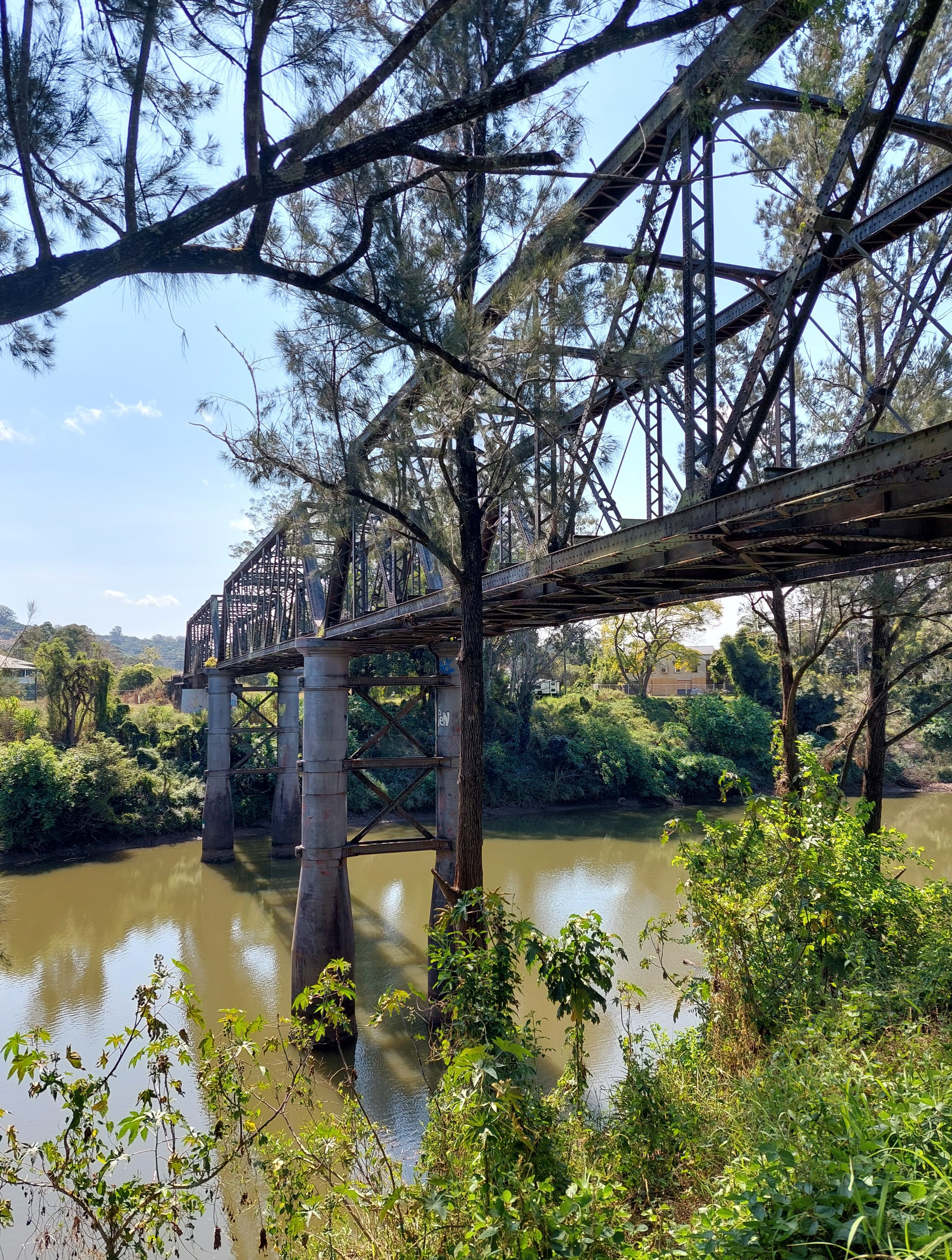
The Leycester Creek railway bridge in 2023

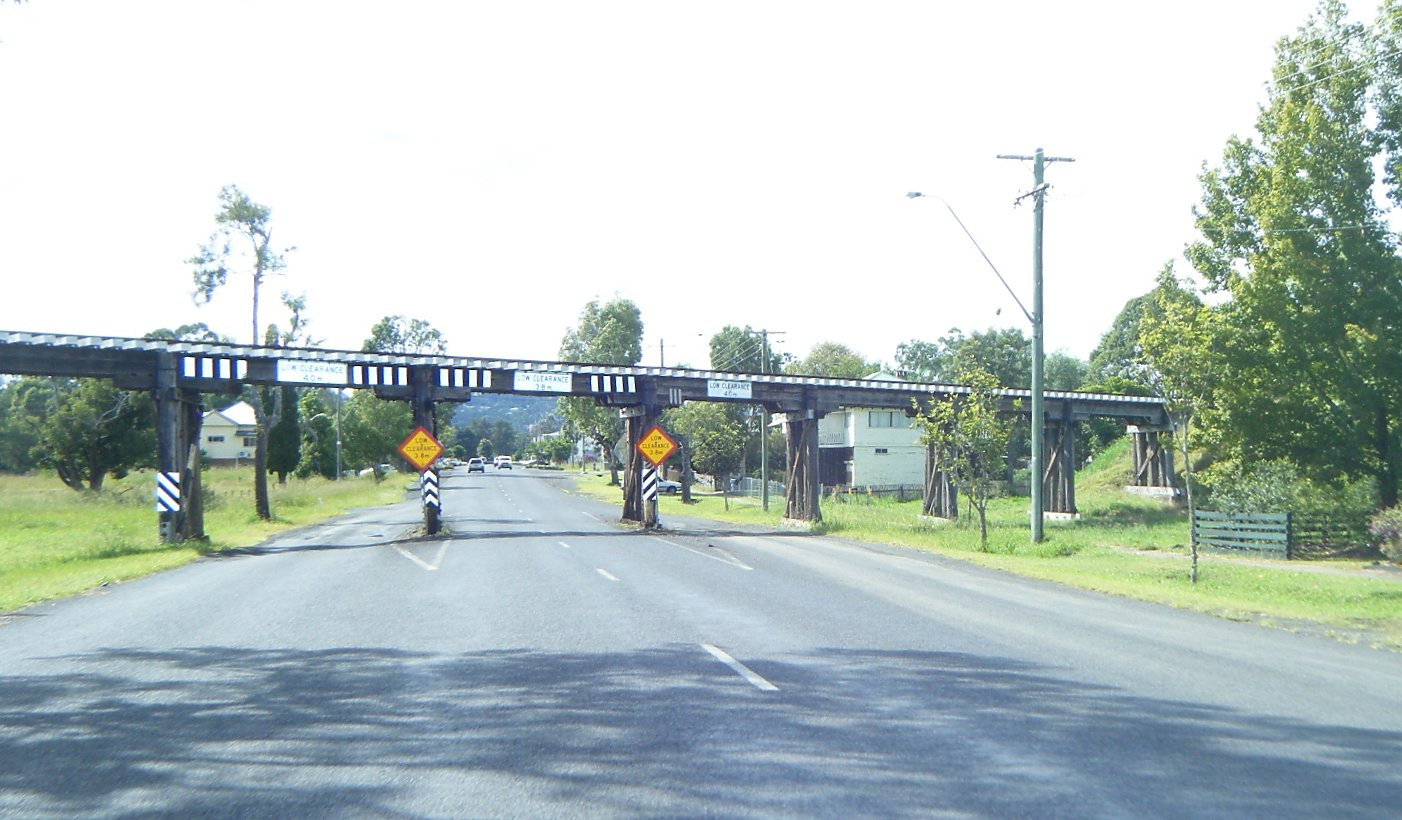
The Terania Street underbridge in 2010

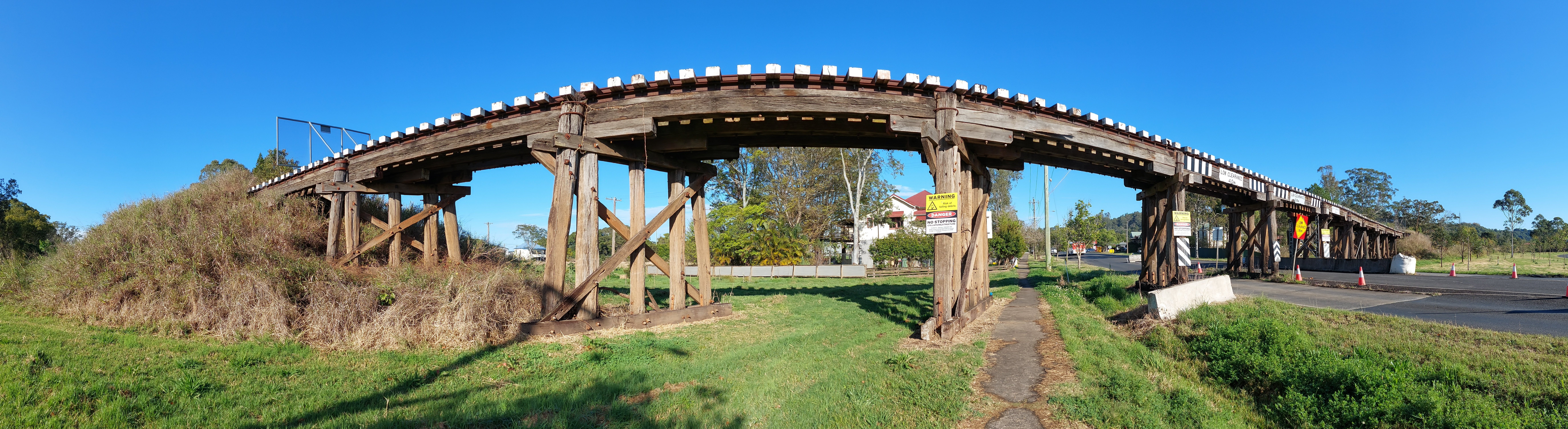
A panoranic view of the Terania Street underbridge in 2023, taken prior to its 2024 removal

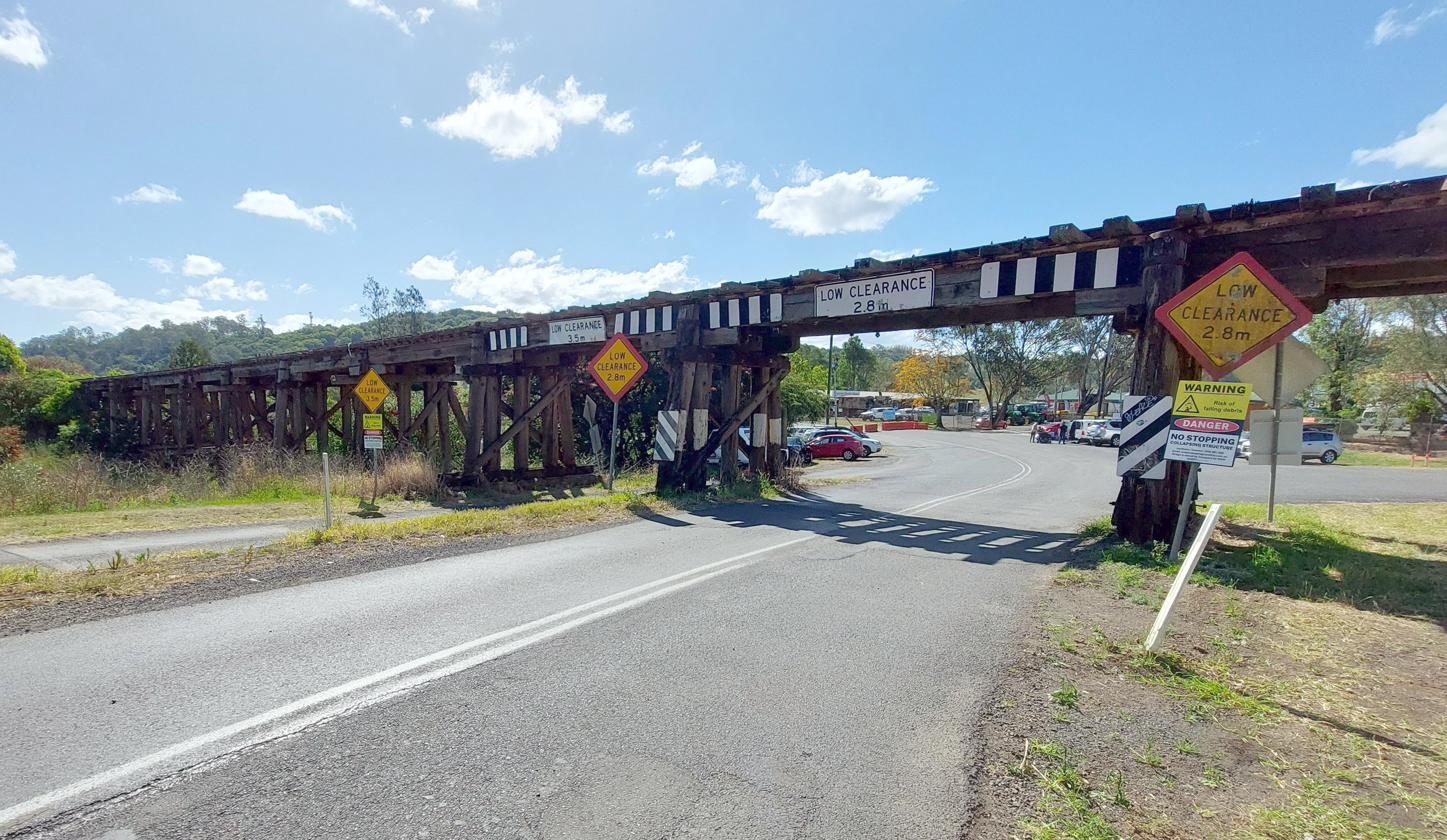
Railway underbridge at Alexandra Parade

Lismore railway underbridges is a heritage-listed group of railway-associated structures in Lismore, New South Wales, Australia erected for the 1894 creation of that section of the Murwillumbah railway line. This item (as no. SHR 1044) was added to the New South Wales State Heritage Register on 2 April 1999. It comprises the steel frame Leycester Creek railway bridge that carries the railway over Leycester Creek, plus associated timber (trestle) structures that cross Union Street in South Lismore, and Terania Street and Alexander Parade in North Lismore. As at October 2023, the Leycester Creek railway bridge was closed to the public for safety reasons while the Terania Street crossing, normally open to vehicular traffic, was temporarily closed to allow maintenance work to be carried out.

The heritage listing states: "The Lismore bridges and viaducts are a fine set of bridges all in one location demonstrating the problems of building railways in this flood prone area dating from 1892."

These bridges form part of a proposed Northern Rivers Rail Trail of which the relevant 15.5 kilometres (Lismore to Eltham section) was costed at AUD $17,825,425 to construct in a 2019 business proposal. A core value of this proposal was to "preserve and incorporate historical assets such as local stations, rail structures and historic bridges" although such bridges might be "remediated or replaced (subject to engineering assessment)". A separate, 2018 assessment reported that the steel truss Leycester Creek bridge would cost in the order of AUD $1 million to bring up to current standards.

Despite its heritage status, on 13 October 2023 the Lismore City Council voted to "support a motion to contact Transport for NSW and Janelle Saffin MP requesting a process to remove the Terania Street rail bridge as soon as possible so that Terania Street can be reopened permanently." This process was successful and the bridge was demolished in September 2024.
