= Lester (disambiguation) =

Lester is a surname and given name.

Lester may also refer to:

== Places ==
=== United States ===
- Lester, Alabama, a town
- Lester, Georgia, an unincorporated community
- Lester, Iowa, a city
- Lester Township, Black Hawk County, Iowa
- Lester, a community in Tinicum Township, Delaware County, Pennsylvania
- Lester, Washington, a ghost town
- Lester, West Virginia, a town
- Lester River, which flows through Duluth, Minnesota

=== Elsewhere ===
- Lester Peak, Ellsworth Land, Antarctica
- Lester Cove, a cove in Graham Land, Antarctica
- 14583 Lester, an asteroid

== Other uses ==
- Lester Piano Company
- Hurricane Lester (disambiguation)
- USS Lester (DE-1022), a destroyer escort
- Cromer Lifeboat Lester ON 1287, a lifeboat stationed at Cromer, Norfolk, England
- Lester Award, a horse racing award given in Great Britain to jockeys
- Lester's Foods Ltd., a Canadian meat processor
- Lester's theorem in geometry
- Lester Public Library, Two Rivers, Wisconsin
- Lester Apartments, a former building in Seattle, Washington

== See also ==
- Leicester (disambiguation)
