= Leinster (disambiguation) =

Leinster is an Irish province.

Leinster may also refer to:

== Places ==
- Leinster, Western Australia, a mining town
  - Leinster Airport, Western Australia
- Leinster (Province of Canada electoral district), a former electoral district
- Kingdom of Leinster, a kingdom of Gaelic Ireland from the 7th century BC to 1603
- Leinster (European Parliament constituency), Ireland
- Mount Leinster, a mountain in Ireland
- Leinster Bay, U.S. Virgin Islands

== Sports in Leinster, Ireland ==
=== Cricket ===
- Leinster Cricket Club, Dublin; based in Rathmines, plays in the Leinster Senior League
- Leinster Lightning, a cricket team; represents Leinster in inter-provincial competitions
- Leinster Cricket Union, governs cricket in Leinster

=== Other sports ===
- Leinster Football Association, governs association football in Leinster
- Leinster GAA, governs Gaelic games in Leinster, and fields teams for inter-provincial competitions
- Leinster Rugby, a rugby union team

== Ships ==
- RMS Leinster (1896), a passenger ship
- MV Leinster (1937), a passenger ferry
- MV Leinster (1968), a car/passenger ship
- MS Madeleine, a car/passenger ferry built in 1981 with the name Leinster

== Other uses ==
- Duke of Leinster, the premier dukedom in the Peerage of Ireland
- Earl of Leinster, a title in the Peerage of Ireland
- Murray Leinster, pen name of American writer William F. Jenkins (1896–1975)
- Paul Leinster, British academic
- Tom Leinster (born 1971), British mathematician

== See also ==
- Leicester (disambiguation)
