= George Leicester =

George Leicester or Leycester may also refer to:

- George Leicester, 2nd Baron de Tabley (1811–1887)
- George Leycester (1763–1838), cricketer
- George Leycester (MP) for Thirsk (UK Parliament constituency)
