= Rocky Creek Dam =

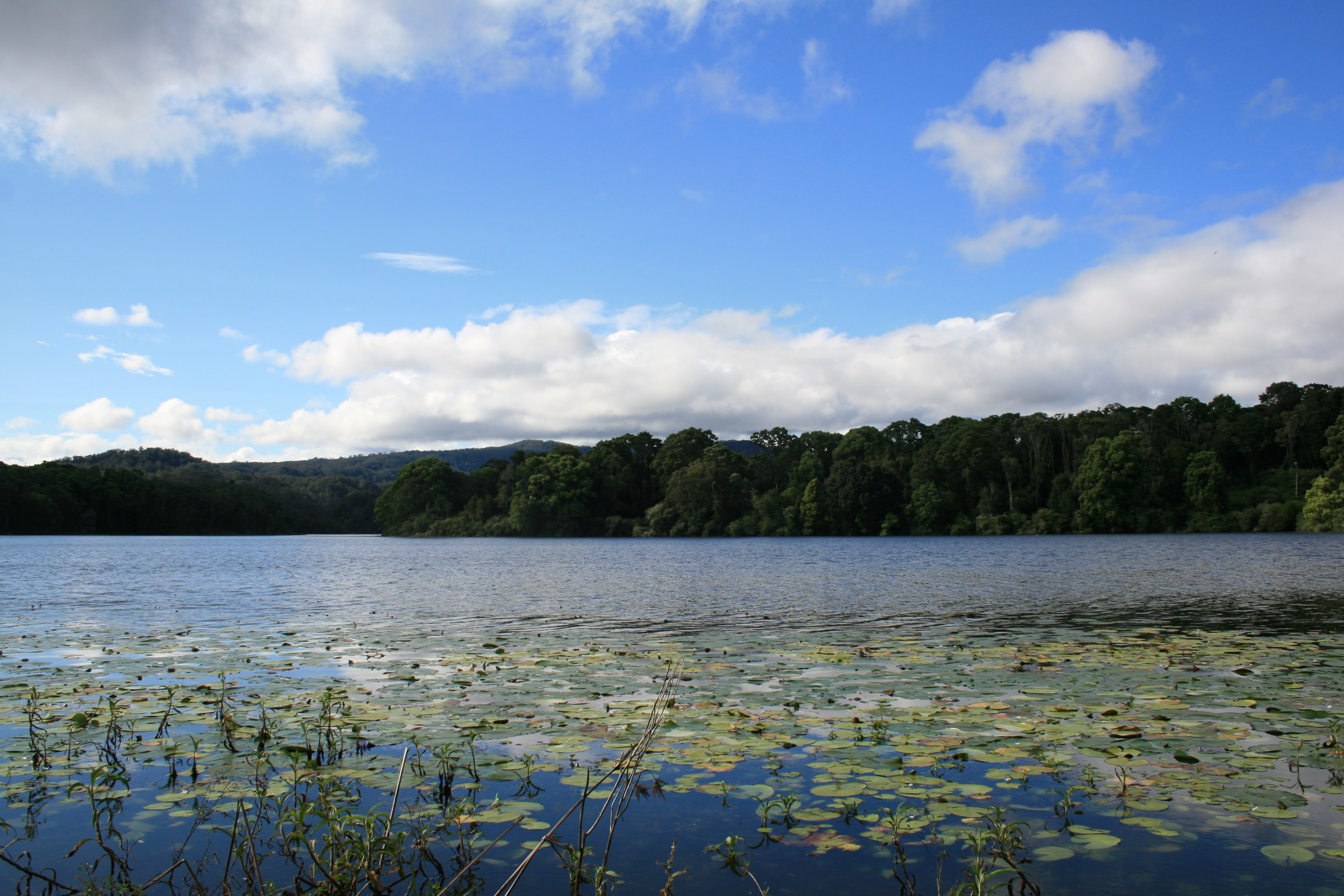
- Rocky Lake, 2010

- Location of the Rocky Creek Dam in New South Wales
- Country: Australia
- Location: Northern Rivers, New South Wales
- Coordinates: 28°37′54″S 153°21′04″E
- Purpose: Water supply
- Status: Operational
- Construction began: 1949
- Opening date: April 1953
- Owner: Rous County Council

Dam and spillways
- Type of dam: Embankment dam
- Impounds: Rocky Creek
- Height: 28 metres (92 ft)
- Length: 220 metres (720 ft)
- Dam volume: 153 cubic metres (5,400 cu ft)
- Spillways: 1
- Spillway capacity: 730 cubic metres per second (26,000 cu ft/s)

Reservoir
- Creates: Rocky Lake
- Total capacity: 14,000 megalitres (490×10^{6} cu ft)
- Catchment area: 31 square kilometres (12 sq mi)
- Surface area: 200 hectares (490 acres)
- Normal elevation: 187 metres (614 ft) AHD
- Website; Rocky Creek Dam

Rocky Creek Dam is a minor rock fill clay core embankment dam across the Rocky Creek, located upstream of Lismore in the Northern Rivers region of New South Wales, Australia. The dam's main purpose is to supply potable water for the region, including Lismore, Ballina, Byron Bay, Evans Head and Alstonville. The impounded reservoir is called Rocky Lake.

== Location and features ==
Commenced in 1949 and completed in April 1953, the Rocky Creek Dam is a minor dam located in the Northern Rivers region of New South Wales, situated approximately 25 kilometres (16 mi) north of Lismore. The dam is the principal component of the Rous County Council bulk supply network for the region, experiencing population growth. The dam was built by Dayal Singh under contract to the Rous County Council.

The dam wall is made up of about 80,000 tonnes (79,000 long tons) of rock, soil, clay and concrete and is 28 metres (92 ft) high and 220 metres (720 ft) long. At 100% capacity the dam wall holds back 14,000 megalitres (490×10^{6} cu ft) of water at 187 metres (614 ft) AHD. The surface area of Rocky Lake is 200 hectares (490 acres) and the catchment area is 31 square kilometres (12 sq mi) which includes the Whian Whian State Forest, Nightcap National Park and Whian Whian State Conservation area. The area was once used for logging but is now has a conserved and generally pristine catchment environment. The uncontrolled spillway is capable of discharging 730 cubic metres per second (26,000 cu ft/s).

The vegetation in the catchment is mainly subtropical rainforest or wet sclerophyll. The vegetation community generally reflects the geology and soils in the area which are derived from the Lamington Volcanics which in this area consists of basalt and thick rhyolite rocks erupted from or associated with the Tweed Volcano. The subtropical rainforest is generally regarded as one of the biggest remnants of the Big Scrub rainforest that once existed over a large part of the surrounding region.

The dam is considered small compared to the size of the population it services. However, the secure yield is high because of the catchment's climate with its consistent high annual rainfall. The nearby Rummery Park rain gauge formerly operated by the Bureau of Meteorology has the highest average annual rainfall in New South Wales. However, in 2003 the lack of rain meant that the water level was at one stage less than twenty per cent.

In 2009 the dam wall was upgraded by ensuring the safety of the dam wall during a maximum probable flood. The upgrade involved the removal of the top of the wall, the installation of a concrete cut-off wall keyed into the impermeable clay core, followed by replacement of the gravel and road over the dam wall.

=== Water supply ===
Water from the lake is used as a potable water supply by Rous County Council to the region. It is the primary water source to the centres of Alstonville, Ballina, Byron Bay, Evans Head, and Lismore. Water is pumped from the lake a short distance to the Nightcap Water Treatment Plant and then this water is provided to the region generally through gravity reticulation.

The water available from the Rocky Creek Dam is usually considered very reliable because of the nature of the catchment and the areas climate. However, in 2003 the water level at the dam dropped below 20% and the region was subject to severe water restrictions. Because of this it was decided by Rous County Council to augment the Rocky Creek Dam supply by developing another source on the Wilsons River near Lismore treating it at an upgraded Nightcap Water Treatment plant at Rocky Creek Dam. The emergency Wilsons River source was completed in 2003 and the fully developed Wilsons River source and upgrade of the Nightcap Water Treatment Plant was completed in 2008.

== Recreation ==
Recreation (including swimming and boating) on Rocky Lake is prohibited to protect the high quality of the water in the reservoir. However, a recreational area is provided by Rous County Council near the dam wall including lawns, barbecues, playgrounds, walking tracks (including a board walk and pontoon bridge) and interpretive walks. The lawns near the edge of the lake are often used for weddings. The catchment is mainly under the control of the NSW National Parks & Wildlife Service as national parks and State conservation areas. This means that only passive recreation such as bush walking, bird watching, etc. are permitted. However, swimming, boating, 4WD and dirt bikes are prohibited in the catchment area.

== See also ==
- List of dams and reservoirs in New South Wales
