= Leycester Creek railway bridge =

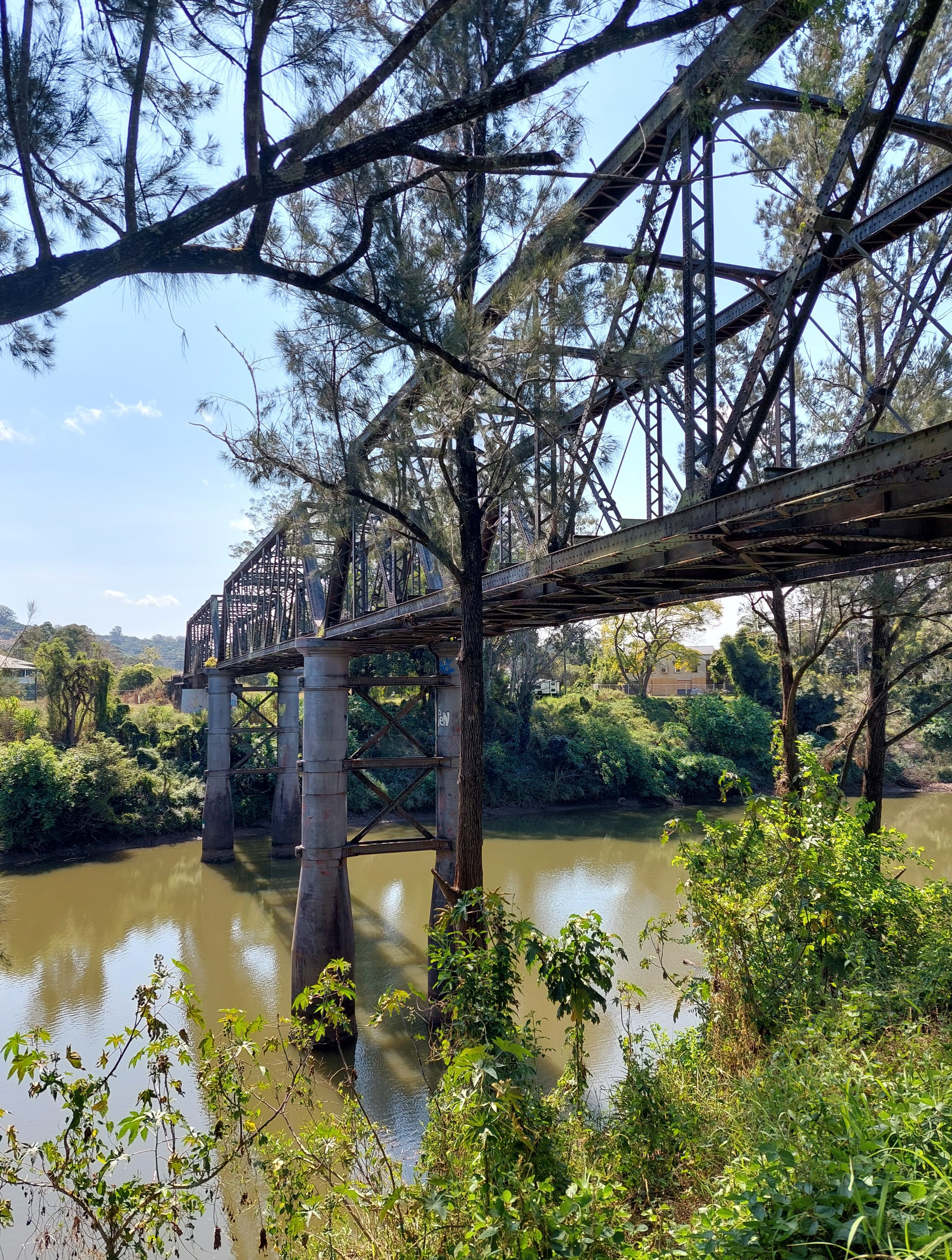
- Leycester Creek railway bridge over Leycester Creek, 2023 (view from Union St. end)
- Coordinates: 28°48′18″S 153°16′22″E
- Carries: Murwillumbah railway line
- Crosses: Leycester Creek
- Locale: Lismore, City of Lismore, New South Wales, Australia
- Owner: Transport Asset Manager of New South Wales
- Followed by: Colemans Bridge

Characteristics
- Design: Truss bridge
- Material: Steel
- Pier construction: Timber
- Longest span: 5.2 metres (17 ft)
- No. of spans: 3

Rail characteristics
- Track gauge: 4 ft 8 1/2 in (1,435 mm) standard gauge

History
- Constructed by: Crosbie, Marquand and Co.
- Construction start: 1891
- Construction end: October 1892
- Construction cost: A£22,110 (Note: Included the cost of construction of the railway bridge over the Wilson River, Lismore.)
- Opened: May 1894

New South Wales Heritage Register
- Official name: Lismore railway underbridges
- Type: State heritage (built)
- Designated: 2 April 1999
- Reference no.: 1044
- Type: Railway Bridge
- Category: Transport – Rail

Location
- Interactive map of Leycester Creek railway bridge

Leycester Creek railway bridge is a heritage-listed railway bridge that carries the closed Murwillumbah railway line across Leycester Creek in Lismore, in the City of Lismore local government area of New South Wales, Australia. The bridge is owned by Transport Asset Holding Entity, an agency of the Government of New South Wales and was added to the New South Wales State Heritage Register on 2 April 1999.

== History ==
The bridge was built by contractors Crosbie, Marquand and Co. The contract included both the Leycester Creek and Wilson's Creek bridges, the contractors accepting A£20,708 to build the two bridges, later increased to A£22,110. Construction suffered various delays, such as damaged and broken iron cylinders, but was finally completed in October 1892. It was claimed at the bridge's completion that it was the first steel bridge in the country. The railway over the bridge opened in May 1894.

The bridge has been disused since the closure of the Murwillumbah railway line in 2004.

== Description ==
The bridge consists of a steel three-span truss, with one 3.7-metre (12 ft), one 4.9-metre (16 ft) and one 5.2-metre (17 ft) spans.

According to the Narrabri to North Star Phase 2 Moree to Camurra North Statement of Heritage Impact, "The Leycester Creek Underbridge at Lismore is a good, intact and representative example of a steel Pratt truss underbridge, one of five built at the inception of the Lismore to Murwillumbah railway line in 1894, and an early example of the introduction of American bridge technology by the NSW Government."

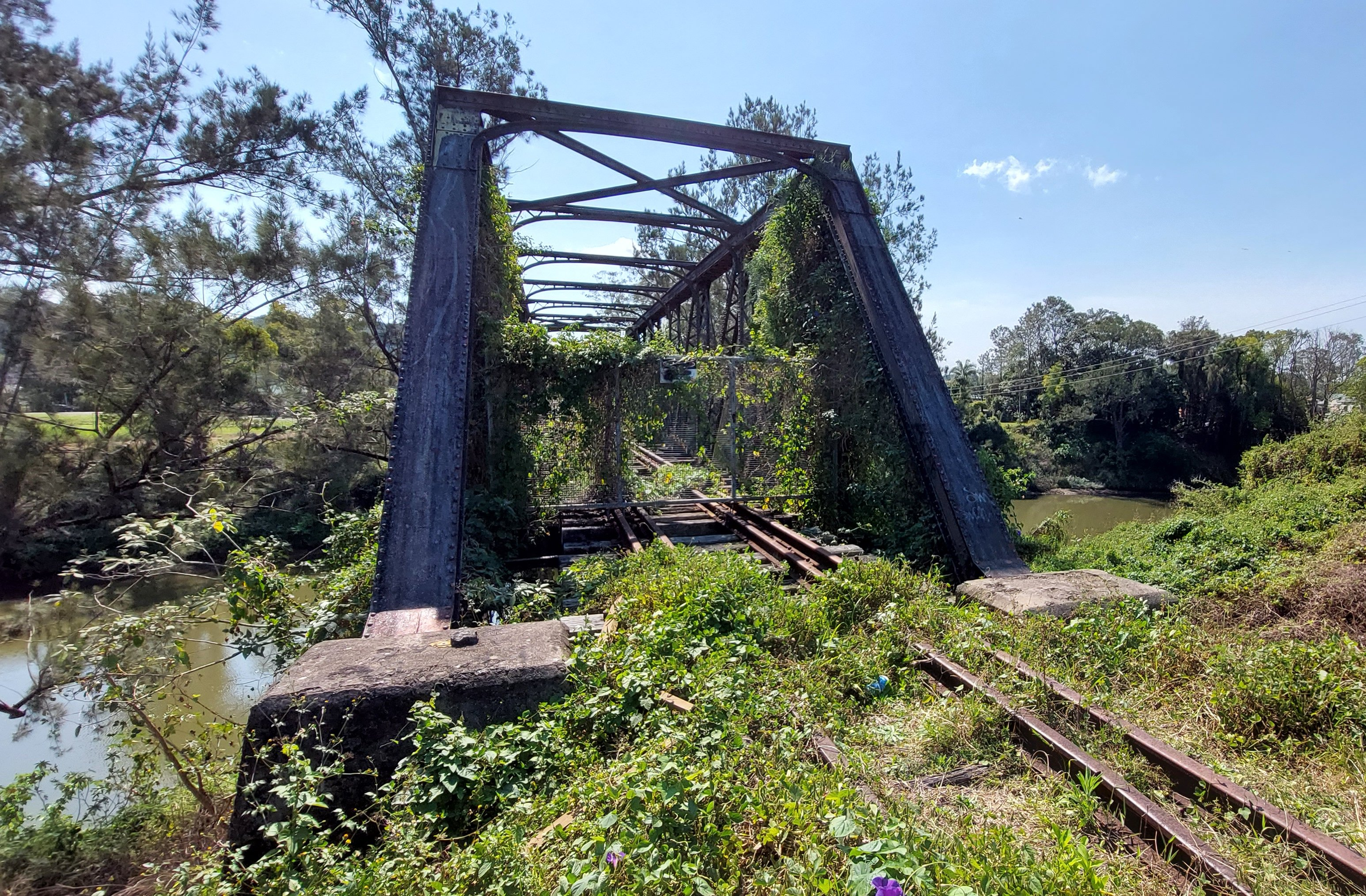
The disused railway line crossing Leycester Creek Bridge, photographed in 2023

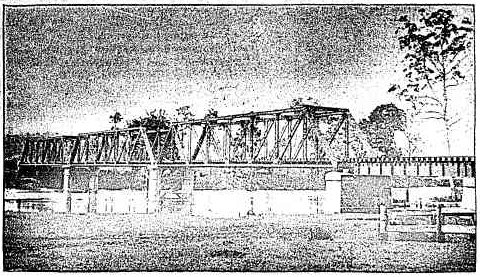
The bridge around the date of its opening in 1894, with Leycester Creek in a "23 ft flood" - from a contemporary newspaper article

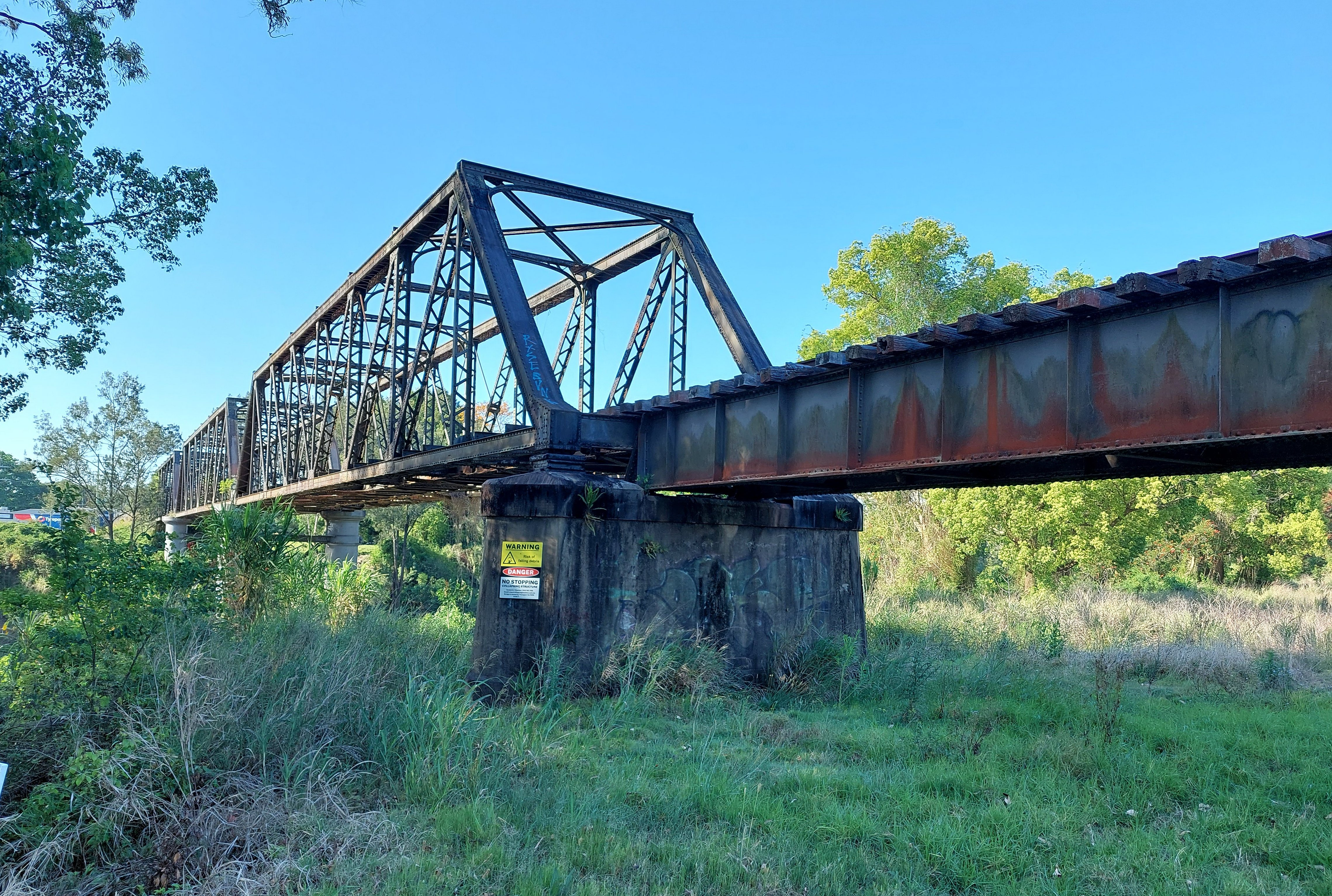
The northern approach to the bridge in 2023

In 2018, The Daily Telegraph reported that according to an assessment it had seen, it would cost in the order of a million (Australian) dollars to bring the bridge up to a satisfactory condition for any possible re-opening.

== Heritage listing ==
This bridge is part of a group named "Lismore railway underbridges" that is included on the NSW State Heritage Register, as item 01044. That listing states: "The Lismore bridges and viaducts are a fine set of bridges all in one location demonstrating the problems of building railways in this flood prone area dating from 1892."

Lismore railway underbridges was listed on the New South Wales State Heritage Register on 2 April 1999 having satisfied the following criteria.

The place possesses uncommon, rare or endangered aspects of the cultural or natural history of New South Wales.

This item is assessed as historically rare. This item is assessed as scientifically rare. This item is assessed as arch. rare. This item is assessed as socially rare.

== See also ==
- Historic bridges of New South Wales
- List of railway bridges in New South Wales
- Colemans Bridge over Leycester Creek
