= Leister (disambiguation) =

A leister is a type of spear used for fishing.

Leister may also refer to:

- Leister Peak, located in Marie Byrd Land, Antarctica
- Trident, a three-pronged spear

People with the surname Leister:

- Brenton Leister (born 1985), English football player
- Frederick Leister (1885–1970), English actor
- John Leister (born 1961), former starting pitcher in Major League Baseball
- Karl Leister (born 1937), world-renowned classical clarinet player

== See also ==
- Leinster
- Leicester
