= Leicester House =

Leicester House may refer to:

- Leicester House, the original name of Essex House (London), London, built c. 1575 and demolished in the 1670s
- Leicester House, Westminster, the house that Leicester Square is named after, built in the 1630s and demolished c. 1791
