= Wilsons River (New South Wales) =

Wilsons River Wilsons Creek, North Arm Richmond River
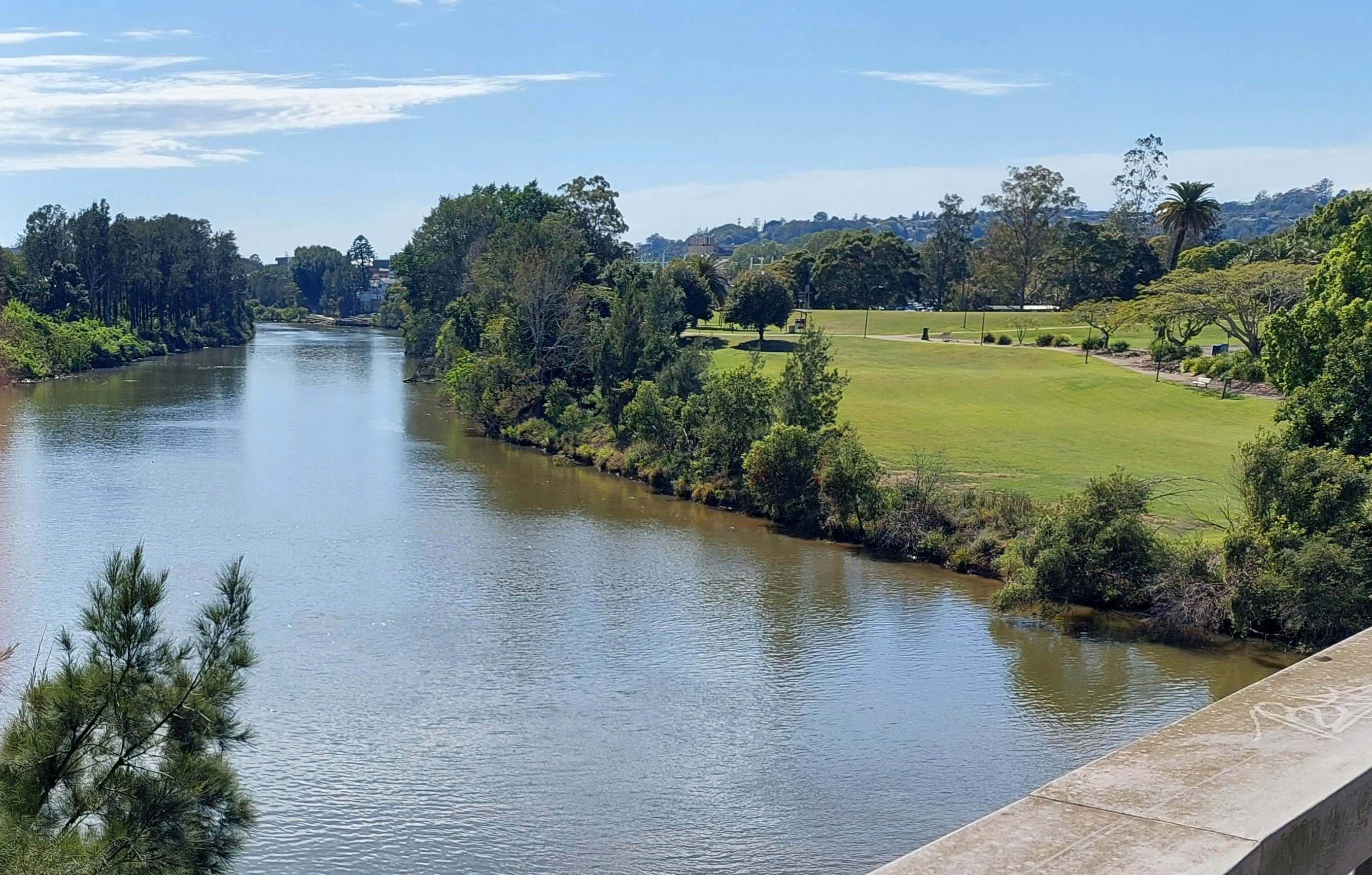
- Wilsons River flowing through Lismore, 2023

- Location of the Wilsons River mouth in New South Wales
- Etymology: In honour of William Wilson

Location
- Country: Australia
- State: New South Wales
- Region: NSW North Coast (IBRA), Northern Rivers
- LGAs: Byron, Richmond Valley, Lismore
- City: Lismore

Physical characteristics
- Source: Nightcap National Park
  - location: near Jerusalem Mountain
  - elevation: 362 m (1,188 ft)
- Mouth: Richmond River
  - location: near Coraki
  - coordinates: 28°59′2″S 153°17′19″E
  - elevation: 3.6 m (12 ft)
- Length: 131 km (81 mi)
- Discharge
  - average: 200 m^{3}/s (7,100 cu ft/s)

Basin features
- River system: Richmond River catchment
- Tributaries
  - left: Byron Creek
  - right: Coopers Creek, Leycester Creek
- Bridges: Upper Wilsons Creek Road bridge; Wilsons Creek Road bridge; Black Bean Road bridge; Lilly Pilly Road bridge; Parmenters Road bridge; Goonengerry Road bridge; Coorabell Road bridge; Waltons Road bridge; O'Meara's Bridge; Bangalow Road bridge (1); Scarrabelottis Road bridge; Booyong Bridge; Railway bridge, Eltham; Eltham Road bridge; Bangalow Road bridge (2); In Lismore: Molesworth Street bridge; Fawcett Bridge; Ballina Street bridge (Bruxner Highway); Wyrallah Ferry Road bridge
- National park: Nightcap National Park

Wilsons River, a perennial river and part of the Richmond River catchment, is situated in the Northern Rivers district of New South Wales, Australia.

== Course and features ==
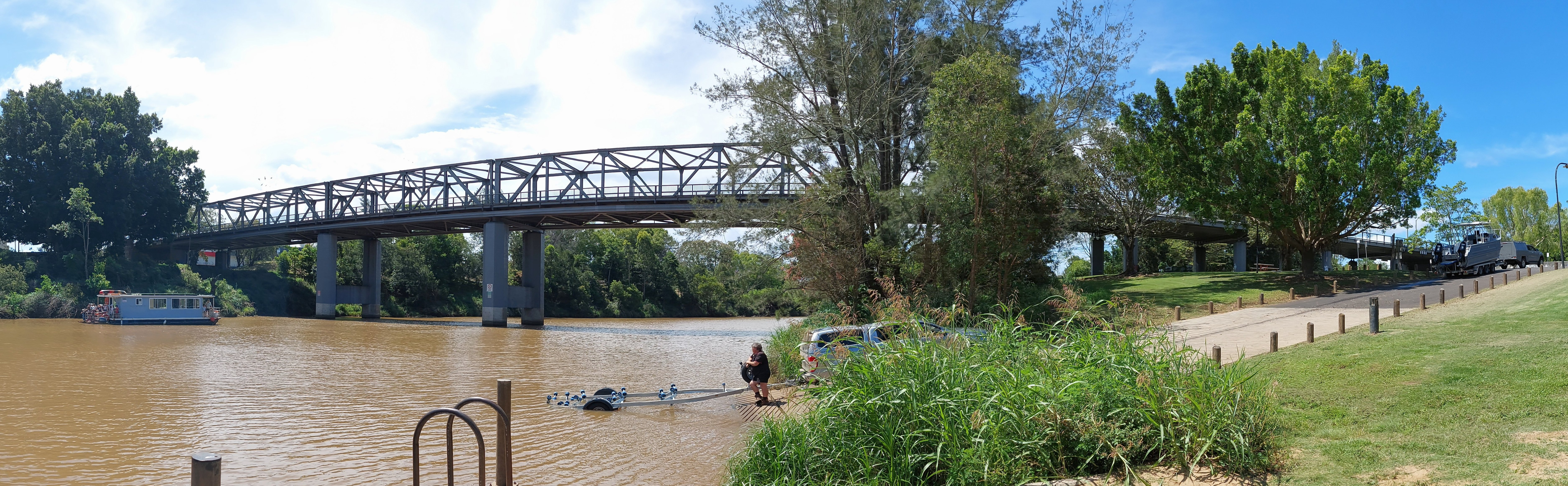
The 1963 Ballina Street road bridge carries the Bruxner Highway across the Wilsons River in Lismore

The river rises on the eastern slopes of Jerusalem Mountain within the Nightcap National Park, and flows generally southeast, west southwest, and south, joined by five minor tributaries, before reaching its mouth at its confluence with the Richmond River, near Coraki, descending 359 metres (1,178 ft) over its 131 kilometres (81 mi) course.

The river passes through the major regional city of Lismore, where it is subject to seasonal flooding.

The traditional custodians of the land surrounding the Wilsons River are the Aboriginal people of the Bundjalung clan, who lived as hunter-gatherers.

Wilsons Creek was named after William Wilson, the first settler in Lismore, in the period 1844–5; and in 1976, the stream was renamed as Wilsons River.

== Environment and ecology ==
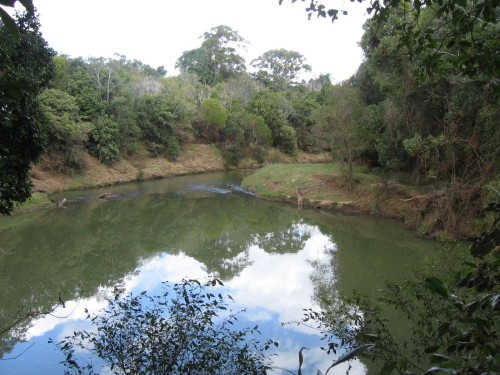
The Wilsons River at Boatharbour Reserve

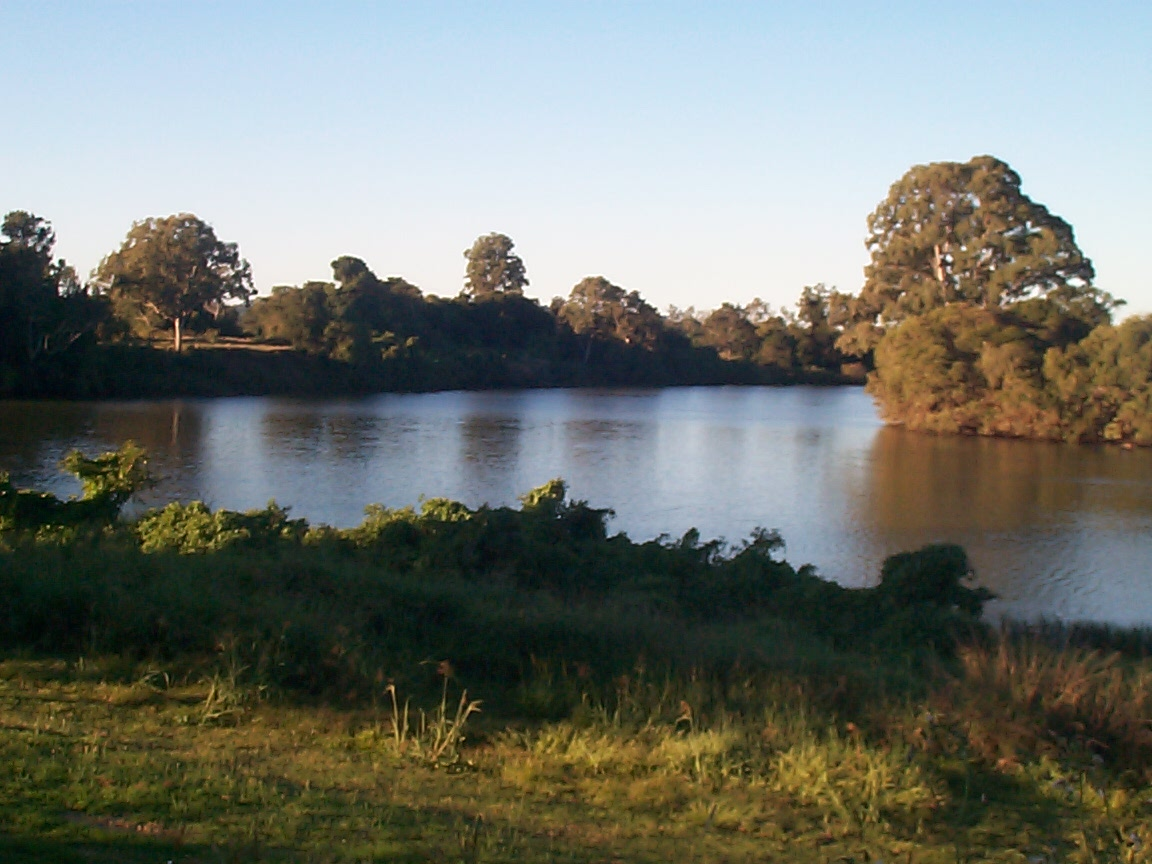
Junction of the Wilson and Richmond rivers at Coraki, 2007

Because of the extensive development of the catchment for agricultural and urban purposes the river system is adversely impacted by inputs of sediments, nutrients, gross pollutants and other contaminants. Efforts by Landcare groups and various government bodies such as the Northern Rivers Catchment Management Authority and Rous Water have been initiated to rehabilitate sections of the river.

New South Wales Fisheries have records that indicate the Eastern freshwater cod once was prevalent in the Wilsons River Catchment but no sightings have been recorded for many years and it is now thought to be locally extinct. In the lower portion of the Wilsons River the declared noxious species European Carp is common. Additionally, there are several species of noxious aquatic weed that occur such as Alligator Weed and Parrots Feather.

== Floods ==
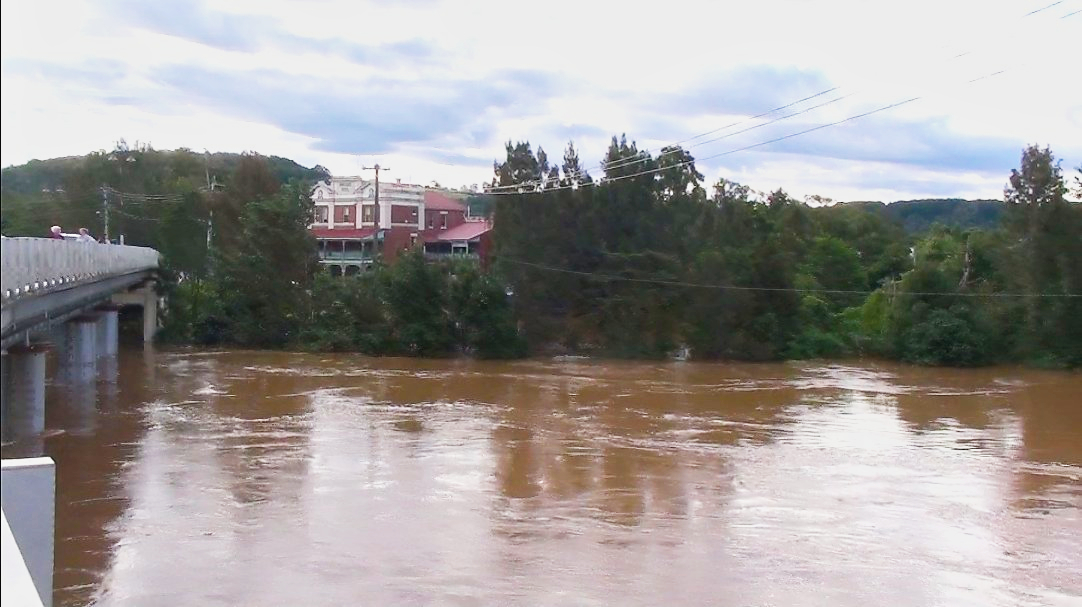
Wilsons River in moderate flood at Lismore, NSW, 5 June 2016

The Wilsons River floods regularly where it is joined by Leycester Creek at Lismore.

The frequency of flooding is due to several contributing factors. One is the relatively high rainfall in the headwaters of the system (The Rummery Park Rain Gauge is the Wettest in NSW) and the unusual geomorphology which means that the River flows away from the sea for a significant distance then south after reaching Lismore before joining the Richmond River which eventually flows north east to the Tasman Sea. In fact the headwaters of the Wilsons River are approximately 180 kilometres (110 mi) from the ocean despite parts of the catchment being less than 2 kilometres (1.2 mi) from the ocean. Additionally, the balance of the catchment is located near sea level reducing the hydraulic gradient and slowing the rate at which water can flow.

The flood plain of the Wilsons River is quite large. The main flood plain starts near the rivers confluence with Byron Creek and extends all the way to Coraki, where it joins the Richmond River and its flood plain. In places the flood plain can be several kilometres wide. The flood plain, like others around the world is generally quite fertile, albeit quite clayey. However, the high frequency of flooding limits its use mainly to pastures for cattle grazing and dairying enterprises.

Between 500 and 740 millimetres (20 and 29 in) of rain fell on 30 March 2017, brought about as a result of the aftermath of Cyclone Debbie, causing the Wilsons River to flood with a peak of 11.6 metres (38 ft) at Lismore the following day, overtopping the 10.6-metre (35 ft)-high levee.

In the devastating floods in 2022, the river peaked at 14.4 m (47 ft) in Lismore, the highest flood peak ever recorded in the town. Several wooden bridges were rebuilt in concrete afterwards, to better withstand flooding.

== Historical river trade ==
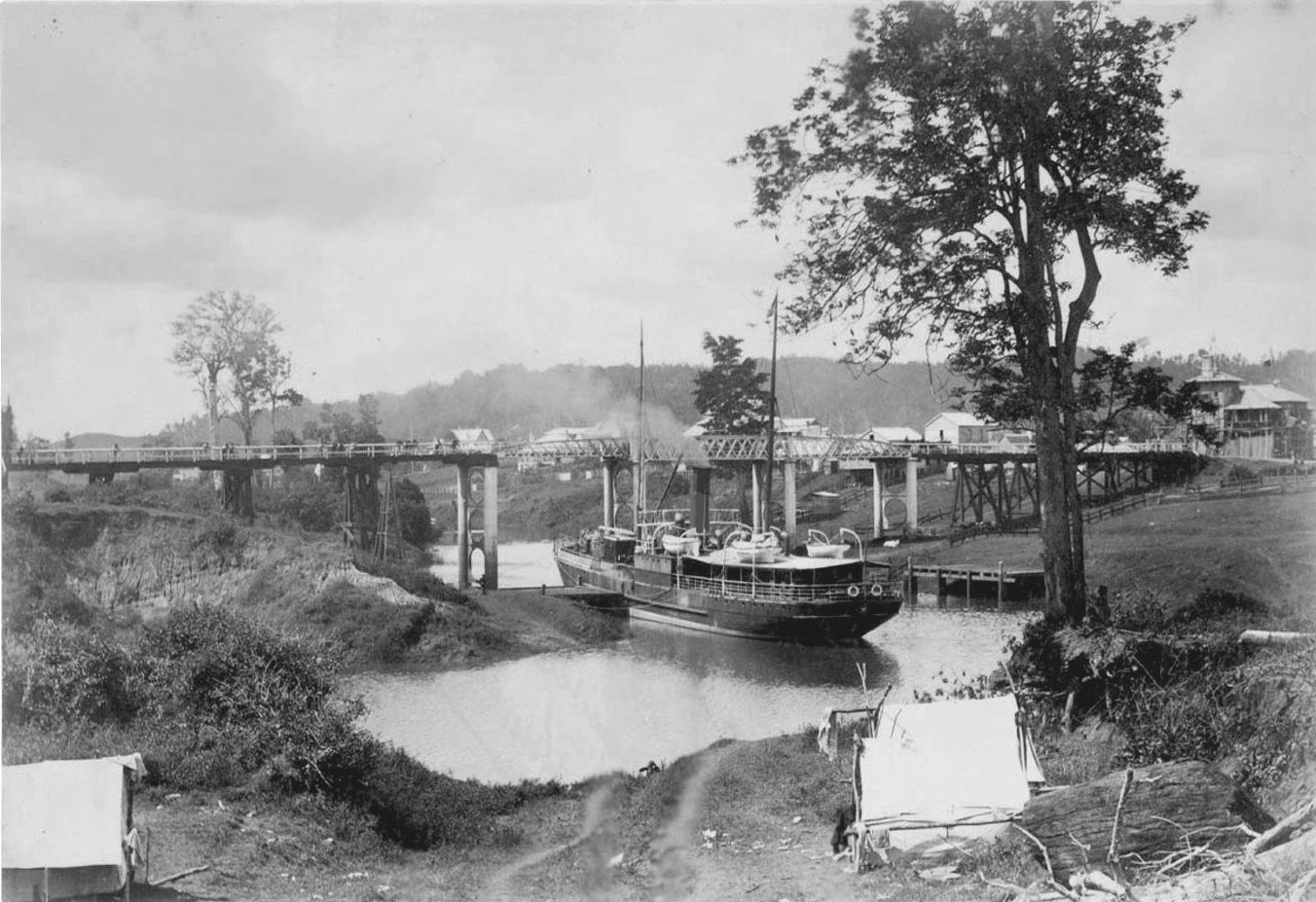
"A Bridge at Lismore" (Fawcett Bridge over the Richmond River North Arm, now Wilsons River), photo c.1901

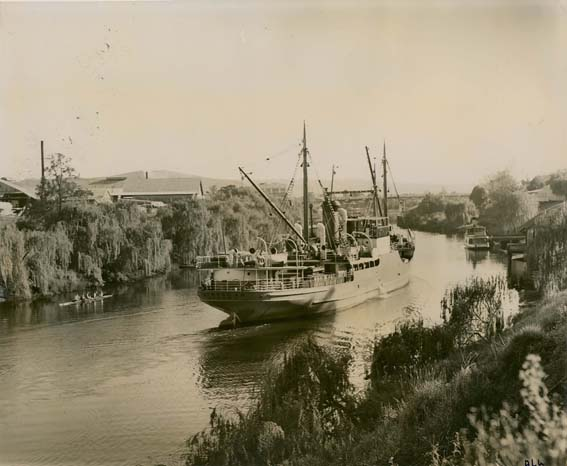
The Wyrallah Richmond River (now Wilsons River), Lismore (NSW) Dated: No date Digital ID: 12932_a012_a012X2445000010

It is likely that the indigenous population of the region would have used canoes and other river craft to transport themselves and trade along the Wilsons River before the appearance of Europeans.

Following the arrival of the first Europeans many of the towns and villages along the Wilsons River including Lismore, Wyrallah, Bexhill and Coraki, were located or developed at their present sites due to the most effective form of transport at the time, river going ships and boats. The Wilsons River, then known as the North Arm of the Richmond River, and the Richmond River itself was named and charted by Henry John Rous in 1828. It was the furthest navigable section of the river system and provided the access necessary for shipping out the region's most valuable commodity at the time with was the red cedar which was to be steadily cut from the Big Scrub subtropical rainforest that once covered most of the region.

Goods regularly transported early in the 20th century included bacon, maize, eggs, butter, tallow, poultry and sawn logs. Ships included the Cavanba, Tomki, City of Grafton and Wyoming.)

The last transport shipping company to operate on the Richmond and Wilsons rivers closed in the 1960s.

== Tributaries ==
The Wilsons River has several tributaries, including Leycester Creek, Coopers Creek, Pearces Creek and Byron Creek; with Leycester Creek the most downstream major tributary. Additionally, there are numerous other smaller named and unnamed tributaries that join the river. Leycester Creek joins the Wilsons River at Lismore which when in flood at the same time can cause higher than expected flooding at the city. This is particularly caused by the angles of confluence which can direct flow towards the main Lismore Levee. The confluence with Coopers Creek is near the village of Bexhill at Boat Harbour Nature Reserve which is one of the largest remnants of the Big Scrub rainforest. It is also the furthest upstream tidal location on the river. Byron Creek has its headwaters 2 kilometres (1.2 mi) from the Tasman Sea. So, like most of the Wilsons River system it is unusual for a coastal river system because if flows inland for a significant distance.

== Water supply ==
The Wilsons River is the source of a potable water for a large part of the region. Byron Shire Council obtain water from Lavertys Gap Weir on the river. This water is treated at the nearby water treatment plant to supply potable water to the town of Mullumbimby.

Rous Water obtain water from the fresh water tidal pool upstream of Lismore to supplement the Rocky Creek Dam supply to large parts of the Byron Shire Council, Ballina Shire, Richmond Valley Council and City of Lismore local government areas. This water is pumped to and treated at the Nightcap Water Treatment Plant near Rocky Creek Dam and is reticulated back to the council areas by gravity.

Farmers in the region also use the Wilsons River to supply water for irrigation (mainly pastures) and for stock watering and some domestic supplies. Water in the Coopers Creek tributary has been historically over-allocated and is therefore the subject of a water sharing plan developed by the NSW Government.

== See also ==
- Rivers of New South Wales
- List of rivers of Australia
