= Leycester, New South Wales =

Locality in New South Wales near Lismore

Leycester is a locality within the City of Lismore local government area in New South Wales, Australia.

Leycester lies on the traditional lands of the Bundjalung people. The locality, like Leycester Creek, was named after early settler and amateur naturalist Augustus Adolphus Leycester, who took up the pastoral lease at Tunstall Station with his partner Robert Shaw. Leycester Creek, then known as Duck Creek, was the northern boundary of Tunstall Station (now Tuncester).

Leycester is a local government area within the City of Lismore. In the 2021 Australian census, there were 146 residents, none of whom identified as Indigenous Australians. Of these, 82.2% were born in Australia.
