= Robert Leicester =

Robert Leicester may refer to:

- Robert Dudley, 1st Earl of Leicester (1532–1588), favourite courtier of Elizabeth I
- Robert de Beaumont, 4th Earl of Leicester (died c. 1204)
- Robert Leicester of the Leicester Baronets

== See also ==
- Earl of Leicester
