= George Leycester =

English cricketer

Personal information
- Full name: George Hanmer Leycester
- Born: 7 July 1763; Simpson, Buckinghamshire, England
- Died: 6 October 1838 (aged 75); Marylebone, Middlesex, England
- Role: Occasional wicket-keeper

Domestic team information
- Years: Team
- 1790–1808: Marylebone Cricket Club (MCC)
- 1791–1808: Surrey
- 1791–1807: Hampshire

George Hanmer Leycester (12 July 1763 — 6 October 1838) was an English amateur cricketer who made 50 known appearances in important matches between 1790 and 1808.

== Life and cricket ==
The son of The Reverend Ralph Leycester and Susanna Hanmer, he was born at in July 1763 at Simpson, Buckinghamshire. He came of the well-known Cheshire family, the Leycesters of Tabley.

Leycester was educated at Eton College, before matriculating to Christ Church, Oxford in 1782; however, he gained his degree from Merton College, Oxford in 1788 and his master's in 1790. A student Lincoln's Inn, he was called to the bar in the same year that he gained his master's degree.

Leycester was one of the leading cricketers in the final decade of the 1700s and the first decade of the 1800s. He made his debut in important matches in 1790 for the Marylebone Cricket Club (MCC) against Hornchurch at Lord's Old Ground. Leycester was mainly associated with Surrey and the MCC, but also represented Hampshire, amongst other teams. He was an occasional patron of cricket, his own team appearing in an important match in 1802. Leycester played for the Gentlemen in the inaugural and second Gentlemen v Players matches in 1806. In 50 important matches, Leycester scored 922 runs at an average of 10.35 with a highest score of 49.

Leycester died at his Portland Place residence in October 1838; he was survived by his widow, Charlotte Jemima.

== External sources ==
- George Leycester at Cricinfo
