= Leycester Creek =

Coordinates: 28°47′S 153°14′E

Leycester Creek Hanging Rock Creek, Terania Creek

Location
- Country: Australia
- State: New South Wales
- Region: South East Queensland (IBRA), Northern Rivers
- Local government area: Richmond Valley

Physical characteristics
- Source: Tweed Range
  - location: near Green Pigeon Mountain, Nimbin
  - elevation: 388 m (1,273 ft)
- Mouth: confluence with the Wilsons River
  - location: Lismore
  - elevation: 3 m (9.8 ft)
- Length: 69 km (43 mi)

Basin features
- River system: Richmond River catchment
- Tributaries
  - left: Terania Creek
  - right: Back Creek, Jeffries Creek (New South Wales)

The Leycester Creek, formerly known as Duck Creek, is a perennial stream of the Richmond River catchment, is located in Northern Rivers region in the state of New South Wales, Australia.

== History ==
The name of the creek originates from early settler Augustus Adolphus Leycester, who took up the pastoral lease at Tunstall Station with his partner Robert Shaw. Leycester Creek, then known as Duck Creek, was the northern boundary of Tunstall Station (now Tuncester).

Cubawee Aboriginal reserve was situated on the creek near Tuncester. On 7 May 2010, Cubawee was pronounced an Aboriginal Place under the NSW National Parks and Wildlife Act 1974.

The creek is prone to flooding at its confluence with Wilsons River at Lismore, and there were devastating floods in 2022 which spilled over both banks near the town of Lismore. The Walsh Bridge on Rosehill Road at Tuncester, formerly a wooden bridge, was rebuilt in concrete in 2023, to better withstand flooding.

== Location and features ==
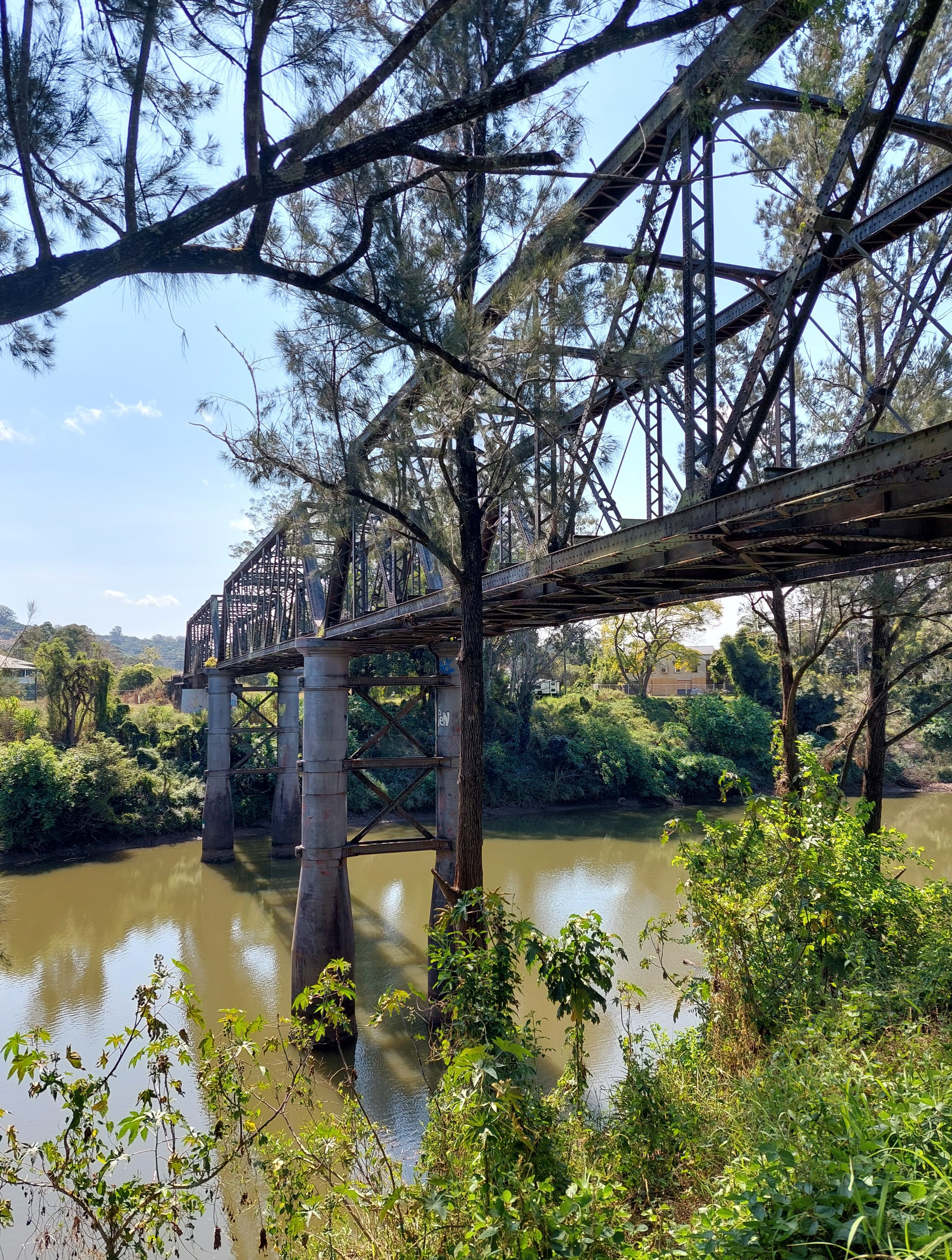
Leycester Creek railway bridge, carrying the now closed Murwillumbah railway line across the Creek, close to its junction with the Wilsons River

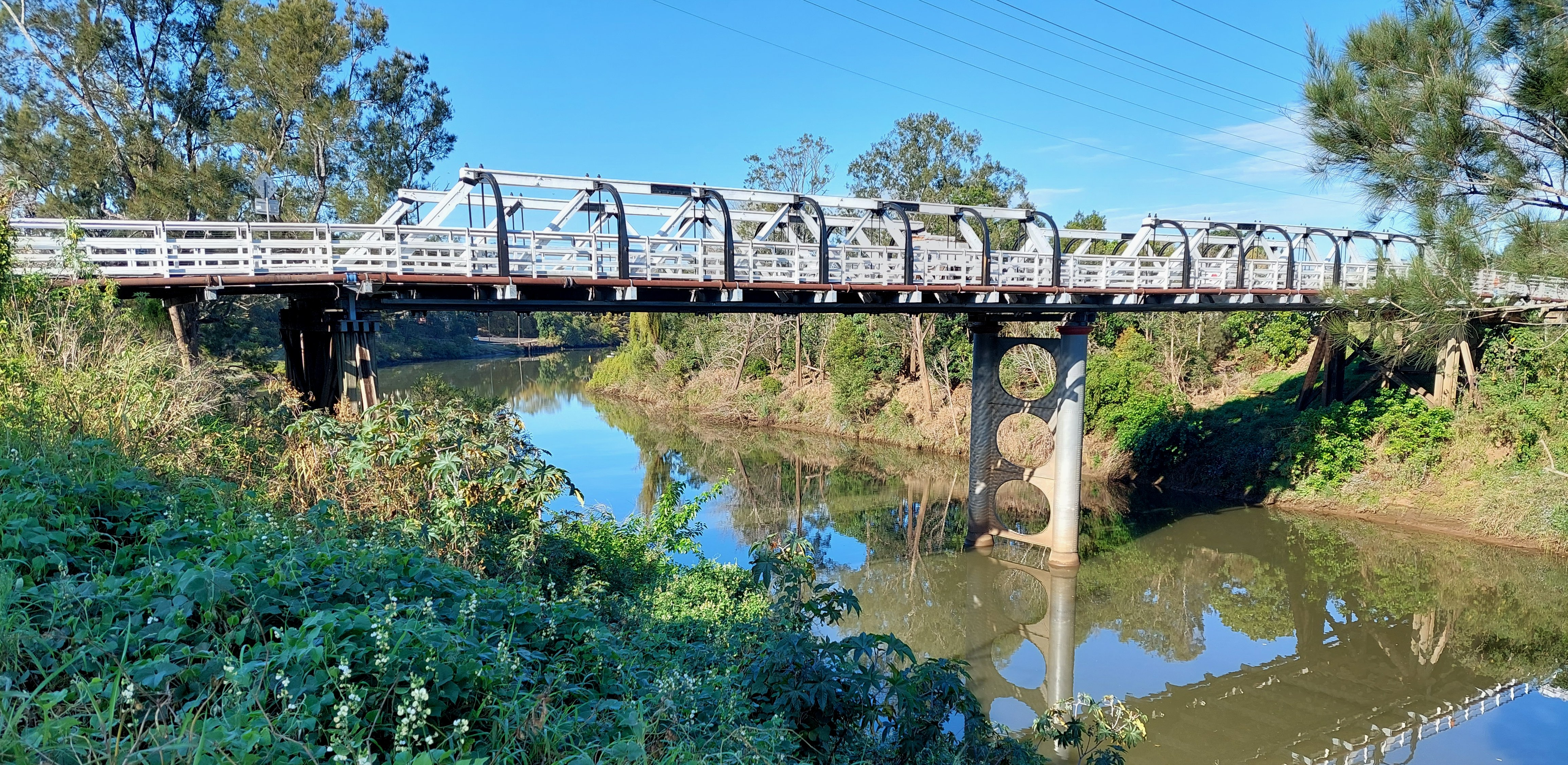
Colemans Bridge over Leycester Creek

Leycester Creek rises below Lofts Pinnacle on the southern extremity of Tweed Range about 4.5 kilometres (2.8 mi) east by north of Green Pigeon Mountain, in remote country, north northwest of Nimbin. The river flows generally south and then east, joined by three tributaries, including Back Creek, before reaching its confluence with the Wilsons River at the town of Lismore. The river descends 386 metres (1,266 ft) over its 69 kilometres (43 mi) course.

== See also ==
- Rivers of New South Wales
- List of rivers of New South Wales (L-Z)
- List of rivers of Australia
