= Results of the 2012 New South Wales local elections in Mid North Coast =

2012 New South Wales local elections in the Mid North Coast
- 8 September 2016

This is a list of results of the 2012 New South Wales local elections in the Mid North Coast region.

== Coffs Harbour ==
2012 Coffs Harbour City Council election

All 9 seats on Coffs Harbour City Council
- Mayor
	First party	Second party	Third party
	IND	IND
Candidate	Denise Knight	Keith Rhoades	John Arkan
Party	Unaligned	Unaligned	Liberal
Primary vote	7,710	7,671	7,646
Percentage	20.0%	19.9%	19.7%
Swing	▲20.0	▼16.8	▲1.8
TCP	52.2%		47.8%
Mayor before election
Keith Rhoades
Independent
Elected Mayor
Denise Knight
Unaligned
- Councillors
- All 8 Councillors (out of 9 seats) on Coffs Harbour City Council
- Turnout: 80.6%
Party	Vote %	Seats	+/–
Independents	64.0	5	−1
Liberal	19.1	2	+1
Greens	11.0	1	0
This lists parties that won seats. See the complete results below.

Cr. Rodney Degens who was elected on the Greens ticket in 2008 left the party and became an Independent on 19 June 2011.

=== Coffs Harbour mayoral results ===
2016 New South Wales local elections: Coffs Harbour Mayor
Party	Candidate	Votes	%	±%
Liberal (Group E)	1. John Arkan (elected 1); 2. Mark Sultana (elected 7); 3. Graeme Ness; 4. Sarah Rose	7,079	19.1	
Independent (Group D)	1. Keith Rhoades (elected 2); 2. Kerry Hines; 3. Andrea Caldwell; 4. Fiona Barden	6,237	16.8	
Independent (Group C)	1. ~~Denise Knight~~ (elected mayor); 2. Gary Innes (elected 3); 3. Michael Oates; 4. Maureen Burgess	6,144	16.6	
Greens (Group F)	1. Sally Townley (elected 4); 2. Mark Graham; 3. Craig Christie; 4. Aina Ranke	4,061	11.0	−7.4
Independent (Group I)	1. Rod Degens (elected 5); 2. Justin Squires; 3. Adam Hill; 4. Dusty Blakemore; 5. Adam Sherwell	3,303	8.9	
Independent (Group A)	1. Bob Palmer (elected 6); 2. Mike Newcombe; 3. Ray Smith; 4. Elizabeth Soltau	2,704	7.3	
Independent (Group B)	1. Nan Cowling (elected 8); 2. John Donaldson; 3. Mick Randall; 4. Colin Brissett	2,643	7.1	
Country Labor (Group H)	1. David Quinn; 2. Richard McLaughlin; 3. Christopher McDonald; 4. Kerrie Burnet	2,190	5.9	
Independent (Group G)	1. Robert McClennon; 2. Eliezer Robinson; 3. Darren Leaney; 4. George Hardacre	1,933	5.2	
Independent	Ian Sutherland	355	1.0	
Independent	Peter Davies	195	0.5	
Independent	Graham Whelan	161	0.4	
Independent	Paul Templeton	23	0.1	
Total formal votes		37,028	90.9	
Informal votes		3,718	9.1	
Turnout		40,746		

=== Coffs Harbour mayoral results ===
2016 New South Wales local elections: Coffs Harbour Mayor
Party	Candidate	Votes	%	±%
Independent	Denise Knight	7,710	20.0	+20.0
Liberal	John Arkan	7,646	19.8	+1.8
Independent	Keith Rhoades	7,671	19.9	−16.8
Independent	Rodney Degens	4,306	11.2	+11.2
Greens	Sally Townley	3,369	8.7	+8.7
Independent	Bob Palmer	3,171	8.2	+8.2
Independent	John Donaldson	2,397	6.2	+6.2
Independent	Leo Muller	2,274	5.9	+5.9
Total formal votes		38,544	94.7	−0.9
Informal votes		2,159	5.3	+0.9
Turnout		40,703		
Two-candidate-preferred result
Independent	Denise Knight	11,900	52.2	
Liberal	John Arkan	10,908	47.8	
Denise Knight win		Swing		
