= Coffs Harbour Shire =

Local government area in NSW, Australia

Coffs Harbour Shire New South Wales
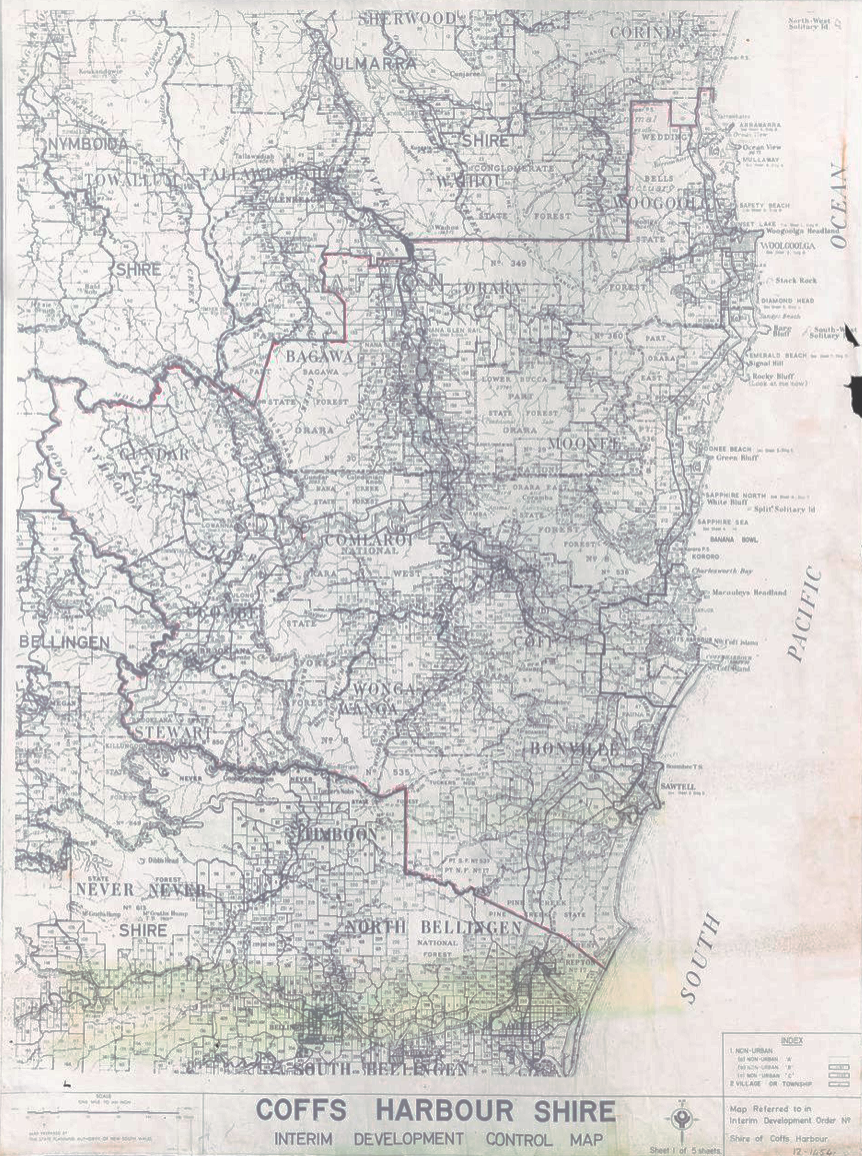
- Map of Coffs Harbour Shire
- Coordinates: 30.3042°S 153.0951°E
- Population: 14,514 (1961)
  - Density: 15.135/km^{2} (39.198/sq mi)
- Established: 1 January 1957
- Abolished: 1 September 1987
- Gazetted: 30 November 1956
- Area: 959 km^{2} (370.3 sq mi)
- Council seat: Coffs Harbour
- Region: Mid North Coast

Coffs Harbour Shire was a local government area in the Mid North Coast region of New South Wales, Australia.

Coffs Harbour Shire was established on 1 January 1957. It was first gazetted and announced on 30 November 1956. Its area was approximately 959 km^{2} (370 sq mi).

The council seat of Coffs Harbour Shire was located on Vernon Street, Coffs Harbour. Other towns within the shire include Sawtell, Mullaway, Kororo, Moonee Beach and Woolgoolga.

According to the census, in 1961 the population of Coffs Harbour Shire was 14,516.

The shire was made a city with the creation of the City of Coffs Harbour on 1 September 1987.

== History ==
In the late 1940s and early 1950s it was wanted for Coffs Harbour and surrounds to become a municipality or shire. One 1954 newspaper states, "Why we want the Bellingen kid, now he’s big and earns a quid." This is referring to the town of Sawtell which was thought could be beneficial if Coffs Harbour Shire was created.
