= Isola Bella =

Isolabella or Isola Bella may refer to:

== Places ==
=== Italy ===
- Isolabella, Turin, an Italian municipality in the Metropolitan City of Turin, Piedmont
- Isolabella, Cisterna di Latina, a village in the town of Cisterna di Latina, Province of Latina, Lazio
- Isola Bella (Lago Maggiore), one of the Borromean islands of Lago Maggiore, near Stresa
- Isola Bella (Sicily), island off the east coast of Sicily, near Taormina

=== United States ===
- Isola Bella, popular name for the James Johnston House in Brentwood, Tennessee

== Other ==
- Isola Bella (film), a 1961 West German film
- Isolabella (earwig), a genus of earwig in the subfamily Labiinae
