= Boambee, New South Wales =

Boambee Coffs Harbour, New South Wales
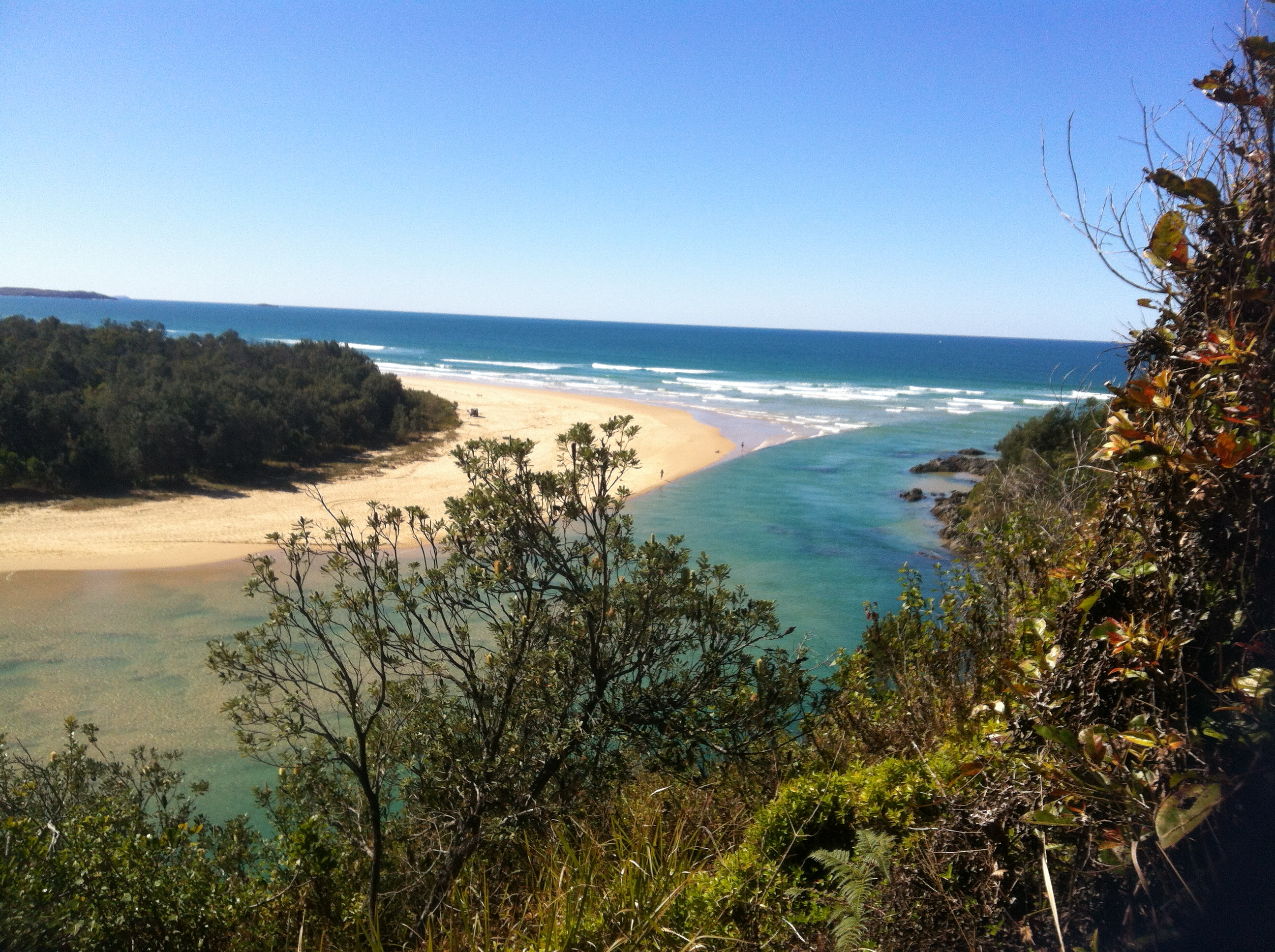
- Boambee Bay

- Coordinates: 30°20′05″S 153°03′32″E
- Population: 1,770 (SAL 2021)
- LGA(s): City of Coffs Harbour
- State electorate(s): Electoral district of Coffs Harbour
- Federal division(s): Division of Cowper
Suburbs around Boambee:
Karangi, New South Wales	Coffs Harbour
	Boambee
	Bonville, New South Wales	Toormina, New South Wales

Boambee is a suburb in the city of Coffs Harbour on the Mid North Coast of New South Wales, Australia. Boambee is west of Sawtell on the Pacific Highway. It is divided into two sections: semi-rural Boambee (2450) and the more suburban Boambee East (2452). These suburbs are divided by the Pacific Highway. In 2011, Boambee had a population of 1,545 people, while Boambee East had a population of 5,446 people.

The Boambee State Forest is located to the north-west of Boambee's residential areas.

== History ==
=== Industry ===
1882 saw the establishment of the first sugar mill in Boambee by James Newport, who was the first to grow sugar cane in the region. August Schneider opened another mill in 1883.

=== Railway ===
Boambee railway station was opened in August 1917, closing in 1946. In the years prior to 1917 the area had been served by a siding.

Preceding station	Former services	Following station
Coffs Harbour towards Brisbane	North Coast Line	Sawtell towards Maitland

=== Schools ===
Boambee Half-Time School opened in February 1902 and continued as such until closing in April 1906. The closure was short-lived, being re-opened as Boambee Provisional School in May 1906. This was converted to a Public School in July 1907 suggesting that the school population had increased to the twenty required at the time for the creation of a public school.

== Population ==
In the 2016 Census, there were 1,668 people in Boambee. 81.7% of people were born in Australia and 88.5% of people spoke only English at home. The most common responses for religion were No Religion 26.3%, Catholic 21.9% and Anglican 20.8%.
