= Mat Ryan (rugby league) =

Australian rugby league footballer and administrator

Personal information
- Full name: Matthew Ryan
- Born: 21 May 1913; Albury, New South Wales, Australia
- Died: 29 October 1994 (aged 81); Toormina, New South Wales, Australia

Playing information
- Position: Centre
Club
| Years | Team | Pld | T | G | FG | P |
|---|---|---|---|---|---|---|
| 1936 | St. George | 10 | 4 | 14 | 0 | 40 |
Representative
| Years | Team | Pld | T | G | FG | P |
| 1936 | Metropolis | 1 | 1 | 0 | 0 | 3 |
- Relatives: Bill Ryan (brother)

Matthew 'Mat' Ryan (1913–1994) was an Australian rugby league player who played in the 1930s.

Ryan followed his brother Bill Ryan to St. George from the local Leeton rugby league club. Both brothers hailed from Junee, New South Wales. Ryan played one season for the Saints before leaving Sydney.

Ryan died on 29 October 1994 at Toormina, New South Wales.
