= Florence Trevelyan =

Cornish gardener and conservationist

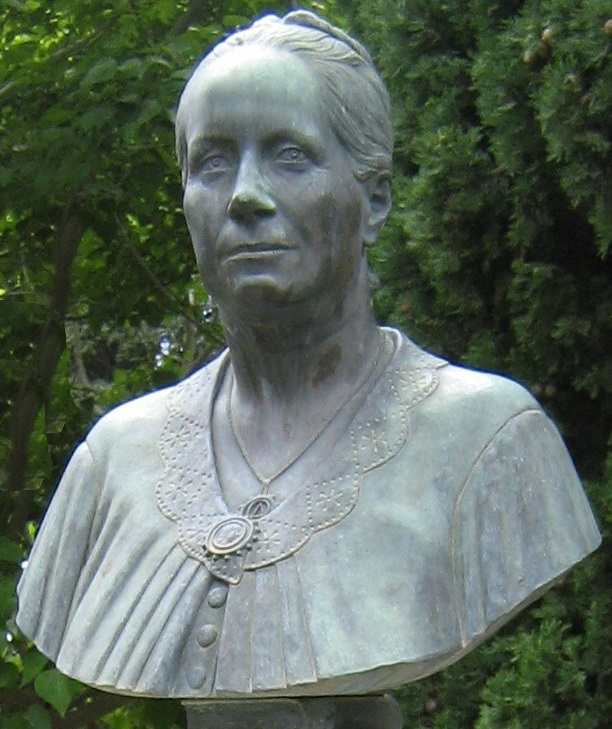
- Born: 7 February 1852; Newcastle upon Tyne, England
- Died: 4 October 1907 (aged 55)
- Occupation: Gardener

Florence Trevelyan (1852–1907) of Taormina, Sicily, was an English gardener, builder of follies and pioneering wildlife conservationist.

== Origins ==
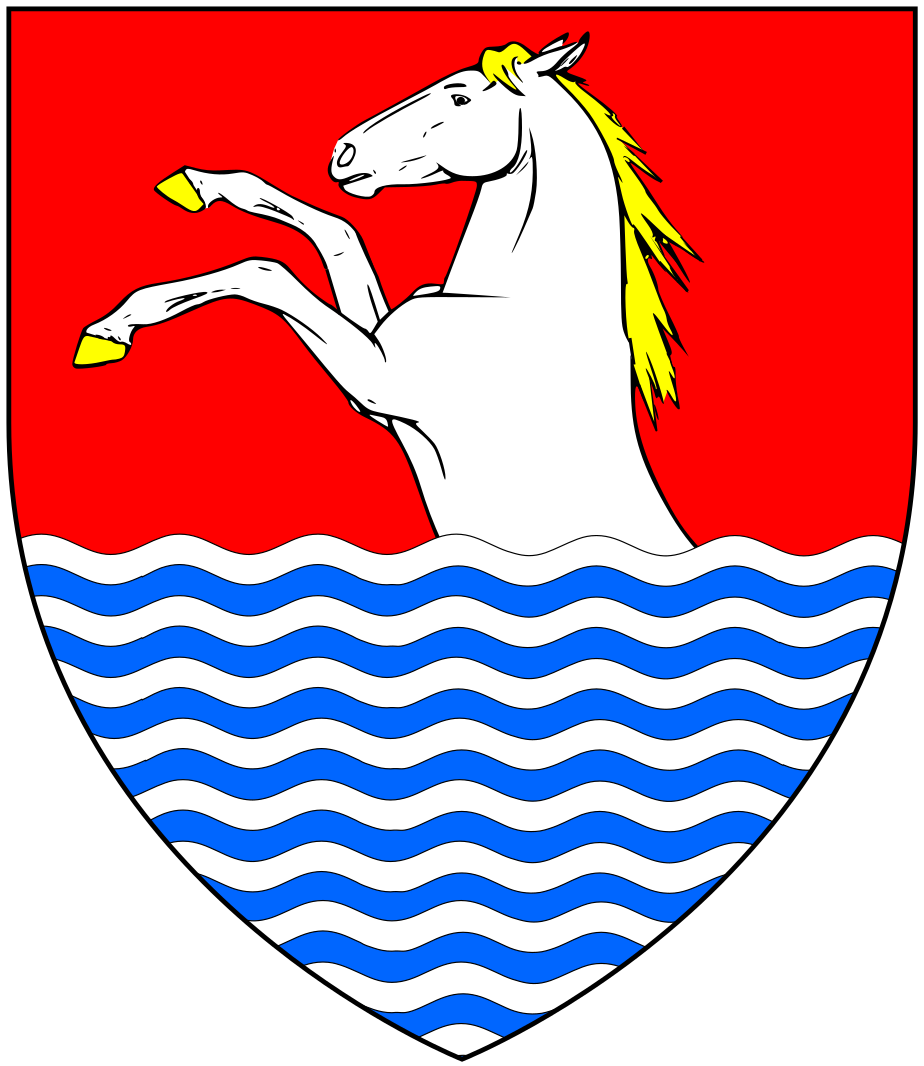
Arms of Trevelyan: Gules, a demi-horse argent hoofed and maned or issuing out of water in base proper

She was born on 7 February 1852 in Newcastle upon Tyne and was baptised (as "Florence Trevelyan Trevelyan", her second name intended for retention after marriage) at St. Andrew's Church, Hartburn, Northumberland. She was the only surviving child of Edward Spencer Trevelyan (4th son of Sir John Trevelyan, 5th Baronet "of Nettlecombe in the County of Somerset" of Nettlecombe and of Wallington Hall in Northumberland) of Hallington Hall, Northumberland (about 6 miles south-west of Wallington), by his wife Catherine Ann Forster. Her father's childless eldest brother Sir Walter Calverley Trevelyan, 6th Baronet bequeathed Wallington to his junior first cousin Charles Edward Trevelyan, whilst Nettlecombe and the baronetcy descended to his nephew Sir Alfred Wilson Trevelyan, 7th Baronet (1831–1891). Florence, although senior to her first cousin the 7th Baronet, as a female was passed over in the succession to these family estates.

== Career ==
Her father committed suicide in 1854 when Florence was aged two. Florence and her mother remained at Hallington Hall, where they appear to have taken a keen interest in establishing the pleasure gardens. After her mother's death in November 1877, and having inherited Hallington Hall, Florence and her first cousin, Harriet Perceval (a granddaughter of the Prime Minister Spencer Perceval) toured Europe for about two years, and Florence eventually settled at Taormina in Sicily in 1884, which she made her permanent home.

=== Rumour of royal scandal ===
The Taorminese lawyer and journalist Dino Papale, whose maternal grandfather was Cesare Acrosso (1898-1990) (Podesta of Taormina, nephew and heir of Salvatore Cacciola), who resides in the former Trevelyan palazzo in Via Teatro Greco, wrote a book published in 1995 called Taormina Segreta - La Belle Epoque 1876-1914, in which he claims that the young Florence was expelled by Queen Victoria from the English royal court and high-society, due to an affair she supposedly had with Prince Edward, the queen's eldest son and the future King Edward VII.

== Life in Taormina, Sicily ==
=== Isola Bella ===
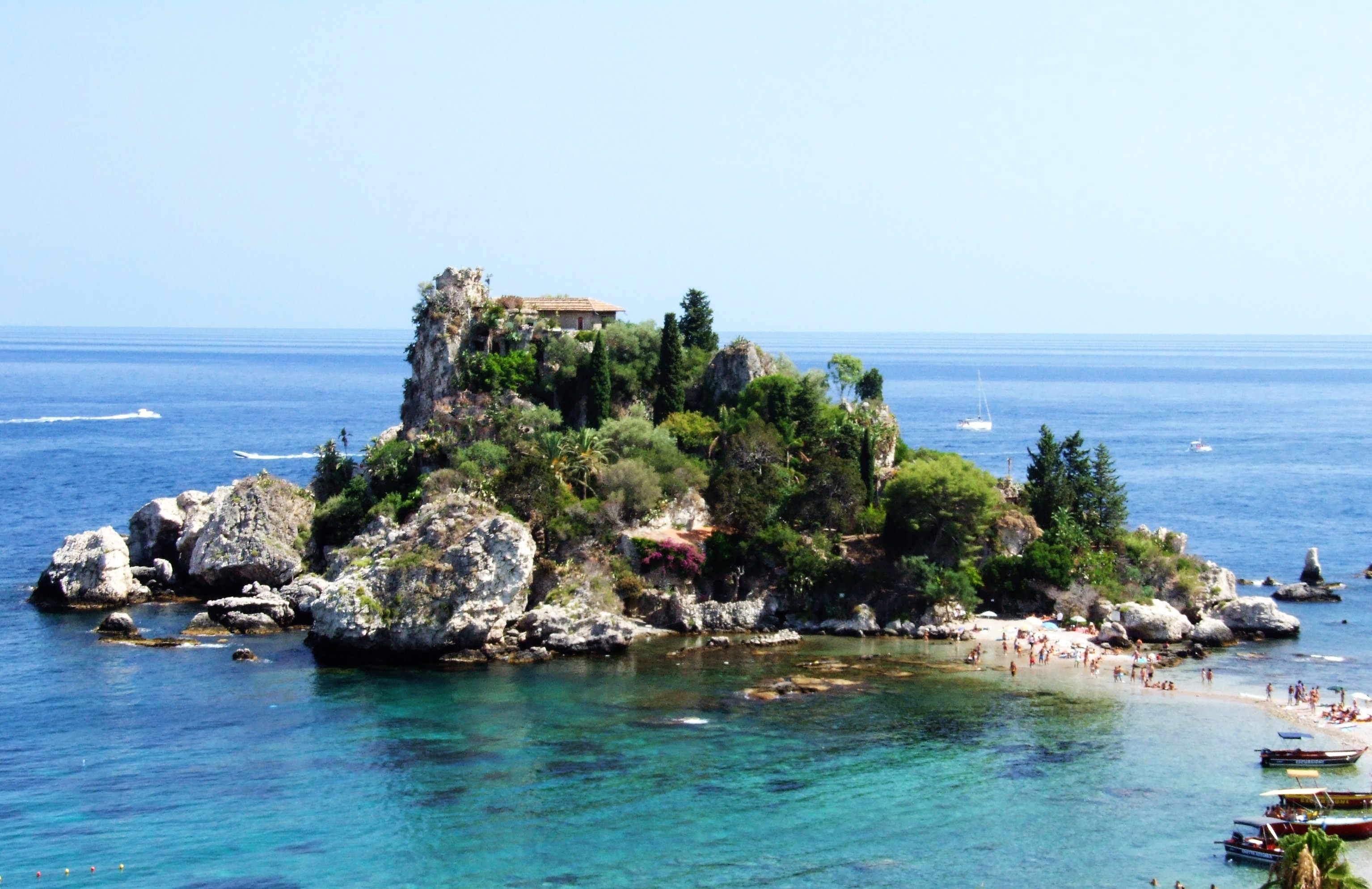
The Isola Bella, below Taormina

In 1890 she purchased the Isola Bella, a small rocky island below the town of Taormina, attached to the mainland by a narrow sandy path, on which she built a house and established a garden. In among the native Mediterranean plants she planted non-native trees, rare shrubs and grasses. It became the home of various sea birds and some interesting lizards. After Florence's death Isola Bella stayed in private hands until 1990 when it was taken over by the Regional Government of Sicily which designated it a Nature Reserve. It is maintained under the auspices of the World Wide Fund for Nature.

=== Hallington Siculo ===
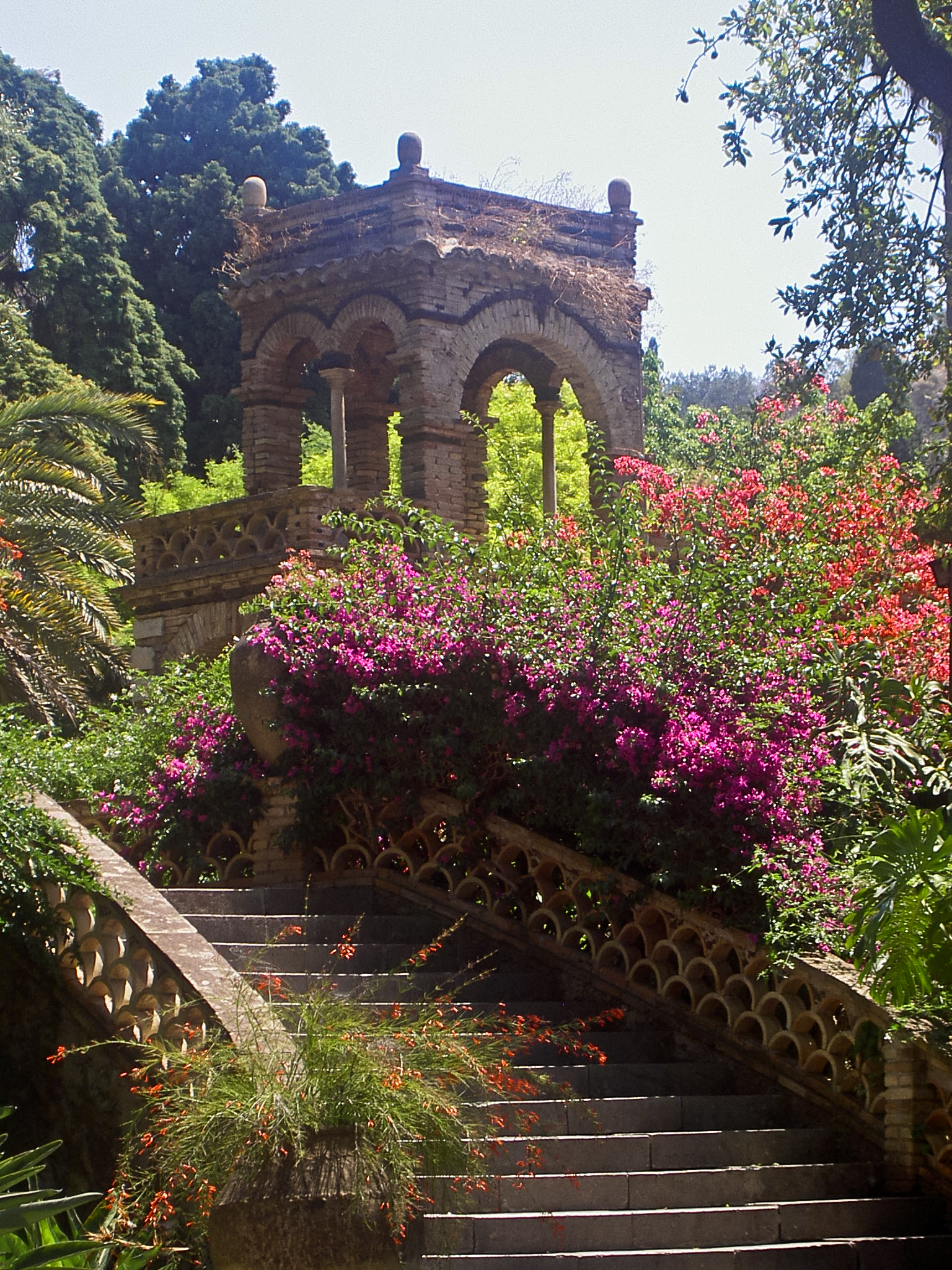
One of Florence Trevelyan's "follies" in the Giardino Pubblico, Taormina, Sicily, being one of the smaller examples

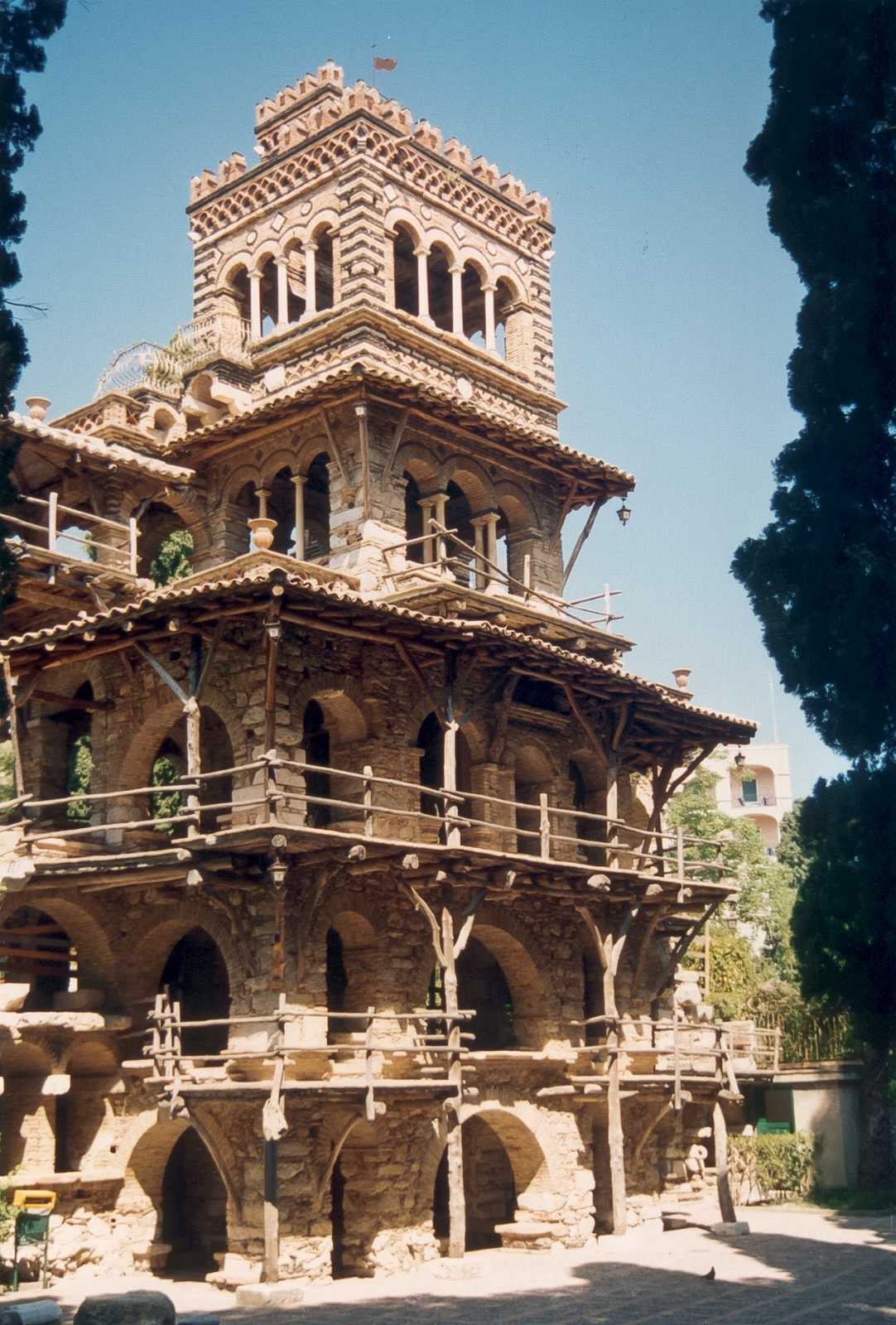
The largest of Florence Trevelyan's "follies" in the Giardino Pubblico, Taormina

In 1890 she married Salvatore Cacciola, a doctor and well-known resident of Taormina who served for many years as its mayor, and moved into a residence in the town. There she acquired several parcels of land on the steep hillside below the Via Bagnoli Croce down to Giardini on the coast, and below the famous Hotel Timeo, where she had first resided in Taormina. There she embarked on the creation of another garden, which she named Hallington Siculo ("Sicilian Hallington") after her childhood home in England. This was a private and shaded pleasure garden from which there are views of both the sea and of Mount Etna. Again she imported non-native plants, but the garden is most noteworthy for the extraordinary and eclectic follies constructed from different kinds of stone, cloth, brick, pipes and other architectural salvage. These she called "the hives" and used as observation points for bird-watching and "as a quiet place to have her tea". She built as her marital residence a substantial villa on Via Teatro Greco, now known as Palazzo Acrosso-Papale near to the Hotel Timeo.

After Florence's death the land was expropriated by the municipality of Taormina and is now part of the Giardino Pubblico called "Parco Florence Trevelyan", a larger municipal park. This unique garden is the second biggest tourist attraction in Taormina after the Greek Theatre and, together with the Isola Bella, receives thousands of visitors a year.

=== Wildlife conservation ===
She was a pioneer of bird habitat conservation in Italy for the benefit of ornithology rather than for shooting opportunities. LIPU Lega Italiana Protezione Uccelli (Italian League for the Protection of Birds) was not founded until 1965. All the real estate bequests in her will contain the proviso that the legatee should not cut down trees, cultivate land or build houses in any portion of lands she owned in England or in Sicily. She also imposed on those who inherited Hallington Siculo garden and Isola Bella island the obligation of not killing any wild bird or young bird which may be found ... but cats, rabbits, ravens and falcons must be shot as they are destructive to the little birds and trees. Also all animals and birds, viz. dogs, goats, parrots, peacocks, pigeons, doves, canaries and all other birds of whatever description shall be maintained in health and comfort, with all care and affection, as they have been kept in my lifetime, and that they shall not suffer in any respect.

== Marriage ==
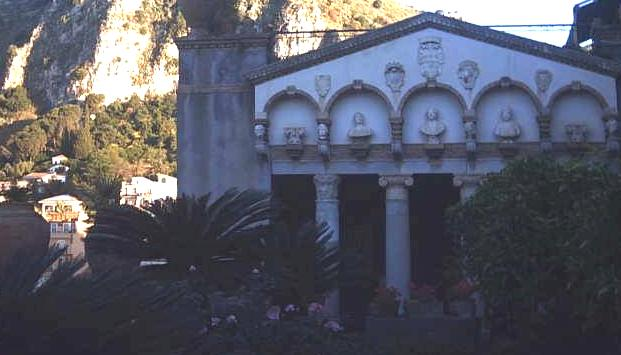
Masonic temple in the garden of Palazzo Acrosso Papale, Via Teatro Greco, Taormina, the residence of Florence and her husband. Incorporating ancient Greco-Roman columns, family heraldry, with central marble bust of Cacciola, and to his right a bust of his first wife Florence Trevelyan, to his left of his second wife Ida Mosca, his housekeeper

In 1890 she married Professor Salvatore Cacciola (d.1926), a medical doctor and well-known resident of Taormina who served for many years as its mayor (sindaco), whom she had met seeking veterinary advice due to her "soft heart for stray dogs". He had studied in Malta where he had learned English. A freemason, he built in his garden the first freemasons' lodge of Taormina. He desired to be buried in an anonymous grave in order to "continue to be next to the humble to whom he had always been close". Florence's only child died at birth, after which she became a recluse. Her husband's heir was his nephew Cesare Acrosso (1898-1990), a lawyer and the last podestà of Taormina who due to his office was imprisoned by the British for 18 months in 1943 on the re-taking of Sicily. He donated many of Florence's properties to the town of Taormina.

== Death, burial and succession ==
Florence died on 4 October 1907 in Taormina, and as she requested in her will was buried in a mausoleum on her property at Mendecino/Menticino on Monte Venere near the village of Castelmola above the town. In the mausoleum is a marble bust of her, resting on four books, made by her husband, of which a bronze copy is now displayed in the Giardino Pubblico. She left her property firstly to her husband and then, after his death, to Robert Calverley Trevelyan who is known to have visited her in Taormina. After his death it passed to his brother George Macaulay Trevelyan.

== Memorials ==
Her contribution to the life and economy of Taormina has been recognised in books including: Giacoma Gandolfo, Lady Florence Trevelyan, una nobildonna inglese dell'Ottocento e la sua incantevole seconda patria Taormina, 2013; Cinzia Aloisi, Florence Trevelyan, 2013; and in a film Florence the Lady of Flores, directed by Giacoma Gandolfo, 59th Taormina Film Festival, 2013. A bronze bust of Florence Trevelyan survives in the Giardino Pubblico in Taormina. Her library is preserved in Vassar College of New York.
