= Bill Ryan (rugby league) =

Australian rugby league footballer (1911-1994)

Personal information
- Full name: William Joseph Ryan
- Born: 20 July 1911 Albury, New South Wales, Australia
- Died: 9 July 1994 (aged 82) Brisbane, Queensland, Australia

Playing information
- Position: Second-row, Fullback, Centre
Club
Years	Team	Pld	T	G	FG	P
1931–32	Western Suburbs	16	5	3	0	21
1935	St. George	7	1	3	0	9
1936–41	Ipswich
	Total	23	6	6	0	30
Representative
Years	Team	Pld	T	G	FG	P
1932	New South Wales	1	0	0	0	0
1932	Metropolis	2	1	0	0	3
1932	NSW City	1	0	0	0	0
1933	NSW Country	1	0	0	0	0
1936–41	Queensland	6	0	17	0	34
- Source: As of 8 May 2019
- Relatives: Mat Ryan (brother)

Bill Ryan nicknamed "Bricky" was an Australian rugby league footballer who played in the 1930s and 1940s. He played for Western Suburbs and St. George in the New South Wales Rugby League (NSWRL) competition.

== Playing career ==
Ryan originally came from Junee and signed with Western Suburbs in 1931. Ryan made his first grade debut that year against Newtown in Round 6 1931 at Marrickville Oval.

In 1932, Ryan played 11 games as Western Suburbs finished second on the table behind South Sydney. Wests went on to reach the 1932 NSWRL grand final against Souths. Wests won the match 23-8 with Ryan scoring a try. In the aftermath of the result, Souths exercised their right to challenge as the rules at the time allowed the minor premiers to ask for a rematch. In the grand final replay, Ryan played at second-row as Wests were defeated 19-12 at the Sydney Sports Ground. Ryan also represented New South Wales, Metropolis and NSW City in 1932.

Ryan then left Western Suburbs and returned the country competitions playing for Temora, Leeton and Cootamundra. Ryan was selected to represent NSW Country in 1933. In 1935, Ryan returned to Sydney and played one season with St George but the club missed out on playing in the finals coming 6th. His younger brother, Mat Ryan also played with St. George the following year.

Ryan then moved north to Queensland and signed with Ipswich in the Brisbane competition. Between 1936 and 1941, Ryan was selected to play for Queensland on six occasions.
