= City of Coffs Harbour =

- Local government area
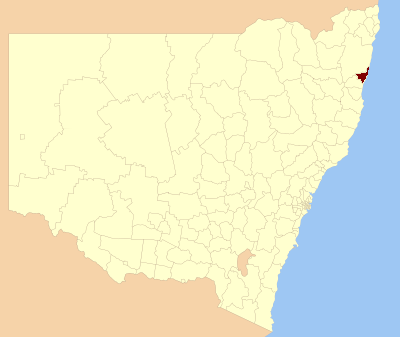
- Location in New South Wales

- Interactive map of City of Coffs Harbour
- Coordinates: 30°19′S 153°07′E
- Country: Australia
- State: New South Wales
- Region: Mid North Coast
- Established: 1 September 1987
- Council seat: Coffs Harbour

Government
  - Mayor: Nikki Williams (Independent National)
  - State electorate: Coffs Harbour
  - Federal divisions: Cowper; Page

Area
  - Total: 1,175 km^{2} (454 sq mi)

Population
  - Totals: 72,944 (2016 census); 78,759 (2021)
  - Density: 62.080/km^{2} (160.79/sq mi)
- Mean max temp: 27 °C (81 °F)
- Mean min temp: 6.6 °C (43.9 °F)
- Annual rainfall: 1,647.3 mm (64.85 in)
- Website: City of Coffs Harbour
LGAs around City of Coffs Harbour
Clarence Valley	Clarence Valley	Tasman Sea
Clarence Valley	City of Coffs Harbour	Tasman Sea
Bellingen	Bellingen	Tasman Sea

The City of Coffs Harbour (also known as the Coffs Harbour City Council) is a local government area in the Mid North Coast region of New South Wales, Australia. The area under administration is 1,175 square kilometres (454 sq mi), expanded in 2004 to take in parts of the former Pristine Waters local government area.

The administrative seat is located in Coffs Harbour; and the area is adjacent to the Pacific Highway, and the North Coast railway line.

The mayor of the City of Coffs Harbour is Nikki Williams, who is an Independent National politician.

== Towns and localities ==
Towns and localities in the City of Coffs Harbour are listed below.

=== Coffs Harbour suburbs ===
- Coffs Harbour
- Boambee
- Boambee East
- Bonville
- Brooklana
- Bucca
- Coramba
- Corindi Beach
- Crossmaglen
- Emerald Beach
- Karangi
- Korora
- Lowanna
- Nana Glen
- Timmsvale
- Toormina
- Upper Orara

=== Other ===
- Arrawarra
- Corindi
- Emerald Beach
- Moonee Beach
- Mullaway Beach
- Red Rock
- Sandy Beach
- Sapphire Beach
- Sawtell
- Toormina
- Ulong
- Upper Corindi
- Woolgoolga

== Heritage listings ==
The City of Coffs Harbour has a number of heritage-listed sites, including:

- High Conservation Value Old Growth forest
- Coffs Harbour Regional Museum

== Demographics ==
At the 2011 census, there were 68,413 people in the Coffs Harbour local government area, of these 48.5% were male and 51.5% were female. Aboriginal and Torres Strait Islander people made up 4.1% of the population, nearly double the national average. The median age of people in the City of Coffs Harbour was 42 years; some five years higher than the national median. Children aged 0 – 14 years made up 19.2% of the population and people aged 65 years and over made up 18.0% of the population. Of people in the area aged 15 years and over, 48.4% were married and 14.8% were either divorced or separated.

Population growth in the City of Coffs Harbour between the 2001 Census and the 2006 census was 11.94%; and in the subsequent five years was 5.40%. When compared with total population growth of Australia for the same periods, being 5.78% and 8.32% respectively, population growth in the Coffs Harbour local government area was higher than the national average. The median weekly income for residents within the City of Coffs Harbour was slightly below the national average.

At the 2011 census, the proportion of residents in the Coffs Harbour local government area who stated their ancestry as Australian or Anglo-Celtic exceeded 82% of all residents (national average was 65.2%). In excess of 55.4% of all residents in the City of Coffs Harbour nominated a religious affiliation with Christianity at the 2011 census, which was slightly above the national average of 50.2%. Meanwhile, as at the Census date, compared to the national average, households in the Coffs Harbour local government area had a lower than average proportion (6.6%) where two or more languages are spoken (national average was 20.4%); and a significantly higher proportion (90.3%) where English only was spoken at home (national average was 76.8%). A significant exception was that households in the Coffs Harbour local government area where Punjabi was spoken was three times the national average.

Selected historical census data for Coffs Harbour local government area
Census year		2001	2006	2011	2016
Population	Estimated residents on census night	61,186	64,910	68,413	72,944
Population	LGA rank in terms of size within New South Wales			30th	
Population	% of New South Wales population			0.99%	
Population	% of Australian population	0.33%	0.33%	▼0.32%	
Cultural and language diversity					
Ancestry, top responses	Australian			31.5%	
Ancestry, top responses	English			31.2%	
Ancestry, top responses	Irish			9.0%	
Ancestry, top responses	Scottish			7.7%	
Ancestry, top responses	German			3.2%	
Language, top responses (other than English)	Punjabi	1.0%	1.0%	▲1.3%	
Language, top responses (other than English)	German	0.4%	▲0.5%	0.5%	
Language, top responses (other than English)	Italian	0.4%	0.4%	0.4%	
Language, top responses (other than English)	Dinka	n/c	n/c	▲0.2%	
Language, top responses (other than English)	French	n/c	n/c	▲0.2%	
Religious affiliation					
Religious affiliation, top responses	Anglican	28.9%	▼27.1%	▼24.5%	
Religious affiliation, top responses	No Religion	14.5%	▲18.5%	▲23.1%	
Religious affiliation, top responses	Catholic	23.2%	▼23.0%	▼22.2%	
Religious affiliation, top responses	Uniting Church	6.2%	▼5.0%	▼4.4%	
Religious affiliation, top responses	Presbyterian and Reformed	5.1%	▼4.6%	▼4.3%	
Median weekly incomes					
Personal income	Median weekly personal income		A$364	A$469	
Personal income	% of Australian median income		78.1%	81.3%	
Family income	Median weekly family income		A$706	A$1,097	
Family income	% of Australian median income		68.7%	74.1%	
Household income	Median weekly household income			A$902	
Household income	% of Australian median income		77.7%	73.1%	

== Council ==
=== Current composition and election method ===
Coffs Harbour City Council is composed of nine councillors, including the mayor, for a fixed four-year term of office. The mayor is directly elected while the eight other councillors are elected proportionally as one entire ward. The most recent election was held on 14 September 2024, and the makeup of the council is as follows:

Party	Councillors
Team Nikki Williams	4
Team Moose Group	2
Better Coffs Coast Group	1
Labor	1
Greens	1
Total	9

The current Council, elected in 2024, in order of election, is:

Councillor	Party	Notes
Nikki Willams	Independent	Mayor; Team Nikki Williams
Cath Fowler	Independent	Team Nikki Group
Paul Amos	Independent	Team Moose Group
Les Oxford	Independent	Team Nikki Group
Julie Sechi	Independent	Team Moose Group
Gurminder Saro	Independent	Team Nikki Group
Jonathan Cassell	Greens	
George Cecato	Independent	Better Coffs Coast Group
Tony Judge	Labor	

== Election results ==
=== 2024 ===
2024 New South Wales local elections: Coffs Harbour
Party	Candidate	Votes	%	±%
Team Nikki	1. Nikki Williams; 2. Cath Fowler (elected 1); 3. Les Oxford (elected 3); 4. Gurminder Saro (elected 5); 5. Matt Gosling; 6. Falak Othman; 7. Clinton Hayes; 8. Barbara Haigh; 9. Neil Manson	15,428	34.1	
Team Moose	1. Paul Amos (elected 2); 2. Julie Sechi (elected 4); 3. Scott Wolgamot; 4. Sally Townley	10,361	22.9	+0.4
Labor	1. Tony Judge (elected 6); 2. Htun Htun Oo; 3. Lealah Durow; 4. Glenis Hunter; 5. Danny Wilson	4,356	9.6	−1.0
Greens	1. Jonathan Cassell (elected 7); 2. Tim Nott; 3. Eugenie Gerlach; 4. Elaine Sherwood; 5. Olivier La Mer-Adair	3,956	8.6	−0.3
Better Coffs Coast	1. George Cecato (elected 8); 2. Jesse Young; 3. Jeffrey (Jack) Dix; 4. Tiga Cross; 5. Matthew Culgan; 6. Katherine Listkow	3,798	8.4	−5.8
Together We Thrive	1. Tegan Swan; 2. Marcus Blackwell; 3. Lucas Craig; 4. Lisa Nichols; 5. Mel Browne	3,677	8.1	−2.5
Independent	1. Rodney Fox; 2. Nicole Bourne; 3. Michael Thompson-Blair; 4. Dudley Mitchell-Adams	2,992	6.6	
Independent	1. John O'Brien; 2. Jasmine Braun; 3. Dorothea Skoludek; 4. Kristel O'Brien	626	1.4	
Total formal votes		45,194	91.5	
Informal votes		4,206	8.5	
Turnout		49,400	83.8	

=== 2021 ===
Elected councillor	Party
Scott Wolgamot	Team Moose
George Cecato	Coffs Coast First
Rodger Pryce	TWFI
Tegan Swan	Ind. National
Tony Judge	Labor
Julie Sechi	Team Moose
Jonathan Cassell	Greens
Sally Townley	Independent (Group F)

2021 New South Wales local elections: Coffs Harbour
Party	Candidate	Votes	%	±%
Team Moose		9,838	22.6	
Together We'll Fix It		6,316	14.5	
Coffs Coast First		6,192	14.2	
Independent National		4,638	10.6	
Labor		4,623	10.6	
Independent (Group F)		4,047	9.3	
Greens		3,933	9.0	
Independent (Group E)		1,743	4.0	
Independent (Group A)		1,704	3.9	
Independent	Donna Pike	413	0.9	
Liberal Democrats		140	0.3	
Total formal votes		43,587	92.7	
Informal votes		3,410	7.3	
Turnout		46,997	82.9	

== Sister city ==
The city of Coffs Harbour has one sister city:

- Sasebo, Japan

== See also ==
- Coffs Harbour Shire
- Local government in New South Wales
