= Isola Bella (Sicily) =

Island in Sicily, Italy

Coordinates: 37°51′01″N 15°18′03″E

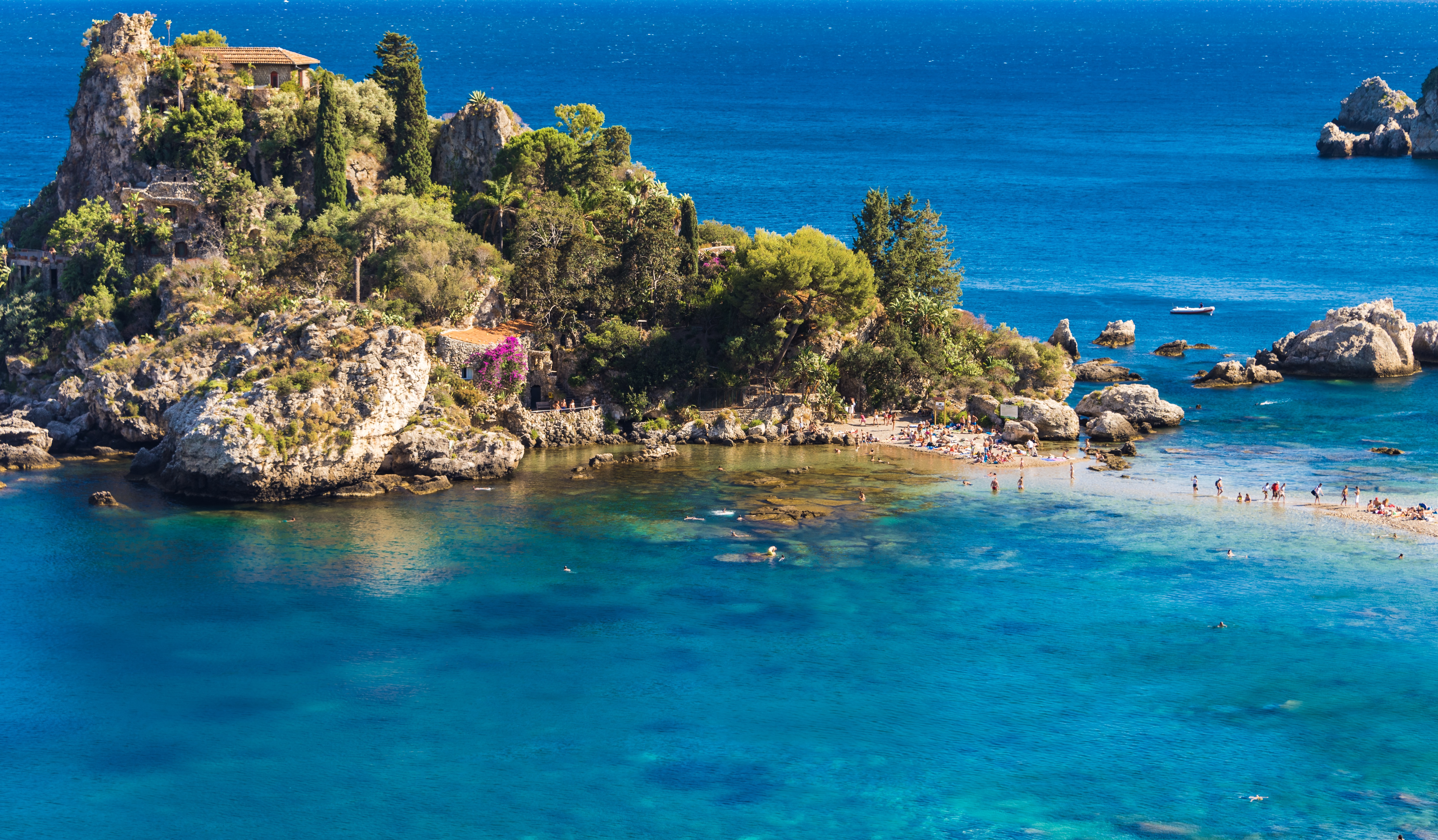
Isola Bella Taormina

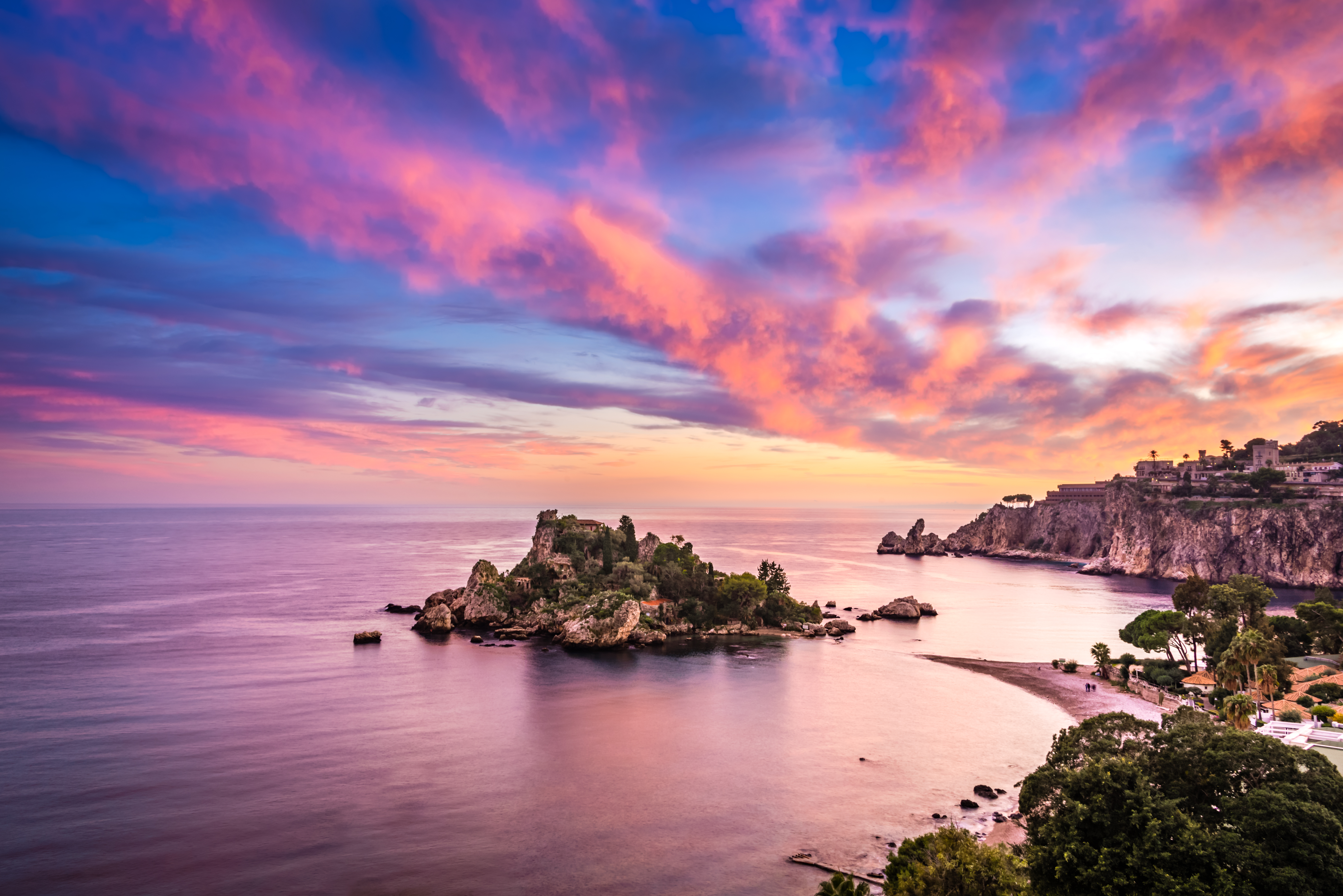
Isola Bella during the night

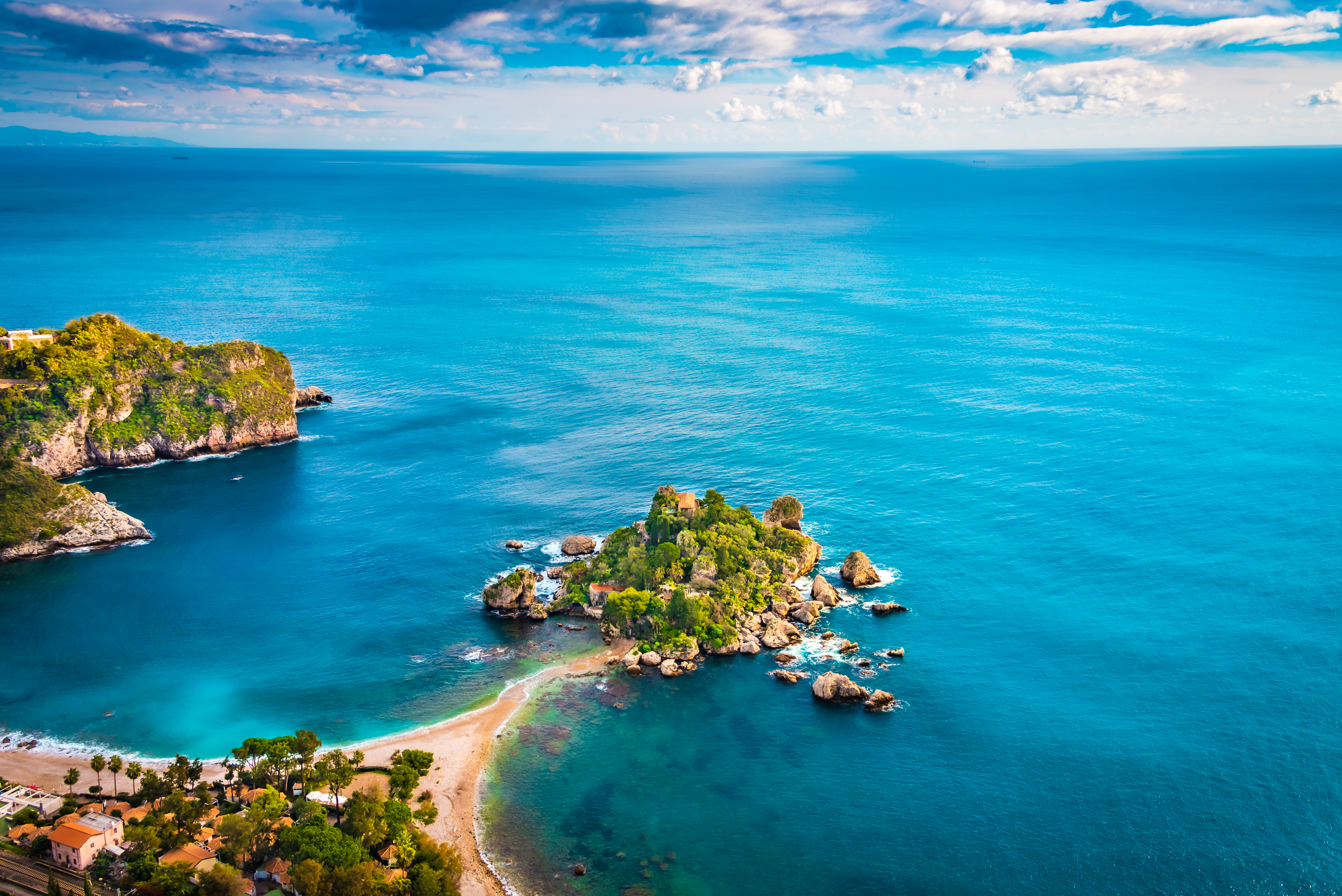
Isola Bella Taormina as seen from the beach

Isola Bella (Sicilian: Ìsula Bedda) is a small island near Taormina, Sicily, southern Italy. Also known as the Pearl of the Ionian Sea, it is located within a small bay on the Ionian Sea; it was a private property, for a time owned by Florence Trevelyan, until 1990, when it was bought by the Region of Sicily and turned into a nature reserve, initially administered by the Italian branch of the World Wide Fund for Nature. There is a narrow path that often connects the island to the mainland beach. The island is surrounded by sea grottos and has a small and rather rocky beach which is a popular destination for sunbathers.

== History ==
King Ferdinand I of the Two Sicilies gifted the island to the nearby town of Taormina in 1806. The island was in 1890 bought from the town by Trevelyan, who built a small house facing the sea and imported exotic plants, which thrived in the Mediterranean climate. Subsequent owners kept up the island, until the owner went bankrupt, and auctioned the island in 1990. The island had been noted by conservationists as early as 1983, and it was quickly obtained by the region and designated as a protected natural site. The island is home to several species of birds, and a few types of lizards.

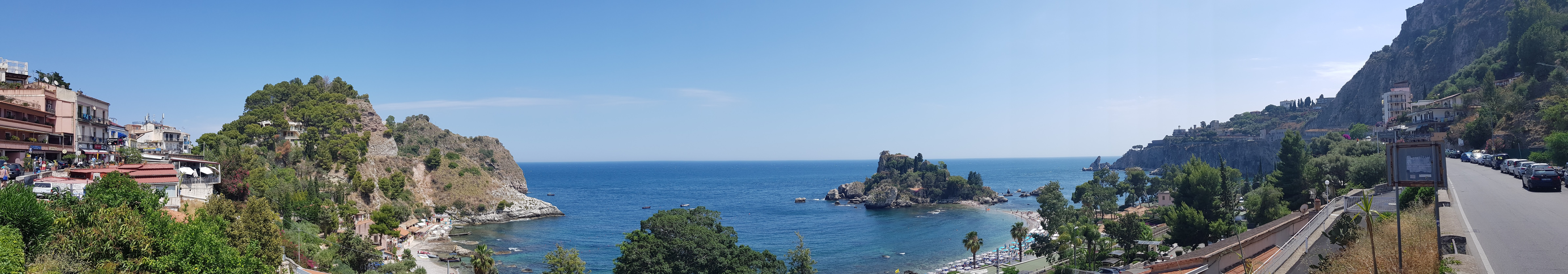
Panoramic view of Isola Bella, Taormina

== Nature reserve ==
By decree D.A. no. 619 of 4 November 1998, the Sicilian regional department for territory and environment designated the island together with the neighbouring promontories as the Riserva naturale orientata Isola Bella. The reserve covers 10.49 hectares: zone A consists of the island itself, zone B of the promontories of Capo Sant'Andrea and Capo Taormina. It is administered by CUTGANA, a research centre of the University of Catania.

The area was designated a Site of Community Importance in 2005 and, by ministerial decree of 21 December 2015, a Special Area of Conservation of the Mediterranean biogeographical region. The terrestrial site "Isola Bella, Capo Taormina, Capo S. Andrea" covers 21 hectares.

Endemic plants of the reserve include Limonium ionicum and Colymbada tauromenitana. Its fauna includes the lizard Podarcis siculus medemi, Audouin's gull (Larus audouinii) and the peregrine falcon (Falco peregrinus). The surrounding waters hold Posidonia oceanica meadows and the noble pen shell.

== See also ==
- History of Taormina
- Taormina
