= Taormina =

Taormina Taurmina (Sicilian)
- Comune
- Comune di Taormina
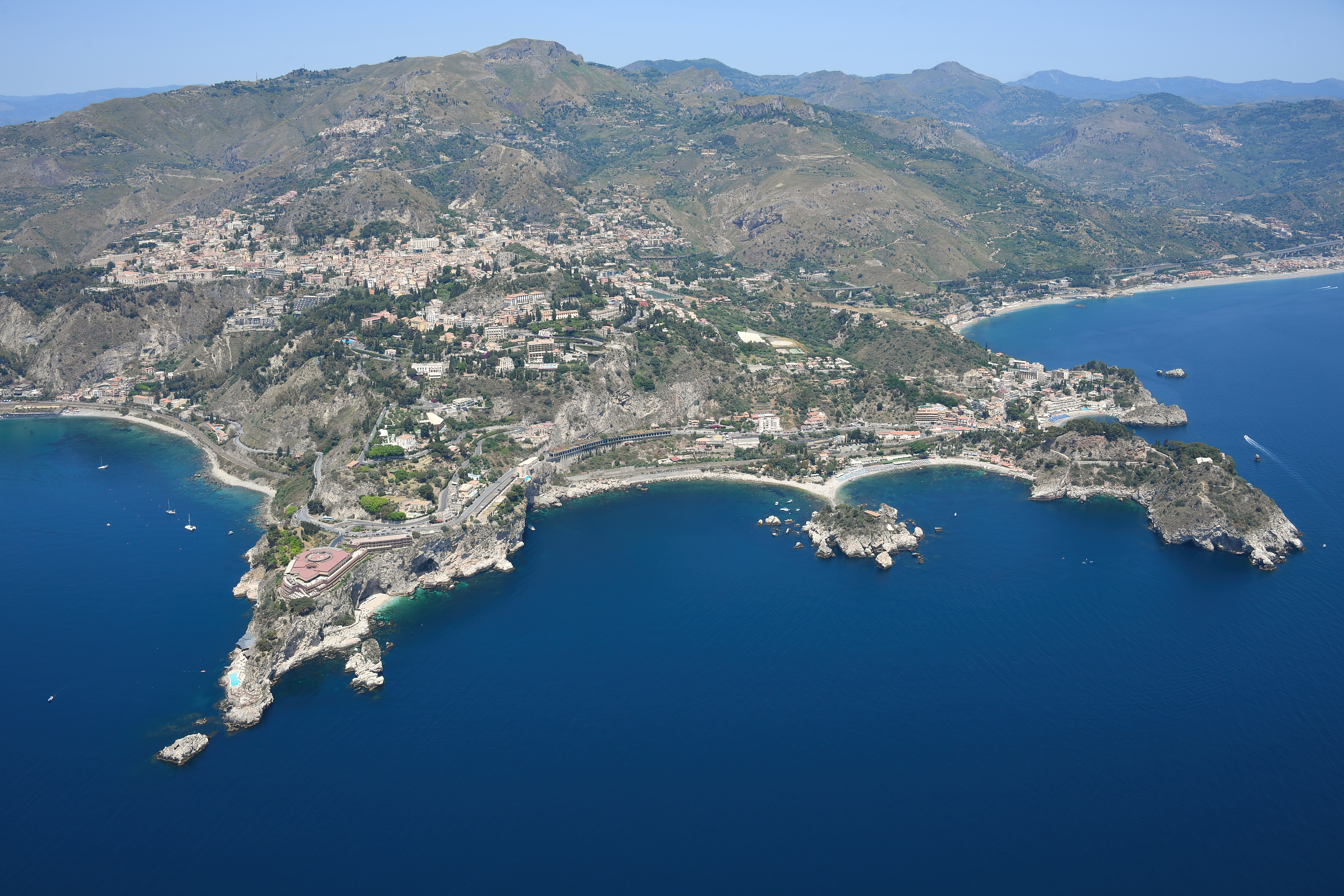
- Aerial view of Taormina

- Coat of arms
- Interactive map of Taormina
- Location within Italy Location within Sicily
- Coordinates: 37°51′8″N 15°17′31″E
- Country: Italy
- Region: Sicily
- Metropolitan city: Messina (ME)
- Frazioni: Mazzeo, Trappitello, Villagonia, Chianchitta, Spisone, Mazzarò

Government
  - Mayor: Cateno De Luca

Area
  - Total: 13.13 km^{2} (5.07 sq mi)
- Elevation: 204 m (669 ft)

Population (2025 May, 31)
  - Total: 10,440
  - Density: 795.1/km^{2} (2,059/sq mi)
- Demonym: Taorminesi
- Time zone: UTC+1 (CET)
  - Summer (DST): UTC+2 (CEST)
- Postal code: 98039
- Dialing code: 0942
- Patron saint: San Pancrazio di Taormina
- Saint day: 9 July
- Website: Official website (in Italian)

Taormina (Italian: [ta.orˈmiːna]; Sicilian: Taurmina) is a comune (municipality) in the Metropolitan City of Messina, on the east coast of the island of Sicily, Italy. Taormina has been a tourist destination since the 19th century. Its beaches on the Ionian Sea, including that of Isola Bella, are accessible via an aerial tramway built in 1992, and via highways from Messina in the north and Catania in the south.

== History ==
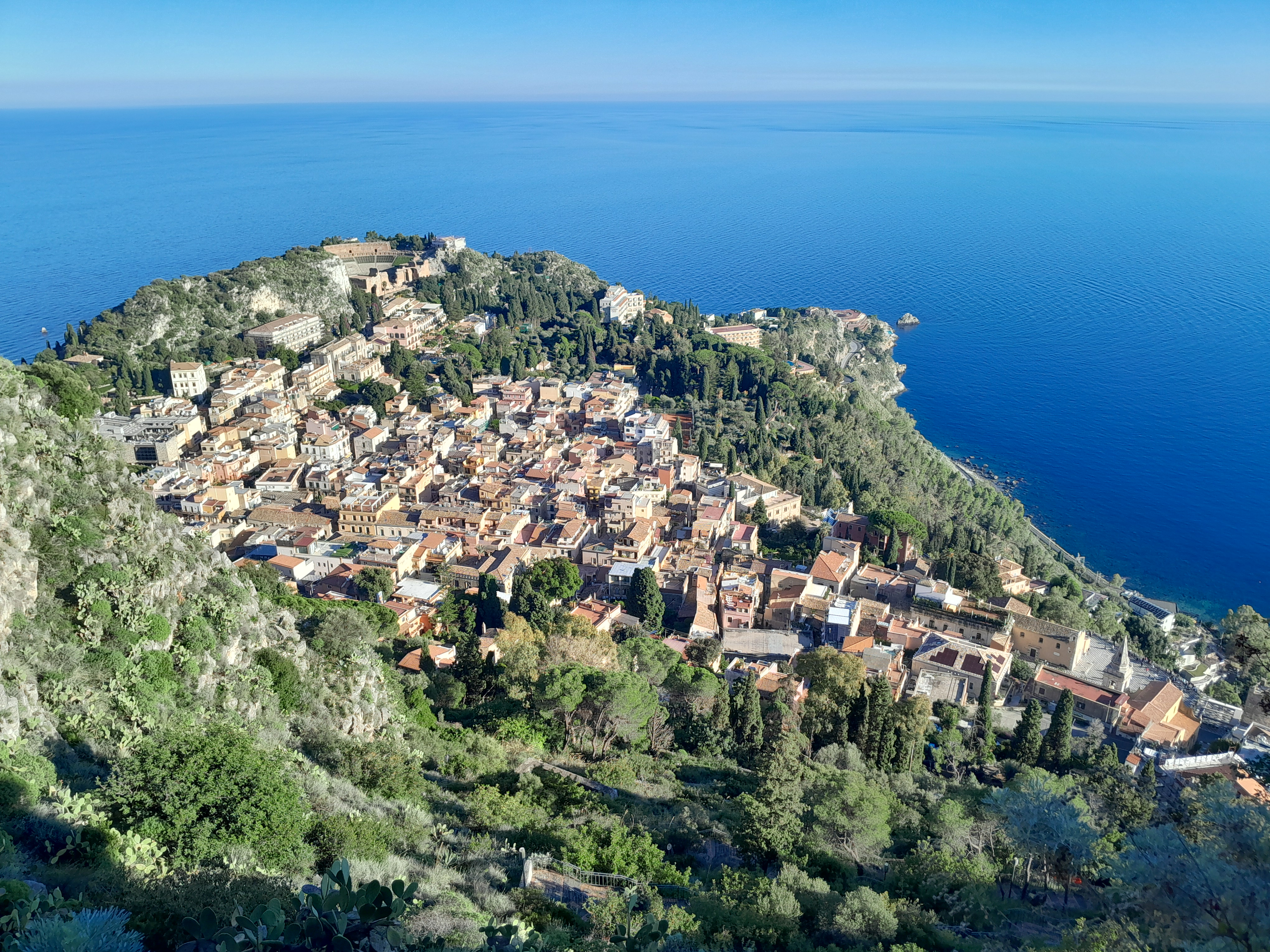
Taormina as seen from the Norman castle overlooking the town.

Taormina's history dates to before Ancient Greece established its first colony on Sicily in 734 BCE in Magna Graecia; the Greek name for the city was Tauroménion (Ταυρομένιον), later Latinized to Tauromenium. After the fall of the Western Roman Empire, Taormina remained one of the island's more important towns. Taormina followed the history of Sicily in being ruled by successive foreign monarchs. After Italian unification, Taormina began to attract well-off tourists from northern Europe, and it became known as a welcoming haven for gay men and artists. The municipality of fishermen, farmers, and wealthy bourgeoisie transformed into a town of merchants, hoteliers, and builders. During World War II, it was the headquarters of the German Wehrmacht command, and on July 9, 1943, the feast day of its patron saint, Bishop Pancras, Taormina suffered two devastating bombing raids by Allied aircraft, destroying part of its southern section and a wing of the San Domenico Hotel, where a meeting of the German High Command was taking place.

== Main sights ==
The present town of Taormina occupies the ancient site, on a hill that forms the last projecting point of the mountain ridge that extends along the coast from Cape Pelorus to this point. The site of the old town is about 250 metres (820 ft) above the sea, while a very steep and almost isolated rock, crowned by a Norman castle, rises about 150 metres (490 ft) higher. This is the likely site of the ancient Arx or citadel, an inaccessible position mentioned by ancient writers. Portions of the ancient walls may be traced at intervals all round the brow of the hill, the whole of the summit of which was occupied by the ancient city. Numerous fragments of ancient buildings are scattered over its surface, including extensive reservoirs of water, sepulchres, tessellated pavements, and the remains of a spacious edifice, commonly called a Naumachia, the real purpose of which is difficult to determine.

Saracen Castle: Built by the Arabs about 400 meters high on the rock of Monte Tauro, the Castello Saraceno dominated Taormina and its bay, and controlled the valley of the river Alcantara.

Arab Necropolis: The necropolis was probably built between the ninth and eleventh century with symmetrical cells positioned one on the other. Located outside the city walls that defended the town of Taormina, the necropolis extended northeastward between the existing ruins and the Church of St. Pietro.

The ancient theatre of Taormina is built for the most part of brick, and is therefore probably from Roman times, though its plan and arrangement are in accordance with those of Greek theatres; it is speculated that the present structure was rebuilt upon the foundations of an older theatre of the Greek period. With a diameter of 109 metres (358 ft) (after an expansion in the 2nd century), this theatre is the second largest of its kind in Sicily (after that of Syracuse); it is frequently used for operatic and theatrical performances and concerts. Most of the original seats have disappeared, but the wall that surrounded the whole cavea is preserved, and the proscenium with the back wall of the scena and its appendages, of which only traces remain in most ancient theatres, are preserved in an uncommon state of integrity. From the fragments of architectural decorations still extant it has been determined that these were of the Corinthian order, and richly ornamented. Some portions of a temple are also visible, converted into the church of San Pancrazio, but the edifice is small.

Other sights include the 12th-14th century Palazzo Corvaja, the 13th-century cathedral (Duomo di Taormina), a 1635 Baroque fountain, the Palazzo Duchi di Santo Stefano in 14th-century Gothic style, the Church of San Domenico, the Anglican Church of Saint George, and the municipal gardens (Giardini della Villa Comunale).

== Demographic evolution ==
Historical population

Year	Pop.	±%
1861	2,926	—
1871	3,023	+3.3%
1881	3,189	+5.5%
1901	4,110	+28.9%
1911	4,941	+20.2%
1921	5,181	+4.9%

Year	Pop.	±%
1931	5,829	+12.5%
1936	6,214	+6.6%
1951	6,690	+7.7%
1961	7,722	+15.4%
1971	9,106	+17.9%
1981	10,209	+12.1%

Year	Pop.	±%
1991	10,120	−0.9%
2001	10,780	+6.5%
2011	11,084	+2.8%
2021	10,473	−5.5%

Source: Data from ISTAT

=== Foreign ethnicities and minorities ===
As of 31 December 2023, foreign residents in the municipality were 714, i.e. 6.8% of the population. The largest groups were:

1. Bangladesh 118
2. Sri Lanka 90
3. Romania 82
4. Morocco 68
5. Ukraine 39
6. Russia 36

== Culture and tourism ==
Just south of Taormina is the Isola Bella, a nature reserve; and further south, beside a bay, is the popular seaside resort Giardini Naxos. Tours of the Capo Sant'Andrea grottos are available.

Taormina is on a cliff overlooking the Ionian Sea. Besides the ancient Greek theatre, it has many old churches, lively bars, fine restaurants and antique shops. The Santuario Madonna della Rocca is one such church. Located on the slope above the town, it commands an impressive view of the coast and Mount Etna to the south, and is accessible on foot via the staired path, Salita Castello. Taormina is approximately a 45-minute drive from Europe's largest active volcano, Mount Etna.

Taormina was visited by multiple famous celebrities, such as the Swedish actress Greta Garbo, German actress Marlene Dietrich and the English actress Elizabeth Taylor.

=== Image gallery ===
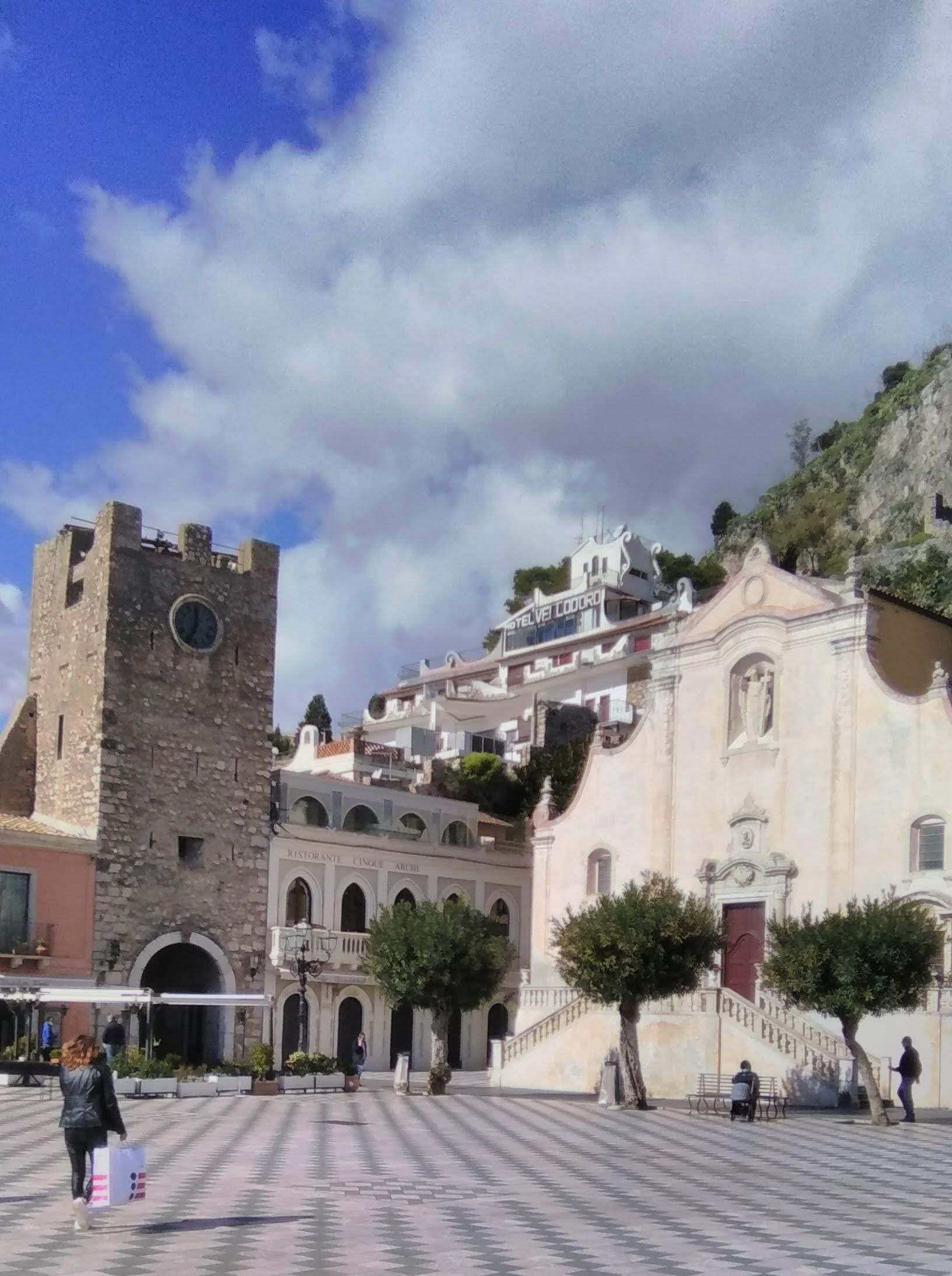
Piazza IX Aprile, Taormina's main square

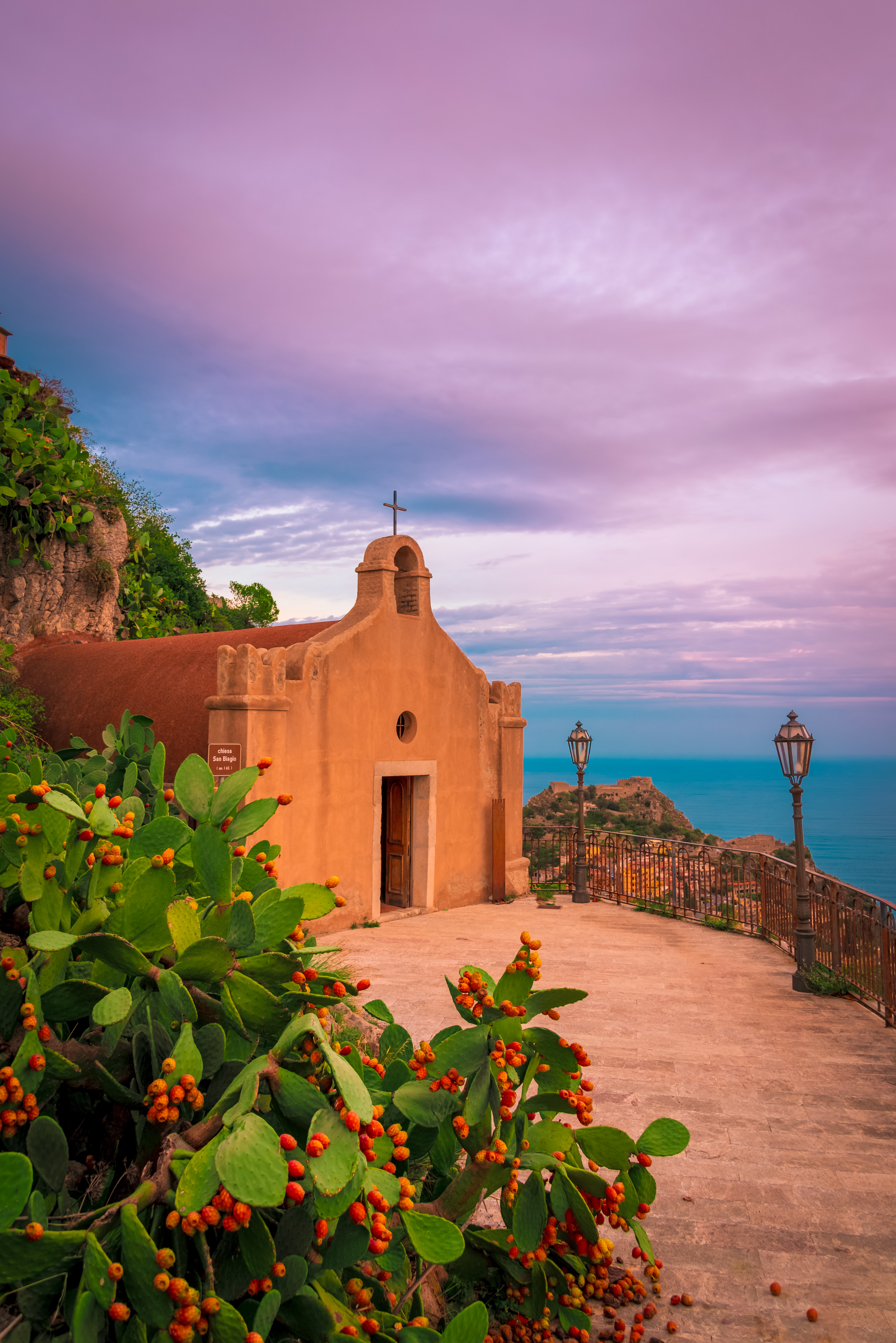
The first-century AD church of San Biagio

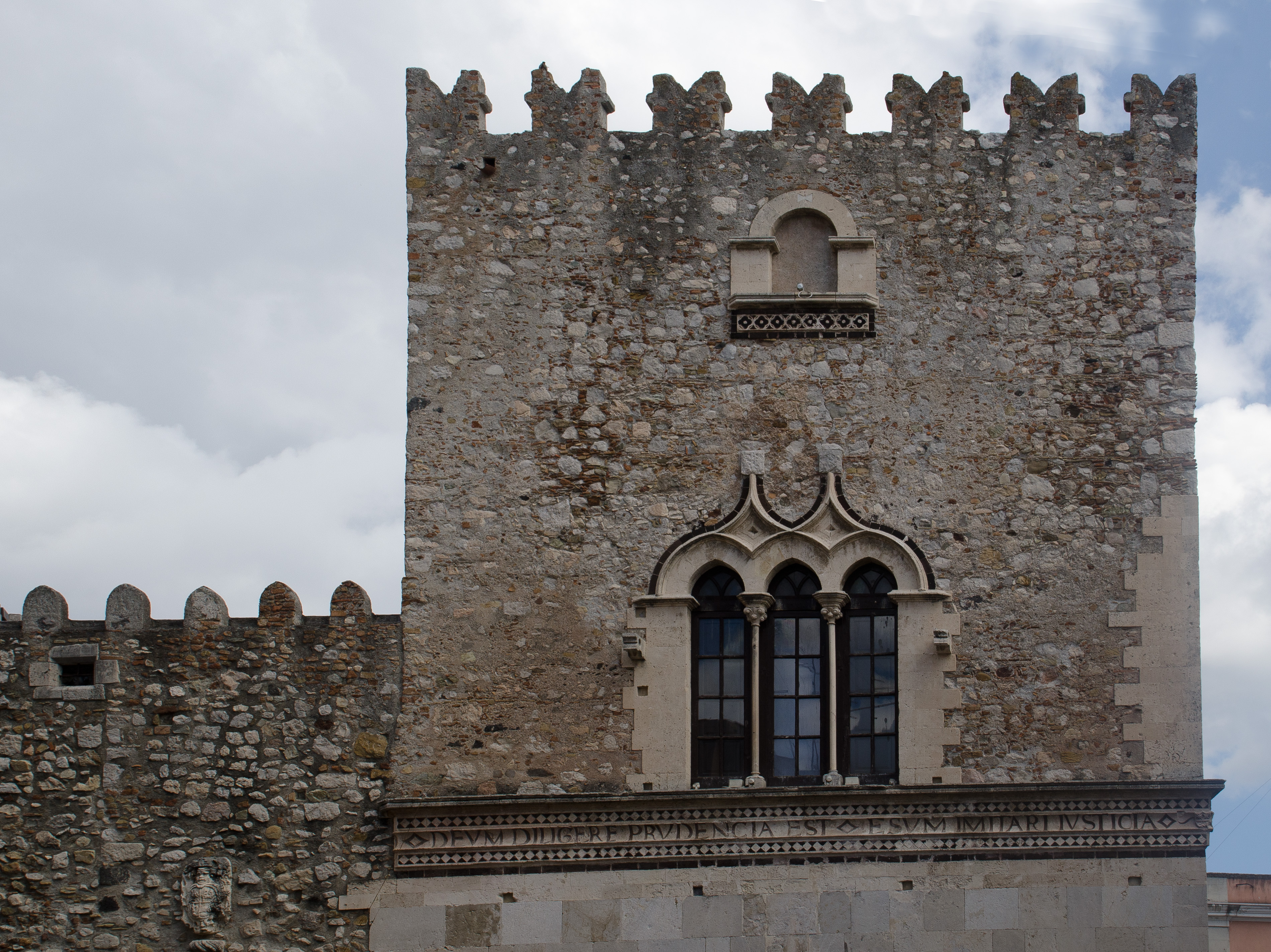
The tower of the 13th century Palazzo Corvaja showing the Gothic influence.

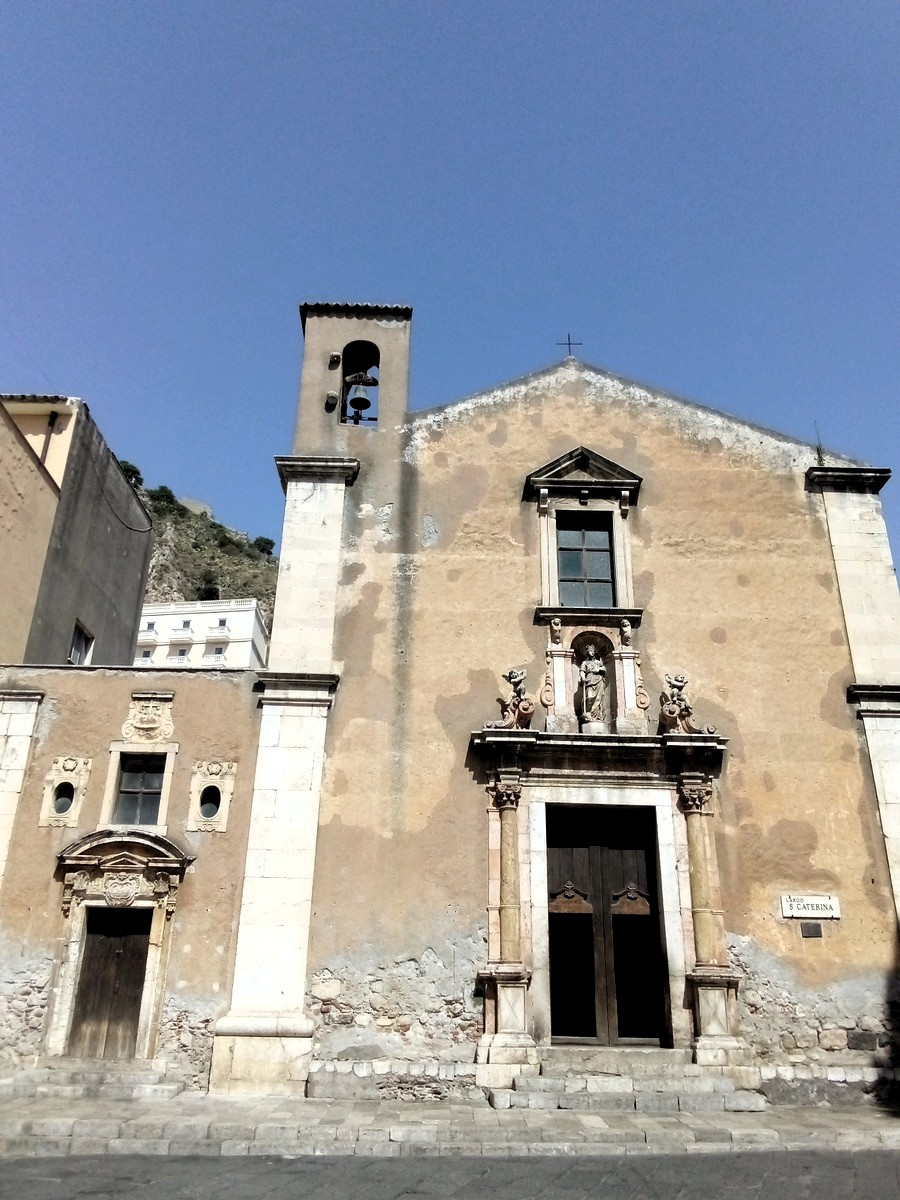
Church of Saint Catherine of Alexandria

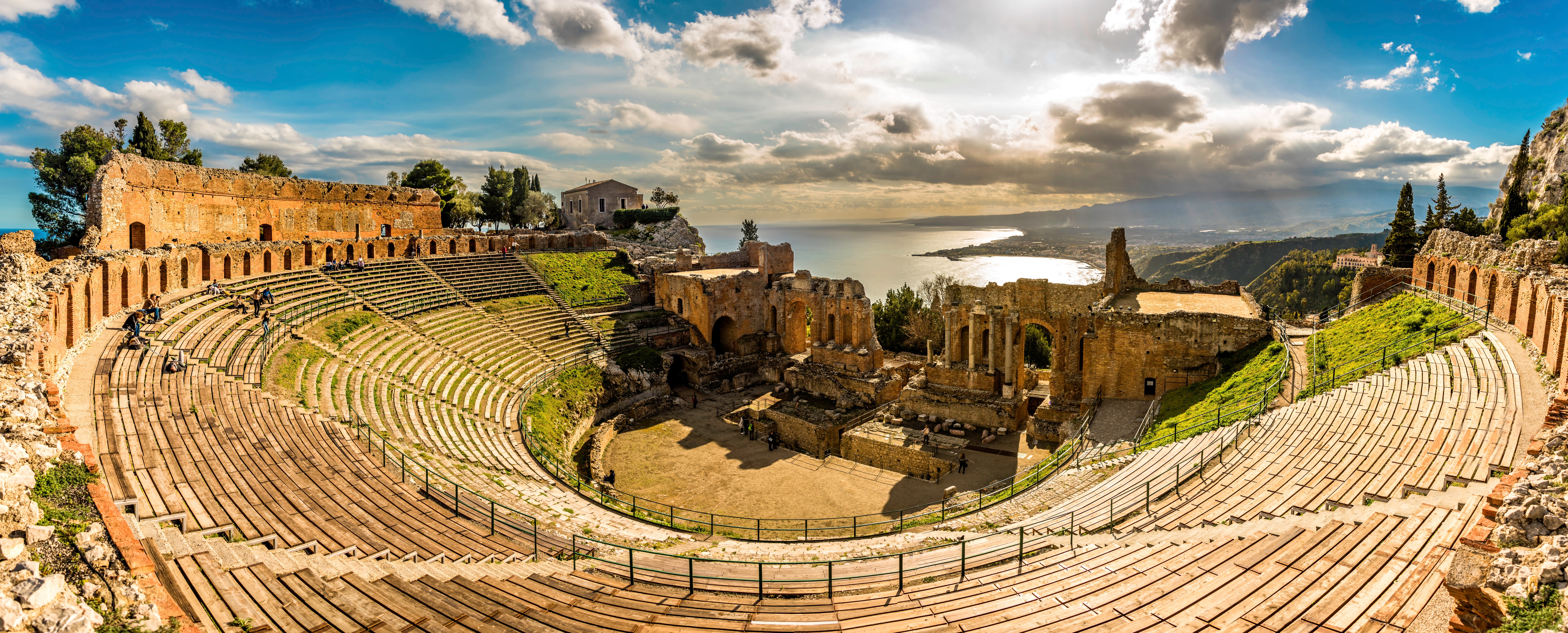
The Greek theatre of Taormina

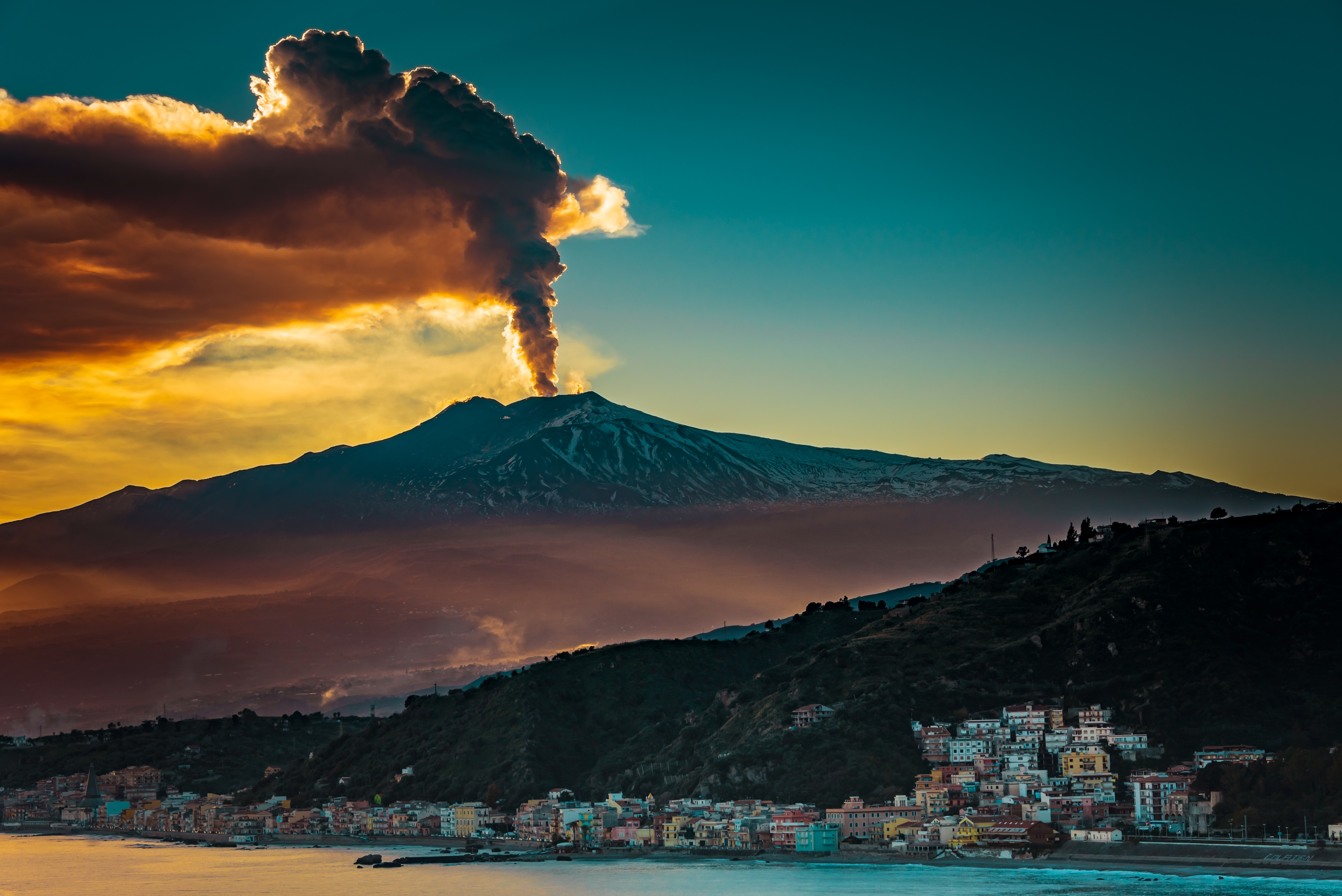
Mount Etna erupting

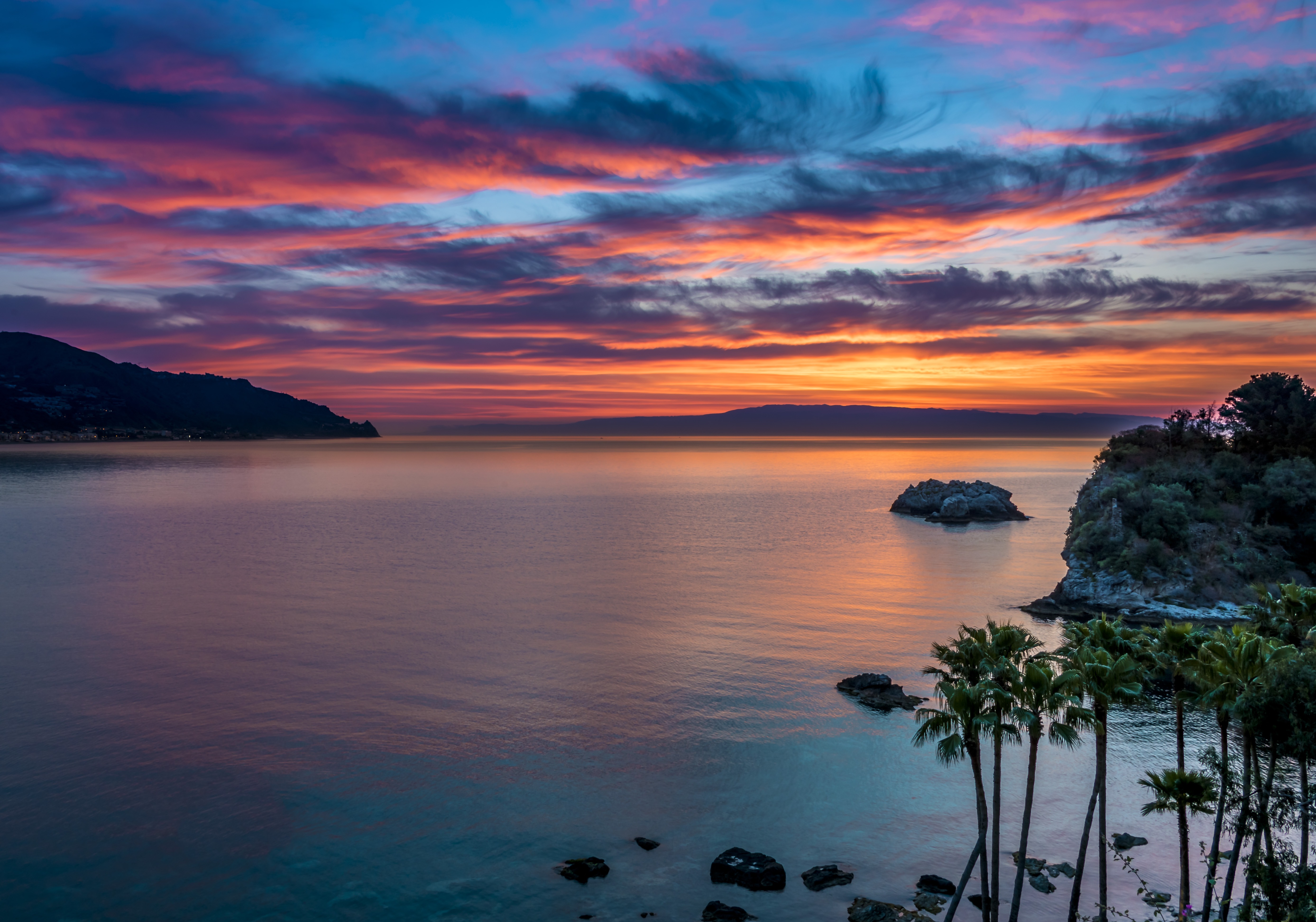
Coast looking Taormina

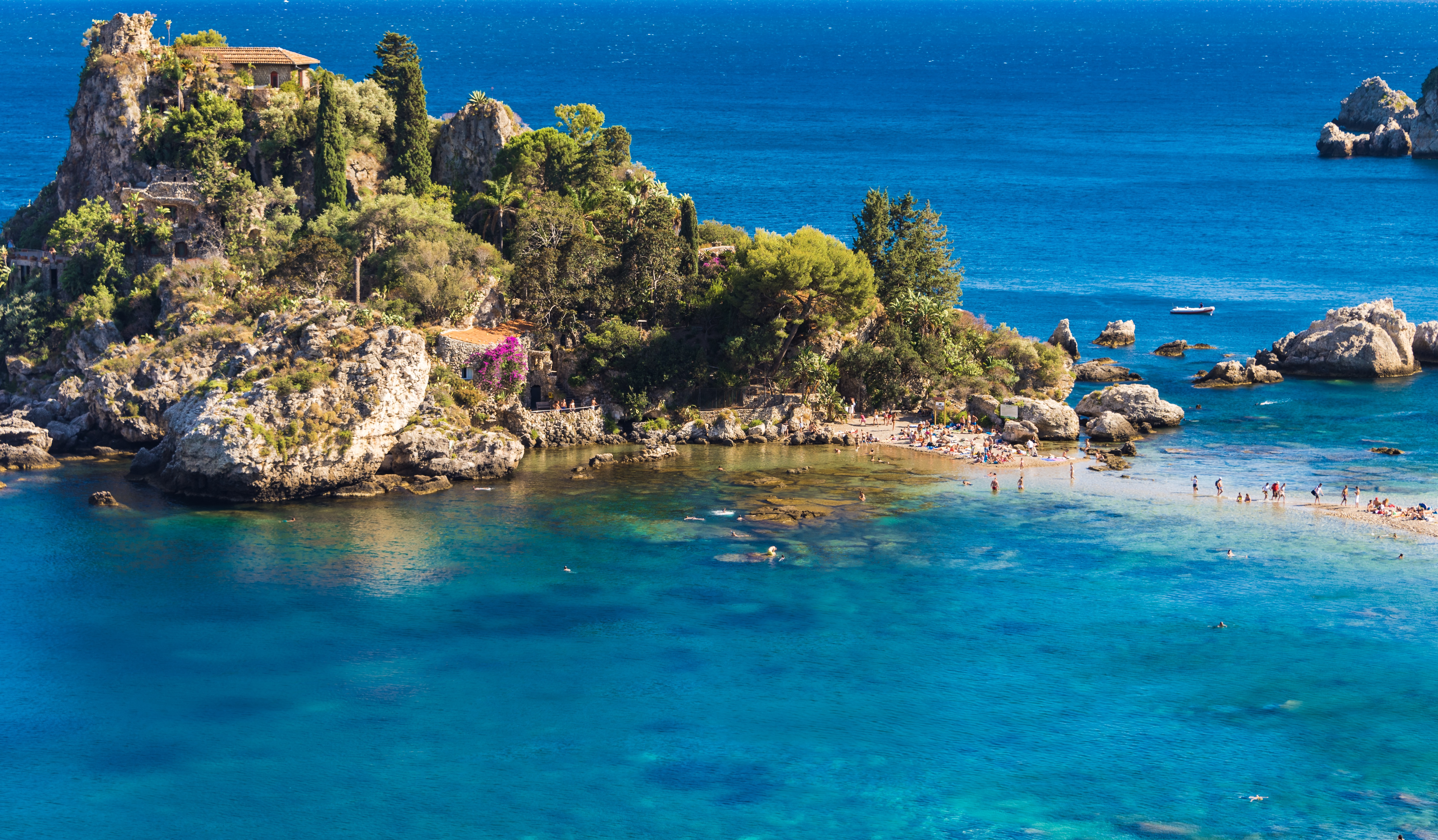
Isola Bella

The church of San Giuseppe on Piazza IX Aprile

Double Rainbow from the Saracen Castle, 2026

== Cultural references ==
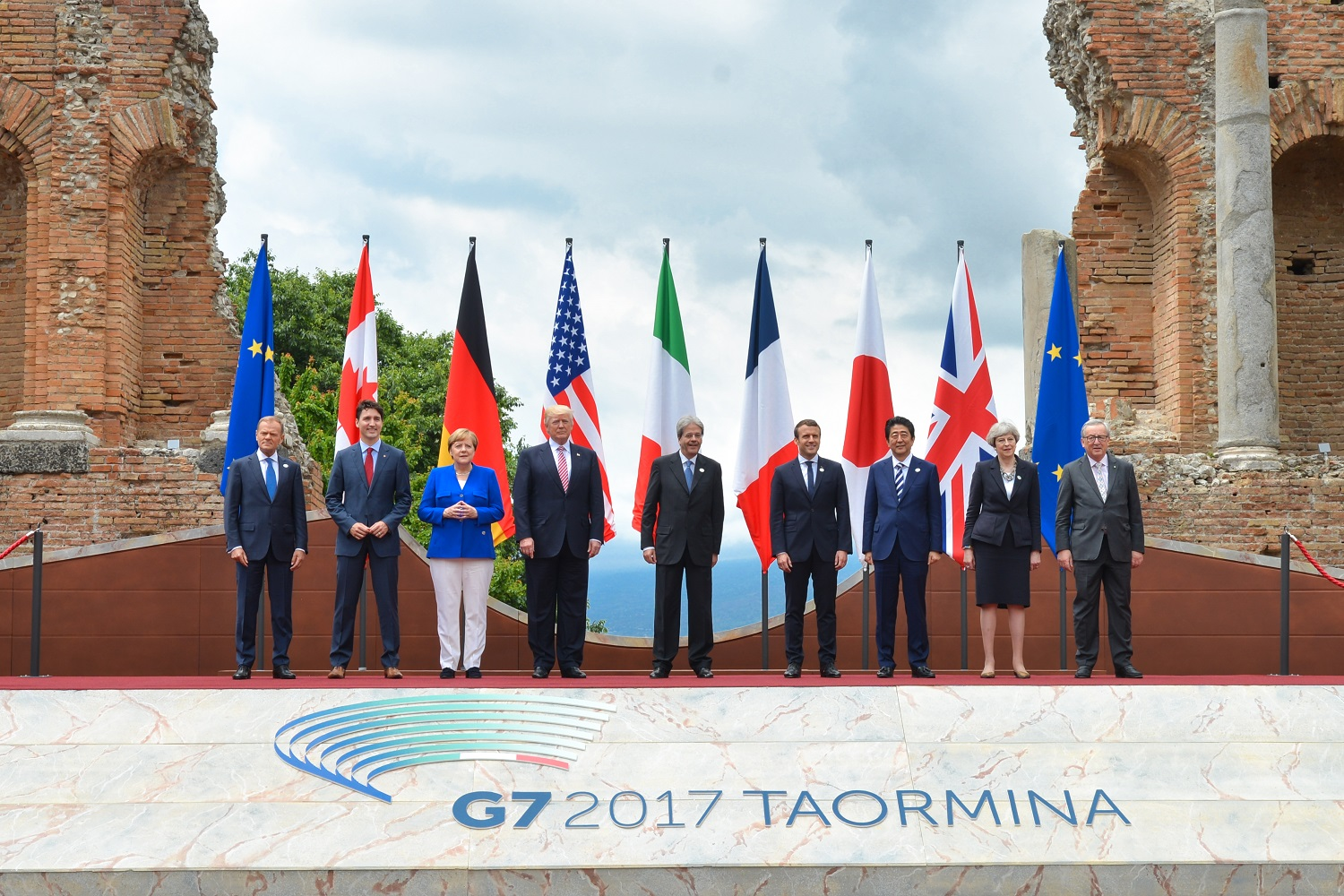
Group photo of G7 leaders at the Ancient Theatre

Taormina inspired the naming of 'Toormina', a suburb of Coffs Harbour, New South Wales, Australia.

A part of the film The Big Blue (1988) was set and filmed in Taormina, where the main characters take part in the no limits freediving World Championships.

The second season of the U.S. show The White Lotus primarily takes place in Taormina, and was filmed in various locations throughout the city.

Mark Knopfler's album Tracker (2015) has a song named "Lights of Taormina".

On 26–27 May 2017 Taormina hosted the 43rd G7 summit.

== Events ==
Many exhibitions and events are organized during the summer in Taormina. The exceptional stage for pop and classical concerts, opera and important performances often recorded by television (for example, the ceremony of the Silver Ribbon Award, the Festivalbar, the Kore) is the Ancient Theatre. Since 1983, the most important performances are realized by Taormina Arte, the cultural institution which organizes music, theatre and dance festivals.

Within the programme of Taormina Arte there is the Taormina Film Fest, the heir of the Cinema Festival of Messina and Taormina, dating from 1960, which for about twenty years has hosted the David of Donatello Awards. During the Taormina Film Fest the Silver Ribbons are awarded, a prize created by Italian Film Journalists.

Since 2005, in October, Taormina Arte has organized the Giuseppe Sinopoli Festival, a festival dedicated to its late artistic director.

== Notable people ==
- Timaeus of Taormineum, 3rd century BCE historian
- Andromachus, 4th century BC ruler of Tauromenium
- Tyndarion (278 BC), tyrant of Tauromenium
- Pancras of Taormina, sent to Sicily in 40 AD by Saint Peter as first Bishop of Tauromenium
- Thomas Shaw-Hellier (1836–1910), commissioned Villa San Giorgio
- Wilhelm von Gloeden (1856 in Wismar – 1931 in Taormina), German photographer who worked mainly in Italy, best known for his pastoral nude studies of Sicilian boys. Resident from 1880
- Pancrazio Buciunì (1879–1963), Gloeden's model, lover and heir
- Gayelord Hauser (1895–1984), Nutritionist and author
- Robert Hawthorn Kitson, (1873 in Leeds – 1947 in Casa Cuseni), British watercolour painter, resident from 1899
- Daphne Phelps (1911 – 2005), Kitson's niece and heir, a writer. Resident from c. 1947.
- Carla Cassola (born 1947), actress and composer.
- Francesco Buzzurro (born 1969), musician
- Cateno De Luca (born 1972), mayor (2023–)
- Guido Caprino (born 1974), actor
- Norma Murabito (born 1987), sprint canoeist

== International Relations ==
=== Twin towns and sister cities ===
- Abadan, Khuzestan, Iran
- Sunny Isles Beach, Florida, United States
- Contrexéville, France
- Swieqi, Malta

== See also ==
- List of Catholic dioceses in Italy
- European archaeology
