= Sawtell, New South Wales =

Suburb of New South Wales, Australia

Sawtell
- Suburb
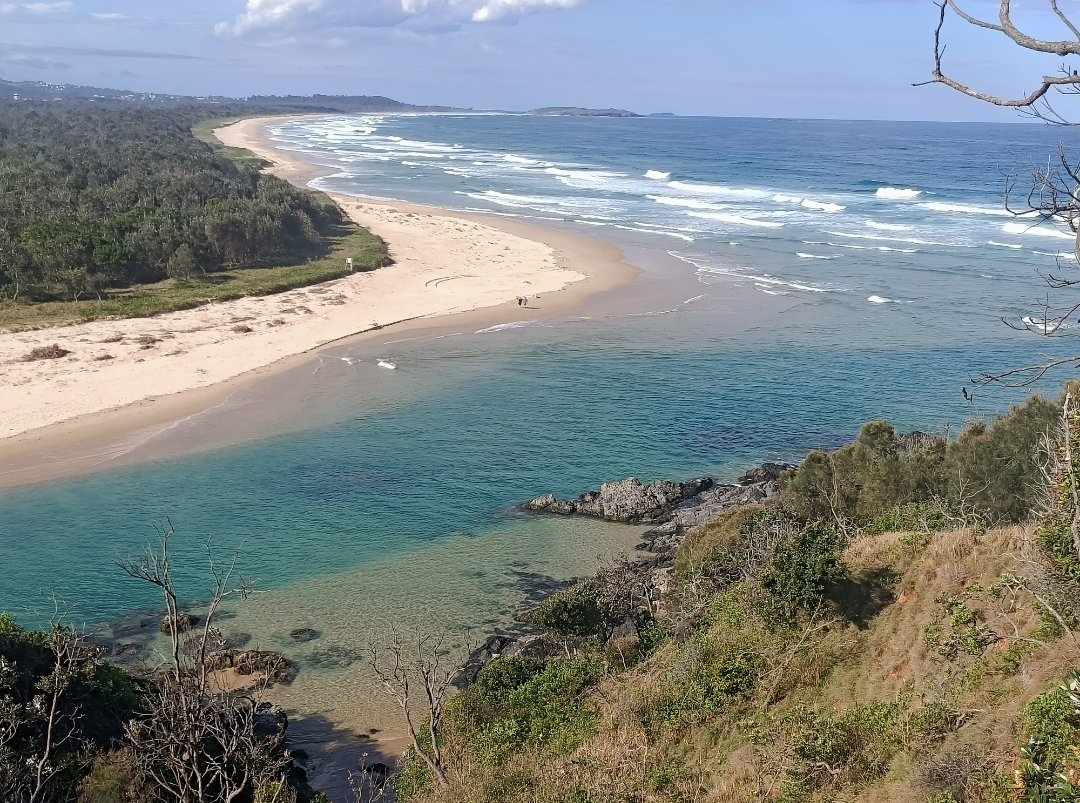
- View from a cliff in Sawtell, overlooking where Boambee Creek meets the Pacific Ocean

- Interactive map of Sawtell
- Coordinates: 30°23′S 153°06′E
- Country: Australia
- State: New South Wales
- City: Coffs Harbour
- LGA: City of Coffs Harbour
- Location: 528 km (328 mi) NNE of Sydney; 397 km (247 mi) S of Brisbane; 8 km (5.0 mi) S of Coffs Harbour; 30 km (19 mi) NE of Bellingen; 40 km (25 mi) N of Nambucca Heads

Government
  - State electorate: Coffs Harbour
  - Federal division: Cowper
- Elevation: 7 m (23 ft)

Population
  - Total: 3,788 (2021 census)
- Postcode: 2452

Sawtell is a suburb of the City of Coffs Harbour in northern New South Wales, Australia. It borders Toormina to the west.

== History ==
In 1863, a cutter carrying a load of cedar logs ran aground on what would become Sawtell Beach. A Coffs Harbour farmer named Walter Harvey assembled a team of workers to salvage the logs, and a small settlement developed near the site of the wreck.

Forty years later, the land around Sawtell Beach was purchased and subdivided by Oswald Sawtell for housing and farmland. Sawtell railway station, post office, school and hotel followed soon thereafter and by the 1930s Sawtell had become a thriving coastal village.

The original inhabitants of the land were Indigenous Australians of the Gumbaynggirr clan. The Aboriginal name for the land where the town now stands was Bongil Bongil.

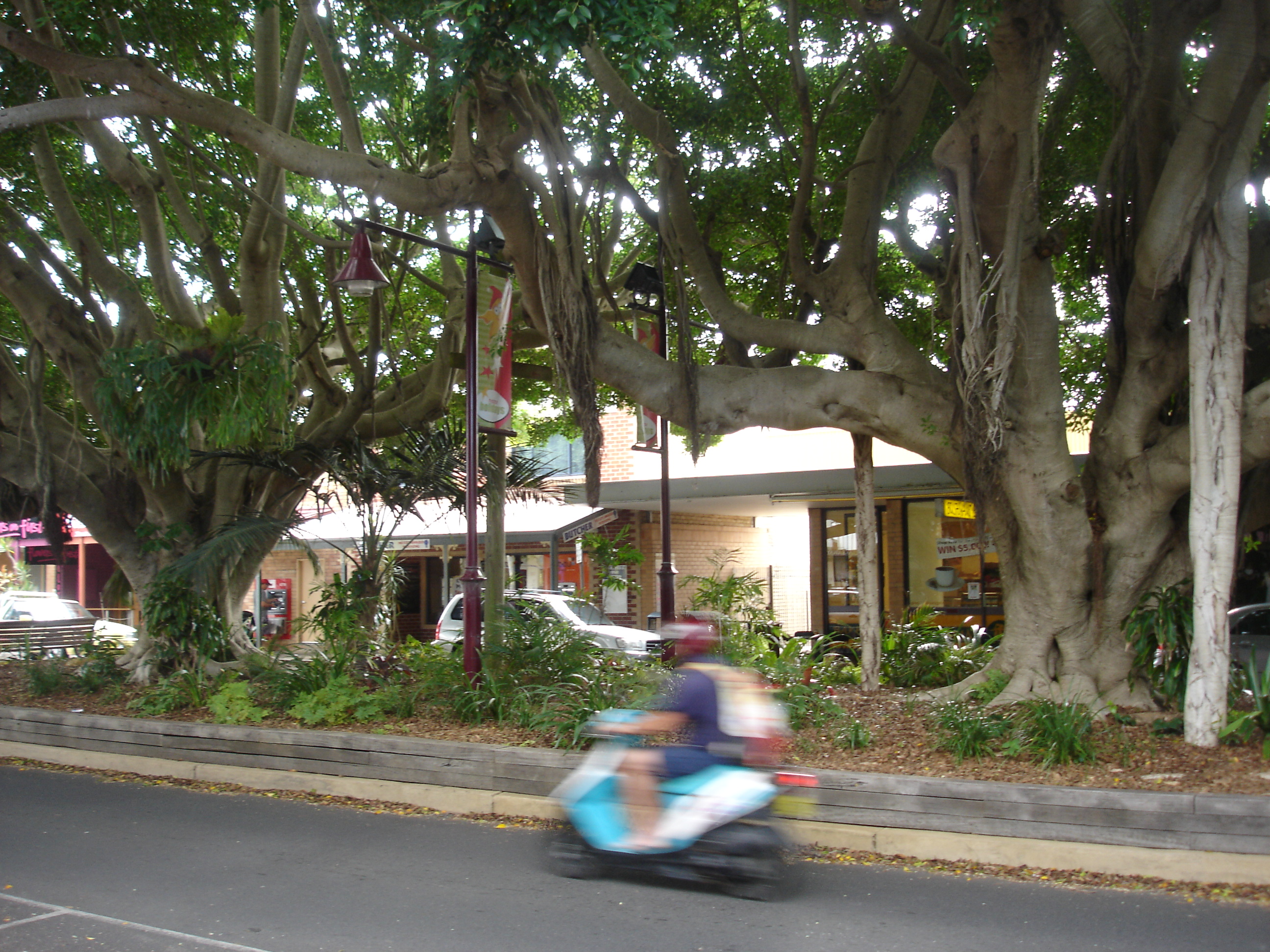
Sawtell's main street First Avenue with fig trees in the median

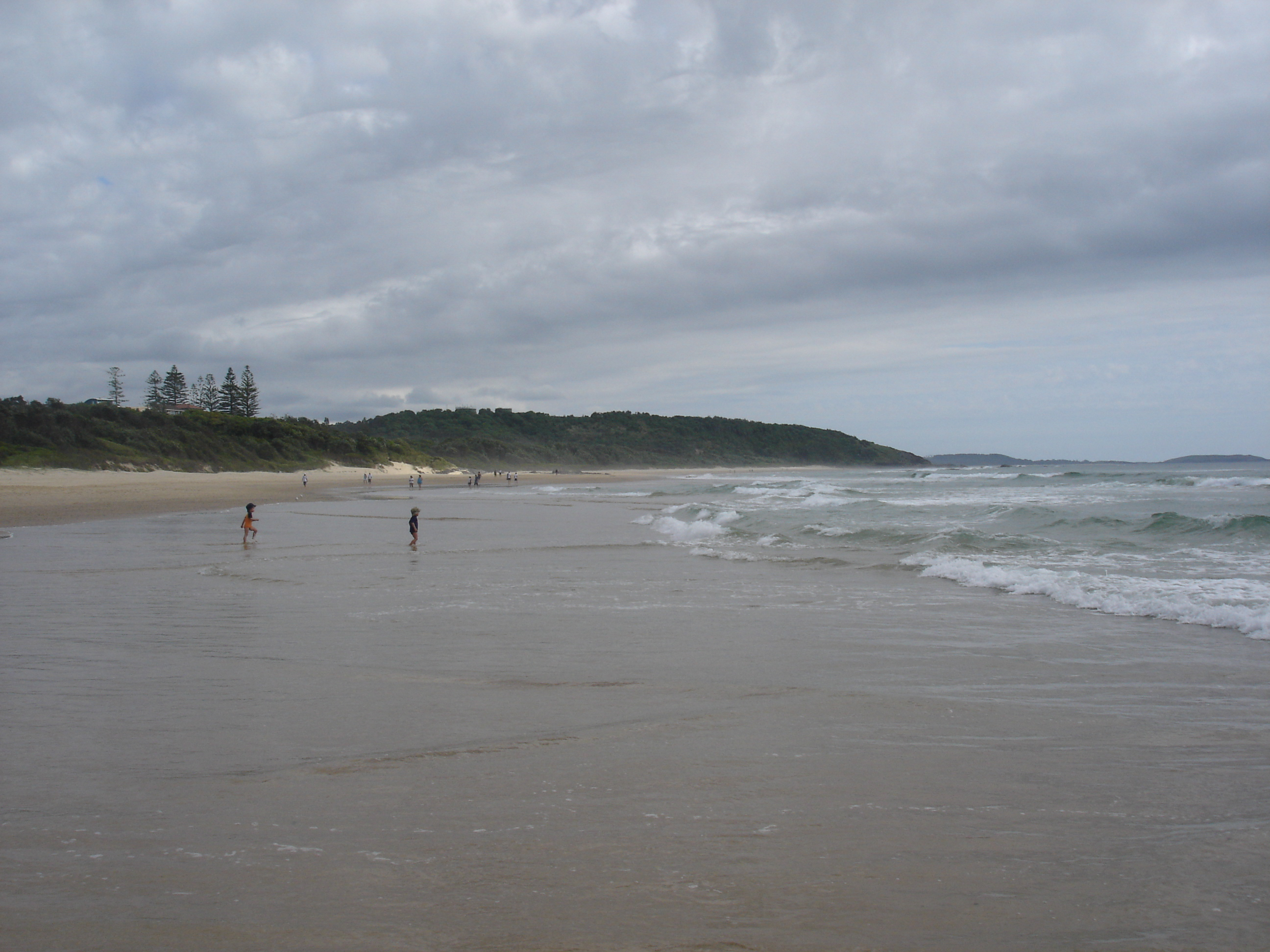
Sawtell's beach to the northern end

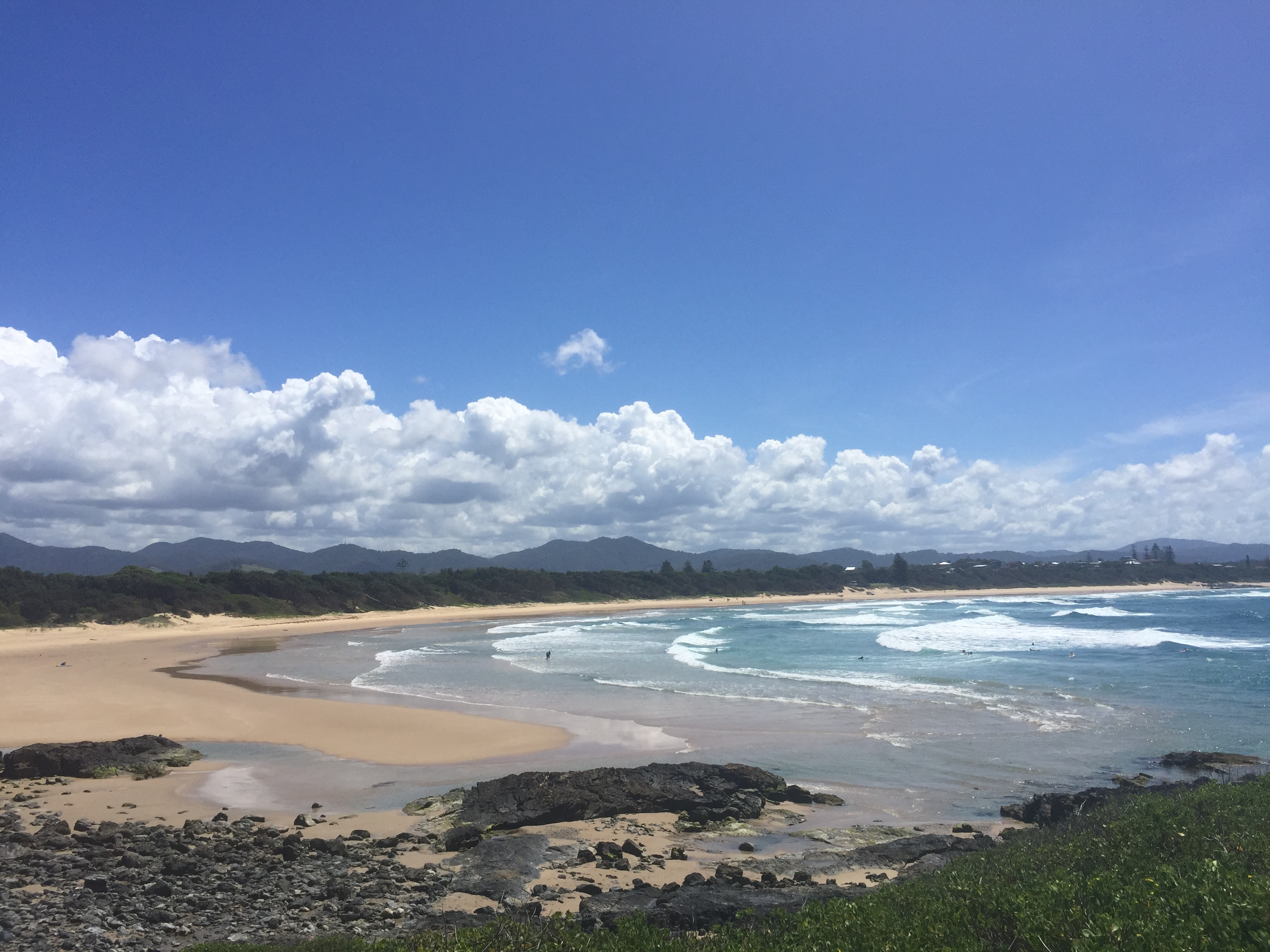
Sawtell Beach

== Location ==
A suburb of the City of Coffs Harbour, Sawtell is located on the north-eastern coast of New South Wales, adjacent to Toormina and Boambee, and 10 km south of Coffs Harbour. It is served by the North Coast railway line with six New South Wales XPT services daily, three heading north and three south. Sawtell station is an optional stop for all of them. Coffs Harbour Airport is located just to the north of Sawtell with the runway ending just to the north of the town.

== Demographics ==
At the 2021 Census, Sawtell had a population of 3,788. Aboriginal and/or Torres Strait Islanders made up 3.7% of the population.

Historical population
Year	Pop.	±%
1961	1,596	—
1966	1,558	−2.4%
1971	2,562	+64.4%
1976	3,711	+44.8%
1981	5,970	+60.9%
1986	7,905	+32.4%
1991	10,809	+36.7%
1996	13,240	+22.5%
2001	13,734	+3.7%
2006	15,009	+9.3%
2011	3,490	−76.7%
2016	3,682	+5.5%
2021	3,788	+2.9%
Source: Australian Bureau of Statistics data. Note: after 2006, Toormina and Boambee became counted separately in the Census and Sawtell's listed population shrunk considerably.

== Beaches ==
The Sawtell area contains several beaches. The main ocean beach is Sawtell beach, extending north from Sawtell Headland and the sheltered Sailors Bay swimming area to Murrays beach.

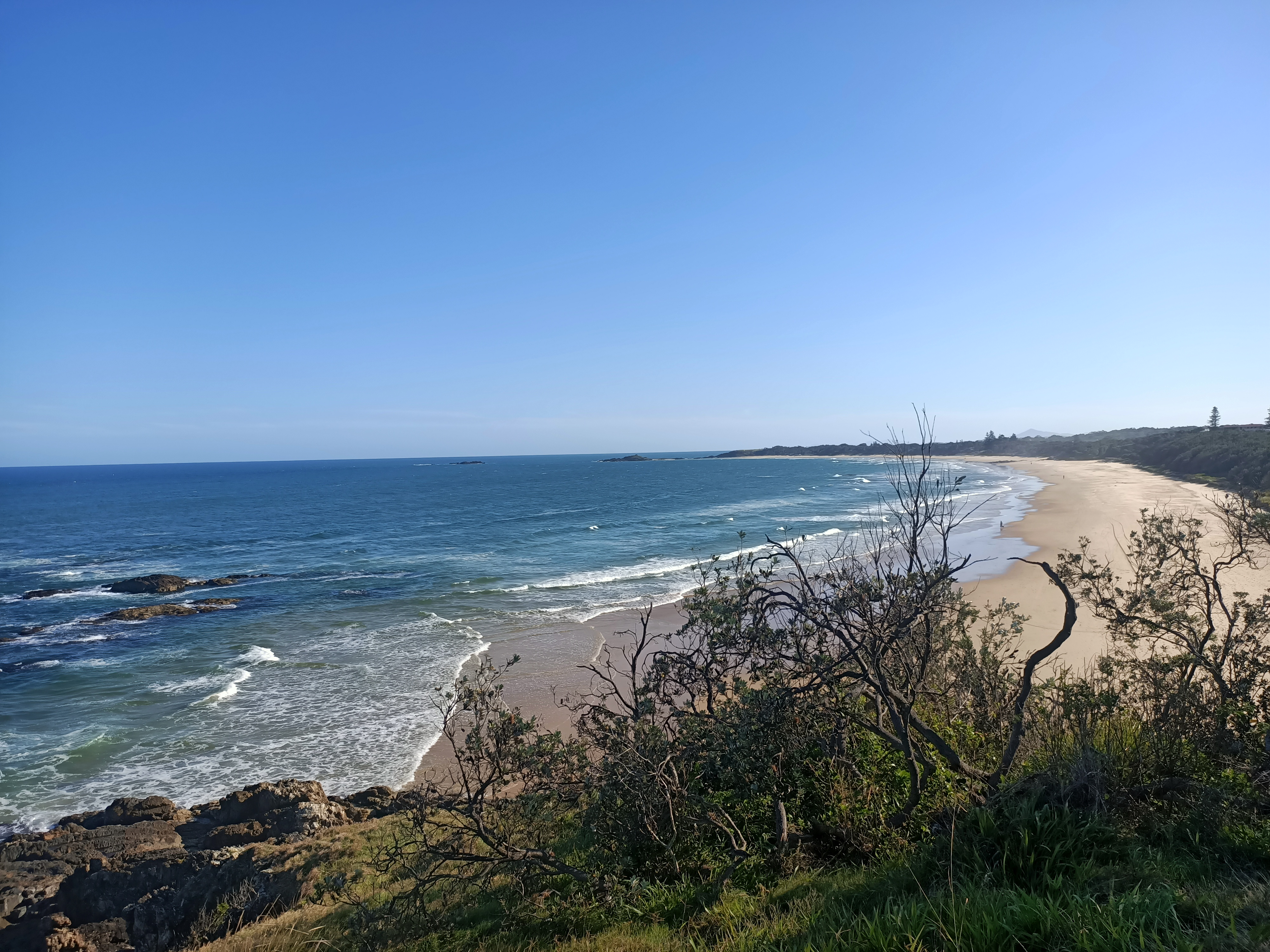
View from Boambee Head, looking south across Murrays Beach and Sawtell Beach

Murrays beach, also known as Sawtell Beach North, extends north from Sawtell beach to Boambee Head. Annually between September to April, Sawtell beach is patrolled by the local Surf Lifesavers who run Sawtell Surf Club half way along the beach. Due to the dunes, there are no true beach front properties on Sawtell Beach. Some properties look over Bonville Creek and some over Murray's Beach. The beach has singing sand when walked on in dry conditions.

== Sports and events ==
Sawtell has numerous sporting clubs and facilities. The Sawtell Panthers junior and senior Rugby League clubs play out of Rex Hardaker Oval, Toormina – along with Coffs Rugby, and the pigeon racing club. The Sawtell Scorpions are the local soccer club, based at Toormina Oval. The Sawtell Saints are the Australian Rules Football club, based at Richardson Park along with the Sawtell Cricket Club.

Sawtell also has a number of recreation sporting clubs, most notably, Sawtell Golf Club, Sawtell Bowling Club, Sawtell Swimming Club, Sawtell Surf Lifesaving Club and Sawtell Tennis Club.

A number of annual events have been organised by the local Sawtell Chamber of Commerce.

The annual Chilli Festival features over 100 stalls of local and national vendors serving chilli-based food and products. The Festival is one of Sawtell's major annual events and is family oriented.

The New Year's Super Fun Day involves family entertainment, including woodchopping, a fun run, tug of war competitions, and live entertainment on New Year's Day.

The Ben Woods Cricket Tournament, held between Sawtell and Coffs Harbour, takes place during the Christmas Period.

A surfing competition, held at Sawtell Beach, raises money for those living with spinal injuries. Surfers from all over NSW and Queensland come to compete in the event.

== Tourism and entertainment ==
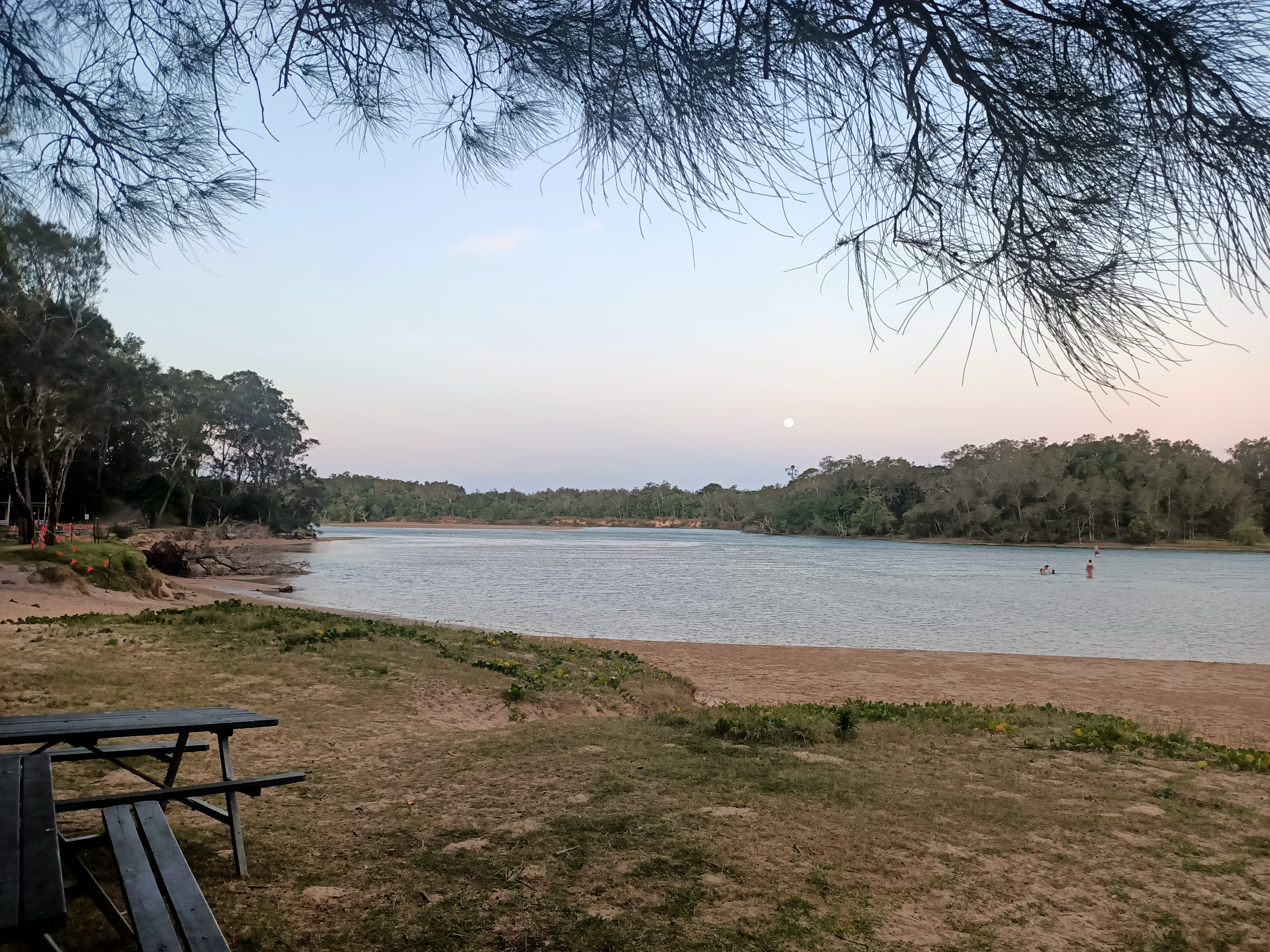
View of swimming area at Boambee creek

Sawtell has a modern cafe and restaurant scene. Boambee creek offers safe swimming and a walking path around the headland. Sawtell Headland is popular for whale watching. The Cinema has been recently renovated and offers two screens. The usual amenities, bakeries, post office, hotels, motels, laundromat are all available. Sawtell has excellent surf breaks to suit all levels and wind directions.
