= Toormina, New South Wales =

Toormina
- Suburb
- Interactive map of Toormina
- Coordinates: 30°21′S 153°05′E
- Country: Australia
- State: New South Wales
- City: Coffs Harbour
- LGA: City of Coffs Harbour
- Location: 527 km (327 mi) NE of Sydney; 11 km (6.8 mi) S of Coffs Harbour; 37 km (23 mi) NE of Bellingen

Government
  - State electorate: Coffs Harbour
  - Federal division: Cowper

Population
  - Total: 6,171 (2021 census)
- Postcode: 2452

Toormina is a suburb in the City of Coffs Harbour, on the east coast of New South Wales, Australia. Located in the city's south, Toormina is near the seaside suburb of Sawtell.

== History ==
The suburb was developed in the 1980s by Mr Patrick Hargraves, a local landowner who owned a large amount of land within the Coffs Harbour and Sawtell area. Hargraves holidayed in Sawtell with his family annually for Christmas during the 1960s and says that he ″saw the opportunity for expansion in new subdivisions to the west of the existing centre and slowly bought the land that now is Toormina″.

The suburb’s name ′Toormina′ was inspired by local residents. Some of Hargraves′ clients, who were Italian residents living in the area, suggested the name Taormina based on the famous resort area in Sicily, Italy. Hargraves decided that the name sounded better without the ′a′ and changed the name to Toormina.

The suburb is connected to Coffs Harbour by Hogbin Drive, commonly referred to as the Link Road, and is serviced by Sawtell Coaches and Busways. During the subdivision of the land along Hogbin Drive, which was involved in the development of Toormina, Hargraves agreed to a land swap with the Coffs Harbour and District RSL for the Coffs Harbour Education Campus and also donated land for the Coffs Harbour Catholic High School, St. John Paul College.

== Schools ==
The area's education is covered by Toormina High School, Toormina Primary School and (Bayldon) Primary School, and a number of independent schools including the Catholic Primary School Mary Help of Christians.

== Toormina Gardens ==
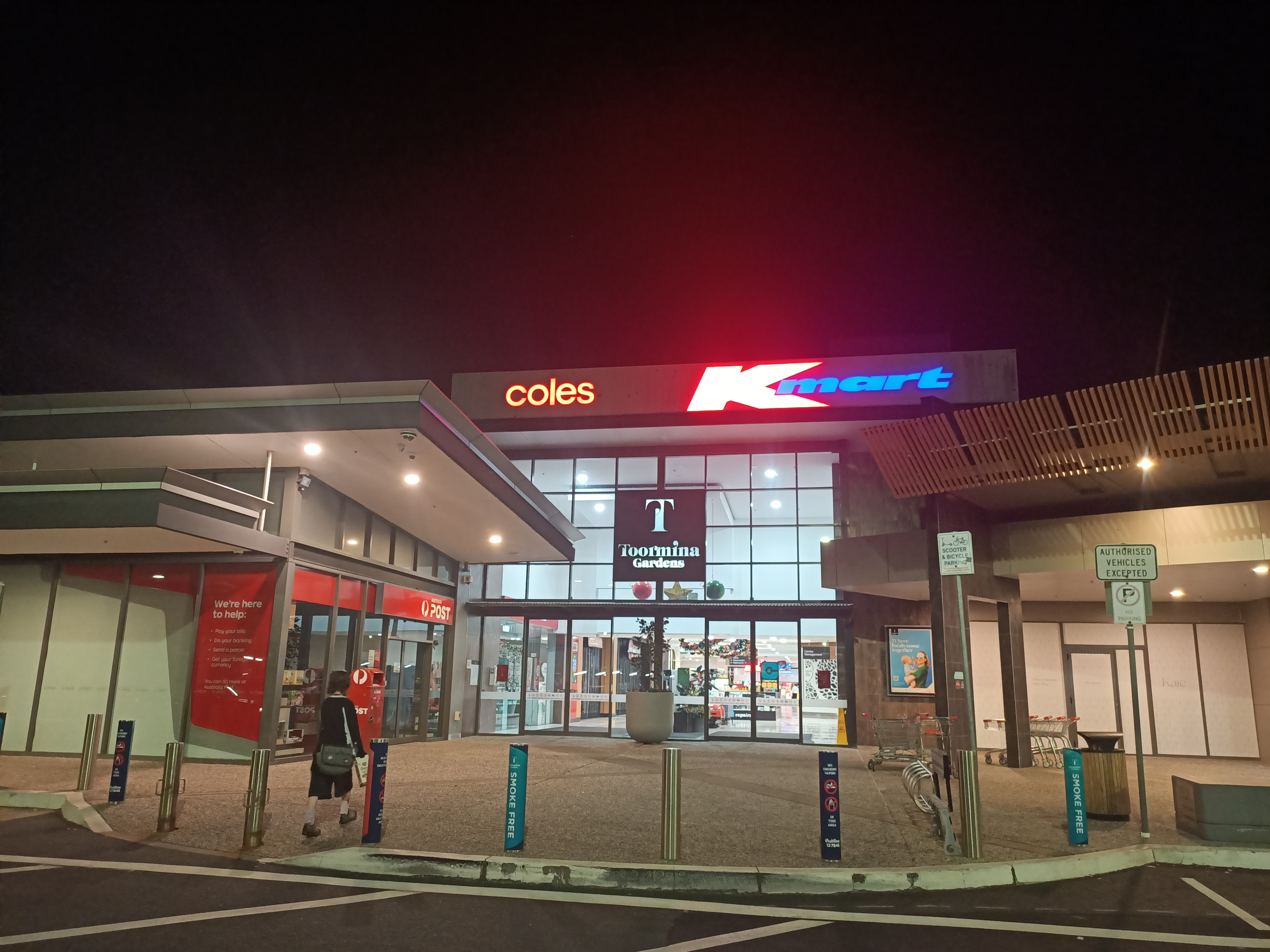
Toormina Gardens signage showing AusPost, Kmart and Coles

A local shopping centre, Toormina Gardens, was built in the 1980s to service the growing population in south Coffs Harbour. Situated off Toormina road, the centre was bought in 2001 by Centro Properties Group and renamed Centro Toormina. In April 2007 the Coffs Harbour City Council approved a A$20 million redevelopment of the centre that would incorporate a Kmart Australia discount department store, in with the existing supermarkets run by Coles and Woolworths, and specialty stores including Man to Man Menswear, Michael Hill Jewellers, & Sanity Music. Major work on the redevelopment, which included the suburb's first set of traffic lights, was completed by November 2008 by Mainbrace Constructions, with the grand re-opening for Centro Toormina on the 27th. Centro was sold in 2013 and renamed back to its original name Toormina Gardens. Supermarket chain Aldi built its stand alone shopping complex next to Toormina Gardens and began its operations in late 2013.

== Other ==
Clint Greenshields, a former player for St George Illawarra Dragons, in the NRL, came from Toormina. He previously played in France for the Catalans Dragons from 2007 until 2012 where he switched to the NRL for the QLD Cowboys. Other town facilities include a velodrome, skate park and a well maintained BMX track that regularly hosts state championships.
