= Giuseppe Bruno =

Giuseppe Bruno can refer to:

- Giuseppe Bruno (mathematician) (1828–1893), Italian mathematician and professor of geometry
- Giuseppe Bruno (cardinal) (1875–1954), Italian cardinal of the Catholic Church
- Giuseppe Bruno (photographer) (1836–1904), Italian photographer
