= History of Taormina =

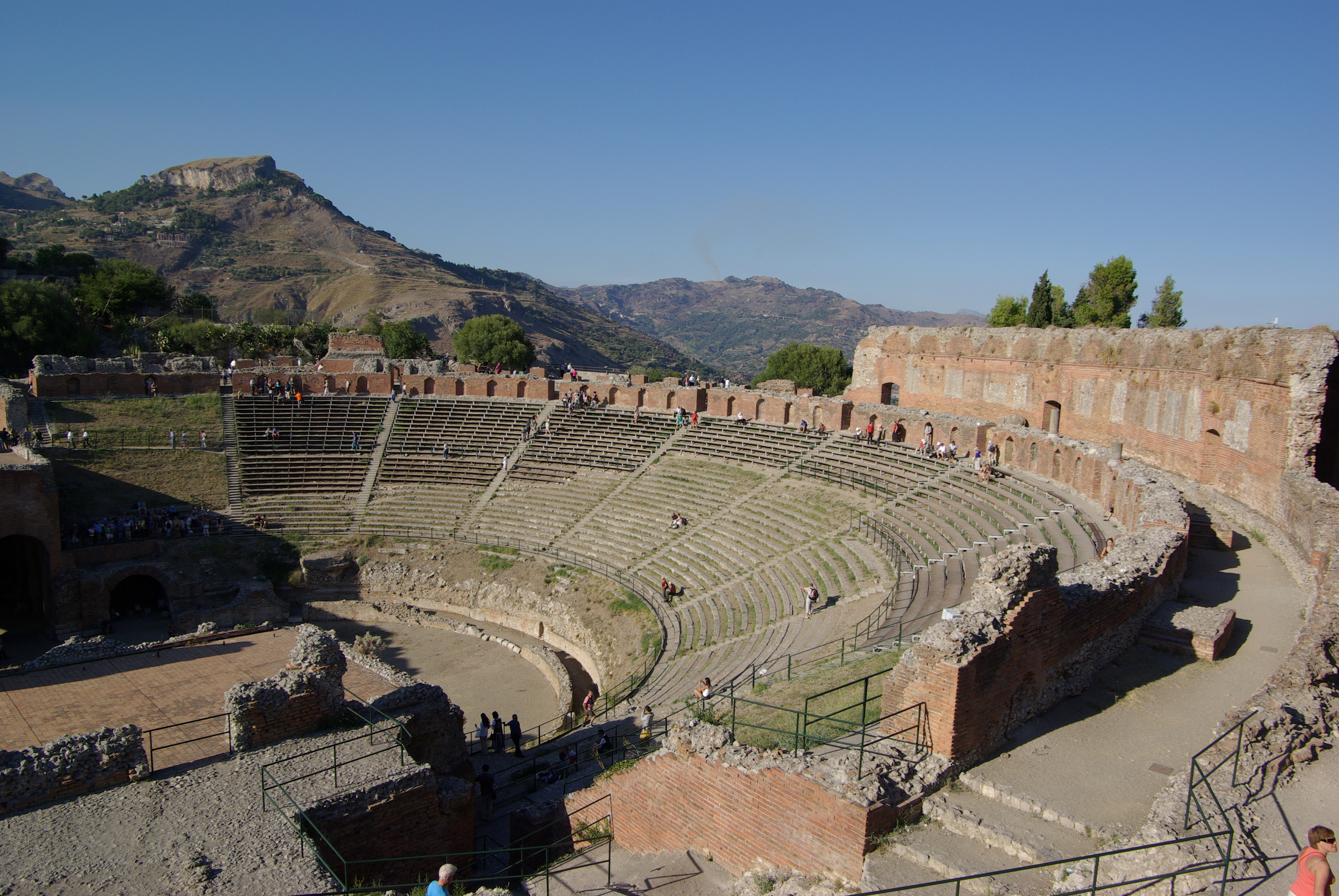
Taormina Theatre

Taormina dates to around 396 BC after Dionysius I of Syracuse destroyed nearby Naxos in 403 BC and the Siculi formed a new settlement on the nearby Mount Taurus which gradually grew up into the city of Tauromenium (Ancient Greek: Ταυρομένιον) (modern Taormina).

After the fall of the Western Roman Empire, Taormina continued to rank as one of the more important towns of the island, following the history of Sicily in being ruled by successive foreign monarchs. After the Italian unification, Taormina began to attract well-off tourists from northern Europe.

== Ancient Tauromenion ==
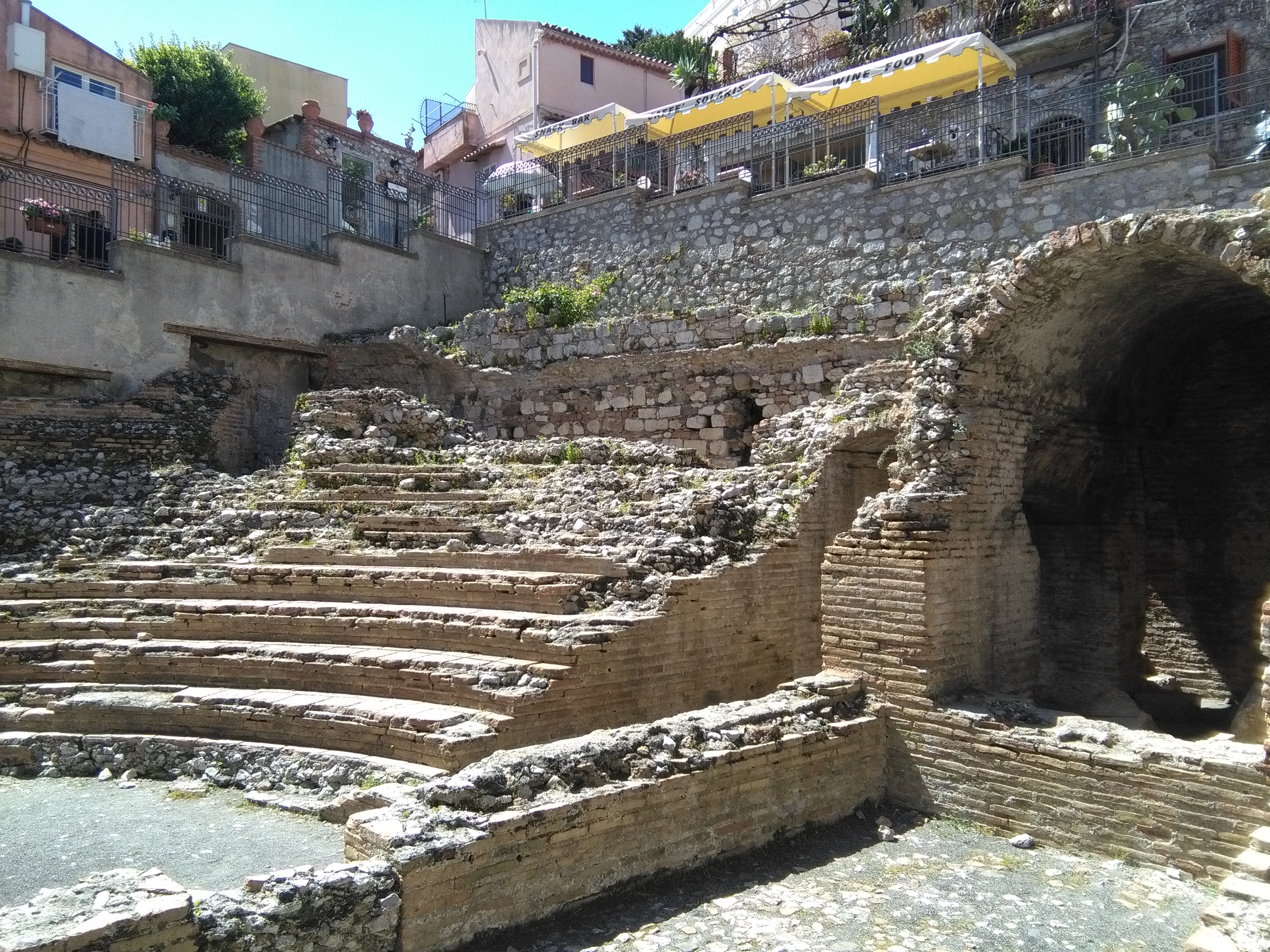
Roman Odeon constructed by the Romans in 21 BC for small performances frequented by the local Roman elite

The area around Taormina was inhabited by the Sicels even before the Greeks arrived on the Sicilian coast in 734 BC to found Naxos in Magna Graecia. After the destruction of nearby Naxos in 403 BC and the foundation of a new settlement on Mount Taurus, in 358 BC Andromachus collected the Naxian exiles together again from all parts of the island and established them at Tauromenium which became the successor of the ancient Naxos.

The new settlement seems to have risen rapidly to prosperity, and was apparently already a considerable town at the time of Timoleon's expedition in 345 BC. It was the first place in Sicily where that leader landed, having eluded the vigilance of the Carthaginians, who were guarding the Straits of Messina, and crossed direct from Rhegium (modern Reggio di Calabria) to Tauromenium. The city was at that time still under the government of Andromachus, whose mild and equitable administration is said to have presented a strong contrast with that of the despots and tyrants of the other Sicilian cities. He welcomed Timoleon with open arms, and afforded him a secure resting place until he was enabled to carry out his plans in other parts of Sicily. Andromachus was not deprived of his position of power when all the other tyrants were expelled by Timoleon, but was permitted to retain it undisturbed till his death.

Little is recorded about Tauromenium for some time after this. It is probable that it passed under the authority of Agathocles, who drove the historian Timaeus into exile; and some time after this it was subject to a domestic despot of the name of Tyndarion, who was contemporary with Hicetas of Syracuse and Phintias of Agrigentum. Tyndarion was one of those who concurred in inviting Pyrrhus into Sicily (278 BC), and when that monarch landed with his army at Tauromenium, joined him with all his forces, and supported him in his march upon Syracuse. A few years later, we find that Tauromenium had fallen into the power of Hieron II of Syracuse, and was employed by him as a stronghold in the war against the Mamertines. (Id. p. 497.) It was also one of the cities which was left under his dominion by the treaty concluded with him by the Romans in 263 BC.

Tauromenium continued to form a part of the kingdom of Syracuse until the death of Hieron, and that it only passed under the government of Rome when the whole island of Sicily was reduced to a Roman province.

During the Second Punic War it would appear from a hint in Appian that it submitted to Marcellus on favourable terms and it is probable that it then obtained the peculiarly favoured position it enjoyed under the Roman dominion. Tauromenium was one of the three cities in Sicily which enjoyed the privileges of a civitas foederata or allied city, thus retaining a nominal independence, and was not even subject, like Messina, to the obligation of furnishing ships of war when called upon. The city, however, suffered severe calamities during the Servile War in Sicily (134–132 BC), having fallen into the hands of the insurgent slaves, who, on account of the great strength of its position, made it one of their chief posts and were able for a long time to defy the arms of the consul Publius Rupilius. They held out until they were reduced to the most fearful extremities by famine, when the citadel was at length betrayed into the hands of the consul by one of their leaders named Sarapion, and the whole of the survivors put to the sword.

Tauromenium again played a conspicuous part during the Sicilian wars of Sextus Pompeius, son of Pompey the Great, and, from its strength as a fortress, was one of the principal points of the position which he took up in 36 BC, for defence against Octavian (later Imperator Caesar Augustus). It became the scene also of a sea-fight between a part of the fleet of Octavian, commanded by the triumvir in person, and that of Pompeius, which terminated in the defeat and almost total destruction of the latter. The victor selected Tauromenium to receive a Roman colony, probably as a measure of precaution, on account of the strength of its situation, as we are told that he expelled the former inhabitants to make room for his new colonists. Strabo speaks of it as one of the cities on the east coast of Sicily that was still subsisting in his time, though inferior in population both to Messana and Catana. Both Pliny and Ptolemy assign it the rank of a colonia, and it seems to have been one of the few cities of Sicily that continued under the Roman Empire to be a place of some consideration. Its territory was noted for the excellence of its wine, and produced also a kind of marble which seems to have been highly valued. Juvenal also speaks of the sea off its rocky coast as producing the choicest mullets.

== Middle Ages ==
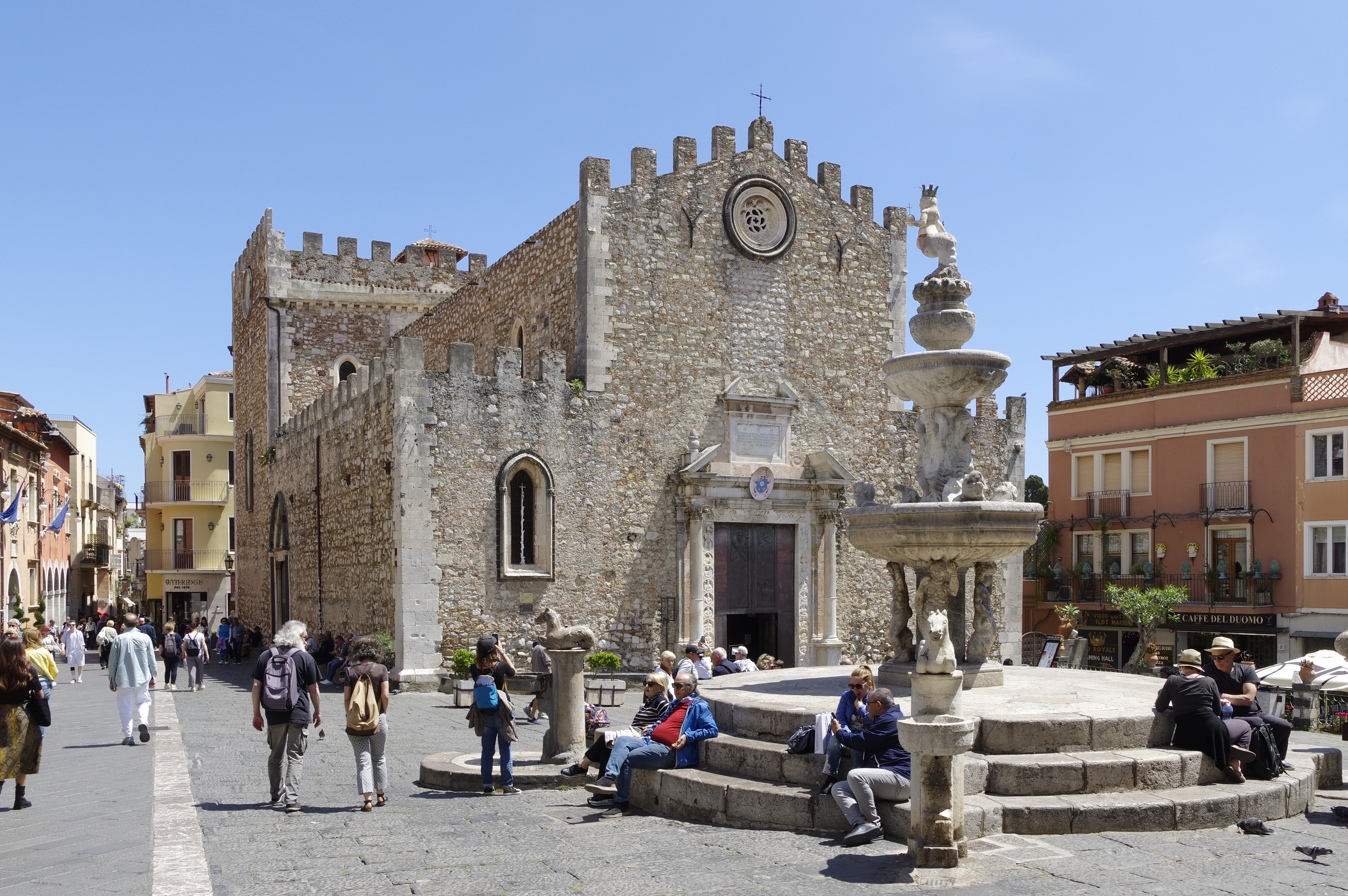
The Duomo dates from the 13th century

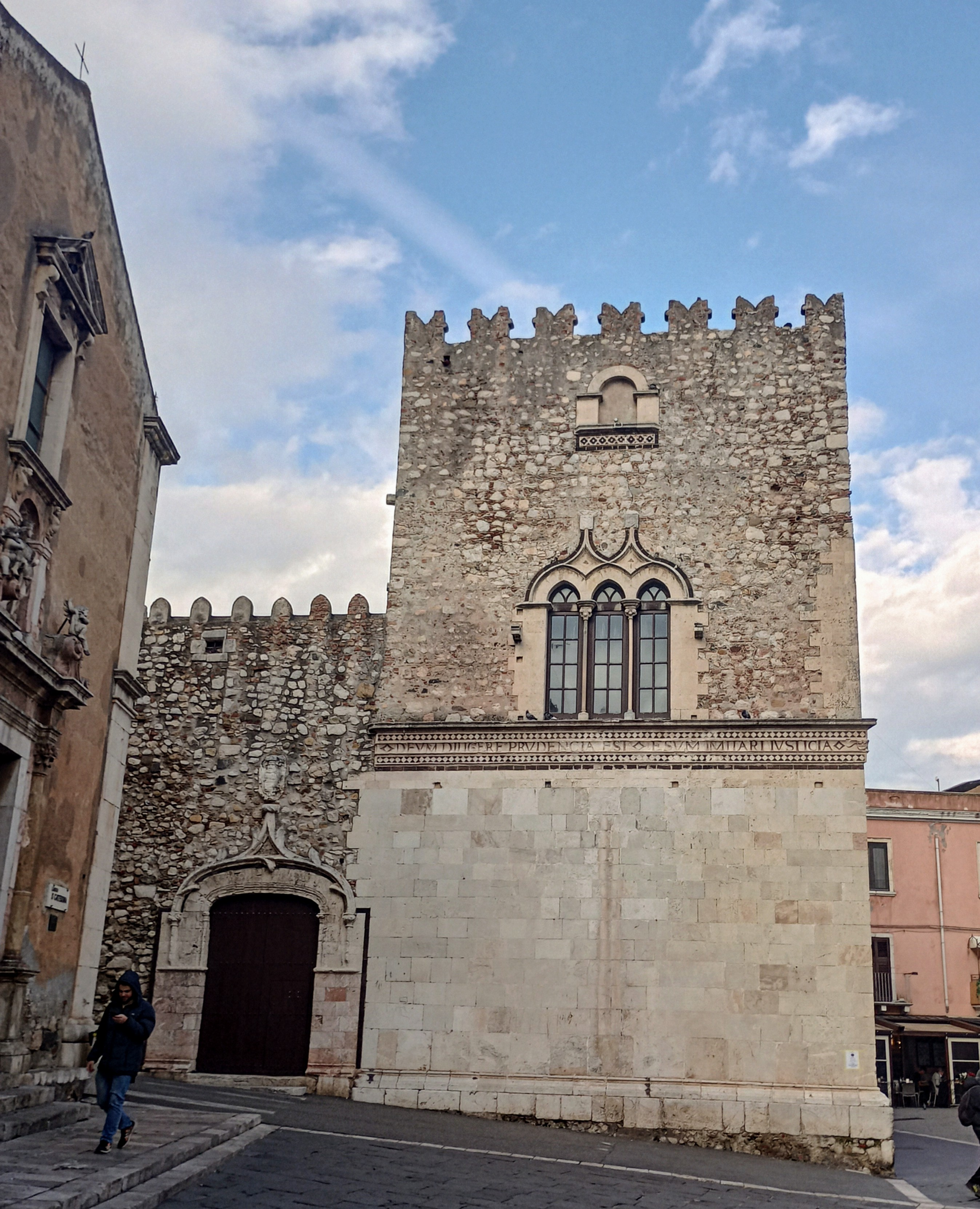
Exterior of the 13th century Palazzo Corvaja showing the Gothic influence.

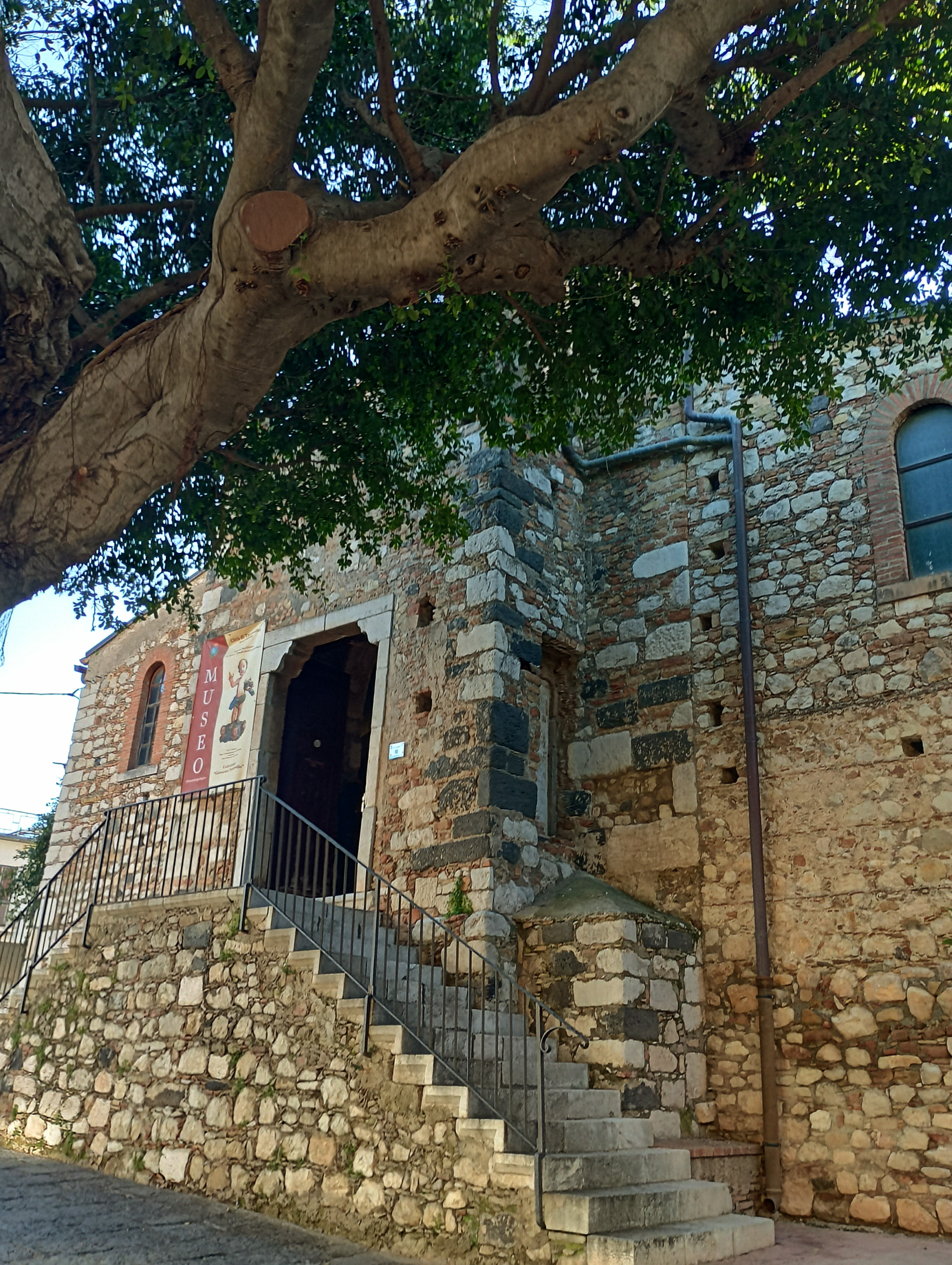
The ex San Francesco di Paola Church located in the Cuseni quarter served as the original cathedral in Taormina

After the fall of the Western Roman Empire, and the Gothic Wars, Taormina found itself as part of Byzantine Empire. With the Muslim intrusion into Sicily, Taormina's importance grew as a Byzantine foothold. By the end of the 9th century, most of Sicily had fallen to the Emirate of Sicily, limiting Byzantine control to just Catania and Taormina. The devastation of Byzantine naval raids and the excessive cruelty of the Emir drove Messina to revolt unsuccessfully. The defeated rebels fled to Taormina, and drew the Emir into conquering Taormina and Catalania in 902, during which many Christian residents were enslaved. But in 911, the Christian population successfully drove the Muslim rulers from the city. For eight years, Muslims made attempts to retake the city without success, but in 919 a new emir made a truce, which lasted until 962 when Fatimids had stabilized their rule over the island. Taormina fell in siege of 30 weeks. Taormina was renamed "Al-Mu'izziyya" in honour of Caliph al-Mu'izz (reigned 953–75).

Muslim rule of the town (see History of Islam in southern Italy) lasted until 1078, when it was captured by the Norman count Roger I of Sicily. At this time Taormina and the surrounding Val Demone were still predominately Greek speaking.

After the fall of the Normans and of their German (imperial) heirs, the Hohenstaufen, Taormina followed the history of Sicily under the Angevins and then the Crown of Aragon. In 1410 King Martin II of Sicily was elected here by the Sicilian Parliament. Later Taormina was under Spanish suzerainty, receiving the status of "city" in the 17th century.

In 1675 it was besieged by the French, who had occupied Messina. The troops sacked the town destroying the top part of the Middle Tower that divides Taormina between the ancient Greco-Roman section and the later medieval southern zone.

== Modern age ==
=== Beginnings of tourism ===
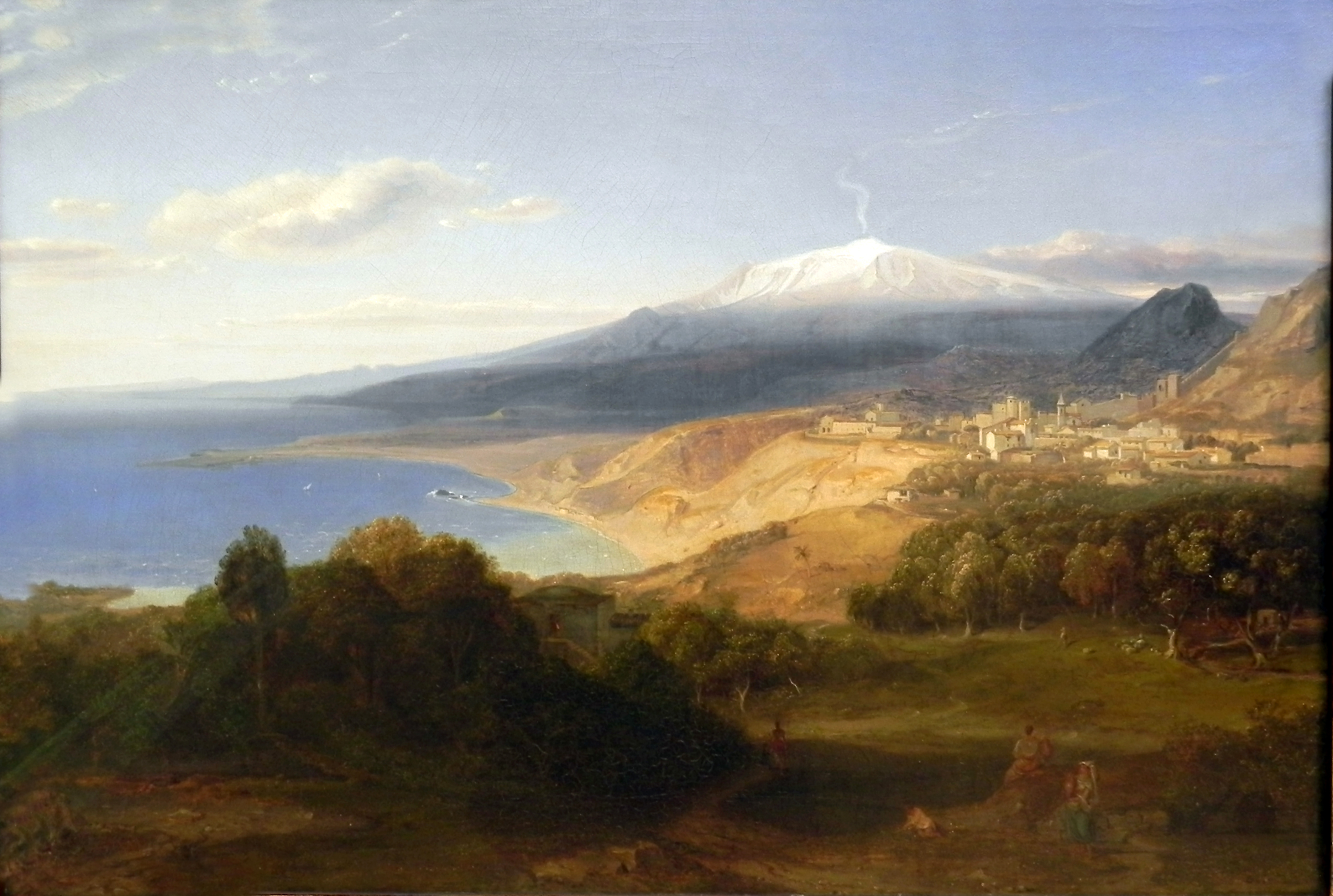
"Taormina and Etna" by Carl Rottmann, 1829.

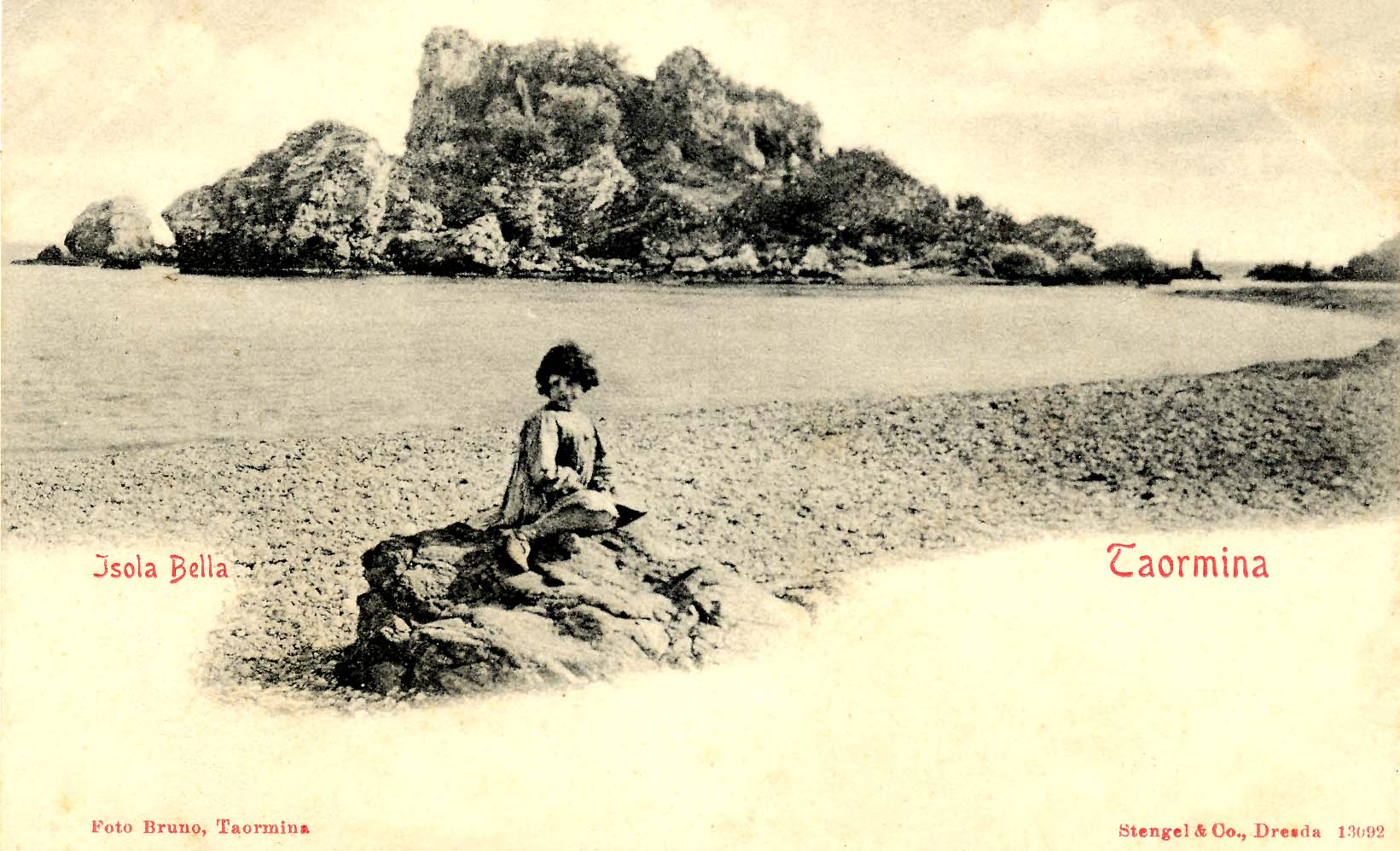
Isola Bella and child. Photo by Giuseppe Bruno.

Under the Bourbon dynasty of the Kingdom of Two Sicilies, which lasted until 1860, Taormina did not have a relevant role; however, it obtained an easier access when the Catrabico promontory was partially cut and a seaside road connecting it to Messina and Catania was created. Eventually it received also a station on the second-oldest railroad in the region.

Travellers, usually well-off northern European men on a sort of Grand Tour, brought Taormina, and especially the ruins of the Ancient Greek theatre, to international attention. One of the first was Patrick Brydone, who wrote A Tour through Sicily and Malta, in a Series of Letters to William Beckford, Esq., of Somerly in Suffolk, published in 1773. Soon afterwards Henry Swinburne visited; his Travels in the two Sicilies. 1777-1780 was published in 1783. Johann Wolfgang von Goethe visited in 1786, but did not publish Italian Journey until 1816.

Following the Unification of Italy in 1860, a German landscape painter moved to Taormina. Otto Geleng (1843-1939) was one of the first artists to capture the beauties of Sicily, and his exhibitions in Berlin and Paris lured northern Europeans to see for themselves. He married an Italian woman and settled in Taormina, renovating a palazzo into the first full-scale hotel to greet these visitors. In the 1870s he served as mayor.

Charlotte Hood, 3rd Duchess of Bronté, an English woman who had married into a Sicilian dukedom, purchased land in Taormina in 1867.

=== Gay heyday ===
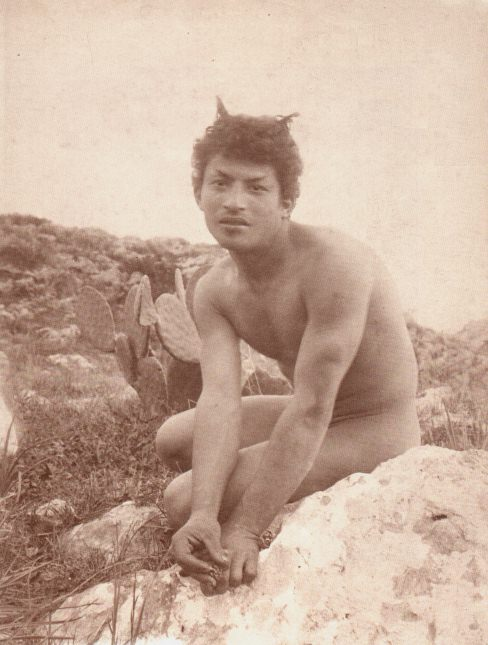
"The Great Faun" by Wilhelm von Gloeden.

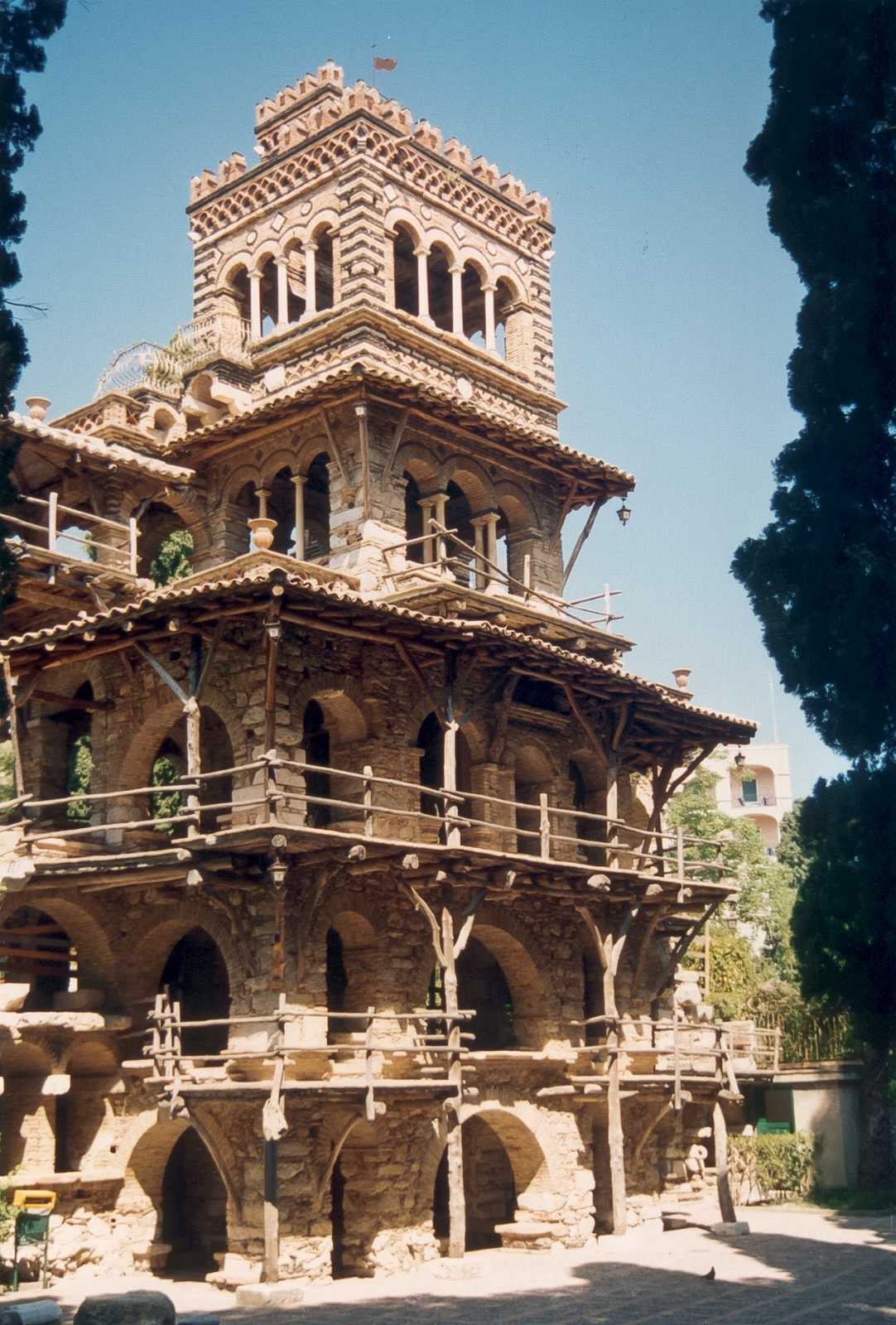
The largest of Florence Trevelyan's "follies" in the Giardino Pubblico.

It was in 1878 that Geleng's countryman Wilhelm von Gloeden took up residence in the town and changed its destiny. He spent most of his career as a photographer, of landscapes and of male nudes, both of which drew more attention to Taormina. "Largely as a consequence of his photographs' popularity, the town became a tourist resort with good hotels." Gloeden learned from and worked with two Italian photographers, Giovanni Crupi (1859–1925) and Giuseppe Bruno (1836-1904). Edward Chaney, an expert on the evolution of the Grand Tour and of Anglo-Italian cultural relations, described the town as attracting "male refugees from more repressive climates"; the Labouchere Amendment, under which Oscar Wilde had in 1895 been sentenced to two years' hard labour, made Britain particularly risky to live in. Von Gloeden's studio drew high-ranking clientele: on one day in 1904, his visitors' book was signed by Kaiser Wilhelm II as well as Philipp, Prince of Eulenburg and Kuno von Moltke (of the Harden–Eulenburg affair).

Many European wanderers appreciated the charms of the town. Richard Wagner and his wife Cosima spent the 1881-1882 winter and early spring in Sicily, and on a day trip to Taormina, the composer expressed the wish that "we should have fled there in 1858 and spared ourselves many torments. The children could have lived on prickly pears!"

The wealthy and well connected Florence Trevelyan settled at Taormina in 1884, staying first at the famous Hotel Timeo. She loved birds (and dogs, but was not fond of cats) and purchased Isola Bella, now a nature reserve, to protect the sea bird habitat. In 1890 she married Salvatore Cacciola, a doctor and for many years mayor of Taormina. She built as her marital residence a substantial villa on Via Teatro Greco, now known as Palazzo Acrosso-Papale. She bought hillside land and created an urban pleasure garden, with shade and views, which after her death became a public municipal park.

In December 1897, after leaving prison and leaving England forever, Oscar Wilde was planning to winter in Naples with his lover Lord Alfred Douglas; the couple made a short visit to Capri, but their presence proved too scandalous for even that liberal island, so "Bosie" headed back to England and Wilde made his way to Taormina. He spent much of his time at the studio of von Gloeden. A few years before, the first edition of The Studio: An Illustrated Magazine of Fine and Applied Art had featured the nudes of von Gloeden next to Aubrey Beardsley's treatment of Wilde's Salome: "there was nothing undeliberate or coincidental about Wilde's choice of Taormina as his destination."

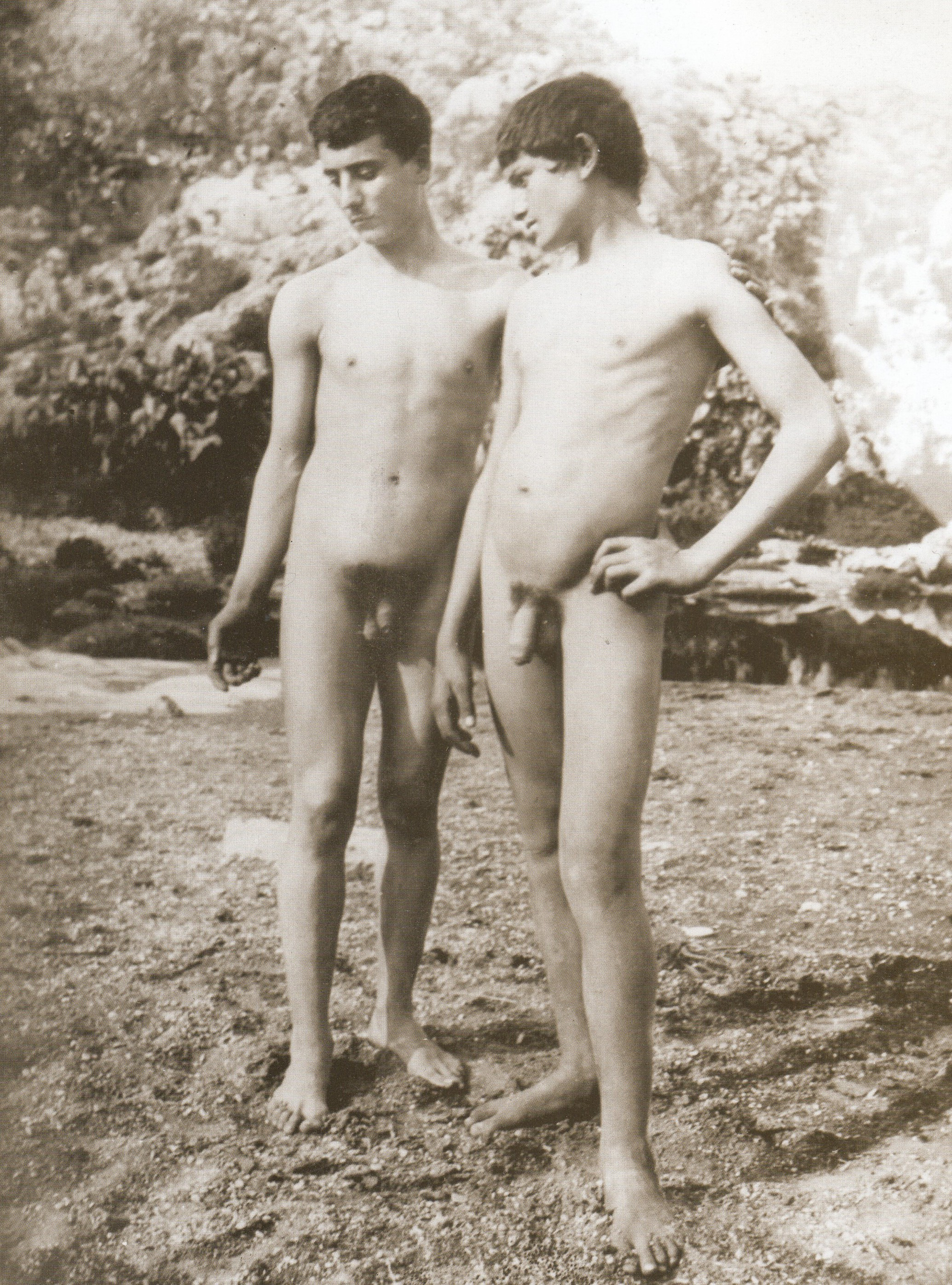
Wilhelm von Gloeden (1856-1931), Two boys standing nude, side by side, on a beach. Catalogue number: 0493A. Cm 18x24.

In 1905, the English artist Robert Hawthorn Kitson, heir to Kitson and Company but driven from Britain by homophobia, built a house in Taormina. He commissioned Frank Brangwyn to design murals and furniture for the Casa Cuseni. Alfred East also contributed. In 1907, the English architect C. R. Ashbee, a prime mover of the Arts and Crafts movement, came to Taormina on commission from an old client. Colonel Shaw-Hellier set him the task of designing the Villa San Giorgio, Biographer Fiona MacCarthy judges it "the most impressive of Ashbee's remaining buildings"; it is run as the Hotel Ashbee. In 1911 Alexander Hood, 5th Duke of Bronté began building a house, La Falconara, on his grandmother's land. Alex Hood was, like his father, a discreet courtier, and unlike his father, discreetly homosexual as well. With his close friend and frequent guest the writer Robert Hichens (best known for The Green Carnation (1894), a satire of Hichens's friends Wilde and Bosie), Hood helped to further establish Taormina (like Capri) as a "holiday resort for wealthy homosexuals from Northern Europe", as historian Lucy Riall put it. One such escapee, Albert Stopford, the art dealer and confidant to royalty, cultivated roses in his Edwardian garden.

The Polish composer Karol Szymanowski was deeply affected by his time in Taormina before the war. Arthur Rubinstein reported the difference in Szymanowski: "Karol had changed; I had already begun to be aware of it before the war when a wealthy friend and admirer of his invited him twice to visit Sicily. After his return he raved about Sicily, especially Taormina. 'There,' he said, 'I saw a few young men bathing who could be models for Antinous. I couldn't take my eyes off them.' Now he was a confirmed homosexual. He told me all this with burning eyes." Szymanowski completed the manuscript of a two-volume novel, Efebos, which took homosexuality as its subject. ("Efebos" or ephebos means the Greek term for a male adolescent.)

=== Edwardian resort ===
Just after the turn of the century, Douglas Sladen published Sicily: A New Winter Resort, and by 1904 Taormina had seven hotels, whereas a generation before there had been only one, according to Bernard Berenson, an American art historian. The experienced journalist Elizabeth Bisland, who had raced around the world in competition with Nellie Bly, arrived in Taormina for a more leisurely stay in early 1908; somehow her hotel booking had gone astray, and she describes in Seekers in Sicily traipsing up and down the town, seeking a room for the night. The names are still familiar, the establishments still extant, in one form or another: from Castel-a-Mare to Metropole, from San Domenico to Timeo, ending up at the pensione Villa Schuler.

During the early 20th century, the town became a colony of expatriate artists, writers and intellectuals. Charles Webster Leadbeater, the theosophical author, found out that Taormina had the right magnetic fields for Jiddu Krishnamurti to develop his talents, so the young Krishnamurti spent part of 1912 in the city.

=== After World War I ===
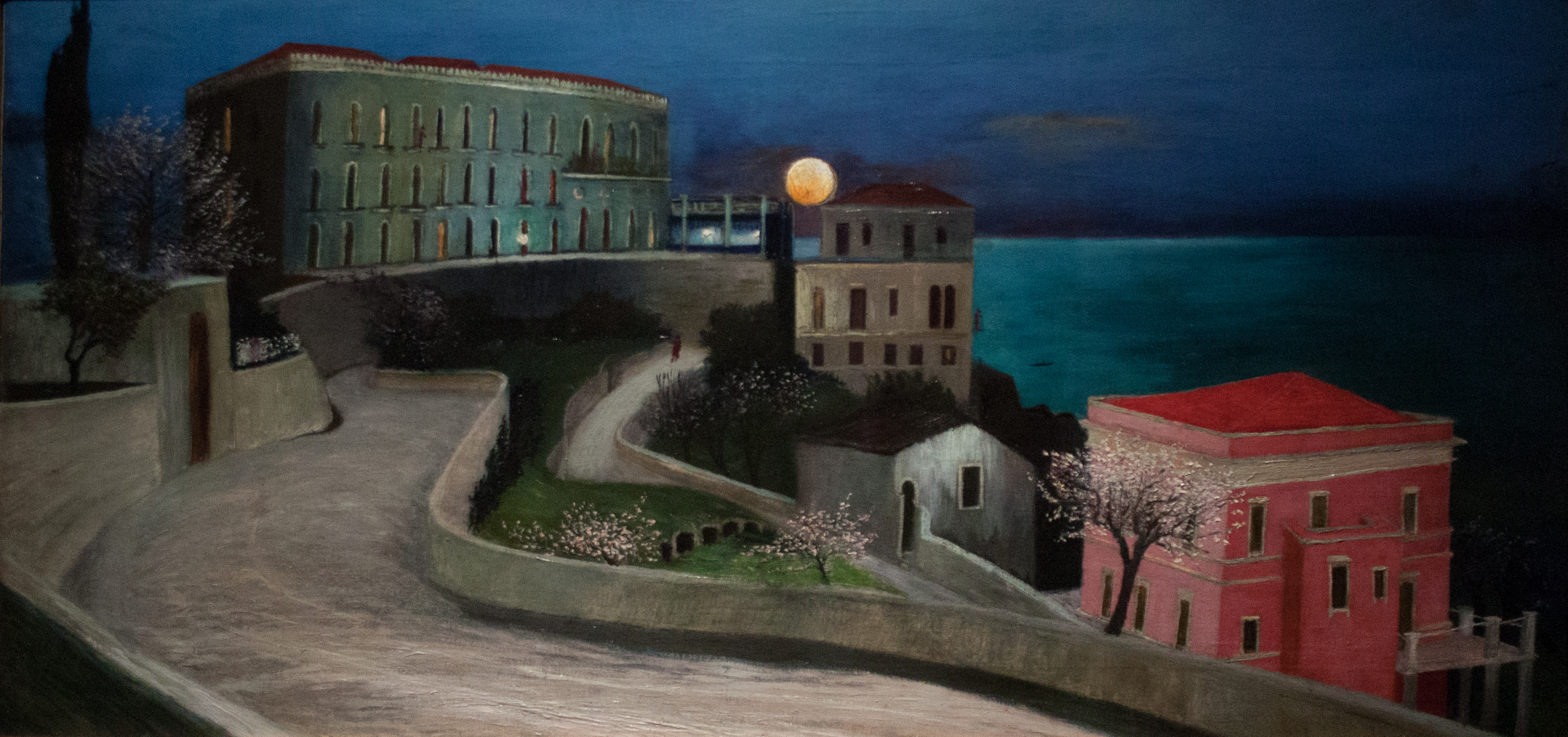
"Full Moon over Taormina" by Tivadar Csontváry Kosztka, 1901.

Taormina became "high on the list of places to be visited by homosexual northerners", according to Gregory Woods, Chair in Gay and Lesbian Studies. Capri had a similar reputation, as tolerant of gay men and artists. Jacques d'Adelswärd-Fersen, who settled in Capri and built Villa Lysis, visited Gloeden in 1923, bringing with him his schoolboy lover/secretary.

Ethel Smyth, the English composer, travelling in 1920 with the Irish novelist Edith Somerville, found Taormina full of "colonies of Oscar Wilde-men". D. H. Lawrence stayed at the Fontana Vecchia from 1920 to 1922. (He wrote a number of his poems, novels, short stories and essays, and the travel book Sea and Sardinia.) Icelandic writer Halldór Laxness, who won the Nobel Prize in Literature in 1955, wrote most of his first novel, Vefarinn mikli frá Kasmír ("The Great Weaver from Kashmir"), in Taormina during the summer of 1925; he praised the town highly in his book of autobiographical essays, Skáldatími ("The Time of the Poet", 1963). In the spring of 1925, the reigning British monarchs, George V and Queen Mary, paid a private visit to Taormina. As they were holidaying on the royal yacht nearby, they sent a message to their former courtier, Alec Hood, and he welcomed them to La Falconara, where a plaque in the garden commemorates their visit.

By this time Taormina had become "a polite synonym for Sodom", as Harold Acton described it.

=== World War II ===
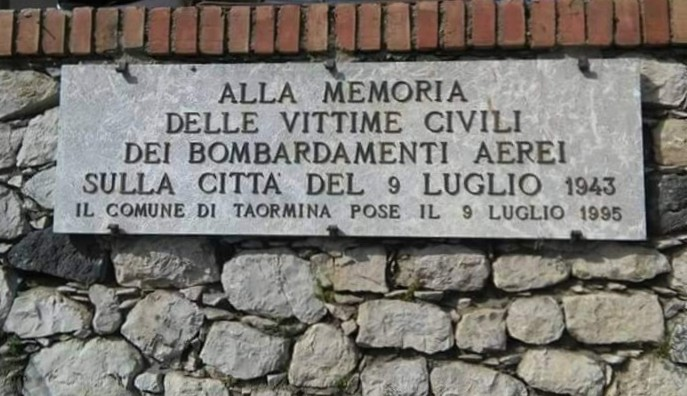
Memorial plaque in Piazza Sant'Antonio commemorating the civilians killed in the Allied air raids on 9 July 1943

Taormina was the headquarters of the German Wehrmacht Command in Sicily during World War II. On 9 July 1943, the feast of the patron saint Pancrazio, two separate Allied bombardments killed over 100 civilians and caused considerable destruction in parts of the southern end around Porta Catania and the old Cuseni quarter. The German High Command was holding a meeting in the San Domenico hotel and although it was hit by bombs and sustained damage, only Saint Agnes's church within the hotel was completely destroyed. The villa of Wilhelm Von Gloeden which fronted the hotel was razed to the ground.

A plaque memorial to the people who lost their lives in the raids is located in Sant'Antonio Square outside Porta Catania.

The city was liberated by British troops of 50th Northumbrian division on 15 August 1943.

=== Post war ===
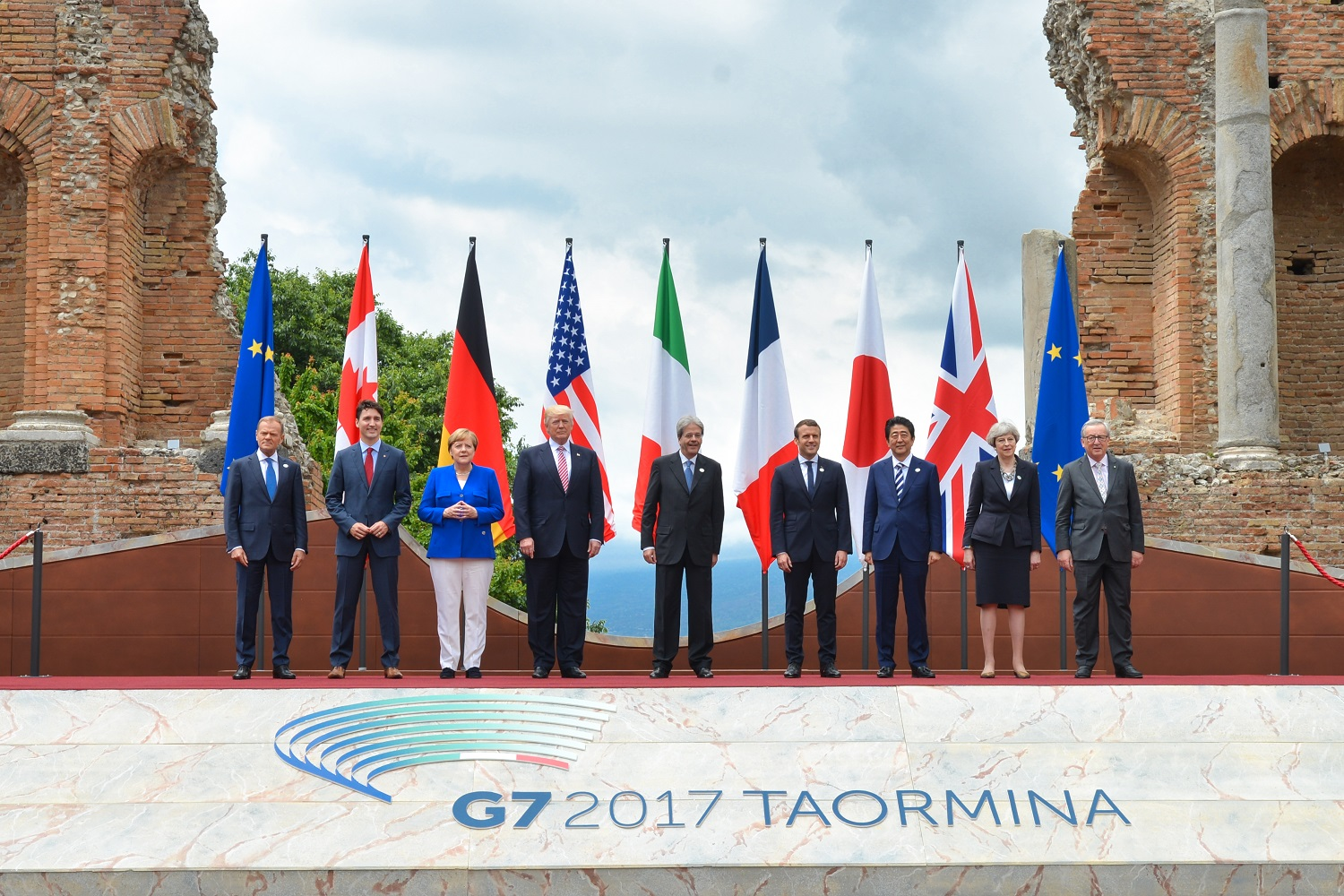
World leaders gathered for a group photo at Greek amphitheatre for the 43rd G7 summit held at Taormina

After the war, Acton was visiting Taormina with Evelyn Waugh and, coming upon a board advertising "Ye Olde English Teas” he sighed and commented that the town 'was now quite as boring as Bournemouth'.

Kitson's elaborately decorated house, Casa Cuseni, and its extensive gardens, were inherited by his niece Daphne Phelps just after the war. She intended to sell, but ended up staying, running the place as a pensione for half a century, with guests such as Bertrand Russell, Roald Dahl, Henry Faulkner, and Tennessee Williams. In 1999 she wrote A House in Sicily about life in Taormina in general and Casa Cuseni in particular.

From April 1950 through September 1951, the Fontana Vecchia was home to Truman Capote, who wrote of his stay in the essay of that name. Jean Cocteau and Jean Marais visited the place. Sex researchers Alfred Kinsey and his wife Clara McMillen were taken by Kenneth Anger to interview one of Gloeden's models, now an old man, in 1955. Even when Taormina was thoroughly discovered, Carlo Levi judged it "one of the most renowned places on earth, and none of the trappings of its fame are sufficient to ruin it".

The 43rd G7 summit was held in the town on 26–27 May 2017.
