= Tyndarion =

Tyndarion may refer to the following :

- Tyndarion (Greek: Τυνδάριον) was an ancient name of Tindari, a city and former bishopric of Sicily, now a Latin Catholic titular see
- Tyndarion (tyrant) (Greek: Τυνδαρίων) was tyrant of ancient Tauromenium
