= Euryalus fortress =

Fortification in Syracuse, Italy

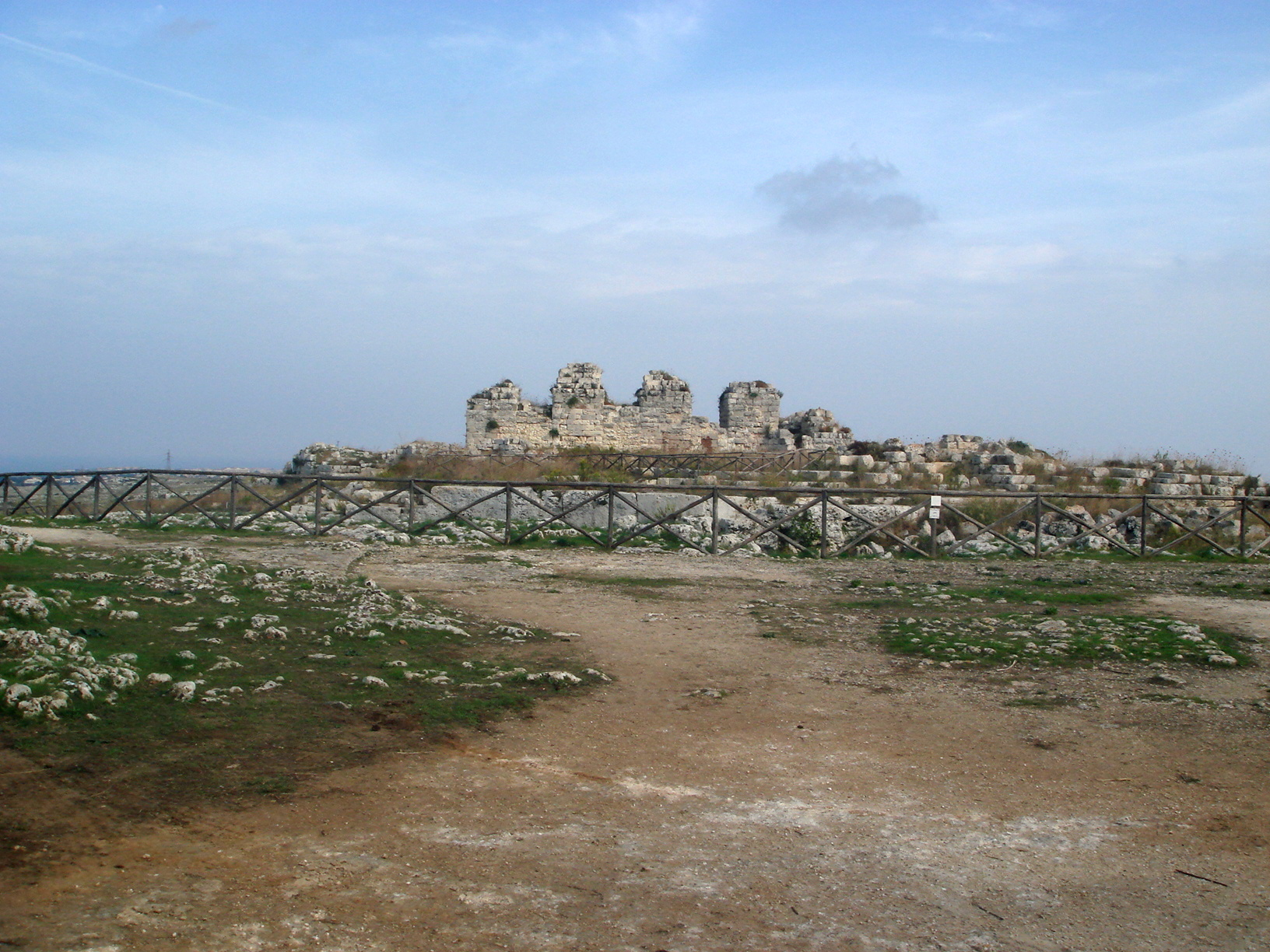
View of the tetrapylon from west

The Euryalus Fortress located in the frazione of Belvedere, was the key point in the fortifications of the ancient Greek city of Syracuse, Magna Graecia. It is located on the highest point of the hill of Epipolae (about 120 metres above sea level), around 7 km northwest of Syracuse.

== History ==
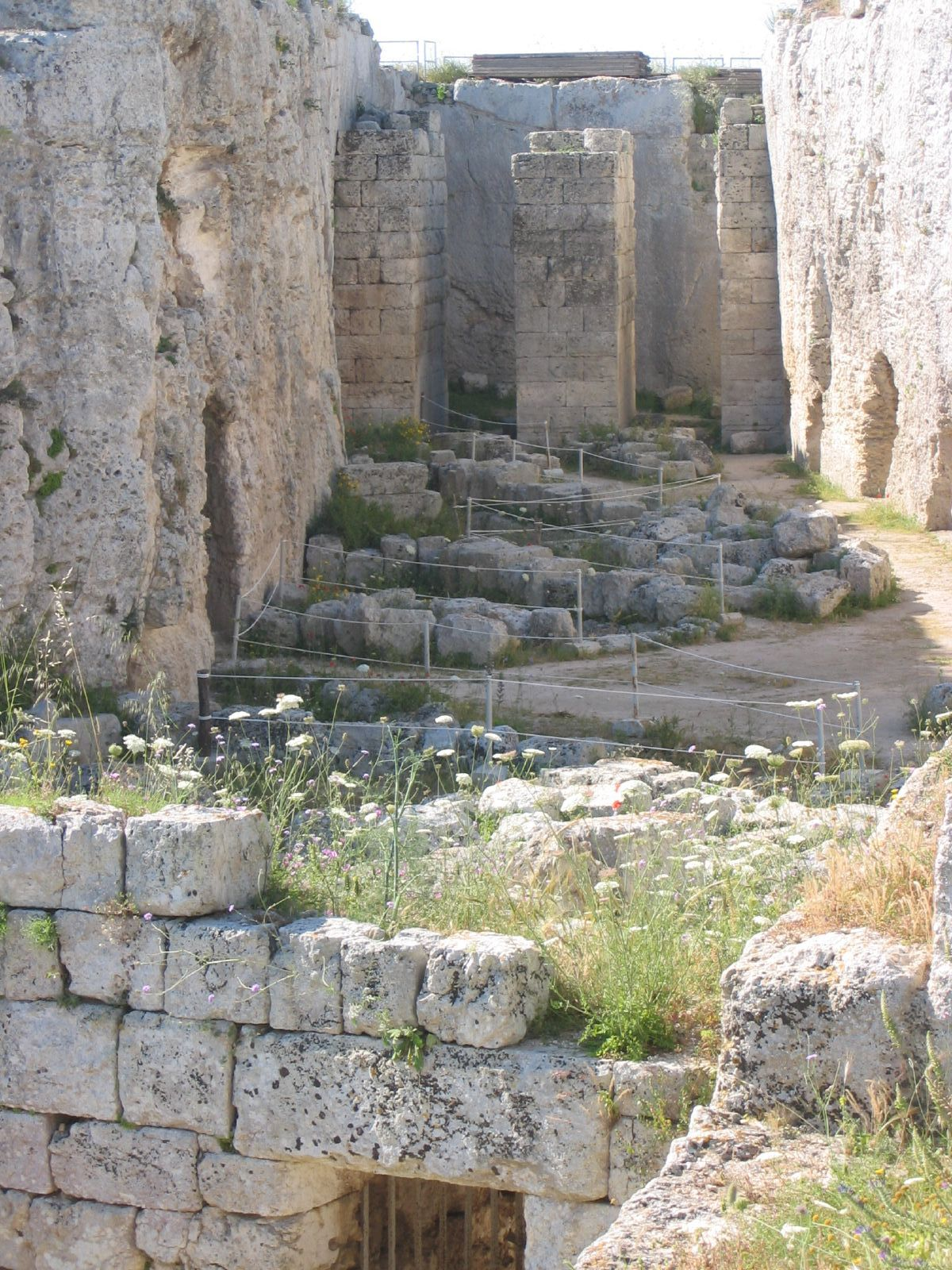
The third moat. In the background, the remains of the drawbridge are visible.

During the Athenian invasion of Sicily (415-413 BC), the fortress did not yet exist, but the strategic importance of the area was clear; the Athenians initially captured the hill, but their failure to retain it prevented them from effectively besieging the city. The name Euryalus is mentioned by Thucydides in the course of the first Athenian attack on the city. Later in his account, after the reconquest of Epipolae from the Athenians by the Syracusans, a Syracusan garrison on the site is mentioned.

In light of this experience, the fortress was first established by Dionysius I, tyrant of Syracuse. Construction took place between 402 and 397 BC, with the intention that the fortress would protect the city from siege and attack by the Carthaginians. Various renovations were subsequently undertaken in response to developments in siege weaponry, under Agathocles and Hiero II.

After the Roman conquest of the city in 212 BC by Marcus Claudius Marcellus, the fortress continued to be modified until the Byzantine period when parts of it were torn apart in order to repair the rest in light of Muslim invasion.

In 1939, King Victor Emmanuel III visited the monument in an official capacity. In 1941, during the Second World War, the artefacts in the Syracuse archaeological museum were carried by mule to the fortress and hidden in its tunnels, so that they would be safe from aerial bombardment.

On 30 September 2016, an antiquarium was opened on the site, after a long closure resulting from the Santa Lucia earthquake of 1990. This building contains some of the discoveries from the site, including a sword, a helmet, and the missiles from a stone-throwing catapult.

== Description ==
=== Moats ===
The entrance to the fortress is protected by three ditches and one lateral ditch. The first and smallest ditch is 6 metres long and 4 metres deep (see A on the map below). The second is 86 metres away from the first and is around 50 metres long (B). It defends a forward bastion, behind which is a third ditch which is 17 metres long and 9 metres deep (D) which links the defensive system with the tunnels. In the south part of this ditch, there is a draw bridge which allows one to cross the ditch from one set of fortifications to the other (C and E). There was also an internal staircase which allowed access to C from ditch D. Finally, on the south side, there was a fourth ditch (H), which protected the shallowest part of the lateral slope of Epipolae. Tunnels link this ditch with ditch D.

=== Fortifications ===
Between the ditches is the central fortress which has a rectangular shape (G, erroneously listed as "C" on the map). Beyond ditch D, the central fortress which was open in the Greek period, is closed by five square towers (pentapylon), which were probably about 15 metres high with crenellations on top as well as 4th century BC rainwater spouts in the shape of lions' heads, now kept in the Museo Paulo Orsi. The towers were probably platforms for catapults. Near the central fortress there are three large cisterns which could provide water in the event of a siege.

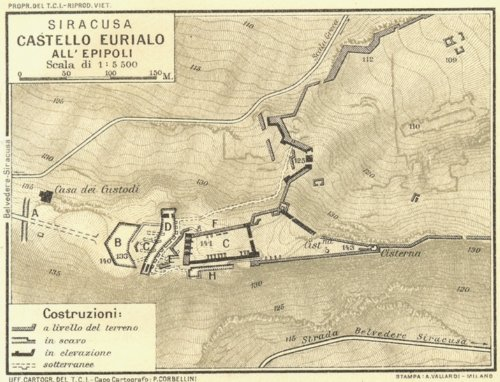
Plan of the fortress

Beyond the central fortress, there is a large wall, where the entrance to the castle was (called the Tryolon because it is made up of three gates) at the east end, which is about 5 metres thick which links the whole complex to the Dionysian walls. It was defended by further towers and a double vaulted entranceway. The west end was linked to the fortress at a high point of the plateau, near a cistern and a watchtower.

=== Strategic elements ===
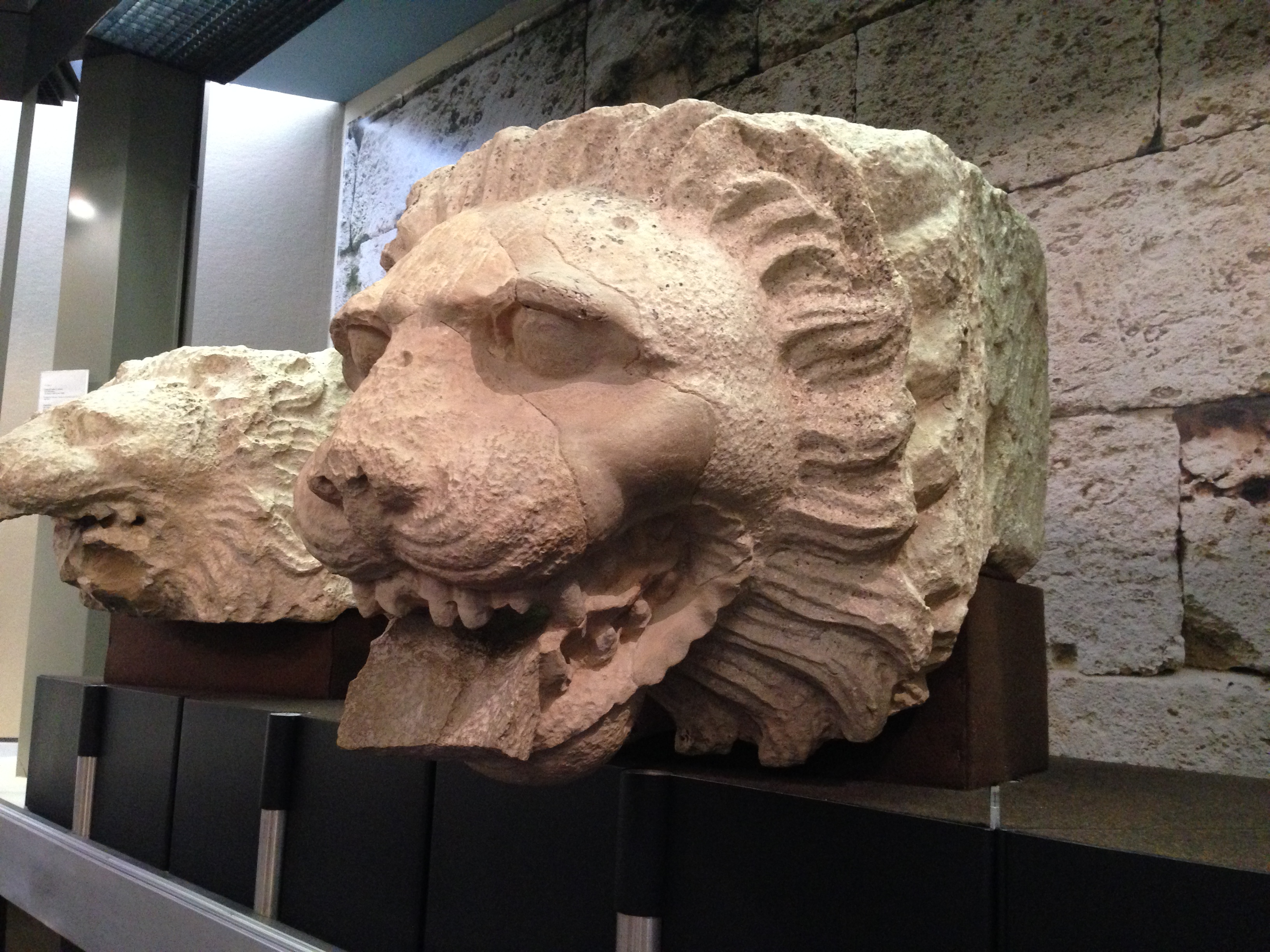
water spout in the shape of a lion's head, from the central fortress

The whole construction consists of different strategic elements which serve to surprise attackers. The complex system of galleries allowed troops to move from one part of the fortress to another without being seen from outside.

The ditches on the north side of the castle are visible only when one is very close to them, so that in an attack, there would have been a real danger of falling in and being killed by sentries, especially during rapid assaults. Additionally, there are many places in which it is possible to conceal defending troops in ambush - like the large number of galleries

The tripylon was built in a way that limits frontal attacks on the city and such that the Dionysian walls limited line-of-sight to the right of the gate, as well as attacks with battering rams. The side towers and the fortifications also limit the effectiveness of an attack. The gate is linked to a gallery which allows movement between ditch D and H.

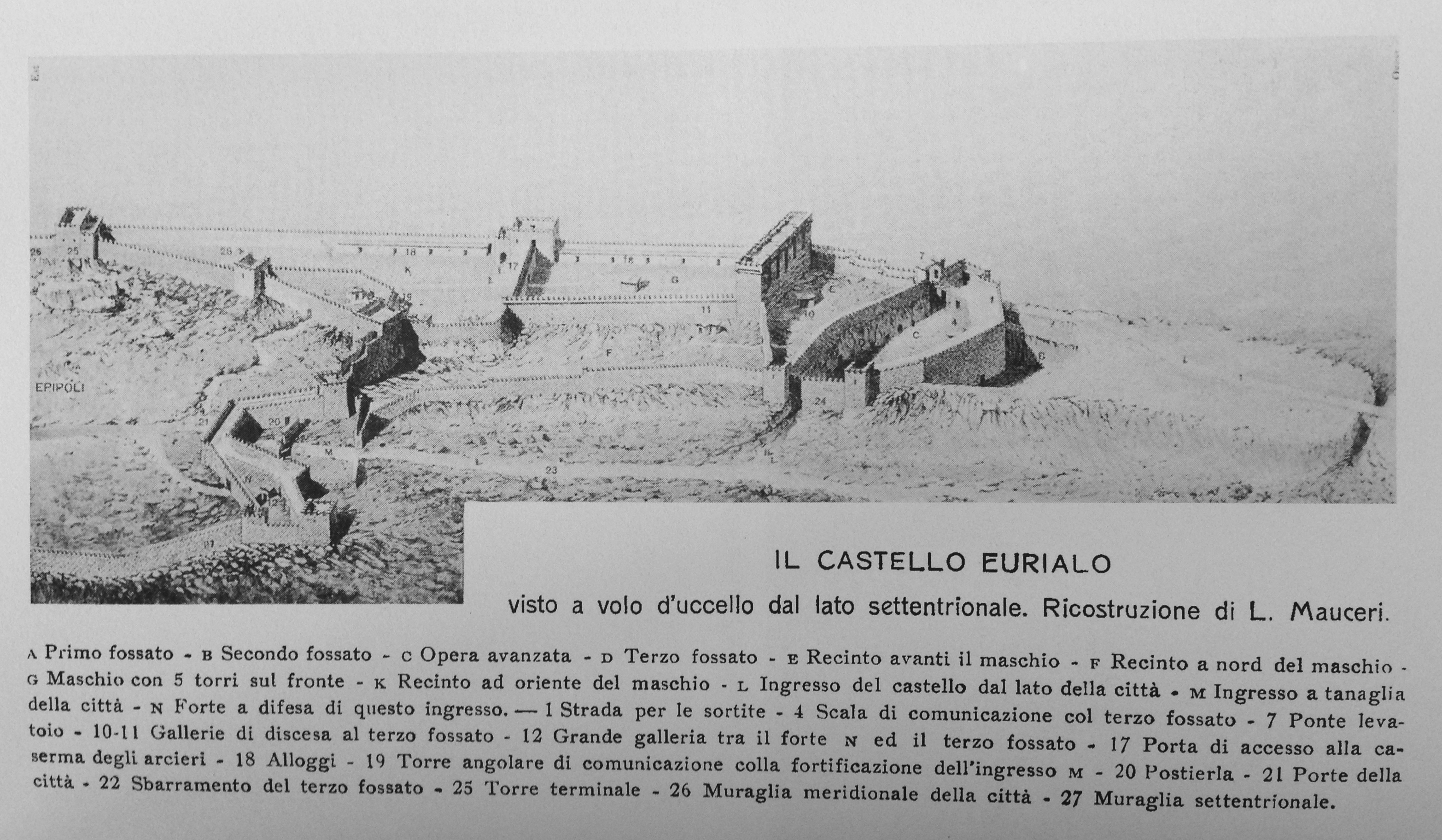
Reconstruction of the fortress according to Luigi Mauceri

== Gallery ==
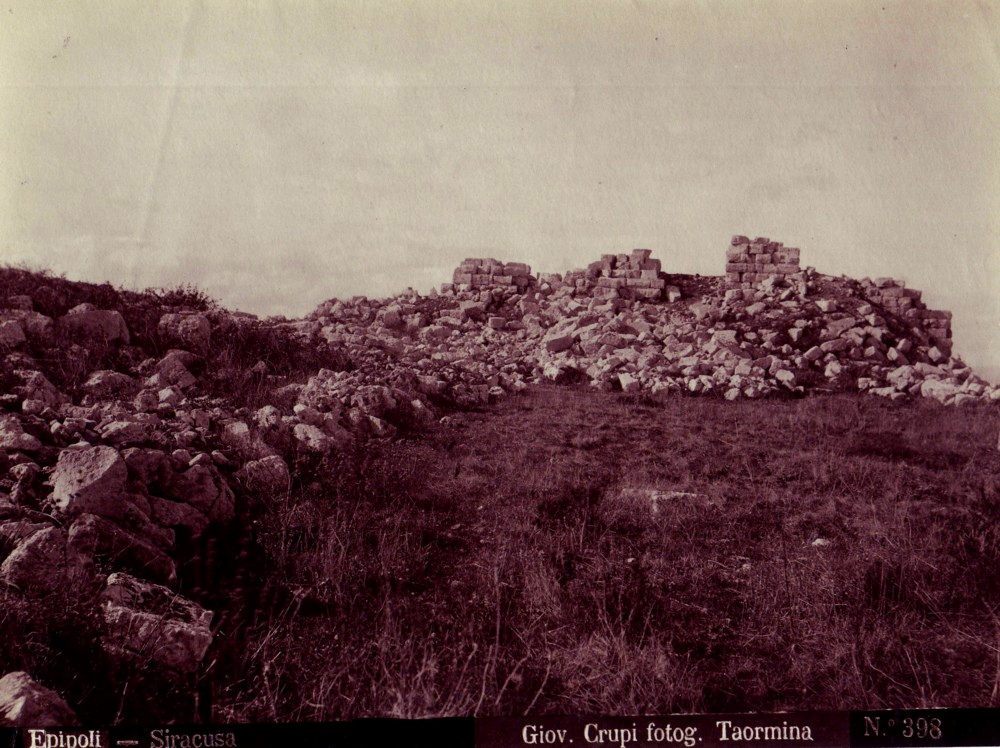
The pentapylon in a photo by Giovanni Crupi.

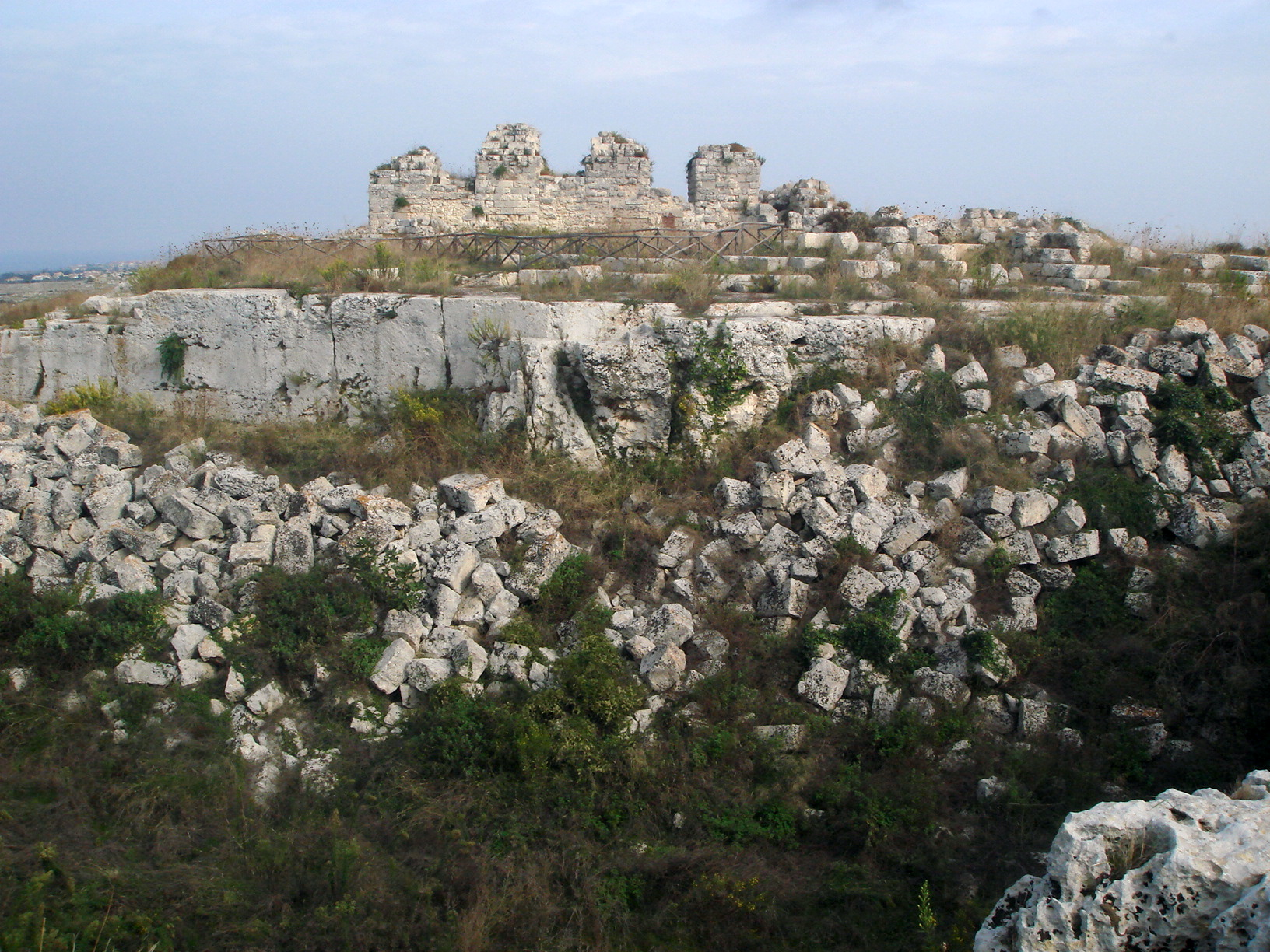
The pentapylon today

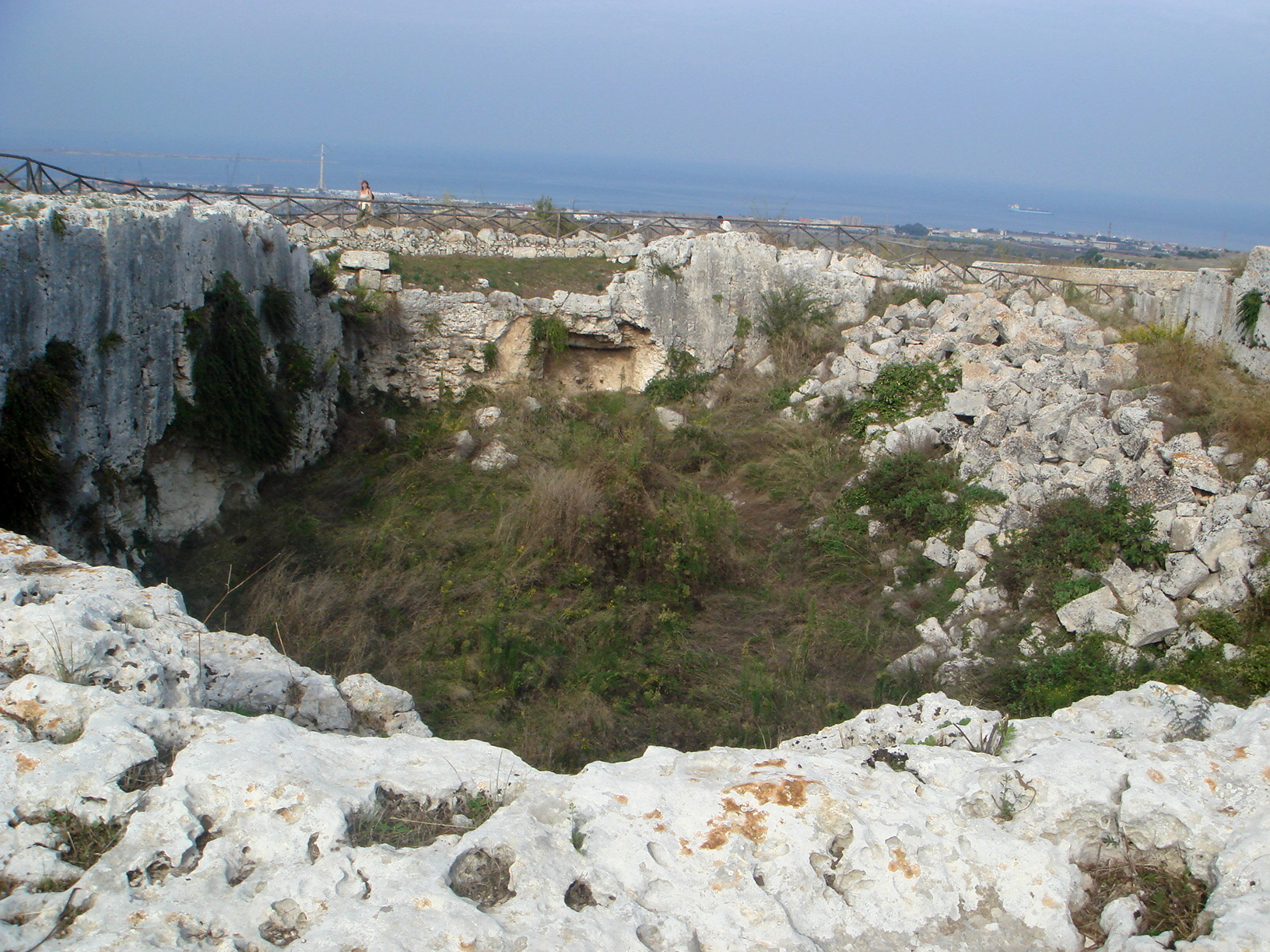
The remains of the imposing second ditch

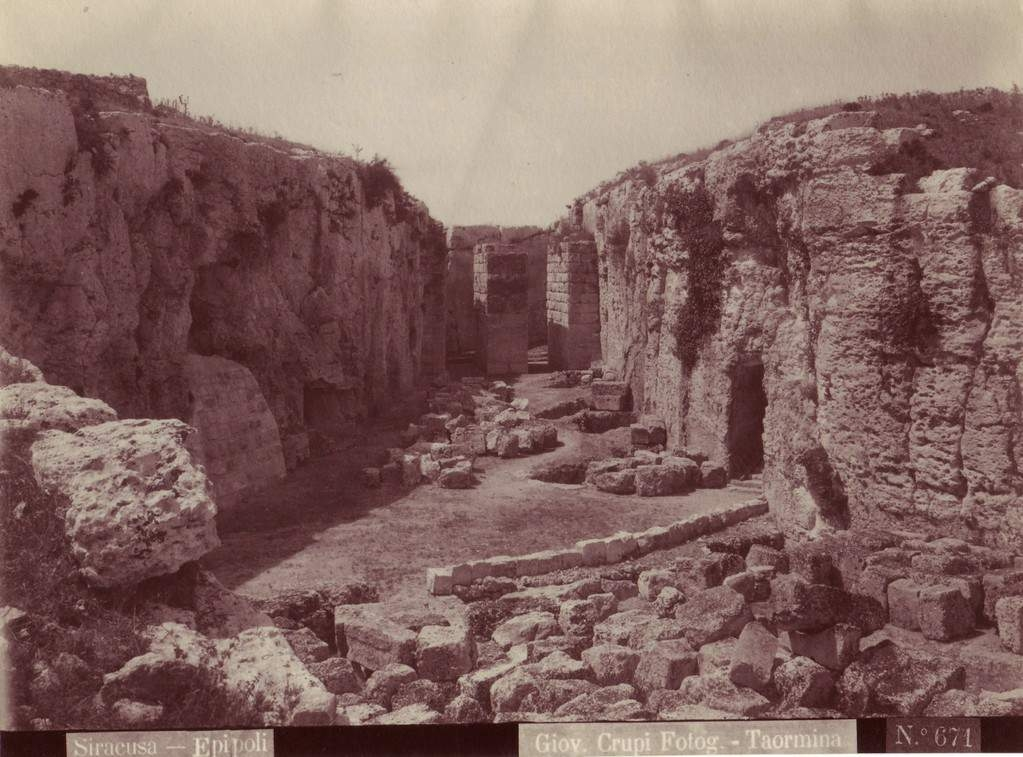
The third ditch in a photo by Giovanni Crupi.

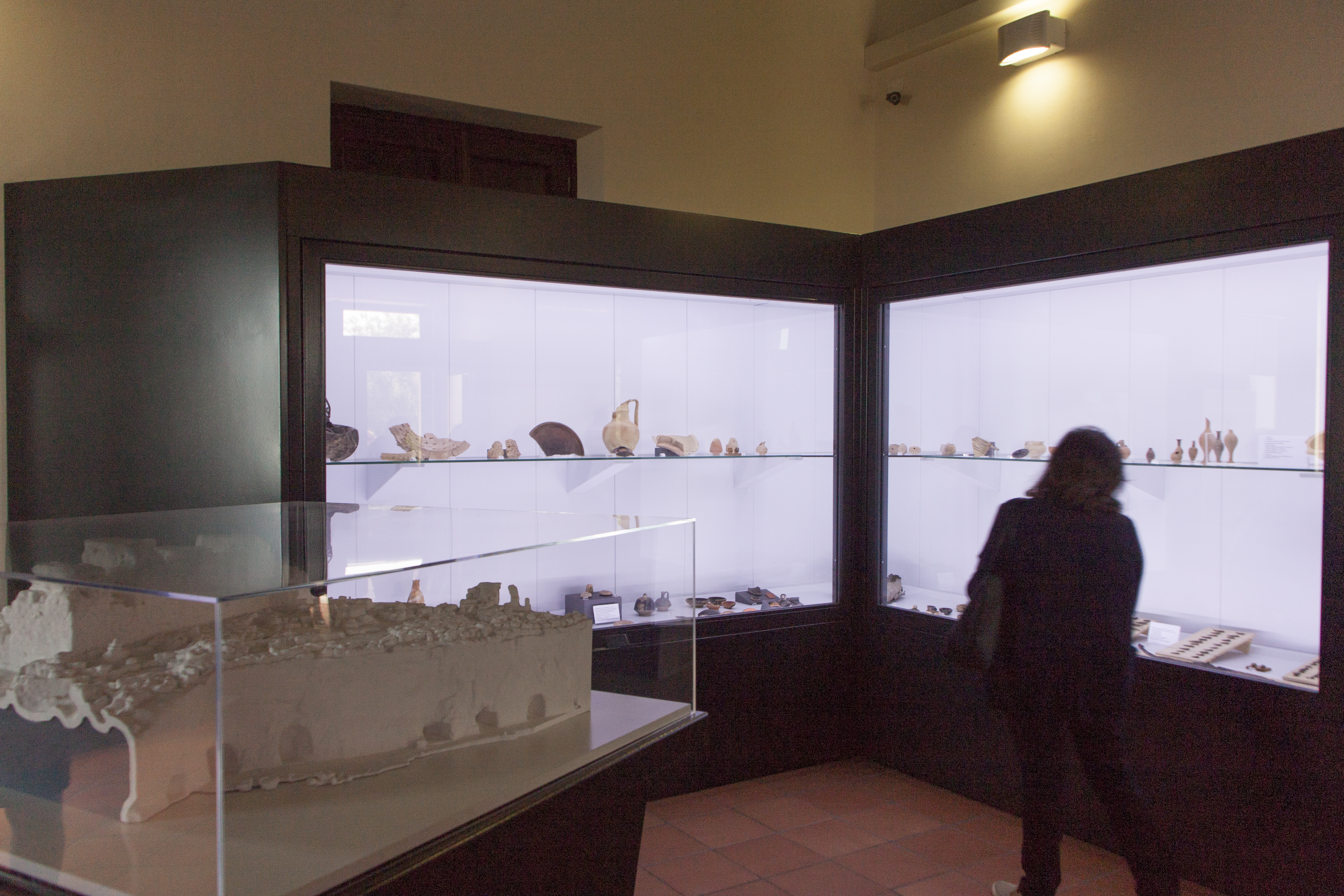
Vitrine

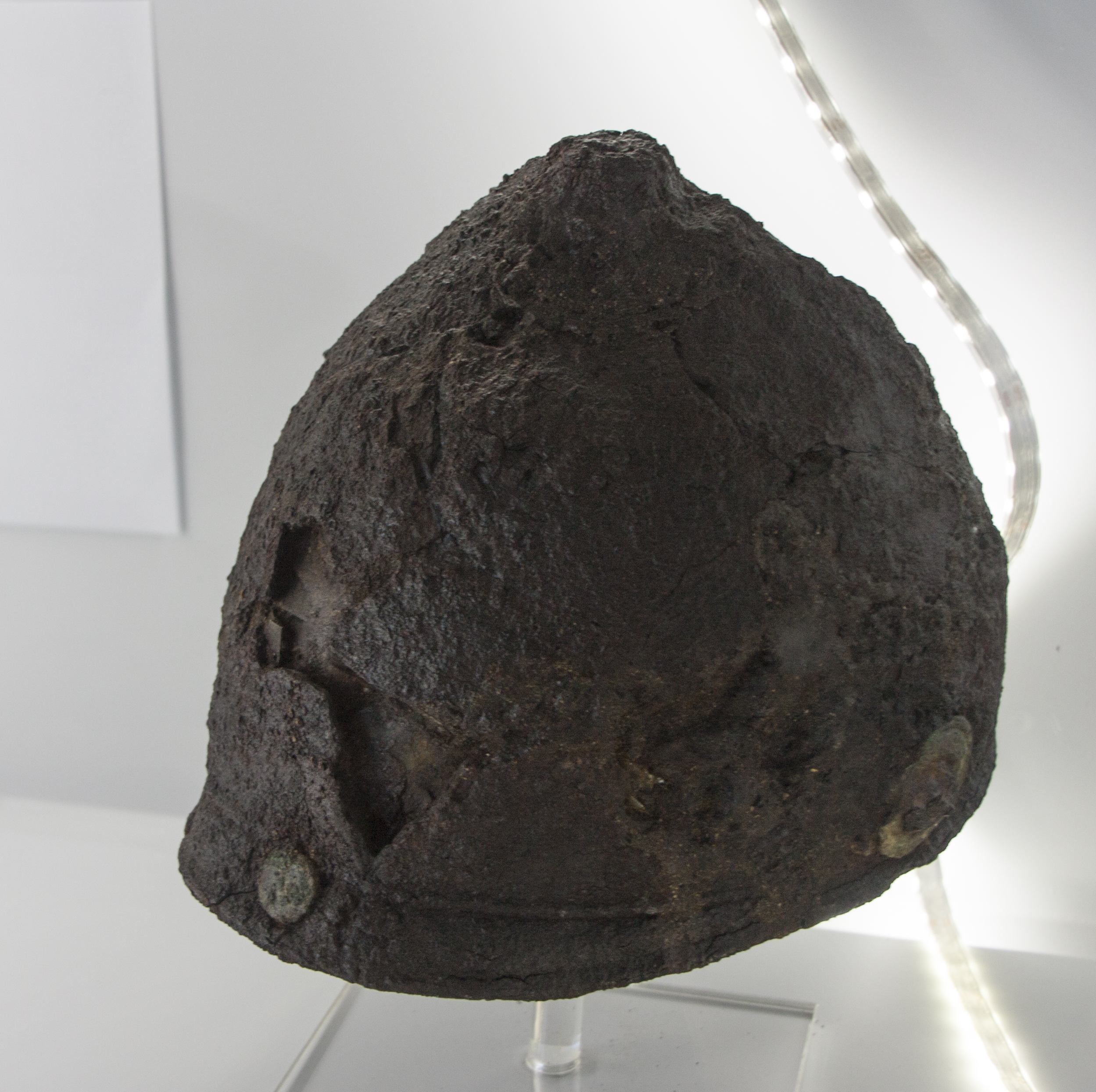
Helmet

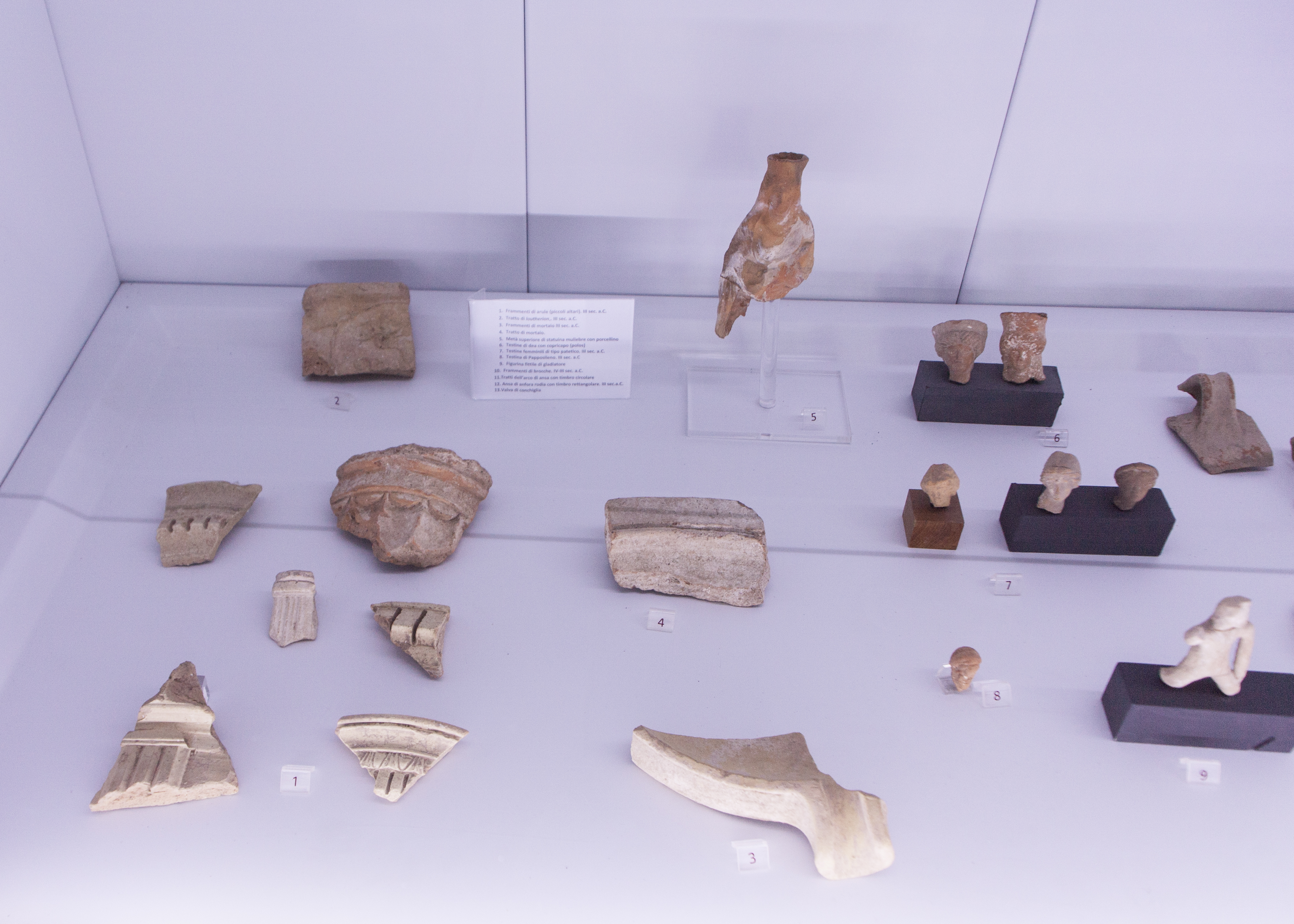
Fragments of pottery

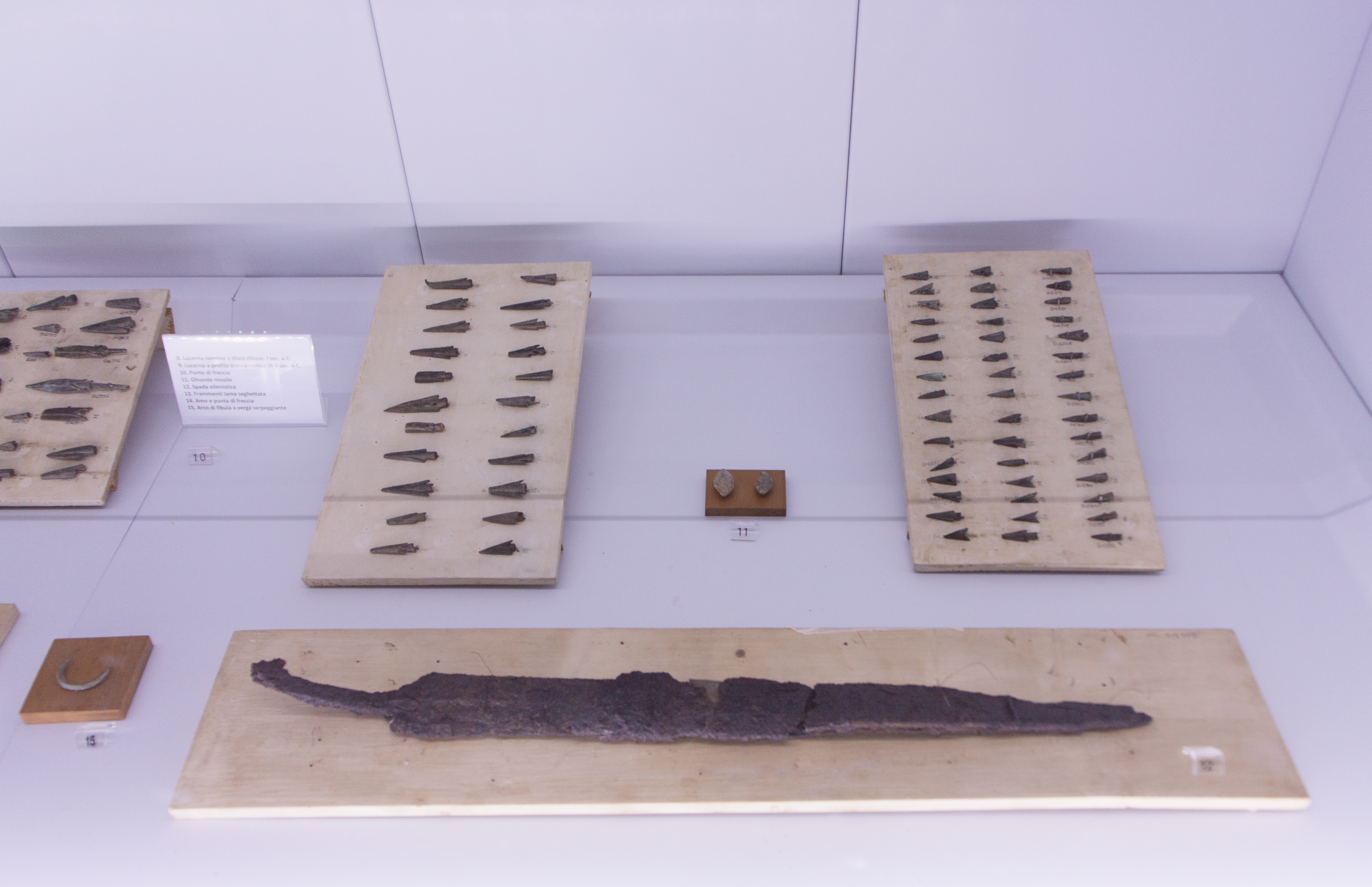
Sword and spearheads

== See also ==
- Sicilian Wars
