= Corrado Segre =

Italian mathematician (1863–1924)

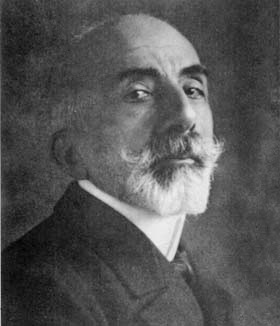
- Born: 20 August 1863; Saluzzo, Kingdom of Italy
- Died: 18 May 1924 (aged 60); Turin, Kingdom of Italy
- Education: University of Turin
- Known for: Segre classification Segre cubic Segre embedding Segre surface Zeuthen–Segre invariant
- Relatives: Beniamino Segre (cousin's son)
- Scientific career
- Fields: Mathematics
- Workplaces: University of Turin
- Academic advisors: Francesco Faà di Bruno
- Notable students: Gino Fano; Beppo Levi; Beniamino Segre; Francesco Severi

Corrado Segre (20 August 1863 – 18 May 1924) was an Italian mathematician who is remembered today as a major contributor to the early development of algebraic geometry.

== Early life ==
Corrado's parents were Abramo Segre and Estella De Benedetti.

== Career ==
Segre developed his entire career at the University of Turin, first as a student of Enrico D'Ovidio. In 1883 he published a dissertation on quadrics in projective space and was named an assistant to professors in algebra and analytic geometry. In 1885 he also assisted in descriptive geometry. He began to instruct in projective geometry, as a stand-in for Giuseppe Bruno, from 1885 to 1888. Then for 36 years, he had the chair in higher geometry following D'Ovidio. Segre and Giuseppe Peano made Turin known in geometry, and their complementary instruction has been noted as follows:

"in the mid 1880s, these two very young researchers, Segre and Peano, both of them only just past twenty and both working at the University of Turin, were developing very advanced points of view on fundamental geometrical issues. Although their positions were quite different from one another, they were in some way more complementary than opposed. So it must come as no surprise that Turin was the cradle of some of the most interesting studies on such issues."

The Erlangen program of Felix Klein appealed early on to Segre, and he became a promulgator. First, in 1885 he published an article on conics in the plane where he demonstrated how group theory facilitated the study. As Hawkins says (page 252) "the totality of all conics in the plane is identified with P^{5}(C)". The group of its projectivities is then the group that permutes conics. About Segre, Hawkins writes

"shortly after he assumed the chair of projective geometry in Turin in 1888, he decided it would be worthwhile to have an Italian translation of the Erlangen Program because he felt its contents were not well enough known among young Italian geometers. ... Segre convinced one of the students at Turin, Gino Fano, to make a translation which was published in Annali di Matematica Pura ed Applicata in 1889. Fano's translation thus became the first of many translations of the Erlangen Program."

The inspiring Geometrie der Lage (1847) of Karl Georg Christian von Staudt provided Segre with another project. He encouraged Mario Pieri to make a translation, Geometria di Posizione (1889), while Segre composed a biographical sketch of von Staudt that was included in the publication.

Segre also expanded algebraic geometry by consideration of multicomplex numbers, in particular the bicomplex numbers. Segre's 1892 contribution to Mathematische Annalen shows him extending the work of William Rowan Hamilton and William Kingdon Clifford on biquaternions. But Segre was unaware of an earlier study of tessarines that had anticipated his bicomplex numbers.

In English, the best-known work of Segre is an inspirational essay meant for Italian students, translated by J.W. Young in 1904. It provides guidance and encouragement to young people studying mathematics.

In a 1926 memorial article, H.F. Baker called Segre the "father of" the Italian school of algebraic geometry.

The 1912 article "Higher-dimensional Spaces" (Mehrdimensionale Räume) for Enzyklopädie der mathematischen Wissenschaften spanned 200 pages. In admiration, Baker (1926) wrote and Coolidge (1927) reiterated: For completeness of detail, breadth of view, and generous recognition of the work of a host of other writers, this must remain for many years a monument of the comprehensiveness of the man.
