= Ancient theatre of Taormina =

Ancient Greek theatre in Sicily, Italy

Coordinates: 37°51′8″N 15°17′32″E

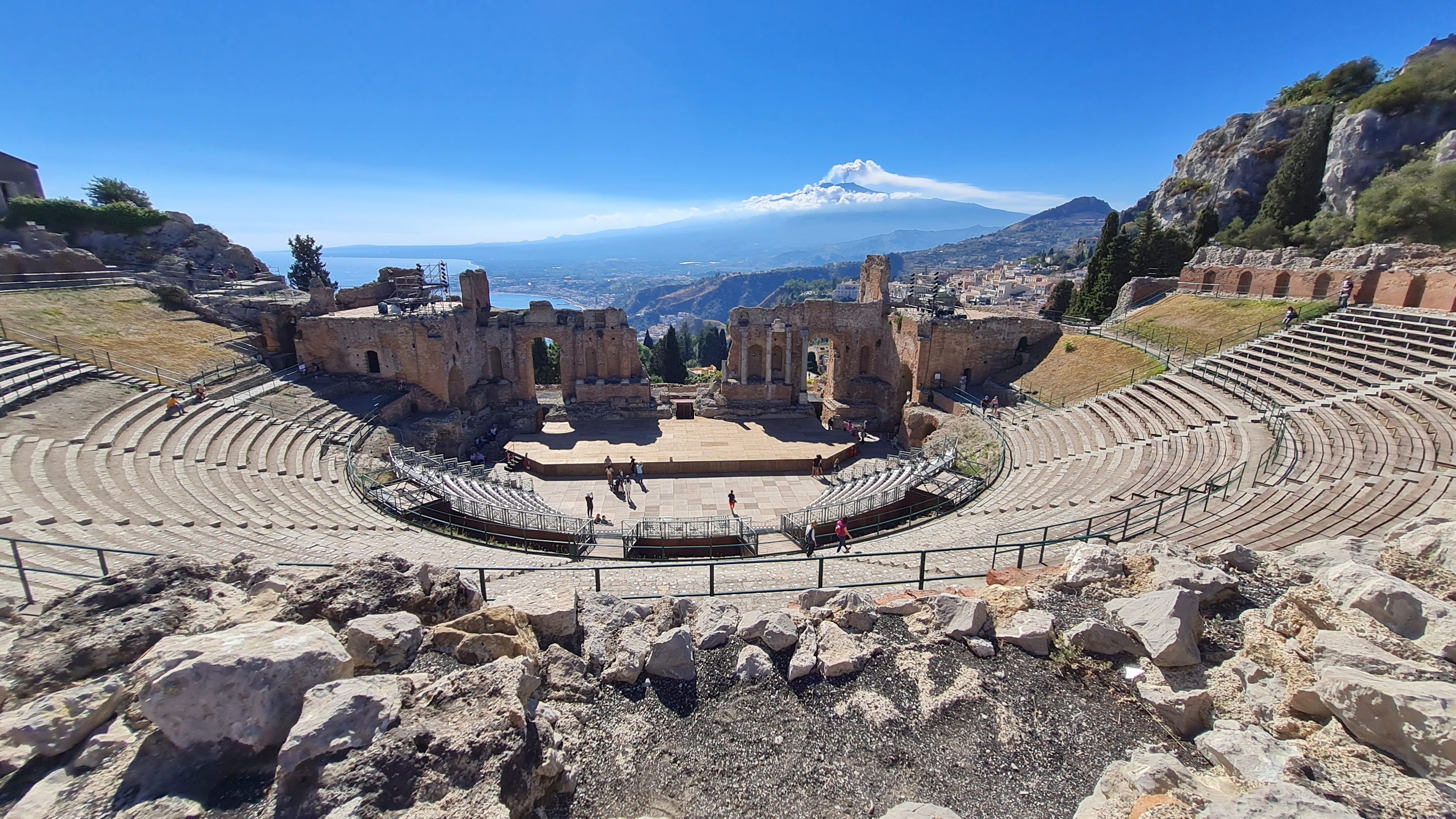
The ancient theatre of Taormina

The ancient theatre of Taormina (Italian: Teatro antico di Taormina) is an ancient Greek theatre in Taormina, Sicily, built in the third century BC.

== History ==
A Hellenistic theatre stood at Taormina from around the third century BC. The remains of another Hellenistic building have been found under the Roman cavea. Under Roman rule, the theatre was rebuilt, probably around the time of Hadrian or Trajan. It was remodelled in the third century AD, with the orchestra turned into an arena and the stage removed.

== Description ==
The ancient theatre had a diameter of 107 metres (351 ft) and could hold around 10,000 spectators. It is one of the oldest theatres in Magna Graecia to have curved cavea, rather than the older trapezoidal design. The cavea were divided into nine sections. On either side of the skene was a basilica. Today, the theatre is used as a venue for the annual Taormina Film Festival.

== In popular culture ==
The ancient theatre of Taormina is featured extensively in the 1995 film Mighty Aphrodite, starring Woody Allen, Mira Sorvino, Helena Bonham Carter, and F. Murray Abraham. Abraham in particular is shown repeatedly onstage as the leader of a Greek chorus. The theatre is also featured in season 2, episode 2, of the HBO series The White Lotus (2023).

== Gallery ==
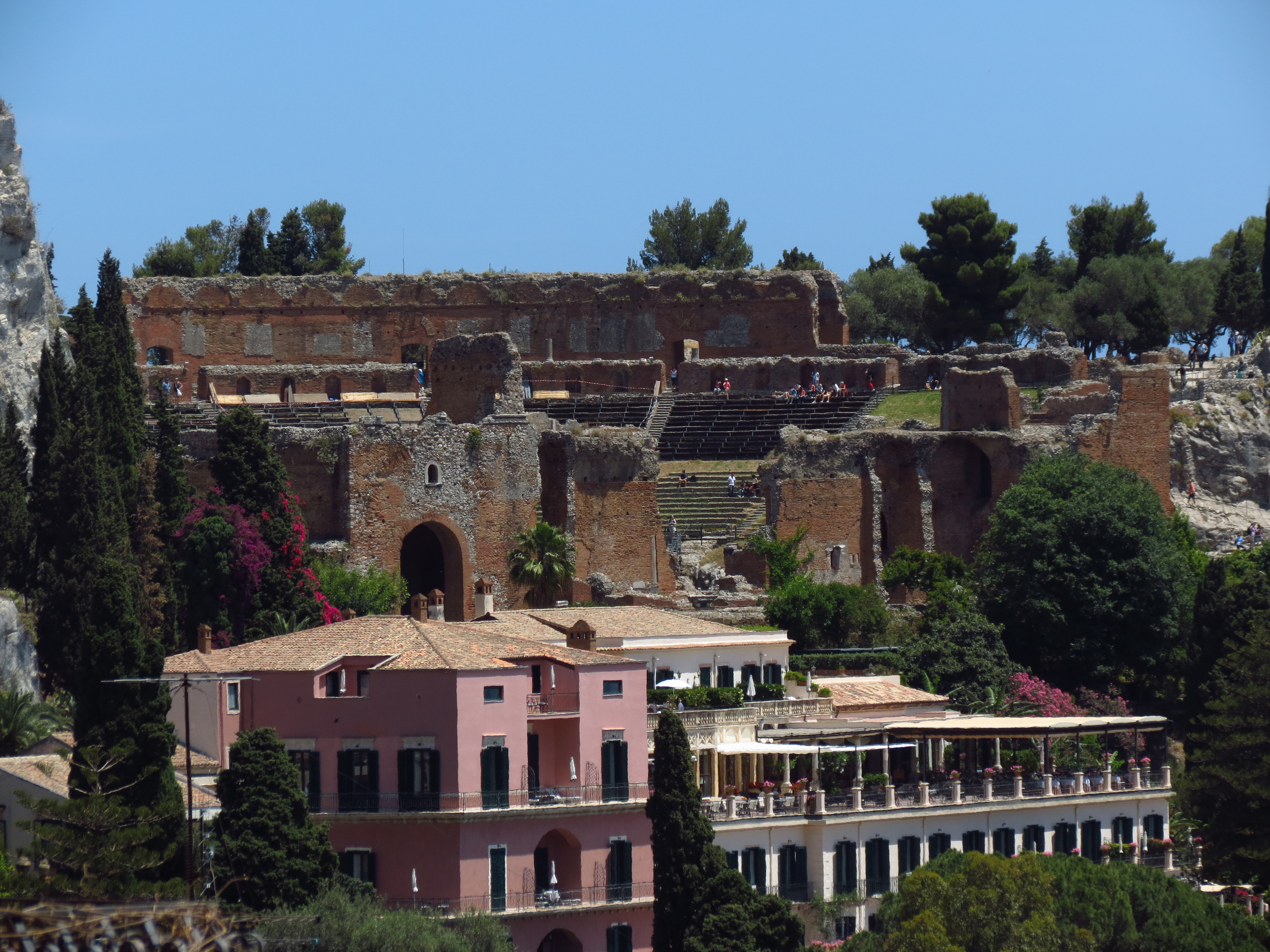
External view of the Ancient Theatre of Taormina

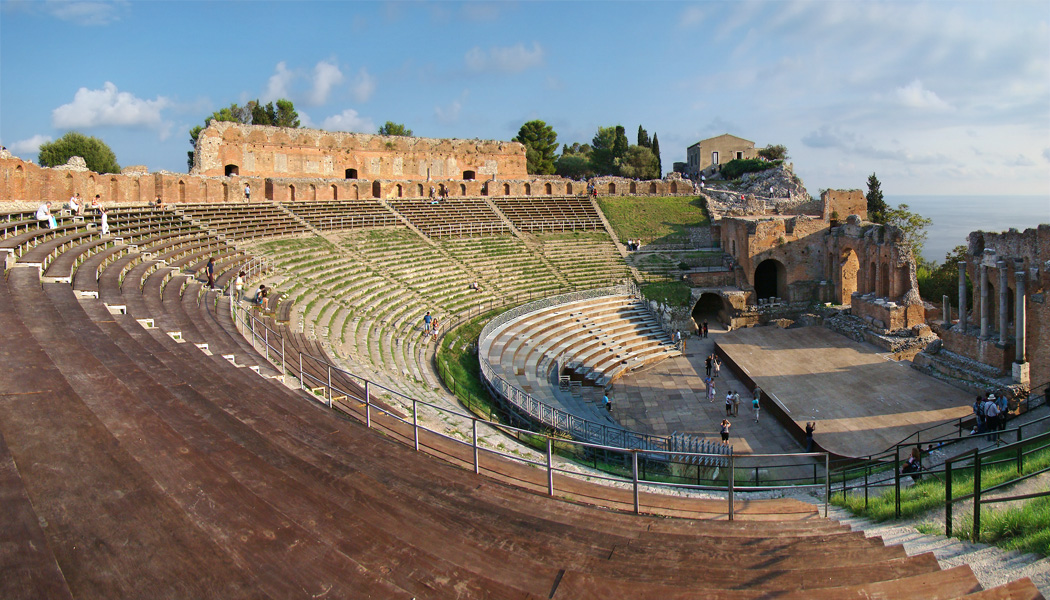
Panoramic view

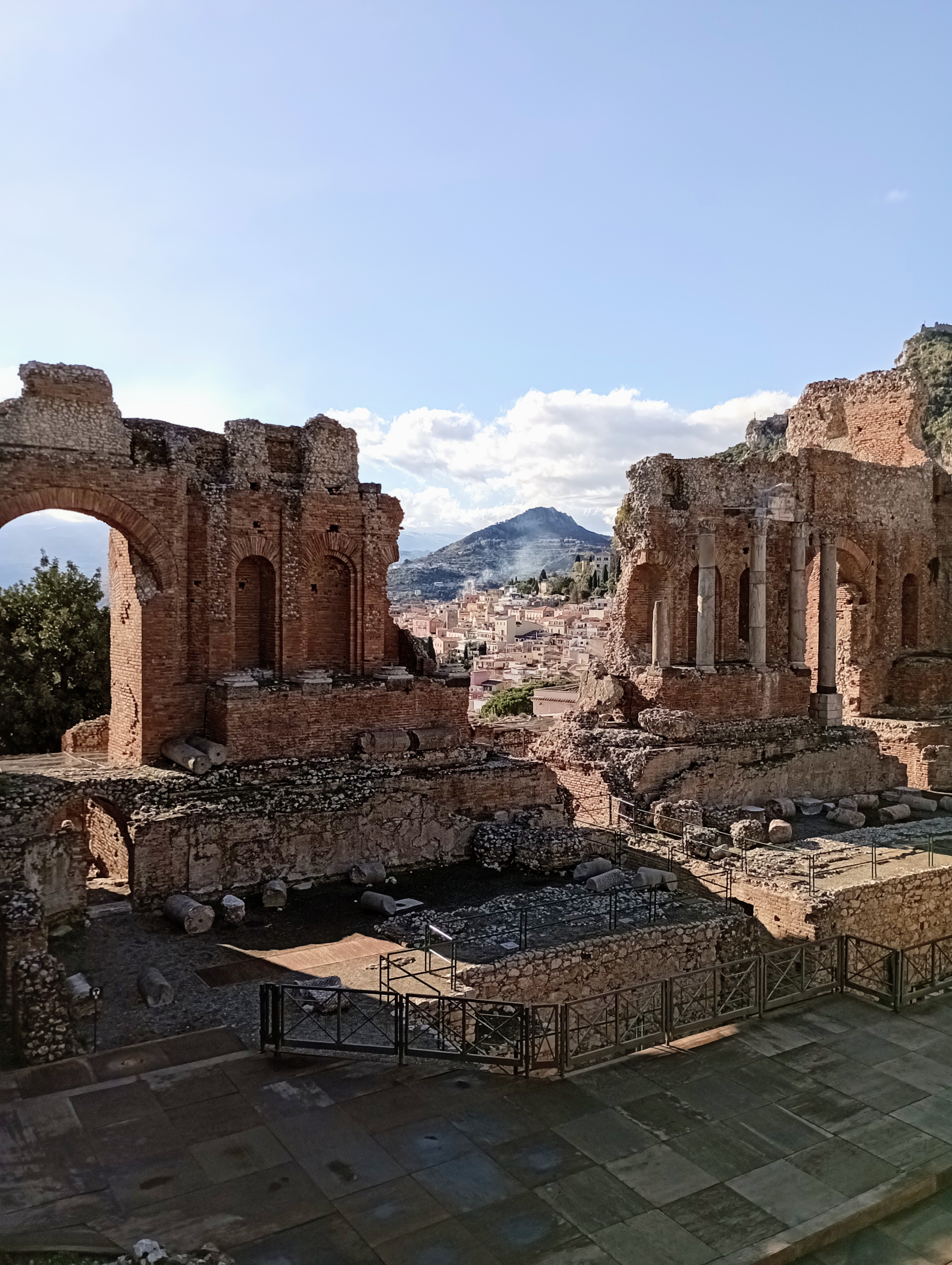
Closeup of the stage

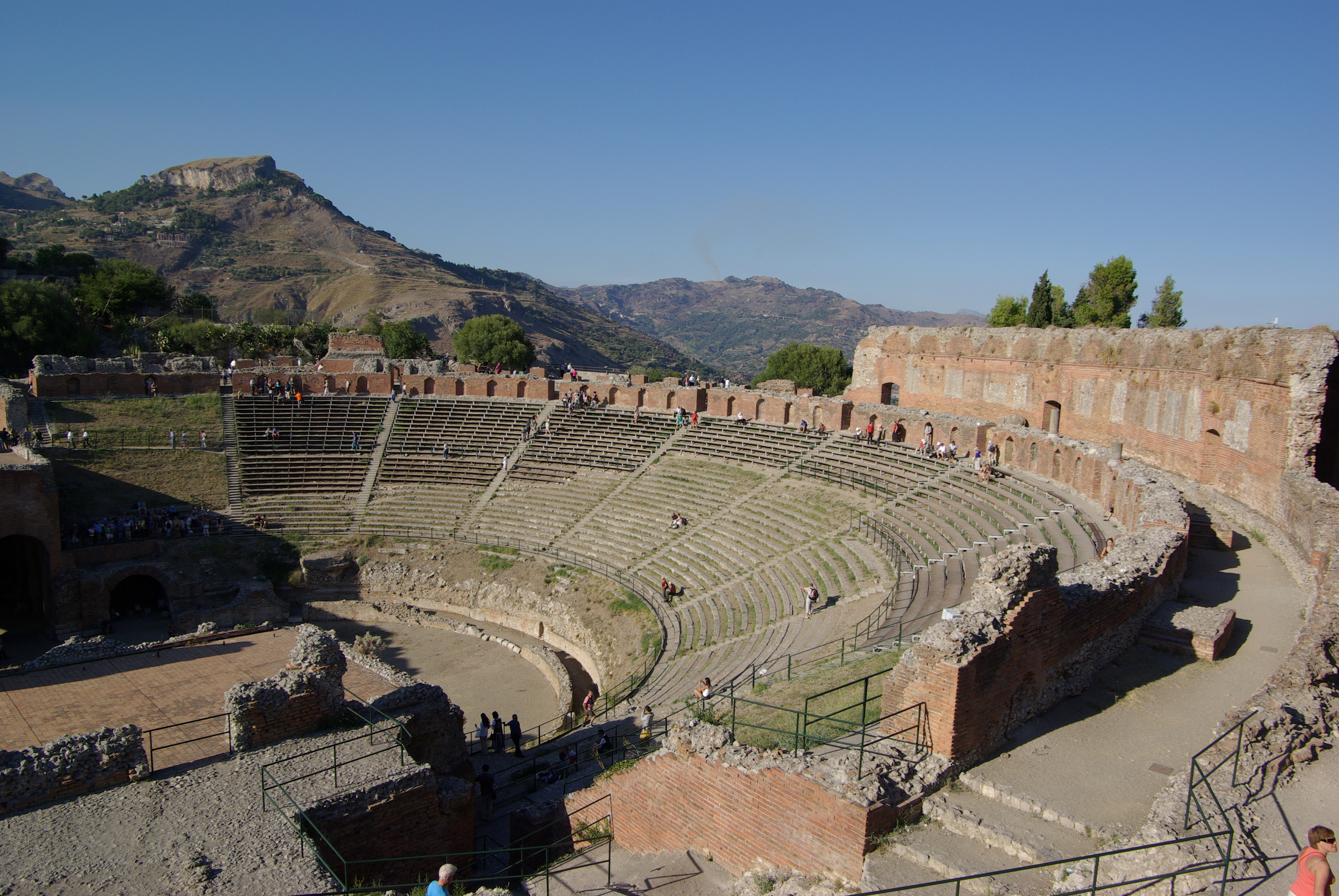
Tribunes

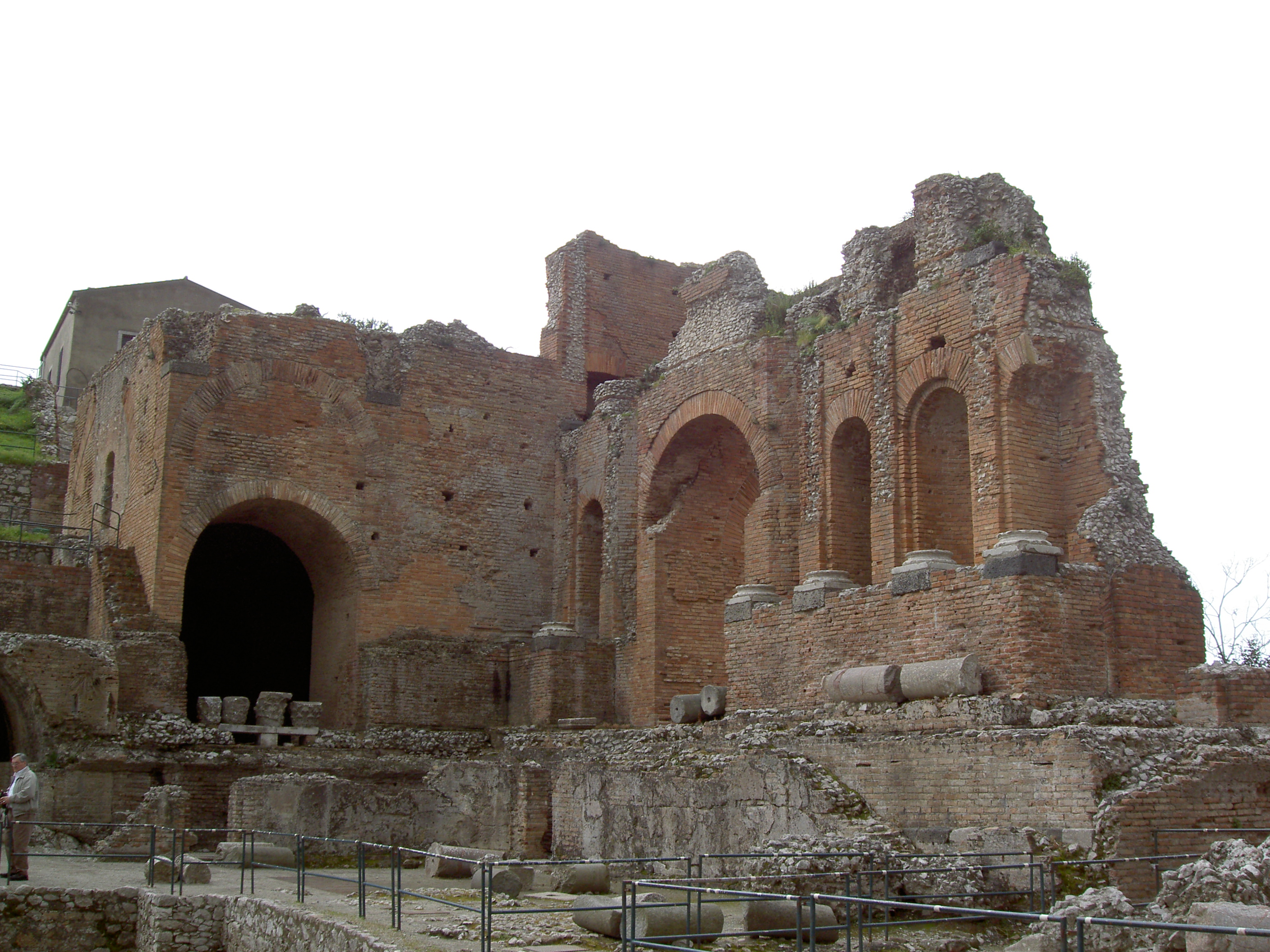
Theatre

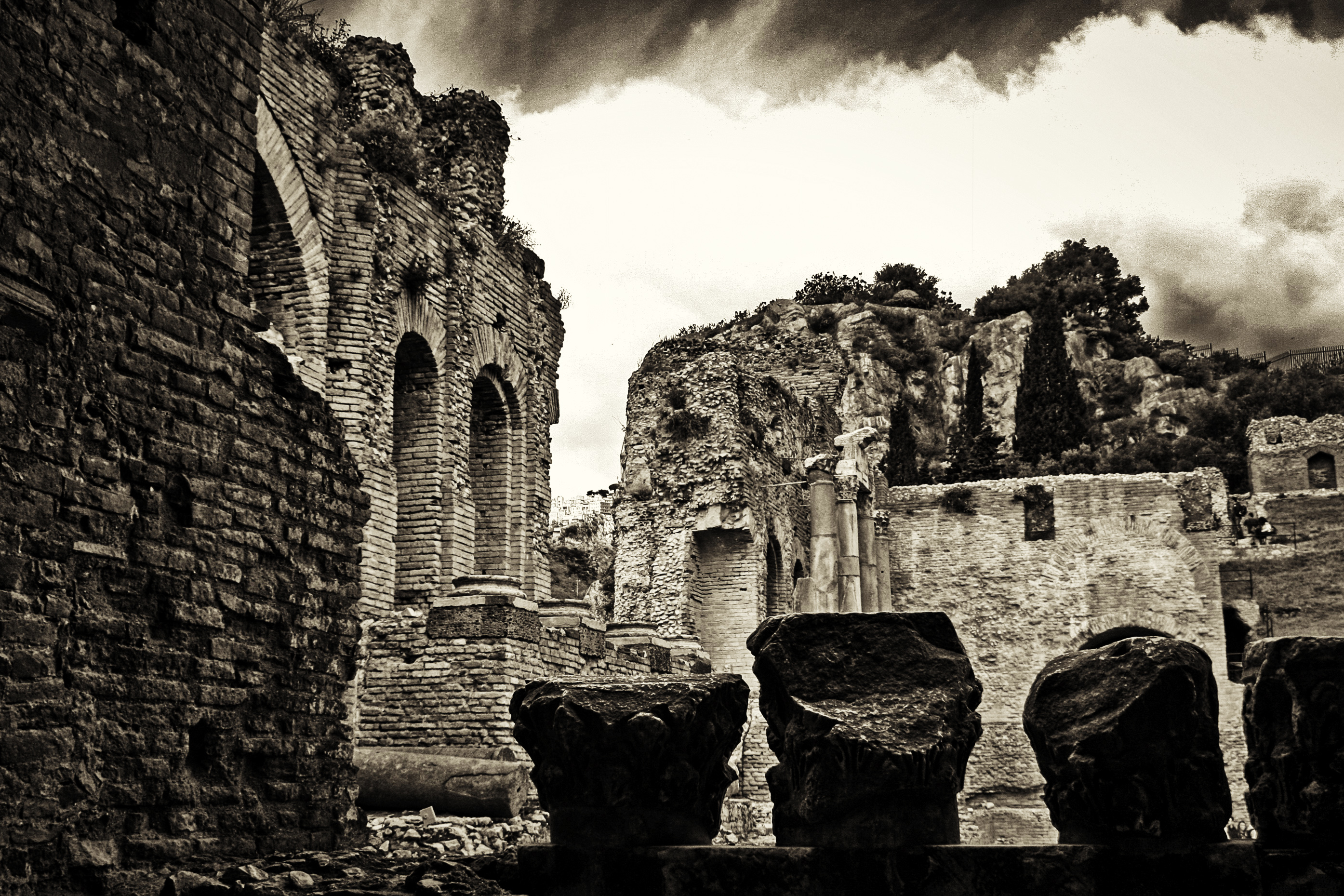
Ruins

== See also ==
- List of ancient Greek theatres
- Greek Theatre of Syracuse
- History of Taormina
