= Andromachus (ruler of Tauromenium) =

Ruler of Tauromenium

Andromachus (Ancient Greek: Ἀνδρόμαχος) was the ruler of Tauromenium (modern Taormina), Magna Graecia, in eastern Sicily in the middle of the 4th century BCE, and the father of the historian Timaeus.

== Biography ==
Tauromenium (Ταυρομένιον) had been founded ca. 396 BC by the Carthaginian general Himilco. In 392, Dionysius of Syracuse captured Tauromenium and refounded it as a Greek city.

In 358 BC, Andromachus gathered a troop of Naxian refugees who had been expelled from their homes by Dionysius, and they took the city back. His son, Timaeus, was born ca. 356 or 350. Andromachus is said to have maintained control at Tauromenium through moderate rule.

In 344, he assisted Timoleon in his expedition against Dionysius (Diod. xvi. 7, 68; Plut. Timol. 10). He remained in power at Tauromenium after Timoleon liberated Sicily.

== Bibliography ==
- Champion, Craige B. (2012). "Timaeus of Tauromenium". In Bagnall, Roger S; Brodersen, Kai; Champion, Craige B; Erskine, Andrew (eds.). The Encyclopedia of Ancient History. John Wiley & Sons. doi:10.1002/9781444338386.wbeah08159. ISBN 978-1-4443-3838-6.
- Woodhead, Arthur Geoffrey; Wilson, R. J. A. (2016). "Tauromenium". Oxford Research Encyclopedia of Classics. doi:10.1093/acrefore/9780199381135.013.6244. ISBN 978-0-19-938113-5.

== See also ==
- History of Taormina
