= Giovanni Crupi =

Italian photographer

Giovanni Crupi (1861–1925) was an Italian photographer of landscapes, active in Taormina and Egypt (in Heliopolis).

== Biography ==
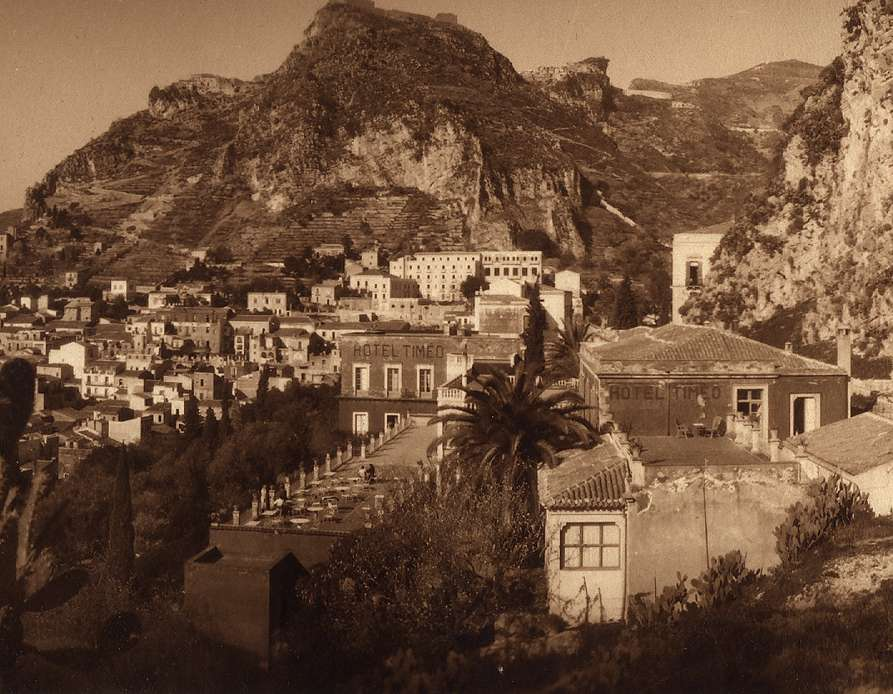
Taormina vista dall'Hotel Timeo

Giovanni Crupi was originally an amateur photographer. It became his profession in 1885.

He was a friend and colleague of Wilhelm von Gloeden. Pasquale Verdicchio in his book Looters, Photographers, and Thieves: Aspects of Italian Photographic Culture in the Nineteenth and Twentieth Centuries states that von Gloeden learned the basics of photography from Crupi, in whose studio he became an apprentice. Von Gloeden himself stated in 1898 in a memoir that he learned the rudiments of photographic art from the Giuseppe Bruno. In the field of landscape photography, the two friends and colleagues seem to have influenced one another. | small number of male nudes produced by Crupi, set in archaeological sites in Syracuse, are attributed to the influence of Gloeden.

A small number of images carry the stamp of both Gloeden and Crupi. However, these images are stylistically quite different from what Crupi produced, so it is possible that the double stamp is due to the fact that Crupi acted as Gloeden's distributor: there are photos by Gloeden that show the second stamp of Brogi or Angelo Pedo, who we know with certainty to have been a distributor for third parties. The artistic photos of Crupi are normally easily distinguishable by the presence of a thick black band at the bottom, in which is written the title of the image and the catalog number, as was customary in commercial photos of the era, in addition to the signature of Crupi.

In 1899 Crupi left Italy and opened a photographic studio in Egypt near Cairo, in Heliopolis. His studio in Teatro Greco, Taormina, did not close. It was taken over by his brother-in-law, Francesco Galifi (Taormina 1865–1951), who specialised in Sicilian landscapes, not only making his own photographs but also printing out negatives from the Crupi archive, including works by von Gloeden. These images, often extremely large in format, were sometimes printed using the outdated salted paper technique which had been popular in the period before 1860. Working with various publishing houses, many of these photographs appeared as illustrations in books and magazines. The Galifi-Crupi studio opened its main branch under the clock tower in Piazza S. Agostino, and Giovanni Crupi rejoined the enterprise on his return from Egypt in 1910 (though he no longer took photographs).

== Bibliography ==
- Mirisola, Vincenzo, and Vanzella, Giuseppe (edited by), Sicily mythical Arcadia. Von Gloeden and the "School" of Taormina, Edizioni people of photography, Palermo 2004, pp. 21–25.
- Pohlmann, Ulrich, Wilhelm von Gloeden – Sehnsucht nach Arkadien, Nishen, Berlin 1987.

== Collections ==
Works of Giovanni Crupi are in several public and private collections, including Royal Academy of Arts, Getty Museum
