= Tyndarion (tyrant) =

Tyndarion (Greek: Τυνδαρίων) was a tyrant of Tauromenium (modern Taormina), Magna Graecia, in Sicily, who invited Pyrrhus over from Italy in 278 BCE. Pyrrhus directed his course first to Tauromenium, and received reinforcements from Tyndarion. (Diod. Ecl. viii. p. 495; comp. Plut. Pyrrh. 23; Droysen, Geschichte des Hellenismus, vol. ii. p. 150)

== See also ==
- History of Taormina
