= Giuseppe Bruno (mathematician) =

Italian mathematician (1828–1893)

- Born: 21 June 1828; Mondovì, Kingdom of Sardinia; now Italy
- Died: 4 February 1893 (aged 64); Turin, Italy
- Education: University of Turin
- Scientific career
- Fields: Mathematics
- Workplaces: University of Turin
- Notable students: Giuseppe Peano; Corrado Segre

Giuseppe Bruno (1828–1893) was an Italian mathematician, professor of geometry in the University of Turin.

== Life and work ==
Bruno has born in a very poor family, but he won a stipend to study in the University of Turin, where he graduated in philosophy in 1846. The following years he was professor at secondary level, while he studied to graduate in engineering (1850) and to doctorate in mathematics (1851).

In 1852 he was appointed substitute professor of mathematics in the university of Turin; he combined this work with his private and public teaching in lower levels. In 1862 he was appointed professor of geometry in the university; in 1881 he became president of the Sciences Faculty.

Bruno wrote twenty one-papers, all but two in geometry, but he is mostly known by his teaching. Among his students are Giuseppe Peano and Corrado Segre.

== Bibliography ==
- Giacardi, Livia; Luciano, Erika; Pizzrelli, Chiara; Roero, Clara Silvia (2015). "Gli Archivi di Corrado Segre presso l'Università di Torino" (PDF). Rivista di Storia dell'Università di Torino (in Italian). 4 (2): 49–57. doi:10.13135/2281-2164/1688. ISSN 2281-2164.
- Marchisotto, Elena Anne; Smith, James T. (2007). The Legacy of Mario Pieri in Geometry and Arithmetic. Birkhäuser. ISBN 978-0-8176-3210-6.
- Segre, Corrado (1893–94). "Giuseppe Bruno. (Cenni biografici)". Annuario R. Univ. Torino (in Italian): 428–437.
