= Giuseppe Bruno (photographer) =

Italian photographer (1836–1904)

Giuseppe Bruno (1836 in Capizzi – 1904 in Taormina) was an Italian photographer who worked in Taormina, Capizzi and Sicily in the 19th century.

== Biography ==
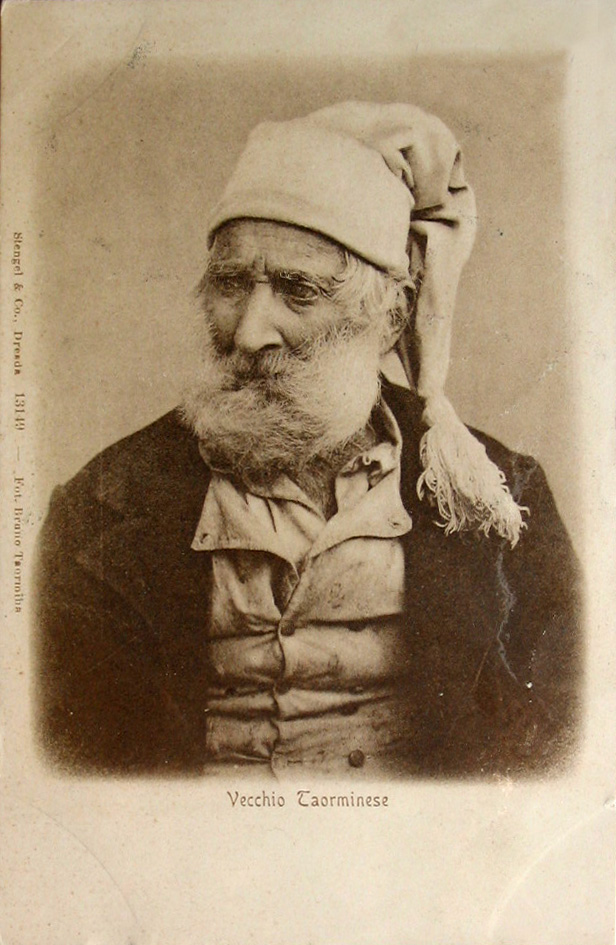
Old man in Taormina

He was educated as an engineer and he married a rich woman. Living on her income he could dedicate himself to his passion: photography. At the time this was a relatively new form of art, which required technical skills. He was keen on experimenting with new techniques of impression and printing of images. He even defined himself a "chemist-photographer".

He was teacher to Wilhelm von Gloeden, to whom he passed the passion for experimenting with the techniques of impression and printing of images.

His production was mainly dedicated to landscapes and monuments of the local areas with the successful introduction of human figures in the sceneries.
