= Korora, New South Wales =

Korora
- Suburb
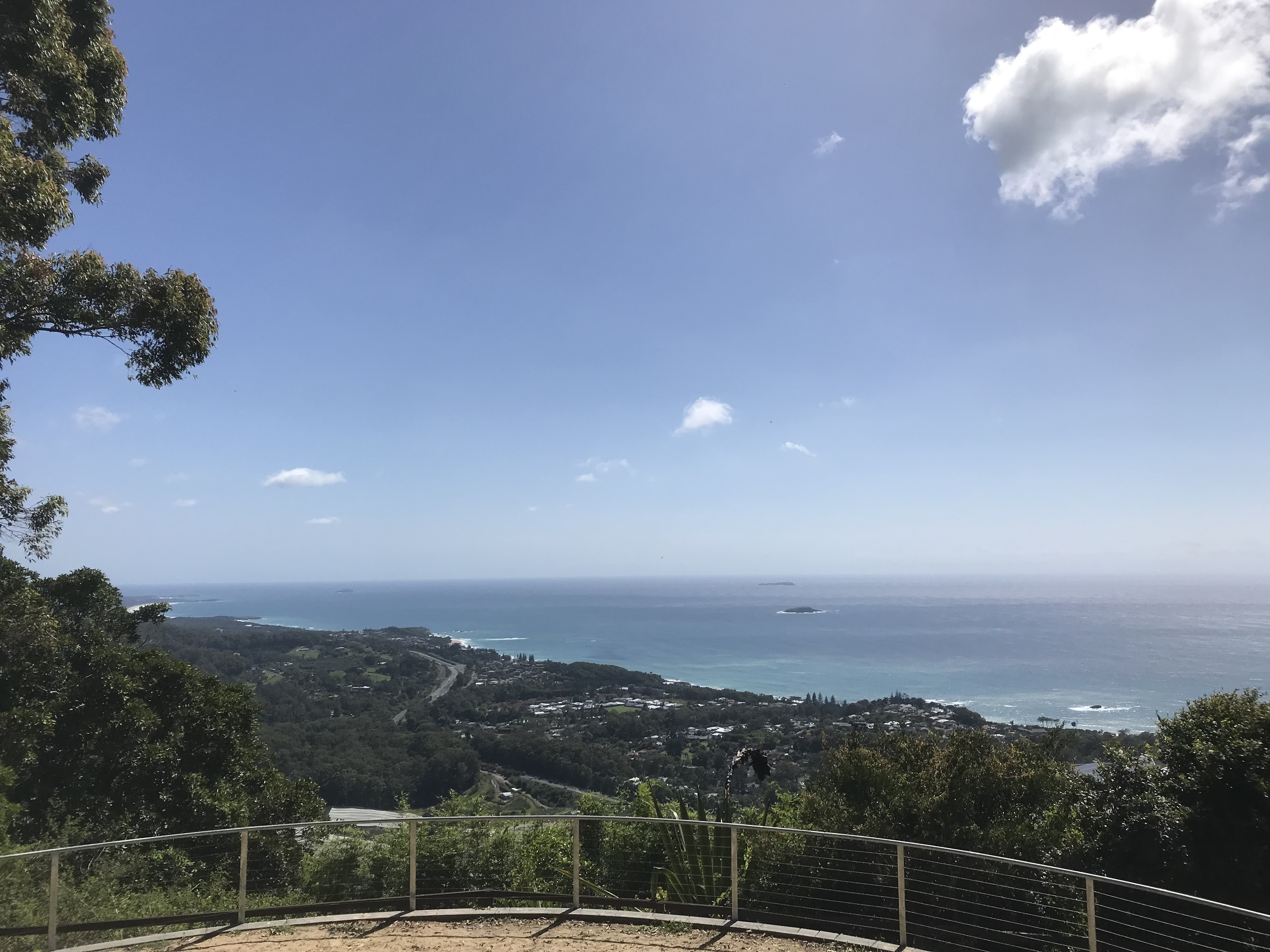
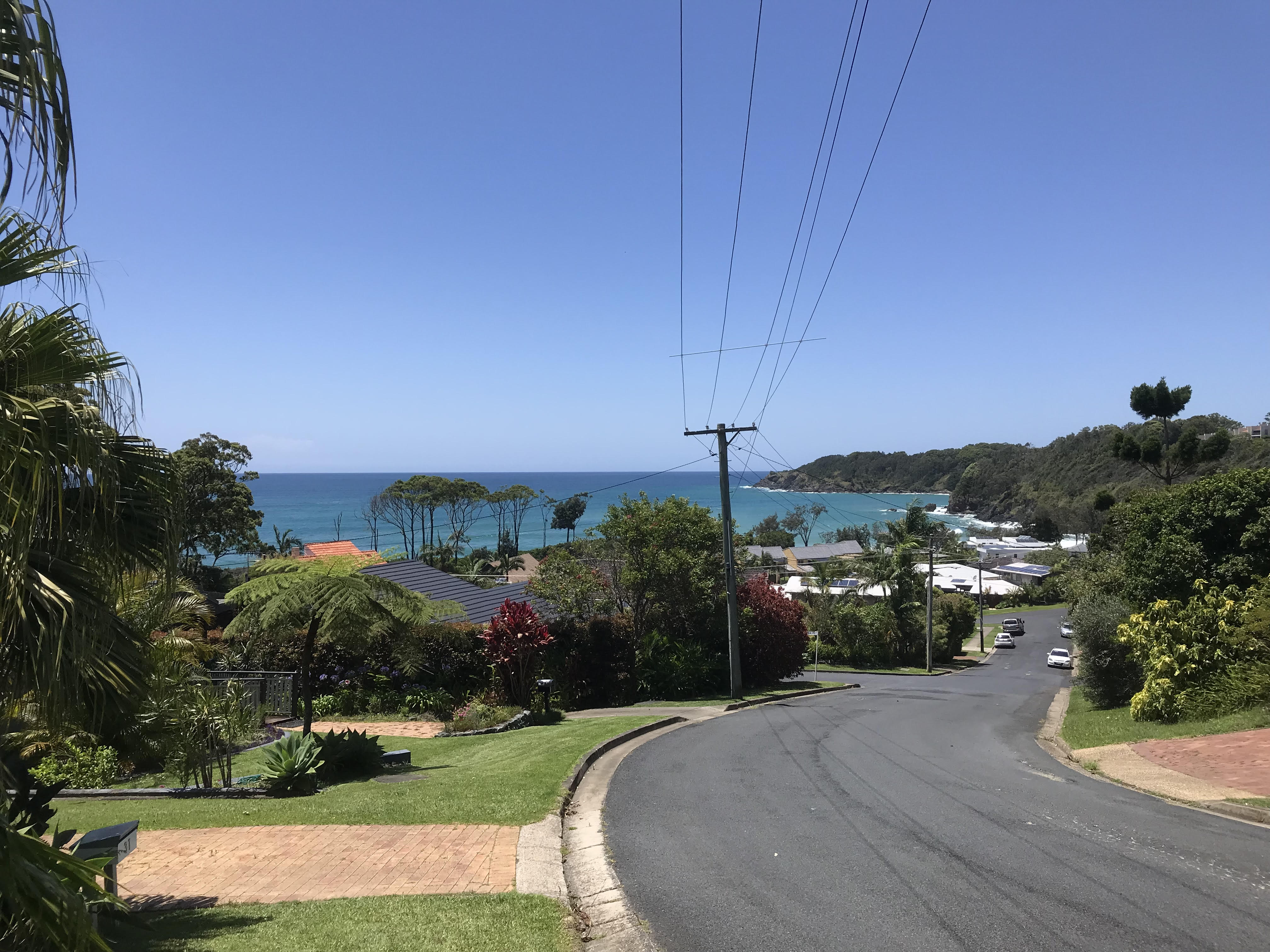
- View of Korora from Korora Lookout Korora residential area looking towards Korora Beach

- Coordinates: 30°24′S 153°01′E
- Country: Australia
- State: New South Wales
- City: Coffs Harbour
- LGA(s): City of Coffs Harbour
- Location: 532 km (331 mi) NNE of Sydney; 381 km (237 mi) S of Brisbane; 6 km (3.7 mi) N of Coffs Harbour

Government
  - State electorate(s): Coffs Harbour
  - Federal division(s): Page

Population
  - Total(s): 2,740 (2021 census)
- Postcode: 2450

Korora is a suburb of the City of Coffs Harbour in New South Wales, Australia, located 6 km north of the city centre. Korora is located in a basin that runs from the foothills of the Great Dividing Range in the west to Korora Bay (part of the Tasman Sea) in the east. It is bisected by the Pacific Highway, which runs south to north between Sydney and Brisbane. The section of Korora between the Pacific Highway and the coast is mainly residential, with some tourist facilities. The section west of the Highway consists of larger residential blocks and farms growing mainly bananas and blueberries. The west-most section of Korora is forested and includes part of the Ulidarra National Park. The Korora basin is drained by creeks that flow into Pine Brush Creek and enter the sea at Hills Beach.

The name Korora stems from an Aboriginal word ‘Kurrawa’ which has been variously interpreted to mean “rough sea or seas”, “sound of the waves” or “roar of the seas”. The variant spelling ‘Kororo’ is found in some place names (Kororo Public School, Kororo Reserve), but is thought to be due to a spelling error in an early handwritten document.

== History ==
Korora is part of the land traditionally occupied by the Gumbaynggirr Aboriginal people. It is recorded that at the time of European settlement, Aborigines camped near the present site of the Kororo Public School, because there was a source of fresh water in Pine Brush Creek and it was close to the coast which provided abundant fresh food. It is also recorded that the area was of mythological significance, with Korora Bay being a black goanna increase site associated with a large rock in the bay. Introduced diseases, such as measles and whooping cough, had a devastating effect on the Aboriginal population.

The first European settler was a squatter, James Small, who arrived with his family and some teamsters in 1880. They cut cedar and pine for timber around Pine Brush Creek, which they hauled to the sea shore for shipment to Sydney. When the supply of timber declined, Small began growing and milling sugarcane. He established a steam powered mill, but there were difficulties in transporting the sugar out. As a squatter, Small became concerned that he would lose use of the land to others who had legal title, so he left the area for Kempsey around 1888. Sugar growing finished in 1900/01 when the Australian government ended a bounty paid to sugar growers.

A primary school, the Kororo Public School, was first opened in 1893 and continues to the present day.

A German selector, Hermann Rieck, acquired land in the area in 1881 and lived there until 1913. He had a private income from his family’s publishing business in Germany and could afford to experiment with various crops. He was the first to grow bananas in the district. Banana farming was slowly adopted by others, including the Jordan family in 1911. Following World War I, land in West Korora was set aside for settlement by former soldiers, who also took up banana growing. In 1922, banana farms in other areas of New South Wales and in Queensland were affected by the disease bunchy-top, which boosted demand for healthy fruit and suckers from the Korora region.

Mr and Mrs Norman Hill settled on a farm in Korora in 1923. They established a golf course on the property for use by the Coffs Harbour Golf Club. The course continued on the Hill’s farm until 1938, when the club secured a permanent site elsewhere. The Hill family established the Banana Bowl tourist park at Hills Beach in 1960. This included caravan and camping sites, a shop, a natural swimming pool and 100 acres of banana plantation for walks.

From the 1950s, farmland owned by various families in Korora began to be subdivided for residential blocks. The Hill family subdivided some of their farmland for home sites in 1964. The site of the Banana Bowl tourist park was sold by the Hill family in 1983 and the land was subsequently developed for the Opal Cove Resort c. 1989.

== Demographics ==
In the 2021 Australian census, Korora had a population of 2,740. Compared with Australia as a whole, Korora had an older population (median age of 44 vs 38 years), with more people born in Australia (77.8% vs 66.9%) and speaking English only at home (88.9% vs 72.0%). Korora also had a higher median weekly personal income ($832 vs $805) and level of education (28.7% vs 26.3% with a Bachelor degree or higher).

== Beaches ==
There are two beaches in Korora, the 650m long Korora Beach in the south and the 600m long Hills Beach in the north, which are separated from each other by a rock platform. Pinebrush Creek creates a lagoon at the northern end of Hills Beach, which is periodically open to the sea. Both beaches are unpatrolled and rated as moderately hazardous (4/10) for swimming. Dogs are allowed on leash on both beaches. Hills Beach Reserve is a public park at the south end of Hills Beach, with children’s playground, picnic shelters, BBQ facilities, toilets and showers.

The sea off Korora Bay is part of the Solitary Islands Marine Park and the beaches are designated as Habitat Protection Zones. Recreational line fishing is allowed.

Completion of the Coffs Harbour breakwaters in 1946 interrupted the natural northerly transport of sand to beaches north of the harbour, including Korora Beach and Hills Beach. Korora Beach was sandmined in the 1950s and has experienced severe shoreline recession in the past. Both beaches are predicted to experience future recession, estimated at -0.4 metres/ year for Korora Beach and -0.2 metres/year for Hills Beach.

== Tourist facilities ==
Korora has a number of facilities providing tourist accommodation. The largest is the Opal Cove Resort which is located behind the northern end of Hills Beach.

The Solitary Islands Coastal Walk which runs for 60 km from Red Rock to Sawtell, passes along Hills Beach and Korora Beach.

The eastern section of Ulidarra National Park lies in Korora. The park conserves lowland rainforest and provides habitat for a range of native animals. It has facilities for 4WD driving, mountain biking and bushwalking.

Korora Lookout has views over the Korora Basin and out to the sea. The lookout is accessed from Sealy Lookout Drive by the 400m Gumgali walking track. Along this track are sculptures, murals and signage illustrating the Aboriginal story of Gumgali, the black goanna.

== Other facilities ==
The Kororo Public School is a primary school with 635 students in 2022. Its catchment area includes Korora, Sapphire Beach, Moonee Beach and Bucca. The Coffs Harbour Montessori Preschool is also located in Korora.

Korora Oval is a football field with toilet and changeroom facilities, maintained by the City of Coffs Harbour.

The Kororo Nature Reserve is a 11 ha park west of the Pacific Highway. It was gazetted in 1967 for the protection of fauna, particularly koalas.

== Gallery ==
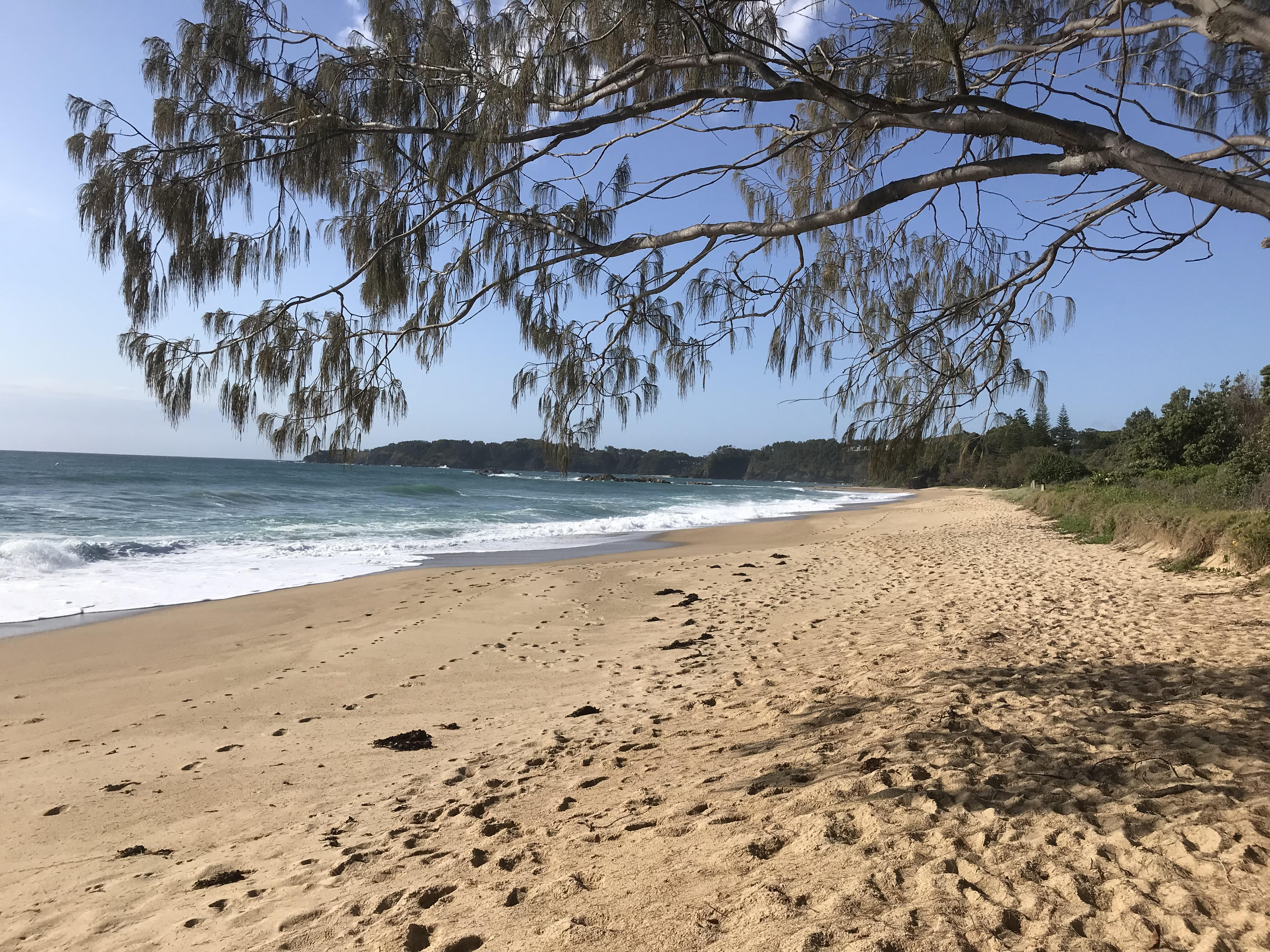
Hills Beach looking south

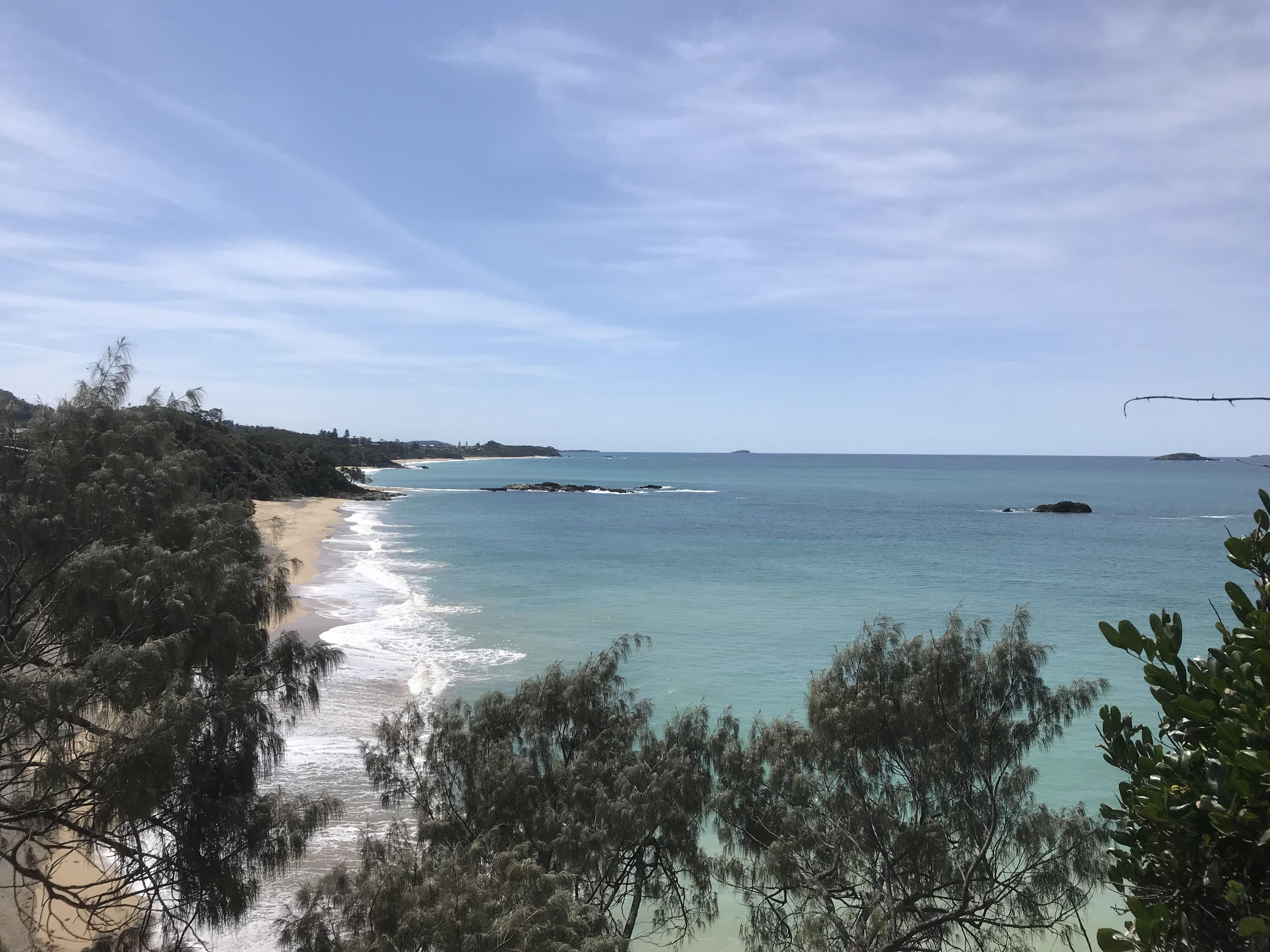
Korora Beach looking north

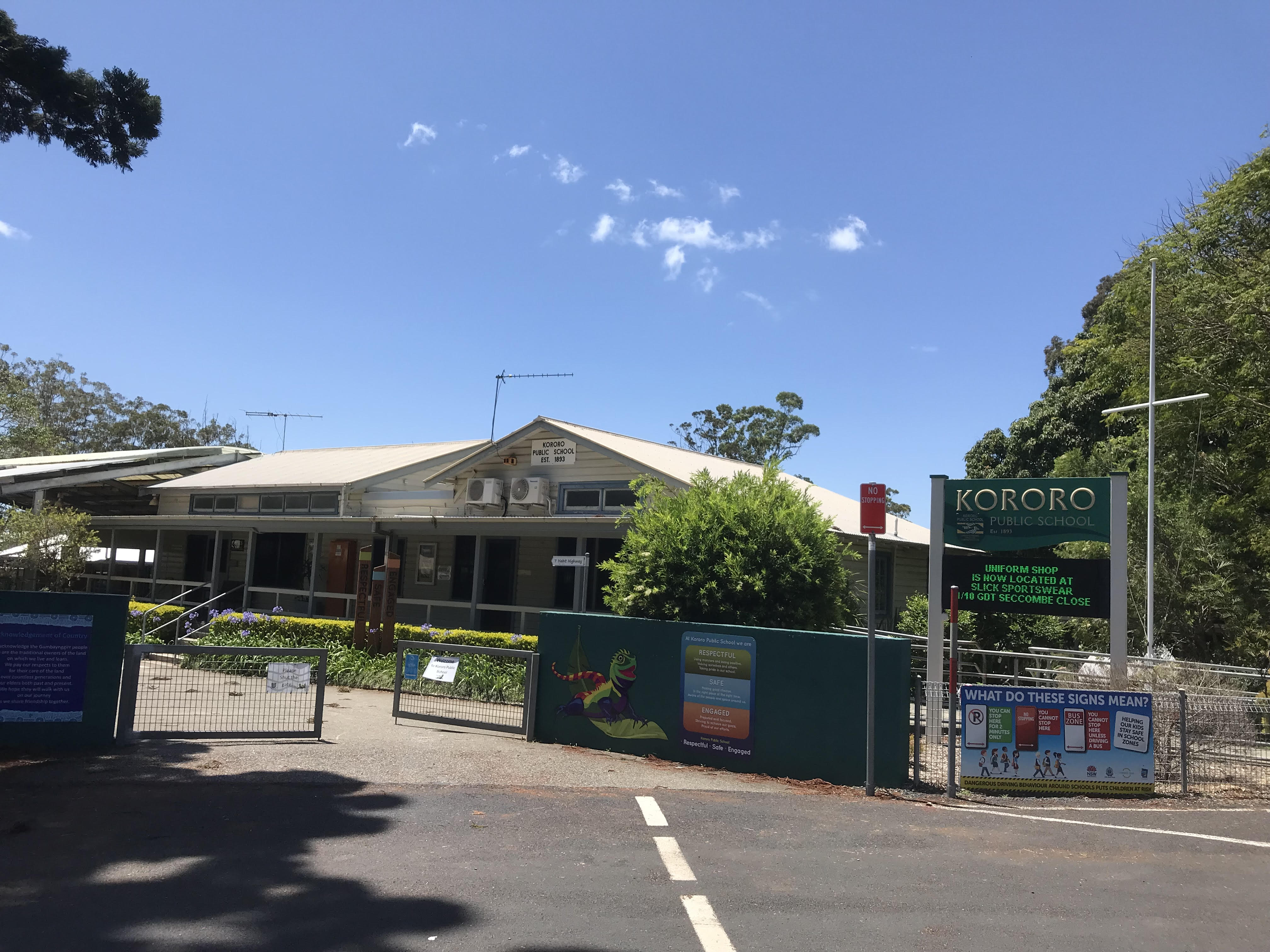
Kororo Public School

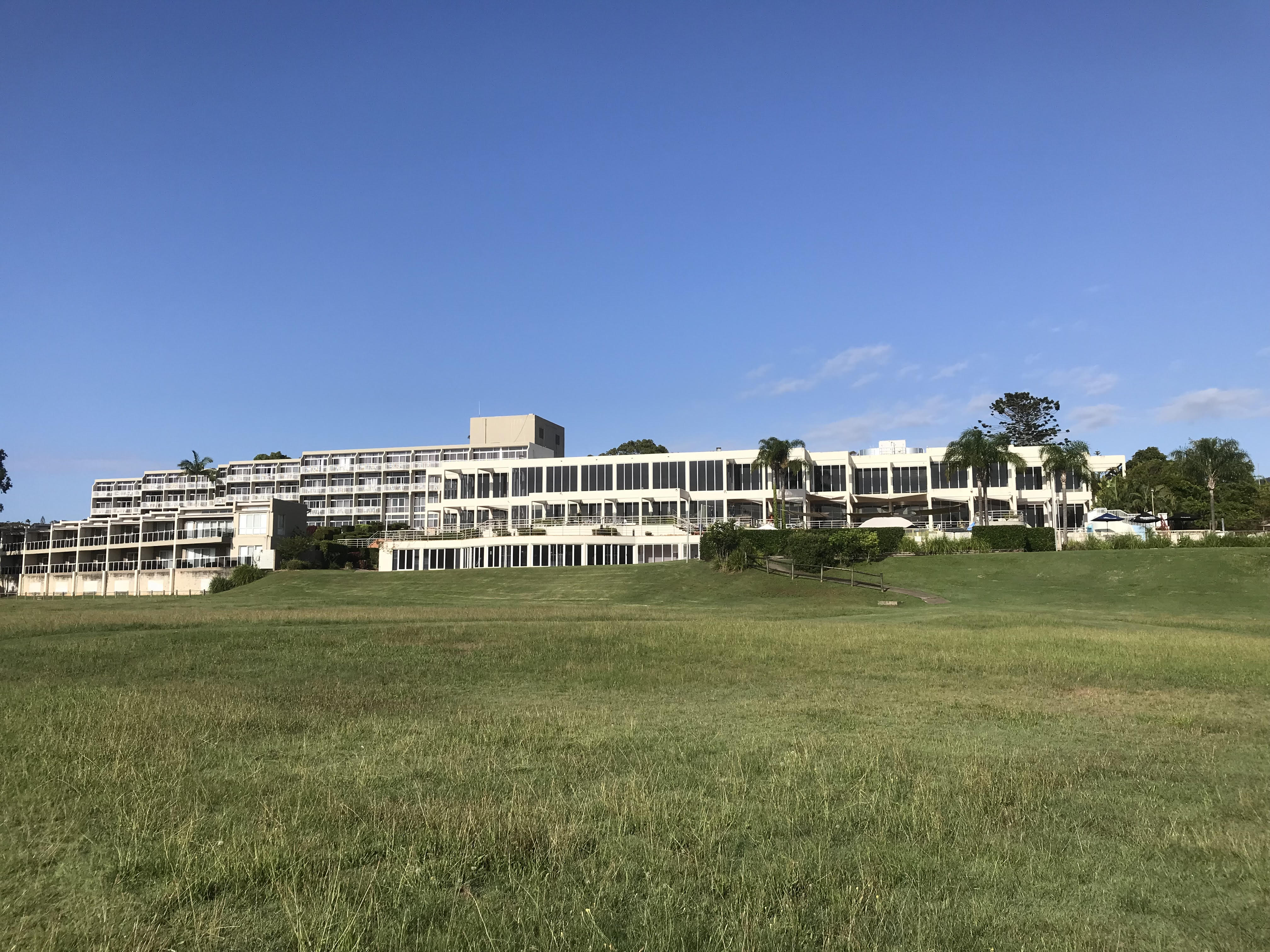
Opal Cove Resort

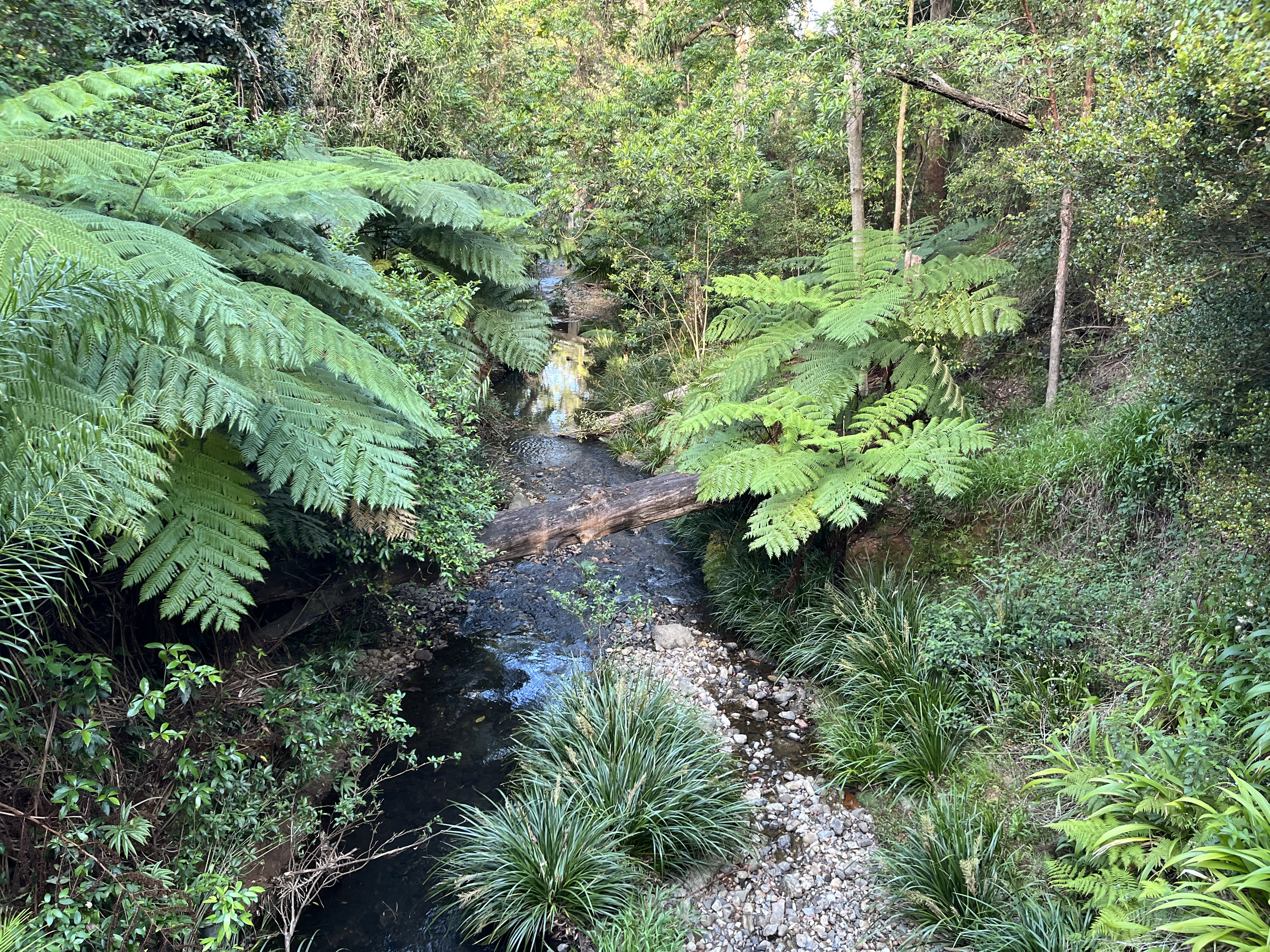
Pinebrush Creek

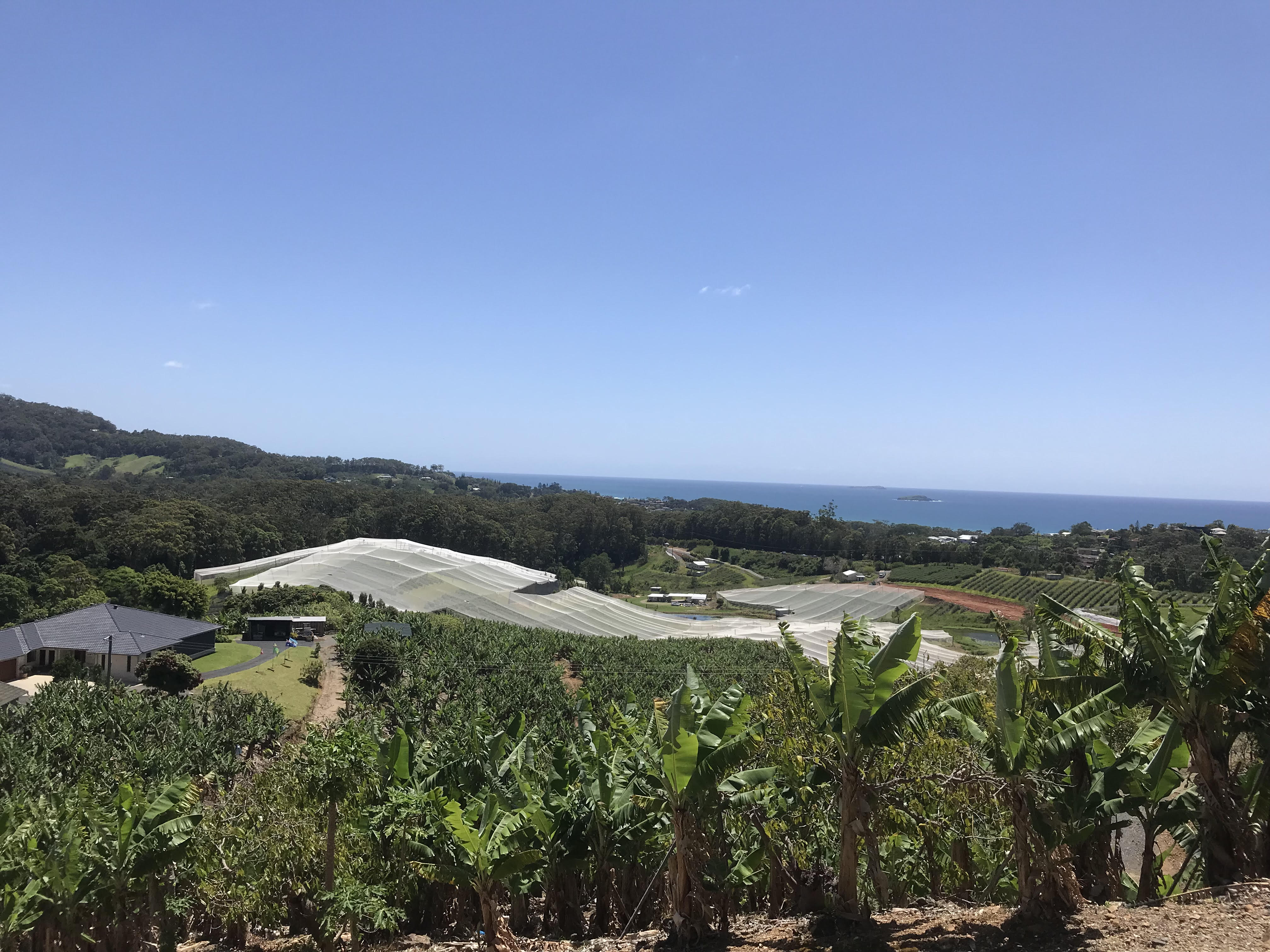
Banana and blueberry farm in West Korora

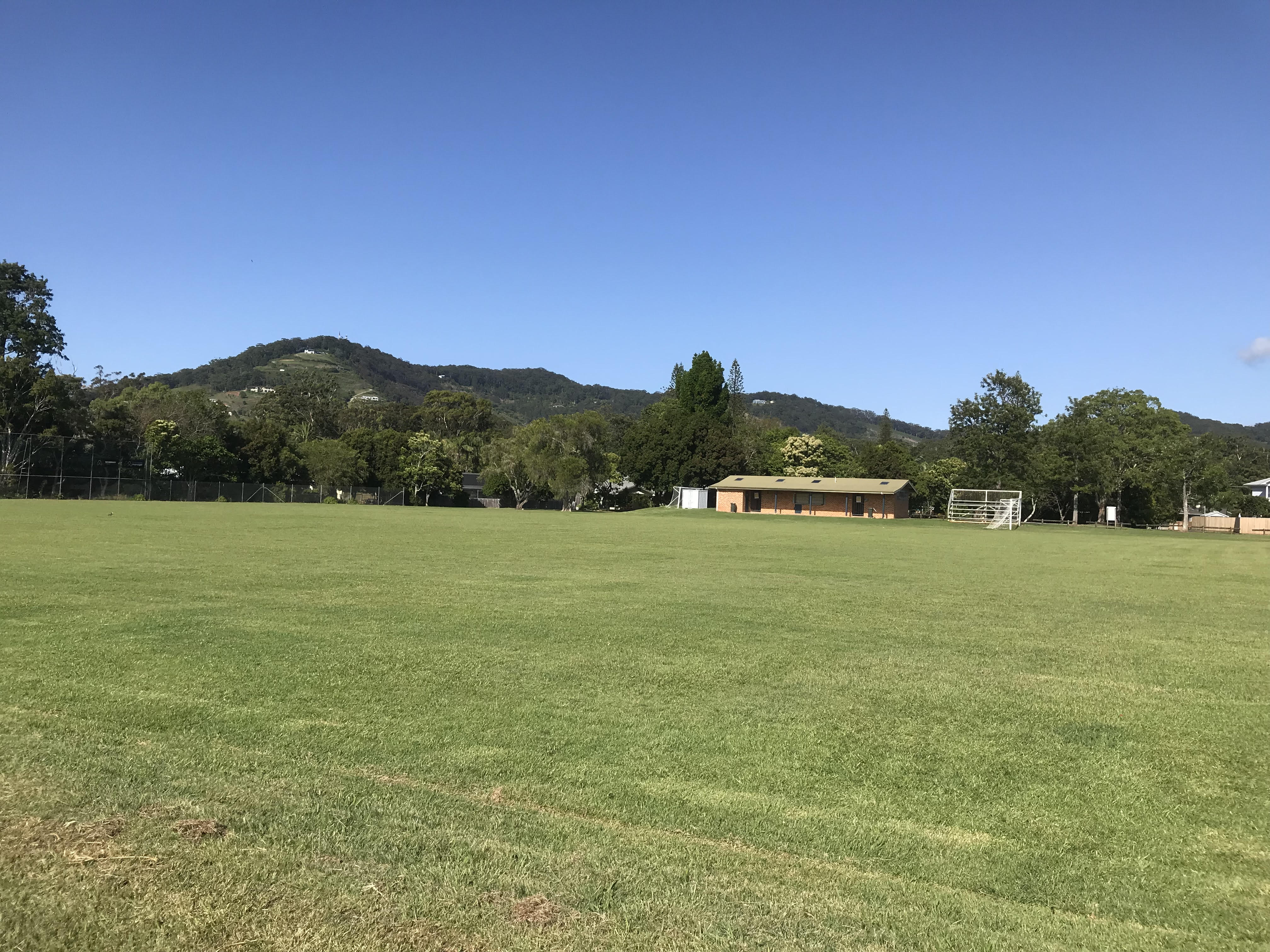
Korora Oval

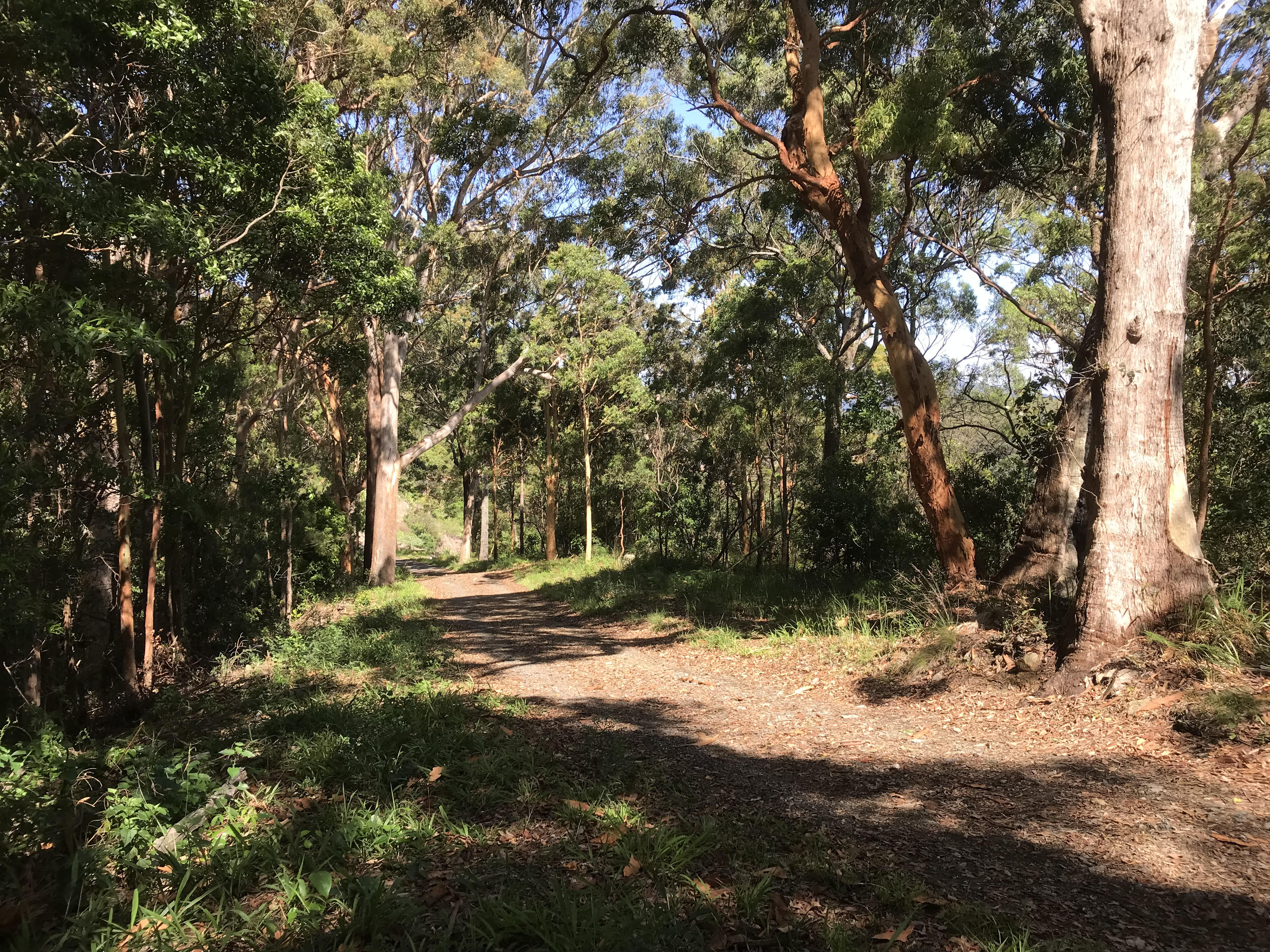
Gumgali walking track

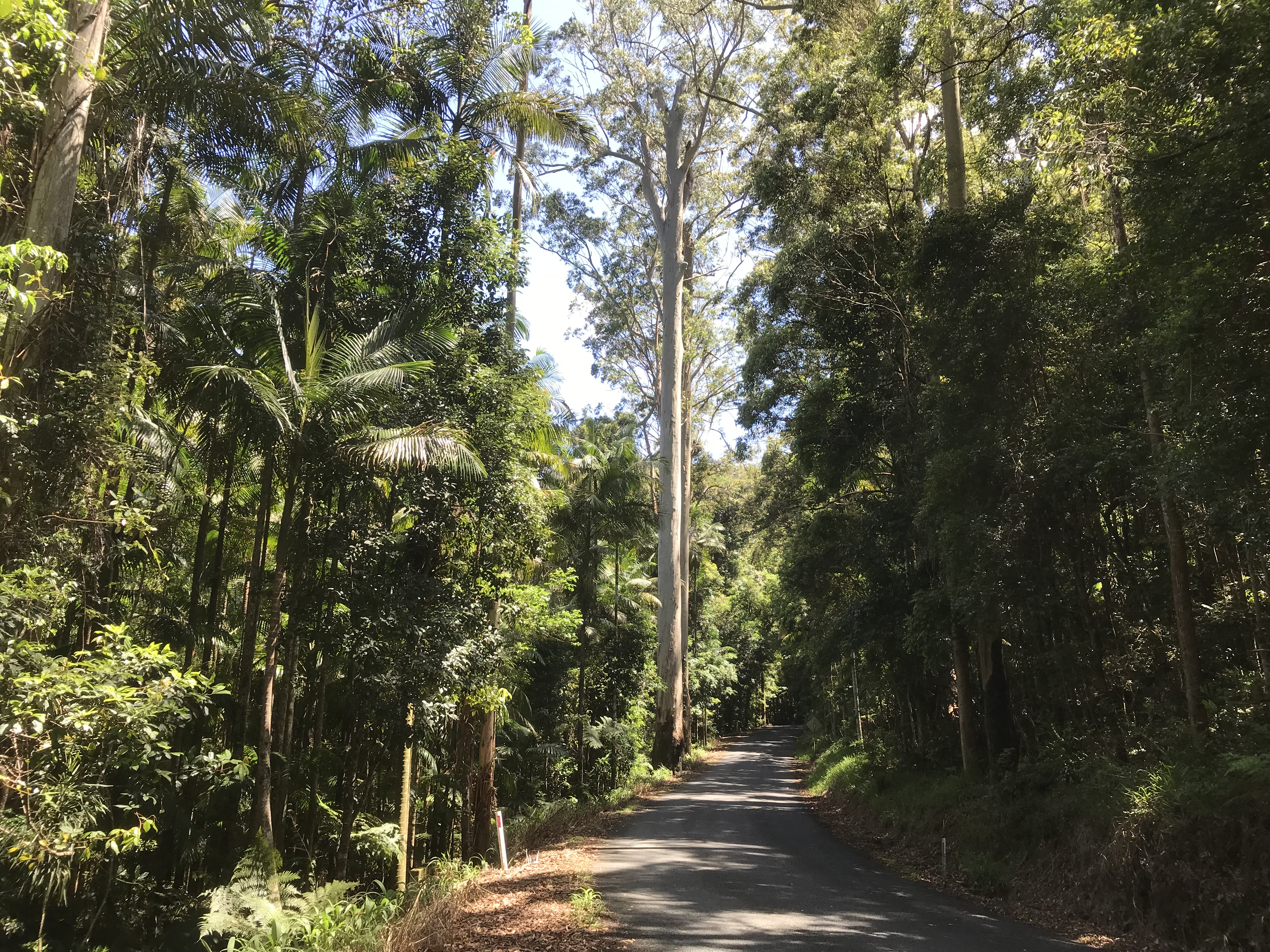
Forest in West Korora
