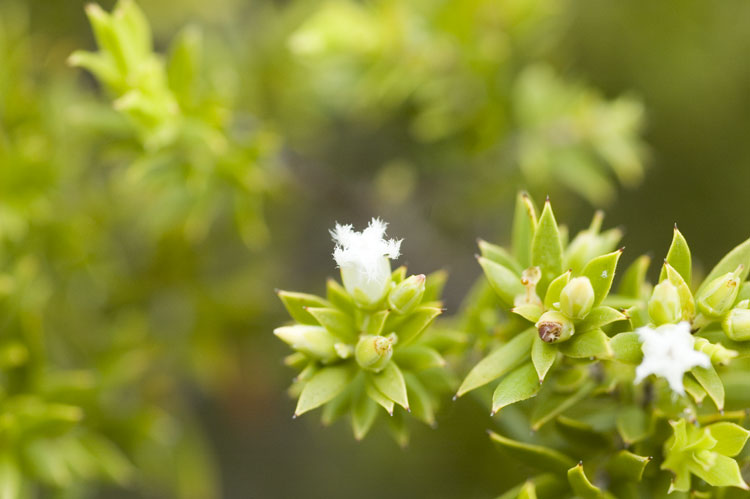
- Near Red Rock, New South Wales

Scientific classification
- Kingdom: Plantae
- Clade: Tracheophytes
- Clade: Angiosperms
- Clade: Eudicots
- Clade: Asterids
- Order: Ericales
- Family: Ericaceae
- Genus: Styphelia
- Species: S. leptospermoides

Binomial name
- Styphelia leptospermoides (R.Br.) Spreng.
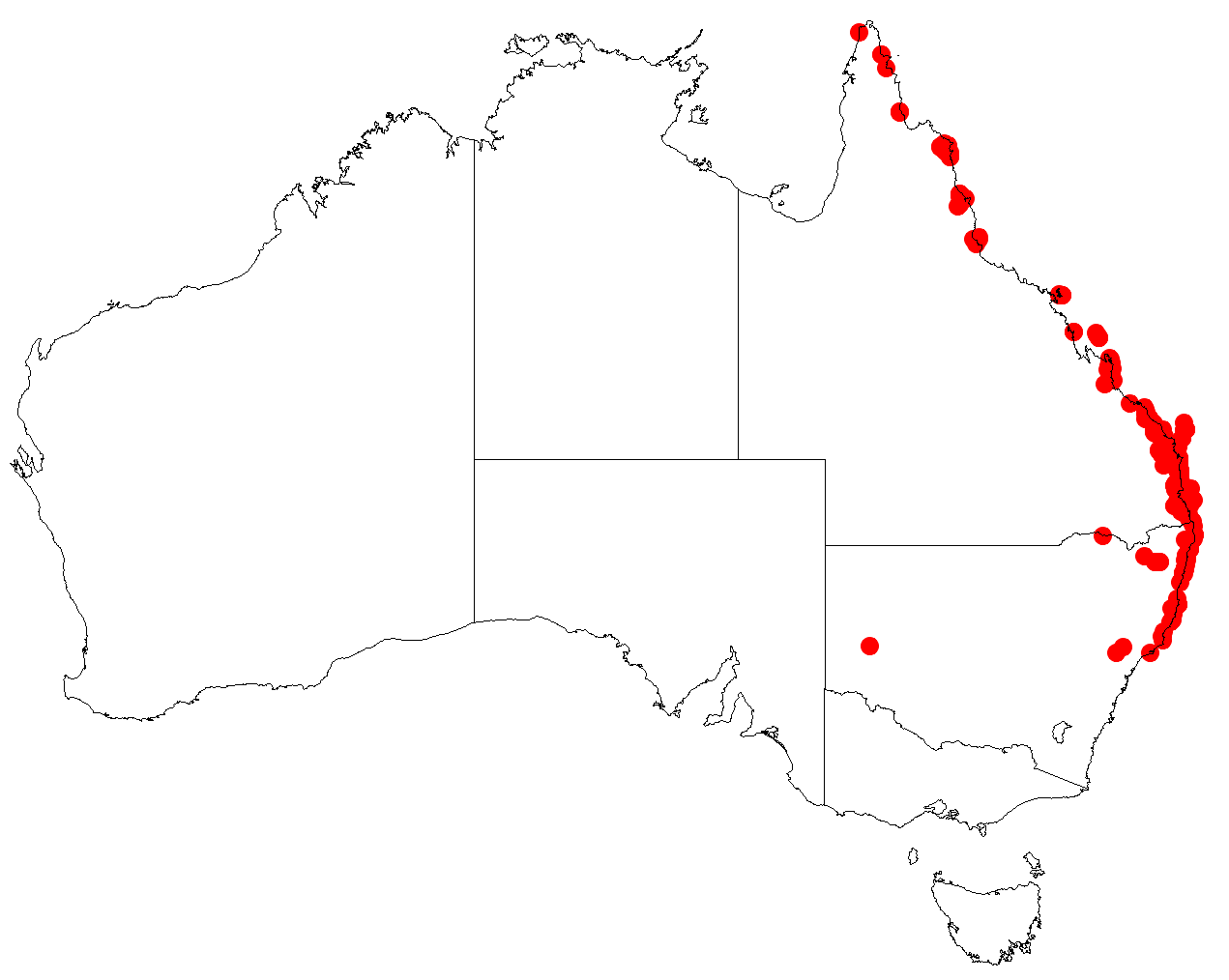
- Occurrence data from AVH

Synonyms
- Leucopogon leptospermoides R.Br.; Leucopogon pauciflorus R.Br.; Styphelia pauciflora (R.Br.) Spreng.

= Styphelia leptospermoides =

Species of shrub

Styphelia leptospermoides is a species of flowering plant in the heath family Ericaceae and is endemic to eastern Australia. It is an erect, bushy shrub with elliptic to lance-shaped or oblong leaves, and white, tube-shaped flowers usually arranged singly in upper leaf axils.

== Description ==
Styphelia leptospermoides is an erect, bushy shrub that typically grows to a height of 0.6–1 m (2 ft 0 in – 3 ft 3 in), and has softly-hairy branchlets. The leaves are more or less erect, elliptic to lance-shaped with the narrower end towards the base, or oblong, 8.5–12 mm (0.33–0.47 in) long and 1.5–2.2 mm (0.059–0.087 in) wide on a petiole 0.3–0.4 mm (0.012–0.016 in) long. The leaves are glabrous and the lower surface is finely striated. The flowers are arranged singly in upper leaf axils with white bracteoles 1.2–1.9 mm (0.047–0.075 in) long at the base. The sepals are 2.3–3.1 mm (0.091–0.122 in) long, the petals joined at the base to form a tube 1.6–2.4 mm (0.063–0.094 in) long with lobes 1.2–2.8 mm (0.047–0.110 in) long. Flowering mainly occurs from September to November and the fruit is a glabrous, oval drupe 3.3–4.0 mm (0.13–0.16 in) long.

== Taxonomy ==
This species was first formally described in 1810 by Robert Brown who gave it the name Leucopogon leptospermoides in his Prodromus Florae Novae Hollandiae et Insulae Van Diemen. In 1824, Kurt Polycarp Joachim Sprengel transferred the species to Styphelia as S. leptospermoides. The specific epithet (leptospermoides) means "leptospermum-like".

== Distribution and habitat ==
Styphelia leptospermoides grows in coastal heath and open woodland in Queensland to as far south as Hawks Nest on the north coast of New South Wales.
