= Hills Beach, New South Wales =

Hills Beach
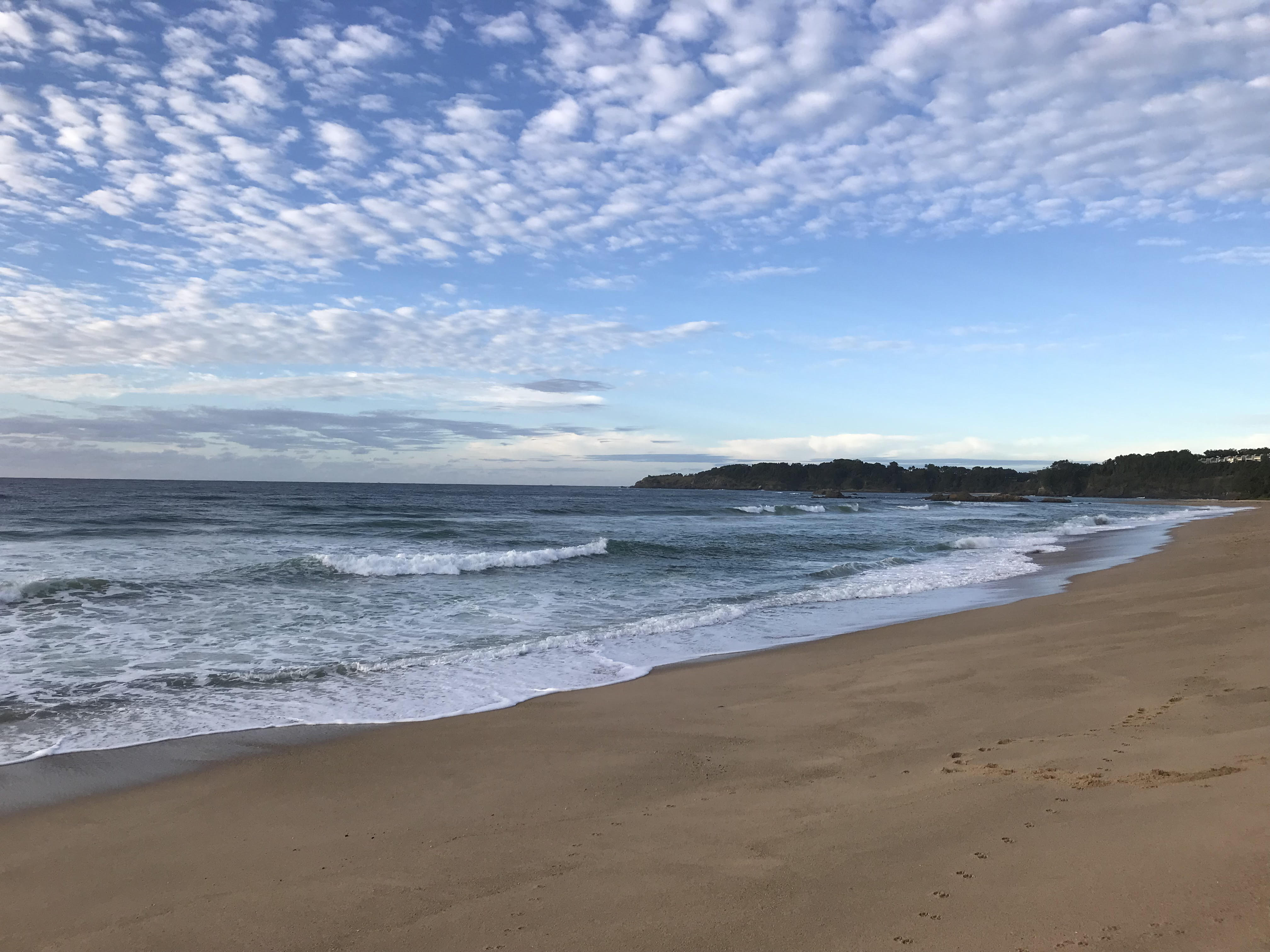
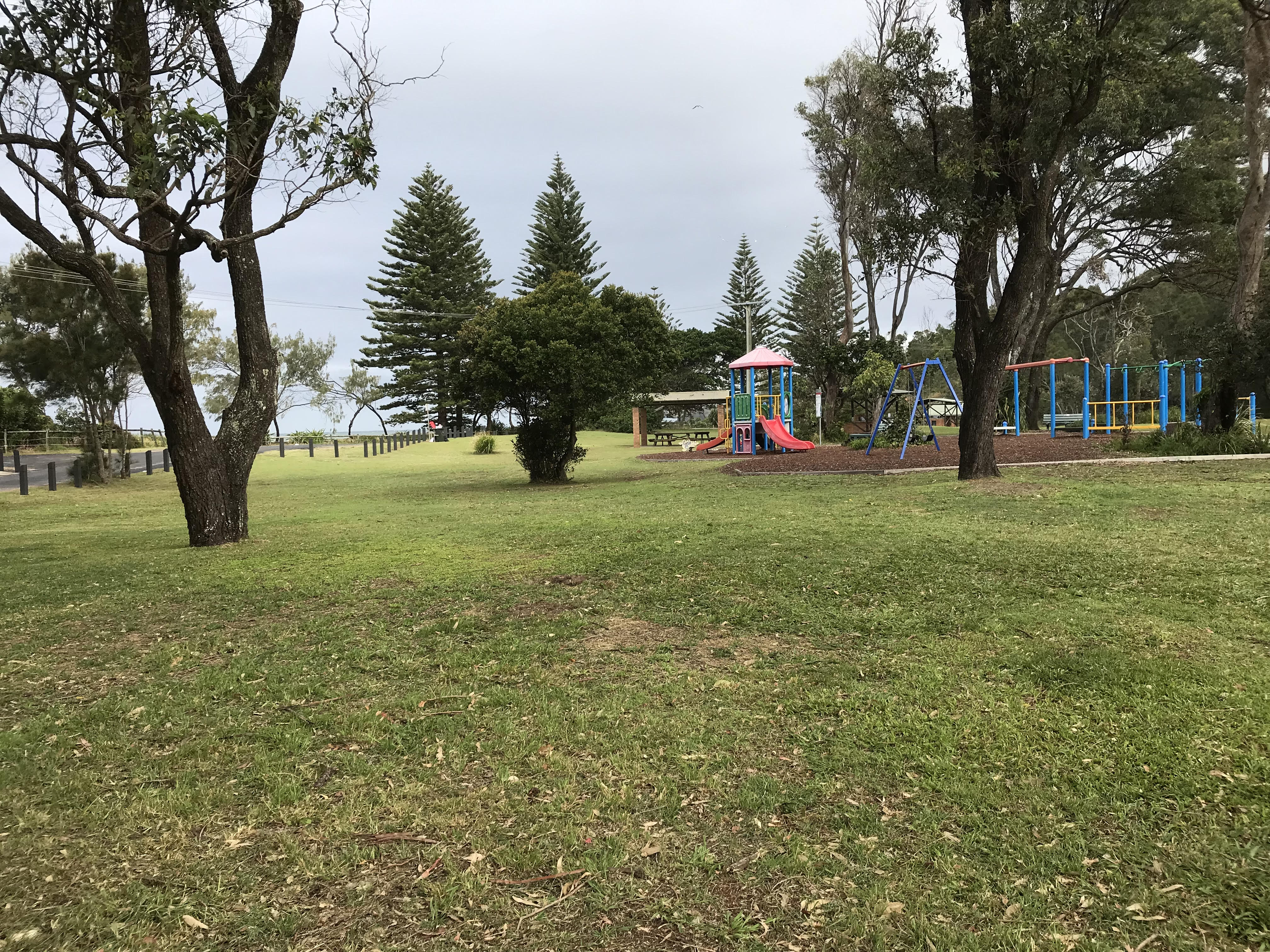
- Hills Beach looking south Hills Beach Reserve

- Coordinates: 30°15′19.62″S 153°8′23.26″E
- Country: Australia
- State: New South Wales
- Region: Mid North Coast
- LGA: City of Coffs Harbour

Hills Beach (also known as Opal Cove Beach) is a beach on Korora Bay, located in the city of Coffs Harbour, New South Wales. It is a steep, reflective beach, around 600m long. At its southern end, Hills Beach is bounded by rocks separating it from the neighbouring Korora Beach. Also near the southern end, there is a small creek crossing the beach and a sandy tombolo stretching out to rocks in the sea. At the northern end, the beach is bounded by Pine Brush Creek, which has an intermittently open entrance to the sea, and by steep rocks which separate it from the small (150m long) secluded Hills North Beach. The sea off the beach is part of the Solitary Islands Marine Park and is a Habitat Protection Zone. The Solitary Islands Coastal Walk, which goes from Red Rock to Sawtell (60 km), runs through Hills Beach.

== Amenities ==
Public access to the beach is available at the southern end at Hills Beach Reserve, via Norman Hill Drive. This is a park with a children’s playground, as well as barbecue, shower and toilet facilities. Behind the northern end, near Pine Brush Creek, is the Opal Cove resort, which offers tourist accommodation. The beach is not patrolled by lifeguards and is moderately hazardous for swimming. Dogs are allowed on leash on the beach. Pine Brush Creek, which crosses the northern end of the beach, has generally good water quality.

== History ==
The beach is named after the Hill family, who had a farm in the area behind the beach from 1923. In the 1920s and 1930s, the family also maintained a golf course on the property. In the 1950s, the beach was regularly used for Christmas parties organized by the Ex-Services Club, with more than 1,000 people attending. In 1956, Pine Brush Creek was approved for mineral sand mining to extract rutile, zircon and ilmenite. In 1960, the Hill family opened the Banana Bowl Caravan Park at the northern end of the beach, which was surrounded by banana trees. The park offered caravan and camping facilities, with swimming and canoeing available in Pine Brush Creek. The caravan park was sold by the Hill family in 1983 and the land was subsequently developed for the Opal Cove Resort c. 1989.

== Gallery ==
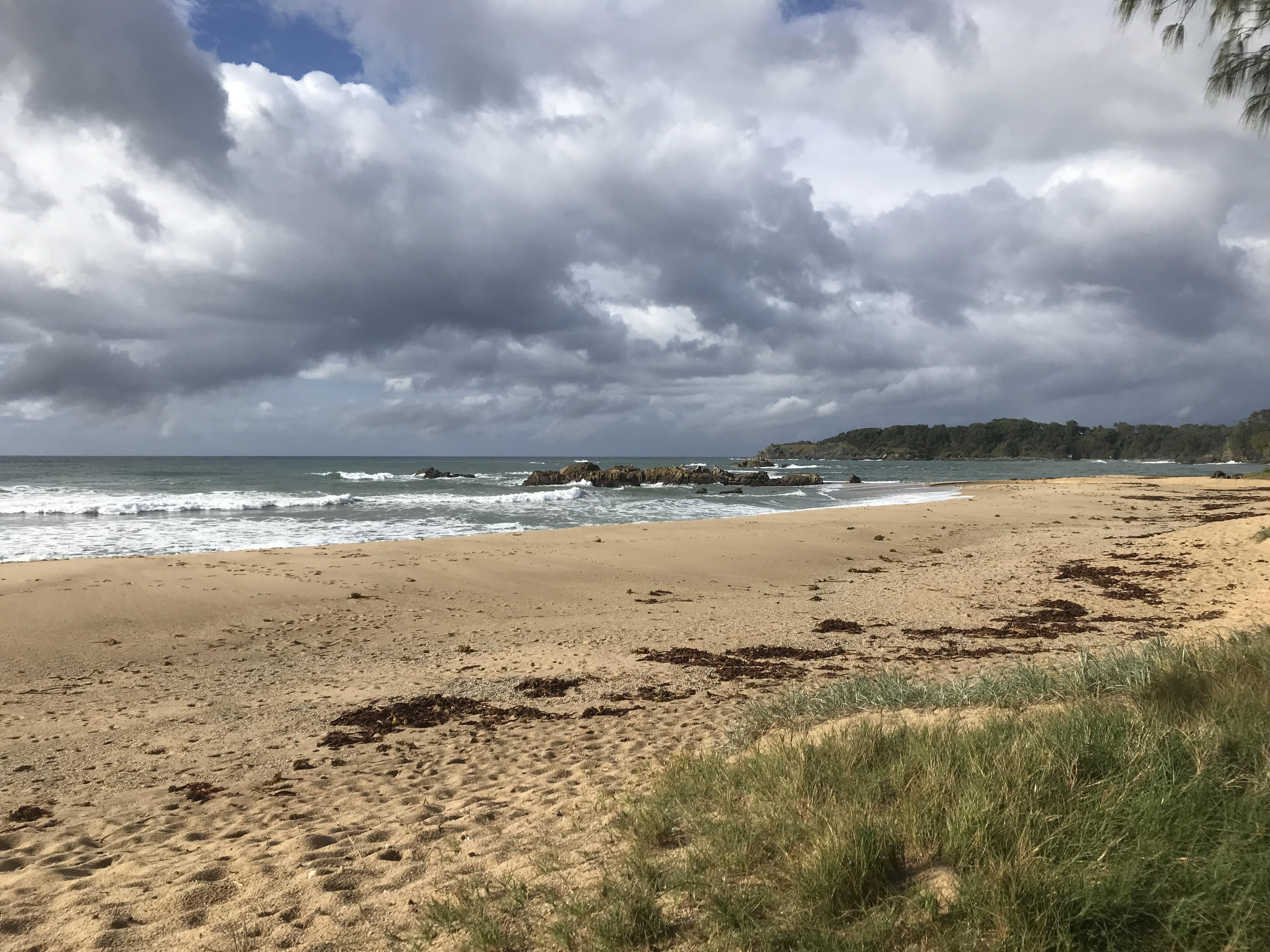
Hills Beach looking towards tombolo

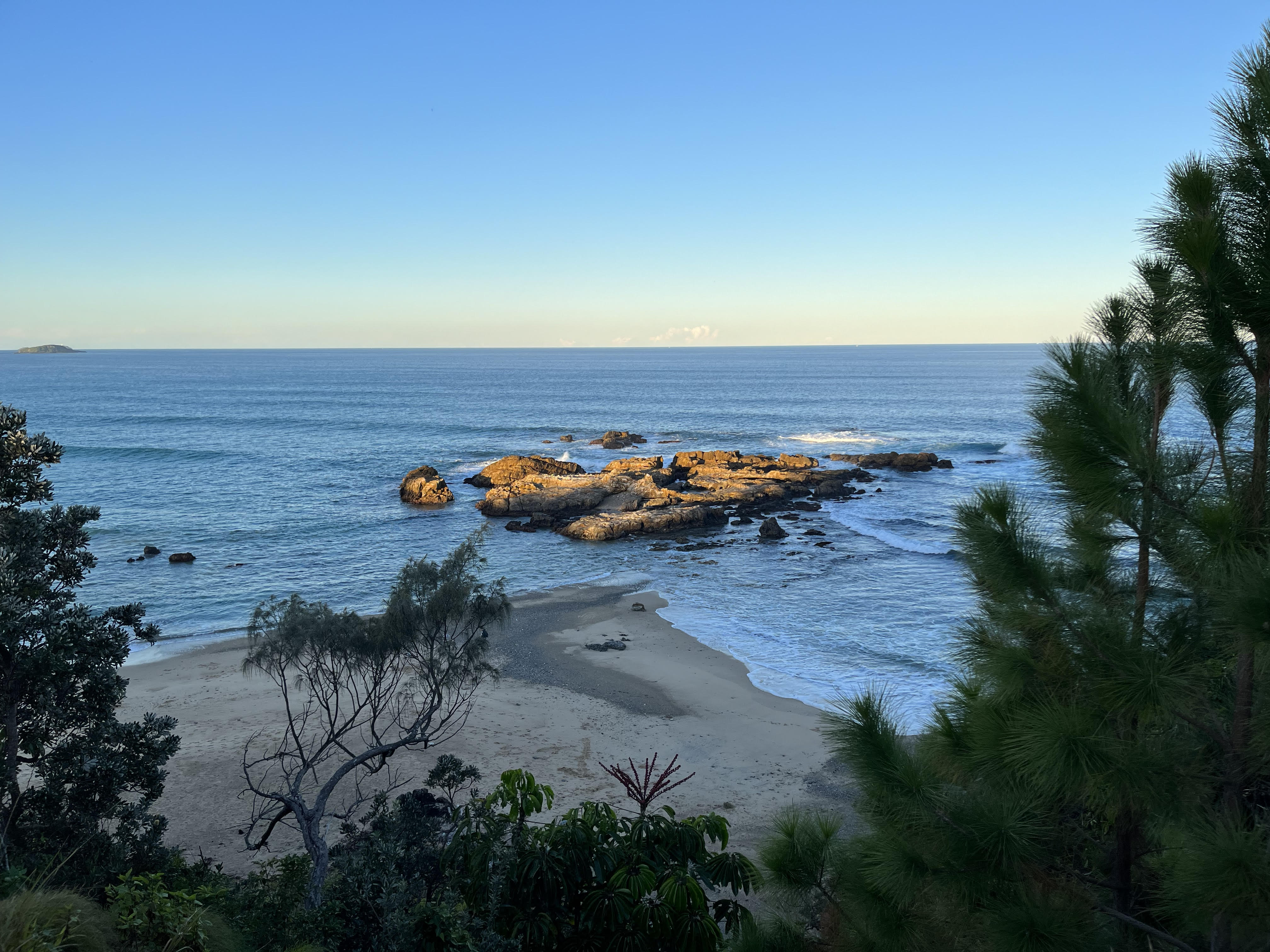
Hills Beach tombolo

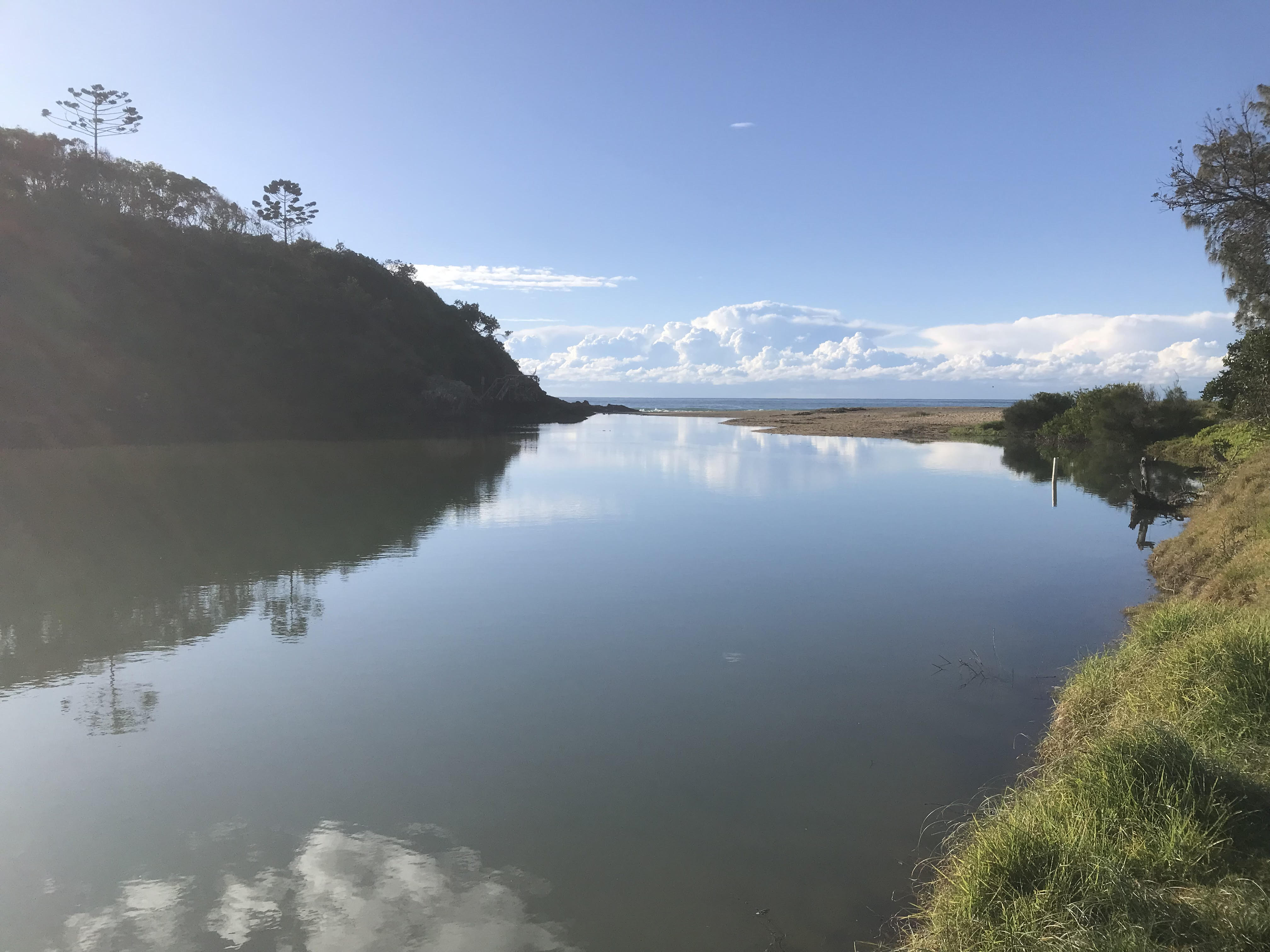
Pine Brush Creek

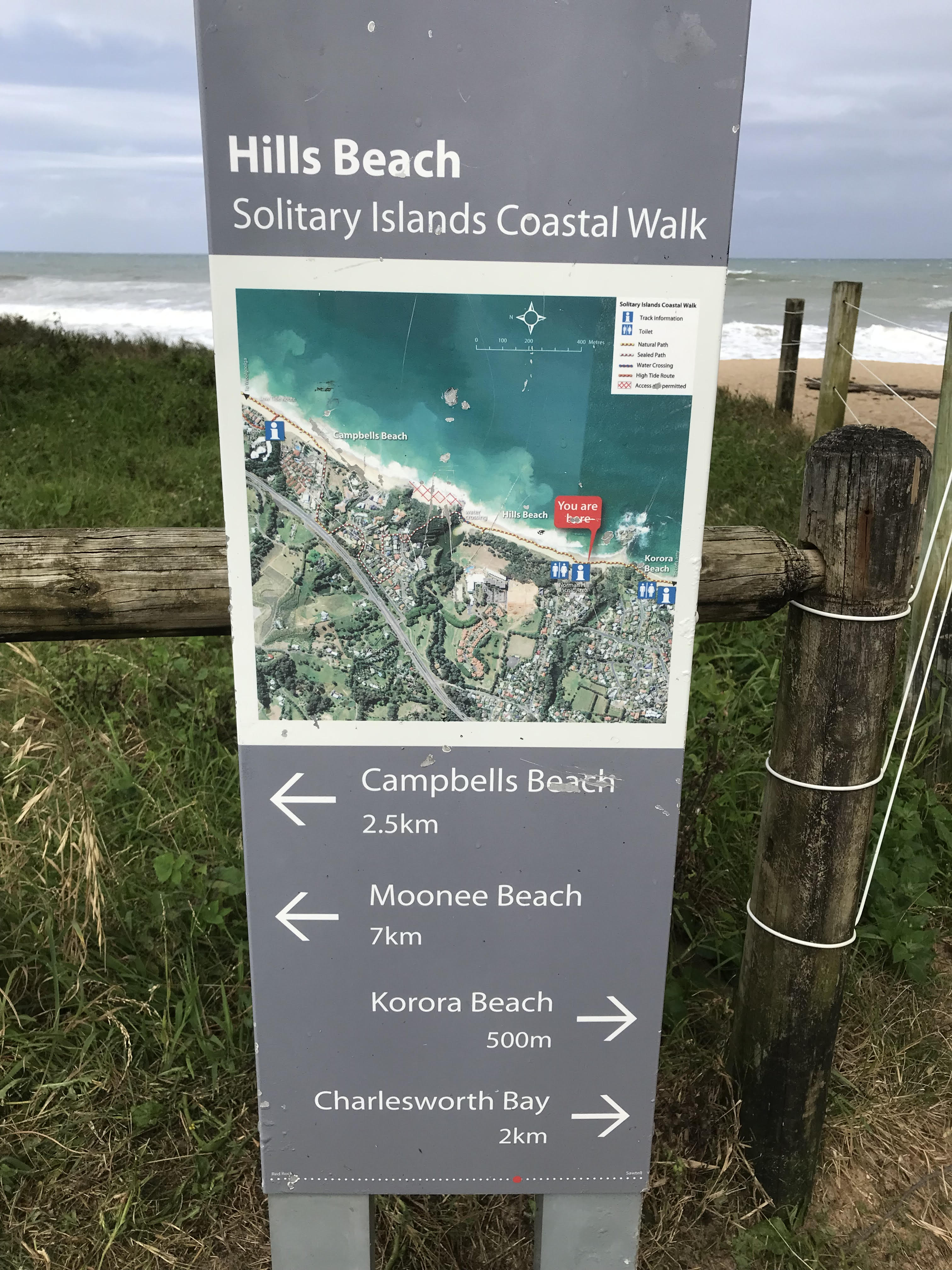
Solitary Islands Coastal Walk sign

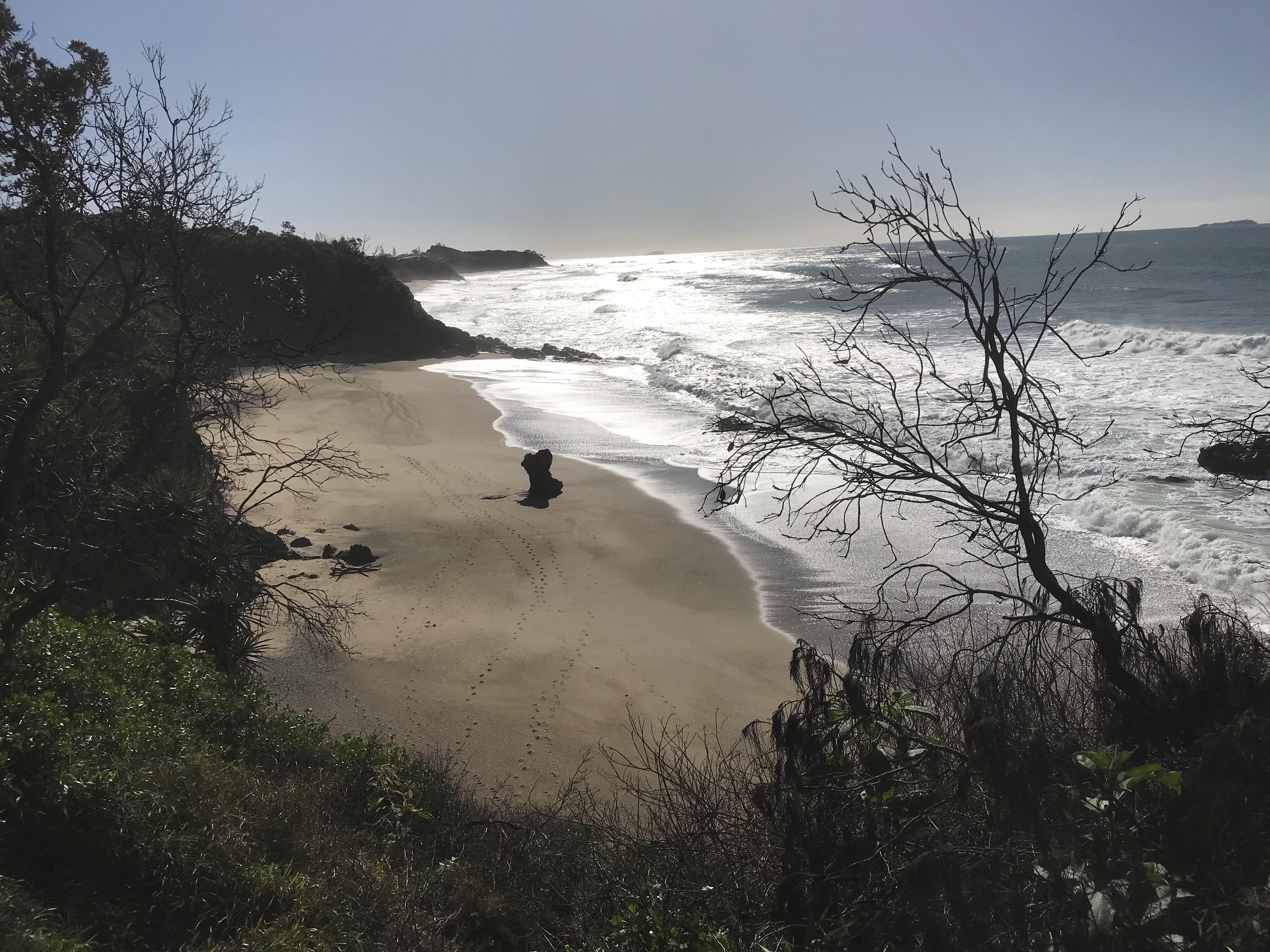
Hills North Beach

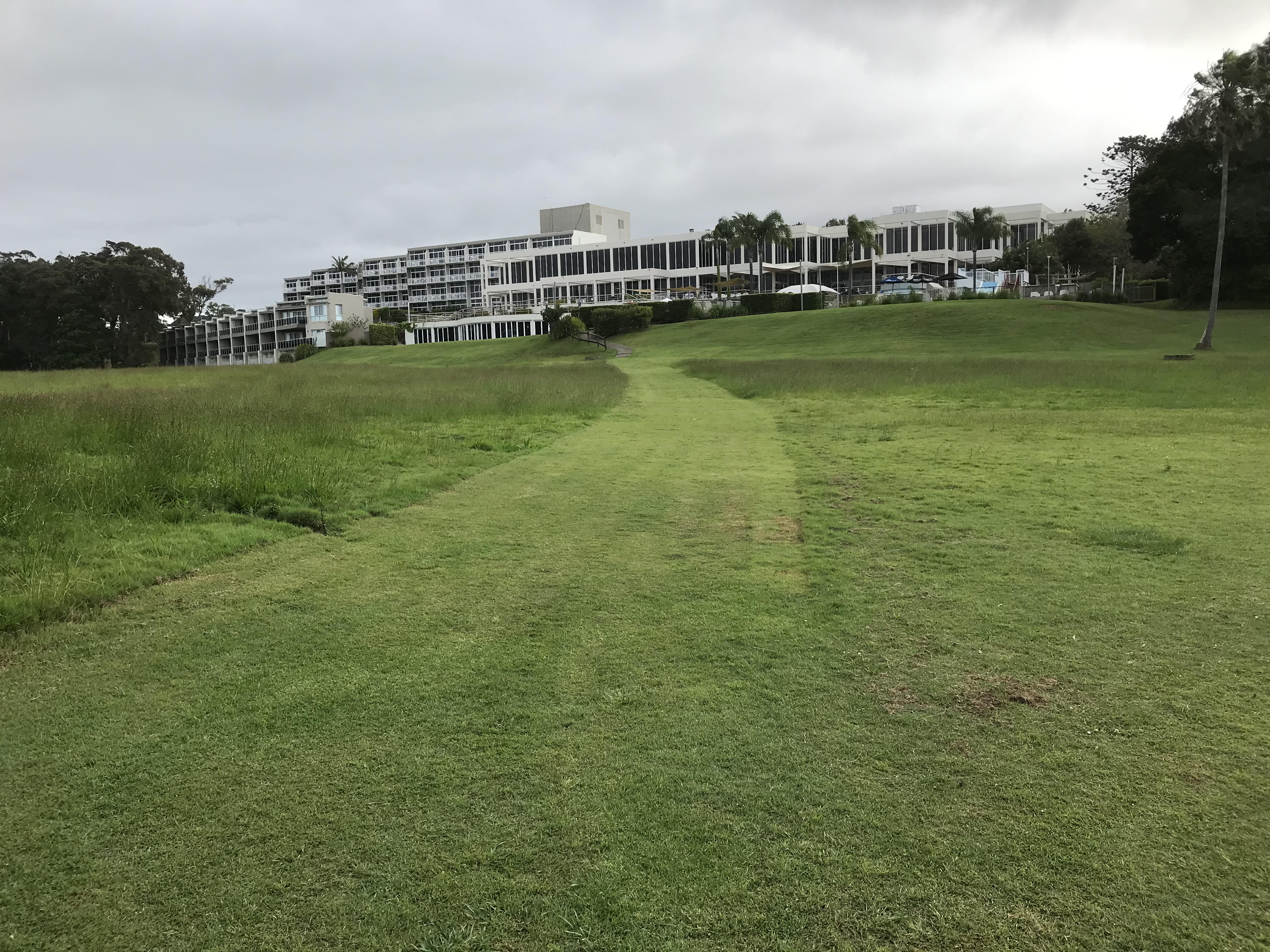
Opal Cove Resort

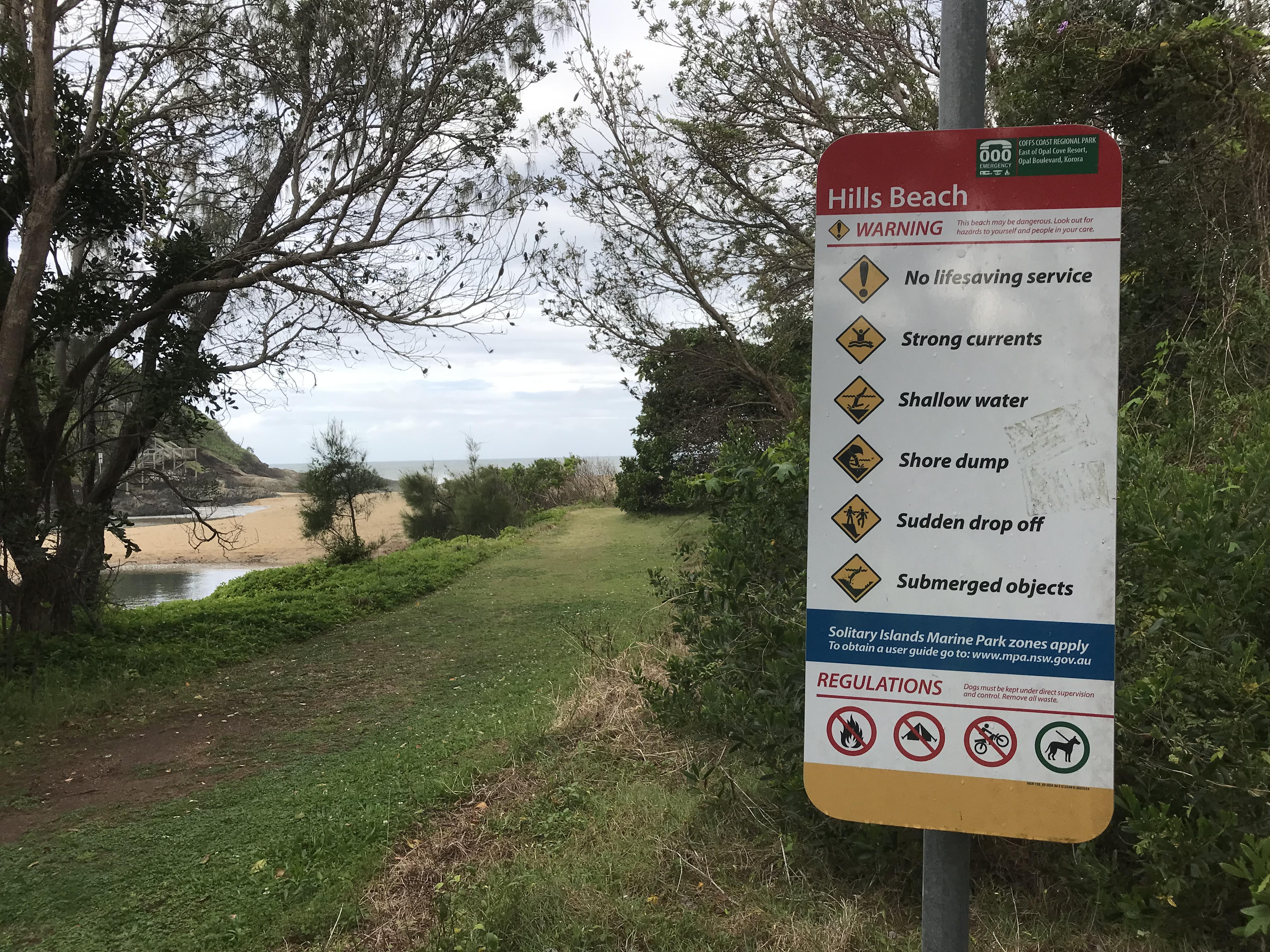
Hills Beach warning sign

Bushland in Coffs Coast Regional Park behind Hills Beach
