= Hermann Rieck =

German-born Australian farmer and journalist

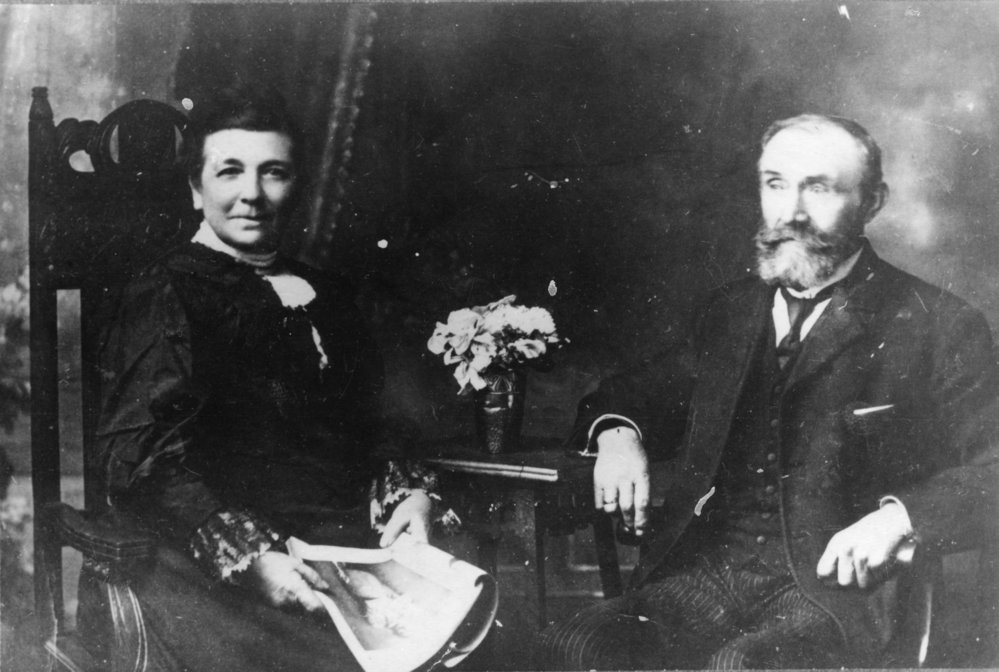
- Fanny and Hermann Rieck on their 25th wedding anniversary, Germany, 1917
- Born: c. 1837; Delmenhorst, Oldenburg, Germany
- Died: 1921 (aged 83–84); Munich, Germany
- Occupations: Farmer, Journalist
- Known for: Founder of banana industry in Coffs Harbour region
- Spouse: Fanny Elizabeth Rieck (nee Cox) (1860-1942)

Hermann Rieck (c. 1837–1921) was a pioneer farmer in the Coffs Harbour region of New South Wales, Australia, and the founder of the banana industry in the region.

== Early life ==
Hermann Rieck was born in Delmenhorst, Oldenburg, Germany c. 1837. He was reported to be from a wealthy family which had a publishing business. He was a non-commissioned officer in the Franco-Prussian War of 1870-1871, being involved in the German invasion of France, including the sieges of Metz and Paris.

== Move to Australia ==
He came to Australia c. 1878-1879. He initially worked as a journalist and editor in Adelaide, Melbourne, Brisbane and Toowoomba. He also took on various minor occupations to gain experience in the colonies, including book peddler, builder’s labourer and stock and station roustabout. His travels took him to various places in south-east Australia, looking for a suitable place to settle.

== Settlement and farming at Korora ==
In 1881, he travelled south by horse from Toowoomba, intending to go on to Sydney. At Grafton, he heard reports of good land on the coast to the south. Reaching the area of Korora, near Coffs Harbour, he found land that appealed to him, because of its beauty, the fertile soil, the equitable climate, and the availability of a harbour nearby. He then went to the land agent’s office in Kempsey to select a block of land to settle and was given 80 acres north of Pine Brush Creek at Korora.

At the time that Rieck settled in Korora, Aboriginal people and timber getters lived in the area, but there was no farming. He initially lived in a lean-to built in the space between the spurs of a large fig tree. In 1887, he built a hut made of slabs and lined with many thicknesses of newspaper. He established a farm where he experimented with a variety of crops, including sugar cane, maize, fruit, tobacco and pumpkins, as well as running livestock. He pioneered a method of clearing plots for cultivation by using pigs to dig up and manure the soil.

Rieck was naturalized as a British subject in the colony of New South Wales in 1886.

== Introduction of banana growing ==
Hermann Rieck introduced banana growing to the Coffs Harbour area around 1887. He obtained Cavendish banana plants (then known as ‘Fiji bananas’) from Queensland and planted them on his Korora property. By 1894, he had 6 acres (2.4 ha) planted. He initially had great difficulties in transport and marketing of the bananas. Local people had a negative attitude to his bananas, believing that they were inferior in taste and keeping qualities. The only available transport out for the bananas was a weekly mail coach and an occasional ship to Sydney. Other farmers were slow to follow Rieck and he remained the only grower in the region for decades. People thought that bananas would not grow well in a climate so far south and Rieck was regarded as a ‘crank’. However, gradually people came around and newcomers started growing them. By the 1940s, the Coffs Harbour area had become a major centre of banana growing in Australia.

== Marriage ==
Wanting to marry, but thinking that no woman would want to come to such a remote place, Rieck advertised in newspapers for a governess to educate his non-existent children. Fanny Cox, who had worked as a teacher in South Australia, answered his advertisement and travelled to the area by ship. Rieck showed her around his home and property, but she became alarmed when it became apparent that there was no wife and children living there. When he admitted to deceiving her, she was angry and demanded to be taken to Grafton where she had friends to stay with. Nevertheless, she agreed to marry him, and they were married in Grafton in 1892. Despite this unconventional start to the marriage, it was reported to be a happy one.

In 1899, the Riecks travelled to Europe and stayed 9 years, touring on bicycles through England, France, Holland, Belgium, Germany, Austria, Switzerland and Italy. While they were away, the Rieck farm was managed by Fanny’s brother, Tom Cox. The Riecks returned to Korora in 1908.

The Riecks had no children.

== Journalism ==
Hermann Rieck wrote articles promoting the Coffs Harbour region for a range of Australian newspapers in New South Wales, Queensland, Victoria and South Australia, including a German-language newspaper in South Australia. His articles induced many people to settle in the area.

While on their bicycle tours in Europe, Hermann and Fanny Rieck wrote a series of jointly authored articles about their travels, which were published in several Australian newspapers.

== Final years ==
By 1913, Hermann Rieck had failing health and was advised to live in a colder climate. They moved to Munich, Germany, where they bought a house in the village of Deisenhofen. When war broke out in 1914, they were detained as prisoners of war, but allowed to live in their home with restrictions. They suffered greatly from the shortage of food due to the war and from the cold. After the Armistice, when the German Mark experienced hyperinflation, they were affected by loss of the value of their savings. In 1921, their cottage caught fire and belongings were lost. Hermann Rieck had a stroke in July 1921 and died in August that year. He was buried in Deisenhofen.

Fanny Rieck was able to raise sufficient funds from sale of their cottage to return Coffs Harbour in 1922, where she lived in difficult financial circumstances. In 1928, she returned to live in Laura, South Australia, where she had grown up. She died there in 1942.

== Places named after Rieck ==
There are several places in the Coffs Harbour area named after Hermann Rieck, although some of them have misspelled his name as ‘Reick’. These are:

• Herman Reick Avenue, Korora

• Reicks Close, Sapphire Beach

• Riecks Point and Riecks Point Beach, Sapphire Beach

== Gallery ==
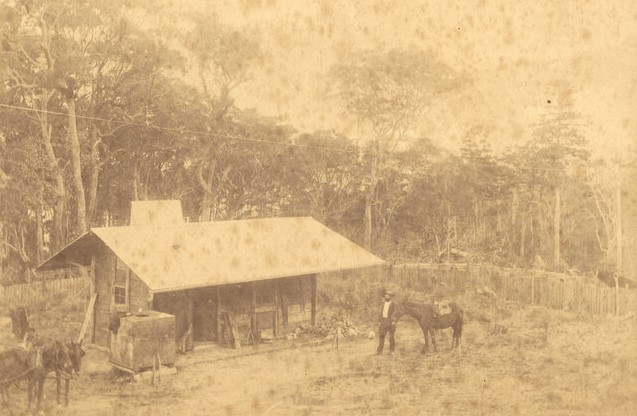
Hermann Rieck’s homestead, c. 1890

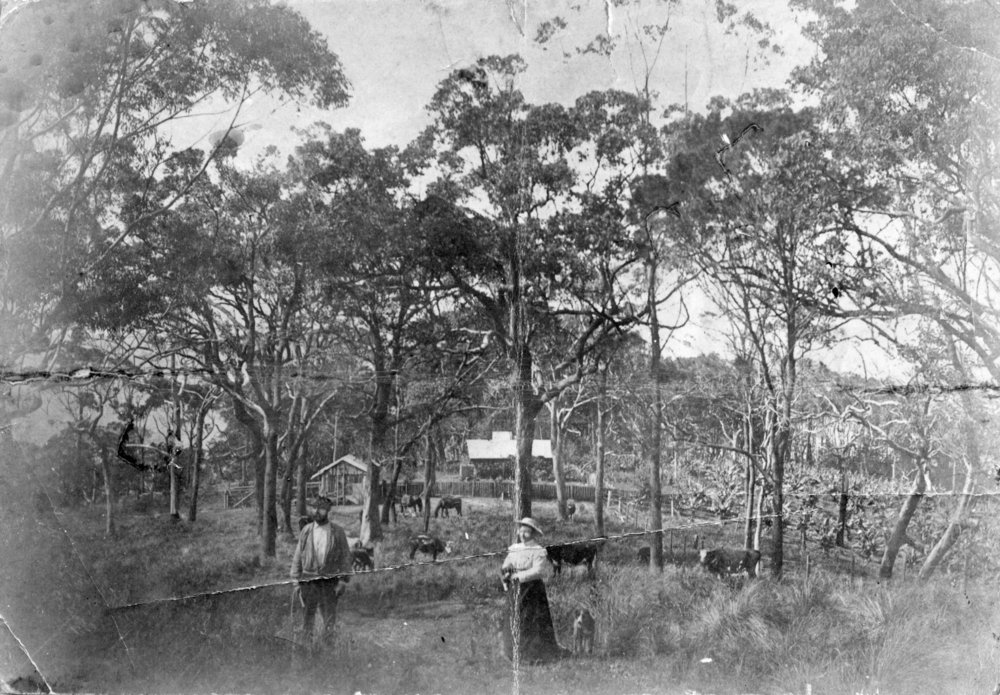
Hermann and Fanny Rieck on their banana farm, 1893

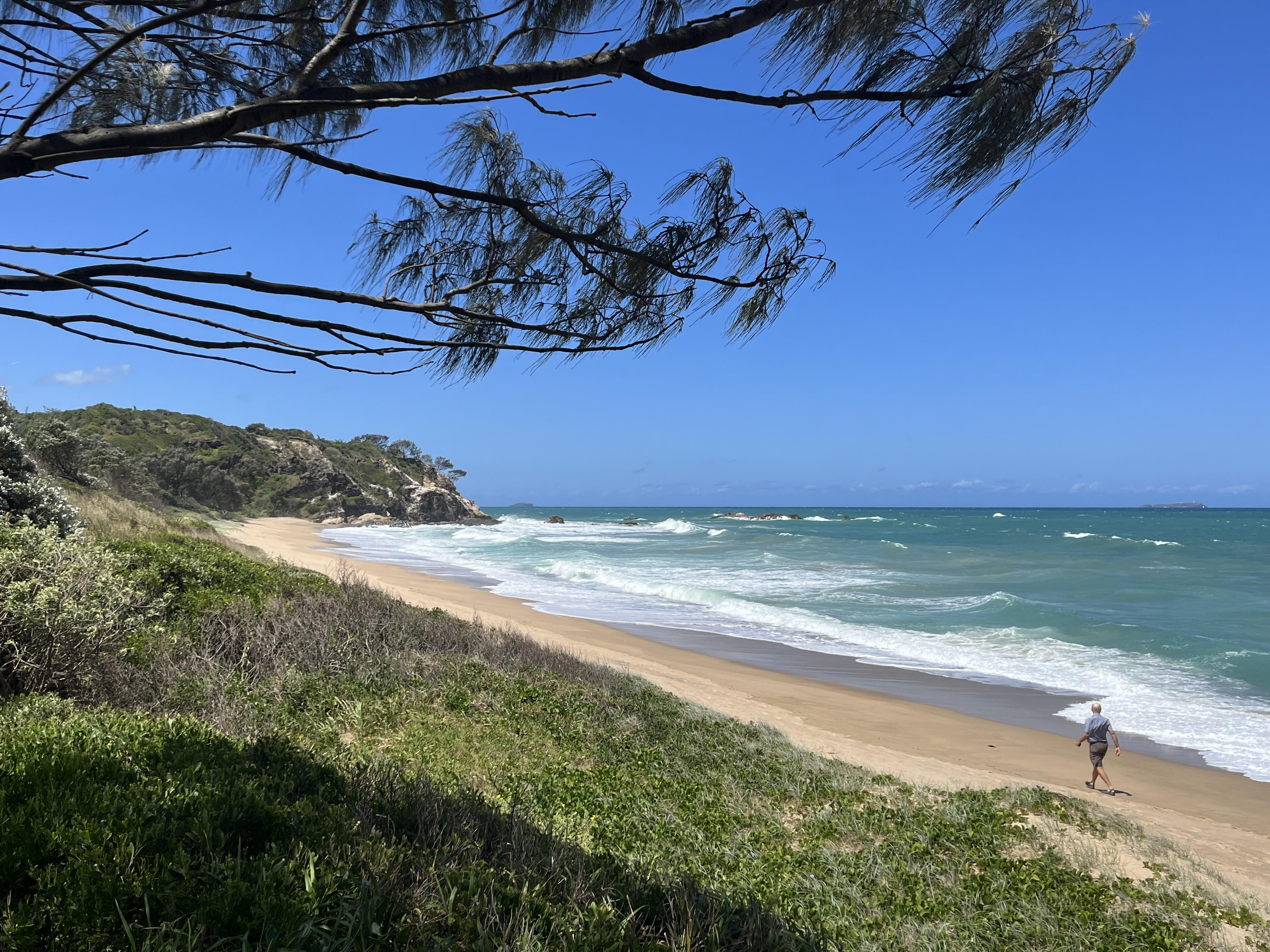
Riecks Point Beach, 2022

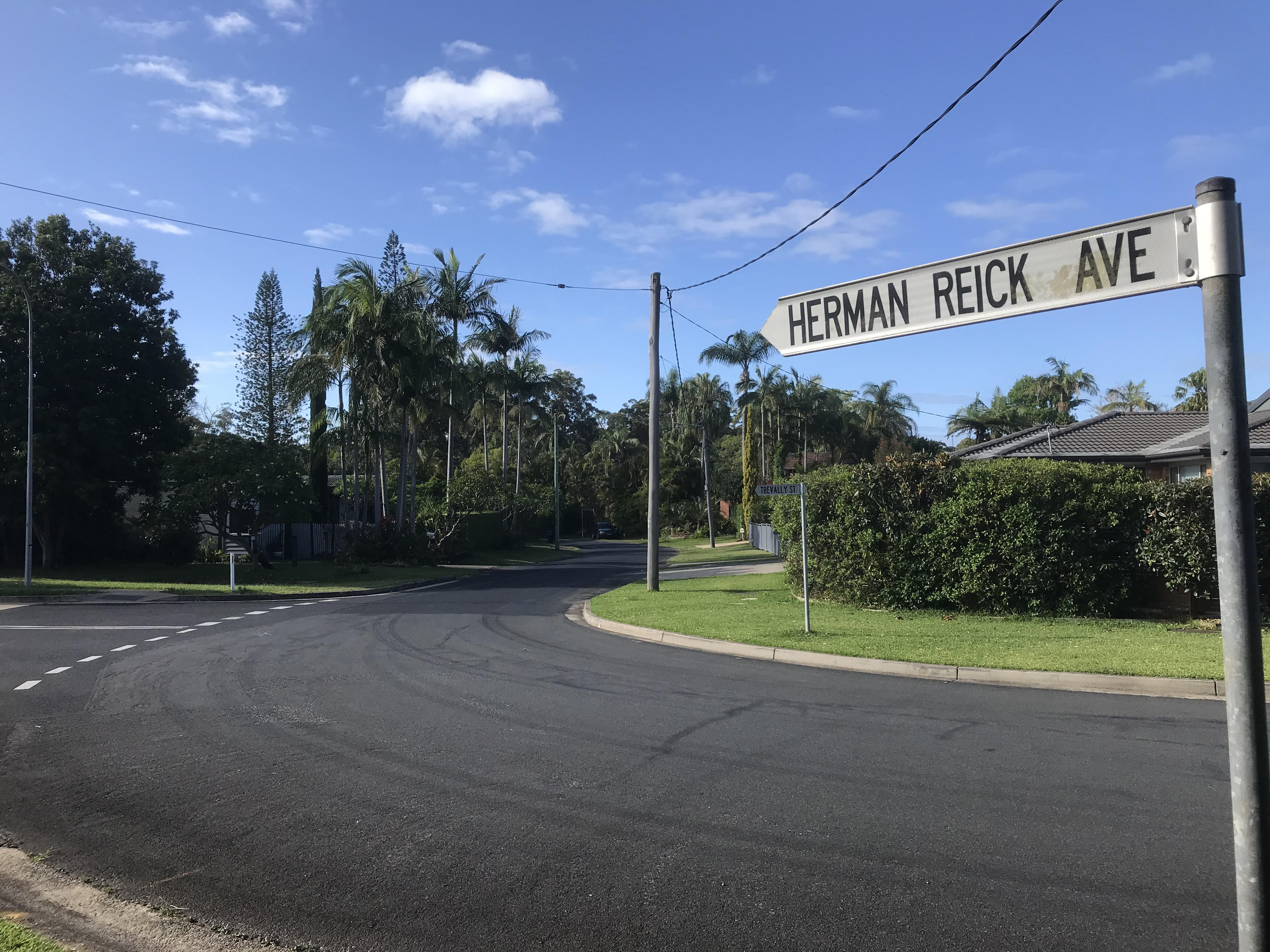
Herman Reick Avenue, Korora, 2022

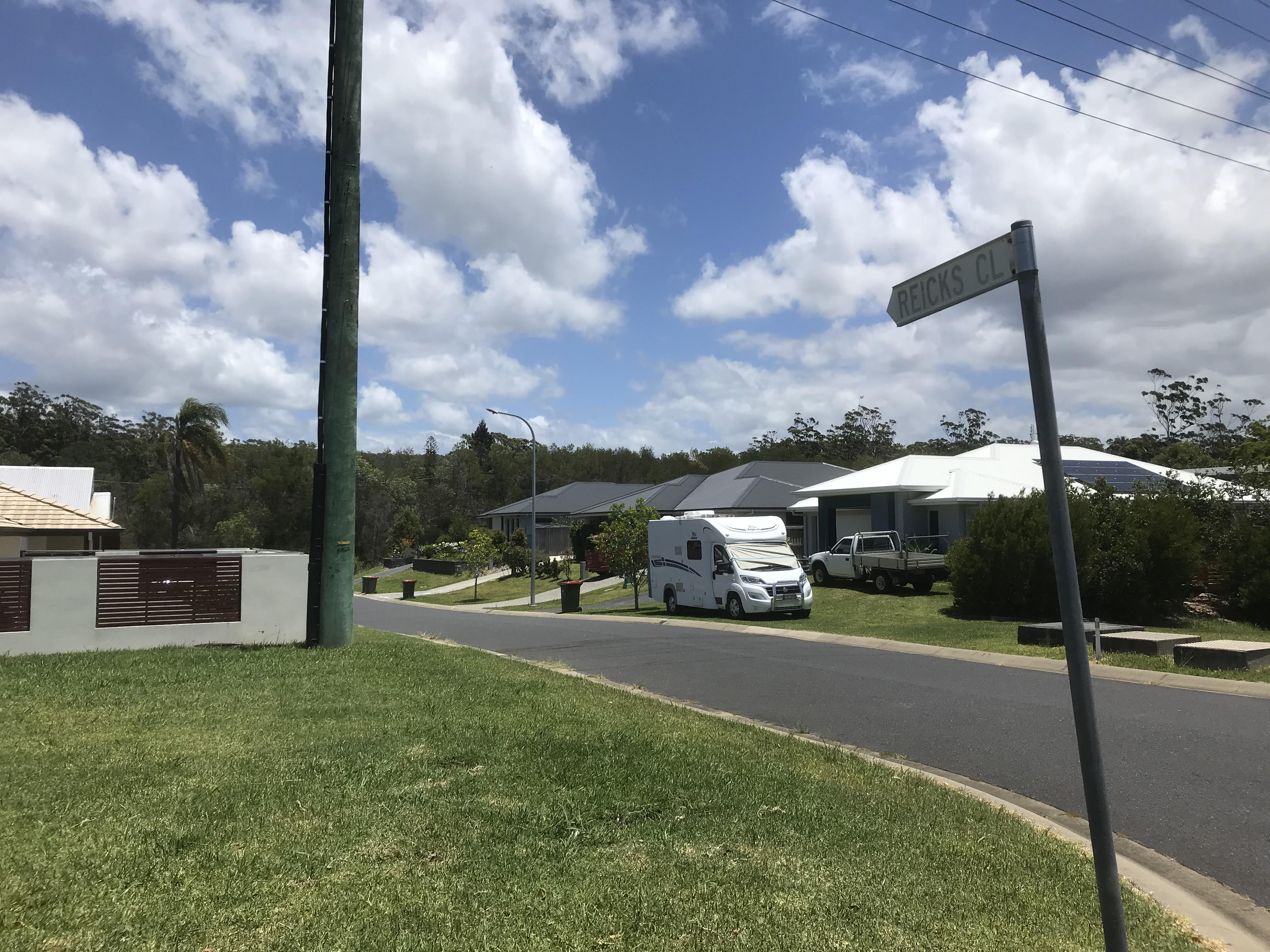
Reicks Close, Sapphire Beach, 2022
