= Ulidarra National Park =

National park in New South Wales, Australia

- IUCN category Ia (strict nature reserve)
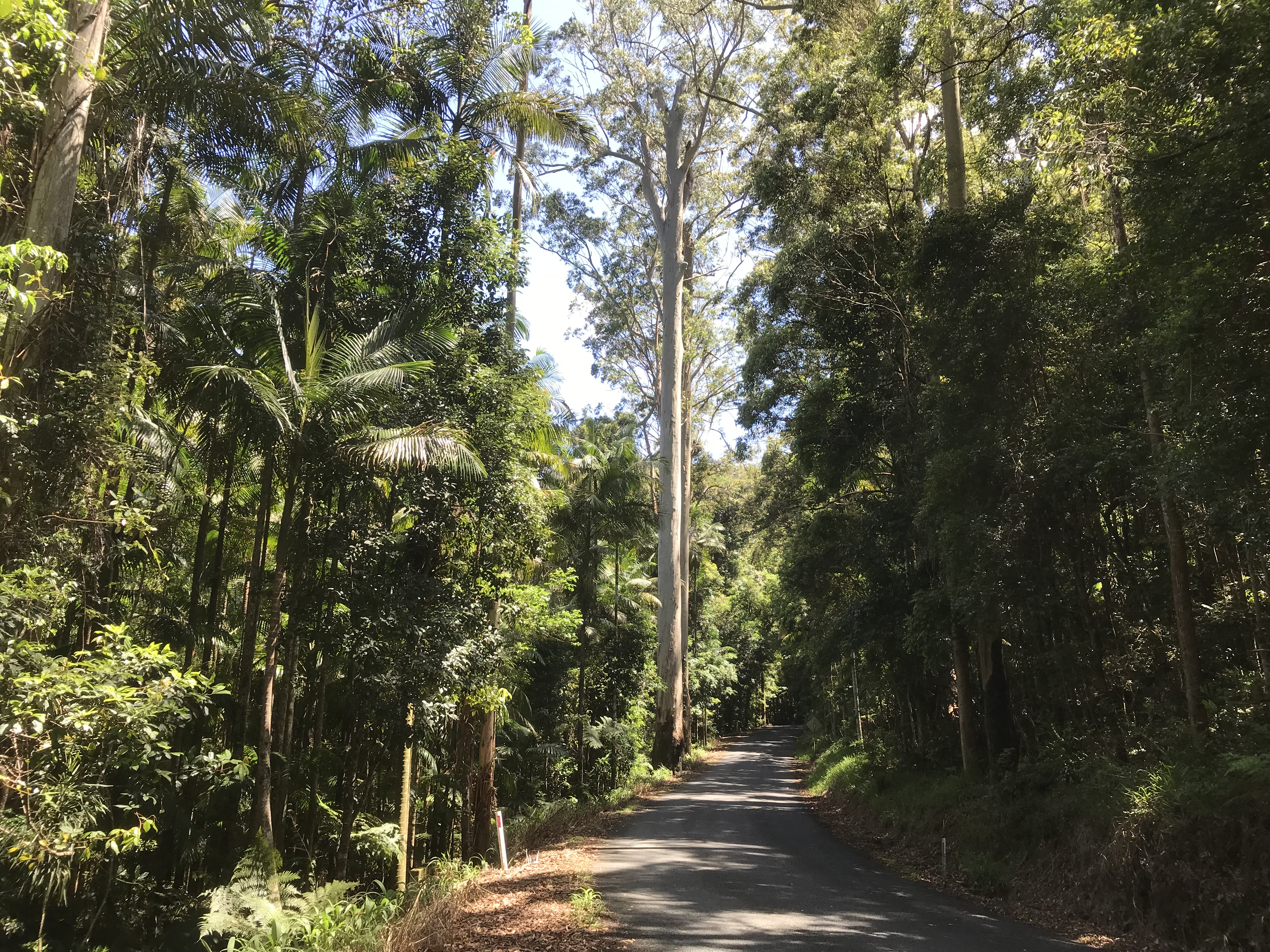

- Location within New South Wales
- Location: New South Wales
- Coordinates: 30°15′01″S 153°04′50″E
- Area: 6.8 km^{2} (2.6 sq mi)
- Established: 1999
- Governing body: NSW National Parks & Wildlife Service
- Website: Official website

Ulidarra is a national park in New South Wales, Australia, 442 km northeast of Sydney.

The Ulidarra National Park comprises huge forests. Picturesque rain forests and ancient eucalyptus trees adorn the park. These forests sustain a variety of bird life. Other recreational facilities in the park include majestic coastal views, trails for four-wheel drives, tracks for biking and walking. The minimum elevation of the terrain is 4m, and the maximum elevation is 585m.

The Park has a rich wildlife. Among the more popular inhabitants are the koalas, masked owls, wompoo fruit doves, dingoes and little bent-wing bats. This makes the Ulidarra National Park a great destination for wildlife and bird enthusiasts.

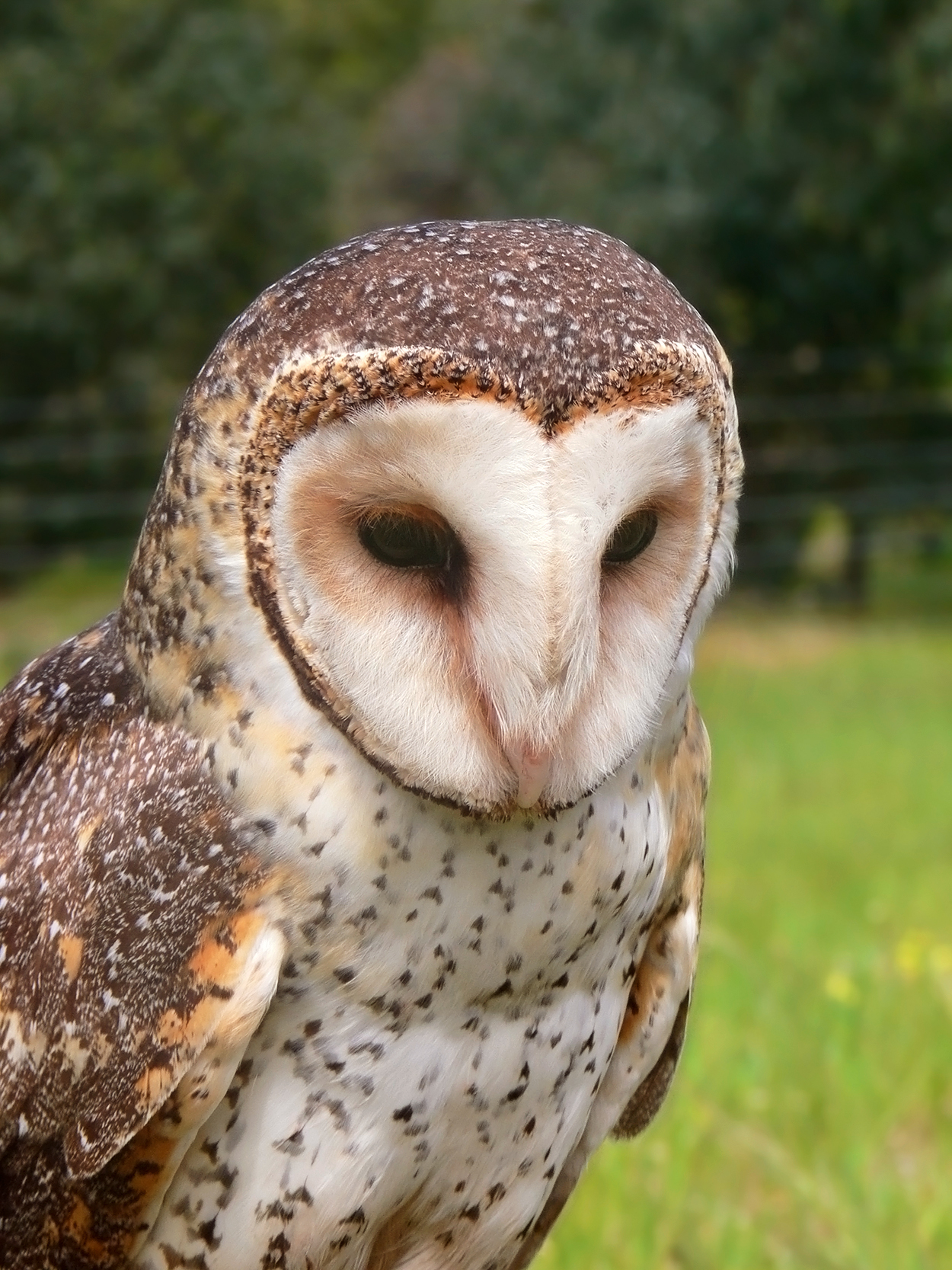
Australian masked owl

== See also ==
- Protected areas of New South Wales
