= Red Rock, New South Wales =

Red Rock
- Town
- Coordinates: 29°59′12″S 153°13′34″E
- Country: Australia
- State: New South Wales
- LGA: City of Coffs Harbour
- Location: 42 km (26 mi) N of Coffs Harbour; 54 km (34 mi) SE of Grafton

Government
  - State electorate: Coffs Harbour
  - Federal division: Page

Population
  - Total: 303 (2016 census)
- Postcode: 2456

Red Rock is a small hamlet in the northern beaches of the Coffs Harbour coast beside the banks of the Corindi River on the Mid North Coast of New South Wales, Australia, and is surrounded by National Parks. It is in the City of Coffs Harbour local government area. At the 2016 census, Red Rock had a population of 303 people.

The Red Rock headland, from which the town takes its name, is 20 metres (66 ft) high, is named for its vivid colour caused by the amount of rock jasper, an opaque silica, in its composition. This formation is believed to be more than 300 million years old.

The Traditional Owners of Red Rock and the surrounding areas are the Gumbaynggirr people who have occupied this land for thousands of years.

== History ==
Red Rock sits within the traditional Gumbaynggirr tribal area and it was first colonised in the 19th century when farmers established themselves at what is now Corindi Beach.

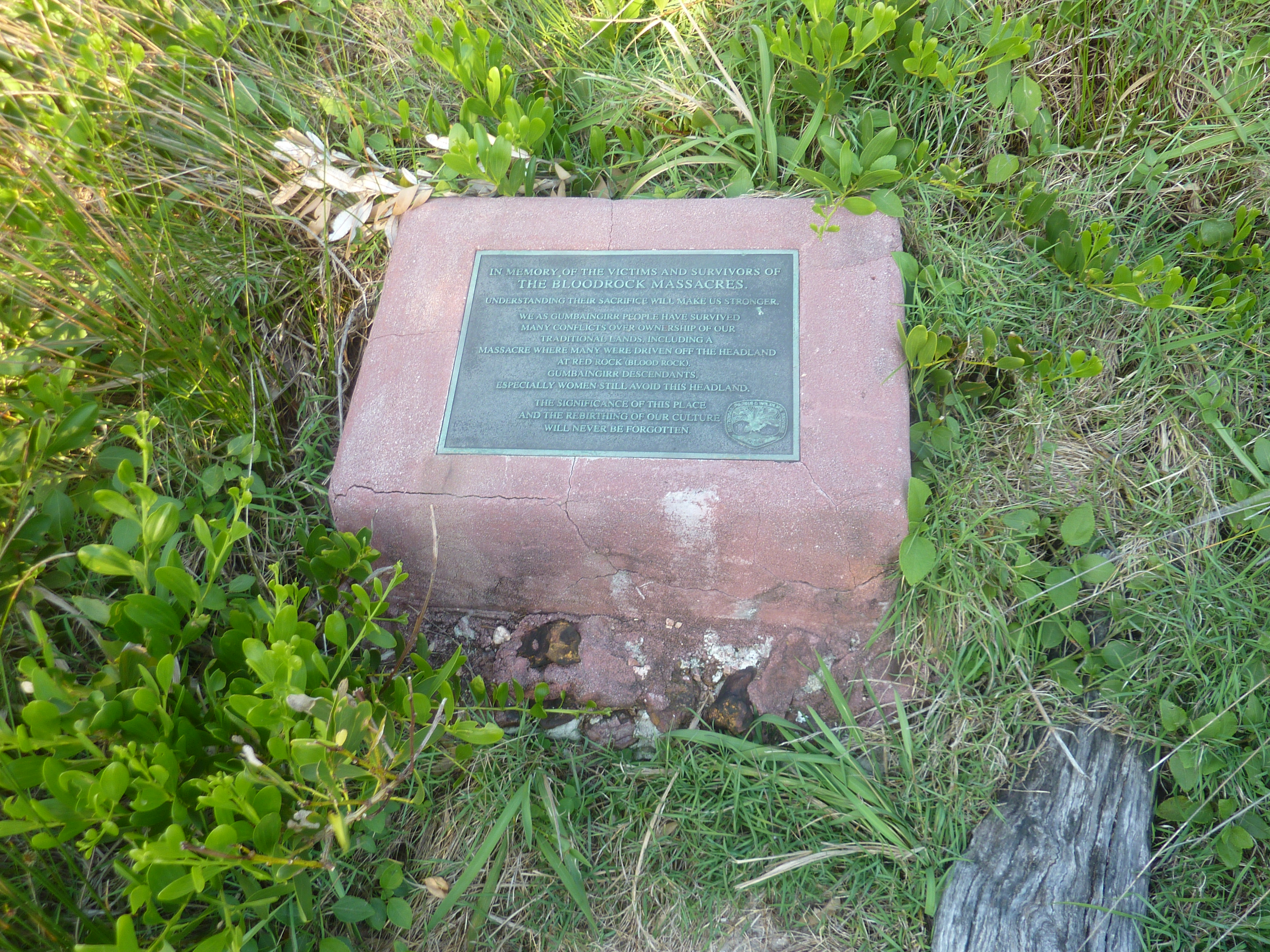
A plaque at Red Rock commemorating the Bloodrock Massacres

The headland is an extremely sacred site for the Gumbaynggirr people and it is also the site of a massacre of their people in 1841 which is known as the Bloodrock massacre as this is what many of the Garby (Gumbaynggirr) Elders began calling this place. The massacre began at Blackadders Creek when mounted police entered a campsite. They started shooting and then pursued the survivors to the Corindi River where they continued shooting. Some people were also driven off the headland. A memorial has been erected at the base of the headland to honour the victims and survivors of the massacre; it is now viewed as an important place for reflection

== Tourism ==
Red Rock is primarily a holiday village. Most of the residencies remain vacant throughout majority of the year—except during the school holidays. There is a lifesaving club, community centre, bowling club, a general store and caravan park located within the village.

The area has lovely beaches and the river is also good for swimming, kayaking and snorkeling. The southern beach can be dangerous and isn't recommended for children, but it provides excellent fishing and great shorebreak barrels which have been mastered by the local bodyboard surfers. It is easy to cross the estuary and explore the National Park to the north.
