= Susie Olive Kaylock =

- Born: Susie Olive Harden; 8 June 1892; Tintenbar, New South Wales, Australia
- Died: 19 August 1959 (aged 67); Bourke, New South Wales, Australia
- Other names: Susie Olive Rudder
- Occupation: leader in the country women's association
- Spouses: Reginald Rudder; John George Kaylock

Susie Olive Kaylock born Susie Harden aka Susie Rudder (8 June 1892 – 18 August 1959) was an Australian local government official and community worker taking a strong interest in the Country Women's Association.

== Life ==
Kaylock was born in Tintenbar, New South Wales in 1892. She was the first child born to Miriam Ada (born Everingham) and her Irish born husband, Henry Harden. Her mother took an interest in her education, as she was trained as a school teacher. Her father was a farmer and when she was a teenager they moved to the hamlet of Lower Bucca in New South Wales. She had lessons in singing and piano to supplement her education, and in about 1908 she was sent to a finishing school in Sydney. When she returned she was a piano teacher and she could dress make.

She married at the age of 23 at the local church, St Peter's Anglican Church, in Nana Glen. She married a banana farmer named Reginald Burdett Rudder and they had a son, but five weeks after the birth Reginald was killed. He had been in France with the Australian Imperial Force. On 3 May 1917 she became a widow. She had been living at their banana farm but she decided to rent that out.

She taught herself shorthand, typing and bookkeeping with the assistance of a correspondence course while she lived with her parents. She went to work in local government and promotion followed. By 1919 she was Dorrigo Shire Council's deputy shire clerk and she was able to buy her own house at Coramba. She went on to work with the town clerk's of Coonamble, Weddin and then Mudgee. In 1932 she married John George Kaylock at the oldest Australian Anglican church St Philip's Church in Sydney. He also worked for Mudgee Municipal Council. He continued to be a health inspector and she resigned so she could remarry.

The Country Women's Association of New South Wales had been operating since 1922 and now married she became a member attending the branch in Kempsey. In 1935 she was the treasurer and in 1940 she was the President. She continued her interest after they moved to South Grafton where she served in various roles including as a delegate. In 1956 she was President of the CWA's South Grafton Branch. In 1957 she moved to Bourke and she again supported the CWA. During her time with the CWA she had campaigned for women's issues including establishing a second class sleeper railway service to allow mothers to travel.

== Death and legacy ==
Kaylock died in Bourke from cancer in 1959. In 2019 it was decided to create a Kaylock Street in the Australian Capital Territory named after her. The street is in the Canberra suburb of Strathnairn.
