= Goodenia fordiana =

Scientific classification
- Kingdom: Plantae
- Clade: Tracheophytes
- Clade: Angiosperms
- Clade: Eudicots
- Clade: Asterids
- Order: Asterales
- Family: Goodeniaceae
- Genus: Goodenia
- Species: G. fordiana

Binomial name
- Goodenia fordiana Carolin

Species of plant

Goodenia fordiana is a species of flowering plant in the family Goodeniaceae and is endemic to north-eastern New South Wales. It is a prostrate herb with a rosette of leaves and yellow flowers near the end of leafy stalks.

== Description ==
Goodenia fordiana is a prostrate herb with a stalk up to 20 cm (7.9 in) high with a rosette of leaves at the base. The leaves are elliptic, 10–25 mm (0.39–0.98 in) long and 8–14 mm (0.31–0.55 in) wide abruptly tapering to a petiole 10–30 mm (0.39–1.18 in) long. The flowers are arranged near the ends of leafy racemes up to 200 mm (7.9 in) long, each flower on a pedicel up to 35 mm (1.4 in) long with linear bracteoles about 2 mm (0.079 in) long. The sepals are linear, about 2.5 mm (0.098 in) long, the corolla yellow, 8–10 mm (0.31–0.39 in) long. The lower lobes of the corolla are about 3.5 mm (0.14 in) long with wings about 2 mm (0.079 in) wide. Flowering occurs from October to December.

== Taxonomy and naming ==
Goodenia fordiana was first formally described in 1990 by Roger Charles Carolin in the journal Telopea from material collected in 1913 near Coramba. The specific epithet (fordiana) honours Neridah Ford who drew Carolin's attention to the species.

== Distribution and habitat ==
This goodenia grows in forest and woodland on the lower ranges of New South Wales between the Coffs Harbour area and Bulahdelah.
