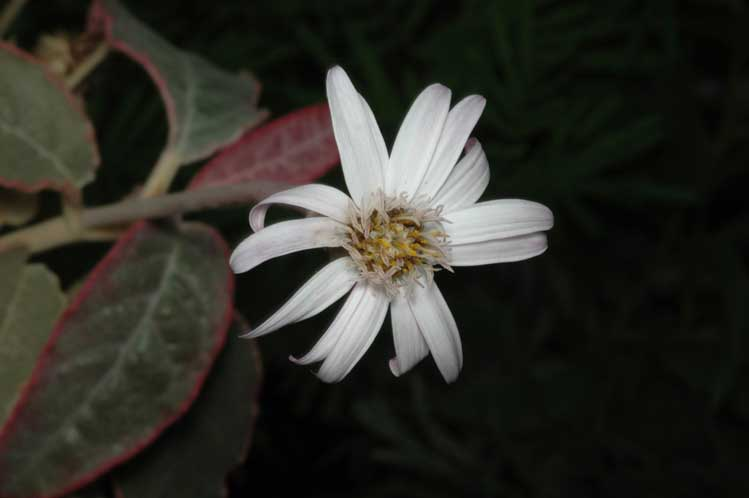
- In the Australian National Botanic Gardens

Scientific classification
- Kingdom: Plantae
- Clade: Tracheophytes
- Clade: Angiosperms
- Clade: Eudicots
- Clade: Asterids
- Order: Asterales
- Family: Asteraceae
- Genus: Olearia
- Species: O. stilwelliae

Binomial name
- Olearia stilwelliae N.G.Walsh

= Olearia stilwelliae =

Species of plant

Olearia stilwelliae is a species of flowering plant in the family Asteraceae and is endemic to New South Wales, Australia. It is a shrub with scattered elliptic or egg-shaped leaves, and pale blue, white and yellow, daisy-like inflorescences.

== Description ==
Olearia stilwelliae is a shrub that typically grows to a height of up to 60 cm (24 in). Its leaves are elliptic or egg-shaped, 25–134 mm (0.98–5.28 in) long and 16–35 mm (0.63–1.38 in) wide on a petiole 5–20 mm (0.20–0.79 in) long, the edges of the leaves sometimes toothed. The upper surface of the leaves is glabrous and the lower surface covered with felt-like hairs. The heads or daisy-like "flowers" are arranged singly in leaf axils on a peduncle up to 330 mm (13 in) long, and are 40–48 mm (1.6–1.9 in) in diameter. There are 8 to 12 usually white or pale blue ray florets, surrounding about 35 yellow disc florets, the ligule 15–18 mm (0.59–0.71 in) long. Flowering occurs from June to October and the fruit is a silky-hairy achene, the pappus with 77 to 100 bristles.

== Taxonomy ==
Olearia stilwelliae was first formally described in 1925 by William Blakely in the Proceedings of the Linnean Society of New South Wales from specimens collected at Nana Glen in 1998. The specific epithet (stilwelliae) honours "Miss Sylvia Stilwell who discovered the species with Mr. D. W. C. Shiress".

== Distribution and habitat ==
This olearia is grows in forest from north of Grafton to Woolgoolga in north-eastern New South Wales.
