= Park Beach =

Park Beach New South Wales
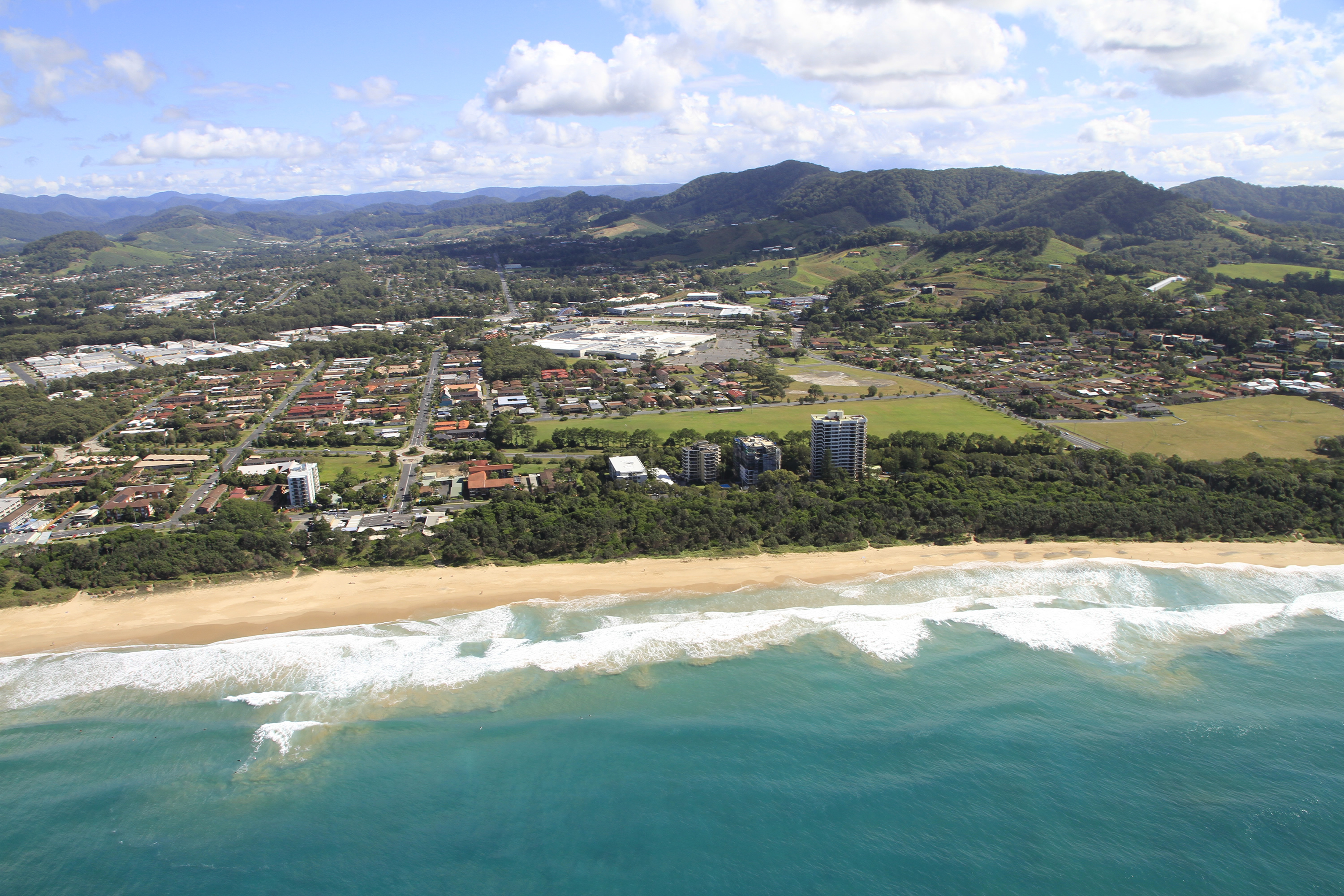
- Park Beach from above

- Coordinates: 30°17′23″S 153°07′08″E
- Population: 5,375 (2006)
- Postcode(s): 2450
- Elevation: 3 m (10 ft)
- Location: 545 km (339 mi) from Sydney; 435 km (270 mi) from Brisbane; 250 km (155 mi) from Surfers Paradise
- LGA(s): City of Coffs Harbour
- State electorate(s): Coffs Harbour
- Federal division(s): Cowper
Mean max temp	Mean min temp	Annual rainfall
23.3 °C; 74 °F	14.0 °C; 57 °F	1,674.6 mm 65.9 in

Park Beach is a suburb of Coffs Harbour, northern New South Wales, located in the north eastern part of the town. It has a population of around 5,000 which swells during summer as it is a coastal tourist destination containing many motels, backpackers and other forms of accommodation. The suburb of Park Beach is generally considered to be the area within the Ocean Parade and Orlando Street intersection at the south, the Orlando Street and Woolgoolga Road intersection, the turnoff from the Pacific Highway onto Macauleys Headland Drive, and the southern end of the Coffs Coast Regional Park.

== Geography ==
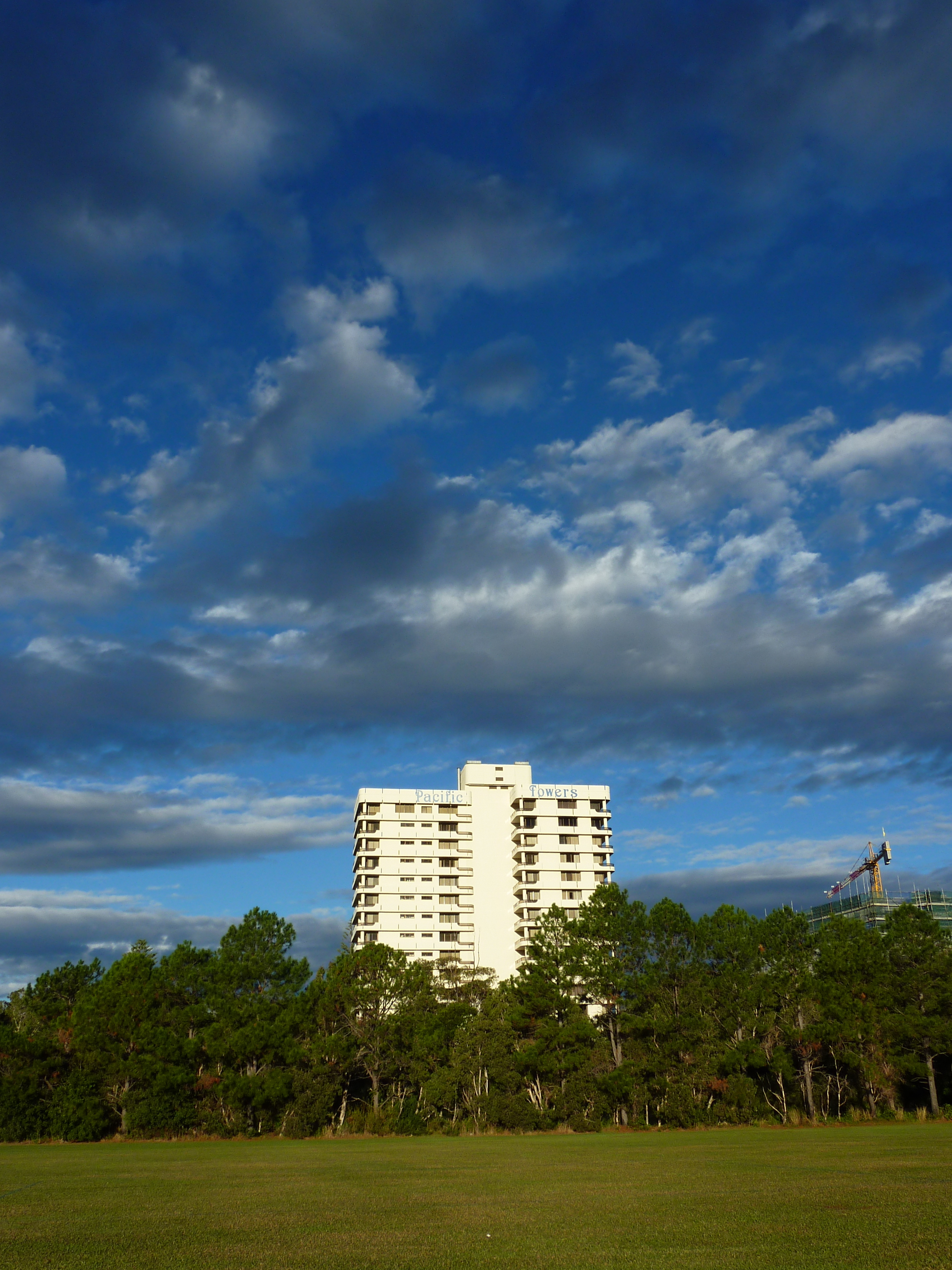
Pacific Towers viewed from York Street Playing Fields, with the site of the stalled $13 million, 9 storey Beaches high rise development visible to the right.

Park Beach lies largely at sea level and is bordered on the eastern side by the Pacific Ocean. The beach itself (also named Park Beach) is a prominent part of the geography, and runs onto the elevated Diggers Headland and Coffs Coast Regional Park in the north. At the western side it is bordered by the suburb of North Coffs, while at the south lies North Wall, infamous for its strong rips which contributed to a 2009 drowning, and the Coffs Harbour Jetty.

=== Beach ===
The beach itself is a patrolled scenic surf beach facing east onto the Pacific Ocean, with Diggers Headland and the Coffs Coast Regional Park at the northern end, and North Wall and Little Muttonbird Island at the southern end. The Coffs Harbour marina is clearly visible at the south. The beach is around 1.8 km long and runs north to south. It is Coffs Harbour's main patrolled surf beach and was used by 55,548 people between April and September 2011. As a result, it is now patrolled year-round.

Its surroundings consist of bushland and a caravan park, and a toilet, showers, a car park and a picnic area are all available. The Macauleys surf break is popular with both local and visiting surfers; other popular activities at the beach include sunbathing, swimming, kite surfing, diving, fishing, snorkelling, spear fishing and walking. The nearby Solitary Islands are also a popular destination for diving and boat tours, many of which depart from Park Beach.

== Attractions ==
Park Beach is home to the largest shopping centre between Newcastle and the Gold Coast, Park Beach Plaza. Other important places in the area include Park Beach Homebase, Northside Shopping Centre, the Park Beach Holiday Park, Park Beach Bowling Club, York Street Playing Fields, Pacific Towers, the Coffs Harbour Surf Life Saving Club and the Hoey Moey. The Coffs Harbour Food and Wine Festival was formerly held annually at the southern end of Park Beach (Park Beach Reserve), on the edge of Coffs Creek.

In October 2012, it was announced that Park Beach would be undergoing a $275,800 beautification program involving the construction of a viewing platform and equal access ramp from the beach carpark to public amenities and the main surf club entrance.

== Demographics ==
Many of the demographics of Park Beach fall outside those of the rest of Coffs Harbour and surrounding regions – "car ownership is less than half that of the rest of the mid north coast; the average household size is much smaller; household incomes are lower and the population tends to be more transient." It also has a higher population of both indigenous and overseas-born residents than the surrounding areas, and a lower elderly population. The population is steadily on the rise, with an increase of 357 or around 7% between 2001 and 2006, making it Coffs Harbour's second highest growth region behind West Coffs though the average persons per household has fallen slightly in that time frame suggesting an increase in new properties being built.

== Crime ==
Park Beach has earned a reputation as a hotspot for violence, vandalism and drug crime, particularly in Boultwood Street, Prince Street and Vincent Street, and the area has been flagged as a 'red zone' (high density hotspot) by the NSW Bureau of Crime Statistics and Research for domestic violence related assault, break and enter, graffiti, malicious damage to property and theft-related offences. This is largely due to the low socioeconomic standard of the neighbourhood, as it is part of the poorest electorate in Australia and it contains a large amount of public housing. However, efforts are being made to clean up the area and improve its image and residents' safety including the formation of the Park Beach Community Group and a $200,000 injection of council funds in 2010.

== Sport ==
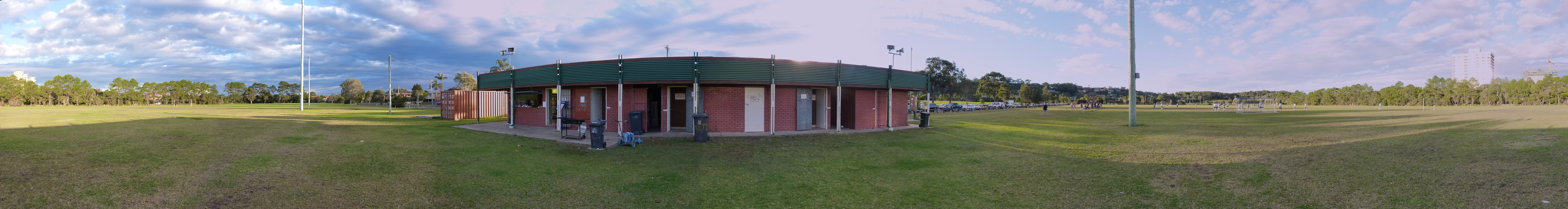
Panorama of York Street Playing Fields showing clubhouse.

The suburb is home to the Park Beach Bowling Club (current district fours champions), the PBBC Colts cricket team (finalists of the 2010 Coffs Coast Twenty20 Cup and winners of the 2011 minor and major premierships) and North Coast Football's Northern Storm Football Club, whose junior teams play their home games at the York Street sporting fields. Even the area's sporting teams have been hit by crime but continue to call the area home.
