= Ferguson's Cottage =

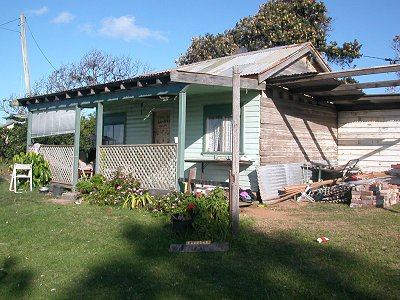

- Location within New South Wales Location within Australia
- 30.3108°S 153.1400°E
- Location: 1 Breakwater Road, Coffs Harbour, City of Coffs Harbour, New South Wales, Australia

Site notes
- Architect: Department of Public Works
- Owner: Land and Property Management Authority (LPMA)

New South Wales Heritage Register
- Official name: Ferguson's Cottage; Fergusons
- Type: state heritage (built)
- Designated: 27 November 2009
- Reference no.: 1802
- Type: Place of significance
- Category: Aboriginal
- Builders: Department of Public Works

Ferguson's Cottage is a heritage-listed residence at 1 Breakwater Road, Coffs Harbour, a city in the Mid North Coast region of New South Wales, Australia. It was designed and built by the New South Wales Department of Public Works. It was added to the New South Wales State Heritage Register on 27 November 2009. It remains a private residence.

== History ==
=== Public works office ===
The building was originally associated with the construction or maintenance of the South Coffs breakwater by the Public Works Department, probably as a temporary construction office.

Coffs Harbour was constructed in stages. Work began in 1912 on a causeway from the mainland to South Coffs Island, where a quarry was opened on the headland, a railway laid and plant installed.

Whilst work on the exposed eastern breakwater (extending out from South Coffs Island) begun in 1918, numerous wash-aways resulted in the wall not being completed until October 1939, with the finishing work of concreting the core of the wall completed in 1943. The inadequate size of the rock available from the quarry on South Coffs Island was a major cause of the breakwater's instability. The casting and tipping of 100 ton concrete blocks to armour the seaward face helped solve the problem.

As construction buildings including offices were generally built by carpenters often without plans and demolished on completion of the work, or moved to another site if transportable, the building is likely to be a rare surviving example of such a structure. The fact that the cottage is sitting on the original sleeper substructure, suggests it was probably not intended to serve for a long term.

=== Ferguson family ===
Association of the building with the Ferguson Family started with Mr Andrew Ferguson who was a ganger and works supervisor for the Department of Public works on the breakwater construction in the late '40s, '50s and '60s.

The Public Works' Coffs Harbour District Engineer at the time, Hugh Bailey, entered into an arrangement with Mr Ferguson to allow his family to occupy the "office" as a family home during the early 1950s. Prior to this arrangement the family lived on the nearby block of Dung Hill. Repair dumping to the Harbour was needed in 1953 and whilst it is possible that the building was an office associated with that work, it could have been built when earlier works were underway, as Ferguson's occupation was justified on the basis that no construction work was taking place.

Allowing the family to occupy the "office" as a cottage was an exceptional step for a Government official at the time. In the 1950s, the status of Aboriginal people was quite different from the present day. The decision was based on two reasons, one explicit and the other implicit.

The explicit reason was in exchange for Andrew Ferguson providing oversight of the harbours southern headland and construction areas in the periods when no construction work was taking place. This is the formal justification cited by offices of the Department of Public Works. In the succeeding years the arrangement with the Ferguson family was endorsed by successive district engineers of the Department, including Len Harper in the 1960s and Ron Colley in the 1970s. (They acknowledged the arrangement to the members of the community and to officers of the Department of Lands.)

Repair dumping to the Harbour was needed in 1953 and whilst it is possible that the building was an office was associated with that work, it could have been built when earlier works were underway, as Ferguson's occupation was justified on the basis that no construction work was taking place.

The implicit reason that the Fergusons were allowed to make their home in the cottage was the high regard that the Public Work's District Engineer held for the good works and social contribution made by Andrew Ferguson's wife, Evelyn Ferguson, or "old Mrs Ferguson" as she was known in the Public Works Office at Coffs Harbour. (This can be attested to by a retired officer of the Department who still resides in Coffs Harbour.)

At the Department's Head Office in Sydney, successive Principal Engineers of the then Harbours and Rivers Branch, (subsequently Rivers and Ports Branch, and Coastal Branch), including John Kerle, Glan Evans, Michael Clarke and John Malone acknowledged the arrangement in their dealings on the harbour.

When the Department was considering conceptual plans for a large tourist development on the southern foreshore in the early 1980s under the then Minister Laurie Brereton, it specifically excluded any intrusion on the Ferguson dwelling because their valid occupation of site was not disputed.

Mrs Evelyn Ferguson, also known as Nanny Ferguson, was an exceptional lady. Her life had lasting significance to both the Aboriginal and white communities of Coffs Harbour, the north coast region and beyond.

During the 1950s and 1960s, the status of Aboriginal people was low and relationships with the broader community were strained. Housing was poor, education was minimal and health conditions were unacceptable. Evelyn Ferguson was a strong Aboriginal woman who confronted all of these issues head-on over her life, and in doing so provided a bridge between the Aboriginal and white communities and was a pioneer in many aspects of Aboriginal life that are now accepted as conventional.

Evelyn Ferguson had the ability to function equally in both Aboriginal and white communities because of her wisdom, her communication skills and the respect in which she was held. She was an active member of the Seven Day Adventist Church and encouraged her family to attend services, facilitating cross-cultural mixing and friendships at a time when it was rare. She was held in high regard by the police, who knew her as "Granny Ferg". On many occasions during the 1950s and 1960s they brought the communities' and individual's problems to her for mediation and resolution because of her wisdom, respect and authority.

She was also a well regarded and integral contact point between "the Welfare" and the local and regional Aboriginal communities. In the early days, "the Welfare" constantly intervened between kids and their families, and the families from the local area and further afield looked to Nanny Ferguson for advice and protection. Her battles with welfare and social service authorities were many. She stood up for the kids, saw that their rights were observed, gave assurances on their behalf and then ensured that the assurances were honoured. In the role of an Elder, she took it upon herself to protect the communities' children and defend their rights. Her strength of character meant that her words carried authority and were accepted by both "the Welfare" and the Aboriginal community.

She was also respected by the business community of Coffs Harbour. She was a personal friend of the Symmonds family who operated a large department store, and went fishing with them on many occasions. She was known and respected by Hugh Bailey, the Public Works District Engineer - the person responsible for allocating the dwelling to her family. Such relationships during that time were extraordinary and provided an exemplary model of cross cultural acceptance for both the Aboriginal European people in the Coffs Harbour and wider community.

The "bridge" that Nanny Ferguson forged between the Aboriginal community and local and wider community and servises was vital to the lives and history of inter community relations for the local Aboriginal people, those in the coastal region and beyond.

In the 1950s and 1960s, education amongst Aboriginal children was merely something one did to avoid "the Welfare". Nanny Ferguson did much to change this by example, insisting that all her children, grandchildren and extended family gain the best possible education. She recognised that education was the key to future employment and community advancement and endeavoured to convince others of this. Despite the burdens of her own family, Nanny Ferguson held down a job as a laundress at the District Hospital and later the Sunny Side Maternity Hospital. In doing so provided a role model for her community. Such influence has continued, and today education remains a core value of the community.

Nanny Ferguson is remembered by the local and wider European and Aboriginal community as a lady brimming with love and care. As well as her own children, she took in nephews and nieces, grandchildren, members of the extended family and anyone who needed help from the local and wider Aboriginal community. No-one was ever denied a bed or a meal. Sometimes the little cottage accommodated up to 15 children and half a dozen adults who were in need of shelter and assistance. It was for this reason that the extension to the family home was made in the early 1970s. Later a number of small sheds or "bunkers" were built for more room. If there was not enough food, she would simply go fishing herself and catch a meal. The cottage was a "home", a safe place, in its truest sense to several generations of the family, the extended family and anyone in need.

The cottage is the symbol of Nanny Ferguson and her legacy which continues to be held in high esteem within the community of Coffs Harbour and Aboriginal people from wider afield who were embraced by Nanny Ferguson's generosity. Today, the good relations and respect nurtured by Nanny Ferguson continues within the community of Coffs Harbour. Her legacy remains in the values that Nanny Ferguson instilled in her family and extended family and demonstrated to the community at large. It remains in the cohesiveness of the Aboriginal community in Coffs Harbour.

The building also has an important association with the maintenance of a significant public work, the Coffs Harbour, which was initiated under the eminent Public Works engineer Ernest de Burgh who as Chief Engineer for Harbours and Water Supply (1909 - 1927), was in charge of the Coffs Harbour Improvement Works.

In 2005, the Ferguson family faced the prospect of eviction from the property amidst concerns the state government wanted to demolish the cottage. As a result, the Coffs Harbour and District Aboriginal Land Council sought a preservation order on the property. It was subsequently added to the State Heritage Register in November 2009, becoming what was reported to be the "first building of Aboriginal importance" to be added to the register.

== Description ==
The cottage is a small weatherboard building, with additions to the rear and an iron roof with a front veranda approximately 5m by 2m. The house structure sits on the original sleepers while the back section has some areas of added concrete flooring approximately 50 metre areas timber on ground (sand).

The front section of the house consists of the original 2 rooms, the original kitchen. The lining of the walls are made of old horse hair.

There have been some modifications to the kitchen area for safety reasons including new electrical wiring. The back section has been modified slightly with an additional room added, where the toilet and wash area is.

Further modifications to the back section include the connection of coldwater to the back laundry area via the old copper piping that existed. The original roofing was replaced c. 2002 with the same fabric of corrugated iron.

The verandah boards were replaced and painted in October 2004.

The building was reported to be in extremely poor condition as at 22 December 2004. The structure is built from hard wood, and remains on the original sleepers which are in need of replacement. The front roof section replaced second hand iron.

The area where the cottage is located has potential for further archaeological research due to its significant location on the headland which was a ceremonial site. Previous archaeological studies have identified many sites within close vicinity of the cottage.

The family have requested to repaint the roof with the Aboriginal flag as the original roof once had.

As a building, it is small and unpretentious. But as a symbol to the Aboriginal community and many individuals it is beyond price because of the life a very special person who lived there and the legacy she left for both the Aboriginal and white communities.

== Heritage listing ==
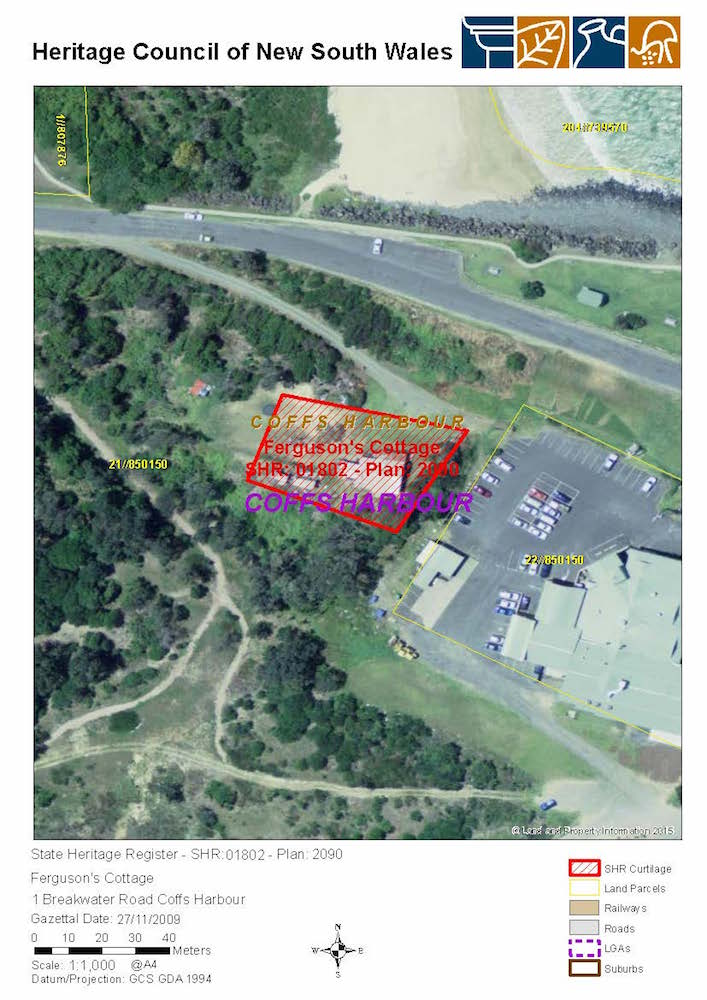
Heritage boundaries

Ferguson's Cottage, as the home of Nanny Ferguson and the heart of her community work, is of historic, social and cultural significance for the local Coffs Harbour Aboriginal community and also for many Aboriginal people in the North coast region and beyond as it symbolises a legacy of reconciliation and the deepening of Aboriginal European understanding that was brought about by the tireless efforts of Evelyn "Nanny" and Andrew Ferguson during the 1950s and the 1960s.

The Fergusons' work in dealing with the social pressures and racism impacting on the Aboriginal community of Coffs Harbour and the north coast; their position as role models for employment within the Aboriginal community and their work mediating with local and state government authorities, was integral to the acceptance of cultural relationships between Aboriginal and white people during a time when Aboriginal people were not widely accepted within the European community. The Fergusons' achievements in cross cultural relations, was acknowledged and accepted throughout the region and is one "symbolic" example of similar improvements (albeit small and slow) in community relations in NSW.

Ferguson's Cottage was seen as a safe haven for many Aboriginal people either from the community or on those passing through Coffs Harbour while travelling up and down the coast. Nanny Ferguson was a fighter for law and order among her own people and insisted that the Welfare protect the Aboriginal children and defend their rights.

Today Ferguson's Cottage is held in high regard by the Aboriginal and white community as it represents the "place" where reconciliation began for Coffs Harbour. Generations of the Ferguson's continue to reside in the cottage, and today the legacy is still carried on by members of the Ferguson family.

The building was originally constructed as a site office for the staged construction and maintenance of a major piece of Public Works Department (PWD) infrastructure, the South Coffs Harbour breakwater initiated by prominent Public Works Engineer, EM de Burgh. As PWD construction buildings such as Ferguson's Cottage were usually demolished or relocated at completion of works it is notable that the cottage, due to its use by the Ferguson family, still sits on its original sleeper sub-structure and is thus significant as a rare surviving example of a temporary site office constructed by the Department of Public Works. .

Ferguson's Cottage was listed on the New South Wales State Heritage Register on 27 November 2009 having satisfied the following criteria.

The place is important in demonstrating the course, or pattern, of cultural or natural history in New South Wales.

Ferguson's cottage is of heritage historic significance as it was the home of Evelyn Nanny Ferguson and the heart of the community welfare work. Nanny Ferguson's and her husband Andrew's achievements form a long term legacy of reconciliation and the deepening of Aboriginal European understanding during the 1950s and the 1960s in Coffs Harbour, the coastal region and beyond. The cottage itself is a symbol to Aboriginal people as a safe house and place where many could find refuge or guidance.

The current generation of the Ferguson family who still occupy the cottage continue to maintain Nanny Ferguson's legacy.

The place has a strong or special association with a person, or group of persons, of importance of cultural or natural history of New South Wales's history.

Ferguson's cottage is significant for it was associated with Evelyn "Nanny" Ferguson who was an exceptional lady within the Aboriginal and white community both locally, regionally and beyond. During the 1950s and 1960s Nanny Ferguson was the voice for Aboriginal people on issues relating to the social pressures and racism impacting on the Aboriginal Community of Coffs Harbour and the North coast. Nanny Ferguson tirelessly dealt with the Welfare and other state and local government departments on the unnecessary removal of children from their families and defended children's rights. Nanny Ferguson was a pioneer in encouraging Aboriginal people to gain the best possible education and engaged in facilitating cross-cultural mixing through the church and her broader social and work network. The Fergusons' achievements in cross cultural relations, was acknowledged and accepted throughout the region and is one "symbolic" example of similar improvements in community's in NSW.

The heritage significance of the cottage is also enhanced through its association with the staged construction and maintenance of an important piece of PWD infrastructure, the South Coffs Harbour breakwater which was originally designed by eminent Public Works engineer EM de Burgh.

The place has a strong or special association with a particular community or cultural group in New South Wales for social, cultural or spiritual reasons.

The cottage is socially significant to the Coffs Harbour Aboriginal community, Gumbular Julip Elders organisation and many other individuals in the coastal region and throughout the State, both Aboriginal and non-Aboriginal, who have fond memories of the cottage. The house is important to the local, regional and wider Aboriginal community's sense of place as Ferguson's Cottage was a place of security, a safe house, a place where a bed, a meal and assistance for Aboriginal people dealing with the European beau racy was assured in difficult times. What happened at Ferguson's Cottage while it was Nanny Ferguson's home, was an ongoing expression of the cultural and social values held by Aboriginal people for many years.

Today Ferguson's Cottage is held in high regard by the Aboriginal and white community as it represents the "place" where reconciliation began for Coffs Harbour.

The place possesses uncommon, rare or endangered aspects of the cultural or natural history of New South Wales.

The cottage is significant as a rare surviving example of "temporary" construction office built by the Department of Public Works.

The place is important in demonstrating the principal characteristics of a class of cultural or natural places/environments in New South Wales.

The cottage represents the typical way of life of living for Aboriginal people. A small 2 bedroom cottage, which during the 1950s and 1960s had no electricity or lighting and yet housed up to 15 children and half a dozen adults or more including family, extended family members, other family members or anyone who needed shelter. Ferguson's cottage is outstanding because it retains its high integrity within the community as a safe house and it represents the tireless efforts of Nanny Ferguson who brought salvation for Aboriginal people and closed the gap between the Aboriginal and white communities. The cottage is also a representative and rare surviving example of a temporary site office constructed by the Department of Public Works.
