= Coramba Nature Reserve =

Protected area in New South Wales, Australia

- IUCN category IV (habitat/species management area)
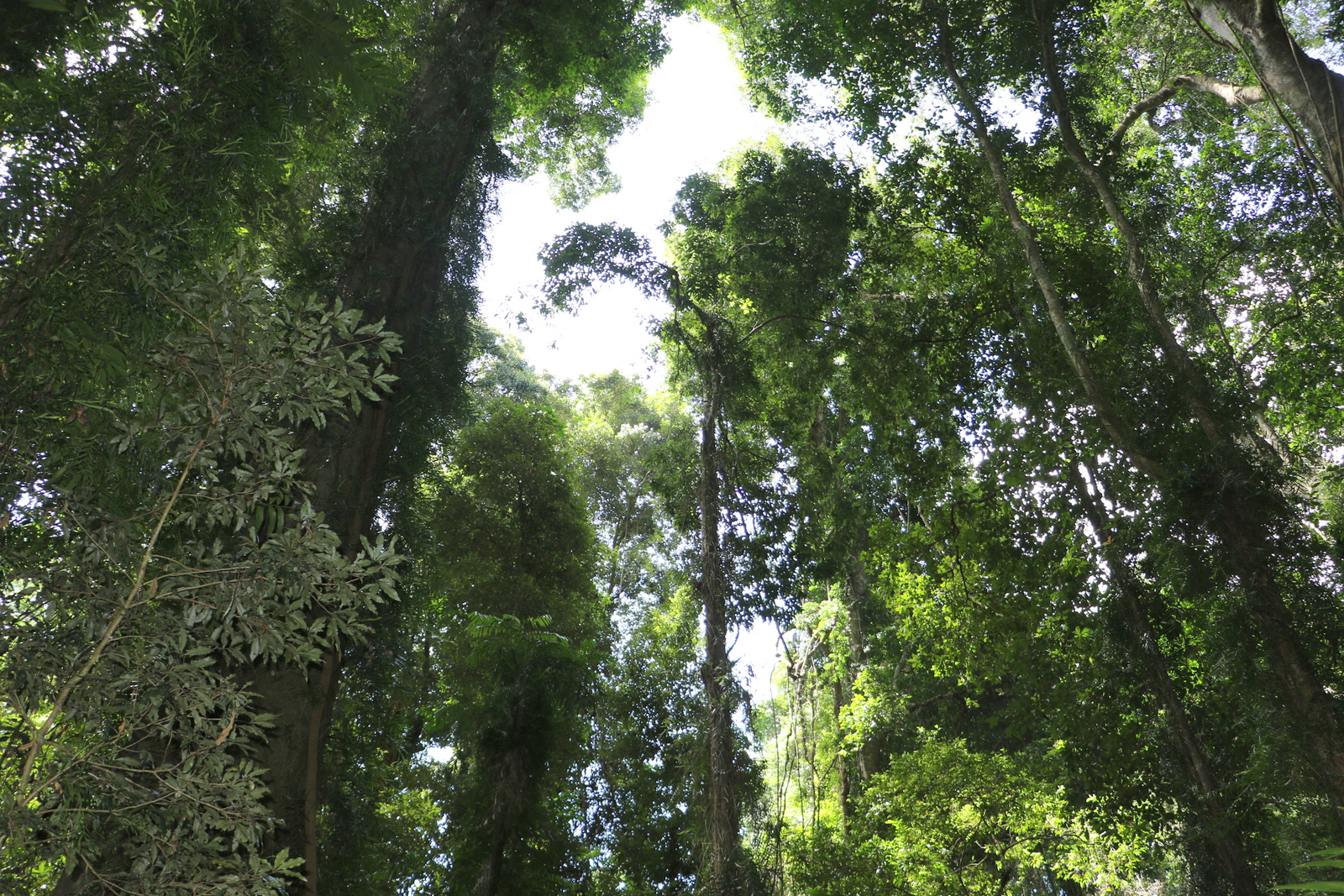
- Coramba sub tropical rainforest

- Location within New South Wales
- Location: New South Wales
- Nearest city: Coffs Harbour
- Coordinates: 30°11′57.71″S 153°1′8.34″E
- Area: 9.43 ha (23.3 acres)
- Governing body: NSW National Parks & Wildlife Service
- Website: http://www.environment.nsw.gov.au/resources/nature/CorambaNRpom.pdf

Coramba Nature Reserve is a protected nature reserve located near Coffs Harbour in the Mid North Coast region of New South Wales, Australia. It is one of the few remnants of low altitude sub tropical rainforest in the Clarence River valley. Founded in 1982 with the primary goal of protecting the remaining lowland rainforests.

Common tree species include white booyong, Oliver's sassafras, jackwood, white walnut, red cedar, black apple, white cedar, yellow carabeen, water gum, and maiden's blush.

== See also ==
- Protected areas of New South Wales
