= Lower Bucca, New South Wales =

Coordinates: 30°09′S 153°05′E

Lower Bucca is a tiny hamlet in Northern New South Wales, Australia. It is located North of Coffs Harbour on Bucca Road, off the Pacific Highway and in the City of Coffs Harbour local government area.

== History ==
Lower Bucca was the site of significant gold prospecting in the 1800s and remnants of old gold mining shafts exist in the forests around the old school. Susie Harden later Kaylock and Rudder (1892 – 1959), a notable local government official and community worker, was brought up on a farm near here.

== Decline ==
Lower Bucca Primary School closed in 1977 and was probably the last remaining landmark that defined the area. The school has since been converted to a community hall. An earlier and larger community hall (located at the intersection of McClellands Road and Bucca Road a few hundred metres east of the old primary school) fell into disuse around the same time that the school closed and was later demolished. In the late 1970s and early 1980s the old hall was the venue for community Christmas parties and dance nights.
