= Coramba, New South Wales =

Coramba New South Wales
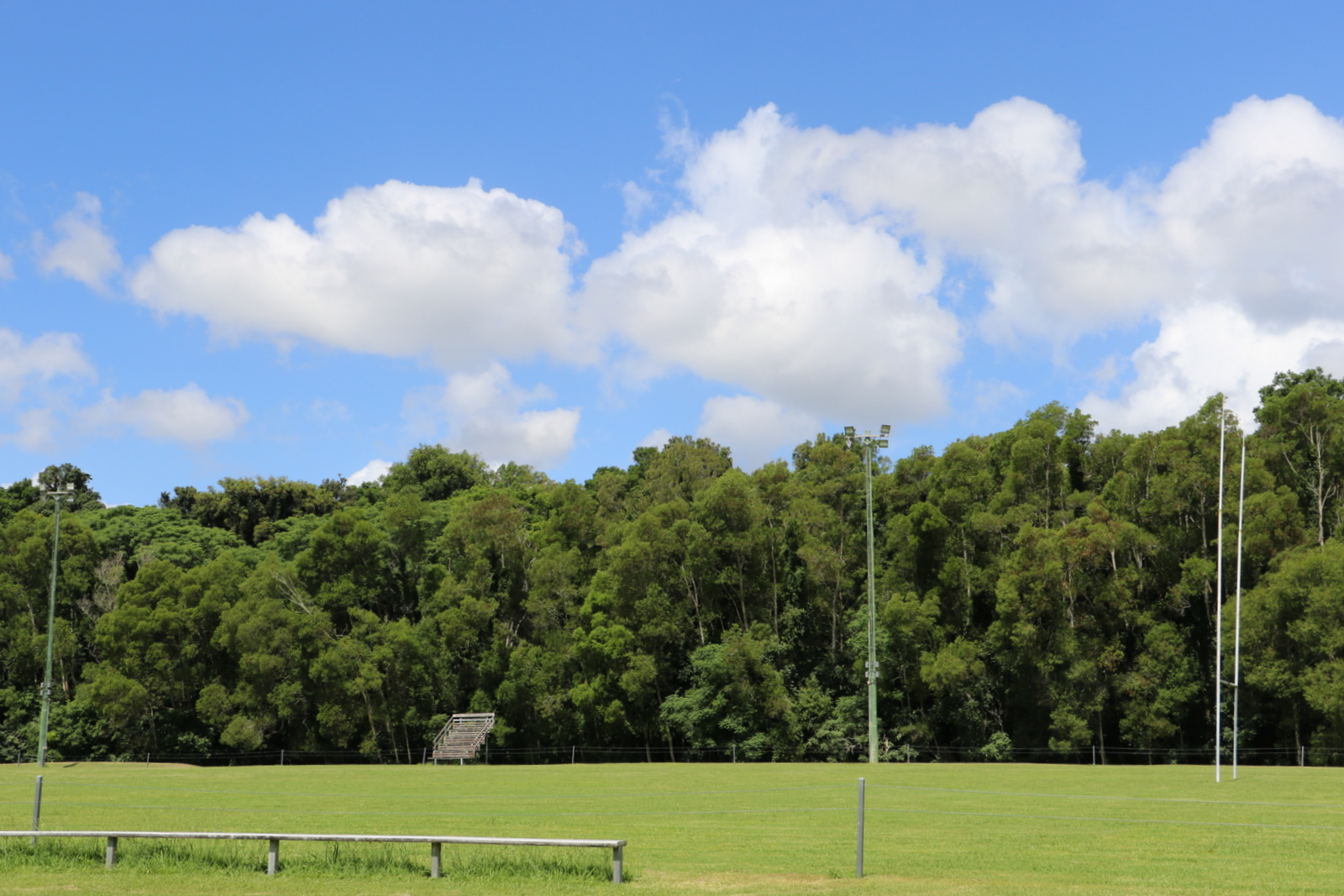
- Sports field and the nature reserve.

- Coordinates: 30°13′18″S 153°00′50″E
- Population: 817 (2021 census)
- Postcode(s): 2450
- LGA(s): City of Coffs Harbour
- State electorate(s): Coffs Harbour
- Federal division(s): Division of Page

Coramba is a small historic town north-west of Coffs Harbour in northern New South Wales, Australia. The North Coast railway passes through, and a now-closed railway station was provided from 1922.

In the 1890s, gold was mined in the area.

The village currently has a pub with accommodation, a post office, a petrol service station, a cafe/take away general store, a vet, two volunteer RFS fire brigades, an art gallery, a hairdresser, a fabric store/ haberdashery, a pre school, a historic community hall, and churches. Monthly street markets are held (weather permitting) or within the Community Hall in inclement weather. Coramba sportsground is home of the Orara Valley rugby league club which plays in the Group 2 competition. Coramba Nature Reserve protects the local sub tropical rainforest.

The community is serviced by the Coramba Public School.

Preceding station	Former services	Following station
Nana Glen towards Brisbane	North Coast Line	Karangi towards Maitland
