= Nana Glen, New South Wales =

Nana Glen
- Town
- Coordinates: 30°08′S 153°00′E
- Country: Australia
- State: New South Wales
- LGA: City of Coffs Harbour
- Location: 600 km (370 mi) from Sydney; 440 km (270 mi) from Brisbane

Government
  - State electorate: Coffs Harbour
  - Federal division: Page

Population
  - Total: 1,132 (2021 census)
- Postcode: 2450

Nana Glen is a small village in New South Wales, Australia, located 25 km inland north-west of Coffs Harbour in the City of Coffs Harbour. It is located on the Orara Way and at the juncture of two main roads, one leading to Lower Bucca. The Orara Way (formerly known as Coramba Road) is the main thoroughfare through the township and is an alternative route between Grafton and Coffs Harbour. Nana Glen is situated between the township of Coramba and Glenreagh. The local Mayor is Alison Johnson MD.

The film actor Russell Crowe has a 320 hectare property in Nana Glen, where his parents live, which as a result has become famous in Australia.

Archie Hunter Park, which is on the Orara River, is a place for a picnic and a swim.

== Name ==
Named after the two tailed lizard by Australian Aboriginals, "Nana" meaning two and because the Orara River and the Bucca Creek meet at Nana Glen, it resembles two tails where they fork.

== History ==
Historically a popular area for logging red cedar and other hardwoods.

Gold was mined in the area in the late 19th-Century and early 20th Century.

In November 2019, Nana Glen was affected by bushfires during the 2019–20 Australian bushfire season.

In February 2021, Nana Glen was the scene of a major derailment of a train carrying dangerous goods, with up to 16 carriages and two engines jackknifed in flood waters. This blocked the North Coast line for some time.

In May 2023, The Altar was expanded to include two sites, named after a local well liked community member.

=== Transport ===
A railway station on the North Coast railway existed between 1922 and 1974.

Preceding station	Former services	Following station
Glenreagh towards Brisbane	North Coast Line	Coramba towards Maitland

== Facilities ==
- Community Hall
- Preschool
- Primary School
- 25m Swimming Pool
- Cricket ground
- Tennis Court
- The Altar
- The "Limo" Altar
- General Store
- Pharmacy

== Education ==
Nana Glen Public School is located on the Mid North Coast of New South Wales 25 km west of Coffs Harbour in the Orara Valley. The school is set within a playground, which is one of the largest in the area along with full size soccer field, basketball court, fixed playground equipment a 25m swimming pool on school grounds and a large covered play area. The schools motto is "STRIVE TO ACHIEVE".

== Sports, Recreation and Equestrian Centre ==
Purchased in 1930 by the local community the Sportsground was donated to Council in 1979 on the condition that it be dedicated as a sports and recreation ground for the Nana Glen community. At the time, the ground was in poor condition with no power, water or toilet facilities. A celebration of the town's centenary provided the impetus to clean up the grounds and indeed develop them further. In 1980, a Community Management Committee was formed for the Care and Control of this facility. Since this time, the Committee has overseen the improvements to the Sports Centre with the community, federal, state and local governments and user groups contributing over $2,000,000 for its development. These improvements include erecting an amenities block, extending the Kiosk and amenities, building a dam and providing underground water, and substantial ground improvements including building stockyards, covered yards, cross country jumps and ring fencing. The field has stables and jumps where the local pony club and various gymkhanas and polocrosse matches are held.

== Annual Events ==
- Carols by Candlelight (December)
- Annual "Chase the Nana Race"
