= North Coast Football =

- Founded: 2005
- Country: Australia
- Number of clubs: 10
- Domestic cup: Australia Cup
- Current champions: Boambee Bombers (2019)
- Website: Official Website

North Coast Football is an association football competition on the north coast of New South Wales extending from Iluka in the north to Macksville in the south. The association was established in its current form in 2005, having previously been known as the separate entities of Holiday Coast Soccer and Clarence Soccer.

== History ==
North Coast Football was originally formed in 1980 under the name of the North Coast Premier League, and later Holiday Coast Soccer, but the name was changed in 2005, a period which also marked the evolution of a number of clubs into their current forms (for example, Korora became Northern Storm in 2003). The league currently contains over 5000 players, and is also home to the two largest clubs in Northern New South Wales, Coffs City United FC and Northern Storm FC.

== Clubs ==
There are 24 clubs in the region:

- Bellingen SC
- Boambee FC
- Coffs City United FC
- Coffs Coast Tigers FC
- Corindi/Red Rock Breakers
- Coutts Crossing FC
- Dorrigo Highlanders SC
- Grafton United SC
- Iluka FC
- Lawrence SC
- Macksville SC
- Maclean FC
- Majos SC
- Nambucca Strikers SC
- Northern Storm F.C.
- Orara Valley FC
- Sawtell & District SC
- Urunga FC
- Westlawn Tigers FC
- Woolgoolga United FC
- Yamba FC
- Yuraygir Bears SC

== Men's Honours ==
Season	Champions	Premiers	FFA Cup Best Performance
2005	Coffs City United Lions		
2006	Urunga Raiders		
2007	Coffs City United Lions		
2008	Coffs City United Lions		
2009	Maclean Bobcats	Coffs City United Lions	
2010	Coffs City United Lions	Coffs Coast Tigers	
2011	Coffs City United Lions	Coffs City United Lions	
2012	Coffs City United Lions	Northern Storm FC	
2013	Coffs City United Lions	Coffs City United Lions	
2014	Urunga Raiders	Coffs City United Lions	Boambee Bombers (NNSW semi-finals)
2015	Coffs City United Lions	Coffs City United Lions	Coffs City United Lions (NNSW Round 6)
2016	Coffs City United Lions	Coffs City United Lions	
2017	Coffs City United Lions	Coffs City United Lions	
2018	Boambee Bombers	Boambee Bombers	
2019	Boambee Bombers	Boambee Bombers	
2020	Boambee Bombers	Coffs City United Lions	
2021	Cancelled due to Covid	Coffs City United Lions	
2022	Coffs City United Lions	Coffs City United Lions	
2023	Woolgoolga United FC	Northern Storm FC	
2024	Northern Storm FC	Woolgoolga United FC	
2025	Coffs City United Lions	Woolgoolga United FC	
2026	Woolgoolga United FC	Woolgoolga United FC	
