= Coffs Harbour =

- City
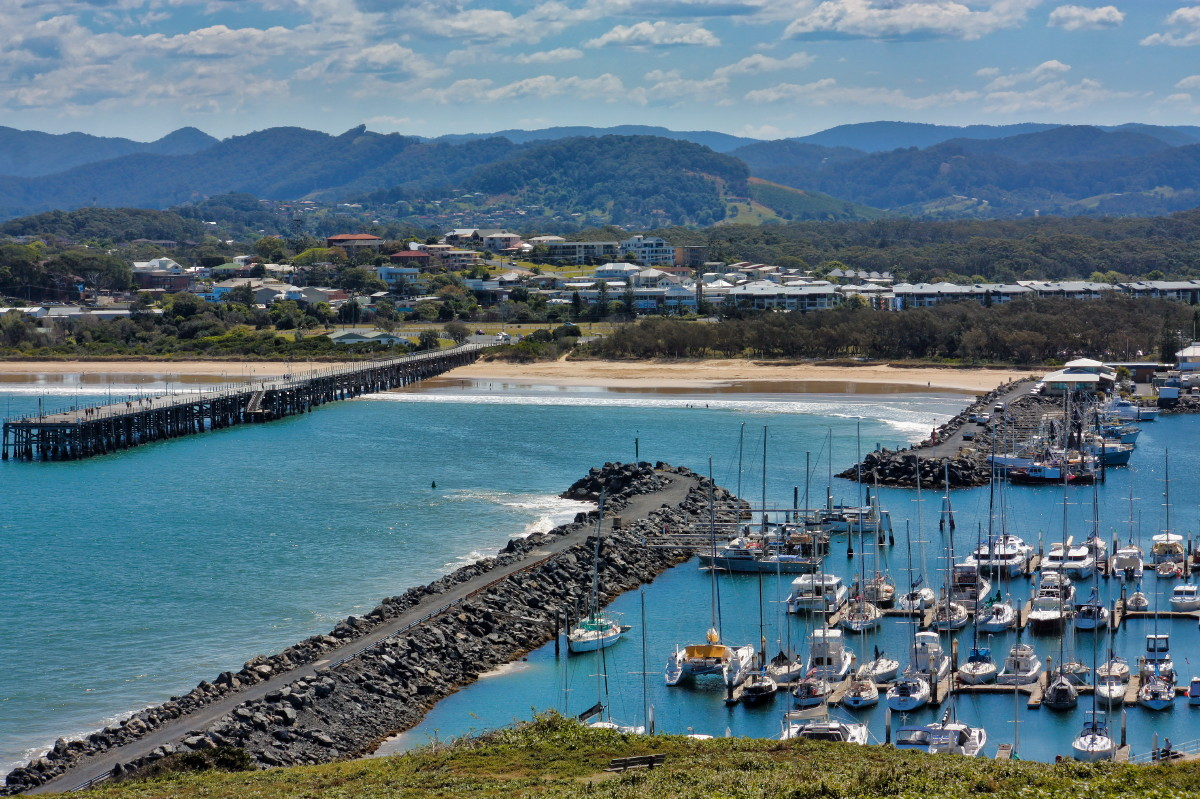
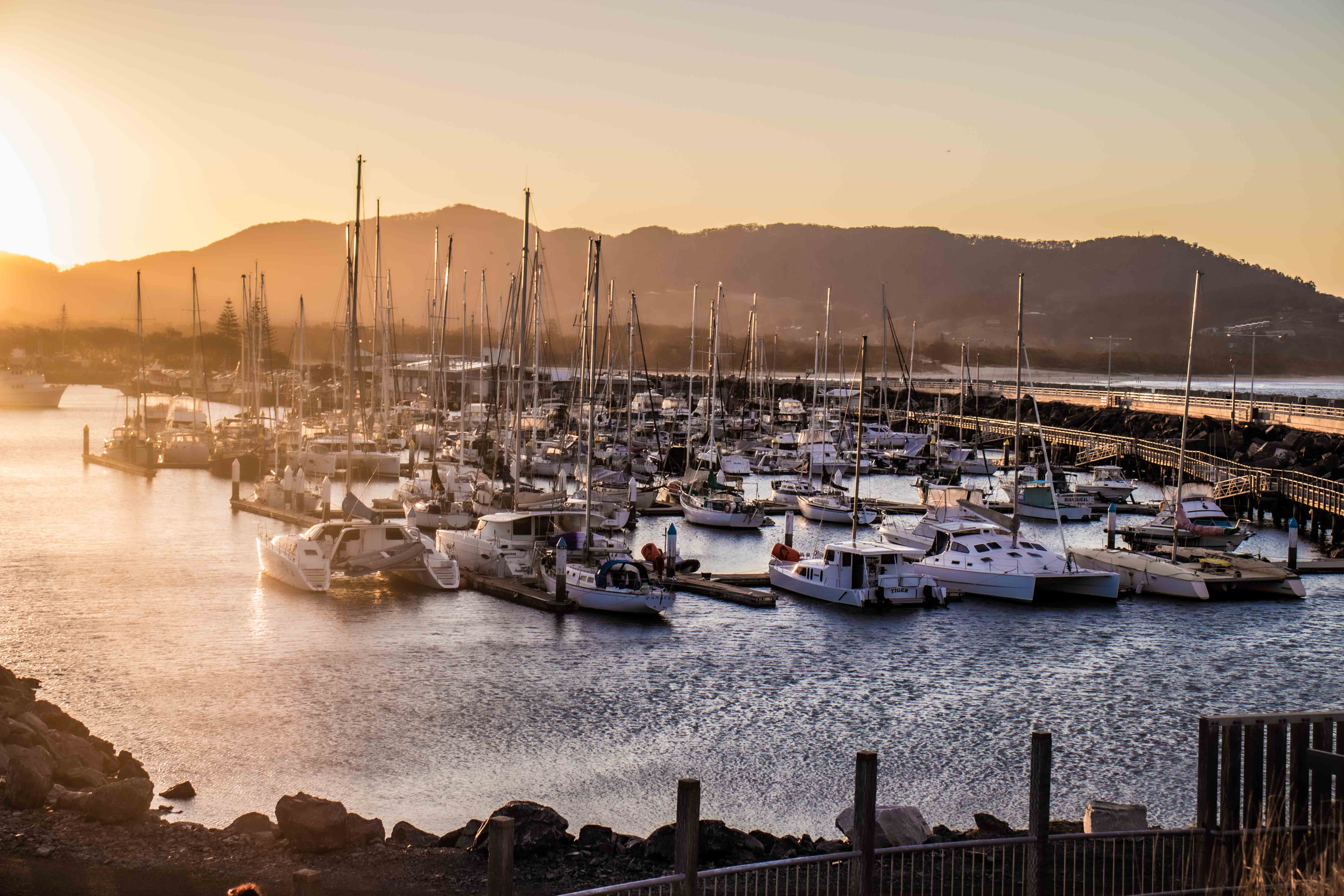
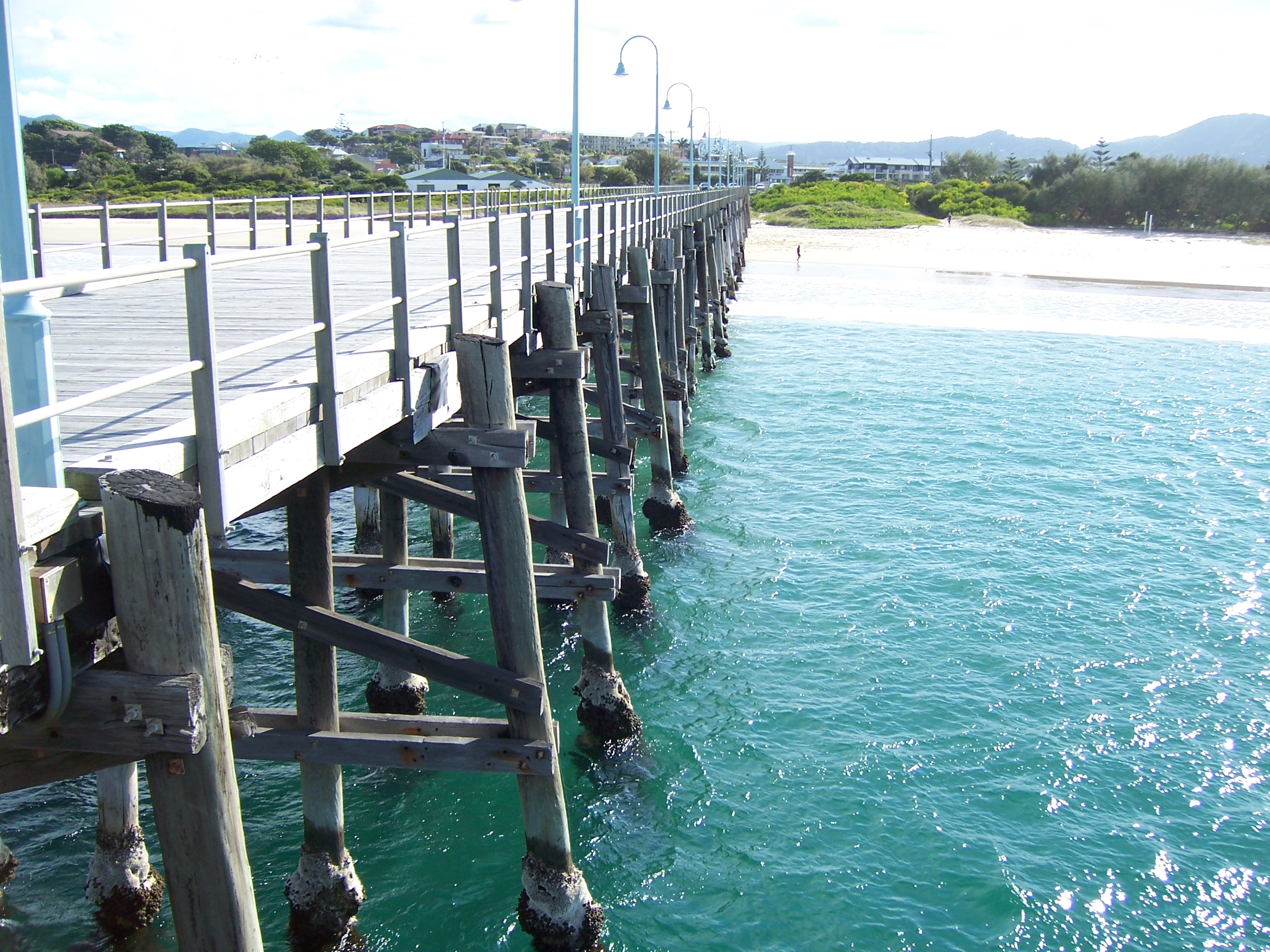
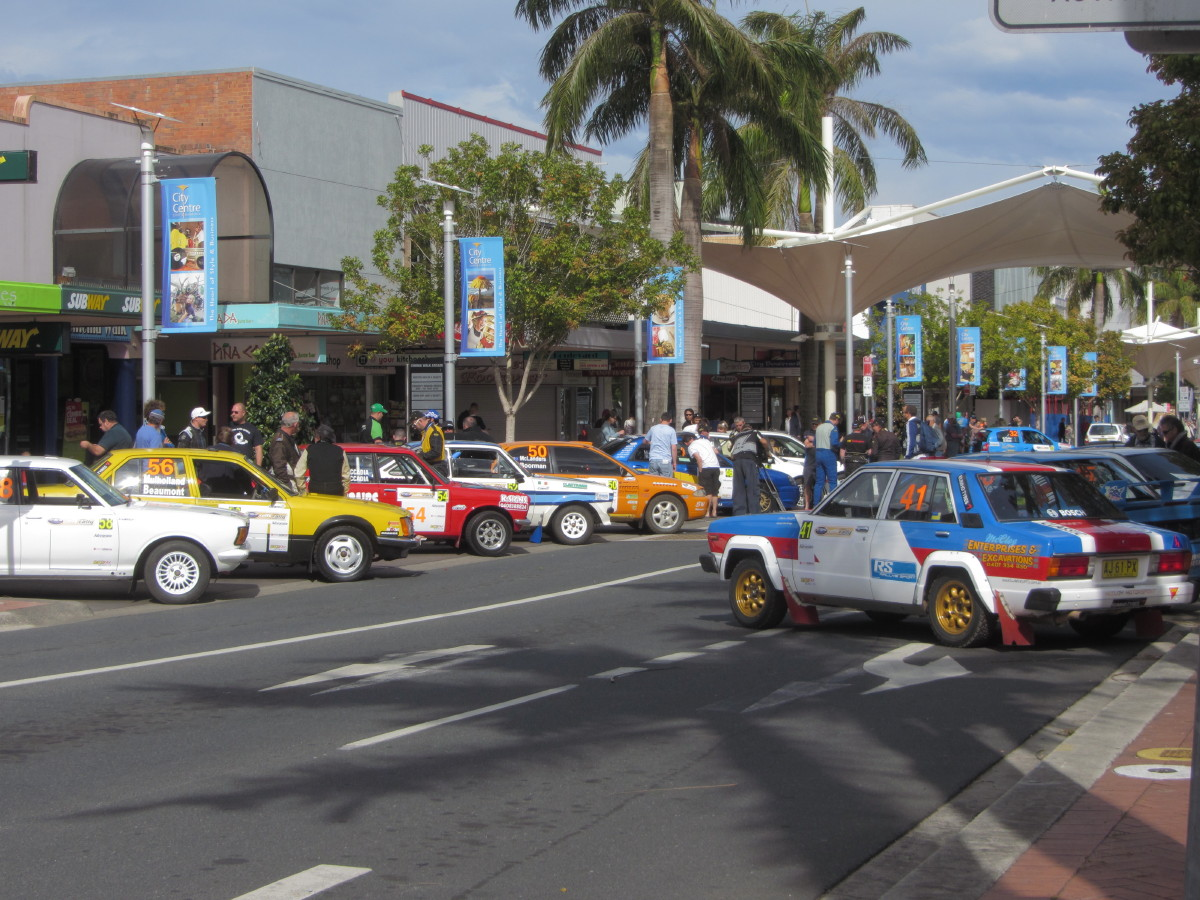
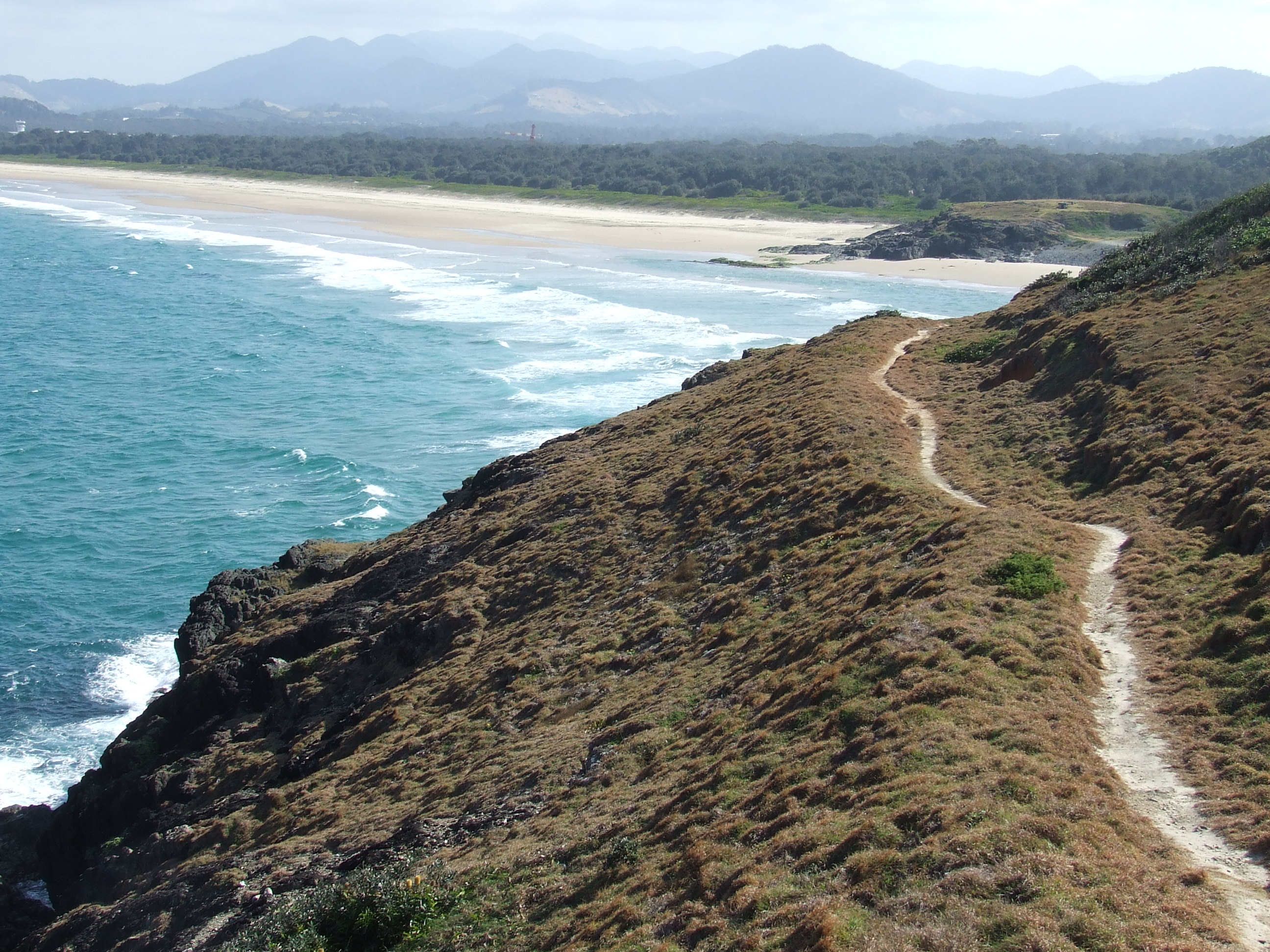
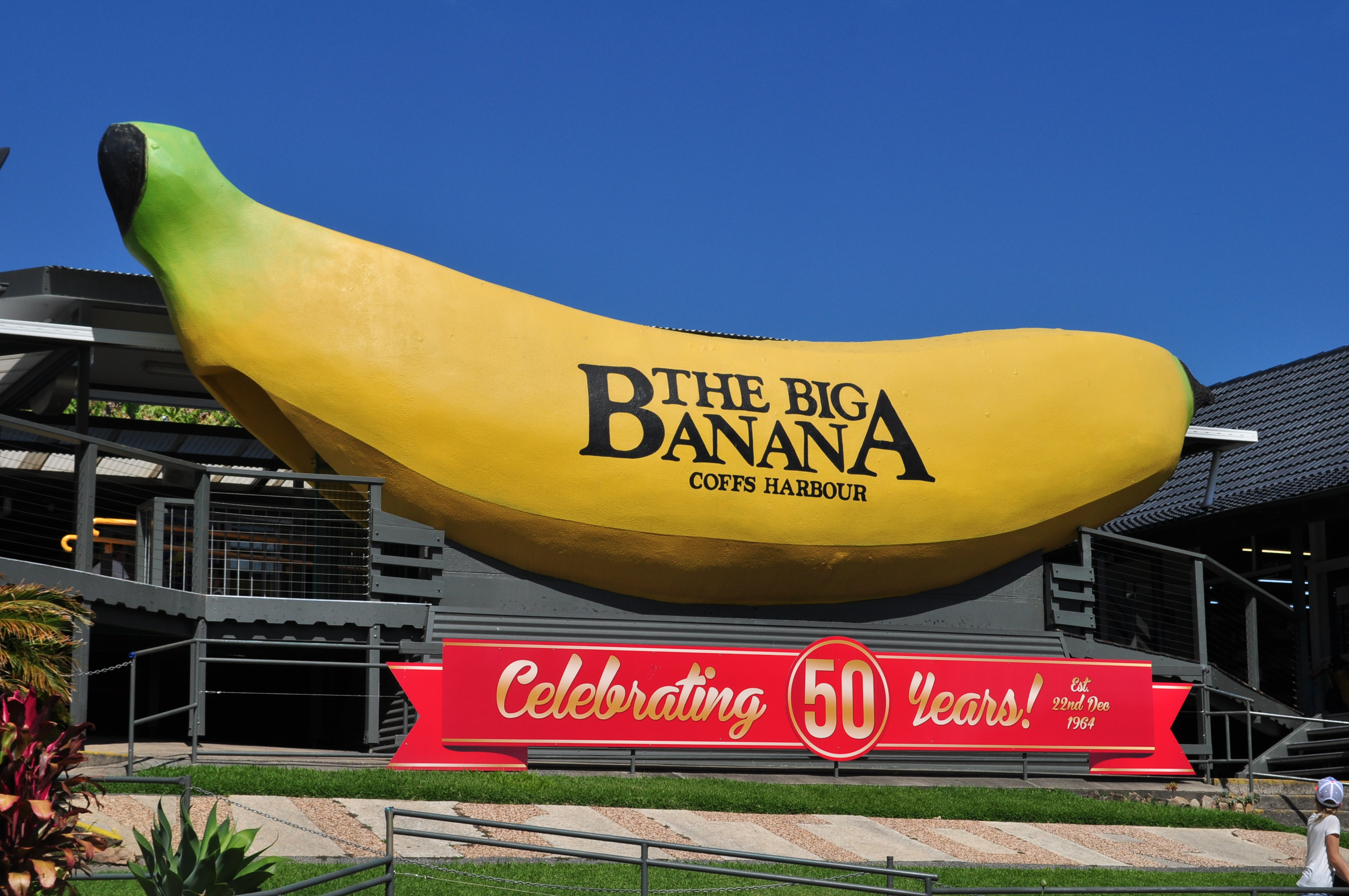
- Marina Bay, 2012 Marina at sunset, 2020 Coffs Harbour Jetty, 2006 City Centre, 2012 Harbour South Wall quarry, 2007 The Big Banana, 2012

- Coordinates: 30°18′08″S 153°07′08″E
- Country: Australia
- State: New South Wales
- Region: Mid North Coast
- LGA: City of Coffs Harbour
- Location: 540 km (340 mi) N of Sydney; 390 km (240 mi) S of Brisbane; 391 km (243 mi) N of Newcastle; 190 km (120 mi) E of Armidale; 82 km (51 mi) SSE of Grafton
- Established: 1870s 1 September 1987 (city)

Government
  - State electorate: Coffs Harbour
  - Federal division: Cowper

Area
  - Total: 505.5 km^{2} (195.2 sq mi)
- Elevation: 21 m (69 ft)

Population
  - Total: 78,759 (2021 census) (25th)
  - Density: 155.804/km^{2} (403.53/sq mi)
- Postcode: 2450
- County: Fitzroy
- Mean max temp: 23.4 °C (74.1 °F)
- Mean min temp: 14.0 °C (57.2 °F)
- Annual rainfall: 1,699.0 mm (66.89 in)
- Website: Coffs Harbour

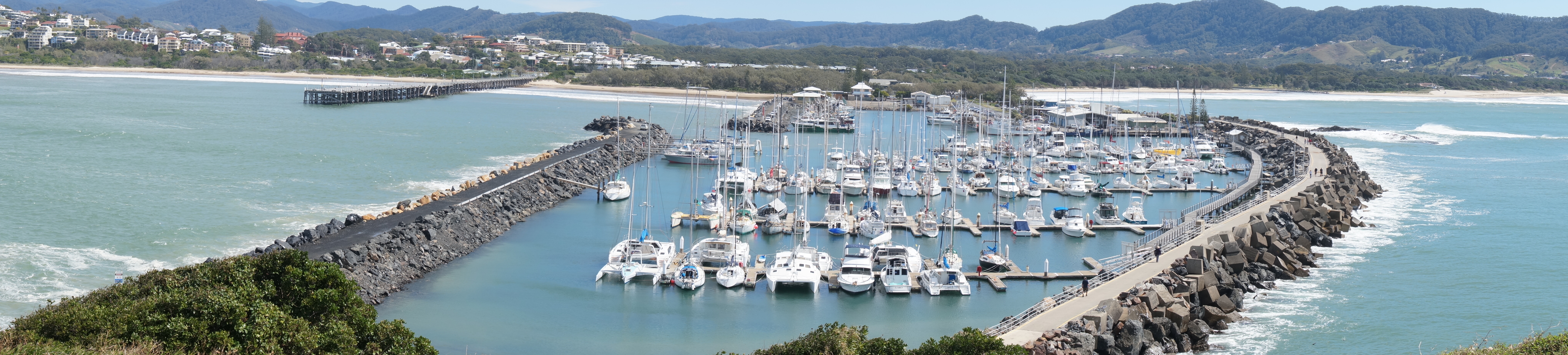
Panoramic view of the marina from Muttonbird Island, 2014

Coffs Harbour, locally nicknamed Coffs, is a coastal city on the Mid North Coast of New South Wales, Australia, 529 km (329 mi) north of Sydney, and 390 km (240 mi) south of Brisbane. It is one of the largest urban centres on the North Coast, with a population of 78,759 as per 2021 census.

The Gumbaynggirr people are the Traditional Custodians of Coffs Harbour and the surrounding area, and have lived there for many thousands of years.

Coffs Harbour's economy was once based on timber and agriculture. Over recent decades, tourism has become an increasingly important industry for the city. Once part of a region known as the Bananacoast, today the tourist city is part of a wider region known as the Coffs Coast.

The city has a campus of Southern Cross University, and a campus of Rural Faculty of Medicine University of New South Wales, a public and a private hospital, several radio stations, and three major shopping centres. Coffs Harbour is near numerous national parks, including a marine national park.

There are regular passenger flights each day to Sydney, Melbourne and Brisbane departing from Coffs Harbour Airport. Coffs Harbour is also accessible by road, by NSW TrainLink, and by regular bus services.

== Geography ==
Coffs Harbour is a regional city along the Pacific Highway between Newcastle and the Gold Coast. It has become a major service centre for those living between South West Rocks in the south and Grafton to the north.

Sawtell, 10 km (6.2 mi) south along Hogbin Drive from the city, has become a satellite suburb of Coffs Harbour, and is increasingly referred to as part of the city.

The surrounding region is dominated by coastal resorts and apartments. Hinterland hills and mountains are covered by forests, banana and blueberry plantations, and other farms growing macadamia nuts, cucumbers, and tomatoes. It is the only place in New South Wales where the Great Dividing Range meets the Pacific Ocean.

The greater Coffs Harbour city is broken up into several suburb and precinct areas, including:

- Red Hill
- South Coffs
- West Coffs
- Coffs Harbour Jetty
- Park Beach
- Sandy Beach
- Diggers Beach
- Korora, West Korora
- Sapphire Beach
- Moonee Beach
- Emerald Beach
- North Boambee Valley
- Boambee, Boambee East
- Toormina
- Sawtell
- Bonville

The city is surrounded by many towns and villages in the Coffs Coast region, including:

- Coramba
- Nana Glen
- Corindi Beach and Red Rock
- Karangi
- Ulong
- Upper Orara
- Woolgoolga

== History ==
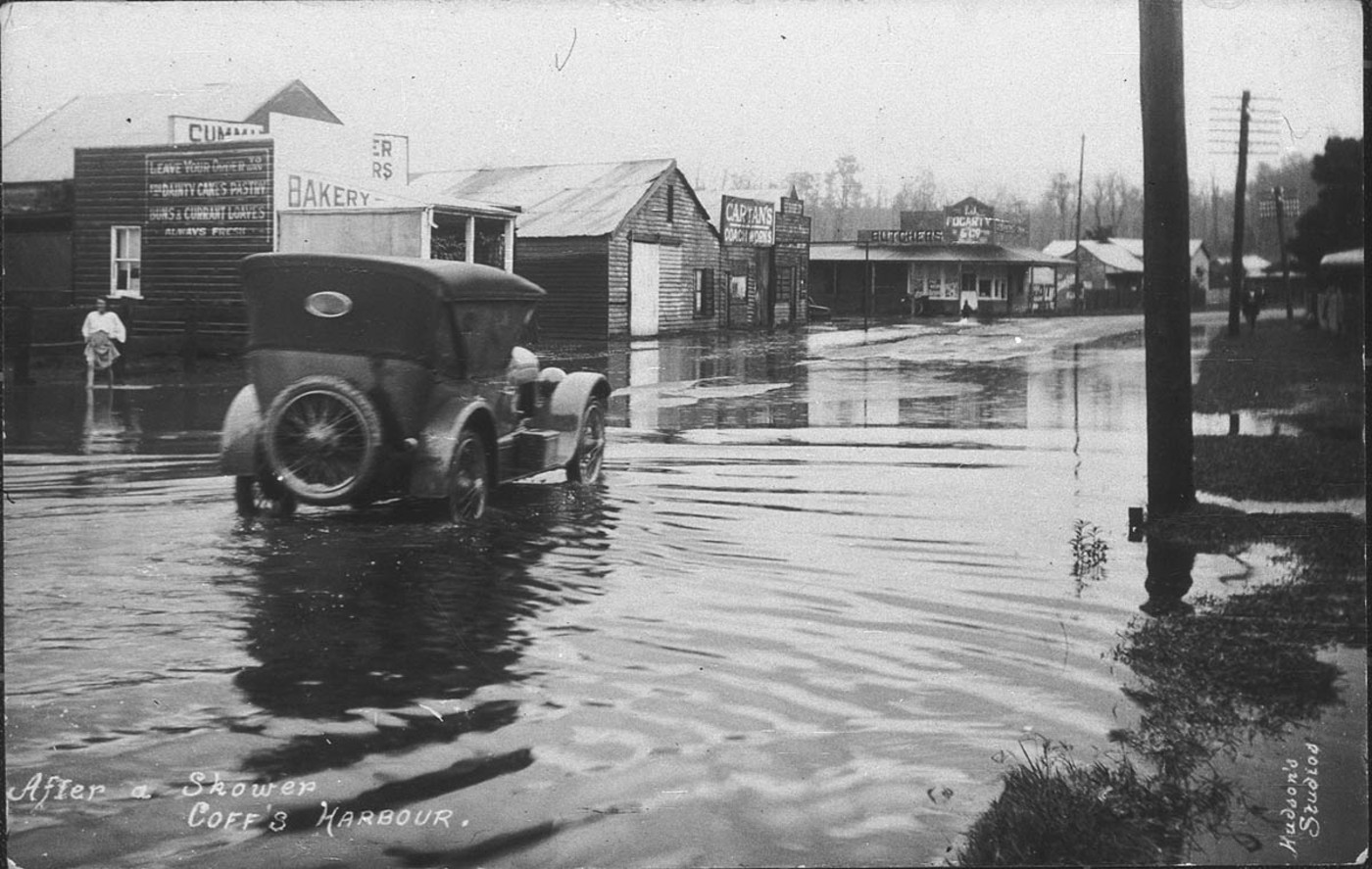
Looking west from Moonee Street after a shower of rain, 1922

The traditional inhabitants of the Coffs Harbour region are the Gumbaynggirr people, who have occupied the land for thousands of years, forming one of the largest coastal Aboriginal nations in New South Wales. Their country stretches from the Nambucca River in the south to around the Clarence River in the north and to the Great Dividing Range in the west.

By the early 20th century, the Coffs Harbour area had become an important timber production centre. Before the opening of the North Coast railway line, the only way to transport large, heavy items of low value, such as timber, was by coastal shipping. That meant sawmillers on the North Coast were dependent on jetties either in rivers or off beaches for exporting their timber. Timber tramways were constructed to connect the timber-getting areas and sawmills with jetties built into the ocean at Coffs Harbour.

== Origin of place name ==
The Gumbaynggirr language name for the harbour after which the town is named, is Gitten Mirreh which translates as "big moon".

Coffs Harbour owes its name to John Korff, a ship builder and ship owner, who named the area Korff's Harbour after he was forced to take shelter from a storm there in 1847.

The name was accidentally changed by the Crown surveyor when he reserved land in the area during 1861.

== Heritage listings ==
Coffs Harbour has a number of heritage-listed sites, including:

- 1 Breakwater Road: Ferguson's Cottage
- Coffs Harbour timber jetty, Jordan Esplanade

== Demographics ==
Historical population
Year	Pop.	±%
1954	6,215	—
1961	7,208	+16.0%
1966	7,683	+6.6%
1971	10,088	+31.3%
1976	12,197	+20.9%
1981	16,020	+31.3%
1986	18,074	+12.8%
1991	20,326	+12.5%
1996	22,177	+9.1%
2001	25,828	+16.5%
2006	26,353	+2.0%
2011	45,580	+73.0%
2016	48,225	+5.8%
2021	51,026	+5.8%
Source: Australian Bureau of Statistics data. Note: after 2006, the Coffs Harbour population expanded to included several neighbouring communities.

According to the 2021 Census the population of suburban Coffs Harbour is 78,759. This is an increase from 72,944 in 2016. 52.6% of the population is female in contrast to the national average of 50.7%. The average age is 43, which is higher than the national average of 38. Aboriginal and Torres Strait Islander people made up 5.6% of the population.

75.5% of residents reported being born in Australia; higher than the national average of 66.7%. Other than Australia, the most common countries of birth were England (3.2%), New Zealand (1.3%), Myanmar (1.1%), India (0.9%) and Germany (0.5%). 62.2% of residents also reported both their parents being born in Australia, considerably higher than the national average of 47.3%. 82.1% of people spoke only English at home.

The top religious affiliations in Coffs Harbour are Catholic 20.0%, Anglican 17.9% and Presbyterian and Reformed 3.9%. 29.3% declared no religion and 11.1% did not submit a response.

== Climate ==
Coffs Harbour has a humid subtropical climate (Cfa according to the Köppen climate classification system) with hot, wet summers and short mild winters, with marked seasonality of rainfall. The city is relatively sunny, receiving 122.1 clear days annually, higher than Brisbane and Cairns but not as sunny as Townsville. Summers are moderately hot, wet and humid. Winters are mild, albeit featuring cool nights, with light to moderate rainfall. There is a history of floods in the city, with major flooding occurring in the years 1917, 1938, 1950, 1963, 1974, 1977, 1989, 1991, 2009 and 2021.

In October 2021, Coffs Harbour was struck by an enormous hailstorm, which caused many people to be displaced.

Climate data for Coffs Harbour MO (1991–2015, extremes to 1943)
Month	Jan	Feb	Mar	Apr	May	Jun	Jul	Aug	Sep	Oct	Nov	Dec	Year
Record high °C (°F)	43.3 (109.9)	40.5 (104.9)	35.9 (96.6)	34.2 (93.6)	29.8 (85.6)	28.5 (83.3)	30.3 (86.5)	34.0 (93.2)	35.2 (95.4)	39.6 (103.3)	43.3 (109.9)	42.5 (108.5)	43.3 (109.9)
Mean daily maximum °C (°F)	27.4 (81.3)	27.1 (80.8)	26.1 (79.0)	24.1 (75.4)	21.6 (70.9)	19.7 (67.5)	19.1 (66.4)	20.4 (68.7)	22.8 (73.0)	24.0 (75.2)	25.1 (77.2)	26.4 (79.5)	23.6 (74.6)
Daily mean °C (°F)	23.6 (74.5)	21.8 (71.2)	22.1 (71.8)	19.6 (67.3)	16.7 (62.1)	14.5 (58.1)	13.6 (56.5)	14.5 (58.1)	17.1 (62.8)	19.0 (66.2)	20.9 (69.6)	22.3 (72.1)	18.8 (65.9)
Mean daily minimum °C (°F)	19.8 (67.6)	19.6 (67.3)	18.1 (64.6)	15.2 (59.4)	11.9 (53.4)	9.4 (48.9)	8.2 (46.8)	8.7 (47.7)	11.4 (52.5)	14.1 (57.4)	16.7 (62.1)	18.3 (64.9)	14.3 (57.7)
Record low °C (°F)	11.0 (51.8)	11.6 (52.9)	9.9 (49.8)	4.3 (39.7)	0.4 (32.7)	−0.6 (30.9)	−3.2 (26.2)	−2.7 (27.1)	1.9 (35.4)	3.7 (38.7)	6.5 (43.7)	7.4 (45.3)	−3.2 (26.2)
Average rainfall mm (inches)	176.4 (6.94)	231.1 (9.10)	223.4 (8.80)	148.4 (5.84)	155.9 (6.14)	116.9 (4.60)	73.7 (2.90)	67.5 (2.66)	48.5 (1.91)	101.1 (3.98)	179.5 (7.07)	142.8 (5.62)	1,668.2 (65.68)
Average rainy days (≥ 1.0 mm)	10.9	11.8	13.6	10.2	9.6	7.4	6.0	4.9	5.3	7.4	10.6	10.3	108.0
Average afternoon relative humidity (%)	67	69	68	63	61	58	54	52	57	61	65	66	62
Average dew point °C (°F)	18.6 (65.5)	19.0 (66.2)	17.6 (63.7)	14.8 (58.6)	12.1 (53.8)	9.6 (49.3)	8.0 (46.4)	7.8 (46.0)	10.2 (50.4)	12.8 (55.0)	15.1 (59.2)	17.2 (63.0)	13.6 (56.4)
Mean monthly sunshine hours	235.6	204.4	220.1	216.0	207.7	198.0	223.2	257.3	255.0	251.1	237.0	244.9	2,750.3
Source: Bureau of Meteorology

== Attractions ==
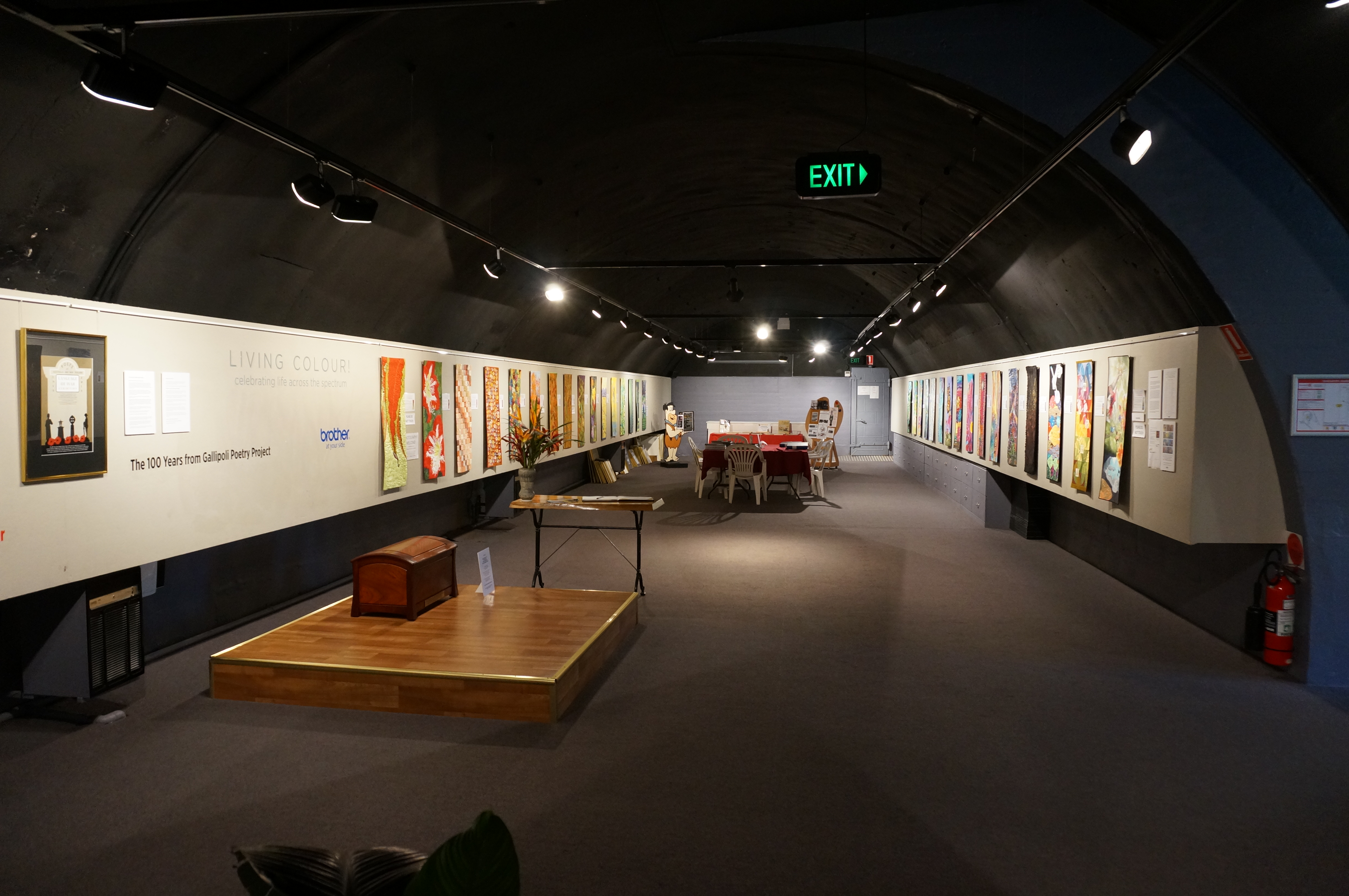
The Bunker Cartoon Gallery, 2014

Coffs Harbour was the hub of a thriving banana industry. One of the main attractions in the area is the Big Banana, one of the first of Australia's Big Things, which had its 50th birthday in 2014, and celebrates the region's best-known export. The world's biggest banana is part of the Big Banana Fun Park. There is also a popular underwater diving spot on a small natural reef.

The Coffs Harbour Jetty is an historically important timber wharf, which was formally used by coastal shipping to move timber from the hinterland. It was listed on the NSW State Heritage Register on 25 June 2021, recognising its significance "as the longest coastal timber jetty built by the Harbours and Rivers Section of the NSW Public Works department in the 19th century." The jetty area is being redeveloped by Property and Development NSW as a mixed-use precinct incorporating residential, cultural and public spaces.

Nearby, the Solitary Islands Marine Park preserves a diverse underwater ecosystem that mirrors the terrestrial biodiversity, covering the southern limit of northern tropical species and the northern limits of the southern temperate species. Muttonbird Island is accessible by walking along the breakwater from the harbour, with the nature reserve protecting a significant wedge-tailed shearwater breeding site. The Muttonbird Island footpath leads to a viewing platform where whales are often spotted between May and November.

There are many national parks, reserves and marine parks surrounding the city, including:

- Bellinger River National Park (west of Bellingen in the Bellinger headwaters)
- Bindarri National Park (20 km west of the city, near Ulong and Dairyville)
- Bongil Bongil National Park (south of Sawtell)
- Cascade National Park (north of Dorrigo)
- Coffs Coast Regional Park (beachside reserves and parks along the Coffs Coast)
- Dorrigo National Park (just south of the Dorrigo township)
- Hayden Dent Nature Reserve (northwest of Coffs Harbour)
- Junuy Juluum National Park (north of Dorrigo)
- Moonee Beach Nature Reserve (Moonee Beach-Emerald Beach)
- Nymboi-Binderay National Park (north of Dorrigo, east of Glenreigh, on the Nymboida River)
- Solitary Islands Marine Park (in the Tasman Sea from Coffs Harbour to Wooli)
- South Solitary Island (18 km NE from Coffs Harbour in the Marine Park)
- Ulidarra National Park (Bruxner Park and Mount Coramba area)
- Yuraygir National Park (stretching from Yamba to Red Rock and west along the Coast Range)

=== Screenwave International Film Festival ===
Founded by Dave Horsley and Kate Howat, Screenwave International Film Festival (SWIFF) took place annually from summer 2015/2016 in Coffs Harbour and Bellingen until April 2023. It ran in January until 2021, when it moved to April. The last festival took place in 2023, after which it was paused indefinitely. SWIFF also ran the Nextwave Youth Film Festival, Australia's largest regional youth short film competition, for filmmakers between 10 and 25 years. In 2022, Screenwave included a live music festival known as Storyland. Nextwave and Storyland were also paused indefinitely after 2023, along with Screenwave.

== Education ==
Coffs Harbour is home to the Coffs Harbour Education Campus (CHEC) which is a partnership between the Southern Cross University, TAFE and the Coffs Harbour Senior College. Other universities include the University of New South Wales Rural Clinical School located on the Coffs Harbour Health Campus. Australian Catholic University, Rural Education (REZ). Local state and private high schools include Coffs Harbour, Woolgoolga, Orara, Toormina, John Paul College, Coffs Harbour Christian Community, Bishop Druitt College and the Coffs Harbour Senior College.

Primary schools include; Boambee, Bonville, Coffs Harbour Public, Coramba, Corindi, Crossmaglen, Karangi, Kororo, Lowanna, Mullaway, Nana Glen, Narranga, Upper Orara, Sandy Beach, Sawtell, Toormina, Tyalla, Ulong, William Bayldon and Woolgoolga Public School. Private primary schools in the area include; Mary Help of Christians, St Augustine's and St Francis Xavier's.

Defunct primary schools

- Brooklana Public – 1920–1949
- Bucca Central Public – 1910–1963
- Bucca Lower Public (Formerly Bucca Creek until May 1919) – 1896–1978
- Corindi Creek Public – 1920–1962
- Timmsvale Public – 1928–1970
- Yalbillinga Special School (Amalgamated with Coffs Harbour PS) – 1965–1993

Other schools

- Giingana Gumbaynggirr Freedom School
- Casuarina School for Steiner Education
- Bishop Druitt College
- Coffs Harbour Bible Church School
- Coffs Harbour Christian Community School

Special schools are public schools designed for children or youth with chronic disabilities or who for other reasons cannot be accommodated in the comprehensive school system. Coffs Harbour Learning Centre is available for these students.

== Local media ==
=== Newspapers ===
- News Of The Area – Printed and on-line publications.
- Coffs Coast Advocate – The Advocate newspaper was until 2019 published on Wednesdays and Saturdays and delivered free to all homes. The newspaper is now online only. An online index of articles between 1993 and 2004 and selected articles dating back to 1900 is maintained by the Coffs Harbour City Library, though only articles relating to Coffs Harbour and its people are indexed.

Historical:

- Coffs Coast Independent – Weekly full-colour newspaper delivered free each Thursday to all homes in the Coffs Harbour district, closed 2012.

=== Television ===
- ABC TV, ABC Kids, ABC Family, ABC Entertains, ABC News (public broadcaster)
- SBS, SBS2, SBS Food, NITV, SBS World Movies, SBS WorldWatch (multicultural public and commercial broadcaster)
- Nine (NBN), 9Gem, 9Go!, 9Life and Extra (affiliate of the Nine Network, owned by WIN Corporation).
- Seven (formerly Prime7), 7two, 7mate, 7Bravo, 7flix, and Racing.com (owned and operated station by the Seven Network).
- 10 (formerly WIN Television Northern NSW), 10 Drama, 10 Comedy and Nickelodeon (owned and operated station by Network 10)
- News24 Regional (owned by Australian News Channel and News Corp Australia)

Of the three main commercial networks:

- WIN Television airs NBN News, a regional half hour long program including opt-outs for the Mid North Coast, every weeknight at 5:30pm. It is broadcast from studios in Newcastle with reporters based at a local newsroom in the city.
- The Seven Network (formerly Prime7) airs a half-hour local Seven News (formerly Prime7 News) bulletin for the North Coast at 6pm each weeknight. It is broadcast from studios in Canberra with reporters based at a local newsroom in the city.
- Network 10 (formerly WIN Television Northern NSW) airs short local news updates throughout the day, broadcast from its Wollongong studios, instead of its Hobart studios.

=== Radio ===
==== Commercial ====
- 2HC 639 AM and 100.5 FM – talkback, news – including local, national & international; sport; and music. Part of the Broadcast Operations Group's Super Radio Network relaying a majority of programs from 2SM in Sydney and 2HD in Newcastle. The station was purchased by Bill Caralis in 2005.
- Triple M 106.3 FM – Part of Southern Cross Austereo, Triple M has limited local content – with shows such as Moffee For Breakfast, as well as networked programming – like The Ray Hadley Morning Show, and The Marty Sheargold Show. The station was formerly known as 2CS FM until 15 December 2016.
- Hit 105.5 (105.5 FM) – Part of Southern Cross Austereo, Hit 105.5 has a local Coffs Harbour Breakfast Show called the A.B & Ben Show. It began in 1997 as a third commercial licence for the Coffs Coast. The station was formerly known as Star FM until 15 December 2016.

==== Government ====
- Triple J 91.5 FM
- Radio National 99.5 FM
- ABC Classic 97.9 FM
- ABC Coffs Coast 92.3 FM
- ABC NewsRadio 90.7 FM

==== Community ====
- CHY FM 104.1 CHY FM website
- Racing Radio 107.1 FM
- 2AIR FM 107.9 2AIR website

==== Narrowcast ====
- RawFM 88.0 FM

== Transport ==
=== Bus ===
The Coffs Harbour bus network extends from Grafton and Red Rock in the north to Macksville and Grassy Head in the south. Regular route services are operated by Busways and CDC. CDC also operate the Woopi Connect On Demand bus service in the Northern Beaches area.

=== Train ===
Coffs Harbour is served by NSW TrainLink. Two northbound and two southbound XPT trains stop at Coffs Harbour station each day.

==== Sawtell and Urunga railway station upgrades ====
Both stations are currently under planning, but will go start constructing new walkways for the disabled people, a new walkway upgrade and extension to both platforms. The 2 stations are undergoing a program organised by the NSW under the name of "The Safe Accessible Transport program."

=== Air travel ===
Coffs Harbour Airport is regularly served by Link Airways, Qantas and Regional Express. The passenger terminal is accessible via Hogbin Drive.

The Coffs Harbour Aero Club on Aviation Drive supports private pilots. Flying lessons and discovery flights, as well as air-work and charter flights are available from the club, which is also working closely with local high schools to provide flying training for students.

=== Road ===
==== Taxis ====
Local taxis are run by Holiday Coast Transportation and operate as 13cabs.

==== Coffs Harbour Bypass ====
The Pacific Highway runs through the centre of the city. As part of the Pacific Highway Upgrade, managed by the NSW government, work has started on the construction of a 14-kilometre (8.7 mi) deviation of the highway, including 17 bridges, three interchanges, and three tunnels through the ridge line. The deviation starts at Englands Road, runs west to Coramba Road, and joins the existing highway near Campbell Close and Solitary Islands Way, Korora.

The interchanges will be at Englands Road, Coramba Road and Korora Hill, specifically Bruxner Park Road, and James Small Drive in Korora Hill. Meanwhile, the Tunnels will cut through Roberts Hill (Mccans Road) Shephards Lane and Gatleys Road

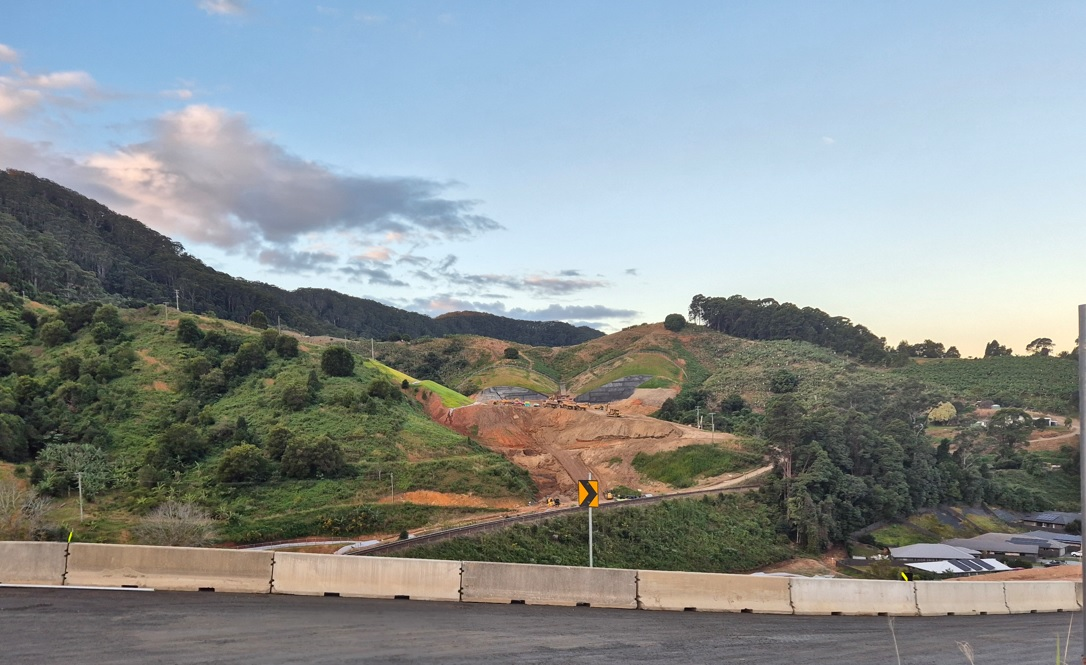
Bypass under construction, looking north looking toward the Shepards Lane tunnel southern portal, June 2024

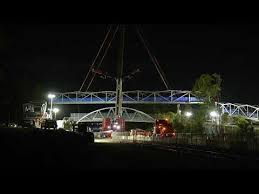
Installing the main span of the new Luke Bowen Pedestrian Bridge, October 2024

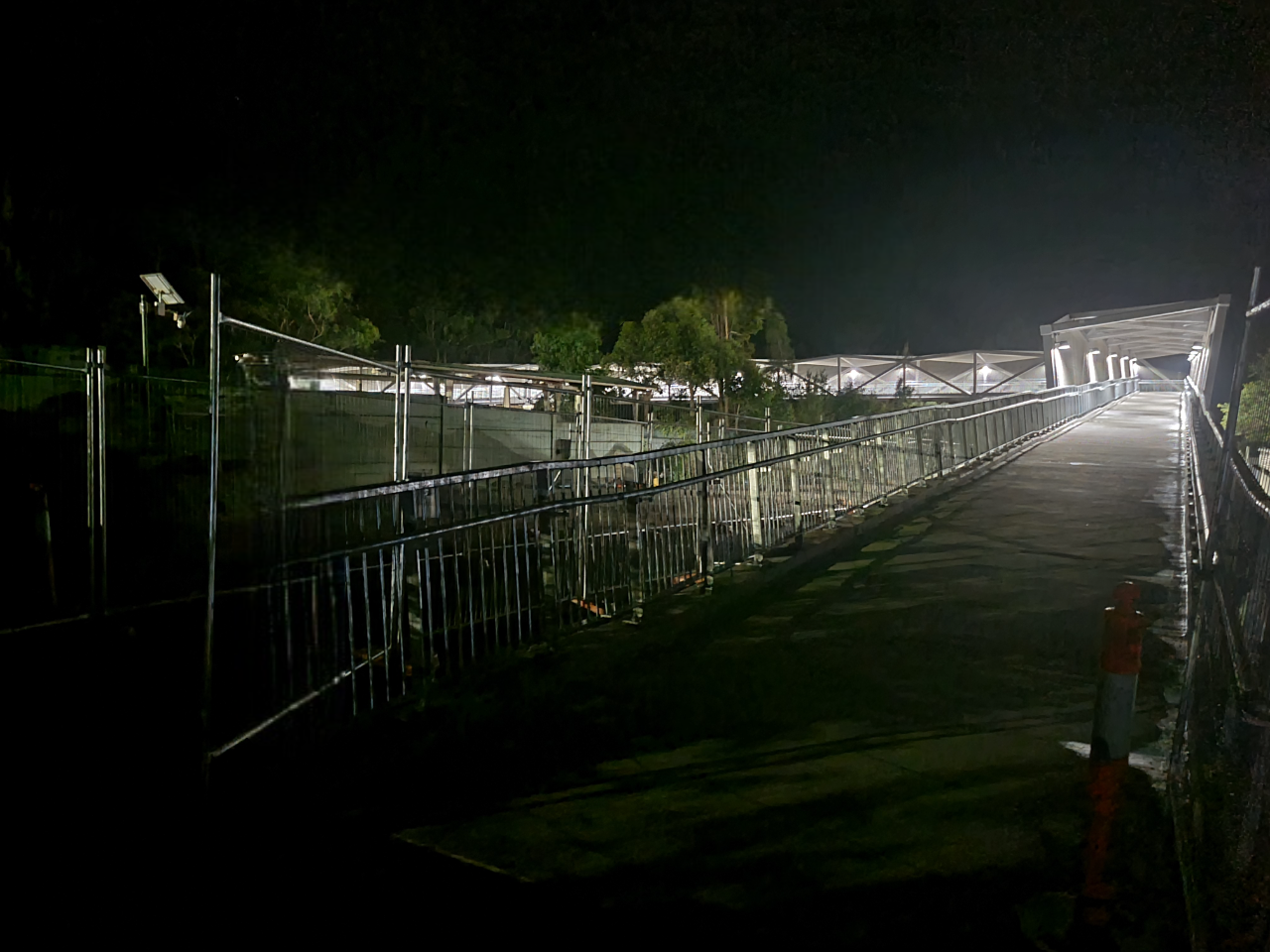
The newly opened Luke Bowen Pedestrian Bridge, 2025

The bypass is intended to save motorists up to 12 minutes of driving time, bypassing up to 12 sets of traffic lights, (14 including two new sets). However, trucks with hazardous chemicals (HAZCHEM) must use the existing highway for safety reasons.

The project was approved in November 2020, and the contract from the NSW Government was awarded to Ferrovial Construction and Gamuda Construction in June 2022. The project is due to be open to traffic in late 2026 and be completed in late 2027, at a cost of $2.2 billion AUD (US$1,387,386,000).

== Sport ==
The most popular sport in Coffs Harbour is rugby league. The city has four clubs in the Country Rugby League of NSW's Group 2 rugby league competition; Coffs Harbour Comets, Sawtell Panthers, Woolgoolga Seahorses, and Orara Valley Axemen. All clubs offer entries in age groups ranging from under-7s to first grade. The Sawtell Panthers are the current champions in first grade and under-18s, and Woolgoolga Seahorses were runners up to the Port Macquarie Sharks in reserve grade.

Rugby League Clubs in Coffs Harbour

- Coffs Harbour Comets
- Orara Valley Axemen
- Sawtell Panthers
- Woolgoolga Seahorses

There is a local Australian rules football competition with three clubs: Coffs Harbour, Northern Beaches–Woologoolga and Sawtell Saints.

There is also a men's and women's soccer league, two rugby union clubs (Coffs Harlequins and Southern Cross University), junior and senior basketball competitions and the representative Coffs Suns, field hockey and netball competitions.

In 2001, Coffs Harbour hosted the Oceania region's qualification matches for the 2002 FIFA World Cup. One these matches played at Coffs Harbour was the Australia 31–0 American Samoa game, which set a new world record for international association football's biggest-ever win.

Pacific Bay Resort hosted "Camp Wallaby" throughout the 2000s, in which the Wallabies called Coffs Harbour home.

The 2007 and 2013 City vs Country Rugby League representative fixtures were held in Coffs Harbour.

The city is home to the Coffs Harbour International Stadium, which has hosted FIFA World Cup Qualifiers and a Women's 2008 Beijing Olympics Qualification fixtures for the Matildas in soccer as well as some National Rugby League (NRL) pre-season fixtures and domestic one day cricket matches. Coffs Harbour is also known for a great place to skydive due to the hinterland views where The Great Dividing Range meets the sea.

The region has hosted international rallying through the 1970s through to the early 1980s. After that time, the events became part of the Australian Rally Championship and NSW Rally Championships. It was the host city for Rally Australia, a round of the World Rally Championship in 2011. The rally used roads from the neighbouring Bellingen, and Nambucca shires in addition to Coffs Harbour. The rally returned permanently to Coffs Harbour in 2013. In 2016, the rally was run in November with a Super special Stage at the Coffs Jetty. It was last held in 2018 after the 2019 edition was cancelled due to the Black Summer bushfires.

Coffs Harbour is home to three locally grown sporting events attracting thousands of competitors each year: the Coffs Harbour Triathlon (bcu Coffs Tri), the Coffs Harbour running festival and the Coffs Ocean Swims, all raising money to local children's charities.

== Notable residents ==
- Attila Abonyi – former Australian international Association football player who was capped 61 times for the Socceroos
- Kevin Bartlett – racing driver
- Liz Cambage – basketball player
- Russell Crowe – actor
- Jon English – singer-songwriter-actor
- Michael Ennis – rugby league footballer and sportscaster
- Kevin Gordon – rugby league footballer
- Clint Greenshields – rugby league footballer
- David Helfgott – concert pianist
- Deborah Knight – radio host and news journalist for the Nine Network
- Wendy Matthews – singer
- Mark McGowan – 30th Premier of Western Australia
- Luke Metcalf – rugby league footballer
- Emma Moffatt – triathlete, Beijing Olympics bronze medalist
- Tom Mooney – rugby league footballer
- David Mullane – rugby league footballer
- George Negus – author, journalist, and current affairs presenter
- Ben Newton – Paralympics gold medalist, wheelchair rugby player
- Melinda Pavey – NSW state politician
- Nathan Quinn – rally driver
- Dick Smith – entrepreneur
- Jack Thompson – AFI award-winning actor
- Clare Wheeler – soccer player for Australia

== Annual events ==
- National Touch League (March)
- "International Charity Football Match", proceeds go to Wesley Mission for local homeless youth
- Ella7s (Australia's largest Indigenous Rugby Carnival) (March)
- Coffs Coast International Buskers Festival (October)
- Harmony Festival (March)
- Rally Australia (November)
- STILL: National Still Life Award (November)

== See also ==
- Coffs Harbour and District Local Aboriginal Land Council
- City of Coffs Harbour
- Gumbaynggirr
