= Dwight (surname) =

Dwight is a surname. Notable people with the surname include:

- Dwight family, a New England family of American educators, military and political leaders, and authors
- Ed Dwight (born 1933), African-American test pilot and sculptor
- Henry Otis Dwight (1843–1917), American missionary
- Henry W. Dwight (1788–1845), American politician
- John Dwight (disambiguation)
- Justice Dwight, American visual artist
- Mabel Dwight (1875–1955), American artist
- Mary Dwight (born 1951), American college volleyball coach and former handball player
- Reginald Dwight (born 1947), birth name of Elton John, English singer, songwriter and musician
- Roy Dwight (1933–2002), English footballer
- Theodore Dwight (disambiguation)
- Thomas Dwight (1843–1911), American physician, anatomist, and teacher
- Thomas Dwight (politician) (1758–1819), American politician
- Tim or Timothy Dwight (disambiguation)
- William Dwight (1831–1888), American Union Army general during the American Civil War
- William Theodore Dwight (1795–1865), American Congregationalist minister
