= Dwight =

Dwight may refer to:

== People and fictional characters ==
- Dwight (given name), including a list of people and fictional characters
- Dwight (surname), a list of people

== Places ==
=== Canada ===
- Dwight, Ontario, village in the township of Lake of Bays, Ontario

=== United States ===
- Dwight (neighborhood), part of an historic district in New Haven, Connecticut
- Dwight, Illinois, a village
- Dwight, Kansas, a city
- Dwight, Massachusetts, a village
- Dwight, Michigan, an unincorporated community
- Dwight, Nebraska, a village
- Dwight, North Dakota, a city
- Dwight Township, Livingston County, Illinois
- Dwight Township, Michigan

== Other uses ==
- Dwight Airport, a public-use airport north of Dwight, Illinois
- Dwight Correctional Center, a maximum security prison for adult females in Illinois
- Dwight School, New York City
