= Vincenzo Galdi =

Italian model and photographer (1871–1961)

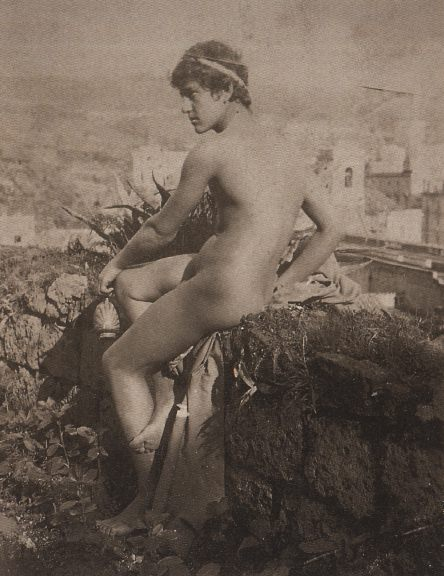
- Vincenzo Galdi photographed by Wilhelm von Plüschow in Posillipo, around 1890
- Born: 11 October 1871; Naples, Kingdom of Italy
- Died: 20 December 1961 (aged 90); Rome, Italy
- Citizenship: Italian
- Known for: Erotic photography
- Spouse: Virginia Galdi b. Guglielmi (m. 1902; died 1941)

Vincenzo Galdi (11 October 1871 – 20 December 1961) was an Italian model and photographer. Galdi is regarded as a pioneer in Italian erotic photography. He is known to be the first to break the taboo of depicting an erect penis.

== Early life ==
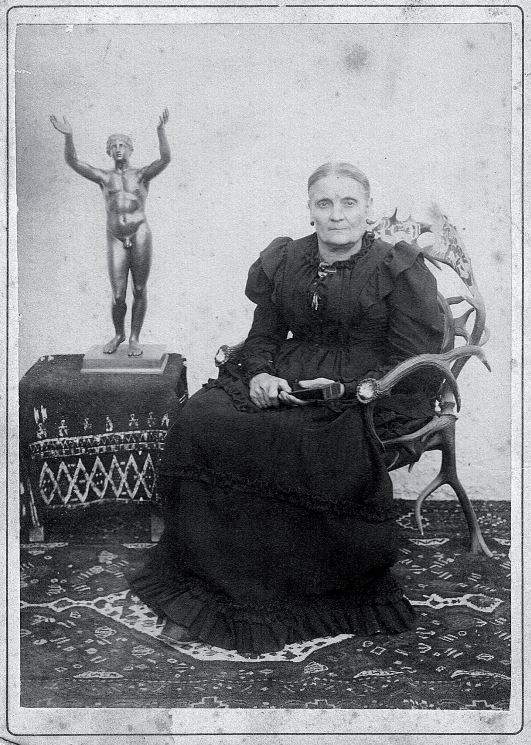
Rosa D'Amore, photographed by Vincenzo Galdi at the end of 19th century

Galdi was born in Naples on 11 October 1871. His father Vincenzo was a descendant of an ancient Italian noble house with the title of baron, one of whose ancestors was a Norman knight who participated in the liberation of Salerno from the Saracens. He belonged to a branch that, in the middle of the eighteenth century, had settled in Marigliano and had inherited the title of Castelan of Ischia and Procida, as well as Lord of Corleone in Sicily. Elder Vincenzo was a banker and owner of a hat factory. Vincenzo Galdi's mother, Rosa D'Amore, was the sister of the mayor of Marigliano.

== Naples ==
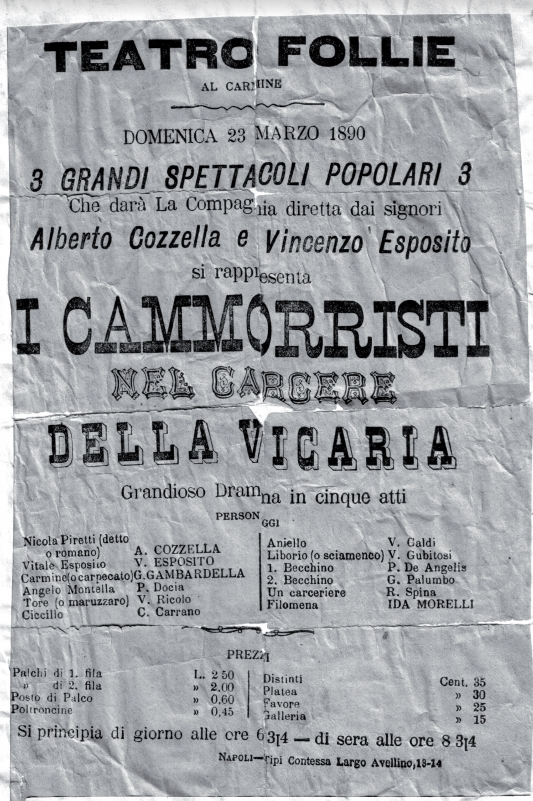
Poster of the show "I Cammorristi nel Carcere della Vicaria", in which Galdi played the role of Aniello, performed in 1890 at the Theater Folly of Naples

Vincenzo Galdi enrolled in the Institute of Fine Arts in Naples. During his studies he was especially impressed with optics and photographic technique, even building a wooden camera with a telescopic lens by himself. As a student he worked at the studio of Giorgio Sommer on Via Monte di Dio. He started to study with German photographer Guglielmo Plüschow, who had a studio in Naples in 1886 or 1887. As he was strikingly good-looking, Galdi also modeled for Plüschow at that time. Starting from 1887 and until 1890, the young Galdi also worked in theater as a set designer, instrumentalist and actor with Eduardo Scarpetta's company and then with Alberto Cozzella and Vincenzo Esposito. But the economic default of the former Kingdom of the Two Sicilies and the decline of Naples' art scene led Galdi to leave his homeland and move to Rome with Guglielmo Plüschow.

== Rome ==
When he arrived in Rome in 1890, Galdi bought a penthouse with a terrace on Via Sardegna 55 in the new Ludovisi district, still suburban at that time, where he was going to live with his older sister Eutilia. He opened a studio on Via Campania 45—not far from his apartment—specializing in feminine and masculine nude art, soon becoming the most well-known author of the time in that genre after von Gloeden and Plüschow. He also produced portraits, and some of his photographs were sold as postcards. The Via Campania studio also worked as an experimental art gallery.

When Plüschow decided to move to Rome around 1895 himself, he took residence in the same street as Galdi (at number 34). The two continued their collaboration, started in Naples. This fact is documented by a letter by Theodore F. Dwight, director of the Boston Public Library, sent in January 1896, in which he described his visit to the studio of the photographer:

"Plüschow was not present in person, but his assistant was and I was given every pleasure to see his collection, apparently without you expecting me to buy it. While we were talking, the beautiful Italian, with black hair and mustache, a rather vigorous build and wide shoulders, over the age of 24, who seemed anxious to be noted and acted as a master of the place? I asked and learned that it was Vincenzo Galdi, the model of many of our photos. [...]"

The partnership with Plüschow lasted probably until 1902, given that the following year Galdi moved his own studio to Corso Umberto 333, where he worked with two assistants: Pietro Magnotti and Enrico Simoncini. Among the photographs attributed to Galdi are a series of shots commissioned by English painter Robert Hawthorn Kitson, depicting Carlo, his young lover from Taormina, whom he adopted. The photographs bear the stamp of Galdi with the address of Via Sardegna 55 and are dated 1906.

In 1902, Galdi married Virginia Guglielmi (12 April 1885 – 24 May 1941), an elementary school teacher. They had three children: Ernesto Theodor (b. 1903), Vincenzo (b. 1904), known as Vincenzino, and Michelangelo (b. 1917).

=== Plüschow legal case ===
In 1902 Plüschow was charged with "solicitation to prostitution" and "seduction of minors" and had to spend eight months in jail. Another scandal followed in 1907, and in 1910, Plüschow left Italy for good and returned to Berlin. There are no extant documents that show the trial involved Galdi as well, but a letter of Edward Irenaeus Prime-Stevenson mentions "G."—a famous nude photographer in Rome—being arrested and sentenced for "outraging public morals" due to overly audacious photographs.

=== Naiads fountain controversy ===
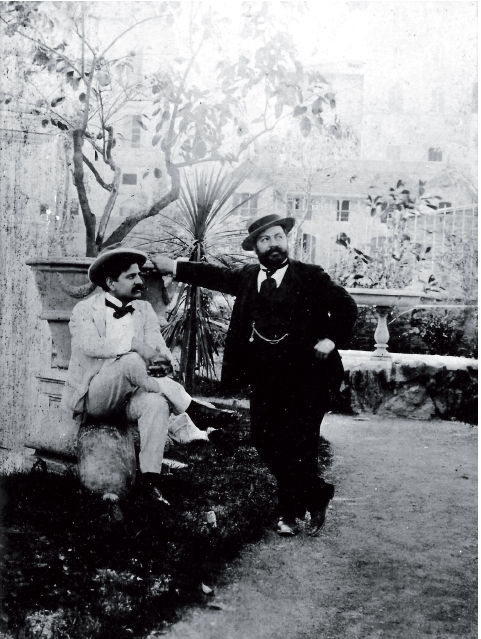
Vincenzo Galdi (left) and Mario Rutelli (right) outside the sculptor's studio in Via Margutta, Rome, 1901

When the sculptor Mario Rutelli was commissioned to renew the Naiads fountain on Piazza della Repubblica, he collaborated with Galdi. They met at a Masonic lodge to which both belonged. Galdi had just returned from Paris, where he visited a Rodin exhibition. Rutelli asked him to procure models and photographs for the project. Using Galdi's photos, Rutelli created nude sculptures that outraged conservatives. The city council responded by fencing off the fountain, though the situation resolved when students tore down the fence. The press was polarized, with Avanti! defending the work and L'Osservatore Romano condemning it.

== Later years and art dealing ==
Around the time Guglielmo Plüschow left Rome, Galdi abandoned photography and became an art dealer. He opened the Galleria Galdi in Via del Babuino, initially promoting futurist works by Giacomo Balla and Umberto Boccioni with help from Anton Giulio Bragaglia and his brothers. Protests followed, including broken gallery windows. The gallery moved locations several times before settling at Via del Babuino 180, where it remained until the late 1950s.

Galdi helped bring attention to artists such as Onorato Carlandi and Pio Joris. He was close with art historian Bernard Berenson, who learned macrophotography from him. Galdi's son Ernesto, who had poliomyelitis, lived with Berenson in Settignano during treatment. Despite liberal views, Galdi served on a National Fascist Federation panel on art forgeries.

== Death ==
Galdi died in Rome on 20 December 1961 at the Zappalà clinic. He was buried on 23 December at the cemetery of Verano beside his wife Virginia.

== Modern days ==
The gallery "Au Bonheur du Jour" in Paris held a solo exhibition of Galdi's works titled Galdi secret in 2011. In 2017, works were exhibited at Galerie David Guiraud in Paris alongside Wilhelm von Gloeden and Guglielmo Plüschow. His photographs were also shown in the 2009 exhibition Nude Visions – 150 Jahre Körperbilder in der Fotografie at Munich Stadtmuseum.

== Gallery ==
=== Photographs of Vincenzo Galdi by Guglielmo Plüschow ===
A very young Vincenzo Galdi in Plüschow's garden at Posillipo

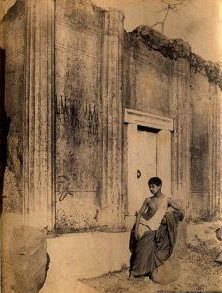
Vincenzo Galdi before a mock door on a Roman grave at Pompeii

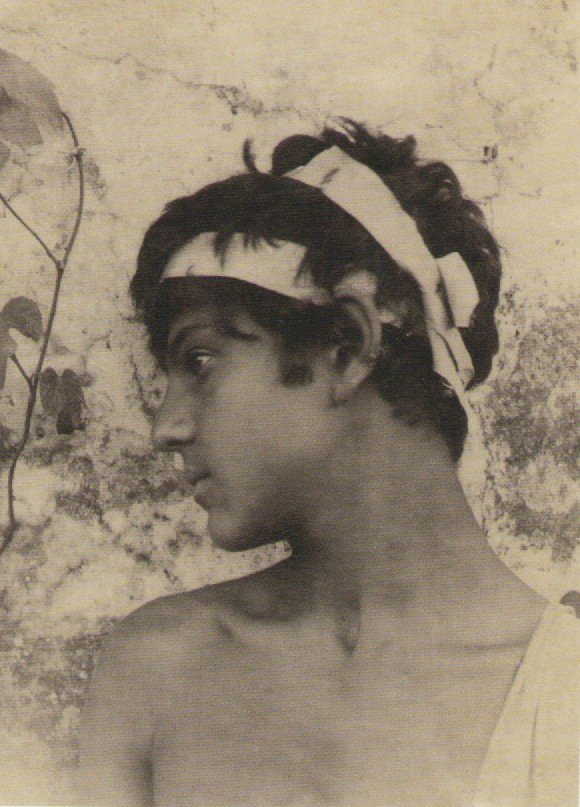
Portrait of Vincenzo Galdi (c. 1895)

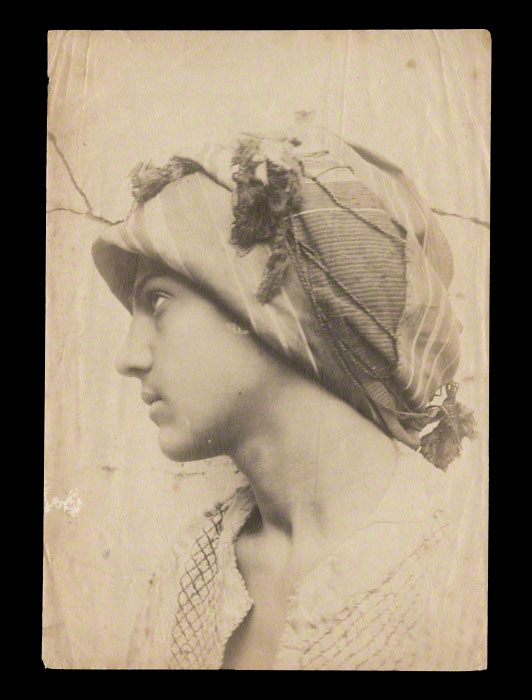
Galdi wearing a turban (c. 1895)

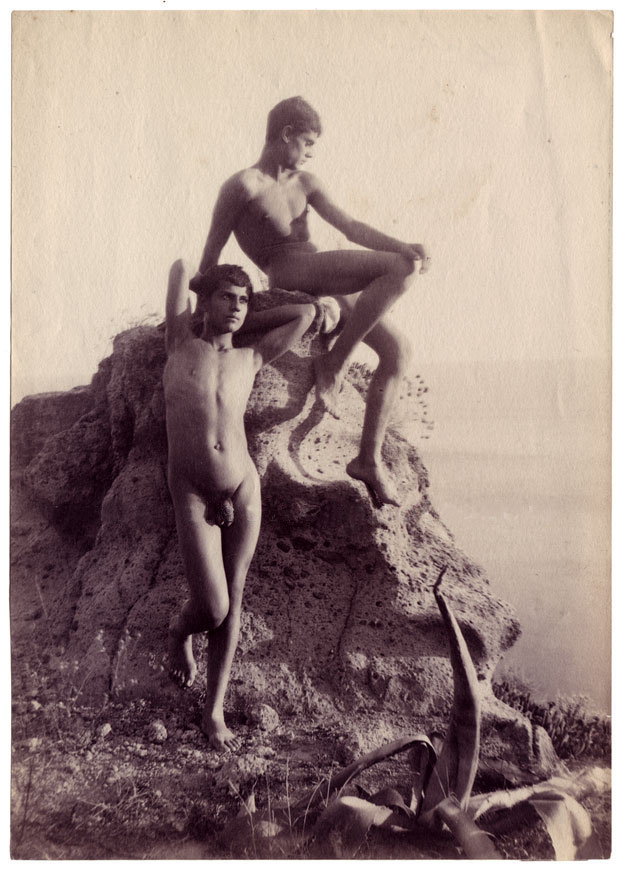
Edoardo and Vincenzo Galdi. Reverse: "Naples"

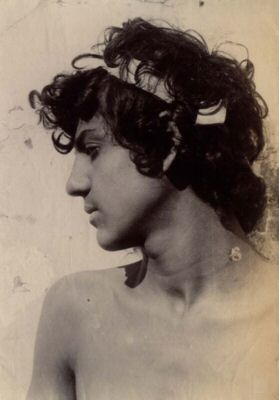
Galdi wearing a turban (c. 1895)

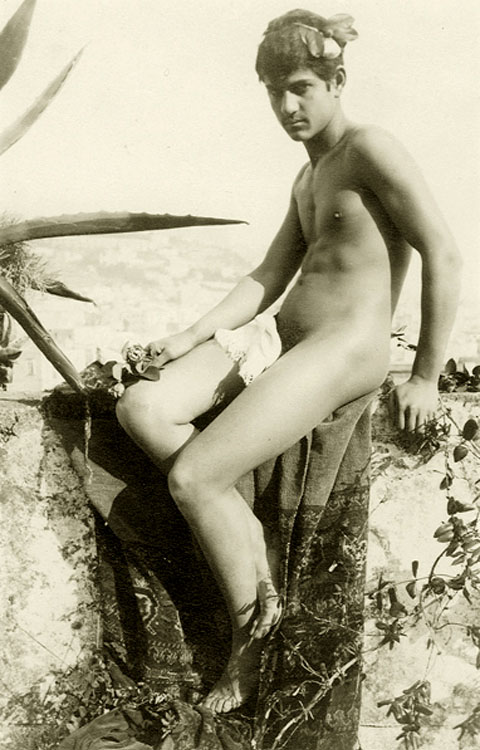
Classic nude of Galdi (c. 1895), at Mergellina

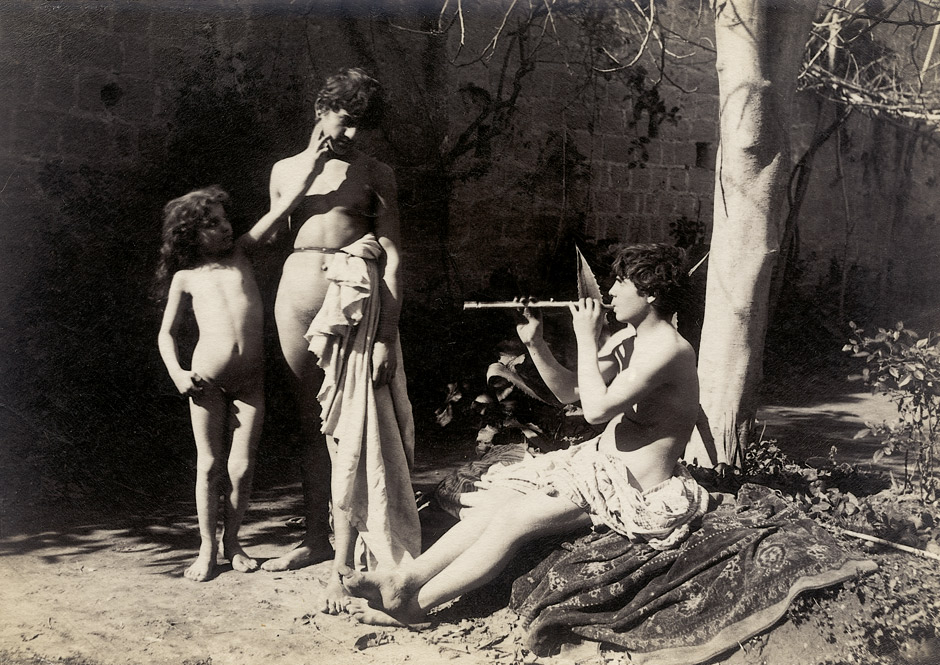
Galdi in garden at Rampa di Posillipo 55

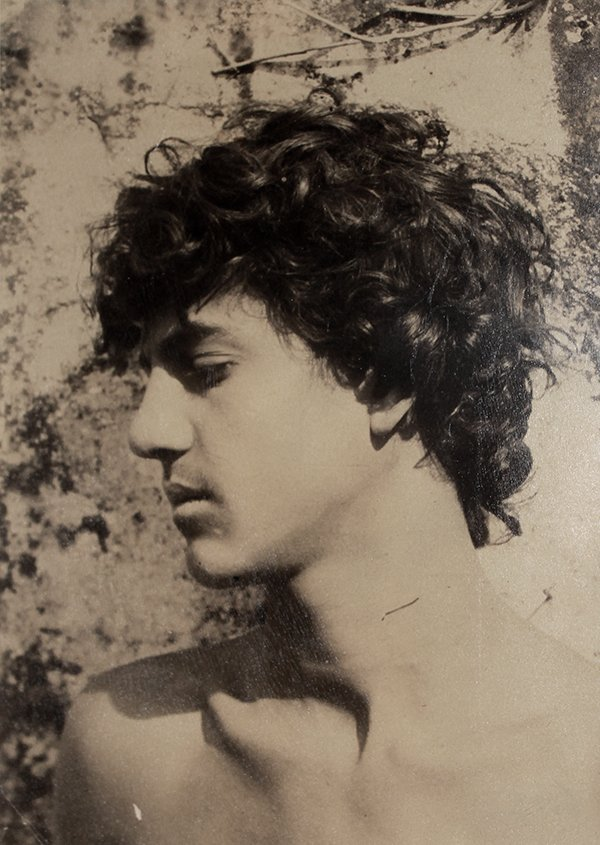
Portrait of Galdi (c. 1895)

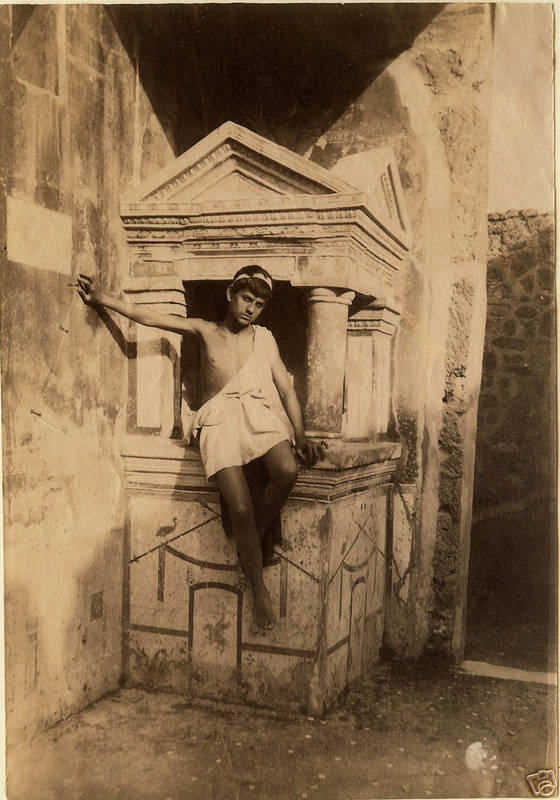
Galdi as a boy seated on a lararium at Pompeii

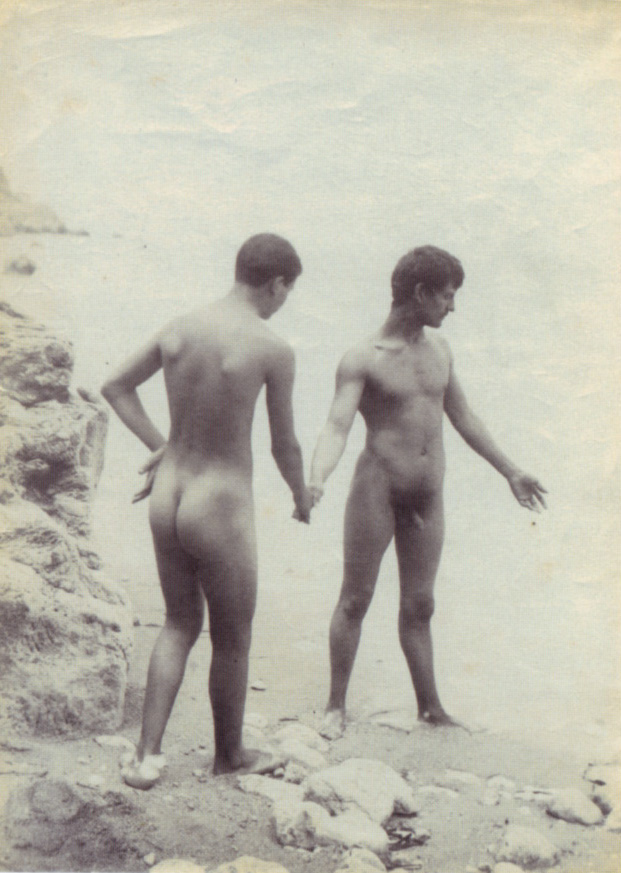
Two youths on shore; right figure possibly Galdi (c. 1900)

Edoardo and possibly a young Galdi in Plüschow's garden

== Bibliography ==
- Albers, Bernhard, ed. (1993). Vincenzo Galdi, Wilhelm von Gloeden, Wilhelm von Plüschow: Aktaufnahmen aus der Sammlung Uwe Scheid (in German). Aachen: Rimbaud Presse. ISBN 978-3-89086-938-4.
- Dore, Tommaso (2012). Galdi Revealed: The Eclecticism of Vincenzo Galdi, Photographer and Art Dealer. Rome: Italus Edizioni.
- Et in Arcadia ego: Fotografien von Wilhelm von Gloeden, Guglielmo Plüschow und Vincenzo Galdi (in German). Zurich: Edition Oehrli. 2000. ISBN 978-3-905597-20-2.
- Janssen, Volker, ed. (1991). Wilhelm von Gloeden, Wilhelm von Plüschow, Vincenzo Galdi: Italienische Jünglings-Photographien um 1900 (in German). Berlin: Janssen Verlag. ISBN 978-3-925443-11-4.
- Poésies Arcadiennes: Von Gloeden, Vincenzo Galdi, Von Plüschow: Photographies fin XIXe, exposition du 24 (in French). Paris: Galerie Au Bonheur du Jour; Thélès. 2003. OCLC 799519148.
- Puig, Herman, ed. (1977). Von Gloeden et le XIXe siècle: Eugène Durieu, Charles Simart, Guglielmo Marconi, Vincenzo Galdi, Guglielmo (in French). Paris: Puig. ISBN 978-2-903388-01-0.
- Puig, Herman, ed. (1985). Les jardins interdits: 23 photos de Wilhelm von Gloeden, Guglielmo Plüschow, Vincenzo Galdi & anonymes (in French). Paris: Puig. OCLC 944975541.
- Canet, Nicole, ed. (2014). Galdi, von Gloeden, von Plüschow – Beautés Siciliennes (in French). Paris: Nicole Canet. ISBN 978-2-9532351-7-3.
- Dall'Orto, Giovanni (July 2014). "Vincenzo Galdi". Wikipink (in Italian).
