= Theodore Frelinghuysen Dwight =

American librarian, archivist, and diplomat (1846-1917)

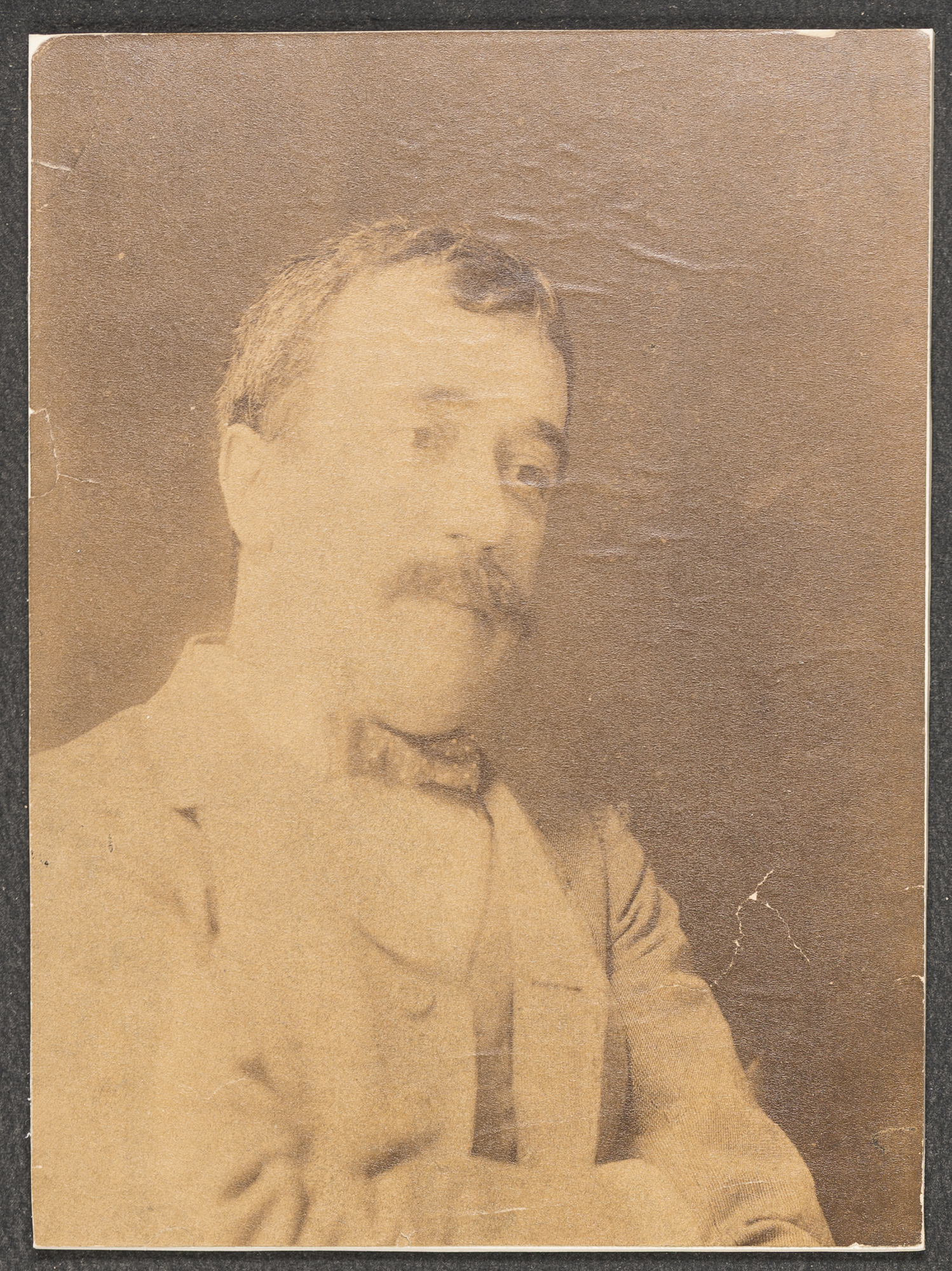
- Theodore F. Dwight, self-portrait circa 1890
- Born: June 11, 1846; Auburn, New York, U.S.
- Died: February 3, 1917 (aged 70); Boston, Massachusetts, U.S.
- Burial place: Harmony Grove Cemetery, Salem, Massachusetts

Theodore Frelinghuysen Dwight (June 11, 1846 – February 3, 1917) was an American librarian, archivist, and diplomat who was a member of Boston's elite homosexual subculture in the late 19th century. His place in American literary history was secured when he served for almost a decade as Henry Adams's literary assistant and family archivist.

== Early life ==
Theodore Frelinghuysen Dwight was born in Auburn, New York, the son of Almon Dwight (1814–1902) and Cyria Charge White (1817–1897).

His father professed the Millerite Doctrine, the belief that the second coming of Christ would occur around 1843 or 1844 and, acting on that belief, lived in Jerusalem for four years before Theodore's birth, between 1837 and 1841, where he ran an industrial school.

From 1865 until 1869, Theodore Dwight attended Rochester Collegiate Institute and paid his way through school by working in a wholesale saddlery and hardware store.

== Career ==
The major portion of Dwight's career was as a librarian and archivist. Later in life, he served as an American diplomat. He occasionally worked as a bookkeeper, editor, and proofreader.

=== Early literary work ===
Around 1868, Dwight moved from Rochester to San Francisco, where he lived at 256 Bush Street and worked as a bookkeeper for the Pacific Union Express Company. Shortly after arriving in San Francisco, Dwight became a member of the local literary scene that included such established writers as Bret Harte, Ina Coolbrith, and Charles Warren Stoddard. Dwight began writing for Harte's magazine Overland Monthly, primarily about books and autograph collecting. His writing occasionally drew notice in East Coast publications. His place in the local arts and letters scene was recognized when in January 1872 he was elected a trustee of the San Francisco Mercantile Library Association.

In the early fall of 1873, Dwight moved to New York City to take a position in the publishing house of G.P. Putnam’s Sons.

=== State Department librarian ===
In 1875, Dwight left Putnam’s and moved to Washington, D.C., where he served briefly as a literary assistant to the American historian George Bancroft.

While working for Bancroft, Dwight became known to the State Department Library senior staff, who eventually offered him the position of Chief of the Bureau of Rolls and Library. The Bureau was the repository of manuscripts related to the foreign relations of the United States, beginning with the Continental Congress in 1774. Dwight held the position from 1875 until 1888.

While there, Dwight assembled what was at the time called "the best international law library outside of the British Museum.”

In 1881, Secretary of State James G. Blaine instructed Dwight to assist the U.S. Government in acquiring a collection of Benjamin Franklin's papers. The papers were on the market in London, England, and Dwight, who was then traveling in Europe, went to London to examine the papers and assess their relevance to American history. He reported to the Senate that the papers "are the veritable records of our history, and are as worthy of a place among the national archives as those of Washington, Jefferson, and Hamilton."

=== Adams family archivist ===
In 1888, Dwight left Washington to take charge of organizing and indexing the Adams family political papers, including those of John Adams and John Quincy Adams, housed in that historic American family’s so-called “Stone Library” (a reference to its construction in stone) on the Adams estate in Quincy, Massachusetts, a position he held for the next four years. His duties for the Adams family included organizing and indexing the presidential and family papers as well as serving as a proofreader for Henry Adams and his brother Charles Francis Adams Jr.

=== Boston Public Library ===
In March 1892, Dwight was chosen to head the Boston Public Library, at a critical point in the Library's history. A new building on Boston’s Copley Square was under construction and Dwight's selection was eagerly anticipated by Boston society. He began his job on April 13, 1892, but his tenure was from the outset characterized by personal and professional turmoil. Henry Adams was aware of the crisis that faced both Dwight and the Library, writing to a family friend: "Rumors reach me about Dwight, and grow more emphatic, but I am in deadly terror of him, and want to escape being drawn into the inevitable collapse of his ambitions. I never had so much difficulty in keeping out of a quarrel as in this case."

On December 19, 1893, Dwight gave four-months' notice that he would leave the Library on April 30, 1894, but Library trustees immediately granted him a leave of absence for the remainder of his term, stating publicly that his departure was due to "poor health and inability to stand the cares and responsibilities of the office." Rumors in Boston suggested that his resignation was not voluntary. The Boston Globe opined:

How any young man with such a brilliant future before him as librarian of an institution like the new Boston public library could voluntarily throw so glittering a prospect aside is what passes the comprehension of the layman, who can appreciate the social and literary standing which the librarianship must necessarily give any man. There is thought to be a possibility that Mr. Dwight's withdrawal was not voluntary. Mr. Dwight says it was, and further asserts he never has had any talk with any of the trustees relative to retiring.

Dwight may also have been moonlighting elsewhere in a way that interfered with his duties at the Library. In 1895, within a year of his departure from the Boston Public Library, he published two volumes of Civil War History for the Military Historical Society of Massachusetts, of which he was a member: Campaigns in Virginia 1861-1862, The Virginia Campaign of 1862 Under General Pope and Critical Sketches of Some of the Federal and Confederate Commanders. Dwight's work on these two hefty volumes must have been underway for a least two years before their publication.

With his reputation as a librarian ruined in Boston, Dwight wrote to his friend Isabella Stewart Gardner on August 27, 1894, that he had no prospects there, but might move to Chicago and seek work there. "My efforts to be patient & cheerful usually end in failure," he wrote to Gardner, a reference to the emotional problems that Adams and others had noted off and on for years.

=== U.S. Consul at Vevey ===
In 1904, Dwight's friend Senator Henry Cabot Lodge, a member of the powerful Senate Foreign Relations Committee, asked Secretary of State John Hay to appoint Dwight as U.S. Consul at Geneva. Dwight, by now living in England, accepted the position but tried unsuccessfully to impose conditions on the terms of the appointment. The State Department withdrew the nomination.

Some months later, Lodge again asked Hay to appoint Dwight as Consul, this time at the much smaller American Consulate at Vevey, Switzerland. Hay agreed, and by 1905, Dwight had taken over the post in Vevey.

== Personal life ==
=== Club memberships ===
Dwight was a member of several prominent men's clubs and historical organizations, including the Cosmos Club, the American Antiquarian Society, the Massachusetts Historical Society, the Military Historical Society of Massachusetts, the Tavern Club, and the St. Botolph Club. In 1884, he was made an honorary member of the Harvard College chapter of Phi Beta Kappa Alpha.

=== Friendship with Henry Adams ===
Sometime around October 1881, Dwight, then librarian of the State Department, became acquainted with American historian Henry Adams, who was researching his landmark publication, The History of the United States of America (1801 to 1817). Adams worked with thousands of pages of original documents housed in the State Department archives and came to rely on Dwight, who was meticulous, hard working, and knew the State Department collection inside and out.

Sometime around 1885, Dwight began moonlighting as a personal and literary assistant to Henry Adams. Though the exact nature of his duties are unclear, they almost certainly included proofreading and editorial work on Adams’s History of the United States.

During the summer of 1885, Dwight lived in Adams's house at 1607 H Street, facing Lafayette Square. Dwight managed the house and its staff while Adams and his wife were on vacation in Virginia. Adams viewed Dwight as a friend rather than caretaker; for example, Adams encouraged him to make use of his wine cellar during the couple's absence. After Adams's wife died in December 1885, Dwight moved in with Adams to help him run the household and, as Dwight described in a letter to a friend, to "support his bereavement." He continued his work at the State Department while living in Adams's home for the next three years.

In March 1888, Adams and Dwight traveled together to Cuba by way of Florida, where they visited friends of Adams before sailing to Cuba for a visit of two weeks. In a letter to a friend, Adams called Dwight his "companion". In Havana, the two men attended a bull fight, a carnavale mascarade, and the opera, but ultimately found the city to be too noisy and, in Adam's opinion, a "gay ruin".

Shortly after their return from Cuba, Dwight resigned from his position at the State Department Library and within a few months began working for the Adams family as their archivist in the "Stone Library" located on the Adams homestead in Quincy, Massachusetts. The Stone Library is now part of the Adams National Historical Park and houses the personal and family papers of John Adams, John Quincy Adams, Charles Francis Adams Sr., Henry Adams, and Brooks Adams.

During Dwight's years working in Quincy, Adams became increasingly concerned about Dwight's mental health, as documented in dozens of letters from Adams to friends and family. In 1890, he wrote to Dwight: “I am very anxious to hear that you are feeling right. I cannot believe that the trouble is beyond easy and quick treatment. These clouds vanish as quickly as they come, and some day you will wake up right. Most men and women have had the experience.”

By mid-1891, anticipating both the conclusion of Dwight's duties in Quincy and the possibility that Dwight might be named Librarian of the Boston Public Library, Adams encouraged Dwight to consider leaving the employ of his family and accept the Library job if it were offered to him. The letters of Adams to his friends during these years contain many references to Dwight's mental health and Adams’s worries about him, so that was almost certainly another reason Adams encouraged Dwight to leave:

By all means [Adams writing to Dwight], accept the Librarian-ship if it is offered to you. I do not know how far you have got along with the Quincy [Adams] library; but I suppose by this time that is sufficiently in order; the papers arranged, and the indexes carried far enough to be finished in reasonable time. After these things are once organised, the work of carrying them on requires no great care or labor. A year of attention ought to exhaust the whole thing, as far as it requires your close labor. I take for granted that this is long ago done, and that you have really no more to do at Quincy, and rather need a bigger field and better position. If I were you, I should certainly take it, as I told you long ago, when we first discussed the subject of your leaving the [State] Department.

Early in 1892, Adams and his brother Charles Francis Adams Jr. decided that the work Dwight was doing for them on the Adams family political papers would not continue past the summer.

Adams would remain friendly with Dwight and his wife Sally until their deaths. He visited the Dwights in Switzerland in 1902.

=== Homosexuality ===
After moving to Boston to serve the Adams family, Dwight took up residence in a gentleman's rooming house at 10 Charles Street where his lover, the writer and dramatist Thomas Russell Sullivan, also lived. The two men were not reticent about their relationship. They entertained together, were members of the same clubs, and went out in society as a male couple. They socialized together, for example, over private dinners with Isabella Stewart Gardner and her husband John Lowell Gardner at Boston’s Somerset Club.

Dwight corresponded quite openly with Isabella Stewart Gardner about his impulses and affairs, writing in one letter to her:

You would be amused could you know how in my secret thoughts of late I have been chiefly engaged in trying to penetrate my own disguise to find the real Dwight, for it is really ridiculous that I should all unconsciously have played a part so well as to deceive so many intelligent and respectable people. I dare not think of the time when they will discover their mistake.

In 1892, while Dwight was traveling to meet Gardner in Europe, Sullivan wrote to her about the sadness he felt during Dwight’s absence:

I mourn for T.F.D. who has departed this house and sails for your shores in two days... Sturgis Bigelow, M.D., has come in with hypnotic influence and carries me off to dine with him to-night with the resident literati and tutti Frutti... Don’t keep our librarian away too long.

Dwight and Sullivan were also frequently guests at W. Sturgis Bigelow's male-only nudist colony on remote Tuckernuck Island, though membership was not strictly limited to homosexuals.

In 1892, Dwight bought 121 male nude photographs by Guglielmo Plüschow and Wilhelm von Gloeden in Munich and bought more in London later that summer. In a letter to his friend Charles Warren Stoddard, Dwight bragged that he had gotten the photographs through U.S. Customs without being detected, thus preventing "confiscation and imprisonment". "When you see my spoils you will comprehend my dangers", he wrote to Stoddard.

In January 1896, while on his honeymoon, he visited von Plüschow’s studio in Rome. He was such a good customer that von Plüschow permitted Dwight to use the studio to take his own photographs of the models Dwight most appreciated:

Pluschow himself was not visible but I was given all the opportunities to see his collection, without, apparently, any expectation of [a] sale, by his German assistant. ... While we were talking who should come in but a very handsome, black haired & mustachioed Italian, quite stout built, broad shouldered, perhaps 24 years old, who seemed anxious to be noticed & very much in command of the place; & presently I learned that he was Vincenzo Goldi (sic) the subject of so many of our pictures. He posed for those in sitting posture on the wall, with a fillet round his head & with Edoard, the more beautiful youth, in an infinite number of others. I told him that I knew him from the soles of his feet to the top of his head & he immediately became most talkative, showing me all his favorite attitudes. We established such friendly relations that I have now the privilege of making photos myself in the Pluschow studio & of his models.

In another letter to her, Dwight described the breakup of an unidentified love affair, writing "...the period has come to that little romance in which I was so foolish as to indulge. You were right in your prediction. I seem to come out of it somewhat battered perhaps, & somewhat benumbed but quite patient & resigned."

The Boston historian Douglass Shand-Tucci concluded that Dwight's homosexuality was one of the reasons for his hasty departure from the Boston Public Library.

=== Marriage to Sally Loring ===
In November 1895, at the age of 49, Dwight married Sally Pickman Loring (1859–1913), the daughter of Congressman George Bailey Loring of Salem. The marriage followed a very brief courtship and was a surprise to Dwight's circle of friends, given his open homosexuality and the fact that Dwight had no known previous platonic or romantic involvement with women. Senator Henry Cabot Lodge's wife Anna Cabot Mills Davis advised Sally not to marry Dwight after the engagement was announced because of Dwight's reputation as a homosexual. Dwight's lover Sullivan likened it to a death, writing in his journal: "To-night I dined quietly at Miss Sally Loring's with Dwight. They are to be married very soon, and pass a year in Europe. So, in this whirl of life, Love and Death go hand in hand."

During the early years of their marriage, the couple lived in what was then known as "the Bradbury Estate" at Kendal Green in Weston.

Their son Lawrence Dwight (1896–1918) was born a year later in Boston, on November 6, 1896. Lawrence spent most of his youth in Vevey, Switzerland, where his father was U.S. Consul. He graduated August 30, 1917, from the United States Military Academy at West Point, New York. He was to have graduated from the Academy a year later in the spring of 1918, but his class finished a year early due to World War I. Lawrence died six months later of pneumonia in Brest, France, without having seen battle. He held the rank of Second Lieutenant at the time of his death and is buried in the Suresnes American Cemetery and Memorial in France.

== Death ==
Dwight died on February 3, 1917, at the age of 70. At the time, he was living at 48 Beacon Street on Boston's Beacon Hill. His health had been failing for several years, though he stayed in touch with friends by phone and letter, especially Isabella Stewart Gardner. Dwight's obituary in The Boston Globe made no mention of his wife or son, even though Sally had been a prominent member of Boston society for many years before her marriage to him.

He is buried alongside his wife in the Harmony Grove Cemetery in Salem, Massachusetts.

== Bibliography ==
- Roger Austen, Genteel Pagan: The Double Life of Charles Warren Stoddard (Amherst, University of Massachusetts Press, 1991)
- J.C. Levenson, Ernest Samuels, et al., eds. The Letters of Henry Adams, 6 Vols. (Cambridge, Mass.: Belknap Press of Harvard University Press, 1982-1988)
- Ernest Samuels, The Young Henry Adams (Cambridge, Mass.: Belknap Press of Harvard University Press, 1967)
- Ernest Samuels, Henry Adams: The Middle Years (Cambridge, Mass.: Belknap Press of Harvard University Press, 1965)
- Ernest Samuels, Henry Adams: The Major Phase (Cambridge, Mass.: Belknap Press of Harvard University Press, 1964)
- Douglass Shand-Tucci, Boston Bohemia: 1881–1900. Ralph Adams Cram: Life and Architecture (Amherst: University of Massachusetts Press, 1995)
- T.R. Sullivan, Passages from the Journal of Thomas Russell Sullivan, 1891-1903 (Boston: Houghton, Mifflin Co., 1917)
