= Theodore Dwight =

Theodore Dwight may refer to:

- Theodore Dwight (author) (1796–1866), author, son of Theodore Dwight
- Theodore Dwight (politician) (1764–1846), Federalist member of U.S. Congress
- Theodore William Dwight (1822–1892), U.S. jurist
- Theodore Frelinghuysen Dwight (1846–1917), American librarian, archivist, and diplomat

== See also ==
- Theodore Dwight Weld (1803–1895), abolitionist
- Theodore Dwight Woolsey (1801–1889), president of Yale College
