= Justice Dwight =

Justice Dwight is an American multidisciplinary visual artist. He is known for pop art painted portraits, where he incorporates bold color, pattern, and texture. Dwight utilizes different art forms such as painting, sewing, mixed media collage, and screen printing. He lives in Richmond, Virginia.

== Early life ==
Justice Dwight was born in Plainfield, New Jersey, raised in Richmond, Virginia. He is queer. At six years old, Dwight was inspired by seeing his father paint. He admires Black artists such as Barkley Hendricks, Bisa Butler, and Derrick Adams.

== Career ==
Dwight aims to showcase different aspects of identity, acceptance, and love; and specifically on Black queerness.

Dwight's Queer Prom Series showcases different pieces of quilted photographs highlighting what it would look and feel like having a prom at this stage in his life where he is authentically himself and openly queer. This set up was at the 1708 Gallery in Richmond, Virginia. The Queer Prom Project was available for view the whole month of August 2025.

Dwight had collaborated with the United States Embassy in Havana, Cuba to work on a mural project that incorporated themes of internal conflicts. He chose themes of Black queer struggle and painted murals of themes that included young love, mature love, joy, visibility, and overall representation. The series was called Star Children of the Universe.

Dwight had his exhibition, Textile Truths: Faces of Resilience shown at the ACA Galleries in New York in 2026, which transformed textiles into vessels of heritage, dignity, and endurance.
