= Guglielmo Plüschow =

German photographer (1852–1930)

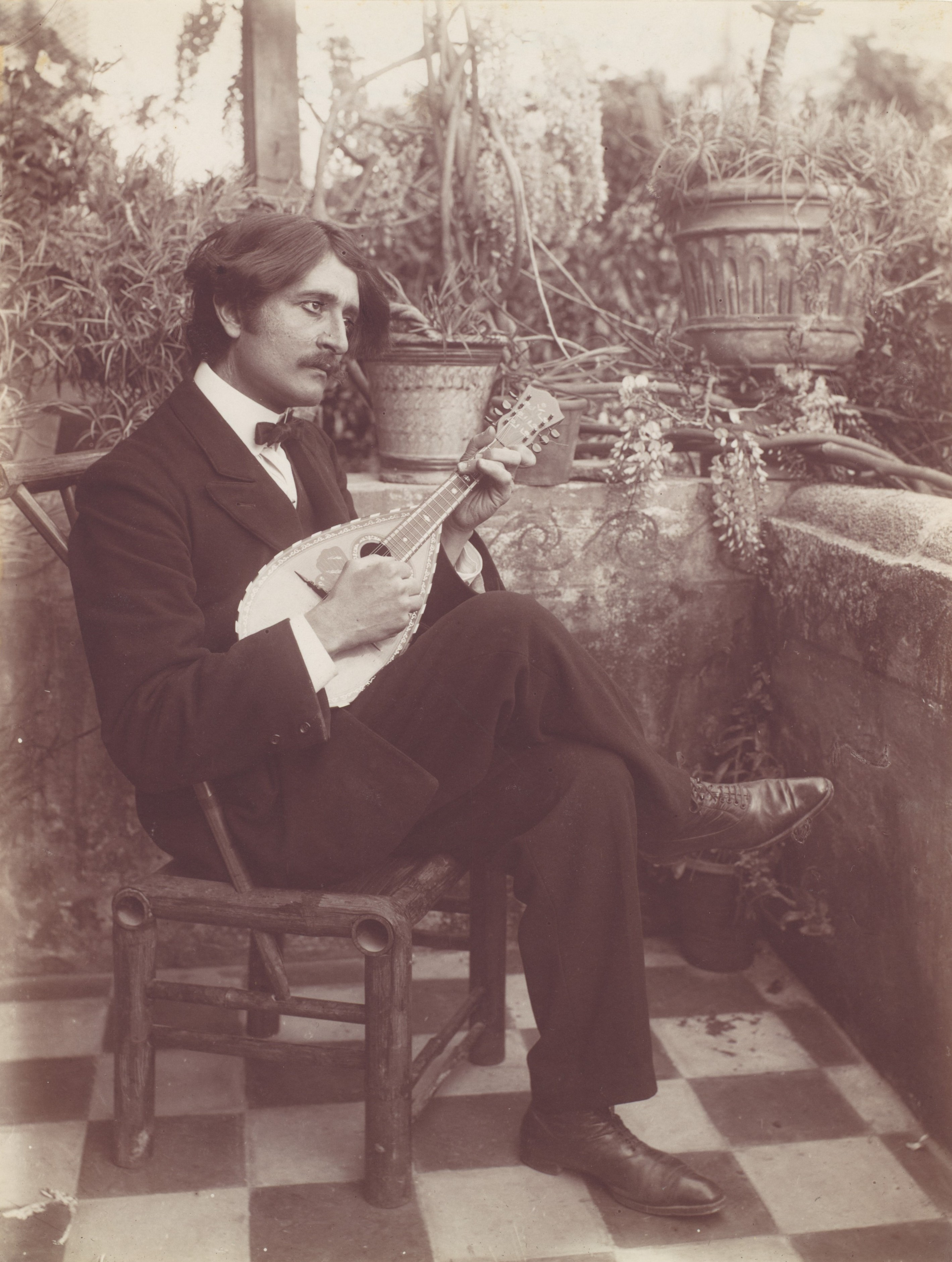
Wilhelm von Plüschow as photographed by his cousin Wilhelm von Gloeden (c. 1890)

Guglielmo Plüschow (born Wilhelm Plüschow; 18 August 1852 – 3 January 1930) was a German photographer who moved to Italy and became known for his nude photos of local youths, predominantly males. Plüschow was a cousin of Wilhelm von Gloeden, who, despite taking up nude photography later than Plüschow, soon overshadowed him. Plüschow was several times at odds with the law and charged with corruption of minors. Today, his photography is recognized for its artistic merits, but it generally is considered somewhat inferior to Gloeden's because of his less graceful handling of lighting and the sometimes strangely stilted poses of his models.

== Biography ==
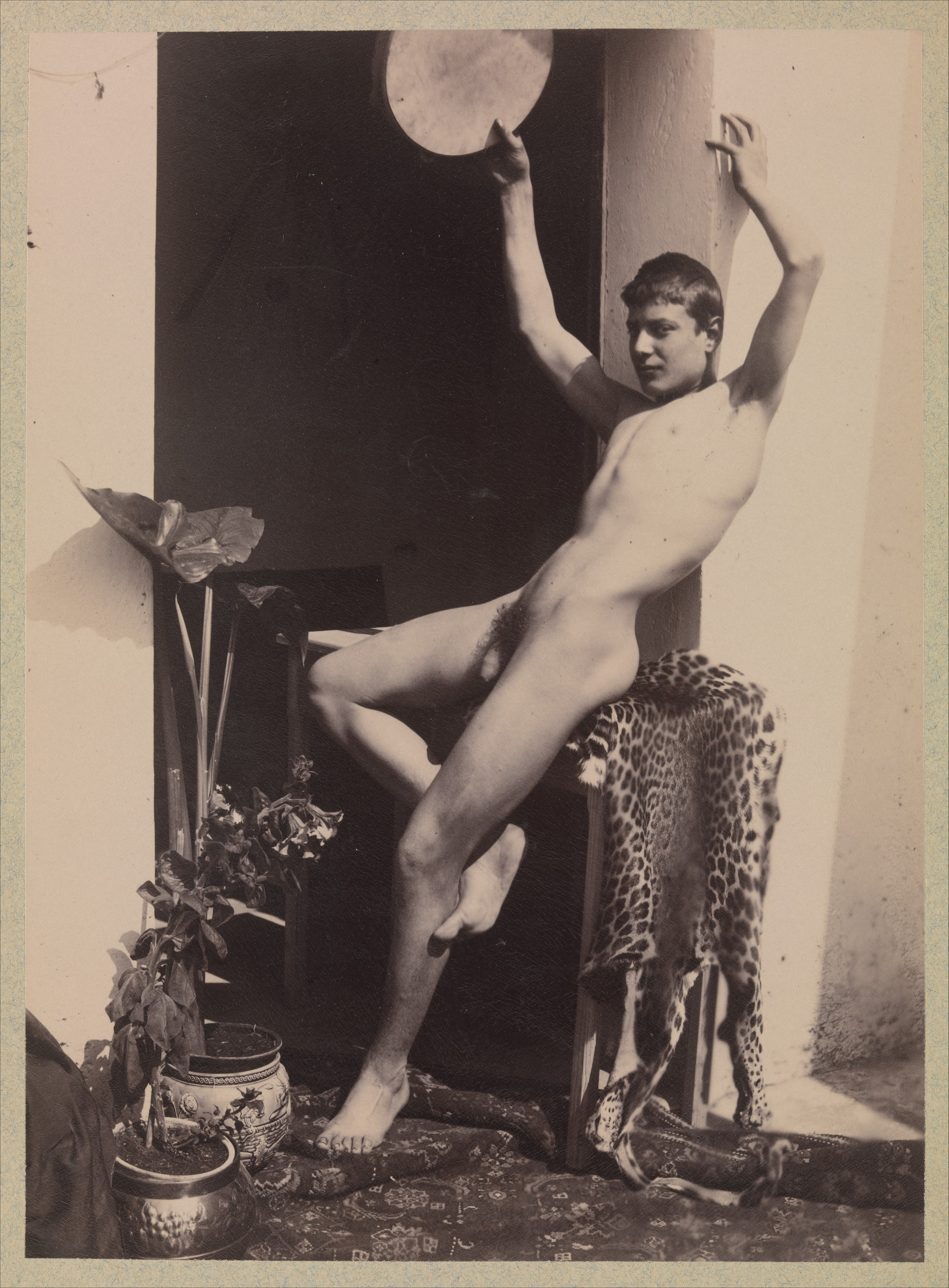
Male Nude Seated on Leopard Skin at the Metropolitan Museum of Art, c. 1890s–1900s

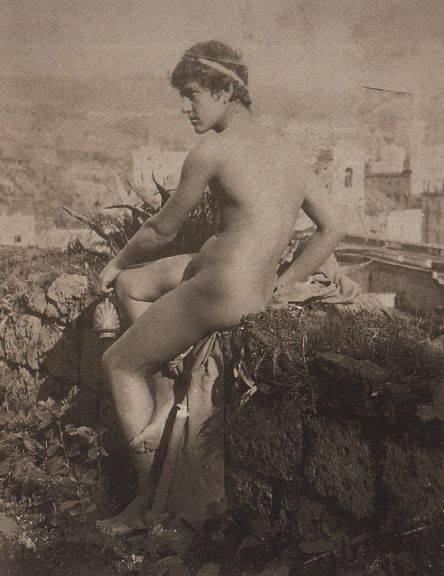
Wilhelm von Pluschow – Vincenzo Galdi, Posillipo (Napoli), c. 1890

Not much is known about Plüschow's early life, except that he was born in Wismar in 1852 as the eldest of seven brothers and sisters. His father, Friedrich Carl Eduard Plüschow, was an illegitimate child of Frederick Louis, Hereditary Grand Duke of Mecklenburg-Schwerin, and the family home was Schloss Plüschow.

In the early 1870s, he moved to Rome and changed his first name from Wilhelm to its Italian equivalent, Guglielmo. Initially making a living as a wine merchant, he soon turned to male and female nude photography. Later he also worked in Naples.

One of Plüschow's more famous models was Vincenzo Galdi (pictured left), who was probably one of Plüschow's lovers. Galdi later became a photographer in his own right, as well as an art gallery owner.

In 1902, Plüschow, who was gay like Gloeden, was charged with "common procuration" and "seduction of minors" and had to spend eight months in jail. Another scandal followed in 1907, and in 1910, Plüschow left Italy for good and returned to Berlin. The accusations caused the police to seize a lot of his photographs, while Vincenzo Galdi was considered his accomplice.

== In popular culture ==
In Steve Berman's short story "The Haferbräutigam", Plüschow has an encounter with a mischievous spirit while travelling back to Wismar in 1907.

== Gallery ==
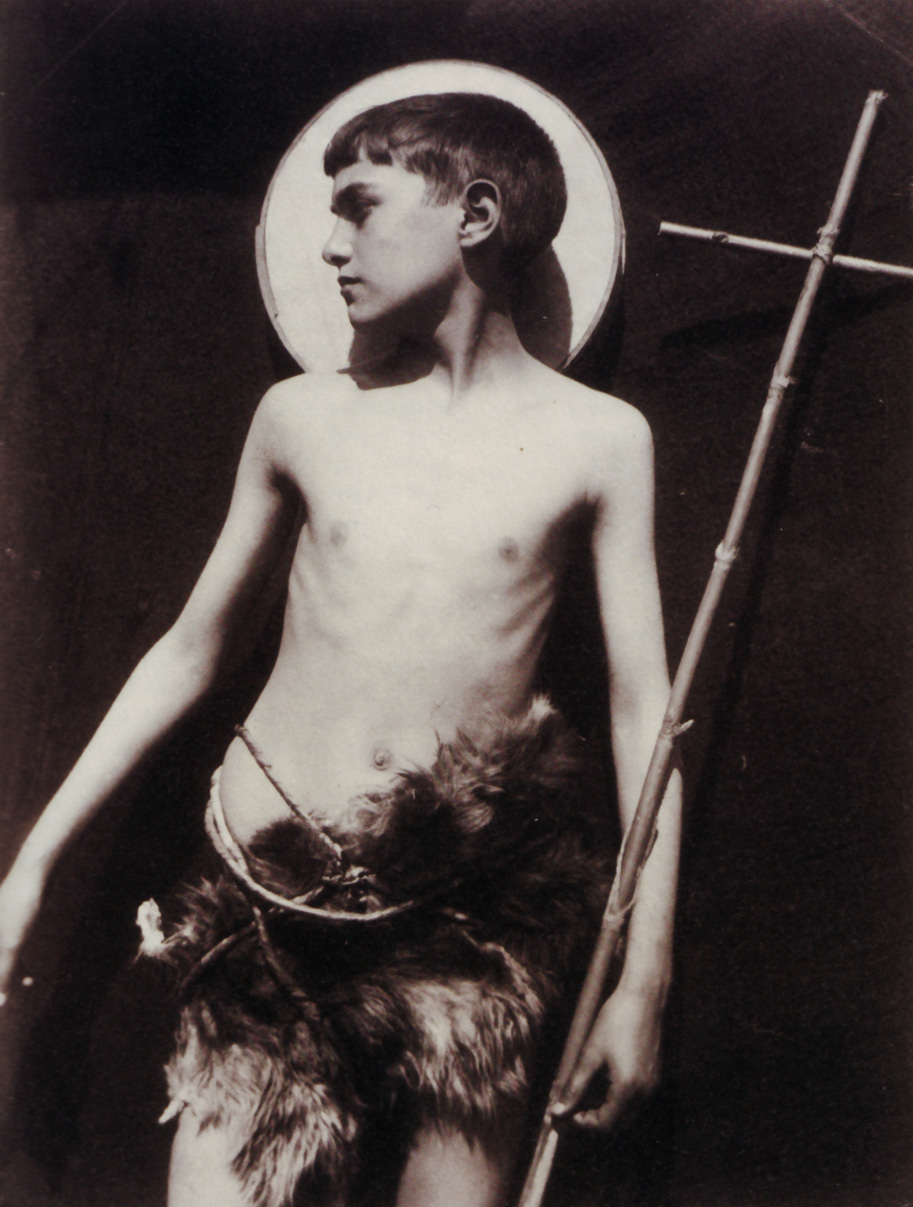
Boy Posed as John the Baptist

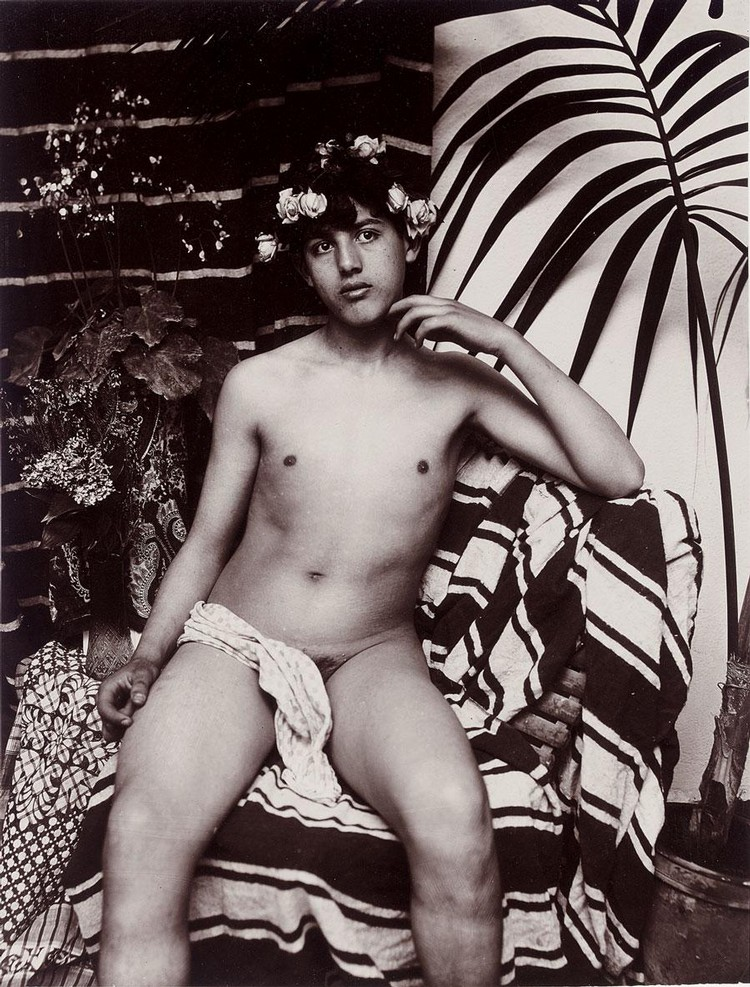
Algerian Boy

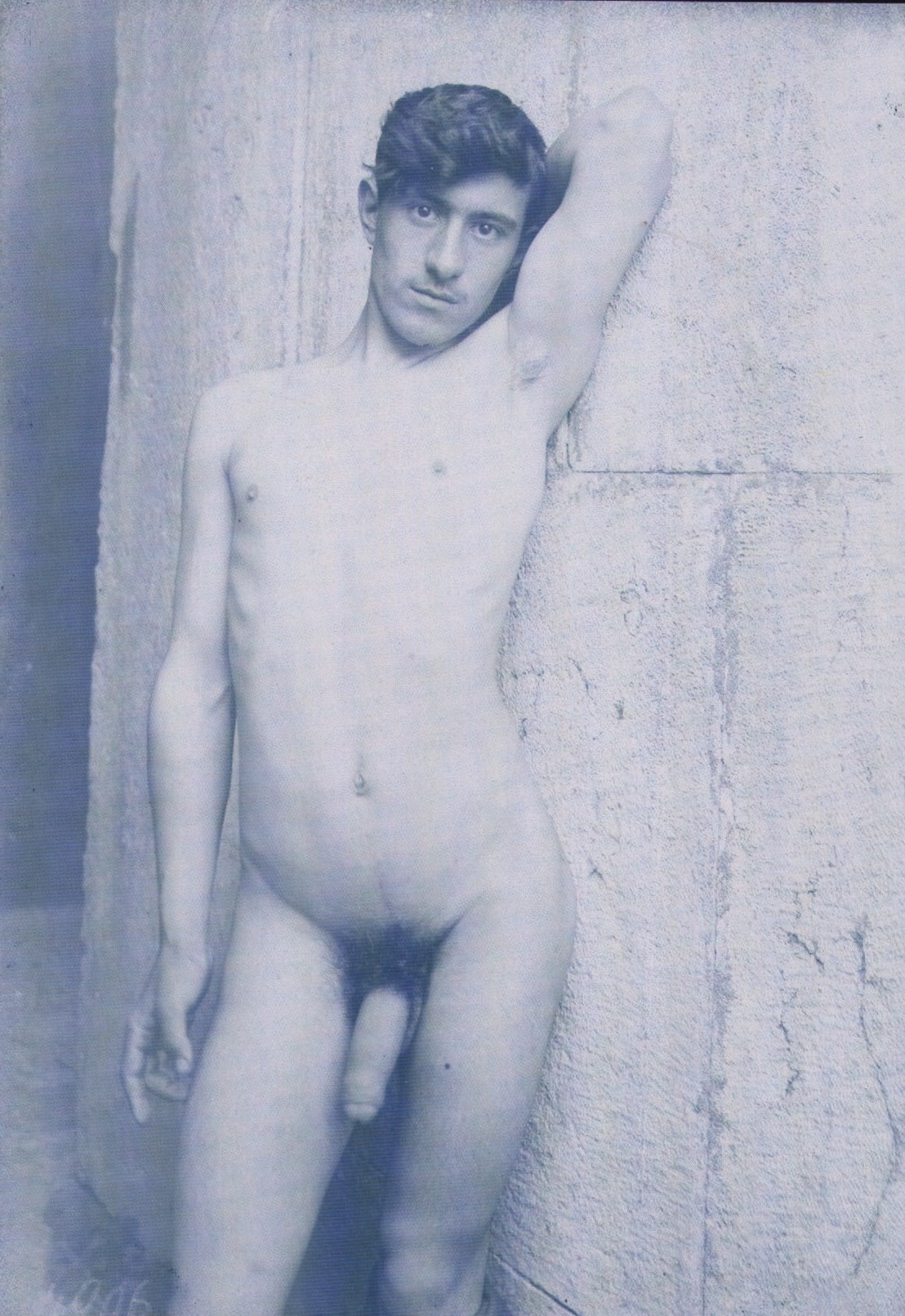
Young Man in the Nude

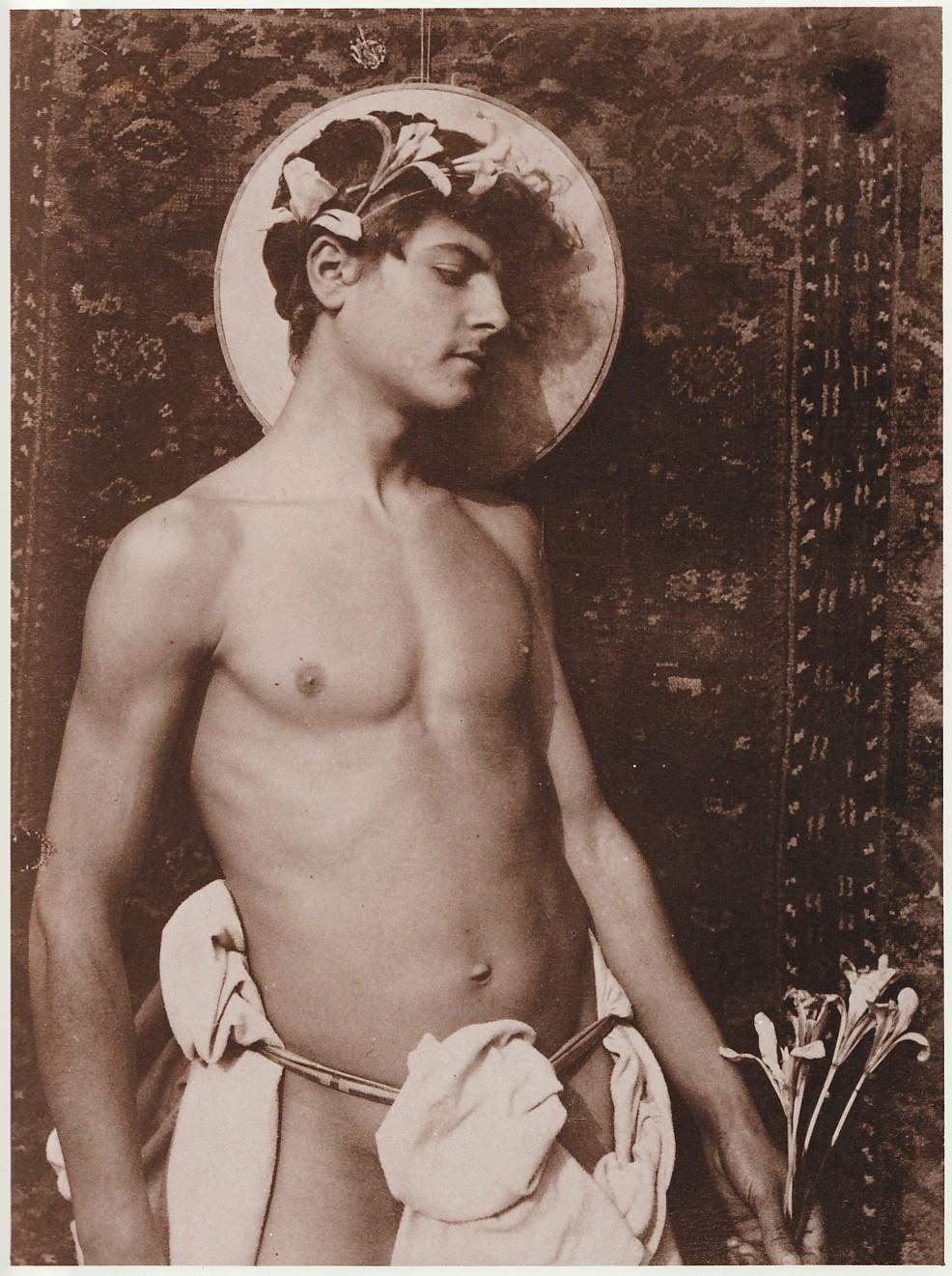
The Christian Martyr, Portrait of Nino Cesarini

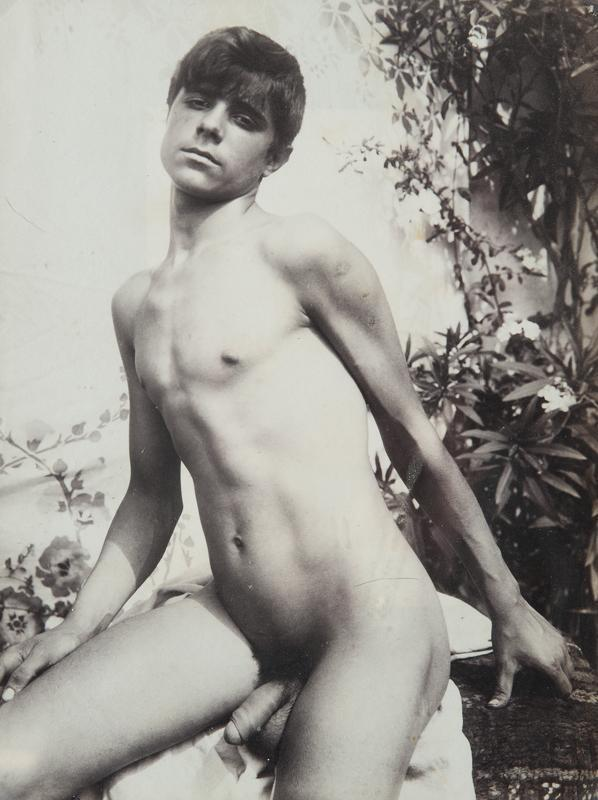
Untitled

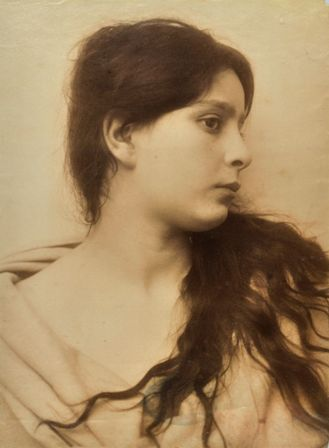
Untitled

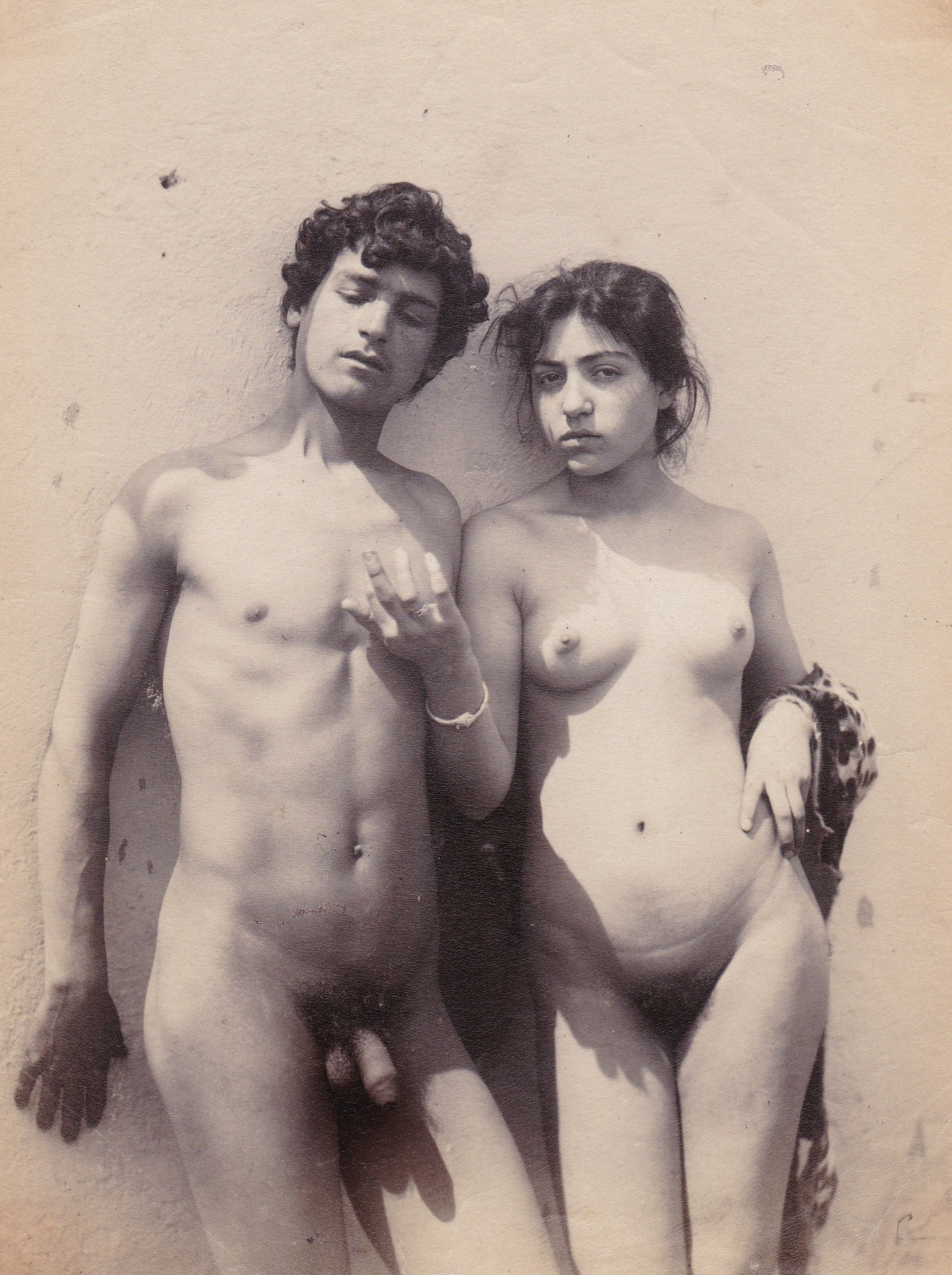
Nude study

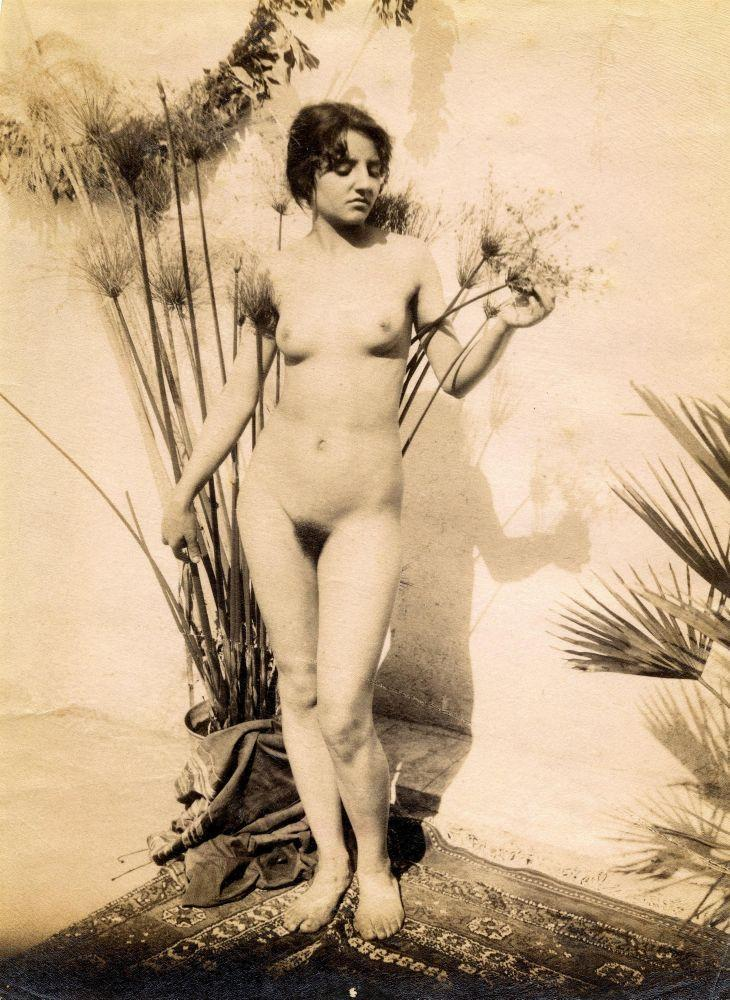
Nude Woman

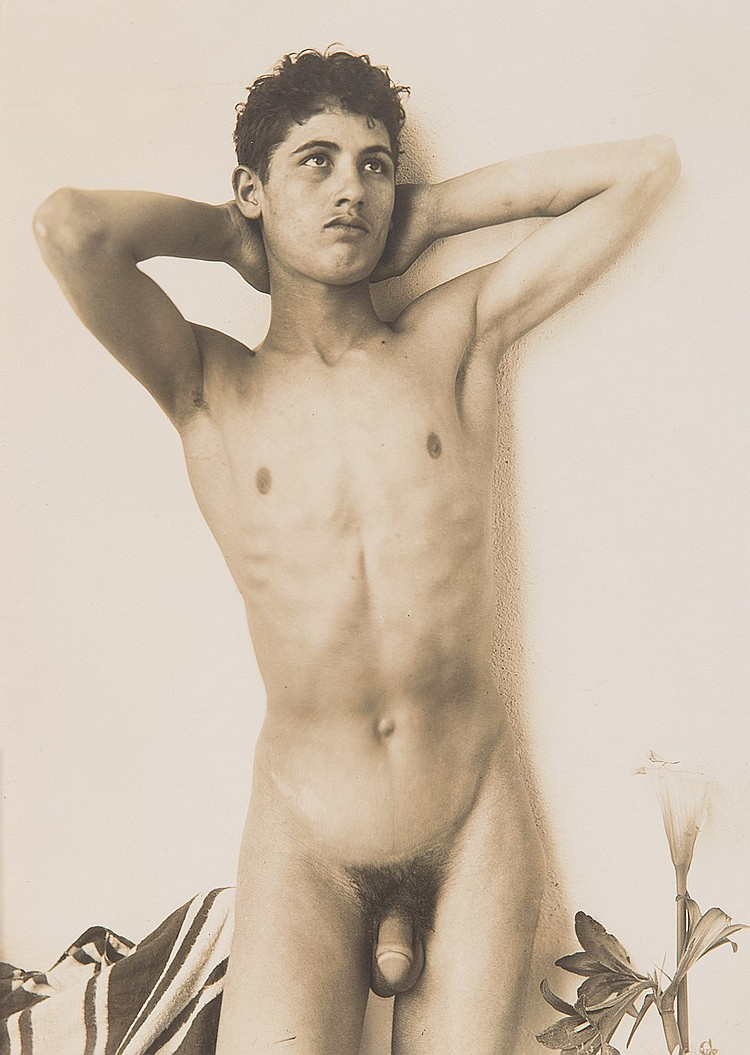
Algerian Boy

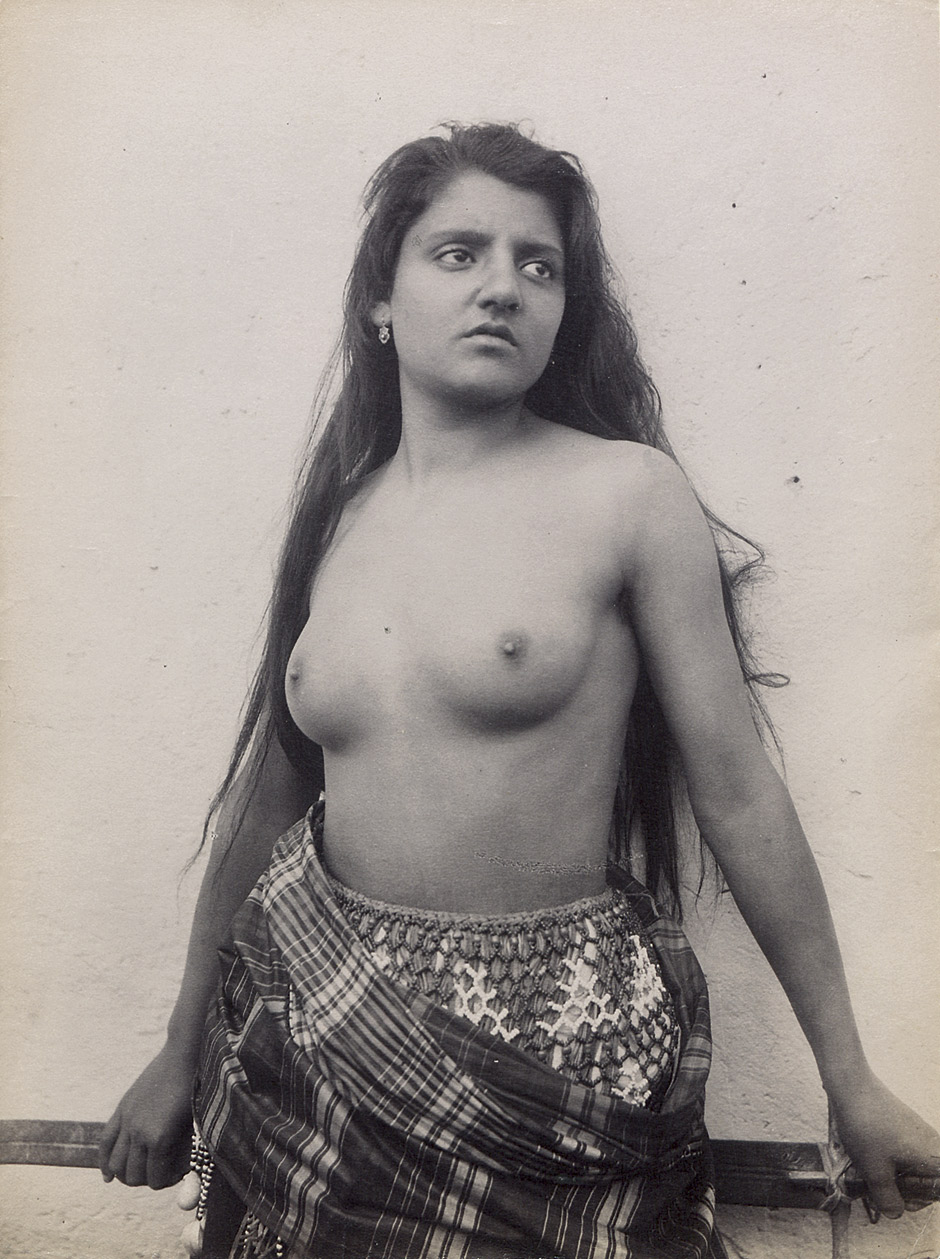
Untitled

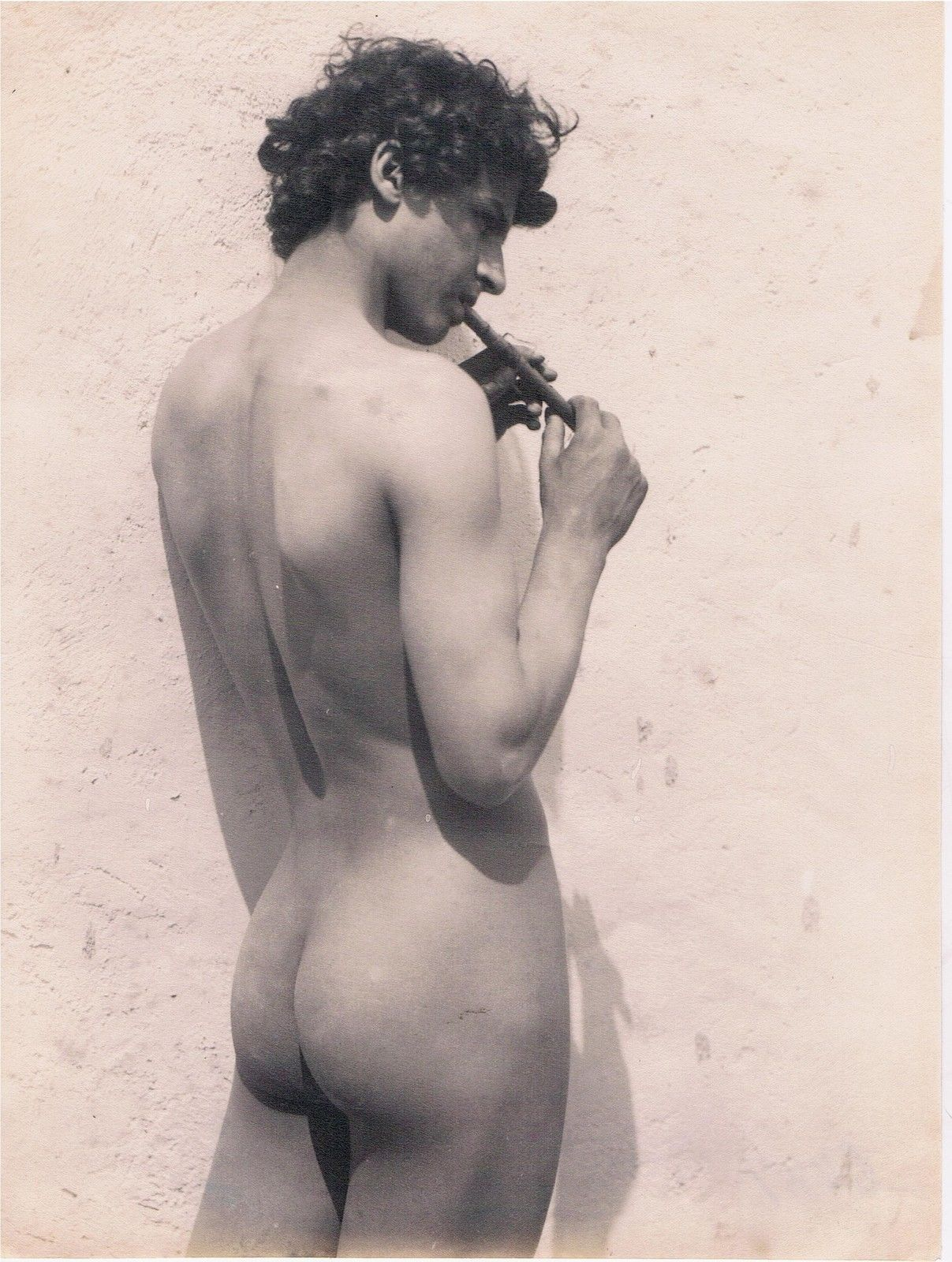
Untitled

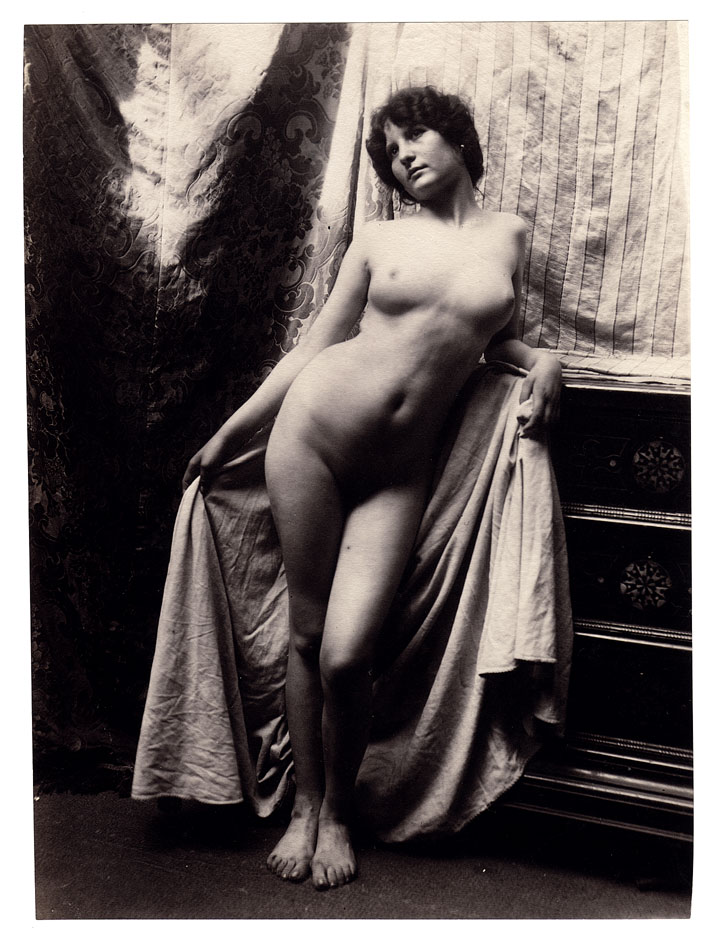
Untitled

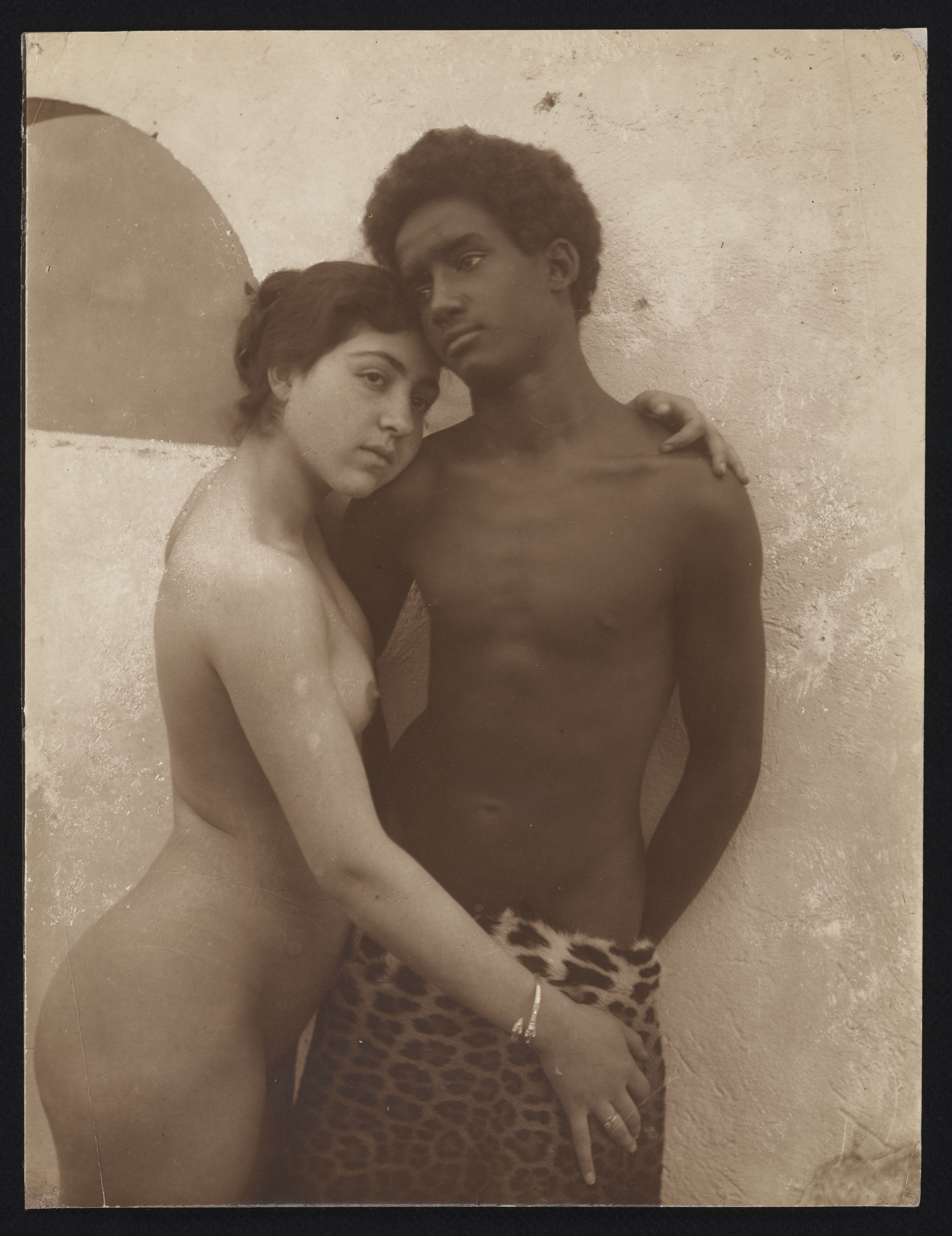
Interracial Couple

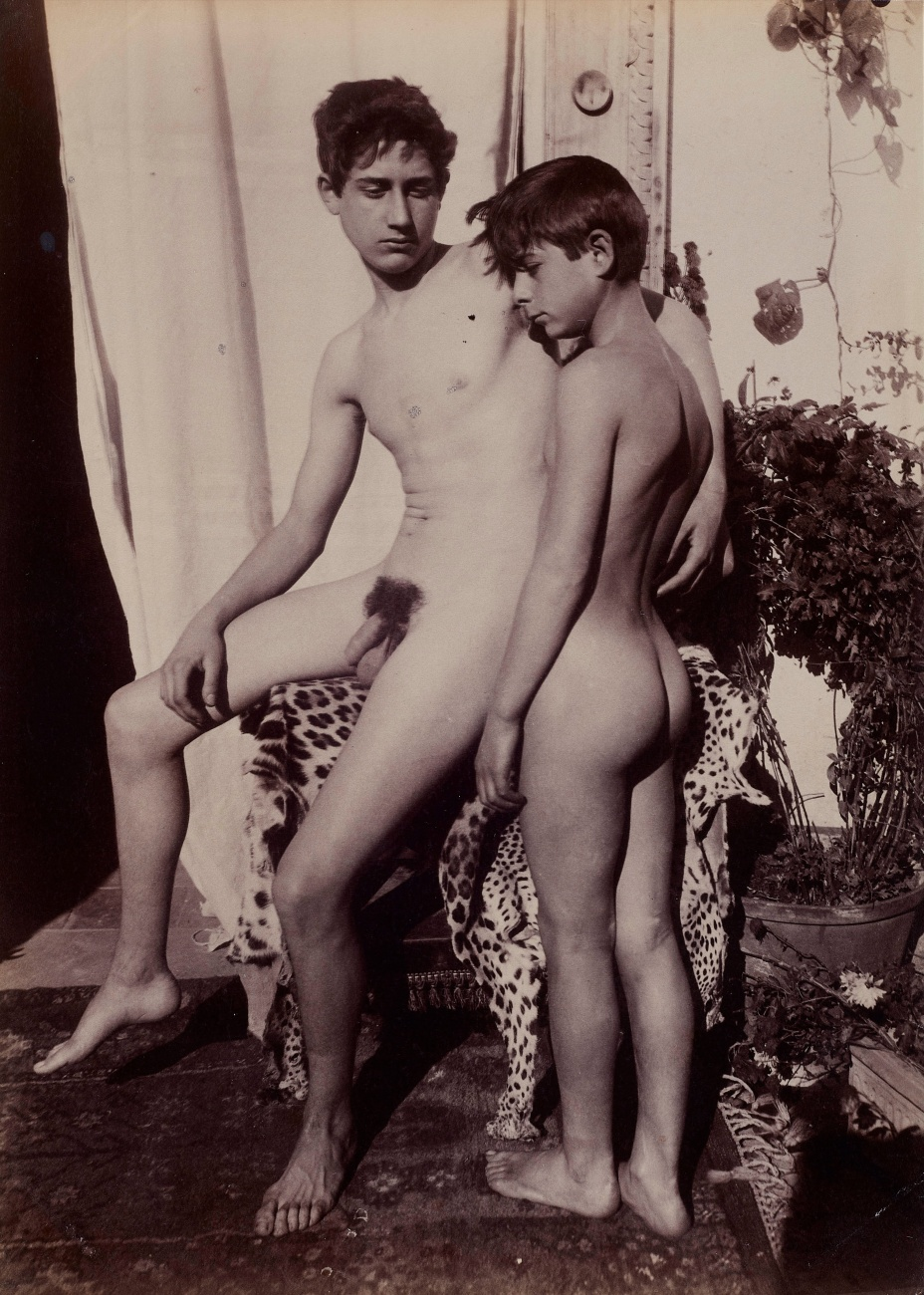
Two Naked Boys Before a Leopard Fur

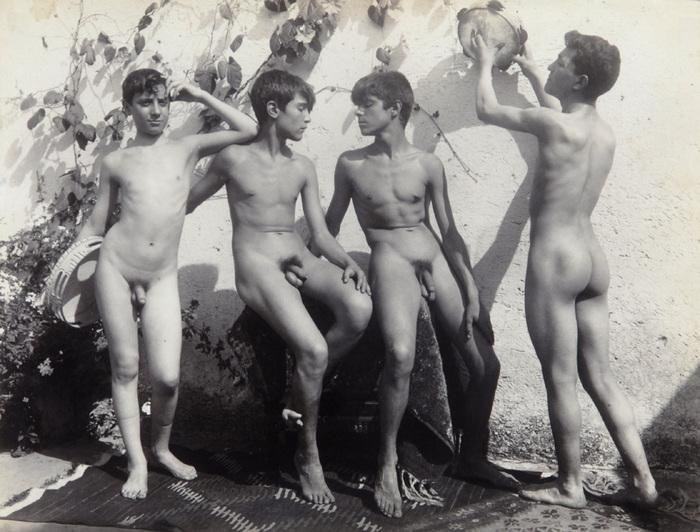
Four Nude Youths on the Terrace in Rome

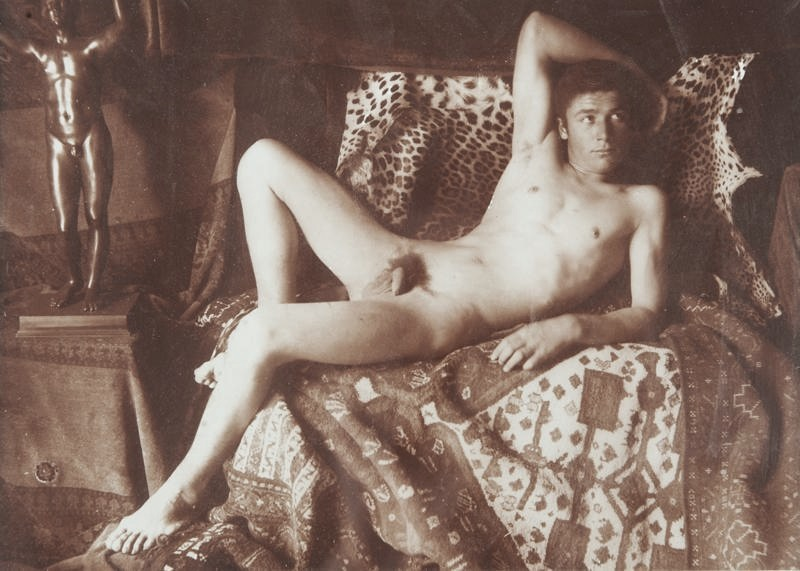
Nude Boy Near a Bronze Statue

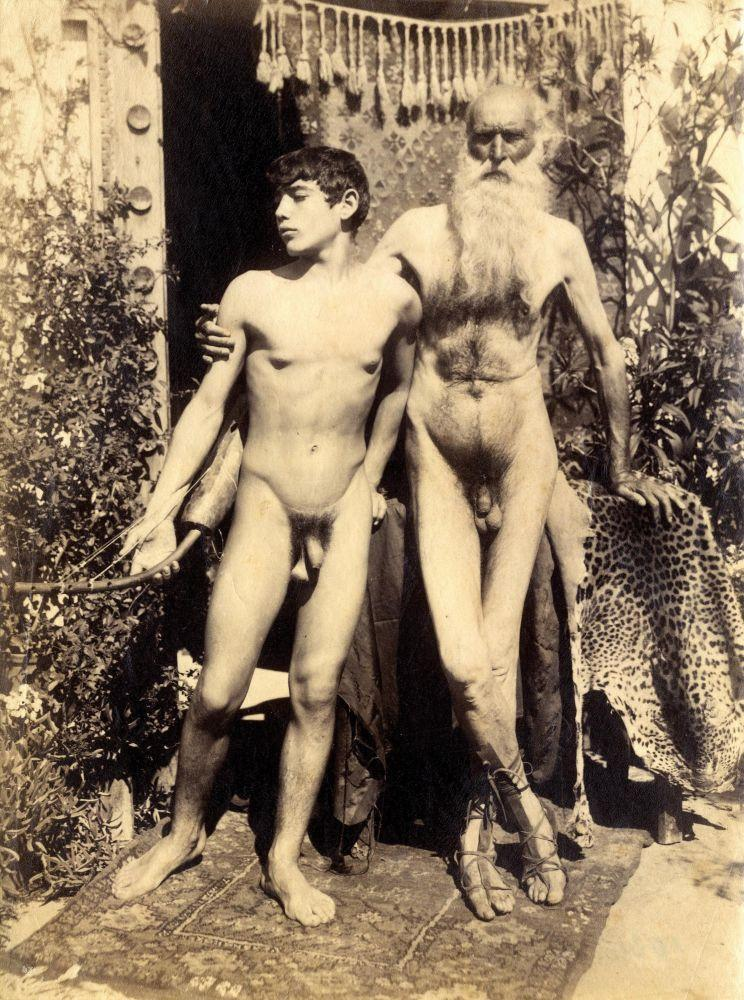
An Old Man and a Youth

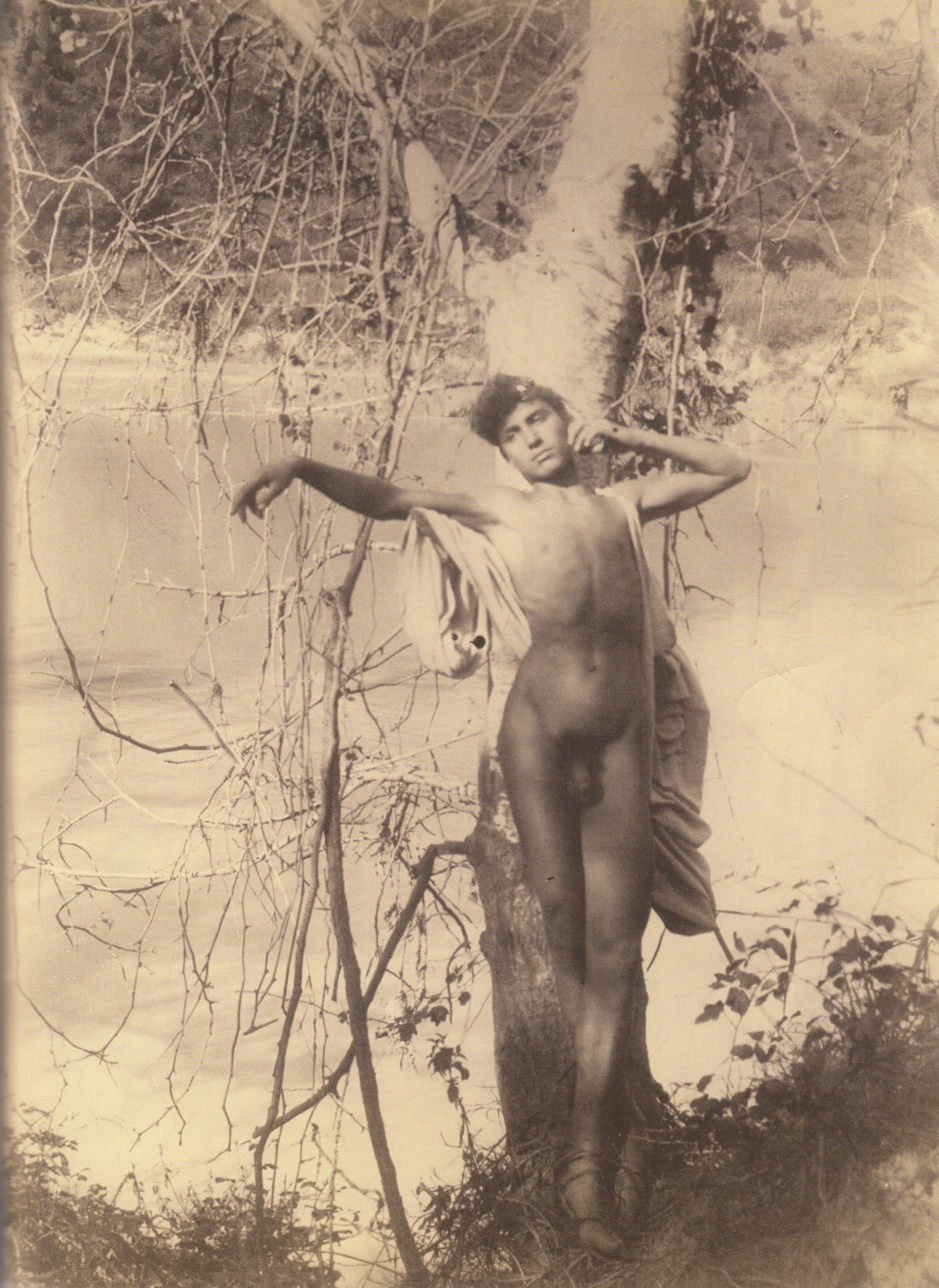
Nude Boy, Leaning on a Tree

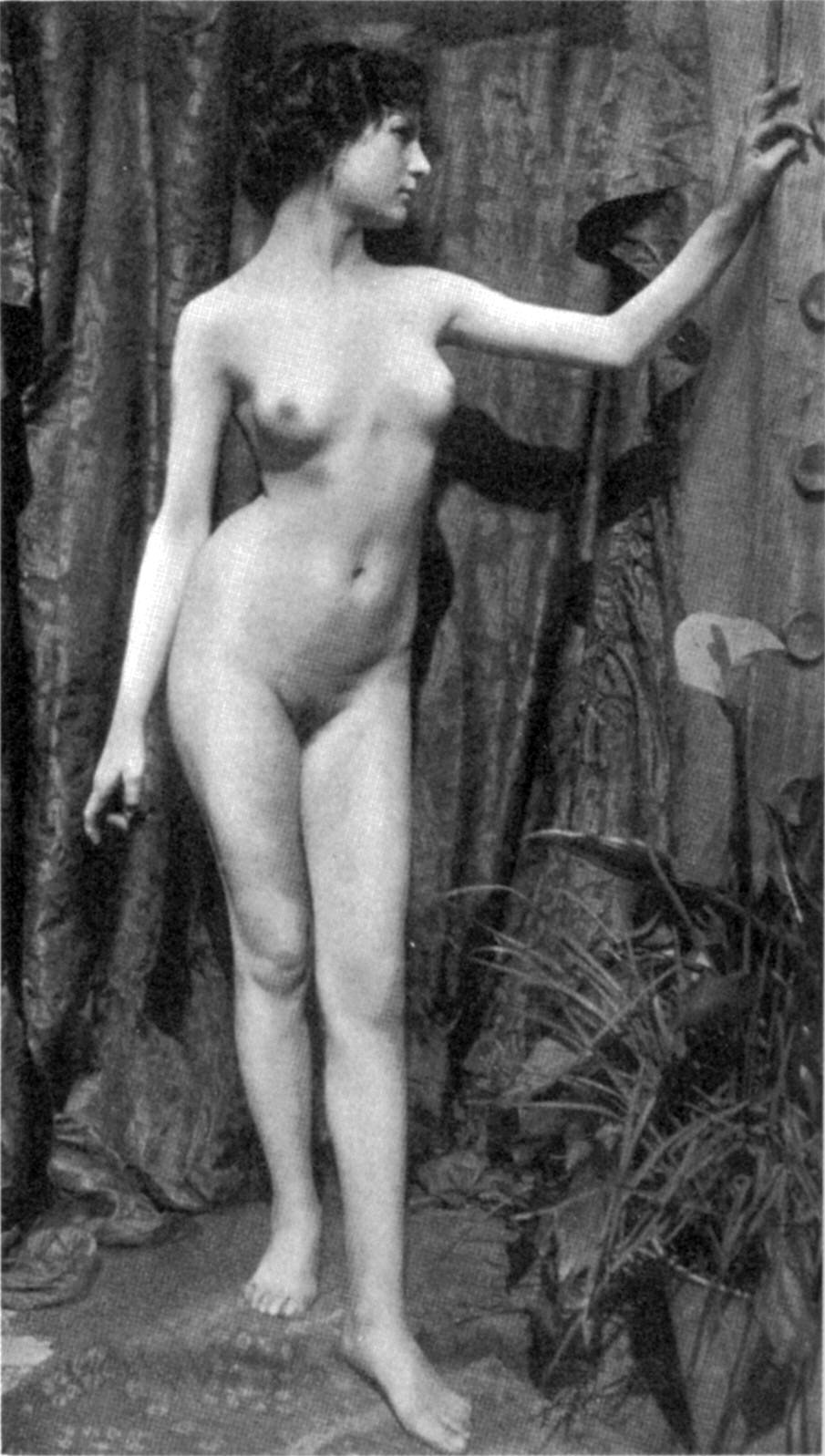
Woman from the Sabinian Mountains, Posing Naked

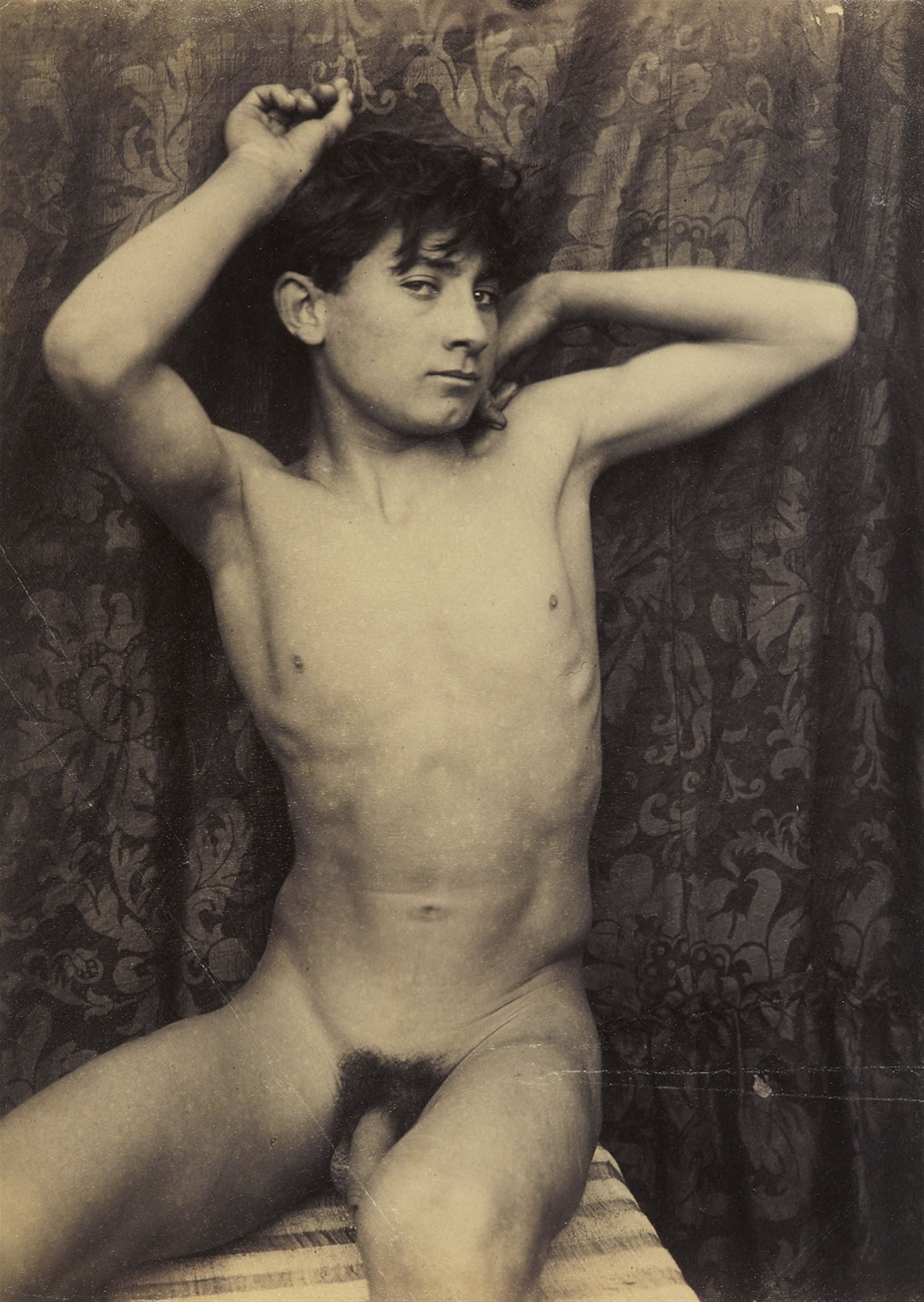
Naked Boy Sitting in Front of a Black Brocade Cloth

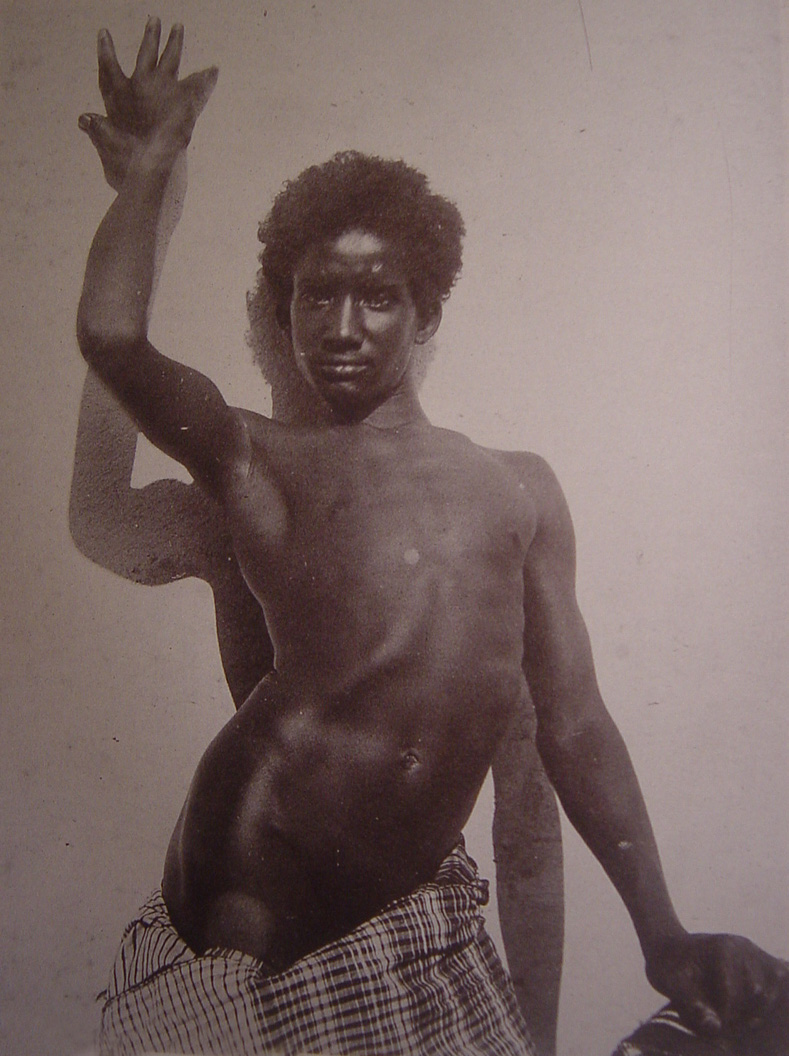
Draped Black Boy, Standing

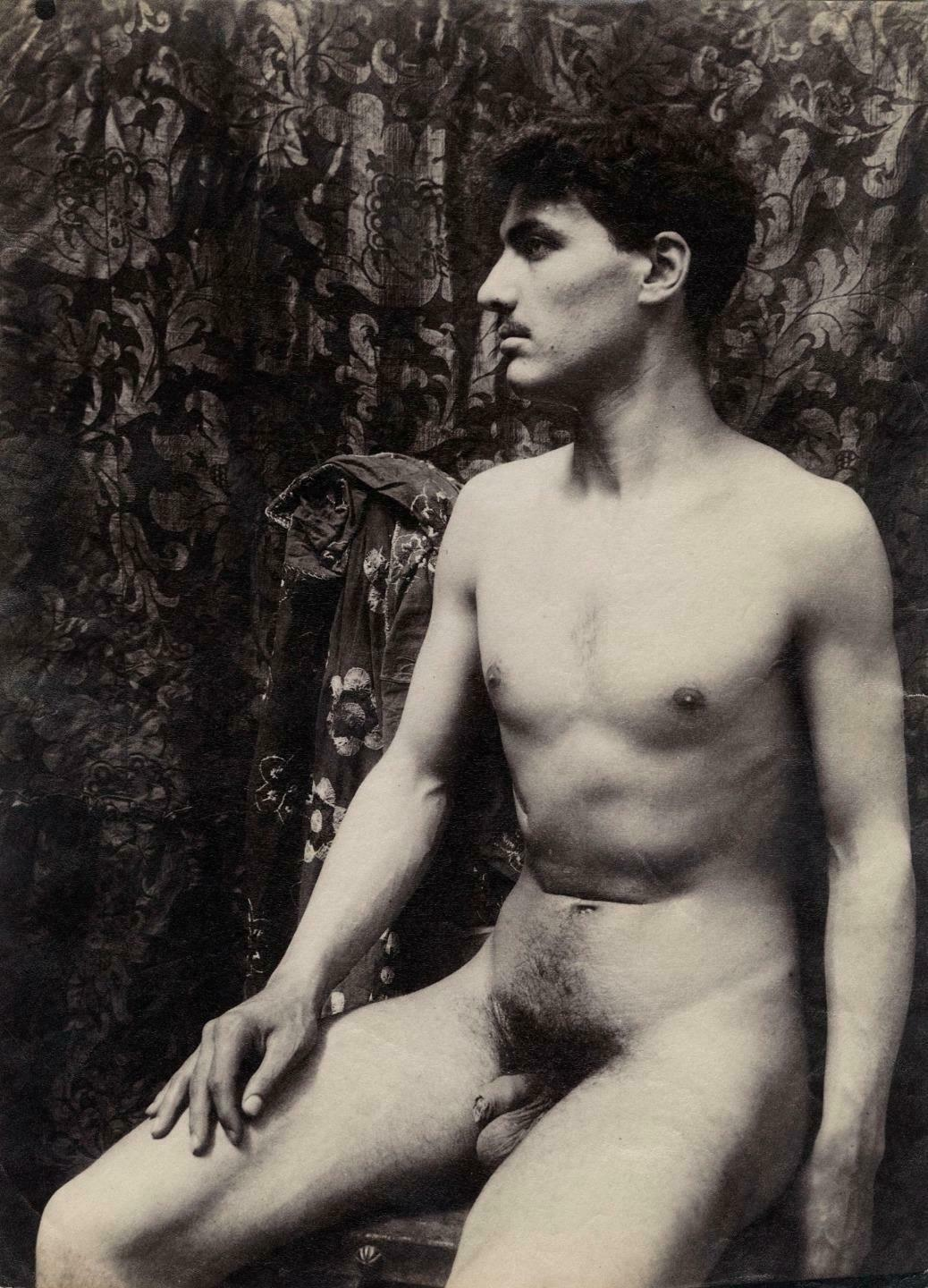
Naked Man Before a Black Brocade Cloth

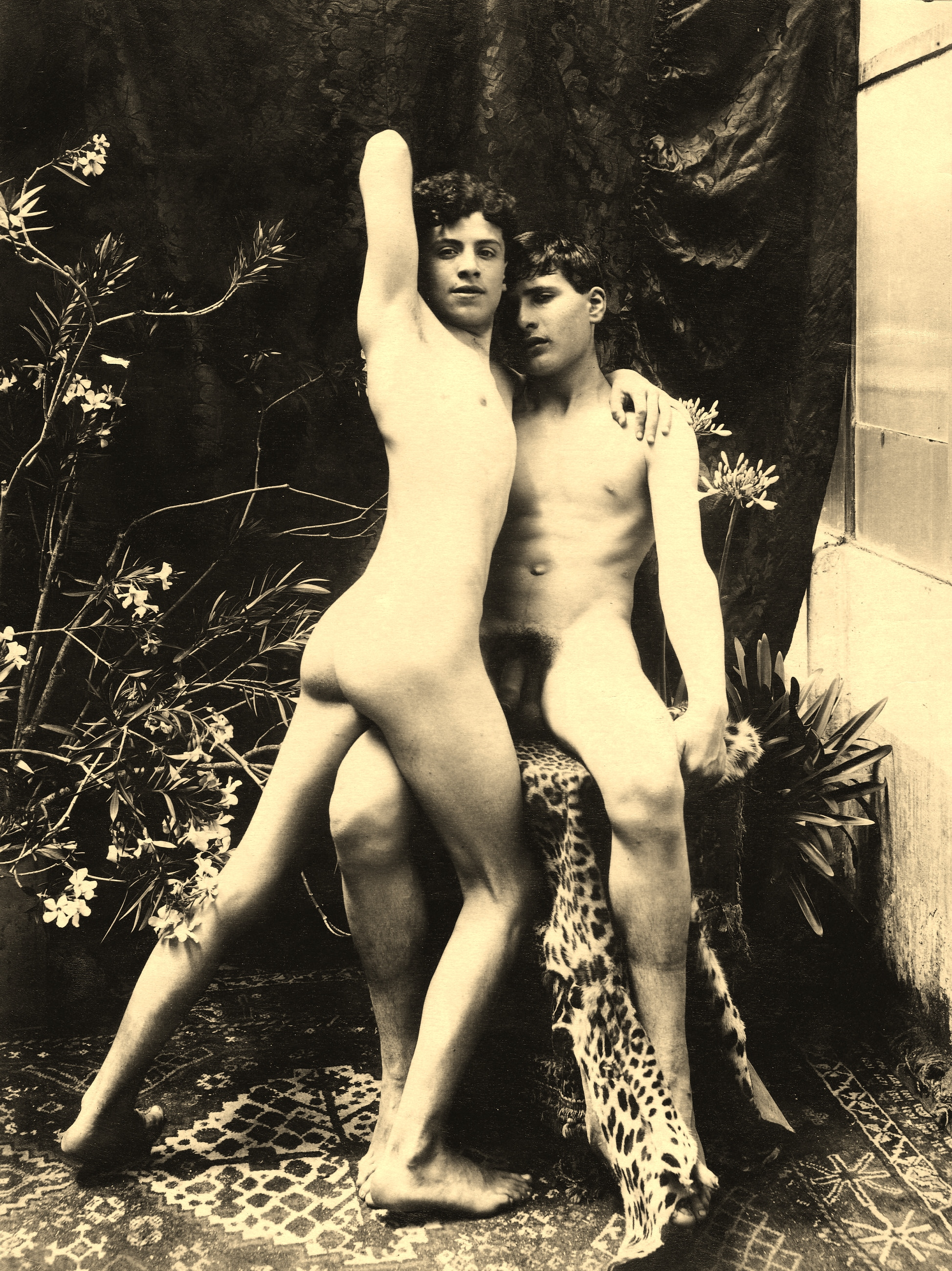
Two Naked Boys, Embracing

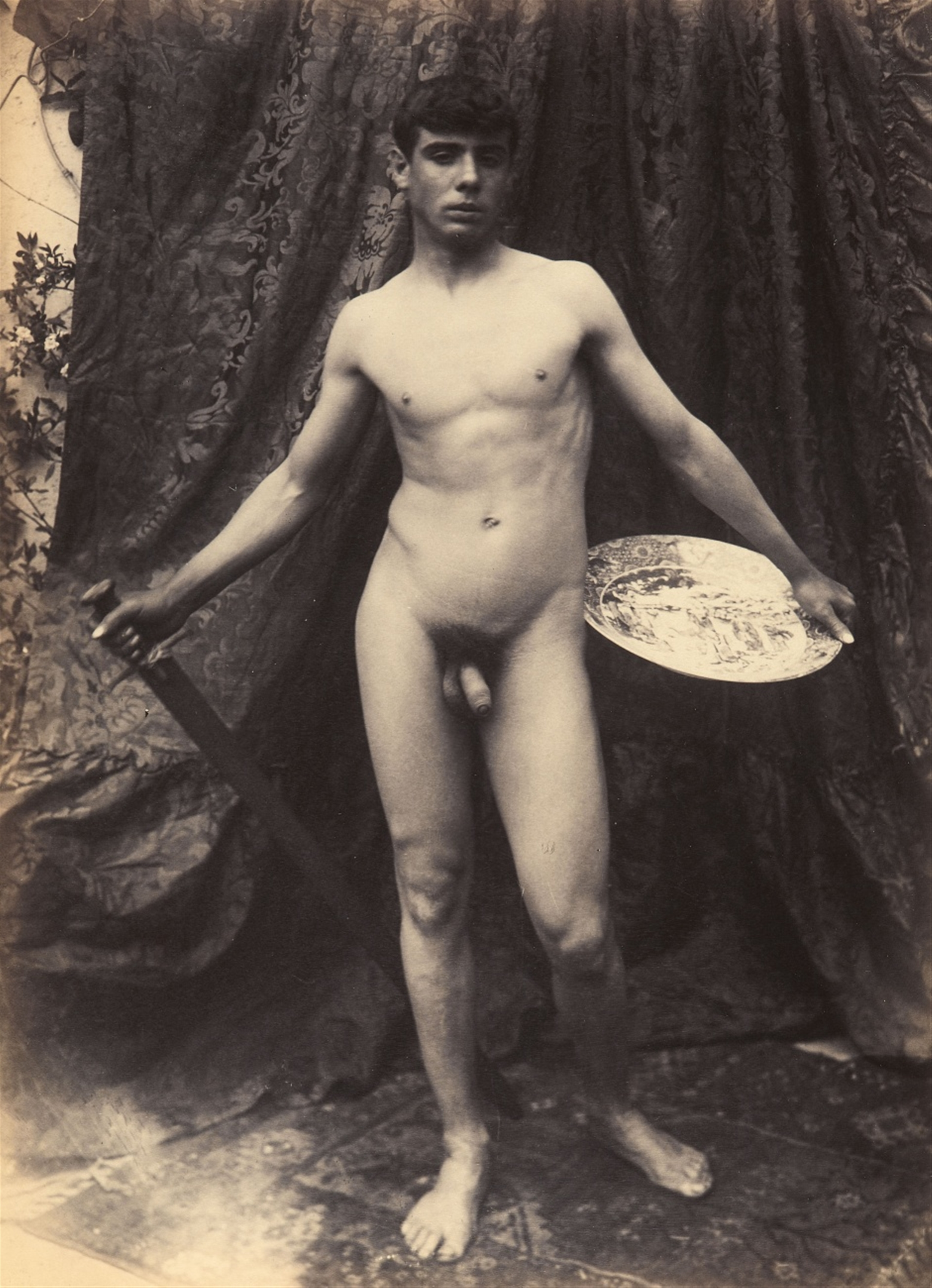
Naked Lad Holding a Sword and a Plate

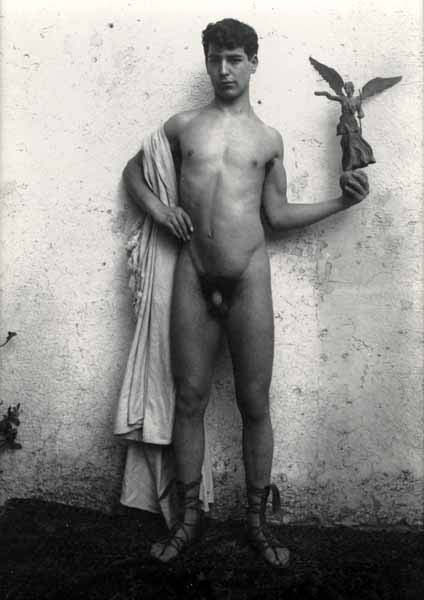
A Youth Holding a Statuette of Nike

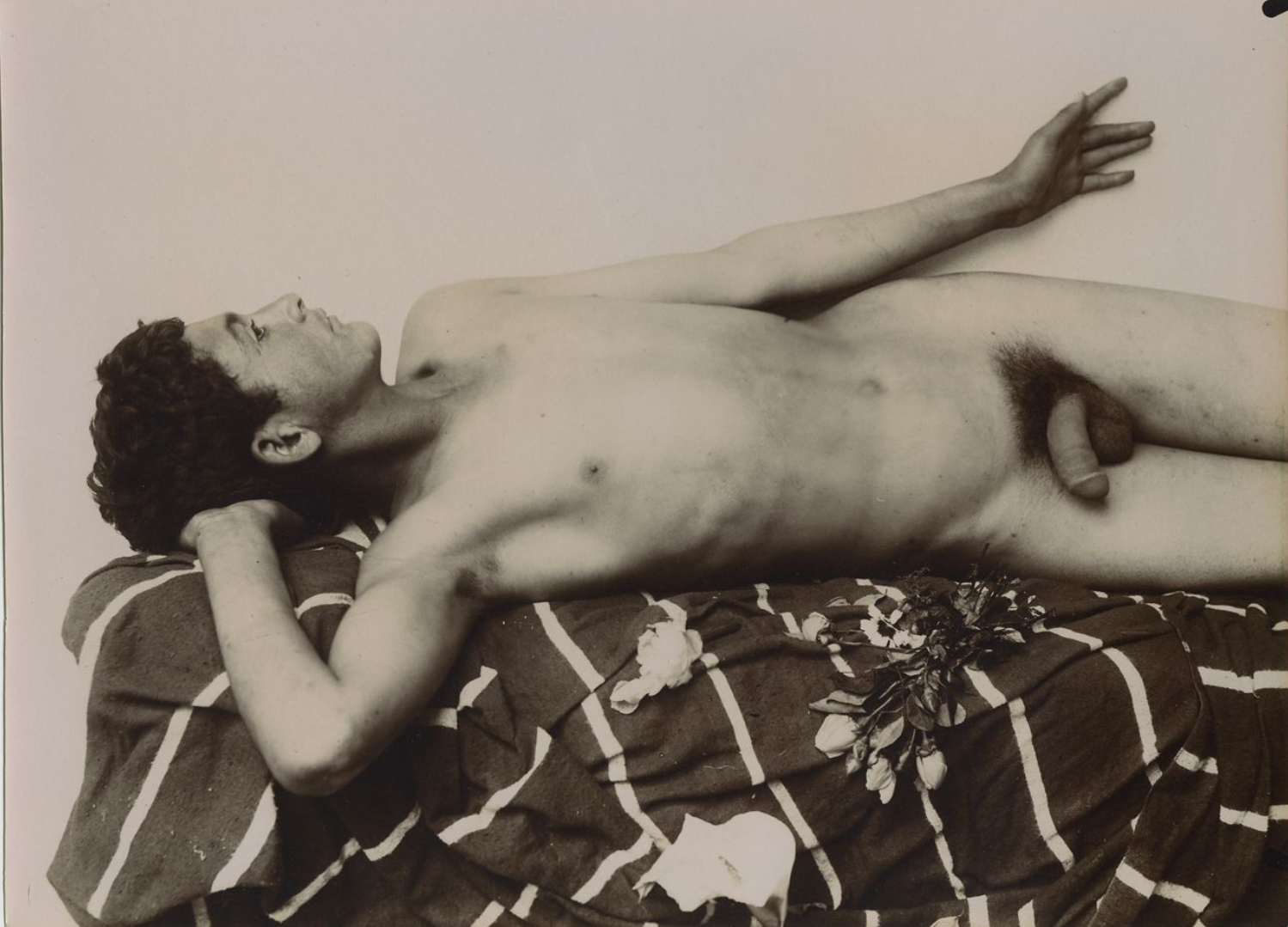
Naked Algerian Boy, Learning on a Black Cloth.

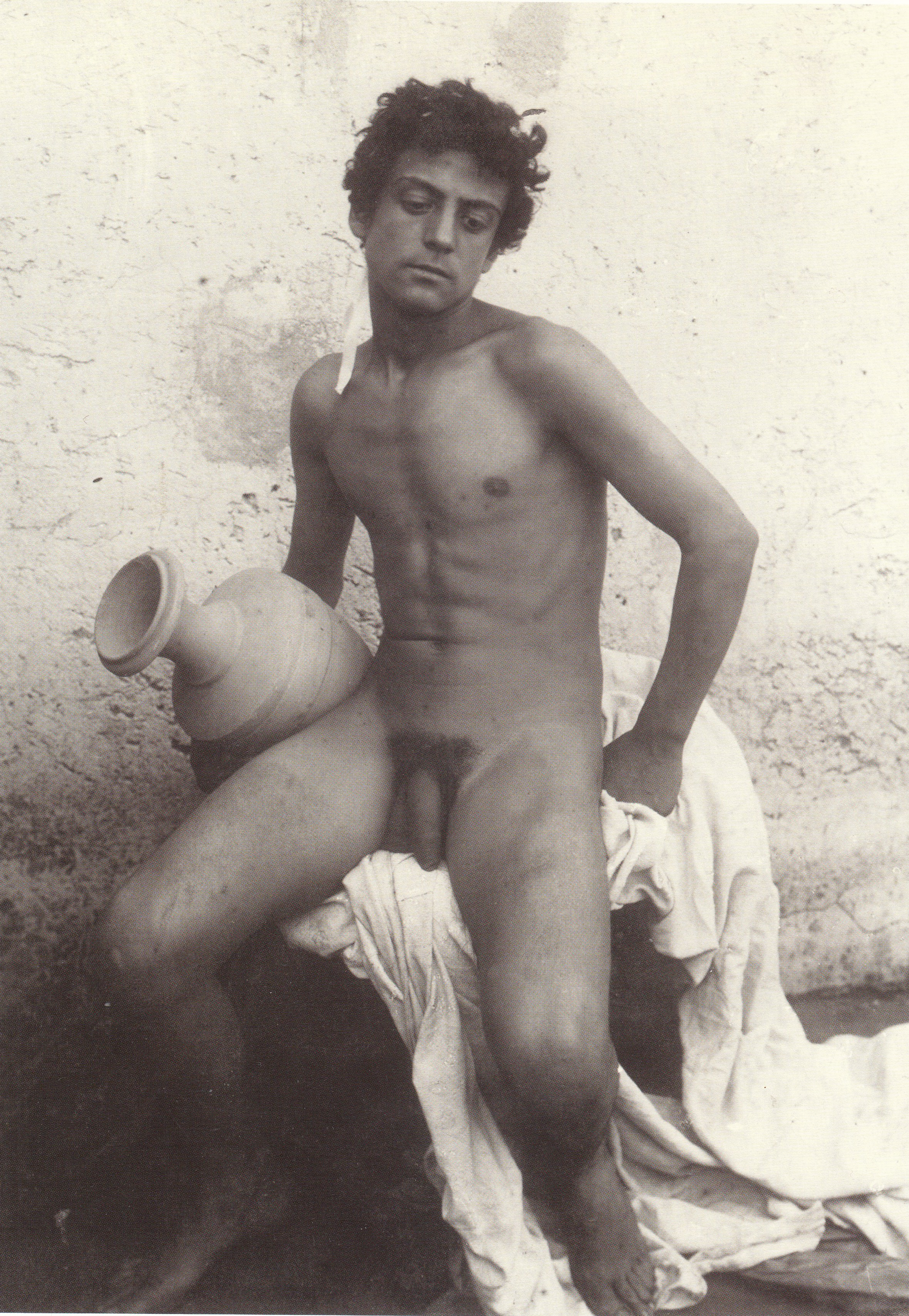
Sitting Naked Boy, Holding an Amphora

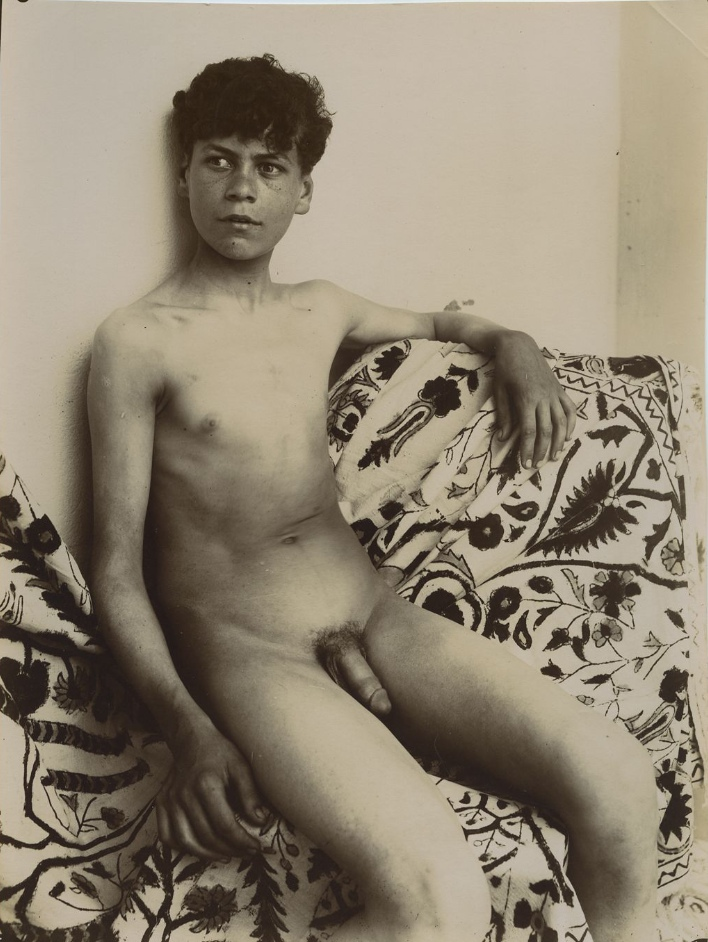
Naked, Sitting Algerian Boy

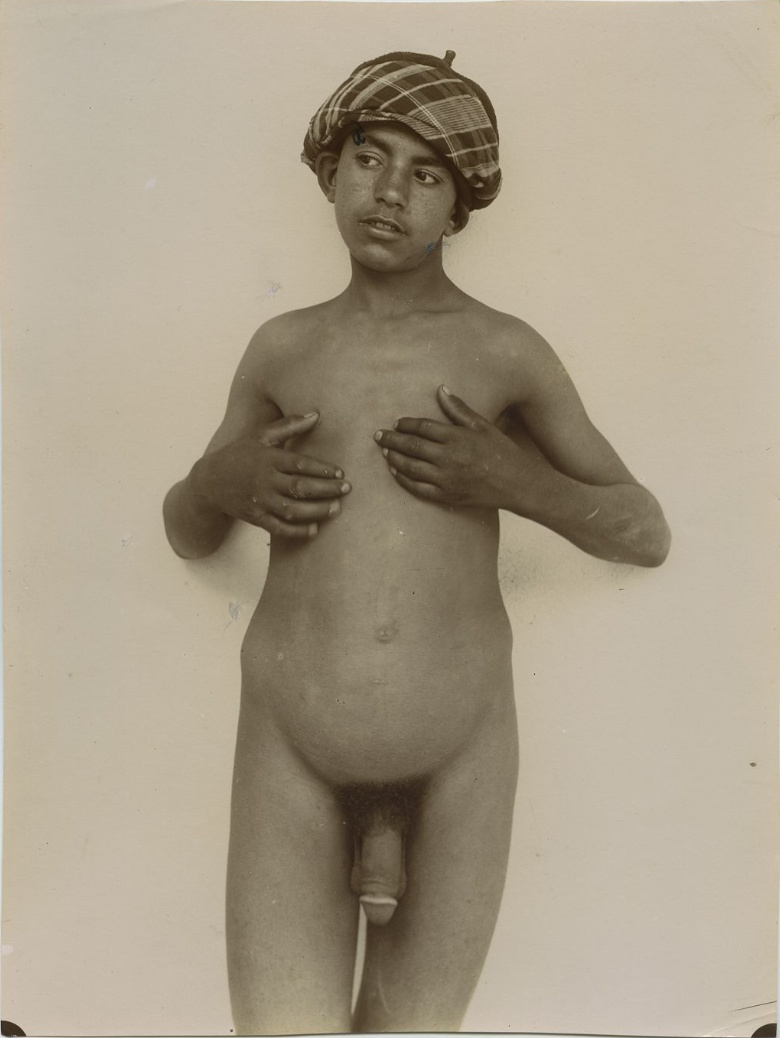
Naked Boy Wearing a Turban.

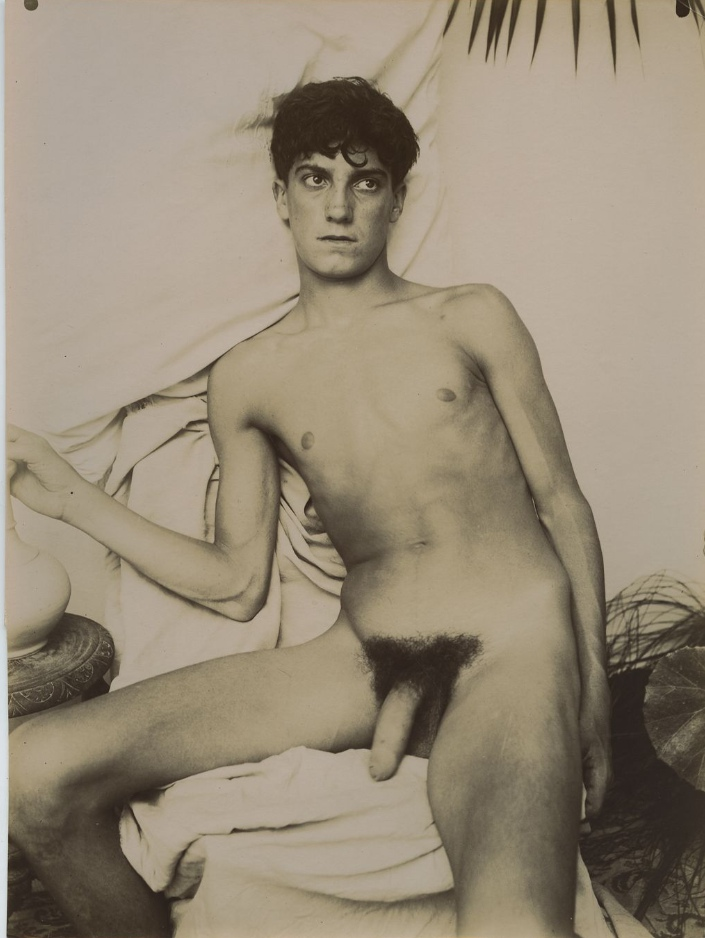
Sitting Algerian Boy

== Literature ==
- Bernhard Albers (ed.), Galdi / Gloeden / Plüschow. Aktaufnahmen aus der Sammlung Uwe Scheid, Rimbaud Presse, Aachen 1993
- Et in Arcadia ego. Fotografien von Wilhelm von Gloeden, Guglielmo Plüschow und Vincenzo Galdi, Edition Oehrli, Zurich 2000
- Volker Janssen (ed.), Wilhelm von Gloeden, Wilhelm von Plüschow, Vincenzo Galdi: Italienische Jünglings-Photographien um 1900, Janssen Verlag, Berlin 1991
- Marina Miraglia, Guglielmo Plüschow alla ricerca del bello ideale, in: "AFT (Archivio Fotografico Toscano)", IV 7, luglio 1988, pp. 62–67
- Ulrich Pohlmann, Wer war Guglielmo Plüschow?, "Fotogeschichte", n. 29, VIII 1988, pp. 33–38.
- Uwe Scheid, Il vero nudo: Aktstudien von Guglielmo Plüschow, "Fotogeschichte" n. 29, VIII 1988, pp. 9–21.
- Peter Weiermair, Guglielmo Plüschow, Taschen verlag, Köln 1994 ISBN 3-8228-9042-1
- Winckelmann (pseud.), A rediscovered boy-photographer. Guglielmo Plüschow (1852-1930), "Gayme" n. III 1, 1996, pp. 22–30.

== Bibliography ==
- Canet, Nicole (editor), von Plüschow, Galdi, von Gloeden - Beautés Siciliennes - Nicole Canet, Paris, 2014.
