= John Dwight =

John Dwight may refer to:

- John Dwight (died 1661), English settler of Dedham, Massachusetts and progenitor of the Dwight family
- John Dwight (manufacturer) (1819–1903), American pioneer manufacturer of bicarbonate of soda
- John Dwight (potter) (died 1703), English Potter
- John Sullivan Dwight (1813–1893), American music critic and Unitarian minister
- John Wilbur Dwight(1859–1928), US politician

== See also ==
- Jonathan Dwight, American ornithologist
