= Timothy Dwight =

Timothy Dwight may refer to:

- Timothy Dwight (Massachusetts politician) (1629–1718), progenitor of the Dwight family
- Timothy Dwight IV (1752–1817), American author and president of Yale University, 1795–1817
- Timothy Dwight V (1828–1916), president of Yale University, 1886–1899
- Tim Dwight (born 1975), American football player
- Timothy Dwight Hobart (1855–1935), businessman

== See also ==
- Timothy Dwight College, a residential college at Yale University
- Timothy Dwight PS 033, a public elementary school in New York City
