= Dwight (given name) =

Dwight is a masculine first name that comes from an English surname which was in turn derived from the medieval feminine name Diot, a diminutive of Dionysia, the feminine form of Dionysios. The name is mainly given in the United States and Caribbean countries.

== Notable people ==
- Dwight D. Eisenhower, (1890–1969), five-star general and 34th President of the United States
- Dwight B. La Du, (1876-1954), American engineer and surveyor in New York
- Dwight L. Moody, American evangelist and publisher
- W. Dwight Pierce (1881-1967), American entomologist
- Dwight York, American musician and imprisoned leader of the Nuwaubian movement

Athletes

- Dwight Anderson, American professional basketball player
- Dwight Anderson, Jamaican-born professional Canadian football player
- Dwight Barnett, Jamaican footballer
- Dwight F. Davis, American tennis player
- Dwight Ferguson, Bahamian sprint athlete
- Dwight Freeney, American football player
- Dwight Gooden, American baseball player
- Dwight Howard, American NBA basketball player
- Dwight McDonald, American football player
- Dwight Peabody, American football player
- Dwight Phillips Jr. (born 2005), American football player
- Dwight Qawi, American boxer
- Dwight White, American football player
- Dwight Yorke, Trinidadian and Tobagonian footballer

Entertainers/artists

- Dwight Schultz, American stage, television and film actor
- Dwight Tosh, American state legislator
- Dwight Twilley, American singer and songwriter
- Dwight Yoakam, American country musician
- Dwight York, American stand-up comedian

== Fictional characters ==
- Dwight (The Walking Dead), in the Walking Dead franchise
- Dwight, the protagonist of Dwight in Shining Armor, a TV series
- Dwight Conrad, a character from Futurama
- Dwight Enys, a doctor in Winston Graham's Poldark novels, who debuts in its second book
- Dwight Fairfield, in the video game Dead by Daylight
- Dwight Hendrickson, in the TV series Haven
- Dwight McCarthy, in Sin City
- Dwight "Dewey" Riley, a lead character in the Scream franchise
- Dwight Schrute, in the American TV show The Office
- Dwight Walker, birth name of Lucious Lyon, in the television series Empire
- Dwight Stifler, in the movie American Pie Presents: The Naked Mile
- Dwight "The General" Manfredi, a lead character in the American crime drama television series Tulsa King
