= Rabe =

Rabe may refer to:

== Places ==
- Rabe, Lesko County, in Subcarpathian Voivodeship (south-east Poland)
- Rabe, Bieszczady County. in Subcarpathian Voivodeship (south-east Poland)
- Rabe (Novi Kneževac), a village in Serbia
- Rabe (crater), on Mars
- 1624 Rabe, an asteroid
- Rabé de las Calzadas, village in Burgos, Castilla-León, Spain

== Other uses ==
- Rabe (surname)
- Broccoli rabe or rapini, a green cruciferous vegetable
- Radio RaBe, a non-commercial community radio station in Berne, Switzerland

== See also ==
- Raabe, surname
- Rahbe, location
