= Wilhelm von Gloeden =

German photographer (1856–1931)

Freiherr Wilhelm von Gloeden
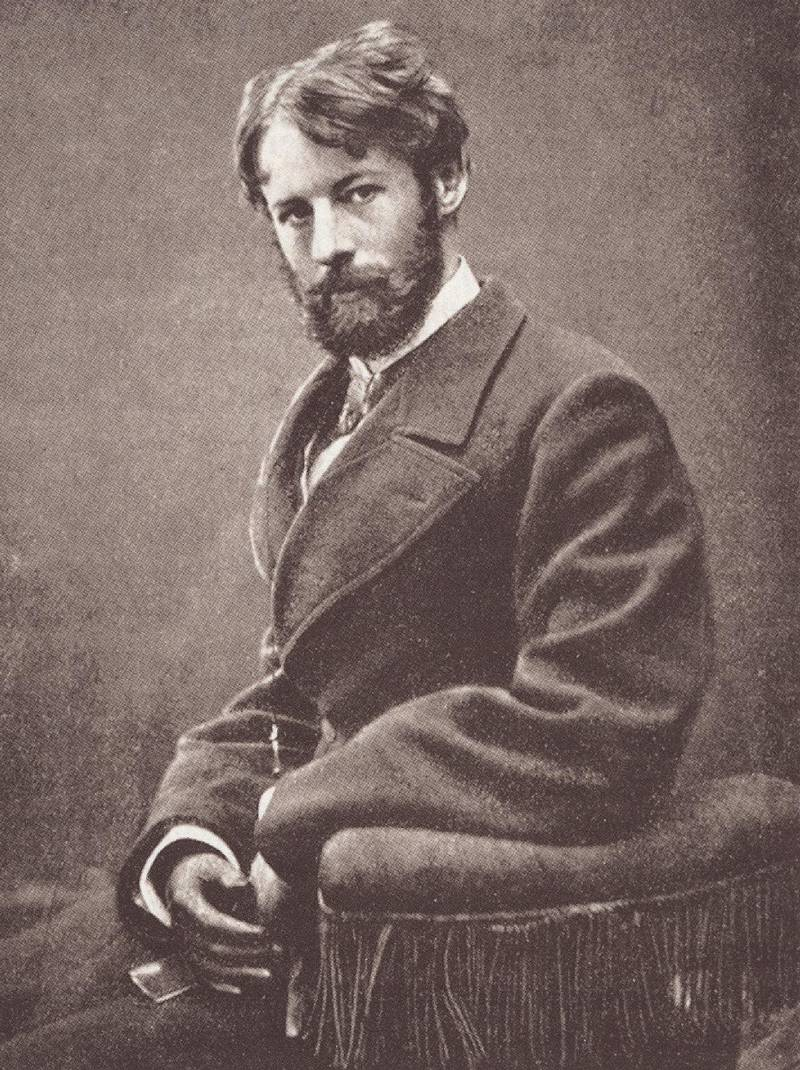
- Wilhelm von Gloeden in 1891
- Born: September 16, 1856; Wismar, Grand Duchy of Mecklenburg-Schwerin
- Died: February 16, 1931 (aged 74); Taormina, Kingdom of Italy
- Known for: Photography
- Notable work: Caino; Hypnos
- Patrons: Oscar Wilde; Friedrich Alfred Krupp; Richard Strauss; Wilhelm II

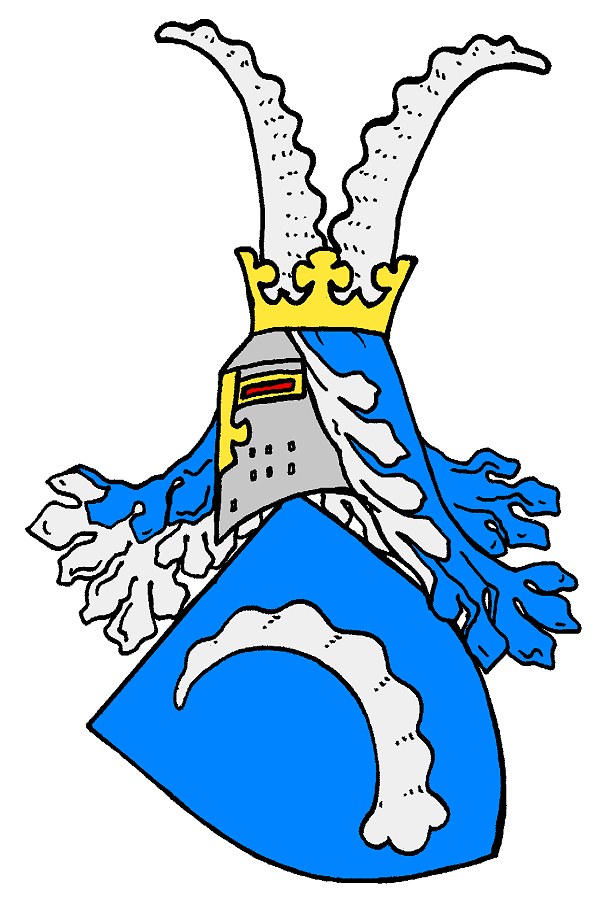
Coat of arms of the Gloeden family

Wilhelm Iwan Friederich August von Gloeden (September 16, 1856 – February 16, 1931), commonly known as Baron von Gloeden, was a German photographer who worked mainly in Italy. He is mostly known for his pastoral nude studies of Sicilian boys, which usually featured props such as wreaths or amphoras, suggesting a setting in the Greece or Italy of antiquity. His innovations include the use of photographic filters and special body makeup (a mixture of milk, olive oil, and glycerin) to disguise skin blemishes.

== Early life ==
Wilhelm von Gloeden was self-invented. He claimed to be the son of an officer and baron from Mecklenburg and gave "Schloss Volkshagen near Wismar" as his place of birth. However, there was no such castle. He was indeed born into a Mecklenburg branch of the German noble family von Glöden, but his title was false: the line of Freiherren von Glöden is well-documented, and he was not a member of the baronial line.

His father was Carl Hermann von Gloeden (1820–1862), who in 1851 was a forest ranger in Volkshagen (today Völkshagen, near Marlow, east of Rostock), and in 1856 became a forest inspector in Dargun. His mother, Charlotte, née Maassen, had previously been married to Johann Magnus Wilhelm Raabe. Gloeden was given a Protestant upbringing.

Hermann von Gloeden was an administrator of the hunting estates of the Grand Duke of Mecklenburg, whose superintendent was an illegitimate son of Frederick Louis, Hereditary Grand Duke of Mecklenburg-Schwerin, and his mistress, Luise Charlotte Ahrens, who had legitimized him by giving him the surname taken from an estate given to his son, the castle (actually a mansion) of Plüschow. His son married Charlotte Wilhemine Crull (1831–1891), the daughter of Hermann von Gloeden's half-sister, and one of their children was the male photographer Wilhelm von Plüschow.

After the death of his father, his mother married for a third time, to Wilhelm Joachim von Hammerstein in 1864. Hammerstein (1838–1904) had been mentored by Carl Hermann von Gloeden, and his forestry career led to him becoming a politician of the German Conservative Party and editor-in-chief of the Kreuzzeitung. Von Gloeden described the relationship with his stepfather as not good. The most important family connection for Wilhelm was his half-sister Sophie Raabe from his mother's first marriage, who lived with him in Sicily for years.

After studying art history in Rostock (1876), Gloeden studied painting under Karl Gehrts at the Weimar Saxon-Grand Ducal Art School (1876–77) until he was forced by lung disease (apparently tuberculosis) to interrupt his studies for a year, convalescing at a sanatorium in the mountain resort of Görbersdorf, now known as Sokołowsko in Poland. Gloeden wrote: "I studied painting at the Academy of fine arts in Weimar under the master Karl Gehrts, but then I fell ill with tuberculosis and had to leave the studio to move to Görbersdorf, where I spent a year."

== Taormina ==
In a search for health, Gloeden travelled to Italy (1877–78), first staying in Naples and visiting Capri before moving on to Taormina in Sicily. He lodged at the Hotel Vittoria before buying a house near San Domenico Convent (Chiesa di Sant'Agata (Taormina)). Apart from the period 1915–18, during the First World War, when he was forced to leave Italy to avoid internment as an enemy alien, he remained in Taormina until his death in 1931. Gregory Woods, scholar of LGBT studies, credited von Gloeden with transformative powers: "Largely as a consequence of his photographs' popularity, the town became a tourist resort with good hotels." Edward Chaney, an expert on the evolution of the Grand Tour and of Anglo-Italian cultural relations, described the town as attracting "male refugees from more repressive climates".

The mayor of the town from 1872 to 1882 was the German landscape painter Otto Geleng (1843–1939), who had moved there in 1863. Through him, Gloeden became acquainted with the local inhabitants. He set up his photographic studio at first as a hobby and was exhibiting his work internationally by 1893 (London), including Cairo (1897), Berlin (1898–99, including a solo exhibition), Philadelphia (1902), Budapest & Marseilles (1903), Nice (1903 & 1905), Riga (1905), Dresden (1909), and Rome (World Fair 1911). His well-known study of two young boys clinging to an Ionic column was published in The Studio (London) in June 1893 (above a nude study by Baron Corvo of Cecil Castle, cousin of Charles Kains Jackson), which brought his work to the notice of a wider public.

In 1895, when his family's fortune was lost through the "Hammerstein affair", Gloeden received as a gift from his friend and patron, the Grand Duke of Mecklenburg-Schwerin, a large-format plate camera. Soon his work brought him visitors from Europe, including royalty, industrialists, artists, and writers (Oscar Wilde visited in December 1897). In 1930, Gloeden ceased work as a photographer and sold his house on the Piazza San Domenico in return for an annuity and residence rights.

Gloeden scrupulously shared the proceeds of his sales with his models. The names of some of them are known: Pasquale Stracuzzi (known as "Pasqualino"); Vincenzo Lupicino (known as "Virgilio" & seen in the "Boy with Flying Fish" photographs); Peppino Caifasso or Carafasso (who posed as "Ahmed"); Pietro Caspano or Capanu; Nicola Scilio, also spelt Sciglio; Giuseppe De Cristoforo; and Maria Intelisano (niece of the parish priest of nearby Castelmola).

The legends that Gloeden was a pupil of his cousin Plüschow, or of Crupi himself, are groundless, as it was Gloeden himself who wrote that he learned the technique of photography (very difficult at the time) from Bruno. This does not mean that Gloeden underwent an intense period of experimentation in close contact with these two photographers, in a sort of teamwork whose results ended up with a certain indifference in the catalog of both associates. During his stay in Taormina, Gloeden had a Bohemian lifestyle and exploited the impoverished locals with his wealth and resources. He frequently held midnight orgies with the youths who worked for him, some of whom were still adolescents. The extent of these revelries remains unknown.

== Works ==
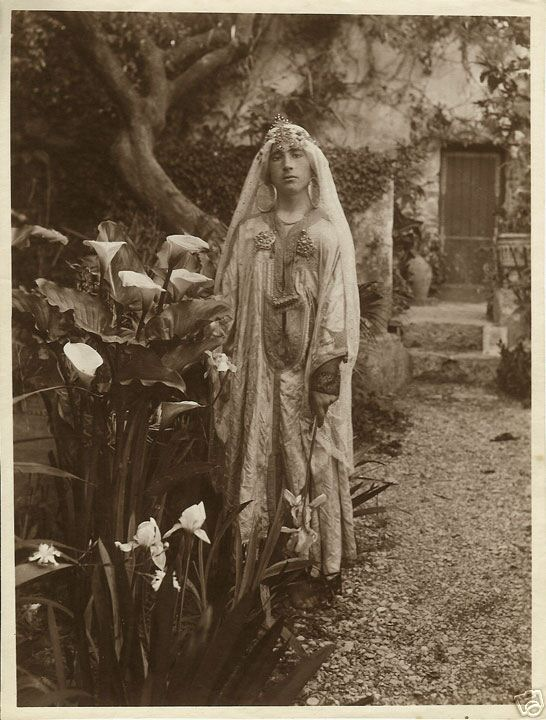
Boy disguised as an odalisque in Gloeden's garden in Taormina. The reverse bears the stamp of Gloeden's heir, Pancrazio Buciunì, and the date: May 16, 1914

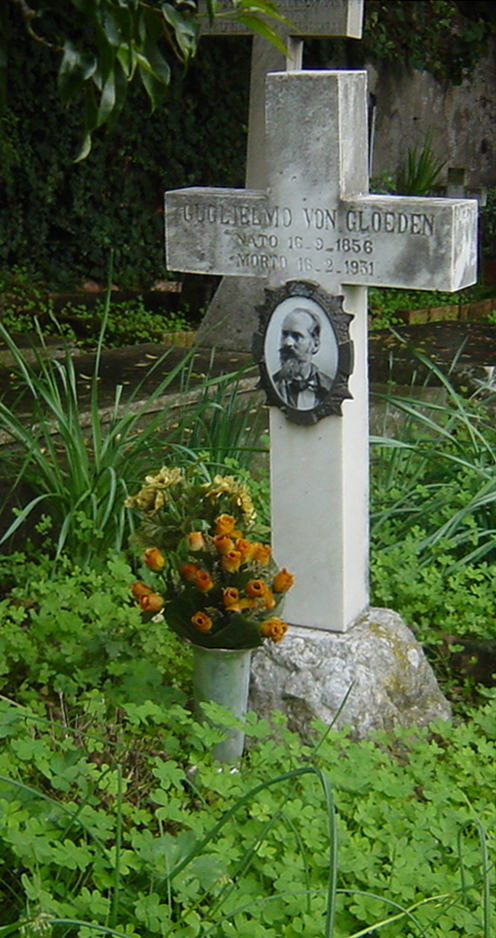
Burial Place of von Gloeden in Taormina

While today Gloeden is mainly known for his nudes and is considered "one of the founders of modern homosexual iconography", in his lifetime he was also famous for his landscape photography that helped popularize tourism to Italy. In addition, he documented damage from the 1908 Messina earthquake, which may explain why the locals mostly approved of his work.

The majority of Gloeden's pictures were made before the First World War, in the years from 1890 to 1910. During the war, he had to leave Italy. After returning in 1918, he photographed very little but continued to make new prints from his voluminous archives. In total, he took over 3000 images (and possibly up to 7000), which after his death were left to one of his models, Pancrazio Buciunì (also spelled Bucini; his dates are sometimes given as c. 1864 – c. 1951 but probably should be 1879–1963), known as Il Moro (or U Moru) for his North African looks. Il Moro had been Gloeden's lover since the age of 14, when he had first joined his household. In 1933, some 1,000 glass negatives from Gloeden's collection (inherited by Buciuni) and 2,000 prints were confiscated by Benito Mussolini's Fascist police under the allegation that they constituted pornography and were destroyed; another 1,000 negatives were destroyed in 1936, but Buciuni was tried and cleared at a court in Messina (1939–1941) of disseminating pornographic images. Most of the surviving pictures (negatives and prints) are now in the Fratelli Alinari photographic archive in Florence (which in 1999 bought 878 glass negatives and 956 vintage prints formerly belonging to Buciuni to add to its existing collection of 106 prints) and further prints (which fetch hundreds of pounds at auction) are in private collections or held by public institutions such as the Civico Archivo Fotographico in Milan.

=== Attitudes towards his work during his lifetime and later ===
Gloeden generally made several different kinds of photographs. The ones that garnered the most widespread attention in Europe and overseas were usually relatively chaste studies of peasants, shepherds, fishermen, etc., featured in clothing like togas or Sicilian traditional costumes, and which generally downplayed their homoerotic implications. He also photographed landscapes, and some studies were of, or included, women. His models were usually posed either at his house, among the local ancient ruins, or on Monte Ziretto, located two kilometres to the north of Taormina and famous in antiquity for its quarries of red marble. He wrote in 1898: "The Greek forms appealed to me, as did the bronze-hued descendants of the ancient Hellenes, and I attempted to resurrect the old, classic life in pictures...The models usually remained merry and cheerful, lightly clad and at ease in the open air, striding forward to the accompaniment of flutes and animated chatter. More than a few greatly enjoyed the work and anxiously awaited the moment when I would show them the finished picture."

Most of Gloeden's photographs depict boys aged 10 or above. In almost all of his work, the genital areas of the boys are very prominently displayed. In some, the boys' postures suggest that their genitals are the main focus. Some of the boys, such as Pieto Mazza, were photographed nude throughout their teens and beyond, which is clearly visible through their pubic hair and penile growth. More explicit nude photographs of boys and occasionally older men that, because of eye contact or physical contact, were more sexually suggestive were traded "under the counter" and among close friends of the photographer, but according to Ulrich Pohlmann: "as far as is known, Gloeden's archive contained neither pornographic nor erotically lascivious motifs".

== Other similar photographers at the time ==
Gloeden's cousin Guglielmo Plüschow also photographed male nudes, working in Rome. Plüschow was already a firmly established photographer when Gloeden started doing photographs of his own in the early 1890s. Gloeden soon eclipsed Plüschow, and later works by Plüschow often were erroneously attributed to Gloeden.

== Gallery ==
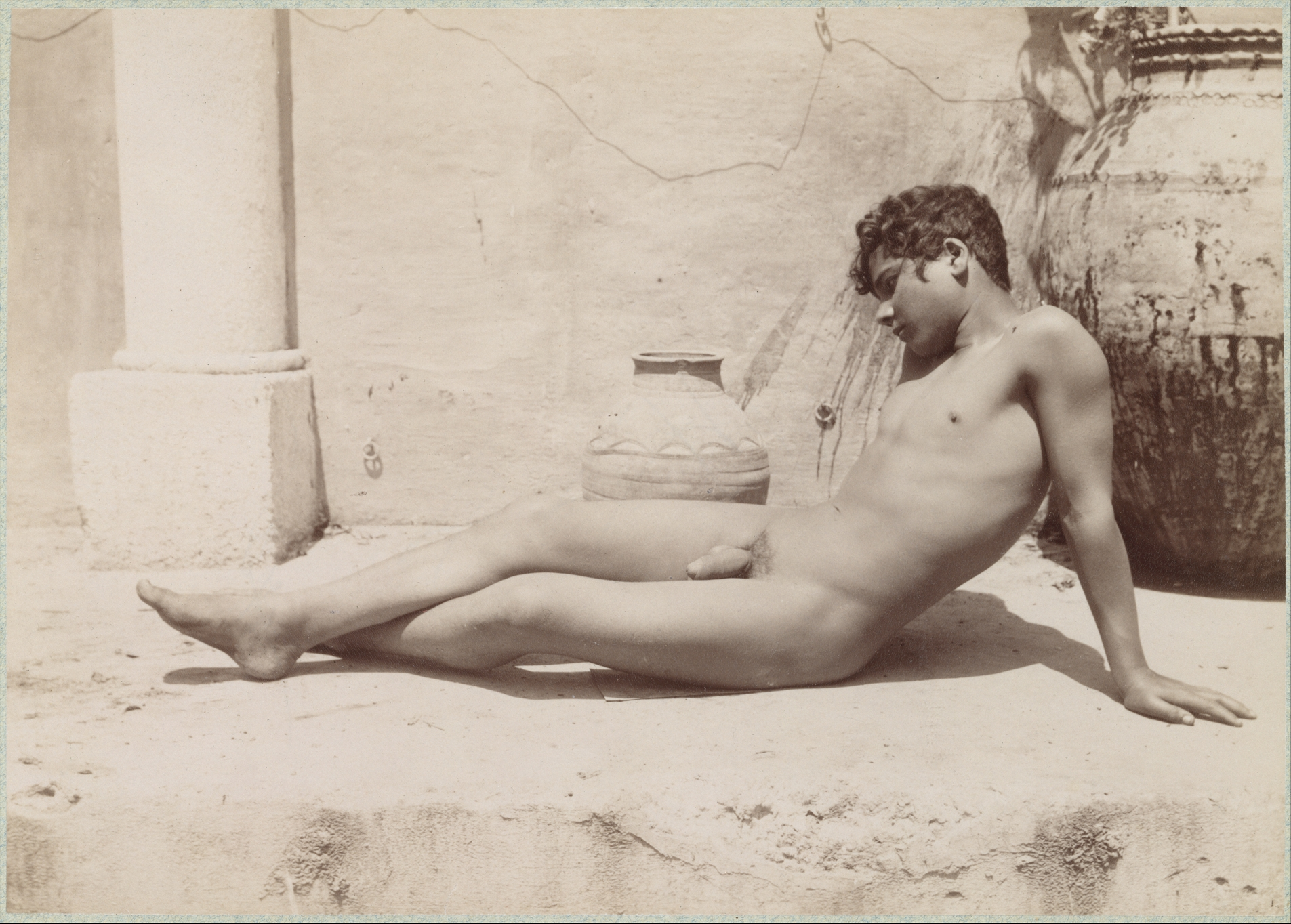
Reclining Male Nude Beside Vase at the Metropolitan Museum of Art

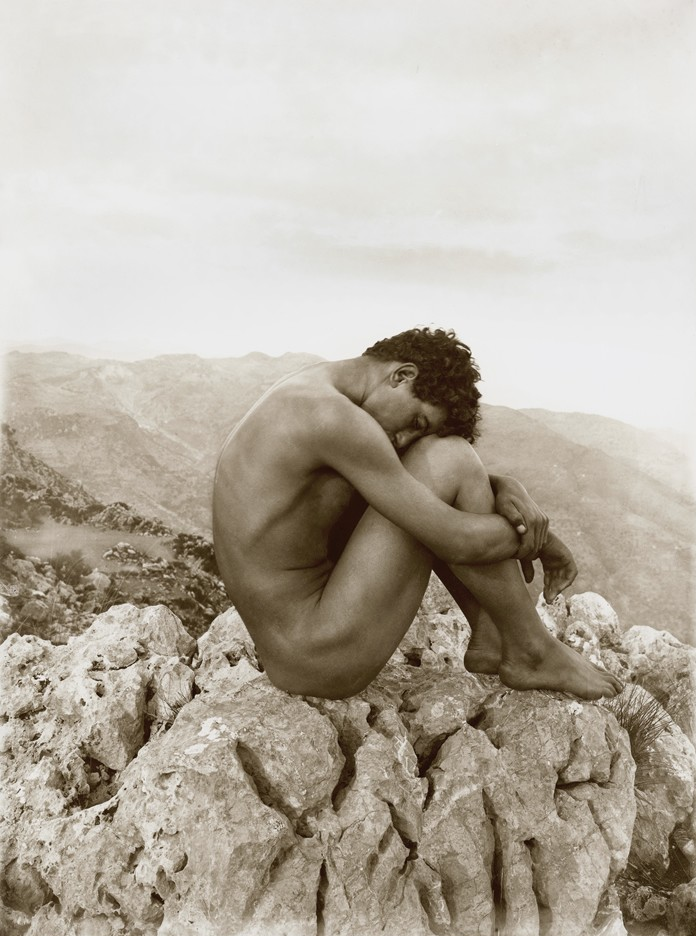
Cain

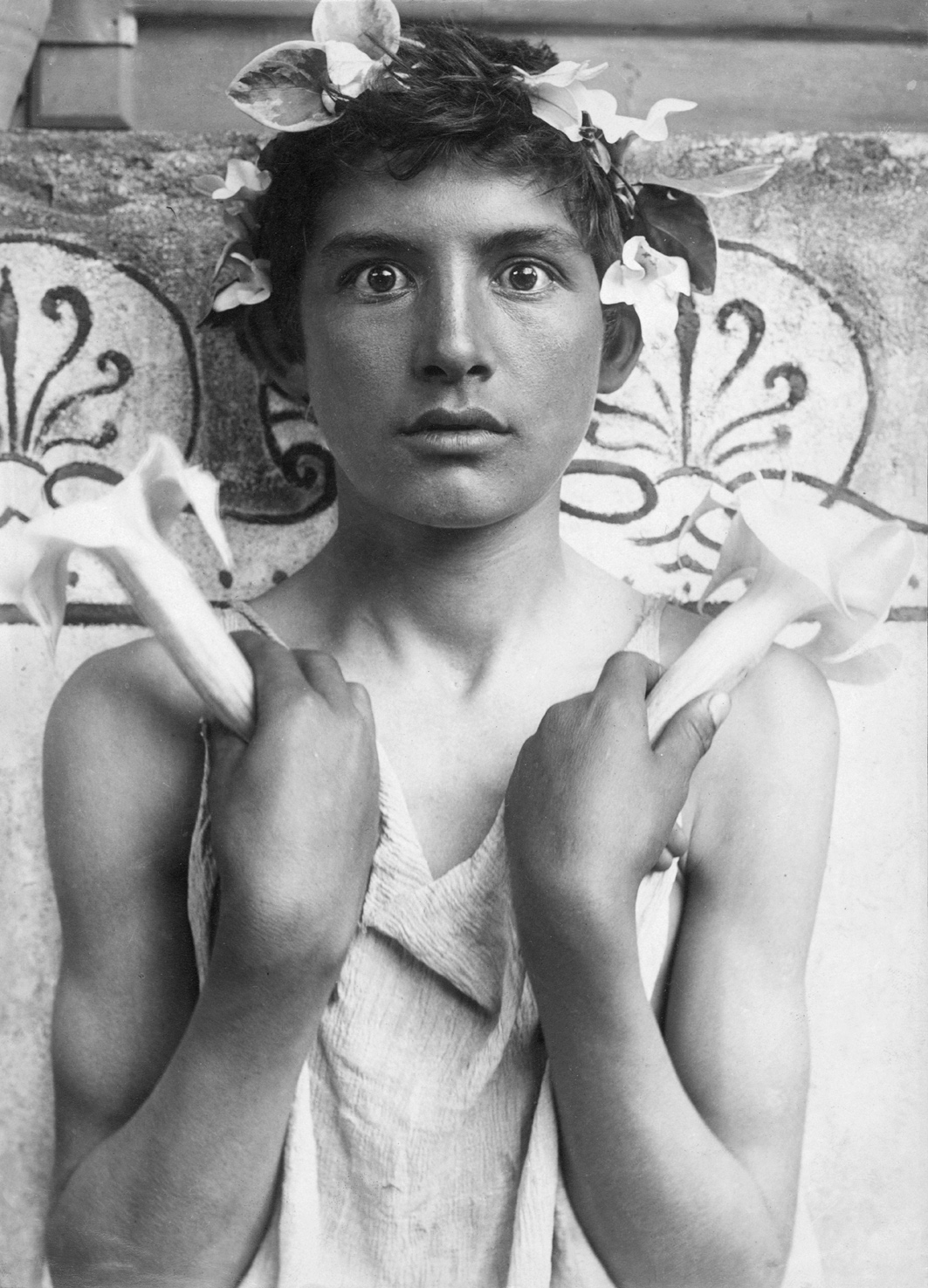
Hypnos

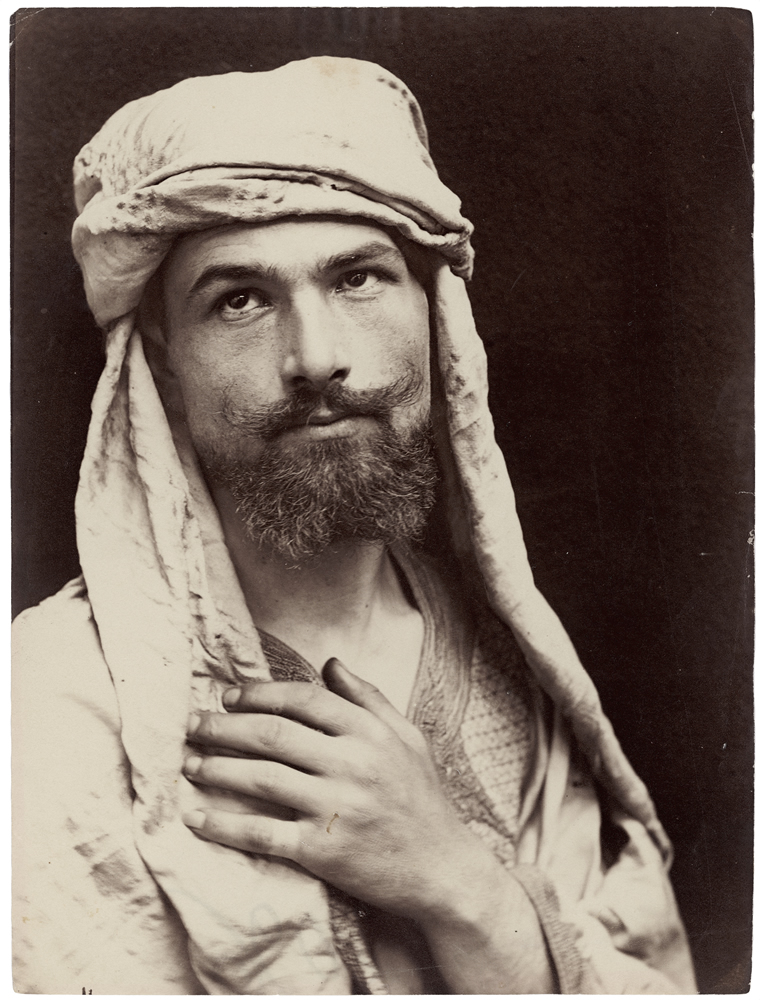
Self-portrait in Arab garb

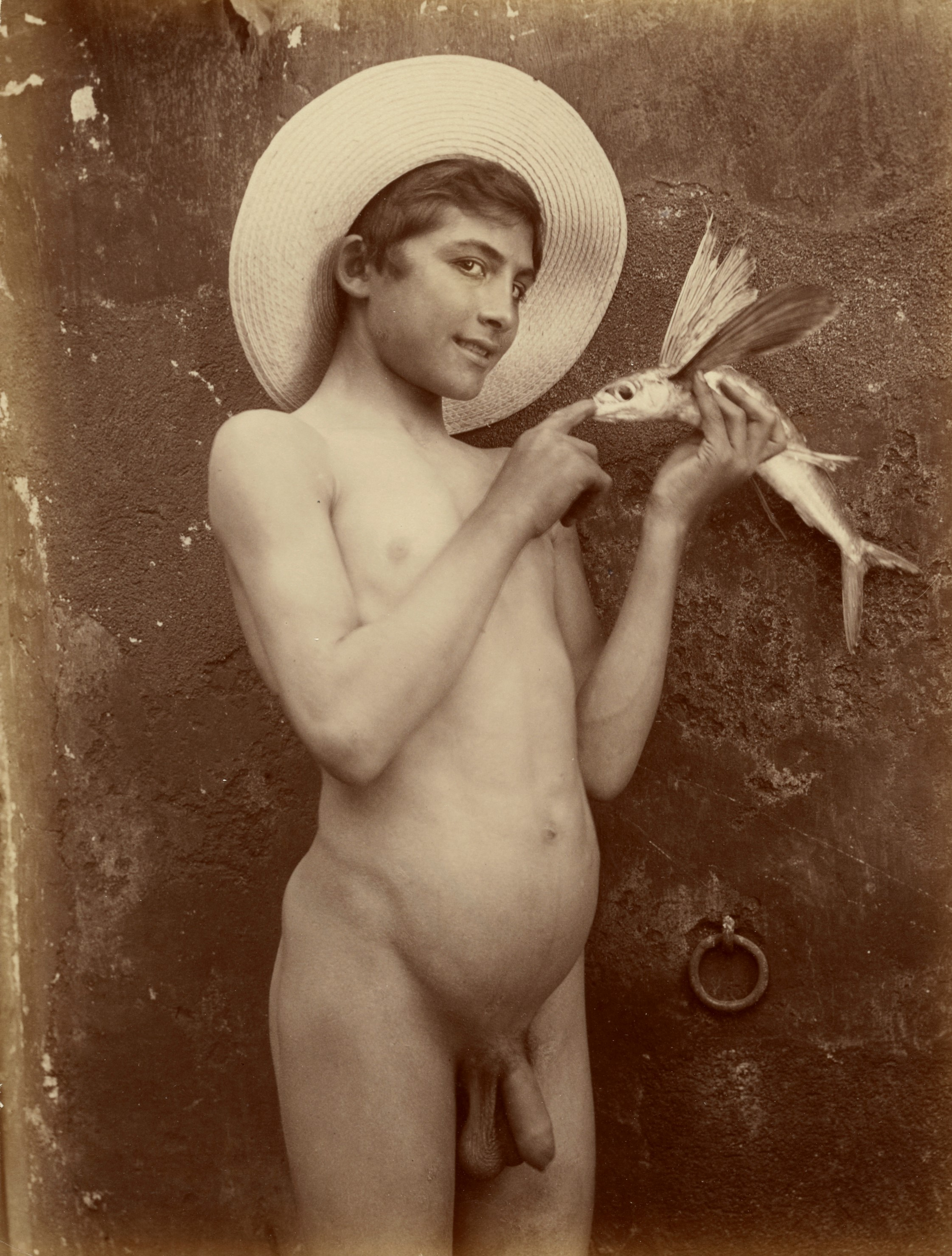
Boy with Flying Fish

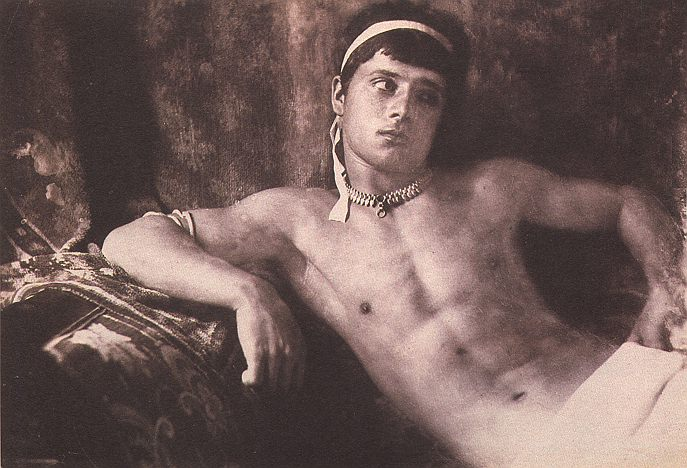
Neopolitan Boy Wearing Jewels and a Headband

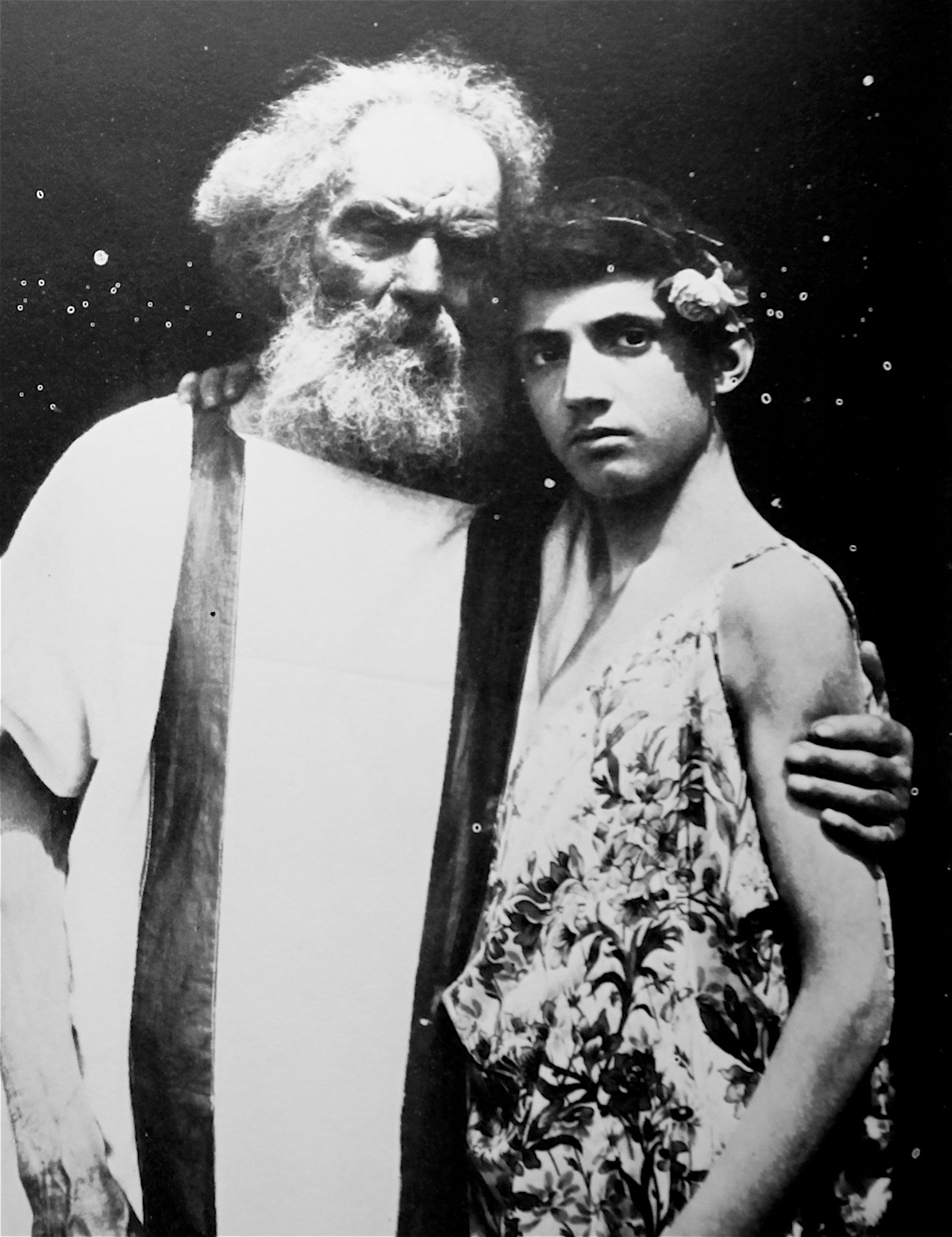
An old man and a boy wearing Ancient Greek-like clothes

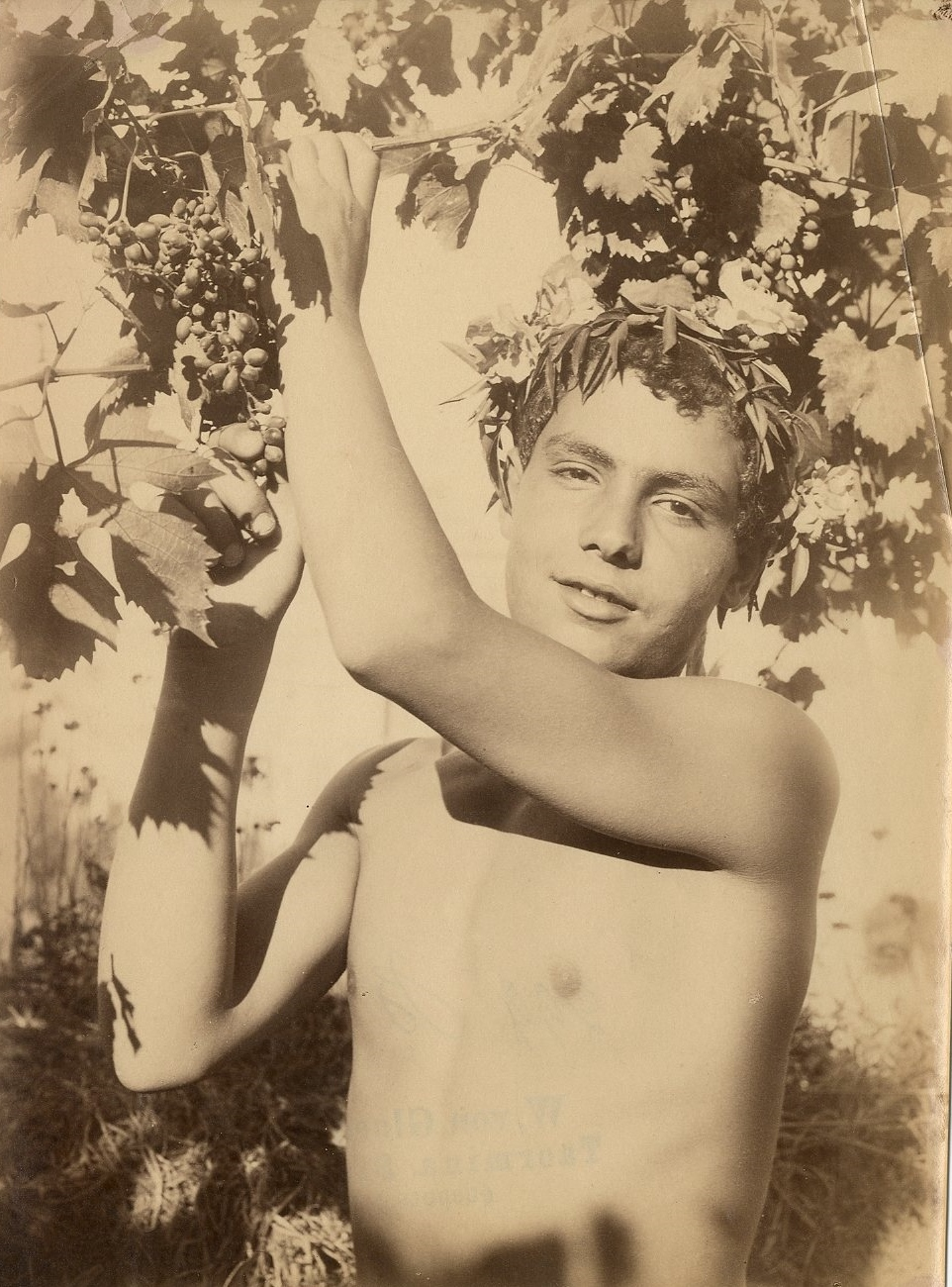
Boy posing as Bacchus

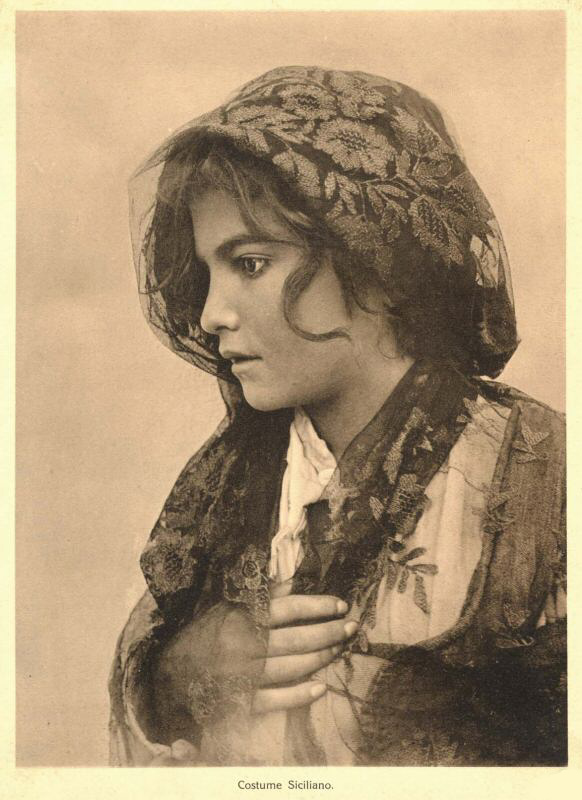
Boy dressed as Sicilian girl

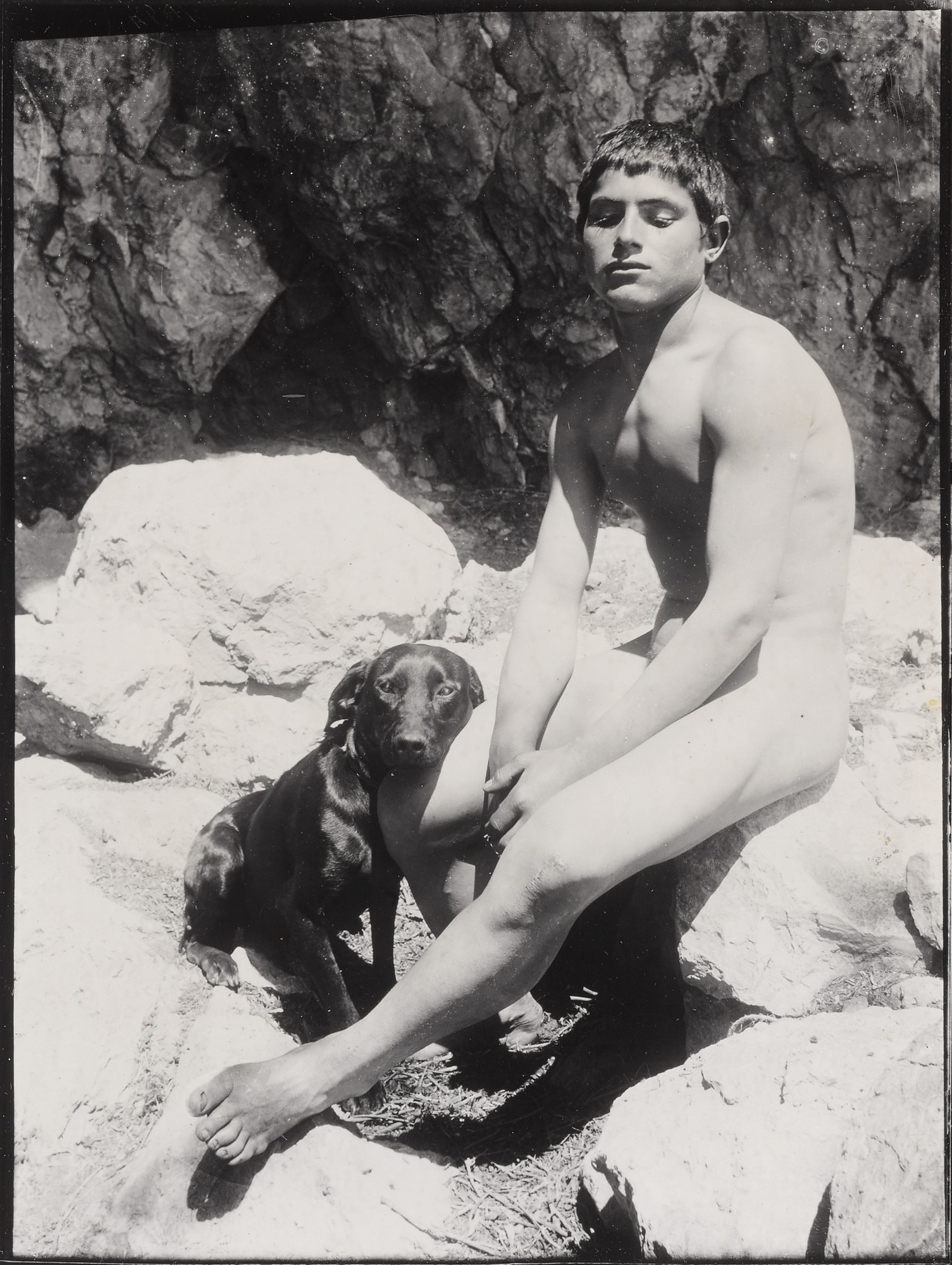
Boy with Gloeden's dog Nedda

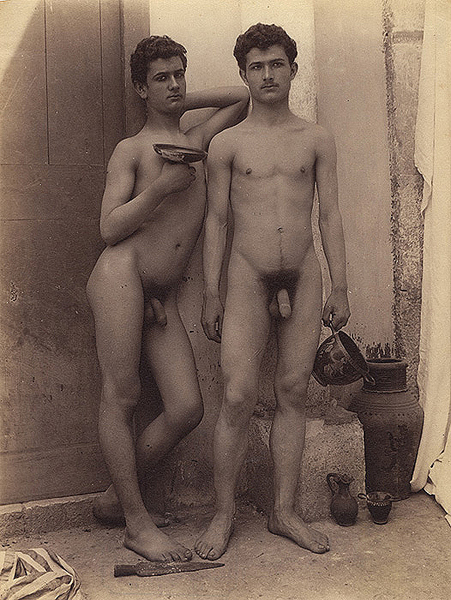
Two Youths Holding Greek Vases

The Three Graces

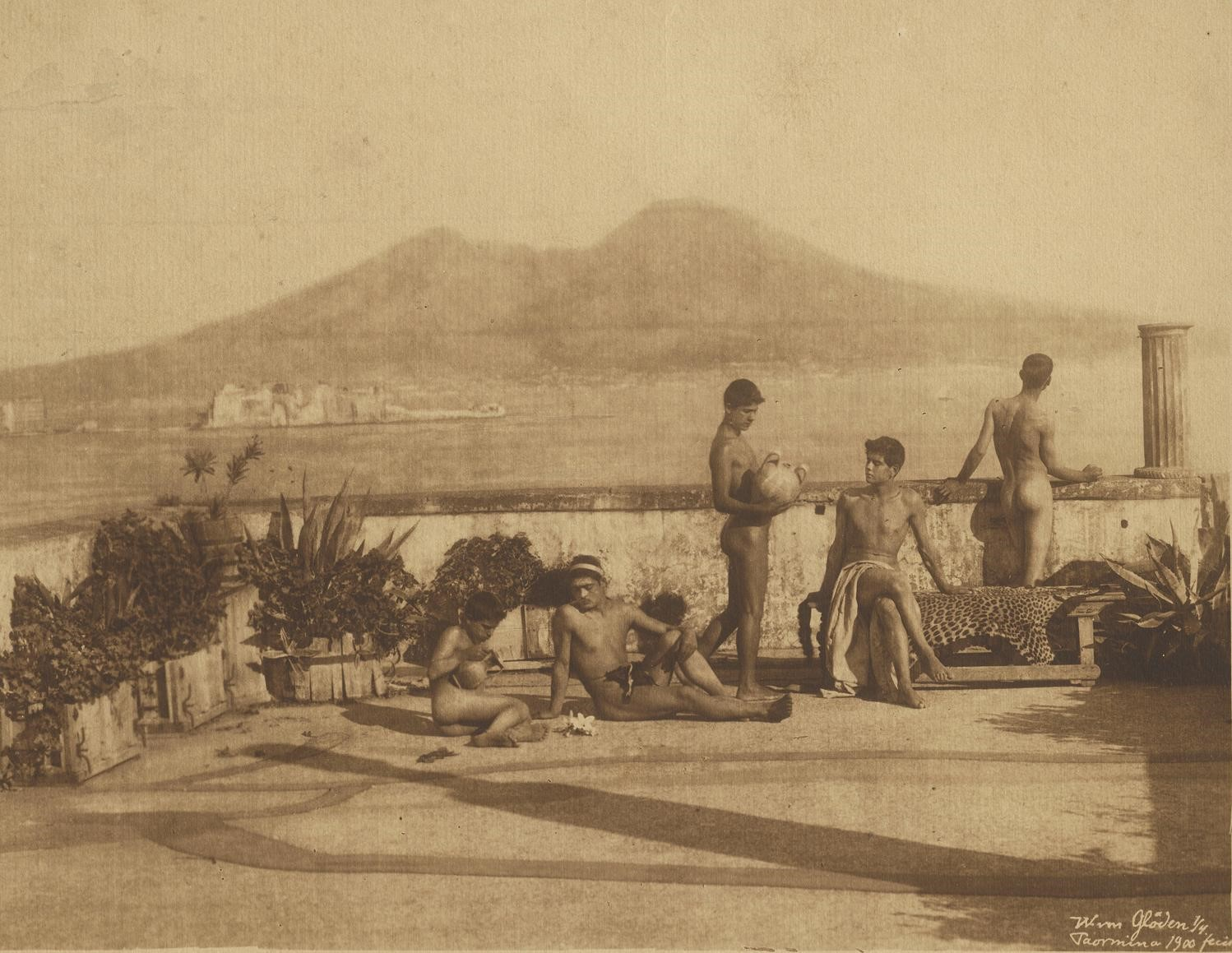
Land of Fire

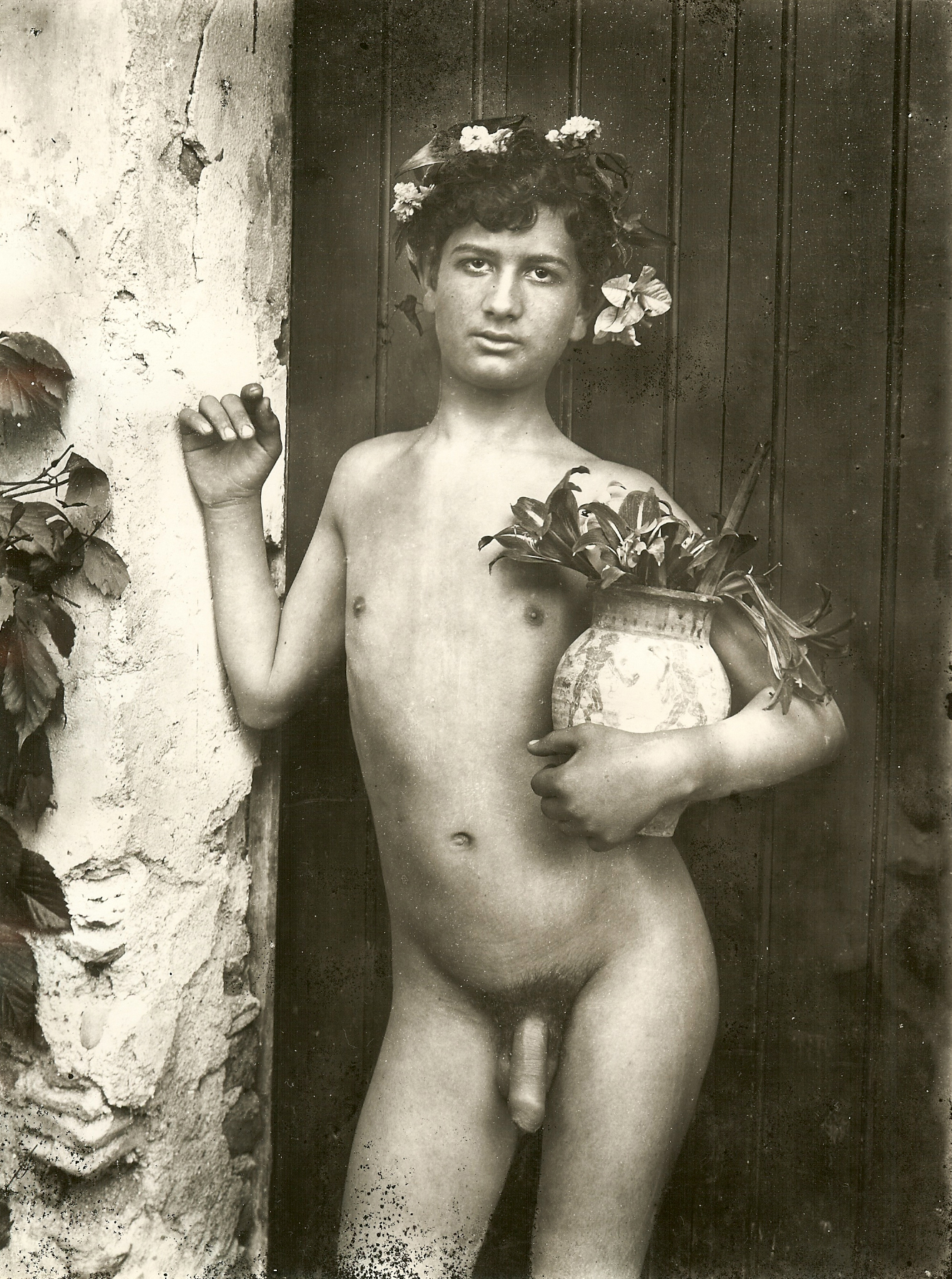
A Naked Boy Wearing a Flower Crown and Carrying an Amphora

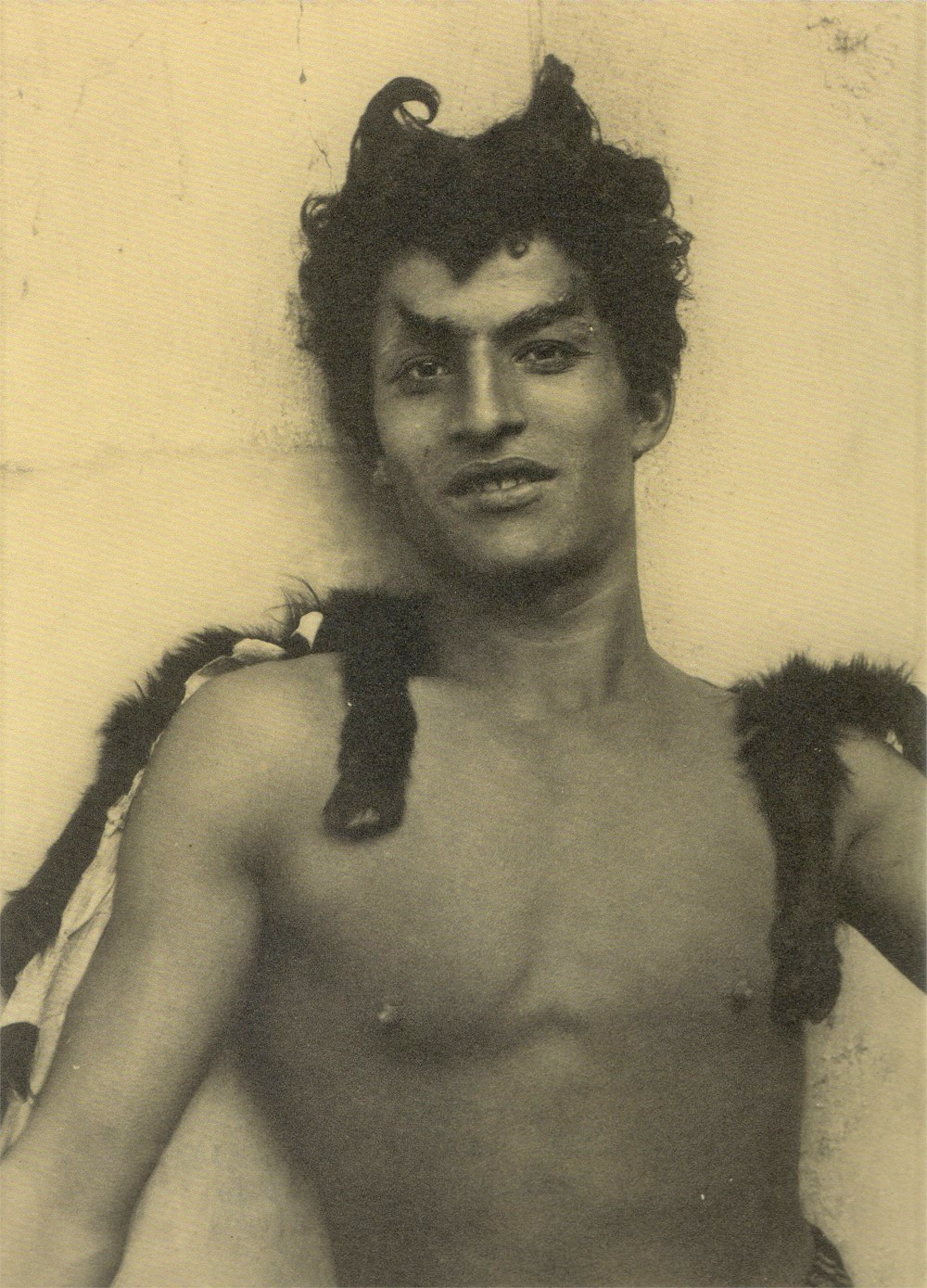
Faun

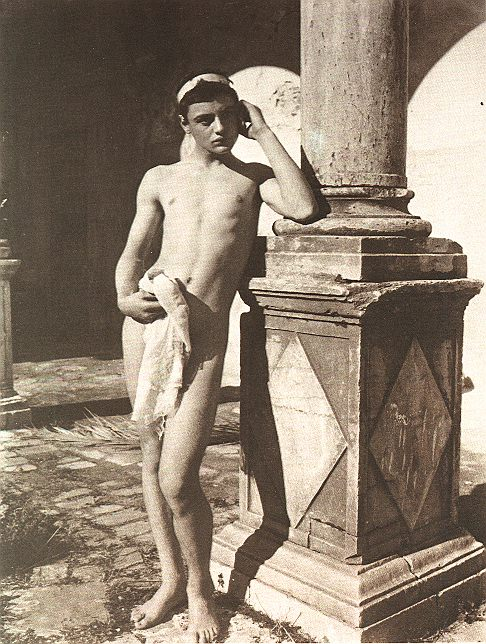
Untitled

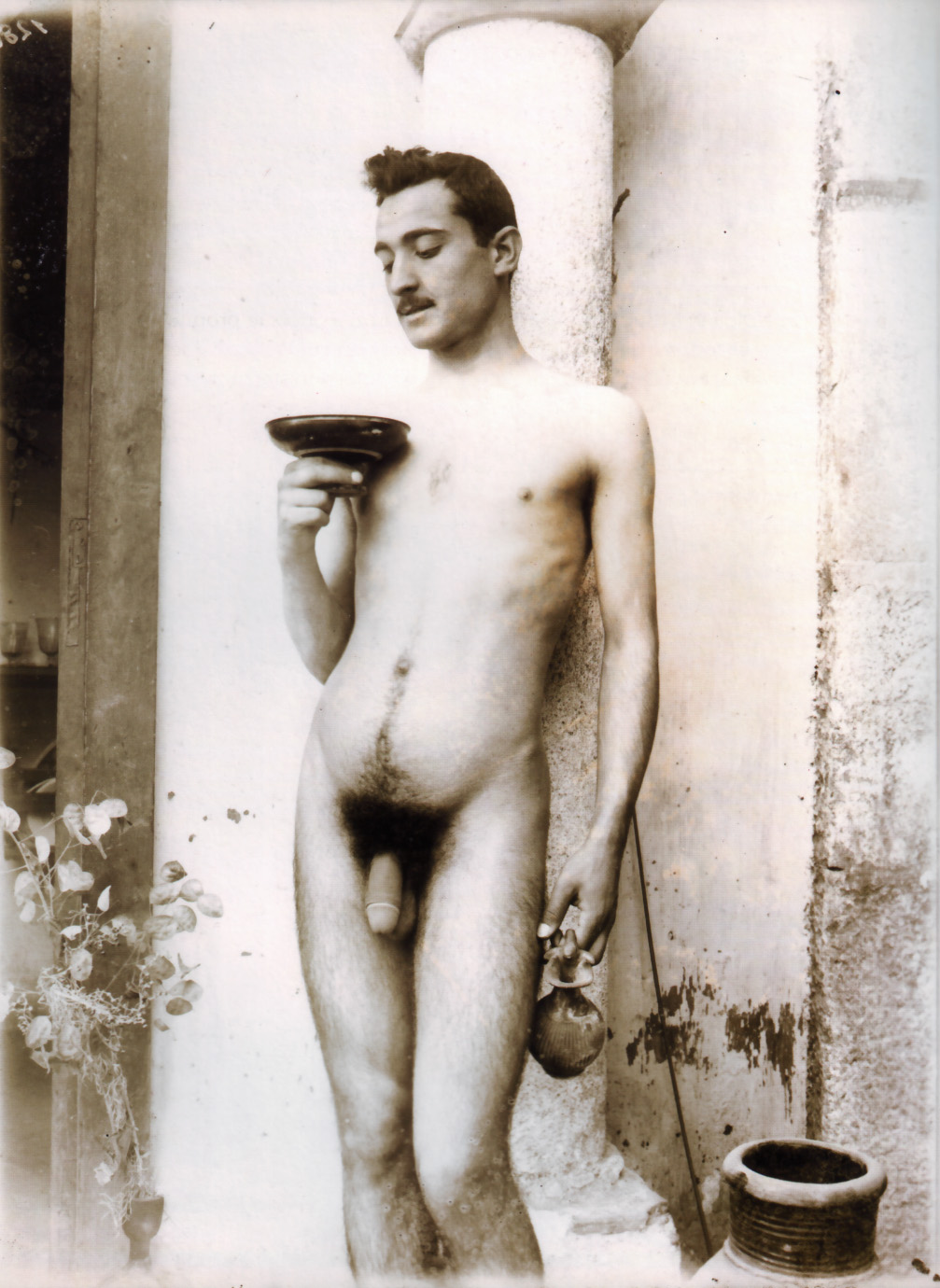
Male Nude

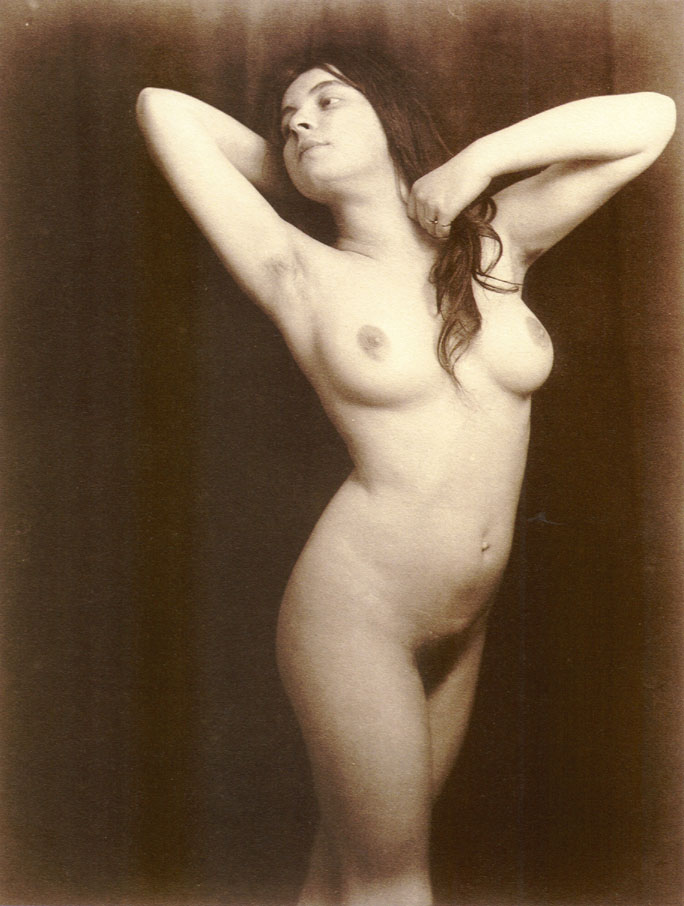
Female Nude

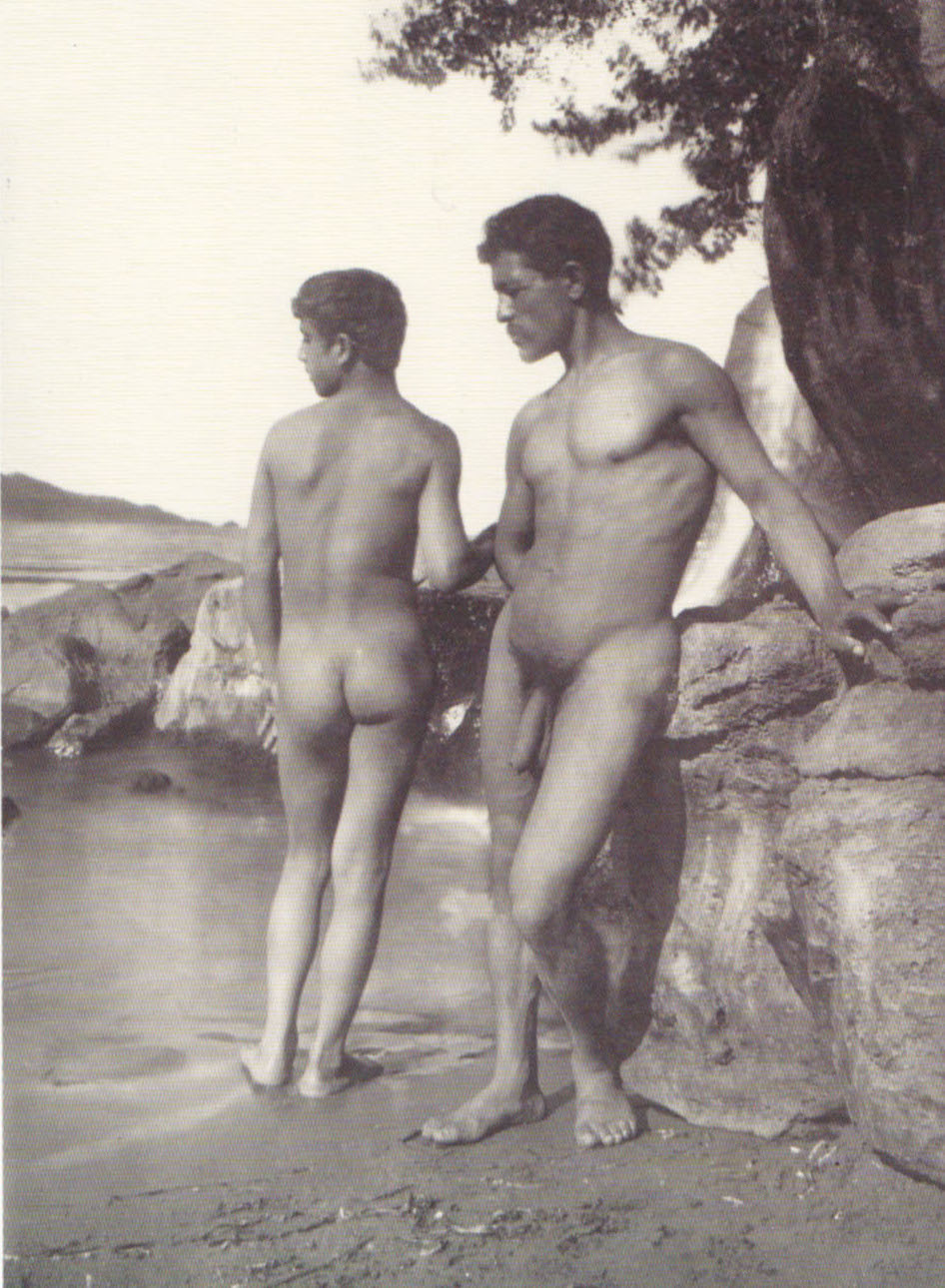
Pasquale Casillo e Nunziato "Paglia Lunga", standing naked along a shore

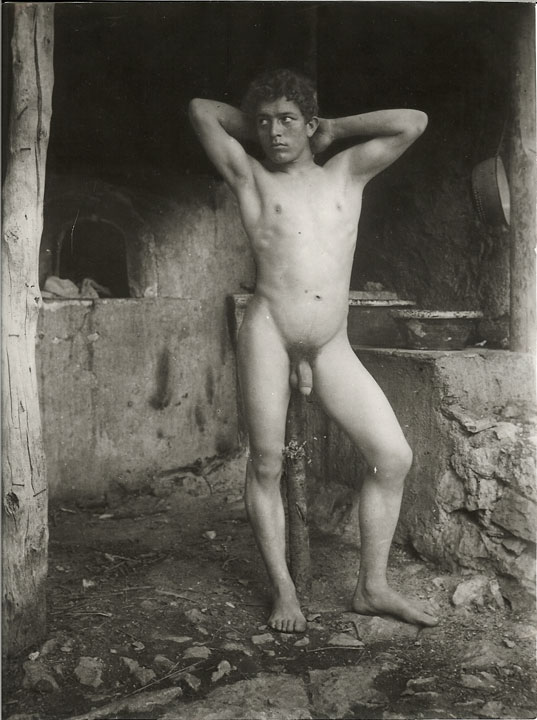
Lad with raised arms under the canopy of a rural house

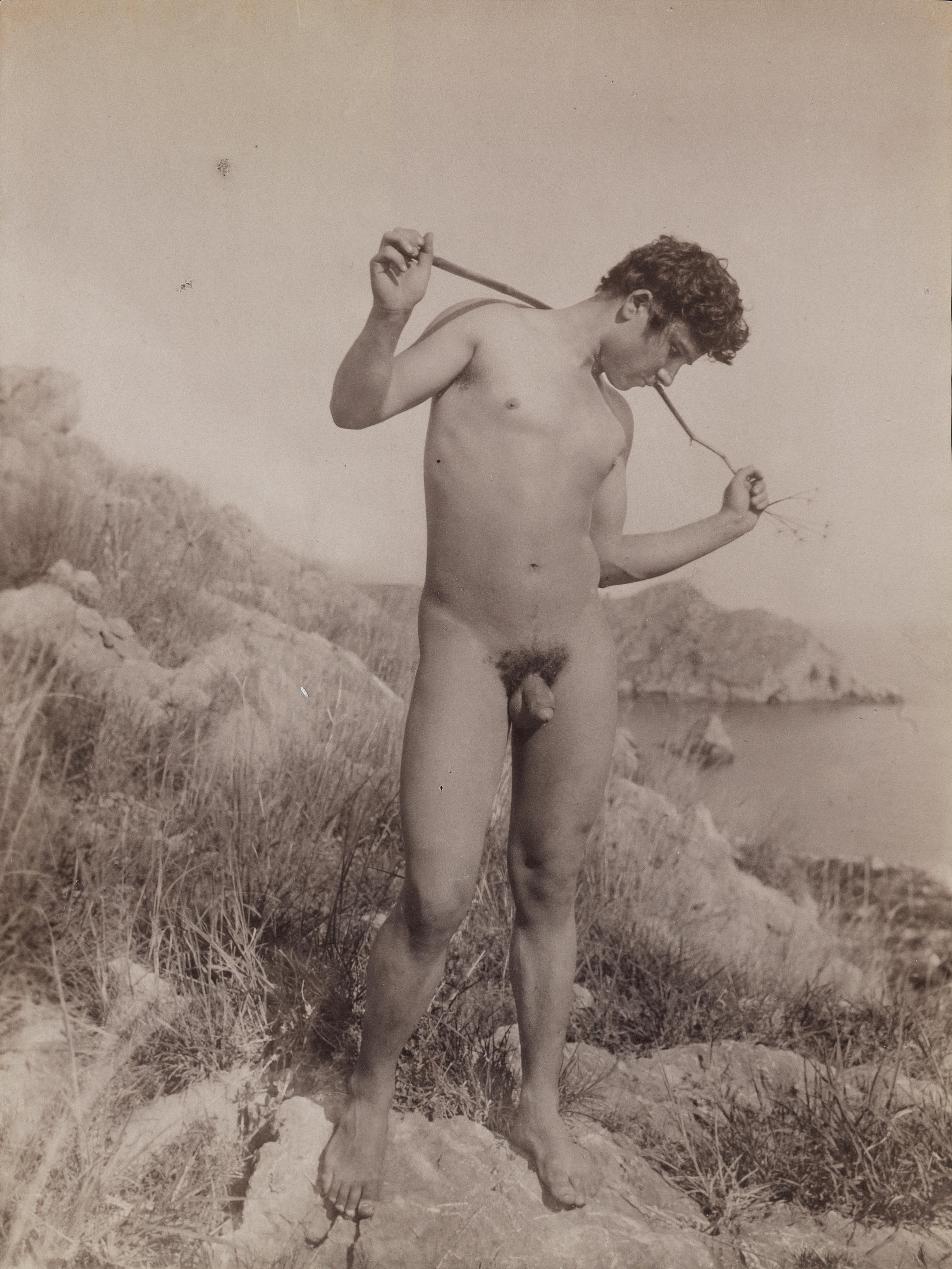
Pietro along the coastline

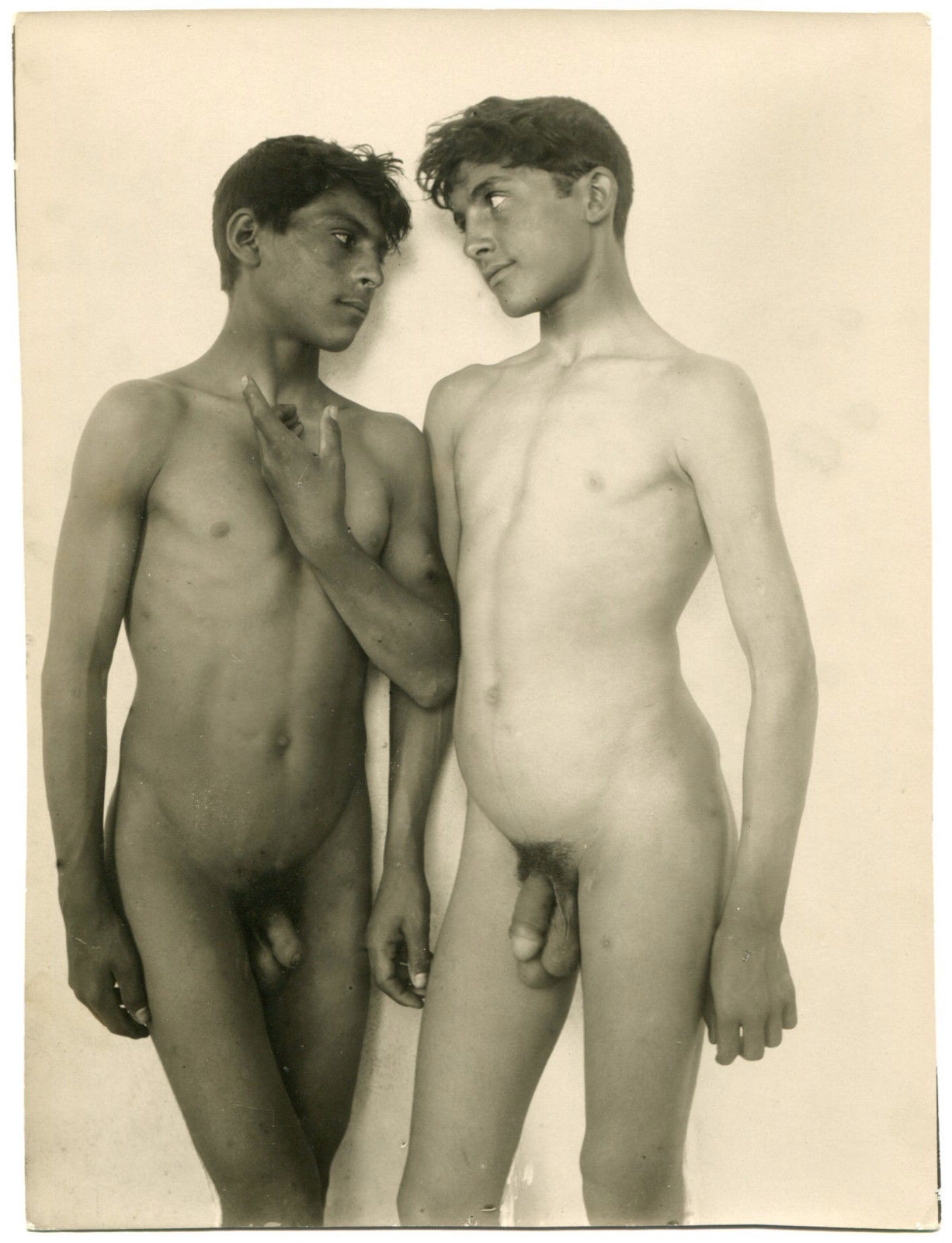
Giacomo and a dark-skinned boy, side by side, look at each other's eyes

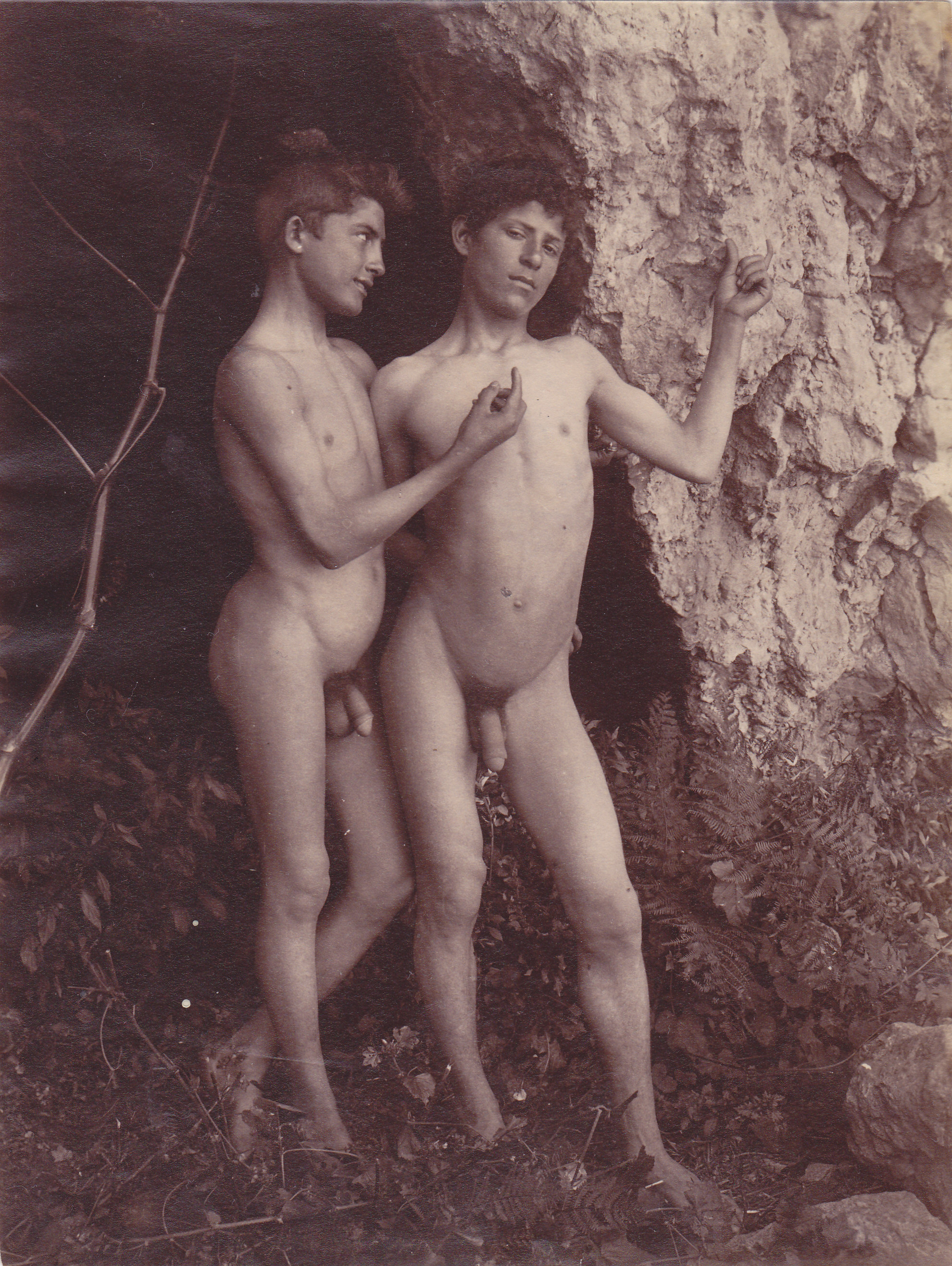
Two lads by a cave

Dancing boys

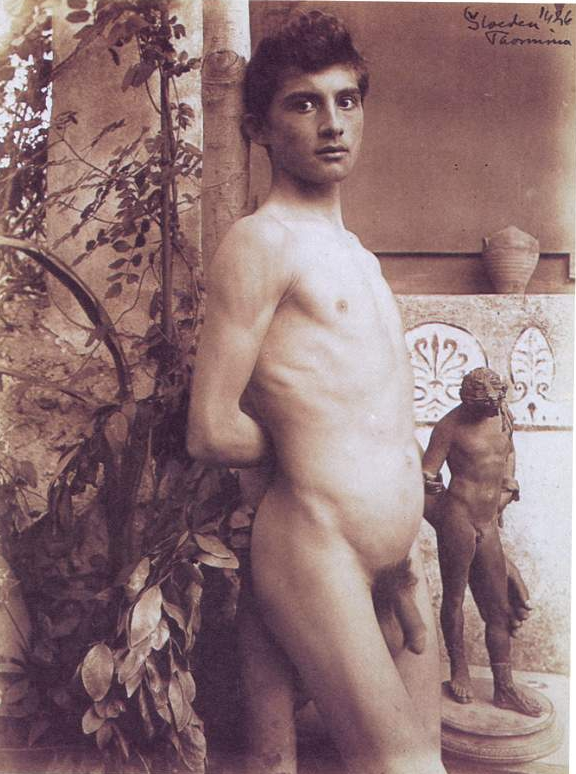
Giacomo Lanfranchi near a replica of a bronze statue from Pompeii.

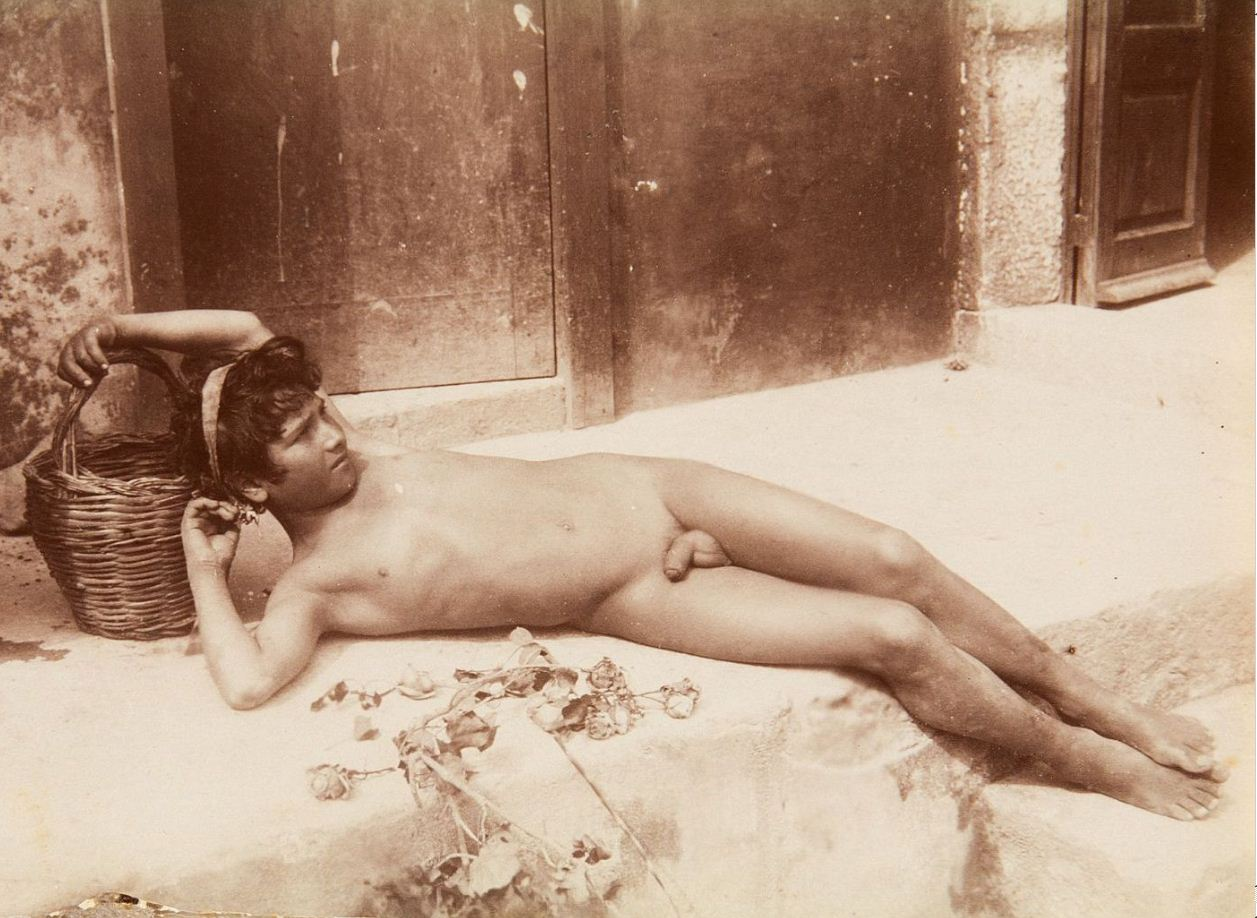
Pietro laying nude on the ground, by a basket.

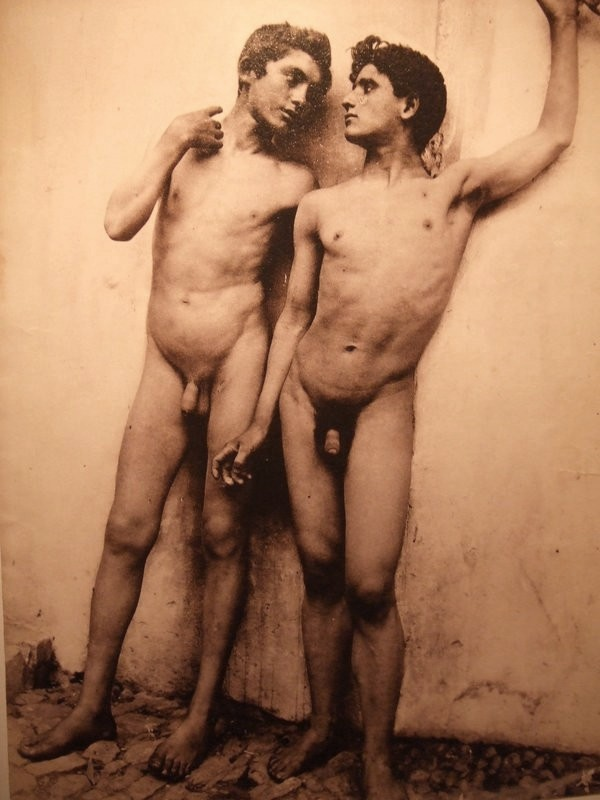
Two nude youths

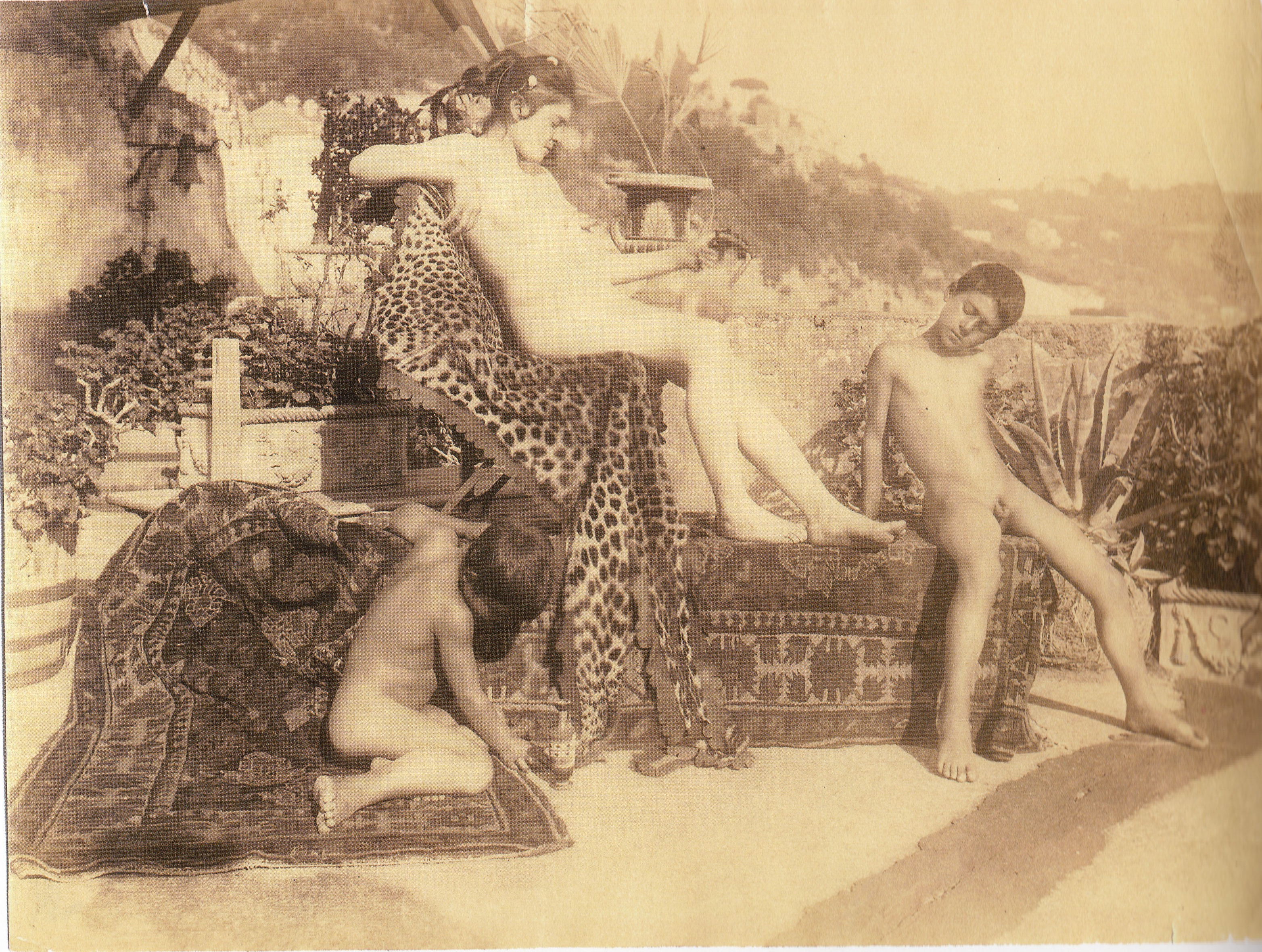
A nude woman and two nude boys on the terrace of Villa Barbaja, Naples.

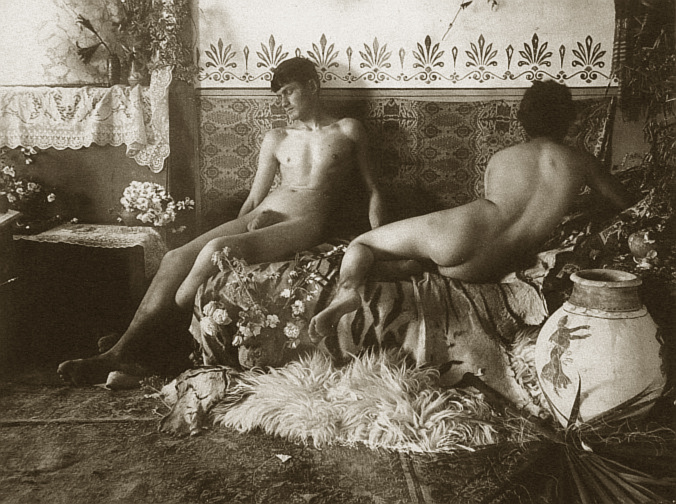
Interior in Naples with two nude males posing

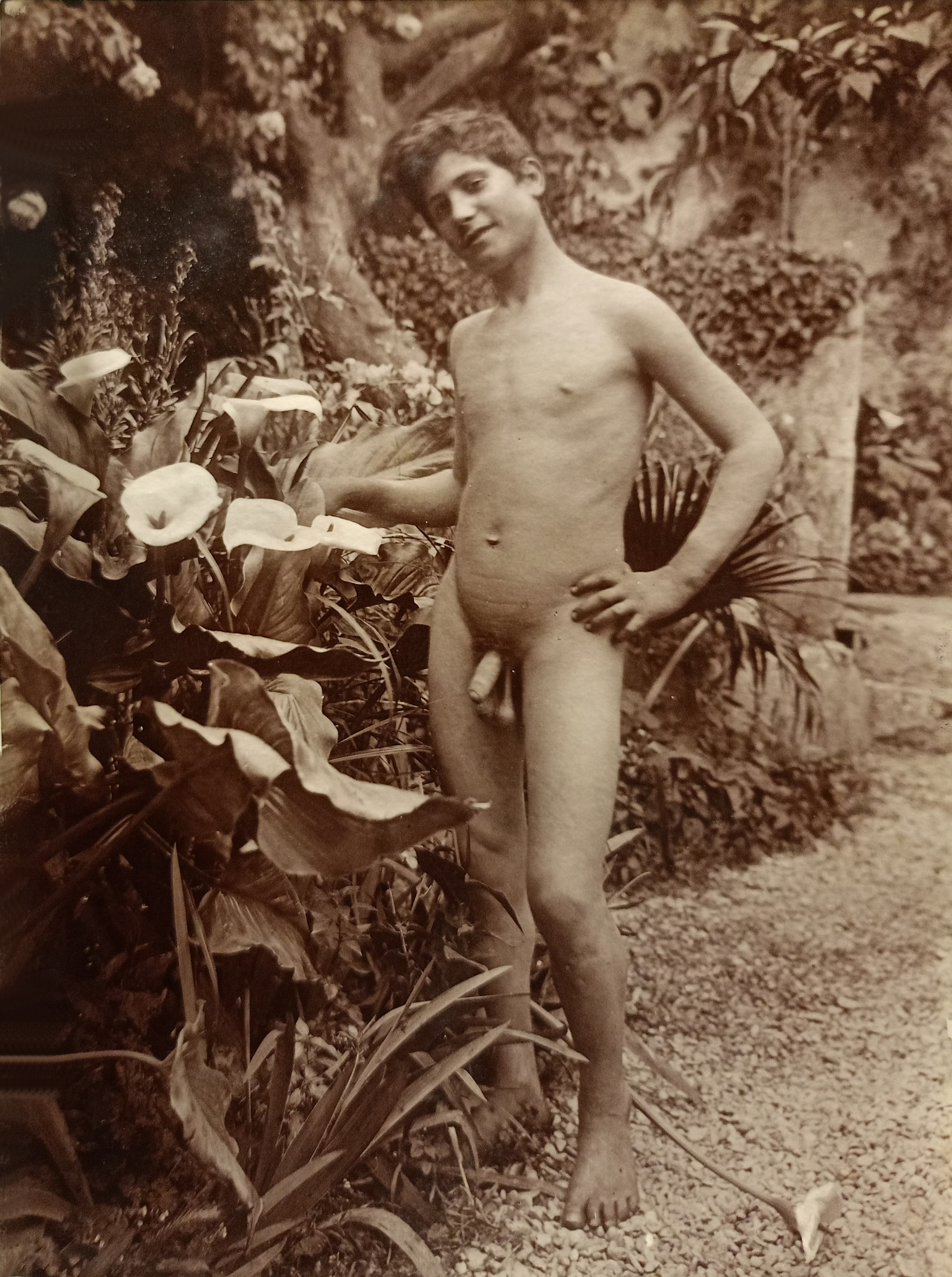
A boy in Gloeden's garden, next to calla flowers

== Major exhibitions ==
- Royal Photographic Society, London: 1893 (21 pictures shown); 1895 (3); 1907 (10); 1908 (3)
- British Journal of Photography Exhibition, London, January 1909 (60 Gloeden prints, half of them studies of youths & maidens)
- Internationale Ausstellung zur Amateurphotographie, Berlin (1899)
- Baron Wilhelm von Gloeden, Kunsthalle Basel (1979)
- Wilhelm von Gloeden – Auch ich in Arkadien, MEWO Kunsthalle Memmingen (2008): 400 photos on exhibit, 800 in the catalog

== See also ==
- Vincenzo Galdi
- Guglielmo Plüschow
