= Raab =

Raab may refer to:

- Raab (surname), includes a list of people with the name
- Raab, Austria, a market town in the district of Schärding in Upper Austria
- Raab (river), a river in Austria and Hungary, also known as Rába
- Raab, Hungary, the German name for the city of Győr, where the Raab/Rába flows into the Danube
  - 1809 Battle of Raab, fought near Raab/Győr during the Napoleonic Wars
  - 1849 Battle of Raab, fought near Raab/Győr during the Hungarian Revolution
- Broccoli raab or rapini, an edible vegetable used in Chinese and Italian cuisine
- Raab-Katzenstein, German aircraft manufacturer
- 3184 Raab, an asteroid

== See also ==
- Raabe
- Rab (disambiguation)
