= Wilhelm Joachim von Hammerstein =

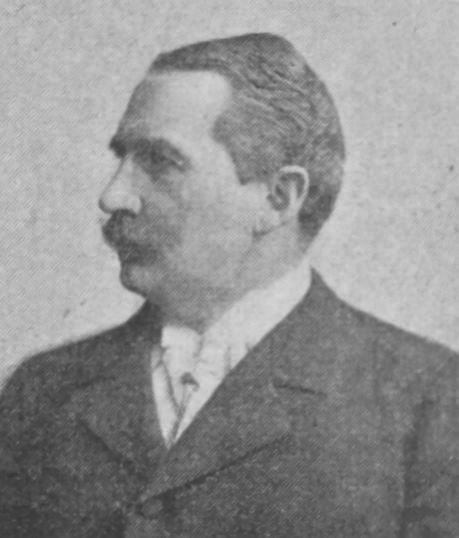
Wilhelm Joachim von Hammerstein

Wilhelm Joachim, Freiherr von Hammerstein-Gesmold (21 February 1838 in Retzow (Müritz) – 16 March 1904 in Charlottenburg) was a Prussian politician of the German Conservative Party and editor-in-chief of the Kreuzzeitung.

== Life ==
Wilhelm Joachim von Hammerstein, member of an old, noble Hammerstein family from Gesmold, finished high school in Lüneburg in 1856 and studied forest sciences in Tharandt and Eberswalde. In 1860 he entered the forestry service of Mecklenburg-Schwerin under the forester Carl Hermann von Gloeden, who, next to his brother-in-law Friedrich Bernhard Maassen, significantly influenced his political views. Two years later he was appointed "Forstjunker" and after the death of his father in 1863 he managed the inherited estate in Schwartow / Pomerania.

The constituency administrative district Köslin 1 (Stolp - Lauenburg - Bütow) sent him to the Prussian House of Representatives in 1876, where he became a member of the German Conservative Party and soon belonged to the leaders of the extreme right. He was a member of the House of Representatives until his resignation in 1895. In 1881 he was elected to the German Reichstag and in 1884 took over the chief editor of the Kreuzzeitung.

With the acceleration of industrialization in the empire, the wealth of the aristocracy gained from agricultural property and production increasingly lagged behind the rapidly growing capital assets. As a clerical conservative, Hammerstein therefore advocated socio-political measures to influence “the masses” and to use them as a means of pressure against “upper-class liberal pursuit of profit”. From 1884 to 1887 he worked closely with Eduard von Ungern-Sternberg at the newspaper .

Hammerstein advocated the revision of the May laws in the Prussian Kulturkampf. He welcomed the fact that as a result of the Waldersee Assembly on 28 November 1887, at which Kaiser Wilhelm II called for “action against the neglect of the masses” in order to “counter the impending danger from social democracy and anarchism ”, the Evangelical Church aid association was founded. Its Evangelical Church Building Association built around 70 Protestant churches over the next 40 years, including the Kaiser Wilhelm Memorial Church in Berlin and the Church of the Ascension (Jerusalem).

The attitude of the Kreuzzeitung under Hammerstein, which turned more to the German Center Party than to the cartel parties (German Conservative Party, German Reich Party, National Liberal Party), and thus also its own, was received ambiguously among the conservatives. For tactical reasons, the cartel parties voted their constituency candidates for the elections on 21 February 1887, and thus gained an impressive 220 seats. Hammerstein therefore attacked the Bismarck government in 1889 who, in his opinion, called the monarchy into question through a cartel-friendly policy. For this reason, Hammerstein left the party leadership. When the emperor also presented himself as non-partisan in a decree in the Reichsanzeiger and thus disavowed the hyper-loyal Kreuzzeitung, Hammerstein was no longer re-elected in 1890. In a replacement election for the constituency of Herford-Halle, however, he moved back into the Reichstag in 1892 and maintained the mandate in the new election in 1893. On 11 November 1895 Hammerstein resigned from his seat.

== Hammerstein affair ==
On 4 July 1895 the Kreuzzeitung's committee suspended its editor-in-chief Hammerstein for dishonesty. He had been bribed by a paper supplier Flinsch and had given him inflated bills. He forged the signatures of Counts of Kanitz and Finck von Finckenstein. He therefore resigned his mandates in the Reich and Landtag in the summer of 1895. When the Ministry of Justice started investigations, Hammerstein fled with his family and 200,000 marks via Tyrol and Naples to Greece, where he arrived on 7 October. After protests by the DFP and SPD in the Reichstag, who accused the Minister of Justice of mild persecution - in order to intentionally let Hammerstein escape - the latter sent a detective commissioner Wolff to southern Europe. Wolff found Charlotte von Glöden and her son Wilhelm in Taormina and Hammerstein alias “Dr. Heckert ” on 27 December in Athens. He arranged for his deportation and arrested him on arrival in Brindisi. In April 1896 Hammerstein was sentenced to three years in prison.

== Personal life ==
In 1864 he married Charlotte von Glöden, née Maaßen (1824–1904), the widow of his mentor, Hermann von Glöden (1820-1862), and thus became the stepfather of the photographer Wilhem von Glöden.

== Literature ==
- Hans Leuss: Wilhelm Freiherr von Hammerstein. Walther Verlagsbuchhandlung, Berlin 1905
- Wolfgang Hofmann (1966). "Hammerstein-Gesmold, Wilhelm Freiherr von". Neue Deutsche Biographie (in German). Vol. 7. Berlin: Duncker & Humblot. pp. 597–597. (full text online).
- Grewolls, Grete (2011). Wer war wer in Mecklenburg und Vorpommern. Das Personenlexikon (in German). Rostock: Hinstorff Verlag. p. 3817. ISBN 978-3-356-01301-6.
