= Pancrazio Buciunì =

Italian model

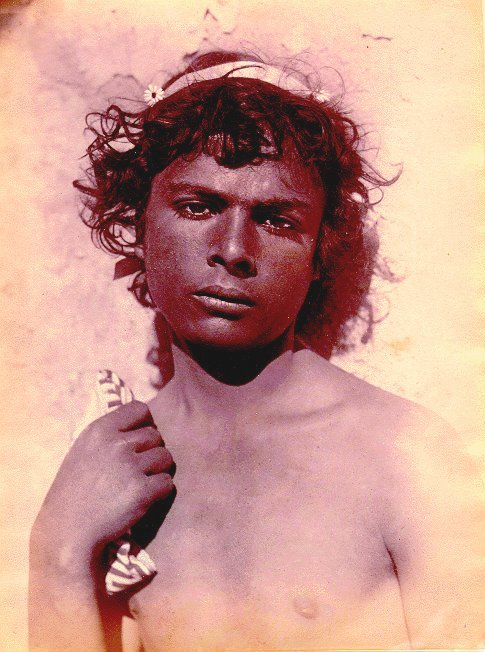
- Young Pancrazio Buciunì
- Born: 12 June 1879
- Died: 30 January 1963 (aged 83)

Pancrazio Buciunì (28 June 1879 – 30 January 1963) was an Italian model, lover and heir of Wilhelm von Gloeden, a German photographer who settled in Sicily in the late nineteenth century and was significant in the History of Taormina.

== Early life ==
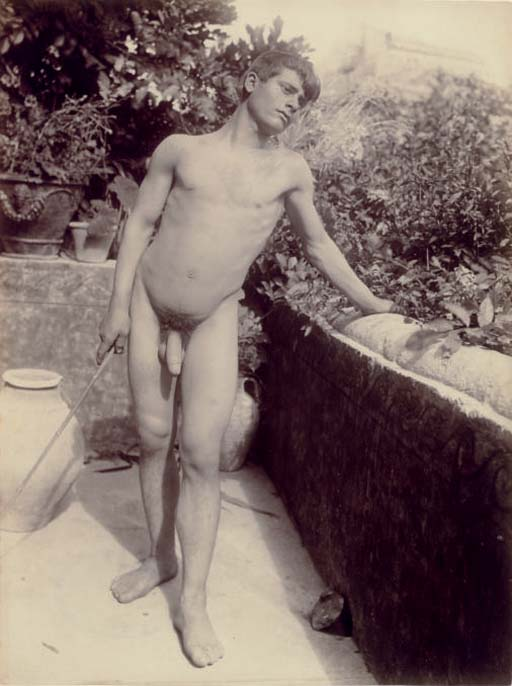
Auction site Christie's declared it to be a portrait of Pancrazio Buciunì

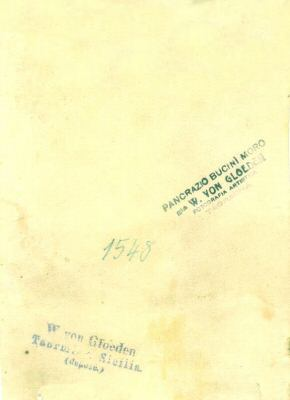
Reverse stamp of one of von Gloeden's works, bearing a stamp of Pancrazio Buciunì

When Wilhelm von Gloeden arrived in the hilltop city of Taormina overlooking the Ionian Sea, he engaged the services of a local boy, Pancrazio Buciunì, named after Pancras of Taormina. The fourteen-year-old was already extremely handsome, with dark skin and large eyes. Von Gloeden nicknamed him "Il Moro" (The Moor) because of his dark complexion. Il Moro first became one of von Gloeden's models, then assistant, pupil and eventually lover.

The couple were in love. The young Buciunì looked after von Gloeden when he was sick, administering medications, getting special food from townspeople, preparing the saltwater baths that doctors prescribed. He also arranged for local youths to participate in the midnight parties von Gloeden threw for his guests.

== First World War ==
When Italy entered the First World War, Gloeden had to leave the country. He left his home and studio in the care of Buciunì until his return in 1919. Buciunì was conscripted into the Royal Italian Army when the war began. Since he was in his thirties, he was not sent to the front, but was posted to a coastal artillery unit near Taormina. Thus, he was able to look after the villa and maintain the studio.

Buciunì and von Gloeden were able to communicate with the help of a Swiss friend. Since Italy and Germany were at war, letters could not be sent directly. Wilhelm mailed them to neutral Switzerland. The letters were then forwarded to Pancrazio. This mail exchange continued for almost the entire war.

There was no political or military information in the letters, but when some were opened in a routine check, Italian authorities suspected something. Buciunì wrote to von Gloeden about the house and the animals, with details about the conduct of "the crow" and "the dove". He also wrote about models, referring to them by first names. Some suspected this was part of an espionage network. As a result, Buciunì was arrested on charges of treason. He was imprisoned for three months at a military prison and faced court-martial as a spy with capital punishment if convicted. Despite interrogations, during which he was threatened with shooting, if he did not tell who were the persons with "cover" names, he convinced the military he was loyal. Buciunì was sent back to serve with his artillery unit and was also allowed to resume correspondence with von Gloeden.

== After First World War ==
Von Gloeden returned to Taormina in 1919, as soon as the war ended. He continued to photograph till 1930 with Pancrazio Buciunì always by his side. When von Gloeden died in 1931, Buciunì was named as his heir. He received all his personal belongings and about 3,000 photographic glass plates. Buciunì was married and had children.

== During the Mussolini regime ==
At the end of the 1920s, when the Vatican formed an alliance with the fascist government, some 1,000 glass negatives and about 2,000 prints from von Gloeden's legacy were confiscated and destroyed by police as obscene. The so-called vice campaign started in 1936. The police raided Il Moro's home. Over 1,000 of the master glass negatives were destroyed, while he wept. He was accused of keeping pornography and arrested. Buciunì was charged and put on trial. The same as with his treason case he was able to defend himself and von Gloeden's memory, telling the court that it was not competent to judge works of art. He listed collectors who kept those photographs, including Italian museums and critics, as well as the Ministry of Education itself. The court acquitted him, but this could not save the destroyed works. Il Moro distributed the remaining plates among local families, priests and institutions.

During the events of WWII Pancrazio had lost his daughter Natala, who disappeared in 1943 in Catania during an Allied bombing, and had seen his son Alfio deported to Germany as a prisoner of war.

== After World War II ==
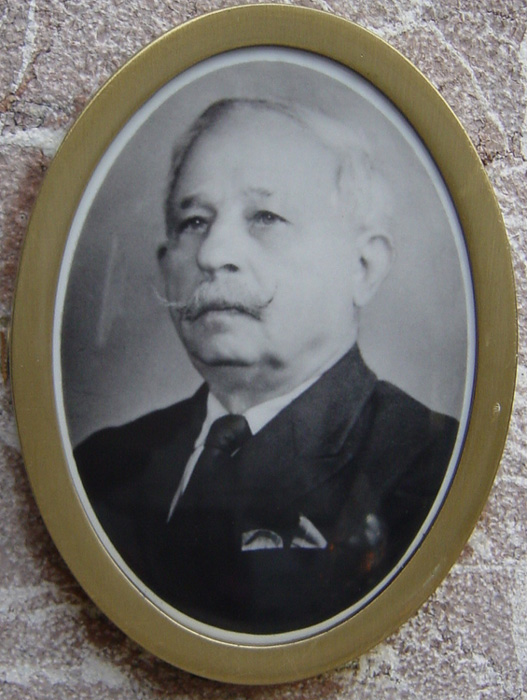
Photo from tomb of Pancrazio Buciunì in Taormina

When Buciunì reassembled his collection after World War II ended, he found that only one third of the works was saved. Others were destroyed or disappeared. Little is known about Il Moro's life after his trials and World War II. The immediate post-war period was a period of severe economic hardship, if not outright hunger, for the entire town of Taormina. The tourist industry was practically eliminated, thus reducing the amount of potential clients of Buciunì to almost zero. As for mail-order sales, the exhausted nations of the conflict had all imposed severe restrictions on capital exports, so the foreign market was practically closed at the time. When Roger Peyrefitte visited Taormina in the 1940s, he mentioned Pancrazio Buciunì in his novel, telling that: "His faithful Moro, today a simple fisherman, working at what many of his countrymen do (fishing)". It is reasonable to doubt that at almost seventy Buciunì could compete in the profession of fisherman with the many unemployed young men: a different tradition in fact says that he simply "made the season" as a waiter on a cruise ship. However, it is confirmed by his descendants that he also survived by manufacturing fishing nets, apparently with good success because the rumor had spread that his nets "brought good luck" to the fishermen.

Unexpectedly, the publication in 1949 of Roger Peyrefitte's short novel, Eccentric amori, which had considerable success all over the world, relaunched the name of Wilhelm von Gloeden among a new generation of homophiles, who began to contact il Moro to buy pictures of the baron.

Pancrazio provided for this demand, drastically reduced compared to the past, until his death, relying first on the photographer Gaetano D'Agata for the printing and, after D'Agata's death in 1949, on the Giovanni Malambrì. On the other hand, the shop of another former Gloeden model, Francesco Raya (1904-1974), in Corso Umberto, handled the sale in Taormina.

== Death and von Gloeden archive ==
Pancrazio Buciunì died in 1963. His descendants still live in Taormina and keep part of his collection. Some 800 remnants of von Gloeden's work, that belonged to Il Moro, including 878 glass negatives, 956 positives and 200 albumen prints, were sold to the archive of Lucio Amelio in Naples by his son Vincenzo Buciunì(1912-1997).

After Amelio's death, the ex-Buciunì estate was purchased in 1999-2000 by the Fratelli Alinari museum in Florence. In 2021, the financial problems of the Alinari Foundation finally led the Tuscany Region to purchase the Gloeden archive, to preserve it and make it accessible to the public again in the future.

A part of the Gloeden collection was in the possession of Francesco Raya (1904-1974) and then of Nino Malambrì for a long time in Taormina. A part of this collection, which includes a hundred positives, the 18x24 camera and Gloeden's private photos, was purchased by the Municipality of Taormina in 2023, thanks to the sponsorship of an unnamed fashion house. The Municipality of Taormina is planning to assign them to the city museum that it intends to build.
