= Rabe (surname) =

Rabe is a German surname meaning "raven" and may refer to:

- David Rabe (born 1940), American playwright and screenwriter
- Eckard Rabe (born 1948), South African actor
- Eugene Rabe (1911–1974), German-American astronomer
- Folke Rabe (1935–2017), Swedish composer
- Florence Bates (born Rabe, 1888–1954) American actress
- Jean Rabe (born 1957), fantasy and science fiction author and editor
- John Rabe (1882–1950), German diplomat and businessman
- Josh Rabe (born 1978), baseball player
- Jutta Rabe (born 1955), German journalist
- Karin Rabe, Swedish orienteering competitor
- Karin M. Rabe, American physicist
- Karl Rabe (1895–1968), automobile designer
- Laurentius Corvinus (Laurentius Rabe in German) (1465–1527), Silesian scholar and poet
- Lily Rabe (born 1982), American actress
- Margarete Rabe (born 1923), German World War II concentration camp guard
- Pamela Rabe (born 1959), Canadian/Australian actor and theatre director
- Peter Rabe (1921–1990), German-American writer, mostly crime fiction
- Sascha Rabe (born 1985), German ice dancer
- Stephen G. Rabe, American historian
- Thomas Rabe (born 1951), German professor of gynaecology and obstetrics
- Ties Rabe (born 1960), German politician
- Wilhelm F. Rabe (1893–1958), German astronomer

== See also ==
- Raabe
