= Rabe (crater) =

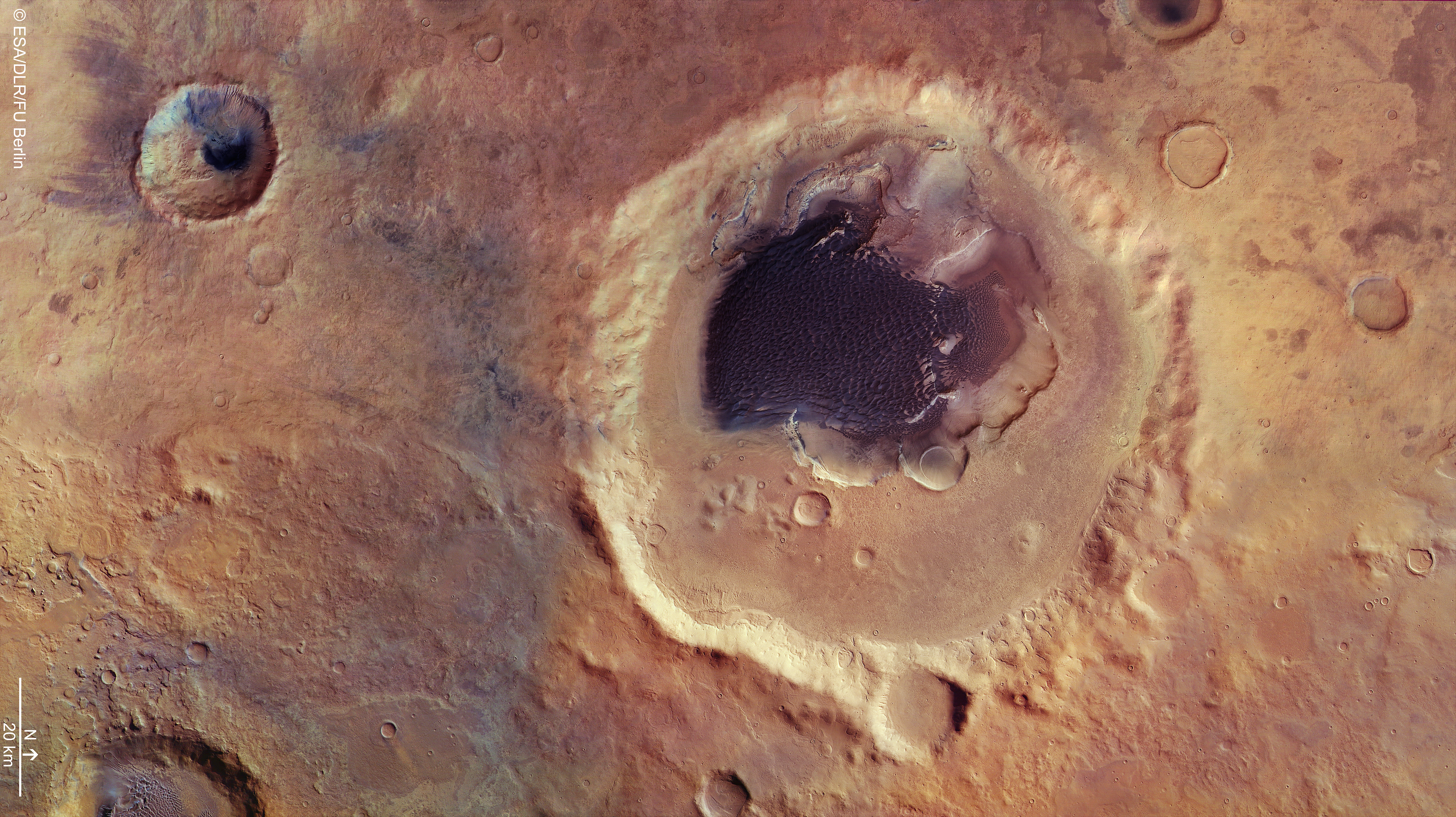
- ESA's Mars Express' HRSC photo of Rabe Crater, North is to the right
- Planet: Mars
- Region: Noachis quadrangle
- Coordinates: 43.9°S 34.9°E
- Quadrangle: Noachis
- Diameter: 108 km (67 mi)
- Eponym: Wilhelm F. Rabe

Rabe is a crater on the planet Mars, located in the Noachis quadrangle at 43.9° south latitude 34.9° east longitude. It measures approximately 108 kilometers in diameter. Its name was approved in 1973, and refers to Wilhelm F. Rabe, a German astronomer (1893–1958).

There is a huge field of dunes in the center of Rabe. The dunes may be remnants of crater-filling deposits, or they may be windblown sediment trapped in the crater.

Rabe is west of the Hellespontus Montes and the huge Hellas Planitia.

== Gallery ==
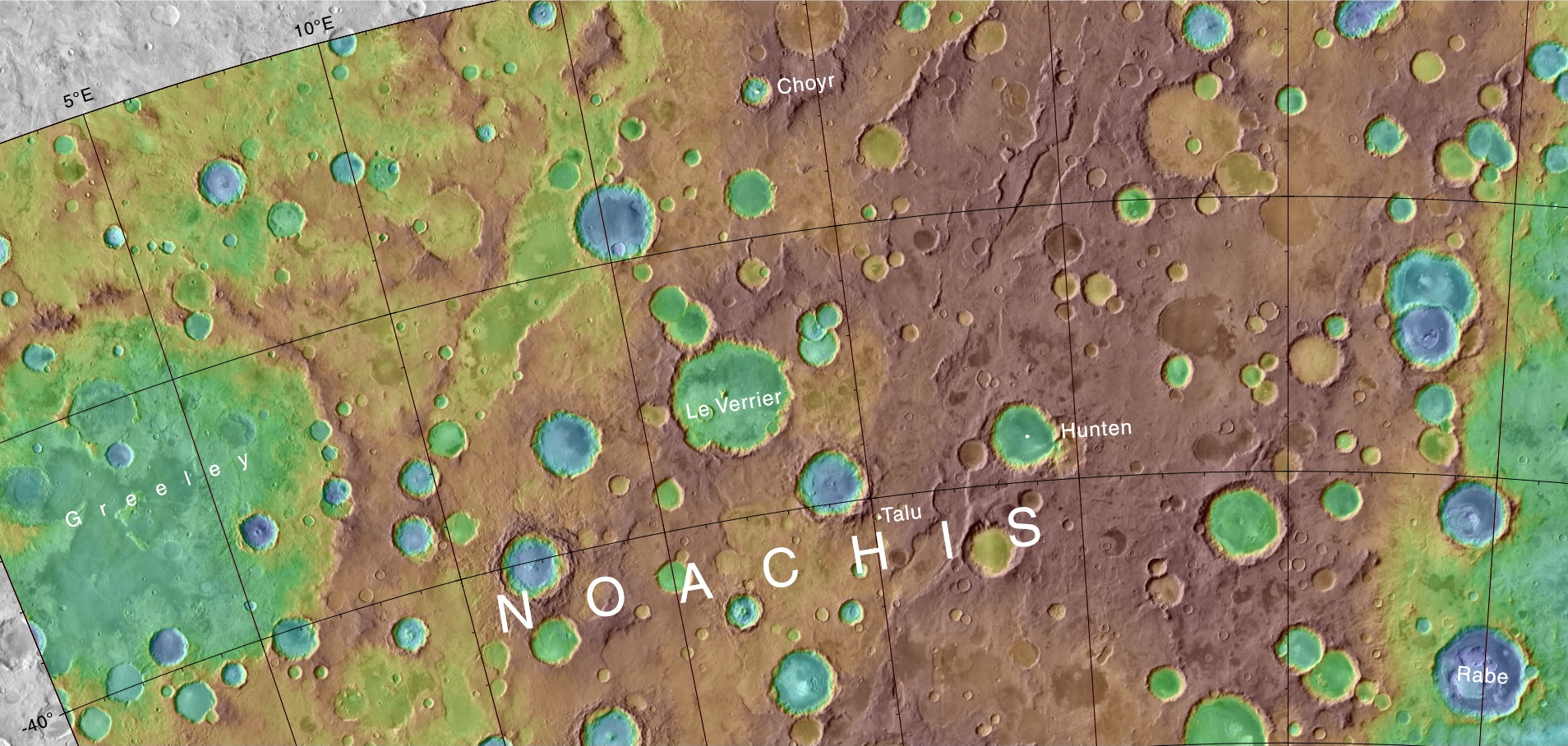
Map showing location of Rabe crater on the bottom right

Rabe crater floor, as seen by HiRISE

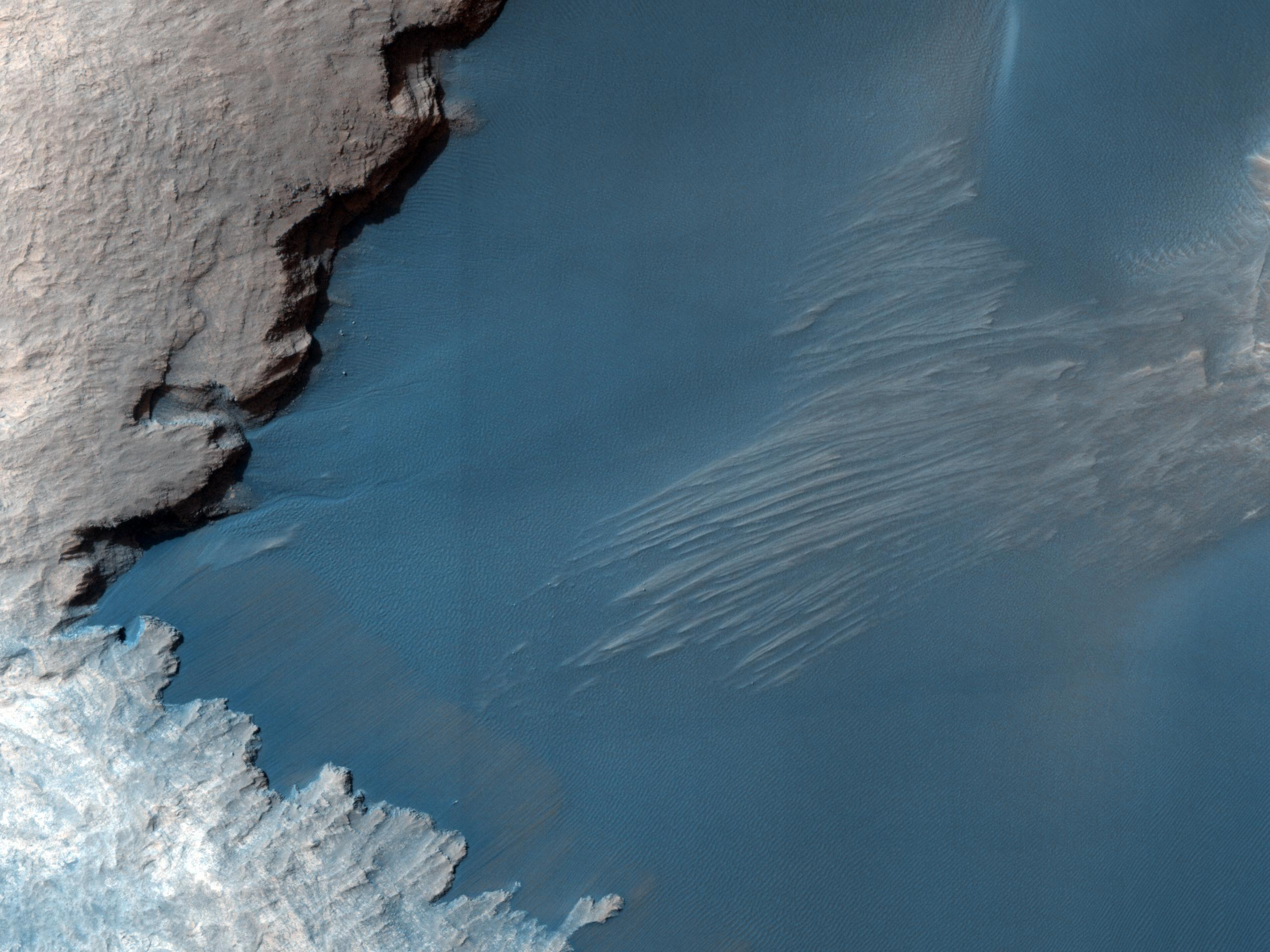
This image shows part of the floor of Rabe crater

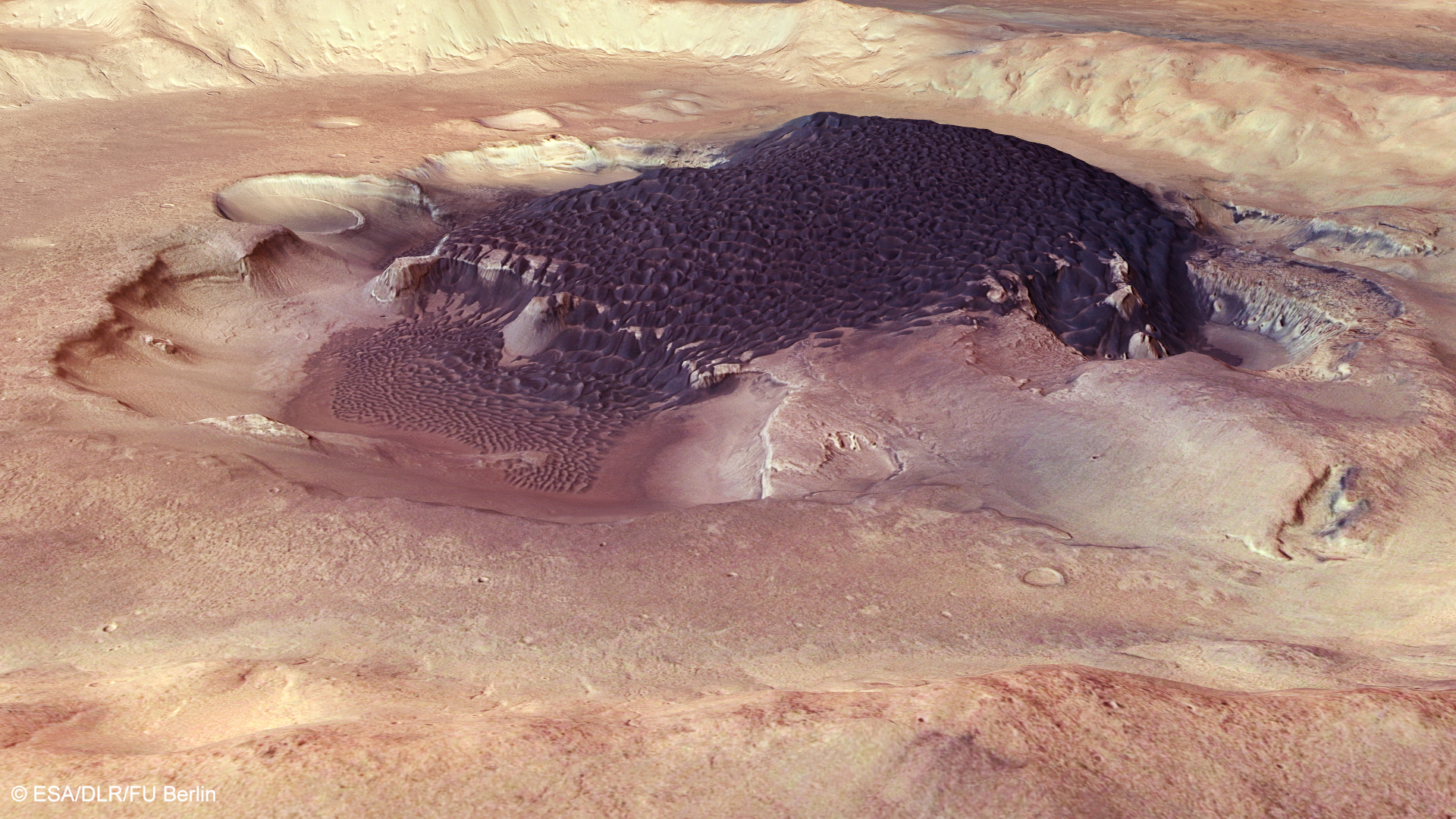
Perspective view of Rabe crater seen from the ESA's Mars Express

== See also ==
- List of craters on Mars: O-Z
