= Raabe =

The last name Raabe specifically originates from Prussia, derived from a Prussian warrior clans' symbol: a raven, which was one of the four beasts of war. During Prussia's decimation, most of these warriors intermarried with the Danish, and slowly made their way to Germany and Austria. The last name "Rabe", however, originates in Germany. Rabe also means raven. Jewish surname of Raabe derived from Hebrew word Rav meaning Rabbi, which is a title given to a Jewish scholar or spiritual leader of a Jewish community. Recent historical bearers of the name "Raabe" may refer to:

- Sigrid Solbakk Raabe (born 1996), Norwegian singer-songwriter
- Brian Raabe (born 1967), American baseball player
- Dierk Raabe (born 1965), German materials scientist
- Ed Raabe, owner of Raabe Racing Enterprises
- Hedwig Raabe (1844–1905), German actress
- Herbert P. Raabe (1909–2004), German theorist, inventor and engineer, see Nyquist–Shannon sampling theorem
- Joseph Ludwig Raabe (1801–1859), Swiss mathematician
- Max Raabe (born 1962), German musician
- Meinhardt Raabe (1915–2010), American actor
- Nancy Raabe (born 1954), American composer
- Peter Raabe (1872–1945), German composer
- Sascha Raabe (born 1968), German politician
- Wilhelm Raabe (1831–1910), German novelist

== See also ==
- Rabe (surname)
- Raab (disambiguation)
