= Wilhelm F. Rabe =

German astronomer

Wilhelm F. Rabe (1893–1958) was a German astronomer. He worked at the Bogenhausen Observatory, being its director from 1935 until 1946.

He was a talented observer, and was one of the first to trace unexplained errors when obtaining vertical positions of stars to the deflection of the telescope tube. He extensively studied binary stars and was recognized for this work.

The Martian crater Rabe was named in his honor.
